= Artistic Gymnastics at the National Games of China =

Multi-sport event in China

The Artistic Gymnastics at the National Games of China is the highest-level comprehensive multi-sport event of China. It is hosted by the General Administration of Sport of China. The games is held every four years, usually in the summer or autumn of the year after the Summer Olympics.

== Men’s medalists ==
=== Team ===
Year	Location	Gold	Silver	Bronze
2001	Guangzhou, Guangdong	Guangdong	Hubei	Jiangsu
2005	Nanjing, Jiangsu	Guangdong	Jiangsu	People's Liberation Army
2009	Shandong	Guangdong	Shandong	Sichuan
2013	Liaoning	Shandong	Guizhou	Guangdong
2017	Tianjin	Guizhou	Jiangsu	Guangdong
2021	Shaanxi	Jiangsu	Hunan	Guangdong
2025	Guangdong, Hong Kong, Macau	Jiangsu	Hunan	Zhejiang

=== All-around ===
Year	Location	Gold	Silver	Bronze
2001	Guangzhou, Guangdong	Yang Wei	Lu Yufu	Huang Xu
2005	Nanjing, Jiangsu	Lu Bo	Yang Wei	Feng Jing
2009	Shandong	Teng Haibin	Feng Zhe	Lu Bo
2013	Liaoning	Zhou Shixiong	Liu Rongbin	Deng Shudi
2017	Tianjin	Lin Chaopan	Deng Shudi	Liu Rongbin
2021	Shaanxi	Xiao Ruoteng	Zhang Boheng	Sun Wei
2025	Guangdong, Hong Kong, Macau	Xiao Ruoteng	Zhang Boheng	Yang Haonan

=== Floor Exercise ===
Year	Location	Gold	Silver	Bronze
2001	Guangzhou, Guangdong	Xing Aowei	Lu Yufu	Yang Wei
2005	Nanjing, Jiangsu	Liang Fuliang	Zou Kai	Du Min
2009	Shandong	Zou Kai	Huang Yuguo	Liang Fuliang
2013	Liaoning	Wu Di	Cheng Ran	Zhou Shixiong
2017	Tianjin	Mu Jile	Sun Bing	Lin Chaopan
2021	Shaanxi	Su Weide	Deng Shudi	Zhang Boheng
2025	Guangdong, Hong Kong, Macau	Chen Zhilong	Yang Jiaxing	Yang Yanzhi

=== Pommel Horse ===
Year	Location	Gold	Silver	Bronze
2001	Guangzhou, Guangdong	Chen Feng	Li Di	Xiao Qin
2005	Nanjing, Jiangsu	Xiao Qin	Teng Haibin	Zhang Hongtao
2009	Shandong	Xiao Qin	Zhang Hongtao	Lu Chenxi
2013	Liaoning	Xiao Qin	Zhang Hongtao	Fu Yu
2017	Tianjin	Weng Hao	Yan Renpeng	Xiao Ruoteng
2021	Shaanxi	Weng Hao	Sun Wei	Zou Jingyuan
2025	Guangdong, Hong Kong, Macau	Lu Chongcan	Yan Renpeng	Zou Jingyuan

=== Still Rings ===
Year	Location	Gold	Silver	Bronze
2001	Guangzhou, Guangdong	Dong Zhen	Zhong Jian	Xie Jianhui
2005	Nanjing, Jiangsu	Huang Xu	Dong Zhen	Yan Mingyong
2009	Shandong	Yan Mingyong	Xie Jianhui	Chen Yibing
2013	Liaoning	Yan Mingyong	Liu Yang	Liao Junlin
2017	Tianjin	Liu Yang	Yan Mingyong	Wu Guanhua
2021	Shaanxi	Liu Yang	Lan Xingyu	You Hao
2025	Guangdong, Hong Kong, Macau	Liu Yang	Lan Xingyu	You Hao

=== Vault ===
Year	Location	Gold	Silver	Bronze
2001	Guangzhou, Guangdong	Li Xiaopeng	Zhong Dekai	Lu Bin
2005	Nanjing, Jiangsu	Li Xiaopeng	Lu Bin	Du Wei
2009	Shandong	Lu Bin	Du Wei	Tong Yingjie
2013	Liaoning	Qu Ruiyang	Zhang Zhongbo	Cheng Ran
2017	Tianjin	Huang Mingqi	Qu Ruiyang	Cen Yu
2021	Shaanxi	Huang Mingqi	Chen Yilu	Chen Zhilong
2025	Guangdong, Hong Kong, Macau	Chen Yilu	Chen Zhilong	Zhang Zhishan

=== Parallel Bars ===
Year	Location	Gold	Silver	Bronze
2001	Guangzhou, Guangdong	Li Xiaopeng	Huang Xu	Liang Fuliang
2005	Nanjing, Jiangsu	Li Xiaopeng	Feng Zhe	Dong Zhendong
2009	Shandong	Feng Zhe	Wang Wangyin	Teng Haibin
2013	Liaoning	Zhou Shixiong	Feng Zhe	Deng Shudi
2017	Tianjin	Zou Jingyuan	Liu Rongbin	Lin Chaopan
2021	Shaanxi	Zou Jingyuan	You Hao	Du Yixin
2025	Guangdong, Hong Kong, Macau	Zou Jingyuan	Zhang Boheng	Shi Cong

=== Horizontal Bar ===
Year	Location	Gold	Silver	Bronze
2001	Guangzhou, Guangdong	Xing Aowei	Lu Yufu	Yang Wei
2005	Nanjing, Jiangsu	Chong Wei	Xing Aowei	Li Kuan Yew
2009	Shandong	Zou Kai	Guo Weiyang	Lu Junhai
2013	Liaoning	Zou Kai	Zhou Shixiong	Chen Xuezhang
2017	Tianjin	Zhang Chenglong	Tan Di	Lin Chaopan
2021	Shaanxi	Hu Xuwei	Lin Chaopan	Deng Shudi
2025	Guangdong, Hong Kong, Macau	Zhang Boheng	He Xiang	Xiao Ruoteng

== Women's medalists ==
=== Team ===
Year	Location	Gold	Silver	Bronze
2001	Guangzhou, Guangdong	Guangdong	Hunan	Beijing
2005	Nanjing, Jiangsu	Guangdong	Hunan	Jiangsu
2009	Shandong	Shanghai	Guangdong	Beijing
2013	Liaoning	Shanghai	Zhejiang	Hunan
2017	Tianjin	Guangdong	Beijing	Shanghai
2021	Shaanxi	Guangdong	Anhui	Beijing
2025	Guangdong, Hong Kong, Macau	Zhejiang	Guangdong	Hubei

=== All-around ===
Year	Location	Gold	Silver	Bronze
2001	Guangzhou, Guangdong	Kang Xin	Qi Linzi	Dong Fangxiao
2005	Nanjing, Jiangsu	Fan Ye	Cheng Fei	Zhang Nan
2009	Shandong	Deng Linlin	Yang Yilin	Sui Lu
2013	Liaoning	Shang Chunsong Yao Jinnan	None awarded	Deng Linlin
2017	Tianjin	Chen Yile	Liu Tingting	Wang Yan
2021	Shaanxi	Wei Xiaoyuan	Ou Yushan	Luo Rui
2025	Guangdong, Hong Kong, Macau	Ke Qinqin	Qiu Qiyuan	Zhang Qingying

=== Vault ===
Year	Location	Gold	Silver	Bronze
2001	Guangzhou, Guangdong	Yang Yahong	Liu Wei	Liu Jiamin
2005	Nanjing, Jiangsu	Cheng Fei	Deng Ying	Deng Shaojie
2009	Shandong	Yang Pei	Zhou Qiaohong	Shi Xiaolu
2013	Liaoning	Li Yiting	Deng Yalan	Yang Pei
2017	Tianjin	Wang Yan	Yu Linmin	Wu Jing
2021	Shaanxi	Yu Linmin	Deng Yalan	Qi Qi
2025	Guangdong, Hong Kong, Macau	Deng Yalan	Yu Linmin	Liu Jinru

=== Uneven Bars ===
Year	Location	Gold	Silver	Bronze
2001	Guangzhou, Guangdong	Peng Sha	Chen Miaojie	Song Fangfang
2005	Nanjing, Jiangsu	Zhang Yufei	Huang Lu	He Ning
2009	Shandong	He Kexin	Yang Yilin	Wu Liufang
2013	Liaoning	Shang Chunsong	Yao Jinnan	Huang Huidan
2017	Tianjin	Fan Yilin	Du Siyu	Lyu Jiaqi
2021	Shaanxi	Fan Yilin	Lu Yufei	Wei Xiaoyuan
2025	Guangdong, Hong Kong, Macau	Qiu Qiyuan	Zhong Yu	Qin Xinyi

=== Balance Beam ===
Year	Location	Gold	Silver	Bronze
2001	Guangzhou, Guangdong	Sun Xiaojiao	Li Xuehong	Xu Yiting
2005	Nanjing, Jiangsu	Han Bing	Zhang Nan	Zhang Yufei
2009	Shandong	Tan Sixin	Cui Jie	Sui Lu
2013	Liaoning	Tan Sixin	Sui Lu	Shang Chunsong
2017	Tianjin	Li Qi	Chen Yile	Tang Xijing
2021	Shaanxi	Zhou Yaqin	Ou Yushan	Qiu Qiyuan
2025	Guangdong, Hong Kong, Macau	Ke Qinqin	Zhang Xinyi	Zhang Qingying

=== Floor Exercise ===
Year	Location	Gold	Silver	Bronze
2001	Guangzhou, Guangdong	Dong Fangxiao	Wang Yuyu	Huang Jing
2005	Nanjing, Jiangsu	Zhang Nan	Fan Ye	Cheng Fei
2009	Shandong	Sui Lu	Yang Ruxue	Deng Linlin
2013	Liaoning	Shang Chunsong	Sui Lu	Tan Sixin
2017	Tianjin	Wang Yan	Chen Yile	Liu Tingting
2021	Shaanxi	Ou Yushan	Zuo Tong	He Licheng
2025	Guangdong, Hong Kong, Macau	Zhao Jiayi	Ke Qinqin	Zhang Qi
