= Fan Yilin =

Chinese artistic gymnast

- 范忆琳
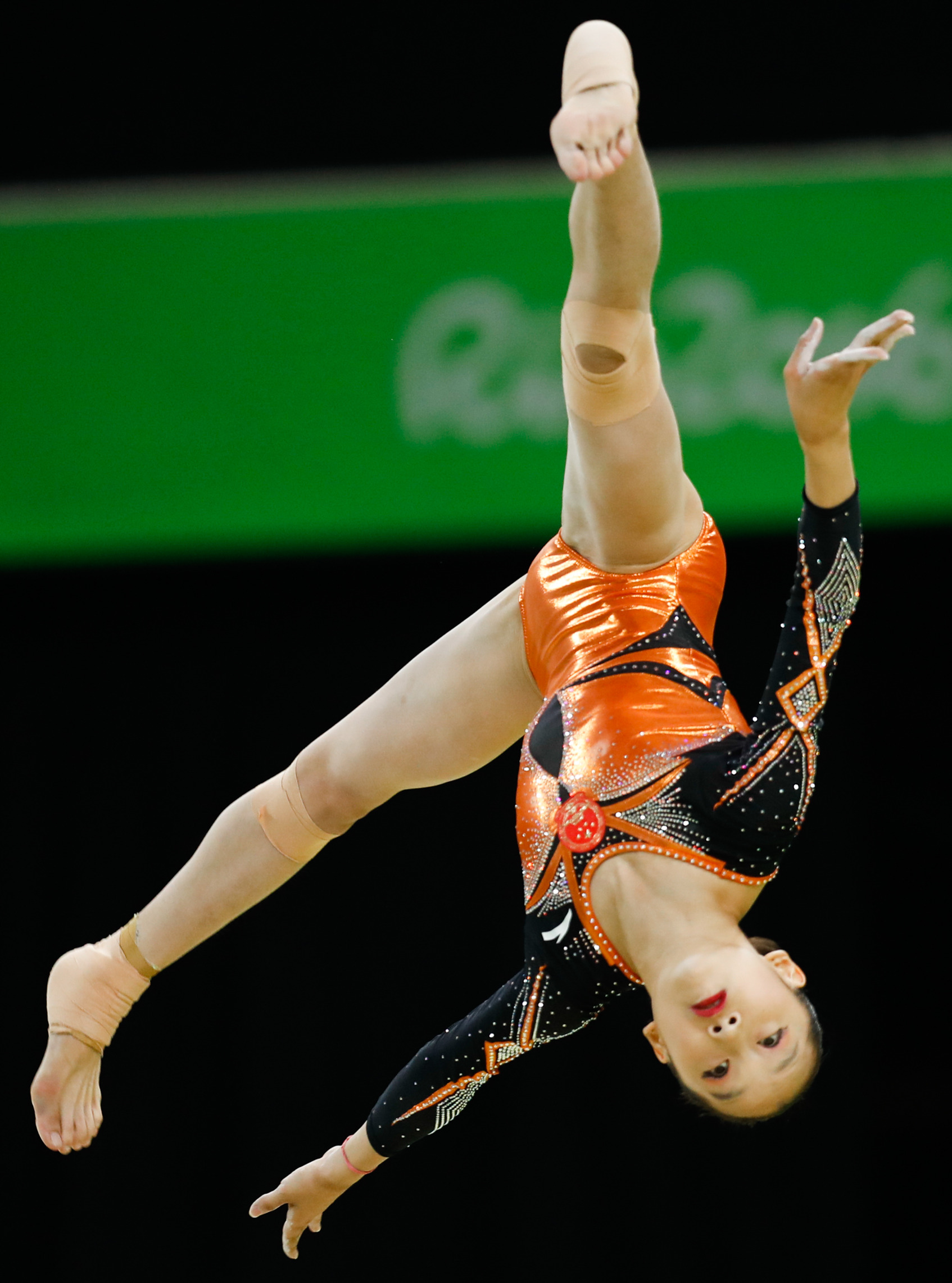
- Fan Yilin at the 2016 Olympic balance beam final

Personal information
- Nickname: Fan Fan
- Born: November 11, 1999 (age 27) Taizhou, Zhejiang, China
- Height: 1.48 m (4 ft 10 in)

Gymnastics career
- Discipline: Women's artistic gymnastics
- Country represented: China; (2014–2021)
- Head coaches: Lu Lifeng; Zhang Haiyan; Zhou Shiping; Qiao Liang
- Former coaches: Wang Qunce; Xu Jinglei
- Choreographer: Zhou Jie
- Eponymous skills: Fan (C): L-grip swing to half turn to double tucked salto backward dismount (uneven bars)
Medal record
Representing China
Olympic Games
| Bronze medal – third place | 2016 Rio de Janeiro | Team |
World Championships
| Gold medal – first place | 2015 Glasgow | Uneven bars |
| Gold medal – first place | 2017 Montreal | Uneven bars |
| Silver medal – second place | 2015 Glasgow | Team |
Asian Championships
| Gold medal – first place | 2015 Hiroshima | Balance beam |
| Silver medal – second place | 2015 Hiroshima | Team |
| Bronze medal – third place | 2015 Hiroshima | Uneven bars |
National Games
| Gold medal – first place | 2013 Liaoning | Team |
| Gold medal – first place | 2017 Tianjin | Uneven bars |
| Gold medal – first place | 2021 Shaanxi | Uneven bars |
| Bronze medal – third place | 2017 Tianjin | Team |

Fan Yilin (simplified Chinese: 范忆琳; traditional Chinese: 范憶琳; pinyin: Fàn Yìlín; born 11 November 1999) is a Chinese artistic gymnast and uneven bars specialist. She is a two-time world champion on the uneven bars (2015 and 2017) and the 2015 Asian champion on balance beam. At the 2015 World Championships, she was part of the first ever four-way tie along with Viktoria Komova, Daria Spiridonova, and Madison Kocian. Domestically, she is a four-time Chinese national uneven bars champion (2015, 2016, 2020, and 2021). She was a member of the Chinese team at the 2016 Summer Olympics, where she won a bronze medal in the team competition, and competed at the 2020 Olympic Games.

== Early life ==
Fan Yilin was born on 11 November 1999 in Taizhou, Zhejiang. Her father, Fan Bingzhu, is a former professional wrestler. Fan began gymnastics at the age of six in order to improve her health since she had been ill as a child.

== Junior gymnastics career ==
In 2013, Fan represented Zhejiang in the 1999–2000 Junior National Championships. The team won gold overall, and Fan placed fifth in the uneven bars final. At the 2013 Chinese National Games, Fan won team gold again and placed fourth on uneven bars. She did not compete in 2014 due to injuries.

== Senior gymnastics career ==
=== 2015 ===
Fan's senior career started in 2015. At the Chinese National Championships in May, Fan won gold in uneven bars final, ahead of world champion Huang Huidan In addition, she won silver with the Shanghai team and placed third on balance beam. She later made her senior international debut as a member of the Chinese team at the 2015 Asian Championships in Hiroshima, Japan, where she won gold on balance beam, silver with the team, and bronze on uneven bars.

She was selected to compete at the World Championships in Glasgow, Scotland alongside Shang Chunsong, Wang Yan, Mao Yi, Tan Jiaxin, Chen Siyi, and Zhu Xiaofang (alternate). They won the silver medal behind the United States team. Individually, after qualifying in fifth-place, Fan won gold on uneven bars in the first ever four-way tie along with Viktoria Komova, Daria Spiridonova, and Madison Kocian. "It made me laugh to see four gymnasts with the same score, but I'm happy for all of the other gold medalists," Fan said.

=== 2016 ===
Fan competed at the Chinese National Championships in May, and she won gold on uneven bars with a 0.434 lead, and she placed sixth on beam. At the conclusion of the Chinese Championships, Fan was named to the Chinese team for the 2016 Summer Olympics along with Shang Chunsong, Mao Yi, Wang Yan, and Liu Tingting (who was later replaced by alternate Tan Jiaxin due to a hand injury).

==== 2016 Rio de Janeiro Olympics ====
Fan competed in the women's qualification round at the 2016 Summer Olympics on August 7, scoring 15.266 on bars, 14.866 on beam, and 13.500 on floor exercise. She helped the Chinese team qualify into the team final in second place behind the United States. Individually, Fan qualified sixth into the balance beam final. Controversially, Fan failed to qualify for the uneven bars final placing ninth due to missing some connections in her routine. Her countrywoman Shang Chunsong qualified ahead of her by 0.034.

On August 9, in the team final, Fan competed on the uneven bars and the balance beam, contributing 15.733 and 15.066 respectively to China's third-place finish behind the United States and the Russian teams. Fan placed sixth in the balance beam final on August 15 with a score of 14.500.

=== 2017 ===
Fan competed at the National Championships, placing third on the uneven bars and seventh on balance beam. She was not named to the team competing at the Asian Championships. However, she performed well at the National Games later in the year and won gold on uneven bars. She was named to the team roster to compete at the World Championships along with Liu Tingting, Luo Huan, and Wang Yan.

In the qualifying round at the World Championships, Fan qualified into the uneven bars final in third place and successfully landed her original dismount, after which it was named after her in the Code of Points. Fan won the uneven bars final with a 15.166 ahead of Elena Eremina of Russia and Nina Derwael of Belgium after upgrading from the first day of competition to have the highest difficulty score in the final. With this victory, she became the first Chinese woman and the fourth overall gymnast in history to defend their World uneven bars title after Maxi Gnauck, Daniela Silivas, and Svetlana Khorkina.

=== 2018 ===
Fan did not compete for much of the year, missing both the Chinese National Championships in the spring and the Asian Games in August. However, she competed at the Individual National Championships, where she won gold on the uneven bars. Despite this result, she was not chosen to compete at the World Championships. Because she missed the World Championships, she became eligible to qualify an individual nominative spot to the 2020 Summer Olympics in Tokyo, Japan as the winner of the 2018–2020 Individual Apparatus World Cup series on the uneven bars, based on the new qualification rules introduced following the 2016 Summer Olympics.

Fan returned to international competition at the Cottbus World Cup, where she qualified in first place to the uneven bars final ahead of new world champion Nina Derwael; however, in the final, she fell on her eponymous dismount and placed eighth.

=== 2019 ===
Fan was selected to compete at the Melbourne World Cup alongside countrywoman Lyu Jiaqi, who she beat to win gold in the uneven bars final. She later competed at the Doha World Cup in March, where she qualified to the uneven bars final in second place behind Nina Derwael. In the event finals, she once again placed second behind Derwael.

At the 2019 Chinese National Championships, Fan qualified in first place on the uneven bars with a score of 15.200. In the team final, she recorded the top uneven bars score of the day to contribute toward the Shanghai provincial team's 7th-place finish. In the event final, however, a major error on a half-turn caused Fan to place fourth behind Liu Tingting, Cheng Shiyi, and Ou Yushan.

Fan was not included in the selection pool for the Chinese team at the 2019 World Championships due to her participation in the world cup series. Instead, she competed at the individual national championships in September and defended her uneven bars title ahead of Du Siyu and Lv Jiaqi. Fan concluded her year by competing at the 2019 Cottbus World Cup in November, qualifying in second place to the uneven bars final behind Anastasia Agafonova of Russia. In the final, she upgraded her routine to narrowly finish ahead of Agafonova and compatriot Yin Sisi.

=== 2020 ===
Fan competed at the Baku World Cup, where she finished first on uneven bars during qualifications and qualified to the event final. However, event finals were canceled due to the 2020 coronavirus outbreak in Azerbaijan. Later, FIG announced that the qualifications standings from the Baku event would count towards points in the Individual Apparatus World Cup series. As a result, Fan clinched a first-place overall standing on the uneven bars and unofficially qualified to the 2020 Summer Olympics as an individual athlete for China. These Olympics were later postponed to 2021 due to the COVID-19 pandemic.

In September, she competed at the National Championships, where she won gold on the uneven bars and placed sixth with the Shanghai provincial team. This marked her first national uneven bars title since 2016, despite recording the top international uneven bars score among all Chinese athletes every year since then.

== Skills ==
=== Selected competitive skills ===
| Apparatus | Name | Description | Difficulty (Note: Valid for the 2017–2020 Code of Points) | Performed |
|---|---|---|---|---|
| Uneven bars | Healy | Reverse grip swing to full (1/1) pirouette to L-grip | E | 2015–2020 |
| Uneven bars | Inbar 1/1 | Inbar to full (1/1) pirouette | E | 2015–2020 |
| Uneven bars | Komova II | Inbar Shaposhnikova transition to high bar | E | 2015–2020 |
| Uneven bars | Ling | L-grip swing to full (1/1) pirouette to L-grip | E | 2015–2020 |
| Uneven bars | Ling 1/2 | L-grip swing to 540° (1½) pirouette to reverse grip | E | 2016 |
| Balance beam | Layout | Laid out salto backwards with legs together (to two feet) | E | 2015–2017 |
| Balance beam | Switch ring | Switch leap to ring position (180° split with raised back leg) | E | 2015–2017 |
| Balance beam | Triple twist | Dismount: triple-twisting (3/1) laid out salto backward | F | 2015–2017 |
| Floor exercise | Triple twist | Triple-twisting (3/1) laid out salto backward | E | 2016 |

=== Eponymous skill ===
Fan has an uneven bars dismount named after her in the Code of Points.

| Apparatus | Name | Description | Difficulty (Note: Valid for the 2025–2028 Code of Points) | Added to the Code of Points |
|---|---|---|---|---|
| Uneven bars | Fan | From L-grip swing to half turn to double tucked salto backward | C (0.3) | 2017 World Championships |

== Competitive history ==
Competitive history of Fan Yilin
| Year | Event | Team | AA | VT | UB | BB | FX |
|---|---|---|---|---|---|---|---|
| 2013 | Chinese Championships | 1st place, gold medalist(s) | | | 5 | | |
| 2013 | National Games | 1st place, gold medalist(s) | | | 4 | | |
| 2014 | Did not compete | | | | | | |
| 2015 | Chinese Championships | 2nd place, silver medalist(s) | | | 1st place, gold medalist(s) | 3rd place, bronze medalist(s) | |
| 2015 | Asian Championships | 2nd place, silver medalist(s) | | | 3rd place, bronze medalist(s) | 1st place, gold medalist(s) | |
| 2015 | World Championships | 2nd place, silver medalist(s) | | | 1st place, gold medalist(s) | | |
| 2016 | Chinese Championships | 3rd place, bronze medalist(s) | | | 1st place, gold medalist(s) | 6 | |
| 2016 | Olympic Games | 3rd place, bronze medalist(s) | | | | 6 | |
| 2017 | Chinese Championships | 5 | | | 3rd place, bronze medalist(s) | 7 | |
| 2017 | National Games | 3rd place, bronze medalist(s) | | | 1st place, gold medalist(s) | | |
| 2017 | World Championships | | | | 1st place, gold medalist(s) | | |
| 2018 | Chinese Individual Championships | | | | 1st place, gold medalist(s) | | |
| 2018 | Cottbus World Cup | | | | 8 | | |
| 2019 | Melbourne World Cup | | | | 1st place, gold medalist(s) | | |
| 2019 | Doha World Cup | | | | 2nd place, silver medalist(s) | | |
| 2019 | Chinese Championships | 7 | | | 4 | | |
| 2019 | Chinese Individual Championships | | | | 1st place, gold medalist(s) | | |
| 2019 | Cottbus World Cup | | | | 1st place, gold medalist(s) | | |
| 2020 | Baku World Cup | | | | (Note: Fan qualified to the UB final in first place; however event finals were canceled.) | | |
| 2020 | Chinese Championships | 6 | | | 1st place, gold medalist(s) | | |
| 2021 | Chinese Championships | 7 | | | 1st place, gold medalist(s) | | |
| 2021 | Olympic Games | | | | 7 | | |
| 2021 | National Games | | | | 1st place, gold medalist(s) | | |
