= Liu Tingting (gymnast) =

Chinese artistic gymnast

Liu Tingting 刘婷婷
- Full name: Liu Tingting
- Born: 6 September 2000 (age 26) Guangzhou, China

Gymnastics career
- Discipline: Women's artistic gymnastics
- Country represented: China; (2013–2021)
Medal record
Representing China
Event	1st	2nd	3rd
World Championships	1	1	1
Asian Games	2	0	0
Asian Championships	3	1	0
Pacific Rim Championships (Junior)	0	0	2
Total	6	2	3
World Championships
Gold medal – first place	2018 Doha	Balance beam
Silver medal – second place	2019 Stuttgart	Balance beam
Bronze medal – third place	2018 Doha	Team
Asian Games
Gold medal – first place	2018 Jakarta	Team
Gold medal – first place	2018 Jakarta	Uneven bars
Asian Championships
Gold medal – first place	2017 Bangkok	Team
Gold medal – first place	2017 Bangkok	All-around
Gold medal – first place	2017 Bangkok	Balance beam
Silver medal – second place	2017 Bangkok	Uneven bars
Pacific Rim Championships (Junior)
Bronze medal – third place	2014 Richmond	Team
Bronze medal – third place	2014 Richmond	Uneven bars
National Games
Gold medal – first place	2017 Tianjin	Team
Gold medal – first place	2021 Shaanxi	Team
Silver medal – second place	2017 Tianjin	All-around
Bronze medal – third place	2017 Tianjin	Floor exercise

Liu Tingting (simplified Chinese: 刘婷婷; traditional Chinese: 劉婷婷; pinyin: Liú Tíngtíng; born September 6, 2000, Guangdong) is a retired Chinese artistic gymnast and was the team captain of the Chinese women's national artistic gymnastics team. She is best known for her innovative, quick connections and high degree of difficulty on the balance beam and uneven bars. She is the 2018 World champion, the 2019 World silver medalist, and the 2017 Asian champion on the balance beam, and the 2018 Asian Games and 2019 Chinese national champion on the uneven bars. She has also often competed in the all-around event in her senior career, where she is the 2017 Asian champion and a two-time Chinese national (2019, 2020) champion.

== Junior career ==
=== 2013 ===
Liu's national senior level competition debut was at the 2013 Chinese National Championships. Representing the province of Guangdong, she qualified in fifth place at the all-around final and seventh place in the balance beam final. Initially, she qualified as the alternate in the floor exercise final, but ultimately entered the final after Jiang Tong withdrew. In the team final, Liu contributed counted scores in all four events and ultimately won the silver medal. She then placed sixth in the all-around final, where she was the top-scoring junior. She concluded the competition with an eighth-place finish in the balance beam final and a fifth in the floor exercise final.

Liu also competed at the senior-level 2013 National Games, a multi-sport event with nearly 10,000 participating athletes, where she placed fourth with her provincial team.

=== 2014: Junior National Champion ===
Liu made her international debut the following year at the 2014 Pacific Rim Championships in April, where she won a bronze medal with the team and qualified to all five junior individual finals. She recorded the fifth-highest total score in the junior individual all-around behind Bailie Key, Nia Dennis, and Norah Flatley of the United States and countrywoman Luo Huan, although after Flatley's exclusion due to the two-per-country rule she placed fourth. She then placed third in the junior uneven bars final behind Luo and Key and seventh in the junior vault, balance beam, and floor exercise finals. These championships were the first of many events throughout Liu and Luo's careers where they competed together, often placing closely in the all-around and event finals.

Liu then competed at the senior-level 2014 Chinese National Championships in May. She led her provincial team to the silver medal, once again contributing counting scores in every event. Her vault and uneven bars scores were both top-five among all gymnasts in the team final. She then placed ninth in the individual all-around final, sixth in the uneven bars final, and fifth in the floor exercise final. She won her first individual national medal by placing third in the balance beam final behind Shang Chunsong and Bai Yawen.

Liu dominated at her final competition of the year in June, the National Junior Championships. She won the all-around, uneven bars, and floor exercise titles, placed second in vault behind Liu Jinru, and second in balance beam behind Zhang Wenxin.

=== 2015 ===
Liu's first major competition of the year was the 2015 Chinese National Championships at the end of May, marking her third time competing at the senior-level championships. Liu qualified in second place to the all-around final, behind only Wang Yan, third place to the uneven bars final behind Fan Yilin and Tan Jiaxin, and fourth place to the floor exercise final. In the team competition, Liu once again led the Guangdong provincial team to the podium, winning a team bronze medal. In the all-around final, a fall on the balance beam caused her to place sixth, although she was still the top-placing junior athlete ahead of Luo Huan. In event finals, Liu placed eighth in uneven bars and fifth in floor exercise.

Liu competed two weeks later at the national junior championships, entering as the defending champion. She qualified to the all-around final in first place and to all four event finals. She then placed second in the team final with her provincial team, which included for the first time Chen Yile. In the all-around final, Liu defended her title to win the gold medal, placing three points ahead of runner-up Luo Huan. In event finals, Liu performed very well. She placed first in balance beam, second in uneven bars behind Luo, third in vault behind Liu Jinru and Zhang Jin, and fourth in floor exercise. Interestingly, Liu Tingting, Luo Huan, Chen Yile, Zhang Jin, and Liu Jinru were the five members of the world championships team three years later.

Based on her results at the senior- and junior-level national championships, Liu was selected to compete at the Junior Japan International in September, a major international meet for junior-level competitors. Although she was considered a podium threat for the all-around, mistakes in the floor exercise in the all-around final ultimately resulted in a fifth-place finish. She then placed fifth in the uneven bars final, but then concluded her competition by rebounding to win the gold medal in the balance beam, ahead of American junior national champions Laurie Hernandez and Jazmyn Foberg. This marked Liu's first international gold medal.

Liu's final junior competition was the National Youth Games, a quadrennial multi-sport event for Chinese athletes under the age of 21, in October. Although Guangdong did not field a full team, Liu individually won gold medals in the all-around, uneven bars, and balance beam finals. She had the top score in every single event in the all-around final, and the highest difficulty score in both event finals. She also placed third in floor exercise. These results cemented Liu as a contender for the Chinese team in the coming Olympic year.

== Senior career ==
=== 2016: Debut ===
After competing at the junior level for three years nationally and two years internationally, Liu made her senior debut at just 15 years of age at the 2016 Chinese National Championships in May. In the first round, Liu performed very well, qualifying to the all-around final in second place behind reigning national champion Shang Chunsong and to three event finals: bars in second place, beam in third place, and floor in sixth place. In the all-around final, Liu fell on her double-twisting Yurchenko vault and made mistakes in beam, ultimately finishing in third place by more than a point behind Shang and just two tenths behind Mao Yi. In event finals, Liu won the silver medal in balance beam, once again behind Shang. She finished fifth in uneven bars after a mistake in her pirouette, and fifth in floor exercise with a clean routine.

The following week, Liu was named to the nominative roster for the 5-member Chinese Rio de Janeiro Olympic women's artistic gymnastics team along with 2015 World Championships team members Shang Chunsong, Mao Yi, Fan Yilin, and Wang Yan. However, on July 18, it was announced that she had suffered a hand injury while training on uneven bars and would be replaced by 19-year-old Tan Jiaxin, a two-time World team silver medalist in 2014 and 2015. Liu did not compete for the remainder of the season.

=== 2017: Asian All-Around Champion ===
Liu's delayed senior international debut finally came at the 2017 Melbourne World Cup in February, where she competed alongside Olympian Wang Yan and Luo Huan. Liu qualified first in balance beam, second in floor exercise, and third in uneven bars. She went on to place first in uneven bars ahead of Huan and Rianna Mizzen of Australia, first in balance beam ahead of reigning Olympic Champion Sanne Wevers of the Netherlands and Emily Little, and third in floor exercise behind Australians Little and Georgia Godwin.

In March, Liu competed again on the World Cup circuit alongside Wang Yan and Luo Huan, this time at the event in Doha. In qualifications, Liu once again advanced to three event finals by placing second in uneven bars, first in balance beam, and first in floor exercise. In event finals, she fell in the uneven bars to place fourth behind Luo, Zsófia Kovács of Hungary, and Georgia-Rose Brown of Australia. She rebounded to win the gold medal in both balance beam, ahead of 2004 Olympic Champion Catalina Ponor and Luo, and floor, ahead of Emily Little and Croatian Ana Đerek.

In May, Liu competed the all-around for the first time in over a year at her fifth consecutive Chinese National Championships. She qualified in third place to the all around final, competing a full-twisting Yurchenko vault as opposed to the double-twisting Yurchenko she competed in 2016, and qualified to the floor exercise final in first place. In the team final, Liu's Guangdong provincial team won gold by a large margin ahead of Beijing, marking Liu's first gold medal at the senior national championships. She was one of the favorites to win the all-around title along with top qualifiers Luo Huan and provincial teammate Chen Yile, but pulled out of the all-around final after a minor injury. She returned for the floor exercise final and won the silver medal behind Olympian Shang Chunsong.

Two weeks later, Liu competed at the 2017 Asian Championships in Bangkok, Thailand as a member of the Chinese team alongside Luo Huan, Liu Jinru, and Tan Jiaxin. They won the team gold medal by nearly ten points ahead of North Korea and nearly 20 points ahead of Japan. In the all-around final, Liu recorded the top score in uneven bars, balance beam, and floor exercise to win the gold medal over reigning national all-around champion Luo and qualify in first place to those three event finals. This win marked Liu's first senior and first international all-around title. Her score in the balance beam in the all-around of 15.300 was the top international score on the apparatus of the entire 2017 season. In the event finals, she placed second in uneven bars behind Luo, first in balance beam ahead of Luo, and fourth in floor exercise in a tie with Luo. These results made Liu, Luo, and Kim Su-Jong of North Korea the most decorated female athletes of the championships, with four medals each.

In September, Liu was named to the nominative roster for the Chinese team for the 2017 World Championships to compete the all-around alongside Luo Huan, with specialists Wang Yan and Fan Yilin rounding out the team. Shortly after, Liu competed as a member of the Guangdong provincial team at the 2017 National Games. She upgraded to a double-twisting Yurchenko vault for the first time since the 2016 National Championships and contributed performances in all four events in the team final to the gold medal. In the all-around final, Liu recorded the top score in beam and won the silver medal behind junior provincial teammate Chen Yile and ahead of Wang and Luo. In event finals, she placed eighth in bars, fourth in beam behind juniors Li Qi, Chen, and Tang Xijing, and third in floor behind Wang and Chen.

Although Liu was considered to be a contender for an all-around medal and a frontrunner for the balance beam title at the start of the World Championships in Montreal, Canada, an ankle injury suffered during training limited Liu to just competing in the balance beam in the qualification round. While she qualified into the balance beam final in seventh place, she ultimately placed seventh in the final with a tentative routine due to her injury. While Liu's routine difficulty relied primarily on connecting many skills for bonuses, the injury forced her to pause between many of her skills. As such, her awarded difficulty score (5.5) was a full point less than the score she received when healthy (6.5) at the Asian Championships in May.

=== 2018: World Balance Beam Champion ===
Following recovery from her ankle injury, Liu competed in May at the 2018 Chinese National Championships representing Guangdong province, although she did not compete floor exercise to avoid re-injuring her ankle. In qualification, Liu tied with new senior gymnast and teammate Chen Yile for fourth place in uneven bars and placed second in balance beam behind Chen to advance to both event finals. In the team finals, Guangdong repeated as champion, with Liu contributing scores in vault, uneven bars (recording the highest score of all competitors in the team final), and balance beam. In event finals, she placed sixth in both uneven bars and balance beam after mistakes in both finals.

In August, Liu was named to the Chinese team for the 2018 Asian Games, a quadrennial multi-sport international competition with nearly 12,000 competitors, in Jakarta, Indonesia. Her teammates included Chen Yile, Liu Jinru, Zhang Jin, and Li Qi (who later withdrew and was replaced by reigning national champion Luo Huan). In qualifications, Liu competed only in uneven bars, where she qualified in first place to the event final, and balance beam, where she scored the fourth-best score of all competitors, but did not qualify to the final as her teammates Chen, Zhang, and Luo all placed higher. In team finals, Liu competed in vault instead of Chen, uneven bars, and balance beam, once again recording the highest score in uneven bars among all competitors. In the event final, she delivered yet another strong routine to win the Asian Games uneven bars title by nearly half a point ahead of runner-up Luo.

Following the Asian Games, the entire team including Liu were named to the roster for the 2018 World Championships in Doha, Qatar. In the qualification round, Liu placed eight in balance beam, second on the Chinese team (behind Zhang Jin) to qualify for the event final after putting her hand down on her front tuck. She also placed ninth in uneven bars, second on the Chinese team (behind Luo Huan) and was named first alternate for that final. Overall, China qualified in third place to the team final, less than half a point behind Russia in second and more than nine points behind the United States in first place.

In the team final, Liu had an error in uneven bars but performed well in the balance beam despite falls from teammates Chen and Zhang, tying with Japanese Mai Murakami for the third-highest score among all competitors in the team final after American Kara Eaker and French Marine Boyer. China won the team bronze medal behind the United States and Russia, earning Liu her first World Championships medal.

In the balance beam event final, Liu competed last. The only competitor to have fully hit her routine, Ana Padurariu of Canada, sat at the top of the leaderboard, followed by Simone Biles of the United States who had made several smaller errors. Liu performed an exceptional routine featuring strong ring leaps and her signature front handspring-front tuck acrobatic series to take the gold medal in stunning fashion. Among the finalists, Liu earned both the highest difficulty (6.3) and the highest execution (8.233) scores, and she alone was awarded with her entire attempted connection value score. Liu became the sixth Chinese woman to win the World balance beam title and the first since Sui Lu in 2011. She left the World Championships as the third most decorated female gymnast after Biles and Morgan Hurd of the United States.

=== 2019: National Champion ===
Liu competed at the 2019 City of Jesolo Trophy in April alongside fellow World team member Zhang Jin and first-year seniors Qi Qi and Tang Xijing in Jesolo, Italy. There she won silver with the Chinese team, silver in the all-around behind Sunisa Lee of the United States, and gold in the balance beam final ahead of Americans Emma Malabuyo and Lee. She also placed fourth in the uneven bars behind Lee, Xijing, and Elisa Iorio of the home team Italy. Liu competed the all-around again after having not performed a floor exercise since the 2017 National Games. Additionally, her balance beam score of 14.967 during the all-around final was the third-highest international score of the year.

Liu next competed at her seventh consecutive Chinese National Championships in May, once again representing her provincial team of Guangdong. In the qualification round, Liu individually qualified to the all-around final in first place, the uneven bars final in second place behind two-time world champion Fan Yilin, the balance beam final in third place behind junior Ou Yushan and Luo Huan, and the floor exercise final tied for second place behind Zhang Jin. In the team final, Liu contributed scores in all four events to lead Guangdong to its third straight team gold medal.

In the all-around final, Liu hit all four of her routines cleanly and won her first senior Chinese national all-around title. Her score from the day of all-around competition was half a point higher than runner-up Luo and nearly a full point above bronze medalist Ou. During the all-around, she delivered the highest score in uneven bars, the third highest score in balance beam behind juniors Ou and Guan Chenchen, and the fifth highest in floor exercise. In the event finals, Liu continued performing very well. She won the Chinese uneven bars title ahead of Cheng Shiyi and Ou Yushan after a major error from pre-final favorite Fan Yilin, placed fourth in balance beam behind Ou, Tang Xijing, and Qi Qi, and third in floor exercise behind Shang Chunsong and Ou.

Liu did not compete again until October, when she was named as the captain of the Chinese team for the 2019 World Championships in Stuttgart, Germany alongside Chen Yile, Li Shijia, Qi Qi, Tang Xijing, and alternate Zhang Jin. This announcement made Liu the only Chinese gymnast to be a member of all three world championships teams during the 2017-2020 quadrennium.

In the qualification round, Liu competed the all-around along with Li and Tang, contributing counting scores in uneven bars, balance beam, and floor exercise. As a team, China qualified in second place, behind the United States by roughly five points and ahead of third-place Russia by roughly one point. Individually, Liu recorded the sixth-highest all-around score, just ahead of her teammate Li, but qualified into the all-around in fifth place after Grace McCallum's exclusion due to the two-per-country limit. Additionally, Liu qualified in sixth place to the uneven bars final (teammate Tang was the first alternate), and in third place to the balance beam final behind Simone Biles and Li.

In the team final, Liu performed below her usual standards. Competing last in uneven bars, she fell twice during her routine and scored nearly three points lower than her score in qualifications. In balance beam, another fall cost her roughly two points compared to her qualification routine. She rebounded in the floor exercise, but her final routine was not enough to prevent China from finishing fourth behind the United States, Russia, and Italy. Liu withdrew from the all-around final and was replaced by Tang, who had been affected by the two-per-country rule. During the first day of event finals, Liu hit a clean bars routine to finish seventh. She won her second consecutive medal in balance beam, a silver, behind Biles and ahead of Li.

=== 2020: National Champion again ===
After the 2020 Summer Olympics were postponed due to the COVID-19 pandemic, Liu competed at her eighth consecutive National Championships in September. Along with Luo Huan, who was also competing at her eighth consecutive national championships, Liu's eight consecutive appearances was the second-most among all athletes after 2016 Olympian Shang Chunsong. Although she was the reigning national champion, Liu was not considered the frontrunner for the all-around title because over the past year, multiple all-around competitors including Tang Xijing, Li Shijia, and new senior Ou Yushan had upgraded their vaults to the double-twisting Yurchenko, which Liu had not competed since 2016. Additionally, she had suffered from chickenpox a month prior and lost training time.

In the qualification round, which also served as the provincial team final, Liu decided to compete all four events to contribute toward the Guangdong team's total score after injuries forced teammate Ou Yushan to withdraw and limited teammate Chen Yile to competing only vault and beam. Liu ultimately led the Guangdong team to their fourth consecutive gold medal by scoring 56.00 in the all-around, the second highest all-around score for a senior Chinese gymnast of the 2017-2020 quad behind Tang Xijing's historic silver medal performance at the 2019 World Championships. Individually, Liu surprisingly qualified in first-place to the all-around final ahead of new seniors Guan Chenchen and Wei Xiaoyuan after errors from Tang dropped her to sixth and Li Shijia competed only in uneven bars due to injury. Liu also qualified in second place to the uneven bars final behind two-time world champion Fan Yilin, in third place to the balance beam final behind Guan and Wei, and in third place to the floor exercise final behind Qi Qi and reigning national floor champion Shang Chunsong. Liu debuted a new mount sequence in beam and new connections in bars.

In the all-around final, Liu won her second national title. Liu recorded the second-highest bars score of the day behind Wei and the second-highest floor score of the day behind Qi. Although Liu was narrowly outscored by Wei and Qi by 0.05 on the second day due to a fall in beam, Wei's own subsequent beam fall and Qi's low-scoring uneven bars routine prevented either from overcoming Liu's combined two day all-around total. Liu competed a strong floor exercise including a stuck double tuck to seal her title defense, with Wei settling for the silver and Qi taking bronze. During event finals, Liu won bronze the uneven bars behind Fan and Cheng Shiyi and bronze in balance beam behind Guan and Wei, which marked her 18th medal at the Chinese National Championships. She concluded her championships by placing fourth in floor exercise with the highest execution score in the final.

== Selected competitive skills ==
Apparatus	Name	Description	Difficulty (Note: Valid for the 2017-2020 Code of Points)	Performed
Vault	Baitova	Yurchenko entry, laid out salto backwards with two twists	5.4	2016-17
Uneven bars	Healy	Forward giant with 360° turn on one arm from reverse grip to L grip	E	2016-20
Uneven bars	Healy ½	Forward giant with 540° turn on one arm from reverse grip to regular grip	E	2017-18
Uneven bars	Ling	Forward giant with 360° turn on one arm from L grip to L grip	E	2016-20
Uneven bars	Ling ½	Forward giant with 540° turn on one arm from L grip to regular grip	E	2016, 2019
Uneven bars	Piked Jaeger	Reverse grip swing to piked salto forwards to catch high bar	E	2017
Uneven bars	Van Leeuwen	Toe-on Shaposhnikova transition with ½ twist to high bar	E	2017
Balance beam	Front pike	Mount: Piked salto forwards to cross stand to end of beam	E	2017
Balance beam	Switch ring	Switch leap to ring position (180° split with raised back leg)	E	2016-20
Floor exercise	Mitchell	1080° (3/1) turn in tuck stand on one leg	E	2020
Floor exercise	Triple twist	Salto backward straight with triple twist	E	2016-17, 2019

== Competitive history ==
Competitive history of Liu Tingting at the junior level
Year	Event	Team	AA	VT	UB	BB	FX
2013	National Championships	2nd place, silver medalist(s)	6			8	5
2013	National Games	4					
2014	Pacific Rim Championships	3rd place, bronze medalist(s)	4	7	3rd place, bronze medalist(s)	7	7
2014	National Championships	2nd place, silver medalist(s)	9		6	3rd place, bronze medalist(s)	5
2014	National Junior Championships		1st place, gold medalist(s)	2nd place, silver medalist(s)	1st place, gold medalist(s)	2nd place, silver medalist(s)	1st place, gold medalist(s)
2015	Li-Ning Cup Eastern Qualifier		1st place, gold medalist(s)				
2015	National Championships	3rd place, bronze medalist(s)	6		8		5
2015	National Junior Championships	2nd place, silver medalist(s)	1st place, gold medalist(s)	3rd place, bronze medalist(s)	2nd place, silver medalist(s)	1st place, gold medalist(s)	4
2015	Japan Junior International		5		5	1st place, gold medalist(s)	
2015	National Youth Games		1st place, gold medalist(s)		1st place, gold medalist(s)	1st place, gold medalist(s)	3rd place, bronze medalist(s)

Competitive history of Liu Tingting at the senior level
Year	Event	Team	AA	VT	UB	BB	FX
2016	National Championships	2nd place, silver medalist(s)	3rd place, bronze medalist(s)		5	2nd place, silver medalist(s)	5
2017	Melbourne World Cup				1st place, gold medalist(s)	1st place, gold medalist(s)	3rd place, bronze medalist(s)
2017	Doha World Cup				4	1st place, gold medalist(s)	1st place, gold medalist(s)
2017	National Championships	1st place, gold medalist(s)					2nd place, silver medalist(s)
2017	Asian Championships	1st place, gold medalist(s)	1st place, gold medalist(s)		2nd place, silver medalist(s)	1st place, gold medalist(s)	4
2017	National Games	1st place, gold medalist(s)	2nd place, silver medalist(s)		8	4	3rd place, bronze medalist(s)
2017	World Championships					7	
2018	National Championships	1st place, gold medalist(s)			6	6	
2018	Asian Games	1st place, gold medalist(s)			1st place, gold medalist(s)		
2018	World Championships	3rd place, bronze medalist(s)				1st place, gold medalist(s)	
2019	City of Jesolo Trophy	2nd place, silver medalist(s)	2nd place, silver medalist(s)		4	1st place, gold medalist(s)	
2019	National Championships	1st place, gold medalist(s)	1st place, gold medalist(s)		1st place, gold medalist(s)	4	3rd place, bronze medalist(s)
2019	World Championships	4	WD		7	2nd place, silver medalist(s)	
2020	National Championships	1st place, gold medalist(s)	1st place, gold medalist(s)		3rd place, bronze medalist(s)	3rd place, bronze medalist(s)	4
2021	National Championships	1st place, gold medalist(s)			4		
2021	National Games	1st place, gold medalist(s)					
