= Qi Qi (gymnast) =

Chinese artistic gymnast

Qi Qi 祁琦
- Full name: Qi Qi
- Born: September 28, 2003 (age 22) Beijing, China

Gymnastics career
- Discipline: Women's artistic gymnastics
- Country represented: China (2017–Present (CHN))
- Head coaches: He Hua, Wang Liming
Medal record
National Games
Silver medal – second place	2017 Tianjin	Team
Bronze medal – third place	2021 Shaanxi	Team
Bronze medal – third place	2021 Shaanxi	Vault

Qi Qi (Chinese: 祁琦; pinyin: Qí Qí, [t͡ɕʰi˧ t͡ɕʰi˧]; born September 28, 2003) is a Chinese artistic gymnast. Best known as a vault and floor specialist, she is a two-time Chinese national vault champion (2018, 2020), the 2020 Chinese national floor champion, and a ten-time medalist at the Chinese Artistic Gymnastics Championships. On the junior level, she is the 2018 Asian all-around, vault, and floor exercise champion.

== Career ==
=== Junior ===
==== 2017 ====
Qi competed at the senior-level 2017 Chinese National Championships, where she qualified in 16th place to the all-around final with the top vault score in the qualification round. She placed second in the team final representing the Beijing provincial team and also placed second in the vault final behind Liu Jinru. Qi was the only gymnast in the final to earn an execution score above 9.000 on either vault, which she achieved on her double-twisting Yurchenko (DTY).

==== 2018 ====
Qi won the gold medal as part of the Chinese team with He Licheng, Tang Xijing, Yin Sisi, and Zhao Shiting at the 2018 Junior Asian Championships in Jakarta, Indonesia. Individually, she won the all-around ahead of Zhao and Lee Yun-seo of South Korea, as well as both vault and floor. At the 2018 Chinese National Championships, Qi tied with Liu Jinru for the title on vault. She also won a second consecutive silver with the Beijing team and placed fourth in the floor final behind Liu, Yin Sisi, and Zhao Shiting.

=== Senior ===
==== 2019 ====
Qi made her senior international debut as a member of the Chinese team at the 2019 City of Jesolo Trophy with Liu Tingting, Tang Xijing, and Zhang Jin, where they won the silver medal behind the United States. She individually placed twelfth in the all-around and won bronze on floor behind Americans Sunisa Lee and Emma Malabuyo.

At the 2019 Chinese National Championships, Qi qualified in seventh place to the all-around final, third place to the vault final, and fifth place to the beam final. During the team final, which also served as the all-around final, Qi and Tang Xijing led the Beijing provincial team to a third consecutive silver medal. Qi recorded the top vault and floor scores of the day and landed the Silivas (double-twisting double tuck) skill on floor exercise for the first time in competition. Individually, Qi improved her ranking from qualifications to finish sixth all-around. In event finals, Qi upgraded her second vault to a Chusovitina to win the silver medal behind Liu Jinru and won bronze on beam behind junior Ou Yushan and Tang.

In September, after recording the top floor score at the final internal test, Qi was named to the Chinese team for the 2019 World Championships in Stuttgart, Germany alongside Chen Yile, Li Shijia, Liu Tingting, Tang Xijing, and alternate Zhang Jin. In the qualification round, Qi competed on vault and floor to help the team qualify in second behind the United States. Qi was the last qualifier for the vault final, but did not make the floor final after electing not to compete the Silivas. In the team final, she hit both of her routines, but China finished in fourth behind the United States, Russia, and Italy after the team counted three falls. Qi finished fifth in the vault final.

==== 2020 ====
Qi competed at the 2020 Chinese National Championships in September. In the qualification round, which also served as the team final, she qualified in 5th place to the all-around final and in first place to both the vault and floor exercise finals. Qi and Tang Xijing led the Beijing provincial team to a fourth consecutive team silver medal. In the all-around final, Qi hit four routines cleanly to move up the rankings and win the bronze medal behind Liu Tingting and Wei Xiaoyuan. She recorded the highest score of the night on floor exercise by a wide margin after sticking her opening Silivas and introducing a one-and-a-half twist through to triple twist second tumbling pass, and recorded the second-highest vault score behind Zhang Jin.

In event finals, Qi won gold on vault ahead reigning Asian champion Yu Linmin and three-time and reigning national vault champion Liu Jinru. Qi recorded the highest difficulty score (5.8 for her Chusovitina) and the highest execution score (9.000 for her DTY) among all competitors. On the last day of competition, which coincided with her 17th birthday, Qi won her first national floor exercise title ahead of Wu Ran and Lu Yufei. Qi was the most decorated gymnast of the competition with two gold medals, a silver, and a bronze.

== Selected competitive skills ==
Apparatus	Name	Description	Difficulty	Performed
Vault	Baitova	Yurchenko entry, laid out salto backwards with two (2/1) twists	5.4	2019-2020
Vault	Chusovitina	Handspring entry, laid out salto backwards with 1 1/2 (3/2) twists	5.8	2019-2020
Uneven Bars	Double Layout 1/1	Dismount: Full-twisting (1/1) double laid out salto backwards	E	2019
Uneven Bars	Piked Jaeger	Reverse grip swing to piked salto forwards to catch high bar	E	2019-2020
Balance Beam	Layout	Salto backwards stretched with legs together	E	2019
Balance Beam	Switch Ring	Switch leap to ring position (180° split with raised back leg)	E	2019-2020
Balance Beam	Shishova	Full-twisting (1/1) tucked salto backwards	F	2019-2020
Balance Beam	Triple Twist	Dismount: laid out salto backwards with triple (3/1) twist	F	2019
Floor Exercise	Gómez	1440° (4/1) turn with leg below horizontal	E	2019
Floor Exercise	Mukhina	Double tucked salto backwards with full (1/1) twist	E	2019
Floor Exercise	Triple Twist	Laid out salto backwards with triple (3/1) twist	E	2019-2020
Floor Exercise	Silivas	Double tucked salto backwards with two (2/1) twists	H	2019-2020

== Competitive history ==
Year	Event	Team	AA	VT	UB	BB	FX
Junior
2016	Junior National Championships		6				
2017	National Championships	2nd place, silver medalist(s)		2nd place, silver medalist(s)			
2017	National Games	2nd place, silver medalist(s)		5			
2018	Junior Asian Championships	1st place, gold medalist(s)	1st place, gold medalist(s)	1st place, gold medalist(s)			1st place, gold medalist(s)
2018	National Championships	2nd place, silver medalist(s)		1st place, gold medalist(s)			4
Senior
2019	City of Jesolo Trophy	2nd place, silver medalist(s)	12	2nd place, silver medalist(s)			3rd place, bronze medalist(s)
2019	National Championships	2nd place, silver medalist(s)	6	2nd place, silver medalist(s)		3rd place, bronze medalist(s)	
2019	World Championships	4		5			
2020	National Championships	2nd place, silver medalist(s)	3rd place, bronze medalist(s)	1st place, gold medalist(s)			1st place, gold medalist(s)
2020	Individual National Championships			1st place, gold medalist(s)			
2021	National Championships	2nd place, silver medalist(s)	12				
2021	National Games	3rd place, bronze medalist(s)	11	3rd place, bronze medalist(s)			
2022	National Championships	12		4			
