= Wang Yan (gymnast) =

Chinese artistic gymnast

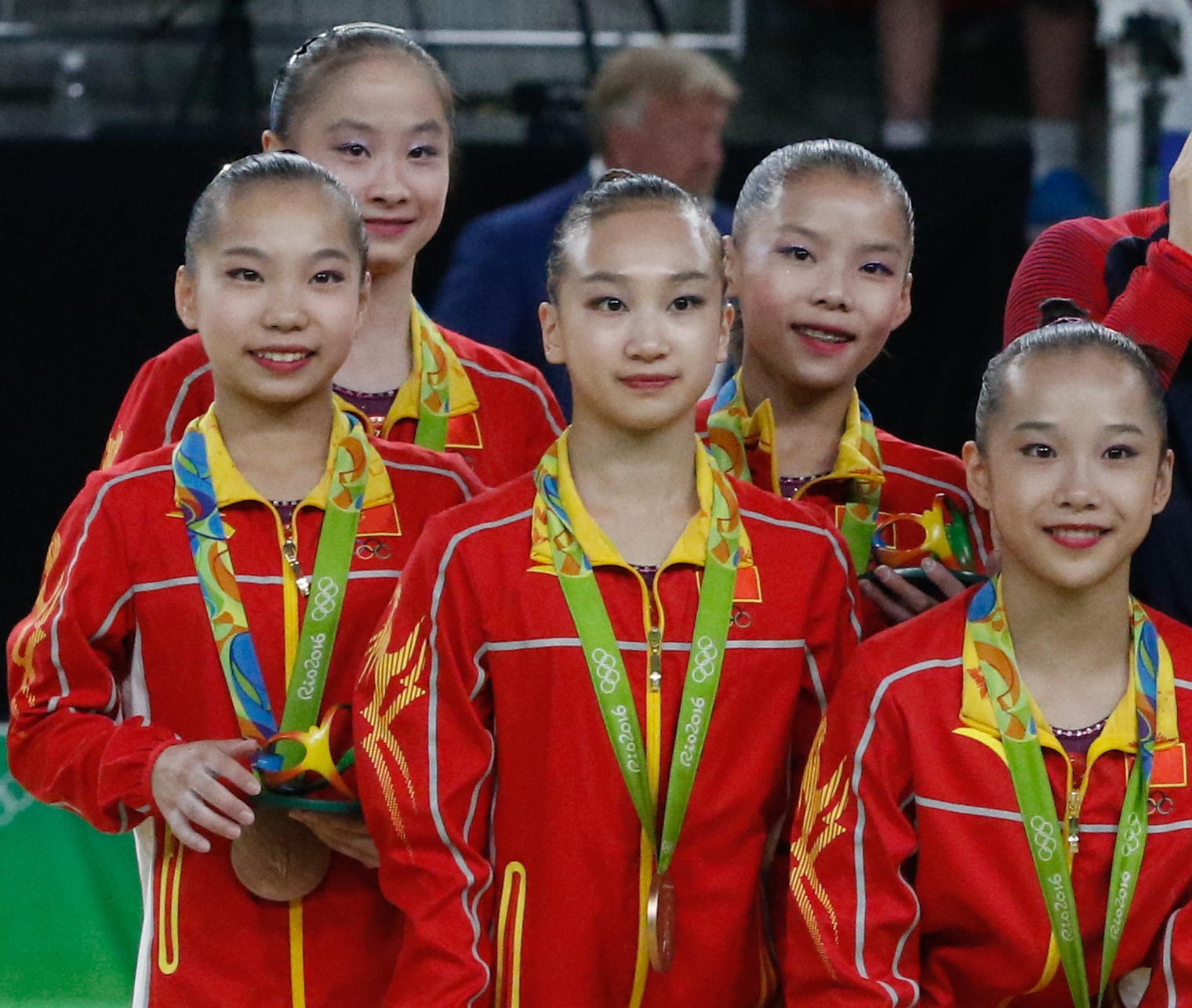
- Full name: 王妍 (Wang Yan)
- Born: 30 October 1999 (age 26) Beijing, China
- Height: 140 cm (4 ft 7 in)

Gymnastics career
- Discipline: Women's artistic gymnastics
- Country represented: China; (2013–16 (CHN))
- Head coaches: 王群策 (Wang Qunce), 徐惊雷 (Xu Jinglei)
- Music: Run Boy Run by Woodkid
Medal record
Representing China
Olympic Games
Bronze medal – third place	2016 Rio de Janeiro	Team
World Championships
Silver medal – second place	2015 Glasgow	Team
Asian Championships
Gold medal – first place	2015 Hiroshima	Vault
Gold medal – first place	2015 Hiroshima	Floor exercise
Silver medal – second place	2015 Hiroshima	Team
Silver medal – second place	2015 Hiroshima	All-around
Bronze medal – third place	2015 Hiroshima	Balance beam
Chinese Championships
Silver medal – second place	2021 Chengdu	Team
Youth Olympic Games
Gold medal – first place	2014 Nanjing	Vault
Gold medal – first place	2014 Nanjing	Balance beam
Bronze medal – third place	2014 Nanjing	Uneven bars
National Games
Gold medal – first place	2017 Tianjin	Vault
Silver medal – second place	2017 Tianjin	Team
Gold medal – first place	2017 Tianjin	Floor Exercise
Bronze medal – third place	2017 Tianjin	All-Around

Wang Yan (Chinese: 王妍; pinyin: Wáng Yán; born 30 October 1999) is a senior elite Chinese gymnast. She won a bronze medal in the team event at the 2016 Summer Olympics.

== 2013 ==
Wang competed at the Chinese Nationals, placing fourth on balance beam, fifth with her team, and tenth in the all-around. She went on to compete at the National Games of China, placing fourth in the all-around and on vault, sixth on floor, and eighth with her team. She made her international debut at the Japan Junior International, winning silver in the all-around and on vault, bronze on beam, and placing fifth on uneven bars.

== 2014 ==
In April, she competed at the Junior Asian Championships in Tashkent, Uzbekistan, winning all-around gold, team and floor silver, and placing fourth on vault. At the Chinese Nationals in May, she won the gold medal on vault, as well as a bronze medal in the all-around and floor exercise. She placed seventh with her team. In August, she competed at the 2014 Youth Olympic Games in Nanjing. She placed fourth in the all around due to falls on the two events she qualified in first in, uneven bars and balance beam, but had strong vault and floor routines. She won a bronze on uneven bars, and golds on vault and balance beam.

Wang became a senior elite gymnast in 2015.

== 2015 ==
As a first year senior, Wang competed at the Chinese Nationals in June, qualifying first into the all-around and vault finals, in addition to the balance beam and floor finals. She was also third reserve for the uneven bars final. She earned silver in the all-around final behind Shang Chunsong.

== 2016 ==
Wang competed at the Chinese Nationals in May, qualifying third into the all-around, vault finals, and floor finals. She also qualified fourth into the balance beam finals.

She placed fourth in the all-around finals. In addition, she placed eighth in both balance beam and floor finals with major mistakes. At the conclusion of the Chinese Championships, Wang was named to the Chinese team for the 2016 Summer Olympics along with Shang Chunsong, Mao Yi, Fan Yilin, and Liu Tingting (who was replaced by Tan Jiaxin later due to an injury). She proved her placement on the team with some of the most solid routines of the team. In qualifying, she qualified 6th to the all around, and also qualified for vault and floor finals, the only gymnast on the team to qualify to multiple event finals. In the team final she helped the team win a bronze medal, behind Russia and the United States who won silver and gold respectively. In the all around final, she performed well again, placing 6th. In the vault final, she placed 5th. In the floor final, she performed well placing 5th. Over the course of the Olympic Games, she did not make any major mistakes on any event.

== 2021 ==
Wang competed at the 2021 Chinese Gymnastics Championship in Chengdu. In the qualification round, she competed on vault, balance beam, and floor exercise, finishing 84th all-around. Along with teammates Du Siyu, Lin Haibin, Qi Qi, Tang Xijing, and Wang Jingying, she helped Team Beijing to reach second place in the team final, securing a silver medal.

=== Selected Competitive Skills ===
Apparatus	Name	Description	Difficulty (Note: Valid for the 2017-2020 Code of Points)	Performed
Vault	Zamolodchikova	1/4 turn entry, laid-out 2/1 twists backwards off	5.6	2016
Vault	Chusovitina	Handspring forward entry, laid-out 1 1/2 twists forward off	5.8	2016
Uneven Bars	Straddle Jaeger	Jaeger Salto straddled to hang on high bar	D	2016
Uneven Bars	Weiler Kip	Clear hip circle forward to handstand	D	2016
Uneven Bars	Double Layout	Double back flip, laid-out from high bar	D	2016
Uneven Bars	Ray	Double back flip, laid-out from high bar with 2/1 turn (720°)	G	2017
Balance Beam	Shishova	Salto backward laid-out with 360° turn, take-off from both legs	G	2015-
Balance Beam	Grigoras	Salto forward tucked with ½ turn (180°) take-off from both legs	F	2016
Floor Exercise	Silivas	Double salto backward tucked with 2/1 turn (720°)	H	2015-

== Competitive history ==
Year	Event	Team	AA	VT	UB	BB	FX
2013	National Championships	5th	10th			4th	
2013	National Games	8th	4th	4th			6th
2013	Japan Junior International		2nd	2nd	5th	3rd	
2014	Asian Championships (Junior)	2nd	1st	4th			2nd
2014	National Championships	7th	3rd	1st			3rd
2014	Youth Olympic Games		4th	1st	3rd	1st	
2015	National Championships	5th	2nd	1st		5th	1st
2015	Asian Championships	2nd	2nd	1st		3rd	1st
2016	National Championships	4th	4th	WD		8th	8th
2016	Olympic Games	3rd	6th	5th			6th
2017	National Games	2nd	3rd	1st			1st
