= Wei Xiaoyuan =

Chinese artistic gymnast

Wei Xiaoyuan 韦筱圆
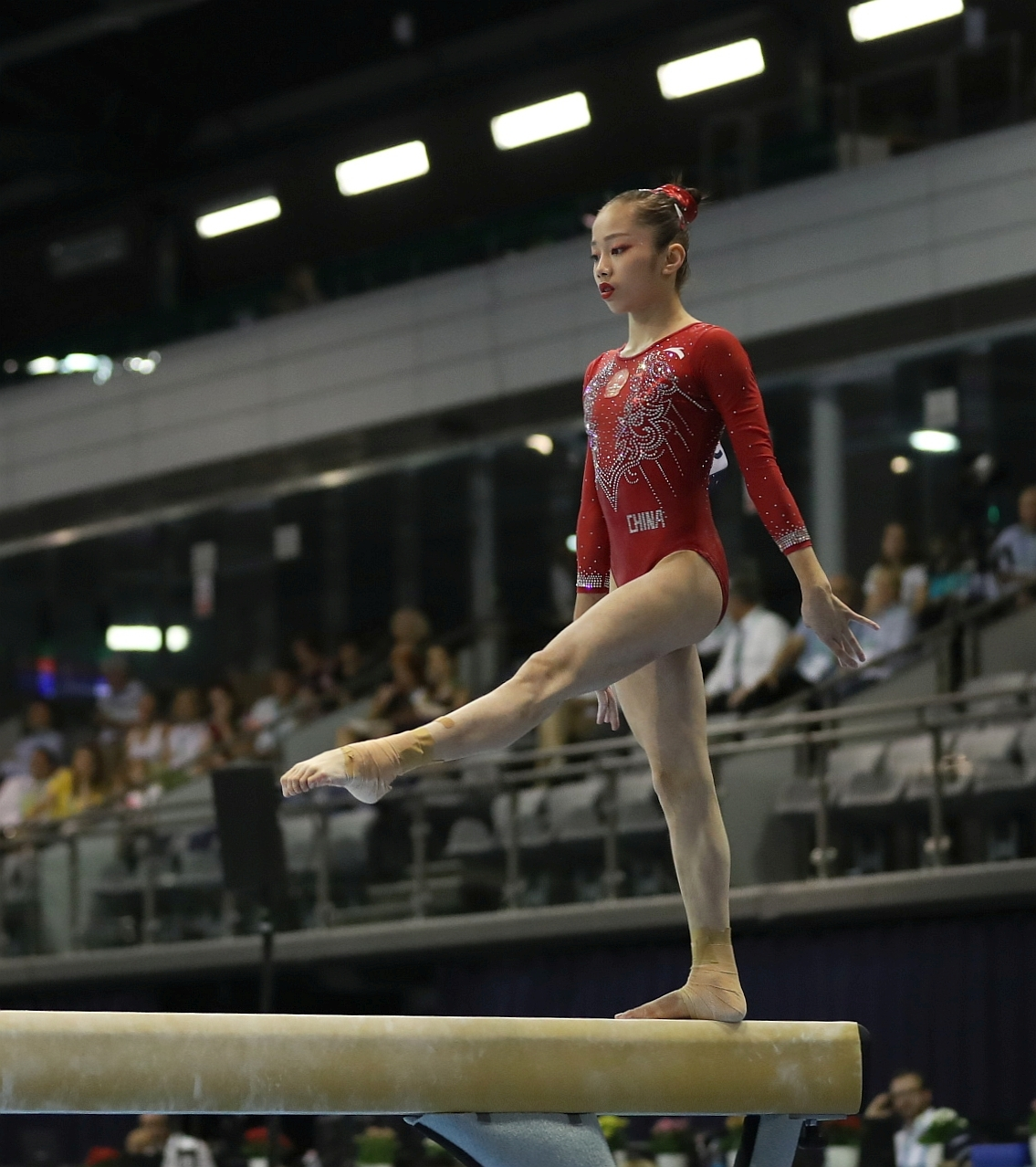
- Wei on the balance beam at the 2019 Junior World Championships

Personal information
- Born: August 25, 2004 (age 22) Guangxi, China

Gymnastics career
- Discipline: Women's artistic gymnastics
- Country represented: China; (2018–2023)
- Club: Shanxi Province, Guangxi province, He Hua's club
- Head coaches: He Hua, Wang Liming
Medal record
Women's artistic gymnastics
Representing China
World Championships
Gold medal – first place	2021 Kitakyushu	Uneven Bars
Gold medal – first place	2022 Liverpool	Uneven Bars
Asian Championships
Gold medal – first place	2022 Doha	Team
Gold medal – first place	2022 Doha	Uneven Bars
World University Games
Gold medal – first place	2021 Chengdu	Team
Junior World Championships
Silver medal – second place	2019 Györ	Team
Silver medal – second place	2019 Győr	Balance Beam
Bronze medal – third place	2019 Győr	Uneven Bars

Wei Xiaoyuan (simplified Chinese: 韦筱圆; traditional Chinese: 韋筱圓, born August 25, 2004) is a Chinese artistic gymnast. She is best known for her work on the uneven bars, where she is a two-time world champion (2021, 2022), the 2022 Asian champion, and a two-time Chinese national silver medalist (2021, 2022). In the all-around, she is the 2021 Chinese National Games champion and the 2020 Chinese national silver medalist. On the junior level, she is a three-time Junior World Championships medalist and the 2019 National Youth Games all-around champion.

== Junior gymnastics career ==
=== 2018 ===
In February Wei competed at the WOGA Classic in the United States where she placed thirteenth in the all-around but recorded the third highest score on the balance beam. In April she competed at the 2018 City of Jesolo Trophy in Italy, where she placed seventh on the balance beam and helped China place fifth in the team competition.

The following month Wei competed at the senior-level Chinese Championships representing Guangxi province. She placed fourteenth in the all-around and her team placed eleventh. In June, Wei competed at the Chinese Junior National Championships where she finished second in the 14 and under division behind Guan Chenchen. During event finals she won silver on uneven bars behind Wang Jingying, finished seventh on balance beam, and won gold on floor exercise.

=== 2019 ===
In March Wei competed at the 2019 City of Jesolo Trophy where she placed fifth in the all-around, on balance beam, and on floor exercise and placed seventh on uneven bars. In May she competed at the Chinese Championships where she placed tenth in the all-around. Wei was later selected to represent China at the inaugural Junior World Championships alongside Ou Yushan and Guan Chenchen. While there she helped China finish second in team final, behind Russia and ahead of the United States. Individually, Wei finished sixth in the all-around and won two medals in the event finals: silver on balance beam behind Elena Gerasimova and bronze on uneven bars behind Vladislava Urazova and Viktoria Listunova.

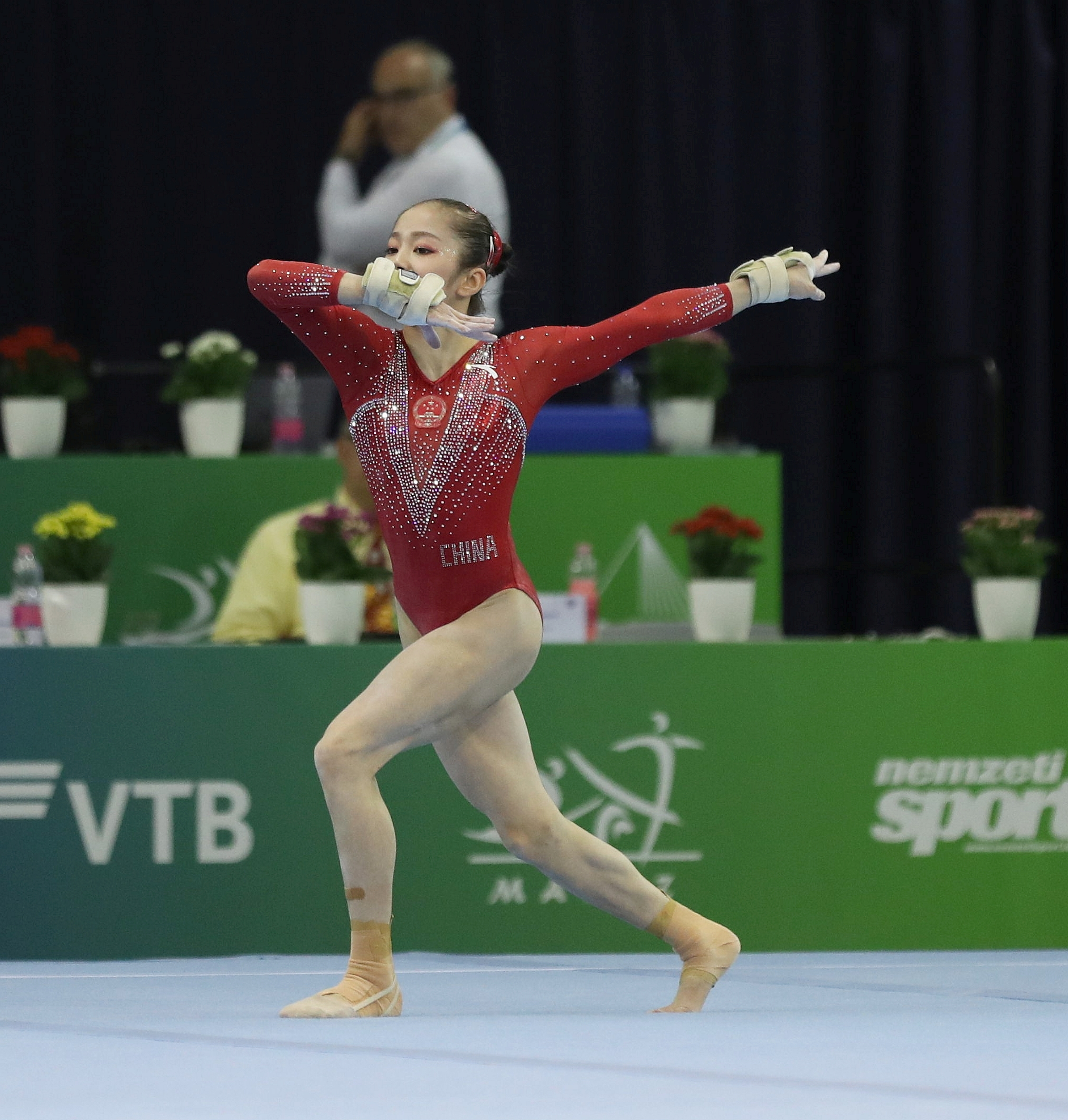
Team / All-Around Final

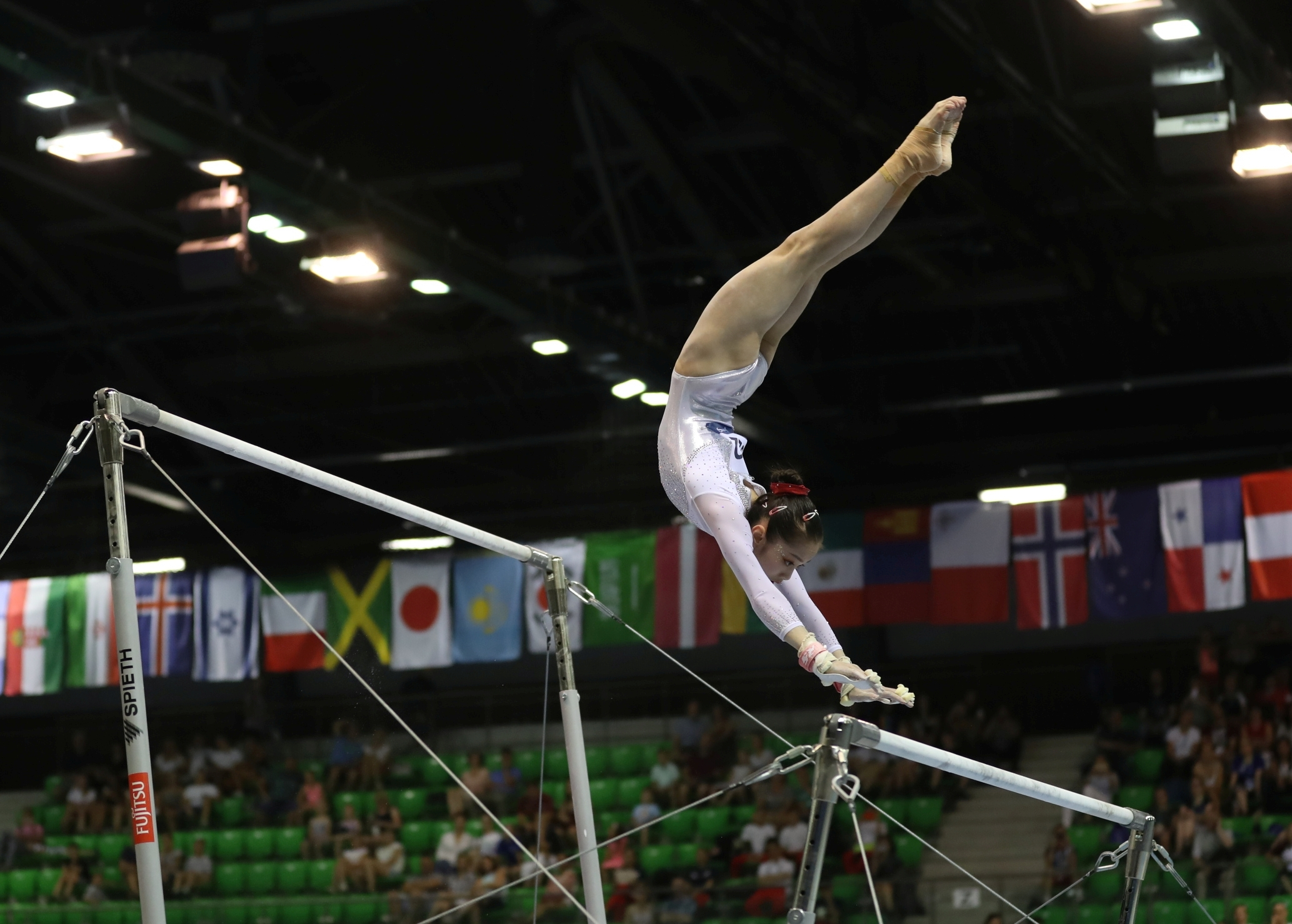
Uneven Bars Final

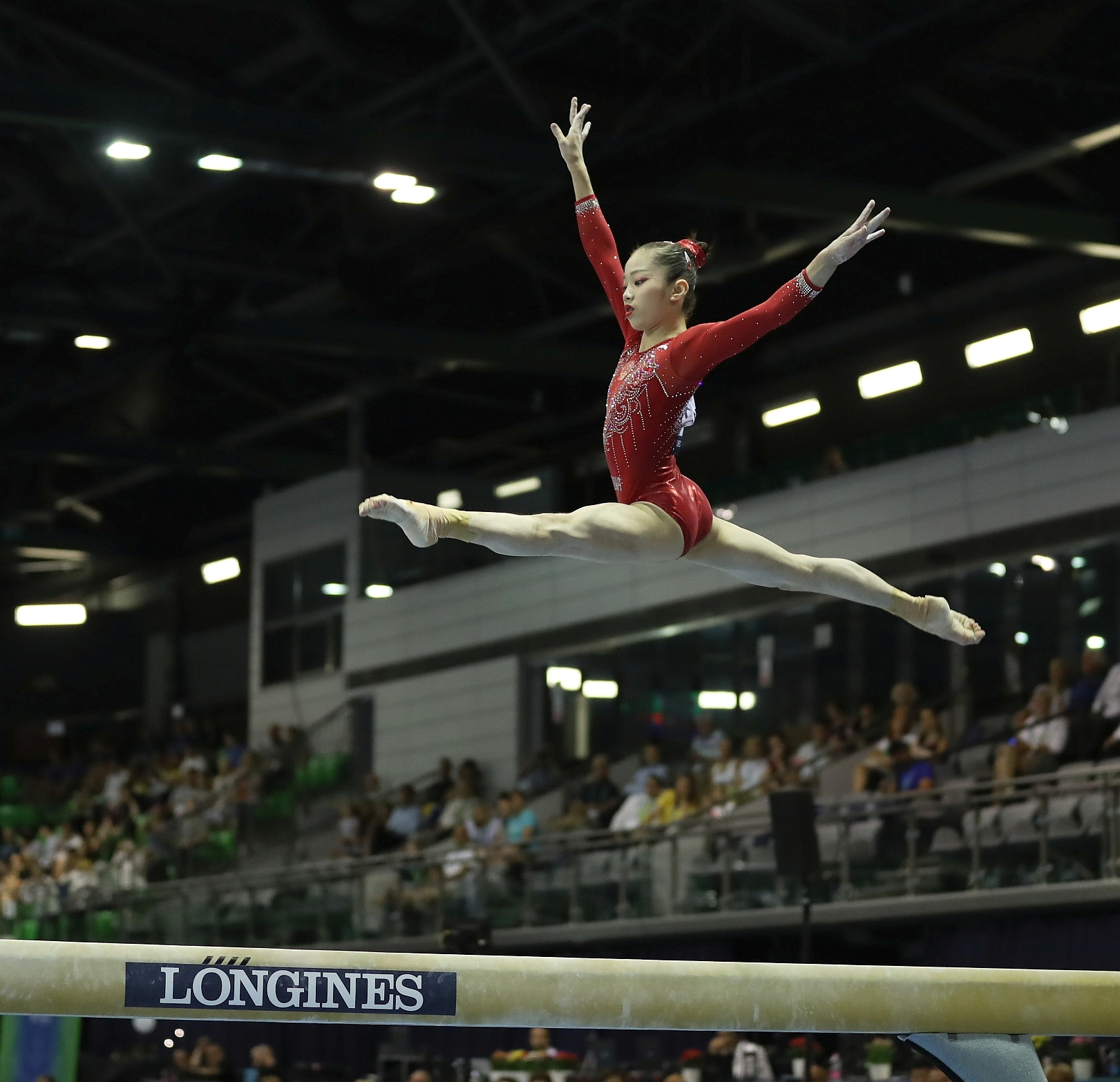
Balance Beam Final

Wei at the 2019 Junior World Championships

She finished the season competing at the National Youth Games where she won gold in the all-around and on uneven bars ahead of Ou Yushan, silver on floor exercise behind Ou, and bronze in the team final, and she finished seventh on balance beam.

== Senior gymnastics career ==
=== 2020 ===
In late January it was announced that Wei would make her senior debut at the Stuttgart World Cup taking place in March. She was replaced by Zhou Ruiyu; however the Stuttgart World Cup was later canceled due to the coronavirus pandemic in Germany.

In September, she competed at the postponed National Championships. In the qualification round, which also served as the team final, Wei debuted upgraded routines on uneven bars, balance beam, and floor exercise to qualify in third place to the all-around final behind defending champion Liu Tingting and Junior Words teammate Guan Chenchen. She also qualified in second place to the balance beam final, behind Guan and ahead of 2018 World Champion Liu, and in sixth place to the uneven bars final. Wei led the Guangxi provincial team to an eight place finish, contributing the top score on every event.

In the all-around final, Wei improved her ranking from qualifications to win the silver medal behind Liu despite a fall on her acrobatic series on beam. Wei recorded the highest uneven bars score and tied with Qi Qi for the highest all-around score of the day but remained behind Liu in the combined two-day total. Wei expressed satisfaction with her performance despite the fall on beam and said she hoped to learn the double-twisting Yurchenko (DTY) vault to improve her chances of making the Chinese team for the postponed 2020 Summer Olympics. Wei repeated her placements from qualifications in the event finals, placing sixth on uneven bars and winning silver on beam behind Guan.

=== 2021 ===
Wei was selected to be an alternate at the 2020 Olympic Games alongside Luo Rui, He Licheng, Liu Tingting and Qi Qi.

She competed at the National Games held in September, representing team Guangxi. Her provincial team did not make the team finals but Wei contributed the highest score on all 4 events. She then qualified for AA finals in 2nd place behind Ou Yushan, Uneven bars final in 2nd behind Fan Yilin and Floor finals in 3rd. Wei won All-around gold by less than 0.100 points ahead of Ou Yushan and Luo Rui. She also received a bronze medal on uneven bars behind 2-time world champion Fan Yilin and Olympian Lu Yufei. Due to a fall on her first tumbling pass and on the double wolf turn, she placed 8th on event finals for floor.

Wei then competed at the 2021 World Championships, she had a fall on the korbut flip on beam and the 2nd pass on floor but qualified for All-around finals in 7th and Uneven bars final in 2nd, behind Brazil's Rebeca Andrade. In the all-around finals, she finished 6th in all-around despite a fall on her uneven bars and a repeated element on floor. On event finals, she bounced back from her previous mistakes and won gold on Uneven bars with a score of 14.733.

=== 2022 ===
Wei competed at the 2022 Asian Championships in June. While there she helped China place first as a team, with the highest uneven bars score of the meet of 15.000. Individually she won gold on the uneven bars with a score of 14.767.

Wei next competed at the Chinese National Championships held in Huanglong, Zhejiang. She qualified to both the all-around and uneven bars finals. Additionally she helped her team, Guangxi province, to achieve a fourth place finish. In the all-around final Wei improved significantly and scored the third highest score of the night. After combining scores of both qualifications and finals, Wei settled for fifth place in the all-around. In the uneven bars final Wei successfully competed her 6.6 difficulty level routine and received the silver medal after losing a tiebreak to fellow 2021 Worlds medalist Luo Rui with a score of 14.966.

Wei was selected to compete at the World Championships where she helped China qualify to the team final and individually she qualified to the uneven bars final. During the team final Wei put up the highest uneven bars score of the day helping China finish sixth. During the uneven bars final Wei scored a 14.966 to win the gold and successfully defended her title.

=== 2023 ===
Wei competed at the postponed 2021 World University Games alongside Ou Yushan, Du Siyu, Luo Huan, and Zhang Jin; together they won team gold.

== Selected competitive skills ==
Apparatus	Name	Description	Difficulty	Performed
Vault	Yurchenko Full	Yurchenko entry, laid out salto backwards with one (1/1) twist	4.6	2020
Uneven Bars	Double Layout 1/1	Dismount: Full-twisting (1/1) double laid out salto backwards	E	2020
Uneven Bars	Healy	Forward giant with 360° turn on one arm from reverse grip to L grip	E	2020
Uneven Bars	Inbar 1/1	Inbar Stalder to full (1/1) pirouette	E	2020
Uneven Bars	Komova II	Inbar Shaposhnikova transition to high bar	E	2020
Uneven Bars	Piked Jaeger	Reverse grip swing to piked salto forwards to catch high bar	E	2020
Uneven Bars	Van Leeuwen	Toe-On Shaposhnikova transition with ½ twist to high bar	E	2020
Balance Beam	Switch Ring	Switch leap to ring position (180° split with raised back leg)	E	2020
Balance Beam	Triple Twist	Dismount: laid out salto backwards with triple (3/1) twist	F	2020
Floor Exercise	Triple Twist	Laid out salto backwards with triple (3/1) twist	E	2020

== Competitive history ==
Competitive history of Wei Xiaoyuan at the junior level
Year	Event	Team	AA	VT	UB	BB	FX
2018	WOGA Classic		13				
2018	City of Jesolo Trophy	5				7	
2018	National Championships		14				
2018	Junior National Championships		2nd place, silver medalist(s)		2nd place, silver medalist(s)	7	1st place, gold medalist(s)
2019	City of Jesolo Trophy		5		7	5	5
2019	National Championships		10				
2019	Junior World Championships	2nd place, silver medalist(s)	6		3rd place, bronze medalist(s)	2nd place, silver medalist(s)	
2019	National Youth Games	3rd place, bronze medalist(s)	1st place, gold medalist(s)		1st place, gold medalist(s)	7	2nd place, silver medalist(s)

Competitive history of Wei Xiaoyuan at the senior level
Year	Event	Team	AA	VT	UB	BB	FX
2020	National Championships	8	2nd place, silver medalist(s)		6	2nd place, silver medalist(s)	
2020	Individual National Championships		2nd place, silver medalist(s)		1st place, gold medalist(s)	2nd place, silver medalist(s)	4
2021	National Championships	10	7		2nd place, silver medalist(s)		
2021	National Games		1st place, gold medalist(s)		3rd place, bronze medalist(s)		8
2021	World Championships		6		1st place, gold medalist(s)		
2022
2022	Asian Championships	1st place, gold medalist(s)			1st place, gold medalist(s)		
2022	National Championships	4	5		2nd place, silver medalist(s)		
2022	World Championships	6			1st place, gold medalist(s)		
2023	World University Games	1st place, gold medalist(s)					
