= Guan Chenchen =

Chinese artistic gymnast

- 管晨辰
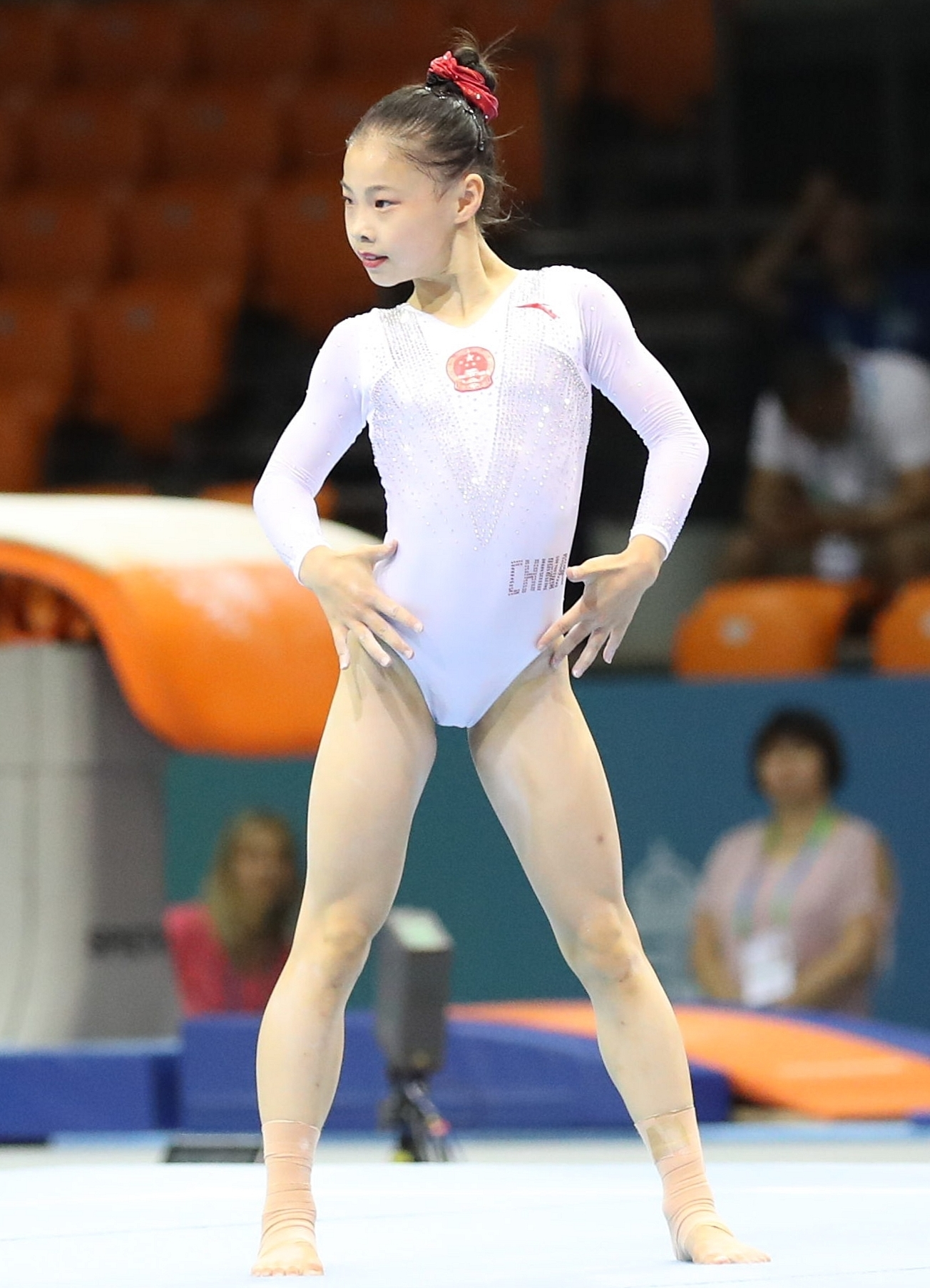
- Guan at the 2019 Junior World Championships

Personal information
- Nickname: Guan Xiaopang
- Born: September 25, 2004 (age 22) Jingzhou, Hubei, China

Gymnastics career
- Discipline: Women's artistic gymnastics
- Country represented: China; (2018–2021)
- Club: Zhejiang Province
- Head coach: Wang Qunce
- Retired: October 28, 2022
Medal record
Women's artistic gymnastics
Representing China
Olympic Games
Gold medal – first place	2020 Tokyo	Balance beam
Junior World Championships
Silver medal – second place	2019 Győr	Team

Guan Chenchen (Chinese: 管晨辰; pinyin: Guǎn Chén Chén; born September 25, 2004) is a Chinese former artistic gymnast. She is the 2020 Olympic champion and the 2020 Chinese champion on the balance beam. On the junior level, she was a member of the Chinese team who won silver at the 2019 Junior World Championships.

== Junior gymnastics career ==
Guan began gymnastics in November 2010.

=== 2017 ===
Guan competed at the Chinese Junior National Championships where she finished third amongst the 2003–04 born gymnasts and won the silver medal on the uneven bars.

=== 2018 ===
Guan competed at the senior-level Chinese Championships and tied for the silver medal on the balance beam with Chen Yile. She also won a bronze medal with the Zhejiang team and placed seventh in the all-around and floor exercise. Then in June, she competed at the Chinese Junior National Championships where she won the all-around gold medal in the 14 and under division. During the event finals, she placed fourth on the uneven bars, won gold on the balance beam, and won silver on the floor exercise behind Wei Xiaoyuan.

=== 2019 ===
Guan made her international debut at the City of Jesolo Trophy where she placed ninth in the all-around and sixth on the vault and floor exercise. In May, she competed at the Chinese Championships where she placed eighth in the all-around and won a bronze medal with the Zhejiang team. She was then selected to represent China at the inaugural Junior World Championships alongside Ou Yushan and Wei Xiaoyuan. The team won the silver medal, behind Russia and ahead of the United States. Individually, Guan finished sixth in the vault final. She finished the season competing at the Chinese National Youth Games where she finished fourth in the all-around, first on vault, sixth on uneven bars, and second on balance beam behind Ou Yushan.

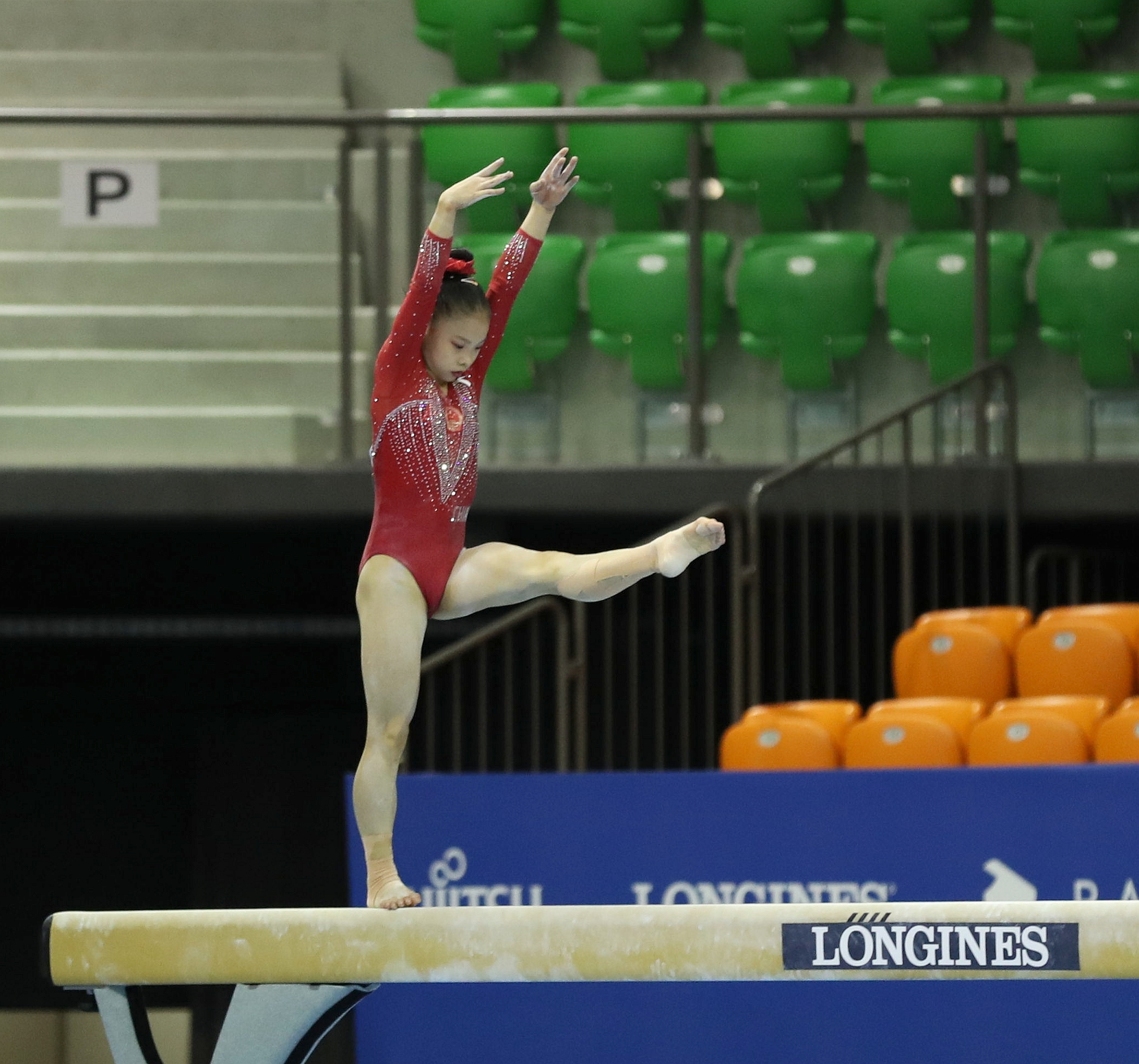
Team / All-Around Final

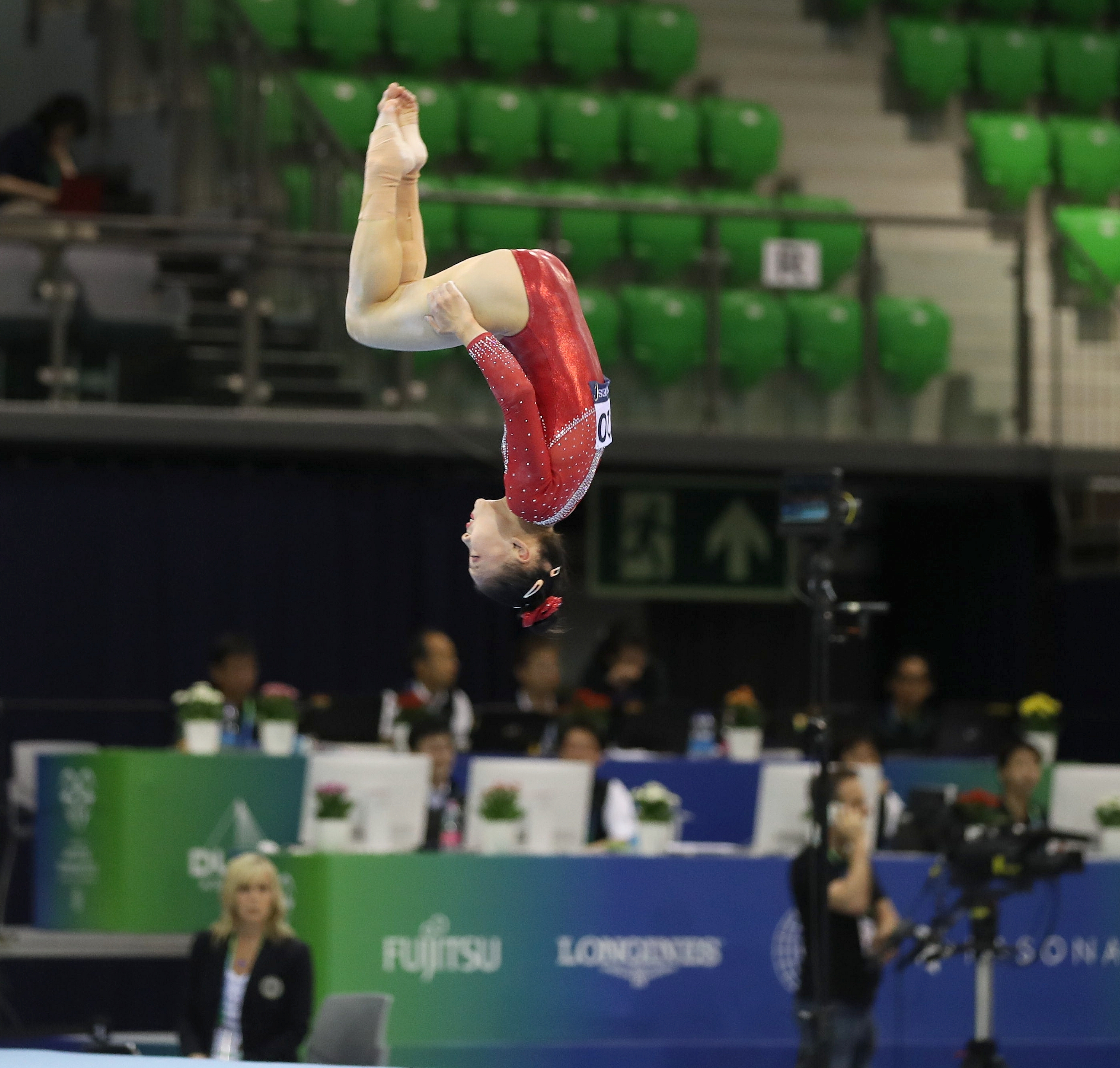
Team / All-Around Final

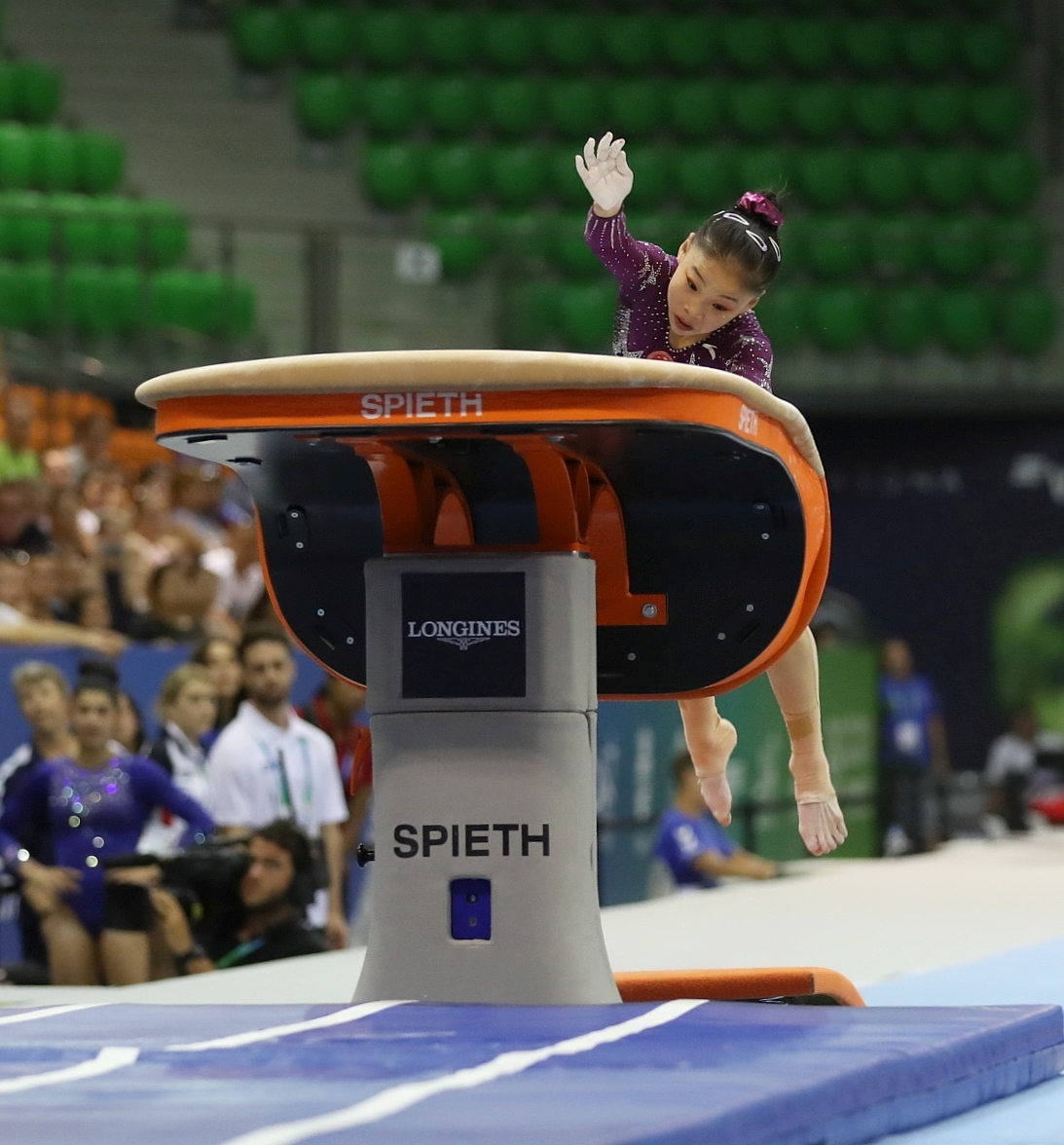
Vault Final

Guan at the 2019 Junior World Championships

== Senior gymnastics career ==
=== 2020 ===
In September, Guan made her senior debut at the Chinese Championships representing the Zhejiang provincial team. She led the team to win bronze in the team competition and individually qualified for the all-around final in second place behind reigning national champion Liu Tingting with a score of 55.900. She also qualified in first place for the balance beam final by a wide margin over reigning Junior World silver medalist Wei Xiaoyuan and reigning World silver medalist Liu. Her credited difficulty score of 7.0 was the highest of the 2017-2020 quad to that point. During the all-around final, she made multiple mistakes on the uneven bars, balance beam, and floor exercise and ended the competition in sixth place. During the balance beam final, she won the gold medal ahead of Wei and Liu with a score of 14.933, and she placed eighth in the floor exercise final.

=== 2021 ===
Guan began the season at the Chinese Championships where she won a bronze medal with the Zhejiang team. Individually, she placed ninth in the all-around final and sixth in the balance beam final. In June, she competed at the 1st Chinese Olympic Trials and won the silver medal on the balance beam behind Ou Yushan with a score of 15.133. Then at the 2nd Chinese Olympic Trials, she won the gold medal on the balance beam with a score of 15.366. She was then selected to represent China at the 2020 Summer Olympics for one of China's two individual spots.

At the Olympic Games, Guan only competed on the balance beam during qualifications and qualified first into the final with a score of 14.933. On August 3, Guan competed in the balance beam final as the youngest competitor and won the gold medal with a total score of 14.633 ahead of teammate Tang Xijing and American Simone Biles. She became the third Chinese gymnast to win the Olympic gold medal on the balance beam after Liu Xuan in 2000 and Deng Linlin in 2012.

After the Olympics, Guan competed at the Chinese National Games but fell in the balance beam final and placed fifth with a score of 13.920.

=== 2022 ===
In October 2022, a representative of the Chinese Gymnastics Federation revealed that Guan had retired from gymnastics to focus on her studies at Zhejiang University.

== Competitive history ==
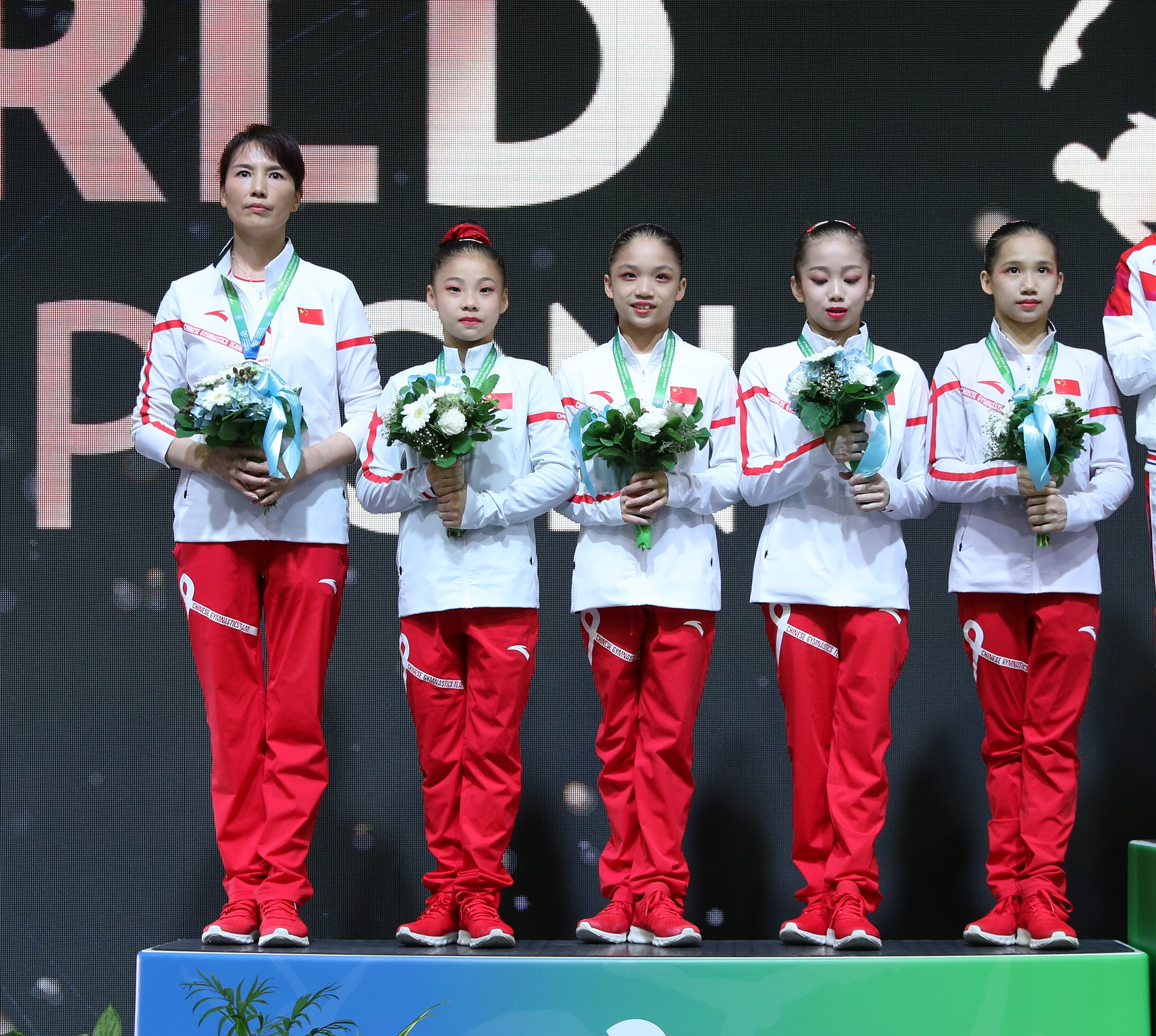
Guan (second from the left) at the 2019 Junior World Championships

Year	Event	Team	AA	VT	UB	BB	FX
Junior
2017	Junior Chinese Championships		3rd place, bronze medalist(s)		2nd place, silver medalist(s)		
2018	Chinese Championships	3rd place, bronze medalist(s)	7			2nd place, silver medalist(s)	3rd place, bronze medalist(s)
2018	Junior Chinese Championships		1st place, gold medalist(s)		4	1st place, gold medalist(s)	2nd place, silver medalist(s)
2019	City of Jesolo Trophy		9	6			6
2019	Chinese Championships	3rd place, bronze medalist(s)	8				
2019	Junior World Championships	2nd place, silver medalist(s)		6			
2019	National Youth Games	2nd place, silver medalist(s)	4	1st place, gold medalist(s)	6	2nd place, silver medalist(s)	
Senior
2020	Chinese Championships	3rd place, bronze medalist(s)	6			1st place, gold medalist(s)	8
2021	Chinese Championships	3rd place, bronze medalist(s)	9			6	
2021	Olympic Games					1st place, gold medalist(s)	
2021	National Games	4				5	
