= Zhang Yufei =

Zhang Yufei may refer to:

- Zhang Yufei (gymnast) (张育菲, born 1988), Chinese gymnast
- Zhang Yufei (swimmer) (张雨霏, born 1998), Chinese swimmer
