= 2019 Chinese Artistic Gymnastics Championships =

- Location: (China) Zhaoqing, Guangdong
- Start date: May 8, 2019
- End date: May 13, 2019

The 2019 Chinese Artistic Gymnastics Championships were held from 8 May to 13 May 2019, in Zhaoqing, Guangdong.

== Women's Medalists ==
Event	Gold	Silver	Bronze
Team	Guangdong; Liu Jingxing; Liu Tingting; Luo Rui; Ou Yushan; Zhao Shiting	Beijing; Du Siyu; Li Yanan; Qi Qi; Tang Xijing; Wang Yan	Zhejiang; Chen Yanfei; Guan Chenchen; Jia Fangfang; Luo Huan; Meng Shangrong; Sheng Jingyi
Individual all-around	Liu Tingting (Guangdong)	Luo Huan (Zhejiang)	Ou Yushan (Guangdong)
Vault	Liu Jinru (Henan)	Qi Qi (Beijing)	Deng Yalan (Jiangxi)
Uneven Bars	Liu Tingting (Guangdong)	Cheng Shiyi (Fujian)	Ou Yushan (Guangdong)
Balance Beam	Ou Yushan (Guangdong)	Tang Xijing (Beijing)	Qi Qi (Beijing)
Floor Exercise	Shang Chunsong (Hubei)	Ou Yushan (Guangdong)	Liu Tingting (Guangdong)

== Men's Medalists ==
Event	Gold	Silver	Bronze
Team	Army; Xiao Ruoteng; Zou Jingyuan; Yang Jiaxing; Deng Shudi; Huang Mingqi; Hu Xuwei	Jiangsu; Tang Qi; Sun Wei; You Hao; Yin Dehang; Shi Cong; Weng Hao	Guangdong; Wu Xiaoming; Du Yixin; Ji Lianshen; Ta Yinga; He Quqin; Yao Jiahang
Individual all-around	Deng Shudi (Army)	Sun Wei (Jiangsu)	You Hao (Jiangsu)
Floor Exercise	Xiao Ruoteng (Army)	Wang Haoran (Shandong)	Zhang Junkun (Army)
Pommel Horse	Weng Hao (Jiangsu)	Xiao Ruoteng (Army)	Yao Jianshan (Shanxi)
Still Rings	Lei Peng (Shanghai)	Lan Xingyu (Guangxi)	Deng Shudi (Army)
Vault	Cen Yu (Yunnan)	Huang Mingqi (Army)	Qu Ruiyang (Hunan)
Parallel Bars	Zou Jingyuan (Army)	Liu Rongbing (Guizhou)	Sun Wei (Jiangsu)
Horizontal Bar	Lin Chaopan (Fujian)	Liu Rongbing (Guizhou)	Zeng Jiajun (Zhejiang)
