= Zhang Yufei (gymnast) =

Chinese gymnast

- Born: 1988 (age 37–38) Dalian, Liaoning, China

Gymnastics career
- Country represented: China
- Retired: 2006
Medal record
Pacific Rim Championships
Silver medal – second place	2004 Honolulu	Uneven Bars
Silver medal – second place	2004 Honolulu	Balance Beam
Bronze medal – third place	2004 Honolulu	Team
East Asian Games
Gold medal – first place	2005 Macau	Team
National Games
Gold medal – first place	2005 Nanjing	Team
Gold medal – first place	2005 Nanjing	Uneven Bars
Bronze medal – third place	2005 Nanjing	Balance Beam

Zhang Yufei (Chinese: 张育菲; pinyin: Zhāng Yùfēi; born 1988 in Dalian, Liaoning) is a Chinese gymnast. She was known for performing at a high technical level, but was held back in her career by repeated injuries. She is one of only a handful of female gymnasts to attempt and successfully complete the 'Mo Salto'.

== Post competition career ==
Zhang Yufei moved to San Diego, CA, in August 2009. She worked as a gymnastics coach for North County Gymnastics and is now a coach with SD United Training Center, San Diego California.
