= Chinese Junior Artistic Gymnastics Championships =

Annual gymnastics competition in China

The Chinese Junior Artistic Gymnastics Championships (simplified Chinese: 全国青年体操比赛; traditional Chinese: 全國青年體操比賽) is an annual gymnastics competition among the different provinces in China.

It is the nation's highest-level gymnastics tournament for youth.

The 2012 Chinese Junior Artistic Gymnastics Championships were held from 22 June to 27 June 2012 in Hangzhou. The 2024 event took place at the Dong'an Lake Sports Park Multifunctional Gymnasium in Dong'an Lake Sports Park. During the 2025 event held at the Chuzhou Olympic Sports Centre Stadium, there were over 240 contestants from 20 provinces and cities.

== Women's Event Medal Winners ==
=== 1997-1998 ===
Event	Gold	Silver	Bronze
Team	Zhejiang	Guangdong	Hong Kong
All Around	Zhu Siyan	Feng Yuefei	Xie Wenwei; Xie Yufen
Vault	Wang Wei	Zhu Siyan	Ng Yanyin
Uneven Bars	Zhu Siyan	Chen Li	Xie Wenwei
Balance Beam	Xu Li	Wang Wei	Xu Yue
Floor	Zhu Siyan	Xu Li	Feng Yuefei

=== 1999-2000 ===
Event	Gold	Silver	Bronze
Team	Zhejiang	Jiangsu	Hubei
All Around	Yuan Xiaoyang	Lv Jiaqi	Chen Yongdie
Vault	Yuan Xiaoyang	Liu Jinru	Wang Chuqiao
Uneven Bars	Fan Yilin	Luo Huan	Lv Jiaqi
Balance Beam	Lv Jiaqi	Chen Yongdie	Zhang Wenxin
Floor	Liu Ying	Yuan Xiaoyang	Qin Chang
