= Ou Yushan =

Chinese artistic gymnast (born 2004)

Ou Yushan 欧钰珊
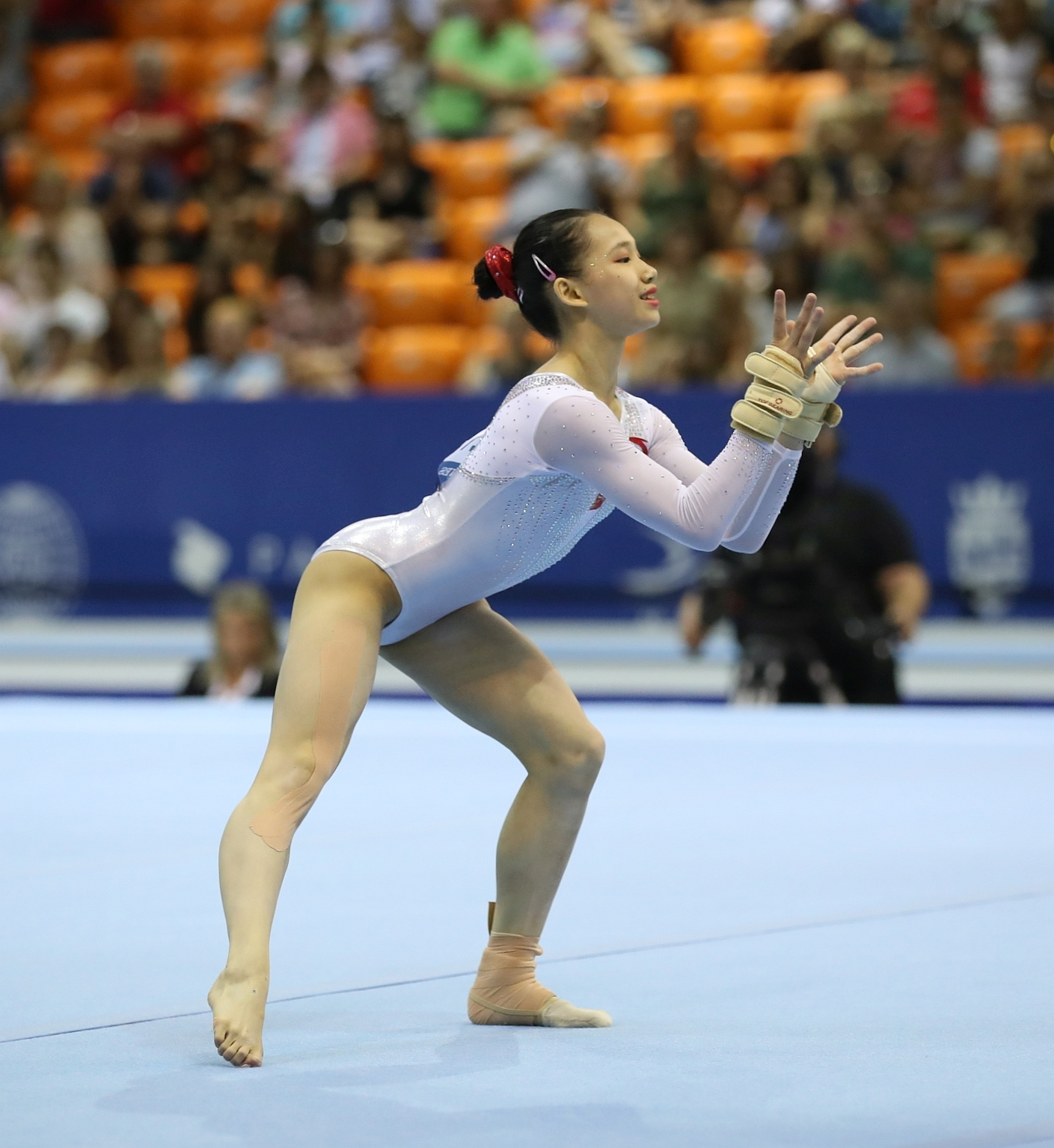
- Ou at the 2019 Junior World Championships

Personal information
- Born: January 13, 2004 (age 22) Guangxi, China

Gymnastics career
- Discipline: Women's artistic gymnastics
- Country represented: China; (2018–present)
- Club: Guangdong Province
- Head coach: Xu Jinglei
Medal record
| Event | 1st | 2nd | 3rd |
|---|---|---|---|
| World University Games | 4 | 0 | 0 |
| Junior World Championships | 0 | 2 | 1 |
| Total | 4 | 2 | 1 |
Women's artistic gymnastics
Representing China
World University Games
| Gold medal – first place | 2021 Chengdu | Team |
| Gold medal – first place | 2021 Chengdu | All-around |
| Gold medal – first place | 2021 Chengdu | Balance beam |
| Gold medal – first place | 2021 Chengdu | Floor exercise |
Junior World Championships
| Silver medal – second place | 2019 Györ | Team |
| Silver medal – second place | 2019 Győr | Floor exercise |
| Bronze medal – third place | 2019 Győr | All-around |
World Cup
| Event | 1st | 2nd | 3rd |
|---|---|---|---|
| FIG World Cup | 0 | 1 | 0 |

Ou Yushan (simplified Chinese: 欧钰珊; traditional Chinese: 歐鈺珊, born January 13, 2004, in Guangxi, China) is a Chinese artistic gymnast. She is the 2021 Summer World University Games all-around champion, balance beam champion, floor exercise champion, and team champion as part of the Chinese women's team. Ou is also the 2019 Junior World all-around bronze medalist and team and floor exercise silver medalist. She represented China at the 2020 Summer Olympics and was selected to participate in the 2024 Summer Olympics, joining the exclusive list of Chinese women's artistic gymnasts who have competed in two Olympic Games.

== Junior career ==
=== 2018 ===
Ou debuted at the senior-level Chinese National Championships, helping the Guangdong team to the gold medals in the women's team and mixed team competitions.

=== 2019 ===
Ou again represented Guangdong province at the Chinese National Championships. In the all-around, a fall on the uneven bars sunk her chances for the all-around gold, pushing her down to fourth place at that point, but after performing well on the balance beam she finished with a bronze medal. She also won three more individual medals: gold on the balance beam, silver on the floor exercise behind Shang Chunsong and bronze on the uneven bars behind Liu Tingting and Cheng Shiyi. Additionally, Ou and Liu led the Guandong province to win another gold in the provincial team final.

In June, Ou was selected to represent China at the inaugural Junior World Championships alongside Wei Xiaoyuan and Guan Chenchen. While there, she helped China finish second in the team final, behind Russia and ahead of the United States. Individually, Ou finished third in the all-around behind Russians Viktoria Listunova and Vladislava Urazova and won silver on floor exercise once again behind Listunova. She also placed fifth on uneven bars and eighth on balance beam after a fall.

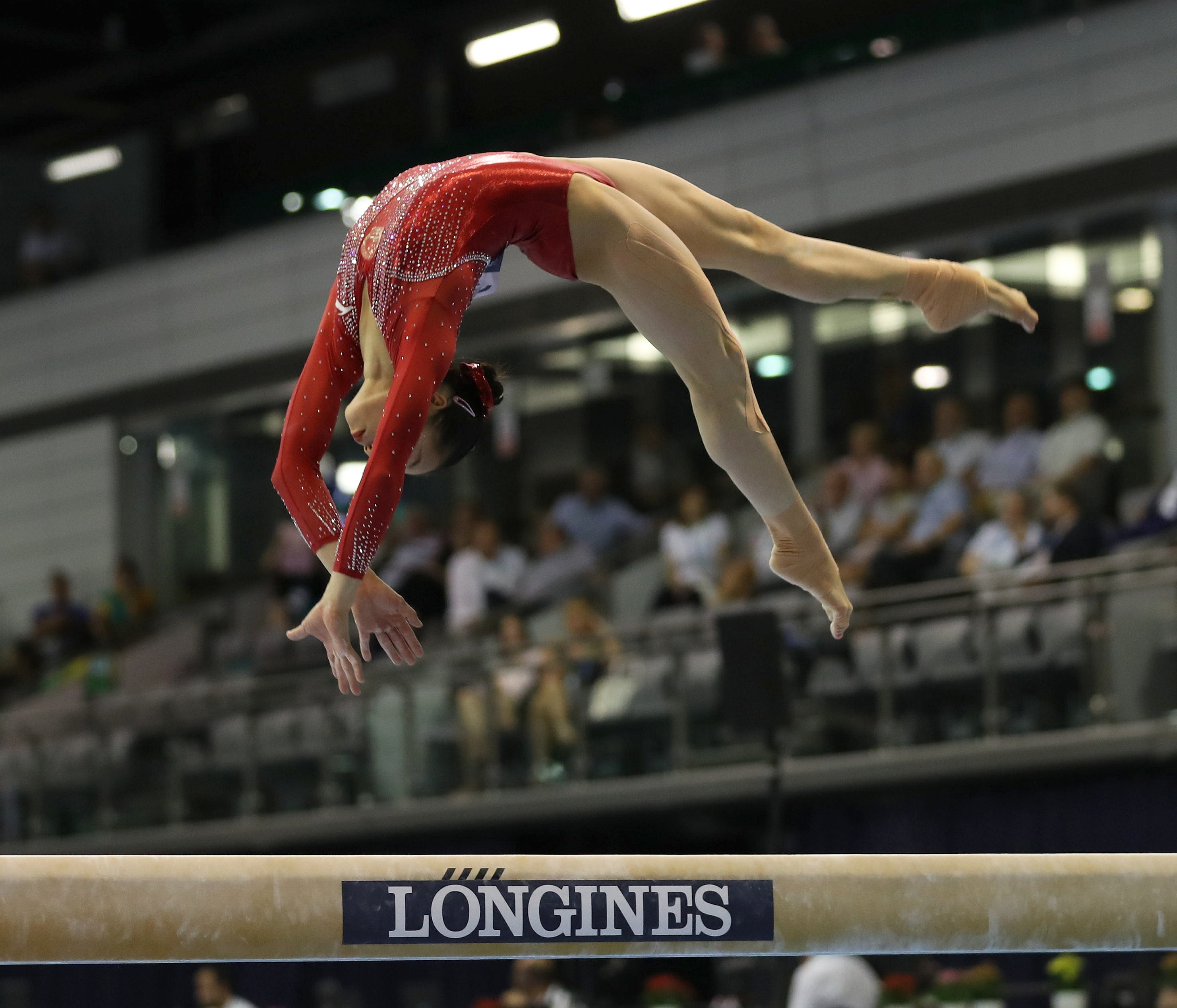
Team / All-Around Final

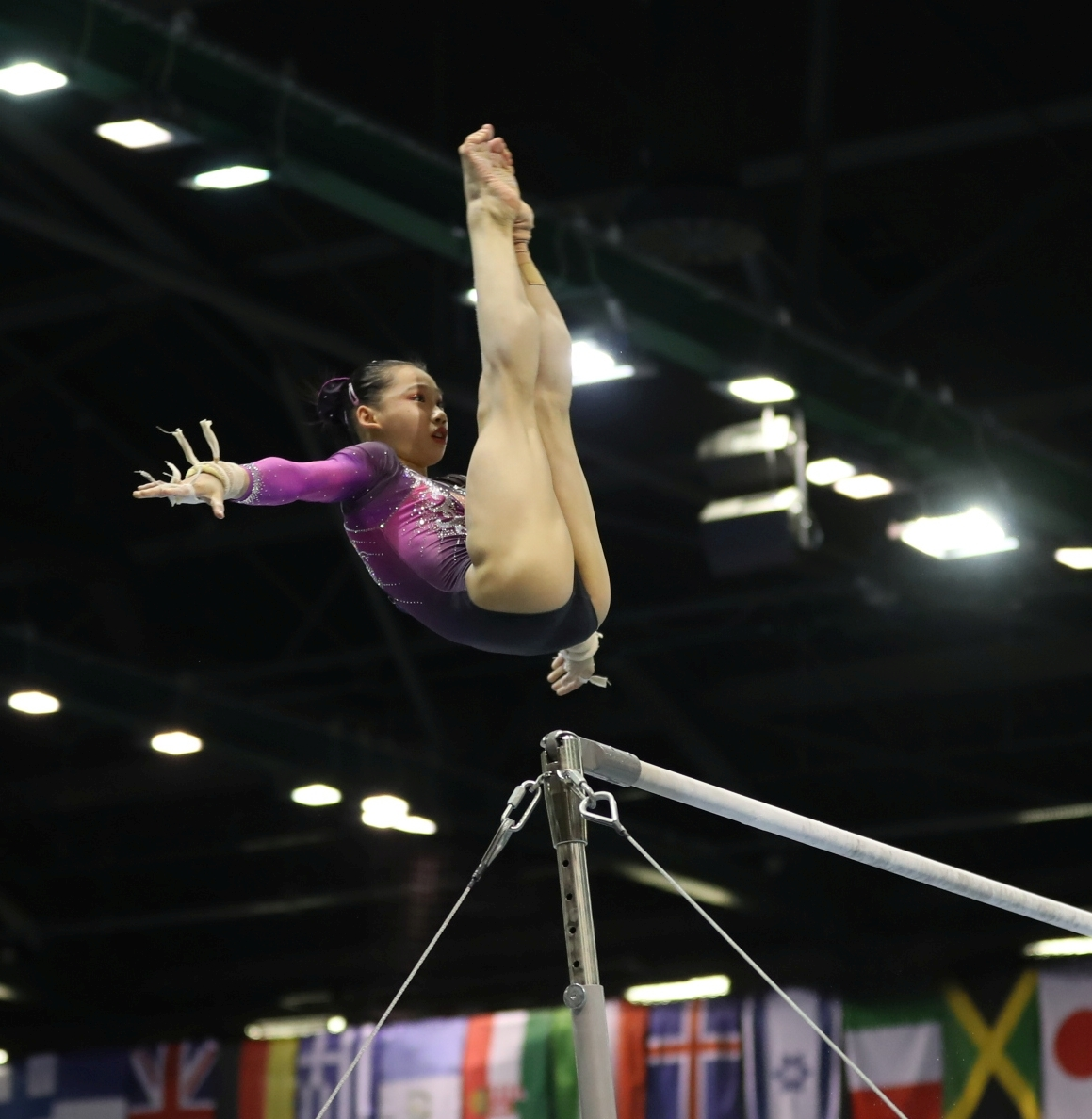
Uneven Bars Final

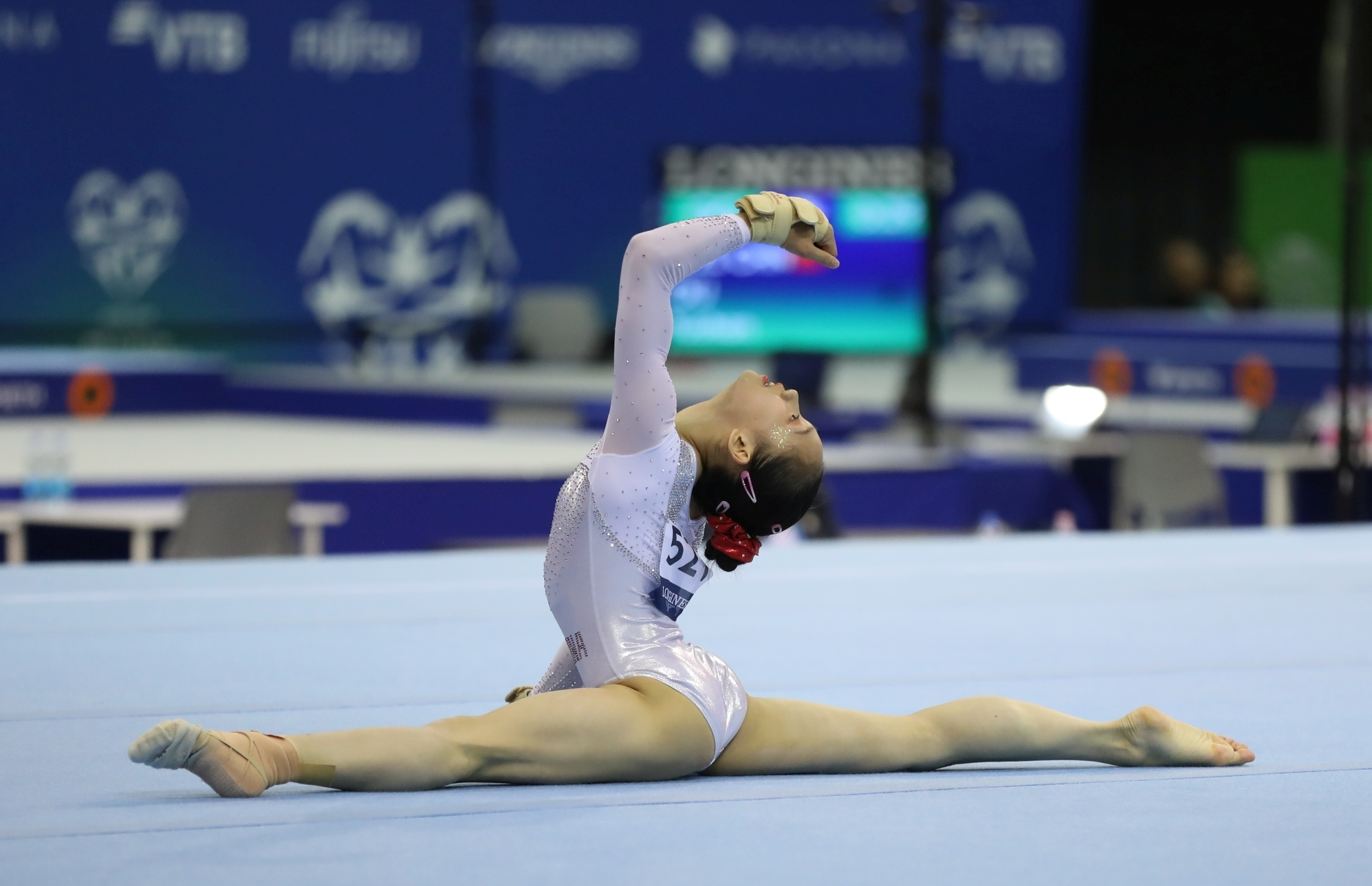
Floor Exercise Final

Ou at the 2019 Junior World Championships

She concluded her season with a strong performance at the second Chinese National Youth Games. She won three gold medals: team, balance beam, and floor exercise. She also won silver in the all-around and on uneven bars, both behind Wei Xiaoyuan, and won bronze on the vault behind Guan Chenchen and Zhang Silei.

== Senior career ==
=== 2020 ===
After the postponement of the 2020 Summer Olympics due to the COVID-19 pandemic, Ou increased expectations for her senior debut by showing upgrades on all four events at an internal test in early September. She notably attempted a balance beam routine with a start value of 7.5, which was more than a point higher than the 6.4 start value of Simone Biles' winning routine at the 2019 World Championships. She also showed a new double-twisting Yurchenko vault and stuck a new Silivas (double-twisting double tuck) on floor to win the internal test ahead of reigning World all-around silver medalist Tang Xijing. However, a knee injury forced Ou to withdraw from the Chinese National Championships a few weeks later.

=== 2021 ===
In July, Ou was selected to represent China at the 2020 Summer Olympics alongside Lu Yufei, Tang Xijing, and Zhang Jin. Due to an Achilles injury, she only competed on the vault, uneven bars, and balance beam during the qualification round where she helped the Chinese team finish third. She did not qualify for any individual finals. In the team final, Ou fell on her double-twisting Yurchenko vault and the Chinese team finished seventh. Ou later competed on the 2021 Chinese National Games, finishing first in floor exercise and team final, and second in the all-around. She underwent surgery for her elbow and her ankle injuries afterwards and returned to her provincial team to recuperate.

=== 2022 ===
At the Chinese National Championships Ou placed second in the all-around behind Tang Xijing. Additionally she placed first with her team, third on balance beam and fifth on floor exercise. In October, she competed at the World Championships in Liverpool. China placed sixth in the team final, while Ou placed seventh in the all-around and sixth on balance beam after a fall.

=== 2023 ===
At the 2023 Chinese Artistic Gymnastics Championships, Ou qualified into the all around, beam, and floor finals in 2nd, 3rd, and 1st position respectively. She placed second in the all-around final behind Qiu Qiyuan and ahead of Zhang Qingying, as well as first with her team, third on balance beam and fourth on floor exercise after making minor mistakes. In August, Ou compete at the 2021 Summer World University Games in Chengdu, China along with Wei Xiaoyuan, Du Siyu, Luo Huan, and Zhang Jin. She qualified into the all-around, beam, and floor finals in first position. Ou placed first in the all-around ahead of teammate Luo Huan and Japanese gymnast Ayaka Sakaguchi. She also placed first with the Chinese team, and in the balance beam and floor exercise finals. In October, she was selected to compete in Antwerp for the 2023 World Artistic Gymnastics Championships alongside Qiu Qiyuan, Zhang Qingying, Zhou Yaqin, Huang Zhuofan and Wu Ran. She qualified into the individual all around and team finals. Team China finished in 4th place behind the United States of America, Brazil, and France. During team finals, Ou injured her foot on her first event which led her to withdraw from the all around finals.

=== 2024 ===
Ou began her season at the Baku World Cup in Azerbaijan, winning silver on floor exercise. In June she was selected to represent 2024 Olympic Games in Paris alongside Qiu Qiyuan, Zhou Yaqin, Zhang Yihan, and Luo Huan. At the Olympics they placed sixth as a team. Individually Ou finished sixteenth in the all-around and eighth on floor exercise.

== Competitive history ==
| Year | Event | Team | AA | VT | UB | BB | FX |
Junior
| 2018 | National Championships | 1st place, gold medalist(s) | | | | | |
| 2019 | National Championships | 1st place, gold medalist(s) | 3rd place, bronze medalist(s) | | 3rd place, bronze medalist(s) | 1st place, gold medalist(s) | 2nd place, silver medalist(s) |
| 2019 | Junior World Championships | 2nd place, silver medalist(s) | 3rd place, bronze medalist(s) | | 5 | 8 | 2nd place, silver medalist(s) |
| 2019 | National Youth Games | 1st place, gold medalist(s) | 2nd place, silver medalist(s) | 3rd place, bronze medalist(s) | 2nd place, silver medalist(s) | 1st place, gold medalist(s) | 1st place, gold medalist(s) |
Senior
| 2020 | National Championships | WD | | | | | |
| 2021 | National Championships | 1st place, gold medalist(s) | 6 | | | | |
| 2021 | Olympic Games | 7 | | | | | |
| 2021 | National Games | 1st place, gold medalist(s) | 2nd place, silver medalist(s) | | | 2nd place, silver medalist(s) | 1st place, gold medalist(s) |
| 2022 | National Championships | 1st place, gold medalist(s) | 2nd place, silver medalist(s) | | | 3rd place, bronze medalist(s) | 5 |
| 2022 | World Championships | 6 | 7 | | | 6 | R3 |
| 2023 | National Championships | 1st place, gold medalist(s) | 2nd place, silver medalist(s) | | | 3rd place, bronze medalist(s) | 4 |
| 2023 | World University Games | 1st place, gold medalist(s) | 1st place, gold medalist(s) | | | 1st place, gold medalist(s) | 1st place, gold medalist(s) |
| 2023 | World Championships | 4 | WD | | | | |
| 2024 | Baku World Cup | | | | | R3 | 2nd place, silver medalist(s) |
| 2024 | Olympic Games | 6 | 16 | | | | 8 |
| 2025 | Chinese Nationals | 2nd place, silver medalist(s) | 9 | | | | 7 |
| 2025 | National Games | 2nd place, silver medalist(s) | | | | | |
