= 2013 National Games of China =

Multi-sports competition

12th National Games of the People's Republic of China
- Host city: Many in Liaoning
- Country: China
- Teams: 39
- Athletes: 9,770
- Events: 350 in 31 sports
- Opening: 31 August 2013
- Closing: 12 September 2013
- Opened by: Xi Jinping; CCP general secretary
- Closed by: Li Keqiang; Chinese premier
- Athlete's Oath: Sun Yujie
- Judge's Oath: Wong Lap
- Torch lighter: 12 children
- Main venue: Shenyang Olympic Sports Center Stadium
- Website: sport.gov.cn/n4/n235/

The 12th National Games of China were held in the northeastern province of Liaoning from 31 August to 12 September 2013. Liaoning was the sixth provincial level host of the games, following Beijing, Shanghai, Guangdong, Jiangsu and Shandong. A total of 350 events in 31 sports were held at the games.

== Host bidding ==
For the second time in the games' history, the selection of the host province/municipality in 2013 was made on the basis of bidding process (similar to the process undertaken to select the Olympic Games host city). The sports secretaries and officials from every province, municipality and autonomous region cast their votes in a secret ballot. The winning entry must receive a majority of the votes cast.

In the 12th National Games bidding process, Liaoning, Tianjin, Zhejiang and Hubei were the candidates. Each committee made a 20-minute presentation to the officials. In the first round of voting, Hubei with the lowest number of votes at 2 was eliminated while Liaoning received the highest at 38. In the second and final round, Liaoning won in a landslide victory with 43 votes with Tianjin and Zhejiang at 24 and 11 votes, respectively.

The Lioaning organisers settled on a blue and white harbor seal called Ningning (Chinese: 宁宁) as the official mascot for the games. The harbor seal is a frequent sight in Liaodong Bay as it is the country's only nature reserve for the animals.

== Venues ==
A total of 117 facilities were involved in the games, 25 of which were purpose built to host the games. Among them 64 were competition venues and 53 were for training. There was an emphasis on using pre-existing venues for the games and some of the newly developed venues were earmarked for public usage after the competitions. Unlike many other multi-sport events, which typically focus around a host city, the 12th Chinese Games held events in many cities within the host province, Liaoning. Shenyang contained the principal venue, the Shenyang Olympic Sports Center Stadium, where the opening and closing ceremonies were held. Other cities involved in the games were Anshan, Benxi, Chaoyang, Dalian, Dandong, Fushun, Huludao, Jinzhou, Liaoyang, Panjin, Tieling and Yingkou.

- Shenyang Olympic Sports Center Stadium (athletics, opening and closing ceremonies)
- Dalian Municipal swimming pool (fencing, modern pentathlon, swimming)
- Anshan Olympic stadium (men's football, table tennis)
- Anshan Olympic swimming pool (water polo)
- Anshan Olympic oval (handball)
- Waters near Fushun City People's Square (open water swimming)
- Benxi City Stadium (women's basketball)
- Benxi City Highway (road cycling)
- Dandong City Sports Center Stadium (women's basketball)
- Jinzhou Marina Sports Center Stadium (badminton)
- Jinzhou International Convention and Exhibition Center Gymnasium (boxing)
- Near Shanhai Square, Yingkou (beach volleyball)
- Yingkou Olympic Stadium (men's basketball)
- Yingkou (marathon)
- Fuxin City Stadium (basketball)
- Liaoyang City Stadium (wushu, sanshou)
- Tieling Normal University Gymnasium (volleyball)
- Chaoyang City Stadium (volleyball)
- Panjin City Olympic Stadium (women's football, volleyball)
- Huludao Olympic Stadium (trampoline gymnastics)

== Games ==
=== Pre-games events ===
Although the opening ceremony is scheduled for 31 August 2013, a number of events are scheduled to take place before that date.

The first medals were awarded in the racewalking events, which are part of the athletics programme and were held on 10, 11 and 12 May. Wu Qianlong won the men's 50 kilometres walk and Wang Zhen won the men's 20 kilometre walk. A photo finish was needed for the women's 20 km walk and Lu Xiuzhi was declared the winner ahead of Liu Hong.

=== Sports ===
Key: † = New sport

- Aquatics
  - Diving
  - Swimming
  - Synchronized swimming
  - Water polo
- Archery
- Athletics
- Badminton
- Baseball
- Basketball
- Boxing
- Canoeing
- Cycling
- Equestrian
- Fencing
- Football
- Golf ^{†}
- Gymnastics
  - Artistic gymnastics
  - Rhythmic gymnastics
  - Trampoline gymnastics
- Handball
- Field hockey
- Judo
- Martial arts (Sanshou)^{†}
- Modern pentathlon
- Rowing
- Rugby union ^{†}
- Sailing
- Shooting
- Softball
- Table tennis
- Taekwondo
- Tennis
- Triathlon
- Volleyball
- Beach volleyball
- Weightlifting
- Wrestling
- Wushu

== Participation ==
A total of 9770 athletes from 39 delegations took part in the competition (fewer than both the 2005 and 2009 editions). Among the delegations were 4 municipalities, 22 provincial teams and 5 autonomous regions. Further to this, the People's Liberation Army sent a team, and six sports association teams were entered (generally associations from specific industry groupings or large organisations).

- Anhui
- Beijing
- Chongqing
- Fujian
- Gansu
- Guangdong
- Guangxi
- Guizhou
- Hainan
- Hebei
- Heilongjiang
- Henan
- Hong Kong
- Hubei
- Hunan
- Jiangsu
- Jiangxi
- Jilin
- Liaoning
- Macau
- Inner Mongolia
- Ningxia
- Qinghai
- Shaanxi
- Shandong
- Shanghai
- Shanxi
- Sichuan
- Tianjin
- Tibet
- Xinjiang
- Yunnan
- Zhejiang
- Coal China Sports Association
- Civil Defence and Police Sports Association (前卫体协)
- Finance Equestrian Sports Association (金融体协马术队)
- Locomotive Sports Association
- People's Liberation Army
- Xinjiang Production and Construction Corps

== Medal table ==
Like the previous games, the medal table did not only include the medals obtained from the games, but also included the medals obtained during the Olympics and Asian Games.

Rank	Delegations	Gold	Silver	Bronze	Total	Points
1	Shandong	65	47.5	43	155.5	2895.5
2	Liaoning	56	49.5	39.5	145	3143
3	Guangdong	50.5	34.5	36	121	2696.5
4	Shanghai	45	48	36.5	129.5	2460
5	People's Liberation Army	45	38	37	120	2327
5	Jiangsu	45	35	37	117	2588
6	Zhejiang	35	20	39	94	1718.5
7	Beijing	33	28	25	86	1682
8	Heilongjiang	22	15	29	66	1366.5
9	Tianjin	20	14	11	45	988
10	Fujian	18	23	22.5	63.5	1402.5
11	Hunan	15	13	13	41	801.5
12	Henan	14.5	7	18.5	40	1004
13	Sichuan	13	26	27	66	1643
14	Jilin	13	17	17	47	977
15	Shanxi	10	8	6	24	557
16	Shaanxi	9	11	11	31	608.5
17	Anhui	8.5	9	12	29.5	636.5
18	Hubei	8	18.5	14	40.5	794
19	Hebei	6	10	28	44	1205.5
20	Jiangxi	6	5	5.5	16.5	345.5
21	Xinjiang	6	8	2	16	333.5
22	Inner Mongolia	5	6	11	22	562
23	Chongqing	5	3	4	12	267.5
24	Yunnan	4	8	4	16	456
25	Guangxi	4	5	5	14	404.5
26	Qinghai	3	1	2	6	132
27	Hainan	3	1	1	5	142.5
28	Civil Defence and Police Sports Association	2	3	3	8	102
29	Gansu	2	4	1	7	271
30	Guizhou	1	4	6	11	244.5
31	Hong Kong	1	4	3	8	228
32	Tibet	1	1	0	2	42
33	Ningxia	0	0	2	2	100.5
34	Railways Sports Association	0	0	1	1	51
35	Xinjiang Production and Construction Corps	0	0	1	1	22.5
36	Macau	0	0	0	0	18.5
37	China Coal Sports Association	0	0	0	0	5.5
Total		574.5	525	553.5	1653	35,223.5

== See also ==
- 2008 National Winter Games of China
