= Jaeger (gymnastics) =

A Jaeger or Jäger is a move on horizontal bar or uneven bars in artistic gymnastics in which a gymnast swings backward in L-grip or reverse grip, and performs a front somersault, either in tuck, straddled, piked, or in layout (straight) position. The skill is named after Bernd Jäger, who was the first gymnast to perform the skill in an international competition.
