= National Games of China =

Four-year multi-sport event

National Games of the People's Republic of China 中华人民共和国全国运动会
- Abbreviation: All China Games
- Purpose: Multi-sport event for the elite athletes in the People's Republic of China
- Frequency: Every 4 years
- Inaugurated: 1959
- Website: en.olympic.cn/games/national

National Games of China
- Simplified Chinese: 中华人民共和国全国运动会
- Traditional Chinese: 中華人民共和國全國運動會
- Literal meaning: All-People's Republic of China Games
Transcriptions
Standard Mandarin
- Hanyu Pinyin: Zhōnghuá Rénmín Gònghéguó Quánguó Yùndònghuì
- Wade–Giles: Chunghua Jenmin Kunghekuo Ch'üankuo Yüntunghui

Abbreviation
- Simplified Chinese: 全国运动会
- Traditional Chinese: 全國運動會
Transcriptions
Standard Mandarin
- Hanyu Pinyin: Quánguó Yùndònghuì
- Wade–Giles: Ch'üankuo Yüntunghui

Alternative abbreviation
- Simplified Chinese: 全运会
- Traditional Chinese: 全運會
Transcriptions
Standard Mandarin
- Hanyu Pinyin: Quányùnhuì
- Wade–Giles: Ch'üanyünhui

The National Games of the People's Republic of China is the highest-level comprehensive multi-sport event of China. It is hosted by the General Administration of Sport of China. The games is held every four years, usually in the summer or autumn of the year after the Summer Olympics.

The National Games was first held in 1959 in Beijing at the Workers' Stadium, when 10,658 athletes competed across 384 events in 42 sports.

== List of the National Games ==
Host cities of the National Games

Games	Host	Year	Dates	Teams	Athletes	Sports	Events	Ref
1	Beijing	1959	13 September – 3 October	29	10,658	42	384	
2	Beijing	1965	11–28 September	29	5,014	23	300	
3	Beijing	1975	12–28 September	31	12,497	42	310	
4	Beijing	1979	15–30 September	31	15,189	36	469	
5	Shanghai	1983	18 September – 1 October	31	8,943	26	277	
6	Guangdong	1987	20 November – 5 December	37	7,228	44	343	
7	Beijing	1993	4–15 September	45	7,481	43	374	
8	Shanghai	1997	12–24 October	45	7,943	28	319	
9	Guangdong	2001	11–25 November	45	8,608	30	345	
10	Jiangsu	2005	12–23 October	42	9,986	32	483	
11	Shandong	2009	16–28 October	46	10,991	33	551	
12	Liaoning	2013	31 August – 12 September	39	9,770	31	350	
13	Tianjin	2017	27 August – 8 September	38	8,478	33	417	
14	Shaanxi	2021	15–27 September	~39	~12,000	36	412	
15	Guangdong; Hong Kong; Macau	2025	9–21 November		14,252	34	419	
16	Hunan	2029						

== See also ==
- All-China Games
- Asian Games
- China National Youth Games
- East Asian Games
- Football at the National Games of China
- Artistic Gymnastics at the National Games of China
- National Peasants' Games
- Olympic Games
- Sport in China
- 2025 National Games for Persons with Disabilities of China
