= Chinese Artistic Gymnastics Championships =

Chinese artistic gymnastics competition

The Chinese Artistic Gymnastics Championships is an annual Chinese national artistic gymnastics competition.

== Women's medalists ==
=== Team ===
Year	Location	Gold	Silver	Bronze
2008	Tianjin	Guangdong	Shanghai	Beijing
2009	Jinan, Shandong	Shanghai	Zhejiang	Guangdong
2010	Zhuzhou, Hunan	Guangdong	Zhejiang	Shanghai
2011	Kunshan, Zhejiang	Shanghai	Zhejiang	Guangdong
2012	Shanghai	Shanghai	Guangdong	Hunan
2013	Dalian	Shanghai	Guangdong	Hunan
2014	Nanning	Zhejiang	Guangdong	Hunan
2015	Fuzhou	Hunan	Shanghai	Guangdong
2016	Hefei	Hunan	Guangdong	Shanghai
2017	Wuhan	Guangdong	Beijing	Hunan
2018	Zhaoqing	Guangdong	Beijing	Zhejiang
2019	Zhaoqing	Guangdong	Beijing	Zhejiang
2020	Zhaoqing	Guangdong	Beijing	Zhejiang
2021	Chengdu	Guangdong	Beijing	Zhejiang
2022	Hangzhou	Guangdong	Zhejiang	Anhui
2023	Jinan, Shandong	Guangdong	Zhejiang	Shanghai
2024	Zhaoqing	Zhejiang	Guangdong	Fujian
2025	Nanning	Zhejiang	Guangdong	Henan
2026	Xiamen	Guangdong	Fujian	Zhejiang

=== All-around ===
Year	Location	Gold	Silver	Bronze
2007	Shanghai	Yang Yilin	Xiao Sha	He Ning
2008	Tianjin	Jiang Yuyuan	Yang Yilin	Deng Linlin
2009	Jinan, Shandong	He Ning	Huang Qiushuang	Xiao Sha
2010	Zhuzhou, Hunan	Sui Lu	Jiang Yuyuan	Huang Qiushuang
2011	Kunshan, Zhejiang	Tan Sixin	Yao Jinnan	Zeng Siqi
2012	Shanghai	Deng Linlin	Jiang Yuyuan	Tan Sixin Shang Chunsong
2013	Dalian	Yao Jinnan	Shang Chunsong	Zeng Siqi
2014	Nanning	Yao Jinnan	Shang Chunsong	Wang Yan
2015	Fuzhou	Shang Chunsong	Wang Yan	Chen Siyi
2016	Hefei	Shang Chunsong	Mao Yi	Liu Tingting
2017	Wuhan	Luo Huan	Chen Yile	Liu Jingxing
2018	Zhaoqing	Luo Huan	Zhang Jin	Tang Xijing
2019	Zhaoqing	Liu Tingting	Luo Huan	Ou Yushan
2020	Zhaoqing	Liu Tingting	Wei Xiaoyuan	Qi Qi
2021	Chengdu	Lu Yufei	Zhang Jin	Li Shijia
2022	Hangzhou	Tang Xijing	Ou Yushan	He Licheng
2023	Jinan, Shandong	Qiu Qiyuan	Ou Yushan	Zhang Qingying
2024	Zhaoqing	Qiu Qiyuan	Ou Yushan	Zhou Yaqin
2025	Nanning	Zhang Qingying	Qin Xinyi	Zhang Yihan
2026	Xiamen	Ke Qinqin	Zhang Qingying	Zhang Yihan

=== Vault ===
Year	Location	Gold	Silver	Bronze
2008	Tianjin	Cheng Fei	Deng Shaojie	Deng Linlin
2009	Jinan, Shandong	Cheng Fei	Deng Shaojie	Yang Pei
2010	Zhuzhou, Hunan	Zhou Qiaohong	Huang Qiushuang	Yang Pei
2011	Kunshan, Zhejiang	Li Yiting	Cheng Fei	Jiang Tong
2012	Shanghai	Cheng Fei	Li Yiting	Yang Pei
2013	Dalian	Yuan Xiaoyang	Yang Pei	Deng Yalan
2014	Nanning	Wang Yan	Deng Yalan	Liu Jinru
2015	Fuzhou	Wang Yan	Li Linxi	Liu Jinru
2016	Hefei	Yuan Xiaoyang	Liu Jinru	Jing Yang
2017	Wuhan	Liu Jinru	Qi Qi	Yu Linmin
2018	Zhaoqing	Liu Jinru Qi Qi	Not Awarded	Yu Linmin
2019	Zhaoqing	Liu Jinru	Qi Qi	Deng Yalan
2020	Zhaoqing	Qi Qi	Yu Linmin	Liu Jinru
2021	Chengdu	Deng Yalan	Liu Jinru	Yu Linmin
2022	Hangzhou	Yu Linmin	Zhang Qingying	Wu Jianqiong
2023	Jinan, Shandong	Yu Linmin	Wang Yan	Zhang Qingying
2024	Zhaoqing	Yu Linmin	Zhang Yihan	Ye Dandan
2025	Nanning	Liu Jinru	Deng Yalan	Yu Linmin
2026	Xiamen	Du Siyu	Zhang Yihan	Yu Linmin

=== Uneven Bars ===
Year	Location	Gold	Silver	Bronze
2008	Tianjin	He Kexin	Yang Yilin	Pang Panpan
2009	Jinan, Shandong	Jiang Yuyuan	Xiao Kangjun	He Ning
2010	Zhuzhou, Hunan	Huang Qiushuang	Wu Liufang	Huang Huidan
2011	Kunshan, Zhejiang	He Kexin	Yao Jinnan	Huang Huidan
2012	Shanghai	He Kexin	Huang Huidan	Tan Jiaxin
2013	Dalian	Huang Huidan	He Kexin	Yao Jinnan
2014	Nanning	Yao Jinnan	Shang Chunsong Huang Huidan	Not Awarded
2015	Fuzhou	Fan Yilin	Huang Huidan	Zhu Xiaofang
2016	Hefei	Fan Yilin	Tan Jiaxin	Huang Huidan
2017	Wuhan	Luo Huan	Du Siyu	Fan Yilin
2018	Zhaoqing	Lyu Jiaqi	Luo Huan	Chen Yile
2019	Zhaoqing	Liu Tingting	Cheng Shiyi	Ou Yushan
2020	Zhaoqing	Fan Yilin	Cheng Shiyi	Liu Tingting
2021	Chengdu	Fan Yilin	Luo Rui Wei Xiaoyuan	Not Awarded
2022	Hangzhou	Luo Rui	Wei Xiaoyuan	Tang Xijing
2023	Jinan, Shandong	Qiu Qiyuan	Huang Zhuofan	Wei Xiaoyuan
2024	Zhaoqing	Qiu Qiyuan	Huang Zhuofan	Ou Yushan
2025	Nanning	Yang Fanyuwei	Xie Guying	Zhong Qi
2026	Xiamen	Yang Fanyuwei	Zhong Qi	Xie Guying

=== Balance Beam ===
Year	Location	Gold	Silver	Bronze
2008	Tianjin	Sui Lu	Guo Wei	Zhang Nan
2009	Jinan, Shandong	Cui Jie	Li Shanshan Zhang Yujiao	Not Awarded
2010	Zhuzhou, Hunan	Sui Lu	Jiang Yuyuan	Wu Liufang Zhou Jiabei
2011	Kunshan, Zhejiang	Sui Lu	Zeng Siqi	Zhang Yelinzi
2012	Shanghai	Tan Sixin	Zeng Siqi	Sui Lu
2013	Dalian	Shang Chunsong	Deng Linlin	Tan Sixin
2014	Nanning	Shang Chunsong	Bai Yawen	Liu Tingting
2015	Fuzhou	Shang Chunsong	Luo Youjuan	Fan Yilin
2016	Hefei	Shang Chunsong	Liu Tingting	Chen Xiaoqing
2017	Wuhan	Zhu Xiaofang	Li Qi Li Hairuo	Not Awarded
2018	Zhaoqing	Luo Huan	Chen Yile Guan Chenchen	Not Awarded
2019	Zhaoqing	Ou Yushan	Tang Xijing	Qi Qi
2020	Zhaoqing	Guan Chenchen	Wei Xiaoyuan	Liu Tingting
2021	Chengdu	Li Shijia	Lu Yufei	Tang Xijing
2022	Hangzhou	Qiu Qiyuan	Sun Xinyi	Ou Yushan
2023	Jinan, Shandong	Qiu Qiyuan	Zhang Qingying	Ou Yushan
2024	Zhaoqing	Zhou Yaqin	Zhang Qingying	Qiu Qiyuan
2025	Nanning	Zhou Yaqin	Zhang Qingying	Yu Wenjing
2026	Xiamen	Zhang Qingying	Chen Ziyan	Ke Qinqin

=== Floor Exercise ===
Year	Location	Gold	Silver	Bronze
2008	Tianjin	Cheng Fei Sui Lu	None awarded	Yang Yilin
2009	Jinan, Shandong	Cheng Fei	Jiang Yuyuan	Huang Qiushuang
2010	Zhuzhou, Hunan	Sui Lu	Huang Qiushuang	Jiang Yuyuan
2011	Kunshan, Zhejiang	Sui Lu	Zeng Siqi	Yao Jinnan
2012	Shanghai	Sui Lu	Tan Sixin	Cheng Fei
2013	Dalian	Sui Lu Shang Chunsong	Not Awarded	Yao Jinnan
2014	Nanning	Shang Chunsong	Yao Jinnan	Wang Yan
2015	Fuzhou	Wang Yan	Shang Chunsong	Luo Huan
2016	Hefei	Shang Chunsong	Mao Yi	Li Qi
2017	Wuhan	Shang Chunsong	Liu Tingting	Liu Jingxing
2018	Zhaoqing	Liu Jinru	Yin Sisi	Zhao Shiting
2019	Zhaoqing	Shang Chunsong	Ou Yushan	Liu Tingting
2020	Zhaoqing	Qi Qi	Wu Ran	Lu Yufei
2021	Chengdu	Lu Yufei	Zuo Tong	Shang Chunsong
2022	Hangzhou	Xiang Lulu	Jin Xiaoxuan	Zhao Jiayi
2023	Jinan, Shandong	Zhou Yaqin	Zhang Qingying	Shang Chunsong
2024	Zhaoqing	Yang Jingxi	Chen Xinyi	Qiu Qiyuan
2025	Nanning	Zhang Yihan	Zhou Yaqin	Yang Jingxi
2026	Xiamen	Zhang Yihan	Ke Qinqin	Zhang Qingying

== Men’s medalists ==
=== Team ===
Year	Location	Gold	Silver	Bronze
2008	Tianjin	Guangdong	Sichuan	People's Liberation Army
2009	Jinan, Shandong	Guangdong	Jiangsu	Tianjin
2010	Zhuzhou, Hunan	Jiangsu	Guangdong	Guizhou
2011	Kunshan, Zhejiang	Jiangsu	Guangdong	People's Liberation Army
2012	Shanghai	Guizhou	Guangdong	Jiangsu
2013	Dalian	Guangdong	Guizhou	Shandong
2014	Nanning	Guizhou	Guangxi	People's Liberation Army
2015	Fuzhou	Guizhou	Guangdong	People's Liberation Army
2016	Hefei	Guizhou	Guangdong	Jiangsu
2017	Wuhan	Jiangsu	Guangdong	Guangxi
2018	Zhaoqing	Jiangsu	Hunan	Beijing
2019	Zhaoqing	People's Liberation Army	Jiangsu	Guangdong
2020	Zhaoqing	Jiangsu	Guangdong	Guangxi
2021	Chengdu	Jiangsu	Hunan	Guangxi
2022	Hangzhou	Jiangsu	Hunan	Zhejiang
2023	Jinan, Shandong	Jiangsu	Hunan	Guangdong
2024	Zhaoqing	Jiangsu	Hunan	Guangdong
2025	Nanning	Jiangsu	Hunan	Guangdong
2026	Xiamen	Zhejiang	Hunan	Jiangsu

=== All-around ===
Year	Location	Gold	Silver	Bronze
2007	Shanghai	Yang Wei	Chen Yibing	Teng Haibin
2008	Tianjin	Yang Wei	Feng Zhe	Teng Haibin
2009	Jinan, Shandong	Feng Jing	Guo Weiyang	Feng Zhe
2010	Zhuzhou, Hunan	Guo Weiyang	Liao Qiuhua	Lü Bo Tong Yingjie
2011	Kunshan, Zhejiang	Guo Weiyang Teng Haibin	Not Awarded	Lü Bo
2012	Shanghai	Guo Weiyang	Huang Yuguo	Teng Haibin
2013	Dalian	Liu Rongbing	Lin Chaopan	Deng Shudi
2014	Nanning	Deng Shudi	Liu Rongbing	Lin Chaopan
2015	Fuzhou	Deng Shudi	Zhou Shixiong	Lin Chaopan
2016	Hefei	Lin Chaopan	Deng Shudi	Liu Rongbing
2017	Wuhan	Lin Chaopan	Xiao Ruoteng	Deng Shudi
2018	Zhaoqing	Xiao Ruoteng	Sun Wei	Deng Shudi
2019	Zhaoqing	Deng Shudi	Sun Wei	You Hao
2020	Zhaoqing	Sun Wei	Xiao Ruoteng	Deng Shudi
2021	Chengdu	Xiao Ruoteng	Zhang Boheng	Lin Chaopan
2022	Hangzhou	Zhang Boheng	Sun Wei	Yang Jiaxing
2023	Jinan, Shandong	Zhang Boheng	Shi Cong	Ta Yinga
2024	Zhaoqing	Shi Cong	Xiao Ruoteng	Sun Wei
2025	Nanning	Zhang Boheng	Shi Cong	Lan Xingyu
2026	Xiamen	Yang Haonan	Zhang Boheng	Wang Chengcheng

=== Floor Exercise ===
Year	Location	Gold	Silver	Bronze
2008	Tianjin	Zou Kai Liang Fuliang	None awarded	Zhang Chenglong
2009	Jinan, Shandong	Du Wei	Tong Yingjie	Luo Zepeng
2010	Zhuzhou, Hunan	Zhang Chenglong	Du Wei	Zou Kai
2011	Kunshan, Zhejiang	Zhang Chenglong	Zou Kai	Du Wei
2012	Shanghai	Zou Kai	Zhang Chenglong	Cheng Ran Zheng Shudi
2013	Dalian	Deng Xiaofeng	Cheng Ran	Sun Bing
2014	Nanning	Deng Xiaofeng	Gu Baisen	Deng Shudi
2015	Fuzhou	Lin Chaopan	Wei Xin	Deng Shudi
2016	Hefei	Deng Shudi	Mu Jile	Wang Haoran
2017	Wuhan	Mu Jile	Xiao Ruoteng Sun Wei	Not Awarded
2018	Zhaoqing	Wang Haoran	Su Weide	Shi Cong
2019	Zhaoqing	Xiao Ruoteng	Wang Haoran	Zhang Junkun
2020	Zhaoqing	Deng Shudi	Wang Haoran	Zhou Caisong
2021	Chengdu	Zhang Boheng	Chen Feng	Mu Jile
2022	Hangzhou	Zhang Boheng	Su Weide	Ge Shihao
2023	Jinan, Shandong	Ge Shihao	Su Weide	Li Hongyan
2024	Zhaoqing	Su Weide	Yang Yanzhi	Xiao Ruoteng
2025	Nanning	Wang Haoyu	Ge Shilong	Chen Zhilong
2026	Xiamen	Su Weide	Wang Chengcheng	Chen Zhilong

=== Pommel Horse ===
Year	Location	Gold	Silver	Bronze
2008	Tianjin	Xiao Qin	Zhang Hongtao	Chen Chen
2009	Jinan, Shandong	Zhang Hongtao	Teng Haibin	Lu Chenxi
2010	Zhuzhou, Hunan	Zhang Hongtao	Chen Chen	Teng Haibin
2011	Kunshan, Zhejiang	Zhang Hongtao	Xiao Qin	Guo Weiyang
2012	Shanghai	Xiao Qin	Zhang Hongtao	Fu Yu You Hao
2013	Dalian	Zhang Hongtao	Chen Xuezhang	Fu Yu
2014	Nanning	Wang Bo	Xiao Ruoteng	Weng Hao
2015	Fuzhou	Xiao Ruoteng	Chen Xuezhang	Deng Shudi
2016	Hefei	Weng Hao	Zou Jingyuan	He Yunlong
2017	Wuhan	Zou Jingyuan	Xiao Ruoteng	Wang Junwen
2018	Zhaoqing	Weng Hao	Yan Renpeng	Li Yi
2019	Zhaoqing	Weng Hao	Xiao Ruoteng	Yao Jianshan
2020	Zhaoqing	Zou Jingyuan	Xiao Ruoteng	Wang Junwen
2021	Chengdu	Weng Hao	Wang Junwen	Yao Jianshan
2022	Hangzhou	Lu Chongcan	Tian Hao	Zhang Boheng
2023	Jinan, Shandong	Sun Wei	Lu Chongcan	Yin Dehang
2024	Zhaoqing	Zou Jingyuan	Lu Chongcan	Zhang Boheng
2025	Nanning	Hong Yanming	Li Liang	Lu Chongcan
2026	Xiamen	Hong Yanming	Lei Qingzhu Lu Chongcan	Not Awarded

=== Still Rings ===
Year	Location	Gold	Silver	Bronze
2008	Tianjin	Chen Yibing Yang Wei	None awarded	Yan Mingyong
2009	Jinan, Shandong	Yan Hingyong	Chen Yibin	Ta Zhuyong
2010	Zhuzhou, Hunan	Chen Yibing Yan Mingyong	Not Awarded	Liao Junlin Luo Xuan
2011	Kunshan, Zhejiang	Chen Yibing Yan Mingyong	Not Awarded	Liao Junlin
2012	Shanghai	Chen Yibing	Liao Junlin	Luo Xuan
2013	Dalian	Yan Mingyong	Liu Yang	Liao Junlin
2014	Nanning	Liu Yang	Liao Junlin	Wu Guanhua
2015	Fuzhou	Liu Yang	Lei Peng	You Hao
2016	Hefei	Liu Yang	You Hao	Liao Junlin
2017	Wuhan	Lan Xingyu	Lei Peng	Wu Guanhua
2018	Zhaoqing	Lan Xingyu	Lei Peng	Wu Guanhua
2019	Zhaoqing	Lei Peng	Lan Xingyu	Deng Shudi
2020	Zhaoqing	Liu Yang	Lan Xingyu	You Hao
2021	Chengdu	Liu Yang	Lan Xingyu	You Hao
2022	Hangzhou	You Hao	Zou Jingyuan	Ye Diqing
2023	Jinan, Shandong	Liu Yang	Lan Xingyu	Zhang Boheng
2024	Zhaoqing	Liu Yang	Zou Jingyuan	You Hao
2025	Nanning	Liu Yang	You Hao	Lan Xingyu
2026	Xiamen	Lan Xingyu	Liu Hengyu	Yang Haonan

=== Vault ===
Year	Location	Gold	Silver	Bronze
2008	Tianjin	Guo Jiahao	Hu Junjie	Liang Mingsheng
2009	Jinan, Shandong	Huang Yuguo	Yang Jinhui	Zhang Chenglong
2010	Zhuzhou, Hunan	Du Wei	Zhang Zhongbo	Lü Bo
2011	Kunshan, Zhejiang	Zhang Zhongbo	Feng Zhe	Lü Bo
2012	Shanghai	Xue Ruiyang	Luo Zepeng	Cao Yulong
2013	Dalian	Cheng Ran	Zhang Zhongbo	Luo Zepeng
2014	Nanning	Huang Mingqi Qu Ruiyang	Not Awarded	Huang Xi
2015	Fuzhou	Qu Ruiyang	Huang Mingqi	Cheng Ran
2016	Hefei	Qu Ruiyang	Wang Haoran	Luo Zepeng
2017	Wuhan	Qu Ruiyang	Shi Yimin	Tao Haopeng
2018	Zhaoqing	Huang Mingqi	Zhang Yijia	Wei Huyi
2019	Zhaoqing	Cen Yu	Huang Mingqi	Qu Ruiyang
2020	Zhaoqing	Huang Mingqi	Qu Ruiyang	Chen Yilu
2021	Chengdu	Huang Mingqi	Xiang Xudong	Liu Yang
2022	Hangzhou	Chen Yilu	Liu Yang	Chen Zhiyi
2023	Jinan, Shandong	Chen Yilu	Wu Jianhao	He Quqin
2024	Zhaoqing	Huang Mingqi	Chen Zhilong	Chen Yilu
2025	Nanning	Huang Mingqi	Hu Youtian	Chen Zhilong
2026	Xiamen	Li Hongyan	Hu Youtian	Chen Zhilong

=== Parallel Bars ===
Year	Location	Gold	Silver	Bronze
2008	Tianjin	Huang Xu	Feng Zhe	Yang Wei
2009	Jinan, Shandong	Feng Zhe Wang Guanyin	Not Awarded	Guo Weiyang
2010	Zhuzhou, Hunan	Feng Zhe Wang Guanyin	Not Awarded	Dong Zhen Guo Weiyang
2011	Kunshan, Zhejiang	Feng Zhe	Teng Haibin	Guo Weiyang
2012	Shanghai	Feng Zhe	Wang Guanyin	Teng Haibin
2013	Dalian	You Hao	Tang Xingxing	Wang Guanyin
2014	Nanning	Deng Shudi You Hao	Not Awarded	Cheng Ran Liu Rongbing
2015	Fuzhou	He Youxiao Zhou Shixiong	Not Awarded	Lin Chaopan
2016	Hefei	Lin Chaopan	Zhou Shixiong	Liu Rongbing
2017	Wuhan	Zou Jingyuan	Lin Chaopan	He Youxiao
2018	Zhaoqing	Zou Jingyuan	Wu Xiaoming	Liu Rongbing
2019	Zhaoqing	Zou Jingyuan	Liu Rongbing	Sun Wei
2020	Zhaoqing	Wu Xiaoming	Zou Jingyuan	You Hao
2021	Chengdu	Zou Jingyuan	You Hao	Lin Chaopan
2022	Hangzhou	You Hao	Yin Dehang	Zhang Boheng
2023	Jinan, Shandong	Zou Jingyuan	Yin Dehang	Zhang Boheng
2024	Zhaoqing	Zou Jingyuan	You Hao	Hu Xuwei
2025	Nanning	Zou Jingyuan	You Hao	Xie Chenyi
2026	Xiamen	Zhang Boheng	Yang Haonan	Sun Wei

=== Horizontal Bar ===
Year	Location	Gold	Silver	Bronze
2008	Tianjin	Zou Kai	Feng Zhe	He Jiajin
2009	Jinan, Shandong	Guo Weiyang	Zhang Chenglong	Li Peng
2010	Zhuzhou, Hunan	Zhang Chenglong	Zou Kai	Chen Xuezhang
2011	Kunshan, Zhejiang	Zou Kai	Liu Rongbing	Lü Junhai
2012	Shanghai	Zou Kai	Zhang Chenglong	Zhou Shixiong
2013	Dalian	Zou Shixiong	Liu Rongbing	Lin Chaopan
2014	Nanning	Deng Shudi Yang Shengchao	Not Awarded	Zhu Zhenquan
2015	Fuzhou	Xiao Ruoteng	Zhang Chenglong	Sun Wei
2016	Hefei	Zhang Chenglong	Lin Chaopan	Liu Rongbing
2017	Wuhan	Xiao Ruoteng	Sun Wei	Ji Lianshen
2018	Zhaoqing	Deng Shudi Zhang Chenglong	Not Awarded	Xiao Ruoteng
2019	Zhaoqing	Lin Chaopan	Lui Rongbing	Zeng Jiajun
2020	Zhaoqing	Ji Lianshen	Lin Chaopan	Xiang Bagenqiu
2021	Chengdu	Ji Lianshen	Lin Chaopan	Sun Wei
2022	Hangzhou	Zhang Boheng	Sun Wei	Tian Hao
2023	Jinan, Shandong	Zhang Boheng	Liao Jialei	Li Hongyan
2024	Zhaoqing	Shi Cong	Tian Hao	Xiao Ruoteng
2025	Nanning	Huang Mingqi	Zhang Songhonghao	Yang Haonan
2026	Xiamen	Tian Hao	Su Weide	Liao Jialei
