= 2010 Chinese Artistic Gymnastics Championships =

- Location: (China) Zhuzhou, Hunan
- Start date: August 22, 2010
- End date: August 31, 2010

The 2010 Chinese Artistic Gymnastics Championships were held from 22 August to 31 August 2010 in Zhuzhou, Hunan. It was also the qualification event for the 2010 Asian Games and 2010 World Artistic Gymnastics Championships.

== Men's Event Medal Winners ==
Event	Gold	Silver	Bronze
Team	Jiangsu	Guangdong	Guizhou
All-around	Guo Weiyang	Liao Qiuhua	Lü Bo; Tong Yingjie
Floor	Zhang Chenglong	Du Wei	Zou Kai
Pommel horse	Zhang Hongtao	Chen Chen	Teng Haibin
Rings	Chen Yibing; Yan Mingyong	not awarded	Liao Junlin; Luo Xuan
Vault	Du Wei	Zhang Zhongbo	Lü Bo
Parallel bars	Feng Zhe; Wang Guanyin	not awarded	Dong Zhen; Guo Weiyang
Horizontal bar	Zhang Chenglong	Zou Kai	Chen Xuezhang

== Women's Event Medal Winners ==
Event	Gold	Silver	Bronze
Team	Guangdong	Zhejiang	Shanghai
All-around	Sui Lu	Jiang Yuyuan	Huang Qiushuang
Vault	Zhou Qiaohong	Huang Qiushuang	Yang Pei
Uneven Bars	Huang Qiushuang	Wu Liufang	Huang Huidan
Balance Beam	Sui Lu	Jiang Yuyuan	Wu Liufang; Zhou Jiabei
Floor	Sui Lu	Huang Qiushuang	Jiang Yuyuan
