= 2009 Chinese Artistic Gymnastics Championships =

- Location: (China) Jinan, Shandong
- Start date: May 13, 2009
- End date: May 17, 2009

The 2009 Chinese Artistic Gymnastics Championships were held from 13 May to 17 May 2009 in Jinan, Shandong.

== Men's Event Medal Winners ==
Event	Gold	Silver	Bronze
Team	Guangdong	Jiangsu	Tianjin
All-around	Feng Jing	Guo Weiyang	Feng Zhe
Floor	Du Wei	Tong Yingjie	Luo Zepeng
Pommel horse	Zhang Hongtao	Teng Haibin	Lu Chenxi
Rings	Yan Mingyong	Chen Yibing	Tao Zhuyong
Vault	Huang Yuguo	Yang Jinhui	Zhang Chenglong
Parallel bars	Feng Zhe; Wang Guanyin	not awarded	Guo Weiyang
Horizontal bar	Guo Weiyang	Zhang Chenglong	Li Peng

== Women's Event Medal Winners ==
Event	Gold	Silver	Bronze
Team	Shanghai	Zhejiang	Guangdong
All-around	He Ning	Huang Qiushuang	Xiao Sha
Vault	Cheng Fei	Deng Shaojie	Yang Pei
Uneven Bars	Jiang Yuyuan	Xiao Kangjun	He Ning
Balance Beam	Cui Jie	Li Shanshan; Zhang Yujiao	not awarded
Floor	Cheng Fei	Jiang Yuyuan	Huang Qiushuang
