= 2013 Chinese Artistic Gymnastics Championships =

Gymnastics competition in Dalian, China

- Location: (China) Dalian, Liaoning
- Start date: May 8, 2013
- End date: May 12, 2013

The 2013 Chinese Artistic Gymnastics Championships were held from 8 May to 12 May 2013 in Dalian.

== Men's event medal winners ==
Event	Gold	Silver	Bronze
Team	Guangdong	Guizhou	Shandong
All-around	Liu Rongbing (Guizhou)	Lin Chaopan (Fujian)	Deng Shudi (Guizhou)
Floor	Deng Xiaofeng (PLA)	Cheng Ran (Beijing)	Sun Bing (Tianjin)
Pommel horse	Zhang Hongtao (Shanxi)	Chen Xuezhang (Fujian)	Fu Yu (Tianjin)
Rings	Yan Mingyong (Shanghai)	Liu Yang (PLA)	Liao Junlin (Guangxi)
Vault	Cheng Ran (Beijing)	Zhang Zhongbo (Shanghai)	Luo Zepeng (Sichuan)
Parallel bars	You Hao (Jiangsu)	Tang Xingxing (Jiangxi)	Wang Guanyin (Tianjin)
Horizontal bar	Zhou Shixiong (Guangdong)	Liu Rongbing (Guizhou)	Lin Chaopan (Fujian)

== Women's event medal winners ==
Event	Gold	Silver	Bronze
Team	Sui Lu; Tan Sixin; Xiao Kangjun; Yang Tianyi; Zhang Yiqian; Fan Yilin (Shanghai)	Huang Qiushuang; Wu Liufang; Chen Li; Luo Peiru; Liu Tingting; Xu Chujun (Guangdong)	Zeng Siqi; Shang Chunsong; Tan Jiaxin; Deng Chunfen; Cui Jie; Xie Yufen (Hunan)
All Around	Yao Jinnan (Fujian)	Shang Chunsong (Hunan)	Zeng Siqi (Hunan)
Vault	Yuan Xiaoyang (Zhejiang)	Yang Pei (Shaanxi)	Deng Yalan (Jiangxi)
Uneven Bars	Huang Huidan (Zhejiang)	He Kexin (Beijing)	Yao Jinnan (Fujian)
Balance Beam	Shang Chunsong (Hunan)	Deng Linlin (Anhui)	Tan Sixin (Shanghai)
Floor	Sui Lu (Shanghai); Shang Chunsong (Hunan)		Yao Jinnan (Fujian)

=== Women's All-Around Qualification ===
Rank	Gymnast	Team	Vault (gymnastics)	Uneven bars	Balance beam	Floor (gymnastics)	Total
1	Yao Jinnan	Fujian	14.434	14.967	14.367	13.700	57.468
2	Shang Chunsong	Hunan	13.567	13.234	14.167	13.767	54.735
3	Huang Qiushuang	Guangdong	13.834	14.034	13.767	13.100	54.735
4	Zeng Siqi	Hunan	13.634	12.567	14.700	13.734	54.635
5	Liu Tingting	Guangdong	13.734	13.614	13.934	13.300	54.582
6	Xiao Kangjun	Shanghai	14.034	14.167	12.767	13.434	54.402
7	Tan Sixin	Shanghai	13.300	13.300	14.267	13.534	54.401
8	Huang Huidan	Zhejiang	12.400	15.267	13.434	13.067	54.168
9	Luo Peiru	Guangdong	14.300	12.700	13.734	13.134	53.868
10	Lv Jiaqi	Zhejiang	13.434	13.467	13.467	13.400	53.768
11	Deng Linlin	Anhui	13.767	12.700	13.834	13.234	53.535
12	Wang Yan	Beijing	13.667	12.234	14.234	13.234	53.369
13	Deng Chunfen	Hunan	13.634	13.600	12.934	13.000	53.168
14	Yuan Xiaoyang	Zhejiang	13.834	12.267	13.767	13.034	52.902
15	Feng Xiao	Hunan	13.367	12.767	13.334	13.134	52.602
16	Zhang Yelinzi	Hubei	13.700	12.200	13.200	13.134	52.234
17	Mei Jie	Hubei	13.100	13.034	12.567	13.067	51.768
18	Li Shanshan	Hebei	13.334	12.900	12.367	13.034	51.635
19	Chen Siyi	Fujian	13.567	12.734	13.234	11.934	51.469
20	Zhu Siyan	Zhejiang	13.134	13.500	11.800	12.900	51.334
21	Zheng Wen	Shandong	13.567	11.534	12.134	12.867	50.102
22	He Wenxiu	Liaoning	13.267	11.800	13.000	12.034	50.101
23	Zhu Xiaofang	Guangdong	12.034	12.700	12.967	12.300	50.001
24	He Chuchu	Hubei	13.700	11.134	12.900	12.167	49.901
25	Zeng Shixia	Sichuan	13.100	12.400	11.567	12.367	49.434
26	Yang Ruxue	Shanghai	13.534	10.267	13.300	12.267	49.368
27	Tao Yebaihe	Hubei	12.400	11.934	12.467	12.267	49.068
28	Wang Qianmei	Yunnan	12.400	12.000	12.234	12.267	48.901
29	Zhang Wenxin	Hebei	12.734	10.834	13.467	11.834	48.869
30	Huang Jing	Anhui	13.434	11.667	11.300	12.400	48.801
31	Liu Tianyang	Hebei	12.900	11.600	12.534	11.567	48.604
32	Wei Ruitong	Guangxi	13.634	11.067	12.400	11.434	48.535
33	Qin Chang	Jiangsu	12.067	10.534	12.567	13.100	48.268
34	Fu Yuyao	Sichuan	11.634	11.834	12.500	12.300	48.268
35	Lü Yawen	Guizhou	12.934	9.900	12.767	12.634	48.235
36	Wang Qiuling	Liaoning	12.234	10.800	13.000	12.200	48.234
37	Bai Yawen	Guangxi	12.234	12.467	11.334	12.067	48.102
38	Zheng Luosha	Jiangxi	12.967	11.034	11.867	12.100	47.968
39	Deng Yalan	Jiangxi	13.534	10.400	11.500	12.467	47.901
40	Lu Yufei	Henan	12.834	10.567	11.400	12.800	47.601
41	Zheng Yan	Hebei	12.834	12.267	10.267	12.200	47.568
42	Song Yuxuan	Beijing	12.300	10.867	11.934	12.300	47.401
43	Li Manyu	Anhui	12.834	11.800	11.200	11.334	47.168
44	Huang Peijun	Fujian	13.834	10.100	11.334	11.834	47.102
45	Xie Wenwei	Zhejiang	12.167	11.900	10.700	12.334	47.101
46	Hu Xin	Jiangxi	12.367	11.700	11.067	11.900	47.034
47	Luo Danfangjun	Hubei	13.334	11.000	10.200	12.334	46.868
48	Lin Jinyu	Jiangxi	12.300	11.367	11.134	11.867	46.668
61	Sui Lu	Shanghai	13.534		14.600	13.767	41.901
62	He Kexin	Beijing	13.534	15.100		12.767	41.401
63	Xu Chujun	Guangdong	13.600		13.600	13.767	40.967
64	Cui Jie	Hunan	13.900		13.500	13.534	40.934
65	Jiang Tong	Tianjin	14.167		13.100	13.634	40.901
66	Fan Yilin	Shanghai		14.334	13.467	12.767	40.568
72	Yang Tianyi	Shanghai	14.167		11.067	12.200	37.434
93	Wu Liufang	Guangdong		14.134	12.634		26.768
94	Li Yiting	Beijing	14.300	11.834			26.134
95	Luo Huan	Zhejiang		14.034	12.000		26.034
99	Xiao Ziqian	Guangdong	13.767			11.734	25.501
101	Yang Pei	Shaanxi	13.600			11.634	25.234
104	Li Yiwei	Henan	13.700			10.900	24.600

=== Women's Team Final ===
Rank	Team	Vault (gymnastics)	Uneven bars	Balance beam	Floor (gymnastics)	Total
1st place, gold medalist(s)	Shanghai	54.435 (4)	55.568 (2)	55.768 (1)	53.869 (2)	219.640
1st place, gold medalist(s)	Tan Sixin	13.300	13.300	14.267	13.534	219.640
1st place, gold medalist(s)	Sui Lu	13.534		14.600	13.767	219.640
1st place, gold medalist(s)	Xiao Kangjun	14.034	14.167	12.767	13.434	219.640
1st place, gold medalist(s)	Fan Yilin		14.334	13.467	12.767	219.640
1st place, gold medalist(s)	Zhang Yiqian	13.567	13.767			219.640
1st place, gold medalist(s)	Xu Li		10.434	13.434	13.134	219.640
2nd place, silver medalist(s)	Guangdong	55.468 (2)	55.582 (1)	55.035 (3)	53.301 (3)	219.386
2nd place, silver medalist(s)	Huang Qiushuang	13.834	14.034	13.767	13.100	219.386
2nd place, silver medalist(s)	Liu Tingting	13.734	13.614	13.934	13.300	219.386
2nd place, silver medalist(s)	Luo Peiru	14.300	12.700	13.734	13.134	219.386
2nd place, silver medalist(s)	Xu Chujun	13.600		13.600	13.767	219.386
2nd place, silver medalist(s)	Wu Liufang		14.134	12.634		219.386
2nd place, silver medalist(s)	Chen Li		13.800		11.934	219.386
3rd place, bronze medalist(s)	Hunan	55.868 (1)	54.001 (4)	55.301 (2)	54.035 (1)	219.205
3rd place, bronze medalist(s)	Deng Chunfen	13.634	13.600	12.934	13.000	219.205
3rd place, bronze medalist(s)	Zeng Siqi	13.634	12.567	14.700	13.734	219.205
3rd place, bronze medalist(s)	Shang Chunsong	13.567	13.234	14.167	13.767	219.205
3rd place, bronze medalist(s)	Cui Jie	13.900		13.500	13.534	219.205
3rd place, bronze medalist(s)	Tan Jiaxin	14.700	13.167		11.834	219.205
3rd place, bronze medalist(s)	Xie Yufen		14.000	12.800		219.205
4	Zhejiang	53.969 (5)	55.035 (3)	53.002 (4)	52.601 (4)	214.607
4	Lv Jiaqi	13.434	13.467	13.467	13.400	214.607
4	Yuan Xiaoyang	13.834	12.267	13.767	13.034	214.607
4	Huang Huidan	12.400	15.267	13.434	13.067	214.607
4	Wang Wei	13.534		12.334	13.100	214.607
4	Luo Huan		14.034	12.000		214.607
4	Jiang Yuyuan	13.167	11.800		12.400	214.607
5	Beijing	53.801 (6)	51.535 (6)	50.935 (7)	50.235 (7)	206.506
5	Wang Yan	13.667	12.234	14.234	13.234	206.506
5	He Kexin	13.534	15.100		12.767	206.506
5	Song Yuxuan	12.300	10.867	11.934	12.300	206.506
5	Niu Sizhuo		12.367	12.300	11.934	206.506
5	Li Yiting	14.300	11.834			206.506
5	Wu Xinghui			12.467		206.506
6	Hubei	52.900 (7)	48.902 (7)	52.401 (5)	50.635 (5)	204.838
6	Zhang Yelinzi	13.700	12.200	13.200	13.134	204.838
6	Mei Jie	13.100	13.034	12.567	13.067	204.838
6	He Chuchu	13.700	11.134	12.900	12.167	204.838
6	Tao Yebaihe	12.400	11.934	12.467	12.267	204.838
6	Zhang Qing			13.734	11.934	204.838
6	Wang Xing	12.034	11.734			204.838
7	Fujian	54.835 (4)	48.768 (8)	51.135 (6)	49.735 (8)	204.473
7	Yao Jinnan	14.434	14.967	14.367	13.700	204.473
7	Chen Siyi	13.567	12.734	13.234	11.934	204.473
7	Huang Peijun	13.834	10.100	11.334	11.834	204.473
7	Wu Chenlu	13.000	9.334	11.567	12.267	204.473
7	Zheng Lin			11.967	11.300	204.473
7	Yu Yanfang	12.000	10.967			204.473
8	Anhui	52.235 (8)	51.634 (5)	48.334 (10)	48.068 (12)	200.271
8	Deng Linlin	13.767	12.700	13.834	13.234	200.271
8	Li Manyu	12.834	11.800	11.200	11.334	200.271
8	Huang Jing	13.434	11.667	11.300	12.400	200.271
8	Zhuang Jinhui		13.600	12.000	11.100	200.271
8	Zhuang Jinlin	12.200	13.534			200.271
8	Yan Ran	12.100		10.467	10.900	200.271

=== Women's All-Around Final ===
Rank	Gymnast	Team	Vault (gymnastics)	Uneven bars	Balance beam	Floor (gymnastics)	Total
1st place, gold medalist(s)	Yao Jinnan	Fujian	14.567	14.700	13.567	13.867	56.701
2nd place, silver medalist(s)	Shang Chunsong	Hunan	13.634	14.834	13.367	13.800	55.635
3rd place, bronze medalist(s)	Zeng Siqi	Hunan	13.634	13.367	14.500	13.834	55.335
4	Tan Sixin	Shanghai		13.300	14.867		54.001
5	Huang Qiushuang	Guangdong	13.634	13.434			53.535
6	Liu Tingting	Guangdong		13.267	13.600		53.534
7	Huang Huidan	Zhejiang					53.468
8	Xiao Kangjun	Shanghai					52.801
9	Zhu Siyan	Zhejiang					52.568
10	Wang Yan	Beijing					52.401
11	Mei Jie	Hubei					52.201
12	Li Shanshan	Hebei					51.702

=== Vault ===
Rank	Gymnast	Team	Total
1st place, gold medalist(s)	Yuan Xiaoyang	Zhejiang	13.750
2nd place, silver medalist(s)	Yang Pei	Shaanxi	13.734
3rd place, bronze medalist(s)	Deng Yalan	Jiangxi	13.667
4	Li Yiting	Beijing	13.500
5	Yang Tianyi	Shanghai	13.467
6	Li Yiwei	Henan	13.367
7	Xiao Ziqian	Guangdong	13.300
8	Jiang Tong	Tianjin	6.417

=== Uneven Bars ===
Rank	Gymnast	Team	D Score	E Score	Pen.	Total
1st place, gold medalist(s)	Huang Huidan	Zhejiang	6.6	8.534		15.134
2nd place, silver medalist(s)	He Kexin	Beijing	6.8	8.200		15.000
3rd place, bronze medalist(s)	Yao Jinnan	Fujian	6.5	8.467		14.967
4	Wu Liufang	Guangdong	6.4	8.234		14.634
5	Fan Yilin	Shanghai	6.3	7.834		14.134
6	Xiao Kangjun	Shanghai	6.3	7.367		13.967
7	Huang Qiushuang	Guangdong	6.2	7.134		13.334
8	Luo Huan	Zhejiang	6.0	7.200		13.200

=== Balance Beam ===
Rank	Gymnast	Team	D Score	E Score	Pen.	Total
1st place, gold medalist(s)	Shang Chunsong	Hunan	6.2	8.467		14.667
2nd place, silver medalist(s)	Deng Linlin	Anhui	6.0	8.543		14.543
3rd place, bronze medalist(s)	Tan Sixin	Shanghai	6.3	8.200		14.500
4	Wang Yan	Beijing	6.3	8.100		14.400
5	Yao Jinnan	Fujian	5.9	8.334		14.234
6	Sui Lu	Shanghai	6.2	7.700		13.900
7	Zeng Siqi	Hunan	6.4	7.167		13.567
8	Liu Tingting	Guangdong	5.2	7.500		12.700

=== Floor Exercise ===
Rank	Gymnast	Team	D Score	E Score	Pen.	Total
1st place, gold medalist(s)	Sui Lu	Shanghai	5.6	8.567		14.167
1st place, gold medalist(s)	Shang Chunsong	Hunan	6.0	8.167		14.167
3rd place, bronze medalist(s)	Yao Jinnan	Fujian	5.5	8.634		14.134
4	Zeng Siqi	Hunan	5.3	8.634		13.934
5	Liu Tingting	Guangdong	5.1	8.500		13.600
6	Lv Jiaqi	Zhejiang	5.2	8.367		13.567
7	Tan Sixin	Shanghai	5.1	7.667		12.767
8	Xu Chujun	Guangdong	5.2	6.834		12.034

== Medal count ==
Rank	Nation	Gold	Silver	Bronze	Total
1	Shanghai	3	1	1	5
2	Hunan	2	1	2	5
3	Guangdong	2	1	0	3
4	Zhejiang	2	0	0	2
5	Fujian	1	2	3	6
6	Guizhou	1	2	1	4
7	Beijing	1	2	0	3
8	PLA	1	1	0	2
9	Jiangsu	1	0	0	1
9	Shanxi	1	0	0	1
11	Jiangxi	0	1	1	2
12	Anhui	0	1	0	1
12	Shaanxi	0	1	0	1
14	Tianjin	0	0	3	3
15	Guangxi	0	0	1	1
15	Shandong	0	0	1	1
15	Sichuan	0	0	1	1
Totals (17 entries)		15	13	14	42
