= 2012 Chinese Artistic Gymnastics Championships =

- Location: (China) Shanghai
- Start date: May 8, 2012
- End date: May 12, 2012

The 2012 Chinese Artistic Gymnastics Championships were held from 8 May to 12 May 2012 in Shanghai.

== Men's event medal winners ==
Event	Gold	Silver	Bronze
Team	Guizhou	Guangdong	Jiangsu
All-around	Guo Weiyang	Huang Yuguo	Teng Haibin
Floor	Zou Kai	Zhang Chenglong	Cheng Ran; Zheng Shudi
Pommel horse	Xiao Qin	Zhang Hongtao	Fu Yu; You Hao
Rings	Chen Yibing	Liao Junlin	Luo Xuan
Vault	Xue Ruiyang	Luo Zepeng	Cao Yulong
Parallel bars	Feng Zhe	Wang Guanyin	Teng Haibin
Horizontal bar	Zou Kai	Zhang Chenglong	Zhou Shixiong

== Women's event medal winners ==
Event	Gold	Silver	Bronze
Team	Shanghai	Guangdong	Hunan
All Around	Deng Linlin	Jiang Yuyuan	Tan Sixin; Shang Chunsong
Vault	Cheng Fei	Li Yiting	Yang Pei
Uneven Bars	He Kexin	Huang Huidan	Tan Jiaxin
Balance Beam	Tan Sixin	Zeng Siqi	Sui Lu
Floor	Sui Lu	Tan Sixin	Cheng Fei

=== Team ===
Rank	Team	Total
1st place, gold medalist(s)	Shanghai	221.400
2nd place, silver medalist(s)	Guangdong	213.850
3rd place, bronze medalist(s)	Hunan	213.450
4	Zhejiang	212.750
5	Hubei	209.600
6	Anhui	200.550
7	Beijing	199.400
8	Sichuan	199.000

=== All-around ===
Rank	Gymnast	Team	Vault (gymnastics)	Uneven bars	Balance beam	Floor (gymnastics)	Total
1st place, gold medalist(s)	Deng Linlin	Anhui	14.100	13.950	14.350	14.150	56.550
2nd place, silver medalist(s)	Jiang Yuyuan	Zhejiang	13.800	14.700	13.850	13.750	56.100
3rd place, bronze medalist(s)	Tan Sixin	Shanghai	13.450	14.400	14.450	13.300	55.600
3rd place, bronze medalist(s)	Shang Chunsong	Hunan	13.400	14.350	14.000	13.850	55.600
5	Huang Qiushuang	Guangdong	14.500	12.900	13.650	14.000	55.050
6	Liu Zhilin	Hubei					52.400
7	Luo Peiru	Guangdong	13.250	14.550	11.850	12.650	52.300
8	Xiao Kangjun	Shanghai	13.700	12.400	12.800	13.250	52.150

=== Vault ===
Rank	Gymnast	Team	D Score	E Score	Pen.	Score 1	D Score	E Score	Pen.	Score 2	Total
1st place, gold medalist(s)	Cheng Fei	Hubei	5.8	8.850		14.650	5.6	9.075		14.675	14.662
2nd place, silver medalist(s)	Li Yiting	Beijing	6.0	8.525		14.525	6.3	8.300		14.600	14.562
3rd place, bronze medalist(s)	Yang Pei	Shaanxi	6.0	8.225		14.225	6.3	8.025		14.325	14.275
4	Jiang Tong	Tianjin	5.3	8.525		13.825	5.6	8.300		13.900	13.862
5	Yuan Xiaoyang	Zhejiang	5.2	8.225		13.425	5.0	8.475		13.475	13.450
6	Wang Xin	Beijing	4.6	8.100		12.700	5.8	8.075		13.875	13.287
7	Wong Hiu Ying Angel	Hong Kong	5.2	8.150		13.350	5.9	7.275		13.175	13.262
8	He Chuchu	Hubei	5.0	8.125		13.125	5.8	7.200		13.000	13.062

=== Uneven bars ===
Rank	Gymnast	Team	D Score	E Score	Pen.	Total
1st place, gold medalist(s)	He Kexin	Beijing	7.1	8.550		15.650
2nd place, silver medalist(s)	Huang Huidan	Zhejiang	6.6	7.575		14.175
3rd place, bronze medalist(s)	Tan Jiaxin	Hunan	6.1	7.950		14.050
4	Jiang Yuyuan	Zhejiang	6.2	7.650		13.850
5	Tan Sixin	Shanghai	6.4	7.200		13.600
6	Xiao Kangjun	Shanghai	6.5	7.000		13.500
7	Wu Liufang	Guangdong	6.6	6.025		12.625
8	Shang Chunsong	Hunan	6.2	6.250		12.450

=== Balance beam ===
Rank	Gymnast	Team	D Score	E Score	Pen.	Total
1st place, gold medalist(s)	Tan Sixin	Shanghai	6.3	8.550		14.850
2nd place, silver medalist(s)	Zeng Siqi	Hunan	6.4	8.275		14.675
3rd place, bronze medalist(s)	Sui Lu	Shanghai	6.5	7.950		14.450
4	Huang Qiushuang	Guangdong	5.5	8.075		13.575
5	Shang Chunsong	Hunan	6.3	6.775		13.075
6	Lou Nina	Zhejiang	6.1	6.575		12.675
7	Xie Biying	Henan	5.5	6.925		12.425
8	Wu Liufang	Guangdong	5.1	6.900		12.000

=== Floor exercise ===
Rank	Gymnast	Team	D Score	E Score	Pen.	Total
1st place, gold medalist(s)	Sui Lu	Shanghai	5.7	8.225	0.1	13.825
2nd place, silver medalist(s)	Tan Sixin	Shanghai	5.5	8.200		13.700
3rd place, bronze medalist(s)	Cheng Fei	Hubei	5.4	8.325	0.1	13.625
4	Deng Linlin	Anhui	5.4	8.200		13.600
4	Shang Chunsong	Hunan	5.7	7.900		13.600
6	Jiang Tong	Tianjin	5.4	7.900		13.300
7	Zhang Jing	Hubei	5.4	7.825	0.1	13.125
8	Lou Nina	Zhejiang	5.4	7.55		12.950
