= 2011 Chinese Artistic Gymnastics Championships =

- Location: (China) Kunshan, Zhejiang
- Start date: May 8, 2011
- End date: May 12, 2011

The 2011 Chinese Artistic Gymnastics Championships were held from 8 May to 12 May 2011 in Kunshan, Zhejiang.

== Men's Event Medal Winners ==
Event	Gold	Silver	Bronze
Team	Jiangsu	Guangdong	PLA
All-around	Guo Weiyang; Teng Haibin	not awarded	Lü Bo
Floor	Zhang Chenglong	Zou Kai	Du Wei
Pommel horse	Zhang Hongtao	Xiao Qin	Guo Weiyang
Rings	Chen Yibing; Yan Mingyong	not awarded	Liao Junlin
Vault	Zhang Zhongbo	Feng Zhe	Lü Bo
Parallel bars	Feng Zhe	Teng Haibin	Guo Weiyang
Horizontal bar	Zou Kai	Liu Rongbing	Lü Junhai

== Women's Event Medal Winners ==
Event	Gold	Silver	Bronze
Team	Shanghai	Zhejiang	Guangdong
All-around	Tan Sixin	Yao Jinnan	Zeng Siqi
Vault	Li Yiting	Cheng Fei	Jiang Tong
Uneven Bars	He Kexin	Yao Jinnan	Huang Huidan
Balance Beam	Sui Lu	Zeng Siqi	Zhang Yelinzi
Floor	Sui Lu	Zeng Siqi	Yao Jinnan
