= 2016 Chinese Artistic Gymnastics Championships =

Gymnastics competition in Hefei, Anhui, China

- Location: (China) Hefei, Anhui
- Start date: 11 May 2016
- End date: 15 May 2016

The 2016 Chinese Artistic Gymnastics Championships were held from 11-15 May 2016 in Hefei, Anhui.

== Medalists ==
Event	Gold	Silver	Bronze
Men
Team	Guizhou	Guangdong	Jiangsu
All-around	Lin Chaopan (Fujian)	Deng Shudi (Guizhou)	Liu Rongbing (Guizhou)
Floor exercise	Deng Shudi (Guizhou)	Mu Jile (Tianjin)	Wang Haoran (Shandong)
Pommel horse	Weng Hao (Jiangsu)	Zou Jingyuan (Sichuan)	He Yunlong (PLA)
Rings	Liu Yang (PLA)	You Hao (Jiangsu)	Liao Junlin (Guangxi)
Vault	Qu Ruiyang (Hunan)	Wang Haoran (Shandong)	Luo Zepeng (Sichuan)
Parallel bars	Lin Chaopan (Fujian)	Zhou Shixiong (Guangdong)	Liu Rongbing (Guizhou)
Horizontal bar	Zhang Chenglong (Shandong)	Lin Chaopan (Fujian)	Liu Rongbing (Guizhou)
Women
Team	Hunan; Shang Chunsong; Tan Jiaxin; Xie Yufen; Wang Cenyu; Luo Youjuan; Chen Xiaoqing	Guangdong; Liu Tingting; Zhu Xiaofang; Hong Ke; Chen Yile; Xu Chujun; Liu Jingxing	Shanghai; Fan Yilin; Mao Yi; Zhang Jin; Xu Li; Yang Tianyi; Tang Weiwei
All-around	Shang Chunsong (Hunan)	Mao Yi (Shanghai)	Liu Tingting (Guangdong)
Vault	Yuan Xiaoyang (Zhejiang)	Liu Jinru (Henan)	Jing Yang (Beijing)
Uneven bars	Fan Yilin (Shanghai)	Tan Jiaxin (Hunan)	Huang Huidan (Zhejiang)
Balance beam	Shang Chunsong (Hunan)	Liu Tingting (Guangdong)	Chen Xiaoqing (Hunan)
Floor exercise	Shang Chunsong (Hunan)	Mao Yi (Shanghai)	Li Qi (Zhejiang)

== Women's results ==
=== Team ===
Rank	Team	Vault (gymnastics)	Uneven bars	Balance beam	Floor (gymnastics)	Total
1st place, gold medalist(s)	Hunan	56.700	59.050	57.900	54.850	228.500
1st place, gold medalist(s)	Shang Chunsong	14.050	15.600	15,400	15.150	228.500
1st place, gold medalist(s)	Xie Yufen	13.550	14.800	13.350	12.400	228.500
1st place, gold medalist(s)	Wang Cenyu	12.550	13.750	14.100	11.350	228.500
1st place, gold medalist(s)	Tan Jiaxin	15.350	14.900		14.150	228.500
1st place, gold medalist(s)	Luo Youjuan	13.750		14.300		228.500
1st place, gold medalist(s)	Chen Xiaoqing		12.900	14.100	13.150	228.500
2nd place, silver medalist(s)	Guangdong	57.200	57.300	55.900	53.700	224.100
2nd place, silver medalist(s)	Chen Yile	14.050	13.500	12.950		224.100
2nd place, silver medalist(s)	Zhu Xiaofang	13.700	15.050	14.050	13.450	224.100
2nd place, silver medalist(s)	Liu Tingting	14.950	15.350	14.650	14.050	224.100
2nd place, silver medalist(s)	Liu Jingxing		13.400	13.850	12.800	224.100
2nd place, silver medalist(s)	Hong Ke	14.500	11.700		12.900	224.100
2nd place, silver medalist(s)	Xu Chujun	13.700		13.350	13.300	224.100
3rd place, bronze medalist(s)	Shanghai	57.800	55.650	54.900	54.750	223.100
3rd place, bronze medalist(s)	Fan Yilin		14.800	15.300	13.500	223.100
3rd place, bronze medalist(s)	Zhang Jin	15.000	12.700	12.150	13.350	223.100
3rd place, bronze medalist(s)	Xu Li	12.650	13.300	12.500	12.650	223.100
3rd place, bronze medalist(s)	Yang Tianyi	14.800			12.200	223.100
3rd place, bronze medalist(s)	Mao Yi	15.350	13.850	13.900	15.250	223.100
3rd place, bronze medalist(s)	Tang Weiwei	11.650	13.700	13.200		223.100
4	Beijing	59.250	54.650	53.750	54.150	221.800
4	Fu Xiaqiuran	12.550	13.150	12.950	13.050	221.800
4	Wang Yan	15.350	13.800	14.500	15.050	221.800
4	Yang Haimeng	14.600			12.800	221.800
4	Du Siyu	14.000	14.860	10.950		221.800
4	Jing Yang	15.300	12.150	12.200	13.200	221.800
4	Lin Yuyao		12.850	14.100	12.850	221.800
4	Zhejiang	57.350	57.050	54.750	52.650	221.800
4	Hua Ruixue	13.700	14.350		12.650	221.800
4	Yuan Xiaoyang	15.100		13.550	13.200	221.800
4	Li Qi	14.650	13.400	13.900	13.700	221.800
4	Luo Huan	13.900	14.200	13.900	12.950	221.800
4	Lyu Jiaqi	13.600	13.850	12.500		221.800
4	Huang Huidan		14.650	13.400	12.800	221.800
6	Henan	55.350	51.900	54.550	53.450	215.250
6	Wu Ziyue		11.750	11.250		215.250
6	Liu Jinru	15.000	13.100	13.000	13.600	215.250
6	Lu Yufei		13.600	13.600	14.100	215.250
6	Xiao Jiale	13.050		13.650	12.650	215.250
6	Zhou Lu	13.700	13.450	14.300	13.100	215.250
6	Jiang Shiqi	13.600	11.750		12.300	215.250
7	Hubei	57.350	49.350	46.100	51.500	204.300
7	Zhang Jin	12.150	11.550	11.000	12.650	204.300
7	Chen Yongdie		11.450	12.100		204.300
7	Liu Jieyu	14.850	13.050	10.650	13.400	204.300
7	Wu Jing	15.100	10.600		12.250	204.300
7	Gong Kangyi	13.650		12.200	13.200	204.300
7	Guo Fangting	13.750	13.300	10.800	10.400	204.300
8	Fujian	53.950	47.000	49.450	52.250	202.650
8	Chen Siyi	13.900		13.750	13.300	202.650
8	Yao Jinnan	12.850		12.150	13.000	202.650
8	Cai Mengjie	13.650	11.600	11.700	13.250	202.650
8	Tao Siyan	13.550	12.550	11.850	12.700	202.650
8	Yu Yanfang	12.400	12.300	11.300		202.650
8	Zheng Lin		10.550		12.550	202.650
9	Hebei	51.950	46.650	52.600	49.800	201.000
9	Li Hairuo	12.800	11.300	13.400	12.900	201.000
9	Chen Jiaqi	13.950	12.700	13.500	12.850	201.000
9	Wu Mengyao	12.600	12.700	13.150	11.600	201.000
9	Zhang Wenxin	12.600	9.950	12.550	12.450	201.000
10	Guangxi	51.700	47.550	50.100	50.300	199.650
10	Wei Ruitong	11.300	12.200	9.600		199.650
10	Bai Yawen	12.400	11.200	13.900	13.150	199.650
10	Tian Xinyu	13.150	11.300	11.800	12.350	199.650
10	Tan Ziyi	12.900	11.700	12.300	12.500	199.650
10	Liang Wenqi	13.250	12.350	12.100	12.300	199.650

=== All-around ===
Rank	Gymnast	Team	Vault (gymnastics)	Uneven bars	Balance beam	Floor (gymnastics)	Total
1st place, gold medalist(s)	Shang Chunsong	Hunan	13.800	15.400	15.500	14.850	59.550
2nd place, silver medalist(s)	Mao Yi	Shanghai	15.400	13.050	14.450	15.200	58.100
3rd place, bronze medalist(s)	Liu Tingting	Guangdong	14.100	15.300	14.300	14.250	57.950
4	Wang Yan	Beijing	15.150	13.750	13.950	15.000	57.850
5	Luo Huan	Zhejiang	13.950	14.700	14.350	13.450	56.450
6	Li Qi	Zhejiang	14.000	13.250	13.350	13.900	54.500
7	Liu Jinru	Henan	15.200	13.200	12.900	13.150	54.450
8	Zhu Xiaofang	Guangdong	12.950	13.800	13.550	13.650	53.950
9	Zhou Lu	Henan	13.700	13.500	13.450	13.150	53.800
10	Zhang Jin	Shanghai	14.300	13.550	12.400	13.150	53.400
11	Chen Jiaqi	Hebei	13.750	12.850	12.950	12.750	52.300
12	Tao Siyan	Fujian	13.650	13.250	11.900	12.950	51.750
13	Li Hairuo	Hebei	12.650	12.500	13.950	12.600	51.700
14	Wang Cenyu	Hunan	12.550	13.800	12.950	12.250	51.550
15	Fu Xiaqiuran	Beijing	12.550	12.550	12.950	12.600	50.650
16	Zhou Linlin	Jiangsu	12.500	13.000	12.900	12.150	50.550
17	Wu Hongping	Anhui	13.700	12.500	11.550	12.700	50.450
18	Liu Jieyu	Hubei	13.700	11.750	12.400	12.450	50.300
19	Liang Wenqi	Guangxi	13.050	12.500	12.350	12.250	50.150
20	Zhao Yanan	Shanxi	13.700	11.700	11.750	12.850	50.000
21	Wang Xinyu	Sichuan	13.500	12.850	12.450	10.700	49.500
22	Cai Mengjie	Fujian	13.550	11.700	10.300	12.600	48.150
23	Zhou Jie	Jiangsu	11.350	11.600	12.500	11.750	47.200
24	Yao Shunyu	Shaanxi	13.950	10.400	11.100	10.450	45.900

=== Vault ===
Rank	Gymnast	Team	D Score	E Score	Pen.	Score 1	D Score	E Score	Pen.	Score 2	Total
1st place, gold medalist(s)	Yuan Xiaoyang	Zhejiang	6.0+0.3	9.067		15.367	6.2+0.3	9.034		15.534	15.450
2nd place, silver medalist(s)	Liu Jinru	Henan	6.0+0.3	8.734		15.034	6.2+0.3	8.700		15.200	15.117
3rd place, bronze medalist(s)	Jing Yang	Beijing	5.0	8.667		13.667	6.0+0.3	8.734		15.034	14.350
4	Gong Yuhan	Shandong	5.2	8.600		13.800	5.0	8.767	0.3	13.767	13.784
5	Yao Shunyu	Shaanxi	5.2	8.867		14.067	5.0	8.500	0.1	13.400	13.734
6	Tie Jiayi	Shaanxi	5.2	8.034	0.1	13.134	5.0	8.667		13.667	13.400
7	Pan Yuting	Shandong	4.2	8.400		12.600	5.0	7.500	0.1	12.400	12.500
8	Zhang Zhenmei	Hong Kong	4.0	8.434		12.434	3.2	8.634		11.834	12.134
Rank	Gymnast	Team	Vault 1				Vault 2				Total

=== Uneven bars ===
Rank	Gymnast	Team	D Score	E Score	Pen.	Total
1st place, gold medalist(s)	Fan Yilin	Shanghai	7.0+0.1	8.734		15.834
2nd place, silver medalist(s)	Tan Jiaxin	Hunan	6.8+0.1	8.500		15.400
3rd place, bronze medalist(s)	Huang Huidan	Zhejiang	6.5+0.2	8.467		15.167
4	Shang Chunsong	Hunan	6.7	8.434		15.134
5	Liu Tingting	Guangdong	6.3+0.1	8.467		14.867
6	Du Siyu	Beijing	6.5+0.1	8.200		14.800
7	Zhu Xiaofang	Guangdong	6.2	8.567		14.767
8	Hua Ruixue	Zhejiang	5.7	8.334		14.034

=== Balance beam ===
Rank	Gymnast	Team	D Score	E Score	Pen.	Total
1st place, gold medalist(s)	Shang Chunsong	Hunan	6.7+0.3	8.467		15.467
2nd place, silver medalist(s)	Liu Tingting	Guangdong	6.3	8.634		14.934
3rd place, bronze medalist(s)	Chen Xiaoqing	Hunan	5.9	8.5		14.400
4	Zhou Lu	Henan	5.8	8.434		14.234
5	Lin Yuyao	Beijing	5.7+0.1	8.334		14.134
6	Fan Yilin	Shanghai	6.4+0.2	7.367		13.967
7	Zhu Xiaofang	Guangdong	5.8	8.034		13.834
8	Wang Yan	Beijing	6.3+0.2	6.167		12.667

=== Floor exercise ===
Rank	Gymnast	Team	D Score	E Score	Pen.	Total
1st place, gold medalist(s)	Shang Chunsong	Hunan	6.6+0.3	8.200		15.100
2nd place, silver medalist(s)	Mao Yi	Shanghai	6.0+0.2	8.234		14.434
3rd place, bronze medalist(s)	Li Qi	Zhejiang	5.9+0.2	8.267		14.367
4	Lu Yufei	Henan	5.8+0.1	8.267		14.167
5	Liu Tingting	Guangdong	5.5	8.534		14.034
6	Liu Jinru	Henan	5.9+0.1	7.900		13.900
7	Tan Jiaxin	Hunan	5.8	7.967		13.767
8	Wang Yan	Beijing	6.1+0.4	7.167		13.667
