= 2015 Chinese Artistic Gymnastics Championships =

Gymnastics competition in China

- Location: (China) Fuzhou, Fujian
- Start date: 1 June 2015
- End date: 4 June 2015

The 2015 Chinese Artistic Gymnastics Championships were held from 1-4 June 2015 in Fuzhou, Fujian.

== Medalists ==
Event	Gold	Silver	Bronze
Men
Team	Guizhou	Guangdong	People's Liberation Army
All Around	Deng Shudi (Guizhou)	Zhou Shixiong (Guangdong)	Lin Chaopan (Fujian)
Floor	Lin Chaopan (Fujian)	Wei Xin (Shanxi)	Deng Shudi (Guizhou)
Pommel horse	Xiao Ruoteng (PLA)	Chen Xuezhang (Fujian)	Deng Shudi (Guizhou)
Rings	Liu Yang (PLA)	Lei Peng (Shanghai)	You Hao (Jiangsu)
Vault	Qu Ruiyang (Hunan)	Huang Mingqi (Guangxi)	Cheng Ran (Beijing)
Parallel bars	Zhou Shixiong (Guangdong); He Youxiao (Shanghai)		Lin Chaopan (Fujian)
Horizontal bar	Xiao Ruoteng (PLA)	Zhang Chenglong (Shandong)	Sun Wei (Jiangsu)
Women
Team	Shang Chunsong; Tan Jiaxin; Xie Yufen; Wang Cenyu; Luo Youjuan; Chen Xiaoqing (Hunan)	Fan Yilin; Mao Yi; Zhang Jin; Xu Li; Yang Tianyi; Zhang Ziwen (Shanghai)	Liu Tingting; Zhu Xiaofang; Hong Ke; Chen Li; Xu Chujun; Liu Jingxing (Guangdong)
All Around	Shang Chunsong (Hunan)	Wang Yan (Beijing)	Chen Siyi (Fujian)
Vault	Wang Yan (Beijing)	Li Linxi (Tianjin)	Liu Jinru (Henan)
Uneven Bars	Fan Yilin (Shanghai)	Huang Huidan (Zhejiang)	Zhu Xiaofang (Guangdong)
Balance Beam	Shang Chunsong (Hunan)	Luo Youjuan (Hunan)	Fan Yilin (Shanghai)
Floor	Wang Yan (Beijing)	Shang Chunsong (Hunan)	Luo Huan (Zhejiang)

== Women's results ==
=== Team ===
Rank	Team	Vault (gymnastics)	Uneven bars	Balance beam	Floor (gymnastics)	Total
1st place, gold medalist(s)	Hunan	55.450	55.950	56.050	51.900	219.350
1st place, gold medalist(s)	Shang Chunsong	13.650	14.050	14.800	13.650	219.350
1st place, gold medalist(s)	Xie Yufen	13.350	14.500	13.550	12.600	219.350
1st place, gold medalist(s)	Wang Cenyu	13.450	11.350	13.650	12.500	219.350
1st place, gold medalist(s)	Tan Jiaxin	14.700	14.950		12.900	219.350
1st place, gold medalist(s)	Luo Youjuan	13.650		14.050	12.900	219.350
1st place, gold medalist(s)	Chen Xiaoqing		12.450	12.800		219.350
2nd place, silver medalist(s)	Shanghai	54.950	55.400	54.800	53.600	218.750
2nd place, silver medalist(s)	Mao Yi	13.900	13.450	14.000	14.300	218.750
2nd place, silver medalist(s)	Xu Li	13.500	13.400	13.150	13.450	218.750
2nd place, silver medalist(s)	Fan Yilin		15.000	13.950	13.050	218.750
2nd place, silver medalist(s)	Zhang Jin	13.100		13.700	12.800	218.750
2nd place, silver medalist(s)	Yang Tianyi	14.450	11.700		11.850	218.750
2nd place, silver medalist(s)	Zhang Ziwen	12.250	13.550	12.000		218.750
3rd place, bronze medalist(s)	Guangdong	55.100	53.700	54.800	53.050	216.650
3rd place, bronze medalist(s)	Liu Tingting	14.600	14.650	13.550	13.550	216.650
3rd place, bronze medalist(s)	Zhu Xiaofang	13.500	14.450	14.200	13.150	216.650
3rd place, bronze medalist(s)	Hong Ke	13.400	10.050	12.900	10.800	216.650
3rd place, bronze medalist(s)	Xu Chujun	13.600		13.950	13.300	216.650
3rd place, bronze medalist(s)	Liu Jingxing	13.300	11.900	13.100		216.650
3rd place, bronze medalist(s)	Chen Li		12.700		13.050	216.650
4	Zhejiang	53.000	53.500	51.950	51.500	209.950
4	Luo Huan	13.650	13.650	13.600	13.250	209.950
4	Yuan Xiaoyang	13.500	12.250	12.950	12.750	209.950
4	Hu Mengyao	12.500	12.400	10.400	12.500	209.950
4	Huang Huidan		13.850	13.550	12.950	209.950
4	Lou Nina	13.350			12.250	209.950
4	Lyu Jiaqi		13.600	11.850		209.950
5	Beijing	53.800	50.500	53.750	49.800	207.850
5	Wang Yan	15.100	13.300	14.050	14.200	207.850
5	Lin Yuyao	12.900	12.450	13.750	12.200	207.850
5	Niu Sizhuo	11.450	12.550	12.900	12.150	207.850
5	Jing Yang	13.500	12.200	11.850	11.250	207.850
5	Yuan Jiahe	12.300	11.350	13.050	11.050	207.850
6	Henan	55.850	49.250	49.850	47.800	202.750
6	Lu Yufei	13.500	13.850	12.750	12.850	202.750
6	Zhou Lu	12.500	12.650	12.800	12.350	202.750
6	Liu Jinru	15.000	11.200	11.750	11.500	202.750
6	Xiao Jiale	12.550	11.550	12.550	11.100	202.750
6	Li Yiwei	14.800		10.600	11.100	202.750
7	Fujian	52.650	49.800	47.400	50.800	200.650
7	Chen Siyi	14.650	13.600	14.200	13.100	200.650
7	Tao Siyan	12.400	12.600	11.250	12.400	200.650
7	Yu Yanfang	12.450	11.600	10.400	12.000	200.650
7	Cai Mengjie	13.150	11.500		12.450	200.650
7	Zheng Lin		12.000	10.900	12.850	200.650
7	Cheng Wenlong	12.400		11.050		200.650
8	Hubei	52.050	48.350	50.800	47.150	198.350
8	Gong Kangyi	12.450	12.000	13.350	12.750	198.350
8	Zhang Jin	13.300	11.200	12.600	11.850	198.350
8	Chen Yongdie	12.150	12.250	11.300	11.800	198.350
8	Chen Zhaohui	12.650	12.300	11.650	10.750	198.350
8	Wu Jing	13.650	11.800	13.200		198.350
8	Mei Jie				10.750	198.350
9	Guangxi	51.750	43.350	47.400	47.650	190.150
9	Bai Yawen	13.450	9.800	13.450	12.100	190.150
9	Liang Wenqi	12.700	11.100	10.550	12.250	190.150
9	Wei Ruitong	13.250	11.950	12.200		190.150
9	Huang Ruotong	12.350	10.500		11.650	190.150
9	Lu Qiuying			11.200	11.650	190.150
10	Jiangsu	48.950	41.050	45.850	45.950	181.800
10	Zhou Linlin	13.250	12.500	12.900	11.800	181.800
10	Lin Yitong	12.400	10.500	11.000	11.600	181.800
10	Li Ziqi	12.400	10.550	11.150	11.200	181.800
10	Qin Chang	10.900		10.800	11.350	181.800
10	Zhou Jie		7.500	9.950	9.750	181.800
-	Individual qualifications					
-	Li Linxi (Tianjin)	14.850	12.150	9.700	11.800	48.500
-	Fu Yuyao (Sichuan)	12.400	12.700	11.500	11.800	48.400
-	Wang Qianmei (Yunnan)	12.700	12.000	12.200	11.150	48.050
-	Li Yanye (Tianjin)	13.100	9.850	11.600	11.800	46.350
-	Yao Shunyu (Shaanxi)	13.700	9.950	10.550	11.800	46.000
-	Lin Jinyu (Jiangxi)	12.300	8.800	11.450	12.000	44.550
-	Yang Shuoxuan (Hebei)	11.700	9.900	11.400	11.200	44.200
-	Zhang Yuxin (Shaanxi)	12.650	9.550	9.950	11.650	43.800
-	Yang Yu (Jiangxi)	12.000	10.400	9.500	10.600	42.500
-	Wang Jiayi (Jiangxi)	12.100	10.050	10.200	10.100	42.450
-	Zhao Wei (Anhui)	12.050	10.050	8.050	11.850	42.000
-	陳芷芯 (Hong Kong)	12.650	9.050	8.700	9.900	40.300
-	梁嘉雯 (Hong Kong)	12.000		9.000		21.000
-	Wang Jiayi (Jiangxi)		9.600			9.600

=== All-around ===
Rank	Gymnast	Team	Vault (gymnastics)	Uneven bars	Balance beam	Floor (gymnastics)	Total
1st place, gold medalist(s)	Shang Chunsong	Hunan	13.100	15.300	14.150	14.550	57.100
2nd place, silver medalist(s)	Wang Yan	Beijing	14.900	13.350	13.450	13.800	55.500
3rd place, bronze medalist(s)	Chen Siyi	Fujian	14.050	13.750	14.050	13.400	55.250
4	Mao Yi	Shanghai	13.650	13.650	14.050	13.500	54.850
5	Zhu Xiaofang	Guangdong	13.300	14.650	14.000	12.500	54.450
6	Liu Tingting	Guangdong	14.400	14.900	11.800	13.200	54.300
7	Luo Huan	Zhejiang	13.600	14.000	12.950	13.650	54.200
8	Bai Yawen	Guangxi	13.300	12.650	14.400	12.750	53.100
9	Liu Jinru	Henan	14.850	11.450	13.300	13.200	52.800
10	Lu Yufei	Henan	12.650	14.650	12.900	12.400	52.600
11	Zhou Linlin	Jiangsu	13.050	13.850	13.700	11.800	52.400
12	Xie Yufen	Hunan	13.300	14.500	11.950	12.400	52.150
13	Xu Li	Shanghai	13.200	11.250	13.800	13.050	51.300
14	Lin Yuyao	Beijing	12.050	12.550	13.800	11.400	49.800
15	Li Yanye	Tianjin	13.000	12.100	11.450	12.900	49.450
16	Liang Wenqi	Guangxi	12.500	11.600	11.900	12.400	48.400
17	Gong Kangyi	Hubei	12.350	11.000	13.800	10.600	47.750
18	Yang Shuoxuan	Hebei	12.100	10.200	12.800	12.400	47.500
19	Zhang Yuxin	Shaanxi	12.400	12.000	11.050	11.900	47.350
20	Tao Siyan	Fujian	12.900	11.800	11.750	10.300	46.750
21	Fu Yuyao	Sichuan	12.100	11.950	10.750	11.600	46.400
22	Zhang Jin	Hubei	13.000	11.400	10.450	11.100	45.950
23	Wang Qianmei	Yunnan	12.400	11.800	10.800	10.750	45.750
24	Lin Jinyu	Jiangxi	12.200	8.650	12.250	12.200	45.300

=== Vault ===
Rank	Gymnast	Team	D Score	E Score	Pen.	Score 1	D Score	E Score	Pen.	Score 2	Total
1st place, gold medalist(s)	Wang Yan	Beijing	6.0+0.3	8.767		15.067	6.2+0.3	8.600		15.100	15.084
2nd place, silver medalist(s)	Li Linxi	Tianjin	6.0+0.3	8.500		14.800	6.2+0.3	8.300	0.1	14.700	14.750
3rd place, bronze medalist(s)	Liu Jinru	Henan	6.2+0.3	8.100		14.600	6.0+0.3	8.300		14.600	14.600
4	Li Yiwei	Henan	6.0+0.3	8.400		14.700	6.2+0.3	7.367	0.3	13.567	14.134
5	Yao Shunyu	Shaanxi	5.2	8.333		13.533	5.0	8.267		13.267	13.400
6	Yang Tianyi	Shanghai	5.8+0.2	8.000		14.000	5.0	7.300		12.300	13.150
7	Chan Tsz Sum	Hong Kong	?	?		12.700	5.0	7.367	0.3	12.067	12.384
8	Yuan Xiaoyang	Zhejiang	?	?		10.767	?	?		10.900	10.834
Rank	Gymnast	Team	Vault 1				Vault 2				Total

=== Uneven bars ===
Rank	Gymnast	Team	D Score	E Score	Pen.	Total
1st place, gold medalist(s)	Fan Yilin	Shanghai	6.7+0.1	8.400		15.200
2nd place, silver medalist(s)	Huang Huidan	Zhejiang	6.8+0.1	8.200		15.100
3rd place, bronze medalist(s)	Zhu Xiaofang	Guangdong	6.4	8.300		14.700
4	Xie Yufen	Hunan	6.5	7.867		14.367
5	Tan Jiaxin	Hunan	6.9+0.3	6.900		14.100
6	Lu Yufei	Henan	5.9+0.4	7.567		13.867
7	Luo Huan	Zhejiang	5.5	7.133	0.5	12.133
8	Liu Tingting	Guangdong	6.3	6.000	0.5	11.800

=== Balance beam ===
Rank	Gymnast	Team	D Score	E Score	Pen.	Total
1st place, gold medalist(s)	Shang Chunsong	Hunan	6.1+0.2	8.167		14.467
2nd place, silver medalist(s)	Luo Youjuan	Hunan	6.1	8.167		14.267
3rd place, bronze medalist(s)	Fan Yilin	Shanghai	5.9	7.933		13.833
4	Zhu Xiaofang	Guangdong	5.8	7.967		13.767
5	Wang Yan	Beijing	6.3+0.2	6.667		13.167
6	Chen Siyi	Fujian	6.0+0.3	6.833	0.1	13.033
7	Xu Chujun	Guangdong	5.7	7.000		12.700
8	Mao Yi	Shanghai	5.1	5.033		10.133

=== Floor exercise ===
Rank	Gymnast	Team	D Score	E Score	Pen.	Total
1st place, gold medalist(s)	Wang Yan	Beijing	6.3+0.4	7.767	0.1	14.367
2nd place, silver medalist(s)	Shang Chunsong	Hunan	6.5+0.2	7.733	0.1	14.333
3rd place, bronze medalist(s)	Luo Huan	Zhejiang	5.6	7.833		13.433
4	Chen Siyi	Fujian	5.4+0.1	7.700		13.200
5	Liu Tingting	Guangdong	5.4+0.1	7.700	0.1	13.100
6	Xu Chujun	Guangdong	5.3+0.1	7.567		12.967
7	Xu Li	Shanghai	5.1	7.800		12.900
8	Mao Yi	Shanghai	5.7+0.2	6.367		12.267
