= 2008 Chinese Artistic Gymnastics Championships =

- Location: (China) Tianjin
- Start date: May 07, 2008
- End date: May 11, 2008

The 2008 Chinese Artistic Gymnastics Championships were held from May 7–11, 2008 in Tianjin, China.

== Women's medalists ==
Event	Gold	Silver	Bronze
Team	Guangdong	Shanghai	Beijing
Individual all-around	Jiang Yuyuan	Yang Yilin	Deng Linlin
Vault	Cheng Fei	Deng Shaojie	Deng Linlin
Uneven bars	He Kexin	Yang Yilin	Pang PanPan
Balance beam	Sui Lu	Guo Wei	Zhang Nan
Floor	Cheng Fei Sui Lu	None awarded	Yang Yilin

== Men's medalists ==
Event	Gold	Silver	Bronze
Team	Guangdong	Sichuan	People’s Liberation Army
Individual all-around	Yang Wei	Zou Kai	Teng Haibin
Floor	Zou Kai Liang Fuliang	None awarded	Zhang Chenglong
Pommel horse	Xiao Qin	Zhang Hongtao	Chen Chen
Rings	Chen Yibing Yang Wei	None awarded	Yan Mingyong
Vault	Guo Jiahao	Hu Junjie	Liang Mingsheng
Parallel bars	Huang Xu	Feng Zhe	Yang Wei
Horizontal bar	Zou Kai	Feng Zhe	He Jiajin
