= 2023 Chinese Artistic Gymnastics Championships =

Gymnastics competition in Jinan, Shandong, China

- Location: (China) Jinan, Shandong
- Start date: May 21, 2023
- End date: May 28, 2023

The 2023 Chinese Artistic Gymnastics Championships were held from September 21–28, 2023 in Jinan, Shandong.

== Women's medalists ==
Event	Gold	Silver	Bronze
Team	Guangdong（广东省） Bi Qingqing; Hu Jiafei; Wu Ran; Luo Rui; Ou Yushan; Sun Xinyi	Zhejiang（浙江省） Luo Huan; Huang Zhuofan; Yi Siqi; Wu Sihan; Zhang Qingying; Zhang Xinyi	Shanghai (上海); Chen Shutong; Qin Xinyi; Wang Hao; Wang Ying; Zhang Jin; Zhou Yichun
Individual all-around	Qiu Qiyuan	Ou Yushan	Zhang Qingying
Vault	Yu Linmin	Wang Yan	Zhang Qingying
Uneven bars	Qiu Qiyuan	Huang Zhuofan	Wei Xiaoyuan
Balance beam	Qiu Qiyuan	Zhang Qingying	Ou Yushan
Floor	Zhou Yaqin	Zhang Qingying	Shang Chunsong

== Men's medalists ==
Event	Gold	Silver	Bronze
Team	Jiangsu (江苏省); Shi Cong; Sun Wei; Tang Qi; Yang Yanzhi; Yin Dehang; You Hao	Hunan (湖南省); Tan Di; Liao Jialei; Liu Yang; Luo Yongsheng; Yang Jiaxing; Zhang Boheng	Guangdong (广东); He Junhua; He Quqin; She Zhihui; Ta Yinga; Wu Xiaoming; Zhang Yangyu
Individual all-around	Zhang Boheng	Shi Cong	Ta Yinga
Floor	Ge Shihao	Su Weide	Li Hongyan
Pommel horse	Sun Wei	Lu Chongcan	Yin Dehang
Rings	Liu Yang	Lan Xingyu	Zhang Boheng
Vault	Chen Yilu	Wu Jianhao	He Quqin
Parallel bars	Zou Jingyuan	Yin Dehang	Zhang Boheng
Horizontal bar	Zhang Boheng	Liao Jialei	Li Hongyan
