= 2014 Chinese Artistic Gymnastics Championships =

- Location: (China) Nanning, Guangxi
- Start date: May 8, 2014
- End date: May 12, 2014

The 2014 Chinese Artistic Gymnastics Championships were held from 8 May to 12 May 2014 in Nanning.

== Men's event medal winners ==
Event	Gold	Silver	Bronze
Team	Guizhou	Guangxi	People's Liberation Army
Individual all-around	Deng Shudi	Liu Rongbing	Lin Chaopan
Floor Exercise	Deng Xiaofeng	Gu Baisen	Deng Shudi
Pommel Horse	Wang Bo	Xiao Ruoteng	Weng Hao
Still Rings	Liu Yang	Liao Junlin	Wu Guanhua
Vault	Huang Mingqi Qu Ruiyang	Not Awarded	Huang Xi
Parallel Bars	Deng Shudi You Hao	Not Awarded	Cheng Ran Liu Rongbing
Horizontal Bar	Deng Shudi Yang Shengchao	Not Awarded	Zhu Zhenquan

== Women's event medal winners ==
Event	Gold	Silver	Bronze
Team	Zhejiang; Huang Huidan; Luo Huan; Lv Jiaqi; Lou Nina; Yuan Xiaoyang; Wang Wei	Guangdong; Liu Tingting; Zhu Xiaofang; Chen Li; Liu Ying; Yi Ruoyang; Xu Chujun	Hunan; Shang Chunsong; Xie Yufen; Cao Yiwen; Xiao Jiale; Deng Shihui; Yang Tingting
All Around	Yao Jinnan (Fujian)	Shang Chunsong (Hunan)	Wang Yan (Beijing)
Vault	Wang Yan (Beijing)	Deng Yalan (Jiangxi)	Liu Jinru (Henan)
Uneven Bars	Yao Jinnan (Fujian)	Shang Chunsong (Hunan); Huang Huidan (Zhejiang)	
Balance Beam	Shang Chunsong (Hunan)	Bai Yawen (Guangxi)	Liu Tingting (Guangdong)
Floor	Shang Chunsong (Hunan)	Yao Jinnan (Fujian)	Wang Yan (Beijing)

=== Women's Team Final ===
Rank	Team	Vault (gymnastics)	Uneven bars	Balance beam	Floor (gymnastics)	Total
1st place, gold medalist(s)	Zhejiang	54.650 (3)	55.000 (1)	57.000 (1)	52.100 (2)	218.750
1st place, gold medalist(s)	Luo Huan	13.850	14.650	14.450	13.000	55.950
1st place, gold medalist(s)	Lv Jiaqi	13.500	13.850	14.150	12.400	53.900
1st place, gold medalist(s)	Yuan Xiaoyang	13.700	11.500	13.450	12.800	51.450
1st place, gold medalist(s)	Huang Huidan		15.000	14.350	13.350	42.700
1st place, gold medalist(s)	Lou Nina	12.750		14.050	12.950	39.750
1st place, gold medalist(s)	Wang Wei	13.600				
2nd place, silver medalist(s)	Guangdong	55.500 (1)	53.900 (2)	53.050 (4)	53.500 (1)	216.000
2nd place, silver medalist(s)	Liu Tingting	15.100	14.400	14.050	13.450	57.000
2nd place, silver medalist(s)	Zhu Xiaofang	13.150	13.900	12.850	12.850	52.750
2nd place, silver medalist(s)	Liu Ying		12.850	13.100	13.550	39.500
2nd place, silver medalist(s)	Yi Ruoyang	13.700	12.350	13.050		39.100
2nd place, silver medalist(s)	Xu Chujun	13.550		11.800	12.900	38.250
2nd place, silver medalist(s)	Chen Li		12.800		13.600	26.400
3rd place, bronze medalist(s)	Hunan	52.600 (7)	53.150 (3)	55.350 (2)	50.250 (5)	211.350
3rd place, bronze medalist(s)	Shang Chunsong	13.650	14.950	14.700	13.800	57.100
3rd place, bronze medalist(s)	Xie Yufen	13.400	14.150	13.950	12.550	54.050
3rd place, bronze medalist(s)	Cao Yiwen	12.750	11.250	13.100	11.300	48.400
3rd place, bronze medalist(s)	Deng Shihui	12.800	9.600	12.900	11.750	47.050
3rd place, bronze medalist(s)	Xiao Jiale	12.700		13.600	12.150	38.450
3rd place, bronze medalist(s)	Yang Tingting		12.800			12.800
4	Shanghai	55.150 (2)	49.600 (5)	53.850 (3)	50.250 (5)	208.850
4	Xu Li	12.450	12.850	12.800	12.950	51.050
4	Zhang Yiqian	13.450	13.200	12.400	11.550	50.600
4	Tan Sixin	13.450	11.500	14.150	11.300	50.400
4	Yang Tianyi	14.700	12.050		12.500	39.250
4	Zhang Jin	13.550		13.650		27.200
4	Xi Beini			13.250	13.250	26.500
5	Fujian	54.650 (3)	52.400 (4)	48.250 (9)	51.550 (4)	206.850
5	Yao Jinnan	15.100	15.500	14.100	14.000	58.700
5	Chen Siyi	14.250	13.550	13.300	12.800	53.900
5	Huang Peijun	13.700	10.550	11.050	12.300	47.600
5	Yu Yanfang	11.600		9.800	12.450	33.850
5	Zheng Lin		12.800			12.800
6	Jiangsu	53.450 (6)	48.800 (6)	51.200 (5)	51.800 (3)	205.250
6	Zhou Linlin	12.550	13.000	14.200	13.650	53.400
6	Qin Chang	13.750	11.950	13.350	12.950	52.000
6	Lin Yitong	13.600	11.150	10.800	12.350	47.900
6	Li Ziqi	13.550		10.450	12.850	36.850
6	Zhou Jie		12.700	12.850		25.550
7	Beijing	53.750 (5)	46.650 (8)	49.350 (7)	50.150 (7)	199.900
7	Wang Yan	15.400	12.500	12.250	13.750	53.900
7	Yuan Jiahe	12.400	10.650	12.350	11.550	46.950
7	Niu Sizhuo		12.150	12.750	12.400	37.300
7	Song Yuxuan	12.300		12.000	12.450	36.750
7	Li Yiting	13.650			9.750	23.400
7	Gu Jingwen		11.350	11.900		23.250
8	Hebei	51.200 (9)	48.250 (7)	49.500 (6)	48.250 (8)	197.200
8	Li Shanshan	13.450	10.750	13.650	12.450	50.300
8	Zhang Wenxin	12.650	11.300	13.350	12.600	49.900
8	Zhang Yan	12.550	12.050	11.350	11.350	47.300
8	Zhu Jialin	12.550	11.350	11.150	11.850	46.900
8	Hu Lan		13.550	0.200		13.750
9	Hubei	48.850 (10)	44.850 (9)	48.950 (8)	45.900 (10)	188.550
9	Chen Yongdie	12.350	11.850	12.500	11.150	47.850
9	Gong Kangyi	12.100	10.600	11.850	10.250	44.800
9	Wu Jing	13.200		12.550	11.350	37.100
9	Chen Chaohui		10.450	12.050	12.250	34.750
9	Mei Jie		11.950		11.150	23.100
9	Liu Zhilin	11.200				11.200
10	Jiangxi	51.900 (8)	19.150 (10)	46.650 (10)	46.500 (9)	164.200
10	Wang Jiayi	11.350	10.850	10.750	11.900	44.850
10	Kui Simin	12.450	8.300	11.450	11.500	43.700
10	Deng Yalan	15.000		11.900	12.150	39.050
10	Lin Jinyu	13.100		12.550	10.950	36.600

=== Women's All-Around Final ===
Rank	Gymnast	Team	Vault (gymnastics)	Uneven bars	Balance beam	Floor (gymnastics)	Total
1st place, gold medalist(s)	Yao Jinnan	Fujian	15.200	15.700	14.350	14.150	59.400
2nd place, silver medalist(s)	Shang Chunsong	Hunan	13.600	15.500	14.850	14.900	58.850
3rd place, bronze medalist(s)	Wang Yan	Beijing	15.200	12.850	14.350	13.800	56.200
4	Luo Huan	Zhejiang	13.750	14.150	14.700	13.550	56.150
5	Chen Siyi	Fujian	14.800	13.850	13.100	13.350	55.100
6	Lv Jiaqi	Zhejiang	13.250	13.550	14.250	13.700	54.750
7	Xie Yufen	Hunan	13.350	13.550	14.250	13.200	54.350
8	Zhou Linlin	Jiangsu	13.450	13.950	13.900	12.500	53.800
9	Liu Tingting	Guangdong	14.650	14.400	12.050	12.450	53.550
10	Bai Yawen	Guangxi	13.650	13.000	13.350	12.750	52.750
11	Xu Li	Shanghai	12.500	13.800	12.800	13.100	52.200
12	Qin Chang	Jiangsu	13.750	12.100	14.000	12.200	52.050
13	Zhu Xiaofang	Guangdong	12.550	13.800	12.800	12.900	51.850
14	Tan Sixin	Shanghai	13.100	13.100	12.600	12.450	51.250
15	Li Shanshan	Hebei	13.500	11.100	13.750	12.150	50.500
16	Li Linxi	Guizhou	13.250	12.400	11.650	12.400	49.700
17	Zhang Wenxin	Hebei	11.800	11.350	13.850	12.050	49.050
18	Lu Qiuying	Guangxi	13.400	11.300	11.800	12.250	48.750
19	Wang Qianmei	Yunnan	12.600	11.300	12.400	12.050	48.350
20	Li Linyi	Sichuan	13.400	11.500	10.950	12.300	48.150
21	Chen Yongdie	Hubei	12.300	10.950	12.550	11.250	47.050
22	Yuan Jiahe	Beijing	12.450	11.300	12.000	10.850	46.600
23	Wang Jiayi	Jiangxi	11.350	11.250	10.850	11.200	44.650
24	Hu Hongling	Guizhou	12.450	8.850	11.300	10.800	43.400

=== Women's Vault Final ===
Rank	Gymnast	Team	D Score	E Score	Pen.	Score 1	D Score	E Score	Pen.	Score 2	Total
1st place, gold medalist(s)	Wang Yan	Beijing	6.0+0.3	9.134		15.434	6.2+0.3	8.734		15.234	15.334
2nd place, silver medalist(s)	Deng Yalan	Jiangxi	6.0+0.3	8.700		15.000	6.2+0.3	8.700		15.200	15.100
3rd place, bronze medalist(s)	Liu Jinru	Henan	5.0	8.534		13.534	6.0+0.3	8.600		14.900	14.217
4	Li Yiwei	Henan	6.0+0.3	7.667	0.1	13.867	6.2+0.3	7.467	0.3	13.667	13.767
5	Yang Tianyi	Shanghai	5.8+0.2	7.543	0.1	13.434	6.2+0.3	7.434		13.934	13.684
6	Li Ziqi	Jiangsu	5.2	8.434		13.634	5.0	8.634		13.634	13.634
7	Yuan Xiaoyang	Zhejiang	5.0	8.567		13.567	6.0+0.3	7.467	0.3	13.467	13.517
8	Ng Yan Yin	Hong Kong	4.2	8.300		12.500	2.4	8.900		11.300	11.900
Rank	Gymnast	Team	Vault 1				Vault 2				Total

=== Women's Uneven Bars Final ===
Rank	Gymnast	Team	D Score	E Score	Pen.	Total
1st place, gold medalist(s)	Yao Jinnan	Fujian	7.0+0.2	8.434		15.634
2nd place, silver medalist(s)	Shang Chunsong	Hunan	6.5	8.800		15.300
2nd place, silver medalist(s)	Huang Huidan	Zhejiang	6.8+0.1	8.400		15.300
4	Luo Huan	Zhejiang	6.2	8.234		14.434
5	Xie Yufen	Hunan	6.4	7.834		14.234
6	Liu Tingting	Guangdong	6.0+0.1	7.667		13.767
7	Zhu Xiaofang	Guangdong	5.7	8.000		13.700
8	Chen Siyi	Fujian	1.8	2.100		3.900

=== Women's Balance Beam Final ===
Rank	Gymnast	Team	D Score	E Score	Pen.	Total
1st place, gold medalist(s)	Shang Chunsong	Hunan	6.6+0.2	8.567		15.367
2nd place, silver medalist(s)	Bai Yawen	Guangxi	6.3	8.234		14.534
3rd place, bronze medalist(s)	Liu Tingting	Guangdong	6.3+0.1	8.200	0.1	14.500
4	Huang Huidan	Zhejiang	6.0	8.367		14.367
5	Tan Sixin	Shanghai	6.2+0.1	7.967		14.267
6	Luo Huan	Zhejiang	6.3	8.000	0.1	14.200
7	Yao Jinnan	Fujian	5.9	8.100		14.000
8	Zhou Linlin	Jiangsu	6.0	7.400		13.400

=== Women's Floor Exercise Final ===
Rank	Gymnast	Team	D Score	E Score	Pen.	Total
1st place, gold medalist(s)	Shang Chunsong	Hunan	6.3+0.2	8.400		14.900
2nd place, silver medalist(s)	Yao Jinnan	Fujian	5.6	8.434		14.034
3rd place, bronze medalist(s)	Wang Yan	Beijing	5.7	8.100		13.800
4	Liu Ying	Guangdong	5.4	8.300		13.700
5	Liu Tingting	Guangdong	5.3	8.267		13.567
6	Zhou Linlin	Jiangsu	5.4	7.034		12.434
7	Bai Yawen	Guangxi	5.3	7.400	0.3	12.400
8	Huang Huidan	Zhejiang	5.1	6.334		11.434
