= 2025 Chinese Artistic Gymnastics Championships =

Gymnastics competition in Nanning, China

- Location: (China) Nanning
- Start date: May 15, 2025
- End date: May 22, 2025

The 2025 Chinese Artistic Gymnastics Championships were held from May 15–22, 2025 in Nanning, China.

== Women's medalists ==
Event	Gold	Silver	Bronze
Team	Zhejiang（浙江省） Chen Xinyun; Jin Xiaoxuan; Wang Jingci; Zhang Qingying; Zhang Xinyi; Zhao Haiyu	Guangdong（广东） He Jialin; Hu Jiafei; Huang Ziyi; Ke Qinqin; Ou Yushan; Zhong Qi	Henan (河南); Liu Jinru; Wang Zixuan; Zhang Ruoxi; Zhang Wanning; Zhang Xiaoxuan; Zhang Yihan
Individual all-around	Zhang Qingying	Qin Xinyi	Zhang Yihan
Vault	Liu Jinru	Deng Yalan	Yu Linmin
Uneven bars	Yang Fanyuwei	Xie Guying	Zhong Qi
Balance beam	Zhou Yaqin	Zhang Qingying	Yu Wenjing
Floor	Zhang Yihan	Zhou Yaqin	Yang Jinxi

== Men's medalists ==
Event	Gold	Silver	Bronze
Team	Jiangsu (江苏省); Shi Cong; Sun Wei; Tang Qi; Hong Yanming; Yin Dehang; You Hao	Hunan (湖南省); Tan Di; Yang Dingkai; Liu Yang; Luo Yongsheng; Yang Jiaxing; Zhang Boheng	Guangdong (广东); He Junhua; He Quqin; She Zhihui; Ta Yinga; Wu Xiaoming; Zhang Yangyu
Individual all-around	Zhang Boheng	Shi Cong	Lan Xingyu
Floor	Wang Haoyu	Ge Shihao	Chen Zhilong
Pommel horse	Hong Yanming	Li Liang	Lu Chongcan
Rings	Liu Yang	You Hao	Lan Xingyu
Vault	Huang Mingqi	Hu Youtian	Chen Zhilong
Parallel bars	Zou Jingyuan	You Hao	Xie Chenyi
Horizontal bar	Huang Mingqi	Zhang Songhonghao	Yang Haonan
