= 2024 Chinese Artistic Gymnastics Championships =

Gymnastics competition in Zhaoqing, China

- Location: (China) Zhaoqing
- Start date: April 24, 2024
- End date: April 29, 2024

The 2024 Chinese Artistic Gymnastics Championships were held from April 24–29, 2024 in Zhaoqing, China.

== Women's medalists ==
Event	Gold	Silver	Bronze
Team	Zhejiang (浙江省); Huang Zhuofan; Jin Xiaoxuan; Luo Yuan; Yi Siqi; Zhang Qingying; Zhang Xinyi	Guangdong (广东省); He Jialin; Hu Jiafei; Ke Qinqin; Ou Yushan; Sun Xinyi; Zhong Jiatong	Fujian (福建); Chen Feng; Chu Yiming; Liu Sibei; Nian Shiyan; Qiu Qiyuan; Yu Linmin
Individual all-around	Qiu Qiyuan	Ou Yushan	Zhou Yaqin
Vault	Yu Linmin	Zhang Yihan	Ye Dandan
Uneven bars	Qiu Qiyuan	Huang Zhuofan	Ou Yushan
Balance beam	Zhou Yaqin	Zhang Qingying	Qiu Qiyuan
Floor	Yang Jingxi	Chen Xinyi	Qiu Qiyuan

== Men's medalists ==
Event	Gold	Silver	Bronze
Team	Jiangsu (江苏省); Shi Cong; Sun Wei; Tang Qi; Hong Yanming; Yin Dehang; You Hao	Hunan (湖南省); Tan Di; Liao Jialei; Liu Yang; Luo Yongsheng; Yang Dingkai; Zhang Boheng	Guangdong (广东); He Junhua; He Quqin; She Zhihui; Ta Yinga; Wang Zhen; Zhang Yangyu
Individual all-around	Shi Cong	Xiao Ruoteng	Sun Wei
Floor	Su Weide	Yang Yanzhi	Xiao Ruoteng
Pommel horse	Zou Jingyuan	Lu Chongcan	Zhang Boheng
Rings	Liu Yang	Zou Jingyuan	You Hao
Vault	Huang Mingqi	Chen Zhilong	Chen Yilu
Parallel bars	Zou Jingyuan	You Hao	Hu Xuwei
Horizontal bar	Shi Cong	Tian Hao	Xiao Ruoteng
