= 2022 Chinese Artistic Gymnastics Championships =

Gymnastics competition in Hangzhou, China

- Location: (China) Hangzhou, Zhejiang
- Start date: September 4, 2022
- End date: September 9, 2022

The 2022 Chinese Artistic Gymnastics Championships were held from September 4–9, 2022 in Hangzhou, Zhejiang.

== Women's medalists ==
Event	Gold	Silver	Bronze
Team	Guangdong (广东省); Bi Qingqing; Hu Jiafei; Liu Xinyu; Luo Rui; Ou Yushan; Sun Xinyi	Zhejiang (浙江省); Chen Yanfei; Huang Zhuofan; Jin Xiaoxuan; Wu Sihan; Zhang Qingying; Zhang Xinyi	Anhui (安徽); He Licheng; Qin Mengran; Xiang Lulu; Yue Yue
Individual all-around	Tang Xijing	Ou Yushan	He Licheng
Vault	Yu Linmin	Zhang Qingying	Wu Jianqiong
Uneven bars	Luo Rui	Wei Xiaoyuan	Tang Xijing
Balance beam	Qiu Qiyuan	Sun Xinyi	Ou Yushan
Floor	Xiang Lulu	Jin Xiaoxuan	Zhao Jiayi

== Men's medalists ==
Event	Gold	Silver	Bronze
Team	Jiangsu (江苏省); Shi Cong; Sun Wei; Tang Qi; Yang Tianle; Yin Dehang; You Hao	Hunan (湖南省); Li Yi; Liao Jialei; Liu Yang; Luo Yongsheng; Yang Jiaxing; Zhang Boheng	Zhejiang (浙江省); Chen Yilu; Tian Hao; Wu Junding; Xie Chenyi; Yang Haonan; Zhang Liqi
Individual all-around	Zhang Boheng	Sun Wei	Yang Jiaxing
Floor	Zhang Boheng	Su Weide	Ge Shihao
Pommel horse	Lu Chongcan	Tian Hao	Zhang Boheng
Rings	You Hao	Zou Jingyuan	Ye Diqing
Vault	Chen Yilu	Liu Yang	Chen Zhiyi
Parallel bars	You Hao	Yin Dehang	Zhang Boheng
Horizontal bar	Zhang Boheng	Sun Wei	Tian Hao
