= 2020 Chinese Artistic Gymnastics Championships =

- Location: (China) Zhaoqing, Guangdong
- Start date: September 23, 2020
- End date: September 28, 2020

The 2020 Chinese Artistic Gymnastics Championships were held from September 23–28, 2020 in Zhaoqing, Guangdong. They were postponed from their original date in May due to the COVID-19 pandemic.

== Women's medalists ==
Event	Gold	Silver	Bronze
Team	Guangdong (广东省); Chen Yile; Liu Jingxing; Liu Tingting; Liu Yongtong; Sun Xinyi; Wu Ran	Beijing (北京市); Du Siyu; Lin Haibin; Qi Qi; Tang Xijing; Wang Jingying; Wu Boyang	Zhejiang (浙江省); Chen Yanfei; Guan Chenchen; Li Qi; Luo Huan; Lv Jiaqi; Sheng Jingyi
Individual all-around	Liu Tingting (Guangdong)	Wei Xiaoyuan (Guangxi)	Qi Qi (Beijing)
Vault	Qi Qi (Beijing)	Yu Linmin (Fujian)	Liu Jinru (Henan)
Uneven bars	Fan Yilin (Shanghai)	Cheng Shiyi (Fujian)	Liu Tingting (Guangdong)
Balance beam	Guan Chenchen (Zhejiang)	Wei Xiaoyuan (Guangxi)	Liu Tingting (Guangdong)
Floor	Qi Qi (Beijing)	Wu Ran (Guangdong)	Lu Yufei (Henan)

== Men's medalists ==
Event	Gold	Silver	Bronze
Team	Jiangsu (江苏省); Ma Yue; Shi Cong; Sun Wei; Weng Hao; Yin Dehang; You Hao	Guangdong (广东省); Du Yixin; Huang Zenan; She Zhihui; Ta Yinga; Wu Xiaoming; Yao Jiahang	Guangxi (广西壮族自治区); Gu Xinhong; Lan Xingyu; Long Mingzhe; Lu Chongcan; Meng Zhiwei; Wei Kunyi
Individual all-around	Sun Wei (Jiangsu)	Xiao Ruoteng (National Team)	Deng Shudi (National Team)
Floor	Deng Shudi (National Team)	Wang Haoran (Shandong)	Zhou Caisong (Shandong)
Pommel horse	Zou Jingyuan (National Team)	Xiao Ruoteng (National Team)	Wang Junwen (Yunnan)
Rings	Liu Yang (National Team)	Lan Xingyu (Guangxi)	You Hao (Jiangsu)
Vault	Huang Mingqi (National Team)	Qu Ruiyang (Hunan)	Chen Yilu (Zhejiang)
Parallel bars	Wu Xiaoming (Guangdong)	Zou Jingyuan (National Team)	You Hao (Jiangsu)
Horizontal bar	Ji Lianshen (Guangdong)	Lin Chaopan (Fujian)	Xiang Bagenqiu (Beijing)
