= Deng Yalan =

Chinese artistic gymnast (born 1999)

- 邓娅兰
- Born: April 24, 1999 (age 27) Yunnan, China

Gymnastics career
- Discipline: Women's artistic gymnastics
- Country represented: China
- Head coaches: Xiong Jingbin (熊景斌), Zhang Xia (張霞)
Medal record
Representing China
National Games
Gold medal – first place	2025 Guangdong	Vault
Silver medal – second place	2013 Liaoning	Vault
Silver medal – second place	2021 Shaanxi	Vault

Deng Yalan (simplified Chinese: 邓娅兰; traditional Chinese: 鄧婭蘭; pinyin: Dèng Yǎlán; born April 24 1999) is a Chinese gymnast. As of 2014, she represented the Jiangxi province in domestic competition. Her best event is vault.

== Junior career ==
In 2013, Deng won bronze on vault at the Chinese National Championships, and silver on vault at the Chinese National Games later that year. The following year, she repeated her silver on vault and placed tenth with her team.

== Competitive history ==
Competitive history of Deng Yalan
Year	Event	Team	AA	VT	UB	BB	FX
2013	National Championships			3rd place, bronze medalist(s)			
2013	National Games			2nd place, silver medalist(s)			
2014	National Championships			2nd place, silver medalist(s)			
2015	São Paulo World Challenge Cup			1st place, gold medalist(s)			
2017	National Championships			6			
2017	National Games			4			
2018	National Championships			4			
2019	National Championships			3rd place, bronze medalist(s)			
2021	National Championships			1st place, gold medalist(s)			
2021	National Games			2nd place, silver medalist(s)			
2025	National Championships			2nd place, silver medalist(s)			
2025	World Championships			DNS (Note: Deng failed to complete her first vault as she did a tuck jump over the table, a non-recognized element. As a result she did not receive a score and was unable to attempt her second vault.)			
2025	National Games			1st place, gold medalist(s)			
