= Zhang Xinyi (artistic gymnast) =

Chinese artistic gymnast (born 2007)

- 张欣怡
- Born: September 29, 2007 (age 19) Hubei, China

Gymnastics career
- Discipline: Women's artistic gymnastics
- Country represented: China; (2022–present)
Medal record
Representing China
Women's artistic gymnastics
Asian Games
Gold medal – first place	2022 Hangzhou	Team
Asian Championships
Gold medal – first place	2023 Singapore	Team
Gold medal – first place	2025 Jecheon	Team
Silver medal – second place	2023 Singapore	Balance beam

Zhang Xinyi (Chinese: 张欣怡; born September 29, 2007) is a Chinese artistic gymnast. She was part of the gold medal winning teams at the 2022 Asian Games and at the 2023 and 2025 Asian Championships.

== Gymnastics career ==
=== 2019–2022 ===
At the junior level, Zhang only competed domestically. At her debut China National Youth Games in 2019, she won bronze on the uneven bars at the espoir level. At the 2020 Junior Chinese Championships, she placed second in the all-around in the under-14 division.

=== 2023–present ===
Zhang became age-eligible for senior level competition in 2023. She made her international debut at the 2023 Asian Championships in Singapore where she helped the Chinese team win gold. Individually she won silver on balance beam behind teammate Zhang Qingying. Later that year she competed at the postponed 2022 Asian Games where she helped China win gold as a team.

Zhang began the 2024 year competing at the DTB Pokal Team Challenge and Mixed Cup. She helped China win gold in the team challenge and silver in the mixed cup. Zhang ended the year competing at the 2024 Chinese Individual Championships where she placed first in the all-around.

At the 2025 Asian Championships, Zhang helped China win team gold. Individually she finished fifth in the all-around and seventh on balance beam. At the 2025 National Games of China, Zhang's province of Zhejiang won gold; individually she won silver on balance beam behind Ke Qinqin and placed seventh in the all-around.

Zhang competed at the 2026 City of Jesolo Trophy where she helped China finished fourth. Individually she placed ninth in the all-around and fifth on balance beam.

== Competitive history ==
Competitive history of Zhang Xinyi
Year	Event	Team	AA	VT	UB	BB	FX
2019	Chinese Junior Championships (U-13)		19		3rd place, bronze medalist(s)		
2019	National Youth Games	2nd place, silver medalist(s)	8		3rd place, bronze medalist(s)		
2020	Chinese Junior Championships (U-14)		2nd place, silver medalist(s)		4	7	
2021	Yangtze Delta Invitational	4	3rd place, bronze medalist(s)			2nd place, silver medalist(s)	
2021	Chinese Championships	3rd place, bronze medalist(s)	13				
2021	Chinese Youth Games	1st place, gold medalist(s)					
2021	Chinese National Games	4	10				
2022	Chinese Championships	2nd place, silver medalist(s)	6		5		
2023	Chinese Championships	2nd place, silver medalist(s)	4		7		8
2023	Asian Championships	1st place, gold medalist(s)				2nd place, silver medalist(s)	
2023	Asian Games	1st place, gold medalist(s)					8
2023	Chinese Individual Championships		1st place, gold medalist(s)				
2024	DTB Pokal Team Challenge	1st place, gold medalist(s)					
2024	DTB Pokal Mixed Cup	2nd place, silver medalist(s)					
2024	Chinese Championships	1st place, gold medalist(s)	11				
2024	Chinese Individual Championships		1st place, gold medalist(s)		3rd place, bronze medalist(s)	2nd place, silver medalist(s)	1st place, gold medalist(s)
2025	Chinese Championships	1st place, gold medalist(s)	8				5
2025	Asian Championships	1st place, gold medalist(s)	5			7	
2025	Chinese National Games	1st place, gold medalist(s)	7			2nd place, silver medalist(s)	4
2026	City of Jesolo Trophy	4	9			5	4
2026	Chinese Championships	3rd place, bronze medalist(s)	6				4
