= Liu Yang (gymnast, born 2000) =

Chinese artistic gymnast

- Born: 30 May 2000 (age 26) Hengyang, Hunan, China

Gymnastics career
- Discipline: Men's artistic gymnastics
- Country represented: China
- Club: Hunan Province
Medal record
Representing China
Asian Championships
Gold medal – first place	2026 Zunyi	Team
World University Games
Silver medal – second place	2025 Rhine-Ruhr	Rings
FIG World Cup
Event / 1st / 2nd / 3rd; Apparatus World Cup / 1 / 0 / 1

Liu Yang (simplified Chinese: 刘洋; traditional Chinese: 劉洋; pinyin: Liú Yáng; born 30 May 2000) is a Chinese artistic gymnast. He is the 2025 World University Games silver medalist on rings.

== Early life ==
Liu was born in Hunan in 2000. He attends Hunan Normal University, majoring in sports training.

== Gymnastics career ==
For many years, Liu only competed domestically. He made his international debut for China at the 2025 World University Games where he won silver on rings behind compatriot Liu Hengyu. For his next international assignment, Liu competed at the 2026 Cairo World Cup where he won gold on parallel bars and bronze on rings. He competed at the 2026 Asian Championships where he helped China win gold as a team. Individually, he finished seventh on the parallel bars.

== Competitive history ==
Competitive history of Liu Yang
Year	Event	Team	AA	FX	PH	SR	VT	PB	HB
2018	Chinese Championships	2nd place, silver medalist(s)	8						
2019	Chinese Championships	5	14				7		
2020	Chinese Championships	4					5		
2020	Chinese Individual Championships						5		
2021	Chinese Championships	2nd place, silver medalist(s)					3rd place, bronze medalist(s)		
2021	Chinese National Games	2nd place, silver medalist(s)					5	7	
2022	Chinese Championships	2nd place, silver medalist(s)					2nd place, silver medalist(s)	4	
2023	Chinese Championships	2nd place, silver medalist(s)				6	8	6	
2024	Chinese Championships	2nd place, silver medalist(s)				8			
2024	Chinese Individual Championships					8		2nd place, silver medalist(s)	
2025	Chinese Championships	2nd place, silver medalist(s)						4	
2025	World University Games					2nd place, silver medalist(s)			
2025	Chinese National Games	2nd place, silver medalist(s)				8		7	
2026	Cairo World Cup					3rd place, bronze medalist(s)		1st place, gold medalist(s)	
2026	Chinese Championships	2nd place, silver medalist(s)		8		6		5	7
2026	Asian Championships	1st place, gold medalist(s)						7	
