= 2018 Chinese Artistic Gymnastics Championships =

- Location: (China) Zhaoqing, Guangdong
- Start date: May 7, 2018
- End date: May 13, 2018

The 2018 Chinese Artistic Gymnastics Championships were held from 7 May to 13 May 2018 in Zhaoqing, Guangdong.

== Women's Medalists ==
Event	Gold	Silver	Bronze
Team	Guangdong; Chen Yile; Liu Jingxing; Liu Tingting; Ou Yushan; Zhao Shiting	Beijing; Du Siyu; Lin Yuyao; Qi Qi; Tang Xijing; Wang Jiarui; Yang Haimeng	Zhejiang; Chen Yanfei; Guan Chenchen; Hu Mengyao; Luo Huan; Lyu Jiaqi; Sheng Jingyi
Individual all-around	Luo Huan (Zhejiang)	Zhang Jin (Shanghai)	Tang Xijing (Beijing)
Vault	Liu Jinru (Henan) Qi Qi (Beijing)	None awarded	Yu Linmin (Fujian)
Uneven Bars	Lyu Jiaqi (Zhejiang)	Luo Huan (Zhejiang)	Chen Yile (Guangdong)
Balance Beam	Luo Huan (Zhejiang)	Chen Yile (Guangdong) Guan Chenchen (Zhejiang)	None awarded
Floor Exercise	Liu Jinru (Henan)	Yin Sisi (Hubei)	Zhao Shiting (Guangdong)

== Men's Medalists ==
Event	Gold	Silver	Bronze
Team	Jiangsu; Ma Yue; Shi Cong; Sun Wei; Weng Hao; Yin Dexing; You Hao	Hunan; Li Yi; Liu Yang; Qu Ruiyang; Tan Di; Yang Jiaxing; Zhang Boheng	Beijing; Chen Cong; Jin Zhengyuan; Xiang Bagenqiu; Xiao Ruoteng; Wu Jianfei; Zhao Weikang
Individual all-around	Xiao Ruoteng (Beijing)	Sun Wei (Jiangsu)	Deng Shudi (Guizhou)
Floor Exercise	Wang Haoran (Shandong)	Su Weide (Shandong)	Shi Cong (Jiangsu)
Pommel Horse	Weng Hao (Jiangsu)	Yan Renpeng (Shandong)	Li Yi (Hunan)
Still Rings	Lan Xingyu (Guangxi)	Lei Peng (Shanghai)	Wu Guanhua (Shaanxi)
Vault	Huang Mingqi (Guangxi)	Zhang Yijia (Sichuan)	Wei Huyi (Yunnan)
Parallel Bars	Zou Jingyuan (Sichuan)	Wu Xiaoming (Guangdong)	Liu Rongbing (Guizhou)
Horizontal Bar	Deng Shudi (Guizhou) Zhang Chenlong (Shandong)	None awarded	Xiao Ruoteng (Beijing)
