= 2017 Chinese Artistic Gymnastics Championships =

- Location: (China) Wuhan, Hubei
- Start date: May 5, 2017
- End date: May 9, 2017

The 2017 Chinese Artistic Gymnastics Championships were held from 5 May to 9 May 2017 in Wuhan, China.

== Men's event medal winners ==
| Event | Gold | Silver | Bronze |
|---|---|---|---|
| Team | Jiangsu | Guangdong | Guangxi |
| Indivudual all-around | Lin Chaopan | Xiao Ruoteng | Deng Shudi |
| Floor Exercise | Mu Jile | Xiao Ruoteng Sun Wei | Not Awarded |
| Pommel Horse | Zou Jingyuan | Xiao Ruoteng | Wang Junwen |
| Still Rings | Lan Xingyu | Lei Peng | Wu Guanhua |
| Vault | Qu Ruiyang | Shi Yimin | Tao Haopeng |
| Parallel Bars | Zou Jingyuan | Lin Chaopan | He Youxiao |
| Horizontal Bar | Xiao Ruoteng | Sun Wei | Ji Lianshen |

== Women's event medal winners ==
| Event | Gold | Silver | Bronze |
|---|---|---|---|
| Team | Guangdong; Chen Yile; Hong Ke; Liu Jingxing; Liu Tingting; Xu Chujun; Zhu Xiaofang | Beijing; Du Siyu; Fu Xiaqiuran; Jing Yang; Qi Qi; Tang Xijing; Wang Yan | Hunan; Chen Xiaoqing; Luo Youjuan; Shang Chunsong; Tan Jiaxin; Wang Cenyu; Xie Yufen |
| Individual all-around | Luo Huan (Zhejiang) | Chen Yile (Guangdong) | Liu Jingxing (Guangdong) |
| Vault | Liu Jinru (Henan) | Qi Qi (Beijing) | Yu Linmin (Fujian) |
| Uneven Bars | Luo Huan (Zhejiang) | Du Siyu (Beijing) | Fan Yilin (Shanghai) |
| Balance Beam | Zhu Xiaofang (Guangdong) | Li Qi (Zhejiang) Li Hairuo (Hebei) | None awarded |
| Floor | Shang Chunsong (Hunan) | Liu Tingting (Guangdong) | Liu Jingxing (Guangdong) |
