= Mao Yi =

Chinese artistic gymnast

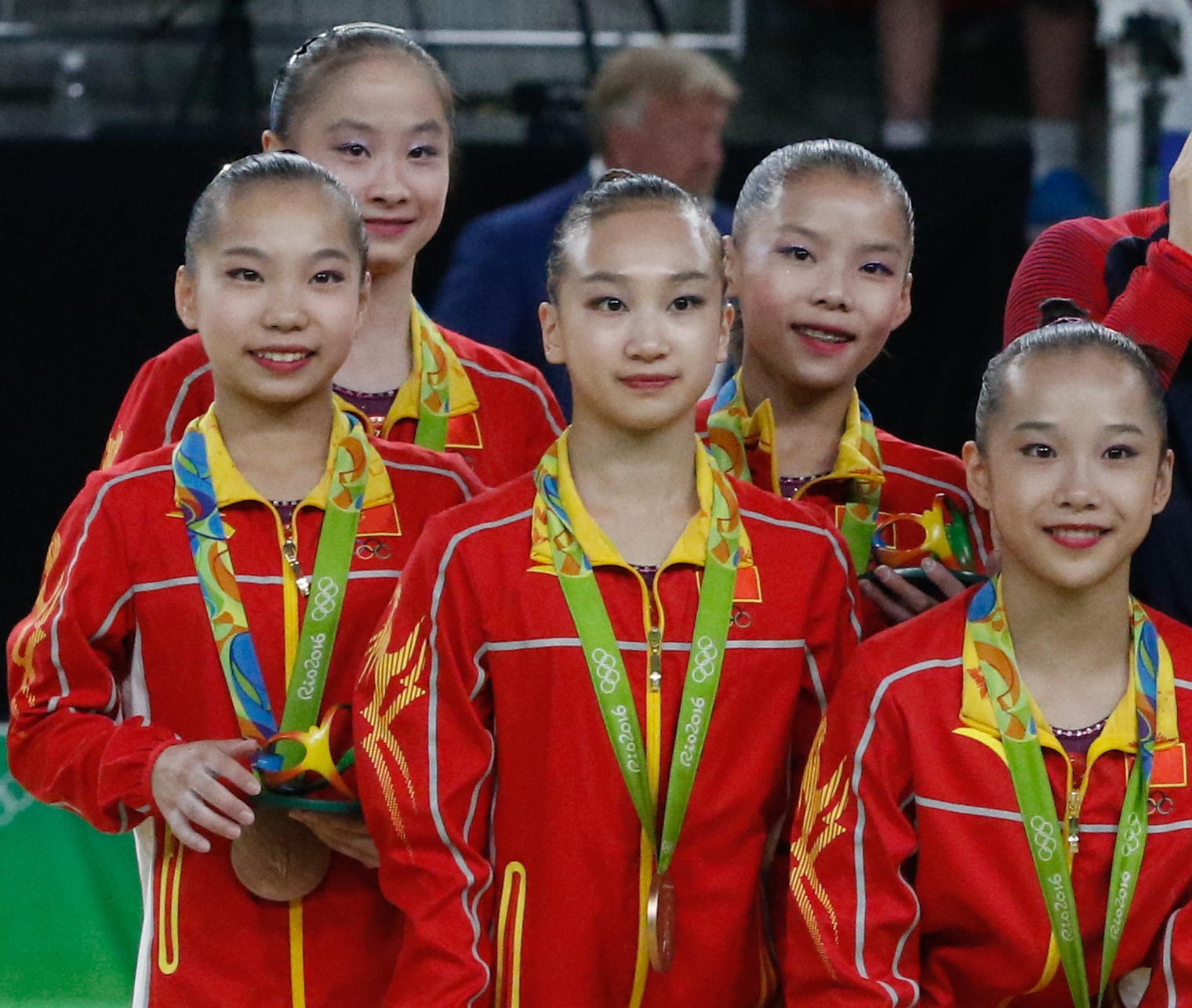
- Born: September 16, 1999 (age 26) Ruijin, Jiangxi, China

Gymnastics career
- Discipline: Women's artistic gymnastics
- Country represented: China (2015–2019)
- Head coaches: 王群策 (Wang Qunce), 徐惊雷 (Xu Jinglei)
- Retired: 2021
Medal record
Representing China
Olympic Games
Bronze medal – third place	2016 Rio de Janeiro	Team
World Championships
Silver medal – second place	2015 Glasgow	Team
Asian Championships
Silver medal – second place	2015 Hiroshima	Team
National Games
Bronze medal – third place	2017 Tianjin	Team

Mao Yi (simplified Chinese: 毛艺; traditional Chinese: 毛藝; pinyin: Máo Yì; born 16 September 1999) is a former Chinese artistic gymnast. She won the silver medal with the team in 2015 World Gymnastic Championships. She competed in the 2016 Olympic Games, where she and her teammates won a bronze medal in the team event.

== Senior career ==
Mao started her senior career in 2015. She was selected into the National Team in February, 2015. In May, she competed at the 2015 Chinese National Championships, winning silver with the Shanghai Team. She also placed fourth in the all-around, eighth on both balance beam and floor.

Later, she made her international debut at the 2015 Asian Championships in Hiroshima, Japan, where she won silver with the Chinese Team and placed seventh on floor Noticeably, she upgraded her vault from a Yurchenko (D4.4) to a Double Twisting Yurchenko (D5.8) since her training at the National Team.

Mao was named to compete at the 2015 World Championships, where she won silver with the team.

In 2016 after finishing 2nd in the all around at Chinese Nationals, Mao was named to the Rio 2016 Olympic Team. At the Olympics in Rio de Janeiro, Brazil, she helped the Chinese team win the bronze medal in the Team event.

In 2018 Mao was selected to compete in the American Cup, in Chicago, Illinois. During the first rotation she fell on her vault, breaking her left femur. She was taken to hospital, where she underwent thigh bone surgery.

Following the injury she sustained in 2018, Mao announced her departure from the national team in 2019 but briefly returned to competition for the 2021 National Games of China; she announced her retirement after the competition in September 2021.

== Competitive history ==
Year	Event	Team	AA	VT	UB	BB	FX
2015	National Championships	2nd	4th			8th	8th
2015	Asian Championships	2nd					7th
2015	World Championships	2nd
2016	National Championships	3rd	2nd				2nd
2016	Olympic Games	3rd
2017	National Games	3rd	6th
