= Yang Jiaxing =

Chinese artistic gymnast

- Born: 15 August 1998 (age 28) Hunan, China

Gymnastics career
- Discipline: Men's artistic gymnastics
- Country represented: China
- Club: Hunan Province
Medal record
Men's artistic gymnastics
Representing China
World Championships
| Gold medal – first place | 2022 Liverpool | Team |
Asian Championships
| Gold medal – first place | 2019 Ulaanbaatar | Team |
| Gold medal – first place | 2019 Ulaanbaatar | Floor exercise |
| Gold medal – first place | 2022 Doha | Team |
| Bronze medal – third place | 2022 Doha | All-around |
| Bronze medal – third place | 2022 Doha | Floor exercise |

Yang Jiaxing (born 15 August 1998) is a Chinese artistic gymnast. He is a 2022 World and 2022 and 2019 Asian champion with the Chinese team. Individually, he is the 2019 Asian champion on the floor exercise. He is also the 2022 Asian Championships all-around and floor exercise bronze medalist.

== Gymnastics career ==
At the 2018 Chinese Championships, Yang won a silver medal with the Hunan province team and also placed fifth in the all-around.

Yang won a gold medal with the Army team at the 2019 Chinese Championships. Then at the 2019 Asian Championships in Ulaanbaatar, he won a team gold medal alongside Liu Rongbing, Lan Xingyu, Huang Mingqi, and Hu Xuwei. Individually, he won the gold medal on the floor exercise with a score of 14.533.

Yang won a silver medal with the Hunan province team at the 2021 Chinese Championships and placed ninth in the all-around. He was not selected for the 2020 Olympics training squad.

At the 2022 Asian Championships in Doha, Yang won a team gold medal alongside Shi Cong, Yin Dehang, Lin Chaopan, and Lan Xingyu. Individually, he won the all-around bronze medal with a total score of 83.733 behind teammate Shi and Filipino gymnast Carlos Yulo. In the event finals, he won another bronze medal on the floor exercise behind Yulo and Kim Han-sol. He also placed fifth in the rings final and sixth in the horizontal bar final. Then at the 2022 Chinese Championships, Yang won a silver medal with the Hunan province team. He also won his first national individual medal by winning bronze in the all-around behind Zhang Boheng and Sun Wei.

Yang was selected to compete at the 2022 World Championships in Liverpool alongside Sun Wei, You Hao, Zhang Boheng, and Zou Jingyuan. The team won the gold medal and qualified China a team spot for the 2024 Olympic Games.
