= Luo Rui =

Chinese artistic gymnast

- 罗蕊
- Born: 26 November 2005 (age 20) Sichuan, China

Gymnastics career
- Discipline: Women's artistic gymnastics
- Country represented: China
- Club: Guangdong Province
- Head coaches: Lu Le, Qiao Liang
Medal record
Women's artistic gymnastics
Representing China
World Championships
Bronze medal – third place	2021 Kitakyushu	Uneven bars
National Games
Gold medal – first place	2021 Shaanxi	Team
Bronze medal – third place	2021 Shaanxi	All-Around

Luo Rui (simplified Chinese: 罗蕊; traditional Chinese: 羅蕊, born 26 November 2005) is a Chinese former artistic gymnast. She is the 2021 World bronze medalist on the uneven bars. She is the 2022 Chinese uneven bars champion and the 2019 Chinese junior all-around champion. She was one of China's alternates for the 2020 Summer Olympics.

== Gymnastics career ==
=== Junior ===
Luo finished fourth in the all-around at the 2018 Chinese Junior Championships, and she won the bronze medal in the floor exercise final. She then competed at the senior-level 2019 Chinese Championships and won a gold medal with the Guangdong provincial team, but she did not advance into any individual finals. She then won the all-around and balance beam titles at the 2019 Chinese Junior Championships. At the Chinese National Youth Games, she won a gold medal with the Guangdong provincial team, and she finished fourth in the uneven bars final.

=== Senior ===
Luo became age-eligible for senior international competitions in 2021. At the 2021 Chinese Championships, she won a gold medal with the Guangdong provincial team and placed eighth in the all-around. In the uneven bars final, she tied with Wei Xiaoyuan for the silver medal. She was named as an alternate for China's 2020 Olympic team. Then at the Chinese National Games, she won the all-around bronze medal behind Wei and Ou Yushan, and she won a gold medal in the team event. She was then selected to make her international debut at the 2021 World Championships. In the uneven bars final, she tied with Rebeca Andrade for the second-highest score, but she lost the tiebreaker and received the bronze medal. She also qualified for the balance beam final, but she fell and finished fifth.

Luo won the uneven bars title at the 2022 Chinese Championships. She was then selected to compete at the 2022 World Championships and was the top qualifier for the uneven bars final. She fell off the balance beam in the team final, and the Chinese team finished sixth. In the uneven bars final, she smacked her feet on the high bar on a layout jaeger release move and finished in sixth place.

Luo won a gold medal with the Guangdong provincial team at the 2023 Chinese Championships, but she did not advance into any individual finals. She announced her retirement from the sport in May 2024.

== Competitive history ==
Competitive history of Luo Rui at the junior level
Year	Event	Team	AA	VT	UB	BB	FX
2018
2018	Chinese Junior Championships		4			5	3rd place, bronze medalist(s)
2019
2019	Chinese Championships	1st place, gold medalist(s)					
2019	Chinese Junior Championships		1st place, gold medalist(s)	8	7	1st place, gold medalist(s)	
2019	Chinese National Youth Games	1st place, gold medalist(s)	7		4		

Competitive history of Luo Rui at the senior level
Year	Event	Team	AA	VT	UB	BB	FX
2021
2021	Chinese Championships	1st place, gold medalist(s)	8		2nd place, silver medalist(s)		
2021	Chinese National Games	1st place, gold medalist(s)	3rd place, bronze medalist(s)			6	
2021	World Championships				3rd place, bronze medalist(s)	5	
2022
2022	Chinese Championships	1st place, gold medalist(s)			1st place, gold medalist(s)	6	
2022	World Championships	6			6		
2023
2023	Chinese Championships	1st place, gold medalist(s)					
