= Huang Zhuofan =

Chinese gymnast (born 2007)

- 黄卓凡
- Born: June 6, 2007 (age 19) Wenzhou, Zhejiang China

Gymnastics career
- Country represented: China

Huang Zhuofan (born 6 June 2007) is a Chinese artistic gymnast.

At the 2022 Chinese Artistic Gymnastics Championships, she won silver in the team competition.

She is part of the Chinese team at the 2023 World Artistic Gymnastics Championships, taking place in Antwerp, Belgium, from 30 September to 8 October.
