= Bai Yawen =

Chinese artistic gymnast

- Full name: 白雅雯 (Bai Yawen)
- Born: 9 September 1998 (age 27) Nanning, Guangxi, China

Gymnastics career
- Discipline: Women's artistic gymnastics
- Country represented: China (2014–17 (CHN))
- Head coaches: Li Zheng (李政), Sun Haiou (孙海欧)
Medal record
Representing China
World Championships
Silver medal – second place	2014 Nanning	Team
Silver medal – second place	2014 Nanning	Balance Beam
Asian Games
Gold medal – first place	2014 Incheon	Team

Bai Yawen (Chinese: 白雅雯) is a former Chinese artistic gymnast. She is the 2014 World balance beam silver medalist. She is also the 2014 World team silver medalist.

2014 was Bai Yawen's first year as a senior gymnast.

At the Chinese National Championships in May, she won the silver on Balance Beam. Later that year, Bai was selected to represent China at the Asian Games in Incheon where she and her teammates Yao Jinnan, Shang Chunsong, Huang Huidan, Tan Jiaxin, and Chen Siyi won team gold. Bai also competed at the World Championships in Nanning, where the Chinese team won the silver medal behind the United States. Despite individually qualifying to the Balance Beam Final, Bai did not compete in Team Finals. However, she later won the silver medal in the Balance Beam Final behind Simone Biles of the United States and ahead of then-reigning World Champion Aliya Mustafina of Russia.

In February 2015, Yawen competed at the 2015 WOGA Classic, finishing eighth all-around. Later in 2016, she competed in the Doha World Cup, and was ranked 4th in the balance beam final. She was not selected to represent China in Rio Olympics. Her last competition was the 2017 National Games of China. Her foot injury affected her performances, and she didn't enter any final. She announced her retirement after the competition via her personal WeChat account.

== Competitive history ==
Year	Event	Team	AA	VT	UB	BB	FX
2014	National Championships		10th			2nd	7th
2014	Asian Games	1st				7th	
2014	World Championships	2nd				2nd	
2015	WOGA Classic		8th				
2015	National Championships	9th	8th				
