= Guo Weiyang =

Chinese gymnast

- Full name: Guo Weiyang
- Born: 1 February 1988 (age 38) Yuxi, Yunnan, China

Gymnastics career
- Discipline: Men's artistic gymnastics
- Country represented: China
- Club: China National School
Medal record
Olympic Games
Gold medal – first place	2012 London	Team

Guo Weiyang (Chinese: 郭伟阳; pinyin: Guō Weǐyáng; born February 1, 1988) is a Chinese gymnast. He competed for the national team at the 2012 Summer Olympics in the Men's artistic team all-around, where they won the gold medal.

== See also ==
- China at the 2012 Summer Olympics
