= Wang Guanyin =

Chinese artistic gymnast

- Born: 9 September 1986 (age 39)

Gymnastics career
- Discipline: Men's artistic gymnastics
- Country represented: China
Medal record
World Championships
Gold medal – first place	2009 London	Parallel Bars

Wang Guanyin (Chinese: 王冠寅; pinyin: Wáng Guànyín; born September 9, 1986, in Tianjin) is a retired male Chinese gymnast. At the 2009 World Artistic Gymnastics Championships he became world champion on parallel bars.
