= Huang Mingqi =

Chinese artistic gymnast

- 黄明淇
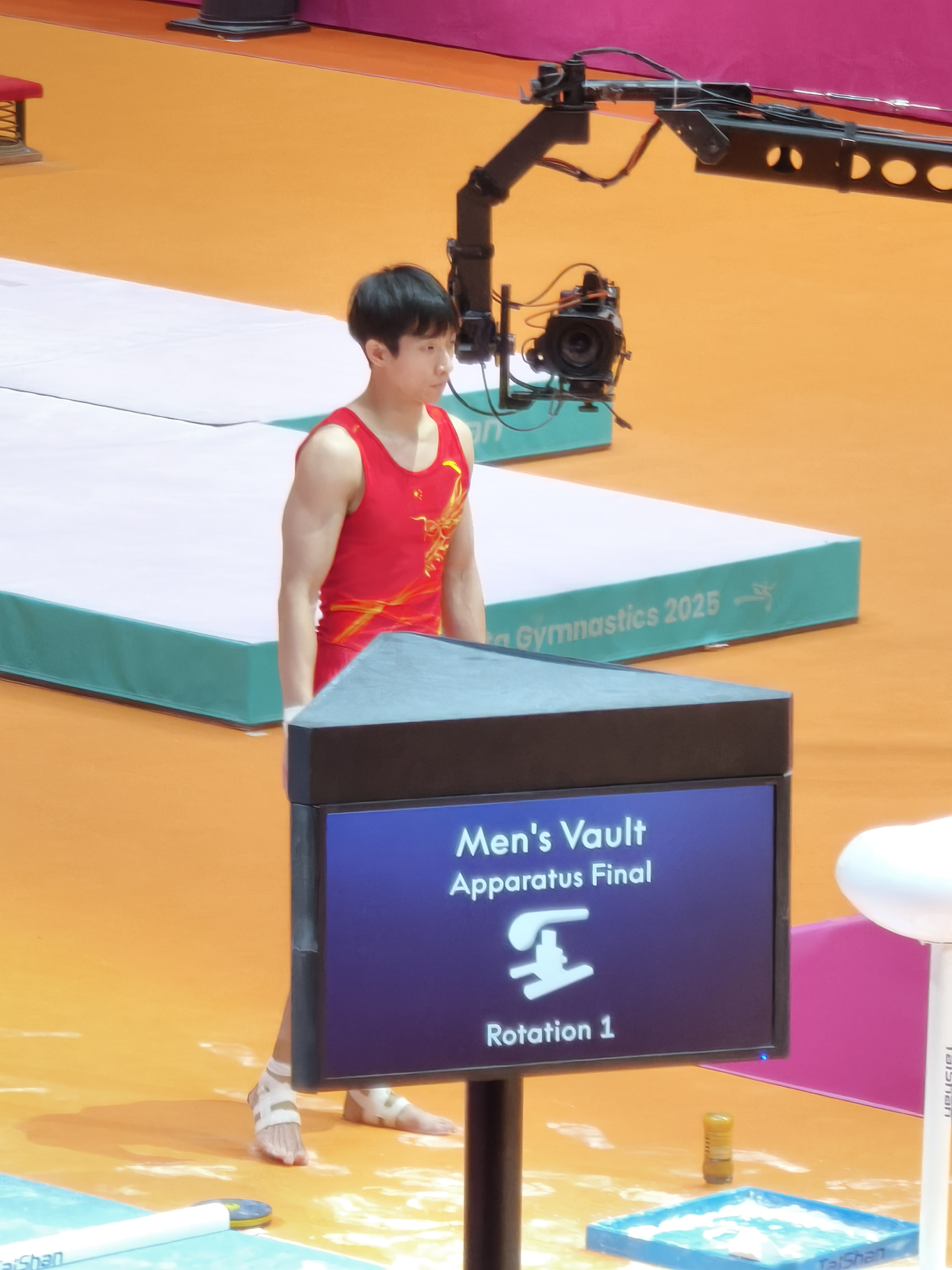
- Huang in 2025

Personal information
- Born: 13 July 1997 (age 29) Guangxi, China

Gymnastics career
- Discipline: Men's artistic gymnastics
- Country represented: China
- Club: Guangxi Province
- Head coach: Qin Wei
Medal record
Men's artistic gymnastics
Representing China
Asian Championships
Gold medal – first place	2019 Ulaanbaatar	Team
Gold medal – first place	2019 Ulaanbaatar	Vault
Silver medal – second place	2025 Jecheon	Team
Silver medal – second place	2025 Jecheon	Vault
FIG World Cup
Event	1st	2nd	3rd
Apparatus World Cup	0	1	0
World Challenge Cup	1	0	0
Total	1	1	0

Huang Mingqi (born 13 July 1997) is a Chinese artistic gymnast. He primarily competes as a vault specialist and is the 2019 Asian champion on the apparatus. He is also the 2025 Asian silver medalist and a 2025 World finalist on the vault.

== Gymnastics career ==
Huang began gymnastics when he was four years old. At the junior level, he won a gold medal on the floor exercise, a silver medal on the parallel bars, and a bronze medal on the horizontal bar at the 2014 Pacific Rim Championships.

At the 2016 Doha World Challenge Cup, Huang won the gold medal on the vault. He won the vault silver medal at the 2018 Cottbus World Cup, behind Igor Radivilov. At the 2018 Chinese Championships, he won the vault title and placed seventh on the horizontal bar. He was a member of the Chinese team that won the 2019 Asian Championships, where he also won the vault title. He won a silver medal on the vault at the 2019 Chinese Championships.

Huang was an alternate for the 2020 Summer Olympics. He won the vault titles at the 2021 and 2024 Chinese Championships.

Huang won the vault silver medal at the 2025 Baku World Cup, behind Nazar Chepurnyi. He also won the vault silver medal at the 2025 Asian Championships, where China also won the team silver medal. He won the vault and horizontal bar titles at the 2025 Chinese Championships. He was then selected to represent China at the 2025 World Artistic Gymnastics Championships in Jakarta, Indonesia, and qualified for the vault final. He ultimately finished in fifth place with an average score of 14.416.
