= Yan Mingyong =

Chinese artistic gymnast

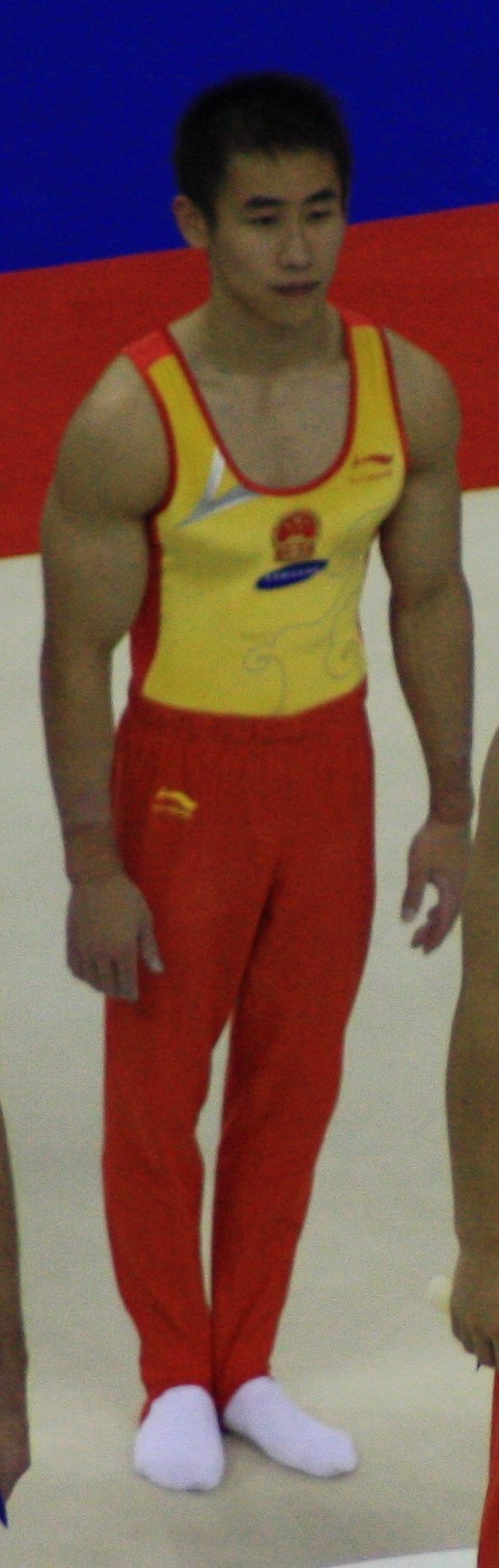
- Born: 24 March 1985 (age 41)

Gymnastics career
- Country represented: China
Medal record
Representing China
World Championships
Gold medal – first place	2009 London	Rings
Gold medal – first place	2010 Rotterdam	Team
Gold medal – first place	2011 Tokyo	Team
Silver medal – second place	2010 Rotterdam	Rings
Asian Games
Gold medal – first place	2010 Guangzhou	Team
Silver medal – second place	2010 Guangzhou	Pommel horse
Silver medal – second place	2010 Guangzhou	Rings
National Games
Gold medal – first place	2009 Jinan	Rings
Gold medal – first place	2013 Liaoning	Rings
Silver medal – second place	2017 Tianjin	Rings
Bronze medal – third place	2005 Nanjing	Rings

Yan Mingyong (simplified Chinese: 严明勇; traditional Chinese: 嚴明勇; pinyin: Yán Míngyǒng; born 24 March 1985) is a retired Chinese artistic gymnast. He competed at the 2009 World Artistic Gymnastics Championships in London and won gold, becoming world champion in the still rings event. The following year he returned to the World Championship scene in Rotterdam, and at the 2010 World Artistic Gymnastics Championships he won a silver medal in the still rings event alongside the gold medal China's national squad who won that year in the team competition.
