= Zhang Hongtao =

Chinese artistic gymnast

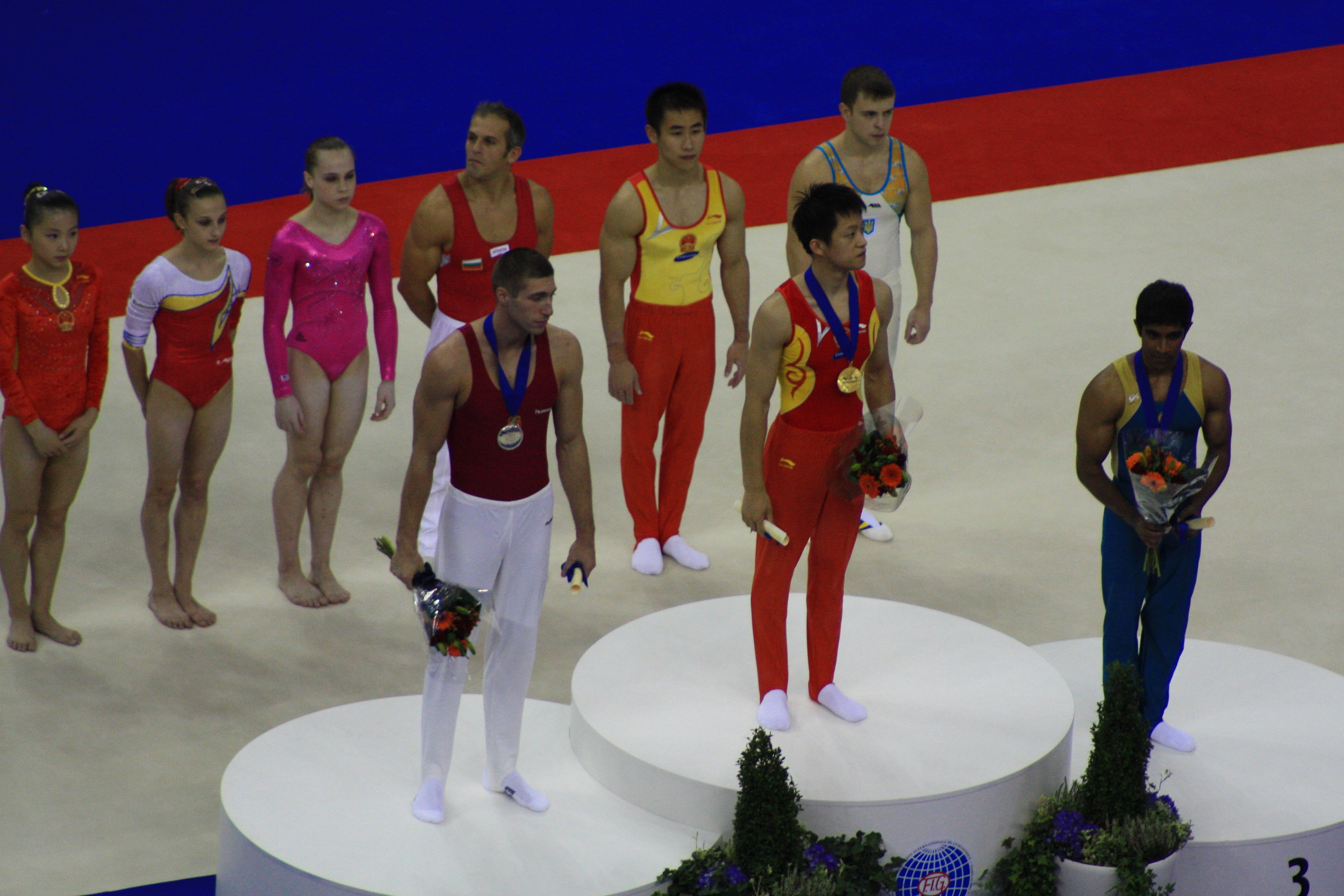
- Full name: Zhang Hongtao
- Born: 9 April 1986 (age 40) Xi'an, Shaanxi, China
- Height: 1.65 m (5 ft 5 in)

Gymnastics career
- Discipline: Men's artistic gymnastics
- Country represented: China; (2005–present)
Medal record
World Championships
Gold medal – first place	2009 London	Pommel horse
World Cup
Gold medal – first place	2007 Moscow	Pommel horse
Gold medal – first place	2008 Maribor	Pommel horse
Gold medal – first place	2008 Barcelona	Pommel horse
Gold medal – first place	2008 Ostrava	Pommel horse
Gold medal – first place	2008 Stuttgart	Pommel horse
Gold medal – first place	2008 Madrid	Pommel horse
Gold medal – first place	2009 Osijek	Pommel horse
Gold medal – first place	2009 Stuttgart	Pommel horse
Gold medal – first place	2009 Croatia	Pommel horse
Silver medal – second place	2008 Doha	Pommel horse
Bronze medal – third place	2007 Maribor	Pommel horse
National Games
Silver medal – second place	2009 Jinan	Pommel horse
Silver medal – second place	2013 Liaoning	Pommel horse
Bronze medal – third place	2005 Nanjing	Pommel horse

Zhang Hongtao (Chinese: 张宏涛; born 9 April 1986), is a Chinese gymnast. He is a specialist in the pommel horse.

== Gymnastics career ==
In Chinese national-level competition, Zhang has made many achievements for the Shanghai team. He earned a bronze medal in pommel horse at the 10th Chinese national games and was selected a national team member since then. He also won gold in the 2007 national championships, and a silver on the same apparatus at the 11th Chinese national games in 2009, behind multiple world pommel horse champion Xiao Qin.

Zhang's first international competition was the 2005 World Artistic Gymnastics Championships. He qualified 3rd into the pommel horse event final with a score of 9.712. In the event final, he scored 9.475 and finished 6th in pommel horse. In 2009, Zhang became the world champion in pommel horse in the 2009 World Artistic Gymnastics Championships, qualified first into the event final and finished with a score of 16.200.
