= Zhang Chenglong =

Chinese artistic gymnast

- Full name: Zhang Chenglong
- Born: May 12, 1989 (age 37)
- Height: 173 cm (5 ft 8 in)

Gymnastics career
- Discipline: Men's artistic gymnastics
- Country represented: China
- Club: National Team
- Head coach: Huang Yubin
- Assistant coach: Chen Xiong
Medal record
Representing China
Olympic Games
Gold medal – first place	2012 London	Team
Bronze medal – third place	2016 Rio de Janeiro	Team
World Championships
Gold medal – first place	2010 Rotterdam	Team
Gold medal – first place	2010 Rotterdam	High Bar
Gold medal – first place	2011 Tokyo	Team
Gold medal – first place	2014 Nanning	Team
Silver medal – second place	2011 Tokyo	Parallel Bars
Silver medal – second place	2011 Tokyo	High Bar
Bronze medal – third place	2015 Glasgow	Team
Asian Games
Gold medal – first place	2010 Guangzhou	Team
Gold medal – first place	2010 Guangzhou	Floor Exercise
Gold medal – first place	2010 Guangzhou	Horizontal Bar

Zhang Chenglong (Chinese: 张成龙; pinyin: Zhāng Chénglóng; born May 12, 1989) is a Chinese gymnast.

He competed for the national team at the 2012 Summer Olympics in the Men's artistic team all-around and helped win the team gold medal.

== Gymnastics career ==
At both the 2010 World Artistic Gymnastics Championships, in Rotterdam, and 2010 Asian Games, in Guangzhou, Zhang won gold with the Chinese Team, and was able to also win gold at the horizontal bar, in both international events, and gold at the floor exercise. Zou Kai, the Olympic and World Champion in these events, was left out of the team that year.

At the 2011 World Artistic Gymnastics Championships, in Tokyo, he again won gold in the Team competition, but could not retain his title on the horizontal bar, finishing second in the final to Zou Kai, who recaptured his title in that event. He also tied for second on parallel bars.

=== Summer Olympics ===
At the 2012 Summer Olympics, Zhang helped the Chinese team win the gold medal in the Men's artistic team all-around. He also competed in event finals of horizontal bar and parallel bars but finished off the podium in both events.

At the 2016 Olympics, he was part of the Chinese team that won bronze in the men's team event.

== See also ==
- China at the 2012 Summer Olympics
