= Liu Jinru =

Chinese artistic gymnast

- Born: 13 October 2000 (age 26)

Gymnastics career
- Discipline: Women's artistic gymnastics
- Country represented: China
Medal record
World Championships
| Bronze medal – third place | 2018 Doha | Team |
Asian Games
| Gold medal – first place | 2018 Jakarta | Team |
Asian Championships
| Gold medal – first place | 2017 Bangkok | Team |
| Gold medal – first place | 2017 Bangkok | Vault |
National Games
| Bronze medal – third place | 2025 Guangdong | Vault |

Liu Jinru (Chinese: 刘津茹; pinyin: Liú Jīnrú; born October 13, 2000, in Guangdong) is a Chinese artistic gymnast. She is a 2018 World Championships team bronze medalist.

== Career ==
=== Junior ===
Liu began training in gymnastics at age seven. She became a national team member in 2012.

=== Senior ===
In 2016, Liu competed at the Cottbus World Challenge Cup, finishing eighth in vault. The same year, she finished first in vault and eighth in floor exercise at the Szombathely World Challenge Cup.

In 2017, Liu was eighth in the all-around at the London World Cup. She won gold in vault and in the team competition at the Bangkok Asian Championships.

In 2018, Liu won team gold at the Jakarta Asian Games, finishing 16th in floor exercise, 22nd in vault and 45th in individual all-around. At the Melbourne World Cup, she finished fifth in vault. At the Doha World Cup, she was fifth in vault and ninth in floor exercise. At the Doha World Championships, she won team bronze - alongside Chen Yile, Liu Tingting, Luo Huan and Zhang Jin - and finished sixth in vault.

== Recognition ==
Liu was named an Elite Athlete of National Class in 2014, before being named an Elite Athlete of International Class in 2019 by the General Administration of Sport in China.
