= Australian rules football in China =

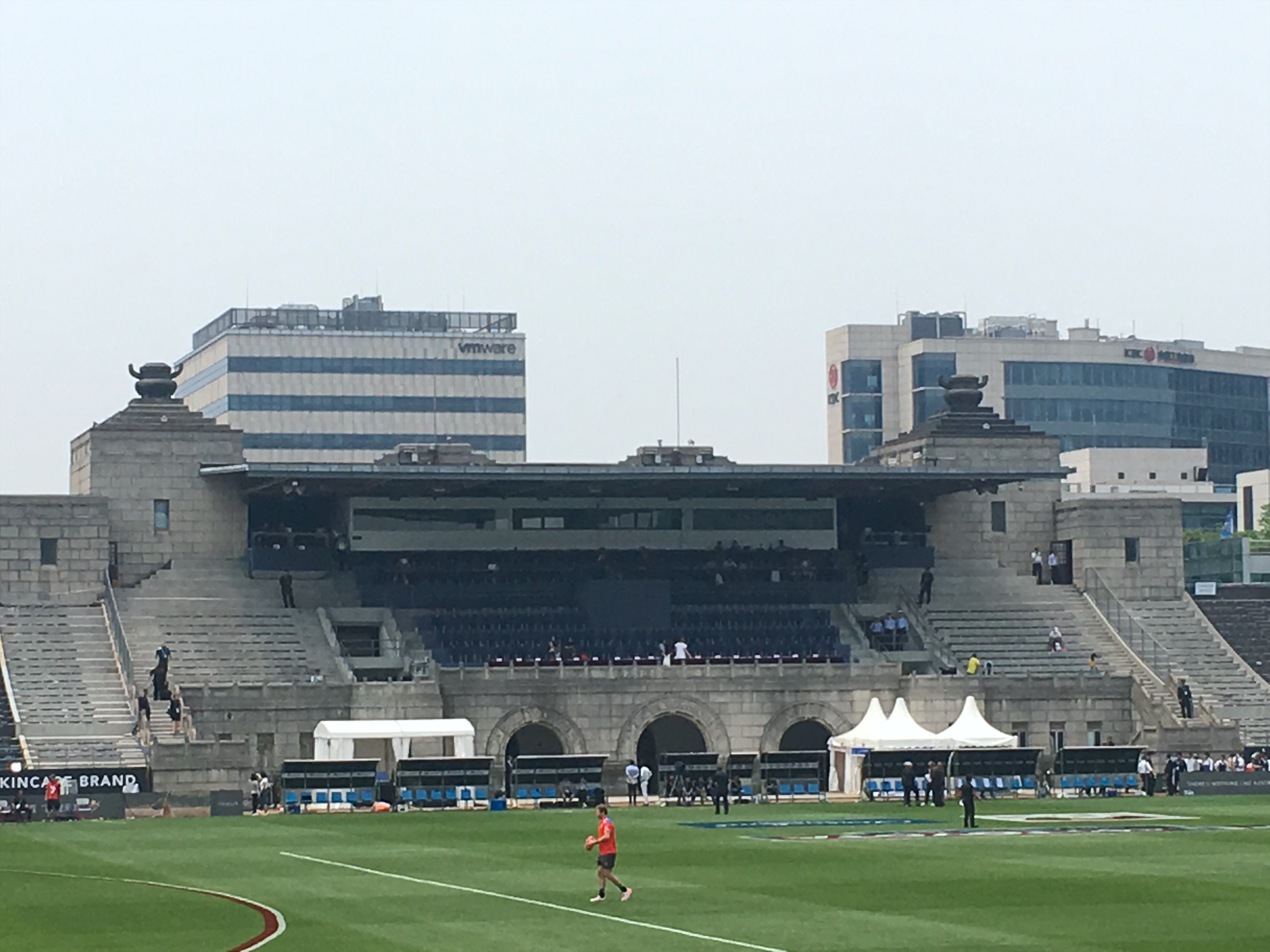
- Jiangwan Stadium the venue for the first Australian Football League matches played in China
- Country: People's Republic of China
- Governing body: AFL China
- National team: People's Republic of China
- First played: 1989, Hong Kong
- Registered players: 2,919 (2021)

Audience records
- Single match: 10,689 (2018). Port Adelaide v. Gold Coast (Jiangwan Stadium)

Australian rules football in China has been played since 1989 and grew in popularity in the 2010s.

Interest in Australian football in China received a boost after the AFL, the premier professional football competition in Australia, invested in an AFL exhibition match in Shanghai in 2010, and followed up with an AFL academy in 2011. Further investment has followed from other interests including the construction of a dedicated AFL oval in Tianjin in 2011. The AFL Commission designed AFLX in 2017 as a means to promote the sport in China. It scheduled a series of AFL Premiership matches was played at Jiangwan Stadium from 2017 to 2019, the first outside of Pacific, which attracted an average attendance of 10,073.

The local state TV network began broadcasting matches from Australia in 2016. The 2019 AFL Grand Final was watched by a record 5.67 million viewers. Star Sports has since broadcast AFL there.

There are a number of senior clubs spread throughout China, including in the bigger cities of Beijing, Shanghai, Guangzhou and Tianjin, as well as Auskick programs in other cities such as Suzhou, Jiangsu province.

The national team, composed solely of Chinese nationals, is known as the China (Dragons or Reds). It won the Asian Australian Football Championships All-Asia Cup in 2017 and 2018 and achieved its best international result of 13th at the 2017 Australian Football International Cup.

== Clubs & Competitions ==
=== Local Leagues ===
Competition	Region	First season	Teams	Notes
Guangdong Australian Football League (GDAFL)	Guangdong (Guangzhou, Dongguan and Huizhou)	2014	5	Guangdong AFL
South China Australian Football League (SCAFL)	Hong Kong	2015	4	South China AFL

=== Clubs ===
Club	City	Founded	Notes
Beijing Bombers	Beijing	2003	Beijing Bombers
Dongguan Panther Blues (China Blues)	Dongguan	2011	
Hong Kong Dragons	Hong Kong	1989	Hong Kong Dragons
Guangzhou Scorpions	Guangzhou	2010	Guangzhou Scorpions
Macau Lightning	Macau	2010	Macau Lightning
Shanghai Tigers	Shanghai	2002	Shanghai Tigers

== History ==
Chinese Australians have been playing Australian rules football since the late 19th century. In 1882, 17-year-old Henry George Chin Kit made his debut for the Ironbark Football Club against Charing Cross in the Bendigo Football League. The Ballarat Chinese Football Premiership was covered extensively between 1892 and 1896, in local newspapers.

A widely published 1939 editorial highlighted a very positive response to the game from a group of visiting Chinese delegates, one of which proposed that China should adopt the game.

The first recorded match in Hong Kong was in 1939 played by the Royal Australian Navy. At least two papers posted positive reviews of the matches:

"Given a big ground and normal conditions, the Australian rules game should prove popular with football followers and it would not come as a surprise to see the Chinese adopt this game which is a combination of football (meaning soccer), rugby and basketball."

"it was a great im provement on rugby union football, and the game showed what an immense difference in speed there would be in rugby union if scrums were disallowed."

Matches were played by Australian Naval Reservists in 1940, there was hope that local Chinese would take up the game. In July 1940, a match was played at Kowloon at the Police Club grounds.

=== Late 20th Century ===
In 1984 the South Australian National Football League announced a plan to sell rights to its matches to China to an audience of around 70 million including translations.

The Hong Kong Dragons Australian expatriate team was formed in 1990, and have been one of Asia's most successful Australian rules football clubs since this time. The Dragons play against other Asian teams regularly and have competed at all Asian Australian Football Championships to date. Auskick, the Australian football program for juniors, grew in Hong Kong in the early 2000s after two Victorian expatriate families managed to secure official support and equipment from the AFL in Australia. The Dragons also coordinate an Auskick juniors program. Players trained at the iconic grounds at Happy Valley as well as the Australian International School Hong Kong (AISHK).

A junior program called the Gobi Desert AFL existed at a primary school in Hami, Xinjiang in the 1990s, but this has now disappeared.

A club was established in Shanghai under the name of the Shanghai Tigers in 2002. The Tigers have a playing list consisting mainly of expatriate Australians, with some British, American and South African players as well.

Australian rules was first played in Beijing in 2004, with the foundation of the Australian Expatriate team, the Beijing Bombers.

In city of Suzhou in 2007, 18 schools had introduced the sport into their curriculum.

The sister city relationship between Tianjin and Melbourne saw the beginnings of football development in 2005. By 2007, a development organisation called the AFL China had been formed, with Tianjin Normal University having two Australian football teams at its main campuses. The Tianjin program was sponsored by the Melbourne Football Club and the Melbourne City Council, through links formed by former Melbourne Lord Mayor John So.

The Beijing Bombers played an annual China Cup series against the other Australian expatriate team the Shanghai Tigers, as well as starting a 3-team metro league known as the Beijing AFL in 2009.

Australian football began in Macau in 2009, with the introduction of Auskick and matches at the International School of Macau. The Macau Lightning Australian expatriate senior team debuted in 2010, with matches against the Hong Kong Dragons and Pokfulam Vikings. They made their first Asian Championships appearance in Shanghai in October 2010, but failed to win any matches at the tournament.

A second Australian expatriate team in the Pokfulam region of Hong Kong was in existence in 2010, playing as the Pokfulam Vikings and conducting some matches against the Dragons.

The Guangzhou Scorpions Australian expatriate team was formed in 2010, playing matches against the Hong Kong Dragons and Macau Lightning.

In late 2011 into early 2012 Darrell Egan Founded the Dongguan Panther Blues team at a middle school in Humen Dongguan. The team is also known in Australia as the China Blues consists of 15 to 18 years old student players, with some old school players up to the age of 20. The team went on to play Chinese teams of locals which formed in mid 2013 and is now coached under team's original captain Lin Honghue (Leighton Lin). Darrell Egan now acts as the team's Australian Liaison manager. The Dongguan Panther Blues established the first Chinese team of locals in China in 2014. Carlton Blues player Wally Koochew (See Below) being a pioneer as the first Chinese player in VFL/AFL history the Dongguan Blues team are also the pioneers in China.

In 2016 Port Adelaide FC signed born and raised 2014 International Cup captain Chen Shaoliang to its International Scholarship list Shaoliang played reserves matches with Port Adelaide in the SANFL however was not elevated to the club's AFL list.

== National team ==
China
- Nickname(s): Dragons
- Governing body: AFL China

Rankings
- Current: 13th (as of October 2022)

International Cup
- Appearances: 4 (first in 2008)
- Best result: 13th (2017)

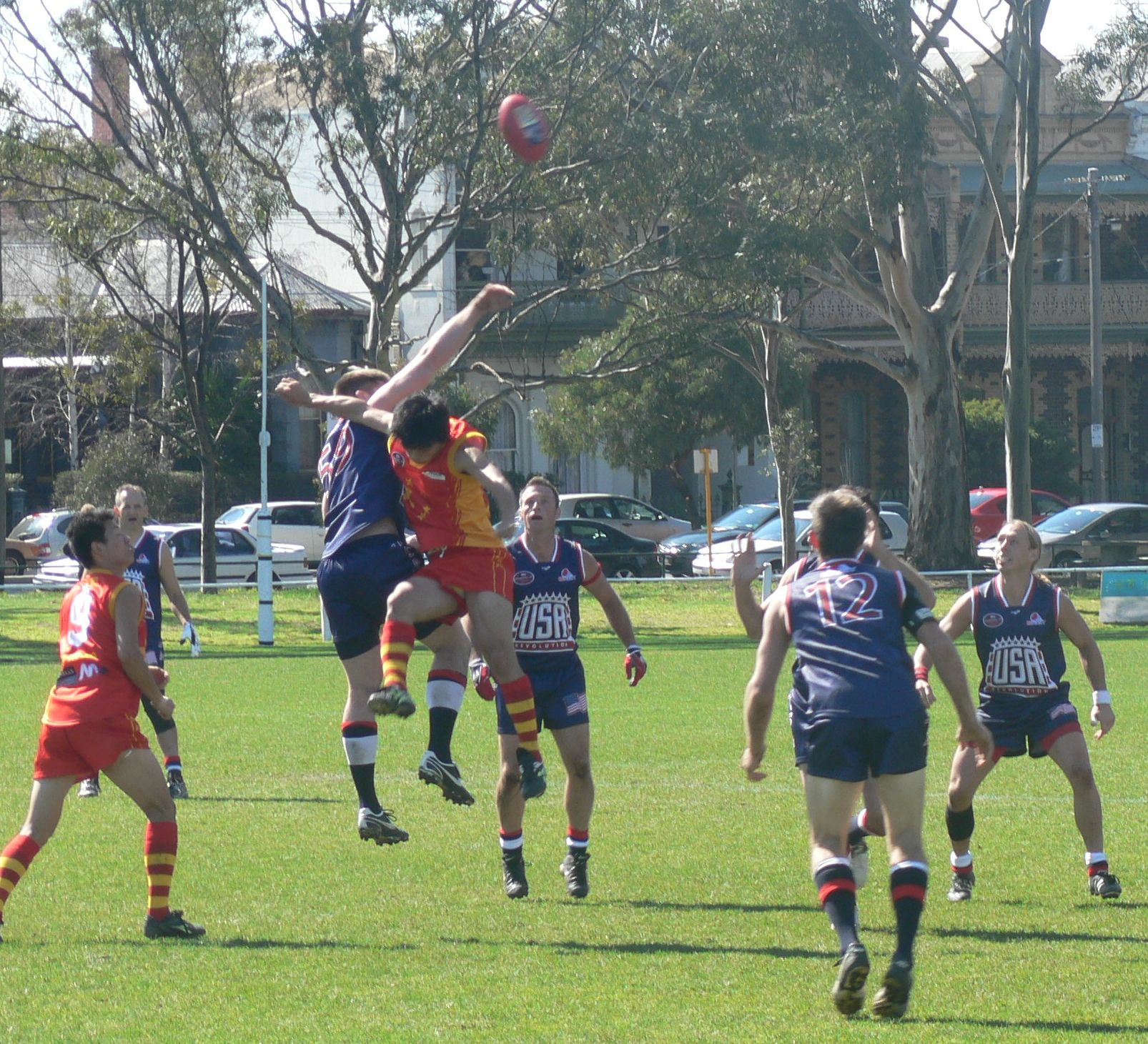
China's Red Demons take on the US at IC08

A representative team mainly consisting of expat Australians in China has competed under the names China Blues and China Reds in International fixtures and Asian AFL Championships. The first national representative team composed entirely of Chinese nationals appeared as the China Red Demons at the 2008 Australian Football International Cup. Bo Gee Lu, a native of Guangdong played Australian Rules Football while studying at the University of Adelaide and went on to represent China with significant esteem in a number of International Cups, mostly as a midfielder/forward or pinch hitting in the Ruck.

=== International Cup ===
Australian Football International Cup

- 2008: 15th
- 2011: 5th (Division Two)
- 2014: 4th (Division Two)
- 2017: 3rd (Division Two)

== Players ==
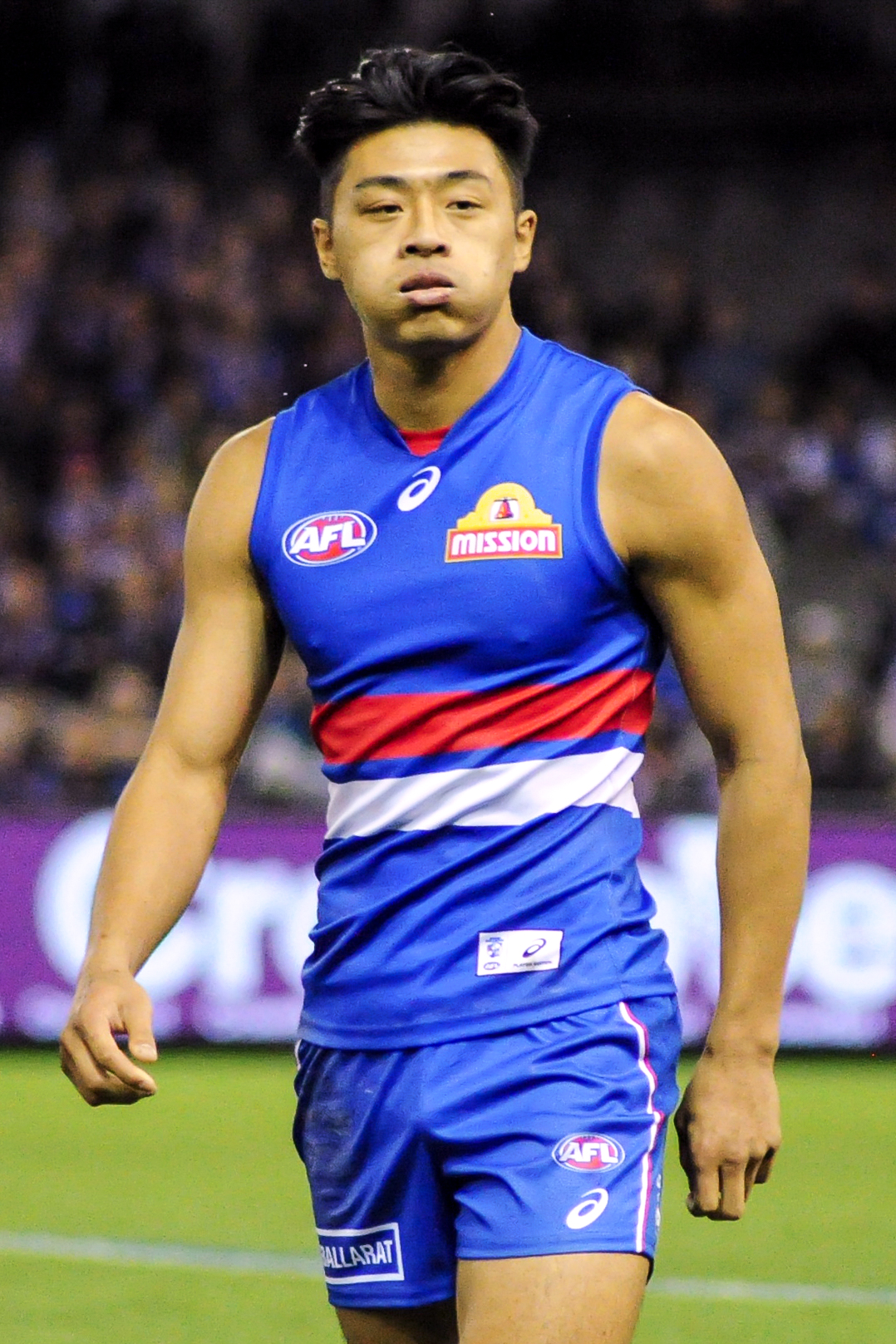
Lin Jong playing for the Western Bulldogs in 2018

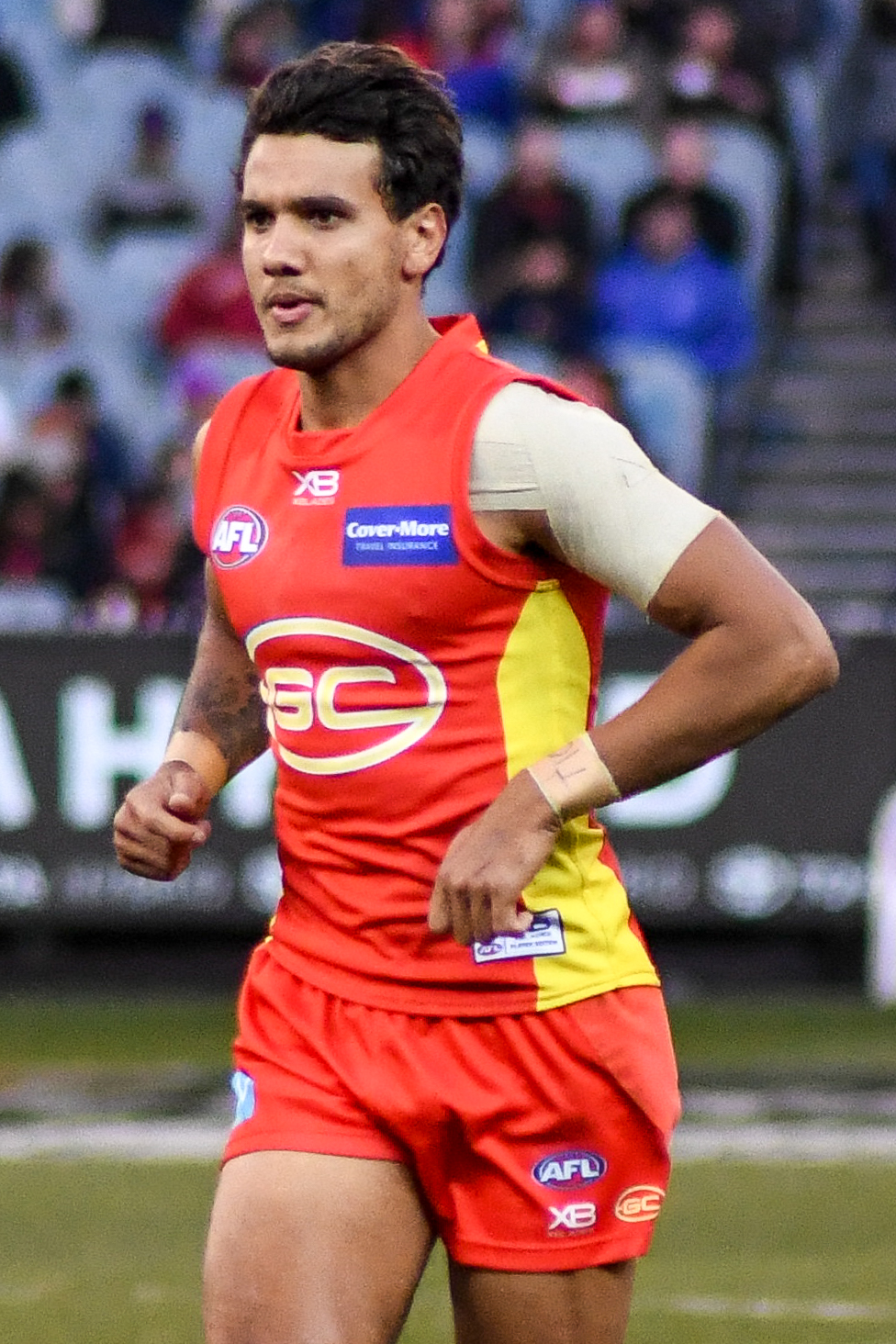
Callum Ah Chee playing for the Gold Coast Football Club in 2018

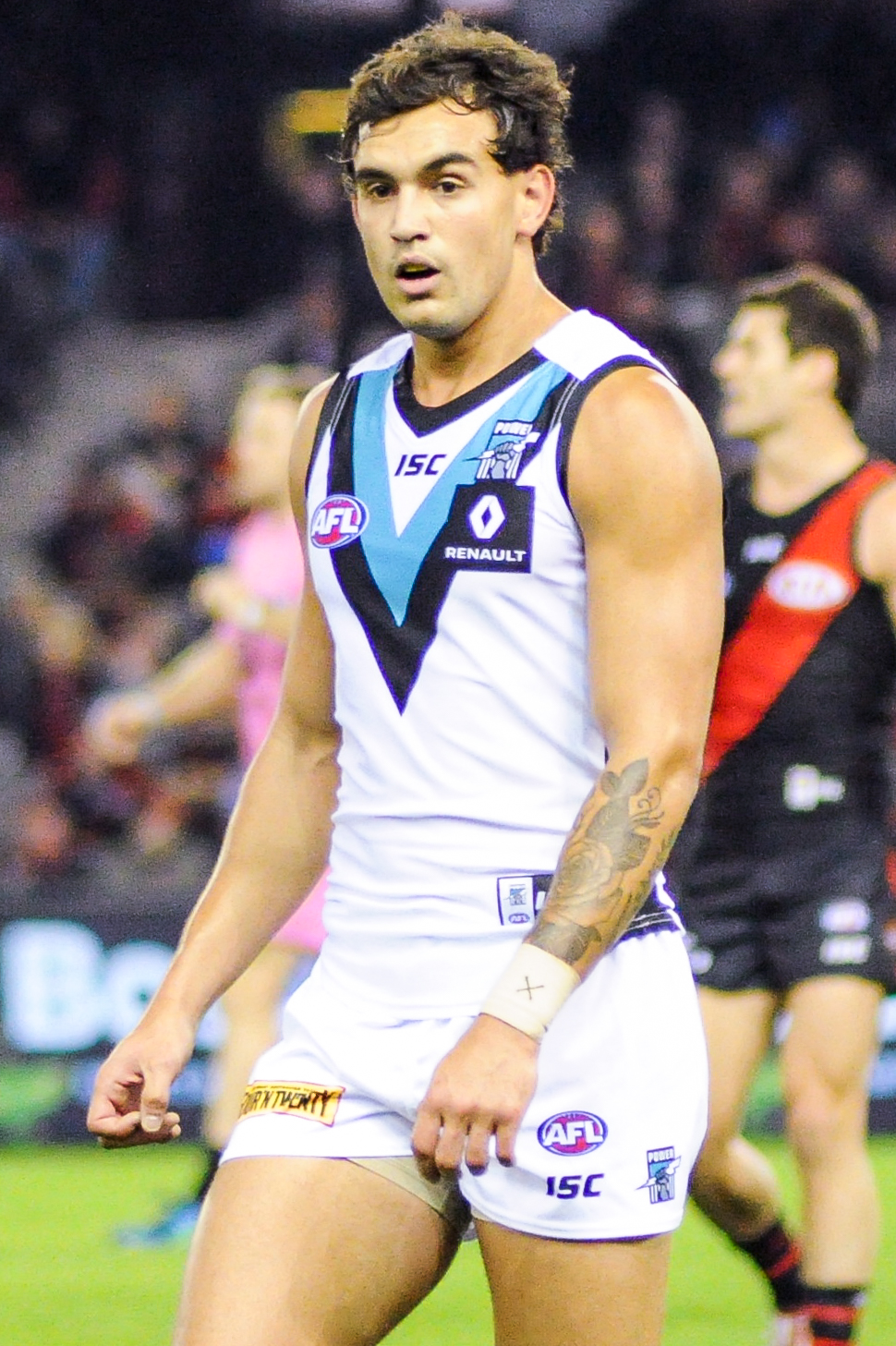
Brendon Ah Chee playing for the Port Adelaide Football Club in 2017

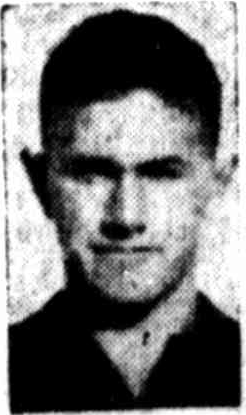
Jack Wunhym in 1933

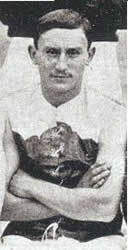
Wally Koochew of the Carlton Football Club in 1908
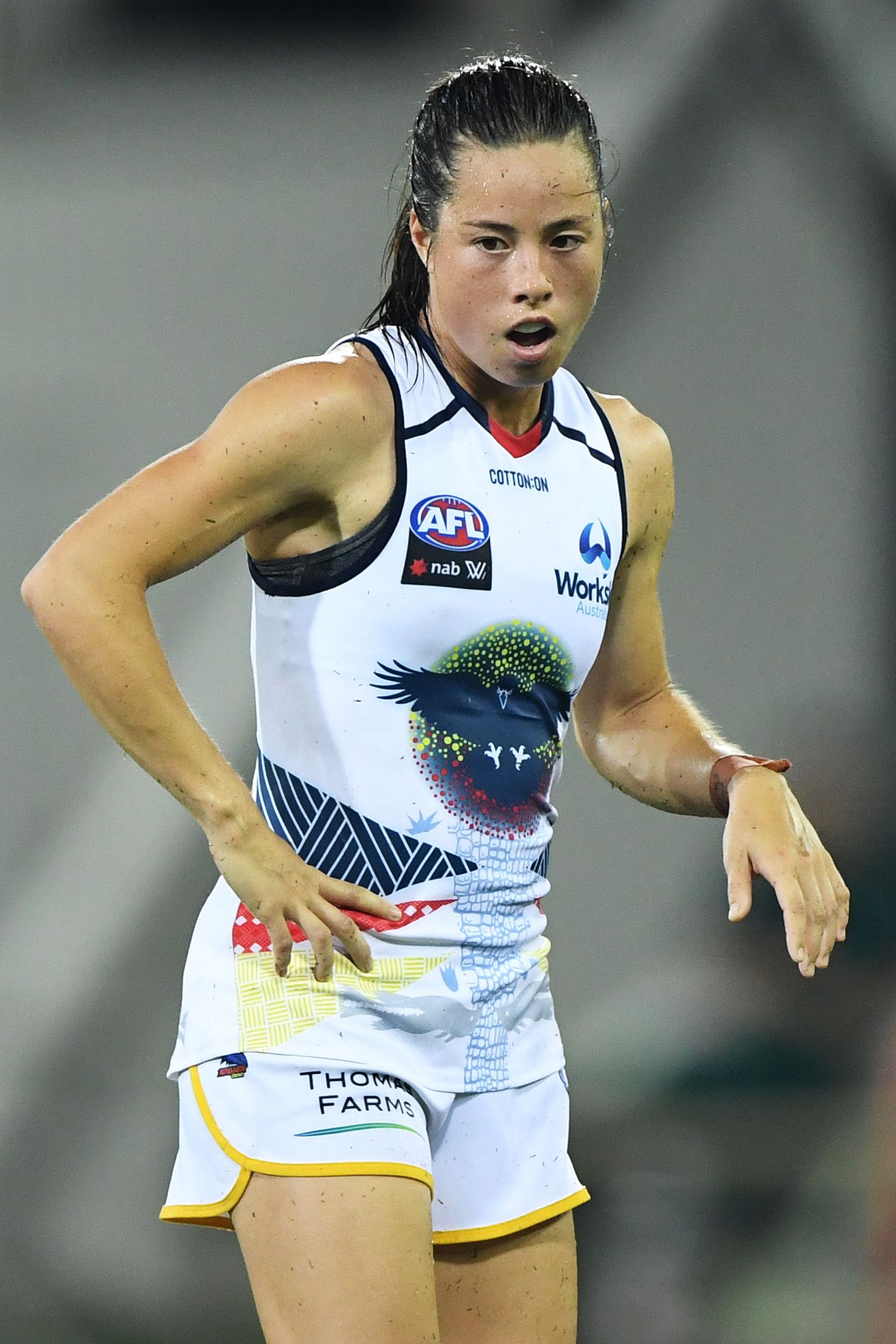
Sophie Li playing for Adelaide Football Club in 2019

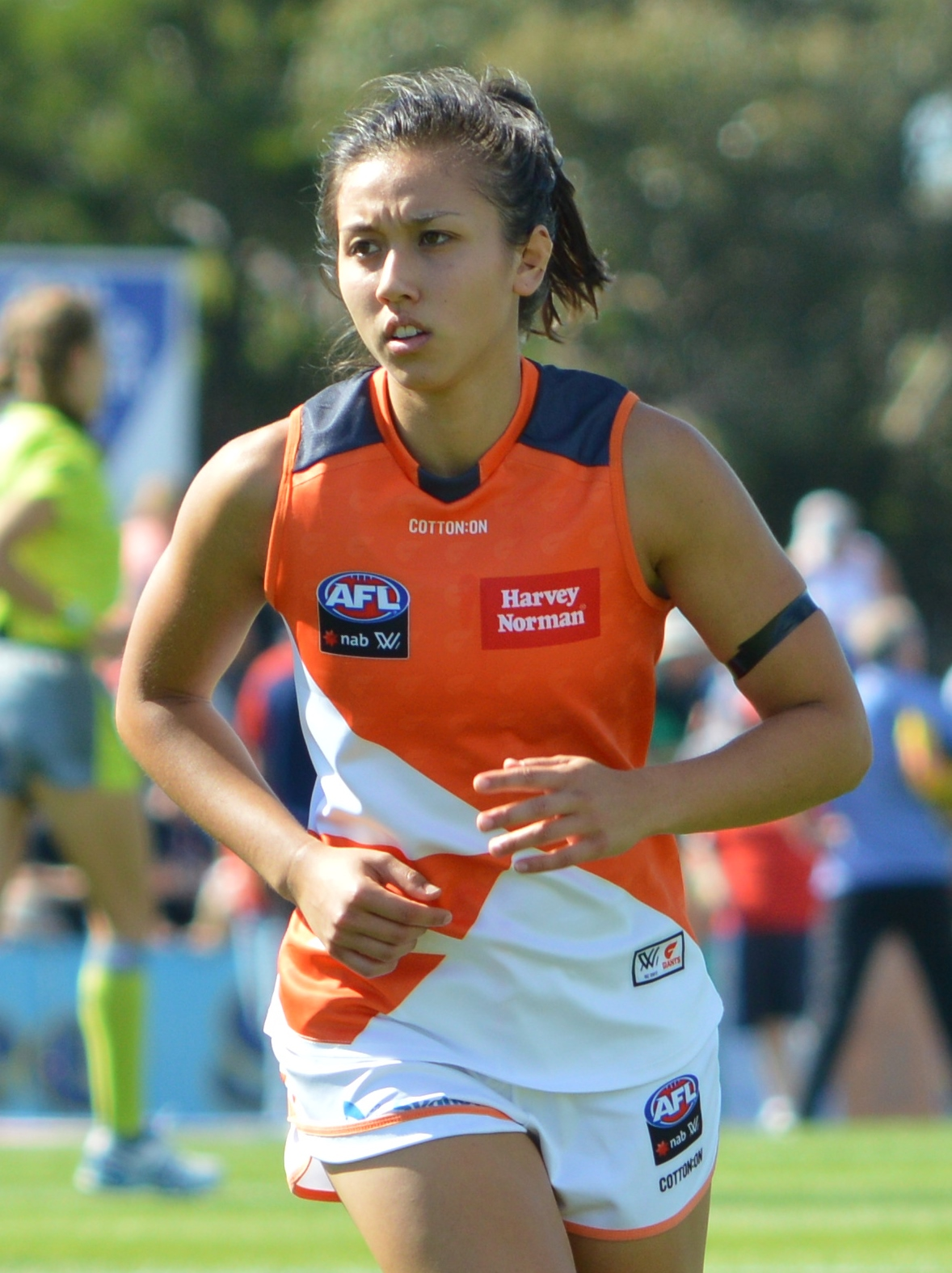
Rebecca Beeson playing for GWS Giants in 2018

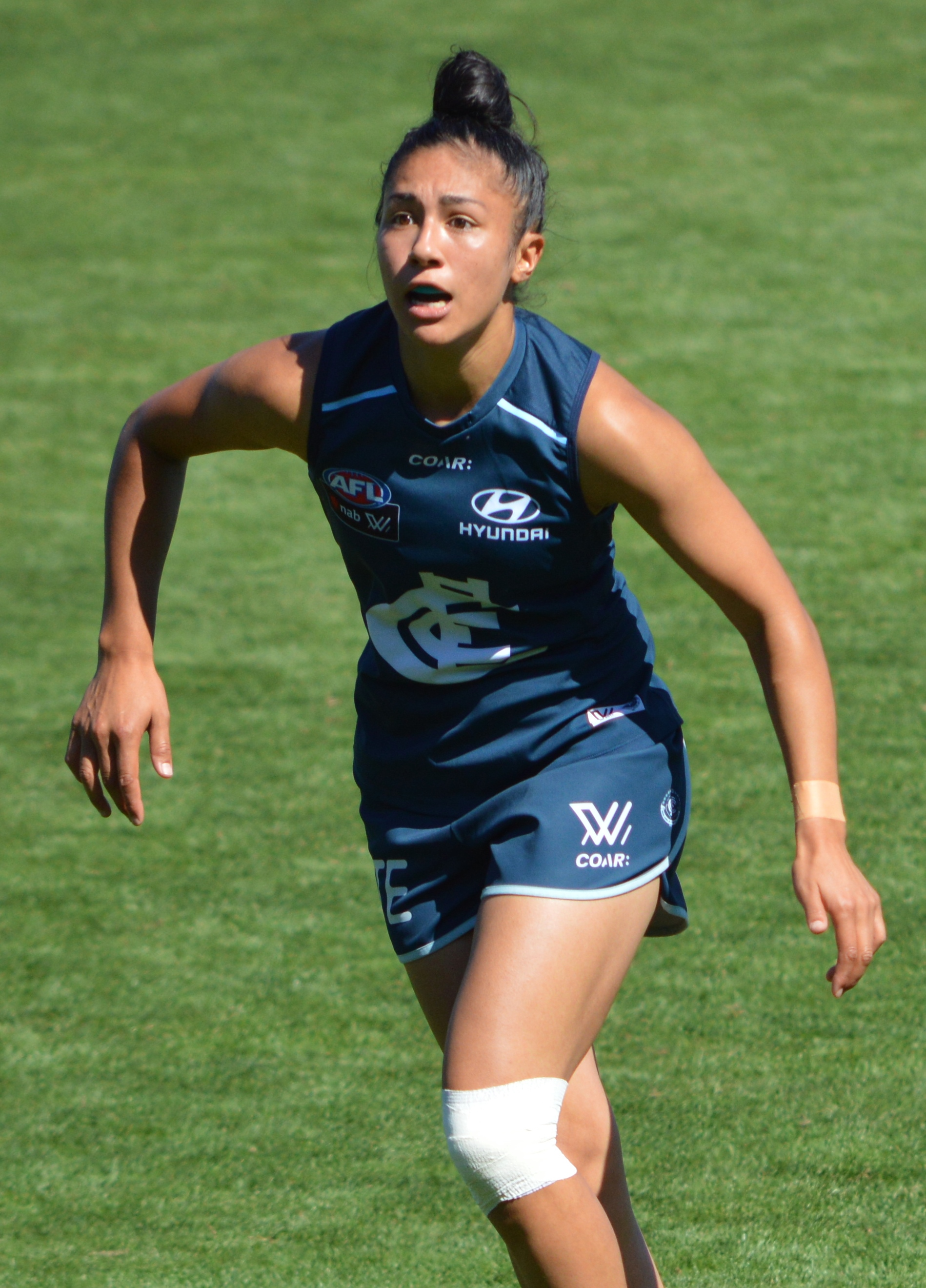
Darcy Vescio playing for the Carlton Football Club in 2017

Currently on an AFL senior list

Player	AFL Years*	AFL Matches*	AFL Goals	Clubs played for/plays for	Connections to China, Notes
Connor Downie	2021-2022	2	0	Hawthorn FC	Mother
Cameron Polson	2017-2020	19	4	Carlton FC	Born in Hong Kong
Callum Ah Chee	2016-	105	42	Gold Coast FC, Brisbane Lions	Great-grandfather
Lin Jong	2012-2021	65	33	Western Bulldogs	Father
Brendon Ah Chee	2012-2021	58	31	Port Adelaide FC	Great Grandfather
Michael Long	1989–2001	190	143	Essendon FC	Great Grandparent First AFL premiership player in 1993 (2 premierhips total).
Dannie Seow	1986–1990	25	10	Collingwood FC, Melbourne FC	Father
Neale Fong	1978-1999	-		West Perth (WAFL)	Parents. Member of the WA football hall of fame.
Les Fong	1973-1985	-		West Perth (WAFL)	Parents. West Perth's longest-serving captain (1980–85). Selected for six State of Origin games for the Western Australian team, including the first such game (1977).
Ian Chinn	1940-1942	17	28	South Melbourne FC	
Jack Wunhym	1927-29	10	1	Footscray FC	Father
Les Kew Ming	1922	-		North Melbourne FC (VFA)	Parents
Ernie Foo	1914	4	2	St Kilda FC	Parents
George Tansing	1908	5	2	Geelong FC	Father
Wally Koochew	1908	4	2	Carlton FC	Father

Currently on an AFLW senior list

Player	AFLW Years*	AFLW Matches*	AFLW Goals*	Clubs played for/plays for	Connections to China, Notes
Amanda Ling	2022-	2	-	Western Bulldogs	Parents
Joanna Lin	2021-	17	4	Collingwood FC	Taiwanese parents.
Sophie Li	2018-20	21	1	Adelaide FC	Parent First AFLW premiership player in 2019.
Darcy Vescio	2017-	58	55	Carlton FC	Parent
Rebecca Beeson	2017-	41	7	Greater Western Sydney	Parent
