= Lauren Mitchell =

Australian artistic gymnast (born 1991)

Lauren Mitchell OAM
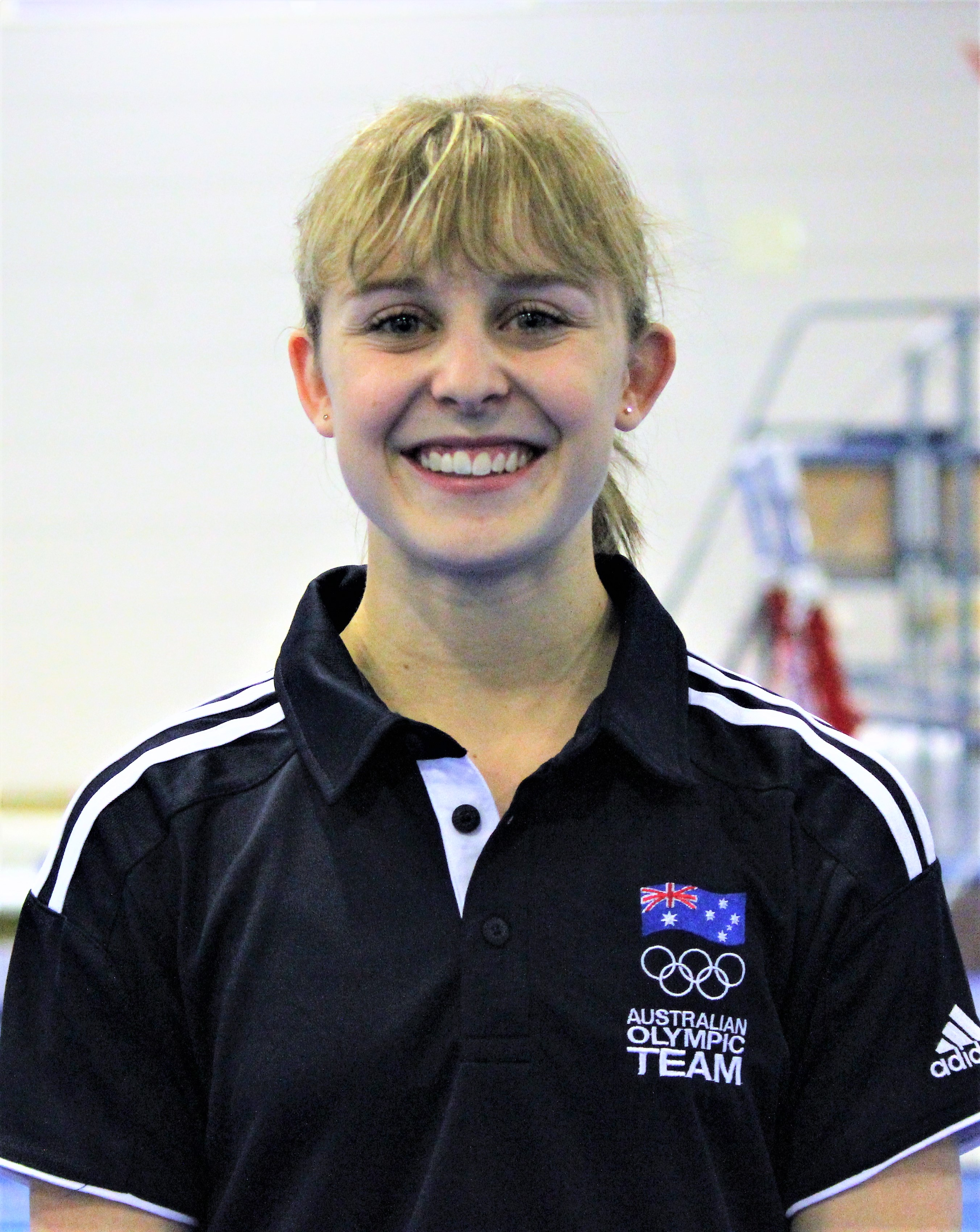
- Mitchell in 2012

Personal information
- Full name: Lauren Stephanie Mitchell
- Born: 23 July 1991 (age 35) Subiaco, Western Australia

Gymnastics career
- Discipline: Women's artistic gymnastics
- Country represented: Australia; (2007–2016)
- Club: Western Australian Institute of Sport
- Head coaches: Nikolai Lapchine; Martine George
- Eponymous skills: Balance Beam and Floor Exercise: triple turn (1080°) in tuck stand on one leg – free leg optional
- Retired: 27 September 2016
Medal record
Representing Australia
World Championships
| Gold medal – first place | 2010 Rotterdam | Floor exercise |
| Silver medal – second place | 2009 London | Balance beam |
| Silver medal – second place | 2009 London | Floor exercise |
World Cup Final
| Gold medal – first place | 2008 Madrid | Balance beam |
Commonwealth Games
| Gold medal – first place | 2010 Delhi | Team |
| Gold medal – first place | 2010 Delhi | All-around |
| Gold medal – first place | 2010 Delhi | Uneven bars |
| Gold medal – first place | 2010 Delhi | Balance beam |
| Silver medal – second place | 2010 Delhi | Floor exercise |
| Silver medal – second place | 2014 Glasgow | Team |
| Silver medal – second place | 2014 Glasgow | Floor exercise |
FIG World Cup
| Event | 1st | 2nd | 3rd |
|---|---|---|---|
| Apparatus World Cup | 5 | 3 | 2 |
| World Challenge Cup | 1 | 0 | 1 |
| Total | 6 | 3 | 3 |

Lauren Stephanie Mitchell OAM (born 23 July 1991) is an Australian former artistic gymnast. She is the 2010 World champion on the floor exercise and the 2009 World Championships silver medalist on the balance beam and floor exercise. Mitchell is only the second Australian female gymnast to win a medal at the World Championships, and she is the first to win a gold medal. She is the 2010 Commonwealth Games champion in the all-around, uneven bars, and balance beam, and with the Australian team, and she is the 2008 World Cup Final balance beam champion. She also represented Australia at the 2008 and 2012 Olympic Games.

In her first year of senior competition, Mitchell qualified for the balance beam event final at the 2007 World Championships. Then at the 2008 Summer Olympics, she helped the Australian team place sixth, their highest finish ever. She then became the first Australian gymnast to win more than one medal at the same World Championships when she won two silver medals in 2009. The next year, she tied the record for the most gold medals won by a female gymnast at a single Commonwealth Games and became Australia's first female World champion in gymnastics. At her second Olympic Games in 2012, she qualified for the floor exercise final and finished fifth. She won two more Commonwealth medals in 2014, silver with the team and on the floor exercise. Mitchell retired from gymnastics in 2016 as Australia's most decorated gymnast.

== Early life ==
Lauren Mitchell was born on 23 July 1991 in Subiaco, an inner suburb of Perth, to Leanne and Graeme Mitchell, and she is the oldest of four siblings. She is of Romanian descent through her mother. She began gymnastics when she was six years old after a gymnastics birthday party.

== Career ==
At the 2005 Australian Junior Championships, Mitchell finished seventh in the all-around, balance beam, and floor exercise and eighth on the uneven bars. She missed the 2006 season due to a hamstring injury.

=== 2007: Senior and World Championships debut ===
Mitchell became age-eligible for senior international competition in 2007. She competed at the WOGA Classic in Plano, Texas and helped the Australian team win the bronze medal. Individually, Mitchell placed fourth in the all-around, won the silver medal on the balance beam and the bronze medal on the floor exercise. She then traveled to Kyiv to compete in the Stella Zakharova Cup where the Australian team finished sixth. Individually, Mitchell won the bronze medal in the all-around and the silver medal on the balance beam, and she finished fifth on the uneven bars and seventh on the floor exercise. Then in May at the Australian Championships, she won the gold medal with the Western Australian team and the silver medal in the all-around. She also won the gold medal on the balance beam and the silver medal on the floor exercise, and she placed fifth on the uneven bars and eleventh on the vault.

In July, Mitchell helped the Australian team win a gold medal against Japan in a friendly meet. Individually, she won the bronze medal in the all-around behind Daria Joura and Kōko Tsurumi. She also won the silver medals on the balance beam and on the floor exercise. She was selected to compete at the World Championships alongside Daria Joura, Shona Morgan, Hollie Dykes, and Chloe Sims, and they finished eleventh in the qualification round. Individually, she qualified for the balance beam event final and placed fifth with a score of 15.425. After her debut World Championships, she competed at the DTB Cup in Germany and won a silver medal on the balance beam and a bronze medal on the floor exercise. Her final competition of the season was the Olympic Test Event, where she won the silver medal on the balance beam and placed fourth in the all-around.

=== 2008: First Olympic Games ===
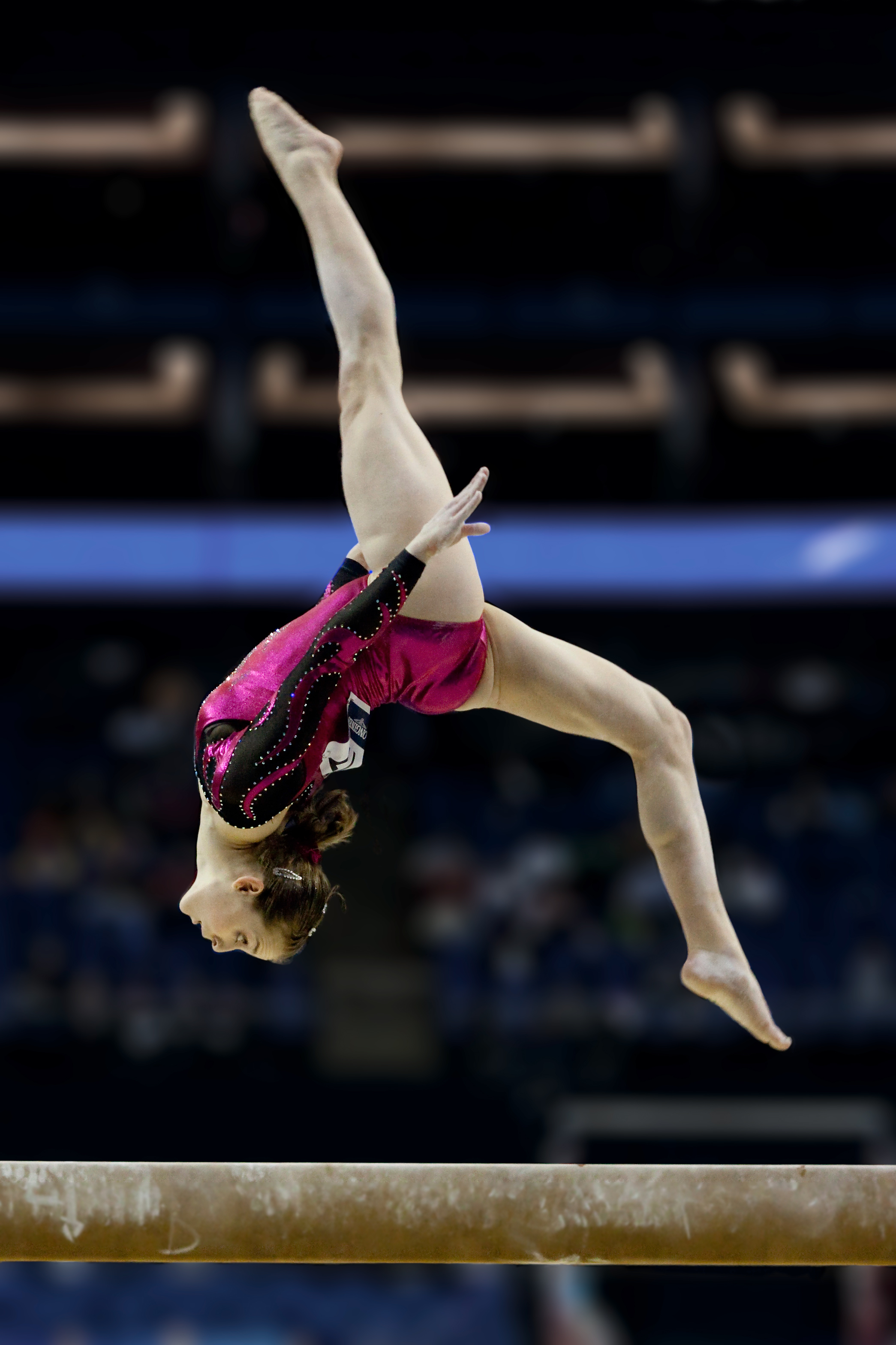
Mitchell performing a layout step-out on the balance beam during the 2009 World Championships.

Mitchell competed at the Pacific Rim Championships where the Australian team finished fourth behind the United States, Canada, and China. She qualified for the uneven bars final and placed fourth with a score of 15.100. In May, she competed at the Australian Championships where she finished fourth in the all-around, and she helped Western Australia win the silver medal in the team competition behind Victoria. She also placed seventh on the uneven bars, won the silver medal on the balance beam behind Shona Morgan, and finished fourth on the floor exercise. She then competed at the Moscow World Cup where she finished fifth on both the uneven bars and the balance beam.

Mitchell was selected to represent Australia at the 2008 Summer Olympics alongside Georgia Bonora, Ashleigh Brennan, Daria Joura, Shona Morgan, and Olivia Vivian. The team finished sixth in the team final which was the highest team finish in Australian gymnastics history. After the Olympics, she competed at the Stuttgart World Cup and won the silver medal on both the balance beam and the floor exercise. She then won the gold medal on the balance beam at the World Cup Final making her the first Australian gymnast to win a gold medal at the World Cup Final.

=== 2009: World silver medalist ===
In July, Mitchell competed at the Australian Championships in Perth and claimed her first national all-around title with a total score of 112.325. She also became the national champion on the uneven bars, balance beam, and floor exercise. Then in October, she competed at the World Championships at The O2 Arena in London. She finished fourth all-around and was 0.025 points away from the bronze medal after she took a 0.100 deduction on the floor exercise for stepping out of bounds. She went on to win two silver medals in the event finals, on the floor exercise behind Great Britain's Beth Tweddle and on the balance beam behind China's Deng Linlin. This made her the first Australian female gymnast to medal at the World Championships and the first Australian gymnast to win two medals at the same World Championships. Mitchell broke her hand in December.

=== 2010: Commonwealth and World champion ===
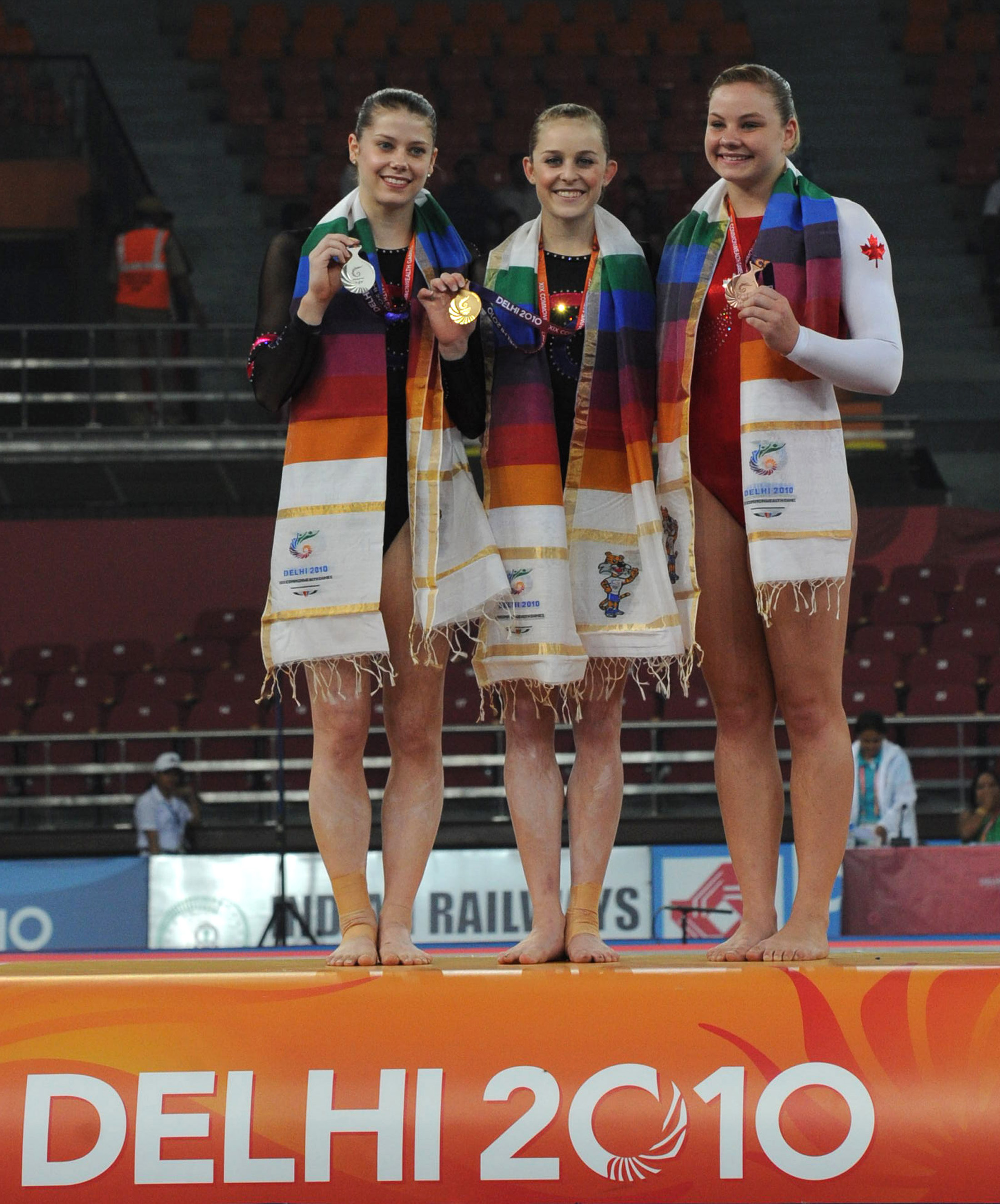
Mitchell (centre) at the 2010 Commonwealth Games medal ceremony for the uneven bars final.

After recovering from her broken hand, Mitchell sprained her ankle on a tumbling pass in March, and then strained her adductor in July, which ultimately caused her to miss the Australian Championships. She returned to competition at the Commonwealth Games and won the team gold medal alongside teammates Georgia Bonora, Ashleigh Brennan, Emily Little, and Georgia Wheeler. She then went on to win gold in the all-around, on the uneven bars, and on the balance beam, for a total of four gold medals. She also won a silver medal on the floor exercise behind English gymnast Imogen Cairns. Mitchell's four gold medals tied the Commonwealth Games record for a female gymnast with Lori Strong from the 1990 Commonwealth Games.

Mitchell was then selected to compete at the World Championships in Rotterdam alongside Georgia Bonora, Ashleigh Brennan, Emily Little, Larrissa Miller, and Georgia Wheeler, and they finished sixth in the team competition. Mitchell also finished sixth in the all-around with a total score of 58.133, 0.833 away from the bronze medal score. In the balance beam final, she finished fourth with a score of 15.200, only 0.033 away from the bronze medal. She then won gold on the floor exercise with a score of 14.833. This was the first World title for a female Australian gymnast and the second World title for any Australian gymnast (Philippe Rizzo won the horizontal bar title in 2006).

In November, Mitchell competed at the Stuttgart World Cup and won the gold medal on the floor exercise, balance beam, and uneven bars, making her the first Australian gymnast to win three gold medals at a single World Cup event. She then competed at the Glasgow World Cup where she won two more gold medals on the balance beam and floor exercise and the bronze medal on the uneven bars. Her final competition of the season was the Toyota Cup where she won the gold medal on the balance beam.

=== 2011: Fourth World Championships ===
On 5 March, Mitchell competed at the American Cup in Jacksonville, Florida where she finished sixth in the all-around with a total score of 54.932. She then went to the Paris World Cup where she finished fourth on the balance beam. Then at the Japan Cup in Tokyo, she placed fourth in the all-around with a total score of 53.750. She also finished fourth with the Australian team in the team competition.

In July, Mitchell won gold medals in the all-around, vault, balance beam, and floor exercise at the Australian Championships. She was then selected for the World Championships team alongside Ashleigh Brennan, Larrissa Miller, Emily Little, Georgia-Rose Brown, and Mary-Anne Monckton. At the World Championships, the Australian team finished eighth, and Mitchell finished eighth in the all-around and fifth on the floor exercise.

=== 2012: Second Olympic Games ===
Mitchell competing her floor routine at the Australian Championships.

In March, Mitchell competed at the Pacific Rim Championships where the Australian team finished fourth. In the event finals, she finished fifth on both the balance beam and the floor exercise. Then in April, she competed at the Zibo World Cup and won the bronze medal on the balance beam behind Chinese gymnasts Yao Jinnan and Huang Qiushuang and the gold medal on the floor exercise. At the Australian Championships in Sydney, she did not compete on the uneven bars in order to protect a sore shoulder. Although she did not compete in the all-around, she won the gold medal on both the floor exercise and the balance beam.

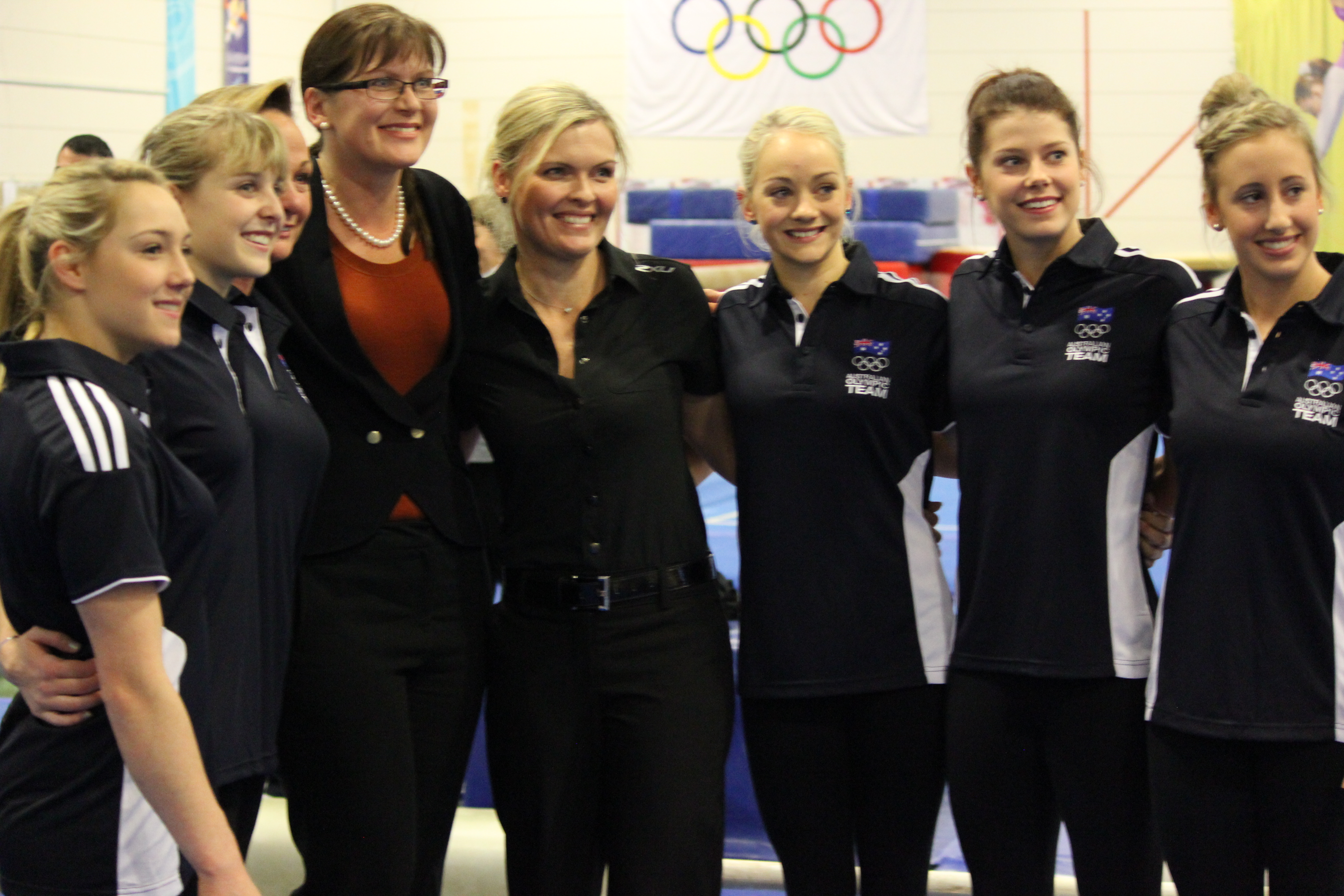
Mitchell (second-from-left) with Kate Lundy and her Olympic teammates

In June, she was one of twelve Australian gymnasts vying to earn a final spot on the Olympic squad at a training session for the national team at the Australian Institute of Sport. Their Olympic training preparations included learning how to deal with flash photography with strobe lighting used at practice and being exposed to distracting noises.

On 21 June 2012, she was formally named to represent Australia at the 2012 Summer Olympics alongside Georgia Bonora, Ashleigh Brennan, Emily Little, and Larrissa Miller. The Australian team only finished tenth in the qualification round and did not advance to the team finals. Mitchell qualified for the floor exercise event final where she finished fifth. She had shoulder reconstruction surgery after the Olympics.

=== 2014: Comeback ===
Mitchell returned to competition at the Doha World Cup and finished fourth on the floor exercise. She then went to the Korea Cup in Incheon where she once again placed fourth on the floor exercise. Then at the Australian Championships, she won the bronze medal on the balance beam and the gold medal on the floor exercise. At the Commonwealth Games, Mitchell won a silver medal with the Australian team and on the floor exercise behind Claudia Fragapane. She was initially named to Australia's team for the World Championships, but she withdrew after injuring both of her ankles during podium training.

=== 2015–2016: Injury and retirement ===
Mitchell competed at the 2015 Australian Championships and won the gold medal on the floor exercise and placed fourth on the balance beam. While preparing to represent Australia at the 2015 Summer Universiade, she tore her ACL and PCL and had surgery in June.

Mitchell returned to competition at the 2016 Australian Championships and was inducted into Gymnastics Australia's Hall of Fame after the qualification round. In the event finals, she won the gold medal on the balance beam and the bronze medal on the floor exercise. However, Australia had only qualified one spot for the 2016 Olympics, and Mitchell was not selected. Her final competition was the Anadia World Challenge Cup where she qualified in third place for the balance beam event final, but she withdrew due to an injury.

Mitchell announced her retirement from gymnastics on 27 September 2016, stating "I've given everything that I could to the sport and I have no regrets."

== Personal life ==
Mitchell graduated from Curtin University and now works as a radiographer at Royal Perth Hospital. She is also a motivational speaker. She has been a member of both the Gymnastics Western Australia High Performance Advisory Committee and the Commonwealth Games Athlete Advisory Commission since 2019.

In 2021, she was awarded the Medal of the Order of Australia in recognition of her service to gymnastics.

== Eponymous skills ==
Mitchell has the triple wolf turn named after her in the Code of Points on both the balance beam and the floor exercise.

| Apparatus | Name | Description | Difficulty (Note: Valid for the 2025–2028 Code of Points) | Added to Code of Points |
|---|---|---|---|---|
| Balance beam Floor exercise | Mitchell (Note: Also referred to as a triple wolf turn) | triple turn (1080°) in tuck stand on one leg – free leg optional | E (0.5) | 2010 World Championships |

== Competitive history ==
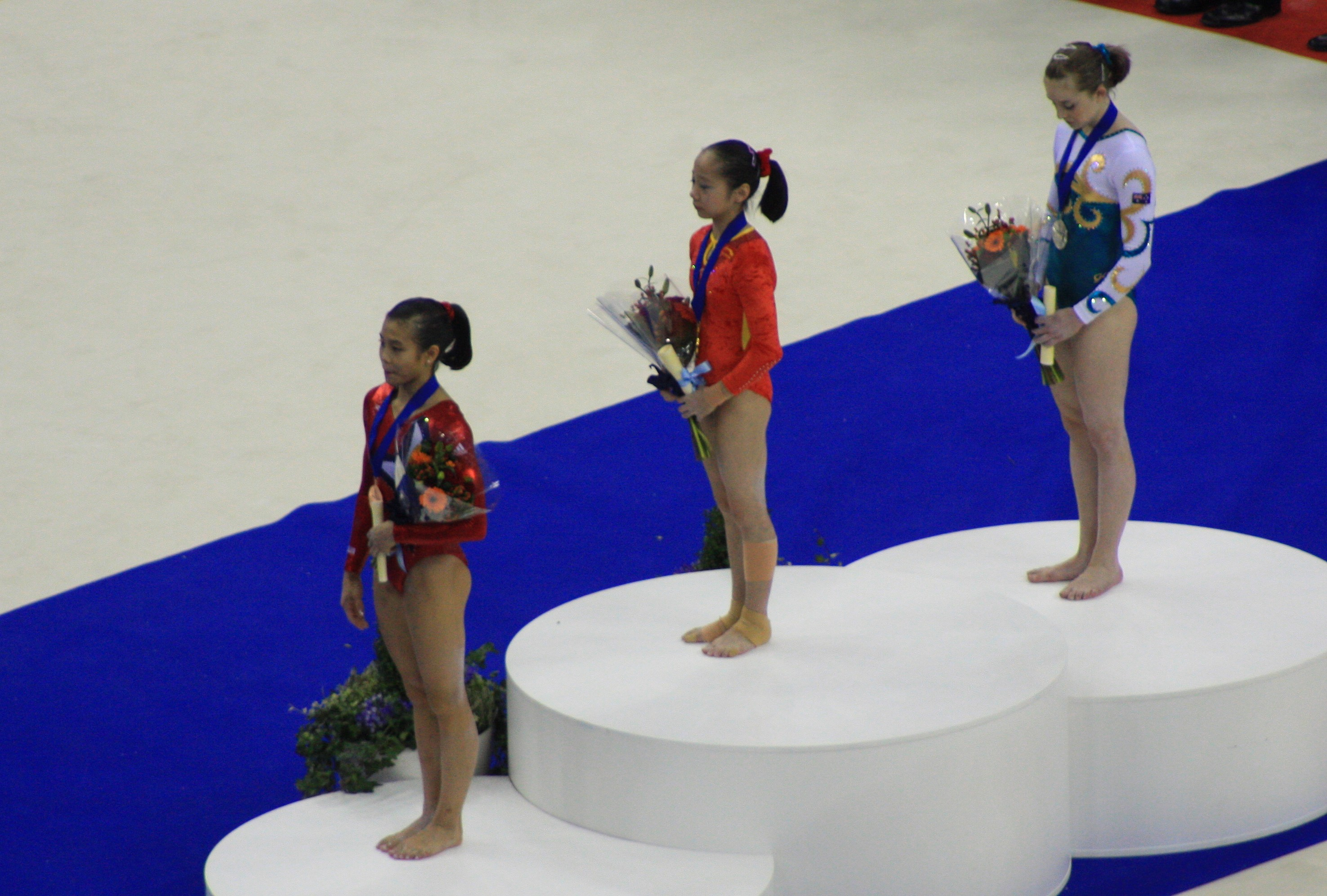
Mitchell (right) on the balance beam podium at the 2009 World Championships.

Competitive history of Lauren Mitchell
| Year | Event | Team | AA | VT | UB | BB | FX |
|---|---|---|---|---|---|---|---|
| 2005 | Junior Australian Championships | | 7 | | 8 | 7 | 7 |
| 2007 | WOGA Classic | 3rd place, bronze medalist(s) | 4 | | | 2nd place, silver medalist(s) | 3rd place, bronze medalist(s) |
| 2007 | Stella Zakharova Cup | 6 | 3rd place, bronze medalist(s) | | 5 | 2nd place, silver medalist(s) | 7 |
| 2007 | Australian Championships | 1st place, gold medalist(s) | 2nd place, silver medalist(s) | 11 | 5 | 1st place, gold medalist(s) | 2nd place, silver medalist(s) |
| 2007 | Australia-Japan Friendly | 1st place, gold medalist(s) | 3rd place, bronze medalist(s) | | | 2nd place, silver medalist(s) | 2nd place, silver medalist(s) |
| 2007 | World Championships | 11 | | | | 5 | |
| 2007 | Stuttgart World Cup | | | | 4 | 2nd place, silver medalist(s) | 3rd place, bronze medalist(s) |
| 2007 | Olympic Test Event | | 4 | | | 2nd place, silver medalist(s) | |
| 2008 | Pacific Rim Championships | 4 | | | 4 | | |
| 2008 | Australian Championships | 2nd place, silver medalist(s) | 4 | | 7 | 2nd place, silver medalist(s) | 4 |
| 2008 | Moscow World Cup | | | | 5 | 5 | |
| 2008 | Olympic Games | 6 | | | | | |
| 2008 | Stuttgart World Cup | | | | | 2nd place, silver medalist(s) | 2nd place, silver medalist(s) |
| 2008 | World Cup Final | | | | | 1st place, gold medalist(s) | |
| 2009 | Australian Championships | | 1st place, gold medalist(s) | | 1st place, gold medalist(s) | 1st place, gold medalist(s) | 1st place, gold medalist(s) |
| 2009 | World Championships | | 4 | | | 2nd place, silver medalist(s) | 2nd place, silver medalist(s) |
2010
| 2010 | Commonwealth Games | 1st place, gold medalist(s) | 1st place, gold medalist(s) | | 1st place, gold medalist(s) | 1st place, gold medalist(s) | 2nd place, silver medalist(s) |
| 2010 | World Championships | 6 | 6 | | | 4 | 1st place, gold medalist(s) |
| 2010 | Stuttgart World Cup | | | | 1st place, gold medalist(s) | 1st place, gold medalist(s) | 1st place, gold medalist(s) |
| 2010 | Glasgow World Cup | | | | 3rd place, bronze medalist(s) | 1st place, gold medalist(s) | 1st place, gold medalist(s) |
| 2010 | Toyota Cup | | | | | 1st place, gold medalist(s) | |
| 2011 | American Cup | | 6 | | | | |
| 2011 | Paris World Cup | | | | | 4 | |
| 2011 | Japan Cup | 4 | 4 | | | | |
| 2011 | Australian Championships | | 1st place, gold medalist(s) | 1st place, gold medalist(s) | | 1st place, gold medalist(s) | 1st place, gold medalist(s) |
| 2011 | World Championships | 8 | 8 | | | | 5 |
| 2012 | Pacific Rim Championships | 4 | | | | 5 | 5 |
| 2012 | Zibo World Challenge Cup | | | | | 3rd place, bronze medalist(s) | 1st place, gold medalist(s) |
| 2012 | Australian Championships | | | | | 1st place, gold medalist(s) | 1st place, gold medalist(s) |
| 2012 | Olympic Games | | | | | | 5 |
| 2014 | Doha World Challenge Cup | | | | | | 4 |
| 2014 | Korea Cup | | | | | | 4 |
| 2014 | Australian Championships | | | | | 3rd place, bronze medalist(s) | 1st place, gold medalist(s) |
| 2014 | Commonwealth Games | 2nd place, silver medalist(s) | | | | 6 | 2nd place, silver medalist(s) |
| 2015 | Australian Championships | | | | | 4 | 1st place, gold medalist(s) |
| 2016 | Australian Championships | | | | | 1st place, gold medalist(s) | 3rd place, bronze medalist(s) |
