= Gymnastics at the 2010 Commonwealth Games – Women's artistic individual all-around =

Gymnastic event at the 2010 Commonwealth Games

The Women's artistic individual all-around event took place on 6 October 2010 at the Indira Gandhi Arena.

== Final ==
Position	Gymnast	Vault (gymnastics)	Uneven bars	Balance beam	Floor (gymnastics)	Total
1st place, gold medalist(s)	Lauren Mitchell (AUS)	14.650	13.900	15.200	14.450	58.200
2nd place, silver medalist(s)	Emily Little (AUS)	14.850	13.750	13.750	13.500	55.850
3rd place, bronze medalist(s)	Georgia Bonora (AUS)	13.800	13.350	14.300	13.500	54.950
4	Imogen Cairns (ENG)	14.250	12.800	13.350	14.250	54.650
5	Jocelyn Hunt (ENG)	13.950	12.550	13.650	13.450	53.600
6	Laura Edwards (ENG)	13.750	12.750	13.400	13.000	52.900
7	Kristin Klarenbach (CAN)	13.950	12.100	11.200	12.900	50.150
8	Cynthia Lemieux-Guillemette (CAN)	13.100	12.400	12.700	11.800	50.000
9	Tracie Ang (MAS)	13.400	12.600	11.250	12.050	49.300
10	Ashleigh Heldsinger (RSA)	13.450	11.650	12.300	11.600	49.000
11	Victoria Simpson (SCO)	12.850	11.300	12.350	12.350	48.850
12	Jordan Rae (NZL)	13.250	10.500	12.550	12.400	48.700
13	Jordan Lipton (SCO)	13.350	10.550	12.800	11.950	48.650
14	Seriena Johnrose (NIR)	13.050	11.200	12.300	11.550	48.100
15	Heem Wei Lim (SIN)	13.450	11.250	12.450	10.700	47.850
16	Sau Chan (MAS)	12.500	11.100	13.250	10.750	47.600
17	Noor Hasnan (MAS)	13.500	11.700	11.850	10.450	47.500
18	Nicole Tay (SIN)	12.050	11.600	12.700	11.150	47.500
19	Holly Moon (NZL)	12.550	10.800	11.700	12.250	47.300
20	Tabitha Tay (SIN)	12.250	10.800	11.800	12.150	47.000
21	Amy Regan (SCO)	13.000	11.200	11.300	11.500	47.000
22	Jennifer Khwela (RSA)	13.750	9.800	10.950	12.400	46.900
23	Briana Mitchell (NZL)	12.500	10.250	11.450	11.850	46.050
24	Charlotte McKenna (NIR)	12.850	10.600	11.650	10.650	45.750
