= Gymnastics at the 2010 Commonwealth Games – Women's artistic team all-around =

The Women's artistic team all-around event took place on 5 October 2010, at the Indira Gandhi Arena.

== Results ==
Rank	Team	Vault (gymnastics)	Uneven bars	Balance beam	Floor (gymnastics)	Total
1st place, gold medalist(s)	Australia	42.550 (1)	42.200 (1)	38.000 (3)	40.950 (1)	163.700
1st place, gold medalist(s)	Georgia Bonora	12.500	14.250	11.950	13.200	163.700
1st place, gold medalist(s)	Ashleigh Brennan	13.300		10.500	13.500	163.700
1st place, gold medalist(s)	Emily Little	14.550	13.700	12.300	13.050	163.700
1st place, gold medalist(s)	Lauren Mitchell	14.700	14.250	13.750	14.250	163.700
1st place, gold medalist(s)	Georgia Wheeler		13.600			163.700
2nd place, silver medalist(s)	England	41.500 (2)	37.250 (3)	39.550 (1)	39.900 (2)	158.200
2nd place, silver medalist(s)	Imogen Cairns	14.000	12.300	13.200	14.000	158.200
2nd place, silver medalist(s)	Laura Edwards	13.550	11.350	13.200	13.050	158.200
2nd place, silver medalist(s)	Jocelyn Hunt	13.800	12.500	13.150	12.850	158.200
2nd place, silver medalist(s)	Charlotte Lindsley	13.700	12.450	10.500	12.150	158.200
2nd place, silver medalist(s)	Becky Wing					158.200
3rd place, bronze medalist(s)	Canada	40.950 (3)	38.150 (2)	38.200 (2)	37.450 (3)	154.750
3rd place, bronze medalist(s)	Catherine Dion			12.800		154.750
3rd place, bronze medalist(s)	Kristin Klarenbach	13.650	12.450	12.200	12.000	154.750
3rd place, bronze medalist(s)	Cynthia Lemieux-Guillemette	12.950	13.250	13.200	12.300	154.750
3rd place, bronze medalist(s)	Gabby May	13.750	12.400		12.150	154.750
3rd place, bronze medalist(s)	Emma Leigh Willis	13.550	12.450	11.600	13.000	154.750
4	Malaysia	39.750 (4)	36.050 (4)	31.950 (7)	36.300 (4)	144.050
4	Farah Ann Abdul Hadi	12.850	10.250	10.500	12.050	144.050
4	Tracie Ang	13.500	12.050	10.000	12.950	144.050
4	Sau Wah Chan	12.700	12.100	11.350	11.300	144.050
4	Noor Hasnan	13.400	11.900	10.100	11.000	144.050
5	Scotland	37.900 (7)	33.850 (6)	34.650 (4)	35.600 (5)	142.000
5	Jordan Lipton	13.200	12.400	11.550	11.000	142.000
5	Amy Regan	11.850	10.800	10.450	12.650	142.000
5	Victoria Simpson	12.850	10.650	12.650	11.950	142.000
6	Singapore	37.700 (8)	34.450 (5)	33.900 (6)	34.600 (7)	140.650
6	Khoo Krystal Oon Hui	0.000	5.950	10.400		140.650
6	Lim Heem Wei	12.050	12.450	12.700	10.950	140.650
6	Tay Nicole Xi Hui	13.100	11.850	10.800	11.650	140.650
6	Tay Tabitha Jia Hui	12.550	10.150	10.100	12.000	140.650
7	New Zealand	38.850 (6)	32.700 (7)	33.950 (5)	35.050 (6)	140.550
7	Briana Mitchell	12.550	10.750	11.200	11.350	140.550
7	Holly Moon	13.000	10.850	11.250	11.450	140.550
7	Jordan Rae	13.300	11.100	11.500	12.250	140.550
8	India	39.150 (5)	24.650 (8)	29.150 (8)	31.350 (8)	124.300
8	Meenakshi	12.550	7.300	7.800	10.850	124.300
8	Priti Das	12.850	5.850	10.050	10.500	124.300
8	Roma Dilip Joglekar	12.850	7.550			124.300
8	Dipa Karmakar	13.450	9.800	11.300	9.100	124.300
8	Debjani Samanta			6.700	10.000	124.300
