= Gymnastics at the 2010 Commonwealth Games – Women's uneven bars =

The Women's uneven bars event took place on 7 October 2010 at the Indira Gandhi Arena.

== Final ==
Kristin Klarenbach withdrew from the final at the last minute, so there were only seven competitors here.

Position	Gymnast	D Score	E Score	Penalty	Total
1st place, gold medalist(s)	Lauren Mitchell (AUS)	5.500	8.650		14.150
2nd place, silver medalist(s)	Georgia Bonora (AUS)	5.300	8.625		13.925
3rd place, bronze medalist(s)	Cynthia Lemieux-Guillemette (CAN)	5.500	7.850		13.350
4	Charlotte Lindsey (ENG)	4.200	7.700		11.900
5	Jordan Lipton (SCO)	5.100	6.550		11.650
6	Heem Wei Lim (SIN)	4.100	7.275		11.375
7	Jocelyn Hunt (ENG)	4.400	6.825		11.225
