= Shona Morgan =

Australian artistic gymnast

- Full name: Shona Morgan
- Born: 1 September 1990 (age 36) Mount Waverley, Melbourne
- Height: 160 cm (5 ft 3 in)

Gymnastics career
- Discipline: Women's artistic gymnastics
- Country represented: Australia
- Club: Waverley Gymnastics Centre
- Head coaches: John Hart, Shao-yi Jiang, Sasha Vildanov
- Former coach: Michelle Lucas
- Choreographer: Adriana Pop; Stacey Umeh-Lees

Shona Morgan (born 1 September 1990) is an Australian former gymnast, who trained at the Waverley Gymnastics Centre in Victoria under John Hart and Shaoyi Jiang. Shona was the all-around silver medalist at the 2008 Australian National Championships and was a member of the Australian team at the 2008 Olympics in Beijing. Shona had previously represented Australia successfully at the 2007 World Gymnastics Championships in Stuttgart, Germany; the 2007 Australia vs China dual meet in Melbourne, Australia; and the 2008 Golden State Classic in Sacramento, California (where she won the elite senior individual all-around).

At the Olympics, Morgan qualified to the individual all-around final, where she placed 15th, while clubmate Georgia Bonora placed 13th. Their top-20 finish was a first for an Australian club program. Shona was also a reserve for the balance beam final.

At the 2009 Victorian State Championships, Shona won the individual all-around with an impressive performance, including some newly added skills, on all apparatus over two days of competition. In July she went on to represent her state at the Australian National Championships in Perth, where she finished 2nd all-around behind her Olympic teammate Lauren Mitchell. She was selected to compete at the Japan Team Cup just after Nationals but declined the assignment in order to focus on schoolwork.

Shona attended Stanford University from 2011 to 2014, where she competed for the Stanford Women's Gymnastics team. In 2015 Shona joined the Cirque Du Soleil touring show Amaluna.

== See also ==
- List of Caulfield Grammar School people
