= George Tansing =

Australian rules footballer

Personal information
- Full name: George Michael Tansing
- Born: 25 March 1884; Geelong, Victoria
- Died: 4 April 1962 (aged 78); Geelong, Victoria
- Original team: East Geelong (GDFA)

Playing career^{1}
Years	Club	Games (Goals)
1908	Geelong	5 (2)
- ^{1} Playing statistics correct to the end of 1908.

George Michael Tansing (25 March 1884 – 4 April 1962) was a former Australian rules footballer, and the second Chinese Australian to play in the Victorian Football League (VFL), playing five games for Geelong in 1908.

The son of Chinese immigrant Sang Sing and Ada Mary Stephens, Tansing was born with the name Kimjue Sing in Geelong in 1884. He adopted the anglicized name George Michael Tan Sing (or Tansing) later in life.

Recruited from Geelong District Football Association (GDFA) club East Geelong Tansing made his VFL debut against Carlton in Round 7, 1908, two rounds after Wally Koochew, the first Chinese Australian to play in the VFL.

Tansing made five appearances for Geelong in 1908, scoring a goal in his first and last games for the team.

== Sources ==
- Holmesby, R. & Main, J. (2014) The Encyclopedia of AFL Footballers: every AFL/VFL player since 1897 (10th ed.). BAS Publishing: Seaford, Victoria. ISBN 978-1-921496-32-5.
- Skene, P. (2023) Celestial Footy: The story of Chinese Heritage Aussie Rules, Hardie Grant Media: Melbourne. ISBN 9780646879017.
