= Western Australian Institute of Sport =

Elite sports institute in Perth, Western Australia

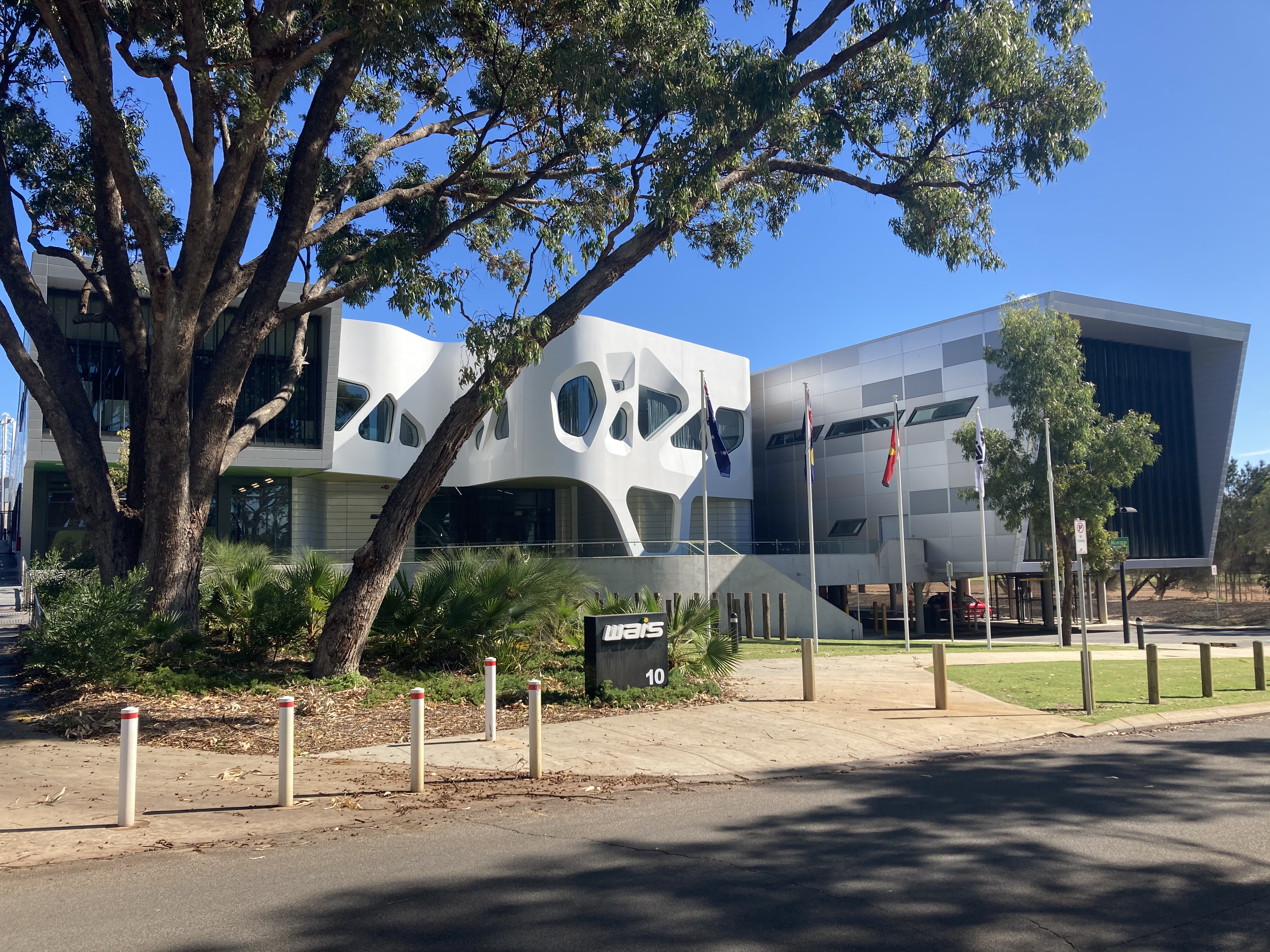
- WAIS building, May 2021
- Abbreviation: WAIS
- Formation: 1983; 43 years ago
- Type: Government agency
- Legal status: Active
- Purpose: High performance sport training institution
- Location: Perth, Western Australia
- Region served: Western Australia
- Chair: Neale Fong
- CEO: Matt Fulton
- Website: wais.org.au

The Western Australian Institute of Sport (WAIS) is an elite sports institute set up in 1983 by the Government of Western Australia to support athletes in Western Australia. The founding director was Wally Foreman who held the position for 17 years until 2001.

The institute is based at the WAIS High Performance Service Centre and has sport programs including athletics, baseball, canoeing, cycling, gymnastics, hockey, lacrosse, netball, rowing, sailing, softball, swimming, and water polo.

== Home base ==
In 1996, WAIS established itself as the first state institute to have its own facility, which was based in the annex on the southern side of the Superdrome (later known as Challenge Stadium). In the 12 years before the 1996 facility, WA produced 11 Olympic medallists (two gold). Between 1996 and 2012, the state produced 26 Olympic medallists (11 gold).

In May 2012, the Government of Western Australia announced funding of $33.7 million for the construction of a new high performance centre for the institute. The WAIS High Performance Service Centre was scheduled to be completed in two years and was built on the eastern side of Challenge Stadium, next to the existing clay tennis courts at the UWA Sports Park.

== Controversies ==
In April 2021, a number of notable female alumni of WAIS have alleged historical allegations that they had been subjected to physical and emotional abuses by the coaches, in systematic way during their involvements in WAIS. The allegations came into light as ABC covered the same in an exclusive report. The gymnasts who made the allegations included Jenny Smith, Joni Whale etc. Consequently, in May 2021, The Australian Sports Commission has officially apologised to athletes who had been "treated inappropriately at the Australian Institute of Sport following an independent review into gymnastics heard evidence of a toxic culture that contributed to physical, emotional and sexual abuse of young athletes." as APnews reported.

== Men's basketball team ==
Between 1989 and 1991, the WAIS men's basketball team, known as the Warriors, competed in the State Basketball League.

== Notable alumni ==
- Ryan Bayley, cyclist and Olympic gold medalist
- Barry Cable, Australian rules football player and coach
- Herb Elliott, middle-distance runner and Olympic and Commonwealth Games gold medalist
- Graham 'Polly' Farmer, Australian rules football player
- Adam Gilchrist, cricketer
- Steve Hooker, pole vaulter and Olympic gold medalist
- Shirley de la Hunty, athlete and Olympic and Commonwealth Games gold medalist
- Dennis Lillee, cricketer
- Luc Longley, basketball player and coach
- Rod Marsh, cricketer
- Lauren Mitchell, gymnast, World and Commonwealth gold medalist
- Louise Sauvage, wheelchair racer and Paralympic gold medalist
- Eamon Sullivan, swimmer
- Allana Slater, gymnast and Commonwealth Games gold medalist
- Andrew Vlahov, basketball player

== See also ==
- Western Australian Hall of Champions
