= Gymnastics at the 2014 Commonwealth Games – Women's floor =

Women's floor at the 2014 Commonwealth Games
- Venue: SSE Hydro
- Dates: 1 August 2014
- Competitors: 8 from 6 nations
- Winning score: 14.541

Medalists
| gold medal | Claudia Fragapane | England |
| silver medal | Lauren Mitchell | Australia |
| bronze medal | Ellie Black | Canada |

The women's individual floor competition of the 2014 Commonwealth Games took place on August 1 at the SSE Hydro arena in Glasgow, Scotland.

== Results ==
=== Qualification ===
Qualification took place on July 29 as part of the team and individual qualification event.

=== Final ===
| Position | Gymnast | D Score | E Score | Penalty | Total |
|---|---|---|---|---|---|
| 1st place, gold medalist(s) | Claudia Fragapane (ENG) | 6.000 | 8.541 | | 14.541 |
| 2nd place, silver medalist(s) | Lauren Mitchell (AUS) | 6.000 | 7.933 | 0.1 | 13.833 |
| 3rd place, bronze medalist(s) | Ellie Black (CAN) | 5.700 | 8.166 | 0.2 | 13.666 |
| 4 | Stefanie Merkle (CAN) | 5.500 | 7.933 | | 13.433 |
| 5 | Jessica Hogg (WAL) | 4.900 | 8.266 | | 13.166 |
| 6 | Hannah Whelan (ENG) | 5.400 | 7.833 | 0.1 | 13.133 |
| 7 | Charlotte Sullivan (NZL) | 5.500 | 7.533 | | 13.033 |
| 8 | Kirsten Beckett (RSA) | 5.400 | 7.900 | 0.3 | 13.000 |
