= Wolf turn =

Artistic gymnastics move

A wolf turn is a move on the balance beam in artistic gymnastics. In a squat position, the gymnast extends one foot on the beam, winds her arms and spins, returning to her original position. For balance, the gymnast's outstretched hands reduce her moment of inertia during the spin. The move is a common, strategic choice for gymnasts, as judges rate the wolf turn higher than a regular turn for difficulty, while a wolf turn is easier than a pirouette to execute, based on its lower center of gravity. For these reasons and the move's frequently wobbly or ungraceful execution, the move is subject to contempt from gymnasts and spectators.

Gymnastics moves are scored on a scale from A to J by increasing difficulty based on the Code of Points. Double and triple wolf turns are rated D and E, respectively.

Execution of the wolf turn

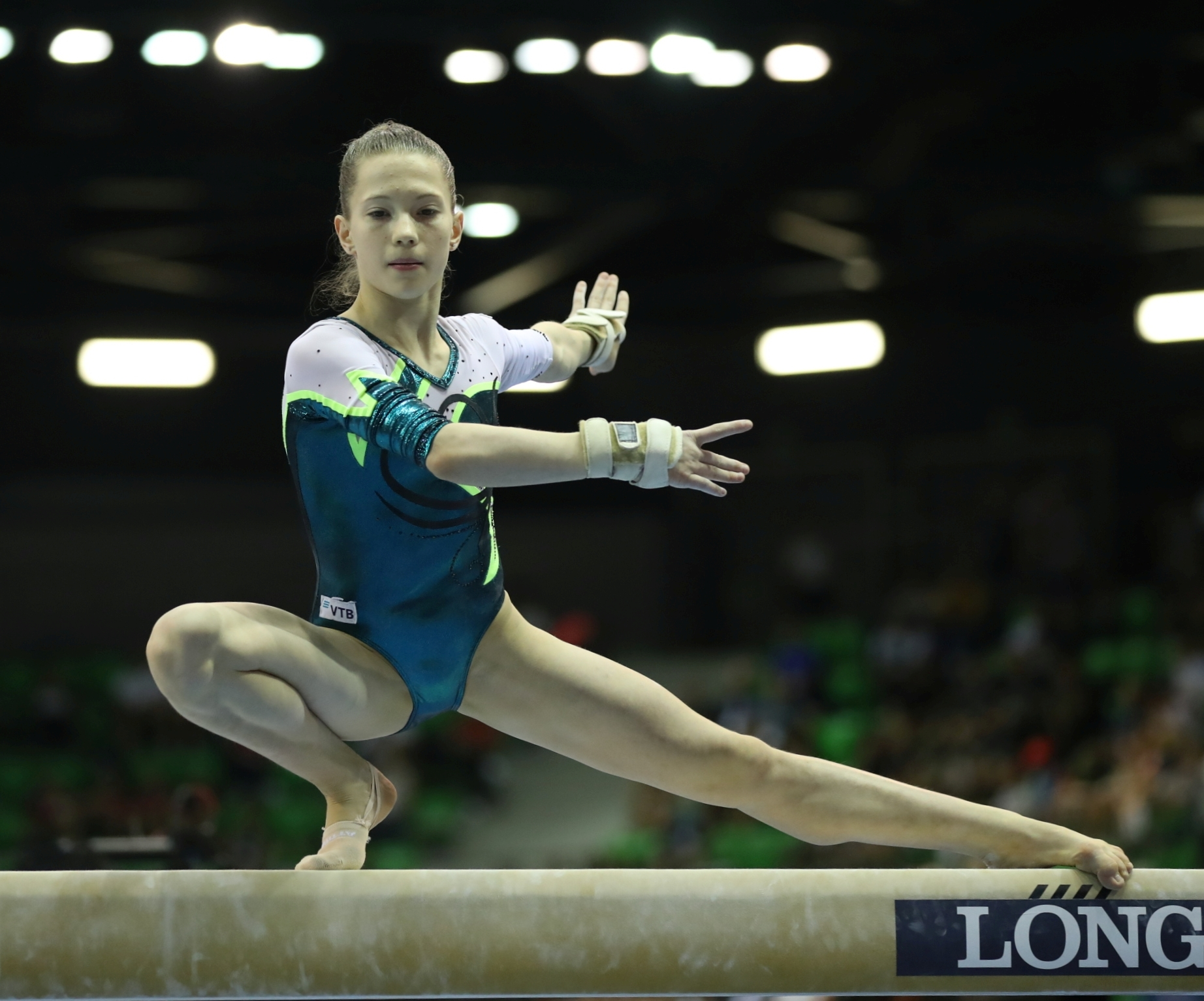
Performed by Vladislava Urazova at the 2019 Junior World Championships

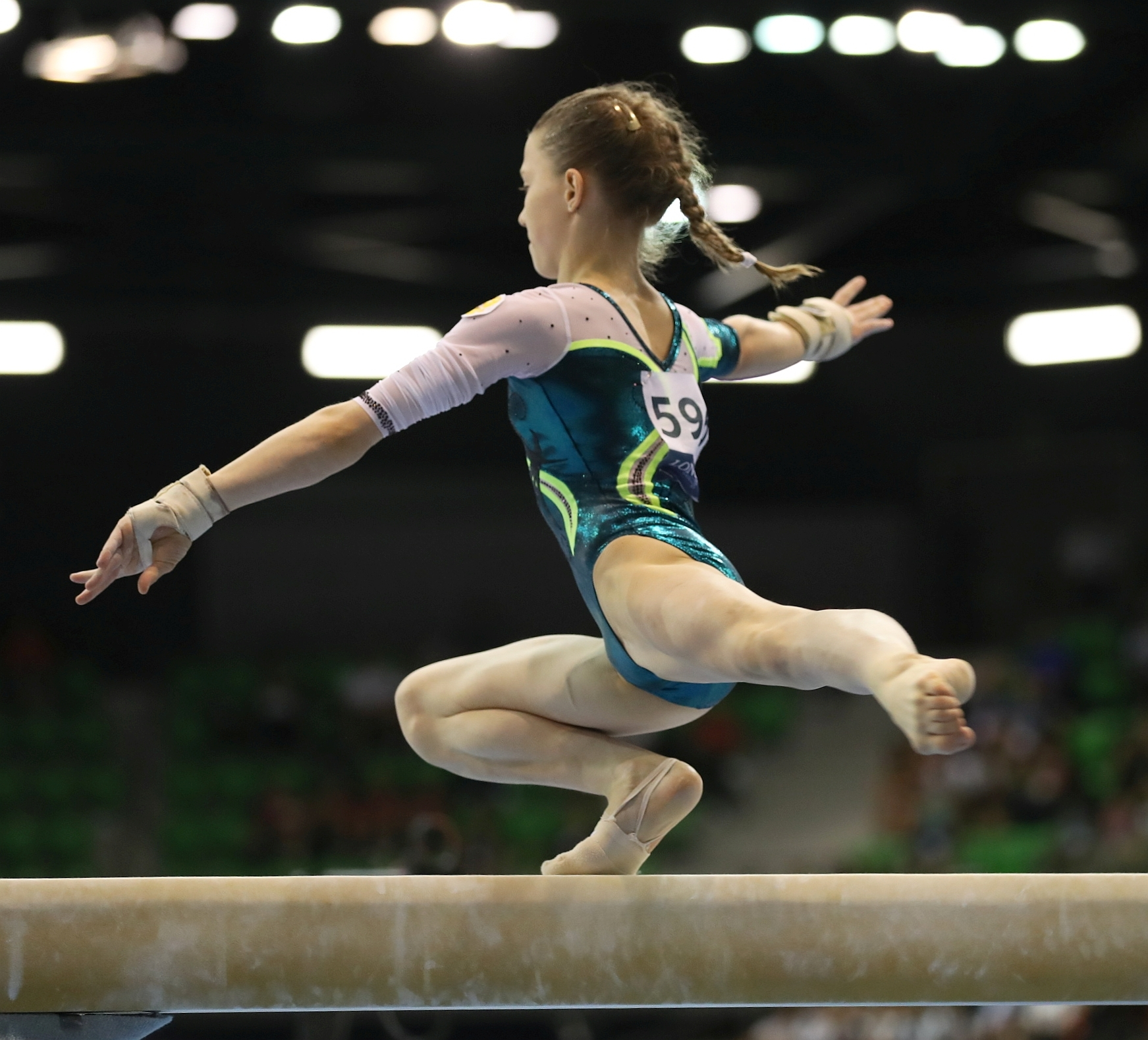
Performed by Vladislava Urazova at the 2019 Junior World Championships

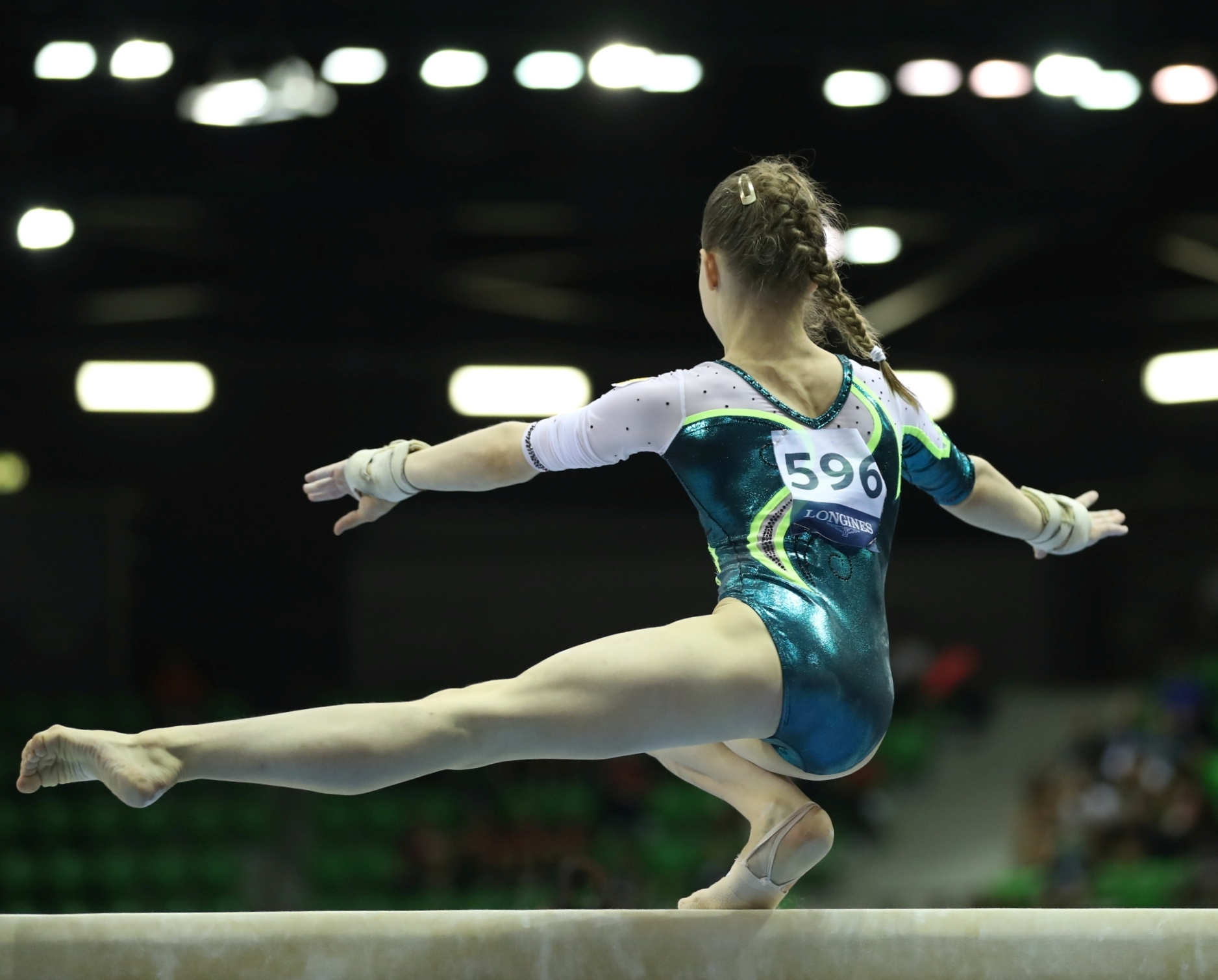
Performed by Vladislava Urazova at the 2019 Junior World Championships

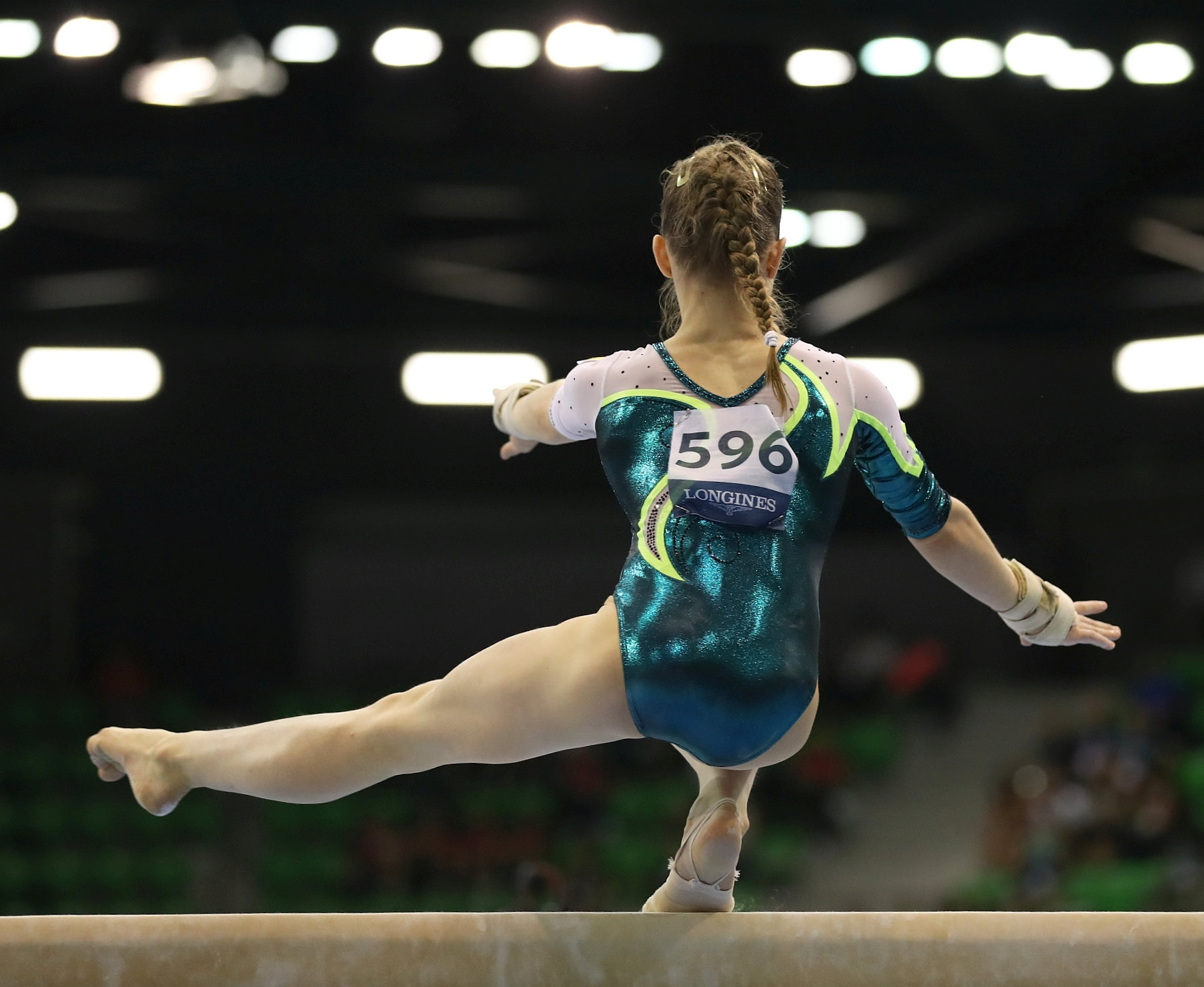
Performed by Vladislava Urazova at the 2019 Junior World Championships

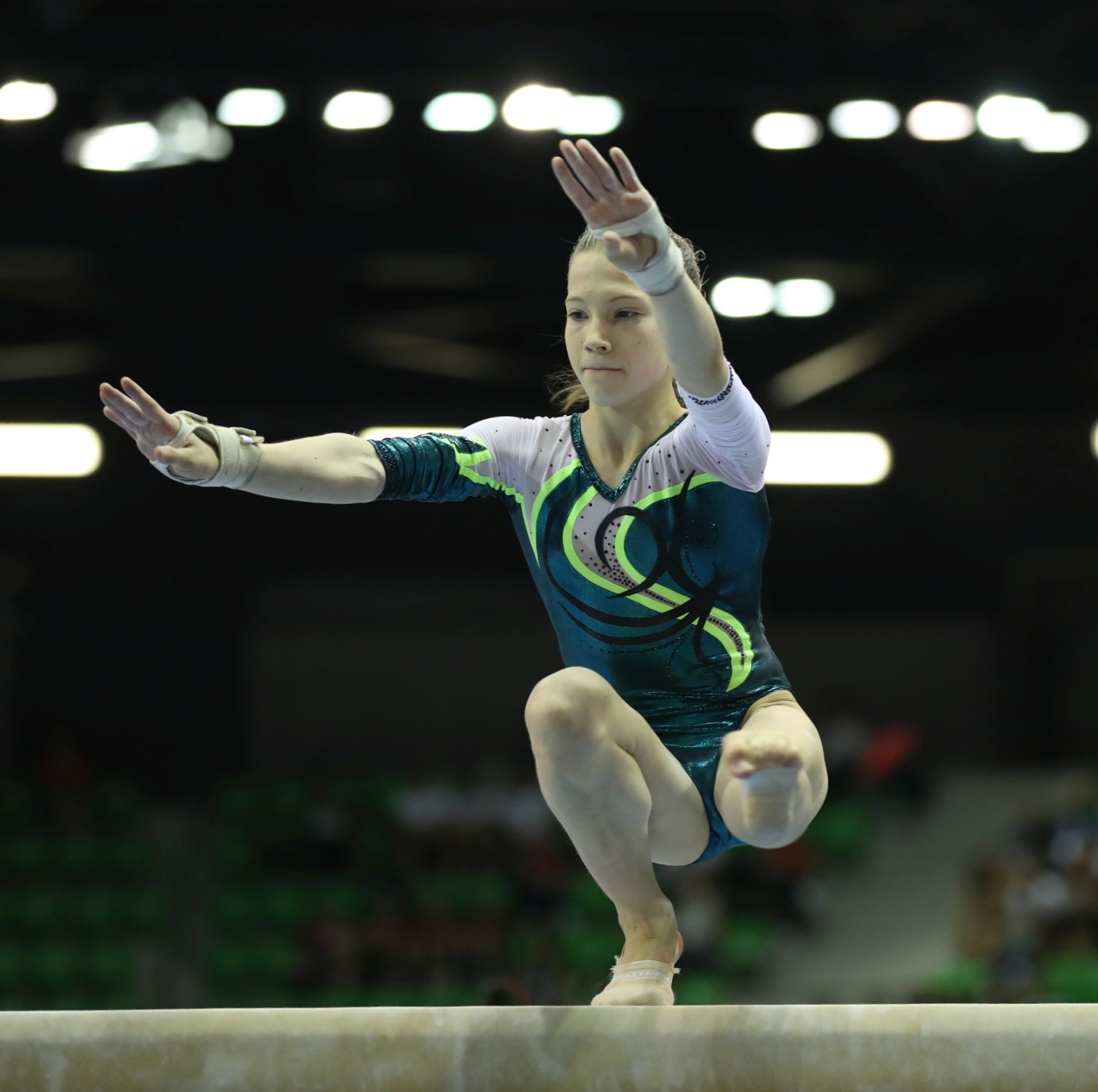
Performed by Vladislava Urazova at the 2019 Junior World Championships

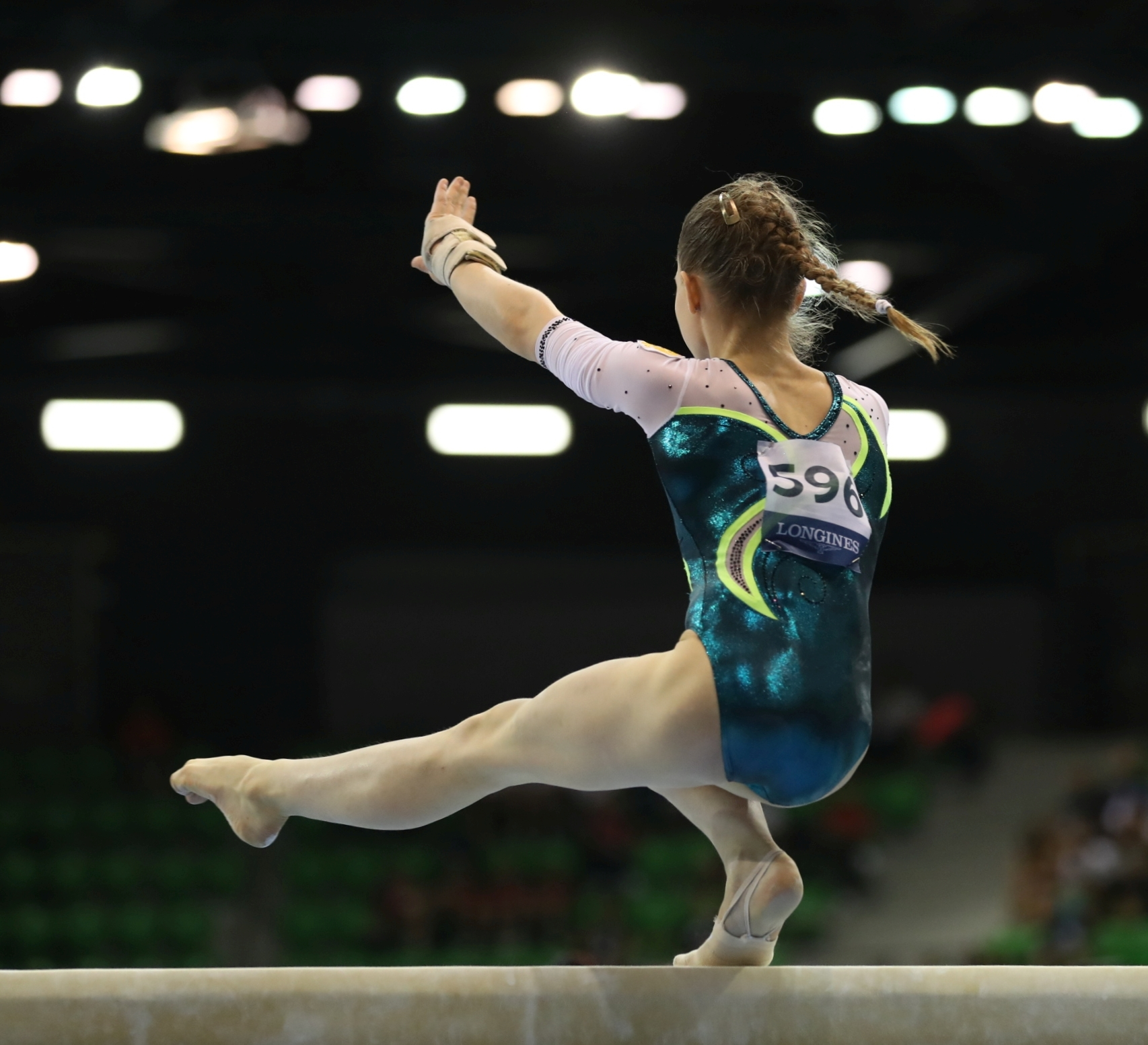
Performed by Vladislava Urazova at the 2019 Junior World Championships

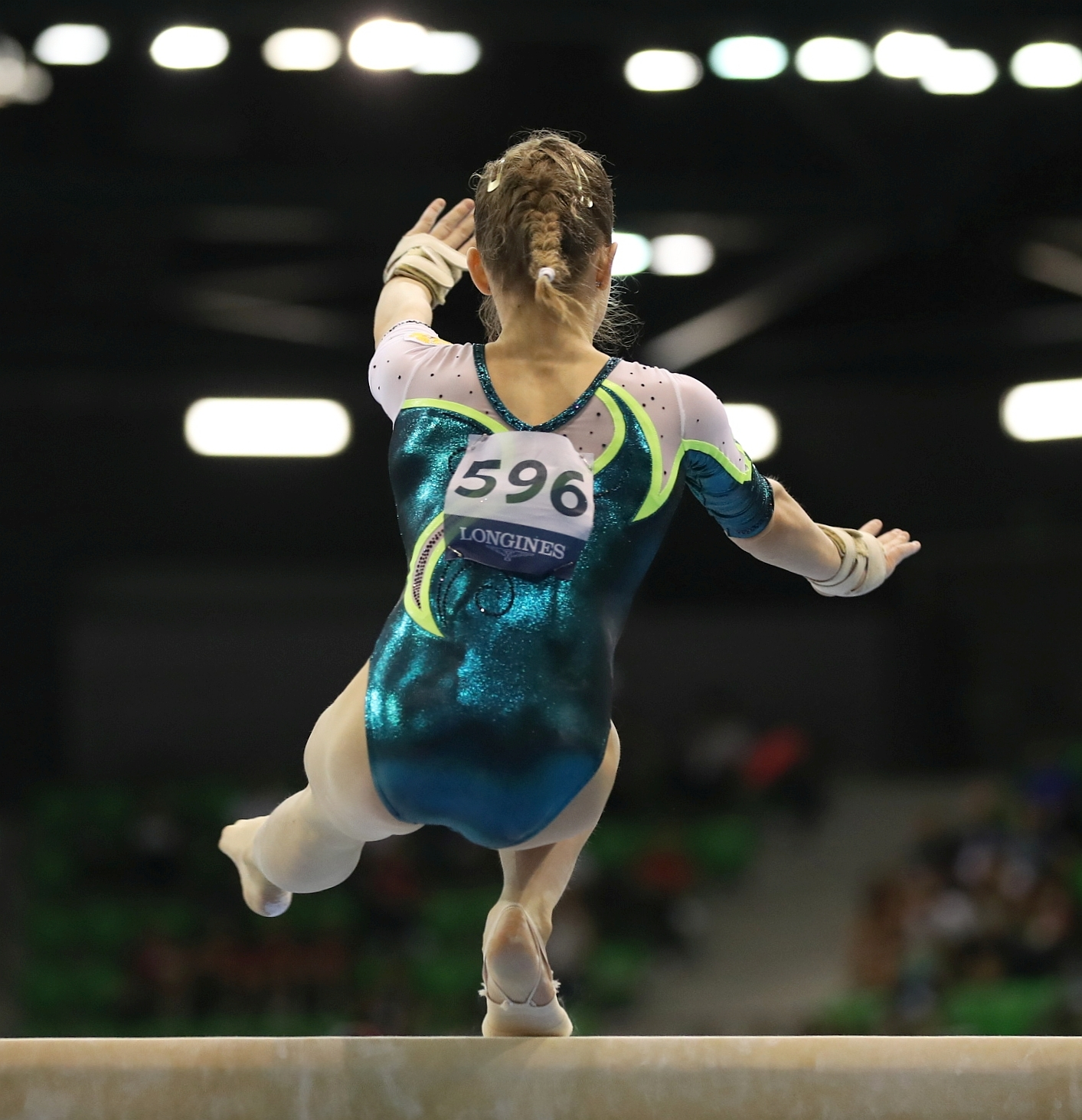
Performed by Vladislava Urazova at the 2019 Junior World Championships

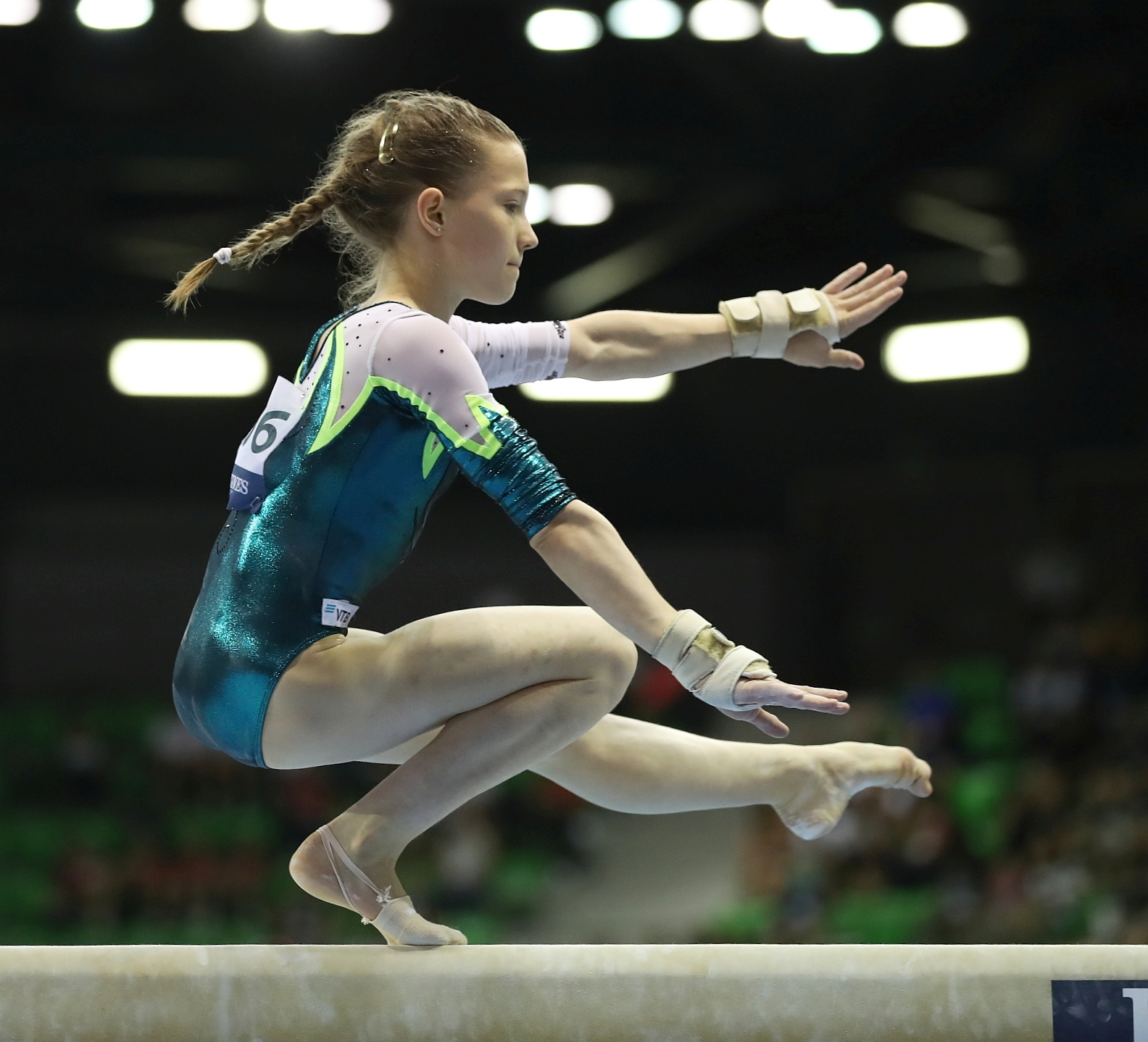
Performed by Vladislava Urazova at the 2019 Junior World Championships

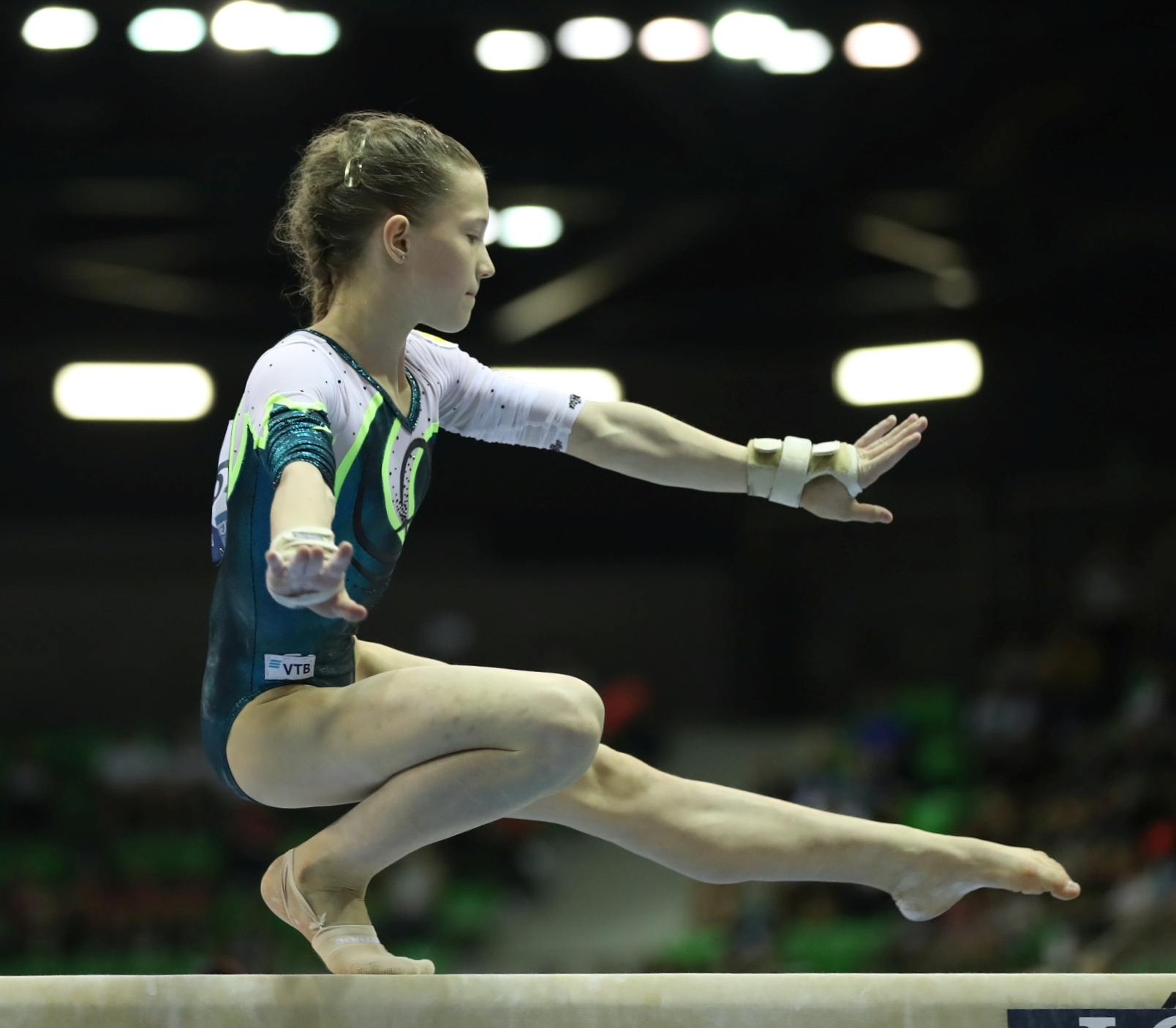
Performed by Vladislava Urazova at the 2019 Junior World Championships

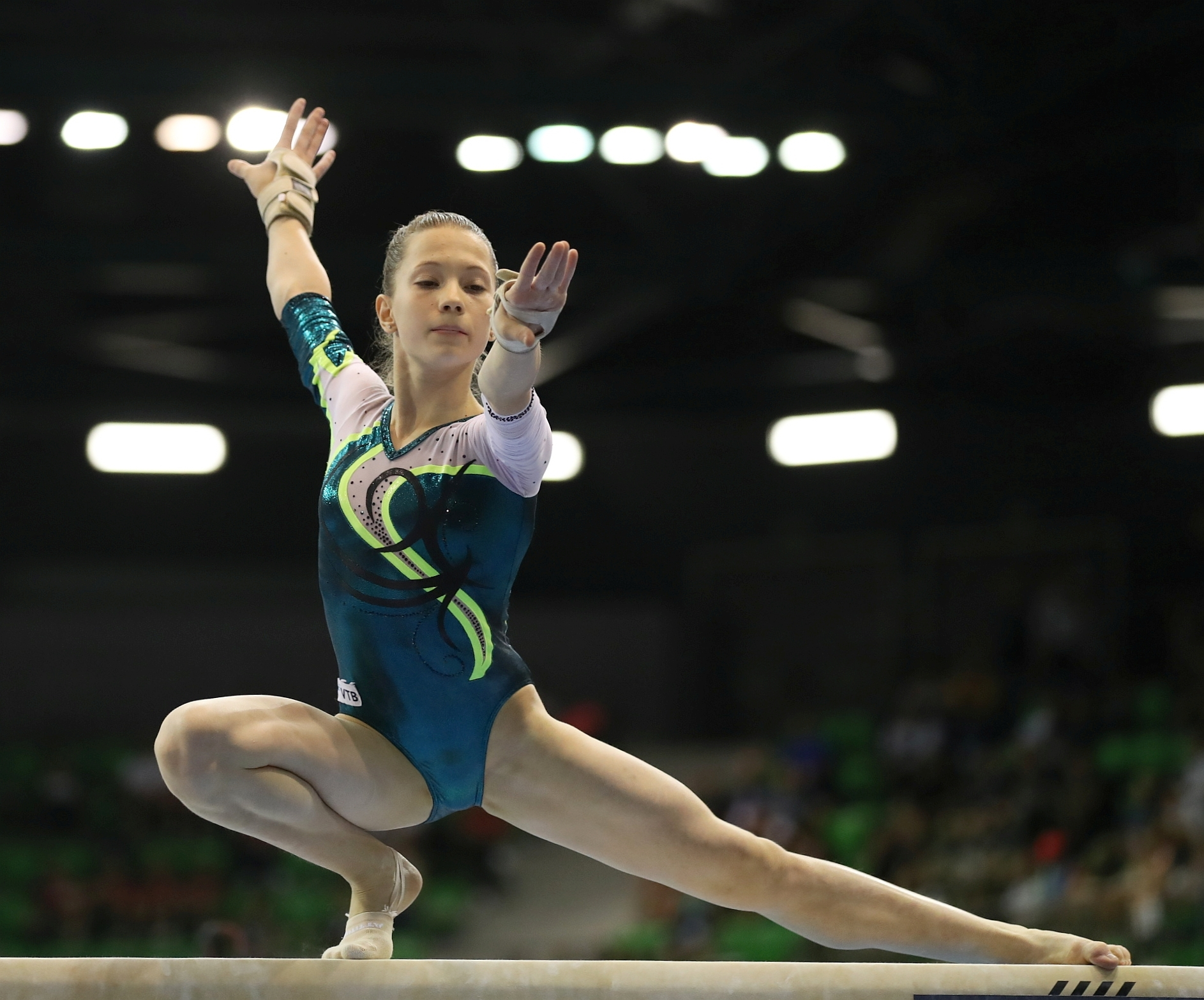
Performed by Vladislava Urazova at the 2019 Junior World Championships
