= Neale Fong =

Australian businessman

Dr. Neale Fong is an Australian businessman and public servant. Based in Perth, Western Australia, he formerly served as the West Australian Football Commission chairman and director general of the Department of Health. As of 2023, he is the chairman of the Western Australian Institute of Sport.

== Early life ==
Fong was raised in a working-class Chinese-Australian family. His grandfather migrated from southern China, initially to the Goldfields before moving to Perth where he set up Fong's Greengrocer in Northbridge.

== Education ==
Fong studied at the Balcatta Senior High School and graduated in 1976, serving as School Captain, Athletics Captain and Football First XVIII Captain. He was admitted to UWA Medical School in 1977, and graduated in 1982. In 1988, he moved to Vancouver, British Columbia to undertake graduate theological studies at Regent College, University of British Columbia. He graduated with a Diploma in Christian Studies (DipCS) and a Master of Theological Studies (MTS) with a concentration in Applied Theology. Fong graduated in the University of Western Australia's Graduate School of Management with an MBA in 1996. He also has degrees in medicine and theology.

== Career ==
=== Health services ===
His first medical job was at Royal Perth Hospital where he worked in terms including under Sir George Bedbrook at the RPH(RH) Spinal Unit and at the Port Hedland Regional Hospital. He was then appointed as a Venereologist in the VD Control Branch of the Health Department of WA where he established the first HIV/AIDS assessment clinic in 1985. He was part of a number of state and national committees involved in tackling the HIV/AIDS epidemic in the mid-1980s.

Returning to Perth in 1990, Fong took up roles in the newly named STD Control Branch in the Public Health Division of the Health Department of WA. He was asked to undertake a major review of STD/HIV services in Metropolitan Perth, which resulted in major changes to STD management. He established the inaugural Communicable Diseases Control Section of the Health Department of WA in 2003/04. In 1994, he was recruited to be the Director of Medical Service for the East Metro Health Service. With the resignation of the managing director of the State Health Purchasing Authority in 1995, Fong was appointed to the role and worked on the establishment of the new structure to be led by former Deputy Secretary of the Commonwealth Department of Health Alan Bansemer. Fong was appointed Chief General manager Operations with responsibility for all operational responsibilities with the health services in metro and country WA (the equivalent of a Chief Operating Officer role). After serving three years in this position, Fong was recruited to be the CEO of Australia's largest private hospital at the time, St John of God Subiaco. He led the hospital in a major turnaround including the commencement of a $100M redevelopment program from 2000 to 2004. The first comprehensive cancer centre (later to be named the Bendat Comprehensive Cancer Centre) was established.

In 2004, he was appointed by the Gallop Ministry to implement reform in Western Australia's public health system. He became the executive chairman of the Health Reform and Implementation Taskforce, charged with implementing the recommendations of the Reid Report. He became director-general of the Department of Health, the state's highest-paid public servant with a salary of A$600,000, before resigning over findings alleged misconduct. No corruption charges were identified or laid.

In September 2012, Fong commenced an appointment by Health Solutions WA Pty Ltd (of which he was managing director) as managing director of Peel Health Campus, a private hospital at Mandurah which was also embroiled in allegations of fraud and corruption prior to Fong's appointment, It was found that doctors were being paid $200 per patient as inducement for admissions to the hospital. A subsequent parliamentary inquiry found that the scheme incorrectly generated $1.78 million from the Department of Health, which was able to recover the amount. Within four months, Fong quit, announcing acquisition of the business by Ramsay Health Care.

Fong was appointed to the board of Prime Health, an occupational health and safety company, soon after and established his advisory service (Australis Health Advisory). He has consulted widely in Commonwealth and states on health and hospital and leadership development. Under Health Workforce Australia he held the project to form Australia's first health leadership competency framework (Health LEADS), which endures to this day.

In 2009, he became Chairman of Bethesda Hospital and held this position till 2019 when he was appointed CEO. He was formerly deputy chair of the Bethanie Group, interim CEO of Peel Health Campus and Chair of ASX listed company Chrysalis Resources for 8 years. He has also held a number of other ASX company director positions. In 2010, he led the project for the establishment of the Curtin Medical School, which opened for students on 2017, and was Director of the Curtin Health and Innovation Research Institute (CHIRI) for two years.

In November 2015, he was appointed by the Minister of Health to chair the WA Country Health Service Board, one of five WA Health service boards.

=== Football ===
Fong commenced his career with the West Perth Football Club colts and reserves teams. He was Captain of the Colts team in 1978 and was coached by East Perth legend Ken McCaullay. His brother is former West Perth captain Les Fong. After 12 years as a successful amateur player, he was elected a Commissioner of the West Australian Football Commission from 1999 until 2010, and chairman from 2002 until 2010. He has been described as "one of the most important figures in Western Australian football history". He served as chaplain of the West Coast Eagles Football Club from 1993 to 2014.

=== Youth work ===
Fong was the director and chair of Youth Vision WA from 1990 to 2015, having completed 41 years in youth work in the Churches of Christ.

=== WAIS ===
In September 2023, Fong was appointed chair of the Western Australian Institute of Sport (WAIS).
