= Ernie Foo =

Australian rules footballer

Personal information
- Full name: Ernest Arthur Foo
- Born: 30 July 1891; Fitzroy, Victoria
- Died: 27 February 1934 (aged 42); Caulfield, Victoria
- Original team: YMCA Sydney / Wesley College

Playing career^{1}
Years	Club	Games (Goals)
1914	St Kilda	4 (2)
- ^{1} Playing statistics correct to the end of 1914.

Ernest Arthur Foo (30 July 1891 – 27 February 1934) was an Australian rules footballer who played with St Kilda in the Victorian Football League (VFL).

== Family ==
The son of Thomas Foo and Mary Jane Williams (d. 1917), Ernest Arthur Foo was born in Fitzroy on 30 July 1891. He married Olive Ida Wise in 1914. They were divorced in 1920. He married Lily Edna Hebditch in 1929.

== Military service ==
Foo fought in World War I—having enlisting under the anglicised name "Ernest Arthur Ford"—serving in France in the latter stages of the war.

== Death ==
He died on 27 February 1934 at the Caulfield Military Hospital.
