= Les Fong =

Australian rules footballer

Personal information
- Full name: Leslie Robert Fong
- Born: 24 August 1956 (age 70); Perth
- Original team: Nollamara

Playing career^{1}
Years	Club	Games (Goals)
1973–1987	West Perth	284 (332)

Representative team honours^{2}
Years	Team	Games (Goals)
1977–1983	Western Australia	6 (6)
- ^{1} Playing statistics correct to the end of 1987.^{2} Representative statistics correct as of 1983.

Career highlights
- West Perth premiership side: 1975; West Perth Best & Fairest (1982, 1983); West Perth Captain (1980–86)

Leslie Robert "Les" Fong (born 24 August 1956) is a former Australian rules footballer who played for West Perth Football Club in the West Australian Football League (WAFL).

== Playing career ==
After being recruited from Nollamara, he joined the club in 1973 as a rover in the reserves. Despite being only 16, he played well enough to take the fairest and best award. He made his debut in the senior team in round 8 of the same year against East Fremantle Football Club, becoming the youngest player to represent West Perth at league level. He tasted premiership glory in 1975 when West Perth defeated South Fremantle.

He was club captain from 1980 to 1986 making him the longest serving captain at West Perth, during which he earned the nickname 'Captain Courageous'.

Fong retired after the 1987 season having played 284 games.

== Coaching career ==
After retiring from playing, he began coaching Trinity Aquinas in the Western Australian Amateur Football League. He coached Sunday Football League club Wanneroo to consecutive premierships in 1991 and 1992.

== Honours ==
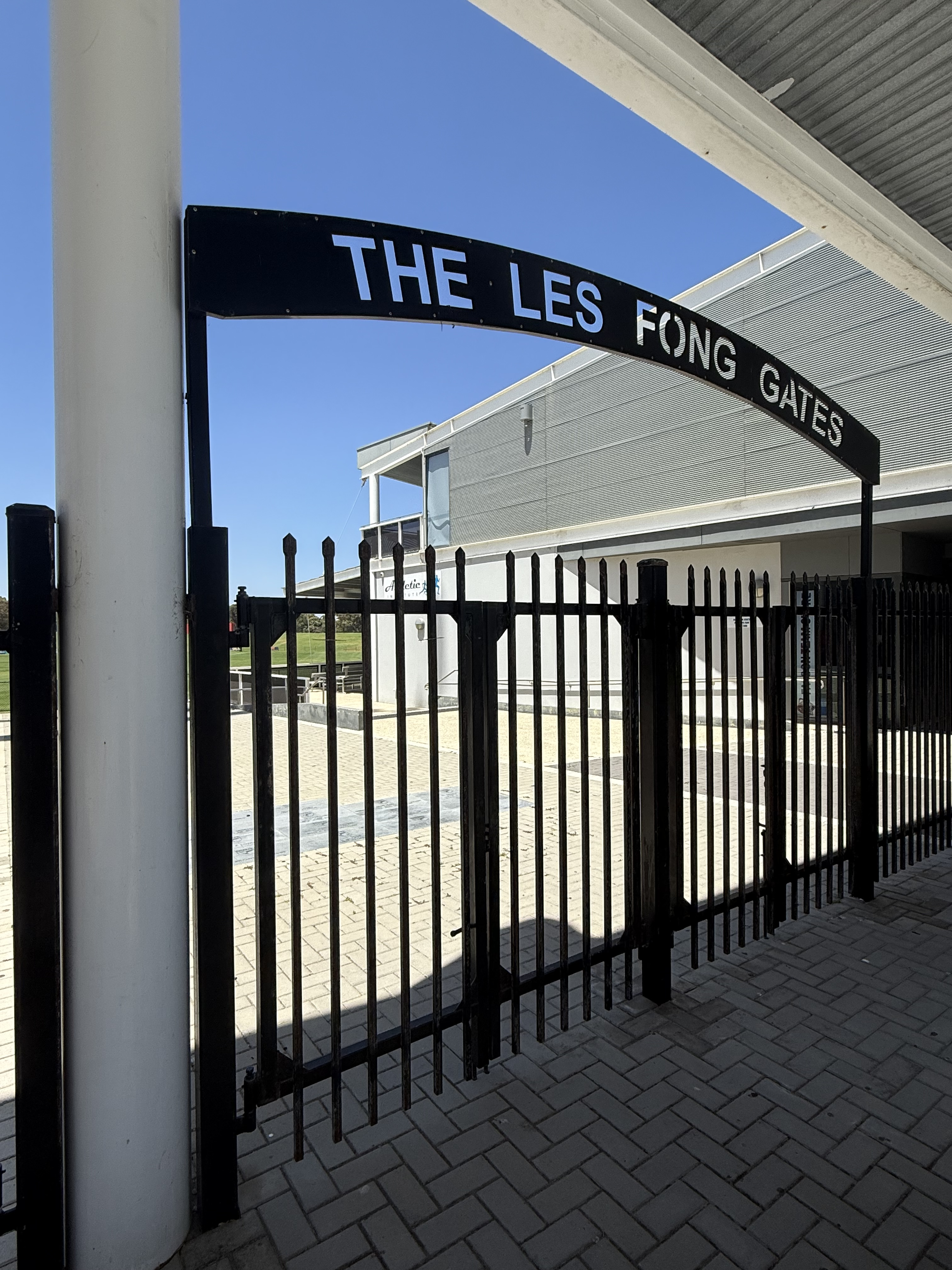
The Les Fong Gates at Pentanet Stadium, January 2025

Fong is the first rover in West Perth's official 'Team of the Century'. Fong was inducted into the West Australian Football Hall of Fame in 2006.

== Family ==
Les is the brother of Neale Fong.
