= Chen Shaoliang =

Australian rules footballer

Chen Shaoliang (Chinese: 陈少良; pinyin: Chén Shàoliáng) is an Australian rules footballer from Guangzhou, China.

Originally a basketballer, Chen Shaoliang first moved to Australian football in 2012 when he was tested in the AFL draft combine held by the AFL China academy, where he placed second in vertical leap.

In 2014, he captained the Chinese national team at the Australian Football International Cup and also played suburban club football both with the Southern Dragons in Melbourne, and the Guangzhou Scorpions in the South China AFL. In early 2016, he was named as an international signing for the Port Adelaide Football Club academy, the first Chinese national to be signed to any AFL club.
