= Georgia Bonora =

Australian gymnast

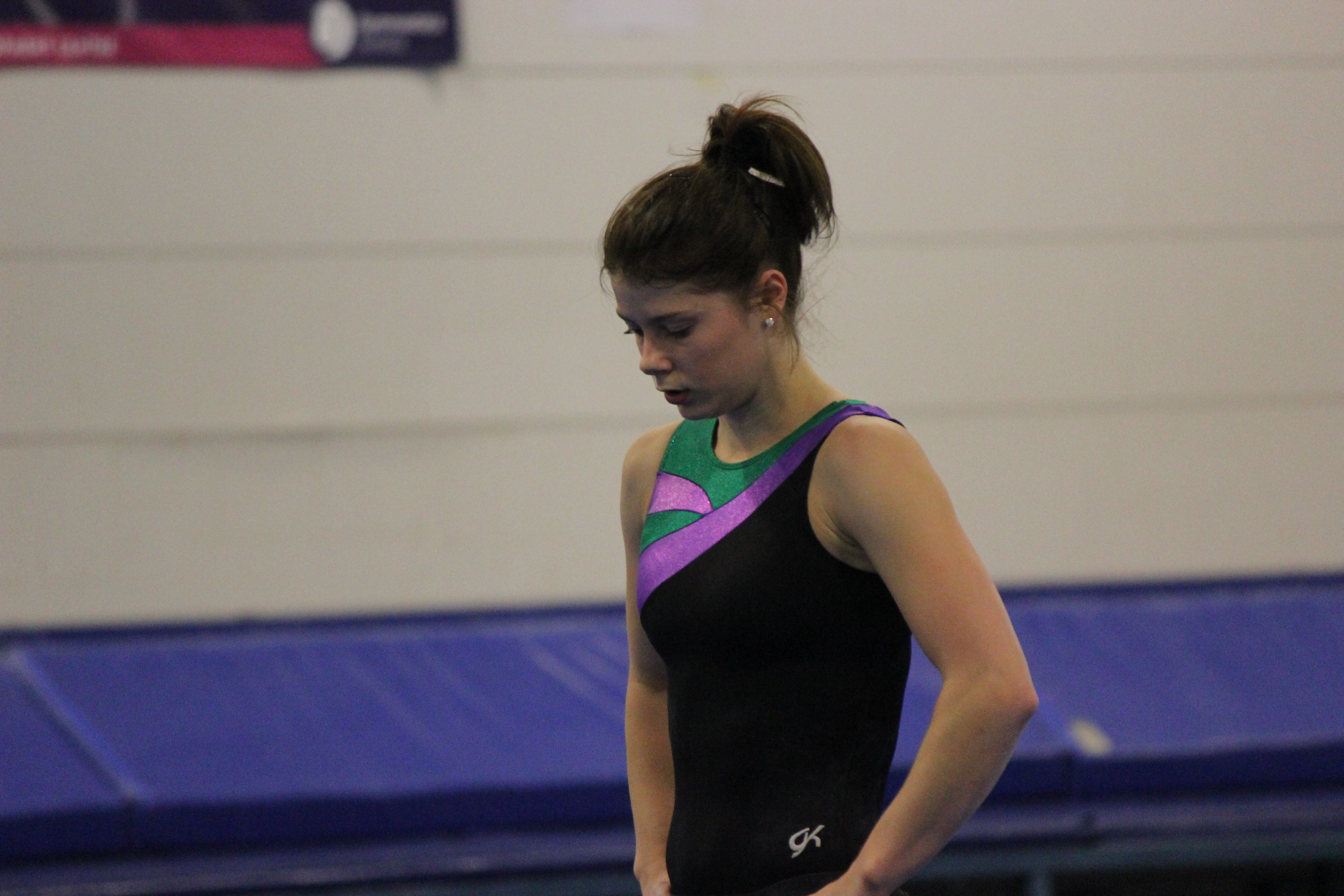

Personal information
- Nickname: Georgie
- Born: 19 May 1990 (age 36) Melbourne, Australia
- Height: 160 cm (5 ft 3 in)

Gymnastics career
- Discipline: Women's artistic gymnastics
- Country represented: Australia
- Club: Waverley Gymnastics Centre
Medal record
Representing Australia
Commonwealth Games
Gold medal – first place	2010 Delhi	Team
Silver medal – second place	2010 Delhi	Uneven Bars
Bronze medal – third place	2010 Delhi	All-Around

Georgia Bonora is an Australian former gymnast who represented Australia at the 2008 Summer Olympics, which took place in Beijing, China, and the 2012 Summer Olympics in London.

== Personal ==
Born in Melbourne on 19 May 1990, Bonora had problems with her ankle in 2011 and 2012.

== Artistic gymnastics ==
Bonora is an all-arounder. She represented Australia in gymnastics at the 2008 Summer Olympics. She did not compete in 2011 because of an ankle injury. As a member of the 2012 Australian senior squad, she was coached by John Hart.

At the 2012 Australian Gymnastics Championships in Sydney, she finished fifth on balance beam and seventh on uneven bars. The event was part of the Australian national team Olympic qualifying process. In mid-June 2012, she was one of twelve Australian gymnasts vying to earn a final spot on the Olympic squad at a training session for the national team at the Australian Institute of Sport. She was selected to represent Australia at the 2012 Summer Olympics in women's artistic gymnastics. She was selected to compete in the women's team event. These were her second Games. Her Olympic training preparations included learning how to deal with flash photography, with strobe lighting used at practice, and being exposed to distracting noises.
