= Wally Koochew =

Australian rules footballer (1887–1932)

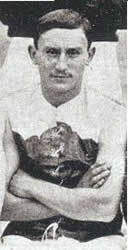
- Wally Koochew in a 1908 Carlton team photo

Personal information
- Full name: Walter John Henry Koochew
- Born: 6 June 1887; Melbourne, Australia
- Died: 13 March 1932 (aged 44); Melbourne, Australia
- Original teams: Macedon (GDFL), Brunswick (VFA)

Playing career^{1}
Years	Club	Games (Goals)
1908	Carlton	4 (2)
- ^{1} Playing statistics correct to the end of 2008.

Walter John Henry "Wally" Koochew (6 July 1887 – 13 March 1932) was an Australian rules footballer, who was the first Victorian Football League player of Chinese background, playing four games for Carlton Football Club in 1908.

== Life and career ==
Koochew was born in Melbourne to a Chinese father, James Koochew, from Guangzhou, China, and Mary Koochew nee. Dalker from Norway.

=== VFL career ===
Koochew played for Gisborne District Football League club Macedon and for Brunswick in the Victoria Football Association (VFA) before his recruitment by Carlton. Carlton were premiers in 1906 and 1907 but Koochew was able to make his debut early in 1908. Upon his selection, a Carlton member, also a member of the Ancient Order of Druids, returned his membership, claiming that by including Koochew on the team Carlton was dealing a death blow to the White Australia Policy.

Such issues did not deter Carlton or Koochew and he was listed as one of Carlton's best players in its Round three win. A rover known for his accurate kicking, Koochew was omitted from the Carlton senior side after four games and two goals. Unable to force his way back into the league team, Koochew returned to Macedon in 1909.

Koochew died in Melbourne Hospital, Carlton in 1932 aged 44. Forgotten for many years, Koochew has recently been recognised by historians for his groundbreaking role in becoming the first VFL/AFL player of Chinese background. Australian rules football fans in China are using Koochew as an example to inspire prospective Chinese players.
