= Jocelyn Hunt =

British artistic gymnast

- Born: 1994 (age 31–32)

Gymnastics career
- Discipline: Women's artistic gymnastics
- Country represented: Great Britain; England (2010–2013)
Medal record
Event	1st	2nd	3rd
Commonwealth Games	0	1	0
European Championships	0	1	0
Total	0	2	0

Jocelyn Hunt (born 1994) is a British artistic gymnast. As a member of the England team she won the silver medal in the team all-around event at the 2010 Commonwealth Games.

== Gymnast ==
Hunt was part of the England Team at the 2010 Commonwealth Games in India where they were placed second. In the same year, shea also won the silver medal in the team all-around event at the 2010 European Women's Artistic Gymnastics Championships in Birmingham, England.

== Retirement ==
Hunt retired from competitive gymnastics in 2013 after a career of 12 years. She planned to go to University of Chichester to study sports psychology.
