= 2011 FIG Artistic Gymnastics World Cup series =

International gymnastics competition series

FIG Artistic Gymnastics World Cup series
- Location: various — see locations
- Date: March 5, 2011 – December 3, 2013 see schedule

The 2011 FIG Artistic Gymnastics World Cup series was a series of stages where events in men's and women's artistic gymnastics were contested.

== World Cup stages ==
Date	Event	Location	Type
5 March	American Cup	Jacksonville, United States	C II – All Around
11–13 March	Turnier Der Meister World Challenge Cup	Cottbus, Germany	C III – Apparatus
19–20 March	Internationaux de France World Challenge Cup	Paris, France	C III – Apparatus
30 March–April 1	Doha World Challenge Cup	Doha, Qatar	C III – Apparatus
14–17 April	Glasgow World Cup	Glasgow, United Kingdom	C II – All Around
13–14 May	Moscow World Cup	Moscow, Russia	C III – Apparatus
3–4 September	Ghent World Challenge Cup	Ghent, Belgium	C III – Apparatus
23–25 September	Salamun Memorial World Challenge Cup	Maribor, Slovenia	C III – Apparatus
4–6 November	Osijek World Challenge Cup	Osijek, Croatia	C III – Apparatus
12–13 November	DTB Cup	Stuttgart, Germany	C II – All Around
26–27 November	Nippon Budoukan World Cup	Tokyo, Japan	C II – All Around
1–3 December	Ostrava World Challenge Cup	Ostrava, Czech Republic	C III – Apparatus

== Medalists ==
=== Men ===
Competition	Event	Gold	Silver	Bronze
Jacksonville	All-around	(United States) Jonathan Horton	(Ukraine) Nikolai Kuksenkov	(United States) Jacob Dalton
Cottbus	Floor exercise	(Greece) Eleftherios Kosmidis	(Croatia) Tomislav Markovic	None awarded
Cottbus	Floor exercise	(Greece) Eleftherios Kosmidis	(Israel) Alexander Shatilov	None awarded
Cottbus	Pommel horse	(China) Zhang Hongtao	(Kazakhstan) Maksim Petrishko	(Slovenia) Sašo Bertoncelj
Cottbus	Rings	(China) Luo Xuan	(Greece) Eleftherios Petrounias	None awarded
Cottbus	Rings	(China) Luo Xuan	(Netherlands) Yuri van Gelder	None awarded
Cottbus	Vault	(Ukraine) Oleksandr Yakubovskyi	None awarded	(Russia) Denis Ablyazin
Cottbus	Vault	(Ukraine) Igor Radivilov	None awarded	(Russia) Denis Ablyazin
Cottbus	Parallel bars	(France) Yann Cucherat	(Uzbekistan) Anton Fokin	(Slovenia) Mitja Petkovšek
Cottbus	Horizontal bar	(Belarus) Aliaksandr Tsarevich	(Austria) Fabian Leimlehner	(France) Gaël Da Silva
Paris	Floor exercise	(Chile) Tomás González	(Romania) Flavius Koczi	(France) Thomas Bouhail
Paris	Pommel horse	(United Kingdom) Louis Smith	(Slovenia) Sašo Bertoncelj	(France) Cyril Tommasone
Paris	Rings	(China) Chen Yibing	(Russia) Aleksandr Balandin	(Italy) Matteo Morandi
Paris	Rings	(China) Chen Yibing	(Russia) Aleksandr Balandin	(Russia) Konstantin Pluzhnikov
Paris	Vault	(Chile) Tomás González	(Romania) Flavius Koczi	(Belarus) Dzmitry Kaspiarovich
Paris	Parallel bars	(Slovenia) Mitja Petkovšek	(China) Feng Zhe	(Netherlands) Epke Zonderland
Paris	Horizontal bar	(Netherlands) Epke Zonderland	(United States) Danell Leyva	(Croatia) Marijo Možnik
Doha	Floor exercise	(China) Zou Kai	(Brazil) Sérgio Sasaki	(China) Liao Qiuhua
Doha	Pommel horse	(Australia) Prashanth Sellathurai	(Slovenia) Sašo Bertoncelj	(China) Liao Qiuhua
Doha	Rings	(Jordan) Ali Al-Asi	(China) Liao Junlin	(China) Liao Qiuhua
Doha	Vault	(Brazil) Sérgio Sasaki	(China) Huang Yuguo	(China) Zou Kai
Doha	Parallel bars	(Germany) Christopher Jursch	(Kazakhstan) Yernar Yerimbetov	(Chile) Felipe Piña
Doha	Horizontal bar	(China) Zou Kai	(China) Chen Xuezhang	(Switzerland) Kevin Rossi
Glasgow	All-around	(United Kingdom) Daniel Purvis	(Germany) Philipp Boy	(Spain) Rafael Martínez
Moscow	Floor exercise	(France) Thomas Bouhail	(Greece) Eleftherios Kosmidis	(Netherlands) Jeffrey Wammes
Moscow	Pommel horse	(Hungary) Krisztián Berki	(Australia) Prashanth Sellathurai	(Croatia) Robert Seligman
Moscow	Rings	(Russia) Konstantin Pluzhnikov	(Russia) Aleksandr Balandin	(Netherlands) Yuri van Gelder
Moscow	Vault	(France) Thomas Bouhail	(South Korea) Yang Hak-seon	(Russia) Anton Golotsutskov
Moscow	Parallel bars	(Poland) Adam Kierzkowski	(Slovenia) Mitja Petkovšek	(France) Yann Cucherat
Moscow	Horizontal bar	(Netherlands) Epke Zonderland	(Croatia) Marijo Možnik	(Ukraine) Nikolai Kuksenkov
Ghent	Floor exercise	(Brazil) Diego Hypólito	(China) Zou Kai	(Greece) Eleftherios Kosmidis
Ghent	Pommel horse	(China) Zhang Hongtao	(Hungary) Krisztián Berki	(Spain) Sergio Muñoz
Ghent	Rings	(Greece) Eleftherios Petrounias	(China) Luo Xuan	(Netherlands) Yuri van Gelder
Ghent	Vault	(Ukraine) Igor Radivilov	(Russia) Anton Golotsutskov	(Brazil) Diego Hypólito
Ghent	Parallel bars	(China) Wang Guanyin	(Slovenia) Mitja Petkovšek	(Uzbekistan) Anton Fokin
Ghent	Parallel bars	(China) Wang Guanyin	(Slovenia) Mitja Petkovšek	(Greece) Vasileios Tsolakidis
Ghent	Horizontal bar	(China) Zou Kai	(Argentina) Nicolás Córdoba	(Spain) Sergio Muñoz
Maribor	Floor exercise	(Slovenia) Rok Klavora	None awarded	(Republic of Ireland) Kieran Behan
Maribor	Floor exercise	(Syria) Fadi Bahlawan	None awarded	(Republic of Ireland) Kieran Behan
Maribor	Pommel horse	(China) Zhang Hongtao	(Hungary) Zoltán Kállai	(Slovenia) Sašo Bertoncelj
Maribor	Rings	(Greece) Eleftherios Petrounias	(China) Liao Junlin	(Germany) Robert Weber
Maribor	Vault	(Germany) Matthias Fahrig	(Poland) Marek Lyszczarz	(China) Huang Yuguo
Maribor	Parallel bars	(China) Wang Guanyin	(Slovenia) Mitja Petkovšek	(Germany) Matthias Fahrig
Maribor	Horizontal bar	(Greece) Vlasios Maras	(Germany) Fabian Leimlehner	(Poland) Roman Kulesza
Osijek	Floor exercise	(Croatia) Tomislav Markovic	(Republic of Ireland) Kieran Behan	(Netherlands) Kas van Weelden
Osijek	Pommel horse	(China) Zhang Hongtao	(Croatia) Robert Seligman	(Slovenia) Sašo Bertoncelj
Osijek	Rings	(Ukraine) Oleksandr Vorobyov	None awarded	(Syria) Suhail Alkurdi
Osijek	Rings	(China) Liao Junlin	None awarded	(Syria) Suhail Alkurdi
Osijek	Vault	(Ukraine) Igor Radivilov	(Germany) Matthias Fahrig	(Poland) Marek Lyszczarz
Osijek	Parallel bars	(China) Wang Guanyin	(Slovenia) Mitja Petkovšek	(Poland) Adam Kierzkowski
Osijek	Horizontal bar	(China) Chen Xuezhang	(Canada) Nathan Gafuik	(Croatia) Marijo Možnik
Stuttgart	All-around	(Japan) Shogo Nonomura	(Germany) Marcel Nguyen	(United Kingdom) Daniel Purvis
Tokyo	All-around	(Japan) Kohei Uchimura	(Germany) Philipp Boy	(United Kingdom) Daniel Purvis
Ostrava	Floor exercise	(Republic of Ireland) Kieran Behan	None awarded	(Ukraine) Oleg Stepko
Ostrava	Floor exercise	(Belarus) Andrey Likhovitskiy	None awarded	(Ukraine) Oleg Stepko
Ostrava	Pommel horse	(Slovenia) Sašo Bertoncelj	(Belarus) Andrey Likhovitskiy	(Japan) Ryosuke Kobayashi
Ostrava	Rings	(Greece) Eleftherios Petrounias	(Japan) Hiroyuki Imai	(Ukraine) Igor Radivilov
Ostrava	Vault	(Spain) Fabian Gonzalez	(Belarus) Andrey Likhovitskiy	(Poland) Marek Lyszczarz
Ostrava	Parallel bars	(Japan) Hiroyuki Imai	(Ukraine) Oleg Stepko	(Belarus) Aliaksandr Tsarevich
Ostrava	Horizontal bar	(Belarus) Aliaksandr Tsarevich	(Czech Republic) Martin Konecny	(Japan) Hiroyuki Imai

=== Women ===
Competition	Event	Gold	Silver	Bronze
Jacksonville	All-around	(United States) Jordyn Wieber	(Russia) Aliya Mustafina	(United States) Aly Raisman
Cottbus	Vault	(Germany) Oksana Chusovitina	(Switzerland) Giulia Steingruber	(Germany) Nadine Jarosch
Cottbus	Uneven bars	(China) Yao Jinnan	(Germany) Elisabeth Seitz	(Germany) Kim Bui
Cottbus	Balance beam	(China) Yao Jinnan	(Netherlands) Céline van Gerner	(Greece) Vasiliki Millousi
Cottbus	Floor exercise	(China) Yao Jinnan	(China) Tan Sixin	None awarded
Cottbus	Floor exercise	(China) Yao Jinnan	(Germany) Elisabeth Seitz	None awarded
Paris	Vault	(Russia) Aliya Mustafina	(Russia) Tatiana Nabieva	(Romania) Diana Chelaru
Paris	Uneven bars	(Russia) Aliya Mustafina	(China) Huang Qiushuang	(Germany) Elisabeth Seitz
Paris	Balance beam	(Russia) Aliya Mustafina	(Romania) Ana Porgras	(Russia) Anna Dementyeva
Paris	Floor exercise	(Romania) Sandra Izbașa	(Romania) Diana Chelaru	(Russia) Anna Dementyeva
Doha	Vault	(Brazil) Daniele Hypólito	(Chile) Makarena Pinto	(Indonesia) Dewi Prahara
Doha	Uneven bars	(China) Tan Sixin	(Australia) Larissa Miller	(China) Yao Jinnan
Doha	Balance beam	(China) Tan Sixin	(Australia) Ashleigh Brennan	(Belgium) Gaelle Mys
Doha	Floor exercise	(China) Yao Jinnan	(Australia) Ashleigh Brennan	(Brazil) Daniele Hypólito
Doha	Floor exercise	(China) Yao Jinnan	(Australia) Ashleigh Brennan	(United Kingdom) Jocelyn Hunt
Glasgow	All-around	(Romania) Amelia Racea	(Venezuela) Jessica López	(Romania) Raluca Haidu
Moscow	Vault	(Uzbekistan) Oksana Chusovitina	(Russia) Ekaterina Kurbatova	(Brazil) Jade Barbosa
Moscow	Uneven bars	(Venezuela) Jessica López	(Russia) Anna Dementyeva	(Czech Republic) Jana Šikulová
Moscow	Balance beam	(Russia) Anna Dementyeva	(Russia) Ksenia Afanasyeva	(Ukraine) Yana Demyanchuk
Moscow	Floor exercise	(Russia) Anna Dementyeva	(Russia) Ksenia Afanasyeva	(Venezuela) Jessica López
Ghent	Vault	(Brazil) Jade Barbosa	(Israel) Valeria Maksyuta	(Brazil) Adrian Gomes
Ghent	Uneven bars	(Russia) Viktoria Komova	(China) Jiang Yuyuan	(China) Wu Liufang
Ghent	Balance beam	(China) Wu Liufang	(Ukraine) Mariya Livchikova	(Uzbekistan) Luiza Galiulina
Ghent	Balance beam	(China) Wu Liufang	(Ukraine) Mariya Livchikova	(Greece) Stefani Bismpikou
Ghent	Floor exercise	(Ukraine) Mariya Livchikova	(China) Wu Liufang	(Brazil) Daiane dos Santos
Maribor	Vault	(Israel) Valeria Maksyuta	(Slovenia) Teja Belak	(Hungary) Orsolya Nagy
Maribor	Uneven bars	(Czech Republic) Kristýna Pálešová	(Israel) Valeria Maksyuta	(Croatia) Tina Erceg
Maribor	Balance beam	(Greece) Vasiliki Millousi	(Israel) Valeria Maksyuta	(Slovenia) Adela Sajn
Maribor	Floor exercise	(Israel) Roni Rabinovitz	(Croatia) Tina Erceg	(Slovenia) Adela Sajn
Osijek	Vault	(Israel) Valeria Maksyuta	(Canada) Brittany Rogers	(Poland) Gabriela Janik
Osijek	Uneven bars	(China) Tan Sixin	(China) Wu Liufang	(Poland) Marta Pihan-Kulesza
Osijek	Balance beam	(China) Tan Sixin	(China) Wu Liufang	(Israel) Valeria Maksyuta
Osijek	Floor exercise	(Poland) Marta Pihan-Kulesza	(China) Tan Sixin	(Croatia) Tina Erceg
Stuttgart	All-around	(China) Huang Qiushuang	(Germany) Kim Bui	(Russia) Yulia Inshina
Tokyo	All-around	(China) Huang Qiushuang	(Japan) Yu Minobe	(Germany) Kim Bui
Ostrava	Vault	(Israel) Valeria Maksyuta	(Slovenia) Teja Belak	(Belarus) Volha Makhautsova
Ostrava	Uneven bars	(Poland) Marta Pihan-Kulesza	(Canada) Bianca Dancose-Giambattisto	(Czech Republic) Kristýna Pálešová
Ostrava	Balance beam	(Israel) Valeria Maksyuta	(Poland) Katarzyna Jurkowska	(Canada) Bianca Dancose-Giambattisto
Ostrava	Floor exercise	(Ukraine) Angelina Kysla	(Ukraine) Alina Fomenko	(Israel) Valeria Maksyuta

== See also ==
- 2011 FIG Rhythmic Gymnastics World Cup series
