= Pacific Rim Championships – Women's balance beam =

Three medals are awarded: gold for first place, silver for second place, and bronze for third place. Tie breakers have not been used in every year. In the event of a tie between two gymnasts, both names are listed, and the following position (second for a tie for first, third for a tie for second) is left empty because a medal was not awarded for that position. If three gymnastics tied for a position, the following two positions are left empty.

== Medalists ==
Year	Location	Gold	Silver	Bronze	Ref.
1998	(Canada) Winnipeg	(Australia) Zeena McLaughlin	(Australia) Melinda Cleland	(United States) Kristen Maloney (China) Peng Sha	
2000	(New Zealand) Christchurch	(China) Bai Chunyue	(Canada) Julie Beaulieu	(Australia) Allana Slater	
2002	(Canada) Vancouver	(United States) Tasha Schwikert	(Australia) Jacqui Dunn	(China) Liu Wei	
2004	(United States) Honolulu	(United States) Carly Patterson	(China) Zhang Yufei	(Australia) Allana Slater	
2006	(United States) Honolulu	(United States) Chellsie Memmel	(United States) Nastia Liukin	(Canada) Elyse Hopfner-Hibbs	
2008	(United States) San Jose	(United States) Nastia Liukin	(China) Huang Qiushuang	(United States) Jana Bieger	
2010	(Australia) Melbourne	(United States) Rebecca Bross	(United States) Aly Raisman	(China) Wu Liufang	
2012	(United States) Everett	(United States) Kyla Ross	(Canada) Peng-Peng Lee	(China) Tan Sixin	
2014	(Canada) Richmond	(United States) Kyla Ross	(China) Xie Yufen	(United States) Elizabeth Price	
2016	(United States) Everett	(United States) Ragan Smith	(United States) Aly Raisman	(Japan) Nagi Kajita	
2018	(Colombia) Medellín	(Australia) Talia Folino	(Mexico) Paulina Campos	(United States) Jordan Chiles	
2024	(Colombia) Cali	(United States) Kieryn Finnell	(Canada) Amy Jorgensen	(United States) Jayla Hang	
