= 2011 European Artistic Gymnastics Championships – Women's qualification =

The women's qualification round at the 2011 European Artistic Gymnastics Championships was held on 6 April 2011.

== Individual all-around ==
Rank	Gymnast	Nation	Vault (gymnastics)	Uneven bars	Balance beam	Floor (gymnastics)	Total	Qual.
1	Aliya Mustafina	Russia	14.725	15.600	14.900	14.525	59.750	Q
2	Anna Dementyeva	Russia	13.600	14.450	14.825	14.025	56.900	Q
3	Diana Chelaru	Romania	14.400	13.650	13.900	14.400	56.350	Q
4	Elisabeth Seitz	Germany	14.675	14.475	13.050	13.650	55.850	Q
5	Julie Croket	Belgium	13.925	13.500	14.250	13.950	55.625	Q
6	Yulia Belokobylskaya	Russia	13.700	13.500	14.075	14.275	55.550	-
7	Carlotta Ferlito	Italy	13.500	13.225	14.800	13.850	55.375	Q
8	Vanessa Ferrari	Italy	13.900	13.900	13.950	13.475	55.225	Q
9	Ariella Kaeslin	Switzerland	14.775	13.650	14.300	12.475	55.200	Q
10	Giulia Steingruber	Switzerland	15.175	13.300	12.825	13.575	54.875	Q
11	Céline van Gerner	Netherlands	13.525	13.925	13.625	13.600	54.675	Q
12	Hannah Whelan	Great Britain	13.600	13.800	14.225	12.775	54.400	Q
13	Aagje Vanwalleghem	Belgium	13.900	14.350	12.425	13.500	54.175	Q
14	Vasiliki Millousi	Greece	12.850	13.775	14.325	12.975	53.925	Q
15	Marta Pihan-Kulesza	Poland	13.525	13.400	14.200	12.575	53.700	Q
16	Chiara Gandolfi	Italy	13.475	13.650	13.225	13.025	53.375	-
17	Danusia Francis	Great Britain	13.525	12.950	13.900	12.875	53.250	Q
18	Jonna Adlerteg	Sweden	13.375	13.500	13.225	13.075	53.175	Q
19	Elisabetta Preziosa	Italy	13.300	11.625	14.375	13.525	52.825	-
20	Marine Brevet	France	13.575	12.975	13.525	12.650	52.725	Q
21	Jennifer Pinches	Great Britain	13.400	13.275	13.225	12.800	52.700	-
22	Veronica Wagner	Sweden	13.575	12.875	13.375	12.850	52.675	Q
23	Dorina Böczögő	Hungary	13.525	13.275	13.325	12.425	52.550	Q
24	Jana Šikulová	Czech Republic	13.575	13.375	12.650	12.875	52.475	Q
25	Stefani Bismpikou	Greece	13.425	13.000	12.675	13.125	52.225	Q
26	Amelia Racea	Romania	14.525	12.675	13.875	10.925	52.000	Q
27	Yvette Moshage	Netherlands	13.625	13.325	11.600	13.375	51.925	Q
28	Valeriia Maksiuta	Israel	13.875	11.700	12.925	13.200	51.700	Q
29	Gabriela Janik	Poland	13.700	13.125	13.025	11.825	51.675	R
30	Nadine Jarosch	Germany	14.025	11.625	12.250	13.700	51.600	R
31	Tünde Csillag	Hungary	13.600	11.925	12.200	13.775	51.500	R
32	Ainhoa Carmona Urbano	Spain	13.300	12.275	13.050	12.750	51.375	R

== Vault ==
Rank	Gymnast	Nation	D Score	E Score	Pen.	Score 1	D Score	E Score	Pen.	Score 2	Total	Qual.
Rank	Gymnast	Nation	Vault 1				Vault 2				Total	Qual.
1	Giulia Steingruber	Switzerland	6.300	8.875		15.175	5.200	8.675		13.875	14.525	Q
2	Sandra Izbaşa	Romania	5.800	8.725		14.525	5.600	8.925		14.525	14.525	Q
3	Aliya Mustafina	Russia	5.800	8.925		14.725	6.100	8.650	0.5	14.250	14.487	Q
4	Ariella Kaeslin	Switzerland	6.300	8.475		14.775	5.000	8.625		13.625	14.200	Q
5	Oksana Chusovitina	Germany	5.900	8.250		14.150	5.500	8.750		14.250	14.200	Q
6	Tatiana Nabieva	Russia	5.800	8.700		14.500	5.200	8.675		13.875	14.187	Q
7	Elisabeth Seitz	Germany	5.800	8.875		14.675	5.000	8.675		13.675	14.175	Q
8	Amelia Racea	Romania	5.800	8.725		14.525	4.800	8.550		13.350	13.937	Q
9	Julie Croket	Belgium	5.300	8.625		13.925	5.300	8.600		13.900	13.912	R
10	Nastassia Marachkouskaya	Belarus	5.300	8.925		14.225	4.600	8.750		13.350	13.787	R
11	Diana Chelaru	Romania	5.800	8.600		14.400	4.600	8.500		13.100	13.750	-
12	Claudia Menéndez González	Spain	5.800	8.500		14.300	4.600	8.325		12.925	13.612	R

== Uneven bars ==
Rank	Gymnast	Nation	D Score	E Score	Pen.	Total	Qual.
1	Aliya Mustafina	Russia	6.800	8.800		15.600	Q
2	Beth Tweddle	Great Britain	7.100	8.450		15.550	Q
3	Tatiana Nabieva	Russia	6.500	8.875		15.375	Q
4	Elisabeth Seitz	Germany	6.600	7.875		14.475	Q
5	Anna Dementyeva	Russia	5.900	8.550		14.450	-
6	Kim Bui	Germany	6.100	8.350		14.450	Q
7	Aagje Vanwalleghem	Belgium	6.200	8.150		14.350	Q
8	Céline van Gerner	Netherlands	5.800	8.125		13.925	Q
9	Vanessa Ferrari	Italy	5.800	8.100		13.900	Q
10	Hannah Whelan	Great Britain	5.700	8.100		13.800	R
11	Vasiliki Millousi	Greece	5.400	8.375		13.775	R
12	Chiara Gandolfi	Italy	5.400	8.250		13.650	R

== Balance beam ==
Rank	Gymnast	Nation	D Score	E Score	Pen.	Total	Qual.
1	Aliya Mustafina	Russia	6.200	8.700		14.900	Q
2	Anna Dementyeva	Russia	6.300	8.525		14.825	Q
3	Carlotta Ferlito	Italy	6.100	8.700		14.800	Q
4	Elisabetta Preziosa	Italy	5.800	8.575		14.375	Q
5	Vasiliki Millousi	Greece	6.000	8.325		14.325	Q
6	Ariella Kaeslin	Switzerland	6.000	8.300		14.300	Q
7	Julie Croket	Belgium	5.900	8.350		14.250	Q
8	Hannah Whelan	Great Britain	5.900	8.325		14.225	Q
9	Marta Pihan-Kulesza	Poland	6.100	8.100		14.200	R
10	Yana Demyanchuk	Ukraine	5.900	8.275		14.175	R
11	Sandra Izbaşa	Romania	5.500	8.600		14.100	R

== Floor exercise ==
Rank	Gymnast	Nation	D Score	E Score	Pen.	Total	Qual.
1	Sandra Izbaşa	Romania	5.800	8.800		14.600	Q
2	Aliya Mustafina	Russia	5.800	8.725		14.525	Q
3	Diana Chelaru	Romania	5.900	8.500		14.400	Q
4	Yulia Belokobylskaya	Russia	5.900	8.375		14.275	Q
5	Anna Dementyeva	Russia	5.700	8.325		14.025	-
6	Julie Croket	Belgium	5.600	8.350		13.950	Q
7	Carlotta Ferlito	Italy	5.500	8.350		13.850	Q
8	Beth Tweddle	Great Britain	5.700	8.250	0.1	13.850	Q
9	Tünde Csillag	Hungary	5.500	8.275		13.775	Q
10	Nadine Jarosch	Germany	5.500	8.200		13.700	R
11	Elisabeth Seitz	Germany	5.500	8.150		13.650	R
12	Céline van Gerner	Netherlands	5.400	8.400	0.2	13.600	R
