= 2012 FIG Artistic Gymnastics World Cup series =

International gymnastics competition series

FIG Artistic Gymnastics World Cup series
- Location: various — see locations
- Date: March 3 – December 8, 2012 see schedule

The 2012 FIG Artistic Gymnastics World Cup series was a series of stages where events in men's and women's artistic gymnastics were contested.

== World Cup stages ==
Date	Event	Location	Type
3 March	American Cup	New York City, United States	C II – All Around
22–25 March	Turnier der Meister World Challenge Cup	Cottbus, Germany	C III – Apparatus
28–30 March	Doha World Challenge Cup	Doha, Qatar	C III – Apparatus
7–8 April	Zibo World Challenge Cup	Zibo, China	C III – Apparatus
27–29 April	Osijek World Challenge Cup	Osijek, Croatia	C III – Apparatus
1–3 June	Salamun Memorial World Challenge Cup	Maribor, Slovenia	C III – Apparatus
9–10 June	Ghent World Challenge Cup	Ghent, Belgium	C III – Apparatus
23–24 November	Ostrava World Challenge Cup	Ostrava, Czech Republic	C III – Apparatus
1–2 December	DTB-Pokal World Cup	Stuttgart, Germany	C II – All Around
8 December	Glasgow World Cup	Glasgow, United Kingdom	C II – All Around

== Medalists ==
=== Men ===
Competition	Event	Gold	Silver	Bronze
New York	All-around	(United States) Danell Leyva	(Ukraine) Nikolai Kuksenkov	(Germany) Marcel Nguyen
Cottbus	Floor exercise	(Germany) Philipp Boy	(Chile) Tomás González	(Croatia) Tomislav Markovic
Cottbus	Pommel horse	(China) Xiao Qin	(United Kingdom) Daniel Keatings	(United Kingdom) Max Whitlock
Cottbus	Rings	(China) Chen Yibing	(Brazil) Arthur Zanetti	(Greece) Eleftherios Petrounias
Cottbus	Vault	(Ukraine) Igor Radivilov	(Belarus) Dzmitry Kaspiarovich	(Chile) Tomás González
Cottbus	Parallel bars	(Slovenia) Mitja Petkovšek	(Ukraine) Oleg Stepko	(France) Cyril Vieu
Cottbus	Horizontal bar	(Netherlands) Epke Zonderland	(United States) Paul Ruggeri	(United States) John Orozco
Doha	Floor exercise	(China) Zou Kai	(Croatia) Tomislav Markovic	(Romania) Vlad Cotuna
Doha	Pommel horse	(Slovenia) Sašo Bertoncelj	(China) Liao Qiuhua	(France) Cyril Tommasone
Doha	Rings	(China) Liao Qiuhua	(Armenia) Vahagn Davtyan	(France) Danny Rodrigues
Doha	Vault	(China) Du Wei	(Armenia) Artur Davtyan	(Poland) Marek Lyszczarz
Doha	Parallel bars	(China) Guo Weiyang	(France) Yann Cucherat	(Switzerland) Claudio Capelli
Doha	Horizontal bar	(China) Zou Kai	(France) Yann Cucherat	(China) Guo Weiyang
Zibo	Floor exercise	(Romania) Flavius Koczi (United States) Steven Legendre	—N/a	(Israel) Alexander Shatilov
Zibo	Pommel horse	(Hungary) Krisztián Berki	(United Kingdom) Louis Smith	(Slovenia) Sašo Bertoncelj
Zibo	Rings	(China) Chen Yibing	(Greece) Eleftherios Petrounias	(Netherlands) Yuri van Gelder
Zibo	Vault	(Ukraine) Igor Radivilov	(United States) Steven Legendre	(Romania) Flavius Koczi
Zibo	Parallel bars	(China) Feng Zhe	(Slovenia) Mitja Petkovšek	(China) Zhang Chenglong
Zibo	Horizontal bar	(China) Zhang Chenglong	(Ukraine) Nikolai Kuksenkov	(Canada) Jackson Payne
Osijek	Floor exercise	(United Kingdom) Daniel Purvis (Greece) Eleftherios Kosmidis	—N/a	(Chile) Tomás González
Osijek	Pommel horse	(Slovenia) Sašo Bertoncelj	(Belgium) Donna-Donny Truyens (Ukraine) Nikolai Kuksenkov	—N/a
Osijek	Rings	(Brazil) Arthur Zanetti	(France) Samir Aït Saïd	(Greece) Eleftherios Petrounias
Osijek	Vault	(Chile) Tomás González	(Poland) Marek Lyszczarz	(United Kingdom) Kristian Thomas (United Kingdom) Ruslan Panteleymonov
Osijek	Parallel bars	(Slovenia) Mitja Petkovšek (Mexico) Daniel Corral	—N/a	(Romania) Marius Berbecar
Osijek	Horizontal bar	(Greece) Vlasios Maras	(France) Yann Cucherat	(Germany) Andreas Bretschneider
Maribor	Floor exercise	(Puerto Rico) Rafael Casado	(Ukraine) Oleksandr Suprun	(Brazil) Renato Oliveira
Maribor	Pommel horse	(Australia) Prashanth Sellathurai	(United Kingdom) Louis Smith	(Hungary) Krisztián Berki
Maribor	Rings	(Brazil) Arthur Zanetti	(Puerto Rico) Tommy Ramos	(Argentina) Federico Molinari
Maribor	Vault	(China) Lin Chaopan	(Poland) Marek Lyszczarz	(Finland) Tomi Tuuha
Maribor	Parallel bars	(Slovenia) Mitja Petkovšek	(China) Wang Peng (Poland) Adam Kierzkowski	—N/a
Maribor	Horizontal bar	(Netherlands) Epke Zonderland	(Croatia) Marijo Možnik	(Ukraine) Maksym Semiankiv
Ghent	Floor exercise	(Greece) Eleftherios Kosmidis	(Spain) Isaac Botella	(Puerto Rico) Angel Ramos
Ghent	Pommel horse	(China) Zhang Hongtao	(United Kingdom) Daniel Keatings	(Australia) Prashanth Sellathurai
Ghent	Rings	(Brazil) Arthur Zanetti	(Greece) Eleftherios Petrounias	(Argentina) Federico Molinari
Ghent	Vault	(China) Cheng Ran	(Chile) Tomás González	(Vietnam) Nguyễn Hà Thanh
Ghent	Parallel bars	(Vietnam) Phạm Phước Hưng	(Netherlands) Epke Zonderland	(China) Liu Rongbing
Ghent	Horizontal bar	(Netherlands) Epke Zonderland	(China) Liu Rongbing	(Belarus) Aleksandr Tsarevich
Ostrava	Floor exercise	(Japan) Ryuzo Sejima	(Brazil) Arthur Zanetti	(Greece) Eleftherios Kosmidis
Ostrava	Pommel horse	(Belarus) Andrey Likhovitskiy	(Belgium) Donna-Donny Truyens	(Japan) Takuto Kakitani
Ostrava	Rings	(Greece) Eleftherios Petrounias	(Brazil) Arthur Zanetti	(Ukraine) Oleksandr Vorobiov
Ostrava	Vault	(Vietnam) Nguyễn Hà Thanh	(Poland) Marek Lyszczarz	(Austria) Michael Fussenegger
Ostrava	Parallel bars	(Ukraine) Oleg Verniaiev	(Vietnam) Nguyễn Hà Thanh	(Poland) Adam Kierzkowski
Ostrava	Horizontal bar	(Netherlands) Bart Deurloo	(Japan) Kazuyuki Takeda	(Croatia) Marijo Možnik (Belarus) Aleksandr Tsarevich
Stuttgart	All-around	(Germany) Marcel Nguyen	(United Kingdom) Daniel Purvis	(Russia) David Belyavskiy
Glasgow	All-around	(Germany) Marcel Nguyen	(Japan) Kazuhito Tanaka	(United Kingdom) Daniel Purvis

=== Women ===
Competition	Event	Gold	Silver	Bronze
New York	All-around	(United States) Jordyn Wieber	(United States) Alexandra Raisman	(Romania) Larisa Iordache
Cottbus	Vault	(Canada) Brittany Rogers	(Belarus) Nastassia Marachkouskaya	(Spain) Claudia Menendez
Cottbus	Uneven bars	(Germany) Elisabeth Seitz	(Netherlands) Céline van Gerner	(Ukraine) Natalia Kononenko
Cottbus	Balance beam	(Greece) Vasiliki Millousi	(Israel) Valeria Maksyuta	(Canada) Brittany Rogers
Cottbus	Floor exercise	(Romania) Diana Chelaru	(Uzbekistan) Luiza Galiulina	(Germany) Kim Bui (Canada) Dominique Pegg
Doha	Vault	(Switzerland) Giulia Steingruber	(Germany) Nadine Jarosch	(Slovenia) Teja Belak
Doha	Uneven bars	(United Kingdom) Beth Tweddle	(China) Jiang Yuyuan	(Germany) Lisa Hill
Doha	Balance beam	(Romania) Cătălina Ponor	(Australia) Ashleigh Brennan	(Poland) Marta Pihan-Kulesza
Doha	Floor exercise	(Romania) Cătălina Ponor	(Romania) Diana Bulimar	(China) Jiang Yuyuan
Zibo	Vault	(China) Fei Cheng	(Mexico) Alexa Moreno	(Dominican Republic) Yamilet Peña
Zibo	Uneven bars	(China) Yao Jinnan	(China) Huang Qiushuang	(Australia) Larrissa Miller
Zibo	Balance beam	(China) Yao Jinnan	(China) Huang Qiushuang	(Australia) Lauren Mitchell
Zibo	Floor exercise	(Australia) Lauren Mitchell	(Canada) Victoria Moors	(China) Huang Qiushuang
Osijek	Vault	(Canada) Ellie Black	(Switzerland) Giulia Steingruber	(Brazil) Laís Souza
Osijek	Uneven bars	(Canada) Peng Peng Lee	(Poland) Marta Pihan-Kulesza	(Czech Republic) Jana Šikulová
Osijek	Balance beam	(Switzerland) Giulia Steingruber	(Greece) Vasiliki Millousi	(Switzerland) Jessica Diacci
Osijek	Floor exercise	(Switzerland) Giulia Steingruber (Canada) Ellie Black	—N/a	(Spain) Silvia Colussi
Maribor	Vault	(Slovenia) Teja Belak	(Hungary) Dorina Böczögő	(Croatia) Tijana Tkalcek
Maribor	Uneven bars	(Netherlands) Céline van Gerner	(Poland) Marta Pihan-Kulesza	(Argentina) Valeria Pereyra
Maribor	Balance beam	(Netherlands) Céline van Gerner	(Poland) Katarzyna Jurkowska	(Slovenia) Teja Belak
Maribor	Floor exercise	(Croatia) Tina Erceg	(Poland) Marta Pihan-Kulesza	(Netherlands) Lisa Top
Ghent	Vault	(Mexico) Alexa Moreno	(Switzerland) Giulia Steingruber	(Belarus) Alina Sotnikava
Ghent	Uneven bars	(Netherlands) Céline van Gerner	(Poland) Marta Pihan-Kulesza	(Sweden) Ida Gustafsson
Ghent	Balance beam	(Romania) Cătălina Ponor	(Romania) Diana Bulimar	(Greece) Vasiliki Millousi
Ghent	Floor exercise	(Romania) Diana Bulimar	(Netherlands) Lisa Top (Slovenia) Saša Golob	—N/a
Ostrava	Vault	(Vietnam) Phan Thị Hà Thanh	(Chile) Barbara Achondo	(Chile) Makarena Pinto
Ostrava	Uneven bars	(Czech Republic) Kristýna Pálešová	(Netherlands) Lisa Top	(Sweden) Ida Gustafsson
Ostrava	Balance beam	(Czech Republic) Kristýna Pálešová	(Netherlands) Sanne Wevers	(Sweden) Ida Gustafsson
Ostrava	Floor exercise	(Chile) Barbara Achondo	(Austria) Lisa Ecker	(Czech Republic) Krystyna Sankova
Stuttgart	All-around	(United States) Elizabeth Price	(Germany) Elisabeth Seitz	(Switzerland) Giulia Steingruber
Glasgow	All-around	(United States) Elizabeth Price	(Germany) Elisabeth Seitz	(Germany) Kim Bui

== See also ==
- 2012 FIG Rhythmic Gymnastics World Cup series
