= Krystyna Sankova =

Ukrainian artistic gymnast

- Born: 7 July 1996 (age 30) Alchevsk, Luhansk Oblast, Ukraine

Gymnastics career
- Discipline: Women's artistic gymnastics
- Country represented: Ukraine
- Retired: yes

Krystyna Sankova (Ukrainian: Кристина Санкова; born 7 July 1996) is a Ukrainian former artistic gymnast.

== Gymnastics career ==
Sankova competed at the 2010 European Junior Championships and finished 12th in the all-around final. She competed at the 2012 FIG World Cup in Cottbus, and she finished 6th in the vault final. She competed at the 2012 European Championships alongside Yevheniya Cherniy, Alina Fomenko, Nataliya Kononenko, and Mariya Livchikova, and the team finished 10th. She won the bronze medal on floor exercise at the FIG World Cup in Ostrava behind Barbara Achondo Andino and Lisa Ecker.

Sankova competed at the 2013 Stella Zakharova Cup where she won the bronze medal in the all-around behind Aliya Mustafina and Anna Dementyeva, and she won the gold medal on the balance beam and the silver medal on the floor exercise. She then competed at the 2013 European Championships and finished 8th in the floor exercise final. At the FIG World Cup in Osijek, she won the bronze medal on beam and the silver medal on floor exercise. She competed at the 2013 World Championships where she placed 10th on the balance beam in the qualification round, making her the second reserve for the event final.

Sankova competed at the 2014 European Championships alongside Yana Fedorova, Angelina Kysla, Olesya Sazonova, and Olena Vasylieva, and the team finished 18th. Then, she competed at the 2014 World Championships with Fedorova, Kysla, Sazonova, Anastasiya Ilnytska, and Daria Matveieva, where they finished 27th. At the 2014 Sokol Grand Prix, she competed with Maksym Semiankiv, and they won the team gold medal.

Sankova competed at the 2015 European Championships, and she qualified for the all-around final where she finished 23rd. She then competed at the 2015 European Games with Angelina Kysla and Yana Fedorova, and they finished 14th in the team competition.

== Eponymous skill ==
Sankova has one eponymous skill listed in the Code of Points.

Apparatus	Name	Description	Difficulty (Note: Valid for the 2025–2028 Code of Points)	Added to the Code of Points
Floor exercise	Sankova	Change leg ring leap with ½ turn (180⁰)	D (0.4)	2013 World Championships
