= Emily Little =

Australian artistic gymnast

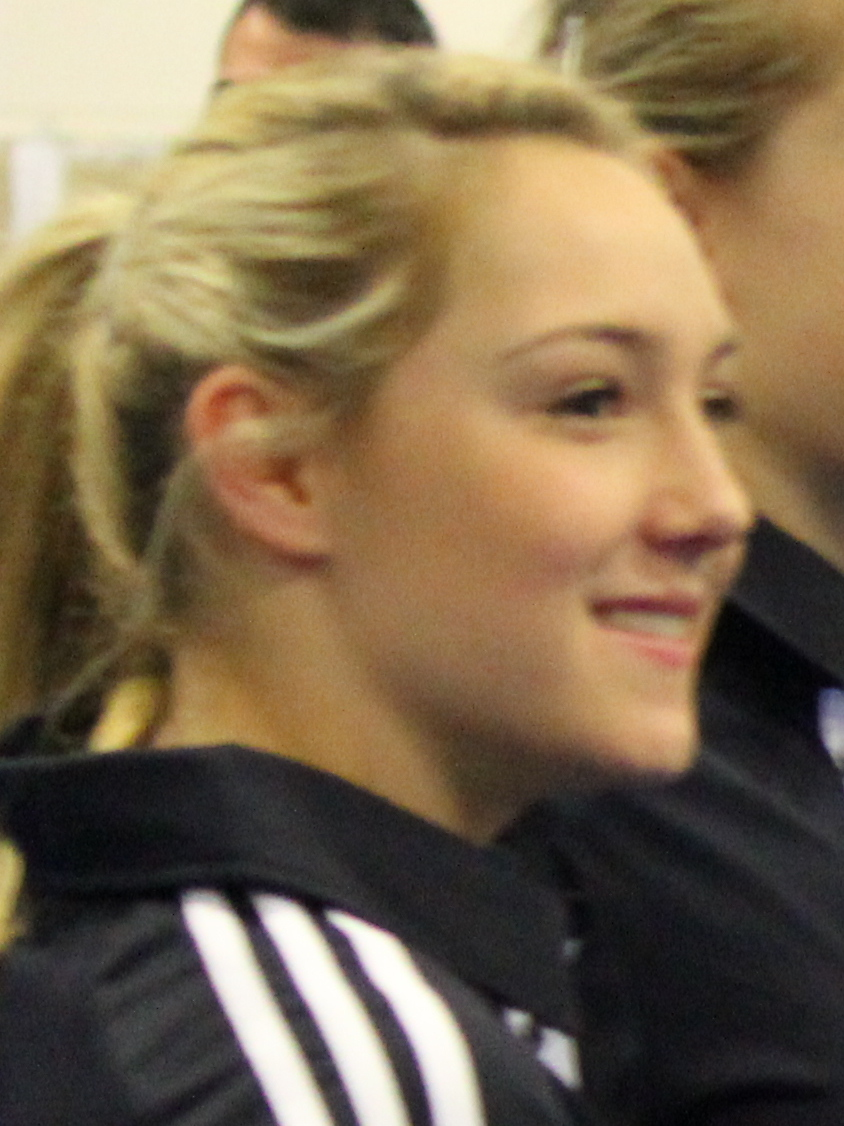
- Emily Little,21 June 2012 at the Australian Institute of Sport Gymnastic Centre for the press event announcing the artistic gymnastics team for the London 2012 Summer Olympics.

Personal information
- Born: 29 March 1994 (age 32) Perth, Western Australia
- Height: 5 ft 0 in (152 cm)

Gymnastics career
- Discipline: Women's artistic gymnastics
- Country represented: Australia; (2009)
- Club: Western Australian Institute of Sport, Perth; Australian Institute of Sport, Canberra
- Gym: Western Australian Institute of Sport, Perth; Australian Institute of Sport, Canberra
- World ranking: 13 (2014 - 2015)
Medal record
Representing Australia
Commonwealth Games
Gold medal – first place	2010 Delhi	Team
Silver medal – second place	2010 Delhi	All-Around
Pacific Rim Championships
Silver medal – second place	2010 Melbourne	Vault
Bronze medal – third place	2010 Melbourne	Team
Bronze medal – third place	2016 Everett	Team
World Cup
Gold medal – first place	2016 Cottbus	Vault
Gold medal – first place	2017 Melbourne	Floor Exercise
Silver medal – second place	2017 Melbourne	Floor Exercise
Silver medal – second place	2017 Baku	Floor exercise
Silver medal – second place	2017 Baku	Vault
Silver medal – second place	2017 Doha	Vault
Silver medal – second place	2017 Doha	Floor Exercise
Bronze medal – third place	2016 Cottbus	Floor Exercise
Bronze medal – third place	2017 Melbourne	Balance Beam
Bronze medal – third place	2017 Baku	Balance beam

Emily Little (born 29 March 1994) is an Australian artistic gymnast. She won a gold medal at the 2010 Commonwealth Games in the team women's artistic gymnastic events. She was chosen to represent Australia at the 2012 Summer Olympics.

== Personal ==
Little, nicknamed Em, was born on 29 March 1994 in Perth, Western Australia, and continues to reside there. She attended City Beach Primary School and then went to high school at Churchlands Senior High School. She is 152 centimetres (60 in) tall, and weighs 52 kilograms (115 lb).

== Artistic gymnastics ==
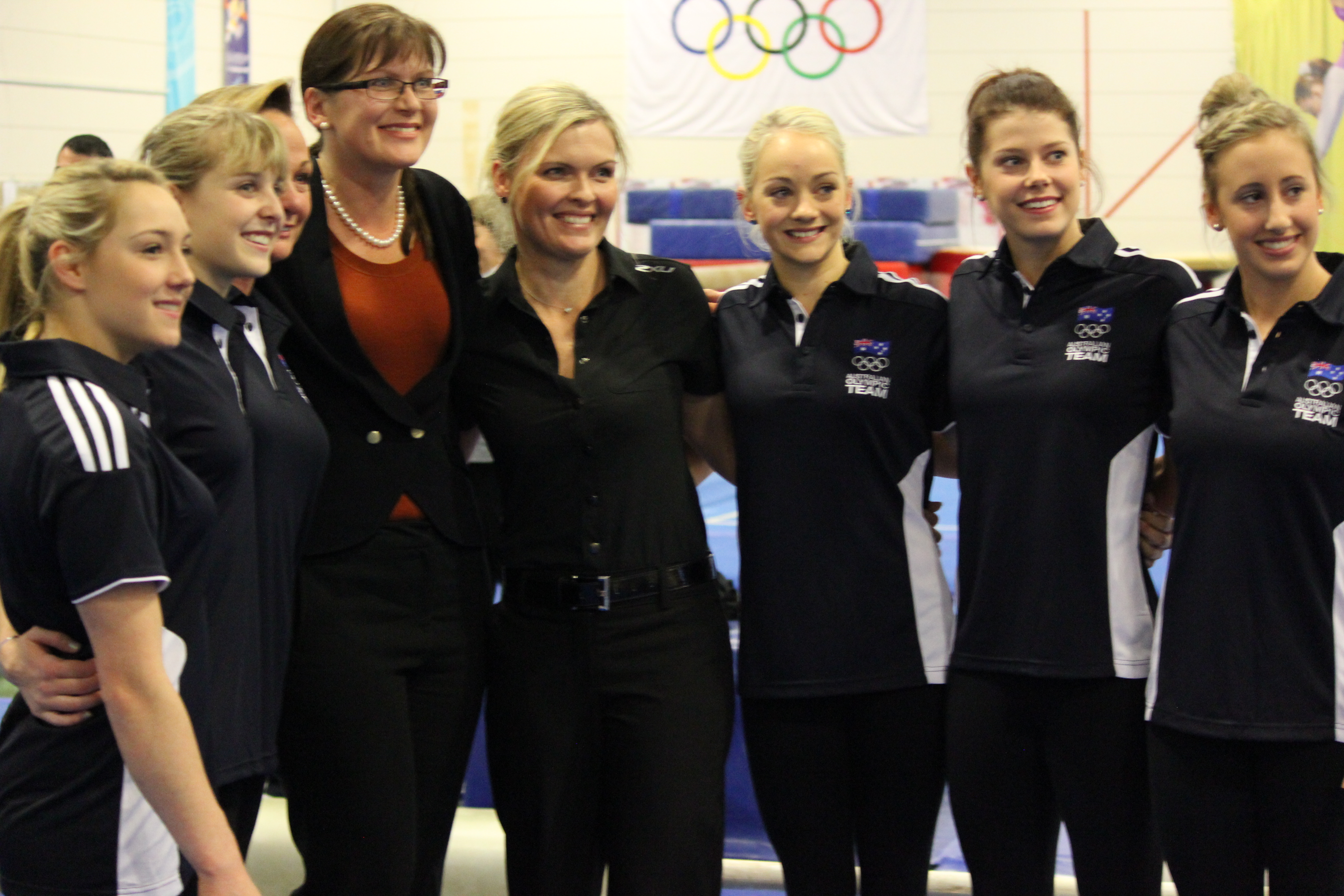
Little (far-left) with Kate Lundy and Australian Olympic teammates

Little is an Australian artistic gymnast, who has had a scholarship with the Western Australian Institute of Sport and the Australian Institute of Sport. Based out of Perth, she has been coached by Martine George and Nikolai Lapchine since 2003.

Little has been a member of the Australian senior national team for four years. As a member of the 2012 Australian senior squad going to the Olympics, she was coached by Peggy Liddick. She is often the lead-off gymnast. She won a gold medal at the 2010 Commonwealth Games in the team event, and a silver medal in the individual all around competition. At the 2010 and 2011 Artistic World Championships, she was a member of the Australian team that finished sixth place each time.

At the 2012 Australian Gymnastics Championships in Sydney, Little finished second in the all around event. She earned a pair of silver medals in the floor and vault events. At the event, she introduced several new elements into her routines. The event was part of the Australian national team Olympic qualifying process. In mid-June 2012, Little was one of twelve Australian gymnasts vying to earn a final spot on the Olympic squad at a training session for the national team at the Australian Institute of Sport. In mid-June 2012, she was one of three Australian female gymnasts who were confirmed to be going to the Games alongside Lauren Mitchell and Ashleigh Brennan.

Little represented Australia at the 2012 Summer Olympics in women's artistic gymnastics as an eighteen-year-old. She was selected to compete in the women's team event. Her Olympic training preparations included learning how to deal with flash photography, with strobe lighting used during practice, and being exposed to distracting noises.

In March 2015, Emily Little was invited to compete at the AT&T American Cup alongside many all around world champions like Simone Biles and Vanessa Ferrari. This being Little's second international competition since 2012 was very successful as she placed seventh in front of Commonwealth Games all around champion, Claudia Fragapane.

In May 2015, Little competed in the Australian Gymnastics Championships, she was in second place during the day 1 competition and held on to finish second in All Around finals behind Queensland's Georgia Godwin. She represented Western Australia, although there were not enough gymnasts to make a full team. She qualified for vault finals and won with a 15.3 scoring Yurchenko double twisting layout. She also qualified for bar finals placing sixth. In beam finals, Little placed third in front of world beam silver medalist, Lauren Mitchell. Little competed a full twisting double layout in floor finals (only her third time competing this move) and placed in second behind 2010 world floor champion, Lauren Mitchell.

In 2017, at the Australian National Championships, Little broke her neck on a mistimed flip during her floor routine.
