= Mariya Livchikova =

Ukrainian artistic gymnast

- Full name: Mariya Livchikova
- Nickname: Masha
- Born: 28 April 1995 (age 31) Horlivka, Ukraine

Gymnastics career
- Discipline: Women's artistic gymnastics
- Country represented: Ukraine (2009-2014)
- Head coach: Igor Korobchynskyy
- Former coach: Olena Anatolyana
- Choreographer: Olena Zhuykova
- Music: 2011–2012: Leelos Tune by Maksim Mrvica
- Retired: 2014
Medal record
Representing Ukraine
FIG World Cup
Event	1st	2nd	3rd
Apparatus World Cup	1	1	0
Total	1	1	0

Mariya Livchikova (Ukrainian: Марія Лівчікова, born 28 April 1995) is a Ukrainian former artistic gymnast.

== Personal life ==
Livchikova was born on 28 April 1995 in Horlivka. She started gymnastics when she was seven years old. Her mother, Oksana Viktorovna, is a former figure skater.

== Gymnastics career ==
=== 2011 ===
Livchikova made her senior debut at the Cottbus World Cup. However, she did not qualify for any of the event finals. She then went to the Ghent World Cup where she won a silver medal on the balance beam behind Chinese gymnast Wu Liufang and a gold medal on the floor exercise. At the European Championships, she scored a 12.700 on the vault, 11.150 on the balance beam, and 13.600 on the floor exercise during the qualification round. She did not qualify for any event finals.

At the World Championships, Livchikova tore her ACL during podium training, and it prevented her from competing for the remainder of the season. The Ukrainian team finished nineteenth in the qualification round with a total score of 204.229. This meant that Ukraine did not qualify for the London Test Event, and they could only send one female gymnast to the 2012 Olympics.

=== 2012 ===
At the Ukrainian Cup, Livchikova didn't perform her most difficult routines, but she still finished second in the all-around with a score of 55.500. She won the bronze medal in the all-around at the Stella Zakharova Cup. Then at the European Championships, she contributed an all-around score of 52.999 in the qualification round towards Ukraine's tenth place finish. She qualified in seventh place for the floor exercise event final with a score of 14.000. She finished sixth in the floor final with a score of 13.466. Ukraine's single spot for the 2012 Olympics was given to Natalia Kononenko.

At the Brno Grand Prix, Livchikova scored a 15.250 on the balance beam and won the mixed-pairs competition with Maxim Semiankiv.

=== 2013 ===
At the WOGA Classic, Livchikova placed second in the all-around and third on beam and floor. She suffered another torn ACL and could not compete at the European Championship. Although she had resumed training, she was not ready for the World Championships and did not compete.

=== 2014 ===
During training in August 2014, Livchikova tore her ACL for a third time and had another surgery. This injury took her out of the World Championships.

==== Retirement ====
On 21 October 2014, Livchikova announced her retirement from gymnastics, citing the injuries she had sustained throughout her career as the reason.

== Competitive history ==
Competitive history of Mariya Livchikova
Year	Event	Team	AA	VT	UB	BB	FX
2011	Ghent World Cup					2nd place, silver medalist(s)	1st place, gold medalist(s)
2012	Ukraine Cup		2nd place, silver medalist(s)				
2012	Stella Zakharova Cup		3rd place, bronze medalist(s)				
2012	European Championships	10					6
2012	Brno Grand Prix	1st place, gold medalist(s)					
2013	WOGA Classic	4	2nd place, silver medalist(s)	5	6	3rd place, bronze medalist(s)	3rd place, bronze medalist(s)
