= Ashleigh Brennan =

Australian artistic gymnast

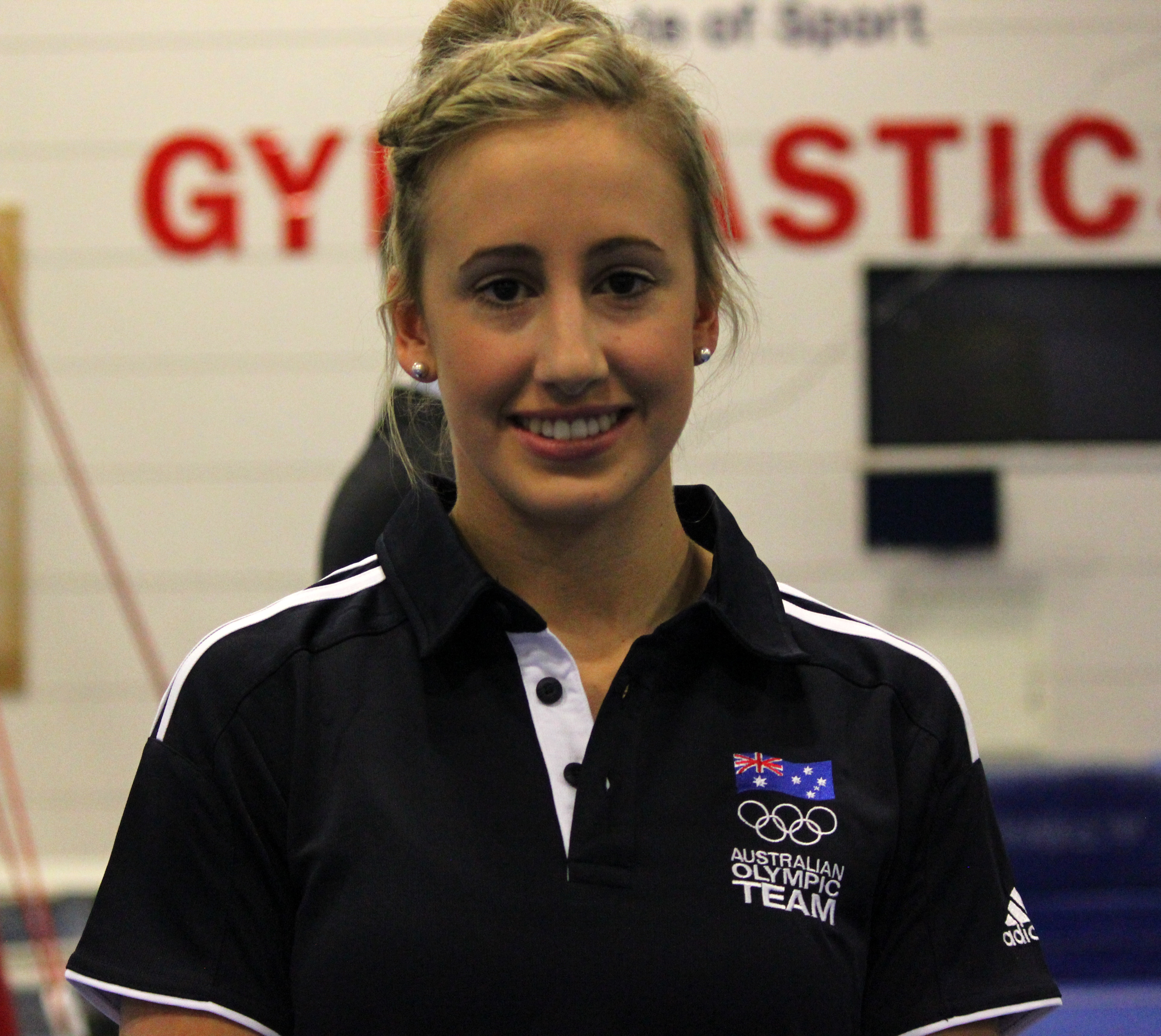
- Brennan before the 2012 Summer Olympics

Personal information
- Full name: Ashleigh Jade Brennan
- Born: 18 January 1991 (age 35) Melbourne, Victoria
- Height: 157 cm (5 ft 2 in)

Gymnastics career
- Discipline: Women's artistic gymnastics
- Country represented: Australia
Medal record
Representing Australia
Artistic Gymnastics World Cup
Silver medal – second place	2011 Doha	Balance Beam
Silver medal – second place	2011 Doha	Floor Exercise
Silver medal – second place	2012 Doha	Balance Beam
Commonwealth Games
Gold medal – first place	2006 Melbourne	Team
Gold medal – first place	2010 Delhi	Team
Silver medal – second place	2006 Melbourne	Floor Exercise
Bronze medal – third place	2010 Delhi	Floor Exercise

Ashleigh Jade Brennan (born 18 January 1991) is an Australian former gymnast who was on the Australia Gymnastics Artistic Women's National Team. She participated in the 2008 Summer Olympics, finishing sixth in the team event. She won a pair of team gold medals in the Commonwealth Games at the 2006 and 2010 Games. She won a silver medal at the Commonwealth Games in 2006 and a bronze in 2010. She was selected to represent Australia at the 2012 Summer Olympics. She is also the sister of star Berwick footballer, Tom Brennan.

== Personal ==
Brennan was born on 18 January 1991 in Melbourne, Victoria, and considers Berwick, Victoria, her hometown. She was nominated for a Victorian Institute of Sport (VIS) Spirit Award.

== Gymnastics career ==
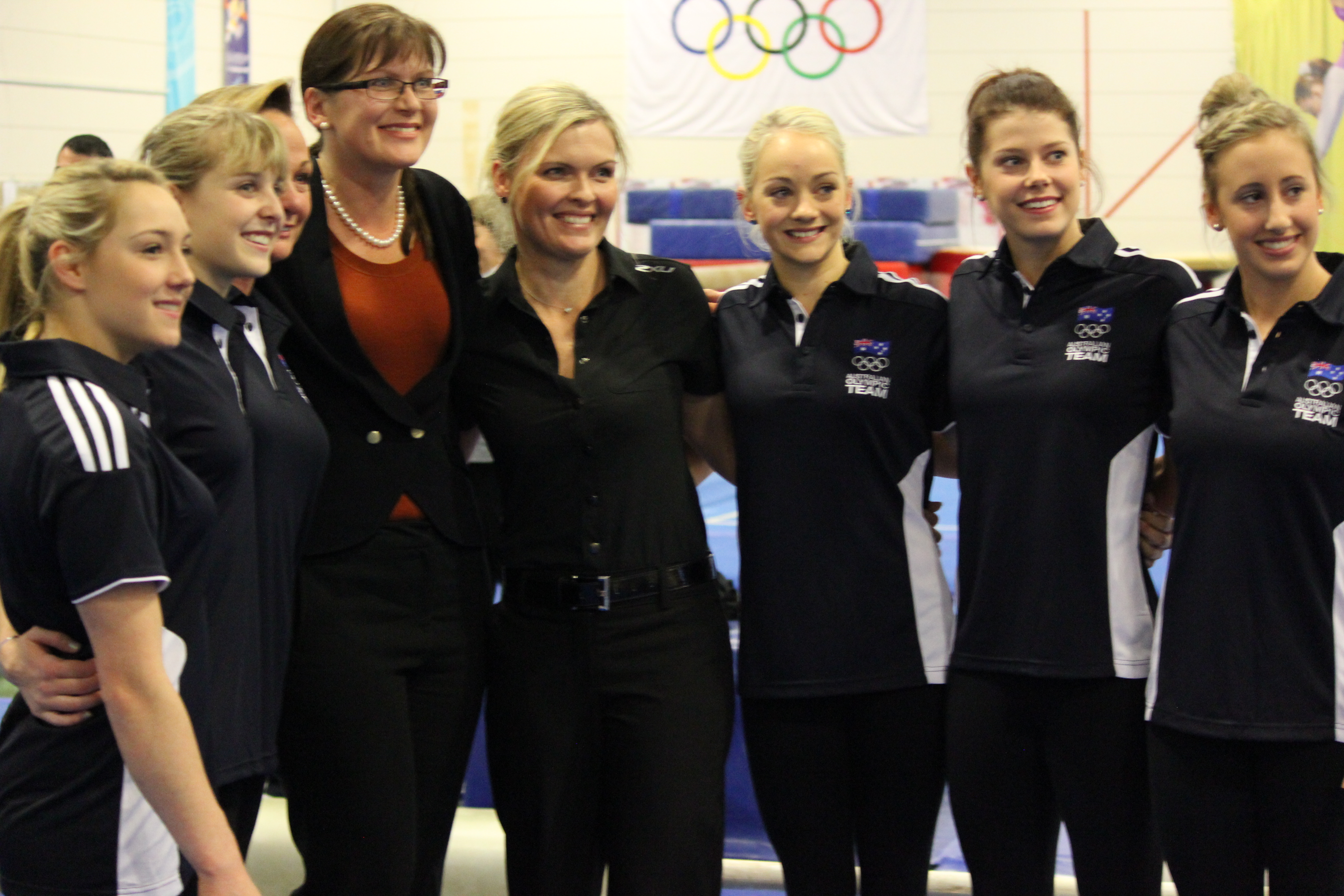
Brennan (far-right) with Kate Lundy and Australian Olympic teammates

Brennan is an all-around specialist who got started when she was seven. Before practice and competitions, she drinks coffee.

Brennan made her senior Australian National Championship debut in 2007, having missed 2004, 2005 and 2006 because of injury. At the 2007 national championships, she finished third in the floor, fourth in the balance beam, eighth in the all around, 12th in the uneven bars, and sixteenth in the vault. In 2008, she finished second on the floor, third in the balance beam, uneven bars, and all around event. She did not compete in 2009. In 2011, she finished second in the floor and balance beam, and fifth in the vault and all around. In 2012, she finished first in the all around, third in the balance beam and floor, sixth in the uneven bars and eighth in the vault.

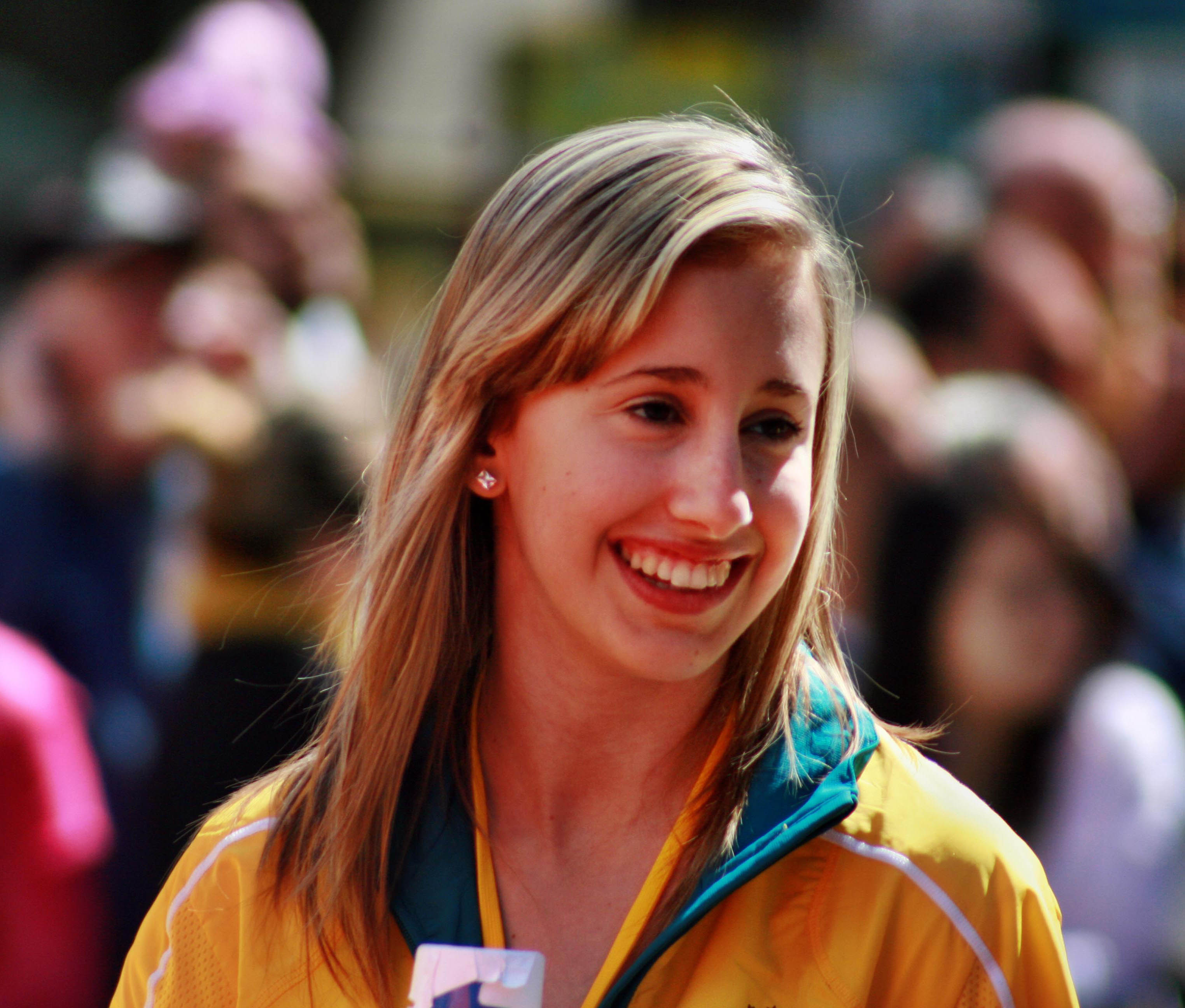
Ashleigh Brennan after the 2008 Summer Olympics

Brennan has represented Australia in several competitions, including the 2006 Commonwealth Games and 2010 Commonwealth Games, the 2007, 2010 and 2011 World Championships, and the 2008 Summer Olympics and the 2012 Summer Olympics. At the 2006 and 2010 Commonwealth Games, she earned a gold in the team event. She earned a silver in the floor in 2006 and a bronze in the floor in 2010. At the 2008 Summer Olympics, she finished sixth in the team event.

She has placed in several other competitions. At the 2011 Doha World Cup, she finished second in the balance beam and floor. At the 2012 Gymnix International, she finished second in the floor, third in the all around and balance beam, eighth in the vault and tied for seventeenth in the uneven bars. At the 2012 Doha World Cup, she finished second in the balance beam and fifth on the floor.

As a member of the 2012 Australian senior squad, Brennan was coached by Peggy Liddick. At the 2012 Australian Gymnastics Championships in Sydney, she won the all around event. She earned a bronze medal in the floor and balance beam events. The event was part of the Australian national team Olympic qualifying process.

=== 2012 Summer Olympics ===
Brennan performing on floor at the 2012 Australian Gymnastics Championships

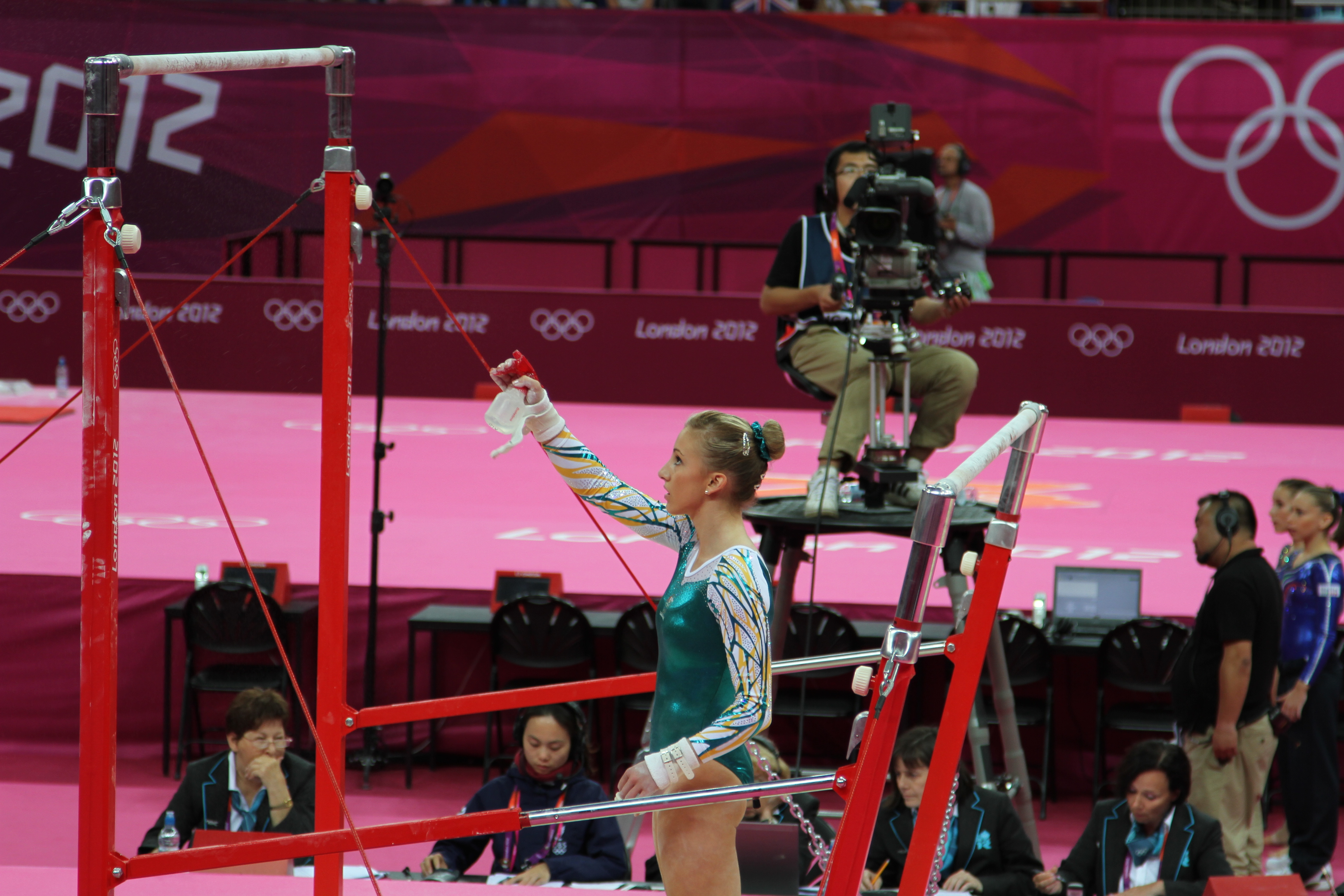
Brennan about to compete on the uneven bars at London 2012 on 29 July

Brennan was part of the 2012 Olympic Qualifying team that finished sixth. In June 2012, she was one of twelve Australian gymnasts vying to earn a final spot on the Olympic squad at a training session for the national team at the Australian Institute of Sport. At the same time, she was one of three Australian female gymnasts who were confirmed to be going to the Games alongside Lauren Mitchell and Emily Little. She represented Australia at the 2012 Summer Olympics in women's artistic gymnastics, and was selected to compete in the women's team event. Her Olympic training preparations included learning how to deal with flash photography with strobe lighting used at practice and being exposed to distracting noises.

Brennan qualified in 28th place for the individual all-around final with a score of 54.232 on 29 July, contributing to the Australian team's tenth-place finish during qualification. In the all-around final on 2 August, she placed 20th with a score of 55.332.

Brennan retired from gymnastics in November 2012 to pursue a career in sports science.
