= 2012 Asian Artistic Gymnastics Championships =

International gymnastics competition

- Host city: Putian, China
- Dates: 11–14 November 2012
- Main venue: Putian Complex Sports Gymnasium

The 2012 Asian Artistic Gymnastics Championships were the 5th edition of the Asian Artistic Gymnastics Championships, and were held in Putian, China from November 11 to November 14, 2012.

== Medal summary ==
=== Men ===
Event	Gold	Silver	Bronze
Team	China; Zhou Shixiong; Lin Chaopan; Ji Lianshen; Liu Rongbing; Cheng Ran; Yang Shengchao	Japan; Minori Koyama; Yoshiaki Furutani; Takayuki Ohara; Yu Suzuki; Rikii Hoshino; Kenzō Shirai	North Korea; Ri Se-gwang; Kim Jin-hyok; Ro Chol-jin; Kim Kwang-chun; Ri Chol-jin; Kim Kyong-hak
Individual all-around	Liu Rongbing; China	Zhou Shixiong; China	Ko Ye-darm; South Korea
Floor	Kenzō Shirai; Japan	Kim Han-sol; South Korea	Lee Jun-ho; South Korea
Pommel horse	Liu Rongbing; China	Ji Lianshen; China	Shared silver
Pommel horse	Liu Rongbing; China	Yoshiaki Furutani; Japan	Shared silver
Rings	Ri Se-gwang; North Korea	Yang Shengchao; China	Ng Kiu Chung; Hong Kong
Rings	Ri Se-gwang; North Korea	Yang Shengchao; China	Chen Chih-yu; Chinese Taipei
Vault	Ri Se-gwang; North Korea	Cheng Ran; China	Nguyễn Hà Thanh; Vietnam
Parallel bars	Zhou Shixiong; China	Nguyễn Hà Thanh; Vietnam	Ji Lianshen; China
Horizontal bar	Liu Rongbing; China	Lin Chaopan; China	Yoshiaki Furutani; Japan
Horizontal bar	Liu Rongbing; China	Lin Chaopan; China	Takayuki Ohara; Japan

=== Women ===
Event	Gold	Silver	Bronze
Team	China; Wu Liufang; Luo Peiru; Li Yiting; Zeng Siqi; Huang Huidan; Shang Chunsong	North Korea; Hong Un-jong; Kim Un-hyang; Kang Yong-mi; Ri Un-ha; Pak Sin-hyang; Kim So-yong	Japan; Mirai Sekiguchi; Shizuka Tozawa; Erica Lynn Danko; Sakura Noda; Risa Konishi; Wakana Inoue
Individual all-around	Zeng Siqi; China	Sung Ji-hye; South Korea	Shang Chunsong; China
Vault	Phan Thị Hà Thanh; Vietnam	Hong Un-jong; North Korea	Ri Un-ha; North Korea
Uneven bars	Wu Liufang; China	Huang Huidan; China	Sung Ji-hye; South Korea
Balance beam	Shang Chunsong; China	Kim Un-hyang; North Korea	Zeng Siqi; China
Floor	Shang Chunsong; China	Risa Konishi; Japan	Zeng Siqi; China

== Medal table ==
Rank	Nation	Gold	Silver	Bronze	Total
1	China	10	6	4	20
2	North Korea	2	3	2	7
3	Japan	1	3	3	7
4	Vietnam	1	1	1	3
5	South Korea	0	2	3	5
6	Chinese Taipei	0	0	1	1
6	Hong Kong	0	0	1	1
Totals (7 entries)		14	15	15	44

== Participating nations ==
100 athletes from 17 nations competed.

- China (12)
- Chinese Taipei (8)
- Hong Kong (8)
- Iran (6)
- Japan (12)
- Kazakhstan (7)
- Kuwait (3)
- Malaysia (1)
- Mongolia (1)
- North Korea (12)
- Qatar (3)
- Singapore (1)
- South Korea (11)
- Sri Lanka (1)
- Thailand (3)
- Uzbekistan (3)
- Vietnam (8)
