= Zeng Siqi =

Chinese artistic gymnast

- Full name: 曾斯琪 (Zeng Siqi)
- Born: 5 February 1996 (age 30)

Gymnastics career
- Discipline: Women's artistic gymnastics
- Country represented: China
- Head coaches: Liu Guicheng, He Hua
- Former coach: Ling Jie
Medal record
Representing China
Asian Championships
| Gold medal – first place | 2012 Putian | Team |
| Gold medal – first place | 2012 Putian | All-Around |
| Bronze medal – third place | 2012 Putian | Balance Beam |
| Bronze medal – third place | 2012 Putian | Floor Exercise |
Pacific Rim Championships
| Silver medal – second place | 2010 Melbourne | Team |

Zeng Siqi (Chinese: 曾斯琪; pinyin: Zēng Sīqí) is a Chinese artistic gymnast. She is a member of the Chinese National team and represents the Hunan province. She's coached by former World Champion and Olympic silver medalist Ling Jie. Her best events are balance beam and floor exercise.

== Junior career ==
Zeng was named to the Chinese team for the 2010 Pacific Rim Championships, where she won a team silver medal and a bronze medal on uneven bars in the junior division. At the Chinese Nationals, she won bronze on balance beam and placed fourth on floor exercise.

The following year, she placed third in the all-around at both the National Championships and the Sakura Cup.

== Senior career ==
Zeng made her senior debut at the Chinese Nationals, where she won floor exercise and placed second on balance beam. She competed at the Doha Cup in early 2013 and won silver on balance beam and bronze on floor exercise. In May she placed third at the Chinese National Championships. Zeng was selected as a member of the Chinese team for the World Championships in Antwerp, Belgium. She competed on balance beam in the qualifications round but unfortunately she did not make the final due to a fall on one of her elements.
