= Xie Yufen =

Chinese artistic gymnast

- Full name: 谢玉芬 (Xie Yufen)
- Born: 24 November 1998 (age 27)

Gymnastics career
- Discipline: Women's artistic gymnastics
- Country represented: China
- Head coaches: Li Zheng (李政), Sun Haiou (孙海欧)
Medal record
Representing China
World Championships
Silver medal – second place	2014 Nanning	Team
Pacific Rim Championships
Silver medal – second place	2014 Richmond	Balance Beam
Bronze medal – third place	2014 Richmond	Team
Asian Championships
Silver medal – second place	2015 Hiroshima	Team

Xie Yufen (Chinese: 谢玉芬) is a Chinese artistic gymnast.

== 2014 ==
At the Pacific Rim Championships, she won the silver medal on the balance beam.

== 2015 ==
In 2015, Yufen won the WOGA Classic.

== Competitive history ==
Year	Event	Team	AA	VT	UB	BB	FX
2013	National Championships	3rd					
2013	National Games	3rd					
2014	WOGA Classic	3rd	2nd				
2014	Pacific Rim Championships	3rd	4th		4th	2nd	
2014	National Championships	3rd	7th		5th		
2014	World Championships	2nd					
2014	Individual National Championships				7th	3rd	
2015	WOGA Classic		1st				
2015	National Championships	1st	12th		4th		
2015	Asian Championships	2nd					
