= Peggy Liddick =

- Born: 17 June 1957 (age 69); Omaha, Nebraska
- Citizenship: Australian
- Occupation: Gymnastics coach
- Known for: Coach of Shannon Miller and former head coach of Gymnastics Australia

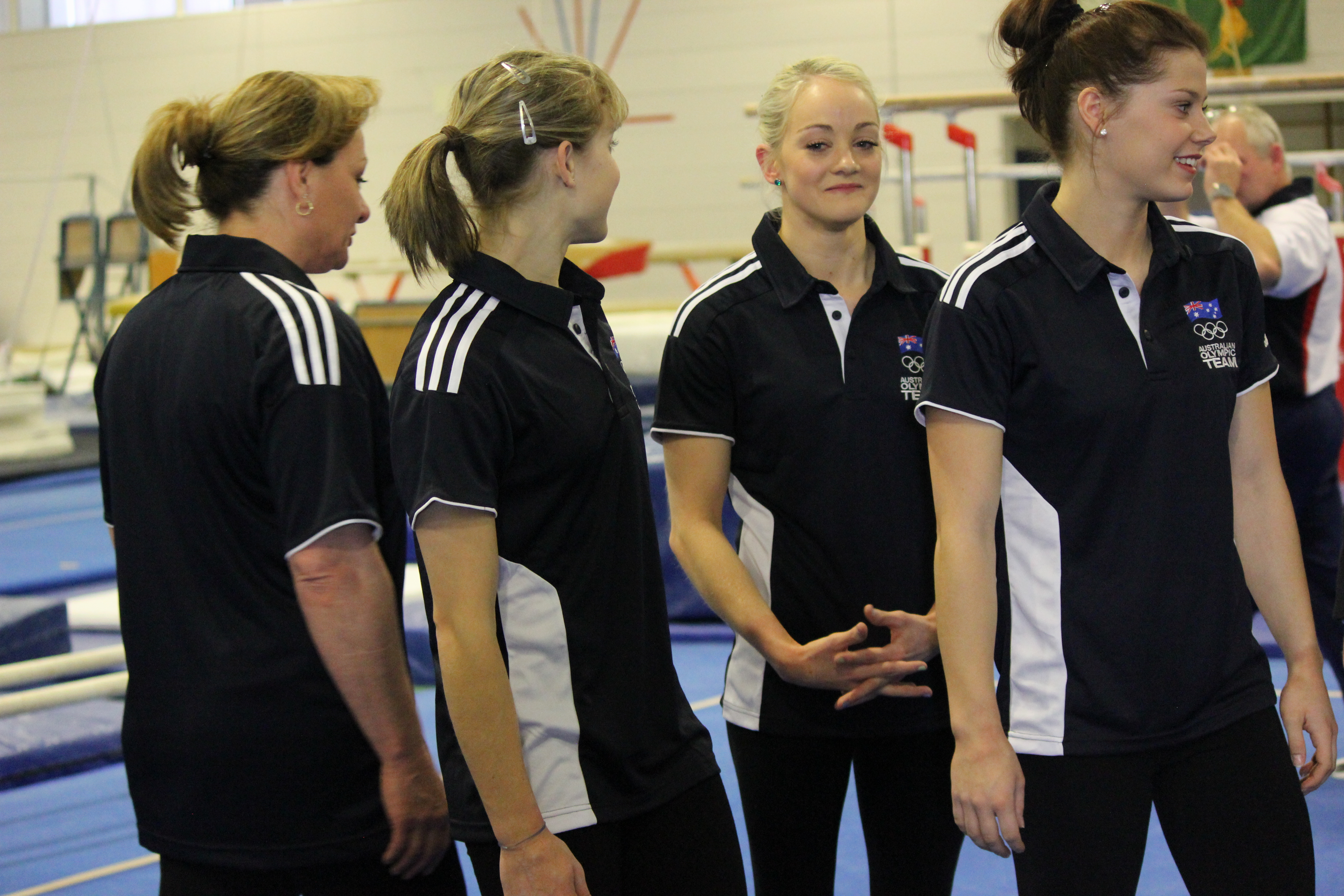
From left to right: Liddick, Lauren Mitchell, Larrissa Miller, Georgia Bonora

Peggy Liddick (born 17 June 1957 in Omaha, Nebraska, United States) is an American-born Australian women's gymnastics coach. She was one of the personal coaches for Shannon Miller, who won seven Olympic medals and nine World Championship medals. At the end of 2016 she stepped down as national coach of Gymnastics Australia.

From 1976 to 1979, Liddick was a member of Nebraska Cornhuskers women's gymnastics team and later served as an assistant coach the following season. After the 1996 Olympics, Liddick moved to Australia and in 1997 took up the position of National Coach, Women's Gymnastics, for Gymnastics Australia. Since taking up the position Peggy Liddick has coached the Australian team at the 2005 World Championships where Monette Russo won the first Australian women’s World Championships All Around medal, coming third in her event.

Liddick was also the coach of the Australian team at 2010 World Championships which saw Lauren Mitchell win the first Australian women’s World Championships Gold medal for her floor routine.

She is a Federation of International Gymnastics (FIG) brevet accredited coach and judge and in 2012 was inducted into the Gymnastics Australia Hall of Fame.

Liddick's name was later removed from the Gymnastics Australia Hall of Fame

Liddick was granted Australian citizenship in January 2012.

On 19 January 2022 Liddick's Gymnastics Australia Technical Membership was suspended for four months (wholly suspended for two years). She was found guilty of two breaches of the Gymnastics Australia Member Protection Policy as the result of a number of complaints by previous gymnasts.
