= Vasiliki Millousi =

Greek artistic gymnast

Vasiliki Millousi Βασιλική Μιλλούση
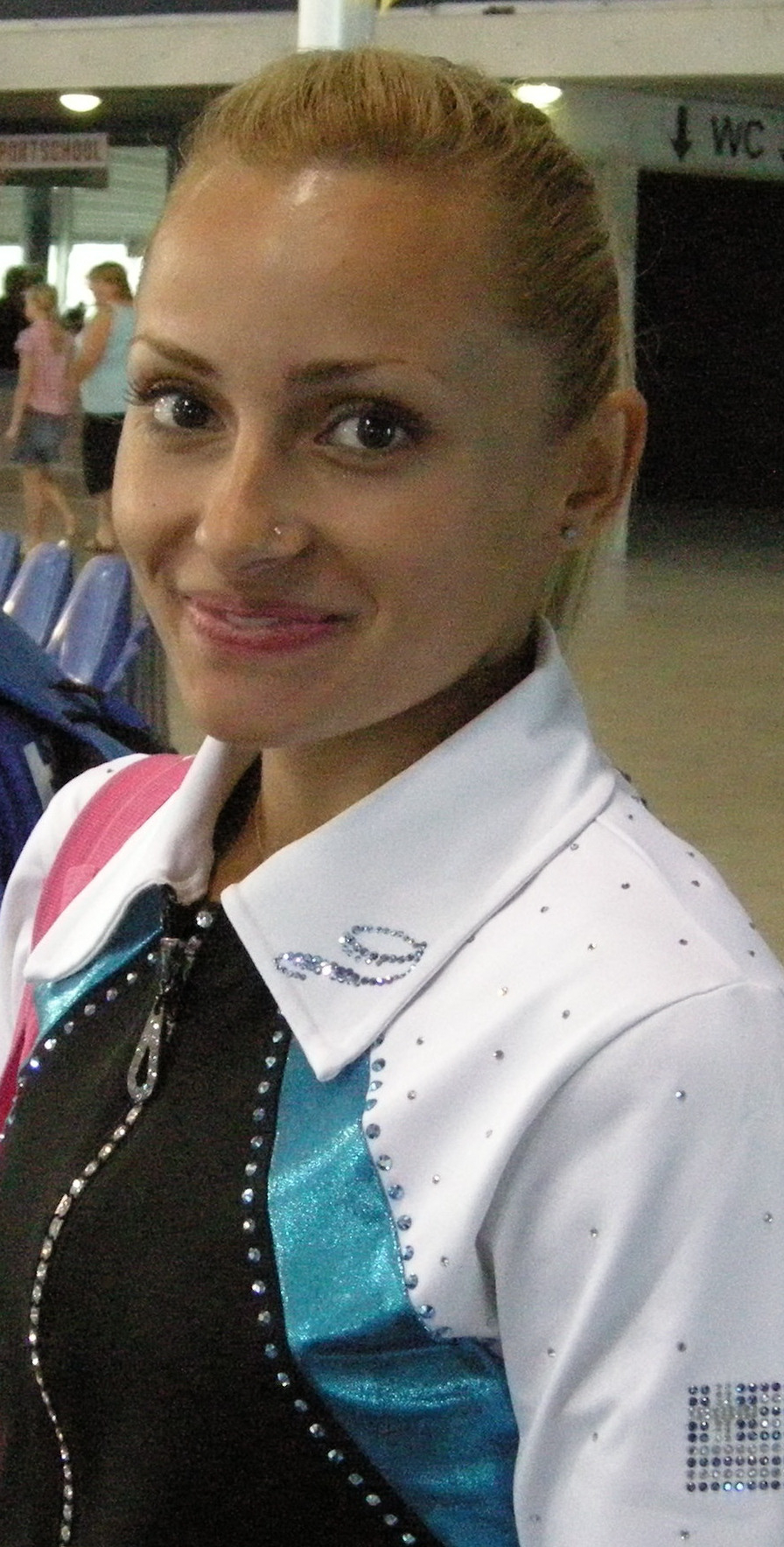

Personal information
- Born: 4 May 1984 (age 42) Athens, Greece
- Height: 157 cm (5 ft 2 in)
- Spouse: Eleftherios Petrounias (m. 2019)

Gymnastics career
- Discipline: Women's artistic gymnastics
- Country represented: Greece
- Head coach: Kostas Hagizizis
- Former coach: Sioutis Konstadinos
- Choreographer: Donti Anastasia
- Awards: Shooting Star Award (2023)
Medal record
Representing Greece
European Team Championships
Bronze medal – third place	1999 Patras	Team
Mediterranean Games
Gold medal – first place	2009 Pescara	Balance beam
Silver medal – second place	2013 Mersin	Balance beam
Bronze medal – third place	2009 Pescara	Team
Bronze medal – third place	2013 Mersin	Team
FIG World Cup
Event	1st	2nd	3rd
World Cup	2	2	4
World Challenge Cup	2	2	2
Total	4	4	6

Vasiliki Millousi (Greek: Βασιλική Μιλλούση, IPA: [vasiliˈci miˈlusi]; born 4 May 1984) is a Greek artistic gymnast. She is a ten-time World Cup Series medalist on beam and has represented Greece at the 2000, 2012, and 2016 Olympic Games. She occasionally competes in the all-around but specializes in the balance beam. More recently, she was a beam finalist at the 2011 European Artistic Gymnastics Championships. She also won the beam final at the 2012 Artistics Gymnastics Olympic Test Event which qualified her for the Olympics 2012 in London.

== Senior career ==
=== 2012 Summer Olympics ===
During the 2012 London Olympic Games, Millousi competed all-around in qualifications scoring a 12.800 on vault, 13.425 on the uneven bars, 14.366 on balance beam and a 12.933 on floor exercise for a 53.524 all-around score. She failed to qualify for any finals, however, her very respectable 14.366 on beam placed her 18th on the event and due to the two per country rule made her the 4th reserve for the beam final.

=== 2013-2014 ===
In 2013, Vasiliki competed at the Cottbus World Cup and won the silver medal on beam (her fourth beam medal in four consecutive Cottbus World Cups). She also competed at the Mediterranean Games in Mersin, winning a bronze medal in the team competition and a silver medal on beam giving her a total of four Mediterranean Games medals. Millousi also competed at the European Championships in Moscow where she chose to specialize on beam. She did not make the finals however, after a fall on beam meant she scored only 12.666. Millousi then went on to compete at the 2013 Antwerp World Championships. In the competition, Millousi performed well on vault and floor however, a mistake on beam and multiple errors on bars caused her to finish in 24th place with an all-around score of 49.532 (almost three points lower than her qualification score of 53.033).

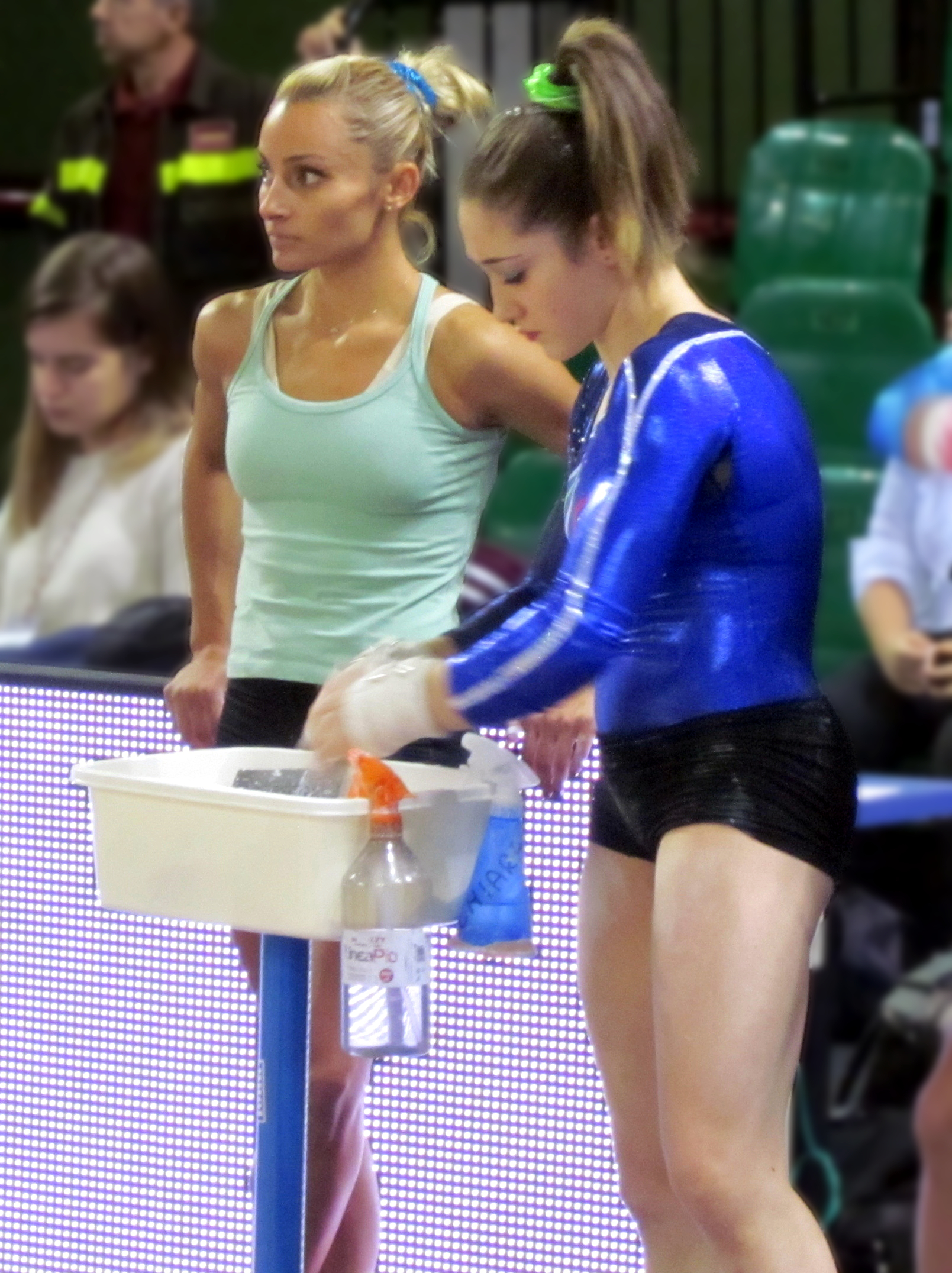
Millousi & Italian Alessia Leolini in 2013

In 2014, Millousi began her season competing again at the Cottbus World Cup, though failed to make any of the event finals after errors on bars and beam in qualifications. Next, Millousi went to help out the Union Haguenau team at the French Championships Team Final by competing on bars, beam and floor. After two unsuccessful competitions, Millousi competed at the Korea Cup where she rearranged her beam routine. She won the gold medal on beam with 14.325. At the 2014 Nanning World Championships, Millousi rearranged her beam routine and in qualifications, had a strong performance scoring a 53.933 all-around - just missing out on the all-around final by 0.309.

=== 2015–2016 ===
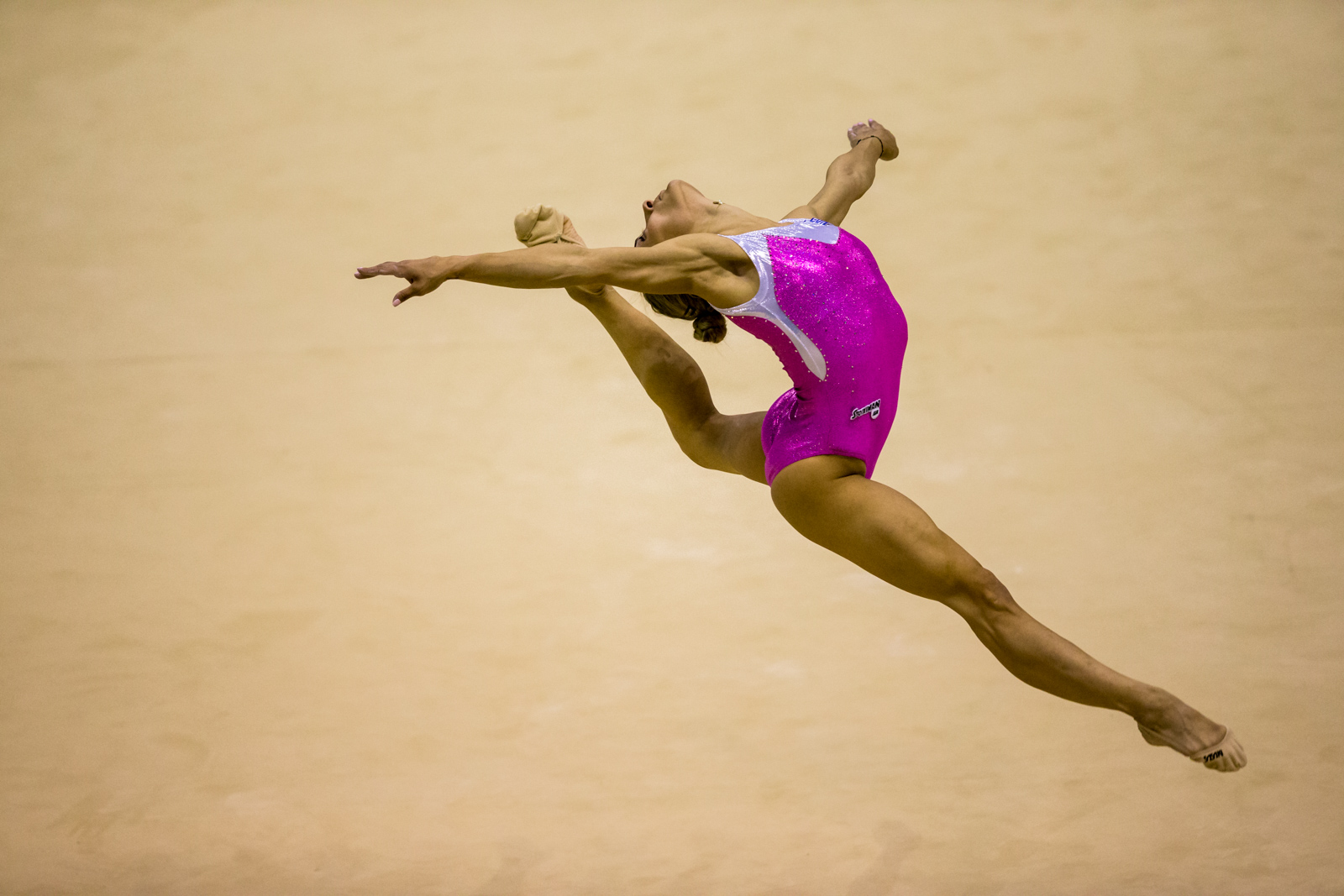
Millousi at the 2016 Olympic Test Event

Millousi began the 2015 season by once again competing at the Cottbus World Cup. She did not make the beam final after only scoring a 12.466 in qualifications after an error. At the European Championships in Montpellier, Millousi made an error on the uneven bars and did not qualify to the final. After her disappointing European Championships, Millousi competed at the Baku European Games where she qualified to the all-around final. Next Millousi competed at the Hungarian Grand Prix, winning the gold medal on beam and the bronze medal on floor. Millousi ended her season with a disappointing performance at the World Championships in Glasgow performing on three events.

In 2016, Millousi first competed at the Doha World Challenge Cup where she qualified to both the beam and bar finals. Millousi was 5th in the bar final and was on track to win another World Cup medal on beam until she crashed her double pike dismount to finish in sixth place. In order to qualify for the Olympic Games, Millousi went to compete at the Olympic Test Event in Rio, performing well and scoring a 54.431, allowing her to qualify for the Olympic Games in Rio. Millousi then went on to compete at the Greek Championships winning the beam and floor titles with a 14.500 and a 13.650, respectively. At the Bern European Championships, Millousi submitted a new skill to the judges - a switch split leap in a stag ring position.

=== 2016 Summer Olympics ===
She competed on the balance beam at the 2016 Summer Olympics where she wisely decided to change her double pike dismount to a gainer layout dismount. She finished in 57th place in qualifying after falling on her aerial cartwheel and did not advance to the finals.

=== 2017 ===
Millousi competed at the Greek Championships in March where she placed third on uneven bars and second on balance beam. She later competed at the Baku World Cup where she won the silver medal on balance beam behind 2004 Olympic Champion Cătălina Ponor. In April she competed at the European Championships but failed to qualify for any event finals.

=== 2018 ===
In June Millousi competed at the 2018 Mediterranean Games where she helped the Greek team place seventh and individually she placed fifth in the balance beam final. In August she competed at the European Championships. She qualified for the balance beam final and finished in eighth place. In October Millousi competed at the World Championships. During qualifications she placed 32nd on balance beam and did not qualify to the event finals. She announced her retirement shortly after, officially retiring on October 30, 2018.

=== 2023 ===
Millousi competed on balance beam and uneven bars at the 2023 European Artistic Gymnastics Championships in Antalya, Turkey.

== Personal life ==
Millousi has been married to fellow Greek gymnast Eleftherios Petrounias since 2019. They have two daughters, Sofia and Eleni.

== World Cup Series ==
Stage	Year	Event	Result
Cottbus	2010	Balance Beam	1st place, gold medalist(s)
Maribor	2011	Balance Beam	1st place, gold medalist(s)
Cottbus	2012	Balance Beam	1st place, gold medalist(s)
Osijek	2012	Balance Beam	2nd place, silver medalist(s)
Cottbus	2013	Balance Beam	2nd place, silver medalist(s)
Doha	2009	Balance Beam	3rd place, bronze medalist(s)
Stuttgart	2011	Balance Beam	3rd place, bronze medalist(s)
Cottbus	2011	Balance Beam	3rd place, bronze medalist(s)
Ghent	2012	Balance Beam	3rd place, bronze medalist(s)
Baku	2017	Balance Beam	2nd place, silver medalist(s)

== Competitive history ==
Year	Event	Team	AA	VT	UB	BB	FX
1999	Open Belorussian Championships		18				
1999	European Team Masters	3rd place, bronze medalist(s)					
2000	Cottbus International				18	26	
2000	European Championships		31				
2000	Olympic Games		55				
2001	Mediterranean Games	4			8	4	
2002
2002	European Championships		13				
2002	World Championships					14	
2003	NoyNoy Grand Prix					6	
2006
2006	World Championships		76				
2007	Moscow News/World Stars					5	
2007	European Championships				28	16	
2007	World Championships	19					
2008	Doha World Cup				8		
2008	European Championships	9					
2009	Mediterranean Games	3rd place, bronze medalist(s)	6		1st place, gold medalist(s)		
2009	Doha World Cup					3rd place, bronze medalist(s)	
2009	Greek Championships		1st place, gold medalist(s)				
2009	European Championships					7	
2009	World Championships					13	
2010	Cottbus World Cup				8	3rd place, bronze medalist(s)	
2010	Paris World Cup				7	3rd place, bronze medalist(s)	
2010	European Championships	15				13	
2010	Ostrava World Cup				1st place, gold medalist(s)	1st place, gold medalist(s)	2nd place, silver medalist(s)
2010	Greek Championships		1st place, gold medalist(s)				
2010	World Championships	19	41				
2011	Cottbus World Cup					3rd place, bronze medalist(s)	
2011	Glasgow World Cup		7				
2011	European Championships		15			6	
2011	Maribor World Cup					1st place, gold medalist(s)	
2011	World Championships	24				R1	
2012	Olympic Test Event					1st place, gold medalist(s)	
2012	Cottbus World Cup					1st place, gold medalist(s)	
2012	Osijek World Cup					2nd place, silver medalist(s)	
2012	European Championships					7	
2012	Ghent World Cup					3rd place, bronze medalist(s)	
2012	Olympic Games		34			18	
2013	La Roche-sur-Yon World Cup					3rd place, bronze medalist(s)	
2013	Cottbus Challenge Cup					2nd place, silver medalist(s)	
2013	European Championships					22	
2013	Ljubljana Challenge Cup					4	
2013	Mediterranean Games	3rd place, bronze medalist(s)				2nd place, silver medalist(s)	
2013	Osijek Challenge Cup					7	
2013	World Championships		24				
2014	Korea Cup					1st place, gold medalist(s)	
2014	Cottbus Challenge Cup				19	15	
2014	European Championships	21					
2014	Greek Championships		1st place, gold medalist(s)				
2014	World Championships	24	R1			R3	
2015
2015	European Championships					5	
2015	European Games	16	16				
2015	Szombathely Challenge Cup					1st place, gold medalist(s)	3rd place, bronze medalist(s)
2015	World Championships	24					
2016	Doha Challenge Cup				5	6	
2016	Olympic Test Event		13				
2016	European Championships	15					
2016	Olympic Games					57	
2017	Baku World Cup					2nd place, silver medalist(s)	
2017	European Championships					19	
2018	Mediterranean Games	7				5	
2018	European Championships					8	
2018	World Championships	26					
