= Larrissa Miller =

Australian artistic gymnast

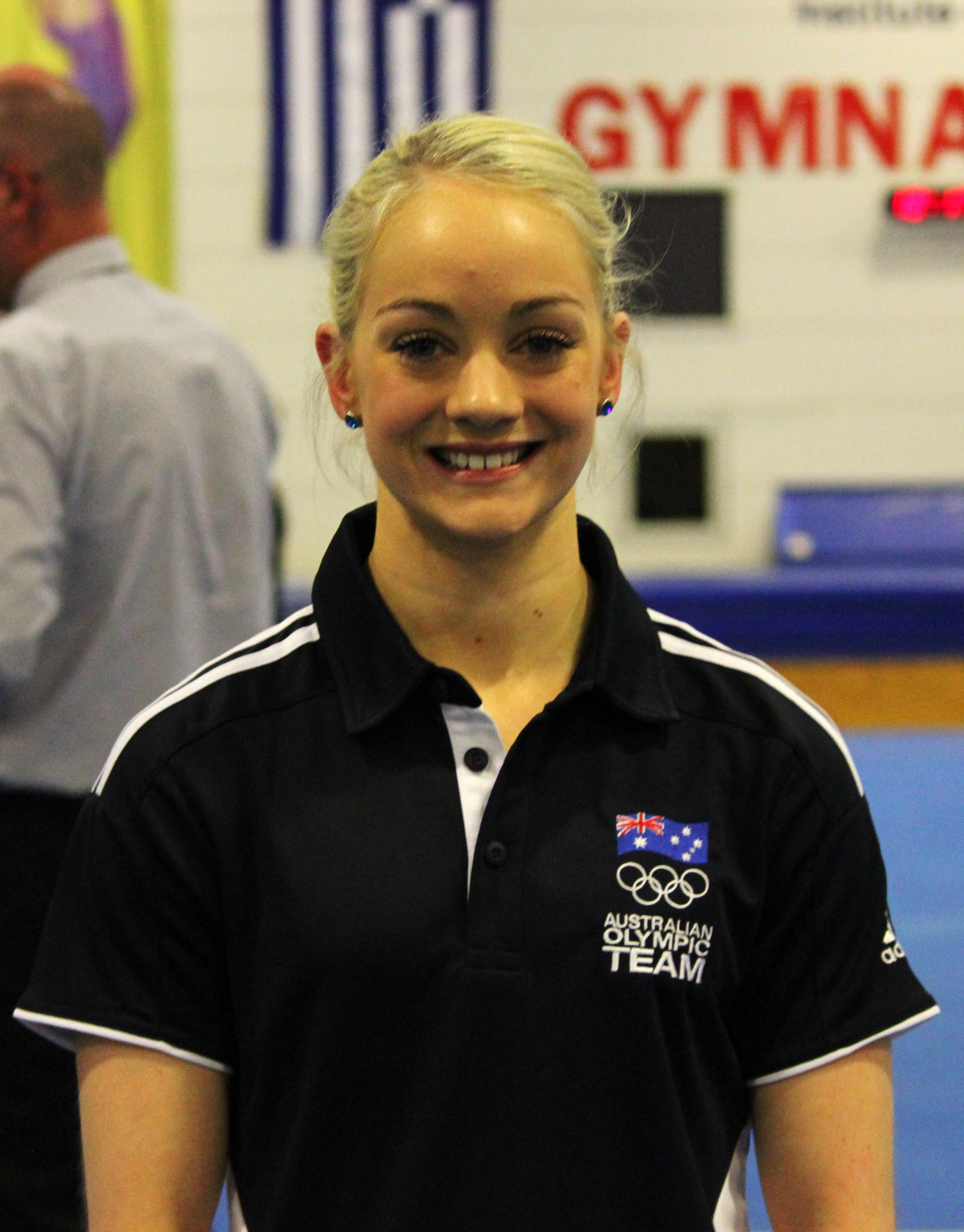
- Miller before the 2012 Summer Olympics.

Personal information
- Full name: Larrissa Grace Miller
- Alternative name: Larrissa Miller
- Born: 12 July 1992 (age 34) Moranbah, Queensland
- Height: 160 cm (5 ft 3 in)

Gymnastics career
- Discipline: Women's artistic gymnastics
- Country represented: Australia; (2009–present)
- Club: Waverley Gymnastics Centre/Moranbah Gymnastics Club
- Head coach: John Hart
- Former coaches: Vladimir and Irina Joura
- Choreographer: Beth Rybacki Lisa Bradley
Medal record
Representing Australia
Commonwealth Games
Silver medal – second place	2014 Glasgow	Team
Silver medal – second place	2014 Glasgow	Uneven bars
World Cup Series
Silver medal – second place	2011 Doha	Uneven bars
Bronze medal – third place	2012 Zibo	Uneven bars
Pacific Rim Championships
Silver medal – second place	2016 Everett	Uneven bars
Bronze medal – third place	2010 Melbourne	Team
Bronze medal – third place	2016 Everett	Team

Larrissa Miller (born 12 July 1992) is an artistic gymnast who represented Australia at the 2012 and 2016 Summer Olympics. She made her Australian Senior National Championship debut in 2008, and went on to compete at the World Artistic Gymnastics Championships in 2009, 2010 and 2011. She also performed at the 2014 Commonwealth Games and the 2014 World Championships.

== Early life ==
Miller was born on 12 July 1992 in Moranbah, Australia. She started gymnastics when she was five years old at Moranbah Gymnastics Club, where she was coached by Julie Hands. When she was seven, she moved to Brisbane to train at the Queensland Academy of Sport with Vladimir and Irina Joura.

In 2015, Miller revealed that she had been sexually abused by an extended family member from the ages of 5 to 16. She is an advocate and ambassador for Bravehearts, an Australian non-profit organisation focused on child sexual assault.

== Gymnastics career ==
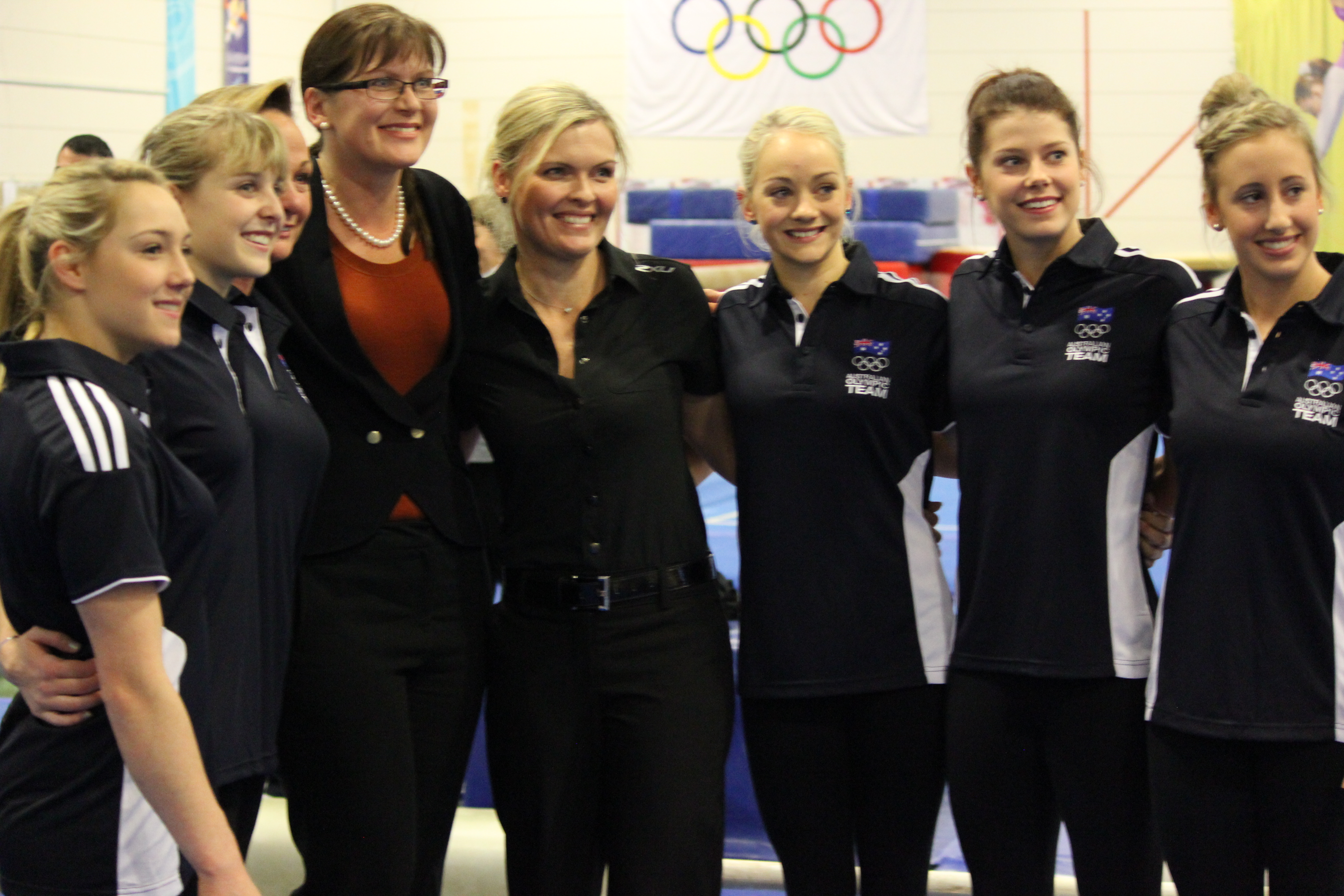
Miller (third from right) with Kate Lundy and Australian Olympic teammates.

Miller competed at her first Australian Senior National Championships in 2008 and finished 12th in the all-around. In 2009, she finished 7th overall and 2nd on the uneven bars.

At the 2009 World Championships in London, she finished 5th in the uneven bars qualification and 7th in the finals. At the 2010 Pacific Rim Championships, she finished 3rd with the Australian team, 8th on the uneven bars, and 19th in the all-around.

In June 2012, Miller was selected to represent Australia at the 2012 Summer Olympics in London. At the Olympics, she finished 29th on bars, 42nd on floor, and 10th with the Australian team.

Miller attended the 2014 Commonwealth Games in Glasgow, where she claimed a silver on uneven bars (behind British gymnast Rebecca Downie) and helped Australia earn a silver in the team competition. Later that year, she competed in the 2014 World Artistic Gymnastics Championships in Nanning, China, where she qualified for the floor final in 8th place and finished 6th.

In June 2016, Miller was announced as Australia's lone representative in the women's gymnastics competition at the 2016 Olympics.

== Outside gymnastics ==
In 2017, Miller was a contestant in the first season of Australian Ninja Warrior.
