= 2010 Pacific Rim Gymnastics Championships =

Major regional biennial gymnastics competition

- Venue: Hisense Arena
- Location: Melbourne, Australia
- Dates: April 29–May 2, 2010

The 2010 Pacific Rim Championships were held from 29 April to 2 May 2010 in Melbourne.

== Medalists ==
Event	Gold	Silver	Bronze
Team	United States; Jordyn Wieber; Rebecca Bross; Aly Raisman; Kyla Ross; Sabrina Vega; Bridget Sloan	China; Tan Sixin; Wu Liufang; Huang Qiushuang; Jiang Tong; Zeng Siqi; Zhou Qiaohong	Australia; Emily Little; Amelia McGrath; Emma Collister; Georgia Rose Brown; Georgia Wheeler; Larrissa Miller
Seniors
All-Around	Rebecca Bross (USA)	Aly Raisman (USA)	Ksenia Afanasyeva (RUS)
Vault	Dominique Pegg (CAN)	Emily Little (AUS)	Alexa Moreno (MEX)
Uneven Bars	Huang Qiushuang (CHN)	Rebecca Bross (USA)	Ksenia Afanasyeva (RUS)
Balance Beam	Rebecca Bross (USA)	Aly Raisman (USA)	Wu Liufang (CHN)
Floor	Rebecca Bross (USA)	Aly Raisman (USA)	Kristina Vaculik (CAN)
Juniors
All-Around	Jordyn Wieber (USA)	Kyla Ross (USA)	Anna Rodionova (RUS)
Vault	Kyla Ross (USA)	Jordyn Wieber (USA)	Zhou Qiaohong (CHN)
Uneven Bars	Jordyn Wieber (USA)	Kyla Ross (USA)	Zeng Siqi (CHN)
Balance Beam	Tan Sixin (CHN)	Sabrina Vega (USA)	Madeline Gardiner (CAN)
Floor	Jordyn Wieber (USA)	Kyla Ross (USA)	Amelia McGrath (AUS); Tan Sixin (CHN)

== Detailed results ==
=== Team ===
Rank	Team	Vault (gymnastics)	Uneven bars	Balance beam	Floor (gymnastics)	Total
1st place, gold medalist(s)	United States	60.750	57.950	58.700	57.550	234.950
1st place, gold medalist(s)	Jordyn Wieber	15.100	14.800	15.200	14.450	234.950
1st place, gold medalist(s)	Rebecca Bross	15.050	15.150	14.350	14.600	234.950
1st place, gold medalist(s)	Aly Raisman	15.350	13.750	14.800	14.350	234.950
1st place, gold medalist(s)	Kyla Ross	15.250	14.250	14.350	14.150	234.950
1st place, gold medalist(s)	Sabrina Vega					234.950
1st place, gold medalist(s)	Bridget Sloan					234.950
2nd place, silver medalist(s)	China	57.150	56.100	54.200	52.000	219.450
2nd place, silver medalist(s)	Tan Sixin	13.850	13.200	13.200	12.950	219.450
2nd place, silver medalist(s)	Wu Liufang		14.500	14.850	13.300	219.450
2nd place, silver medalist(s)	Huang Qiushuang	14.500	15.100		12.250	219.450
2nd place, silver medalist(s)	Jiang Tong	13.300		13.150	13.500	219.450
2nd place, silver medalist(s)	Zeng Siqi		13.300	13.000	13.200	219.450
2nd place, silver medalist(s)	Zhou Qiaohong	14.500				219.450
3rd place, bronze medalist(s)	Australia	55.250	54.350	53.300	52.550	215.450
3rd place, bronze medalist(s)	Emily Little	14.700	13.400	13.950	13.300	215.450
3rd place, bronze medalist(s)	Amelia McGrath	13.250		13.950	13.300	215.450
3rd place, bronze medalist(s)	Emma Collister	14.050		12.800	13.050	215.450
3rd place, bronze medalist(s)	Georgia Rose Brown	13.250	13.450		12.900	215.450
3rd place, bronze medalist(s)	Georgia Wheeler		13.300	12.600		215.450
3rd place, bronze medalist(s)	Larrissa Miller		14.200			215.450
4	Canada	55.650	52.200	55.150	50.800	213.600
4	Kristina Vaculik	13.800	13.100	14.300	13.700	213.600
4	Dominique Pegg	14.150	12.800	14.100	12.550	213.600
4	Madeline Gardiner	13.700	13.300	13.500	12.900	213.600
4	Sabrina Gill		12.800	13.250	11.650	213.600
4	Brittany Rogers	14.000				213.600
5	Malaysia	51.400	43.250	50.100	48.650	193.400
5	See Teng Cheong	13.400	12.600	13.150	13.150	193.400
5	Tracie Ang	11.950	11.800	13.250	11.400	193.400
5	Ing Yueh Tan	13.200	10.450	12.000	11.750	193.400
5	Farah Ann Ab Hadi	12.850	8.400	11.700	12.350	193.400
6	New Zealand	50.850	43.450	49.000	47.850	191.150
6	Briana Mitchell	12.750	11.500	12.950	11.350	191.150
6	Holly Moon	12.950	10.650	11.900	12.700	191.150
6	Jordan Rae	12.650	10.950	12.400	11.600	191.150
6	Brittany Robertson	12.500	10.350	11.750	12.200	191.150
7	Singapore	51.150	42.600	50.350	46.200	190.300
7	Heem Wei Lim	13.200	11.450	12.750	12.250	190.300
7	Xi Hui Tay	12.450	11.350	13.350	10.850	190.300
7	En Ning Foo	12.350	9.900	12.150	11.650	190.300
7	Jia Hui Tay	12.850		12.100	11.450	190.300
7	Pei Shi Giam		9.900			190.300

=== Seniors ===
==== All-around ====
Rank	Gymnast	Vault (gymnastics)	Uneven bars	Balance beam	Floor (gymnastics)	Total
1st place, gold medalist(s)	Rebecca Bross (USA)	15.050	15.150	14.350	14.600	59.150
2nd place, silver medalist(s)	Aly Raisman (USA)	15.350	13.750	14.800	14.350	58.250
3rd place, bronze medalist(s)	Ksenia Afanasyeva (RUS)	14.550	14.350	14.550	14.000	57.450
4	Wu Liufang (CHN)	12.850	14.500	14.850	13.300	55.500
5	Emily Little (AUS)	14.700	13.400	13.950	13.300	55.350
6	Kristina Vaculik (CAN)	13.800	13.100	14.300	13.700	54.900
7	Huang Qiushuang (CHN)	14.500	15.100	12.050	12.250	53.900
8	Dominique Pegg (CAN)	14.150	12.800	14.100	12.550	53.600
9	See Teng Cheong (MAS)	13.400	12.600	13.150	13.150	52.300
10	Georgia Wheeler (AUS)	13.150	13.300	12.600	12.150	51.200
11	Heem Wei Lim (SIN)	13.200	11.450	12.750	12.250	49.650
12	Yessenia Estrada (MEX)	13.250	11.250	12.450	12.600	49.550
13	Wong Hiu Ying Angel (HKG)	13.750	10.950	12.100	12.700	49.500
14	Mitzi Unda (MEX)	13.550	12.000	11.500	11.800	48.850
15	Briana Mitchell (NZL)	12.750	11.500	12.950	11.350	48.550
16	Tracie Ang (MAS)	11.950	11.800	13.250	11.400	48.400
17	Xi Hui Tay (SIN)	12.750	11.350	13.350	10.850	48.300
18	Holly Moon (NZL)	12.950	10.650	11.900	12.700	48.200
19	Pui Sze Ng (HKG)	12.550	9.750	9.100	10.550	41.950

==== Vault ====
Rank	Gymnast	D Score	E Score	Pen.	Score 1	D Score	E Score	Pen.	Score 2	Total
1st place, gold medalist(s)	Dominique Pegg (CAN)	5.3	8.825		14.125	4.6	8.975		13.575	13.850
2nd place, silver medalist(s)	Emily Little (AUS)	5.8	8.500		14.300	4.6	8.575		13.175	13.737
3rd place, bronze medalist(s)	Alexa Moreno (MEX)	5.0	8.650		13.650	5.2	8.500		13.700	13.675
4	Kristina Vaculik (CAN)	5.0	8.825		13.825	4.8	8.675	0.1	13.375	13.600
5	See Teng Cheong (MAS)	5.0	8.775		13.775	4.6	8.775		13.375	13.575
6	Hiu Ying Angel Wong (HKG)	5.2	8.425	0.1	13.525	5.0	8.575		13.575	13.550
7	Jiang Tong (CHN)	5.3	7.875		13.175	5.2	8.525	0.1	13.625	13.400
8	Georgia Wheeler (AUS)	4.4	8.625	0.1	12.925	4.6	8.950		13.550	13.237

==== Uneven bars ====
Rank	Gymnast	D Score	E Score	Pen.	Total
1st place, gold medalist(s)	Huang Qiushuang (CHN)	6.7	8.750		15.450
2nd place, silver medalist(s)	Rebecca Bross (USA)	6.2	8.500		14.700
3rd place, bronze medalist(s)	Ksenia Afanasyeva (RUS)	5.7	8.550		14.250
4	Kristina Vaculik (CAN)	5.6	8.625		14.225
5	Wu Liufang (CHN)	6.3	7.825		14.125
6	Emily Little (AUS)	5.0	8.475		13.475
7	Aly Raisman (USA)	5.2	7.825		13.025
8	Larrissa Miller (AUS)	6.1	6.450		12.550

==== Balance beam ====
Rank	Gymnast	D Score	E Score	Pen.	Total
1st place, gold medalist(s)	Rebecca Bross (USA)	6.1	8.825		14.925
2nd place, silver medalist(s)	Aly Raisman (USA)	5.9	8.775		14.675
3rd place, bronze medalist(s)	Wu Liufang (CHN)	5.9	8.725		14.625
4	Ksenia Afanasyeva (RUS)	5.6	8.925		14.525
5	Emily Little (AUS)	5.4	7.975		13.375
6	Kristina Vaculik (CAN)	5.6	7.750		13.350
7	Dominique Pegg (CAN)	5.5	7.600		13.100
8	Xi Hui Tay (SIN)	5.2	7.300		12.500

==== Floor exercise ====
Rank	Gymnast	D Score	E Score	Pen.	Total
1st place, gold medalist(s)	Rebecca Bross (USA)	6.2	8.975		15.175
2nd place, silver medalist(s)	Aly Raisman (USA)	5.7	8.925		14.625
3rd place, bronze medalist(s)	Kristina Vaculik (CAN)	5.4	8.625	0.1	13.925
4	See Teng Cheong (MAS)	5.3	8.450		13.750
5	Jiang Tong (CHN)	5.6	8.400	0.3	13.700
6	Ksenia Afanasyeva (RUS)	5.8	7.875		13.675
7	Wu Liufang (CHN)	5.5	8.075		13.575
8	Emily Little (AUS)	5.3	8.000	0.1	13.200

=== Juniors ===
==== All-around ====
Rank	Gymnast	Vault (gymnastics)	Uneven bars	Balance beam	Floor (gymnastics)	Total
1st place, gold medalist(s)	Jordyn Wieber (USA)	15.100	14.800	15.200	14.450	59.550
2nd place, silver medalist(s)	Kyla Ross (USA)	15.250	14.250	14.350	14.150	58.000
3rd place, bronze medalist(s)	Anna Rodionova (RUS)	13.550	13.900	13.250	12.750	53.450
4	Madeline Gardiner (CAN)	13.700	13.300	13.500	12.900	53.400
5	Tan Sixin (CHN)	13.850	13.200	13.200	12.950	53.200
6	Emma Collister (AUS)	14.050	13.000	12.800	13.050	52.900
7	Maria Stepanova (RUS)	13.250	13.050	13.350	13.200	52.850
8	Georgia Rose Brown (AUS)	13.250	13.450	12.250	12.900	52.100
9	Sabrina Gill (CAN)	13.700	12.800	13.250	11.650	51.400
10	Ing Yueh Tan (MAS)	13.200	10.450	12.000	11.750	47.400
11	Brittany Robertson (NZL)	12.500	10.350	11.750	12.200	47.400
12	En Ning Foo (SIN)	12.350	9.900	12.150	11.650	46.050
13	Pei Shi Giam (SIN)	12.350	9.900	11.300	10.200	43.750
14	Zeng Siqi (CHN)	-	13.300	13.000	13.200	39.500

==== Vault ====
Rank	Gymnast	D Score	E Score	Pen.	Total
1st place, gold medalist(s)	Kyla Ross (USA)	5.8	9.300		15.100
2nd place, silver medalist(s)	Jordyn Wieber (USA)	5.8	9.125		14.925
3rd place, bronze medalist(s)	Zhou Qiaohong (CHN)	6.0	8.325		14.325
4	Tan Sixin (CHN)	5.0	8.775		13.775
5	Madeline Gardiner (CAN)	5.0	8.675		13.675
6	Anna Rodionova (RUS)	5.0	8.650		13.650
7	Sabrina Gill (CAN)	5.0	8.625	0.1	13.525
7	Emma Collister (AUS)	5.2	8.325		13.525

==== Uneven bars ====
Rank	Gymnast	D Score	E Score	Pen.	Total
1st place, gold medalist(s)	Jordyn Wieber (USA)	5.9	8.925		14.825
2nd place, silver medalist(s)	Kyla Ross (USA)	5.0	9.250		14.250
3rd place, bronze medalist(s)	Zeng Siqi (CHN)	5.3	8.625		13.925
4	Georgia Rose Brown (AUS)	5.3	8.450		13.750
5	Maria Stepanova (RUS)	5.6	7.875		13.475
6	Emma Collister (AUS)	5.2	7.975		13.175
7	Madeline Gardiner (CAN)	5.3	7.500		12.800
8	Tan Sixin (CHN)	5.8	6.875		12.675

==== Balance beam ====
Rank	Gymnast	D Score	E Score	Pen.	Total
1st place, gold medalist(s)	Tan Sixin (CHN)	6.2	9.150		15.350
2nd place, silver medalist(s)	Sabrina Vega (USA)	5.8	8.675		14.475
3rd place, bronze medalist(s)	Madeline Gardiner (CAN)	5.9	8.525		14.425
4	Jordyn Wieber (USA)	6.1	7.925		14.025
5	Amelia McGrath (AUS)	5.6	8.375	0.1	13.875
6	Anna Rodionova (RUS)	5.6	7.400		13.000
7	Sabrina Gill (CAN)	5.3	7.625	0.1	12.825
8	Maria Stepanova (RUS)	5.2	7.175		12.375

==== Floor exercise ====
Rank	Gymnast	D Score	E Score	Pen.	Total
1st place, gold medalist(s)	Jordyn Wieber (USA)	5.7	8.900		14.600
2nd place, silver medalist(s)	Kyla Ross (USA)	5.4	8.800		14.200
3rd place, bronze medalist(s)	Amelia McGrath (AUS)	5.2	8.750		13.950
3rd place, bronze medalist(s)	Tan Sixin (CHN)	5.4	8.550		13.950
5	Maria Stepanova (RUS)	5.3	7.900		13.200
6	Emma Collister (AUS)	5.0	7.825		12.825
7	Zeng Siqi (CHN)	4.9	7.725		12.625
7	Madeline Gardiner (CAN)	5.4	7.325	0.1	12.625

== Medal count ==
Rank	Nation	Gold	Silver	Bronze	Total
1	United States	8	9	0	17
2	China	2	1	4	7
3	Canada	1	0	2	3
4	Australia	0	1	2	3
5	Russia	0	0	3	3
6	Mexico	0	0	1	1
Totals (6 entries)		11	11	12	34
