= Tan Sixin =

Chinese artistic gymnast

谭思欣 (Tán Sì Xīn)
- Born: January 10, 1995 (age 31) Jiangmen, Guangdong, China
- Height: 148 cm (4 ft 10 in)

Gymnastics career
- Discipline: Women's artistic gymnastics
- Country represented: China; (2009–13 (CHN))
- Club: National team
- Head coaches: He Hua, Liu Guicheng
Medal record
Event	1st	2nd	3rd
World Championships	0	0	1
Pacific Rim Championships	0	2	1
Youth Olympic Games	2	2	0
East Asian Games	4	0	0
National Games	4	0	1
Total	10	4	3
Women's gymnastics
Representing China
World Championships
Bronze medal – third place	2011 Tokyo	Team
Pacific Rim Championships
Silver medal – second place	2010 Melbourne	Team
Silver medal – second place	2012 Seattle	Team
Bronze medal – third place	2012 Seattle	Balance Beam
Youth Olympic Games
Gold medal – first place	2010 Singapore	Balance Beam
Gold medal – first place	2010 Singapore	Floor Exercise
Silver medal – second place	2010 Singapore	All-Around
Silver medal – second place	2010 Singapore	Uneven Bars
East Asian Games
Gold medal – first place	2013 Tianjin	Team
Gold medal – first place	2013 Tianjin	All-Around
Gold medal – first place	2013 Tianjin	Balance Beam
Gold medal – first place	2013 Tianjin	Floor Exercise
National Games
Gold medal – first place	2009 Jinan	Team
Gold medal – first place	2009 Jinan	Balance Beam
Gold medal – first place	2013 Dalian	Team
Gold medal – first place	2013 Dalian	Balance Beam
Bronze medal – third place	2013 Dalian	Floor Exercise

Tan Sixin (Chinese: 谭思欣; pinyin: Tán Sì Xīn, born January 10, 1995, in Jiangmen, Guangdong) is a retired female Chinese gymnast. She joined the Chinese national team in 2009. At age 14, she won the beam final in the 2009 National Games of China beating Olympians including World Champion Deng Linlin. At the Youth Olympics in 2010, she won Gold in the Beam and Floor Exercise and Silver in the All-Around and Uneven Bars final (after Viktoria Komova). She is a balance beam specialist, scoring as high as 15.550.

Tan became a senior in 2011. She won silver on floor at the Cottbus World Cup and gold on beam and bars at the Doha World Cup. At the 2011 Chinese National Championships she won gold with her represented team Shanghai and gold in the all around. She was named to the team for the 2011 World Artistic Gymnastics Championships held in October 2011 in Tokyo, Japan and won a bronze medal in the team final. However, multiple mistakes in the preliminary competition prevented her from entering the all-around and event finals.

Tan was an alternate for the 2012 Olympic team. She competed at the Individual National Championships finishing out of the medals in the uneven bars and balance beam, which many people consider her best events.
