= Valeria Maksyuta =

Israeli artistic gymnast

- Валерія Максюта
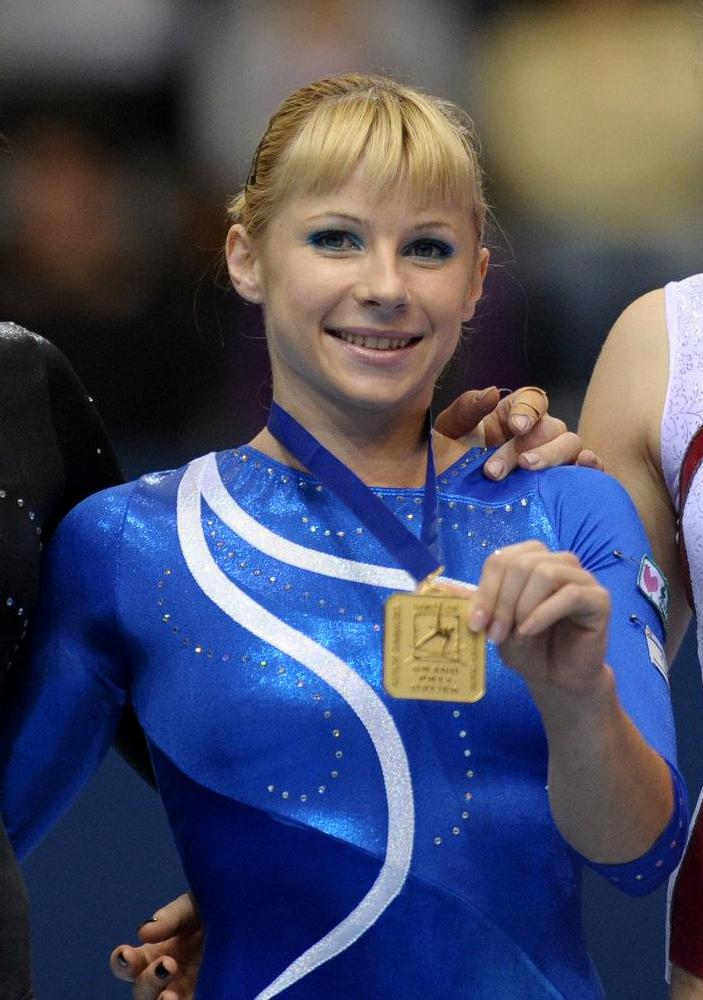
- Valeria Maksyuta

Personal information
- Full name: Valeria Maksyuta
- Alternative names: Valeriia Maksiuta, Валерія Максюта, Валерия Максюта
- Nickname: Maksi
- Born: September 27, 1987 (age 38) Kyiv, Ukraine
- Height: 155 cm (5.09 ft)

Gymnastics career
- Discipline: Women's artistic gymnastics
- Country represented: Israel
- Former countries represented: Ukraine
- Club: Maccabi Tzafon
- Head coaches: Diamov Tamava (Tzafon); Aaron Litvin (Tzafon); Oksana Slyusarchuk (Ukraine)
- Former coach: Lyudmila Pasyuta
- Choreographer: Oksana Omelianchik
Medal record
Gymnastics
Representing Ukraine
Maccabiah Games
Gold medal – first place	2005 Israel	all-around
Gold medal – first place	2005 Israel	balance beam
Gold medal – first place	2005 Israel	floor
Bronze medal – third place	2005 Israel	uneven bars
Summer Universiade
Silver medal – second place	2005 Izmir	Vault
Representing Israel
FIG World Cup
Bronze medal – third place	2009 Osijek	uneven bars
Maccabiah Games
Gold medal – first place	2009 Israel	vault
Silver medal – second place	2009 Israel	all-around
Silver medal – second place	2009 Israel	uneven bars

Valeria Vladimirovna Maksyuta (Ukrainian: Валерія Володимирівна Максюта, Russian: Валерия Владимировна Максюта, Hebrew: ולריה מקסיוטה; born September 27, 1987) is a former artistic gymnast who represented Ukraine for several years before immigrating to Israel in 2007.

== Biography ==
Valeria Maksyuta started training at the age of 5 in her native Kyiv. Her first coach was Lyudmila Alexandrovna Pasyuta. In Ukraine she trained at Sports school No. 20, a physical education school for children and youth. At the age of 13 she earned the title Master of Sports. For six years she was part of the Ukrainian national team.

After winning the 2005 Maccabiah Games, she received a proposal to join the Israeli national team. Two years later she received another proposal, from Maccabi Tzafon's owner, Aaron Litvin, to join his club and represent Israel. This time she accepted the offer and immigrated to Israel.

After moving to Israel, she achieved good results internationally, with help from her former coach in Ukraine, Oksana Slyusarchuk, and her choreographer Oksana Omelianchik. She continued to train in both Israel and Kyiv.

== Sports career ==
=== 2001–2007 ===
Maksyuta won a bronze medal on the uneven bars at the 2001 Ukrainian Championships.

In the 2005 Maccabiah Games, she won gold medals in the all-around, the balance beam and the floor exercise as well as a bronze medal on the uneven bars. She won another gold medal on the balance beam at the 2005 Ukrainian Championships. She competed at the 2005 Stella Zakharova Cup, winning gold medals in the all-around and on the vault as well as a bronze medal on the balance beam.

A year later she competed at the 2006 Stella Zakharova Cup and won a gold medal on the vault.

In 2007, she won another medal on the vault at the 2007 Stella Zakharova Cup, this time silver, as well as a silver medal on the balance beam at the 2007 Voronin Cup.

=== 2009–2010 ===
In the 2009 Maccabiah Games, Maksyuta won silver medals in the all-around and on the uneven bars, as well as a gold on the vault. At her first Israeli Championships, in 2009, she won a silver medal in the all-around. At the 2009 Stella Zakharova Cup she represented Israel and won a gold medal on the balance beam, a silver medal in the floor exercise and a bronze medal on the uneven bars. At the 2009 Scherbo Cup, she won a bronze medal on the vault. At the 2009 FIG World Cup she won a bronze medal on the uneven bars.

In 2010 Maksyuta only won three medals, a silver medal on the balance beam at the 2010 Scherbo Cup and another silver medal on the balance beam as well as the bronze medal in the all-around at the 2010 Voronin Cup.

=== 2011 ===
In 2011, Maksyuta won a lot of medals. At the 2011 Belarus Cup Open she won gold medals in the all-around, on the balance beam and on the vault, as well as a bronze medal in the floor exercise. At the 2011 Israeli Championships she won silver medals in the all-around, on the vault, on the uneven bars and in the floor exercise, as well as a gold medal on the balance beam. At the 2011 Scherbo Cup she won gold medals in the all-around, on the vault, on the balance beam and in the floor exercise while at the 2011 Voronin Cup she won a gold medal only on the vault, as well as a silver medal on the balance beam and bronze medals in the all-around and the floor exercise.

She also competed in the FIG World Challenger Cups. In Grand Prix Ghent she won a silver medal on the vault. In Grand Prix Maribor she won a gold medal on the vault and silver medals on the uneven bars and balance beam. In Grand Prix Osijek, she won a gold medal on the vault and a bronze medal on the balance beam. In Grand Prix Ostrava she won gold medals on the vault and the balance beam as well as a bronze medal in the floor exercise.

=== 2012 ===
At the 2012 Gymnastics Olympic Test Event Maksyuta won a silver medal on the vault and a bronze medal on the balance beam. After that she competed in the Grand Prix Cottbus and won a silver medal on the balance beam. She competed at the 2012 European Women's Artistic Gymnastics Championships, and managed fourth place on the vault and 8th place on the balance beam.

At the 2012 Summer Olympics Maksyuta fell from uneven bars and injured her back. She also fell on the other events and finished last in the preliminaries. It was described as one of the worst performances of an Israeli gymnast as well as below-par disappointing, and Maksyuta herself described it as awful.

The back injury forced Maksyuta to retire after the Olympics. She said she was devastated when told by doctors on September 27, 2012 – her 25th birthday – that her injury was too severe to allow her to continue. "Not only did I not celebrate, but I felt that one day that I ran out of life. After 20 years in the sport, it was gone from my life, the door shut in my face. I knew I was not made of iron, but I was so used to training and I loved it so much. For a whole month I was traumatized and I didn't know how to get along without it." She is coaching in Israel and hopes to open her own Pilates studio.

== See also ==
- Gymnastics in Israel
