= Nadine Jarosch =

German artistic gymnast

Nadine Jarosch (born 28 April 1995) is a German gymnast. She competed for the national team at the 2012 Summer Olympics in the Women's artistic team all-around.
