= Wu Liufang =

Chinese artistic gymnast

- Full name: 吴柳芳 (Wu Liufang)
- Born: 22 December 1994 (age 31) Liuzhou, Guangxi

Gymnastics career
- Discipline: Women's artistic gymnastics
- Country represented: China; (2008–13 (CHN))
- Head coaches: Wang Liming, Sun Haiou 孙海鸥
- Retired: October 2013
Medal record
Representing China
Pacific Rim Championships
Silver medal – second place	2010 Melbourne	Team
Bronze medal – third place	2010 Melbourne	Balance Beam
Asian Championships
Gold medal – first place	2012 Putian	Team
Gold medal – first place	2012 Putian	Uneven Bars
East Asian Games
Gold medal – first place	2013 Tianjin	Team
National Games
Silver medal – second place	2009 Jinan	Team
Bronze medal – third place	2009 Jinan	Uneven Bars

Wu Liufang (simplified Chinese: 吴柳芳; traditional Chinese: 吳柳芳; pinyin: Wú Liǔfāng), born on 22 December 1994, is a retired Chinese gymnast. Post retirement, she became a teacher before turning into an online influencer in 2024.

== Career ==
=== Gymnastics career ===
Wu Liufang made the Chinese national team in 2008. At the 11th Chinese national games in September 2009, she achieved bronze for uneven bars and silver for the team event (as part of Guangdong team).

Wu participated in the 2010 Doha World Cup, where she won gold on balance beam and floor, and silver on uneven bars. She also won beam gold at the 17th Internationaux de France world cup held in Paris Bercy.

At the 2010 Chinese national championships, Wu participating for the Guangdong team, won silver in all-round, and came 4th in uneven bars and 4th in beam.

In 2012 during the trials for Olympic qualifications, Wu injured her neck. Wu retired from gymnastics in October 2013.

=== Post gymnastics ===
After retiring, Wu further her studies at Beijing Sport University before becoming a teacher. She would also involve herself in gymnastics related activities such as refereeing at gymnastics youth competitions, teaching, etc.

In 2019, she became a live-streamer, earning a base salary of RMB 3,000 a month in order to pay off her mother's medical bills. In March 2024, she signed with Da Hai Xing Chen, a multi-channel network soon after as her account gained followers exponentially. Wu uploaded video clips of herself dancing in short shorts, mini skirts and stockings frequently. This eventually led to Guan Chenchen, Wu's junior in the national gymnastics team, criticising Wu publicly and turning public attention to Wu's current job. Despite a public apology, Wu's account was taken down by the platform in November 2024, censured and returned with most of her videos removed. On 24 December 2024, her Douyin account, along with 11 other accounts, was banned, and its monetization privileges were revoked. In addition to the ban, the platform removed her substantial number of followers as part of its effort to “maintain a clean online environment.” The multi-channel network representing Wu faced a 30-day restriction on account management after Douyin's safety center accused them of leveraging accounts to disseminate “vulgar content to attract followers, causing significant negative impact.” After the restrictions was lifted and despite proactively deleting her own content that would be deemed as controversial, her followers count would exceed 6 million which led to further intervention and restrictions by the platform. This left her with 44,000 followers.

From 2025 on, Wu begun to post videos about traditional Chinese culture or the attire of ethnic minorities, and gained 400,000 followers. She repaid her mother's medical bills amounting to RMB 400,000 by March 2026.

== Competitive history ==
Year	Competition	Location	Apparatus	Rank-Final	Score-Final	Rank-Qualifying	Score-Qualifying
2011	World Cup	Ghent	Uneven Bars	3	15.350	1	15.350
2011	World Cup	Ghent	Balance Beam	1	14.975	2	14.850
2011	World Cup	Ghent	Floor Exercise	2	13.650	3	13.475
2010	World Cup	Ghent	Uneven Bars	1	15.050	2	14.775
2010	World Cup	Ghent	Balance Beam	3	13.650	2	14.700
2010	World Cup	Ghent	Floor	6	12.700	5	13.450
2010	World Cup	Doha	Uneven Bars	2	13.850	2	15.025
2010	World Cup	Doha	Balance Beam	1	14.700	1	14.525
2010	World Cup	Doha	Floor	1	13.975	6	12.950
2010	World Cup	Paris Bercy	Balance Beam	1	14.875	1	14.725
2009	National Games	Shandong	Team	2			
2009	National Games	Shandong	Uneven Bars	3			
