= Gymnastics at the 2018 Asian Games – Women's floor =

Women's floor at the 2018 Asian Games
- Venue: Jakarta International Expo
- Date: 21–24 August 2018
- Competitors: 46 from 14 nations

Medalists
gold medal	Kim Su-jong	North Korea
silver medal	Rifda Irfanaluthfi	Indonesia
bronze medal	Shiho Nakaji	Japan

The women's floor competition at the 2018 Asian Games took place on 21 and 24 August 2018 at the Jakarta International Expo Hall D2.

== Schedule ==
All times are Western Indonesia Time (UTC+07:00)

Date	Time	Event
Tuesday, 21 August 2018	14:00	Qualification
Friday, 24 August 2018	18:00	Final

== Results ==
Legend

- DNS — Did not start

=== Qualification ===
Rank	Athlete	Score
1	Chen Yile (CHN)	13.150
1	Shiho Nakaji (JPN)	13.150
3	Yeo Seo-jeong (KOR)	12.900
4	Kim Su-jong (PRK)	12.700
5	Rifda Irfanaluthfi (INA)	12.650
6	Soyoka Hanawa (JPN)	12.600
7	Tan Ing Yueh (MAS)	12.600
8	Kim Ju-ry (KOR)	12.600
9	Farah Ann Abdul Hadi (MAS)	12.550
10	Ham Mi-ju (KOR)	12.500
11	Trần Đoàn Quỳnh Nam (VIE)	12.500
12	Pyon Rye-yong (PRK)	12.450
13	Yurika Yumoto (JPN)	12.400
14	Fang Ko-ching (TPE)	12.400
15	Kim Won-yong (PRK)	12.400
16	Liu Jinru (CHN)	12.300
17	Luo Huan (CHN)	12.150
18	Corinne Bunagan (PHI)	12.100
19	Trương Khánh Vân (VIE)	11.900
20	Jon Jang-mi (PRK)	11.850
21	Yun Na-rae (KOR)	11.850
22	Chen Chian-shiun (TPE)	11.800
23	Aida Bauyrzhanova (KAZ)	11.550
24	Nadine Joy Nathan (SGP)	11.500
24	Thidaporn Khanthara (THA)	11.500
26	Sasiwimon Mueangphuan (THA)	11.450
27	Amalia Nurun Fauziah (INA)	11.350
28	Dipa Karmakar (IND)	11.300
29	Bùi Nguyễn Hải Yến (VIE)	11.300
30	Pranati Das (IND)	11.300
31	Tracie Ang (MAS)	11.250
32	Aruna Reddy (IND)	11.250
33	Chuang Hsiu-ju (TPE)	11.200
34	Olga Sanjiyeva (KAZ)	11.150
35	Yuki Uchiyama (JPN)	11.100
36	Sabina Turobova (UZB)	11.050
37	Armartiani (INA)	11.000
38	Tienna Nguyen (VIE)	10.850
39	Pranati Nayak (IND)	10.750
40	Cristina Onofre (PHI)	10.750
41	Arailym Meiram (KAZ)	10.650
42	Huang Hui-mei (TPE)	10.500
43	Praewpraw Doungchan (THA)	10.400
44	Tan Sze En (SGP)	10.350
45	Tazsa Miranda Devira (INA)	9.050
—	Zhang Jin (CHN)	DNS

=== Final ===
Rank	Athlete	Score
1st place, gold medalist(s)	Kim Su-jong (PRK)	13.025
2nd place, silver medalist(s)	Rifda Irfanaluthfi (INA)	12.750
3rd place, bronze medalist(s)	Shiho Nakaji (JPN)	12.600
4	Kim Ju-ry (KOR)	12.550
5	Chen Yile (CHN)	12.500
6	Tan Ing Yueh (MAS)	12.450
7	Yeo Seo-jeong (KOR)	12.425
8	Soyoka Hanawa (JPN)	12.375
