= Gymnastics at the 2018 Asian Games – Women's uneven bars =

Women's uneven bars at the 2018 Asian Games
- Venue: Jakarta International Expo
- Date: 21–23 August 2018
- Competitors: 44 from 14 nations

Medalists
gold medal	Liu Tingting	China
silver medal	Luo Huan	China
bronze medal	Jon Jang-mi	North Korea

The women's uneven bars competition at the 2018 Asian Games took place on 21 and 23 August 2018 at the Jakarta International Expo Hall D2.

== Schedule ==
All times are Western Indonesia Time (UTC+07:00)

Date	Time	Event
Tuesday, 21 August 2018	14:00	Qualification
Thursday, 23 August 2018	18:00	Final

== Results ==
Legend

- DNS — Did not start

=== Qualification ===
Rank	Athlete	Score
1	Liu Tingting (CHN)	14.850
2	Luo Huan (CHN)	14.600
3	Chen Yile (CHN)	14.200
4	Jon Jang-mi (PRK)	14.050
5	Yuki Uchiyama (JPN)	13.700
6	Kim Su-jong (PRK)	13.500
7	Yumika Nakamura (JPN)	13.300
8	Kim Ju-ry (KOR)	13.150
9	Farah Ann Abdul Hadi (MAS)	13.150
10	Kim Won-yong (PRK)	13.100
11	Lee Eun-ju (KOR)	13.100
12	Jong Un-gyong (PRK)	13.000
13	Yun Na-rae (KOR)	12.550
14	Tienna Nguyen (VIE)	12.500
15	Corinne Bunagan (PHI)	12.300
16	Chen Chian-shiun (TPE)	12.250
17	Yurika Yumoto (JPN)	12.250
18	Fang Ko-ching (TPE)	12.100
19	Chuang Hsiu-ju (TPE)	12.000
20	Tazsa Miranda Devira (INA)	11.950
21	Shiho Nakaji (JPN)	11.750
22	Nadine Joy Nathan (SGP)	11.650
23	Aruna Reddy (IND)	11.400
24	Sasiwimon Mueangphuan (THA)	11.400
25	Aida Bauyrzhanova (KAZ)	11.300
26	Tan Ing Yueh (MAS)	11.250
27	Dipa Karmakar (IND)	11.200
28	Arailym Meiram (KAZ)	11.050
29	Lai Pin-ju (TPE)	11.000
30	Pranati Das (IND)	11.000
31	Amalia Nurun Fauziah (INA)	10.900
32	Thidaporn Khanthara (THA)	10.800
33	Trần Đoàn Quỳnh Nam (VIE)	10.800
34	Olga Sanjiyeva (KAZ)	10.400
35	Sabina Turobova (UZB)	10.200
36	Pranati Nayak (IND)	10.200
37	Armartiani (INA)	10.050
38	Praewpraw Doungchan (THA)	9.950
39	Yeo Seo-jeong (KOR)	9.900
40	Tracie Ang (MAS)	9.800
41	Kanyanat Boontoeng (THA)	9.000
42	Bùi Nguyễn Hải Yến (VIE)	8.950
43	Rifda Irfanaluthfi (INA)	8.550
—	Zhang Jin (CHN)	DNS

=== Final ===
Rank	Athlete	Score
1st place, gold medalist(s)	Liu Tingting (CHN)	14.600
2nd place, silver medalist(s)	Luo Huan (CHN)	14.225
3rd place, bronze medalist(s)	Jon Jang-mi (PRK)	14.200
4	Yuki Uchiyama (JPN)	13.850
5	Farah Ann Abdul Hadi (MAS)	13.200
6	Kim Ju-ry (KOR)	13.175
7	Yumika Nakamura (JPN)	13.075
8	Kim Su-jong (PRK)	11.925
