= Gymnastics at the 2018 Asian Games – Women's balance beam =

Women's balance beam at the 2018 Asian Games
- Venue: Jakarta International Expo
- Date: 21–24 August 2018
- Competitors: 49 from 16 nations

Medalists
gold medal	Chen Yile	China
silver medal	Kim Su-jong	North Korea
bronze medal	Zhang Jin	China

The women's Balance Beam competition at the 2018 Asian Games took place on the 21st and 24 August 2018 at the Jakarta International Expo Hall D2.

== Schedule ==
All times are Western Indonesia Time (UTC+07:00)

Date	Time	Event
Tuesday, 21 August 2018	14:00	Qualification
Friday, 24 August 2018	16:38	Final

== Results ==
=== Qualification ===
Rank	Athlete	Score
1	Chen Yile (CHN)	14.800
2	Zhang Jin (CHN)	14.450
3	Luo Huan (CHN)	14.100
4	Liu Tingting (CHN)	13.950
5	Kim Su-jong (PRK)	13.100
6	Shiho Nakaji (JPN)	13.050
7	Dipa Karmakar (IND)	12.750
7	Pyon Rye-yong (PRK)	12.750
9	Yeo Seo-jeong (KOR)	12.500
10	Nadine Joy Nathan (SGP)	12.400
11	Rifda Irfanaluthfi (INA)	12.400
12	Jon Jang-mi (PRK)	12.350
13	Farah Ann Abdul Hadi (MAS)	12.300
14	Kim Ju-ry (KOR)	12.200
15	Lee Eun-ju (KOR)	12.150
16	Yumika Nakamura (JPN)	12.100
17	Kim Won-yong (PRK)	12.100
18	Tan Ing Yueh (MAS)	12.050
19	Pranati Das (IND)	11.900
20	Ng Yan Yin (HKG)	11.900
21	Aruna Reddy (IND)	11.850
22	Oksana Chusovitina (UZB)	11.800
23	Chuang Hsiu-ju (TPE)	11.800
24	Aida Bauyrzhanova (KAZ)	11.800
25	Yun Na-rae (KOR)	11.800
26	Lai Pin-ju (TPE)	11.800
27	Bùi Nguyễn Hải Yến (VIE)	11.700
28	Trần Đoàn Quỳnh Nam (VIE)	11.650
29	Tan Sze En (SGP)	11.500
30	Sasiwimon Mueangphuan (THA)	11.400
31	Tracie Ang (MAS)	11.350
32	Yuki Uchiyama (JPN)	11.350
33	Corinne Bunagan (PHI)	11.300
34	Fang Ko-ching (TPE)	11.250
35	Tienna Nguyen (VIE)	11.150
36	Soyoka Hanawa (JPN)	11.100
37	Armartiani (INA)	11.050
38	Amalia Nurun Fauziah (INA)	11.050
39	Arailym Meiram (KAZ)	10.950
40	Tazsa Miranda Devira (INA)	10.900
41	Huang Hui-mei (TPE)	10.650
42	Sabina Turobova (UZB)	10.600
43	Kanyanat Boontoeng (THA)	10.550
44	Thidaporn Khanthara (THA)	10.500
45	Trương Khánh Vân (VIE)	10.400
46	Mandira Chowdhury (IND)	10.350
47	Praewpraw Doungchan (THA)	10.150
48	Olga Sanjiyeva (KAZ)	9.500
49	Jana El-Keky (QAT)	8.800

=== Final ===
Rank	Athlete	Score
1st place, gold medalist(s)	Chen Yile (CHN)	14.600
2nd place, silver medalist(s)	Kim Su-jong (PRK)	13.400
3rd place, bronze medalist(s)	Zhang Jin (CHN)	13.325
4	Shiho Nakaji (JPN)	12.600
5	Dipa Karmakar (IND)	12.500
6	Pyon Rye-yong (PRK)	12.400
7	Nadine Joy Nathan (SGP)	12.325
8	Yeo Seo-jeong (KOR)	12.225
