= Gymnastics at the 2018 Asian Games – Women's artistic team =

Women's team at the 2018 Asian Games
- Venue: Jakarta International Expo
- Date: 21–22 August 2018
- Competitors: 49 from 11 nations

Medalists
gold medal	China; Chen Yile, Liu Jinru, Liu Tingting, Luo Huan, Zhang Jin
silver medal	North Korea; Jon Jang-mi, Jong Un-gyong, Kim Su-jong, Kim Won-yong, Pyon Rye-yong
bronze medal	Japan; Soyoka Hanawa, Shiho Nakaji, Yumika Nakamura, Yuki Uchiyama, Yurika Yumoto

The Women's artistic team all-around competition at the 2018 Asian Games was held on 21 and 22 August 2018 at the Jakarta International Expo Hall D2.

== Schedule ==
All times are Western Indonesia Time (UTC+07:00)

Date	Time	Event
Tuesday, 21 August 2018	14:00	Qualification
Wednesday, 22 August 2018	18:00	Final

== Results ==
Legend

- DNS — Did not start

=== Qualification ===
Rank	Team	Vault (gymnastics)	Uneven bars	Balance beam	Floor (gymnastics)	Total
1	China (CHN)	41.500	43.650	43.350	37.600	166.100
	Chen Yile	13.800	14.200	14.800	13.150	
	Liu Jinru	14.000			12.300	
	Liu Tingting		14.850	~~13.950~~		
	Luo Huan	13.700	14.600	14.100	12.150	
	Zhang Jin	~~12.900~~	~~DNS~~	14.450	~~DNS~~	
2	North Korea (PRK)	42.100	40.650	38.200	37.550	158.500
	Jon Jang-mi	~~13.300~~	14.050	12.350	~~11.850~~	
	Jong Un-gyong		~~13.000~~			
	Kim Su-jong	14.300	13.500	13.100	12.700	
	Kim Won-yong	13.500	13.100	~~12.100~~	12.400	
	Pyon Rye-yong	14.300		12.750	12.450	
3	South Korea (KOR)	41.650	38.800	36.850	38.000	155.300
	Ham Mi-ju	13.450			12.500	
	Kim Ju-ry	~~13.450~~	13.150	12.200	12.600	
	Lee Eun-ju		13.100	12.150		
	Yeo Seo-jeong	14.600	~~9.900~~	12.500	12.900	
	Yun Na-rae	13.600	12.550	~~11.800~~	~~11.850~~	
4	Japan (JPN)	40.050	39.250	36.500	38.150	153.950
	Soyoka Hanawa	~~12.700~~		~~11.100~~	12.600	
	Shiho Nakaji	13.300	~~11.750~~	13.050	13.150	
	Yumika Nakamura	13.350	13.300	12.100		
	Yuki Uchiyama	13.400	13.700	11.350	~~11.100~~	
	Yurika Yumoto		12.250		12.400	
5	Chinese Taipei (TPE)	39.400	36.350	34.850	35.400	146.000
	Chen Chian-shiun		12.250		11.800	
	Chuang Hsiu-ju	12.950	12.000	11.800	11.200	
	Huang Hui-mei	13.100		~~10.650~~	~~10.500~~	
	Fang Ko-ching	13.350	12.100	11.250	12.400	
	Lai Pin-ju	~~12.750~~	~~11.000~~	11.800		
6	Malaysia (MAS)	39.200	34.200	35.700	36.400	145.500
	Farah Ann Abdul Hadi	13.200	13.150	12.300	12.550	
	Tracie Ang	12.700	9.800	11.350	11.250	
	Tan Ing Yueh	13.300	11.250	12.050	12.600	
7	India (IND)	40.350	33.600	36.500	33.850	144.300
	Mandira Chowdhury			~~10.350~~		
	Pranati Das	~~12.800~~	11.000	11.900	11.300	
	Dipa Karmakar	13.450	11.200	12.750	11.300	
	Pranati Nayak	13.500	~~10.200~~		~~10.750~~	
	Aruna Reddy	13.400	11.400	11.850	11.250	
8	Indonesia (INA)	38.450	32.900	34.500	35.000	140.850
	Armartiani	12.550	10.050	11.050	11.000	
	Muthia Nur Cahya	~~12.000~~				
	Tazsa Miranda Devira		11.950	~~10.900~~	~~9.050~~	
	Amalia Nurun Fauziah	12.400	10.900	11.050	11.350	
	Rifda Irfanaluthfi	13.500	~~8.550~~	12.400	12.650	
9	Vietnam (VIE)	38.150	32.250	34.500	35.700	140.600
	Bùi Nguyễn Hải Yến	12.650	8.950	11.700	11.300	
	Tienna Nguyen	12.600	12.500	11.150	~~10.850~~	
	Trần Đoàn Quỳnh Nam	12.900	10.800	11.650	12.500	
	Trương Khánh Vân	~~12.150~~		~~10.400~~	11.900	
10	Thailand (THA)	38.050	32.150	32.450	33.350	136.000
	Kanyanat Boontoeng	12.600	~~9.000~~	10.550		
	Praewpraw Doungchan	12.750	9.950	~~10.150~~	10.400	
	Thidaporn Khanthara	12.700	10.800	10.500	11.500	
	Sasiwimon Mueangphuan	~~12.500~~	11.400	11.400	11.450	
11	Kazakhstan (KAZ)	37.600	32.750	32.250	33.350	135.950
	Aida Bauyrzhanova	12.300	11.300	11.800	11.550	
	Arailym Meiram	12.650	11.050	10.950	10.650	
	Olga Sanjiyeva	12.650	10.400	9.500	11.150	

=== Final ===
Rank	Team	Vault (gymnastics)	Uneven bars	Balance beam	Floor (gymnastics)	Total
1st place, gold medalist(s)	China (CHN)	41.450	41.650	42.850	39.300	165.250
	Chen Yile		13.500	14.750	13.400	
	Liu Jinru	14.100			12.800	
	Liu Tingting	13.650	14.700	14.200		
	Luo Huan	13.700	13.450			
	Zhang Jin			13.900	13.100	
2nd place, silver medalist(s)	North Korea (PRK)	41.350	40.300	39.250	36.450	157.350
	Jon Jang-mi		14.100	12.450		
	Jong Un-gyong					
	Kim Su-jong	14.000	13.400	13.050	12.650	
	Kim Won-yong	13.250	12.800	13.750	11.800	
	Pyon Rye-yong	14.100			12.000	
3rd place, bronze medalist(s)	Japan (JPN)	40.700	38.500	39.350	38.600	157.150
	Soyoka Hanawa	13.600		13.450	12.700	
	Shiho Nakaji		12.450	13.100	13.200	
	Yumika Nakamura		13.500	12.800		
	Yuki Uchiyama	13.500	12.550			
	Yurika Yumoto	13.600			12.700	
4	South Korea (KOR)	41.650	38.750	35.550	34.400	150.350
	Ham Mi-ju	13.700			12.150	
	Kim Ju-ry		12.550	10.050	9.700	
	Lee Eun-ju		13.250			
	Yeo Seo-jeong	14.550	12.950	13.400	12.550	
	Yun Na-rae	13.400		12.100		
5	Chinese Taipei (TPE)	39.700	33.600	34.650	34.850	142.800
	Chen Chian-shiun		10.300		11.600	
	Chuang Hsiu-ju	13.150	11.650	11.200		
	Huang Hui-mei	12.800			10.800	
	Fang Ko-ching	13.750	11.650	11.950	12.450	
	Lai Pin-ju			11.500		
6	Malaysia (MAS)	39.150	34.900	31.000	35.050	140.100
	Farah Ann Abdul Hadi	13.350	12.600	11.450	12.800	
	Tracie Ang	12.950	9.900	9.800	10.950	
	Tan Ing Yueh	12.850	12.400	9.750	11.300	
7	India (IND)	39.100	32.400	32.400	34.150	138.050
	Mandira Chowdhury			9.450		
	Pranati Das	12.300	10.950	11.300	11.600	
	Dipa Karmakar					
	Pranati Nayak	13.250	10.700		10.850	
	Aruna Reddy	13.550	10.750	11.650	11.700	
8	Indonesia (INA)	37.600	27.900	32.050	31.800	129.350
	Armartiani	12.900	9.400	11.300	9.650	
	Muthia Nur Cahya					
	Tazsa Miranda Devira	11.800	8.300	10.300	10.500	
	Amalia Nurun Fauziah	12.900	10.200	10.450	11.650	
	Rifda Irfanaluthfi					
