= Gymnastics at the 2018 Asian Games – Women's artistic individual all-around =

2018 Asian Games competition

Women's individual all-around at the 2018 Asian Games
- Venue: Jakarta International Expo
- Date: 21 August 2018
- Competitors: 34 from 14 nations

Medalists
gold medal	Chen Yile	China
silver medal	Luo Huan	China
bronze medal	Kim Su-jong	North Korea

The women's artistic individual all-around competition at the 2018 Asian Games was held on 21 August 2018 at the Jakarta International Expo Hall D2.

== Schedule ==
All times are Western Indonesia Time (UTC+07:00)

Date	Time	Event
Tuesday, 21 August 2018	14:00	Final

== Results ==
Legend

- DNF — Did not finish
- DNS — Did not start

Rank	Athlete	Vault (gymnastics)	Uneven bars	Balance beam	Floor (gymnastics)	Total
1st place, gold medalist(s)	Chen Yile (CHN)	13.800	14.200	14.800	13.150	55.950
2nd place, silver medalist(s)	Luo Huan (CHN)	13.700	14.600	14.100	12.150	54.550
3rd place, bronze medalist(s)	Kim Su-jong (PRK)	14.300	13.500	13.100	12.700	53.600
4	Jon Jang-mi (PRK)	13.300	14.050	12.350	11.850	51.550
5	Kim Ju-ry (KOR)	13.450	13.150	12.200	12.600	51.400
6	Shiho Nakaji (JPN)	13.300	11.750	13.050	13.150	51.250
7	Farah Ann Abdul Hadi (MAS)	13.200	13.150	12.300	12.550	51.200
—	Kim Won-yong (PRK)	13.500	13.100	12.100	12.400	51.100
8	Yeo Seo-jeong (KOR)	14.600	9.900	12.500	12.900	49.900
—	Yun Na-rae (KOR)	13.600	12.550	11.800	11.850	49.800
9	Yuki Uchiyama (JPN)	13.400	13.700	11.350	11.100	49.550
10	Tan Ing Yueh (MAS)	13.300	11.250	12.050	12.600	49.200
11	Fang Ko-ching (TPE)	13.350	12.100	11.250	12.400	49.100
12	Corinne Bunagan (PHI)	13.250	12.300	11.300	12.100	48.950
13	Dipa Karmakar (IND)	13.450	11.200	12.750	11.300	48.700
13	Nadine Joy Nathan (SGP)	13.150	11.650	12.400	11.500	48.700
15	Chuang Hsiu-ju (TPE)	12.950	12.000	11.800	11.200	47.950
16	Aruna Reddy (IND)	13.400	11.400	11.850	11.250	47.900
17	Trần Đoàn Quỳnh Nam (VIE)	12.900	10.800	11.650	12.500	47.850
18	Rifda Irfanaluthfi (INA)	13.500	8.550	12.400	12.650	47.100
18	Tienna Nguyen (VIE)	12.600	12.500	11.150	10.850	47.100
—	Pranati Das (IND)	12.800	11.000	11.900	11.300	47.000
20	Aida Bauyrzhanova (KAZ)	12.300	11.300	11.800	11.550	46.950
21	Sasiwimon Mueangphuan (THA)	12.500	11.400	11.400	11.450	46.750
22	Amalia Nurun Fauziah (INA)	12.400	10.900	11.050	11.350	45.700
23	Thidaporn Khanthara (THA)	12.700	10.800	10.500	11.500	45.500
24	Arailym Meiram (KAZ)	12.650	11.050	10.950	10.650	45.300
—	Tracie Ang (MAS)	12.700	9.800	11.350	11.250	45.100
—	Armartiani (INA)	12.550	10.050	11.050	11.000	44.650
—	Bùi Nguyễn Hải Yến (VIE)	12.650	8.950	11.700	11.300	44.600
25	Sabina Turobova (UZB)	12.050	10.200	10.600	11.050	43.900
—	Olga Sanjiyeva (KAZ)	12.650	10.400	9.500	11.150	43.700
—	Praewpraw Doungchan (THA)	12.750	9.950	10.150	10.400	43.250
—	Zhang Jin (CHN)	12.900	DNS	14.450	DNS	DNF
