= 2017 in artistic gymnastics =

Below is a list of notable women's artistic gymnastics events scheduled to be held in 2017, as well as the medalists.

== Calendar of events ==
=== International level ===
| Date | Location | Event | Winner(s) |
|---|---|---|---|
| February 4 | (Iceland) Reykjavík | Reykjavik International Games | Senior/Junior AA: (Netherlands) Eythora Thorsdottir / (Russia) Irina Komnova; Senior/Junior VT: (United States) Sydney Johnson-Scharpf / (Russia) Irina Komnova; Senior UB: (Russia) Daria Spiridonova / (Russia) Irina Komnova & (Iceland) Margret Kristinsdottir; Senior BB: (Netherlands) Eythora Thorsdottir / (Russia) Irina Komnova; Senior FX: (United States) Sydney Johnson-Scharpf / (Russia) Irina Komnova |
| February 10–12 | (United States) Oklahoma | Nadia Comăneci Invitational | TF: Deva Romania; Senior/Junior AA: (Canada) Laurie-Lou Vezina / Laura Iacob |
| February 16–19 | (Australia) Melbourne | Melbourne World Cup | VT: (China) Wang Yan; UB: (China) Liu Tingting; BB: (China) Liu Tingting; FX: (Australia) Emily Little |
| February 17–19 | (United States) Frisco | WOGA Classic | TF: (Japan); Senior AA: (Japan) Kiko Kuwajima / (Russia) Angelina Simakova; Senior VT: (Japan) Kiko Kuwajima / (United States) Jaylene Gilstrap; Senior UB: (China) Lyu Jiaqi / (United States) Audrey Davis; Senior BB: (United States) Luisa Blanco / (Russia) Angelina Simakova; Senior FX: (Japan) Nagi Kajita / (Russia) Angelina Simakova |
| March 4 | (United States) Newark | AT&T American Cup | AA: (United States) Ragan Smith |
| March 9–12 | (Canada) Montreal | International Gymnix | Senior/Junior TF: Canada / United States; Senior/Junior AA: (Japan) Hitomi Hatakeda / Maile O'Keefe; Senior VT: Shallon Olsen / Emma Malabuyo; Senior UB: (Japan) Hitomi Hatakeda / Gabby Perea; Senior BB: (Japan) Hitomi Hatakeda / Gabby Perea; Senior FX: (Japan) Hitomi Hatakeda / Maile O'Keefe & Gabby Perea |
| March 16–19 | (Azerbaijan) Baku | Baku World Cup | VT: (Uzbekistan) Oksana Chusovitina; UB: (Ukraine) Diana Varinska; BB: (Romania) Cătălina Ponor; FX: (Romania) Cătălina Ponor |
| March 17–19 | (Germany) Stuttgart | Stuttgart World Cup | AA: (Germany) Tabea Alt |
| March 17–19 | (Germany) Stuttgart | DTB Pokal Team Challenge | TF: Russia |
| March 22–25 | (Qatar) Doha | Doha World Cup | VT: (Uzbekistan) Oksana Chusovitina; UB: (China) Luo Huan; BB: (China) Liu Tingting; FX: (China) Liu Tingting |
| March 25–26 | (France) Saint-Étienne | Sainté Gym Cup | TF: France; Senior AA: Léanne Bourgeois; Junior AA: (Italy) Alessia Canali |
| March 28 – April 3 | (Italy) Jesolo | City of Jesolo Trophy | Senior/Junior TF: United States / United States; Senior/Junior AA: Riley McCusker / Gabby Perea; Senior/Junior VT: (Canada) Shallon Olsen / Gabby Perea; Senior/Junior UB: (Russia) Elena Eremina / (Italy) Elisa Iorio & Gabby Perea; Senior/Junior BB: Riley McCusker / (Canada) Ana Padurariu; Senior/Junior FX: (Brazil) Flavia Saraiva & Abby Paulson / Emma Malabuyo |
| March 30 – April 2 | (Ukraine) Kyiv | Stella Zakharova Cup | Senior/Junior AA: (Ukraine) Yana Fedorova / (Ukraine) Anastasiya Bachynska; Senior/Junior VT: (Ukraine) Yana Fedorova / (Ukraine) Anastasiya Bachynska; Senior/Junior UB: (Poland) Gabriela Janik / (Ukraine) Anastasiya Bachynska; Senior/Junior BB: (Belarus) Hanna Traukova / (Ukraine) Anastasiya Bachynska; Senior/Junior FX: (Ukraine) Yana Fedorova / (Ukraine) Anastasiya Bachynska |
| April 7–9 | (Spain) Guadalajara | Mediterranean Junior Championships | TF: (Italy) Italy; AA: (Italy) Elisa Iorio; VT: (Italy) Elisa Iorio; UB: (Spain) Violeta Sanchez; BB: (France) Eva Meder; FX: (Spain) Andrea Carmona & (Italy) Alice D’Amato |
| April 8 | (United Kingdom) London | London World Cup | AA: (Germany) Tabea Alt |
| April 19–23 | (Romania) Cluj | European Championships | AA: (United Kingdom) Ellie Downie; VT: (France) Coline Devillard; UB: (Belgium) Nina Derwael; BB: (Romania) Cătălina Ponor; FX: (Russia) Angelina Melnikova |
| May 12–14 | (Slovenia) Koper | Koper World Challenge Cup | VT: (Brazil) Rebeca Andrade; UB: (Romania) Larisa Iordache; BB: (Romania) Larisa Iordache; FX: (Germany) Carina Kröll |
| May 13–15 | (Azerbaijan) Baku | Islamic Solidarity Games | TF: Azerbaijan; AA: YuliIa Inshina; VT: (Uzbekistan) Oksana Chusovitina; UB: (Turkey) Demet Mutlu; BB: (Turkey) Göksu Üçtaş; FX: YuliIa Inshina |
| May 16–21 | (Thailand) Bangkok | Asian Championships | Senior/Junior TF: China / China; Senior/Junior AA: Liu Tingting / Chen Yile; Senior/Junior VT: Liu Jinru / Liu Jieyu; Senior/Junior UB: Luo Huan / Chen Yile; Senior/Junior BB: Liu Tingting / Li Qi; Senior/Junior FX: (Japan) Honoka Koga & (North Korea) Kim Su Jong / (China) Li Qi |
| May 18–21 | (Croatia) Osijek | Osijek World Challenge Cup | VT: (Hungary) Boglarka Devai; UB: (Russia) Anastasiia Iliankova; BB: (Brazil) Thais Fidelis; FX: (Brazil) Thais Fidelis |
| June 3–4 | (Slovakia) Trnava | Gym Festival Trnava | Senior/Junior AA: (Japan) Hitomi Hatakeda / (Ukraine) Anastasiia Bachynska; Senior/Junior VT: (Russia) Daria Elizarova / (Japan) Mana Oguchi; Senior/Junior UB: (Japan) Hitomi Hatakeda / (Hungary) Nóra Fehér; Senior/Junior BB: (Russia) Daria Elizarova / (Ukraine) Anastasiia Bachynska; Senior/Junior FX: (Japan) Nozomi Toyoda / (Japan) Mana Oguchi |
| June 10–11 | (Belgium) Ghent | FIT Challenge | Senior/ Junior TF: Italy / Italy; Senior/Junior AA: (Belgium) Rune Hermans / Sydney Saturnino |
| June 29–30 | Guatemala City | Central American Sports Festival | Senior/Junior AA: (Cuba) Yesenia Ferrera / (Mexico) Louise Lopez |
| July 4–18 | (Israel) Jerusalem | Maccabiah Games | Senior/Junior AA: (Israel) Ofir Kremer / (Israel) Andy Turiski |
| July 22–30 | (Hungary) Győr | European Youth Olympic Festival | TF: (Russia) Russia; AA: (Russia) Ksenia Klimenko; VT: (Russia) Valeria Saifulina; UB: (Italy) Elisa Iorio; BB: (Russia) Ksenia Klimenko; FX: (Russia) Ksenia Klimenko |
| August 10–12 | (Peru) Lima | Pan American Championships | VT: (Mexico) Ahtziri Sandoval; UB: (Canada) Jade Chrobok; BB: (Canada) Sophie Marois; FX: (Canada) Brooklyn Moors |
| August 14–30 | (Malaysia) Kuala Lumpur | Southeast Asian Games | TF: (Malaysia) Malaysia; VT: (Malaysia) Tan Ing Yueh; UB: (Philippines) Kaitlin DeGuzman; BB: (Indonesia) Rifda Irfanaluthfi; FX: (Malaysia) Farah Ann Abdul Hadi |
| August 19–29 | (Taiwan) Taipei City | Summer Universiade | TF: Russia; AA: (Romania) Larisa Iordache; VT: (Canada) Brittany Rogers; UB: Daria Spiridonova; BB: (Canada) Elsabeth Black; FX: (Romania) Larisa Iordache |
| September 1–3 | (Bulgaria) Varna | Varna World Challenge Cup | VT: (Brazil) Rebeca Andrade; UB: (Brazil) Rebeca Andrade; BB: (Brazil) Daniele Hypólito; FX: (Brazil) Thais Fidelis |
| September 8–10 | (Hungary) Szombathely | Szombathely World Challenge Cup | VT: (Azerbaijan) Marina Nekrasova; UB: (Sweden) Jonna Adlerteg; BB: (Romania) Cătălina Ponor; FX: (Canada) Brooklyn Moors |
| September 16–17 | (France) Paris | French International | VT: (France) Coline Devillard; UB: (Belgium) Nina Derwael; BB: (Romania) Larisa Iordache; FX: (United Kingdom) Claudia Fragapane |
| October 2–9 | (Canada) Montreal | World Championships | AA: (United States) Morgan Hurd; VT: (Russia) Maria Paseka; UB: (China) Fan Yilin; BB: (Germany) Pauline Schäfer; FX: (Japan) Mai Murakami |
| October 21–22 | Faroe Islands | Northern European Championships | TF: (Norway) Norway; AA: (Norway) Martine Skregelid; VT: (Sweden) Marcela Torres; UB: (Finland) Helmi Murto; BB: (Norway) Martine Skregelid; FX: (Denmark) Camille Rasmussen |
| November 11–17 | (Colombia) Santa Marta | Bolivarian Games | TF: (Colombia) Colombia; AA: (Colombia) Ginna Escobar; VT: (Dominican Republic) Yamilet Peña; UB: (Colombia) Yurany Avendaño; BB: (Colombia) Marcela Sandoval; FX: (Venezuela) Pamela Arriojas |
| November 23–26 | (Germany) Cottbus | Cottbus Cup | VT: (Uzbekistan) Oksana Chusovitina; UB: (Germany) Elisabeth Seitz; BB: (China) Wang Cenyu; FX: (Russia) Lilia Akhaimova |
| November 27–December 4 | (Bolivia) Cochabamba | South American Championships | TF: (Brazil) Brazil; AA: (Brazil) Lorrane Oliveira; VT: (Brazil) Carolyne Pedro; UB: (Brazil) Lorrane Oliveira; BB: (Argentina) Agustina Pisos; FX: (Argentina) Ayelén Tarabini |

=== National level ===
| Date | Location | Event | Winner(s) |
|---|---|---|---|
| January 14–15 | (Hong Kong) Ma On Shan | Hong Kong Open Championships | Senior/Junior AA: Ng Tsz Ching / Sy Wing Yu |
| March 1–5 | (Russia) Kazan | Russian Championships | TF:Moscow; AA: Natalia Kapitonova; VT: Seda Tutkhalyan; UB: Daria Spiridonova & Natalia Kapitonova; BB: Viktoria Trykina & Seda Tutkhalyan; FX: Lilia Akhaimova |
| March 3–5 | (Turkey) Mersin | Turkish Championships | Senior/Junior AA: Ekin Morova / Sinem Nur Toyran |
| March 4–5 | (Scotland) Perth | Scottish Championships | Senior/Junior AA: Shannon Archer / Ellie Russell; Senior/Junior VT: Shannon Archer / Ellie Breadner; Senior/Junior UB: Isabella Tolometti / Kacey Morrison; Senior/Junior BB: Shannon Archer / Kacey Morrison; Senior/Junior FX: Shannon Archer / Megan Morrison |
| March 4–5 | (Greece) Thessaloniki | Greek Championships | Senior/Junior AA: Argyro Afrati / Elvira Katsari; Senior/Junior VT: Argyro Afrati / Evelina Magia; Senior/Junior UB: Argyro Afrati / Georgia Ananiadou; Senior/Junior BB: Argyro Afrati / Evelina Magia & Georgia Ananiadou; Senior/Junior FX: Ioanna Xoulogi / Georgia Ananiadou |
| March 11–15 | Singapore | Singapore Championships | Senior/Junior AA: Nadine Joy Nathan / Josephine Mei Ng; Senior/Junior VT: Kelsie Muir / Gemma Mollison; Senior/Junior UB: Colette Chan / Nydia Heng Han Xuan; Senior/Junior BB: Kelsie Muir / Lim Sze; Senior/Junior FX: Colette Chan / Lim Sze |
| March 24–26 | (United Kingdom) Liverpool | British Championships | Senior/Junior AA: Ellie Downie / Taeja James; Senior/Junior VT: Ellie Downie / Taeja James; Senior/Junior UB: Ellie Downie / Taeja James; Senior/Junior BB: Phoebe Turner / Amelie Morgan; Senior/Junior FX: Maisie Methuen / Taeja James |
| April 1–2 | (Denmark) Kastrup | Danish Championships | Senior/Junior AA: Mette Hulgaard / Camille Rasmussen; Senior/Junior VT: Ida Holst / Emilie Midtbøll; Senior/Junior UB: Victoria Gilberg & Tinna Odinsdottir / Isabella Bøckhaus; Senior/Junior BB: Victoria Gilberg / Camille Rasmussen; Senior/Junior FX: Victoria Gilberg / Camille Rasmussen |
| April 7–9 | (England) Loughborough | English Championships | Senior/Junior AA: Sophie Scott / Taeja James |
| April 7–9 | (Japan) Tokyo | Japanese Championships | AA: Mai Murakami |
| April 8–9 | (Iceland) Reykjavík | Icelandic Championships | Senior/Junior AA: Irina Sazonova / Sonja Ólafsdóttir |
| May 1 | (South Korea) Yanggu-eup | South Korean Championships | AA: Kim Ju Ru |
| May 5–7 | (Iceland) Kópavogur | GK Championships | Senior/Junior AA: Agnes Suto / Sonja Ólafsdóttir |
| May 6 | (Portugal) Lisbon | Portuguese Championships | Senior/Junior AA: Filipa Martins / Rafaela Ferreira |
| May 1–9 | (China) Wuhan | Chinese Championships | TF: Guangdong; AA: Luo Huan; VT: Liu Jinru; UB: Luo Huan; BB: Zhu Xiaofang; FX: Shang Chunsong |
| May 12–14 | (Finland) Jyväskylä | Finnish Championships | Senior/Junior AA: Maija Leinonen / Ada Hautala; Senior/Junior VT: Annika Urvikko / Sani Mäkelä; Senior/Junior UB: Maija Leinonen / Sani Mäkelä; Senior/Junior BB: Maija Leinonen / Iida-Maria Vänni; Senior/Junior FX: Annika Urvikko / Iida-Maria Vänni |
| May 12–14 | (Colombia) Cúcuta | Colombian Championships | Senior/Junior AA: Melba Avendaño / Nataly Rodriguez; Senior/Junior VT: Valentina Pardo & Yurany Avendaño / Sabrina Cortes; Senior/Junior UB: Ginna Escobar / Sabrina Cortes; Senior/Junior BB: Ginna Escobar / Sabrina Cortes; Senior/Junior FX: Melba Avendaño / Sabrina Cortes |
| May 13–14 | (Republic of Ireland) Dublin | Irish Championships | Senior/Junior AA: Meaghan Smith / Meg Ryan |
| May 20 – June 3 | (Australia) Melbourne | Australian Championships | AA: Emily Little; VT: Emily Little; UB: Rianna Mizzen; BB: Georgia-Rose Brown; FX: Georgia-Rose Brown |
| May 23–28 | (Canada) Montreal | Canadian Championships | Senior/Junior AA: Ellie Black / Ana Pădurariu |
| May 27–28 | (Belgium) Libramont | Belgian Championships | Senior/Junior AA: Rune Hermans / Julie Vandamme |
| May 27–28 | (France) Ponts de Cé | French Championships | Senior/Junior AA: Mélanie De Jesus Dos Santos / Célia Serber; VT: Célia Serber; UB: Lorette Charpy; BB: Marine Boyer; FX: Marine Boyer |
| May 29–June 3 | (Mexico) Guadalajara | Mexican Championships | Senior/Junior AA: Nicolle Castro / Anapaula Gutierrez; Senior/Junior VT: Nicolle Castro / Louise Lopez; Senior/Junior UB: Ahtziri Sandoval / Natalia Escalera; Senior/Junior BB: Nicolle Castro / Anapaula Gutierrez; Senior/Junior FX: Nicolle Castro / Louise Lopez |
| June 3–8 | (Germany) Berlin | German Championships | AA: Elisabeth Seitz; VT: Pauline Tratz; UB: Elisabeth Seitz; BB: Elisabeth Seitz; FX: Pauline Schäfer |
| June 10–11 | (Czech Republic) Ostrava | Czech Championships | Senior/Junior AA: Veronika Cenkova / Dominika Ponizilova; Senior/Junior VT: Karolina Bartunkova / Dominika Ponizilova; Senior/Junior UB: Veronika Cenkova / Kristyna Brabcova; Senior/Junior BB: Veronika Cenkova / Kristyna Brabcova; Senior/Junior FX: Veronika Cenkova / Dominika Ponizilova |
| June 17–18 | (Netherlands) Rotterdam | Dutch Championships | Senior/Junior AA: Tisha Volleman / Astrid de Zeeuw; Senior VT: Tisha Volleman / Astrid de Zeeuw; Senior UB: Naomi Visser / Laura de Witt; Senior BB: Tisha Volleman / Sara van Disseldorp; Senior FX: Tisha Volleman / Sara van Disseldorp |
| June 24–25 | (Norway) Rogaland | Norwegian Championships | AA: Martine Skregelid & Thea Nygård; VT: Martine Skregelid; UB: Martine Skregelid; BB: Martine Skregelid; FX: Thea Nygård |
| June 28-July 1 | (Argentina) San Jorge | Argentinian Championships | Senior/Junior AA: Ayelen Tarabini / Martina Dominici |
| July 1–2 | (Sweden) Boras | Swedish Championships | Senior/Junior AA: Marcela Torres / Ida Staafgård; Senior/Junior VT: Hilda Martinsdottir / Jessica Castles; Senior/Junior UB: Marcela Torres / Tonya Paulsson & Emilia Schmeckel; Senior/Junior BB: Marcela Torres / Ida Staafgård; Senior/Junior FX: Sigrid Risberg / Jessica Castles |
| July 10–16 | (Spain) Madrid | Spanish Championships | Senior/Junior AA: Ana Perez / Emma Fernandez |
| July 27–29 | (United States) Hoffman Estates, Illinois | U.S. Classic | Senior/Junior AA: Alyona Shchennikova / Emma Malabuyo |
| August 3–6 | (Brazil) São Paulo | Brazilian Championships | Senior/Junior AA: Thais Fidelis / Fabiane Valentim |
| August 17–20 | (United States) Anaheim | U.S. Nationals | Senior/Junior AA: Ragan Smith / Maile O’Keefe |
| August 21–27 | (Russia) Yekaterinburg | Russian Cup | AA: Angelina Melnikova; VT: Eleonora Afanasyeva; UB: Anastasia Iliankova; BB: Angelina Melnikova; FX: Maria Kharenkova |
| August 31-September 7 | (China) Tianjin | Chinese National Games | |
| September 1–3 | (Romania) Ploiești | Romanian Championships | AA: Larisa Iordache; VT: Denisa Golgotă; UB: Larisa Iordache; BB: Larisa Iordache; FX: Larisa Iordache |
| September 1–3 | (Hungary) Budapest | Hungarian Championships | Senior/Junior AA: Dália Al-Salty / Nóra Fehér |
| September 2–3 | (Italy) Perugia | Italian Championships | AA: Elisa Iorio; VT: Asia D’Amato; UB: Giorgia Villa; BB: Sara Berardinelli; FX: Lara Mori |
| September 2–3 | (Switzerland) Bülach | Swiss Championships | AA: Giulia Steingruber; VT: Giulia Steingruber; UB: Fabienne Studer; BB: Céline Sidler; FX: Anina Wildi |
| September 14–16 | (South Africa) Eldoraigne | South African Championships | Senior/Junior AA: Naveen Daries / Lisa Conradie |
| October 17–24 | (China) | Chinese Individual Championships | |

== International medalists ==
=== Major competitions ===
==== International championships ====
| Competition | Event | Gold | Silver | Bronze |
| World Championships | All-Around | (United States) Morgan Hurd | (Canada) Ellie Black | (Russia) Elena Eremina |
| World Championships | Vault | (Russia) Maria Paseka | (United States) Jade Carey | (Switzerland) Giulia Steingruber |
| World Championships | Uneven Bars | (China) Fan Yilin | (Russia) Elena Eremina | (Belgium) Nina Derwael |
| World Championships | Balance Beam | (Germany) Pauline Schäfer | (United States) Morgan Hurd | (Germany) Tabea Alt |
| World Championships | Floor Exercise | (Japan) Mai Murakami | (United States) Jade Carey | (United Kingdom) Claudia Fragapane |

==== Continental championships ====
| Competition | Event | Gold | Silver | Bronze |
| European | All-Around | (United Kingdom) Ellie Downie | (Hungary) Zsófia Kovács | (France) Mélanie dos Santos |
| European | Vault | (France) Coline Devillard | (United Kingdom) Ellie Downie | (Hungary) Boglárka Dévai |
| European | Uneven Bars | (Belgium) Nina Derwael | (Russia) Elena Eremina | (United Kingdom) Ellie Downie (Germany) Elisabeth Seitz |
| European | Balance Beam | (Romania) Cătălina Ponor | (Netherlands) Eythora Thorsdottir | (Romania) Larisa Iordache |
| European | Floor Exercise | (Russia) Angelina Melnikova | (United Kingdom) Ellie Downie | (Netherlands) Eythora Thorsdottir |
| Asian | Team | China | North Korea | Japan |
| Asian | All-Around | (China) Liu Tingting | (China) Luo Huan | (North Korea) Kim Su Jong |
| Asian | Vault | (China) Liu Jinru | (North Korea) Kim Su Jong | (North Korea) Pyon Rye Yong |
| Asian | Uneven Bars | (China) Luo Huan | (China) Liu Tingting | (North Korea) Jon Jang Mi |
| Asian | Balance Beam | (China) Liu Tingting | (China) Luo Huan | (Chinese Taipei) Lai Pin Ju |
| Asian | Floor Exercise | (Japan) Honoka Koga (North Korea) Kim Su Jong | — | (South Korea) Lee Eun Ju |
| Pan American | Vault | (Mexico) Ahtziri Sandoval | (Canada) Brooklyn Moors | (Colombia) Dayana Ardila |
| Pan American | Uneven Bars | (Canada) Jade Chrobok | (Mexico) Ahtziri Sandoval | (Canada) Brooklyn Moors |
| Pan American | Balance Beam | (Canada) Sophie Marois | (Argentina) Agustina Pisos | (Brazil) Carolyne Pedro |
| Pan American | Floor Exercise | (Canada) Brooklyn Moors | (Canada) Laurie Denommee | (Mexico) Miriana Almeida |
| South American | Team | Brazil | Argentina | Bolivia |
| South American | All-Around | (Brazil) Lorraine Oliveira | (Argentina) Camila Bonzo | (Argentina) Agustina Pisos |
| South American | Vault | (Brazil) Carolyne Pedro | (Argentina) Ayelen Tarabini | (Ecuador) Denisse Grijalva |
| South American | Uneven Bars | (Brazil) Lorraine Oliveira | (Argentina) Agustina Pisos | (Argentina) Camila Bonzo |
| South American | Balance Beam | (Argentina) Agustina Pisos | (Argentina) Ayelen Tarabini | (Peru) Venere Horna |
| South American | Floor Exercise | (Argentina) Ayelen Tarabini | (Brazil) Carolyne Pedro | (Brazil) Maria Franca |

==== World Cup ====
| Competition | Event | Gold | Silver | Bronze |
| Melbourne World Cup | Vault | (China) Wang Yan | (Australia) Emily Little | (Australia) Naomi Lee |
| Melbourne World Cup | Uneven Bars | (China) Liu Tingting | (China) Luo Huan | (Australia) Rianna Mizzen |
| Melbourne World Cup | Balance Beam | (China) Liu Tingting | (Netherlands) Sanne Wevers | (Australia) Emily Little |
| Melbourne World Cup | Floor Exercise | (Australia) Emily Little | (Australia) Georgia Godwin | (China) Liu Tingting |
| AT&T American Cup | All-Around | (United States) Ragan Smith | (Japan) Asuka Teramoto | (France) Melanie dos Santos |
| Baku World Cup | Vault | (Uzbekistan) Oksana Chusovitina | (Australia) Emily Little | (Slovenia) Teja Belak |
| Baku World Cup | Uneven Bars | (Ukraine) Diana Varinska | (Australia) Rianna Mizzen | (Australia) Georgia-Rose Brown |
| Baku World Cup | Balance Beam | (Romania) Cătălina Ponor | (Greece) Vasiliki Millousi | (Australia) Emily Little |
| Baku World Cup | Floor Exercise | (Romania) Cătălina Ponor | (Australia) Emily Little | (Azerbaijan) Marina Nekrasova |
| Stuttgart World Cup | All-Around | (Germany) Tabea Alt | (Russia) Angelina Melnikova | (United States) Morgan Hurd |
| Doha World Cup | Vault | (Uzbekistan) Oksana Chusovitina | (Australia) Emily Little | (Slovenia) Teja Belak |
| Doha World Cup | Uneven Bars | (China) Luo Huan | (Hungary) Zsófia Kovács | (Australia) Georgia-Rose Brown |
| Doha World Cup | Balance Beam | (China) Liu Tingting | (Romania) Cătălina Ponor | (China) Luo Huan |
| Doha World Cup | Floor Exercise | (China) Liu Tingting | (Australia) Emily Little | (Croatia) Ana Derek |
| London World Cup | All-Around | (Germany) Tabea Alt | (United States) Victoria Nguyen | (United Kingdom) Amy Tinkler |
| Koper World Challenge Cup | Vault | (Brazil) Rebeca Andrade | (Hungary) Boglarka Devai | (Slovenia) Teja Belak |
| Koper World Challenge Cup | Uneven Bars | (Romania) Larisa Iordache | (Canada) Ellie Black | (Brazil) Flavia Saraiva |
| Koper World Challenge Cup | Balance Beam | (Romania) Larisa Iordache | (Canada) Ellie Black | (Brazil) Thais Fidelis |
| Koper World Challenge Cup | Floor Exercise | (Germany) Carina Kröll | (Canada) Ellie Black | (Slovakia) Barbora Mokosova |
| Osijek World Challenge Cup | Vault | (Hungary) Boglarka Devai | (Hungary) Zsófia Kovács | (Slovenia) Tjaša Kysselef |
| Osijek World Challenge Cup | Uneven Bars | (Russia) Anastasiia Iliankova | (Hungary) Zsófia Kovács | (Poland) Gabriela Janik |
| Osijek World Challenge Cup | Balance Beam | (Brazil) Thais Fidelis | (Russia) Anastasiia Iliankova | (Brazil) Flavia Saraiva |
| Osijek World Challenge Cup | Floor Exercise | (Brazil) Thais Fidelis | (Brazil) Flavia Saraiva | (Russia) Lilia Akhaimova |
| Varna World Challenge Cup | Vault | (Brazil) Rebeca Andrade | (Canada) Shallon Olsen | (Slovenia) Teja Belak |
| Varna World Challenge Cup | Uneven Bars | (Brazil) Rebeca Andrade | (Egypt) Farah Hussein | (Brazil) Thais Fidelis |
| Varna World Challenge Cup | Balance Beam | (Brazil) Daniele Hypólito | (United Kingdom) Georgia-Mae Fenton | (Bulgaria) Pamela Georgieva |
| Varna World Challenge Cup | Floor Exercise | (Brazil) Thais Fidelis | (Canada) Shallon Olsen | (Egypt) Farah Hussein |
| Szombathely World Challenge Cup | Vault | (Azerbaijan) Marina Nekrasova | (Hungary) Boglárka Dévai | (Canada) Brooklyn Moors |
| Szombathely World Challenge Cup | Uneven Bars | (Sweden) Jonna Adlerteg | (Hungary) Zsófia Kovács | (Canada) Rose-Kaying Woo |
| Szombathely World Challenge Cup | Balance Beam | (Romania) Cătălina Ponor | (Hungary) Zsófia Kovács | (Ukraine) Valeria Iarmolenko |
| Szombathely World Challenge Cup | Floor Exercise | (Canada) Brooklyn Moors | (Romania) Cătălina Ponor | (United Kingdom) Amy Tinkler |
| French International | Vault | (France) Coline Devillard | (Hungary) Boglárka Dévai | (Germany) Michelle Timm |
| French International | Uneven Bars | (Belgium) Nina Derwael | (France) Melanie dos Santos | (Ukraine) Diana Varinska |
| French International | Balance Beam | (Romania) Larisa Iordache | (France) Marine Boyer | (United Kingdom) Claudia Fragapane |
| French International | Floor Exercise | (United Kingdom) Claudia Fragapane | (Romania) Larisa Iordache | (Ukraine) Diana Varinska |
| Cottbus Cup | Vault | (Uzbekistan) Oksana Chusovitina | (Russia) Lilia Akhaimova | (Slovenia) Tjaša Kysselef |
| Cottbus Cup | Uneven Bars | (Germany) Elisabeth Seitz | (China) Lyu Jiaqi | (China) Wang Cenyu |
| Cottbus Cup | Balance Beam | (China) Wang Cenyu | (Germany) Pauline Schäfer | (Russia) Maria Kharenkova |
| Cottbus Cup | Floor Exercise | (Russia) Lilia Akhaimova | (Russia) Maria Kharenkova | (Germany) Pauline Schäfer |

== Season's best international scores ==
Note: Only the scores of gymnasts from international events have been included below. Finalists at the 2017 World Championships are highlighted in green.

=== Seniors ===
==== All-around ====
| Rank | Name | Country | Score | Event |
|---|---|---|---|---|
| 1 | Liu Tingting | China | 56.800 | Asian Championships QF/TF |
| 2 | Larisa Iordache | Romania | 56.750 | Summer Universiade AA |
| 3 | Riley McCusker | United States | 56.600 | City of Jesolo Trophy TF |
| 4 | Eythora Thorsdottir | Netherlands | 56.350 | Reykjavik International Games |
| 5 | Ellie Downie | United Kingdom | 56.198 | European Championships QF |
| 6 | Ragan Smith | United States | 56.099 | American Cup |
| 7 | Ellie Black | Canada | 56.050 | Summer Universiade QF/TF |
| 8 | Rebeca Andrade | Brazil | 56.000 | City of Jesolo Trophy TF |
| 9 | Mai Murakami | Japan | 55.933 | World Championships QF |
| 10 | Abby Paulson | United States | 55.800 | City of Jesolo Trophy TF |
| 11 | Elena Eremina | Russia | 55.750 | City of Jesolo Trophy TF |
| 12 | Luo Huan | China | 55.700 | Asian Championships QF/TF |
| 13 | Asuka Teramoto | Japan | 55.650 | Summer Universiade AA |
| 14 | Zsófia Kovács | Hungary | 55.432 | European Championships AA |
| 15 | Flávia Saraiva | Brazil | 55.400 | City of Jesolo Trophy TF |
| 16 | Mélanie de Jesus dos Santos | France | 55.299 | World Championships QF |
| 17 | Hitomi Hatakeda | Japan | 55.100 | Gym Festival AA |
| 18 | Tabea Alt | Germany | 54.866 | European Championships QF |
| 19 | Morgan Hurd | United States | 54.832 | World Championships QF |
| 20 | Angelina Melnikova | Russia | 54.800 | City of Jesolo Trophy TF |

==== Vault ====
| Rank | Name | Country | Score | Event |
|---|---|---|---|---|
| 1 | Maria Paseka | Russia | 14.933 | World Championships QF |
| 2 | Jade Carey | United States | 14.849 | World Championships QF |
| 3 | Rebeca Andrade | Brazil | 14.800 | Varna World Challenge Cup EF |
| 4 | Giulia Steingruber | Switzerland | 14.750 | World Championships QF |
| 5 | Shallon Olsen | Canada | 14.649 | World Championships QF |
| 6 | Liu Jinru | China | 14.625 | Asian Championships QF/TF |
| 7 | Wang Yan | China | 14.566 | Doha World Cup QF |
| 8 | Ellie Black | Canada | 14.525 | Summer Universiade QF/TF |
| 9 | Sae Miyakawa | Japan | 14.516 | World Championships QF |
| 10 | Oksana Chusovitina | Uzbekistan | 14.475 | International Gymnix EF |
| 11 | Coline Devillard | France | 14.467 | European Championships EF |
| 12 | Ellie Downie | United Kingdom | 14.433 | European Championships QF |
| 13 | Boglárka Dévai | Hungary | 14.317 | European Championships EF |
| 14 | Brittany Rogers | Canada | 14.275 | Summer Universiade QF/TF |
| 15 | Tisha Volleman | Netherlands | 14.250 | European Championships EF |
| 16 | Angelina Melnikova | Russia | 14.225 | City of Jesolo Trophy TF |
| 17 | Zsófia Kovács | Hungary | 14.200 | European Championships EF |
| 18 | Emily Little | Australia | 14.199 | Melbourne World Cup EF |
| 19 | Teja Belak | Slovenia | 14.183 | European Championships EF |
| 20 | Sofia Busato | Italy | 14.175 | City of Jesolo Trophy EF |

==== Uneven bars ====
| Rank | Name | Country | Score | Event |
|---|---|---|---|---|
| 1 | Fan Yilin | China | 15.166 | World Championships EF |
| 2 | Elena Eremina | Russia | 15.100 | World Championships QF |
| 3 | Anastasia Ilyankova | Russia | 15.066 | World Championships QF |
| 4 | Riley McCusker | United States | 15.050 | City of Jesolo Trophy TF |
| 5 | Nina Derwael | Belgium | 15.033 | World Championships EF |
| 6 | Angelina Melnikova | Russia | 14.966 | World Championships QF |
| 7 | Elisabeth Seitz | Germany | 14.766 | World Championships EF |
| 8 | Ashton Locklear | United States | 14.750 | City of Jesolo Trophy TF |
| 9 | Diana Varinska | Ukraine | 14.583 | World Championships EF |
| 10 | Luo Huan | China | 14.566 | World Championships QF |
| 11 | Kim Bùi | Germany | 14.550 | American Cup |
| 12 | Georgia-Mae Fenton | Great Britain | 14.533 | World Championships QF |
| 13 | Mélanie de Jesus dos Santos | France | 14.500 | World Championships QF |
| 14 | Daria Spiridonova | Russia | 14.450 | Summer Universiade AA |
| 14 | Rebeca Andrade | Brazil | 14.450 | Varna Challenge Cup QF |
| 16 | Becky Downie | United Kingdom | 14.433 | European Championships QF |
| 17 | Ragan Smith | United States | 14.400 | American Cup |
| 17 | Polina Shchennikova | United States | 14.400 | City of Jesolo Trophy TF |
| 17 | Ellie Black | Canada | 14.400 | World Championships QF |
| 20 | Liu Tingting | China | 14.366 | Doha World Cup QF |

==== Balance beam ====
| Rank | Name | Country | Score | Event |
|---|---|---|---|---|
| 1 | Liu Tingting | China | 15.300 | Asian Championships QF/TF |
| 2 | Larisa Iordache | Romania | 15.000 | Paris Challenge Cup QF |
| 3 | Eythora Thorsdottir | Netherlands | 14.850 | Reykjavik International Games |
| 4 | Luo Huan | China | 14.750 | Asian Championships QF/TF |
| 5 | Cătălina Ponor | Romania | 14.566 | European Championships EF |
| 6 | Sanne Wevers | Netherlands | 14.500 | Melbourne World Cup EF |
| 7 | Laurie-Lou Vezina | Canada | 14.400 | Nadia Comăneci Invitational |
| 7 | Ellie Black | Canada | 14.400 | Summer Universiade QF/TF |
| 9 | Mélanie de Jesus dos Santos | France | 14.233 | American Cup |
| 10 | Luisa Blanco | United States | 14.250 | WOGA Classic |
| 10 | Victoria Nguyen | United States | 14.250 | City of Jesolo Trophy TF |
| 10 | Marine Boyer | France | 14.250 | Paris Challenge Cup QF |
| 13 | Riley McCusker | United States | 14.200 | City of Jesolo Trophy TF |
| 13 | Abby Paulson | United States | 14.200 | City of Jesolo Trophy TF |
| 15 | Flavia Saraiva | Brazil | 14.100 | City of Jesolo Trophy EF |
| 16 | Tabea Alt | Germany | 14.066 | Stuttgart World Cup |
| 17 | Angelina Melnikova | Russia | 14.050 | City of Jesolo Trophy TF |
| 18 | Ashton Locklear | United States | 14.000 | City of Jesolo Trophy TF |
| 18 | Thais Fidelis | Brazil | 14.000 | Varna World Challenge Cup QF |
| 20 | Nina Derwael | Belgium | 13.900 | FIT Challenge TF |

==== Floor exercise ====
| Rank | Name | Country | Score | Event |
|---|---|---|---|---|
| 1 | Ragan Smith | United States | 14.433 | World Championships QF |
| 2 | Mai Murakami | Japan | 14.233 | World Championships AA |
| 3 | Jade Carey | United States | 14.200 | World Championships EF |
| 4 | Angelina Melnikova | Russia | 14.100 | European Championships EF |
| 5 | Ellie Downie | United Kingdom | 14.066 | European Championships EF |
| 6 | Larisa Iordache | Romania | 14.050 | Summer Universiade AA |
| 7 | Eythora Thorsdottir | Netherlands | 14.000 | Reykjavik International Games |
| 8 | Claudia Fragapane | United Kingdom | 13.933 | World Championships QF |
| 9 | Thais Fidelis | Brazil | 13.900 | Varna Challenge Cup QF |
| 9 | Abby Paulson | United States | 13.900 | City of Jesolo Trophy EF |
| 9 | Flavia Saraiva | Brazil | 13.900 | City of Jesolo Trophy EF |
| 12 | Brooklyn Moors | Canada | 13.866 | World Championships QF |
| 13 | Daria Elizarova | Russia | 13.850 | Summer Universiade QF/TF |
| 14 | Rebeca Andrade | Brazil | 13.650 | City of Jesolo Trophy TF |
| 15 | Elena Eremina | Russia | 13.633 | European Championships QF |
| 16 | Lilia Akhaimova | Russia | 13.600 | Summer Universiade QF/TF |
| 16 | Desiree Carofiglio | Italy | 13.600 | FIT Challenge TF |
| 16 | Vanessa Ferrari | Italy | 13.600 | World Championships QF |
| 16 | Hitomi Hatakeda | Japan | 13.600 | International Gymnix EF |
| 20 | Megan Roberts | Canada | 13.567 | International Gymnix EF |

=== Juniors ===
==== All-around ====
| Rank | Name | Country | Score | Event |
|---|---|---|---|---|
| 1 | Gabby Perea | United States | 57.225 | City of Jesolo Trophy AA |
| 2 | Maile O'Keefe | United States | 56.900 | City of Jesolo Trophy AA |
| 3 | Emma Malabuyo | United States | 56.275 | City of Jesolo Trophy AA |
| 4 | Adeline Kenlin | United States | 55.900 | City of Jesolo Trophy AA |
| 5 | Ana Padurariu | Canada | 55.750 | City of Jesolo Trophy AA |
| 6 | Giorgia Villa | Italy | 55.502 | International Gymnix AA |
| 7 | Chen Yile | China | 55.000 | Asian Junior Championships AA |
| 8 | Ksenia Klimenko | Russia | 54.450 | European Youth Olympic Festival AA |
| 9 | Anastasia Bachynska | Ukraine | 54.117 | Gym Festival Trnava AA |
| 10 | Angelina Simakova | Russia | 54.100 | Junior Japan International AA |

==== Vault ====
| Rank | Name | Country | Score | Event |
|---|---|---|---|---|
| 1 | Angelina Simakova | Russia | 14.433 | Junior Japan International EF |
| 2 | Emma Malabuyo | United States | 14.388 | International Gymnix EF |
| 3 | Gabby Perea | United States | 14.325 | City of Jesolo Trophy EF |
| 4 | Maile O'Keefe | United States | 14.183 | Junior Japan International EF |
| 5 | Valeria Saifulina | Russia | 14.149 | European Youth Olympic Festival EF |
| 6 | Ayaka Sakaguchi | Japan | 14.099 | Junior Japan International EF |
| 7 | Denisa Golgotă | Romania | 14.033 | European Youth Olympic Festival EF |
| 8 | Asia D’Amato | Italy | 14.016 | European Youth Olympic Festival EF |
| 9 | Ana Padurariu | Canada | 13.975 | City of Jesolo Trophy EF |
| 10 | Giorgia Villa | Italy | 13.925 | International Gymnix EF |

==== Uneven bars ====
| Rank | Name | Country | Score | Event |
|---|---|---|---|---|
| 1 | Gabby Perea | United States | 15.050 | City of Jesolo Trophy AA |
| 2 | Maile O'Keefe | United States | 14.650 | City of Jesolo Trophy AA |
| 2 | Elisa Iorio | Italy | 14.650 | City of Jesolo Trophy EF |
| 4 | Adeline Kenlin | United States | 14.250 | City of Jesolo Trophy AA |
| 5 | Chen Yile | China | 14.166 | Junior Japan International EF |
| 5 | Ksenia Klimenko | Russia | 14.150 | European Youth Olympic Festival AA |
| 7 | Ana Padurariu | Canada | 14.134 | International Gymnix AA |
| 8 | Sunisa Lee | United States | 14.125 | International Gymnix EF |
| 9 | Emma Malabuyo | United States | 14.000 | City of Jesolo Trophy AA |
| 10 | Angelina Simakova | Russia | 13.900 | Junior Japan International AA |

==== Balance beam ====
| Rank | Name | Country | Score | Event |
|---|---|---|---|---|
| 1 | Li Qi | China | 15.250 | Junior Japan International AA |
| 2 | Gabby Perea | United States | 14.650 | City of Jesolo Trophy AA |
| 3 | Maile O'Keefe | United States | 14.600 | International Gymnix AA |
| 4 | Chen Yile | China | 14.550 | Junior Japan International AA |
| 5 | Ana Padurariu | Canada | 14.500 | City of Jesolo Trophy AA |
| 6 | Emma Malabuyo | United States | 14.333 | Junior Japan International EF |
| 7 | Adeline Kenlin | United States | 14.150 | City of Jesolo Trophy AA |
| 8 | Fabiane Valentin | Brazil | 14.200 | South American Junior Championships EF |
| 9 | Laura Iacob | Romania | 14.100 | Nadia Comăneci Invitational |
| 10 | Ksenia Klimenko | Russia | 14.050 | European Youth Olympic Festival AA |
| 10 | Varvara Zubova | Russia | 14.050 | European Youth Olympic Festival AA |

==== Floor ====
| Rank | Name | Country | Score | Event |
|---|---|---|---|---|
| 1 | Emma Malabuyo | United States | 14.100 | City of Jesolo Trophy EF |
| 2 | Mana Oguchi | Japan | 13.900 | Gym Festival Trnava EF |
| 3 | Maile O'Keefe | United States | 13.800 | International Gymnix AA |
| 3 | Gabby Perea | United States | 13.800 | International Gymnix AA |
| 5 | Nóra Fehér | Hungary | 13.733 | Gym Festival Trnava AA |
| 6 | Anastasia Bachynska | Ukraine | 13.625 | Stella Zakharova Cup EF |
| 7 | Ana Padurariu | Canada | 13.600 | International Gymnix AA |
| 7 | Carolann Heduit | France | 13.600 | International Gymnix AA |
| 9 | Giorgia Villa | Italy | 13.567 | International Gymnix AA |
| 10 | Li Qi | China | 13.533 | Junior Japan International EF |
| 10 | Chiaki Hatakeda | Japan | 13.533 | Junior Japan International EF |
