= Shiho Nakaji =

Japanese artistic gymnast

- Born: 15 April 2000 (age 26) Kyoto, Japan
- Height: 158 cm (5 ft 2 in)

Gymnastics career
- Discipline: Women's artistic gymnastics
- Country represented: Japan
- Club: Toda City Sports Center
- Head coach: Risa Sugawara
Medal record
Representing Japan
Asian Games
| Bronze medal – third place | 2018 Jakarta | Team |
| Bronze medal – third place | 2018 Jakarta | Floor exercise |

Shiho Nakaji (中路紫帆, Nakaji Shiho; born 15 April 2000) is a Japanese artistic gymnast. At the 2018 Asian Games, she won bronze medals in the team event and on the floor exercise.

== Gymnastics career ==
Nakaji moved from Kyoto to Saitama to train at the Toda City Sports Center under coach Risa Sugawara. She became age-eligible for senior competitions in 2016. She finished 12th in the all-around at both the 2016 All-Japan Championships and NHK Trophy.

Nakaji competed at the 2017 WOGA Classic in Frisco, Texas, and finished 11th in the all-around. She finished fourth in the all-around at the 2017 All-Japan Championships and had the second-highest score on the balance beam, behind Mai Murakami. Then at the 2017 NHK Trophy, she finished fifth in the all-around She placed seventh on the balance beam and sixth on the floor exercise at the All-Japan Event Championships. She was not selected to compete at the 2017 World Championships.

Nakaji finished eighth in the all-around at the 2018 All-Japan Championships and placed third on the balance beam behind Murakami and Asuka Teramoto. She also finished eighth at the NHK Trophy. She represented Japan at the 2018 Asian Games and helped her team win a bronze medal in the team event behind China and North Korea. She finished sixth in the all-around, the highest finisher from Japan, with a total score of 51.250. She qualified for the balance beam final and finished in fourth place. Then in the floor exercise final, she won the bronze medal behind Kim Su-jong and Rifda Irfanaluthfi.

Nakaji finished 22nd in the all-around at the 2019 All-Japan Championships. She then finished 18th at the NHK Trophy. She has not competed since 2019.
