= Diving at the 2018 Asian Games – Women's 10 metre platform =

Women's 10 metre platform at the 2018 Asian Games
- Venue: Gelora Bung Karno Aquatic Stadium
- Date: 30 August 2018
- Competitors: 12 from 8 nations

Medalists
gold medal	Si Yajie	China
silver medal	Zhang Jiaqi	China
bronze medal	Kim Mi-rae	North Korea

The women's 10 metre platform competition at the 2018 Asian Games took place on 30 August 2018 at the Gelora Bung Karno Aquatic Stadium.

== Schedule ==
All times are Western Indonesia Time (UTC+07:00)

Date	Time	Event
Thursday, 30 August 2018	12:10	Preliminary
Thursday, 30 August 2018	19:15	Final

== Results ==
=== Preliminary ===
Rank	Athlete	Dive					Total
Rank	Athlete	1	2	3	4	5	Total
1	Zhang Jiaqi (CHN)	72.00	75.20	72.60	80.00	81.60	381.40
2	Si Yajie (CHN)	73.50	81.60	70.40	74.25	78.40	378.15
3	Kim Kuk-hyang (PRK)	78.00	67.20	51.20	68.15	76.80	341.35
4	Kim Mi-rae (PRK)	75.00	72.00	67.20	37.95	72.00	324.15
5	Matsuri Arai (JPN)	63.00	60.00	55.10	67.20	68.80	314.10
6	Pandelela Rinong (MAS)	51.00	69.60	56.00	57.60	43.20	277.40
7	Moon Na-yun (KOR)	57.40	59.45	54.60	58.50	38.40	268.35
8	Cho Eun-bi (KOR)	54.60	66.00	34.80	44.55	52.20	252.15
9	Freida Lim (SGP)	63.00	33.00	63.80	35.00	43.20	238.00
10	Myra Lee (SGP)	46.20	51.00	36.25	39.90	52.80	226.15
11	Dewi Setyaningsih (INA)	43.50	36.40	38.40	39.15	53.20	210.65
12	Leong Sut In (MAC)	32.40	34.20	41.40	37.50	37.00	182.50

=== Final ===
Rank	Athlete	Dive					Total
Rank	Athlete	1	2	3	4	5	Total
1st place, gold medalist(s)	Si Yajie (CHN)	76.50	81.60	81.60	84.15	81.60	405.45
2nd place, silver medalist(s)	Zhang Jiaqi (CHN)	82.50	68.80	79.20	86.40	78.40	395.30
3rd place, bronze medalist(s)	Kim Mi-rae (PRK)	76.50	86.40	68.80	59.40	76.80	367.90
4	Kim Kuk-hyang (PRK)	75.00	81.60	65.60	65.25	80.00	367.45
5	Matsuri Arai (JPN)	67.20	75.00	65.25	67.20	67.20	341.85
6	Moon Na-yun (KOR)	63.00	58.00	63.00	57.00	59.20	300.20
7	Freida Lim (SGP)	64.40	61.50	36.25	58.80	62.40	283.35
8	Cho Eun-bi (KOR)	60.20	63.00	42.05	56.10	59.45	280.80
9	Myra Lee (SGP)	56.00	46.50	55.10	31.35	48.00	236.95
10	Leong Sut In (MAC)	32.40	34.20	37.95	37.50	36.00	178.05
11	Dewi Setyaningsih (INA)	31.50	46.80	35.20	33.35	25.20	172.05
