= North Korea at the 2018 Asian Games =

- IOC code: PRK
- NOC: Olympic Committee of the Democratic People's Republic of Korea

in Jakarta and Palembang August 18 – September 2
- Competitors: 167 in 17 sports
- Medals Ranked 10th: Gold 12 Silver 12 Bronze 13 Total 37

Asian Games appearances (overview)
- 1974; 1978; 1982; 1986; 1990; 1994; 1998; 2002; 2006; 2010; 2014; 2018; 2022; 2026

Korea DPR participated in the 2018 Asian Games in Jakarta and Palembang, Indonesia from 18 August to 2 September 2018. Korea DPR made its first appearance at the Asian Games in 1974 Tehran, and ranked at the top five in 1974, 1978, 1982, and 1990. At the latest games in Incheon, North Korea had collected 36 medals, and standing at the seventh position in medals tally.

== Medalists ==
The following North Korea competitors won medals at the Games.

Medal	Name	Sport	Event	Date
Gold	Ri Song-gum	Weightlifting	Women's 48 kg	20 August
Gold	Om Yun-chol	Weightlifting	Men's 56 kg	20 August
Gold	Pak Yong-mi	Wrestling	Women's freestyle 53 kg	20 August
Gold	Jong Myong-suk	Wrestling	Women's freestyle 57 kg	20 August
Gold	O Kang-chol	Weightlifting	Men's 69 kg	22 August
Gold	Choe Jon-wi	Weightlifting	Men's 77 kg	23 August
Gold	Kim Hyo-sim	Weightlifting	Women's 63 kg	24 August
Gold	Kim Su-jong	Gymnastics	Women's floor	24 August
Gold	Pak Myong-won	Shooting	Men's 10 metre running target mixed	25 August
Gold	Rim Un-sim	Weightlifting	Women's 69 kg	25 August
Gold	Rim Jong-sim	Weightlifting	Women's 75 kg	26 August
Gold	Kim Kuk-hyang	Weightlifting	Women's +75 kg	27 August
Silver	Kang Kum-song	Wrestling	Men's freestyle 57 kg	19 August
Silver	Jon Jang-mi; Jong Un-gyong; Kim Su-jong; Kim Won-yong; Pyon Rye-yong	Gymnastics	Women's artistic team all-around	22 August
Silver	Choe Hyo-sim	Weightlifting	Women's 63 kg	24 August
Silver	Pak Myong-won	Shooting	Men's 10 metre running target	24 August
Silver	Kim Su-jong	Gymnastics	Women's balance beam	24 August
Silver	Pak Yong-won; Kang Un-ju	Archery	Mixed team recurve	27 August
Silver	Cha Hyo-sim; Choe Hyon-hwa; Kim Nam-hae; Kim Song-i; Pyon Song-gyong	Table tennis	Women's team	28 August
Silver	Kim Kuk-hyang; Kim Mi-rae	Diving	Women's synchronized 10 metre platform	28 August
Silver	Kim Jin-a	Judo	Women's 57 kg	30 August
Silver	Jo Hyo-nam	Boxing	Men's 56 kg	1 September
Silver	Pang Chol-mi	Boxing	Women's 51 kg	1 September
Silver	Jo Son-hwa	Boxing	Women's 57 kg	1 September
Bronze	Kim Son-hyang	Wrestling	Women's freestyle 50 kg	20 August
Bronze	Rim Jong-sim	Wrestling	Women's freestyle 62 kg	20 August
Bronze	Kim Su-jong	Gymnastics	Women's artistic individual all-around	21 August
Bronze	Pyon Rye-yong	Gymnastics	Women's vault	23 August
Bronze	Jon Jang-mi	Gymnastics	Women's uneven bars	23 August
Bronze	Jon Myong-song	Weightlifting	Men's 85 kg	24 August
Bronze	Cha Ye-gyong; Jang Hyon-ok; Jong Na-ri; Ko Su-rim; Min Hae-yon; Mun Hye-song; Ri Il-sim; Ri Sol; Yun Yu-jong	Artistic swimming	Women's team	29 August
Bronze	Rim Song-sim	Judo	Women's 52 kg	29 August
Bronze	Kim Kwang-hui; Kim Mi-hwa	Diving	Women's synchronized 3 metre springboard	29 August
Bronze	Hyon Il-myong; Rim Kum-song	Diving	Men's synchronized 10 metre platform	29 August
Bronze	Kim Mi-rae	Diving	Women's 10 metre platform	30 August
Bronze	Choi Hye-song	Boxing	Women's 60 kg	1 September

Medals by sport
Sport	1st place, gold medalist(s)	2nd place, silver medalist(s)	3rd place, bronze medalist(s)	Total
Archery	0	1	0	1
Artistic swimming	0	0	1	1
Athletics	0	0	0	0
Boxing	0	3	1	4
Diving	0	1	3	4
Gymnastics	1	2	3	6
Judo	0	1	1	2
Shooting	1	1	0	2
Table tennis	0	1	0	1
Weightlifting	8	1	1	10
Wrestling	2	1	2	5
Total	12	12	13	37

Medals by day
Day	Date	1st place, gold medalist(s)	2nd place, silver medalist(s)	3rd place, bronze medalist(s)	Total
1	August 19	0	1	0	1
2	August 20	4	0	2	6
3	August 21	0	0	1	1
4	August 22	1	1	0	2
5	August 23	1	0	2	3
6	August 24	2	3	1	6
7	August 25	2	0	0	2
8	August 26	1	0	1	2
9	August 27	1	1	0	2
10	August 28	0	2	0	2
11	August 29	0	0	4	4
12	August 30	0	1	1	2
13	August 31	0	0	0	0
14	September 1	0	3	1	4
15	September 2	0	0	0	0
Total		12	12	13	37

== Competitors ==
The following is a list of the number of competitors representing North Korea that participated at the Games:

Sport	Men	Women	Total
Archery	3	4	7
Artistic swimming	—	9	9
Athletics	3	5	8
Boxing	5	3	8
Canoeing	0	3	3
Diving	2	4	6
Football	20	20	40
Gymnastics	6	9	15
Handball	0	14	14
Judo	3	5	8
Karate	1	2	3
Shooting	5	4	9
Soft tennis	2	2	4
Swimming	0	2	2
Table tennis	5	5	10
Weightlifting	6	7	13
Wrestling	4	4	8
Total	65	102	167

As competitors representing the unified Korea
Sport	Men	Women	Total
Basketball	0	3	3
Canoeing	8	8	16
Rowing	6	1	7
Total	14	12	26

== Archery ==
Recurve

Athlete	Event	Ranking round		Round of 64	Round of 32	Round of 16	Quarterfinals	Semifinals	Final / BM	
Athlete	Event	Score	Seed	Opposition Score	Opposition Score	Opposition Score	Opposition Score	Opposition Score	Opposition Score	Rank
Kim Kuk-song	Men's individual	618	57	did not advance						
Pak Yong-won	Men's individual	643	22	Al-Mansoori (UAE); W 6–0	Das (IND); L 3–7	did not advance				
Ri Tae-bom	Men's individual	622	34	Tan (SGP); L 3–7	did not advance					
Kim Kuk-song; Pak Yong-won; Ri Tae-bom	Men's team	1883	15	Bhutan; W 6–0	Kazakhstan; L 3–5	did not advance				
Kang Jin-hwa	Women's individual	616	38	did not advance						
Kang Un-ju	Women's individual	650	12	Bye	Thidar (MYA); L 3–7	did not advance				
Pak Hyang-sun	Women's individual	621	33	did not advance						
Ri Ji-hyang	Women's individual	634	19	Bye	Kumari (IND); L 2–6	did not advance				
Kang Un-ju; Pak Hyang-sun; Ri Ji-hyang	Women's team	1905	8	—		Vietnam; W 5–3	South Korea; L 0–6	did not advance		
Pak Yong-won; Kang Un-ju	Mixed team	1293	10	—	Pakistan; W 6–0	Indonesia; W 5–3	Chinese Taipei; W 5–4	China; W 6–2	Japan; L 0–6	2nd place, silver medalist(s)

== Artistic swimming ==
Athlete	Event	Technical routine		Free routine		Total	Rank
Athlete	Event	Points	Rank	Points	Rank	Total	Rank
Min Hae-yon; Jang Hyon-ok	Duet	82.8094	4	83.8000	4	166.6094	4
Jang Hyon-ok; Jong Na-ri; Ko Su-rim; Min Hae-yon; Mun Hye-song; Ri Il-sim; Ri Sol; Yun Yu-jong; Cha Ye-gyong^{RR}	Team	84.5142	3	86.3333	3	170.8475	3rd place, bronze medalist(s)

RR: Reserved in technical and free routines.

== Athletics ==
North Korea entered eight athletes (3 men's and 5 women's) to participate in the athletics competition at the Games.

Athletics at the 2018 Asian Games – Women's marathon

== Boxing ==
Men

Athlete	Event	Round of 32	Round of 16	Quarterfinals	Semifinals	Final	Rank
Athlete	Event	Opposition Result	Opposition Result	Opposition Result	Opposition Result	Opposition Result	Rank
Kim Jang-ryong	–49 kg	Bye	O Ahmadisafa (IRI); W 3–2	A Panghal (IND); L 0–5	did not advance		
O Tae-bom	–52 kg	Z Jumayev (TKM); W 5–0	T Drugyel (BHU); W 5–0	A Usenaliev (KGZ); L 0–5	did not advance		
Jo Hyo-nam	–56 kg	Bye	Y Meredov (TKM); W 5–0	C Butdee (THA); W 4–0	Xu BX (CHN); WO	M Mirzazizbek (UZB); L RSC-I	2nd place, silver medalist(s)
Choe Choi-man	–60 kg	Bye	H Imankuliyev (TKM); L 0–5	did not advance			
Ri Kon-thae	–64 kg	Z Azizi (AFG); W 5–0	B Chinzorig (MGL); L 0–5	did not advance			

Women

Athlete	Event	Round of 32	Round of 16	Quarterfinals	Semifinals	Final	Rank
Athlete	Event	Opposition Result	Opposition Result	Opposition Result	Opposition Result	Opposition Result	Rank
Pang Chol-mi	–51 kg	C Raksat (THA); W 4–1	I Magno (PHI); W 5–0	M Wada (JPN); W RSC	Nguyễn TT (VIE); W 4–0	Chang Y (CHN); L 2–3	2nd place, silver medalist(s)
Jo Son-hwa	–57 kg	—	B Tumurkhuyag (MGL); W 5–0	S Lather (IND); W 5–0	Huang H-w (TPE); WO	Yin JH (CHN); L 1–4	2nd place, silver medalist(s)
Choe Hye-song	–60 kg	—	N Monkhor (MGL); W 5–0	S Zulkaynarova (TJK); W 5–0	Oh Y-j (KOR); L 0–5	Did not advance	3rd place, bronze medalist(s)

== Canoeing ==
=== Sprint ===
Athlete	Event	Heats		Semifinal		Final	
Athlete	Event	Time	Rank	Time	Rank	Time	Rank
Ko Haeng-bok	Women's C-1 200 m	51.145	2 QF	Bye		49.305	4
O Un-ha; O Su-rim	Women's C-2 500 m	—				2:09.642	5

Qualification legend: QF=Final; QS=Semifinal

== Diving ==
Men

Athlete	Event	Preliminaries		Final	
Athlete	Event	Points	Rank	Points	Rank
Hyon Il-myong	10 m platform	433.40	5 Q	451.40	5
Rim Kum-song	10 m platform	376.70	8 Q	399.15	6
Hyon Il-myong; Rim Kum-song	10 m synchronized platform	—		395.04	3rd place, bronze medalist(s)

Women

Athlete	Event	Preliminaries		Final	
Athlete	Event	Points	Rank	Points	Rank
Kim Kwang-hui	1 m springboard	243.90	5 Q	197.10	10
Kim Mi-hwa	1 m springboard	220.85	8 Q	226.05	7
Kim Kuk-hyang	10 m platform	341.35	3 Q	367.45	4
Kim Mi-rae	10 m platform	324.15	4 Q	367.90	3rd place, bronze medalist(s)
Kim Kwang-hui; Kim Mi-hwa	3 m synchronized springboard	—		282.78	3rd place, bronze medalist(s)
Kim Kuk-hyang; Kim Mi-rae	10 m synchronized platform	—		337.86	2nd place, silver medalist(s)

== Football ==
North Korea men's team were drawn in Group F at the Games, while the women's team in Group B. North Korea women's team were the champion in the last edition in Incheon.

Summary

Team	Event	Group Stage				Round of 16	Quarterfinal	Semifinal	Final / BM	
Team	Event	Opposition Score	Opposition Score	Opposition Score	Rank	Opposition Score	Opposition Score	Opposition Score	Opposition Score	Rank
North Korea men's	Men's tournament	Myanmar; D 1–1	Iran; L 0–3	Saudi Arabia; W 3–0	2 Q	Bangladesh; W 3–1	United Arab Emirates; L 1–1 PSO 3–5	did not advance		7
North Korea women's	Women's tournament	Tajikistan; W 16–0	Hong Kong; W 7–0	China; L 0–2	2 Q	—	Japan; L 1–2	did not advance		6

=== Men's tournament ===
Roster

The following is the North Korea squad in the men's football tournament of the 2018 Asian Games.

Head coach: Ju Song-il

No.	Pos.	Player	Date of birth (age)	Caps	Goals	Club
1	GK	Kim Yu-il	30 January 1997 (aged 21)			(North Korea) Kigwancha
18	GK	Kang Ju-hyok	31 May 1997 (aged 21)			(North Korea) Hwaebul
2	DF	An Song-il	5 August 1996 (aged 22)			(North Korea) April 25
3	DF	Song Kum-song (captain)	23 August 1995 (aged 22)			(North Korea) Rimyongsu
5	DF	Kim Nam-il	1 January 1996 (aged 22)			(North Korea) Ryomyong
19	DF	Jong Tong-chol	21 April 1997 (aged 21)			(North Korea) Rimyongsu
21	DF	Kim Chol-bom*	16 July 1994 (aged 24)			(North Korea) April 25
22	DF	Jang Kuk-chol*	16 February 1994 (aged 24)			(North Korea) Hwaebul
4	MF	Ri Un-chol	13 July 1995 (aged 23)			(North Korea) Sonbong
6	MF	Kim Kuk-bom	19 February 1995 (aged 23)			(North Korea) April 25
7	MF	Jo Kwang-myong	3 January 1995 (aged 23)			(North Korea) April 25
13	MF	Ju Kyong-chol	14 November 1997 (aged 20)			
14	MF	Kim Kum-chol	7 April 1997 (aged 21)			(North Korea) Rimyongsu
15	MF	Kim Chung-il	21 August 1997 (aged 20)			
17	MF	Kang Kuk-chol	29 September 1999 (aged 18)			(North Korea) Rimyongsu
25	MF	Ryang Hyon-ju	31 May 1998 (aged 20)			(Japan) Waseda University
12	FW	Han Yong-thae	30 October 1996 (aged 21)			(Japan) Korea University
16	FW	Kim Yong-il*	6 July 1994 (aged 24)			(North Korea) Kigwancha
20	FW	So Jong-hyok	1 July 1995 (aged 23)			(North Korea) April 25
23	FW	Kim Yu-song	24 January 1995 (aged 23)			(North Korea) April 25

* Over-aged player.

Group F

Pos	Team	Pld	W	D	L	GF	GA	GD	Pts	Qualification
1	Iran	3	1	1	1	3	2	+1	4	Advance to knockout stage
2	North Korea	3	1	1	1	4	4	0	4	Advance to knockout stage
3	Saudi Arabia	3	1	1	1	3	3	0	4	Advance to knockout stage
4	Myanmar	3	1	1	1	3	4	−1	4	

Source: Asian Games 2018
Rules for classification: Group stage tiebreakers
15 August 2018
19:00 UTC+7

North Korea	1–1	Myanmar
Jang Kuk-chol 60'	Report	Maung Maung Lwin 44'

Wibawa Mukti Stadium, Cikarang
Referee: Masoud Tufaylieh (Syria)

17 August 2018
16:00 UTC+7

Iran	3–0	North Korea
Roustaei 27'; Ghaedi 68'; Aghasi 90+3' (pen.)	Report

Wibawa Mukti Stadium, Cikarang
Referee: Mahmood Al-Majarafi (Oman)

20 August 2018
16:00 UTC+7

North Korea	3–0	Saudi Arabia
Kim Yong-il 2'; Kim Yu-song 25', 51'	Report

Wibawa Mukti Stadium, Cikarang
Referee: Nasrullo Kabirov (Tajikistan)

Round of 16

24 August 2018
19:30 UTC+7

Bangladesh	1–3	North Korea
Saad Uddin 90+1'	Report	Kim Yu-song 14' (pen.); Han Yong-thae 38'; Kang Kuk-chol 68'

Wibawa Mukti Stadium, Cikarang
Referee: Ammar Mahfoodh (Bahrain)

Quarter-final

27 August 2018
19:30 UTC+7

United Arab Emirates	1–1 (a.e.t.)	North Korea
Al-Yahyaee 67'	Report	Kim Yu-song 63'
Penalties
Al-Attas (penalty scored); Z. Al-Ameri (penalty scored); Ibrahim (penalty scored); Omar (penalty scored); Mohammed (penalty scored)	5–3	(penalty scored) Kim Yu-song; (penalty scored) Jang Kuk-chol; (penalty scored) Ri Un-chol; (penalty missed) So Jong-hyok

Pakansari Stadium, Cibinong
Referee: Aziz Asimov (Uzbekistan)

=== Women's tournament ===
Roster

The following is the North Korea squad in the women's football tournament of the 2018 Asian Games.

Head coach: (North Korea) Kim Kwang-min

No.	Pos.	Player	Date of birth (age)	Caps	Goals	Club
1	GK	Paek Yong-hui	16 April 1990 (aged 28)			(North Korea) Pyongyang City
18	GK	Kim Myong-sun	6 March 1997 (aged 21)			(North Korea) Sobaeksu
19	GK	Choe Kyong-im	15 July 1993 (aged 25)			
2	DF	Ri Un-yong	1 September 1996 (aged 21)			(North Korea) Sobaeksu
3	DF	Pak Hye-gyong	7 November 2001 (aged 16)			(North Korea) April 25
4	DF	Ri Kyong-hyang	10 June 1996 (aged 22)			(North Korea) April 25
5	DF	Wi Jong-sim	13 October 1997 (aged 20)			(North Korea) Kalmaegi
15	DF	Kim Nam-hui	4 March 1994 (aged 24)			(North Korea) April 25
16	DF	Kim Un-ha	23 March 1993 (aged 25)			(North Korea) Sobaeksu
17	DF	Son Ok-ju	7 March 2000 (aged 18)			(North Korea) Rimyongsu
6	MF	Ju Hyo-sim	21 June 1998 (aged 20)			(North Korea) April 25
7	MF	Kim Un-hwa	30 September 1992 (aged 25)			(North Korea) Wolmido
8	MF	Yu Jong-im	6 December 1993 (aged 24)			(North Korea) Amrokkang
10	MF	Rim Se-ok	13 January 1994 (aged 24)			
13	MF	Kim Phyong-hwa	28 November 1996 (aged 21)			(North Korea) Sobaeksu
14	MF	Ri Hyang-sim	23 March 1996 (aged 22)			(North Korea) Amrokkang
9	FW	Jang Hyon-sun	1 July 1991 (aged 27)			(North Korea) Wolmido
11	FW	Sung Hyang-sim	2 December 1999 (aged 18)			(North Korea) Pyongyang City
12	FW	Kim Yun-mi	1 July 1993 (aged 25)			(North Korea) Amrokkang
20	FW	Ri Hae-yon	10 January 1999 (aged 19)			(North Korea) April 25

Group B

Pos	Team	Pld	W	D	L	GF	GA	GD	Pts	Qualification
1	China	3	3	0	0	25	0	+25	9	Advance to Knockout stage
2	North Korea	3	2	0	1	24	2	+22	6	Advance to Knockout stage
3	Hong Kong	3	1	0	2	6	16	−10	3	Advance to Knockout stage
4	Tajikistan	3	0	0	3	1	38	−37	0	

Source: Asian Games 2018
Rules for classification: Group stage tiebreakers
17 August 2018
18:30 UTC+7

North Korea	16–0	Tajikistan
Sung Hyang-sim 2', 6', 24', 42'; Kim Yun-mi 10', 19', 50'; Rim Se-ok 31', 55', 66'; Yu Jong-im 43'; Kim Phyong-hwa 46'; Kim Nam-hui 62'; Kim Un-hwa 77', 82'; Ri Hae-yon 79'	Report

Bumi Sriwijaya Stadium, Palembang
Referee: Pansa Chaisanit (Thailand)

20 August 2018
18:30 UTC+7

Hong Kong	0–8	North Korea
	Report	Ri Un-yong 19'; Yu Jong-im 22', 45+2'; Kim Yun-mi 36'; Pak Hye-gyong 55'; Kim Un-hwa 59'; Ri Hae-yon 78'; Fung 82' (o.g.)

Bumi Sriwijaya Stadium, Palembang
Referee: Anna Sidorova (Uzbekistan)

22 August 2018
18:30 UTC+7

North Korea	0–2	China
	Report	Wang Shuang 8'; Wang Shanshan 50'

Gelora Sriwijaya Stadium, Palembang
Referee: Rebecca Durcau (Australia)

Quarter-final

25 August 2018
16:00 UTC+7

Japan	2–1	North Korea
Iwabuchi 40'; Hasegawa 62'	Report	Kim Nam-hui 71' (pen.)

Gelora Sriwijaya Stadium, Palembang
Referee: Mahsa Ghorbani (Iran)

== Handball ==
North Korea joined in group A at the women's team event.

Summary

Key:

- ET – After extra time
- P – Match decided by penalty-shootout.

Team	Event	Preliminary	Standing	Semifinals / Pl.	Final / BM / Pl.	
Team	Event	Opposition Score	Standing	Opposition Score	Opposition Score	Rank
North Korea women's	Women's tournament	Group A South Korea: L 22–39; Kazakhstan: W 37–33; India: W 49–19; China: L 31–34	3	Indonesia; W 59–15	Kazakhstan; W 32–30	5

=== Women's tournament ===
Roster

- Ho Ryu-gyong
- O Kyong-sun
- Choe Chun-il
- Kil Mi-hyang
- An Ok-sim
- Han Jong-hyang
- Jang Ok-hyang
- Kim Jong-hui
- Mun Un-suk
- Mun Hong-sim
- Kim Chol-sun
- Kim Un-gyong
- Han Chun-yon
- Choe Pong-im

Group A

Pos	Team	Pld	W	D	L	GF	GA	GD	Pts	Qualification
1	South Korea	4	4	0	0	151	86	+65	8	Semifinals
2	China	4	2	0	2	120	112	+8	4 (Note: Tied on head-to-head points (2). Head-to-head goal difference: CHN +2, PRK +1, KAZ −3.)	Semifinals
3	North Korea	4	2	0	2	139	125	+14	4	Classification 5th–8th
4	Kazakhstan	4	2	0	2	118	116	+2	4	Classification 5th–8th
5	India	4	0	0	4	77	166	−89	0	Classification 9th–10th

Source: AHF
Notes:

14 August; 16:00	North Korea	22–39	South Korea	POPKI Sports Hall, Jakarta; Referees: Al-Marhoon, Al-Mawt (BHR)
14 August; 16:00	Han C.Y. 5	(12–17)	Jung Y.R. 12	POPKI Sports Hall, Jakarta; Referees: Al-Marhoon, Al-Mawt (BHR)
14 August; 16:00	1× (yellow card) 5× (suspension)		3× (yellow card) 4× (suspension)	POPKI Sports Hall, Jakarta; Referees: Al-Marhoon, Al-Mawt (BHR)

19 August; 18:00	Kazakhstan	33–37	North Korea	POPKI Sports Hall, Jakarta; Referees: Shakir, Kadhim (IRQ)
19 August; 18:00	Abilda 10	(17–17)	O K.S. 9	POPKI Sports Hall, Jakarta; Referees: Shakir, Kadhim (IRQ)
19 August; 18:00	3× (yellow card) 1× (suspension)		4× (suspension)	POPKI Sports Hall, Jakarta; Referees: Shakir, Kadhim (IRQ)

21 August; 14:00	North Korea	49–19	India	POPKI Sports Hall, Jakarta; Referees: Hizaki, Ikebuchi (JPN)
21 August; 14:00	Choe P.I. 11	(23–10)	Ghanghas, Kaur, Rimpi 4	POPKI Sports Hall, Jakarta; Referees: Hizaki, Ikebuchi (JPN)
21 August; 14:00	2× (yellow card) 3× (suspension)		3× (yellow card) 4× (suspension)	POPKI Sports Hall, Jakarta; Referees: Hizaki, Ikebuchi (JPN)

23 August; 14:00	North Korea	31–34	China	POPKI Sports Hall, Jakarta; Referees: Ota, Shimajiri (JPN)
23 August; 14:00	Choe C.I.	(14–17)	Liu X.M. 13	POPKI Sports Hall, Jakarta; Referees: Ota, Shimajiri (JPN)
23 August; 14:00	2× (yellow card) 3× (suspension)		1× (yellow card) 2× (suspension)	POPKI Sports Hall, Jakarta; Referees: Ota, Shimajiri (JPN)

5–8th place semifinal

25 August; 16:00	North Korea	59–15	Indonesia	POPKI Sports Hall, Jakarta; Referees: Al-Wahibi, Al-Shahi (OMA)
25 August; 16:00	Choe P.I. 13	(28–6)	Apriliani 7	POPKI Sports Hall, Jakarta; Referees: Al-Wahibi, Al-Shahi (OMA)
25 August; 16:00	1× (yellow card) 1× (suspension)		2× (yellow card) 5× (suspension)	POPKI Sports Hall, Jakarta; Referees: Al-Wahibi, Al-Shahi (OMA)

Fifth place game

29 August; 16:00	North Korea	32–30	Kazakhstan	POPKI Sports Hall, Jakarta; Referees: Ota, Shimajiri (JPN)
29 August; 16:00	Mun U.S. 12	(16–13)	Ilyina 9	POPKI Sports Hall, Jakarta; Referees: Ota, Shimajiri (JPN)
29 August; 16:00	2× (yellow card) 3× (suspension)		1× (yellow card) 5× (suspension)	POPKI Sports Hall, Jakarta; Referees: Ota, Shimajiri (JPN)

== Judo ==
North Korea put up 8 athletes for Judo:

Key:

- 1st number — Ippon
- 2nd number — Waza-ari
- s — Shido

Men

Athlete	Event	Round of 32	Round of 16	Quarterfinals	Semifinals	Repechage	Final / BM	Rank
Athlete	Event	Opposition Result	Opposition Result	Opposition Result	Opposition Result	Opposition Result	Opposition Result	Rank
An Jae-yong	–60 kg	Bye	O Bestaev (KGZ); W 10s2–00s2	Y Smetov (KAZ); W 10s2–00s3	T Shishime (JPN); L 00s1–01	Bye	Yang Y-w (TPE); L 00s3–10s1	–
Kim Hyong-un	–66 kg	I Shresta (NEP); W 10–00	A Khojasteh (IRI); W 10s2–00s2	S Akhadov (UZB); L 00s1–01s2	Did not advance	A El-Idrissi (QAT); L 00s3–10s2	did not advance	
Kim Chol-gwang	–73 kg	S Sehen (IRQ); W 10–00s1	Z Smangulov (KAZ); W 10–00s1	S Ono (JPN); L 00s1–10	Did not advance	G Boboev (UZB); W 01s2–00s1	M Mohammadi (IRI); L 00–10	–

Women

Athlete	Event	Round of 32	Round of 16	Quarterfinals	Semifinals	Repechage	Final / BM	Rank
Athlete	Event	Opposition Result	Opposition Result	Opposition Result	Opposition Result	Opposition Result	Opposition Result	Rank
Jon Yu-sun	–48 kg	—	A Warasiha (THA); W 10–01	G Otgontsetseg (KAZ); L 00s1–01	Did not advance	D Keldiyorova (UZB); W 10–00	M Urantsetseg (MGL); L 01–10	–
Rim Song-sim	–52 kg	Bye	K Karassaikyzy (KAZ); W 11–00s3	K Warasiha (THA); W 10–00	N Tsunoda (MGL); L 00–10	Bye	G Ziyaeva (UZB); W 01s1–00s2	3rd place, bronze medalist(s)
Kim Jin-a	–57 kg	Bye	A Allanazarova (UZB); W 10–00s1	D Sumiyaa (MGL); W 10s2–00s2	S Nishanbayeva (KAZ); W 01–00	—	M Tamaoki (JPN); L 01–10	2nd place, silver medalist(s)
Ri Pok-hyang	–63 kg	—	Tang J (CHN); L 00s2–01s2	did not advance				
Kwon Sun-yong	–70 kg	—	Huang Y-t (TPE); W 01–00	Z Bektaskyzy (KAZ); L 00–01	Did not advance	Zhu Y (CHN); L 00s1–01	did not advance	

== Karate ==
North Korea participated in the karate competition at the Games with three athletes (1 men and 2 women's).

== Shooting ==
Men

Athlete	Event	Qualification		Final	
Athlete	Event	Points	Rank	Points	Rank
Kim Song-guk	10 m air pistol	575	13	did not advance	
Ryong Song-gang	10 m air rifle	606.7	38	did not advance	
Kwon Kwang-il	10 m running target	567	7	did not advance	
Pak Myong-won	10 m running target	573	1 Q	SF: Cho S-j (KOR); W 7–5; F: Jeong Y-j (KOR); L 4–6	2nd place, silver medalist(s)
Jo Yong-chol	10 m running target mixed	—		375	7
Pak Myong-won	10 m running target mixed	—		384	1st place, gold medalist(s)

Women

Athlete	Event	Qualification		Final	
Athlete	Event	Points	Rank	Points	Rank
Han Yong-sim	10 m air pistol	556	29	did not advance	
Ri Un-gyong	10 m air rifle	607.1	36	did not advance	
Kim Yong-bok	Trap	105	21	did not advance	
Pak Yong-hui	Trap	112	10	did not advance	

Mixed team

Athlete	Event	Qualification		Final	
Athlete	Event	Points	Rank	Points	Rank
Kim Song-guk; Han Yong-sim	10 m air pistol	751	15	did not advance	
Ryong Song-gang; Ri Un-gyong	10 m air rifle	809.7	18	did not advance	

== Soft tennis ==
Athlete	Event	Group Stage				Quarterfinals	Semifinals	Final	
Athlete	Event	Opposition Score	Opposition Score	Opposition Score	Rank	Opposition Score	Opposition Score	Opposition Score	Rank
Ri Chung-il	Men's singles	J Mehlda (IND); W 4–2	Chen T-w (TPE); W 4–3	—	1 Q	Kim J-w (KOR); L 2–4	did not advance		
So Je-il	Men's singles	J Arcilla (PHI); W 4–1	C Leampriboon (THA); W 4–3	—	1 Q	AE Sie (INA); L 1–4	did not advance		
Hong Ji-sun	Women's singles	Chen C-l (TPE); L 1–4	Wang YF (CHN); W 4–0	Trần THN (VIE); W 4–0	2	did not advance			
Kim Mi-hyang	Women's singles	SEB Zaidi (PAK); W 4–0	N Manalac (PHI); W 4–3	—	1 Q	Yu YY (CHN); L 3–4	did not advance		
Kim Mi-hyang; So Je-il	Mixed doubles	Lâm QT / Trần THN (VIE); W 5–0	MA Alcoseba / PL Catindig (PHI); W 5–2	M. Anugerah / V Darlina (INA); W 5–2	1 Q	Kim B-j / Kim J-y (KOR); L 1–5	did not advance		
Ri Chung-il; Hong Ji-sun	Mixed doubles	Kim K-s / Mun H-g (KOR); WO	S Vannasak / M Aliya (LAO); L 0^{R}–5	—	3	did not advance			

== Swimming ==
Women

Athlete	Event	Heats		Final	
Athlete	Event	Time	Rank	Time	Rank
Jang Myong-gyong	50 m breaststroke	34.95	19	did not advance	
Pak Mi-song	50 m freestyle	27.07	16	did not advance	

== Table tennis ==
Individual

Athlete	Event	Round 1	Round 2	Round of 16	Quarterfinals	Semifinals	Final	
Athlete	Event	Opposition Score	Opposition Score	Opposition Score	Opposition Score	Opposition Score	Opposition Score	Rank
Choe Il	Men's singles	L Enkhbat (MGL); W 4–1	K Matsudaira (JPN); L 1–4	did not advance				
Pak Sin-hyok	Men's singles	Bye	A Al-Naggar (QAT); W 4–2	Lee S-s (KOR); L 2–4	did not advance			
Cha Hyo-sim	Women's singles	Bye	N Shahsavari (IRI); W 4–0	Seo H-w (KOR); L 1–4	did not advance			
Kim Song-i	Women's singles	Bye	M Ashtari (IRI); W 4–0	M Kato (JPN); L 3–4	did not advance			
An Ji-song; Cha Hyo-sim	Mixed doubles	Bye	Cheong CC / Chong WI (MAC); WO	Chuang C-y / Chen S-y (TPE); W 3–0	S Kamal / M Batra (IND); L 2–3	did not advance		
Pak Sin-hyok; Kim Nam-hae	Mixed doubles	Bye	Dinh DL / Nguyễn TN (VIE); W 3–0	Lin GY / Wang MY (CHN); L 0–3	did not advance			

Team

Athlete	Event	Group Stage					Quarterfinal	Semifinal	Final	
Athlete	Event	Opposition Score	Opposition Score	Opposition Score	Opposition Score	Rank	Opposition Score	Opposition Score	Opposition Score	Rank
Pak Sin-hyok; Choe Il; An Ji-song; Ham Yu-song; Ri Kwang-myong	Men's	Laos (LAO); W 3–0	China (CHN); L 0–3	Nepal (NEP); W 3–0	Malaysia (MAS); W 3–0	2 Q	South Korea (KOR); L 2–3	did not advance		
Kim Song-i; Cha Hyo-sim; Choe Hyon-hwa; Kim Nam-hae; Pyon Song-gyong	Women's	Mongolia (MGL); W 3–0	Japan (JPN); W 3–2	Thailand (THA); W 3–1	—	1 Q	Chinese Taipei (TPE); W 3–1	Hong Kong (HKG); W 3–0	China (CHN); L 0–3	2nd place, silver medalist(s)

== Weightlifting ==
North Korea is aiming to win seven to eight gold medals from their weightlifters.

Men

Athlete	Event	Snatch		Clean & Jerk		Total	Rank
Athlete	Event	Result	Rank	Result	Rank	Total	Rank
Om Yun-chol	−56 kg	127	2	160	1	287	1st place, gold medalist(s)
Sin Chol-bom	−62 kg	130	5	168	2	298	4
O Kang-chol	−69 kg	151	1	186	2	336	1st place, gold medalist(s)
Kim Myong-hyok	−69 kg	~~150~~	DNF	—	—	—	—
Choe Jon-wi	−77 kg	155	2	193	1	348	1st place, gold medalist(s)
Jon Myong-song	−85 kg	158	3	190	4	348	3rd place, bronze medalist(s)

Women

Athlete	Event	Snatch		Clean & Jerk		Total	Rank
Athlete	Event	Result	Rank	Result	Rank	Total	Rank
Ri Song-gum	−48 kg	87	2	112	1	199	1st place, gold medalist(s)
Kim Chung-sim	−53 kg	88	5	112	4	200	4
Kim Hyo-sim	−63 kg	113	1	137	1	250	1st place, gold medalist(s)
Choe Hyo-sim	−63 kg	105	2	133	2	238	2nd place, silver medalist(s)
Rim Un-sim	−69 kg	109	1	137	1	246	1st place, gold medalist(s)
Rim Jong-sim	−75 kg	116	1	147	1	263	1st place, gold medalist(s)
Kim Kuk-hyang	+75 kg	126	1	165	1	291	1st place, gold medalist(s)

== Wrestling ==
North Korea represented by 8 strong wrestlers at the Games. This sport contributing 5 medals (2 gold, 1 silver, and 2 bronze) for the contingent. The gold medals won by the women's wrestler Pak Yong-mi and Jong Myong-suk.

Key:

- F – Victory by fall.
- PP – Decision by points – the loser with technical points.
- PO – Decision by points – the loser without technical points.
- ST – Great superiority – the loser without technical points and a margin of victory of at least 8 (Greco-Roman) or 10 (freestyle) points.

Men's freestyle

Athlete	Event	Qualification	Round of 16	Quarterfinal	Semifinal	Repechage 1	Repechage 2	Final / BM	
Athlete	Event	Opposition Result	Opposition Result	Opposition Result	Opposition Result	Opposition Result	Opposition Result	Opposition Result	Rank
Kang Kum-song	−57 kg	Bye	Takahashi (JPN); W 9–5	Z Ismailov (KAZ); W 3–1	Liu MC (CHN); W 10–0	Bye		Bekhbayar (MGL); L 2–8	2nd place, silver medalist(s)
Kim Kuk-gwang	−65 kg	Bye	H Al-Azzani (YEM); W 10–0	B Batmagnai (MGL); L 3–4	did not advance				10

Men's Greco-Roman

Athlete	Event	Round of 16	Quarterfinal	Semifinal	Repechage	Final / BM	
Athlete	Event	Opposition Result	Opposition Result	Opposition Result	Opposition Result	Opposition Result	Rank
Ri Se-ung	−60 kg	Zholchubekov (KGZ); L 2–10	did not advance		W Sailike (CHN); W 9–0	Ainagulov (KAZ); L 5–13	5
Kim Myong-chol	−67 kg	M Aliansyah (INA); L 2–2 ^{PP}	did not advance				12

Women's freestyle

Athlete	Event	Round of 16	Quarterfinal	Semifinal	Repechage	Final / BM	
Athlete	Event	Opposition Result	Opposition Result	Opposition Result	Opposition Result	Opposition Result	Rank
Kim Son-hyang	−50 kg	Bye	D Samnang (CAM); W 10–0	Y Irie (JPN); L 4–13	Bye	E Setiawati (INA); W 10–0	3rd place, bronze medalist(s)
Pak Yong-mi	−53 kg	Bye	Chiu H-j (TPE); W 6–0	H Okuno (JPN); W 7–7 ^{PP}	Bye	Z Eshimova (KAZ); W 11–0	1st place, gold medalist(s)
Jong Myong-suk	−57 kg	K Sakagami (JPN); W 9–6	E Tissina (KAZ); W 10–0	P Dhanda (IND); W 10–0	Bye	Pei XR (CHN); W 5–4	1st place, gold medalist(s)
Rim Jong-sim	−62 kg	A Tynybekova (KGZ); L 6–6 ^{PP}	did not advance		Xu R (CHN); W 10–0	S Malik (IND); W 12–2	3rd place, bronze medalist(s)

== See also ==
- North Korea at the 2018 Asian Para Games
