= Gymnastics at the 2018 Asian Games – Women's vault =

Women's vault at the 2018 Asian Games
- Venue: Jakarta International Expo
- Date: 21–23 August 2018
- Competitors: 23 from 14 nations

Medalists
gold medal	Yeo Seo-jeong	South Korea
silver medal	Oksana Chusovitina	Uzbekistan
bronze medal	Pyon Rye-yong	North Korea

The women's vault competition at the 2018 Asian Games in Jakarta, Indonesia was held on 21 and 23 August 2018 at the Jakarta International Expo Hall D2.

== Schedule ==
All times are Western Indonesia Time (UTC+07:00)

Date	Time	Event
Tuesday, 21 August 2018	14:00	Qualification
Thursday, 23 August 2018	16:30	Final

== Results ==
Legend

- DNF — Did not finish
- DNS — Did not start

=== Qualification ===
Rank	Athlete	Vault 1	Vault 2	Total
1	Yeo Seo-jeong (KOR)	14.600	14.300	14.450
2	Pyon Rye-yong (PRK)	14.300	14.250	14.275
3	Oksana Chusovitina (UZB)	14.300	14.100	14.200
4	Kim Su-jong (PRK)	14.300	13.400	13.850
5	Rifda Irfanaluthfi (INA)	13.500	13.500	13.500
6	Pranati Nayak (IND)	13.500	13.350	13.425
7	Aruna Reddy (IND)	13.400	13.300	13.350
8	Dipa Karmakar (IND)	13.450	13.000	13.225
9	Fang Ko-ching (TPE)	13.350	12.750	13.050
10	Tan Ing Yueh (MAS)	13.300	12.650	12.975
11	Soyoka Hanawa (JPN)	12.700	13.150	12.925
12	Trần Đoàn Quỳnh Nam (VIE)	12.900	12.850	12.875
13	Olga Sanjiyeva (KAZ)	12.650	12.800	12.725
14	Thidaporn Khanthara (THA)	12.700	12.600	12.650
15	Praewpraw Doungchan (THA)	12.750	12.150	12.450
16	Elizabeth Chan (HKG)	12.450	12.200	12.325
17	Amalia Nurun Fauziah (INA)	12.400	12.150	12.275
18	Cristina Onofre (PHI)	12.650	11.750	12.200
19	Chuang Hsiu-ju (TPE)	12.650	11.650	12.150
20	Sasiwimon Mueangphuan (THA)	12.500	11.600	12.050
21	Sabina Turobova (UZB)	12.050	11.200	11.625
22	Liu Jinru (CHN)	14.000	0.000	7.000
—	Trương Khánh Vân (VIE)	12.150	DNS	DNF

=== Final ===
Rank	Athlete	Vault 1	Vault 2	Total
1st place, gold medalist(s)	Yeo Seo-jeong (KOR)	14.525	14.250	14.387
2nd place, silver medalist(s)	Oksana Chusovitina (UZB)	14.350	14.225	14.287
3rd place, bronze medalist(s)	Pyon Rye-yong (PRK)	13.325	14.425	13.875
4	Rifda Irfanaluthfi (INA)	13.150	13.425	13.287
5	Fang Ko-ching (TPE)	13.525	12.850	13.187
6	Kim Su-jong (PRK)	13.550	12.725	13.137
7	Aruna Reddy (IND)	12.125	13.425	12.775
8	Pranati Nayak (IND)	12.725	12.575	12.650
