= Diving at the 2018 Asian Games – Men's synchronized 10 metre platform =

Sporting event at the 2018 Asian Games

Men's synchronized 10 metre platform at the 2018 Asian Games
- Venue: Gelora Bung Karno Aquatic Stadium
- Date: 29 August 2018
- Competitors: 16 from 8 nations

Medalists
gold medal	Chen Aisen; Yang Hao	China
silver medal	Kim Yeong-nam; Woo Ha-ram	South Korea
bronze medal	Hyon Il-myong; Rim Kum-song	North Korea

The men's synchronized 10 metre platform competition at the 2018 Asian Games took place on 29 August 2018 at the Gelora Bung Karno Aquatic Stadium in Gelora, Central Jakarta, Indonesia.

== Schedule ==
All times are Western Indonesia Time (UTC+07:00)

Date	Time	Event
Wednesday, 29 August 2018	20:15	Final

== Results ==
Rank	Team	Dive						Total
Rank	Team	1	2	3	4	5	6	Total
1st place, gold medalist(s)	China (CHN); Chen Aisen; Yang Hao	56.40	57.60	89.76	85.32	89.91	87.48	466.47
2nd place, silver medalist(s)	South Korea (KOR); Kim Yeong-nam; Woo Ha-ram	51.00	48.00	72.96	75.48	84.24	74.37	406.05
3rd place, bronze medalist(s)	North Korea (PRK); Hyon Il-myong; Rim Kum-song	48.00	43.80	62.10	75.84	86.58	78.72	395.04
4	Indonesia (INA); Andriyan; Adityo Restu Putra	45.60	46.20	68.40	71.04	71.04	70.29	372.57
5	Malaysia (MAS); Jellson Jabillin; Hanis Nazirul Jaya Surya	49.20	50.40	60.48	48.60	74.88	72.96	356.52
6	Iran (IRI); Shahnam Nazarpour; Mojtaba Valipour	43.20	41.40	59.40	60.90	58.56	54.60	318.06
7	Thailand (THA); Conrad Lewandowski; Thitipoom Marksin	40.80	32.40	57.60	58.56	53.76	48.72	291.84
8	Singapore (SGP); Jonathan Chan; Joshua Chong	40.80	40.80	54.90	59.52	36.12	59.52	291.66
