= Zhang Jin (gymnast) =

Chinese artistic gymnast

- Born: 25 November 2000 (age 25) Shanghai, China
- Height: 143 cm (4 ft 8 in)

Gymnastics career
- Discipline: Women's artistic gymnastics
- Country represented: China; (2015–present)
- Head coach: Liang Chow
- Retired: 2025
Medal record
World Championships
Bronze medal – third place	2018 Doha	Team
Asian Games
Gold medal – first place	2018 Jakarta	Team
Gold medal – first place	2022 Hangzhou	Team
Gold medal – first place	2022 Hangzhou	Floor exercise
Bronze medal – third place	2018 Jakarta	Balance beam
Asian Championships
Gold medal – first place	2022 Doha	Team
Gold medal – first place	2022 Doha	All-around
Bronze medal – third place	2022 Doha	Balance beam
World University Games
Gold medal – first place	2021 Chengdu	Team
National Games
Bronze medal – third place	2017 Tianjin	Team

Zhang Jin (Chinese: 章瑾; pinyin: Zhāng Jǐn; born 25 November 2000) is a former Chinese artistic gymnast. She is a 2018 World bronze medalist and 2018 Asian Games champion in the team event. She is also the 2018 Asian Games bronze medalist on the balance beam and the 2018 Stuttgart World Cup all-around champion. She represented China at the 2020 Summer Olympics.

== Early life ==
Zhang Jin was born on 25 November 2000 in Shanghai. She began gymnastics when she was four years old.

== Junior career ==
Zhang competed on the vault and the balance beam at the 2014 Chinese Championships and helped the Shanghai team finish fourth. She made her international debut at the 2015 Austrian Team Open and helped the Chinese team win the gold medal. Then at the 2015 Chinese Championships, she won the silver medal in the team event and finished twenty-second in the all-around final. At the 2015 National Youth Games, Zhang helped her provincial team finish fourth. She then competed at the 2015 Olympic Hopes Cup in Liberec and won the silver medal with the Chinese team and the bronze medal in the all-around.

== Senior career ==
=== 2016 ===
Zhang made her senior debut at the Olympic Test Event in Rio de Janeiro where she finished seventeenth in the all-around with a total score of 54.316. At the Chinese Championships, she won the bronze medal in the team event and placed tenth in the all-around. She was not named to China's 2016 Olympic team. In October, she competed at the Chinese Individual Championships, but did not advance to any event finals.

=== 2017 ===
Zhang finished sixth in the all-around at the Stuttgart World Cup. Then at the Chinese Championships, she finished eighth in the all-around. At the National Games, she won the bronze medal with the Shanghai team. Individually, she finished tenth in the all-around, seventh on vault and floor exercise. She finished her season at the Chinese Individual Championships where she won gold on the floor exercise, silver on the vault, and bronze on the balance beam.

=== 2018 ===
Zhang won the gold medal in the all-around at the Stuttgart World Cup with a total score of 53.431. Then at the Chinese Championships, she won the silver medal in the all-around behind Luo Huan and placed fourth on the balance beam. She was selected to represent China at the 2018 Asian Games alongside Chen Yile, Liu Jinru, Liu Tingting, and Luo Huan, and they won the team gold medal. Then in the balance beam final, she won the bronze medal behind Yile and Kim Su-jong. The same team was then selected to compete at the World Championships. Although Zhang fell on the balance beam, the team won the bronze medal. On her mistake in the team final, she stated, "I am a little bit disappointed. [The] uneven bars were good. We made one mistake but didn't drop too many points. I was not worried about balance beam before the competition because usually we are very good, but it wasn't good." In the balance beam final, she fell twice and finished last with a score of 11.500.

=== 2019 ===
Zhang helped the Chinese team win the silver medal at the City of Jesolo Trophy. Individually, she finished sixth in the all-around and fourth on the balance beam and floor exercise. Then at the Chinese Championships, she finished ninth in the all-around and seventh on the floor exercise.

=== 2020 ===
In March, Zhang competed at the American Cup and finished ninth in the all-around. She was scheduled to compete at the Birmingham World Cup, but the event was postponed and eventually canceled due to the COVID-19 pandemic. In September, she competed at the postponed Chinese Championships and finished seventh in the all-around. She ended the season at the Friendship and Solidarity Competition, which was held under strict COVID-19 safety protocols in Tokyo in November. She competed on all four events to help Team Solidarity win gold.

=== 2021 ===
At the Chinese Championships, Zhang won the silver medal in the all-around behind Lu Yufei and placed fifth on the balance beam and fourth on the floor exercise. She won the gold medals in the all-around at both the 1st and 2nd Chinese Olympic Trials. On 3 July, she was selected to represent China at the 2020 Summer Olympics alongside Lu Yufei, Ou Yushan, and Tang Xijing.

During the qualification round, Zhang competed on all four events to help the Chinese team qualify in third place. Then in the team final, Zhang contributed scores of 14.066 on vault, 13.900 on balance beam, and 13.133 on floor exercise towards the team's seventh-place finish. After the Olympics, she competed at the National Games where she finished fifth in the all-around and fourth on the floor exercise.

=== 2022 ===
Zhang competed at the 2022 Asian Championships in June, and helped China place first as a team. Individually, she won gold in the all-around and bronze on balance beam.

== Competitive history ==
Year	Event	Team	AA	VT	UB	BB	FX
Junior
2014	National Championships	4					
2015	Austrian Team Open	1st place, gold medalist(s)	12				
2015	National Championships	2nd place, silver medalist(s)	22				
2015	National Youth Games	4					
2015	Olympic Hopes Cup	2nd place, silver medalist(s)	3rd place, bronze medalist(s)				
Senior
2016	Olympic Test Event		17				
2016	National Championships	3rd place, bronze medalist(s)	10				
2016	National Individual Championships		48				
2017	Stuttgart World Cup		6				
2017	National Championships	5	8				
2017	National Games	3rd place, bronze medalist(s)	10	7			7
2017	National Individual Championships			2nd place, silver medalist(s)		3rd place, bronze medalist(s)	1st place, gold medalist(s)
2018	Stuttgart World Cup		1st place, gold medalist(s)				
2018	National Championships		2nd place, silver medalist(s)			4	
2018	Asian Games	1st place, gold medalist(s)				3rd place, bronze medalist(s)	
2018	World Championships	3rd place, bronze medalist(s)				8	
2019	City of Jesolo Trophy	2nd place, silver medalist(s)	6			4	4
2019	National Championships	7	9				7
2020	American Cup		9				
2020	National Championships	6	7				
2020	Friendship & Solidarity Meet	1st place, gold medalist(s)					
2021	National Championships	7	2nd place, silver medalist(s)			5	4
2021	Olympic Games	7					
2021	National Games		5				4
2022
2022	Asian Championships	1st place, gold medalist(s)	1st place, gold medalist(s)			3rd place, bronze medalist(s)	
2022	National Championships	5	8				
2022	World Championships	6					
2023	World University Games	1st place, gold medalist(s)					7
2023	Asian Games	1st place, gold medalist(s)	4			4	1st place, gold medalist(s)
2024	DTB Pokal Mixed Cup	2nd place, silver medalist(s)					
