= Pyon Rye-yong =

North Korean artistic gymnast

- Born: 15 August 2001 (age 25) Pyongyang

Gymnastics career
- Discipline: Women's artistic gymnastics
- Country represented: North Korea
Medal record
Representing North Korea
Asian Games
Silver medal – second place	2018 Jakarta	Team
Bronze medal – third place	2018 Jakarta	Vault
Asian Championships
Silver medal – second place	2017 Bangkok	Team
Bronze medal – third place	2017 Bangkok	Vault
FIG World Cup
Event / 1st / 2nd / 3rd; Apparatus World Cup / 0 / 1 / 0

Pyon Rye-yong (born 15 August 2001) is a North Korean former artistic gymnast. She is the 2018 Asian Games vault bronze medalist and team silver medalist. She also won the vault bronze medal and team silver medal at the 2017 Asian Championships.

== Gymnastics career ==
Pyon made her international debut at the 2017 Asian Championships in Bangkok, where she helped the North Korean team win the silver medal behind China. In the vault final, she won a bronze medal behind Liu Jinru and teammate Kim Su-jong. Additionally, she finished fourth in the balance beam final and placed fifth in the all-around.

At the 2018 Doha World Cup, Pyon won a silver medal on the vault behind Uzbekistan's Oksana Chusovitina. She also competed on the uneven bars but did not advance into the final. She then represented North Korea at the 2018 Asian Games in Jakarta and competed on the vault and floor exercise in the team final to help North Korea win the silver medal. She advanced to the vault final and won the bronze medal, behind Yeo Seo-jeong and Chusovitina. Additionally, she advanced to the balance beam final, where she finished sixth. She competed in the all-around with the North Korean team that placed 16th in the qualifications at the 2018 World Championships in Doha. Individually, she advanced to the vault final in sixth place. In the final, she finished eighth after attempting an Amanar and falling.

Pyon competed on the vault at the 2019 Doha World Cup but finished 23rd in the qualifications and did not advance into the final. This was the final competition of her international career.
