= Luo Huan =

Chinese gymnast (born 2000)

- Full name: 罗欢 (Luo Huan)
- Born: 6 March 2000 (age 26)

Gymnastics career
- Discipline: Women's artistic gymnastics
- Country represented: China (2013–present)
- Head coaches: 張海燕 (Zhang haiyan), 周世平 (Zhou Shiping)
Medal record
Representing China
World Championships
Bronze medal – third place	2018 Doha	Team
Asian Games
Gold medal – first place	2018 Jakarta	Team
Silver medal – second place	2018 Jakarta	All-around
Silver medal – second place	2018 Jakarta	Uneven bars
Asian Championships
Gold medal – first place	2017 Bangkok	Team
Gold medal – first place	2017 Bangkok	Uneven bars
Silver medal – second place	2017 Bangkok	All-around
Silver medal – second place	2017 Bangkok	Balance beam
World University Games
Gold medal – first place	2021 Chengdu	Team
Silver medal – second place	2021 Chengdu	All-around
Silver medal – second place	2021 Chengdu	Balance beam
Bronze medal – third place	2021 Chengdu	Uneven bars
National Games
Gold medal – first place	2025 Guangdong	Team
Silver medal – second place	2013 Liaoning	Team

Luo Huan (simplified Chinese: 罗欢; traditional Chinese: 羅歡) is an elite Chinese gymnast. She is a two-time Chinese national all-around champion (2017, 2018) and the 2017 Asian and 2018 Asian Games all-around silver medalist. In her specialty events, she is the 2017 Asian and 2017 Chinese national uneven bars champion and the 2018 Chinese balance beam champion. She was a member of the Chinese women's gymnastics team that won the team bronze medal at the 2018 Artistic Gymnastics World Championships. Overall, she has won eleven medals at the Chinese Artistic Gymnastics Championships.

In 2024, Luo Huan became the oldest women's artistic gymnast to represent China in history when she competed at the 2024 Summer Olympics in Paris, France. She placed sixth with the Chinese team in the team all-around final.

== Junior gymnastics career ==
=== 2013 ===
Luo made her international elite debut at the Australian Youth Olympic Festival in January. There, she won gold with her team and silver in the uneven bars. In May, representing Zhejiang province at the senior-level Chinese Championships, she came in fourth with her team and eighth in bars. In September, she competed at the Chinese National Games, winning a team silver medal.

=== 2014 ===
Luo competed at the Pacific Rim Championships, winning the bronze medal with the Chinese team behind the United States and Canada. Individually, Luo recorded the fourth highest score in the junior all-around winning gold in bars, behind Americans Bailie Key, Nia Dennis, and Norah Flatley and narrowly ahead of teammate Liu Tingting. However, due to the two-per-country rule, she was awarded the bronze medal over Flatley. In the junior event finals, she won gold in the uneven bars, ahead of Key and Liu, and placed fourth in floor and eighth in vault. This competition was the first of many events throughout Liu and Luo's careers where they competed together, often placing closely in the all-around and event finals.

At the senior-level Chinese Championships in May, Luo and provincial teammate Huang Huidan led the Zhejiang team to the gold medal in the team competition. Luo was the only member of the team to contribute counting scores in all four events, including the second-highest score of the day in the balance beam behind Shang Chunsong. She then delivered a strong performance in the all-around final to finish in fourth place behind Yao Jinnan, Shang, and Wang Yan, with less than a tenth of a point between her and the podium. She finished first among all junior participants, and once again recorded the second-highest beam score behind Shang. In event finals, she placed fourth in the uneven bars behind Yao, Shang, and Huang, and sixth in the balance beam.

In November, Luo competed at the Chinese Individual National Championships as one of the top names, given the absence of the senior members of the World Championships team. She won gold in the all-around, her first all-around title, and in uneven bars.

=== 2015 ===
In June, Luo competed at the Chinese Championships on the senior level. She qualified to the all-around, uneven bars, and floor exercise finals and was the second reserve for the balance beam final. In the team final, the Zhejiang team placed fourth. Luo individually placed seventh in the all-around, a tenth behind top junior scorer Liu Tingting. She placed seventh in the uneven bars final after falling, but placed third in the floor exercise final behind seniors Wang Yan and Shang Chunsong, winning her first individual medal at the senior championships. Liu's final junior-level competition came in October at the Chinese National Youth Games. Representing the city of Ningbo in Zhejiang, Luo won a gold medal with her junior provincial team and placed fourth in the all-around behind Liu Tingting, Wang Cenyu, and Lu Yufei. She also placed fourth in floor exercise and fifth in balance beam.

== Senior gymnastics career ==
=== 2016: Debut ===
Luo made her senior international debut at the Doha World Challenge Cup in late March, competing only in balance beam. She qualified into the event final but ended up placing after falling on her Onodi and putting her hands down on her double pike dismount.

In May, Luo competed for the first time as a senior at the Chinese Championships. She placed fifth representing Zhejiang in the team final, and also placed fifth in the all-around final. However, without a clear standout event (she did not make any event finals), she was not named to the 2016 Olympic team, instead being selected as an alternate. She won her first senior all-around title later that year at the Chinese Individual National Championships in October.

=== 2017 ===
Luo began her season by competing at the Melbourne World Cup in February alongside Wang Yan and Liu Tingting. She qualified first into the bars final and second into the beam final behind Liu. In the bars final, a mistake on her Ling pirouette caused her to finish in second behind Liu, and in beam she placed fourth behind Liu, reigning Olympic Champion Sanne Wevers of the Netherlands, and Emily Little of Australia after falling on her dismount. A month later, she competed at the Doha World Cup, once again alongside Wang and Liu. She qualified in first place to the uneven bars final and in fourth place to the balance beam final. She placed first in uneven bars with a strong routine ahead of Zsófia Kovács of Hungary and Georgia-Rose Brown of Australia, winning her first senior international gold medal. She then improved on her qualifications ranking to take the bronze medal in the balance beam final behind teammate Liu and 2004 Olympic Champion Cătălina Ponor of Romania.

In May, Luo competed at her fifth consecutive Chinese Championships at the senior level. As an Olympic alternate and a recent World Cup champion, she entered the meet as one of the top contenders for several medals along with Olympians Shang Chunsong, Wang Yan, and Fan Yilin, as well as Liu Tingting and fellow Olympic alternate Liu Jinru. In qualifications, Luo topped the all-around standings; she also qualified into the uneven bars final in third place behind Zhu Xiaofang and reigning World Champion Fan, the balance beam final in first place, and the floor exercise final in fifth place. In the team final, Luo's Zhejiang provincial team placed fourth.

Luo placed first in the all-around final, a point ahead of junior Chen Yile and 1.5 points ahead of Liu Jingxing. During the final, she recorded top-three scores in each event: second in vault behind Zhang Jin, second in bars behind Du Siyu, first in beam, and third in floor behind Chen and Liu Jingxing. She was crowned Chinese national champion. She then won the national championship in bars ahead of Du and Fan Yilin, and also placed sixth in beam and fourth in floor.

Two weeks later, Luo competed at her first major senior international meet, the Asian Championships in Bangkok, Thailand, alongside Liu Tingting, Liu Jinru, and Tan Jiaxin. In the qualification round, which also served as the team and individual all-around finals, Luo competed in all four events. Along with Liu, she contributed counting scores in all four events towards the Chinese team's first-place finish, and individually won the silver all-around medal behind Liu. She earned the second highest scores in uneven bars and balance beam, both behind Liu, and the third highest score in floor exercise behind Liu and Kim Su-jong of North Korea. In event finals, she won the gold medal in uneven bars ahead of Liu, the silver medal in balance beam behind Liu, and placed fourth in floor exercise in a tie with Liu.

In early September, the nominative Chinese team for the World Championships in Montreal, Canada was announced, including national champion Luo and Asian champion Liu Tingting as all-around competitors, with Olympian specialists Wang Yan and Fan Yilin also on the team. Days later, Luo performed at the National Games, a quadrennial multi-sport competition with over 10,000 participating athletes. Luo's provincial team qualified into the team final in third place, and Luo qualified in fourth place to the all-around final behind junior Chen Yile, Liu, and Wang. She also qualified in second place to the uneven bars final behind Fan and fourth into the balance beam final behind Liu, Chen, and Wang. In the team final, Luo competed in all four events, but errors including a fall from Luo in balance beam left the Zhejiang team in fifth place. Luo then tied with Wang for the third highest score in the all-around final, but lost the bronze medal in a tiebreaker, tying with Shang Chunsong for the highest bars score of the day and scoring second in beam behind Liu. Following three straight all-around performances (qualifications, team final, all-around final) Liu competed in the uneven bars final, where an error on her piked Jaeger dropped her to sixth place. She withdrew from the balance beam final in favor of her junior provincial teammate Li Qi, who won the gold medal.

While Luo was originally supposed to compete in the all-around at the World Championships in October, an injury in training limited her to compete in only the uneven bars in qualifications. She qualified to the uneven bars final and ultimately placed seventh with a hit routine.

=== 2018 ===
Luo began her season at the Baku World Cup in March. She qualified in first place to the beam final and second place behind teammate Lv Jiaqi to the bars final. She repeated her placement in both events in the finals, winning a gold and silver medal.

Luo competed at the Chinese Championships in May, once again representing Zhejiang province. As the defending all-around and uneven bars champion, she was expected to contend for multiple medals. In qualification, she qualified into the all-around final in fourth place, the uneven bars final in third place, and the team final in third place. While she recorded the ninth highest score in balance beam, she advanced to the final following the exclusion of Zhao Shiting due to the two-per-province rule. In the team final, Luo and junior provincial teammate Guan Chenchen competed in all four events to lead Zhejiang to the bronze medal, returning to the podium for the first time in five years. Luo earned the second-highest score in uneven bars of the day behind Liu Tingting.

In the all-around final, Luo improved on her score in qualifications by over a point to repeat as national champion ahead of Zhang Jin and Tang Xijing. She recorded the highest score in uneven bars and tied with Tang and Zhao Shiting for the highest score in balance beam among all competitors. Her victory made her the third consecutive Chinese champion with back-to-back national titles, following Yao Jinnan and Shang Chunsong. In event finals, she continued to perform well, claiming the national title in balance beam ahead of silver medalists Chen Yile and Guan Chenchen, and winning the silver medal in uneven bars behind Lv Jiaqi and ahead of Chen. With four medals total, Luo was the most decorated female gymnast of the championships.

In August, she was initially named as an alternate to the Asian Games team of Chen Yile, Liu Tingting, Zhang Jin, Liu Jinru, and Li Qi, but was called in to compete when Li pulled out with an injury. In the qualification round, which also served as the all-around final, Luo performed strong routines in vault, uneven bars, and balance beam, but put her hands down on her final double pike pass in the floor exercise. Despite this error, she helped China qualify to the team final in first place, and individually won the silver-medal in the all-around behind Chen and ahead of Kim Su-jong. She qualified in second place to the uneven bars final behind Liu and recorded the third highest score in balance beam behind Chen and Zhang, but did not qualify into the final due to the two-per-country rule.

In the team final, Luo competed only in vault and uneven bars, contributing to China's team gold medal. In the uneven bars final, she performed a strong routine to win the silver medal behind teammate Liu Tingting and ahead of North Korean Jon Jang Mi. Luo's team gold and two individual silver medals made her the third most decorated female artistic gymnast of the Games, behind Kim Su-jong (four medals) and teammate Chen Yile (three gold medals).

In October, Luo was named to the Chinese team for the World Championships in Doha, Qatar along with the other members of the Asian Games team (Chen Yile, Liu Tingting, Zhang Jin, and Liu Jinru) as well as alternate Du Siyu. In qualifications, Luo competed in the all-around along with Chen and Zhang. She qualified into the all-around final in ninth place ahead of Chen and into the uneven bars final in fourth place, and qualified with the Chinese team in third place into the team final. In the team final, Luo competed in uneven bars, where she delivered the fourth-highest score of the day, and in vault, similar to her contribution at the Asian Games. However, she also stepped in to compete floor exercise following Liu Jinru's struggles in qualification on the apparatus, delivering a clean routine to help lead China to the bronze medal behind the United States and Russia. This marked Luo's first medal at the World Championships.

In the all-around final, Luo hit all four of her routines to place ninth. She performed strongly in uneven bars and balance beam, recording the fifth-highest and seventh-highest scores, respectively, but was held back by lower scores in the other two events. Of the top twelve competitors, only Luo, Chen Yile, and Nina Derwael competed a full-twisting Yurchenko vault, with the other nine competitors performing significantly more difficult vaults including the double-twisting Yurchenko (Baitova), the handspring layout full, the handspring layout 1.5 (Chusovitina) and the roundoff half-turn layout double full (Biles). Luo also placed the lowest in floor exercise of the top twelve competitors. In the uneven bars final, Luo performed a strong routine and placed fourth behind Derwael, Simone Biles, and Elisabeth Seitz, ultimately missing the podium by one tenth.

=== 2019 ===
Unlike the previous three seasons, Luo did not compete internationally prior to beginning her season in May at the Chinese Championships, her seventh consecutive appearance at the event. As the reigning national all-around champion and returning World team member, expectations were high. Luo qualified in third place to the all-around final behind Liu Tingting and junior competitor Ou Yushan, to the uneven bars behind Fan Yilin and Liu, and to the balance beam final behind juniors Ou and Luo Rui, and Luo's Zhejiang provincial team advanced to the team final. Like the year prior, Luo and junior provincial teammate Guan Chenchen contributed scores in all four events in the team final to lead Zhejiang to its second consecutive team bronze medal. Luo once again recorded the third-highest uneven bars score behind Fan and Liu, and tied with Guan for the fifth-highest floor exercise score.

In the all-around final, Luo performed consistently to improve on her qualifications ranking and win the silver medal behind Liu by a margin of one point. She narrowly overtook Ou, who ranked second in qualifications, by recording the second-highest uneven bars score, once again behind Liu. She also placed fourth in floor exercise behind Qi Qi, Tang Xijing, and Ou, and tied with Li Shijia for fifth in beam. Her silver all-around made her the only gymnast to place in the top five at every national championship since 2016. She competed in her third consecutive national uneven bars and balance beam event finals, but made errors in both and was not credited with her full difficulty on either apparatus. She finished fifth in both finals.

In June, Luo was assigned to compete at the Korea Cup alongside Qian Xuejia. She won the silver medal in bars behind Lee Yunseo of South Korea after a mistake in her routine, but rallied to win gold in the beam final with the highest difficulty score and gold in the floor final with the highest execution score. She also debuted several upgraded dance elements in her floor routine.

Despite her performance at the two previous competitions and a sixth-place finish at the final selection camp, Luo was not named to the team for the World Championships in Stuttgart, Germany in September. Instead, seventh-place finisher Zhang Jin was named as the traveling alternate for the six-member team.

=== 2020 ===
Luo returned to training on the Zhejiang provincial team after a foot injury during the COVID-19 pandemic. While she competed at her eighth consecutive Chinese National Championships in September, her injury limited her to competing only downgraded routines in uneven bars and balance beam, where she did not qualify to either event final. Nevertheless, she won her eleventh national medal as the Zhejiang team won bronze thanks to a strong all-around performance from Guan Chenchen.

== Competitive history ==
Year	Event	Team	AA	VT	UB	BB	FX
Junior
2013	Australian Youth Olympic Festival	1st place, gold medalist(s)			2nd place, silver medalist(s)		
2013	National Championships	4			8		
2013	National Games	2nd place, silver medalist(s)			8		
2014	Pacific Rim Championships (Junior)	3rd place, bronze medalist(s)	3rd place, bronze medalist(s)	8	1st place, gold medalist(s)		4
2014	National Championships	1st place, gold medalist(s)	4		4	6	
2014	Individual National Championships		1st place, gold medalist(s)		1st place, gold medalist(s)		
2015	National Championships	4	7		7		3rd place, bronze medalist(s)
2015	National Youth Games	1st place, gold medalist(s)	4			5	4
Senior
2016	Doha World Challenge Cup					8	
2016	National Championships	5	5				
2016	Individual National Championships		1st place, gold medalist(s)				
2017	Melbourne World Cup				2nd place, silver medalist(s)	4	
2017	Doha World Cup				1st place, gold medalist(s)	3rd place, bronze medalist(s)	
2017	National Championships	4	1st place, gold medalist(s)		1st place, gold medalist(s)	6	4
2017	Asian Championships	1st place, gold medalist(s)	2nd place, silver medalist(s)		1st place, gold medalist(s)	2nd place, silver medalist(s)	4
2017	National Games	5	4		6		
2017	World Championships				7		
2018	Baku World Cup				2nd place, silver medalist(s)	1st place, gold medalist(s)	
2018	National Championships	3rd place, bronze medalist(s)	1st place, gold medalist(s)		2nd place, silver medalist(s)	1st place, gold medalist(s)	
2018	Asian Games	1st place, gold medalist(s)	2nd place, silver medalist(s)		2nd place, silver medalist(s)		
2018	World Championships	3rd place, bronze medalist(s)	9		4		
2019	National Championships	3rd place, bronze medalist(s)	2nd place, silver medalist(s)		5	5	
2019	Korea Cup				2nd place, silver medalist(s)	1st place, gold medalist(s)	1st place, gold medalist(s)
2020	National Championships	3rd place, bronze medalist(s)					
2020	Individual National Championships				4		6
2023	World University Games	1st place, gold medalist(s)	2nd place, silver medalist(s)		3rd place, bronze medalist(s)	2nd place, silver medalist(s)	
2024	Cairo World Cup				2nd place, silver medalist(s)		
2024	Olympic Games	6					
2025	National Games	1st place, gold medalist(s)					
