= Kim Su-jong =

North Korean artistic gymnast (born 2000)

- Born: 28 September 2000 (age 25) Pyongyang, North Korea
- Height: 149 cm (4 ft 11 in)

Gymnastics career
- Discipline: Women's artistic gymnastics
- Country represented: North Korea
Medal record
Women's artistic gymnastics
Representing North Korea
Asian Games
Gold medal – first place	2018 Jakarta	Floor exercise
Silver medal – second place	2018 Jakarta	Team
Silver medal – second place	2018 Jakarta	Balance beam
Bronze medal – third place	2018 Jakarta	All-around
Bronze medal – third place	2022 Hangzhou	Team
Bronze medal – third place	2022 Hangzhou	All-around
Asian Gymnastics Championships
Gold medal – first place	2017 Bangkok	Floor exercise
Silver medal – second place	2017 Bangkok	Team
Silver medal – second place	2017 Bangkok	Vault
Bronze medal – third place	2017 Bangkok	All-around

Korean name
- Hangul: 김수정
- RR: Gim Sujeong
- MR: Kim Sujŏng

Kim Su-jong (Korean: 김수정; born 28 September 2000) is a North Korean artistic gymnast. She is the 2018 Asian Games floor exercise champion, balance beam silver medalist, and all-around bronze medalist. At the 2017 Asian Championships, she won a gold medal on the floor exercise, silver medals with the team and on the vault, and a bronze medal in the all-around. She is also the 2022 Asian Games all-around bronze medalist. She qualified to represent North Korea at the 2020 Summer Olympics, but the country withdrew.

== Gymnastics career ==
Kim began gymnastics when she was seven years old after being identified in a government talent identification programme.

Kim made her international debut at the 2017 Asian Championships in Bangkok. She helped the North Korean team win the silver medal behind China, and she won the bronze medal in the all-around behind Liu Tingting and Luo Huan. In the vault final, she won the silver medal behind Liu Jinru. She fell in the uneven bars final and finished eighth. Then in the floor exercise final, she tied with Japan's Honoka Koga for the gold medal.

Kim won a gold medal on the floor exercise at the 2018 Doha World Cup in a three-way tie with Axelle Klinckaert and Elisa Meneghini. She then represented North Korea at the 2018 Asian Games and helped them win the team silver medal behind China. She won the all-around bronze medal behind Chen Yile and Luo Han. She qualified for all four event finals– finishing sixth in the vault final and eighth in the uneven bars final. She then won the silver medal in the balance beam final behind Chen, and she won the gold medal on the floor exercise.

Kim competed with the North Korean team that placed 16th at the 2018 World Championships. Then at the 2019 World Championships, she helped North Korea finish 20th, and she was the third reserve for the vault final. Additionally, she finished 50th in the all-around qualifications and earned a berth for the 2020 Summer Olympics. However, she was not able to compete at the Olympic Games because North Korea withdrew– citing COVID-19 concerns.

Kim represented North Korea at the 2022 Asian Games, helping the team win the bronze medal behind China and Japan. She then won her second consecutive Asian Games all-around bronze medal, behind Zuo Tong and Mana Okamura. She finished fourth in the uneven bars final, sixth in the balance beam final, and sixth in the floor exercise final.
