= Yuki Uchiyama (gymnast) =

Japanese artistic gymnast

- Born: 13 January 1998 (age 28) Tokyo, Japan
- Height: 160 cm (5 ft 3 in)

Gymnastics career
- Discipline: Women's artistic gymnastics
- Country represented: Japan; (2011–2018)
- Club: Smile GC
Medal record
Asian Games
Bronze medal – third place	2018 Jakarta	Team
Asian Championships
Gold medal – first place	2015 Hiroshima	Team
Summer Universiade
Bronze medal – third place	2017 Taipei	Team

Yuki Uchiyama (内山 由綺, Uchiyama Yuki) is a Japanese former artistic gymnast. She won bronze medals in the team competitions at the 2018 Asian Games and the 2017 Summer Universiade. She competed with the team that finished fourth at the 2016 Summer Olympics.

== Gymnastics career ==
Uchiyama began gymnastics in first grade because her mother was a coach and former competitor at the university level. Her mother owns Smile Gymnastics Club, but the club did not have its own gym, so Uchiyama trained at various gyms throughout Tokyo. At the junior level, she competed at the 2012 Pacific Rim Championships, finishing sixth in the all-around, fifth on the vault and balance beam, and fourth on the floor exercise. At the 2013 International Gymnix, she won the bronze medal in the junior all-around, behind Russians Anastasia Dmitrieva and Maria Bondareva. She then won the gold medal in the uneven bars final and another bronze medal in the floor exercise final.

Uchiyama became age-eligible for senior international competition in 2014 but missed most of the season due to injury. She won the silver medal in the all-around at the 2015 All-Japan Championships. She then competed with the team that won the gold medal at the 2015 Asian Championships, where she also finished fifth in the uneven bars final. She was named to the team for the 2015 World Championships but withdrew three days before the competition due to a heel injury.

After finishing fourth in the all-around at both the 2016 All-Japan Championships and the NHK Trophy, Uchiyama was selected to represent Japan at the 2016 Summer Olympics. In the qualification round, she competed on the uneven bars and balance beam to help the team advance to the final in sixth place. In the team final, she contributed the team's highest score on the uneven bars, helping Japan finish fourth.

Uchiyama represented Japan at the 2017 Summer Universiade and won a bronze medal with the team. There, she also advanced to the uneven bars final and finished fourth. At the 2018 Asian Games, she helped Japan win the bronze medal in the team final, and she placed fourth in the uneven bars final.

Although Uchiyama did not receive an international assignment after 2018, she continued to compete in domestic competitions until announcing her retirement in 2023.

== Personal life ==
Uchiyama's father died in August 2020. She got married in October 2025 in a small ceremony on Miyako Island. Since her retirement, she has worked as a gymnastics coach.
