= Chen Yile =

Chinese gymnast

- 陈一乐
- Full name: Chen Yile
- Nickname: Lele
- Born: 5 January 2002 (age 24) Jiangxi, China

Gymnastics career
- Discipline: Women's artistic gymnastics
- Country represented: China; (2017–2021)
- Head coach: 王策群 (Wang Qunce)、徐惊雷 (Xu Jinglei)
Medal record
Representing China
World Championships
Bronze medal – third place	2018 Doha	Team
Asian Games
Gold medal – first place	2018 Jakarta	Team
Gold medal – first place	2018 Jakarta	All-Around
Gold medal – first place	2018 Jakarta	Balance Beam
National Games
Gold medal – first place	2017 Tianjin	Team
Gold medal – first place	2017 Tianjin	All-Around
Silver medal – second place	2017 Tianjin	Balance Beam
Silver medal – second place	2017 Tianjin	Floor Exercise

Chen Yile (simplified Chinese: 陈一乐; traditional Chinese: 陳一樂, born 5 January 2002) is an elite Chinese female artistic gymnast. She is the 2018 Asian all-around and balance beam champion, and the 2017 Asian junior all-around and uneven bars champion. She was a member of the team that won the bronze medal at the 2018 World Artistic Gymnastics Championships. Chen stars in the Olympic Channel documentary series "All Around", along with American gymnast Morgan Hurd and Russian gymnast Angelina Melnikova. The series shows her training and daily life as a 2020 Olympic hopeful.

== Career ==
=== Junior ===
Chen began gymnastics in 2010 at age eight, after being impressed by Yang Yilin's performance in the 2008 Beijing Olympics. Chen joined the national team in 2017. She competed at the 2017 Junior Asian Championships held in Bangkok, Thailand from May 16–21. At the Junior Asian Championships, Chen won all-around gold with a score of 55.000. Additionally, she won uneven bars gold (14.150), floor exercise silver (13.200) and balance beam bronze (12.925). She shared the podium with teammate Li Qi for floor and beam; Li was first on both events. Chen contributed to China's first-place finish as a team, scoring 161.100 alongside teammates Li Qi, Guo Fangting, Liu Jieyu, and Zhou Ruiyu.

=== Senior: 2018–2020 ===
Chen won three gold medals at the 2018 Asian Games – team, all-around, and balance beam. She shared the all-around podium with teammate Luo Huan, who won silver. In event finals Chen scored 14.600 on balance beam, winning the gold. She placed third in uneven bars qualifications, behind teammates Liu Tingting and Luo Huan, but she was did not qualify for the final due to the two-per-country limitations. She placed fifth in the floor exercise finals. She was recognized as "Best Female Athlete at the 2018 Asian Games" in October 2019.

In October at the 2018 Doha World Championships, Chen won a team bronze medal. She was seventh in the all-around, with a score of 54.632.

At the 2019 Stuttgart World Championships, Chen and her teammates - Liu Tingting, Tang Xijing, Li Shijia, and Qi Qi - posted the second best team total on the first day of qualifications, but finished fourth in the final. This was the first time since 2003 that China did not reach the podium in the team event.

After the Tokyo 2020 Olympics were postponed due to the COVID-19 pandemic, Chen expressed her continuing motivation to train; however she ultimately did not make the Olympic team.

== Personal life ==
Chen enjoys drawing as a hobby. She has a younger sister, FeiFei, and an older brother, Feiyue.

== Competitive history ==
Year	Event	Team	AA	VT	UB	BB	FX
Junior
2017	National Championships	1st place, gold medalist(s)	2nd place, silver medalist(s)		5	7	
2017	Asian Championships	1st place, gold medalist(s)	1st place, gold medalist(s)		1st place, gold medalist(s)	3rd place, bronze medalist(s)	2nd place, silver medalist(s)
2017	National Games	1st place, gold medalist(s)	1st place, gold medalist(s)		5	2nd place, silver medalist(s)	2nd place, silver medalist(s)
2017	Junior Japan International		3rd place, bronze medalist(s)		1st place, gold medalist(s)	6	5
Senior
2018	Melbourne World Cup				2nd place, silver medalist(s)	1st place, gold medalist(s)	
2018	National Championships	1st place, gold medalist(s)	WD		3rd place, bronze medalist(s)	2nd place, silver medalist(s)	
2018	Asian Games	1st place, gold medalist(s)	1st place, gold medalist(s)			1st place, gold medalist(s)	5
2018	World Championships	3rd place, bronze medalist(s)	7				
2019
2019	World Championships	4					
2020	National Championships	1st place, gold medalist(s)					
2021	National Championships	1st place, gold medalist(s)					
