= Vivekananda Byamagar =

Coordinates: 23.82741°N 91.27500°E

Vivekananda Byamagar (Bengali: বিবেকানন্দ ব্যায়ামাগার) is a gymnasium, located in Agartala, Tripura, India. It is the oldest gymnasium in Agartala. It was the work-place of legendary gymnastics coach Dalip Singh. It has produced many notable gymnasts such as Mantu Debnath, Bharat Kishore Debbarman, N. N. Dey, Balaram Shil, Madhusudan Saha, Lopamudra Ghosh, Ratan Debnath, Manika Debnath, Kalpana Debnath, Bishweshwar Nandi, Apu Shil, Dipa Karmakar and others.
