= Gymnastics in India =

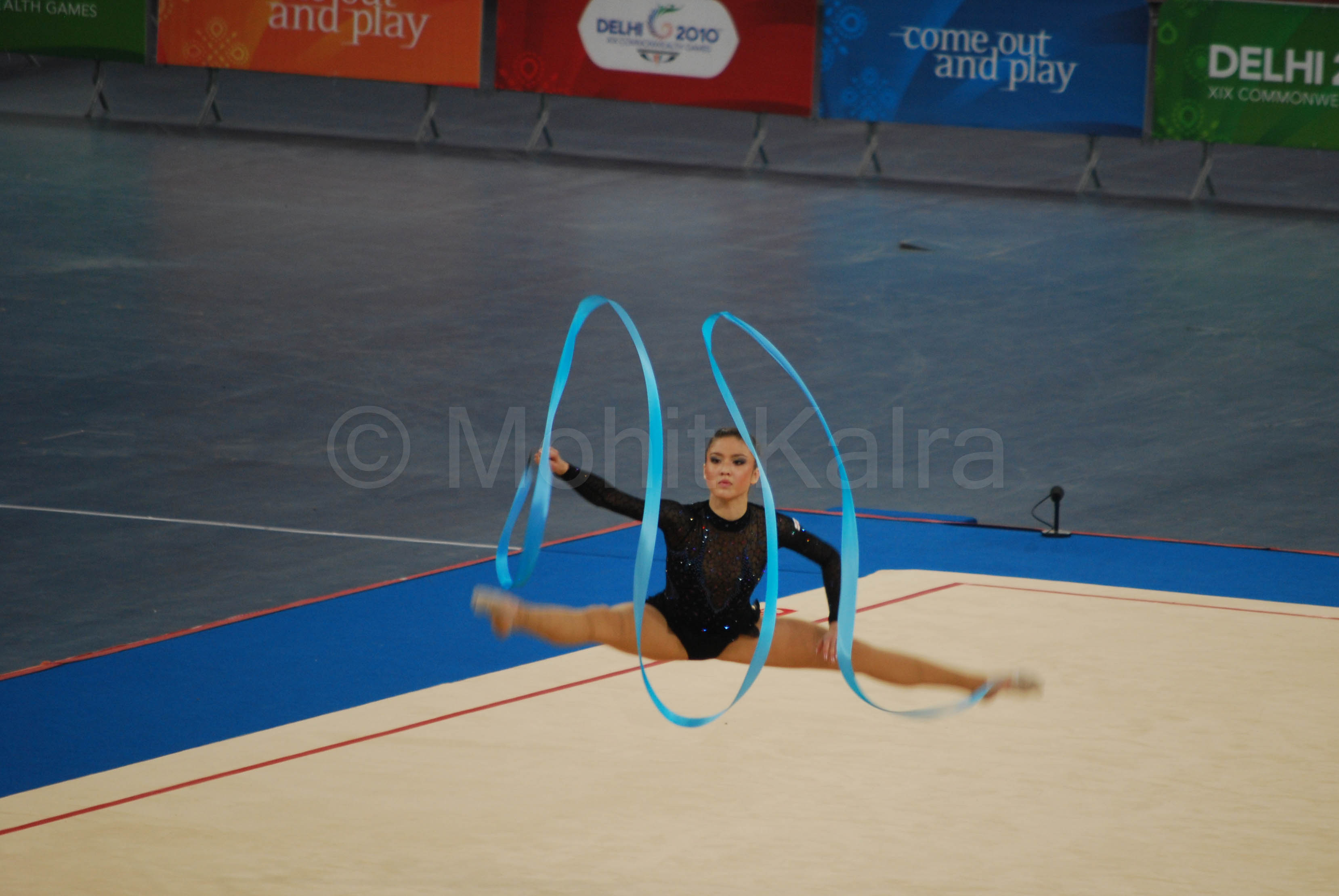
- Gymnastics in Delhi
- Governing body: Gymnastics Federation of India

Gymnastics came of age in India, when at the 2010 Commonwealth Games, Ashish Kumar won the first-ever medal in gymnastics, he won a bronze medal. However, soon after the win, the President of the Gymnastics Federation of India asked Ashish's Chief Coach from the Soviet Union, Vladimir Chertkov: "Is this all that you can deliver, a bronze?" The comment was widely reported in the press.

Later, the coach revealed that "In August 2009, we had no equipment. Ashish trained on hard floor till February 2010, and then we got equipment around 20 years old." Also, the Federation announced that no Indian team would travel to Rotterdam for the World Championships in October, which meant that Indian gymnasts automatically would not qualify as a team for the 2012 Summer Olympics. Ashish also won a silver medal in the Men's vault at 2010 Commonwealth Games.

It was Glasgow 2014 Commonwealth Games, from where India's path in gymnastics started taking shape slowly, when Dipa Karmakar from Tripura, a small state of India, went on to win a bronze medal in the Women's vault finale and performed the Produnova vault with a score of 15.1 (D-7, Ex- 8.1). With this attempt she became the fifth gymnast to ever execute the Produnova, just after legendary gymnast Oksana Chusovitina, who executed it multiples times. In October 2015, Karmakar became the first Indian gymnast to qualify for a final stage at the World Artistic Gymnastics Championships. Later in 2016 when she qualified for Rio Olympics, she became the first Indian gymnast to do so and also hours after her qualification at 2016 Gymnastics Olympic Test Event she clinched a gold medal in the Women's vault event stunning Oksana Chusovitina with her Prudunova again who came second to her. On 6 July 2016, FIG honored Dipa by naming her World Class Gymnast. At Rio Olympics, she achieved 4th place in vaults. After a long break due to injury when she ran for vaults and landed with a gold at World Challenge Cup series. Her medal is one of the first medals won by any Indian at the Artistic Gymnastics World Cup, second only to Aruna Reddy's bronze for individual vaults at FIG Artistic Gymnastics World Cup Melbourne.

== Total medals won by Indian Gymnasts in Major tournaments ==
Competition	Gold	Silver	Bronze	Total
World Cup	1	0	1	2
Asian Games	0	0	1	1
Commonwealth Games	0	1	2	3
Asian Championships	1	0	4	5
Total	2	1	8	11

- updated till 31st July, 2024

== Notable Performance at Summer Olympics ==
Year	Event	Player	Result
2016
2016	Women's vault	Dipa Karmakar	4th

=== List of National Sports award recipients in Gymnastics, showing the year, award, and gender ===
Year	Recipient	Award	Gender
2016	Dipa Karmakar	Rajiv Gandhi Khel Ratna	Female
1961	Sham Lal	Arjuna Award	Male
1975	Mantu Debnath	Arjuna Award	Male
1985	Sunita Sharma	Arjuna Award	Female
1989	Krupali Patel	Arjuna Award	Female
2000	Kalpana Debnath ^{+}	Arjuna Award	Female
2011	Ashish Kumar	Arjuna Award	Male
2015	Dipa Karmakar	Arjuna Award	Female
2011	Devender Kumar Rathore	Dronacharya Award	Male
2016	Bishweshwar Nandi	Dronacharya Award	Male

Key
+ Indicates a Lifetime contribution honour

== Notable gymnasts ==
- Sham Lal
- Mantu Debnath
- Sunita Sharma
- Krupali Patel
- Kalpana Debnath
- Ashish Kumar
- Dipa Karmakar
- Pranati Nayak

== Notable coaches ==
- Dalip Singh
- Bishweshwar Nandi
