= Zoé Allaire-Bourgie =

Canadian artistic gymnast

- Born: 27 September 2004 (age 21) Bangkok, Thailand
- Height: 1.57 m (5 ft 2 in)

Gymnastics career
- Discipline: Women's artistic gymnastics
- Country represented: Canada; (2017–20)
- Club: Club Gymnix
- Head coach: Katerine Dussault
- Assistant coaches: Pierre Privé; Francine Bouffard
- Retired: June 19, 2021
Medal record
Artistic gymnastics
Representing Canada
Junior Pan American Championships
Gold medal – first place	2018 Buenos Aires	Balance Beam
Silver medal – second place	2018 Buenos Aires	Team
Silver medal – second place	2018 Buenos Aires	All-Around
Bronze medal – third place	2018 Buenos Aires	Uneven Bars

Zoé Allaire-Bourgie (born September 27, 2004) is a retired Canadian artistic gymnast and is the 2018 Junior Pan-American gold medalist on balance beam.

== Early life ==
Zoé Allaire-Bourgie was born in Bangkok, Thailand in 2004. At eight months old she was adopted by a Canadian couple, mother Dominique Allaire and father Guy Bourgie, who are social worker and child care worker. She has two older brothers, Guillaume and Laurent.

== Gymnastics career ==
=== 2017 ===
In February Allaire-Bourgie competed at Elite Canada where she placed fifth in the all-around and won silver on uneven bars and floor excise, both behind Ana Padurariu. In March she competed at International Gymnix in Montreal where she won silver on the balance beam behind Gabby Perea of the United States and she helped Canada finish fourth in the team final. In April Allaire-Bourgie competed at the 2017 City of Jesolo Trophy where she placed 21st in the all-around, fifth on balance beam, and eighth on floor exercise. Canada finished seventh in the team final. In May she competed at the Canadian Championships where she placed sixth in the all-around. Allaire-Bourgie ended the season competing at Elite Gym Massilia. She placed ninth in the masters all-around and fourth in the open all-around. For event finals she placed third on vault and fourth on uneven bars.

=== 2018 ===
In February she competed at Elite Canada where she placed fourth on vault and first on balance beam. In March Allaire-Bourgie competed at International Gymnix where she won gold in the all-around, ahead of Asia D'Amato of Italy. During event finals she placed fourth on vault, second on uneven bars behind Elena Gerasimova of Russia, first on balance beam ahead of Elisa Iorio of Italy, and fifth on floor exercise. Allaire-Bourgie was later selected to represent Canada at the 2018 Pacific Rim Gymnastics Championships. While there she helped Canada win silver in the team final. In the all-around she won bronze behind Americans Jordan Bowers and Kayla DiCello. During event finals she placed sixth on vault, second on uneven bars behind diCello, first on balance beam, and third on floor exercise behind Bowers and Sunisa Lee of the United States. At the Canadian Championships in May Allaire-Bourgie won gold in the all-around ahead of Emma Spence. In June Allaire-Bourgie represented Canada at the 2018 Junior Pan American Artistic Gymnastics Championships. She won silver in the all-around behind Bowers and help Canada place second. In event finals she won bronze on uneven bars behind Bowers and Leanne Wong of the United States, won gold on balance beam, and placed fourth on floor exercise.

=== 2019 ===
Allaire-Bourgie competed at Elite Canada amongst senior level gymnasts, even though she was still a junior. She placed third in the all-around behind Ana Padurariu and Ellie Black and placed third on uneven bars once again behind Padurariu and Black. She also placed fourth on balance beam behind Padurariu, Black, and Laurie-Lou Vézina, and placed sixth on floor exercise. In March she competed at the 2019 L'International Gymnix. She helped Canada win the bronze medal behind the United States and Belgium. Individually Allaire-Bourgie won gold in the all-around ahead of American Olivia Greaves. During event finals she placed fourth on vault, second on uneven bars behind American Skye Blakely, second on balance beam behind Noémie Louon, and won gold on floor exercise. In May Allaire-Bourgie competed at the Canadian National Championships, once again amongst the senior gymnasts. After the first day of competition she was in fourth place in the all-around behind Padurariu, Black, and Brooklyn Moors. On the second day, Allaire-Bourgie withdrew from the competition after injuring her ACL. As a result of the injury, Allaire-Bourgie was unable to compete at the inaugural Junior World Championships.

=== 2020–21 ===
Allaire-Bourgie became age-eligible for senior level competition in 2020 and had intended to make her senior debut at the City of Jesolo Trophy. However the competition was canceled due to the COVID-19 pandemic in Italy. Allaire-Bourgie was also intending to compete at the Pan American Championships in May to help Canada qualify an additional Olympic spot, but it was postponed along with all other continental championships due to the worldwide COVID-19 pandemic.

On June 19, 2021, Allaire-Bourgie announced her retirement from the sport of gymnastics on her Instagram.

== Competitive history ==
Competitive history of Zoé Allaire-Bourgie
Year	Event	Team	AA	VT	UB	BB	FX
2017	Elite Canada		5		2nd place, silver medalist(s)		2nd place, silver medalist(s)
2017	International Gymnix	4				2nd place, silver medalist(s)	
2017	City of Jesolo Trophy	7	21			5	8
2017	Canadian Championships		6				
2017	Elite Gym Massilia		9	3rd place, bronze medalist(s)	4		
2018	Elite Canada			4		1st place, gold medalist(s)	
2018	International Gymnix		1st place, gold medalist(s)	4	2nd place, silver medalist(s)	1st place, gold medalist(s)	5
2018	Pacific Rim Championships	2nd place, silver medalist(s)	3rd place, bronze medalist(s)	6	2nd place, silver medalist(s)	1st place, gold medalist(s)	3rd place, bronze medalist(s)
2018	Canadian Championships		2nd place, silver medalist(s)		3rd place, bronze medalist(s)	2nd place, silver medalist(s)	
2018	Pan American Championships	2nd place, silver medalist(s)	2nd place, silver medalist(s)		3rd place, bronze medalist(s)	1st place, gold medalist(s)	4
2019	Elite Canada		3rd place, bronze medalist(s)		3rd place, bronze medalist(s)	4	4
2019	International Gymnix	3rd place, bronze medalist(s)	1st place, gold medalist(s)	4	2nd place, silver medalist(s)	2nd place, silver medalist(s)	1st place, gold medalist(s)
