= Gymnastics at the 2019 Pan American Games – Women's balance beam =

Women's balance beam at the 2019 Pan American Games
- Venue: Polideportivo Villa el Salvador
- Dates: July 31
- Competitors: 8 from 6 nations
- Winning score: 15.233

Medalists
Gold medal	Kara Eaker	United States
Silver medal	Ellie Black	Canada
Bronze medal	Riley McCusker	United States

The women's balance beam gymnastic event at the 2019 Pan American Games was held on July 31 at the Polideportivo Villa el Salvador.

== Schedule ==
All times are Eastern Standard Time (UTC-3).

Date	Time	Round
July 31, 2019	14:00	Final

== Results ==
=== Qualification ===
Women's balance beam qualification results
Rank	Gymnast	D Score	E Score	Pen.	Total	Qual.
1	Kara Eaker (USA)	6.400	8.450		14.850	Q
2	Riley McCusker (USA)	5.900	8.350		14.250	Q
3	Leanne Wong (USA)	5.500	8.150		13.650	–
4	Morgan Hurd (USA)	5.300	7.800		13.100	–
5	Danusia Francis (JAM)	5.000	7.950		12.950	Q
6	Fabiola Diaz (PER)	5.100	7.850		12.950	Q
7	Ellie Black (CAN)	5.600	7.350		12.950	Q
8	Flávia Saraiva (BRA)	5.500	7.400		12.900	Q
9	Ariana Orrego (PER)	5.000	7.750		12.750	Q
10	Agustina Pisos (ARG)	4.900	7.825		12.725	Q
11	Victoria-Kayen Woo (CAN)	5.000	7.600		12.600	R1
12	Isabela Onyshko (CAN)	5.000	7.550		12.550	–
13	Bianca Leon (PUR)	4.800	7.650		12.450	R2
14	Karelys Diaz (PUR)	4.800	7.550		12.350	R3

=== Final ===
Women's balance beam final results
Rank	Gymnast	D Score	E Score	Pen.	Total
1st place, gold medalist(s)	Kara Eaker (USA)	6.6	8.666		15.266
2nd place, silver medalist(s)	Ellie Black (CAN)	5.1	8.466		13.566
3rd place, bronze medalist(s)	Riley McCusker (USA)	6.1	7.233		13.333
4	Fabiola Diaz (PER)	5.1	7.333		12.433
5	Flávia Saraiva (BRA)	5.5	6.800		12.300
6	Agustina Pisos (ARG)	4.9	7.300		12.200
7	Danusia Francis (JAM)	4.9	6.833		11.733
8	Ariana Orrego (PER)	4.8	6.566		11.366
