= 2018 Junior Pan American Artistic Gymnastics Championships =

International sports competition

Junior Pan American Artistic Gymnastics Championships
- Location: Buenos Aires, Argentina
- Date: June 13–15, 2018

The 2018 Junior Pan American Artistic Gymnastics Championships was held in Buenos Aires, Argentina, June 13–15, 2018.

== Medal summary ==
=== Junior medalists ===
Event	Gold	Silver	Bronze
Women
Team	United States; Jordan Bowers; Tori Tatum; JaFree Scott; Leanne Wong	Canada; Zoé Allaire-Bourgie; Imogen Paterson; Emma Spence; Mia St-Pierre	Argentina; Olivia Araújo; Brisa Carraro; Luna Fernández; Abigail Magistrati
All Around	Jordan Bowers (USA)	Zoé Allaire-Bourgie (CAN)	Leanne Wong (USA)
Vault	Tori Tatum (USA)	Leanne Wong (USA)	Imogen Paterson (CAN)
Uneven bars	Jordan Bowers (USA)	Leanne Wong (USA)	Zoé Allaire-Bourgie (CAN)
Balance beam	Zoé Allaire-Bourgie (CAN)	Leanne Wong (USA)	Jordan Bowers (USA)
Floor exercise	Jordan Bowers (USA)	Tori Tatum (USA)	Mia St-Pierre (CAN)
Men
Team	United States; Brandon Briones; Taylor Burkhart; John Chou; Isaiah Drake	Brazil; Diogo Soares; Lucas Souza; Murilo Pontedura; Patrick Sampaio	Canada; Dorian Doan; Félix Dolci; Evgeny Siminiuc; Félix Blaquière
All Around	Brandon Briones (USA)	Diogo Soares (BRA)	Félix Dolci (CAN)
Floor exercise	John Chou (USA)	Diogo Soares (BRA)	Félix Dolci (CAN)
Pommel horse	John Chou (USA)	Jorge Pérez (MEX)	Murilo Pontedura (BRA)
Rings	Félix Dolci (CAN)	Brandon Briones (USA)	Félix Blaquière (CAN)
Vault	Diogo Soares (BRA)	Joan Pilay (ECU)	Brandon Briones (USA)
Parallel bars	Félix Blaquière (CAN)	Murilo Pontedura (BRA)	Diogo Soares (BRA)
Horizontal bar	Diogo Soares (BRA)	Brandon Briones (USA)	Félix Dolci (CAN)

== Medal table ==
Rank	Nation	Gold	Silver	Bronze	Total
1	United States (USA)	9	6	3	18
2	Canada (CAN)	3	2	8	13
3	Brazil (BRA)	2	4	2	8
4	Ecuador (ECU)	0	1	0	1
4	Mexico (MEX)	0	1	0	1
6	Argentina (ARG)	0	0	1	1
Totals (6 entries)		14	14	14	42
