= Gymnastics at the 2015 Pan American Games – Women's floor =

Women's floor at the 2015 Pan American Games
- Venue: Toronto Coliseum
- Dates: July 15
- Competitors: 43
- Winning score: 14.400

Medalists
Gold medal	Ellie Black	Canada
Silver medal	Amelia Hundley	United States
Bronze medal	Ana Sofía Gómez	Guatemala

The women's floor gymnastic event at the 2015 Pan American Games was held on July 15 at the Toronto Coliseum.

== Schedule ==
All times are Eastern Standard Time (UTC-3).

Date	Time	Round
July 15, 2015	14:40	Final

== Results ==
=== Qualification ===
Position	Gymnast	Floor (gymnastics)	Notes
1	Madison Desch (USA)	14.650	Q
2	Amelia Hundley (USA)	14.300	Q
3	Flávia Saraiva (BRA)	14.200	Q
4	Ellie Black (CAN)	14.200	Q
5	Daniele Hypólito (BRA)	14.150	Q
6	Ana Sofía Gómez (GUA)	14.000	Q
7	Paula Mejias (PUR)	13.950	Q
8	Leidys Perdomo (CUB)	13.850	Q
9	Ayelén Tarabini (ARG)	13.800	R
10	Isabela Onyshko (CAN)	13.600	R
11	Yurañy Avendano (COL)	13.300	R

=== Final ===
Position	Gymnast	Floor (gymnastics)	Notes
1st place, gold medalist(s)	Ellie Black (CAN)	14.400	
2nd place, silver medalist(s)	Amelia Hundley (USA)	14.200	
3rd place, bronze medalist(s)	Ana Sofía Gómez (GUA)	14.150	
4	Madison Desch (USA)	13.975	
5	Leidys Perdomo (CUB)	13.425	
6	Flávia Saraiva (BRA)	13.200	
7	Paula Mejias (PUR)	13.125	
8	Daniele Hypólito (BRA)	12.800	
