= Gymnastics at the 2013 Summer Universiade – Women's balance beam =

The women's balance beam gymnastics competition at the 2013 Summer Universiade was held on July 10 at the Gymnastics Centre in Kazan.

== Results ==
Rank	Gymnast	D Score	E Score	Pen.	Total
1st place, gold medalist(s)	Zhang Yelinzi (CHN)	6.6	8.550		15.150
2nd place, silver medalist(s)	Aliya Mustafina (RUS)	6.1	8.425		14.525
3rd place, bronze medalist(s)	Elsabeth Black (CAN)	6.0	8.400		14.400
4	Pak Sin Hyang (PRK)	5.7	8.275		13.975
5	Anna Dementyeva (RUS)	6.1	7.625		13.725
6	Pia Tolle (GER)	4.9	8.400		13.300
7	Sakura Noda (JPN)	5.7	7.400		13.100
8	Yu Minobe (JPN)	6.0	6.550		12.550
