= Gymnastics at the 2013 Summer Universiade – Women's floor =

The women's floor gymnastics competition at the 2013 Summer Universiade was held on July 10 at the Gymnastics Centre in Kazan.

== Results ==
Rank	Gymnast	D Score	E Score	Pen.	Total
1st place, gold medalist(s)	Ksenia Afanasyeva (RUS)	6.3	8.450	0.4	14.350
2nd place, silver medalist(s)	Elsa García (MEX)	5.7	8.350	0.3	13.750
2nd place, silver medalist(s)	Elsabeth Black (CAN)	5.5	8.250		13.750
4	Kim Bùi (GER)	5.4	8.300		13.700
5	Yu Minobe (JPN)	5.4	8.150		13.550
6	Danusia Francis (GBR)	5.0	8.450		13.450
7	Angelina Kysla (UKR)	5.1	8.225	0.1	13.225
8	Sakura Noda (JPN)	5.3	7.750		13.050
9	Aliya Mustafina (RUS)	5.5	7.375		12.875
