= Gymnastics at the 2019 Pan American Games – Women's uneven bars =

Women's uneven bars at the 2019 Pan American Games
- Venue: Polideportivo Villa el Salvador
- Dates: July 30
- Competitors: 8 from 4 nations
- Winning score: 14.533

Medalists
Gold medal	Riley McCusker	United States
Silver medal	Leanne Wong	United States
Bronze medal	Ellie Black	Canada

The women's uneven bars gymnastic event at the 2019 Pan American Games was held on July 30 at the Polideportivo Villa el Salvador.

== Schedule ==
All times are Eastern Standard Time (UTC-3).

Date	Time	Round
July 30, 2019	15:30	Final

== Results ==
=== Qualification ===
Women's uneven bars qualification results
Rank	Gymnast	D Score	E Score	Pen.	Total	Qual.
1	Riley McCusker (USA)	6.100	8.800		14.900	Q
2	Leanne Wong (USA)	5.900	8.350		14.250	Q
3	Morgan Hurd (USA)	6.000	8.250		14.250	–
4	Ellie Black (CAN)	5.900	8.150		14.050	Q
5	Lorrane Oliveira (BRA)	5.600	8.400		14.000	Q
6	Kara Eaker (USA)	5.500	8.300		13.800	–
7	Martina Dominici (ARG)	4.900	8.450		13.350	Q
8	Carolyne Pedro (BRA)	5.100	8.050		13.150	Q
9	Brooklyn Moors (CAN)	5.000	8.100		13.100	Q
10	Abigail Magistrati (ARG)	5.000	8.000		13.000	Q
11	Thais Fidelis (BRA)	5.000	7.950		12.950	–
12	Isabela Onyshko (CAN)	5.600	7.350		12.950	–
13	Danusia Francis (JAM)	5.100	7.775		12.875	R1
14	Flávia Saraiva (BRA)	5.200	7.600		12.800	–
15	Marcia Vidiaux (CUB)	4.500	8.200		12.700	R2
16	Daniela Briceño (MEX)	4.700	8.000		12.700	R3

=== Final ===
Women's uneven bars final results
Rank	Gymnast	D Score	E Score	Pen.	Total
1st place, gold medalist(s)	Riley McCusker (USA)	6.0	8.533		14.533
2nd place, silver medalist(s)	Leanne Wong (USA)	5.9	8.400		14.300
3rd place, bronze medalist(s)	Ellie Black (CAN)	5.9	8.100		14.000
4	Lorrane Oliveira (BRA)	5.6	8.233		13.833
5	Martina Dominici (ARG)	5.3	8.133		13.433
6	Brooklyn Moors (CAN)	4.9	8.100		13.000
7	Carolyne Pedro (BRA)	5.1	7.666		12.766
8	Abigail Magistrati (ARG)	4.8	7.400		12.200
