= Sunita Sharma (gymnast) =

Indian gymnast

Personal information
- Citizenship: India

Sport
- Sport: Gymnastics

Sunita Sharma is an Indian gymnast from Ambala, Haryana in Northwest India. She won the Arjuna Award in 1985 for her achievements in gymnastics.

== See also ==
- Gymnastics in India
- Arjuna Award
