= Dhaleshwar =

gandhighat
- Locality
- Location in Tripura, India gandhighat (India)
- Coordinates: 23°49′57″N 91°17′49″E
- Country: India
- State: Tripura
- District: West Tripura

Languages
  - Official: Bengali, Kokborok, English
- Time zone: UTC+5:30 (IST)
- PIN: 799001
- Telephone code: 91-381
- Vehicle registration: TR
- Coastline: 0 kilometres (0 mi)
- Avg. summer temperature: 25 to 40 °C (77 to 104 °F)
- Avg. winter temperature: 5 to 15 °C (41 to 59 °F)
- Website: tripura.gov.in

Dhaleshwar is a locality in Agartala, Tripura close to Banamalipur, Indra Nagar, Kalyani and Math Chowhamani. It comes under East Police Station and Dhaleswar Post Office.

== Educational institutes ==
- Dhaleswar Higher Secondary School
- Prachya Bharati School
- Ramkrishna Shishu Tirtha
- Ramkrishna Vivekananda Vidya Mandir
- Swami Dayalananda Higher Secondary School

== Hospitals and health center ==
Dhaleswar Satellite Dispensary is operated by Agartala Municipal Corporation. It is a primary health center.

== Notable residents ==
- Mantu Debnath - Arjuna awardee, professional gymnast.
