= Dalip Singh (gymnastics coach) =

Indian gymnastics coach

Dalip Singh, also spelt as Duleep Singh, (c. 1932–16 October 1987) was an Indian gymnastics coach from Haryana. His main training centre was Vivekananda Byamagar, Agartala. Gymnastics began in Tripura at that centre under the supervision of Singh, who began working in Agartala in 1964. His notable students included Mantu Debnath, Bharat Kishore Debbarman, Kalpana Debnath, Bishweshwar Nandi, and others.

== Biography ==
Dalip Singh was from a family of farmers in Haryana. He was an Indian Army sports instructor. In the mid-sixties, he was deputed to Agartala to scout for gymnastics talent. He had been trained by Russian gymnast at Patiala's National Institute of Sports (now Netaji Subhash National Institute of Sports) run by Sports Authority of India. During his visit to Agartala, he married a Manipuri doctor, Sushila Devi, in 1969 and stayed on in Tripura, having decided to work towards turning the state into the gymnastics field. He died on 16 October 1987, aged only 55.

== See also ==
- Gymnastics in India
