= Kalpana Debnath =

Indian gymnast

Personal information
- Citizenship: Indian
- Born: Tripura, India

Sport
- Sport: Gymnastics

Kalpana Debnath is an Indian Bengali gymnast from Tripura who received the Arjuna Award in 2000 for her contributions to Indian gymnastics. She is the second Arjuna awardee from Tripura after Mantu Debnath. She was trained by Dalip Singh.

== See also ==
- Gymnastics in India
- List of Arjuna award recipients (2000–2009)
- Arjuna Award
- Tripura
