= Krupali Patel =

Indian gymnast

Personal information
- Citizenship: India
- Spouse: S.P. Singh (gymnastics coach)

Sport
- Sport: Gymnastics

Krupali Patel, also known as Krupali Patel Singh by marriage, is an Indian gymnast. She is also a gymnastics coach. She won the Arjuna Award in 1989 for her outstanding contributions to Indian gymnastics. She is India's youngest woman Arjuna awardee.

== See also ==
- Gymnastics in India
- Palak Kour Bijral
- Arjuna Award
