= Palak Kour Bijral =

Indian rhythmic gymnast (born 1996)

Palak Bijral
- Full name: Palak Kour Bijral
- Born: 15 November 1996 (age 29) Jammu, India

Gymnastics career
- Discipline: Rhythmic gymnastics
- Country represented: India
- Gym: Maulana Azad Stadium
- Head coach: Krupali Patel Singh
- Choreographer: Krupali Patel Singh

Palak Kour Bijral (born 15 November 1996) is an Indian individual rhythmic gymnast. She competed at the 2014 Commonwealth Games.

== Career ==
Bijral began artistic gymnastics at age six and moved to rhythmic gymnastics in 2007 at age 11. Her first international competition was the Children of Asia Games in 2008, held in Yakutsk. She admires Russian gymnast Margarita Mamun.

She competed at the 2013 World Championships held in Kyiv, her only appearance at the World Championships. She placed 96th in the all-around. The next year, she competed at the World Cup stage in Tashkent, where she placed 31st. Later in 2014, she competed at the 2014 Commonwealth Games, where she placed 32nd in the qualification round. Ahead of the games, she practiced outdoors because her gym was under construction.

Although the Commonwealth Games were her last major international competition, Bijral continued to compete nationally. She won two gold and one silver medals at the 2015 National Games of India, for which she was awarded the State Award of Jammu and Kashmir. She competed at the All India University Championships from 2017 to 2019, and in 2019, she won all five gold medals at the competition.

In 2025, she was a member of an anti-obesity campaign encouraging physical activity and healthy eating. Bijral has also been outspoken about the poor state of facilities available to her and other gymnasts in Jammu despite their success in Indian gymnastics, complaining that when she went to Srinagar, she saw a gym that was large and well-maintained, while in her own gym, light bulbs often burst.

== Awards ==
- All Round Best Award 2018
