= Gymnastics Federation of India =

Sports governing body in India

- Sport: Gymnastics
- Jurisdiction: India
- Founded: February 17, 1951
- Affiliation: International Gymnastics Federation
- Regional affiliation: Asian Gymnastics Union
- Headquarters: South Delhi
- President: Sudhir Mital

Official website
- gymfedindia.com
- (India)

The Gymnastics Federation of India (GFI) is the governing and controlling body of gymnastics in India. It was established on 17 February 1951. It is registered under the Societies Registration Act, 1860, and is affiliated to the International Gymnastics Federation. GFI organised the first national gymnastics championship in 1952 in Madras. Each year, they hold national championships in the following categories: Senior Artistic, Junior Artistic, Sub Junior Artistic, Rhythmic & Aerobic, and Acrobatics & Tumbling. Sudhir Mital serves as the current president of GFI.
