= Bishweshwar Nandi =

Indian gymnastics coach

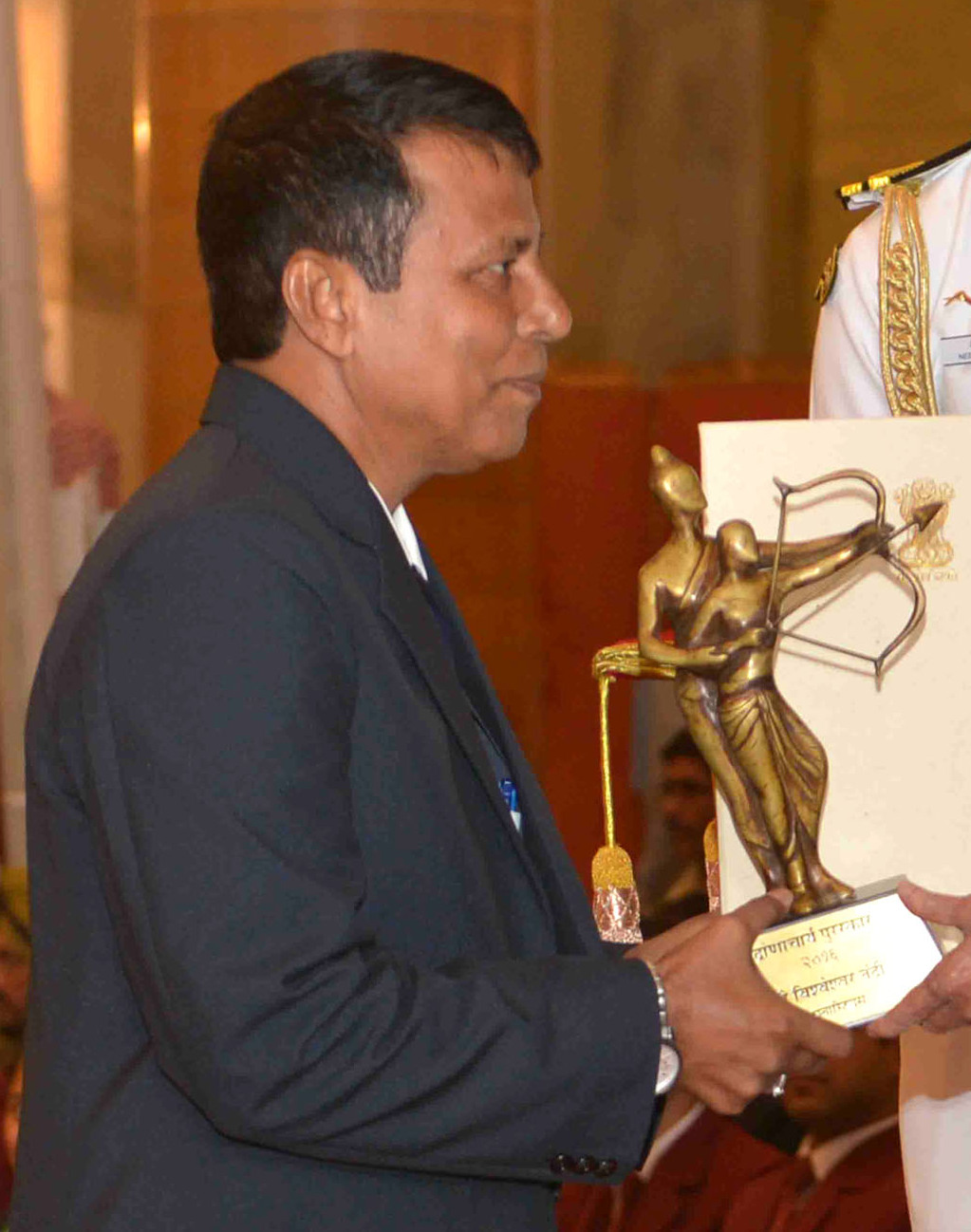
- Nandi receiving the 2016 Dronacharya Award for gymnastics

Personal information
- Born: 14 December 1961 (age 64) Tripura, Indian Union Territory

Gymnastics career
- Discipline: Men's artistic gymnastics
- Country represented: India
- Awards: Dronacharya Award (2016)

Bishweshwar Nandi is an Indian gymnastics coach. He was also a prolific gymnast himself. He was trained by Dalip Singh. Nandi had been five times National Champion in gymnastics, represented the country in 12 instances and led the Indian gymnastics team six times as captain. He won Dronacharya Award in 2016 for his outstanding contribution to Indian gymnastics as a coach. Dipa Karmakar is one of the most successful students of Nandi. His wife, Soma Nandi, is also a gymnastics coach.

Nandi was born in a Bengali family in Tripura, India.

== See also ==
- Gymnastics in India
- Dronacharya Award
- Tripura
