= Leanne Wong =

American artistic gymnast (born 2003)

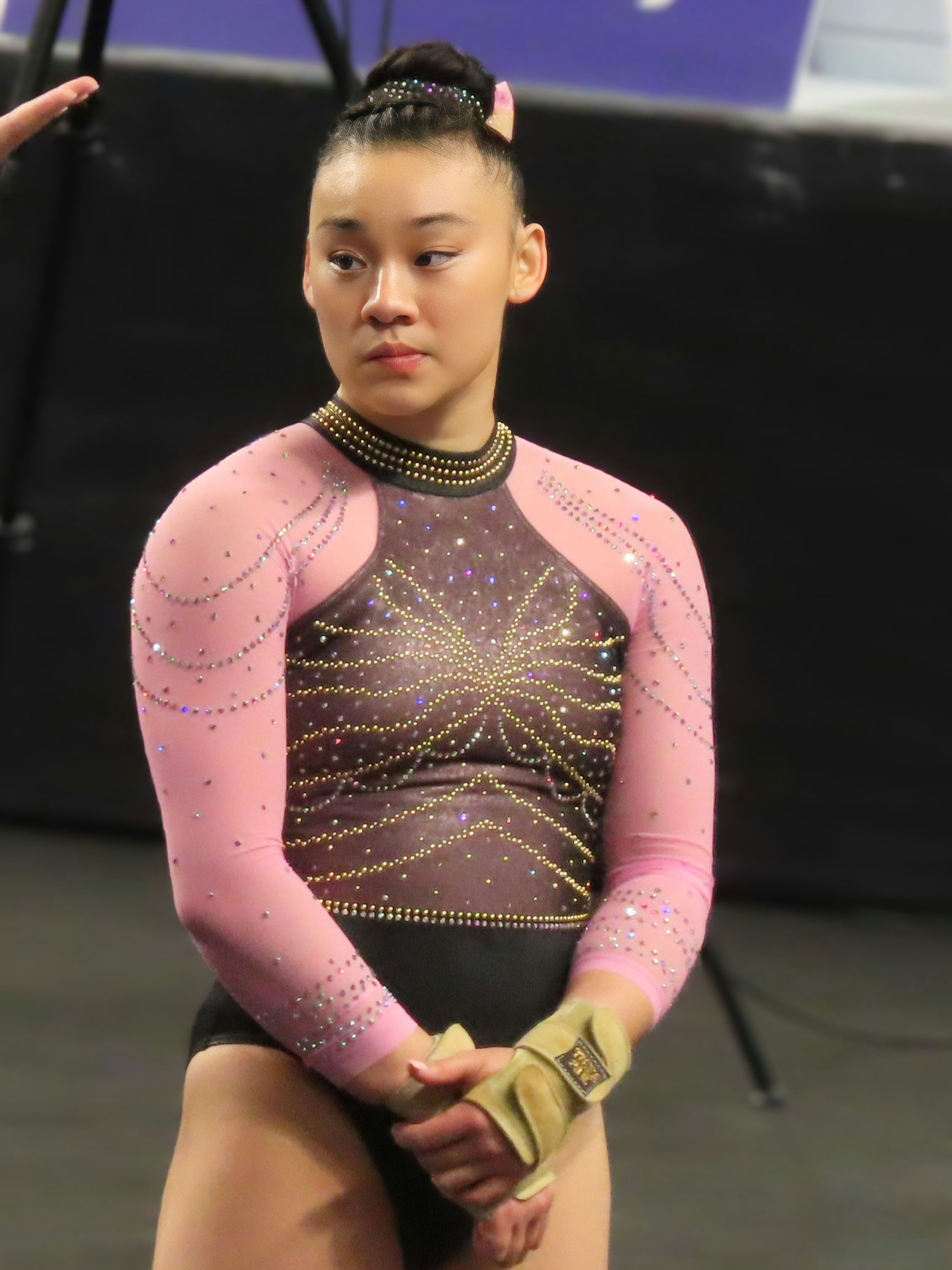
- Wong at the 2024 U.S. Championships

Personal information
- Full name: Leanne Ashley Wong
- Born: September 20, 2003 (age 23)
- Height: 5 ft 1 in (155 cm)

Gymnastics career
- Discipline: Women's artistic gymnastics
- Country represented: United States; (2017–2026)
- College team: Florida Gators (2022–25)
- Club: Cincinnati Gymnastics; GAGE (former)
- Gym: University of Florida
- Head coach: Jenny Rowland
- Former coaches: Al Fong; Armine Barutyan
Medal record
Women's artistic gymnastics
Representing the United States
World Championships
Gold medal – first place	2022 Liverpool	Team
Gold medal – first place	2023 Antwerp	Team
Silver medal – second place	2021 Kitakyushu	All-Around
Silver medal – second place	2025 Jakarta	All-Around
Bronze medal – third place	2021 Kitakyushu	Floor Exercise
Pan American Games
Gold medal – first place	2019 Lima	Team
Silver medal – second place	2019 Lima	Uneven Bars
FIG World Cup
Event / 1st / 2nd / 3rd; All-Around World Cup / 1 / 0 / 0
Representing Florida Gators
NCAA Championships
Gold medal – first place	2024 Fort Worth	Uneven Bars
Silver medal – second place	2022 Fort Worth	Team
Silver medal – second place	2023 Fort Worth	Team
Silver medal – second place	2023 Fort Worth	Floor Exercise
Silver medal – second place	2024 Fort Worth	All-Around
Silver medal – second place	2024 Fort Worth	Vault
Bronze medal – third place	2025 Fort Worth	Uneven Bars

Leanne Ashley Wong (born September 20, 2003) is an American artistic gymnast. She was a member of the gold medal-winning teams at the 2022 World Championships, 2023 World Championships, and the 2019 Pan American Games. She is the 2021 and 2025 World all-around silver medalist, 2021 floor exercise bronze medalist, and was an alternate for the 2020 Olympic and 2024 Olympic teams.

== Junior gymnastics career ==
=== 2017 ===
Wong qualified as an elite gymnast at the Parkettes National Qualifier in May alongside club teammate Kara Eaker, where she scored a 51.900 in the all-around to qualify to nationals. She later competed at the American Classic in Texas, winning gold medals in the all-around and on vault. At the end of July, Wong competed at the Secret U.S. Classic, where she placed ninth in the all-around and sixth on vault.

Wong competed at her first national championships in August. Wong continued to impress on vault with a two-night score of 29.45, winning the national title on the apparatus ahead of Maile O'Keefe and Emma Malabuyo. Wong also placed third on floor exercise as well as fifth in the all-around behind O'Keefe, Malabuyo, Eaker, and Adeline Kenlin with a combined total of 108.250 points. After the championships, she was named to the junior national team.

=== 2018 ===
With O'Keefe, Malabuyo, Eaker, and Kenlin all moving to the senior level, Wong entered the season as one of the top American junior competitors. On April 8, Wong was named to the Junior Pan American Championships team. In advance of this competition, she competed at the Auburn National Qualifier, where she won the all-around with upgraded routines on the uneven bars, balance beam, and floor exercise.

Wong traveled to Buenos Aires, Argentina in June to make her international debut at the Junior Pan American Championships. Competing on a team alongside Jordan Bowers, Tori Tatum, and JaFree Scott, Wong won a gold medal in the team competition. Individually, she won the bronze medal in the all-around behind Bowers and Zoe Allaire-Bourgie of Canada. Two days later, Wong competed in the event finals on vault, uneven bars, and balance beam, placing second on each apparatus behind Tatum, Bowers, and Allaire-Bourgie, respectively.

Wong competed at the GK U.S. Classic at the end of July. She won the all-around by over a point ahead of American Classic champion Kayla DiCello and Junior Pan American champion Bowers with a score of 55.350. She also placed first on vault and floor exercise and third on balance beam. Three weeks later, Wong competed at the 2018 National Championships. With her victory at the Classic, she entered the meet as one of the contenders for the title along with fellow national team members Bowers, DiCello, Tatum, and Sunisa Lee. After two days of competition in which Wong hit all eight of her competitive routines, she became the 2018 Junior all-around champion ahead of DiCello and Lee. Her two-day combined total of 112.250 would have placed her 4th in the senior division. Additionally, she won the national title on floor exercise, was the runner-up on vault behind DiCello and on uneven bars behind Lee, and placed sixth on balance beam. Her performance secured her spot on the junior national team for the second consecutive year.

== Senior gymnastics career ==
=== 2019 ===
It was announced that Wong would make her senior debut and represent the USA at the 2019 American Cup alongside second year senior Grace McCallum in March. On March 2, Wong won the American Cup title with a score of 56.765, beating McCallum in second and the two previous World all-around silver medalists, Canada's Ellie Black (2017) and Japan's Mai Murakami (2018), who tied for third place. She debuted numerous upgrades, most notably a piked double Arabian (Dos Santos I) to immediate stag jump as her first tumbling pass on floor exercise. She posted the highest scores of the competition on vault and balance beam.

In June, after the conclusion of the American Classic, Wong was named as one of the eight athletes being considered for the team to compete at the 2019 Pan American Games along with Sloane Blakely, Kara Eaker, Aleah Finnegan, Morgan Hurd, Shilese Jones, Sunisa Lee, and Riley McCusker.

At the 2019 GK US Classic Leanne Wong finished fifth in the all-around behind Simone Biles, Riley McCusker, Grace McCallum, and Kara Eaker. She also finished tied for eighth on bars with Jordan Chiles, fourth on beam behind Eaker, McCusker, and Biles, and tied for fifth on floor with McCusker. After the competition she was named to the team to compete at the Pan American Games alongside Finnegan, Hurd, McCusker, and Eaker.

At the Pan American Games Wong only competed on uneven bars and balance beam. She contributed scores on both events to the team's gold medal winning performance. She qualified to the uneven bars final in second behind McCusker and would've qualified to the balance beam final in third if not for teammates Eaker and McCusker posting higher scores than her as a maximum of two gymnasts per country may participate in each individual final. During the uneven bars final Wong won the silver medal, once again finishing behind McCusker.

At the 2019 U.S. National Championships, Wong competed all four events on the first day of competition but ended the night in fifth place after she received a low score on floor exercise. Her attempted second skill, a laid-out 3.5 twist, was downgraded to a laid-out triple twisting due to under-rotation, thus invalidating the intended triple twist she then performed for her final skill. On the second day of competition, she performed cleanly and placed fifth in the all-around behind Simone Biles, Sunisa Lee, Grace McCallum, and Morgan Hurd. Additionally she won bronze on the balance beam behind Biles and club mate Kara Eaker. As a result she was added to the national team.

In September Wong competed at the World team selection camp and placed eighth with a score of 54.750 after falling on her vault. She posted the second best score on bars behind Sunisa Lee. Following the two-day camp she was named as a non-traveling alternate for the team along with Morgan Hurd.

=== 2020 ===
In March Wong was selected to compete at the City of Jesolo Trophy alongside Kara Eaker, Shilese Jones, and Sophia Butler. However, the USA decided to not send a team due to the coronavirus outbreak in Italy. In November Wong signed her National Letter of Intent with the Florida Gators, starting in the 2021–22 school year.

=== 2021 ===
In April, Wong competed at the American Classic and placed second in the all-around behind Skye Blakely. She won the vault title, scoring 14.400 on her double-twisting yurchenko. She placed eleventh on beam after grabbing the beam on a turn and tied for sixth on the floor after going out of bounds and falling. In May, Wong competed at the U.S. Classic where she finished sixth in the all-around, fifth on floor exercise, and second on balance beam behind Simone Biles. At the National Championships Wong finished fifth in the all-around. Additionally she won bronze on floor exercise behind Biles and Kayla DiCello. As a result she was named to the national team and selected to compete at the Olympic Trials. At the Olympic Trials, Wong finished eighth in the all-around and second on floor exercise. She was named as an alternate for the Olympic team.

In October Wong was selected to compete at the 2021 World Championships alongside Kayla DiCello, Konnor McClain, and eMjae Frazier. While there she qualified for the all-around final in second place behind Angelina Melnikova, the floor exercise final in third place behind Mai Murakami and Melnikova, and the balance beam final in fourth place. In the all around final, she clinched silver behind Angelina Melnikova and in front of teammate Kayla Dicello. In event finals, she placed fourth on balance beam after grabbing the beam on her acrobatic series, and won the bronze medal on floor exercise.

=== 2022 ===
In July 2022, Wong returned to elite competition at the 2022 U.S. Classic. She competed in the all-around and scored a 54.400, winning the title. She also placed first balance beam and third on the floor exercise. On the uneven bars, she fell on her Bhardwaj and placed eighth. In August Wong competed at the National Championships. She only competed on the uneven bars and balance beam. She co-won the national title on the uneven bars alongside Shilese Jones and finished fifth on balance beam.

In October Wong was selected to compete at the 2022 World Championships alongside Skye Blakely, Jade Carey, Jordan Chiles, and Shilese Jones. During the qualification round Wong only competed on vault and helped the USA qualify first as a team. During the team final Wong competed on the uneven bars, helping the USA win their sixth consecutive team gold medal.

=== 2023 ===
Before the 2023 domestic elite season, Wong had already qualified to the 2023 U.S. National Gymnastics Championships by virtue of being a 2022 U.S. World team member. At the 2023 U.S. Classic in August, she finished second in the all-around with a score of 54.100, behind returning Simone Biles and ahead of Joscelyn Roberson. She then placed third at the national championships, behind Biles and 2022 World Championship teammate Shilese Jones. Her placement gave her an automatic invitation to the World and Pan American Game selection camp, where she finished fifth in the all-around on the first day and fourth on the second day, where only two events were contested. As a result, she was selected to represent the United States at the 2023 World Championships alongside Biles, Skye Blakely, Jones, Joscelyn Roberson, and alternate Kayla DiCello. Wong was the only American female gymnast to make all three World teams in the 2021-2024 quadrennium.

At the World Championships, Wong competed on all four events in qualification and helped the USA qualify in first place to the team final. She placed 11th in the all-around, behind teammates Simone Biles and Shilese Jones, and 10th on vault, behind teammates Biles and Joscelyn Roberson. She was excluded from the all-around final and the second reserve position for the vault final by the two-per-country rule.

In the team final, Wong was named to the balance beam lineup after Skye Blakely fell during qualification. Then, after Roberson was injured during warmups and withdrew from the team final, Wong took her place on vault and floor exercise, helping the United States win its record seventh consecutive World women's team title. After Roberson and Jessica Gadirova withdrew from the vault final, Wong competed (along with first and second reserves Ellie Black and Csenge Bácskay), placing seventh.

=== 2024 ===
Wong began the elite season competing at the Core Hydration Classic where she placed seventh in the all-around and won bronze on vault. At the National Championships Wong placed eighth in the all-around and fourth on floor exercise. As a result she qualified to the Olympic Trials.

At the Olympic trials, she placed seventh in the all-around, third on vault, fifth on uneven bars, seventh on balance beam, and ninth on floor, and was named an alternate for Team USA at the 2024 Summer Olympics. Wong ended the year competing at the Swiss Cup where she was partnered with men's national team member Fuzzy Benas. They were eliminated after the first round and finished ninth overall.

=== 2025 ===
Wong returned to elite competition at the U.S. Classic in August 2025 placing eleventh on the uneven bars and tied for fifth on the balance beam. At the National Championships, Wong scored a two-day total (111.200) with a first in vault, second in the all-around, third-place finish on bars, and a fifth-place finish on balance beam and floor. This is Wong's second national title, previously co-winning for bars in 2022. Wong was named to her seventh consecutive United States women's national gymnastics team and a chance to compete for a slot on the Worlds team.

On the first day of the World Championships selection camp Wong placed second in the all-around behind Dulcy Caylor, scoring an event high of 14.950 on vault. On the second day she earned a two-vault average of 14.400 and secured her place on the team alongside Joscelyn Roberson, Caylor, and her former Florida Gators teammate Skye Blakely.

At the 2025 World Championships in Jakarta, Wong balked and fell on her first vault in the qualification round, scoring just an 11.733 with a difficulty score of 4.4 for a tucked Yurchenko double full instead of the laid-out vault she had planned. She performed hit routines on the other three events and advanced to the all-around final in ninth place, but did not advance to any event finals. She won the silver medal in the all-around final, one-tenth of a point behind neutral athlete Angelina Melnikova.

=== 2026 ===
Wong began her 2026 elite season at the U.S. Classic in July. Due to a wrist injury, she competed only on balance beam, placing fifteenth after a fall. She was going to compete at the 2026 National Championships but withdrew after hurting her knee during podium training.

== Collegiate gymnastics career ==
=== 2021–2022 season ===
Wong made her NCAA debut on January 7 in a quad meet against Rutgers, Northern Illinois, and Texas Women's. She competed on uneven bars, balance beam, and floor exercise to help Florida win the meet. Her uneven bars score of 9.875 was the highest of the night alongside teammate Savannah Schoenherr. Wong made her collegiate all-around appearance against Alabama on January 16, scoring a 39.300 to take second. On January 28, in a meet against Arkansas, Wong earned her first career perfect ten on the uneven bars. Additionally she earned her first collegiate all-around title. Wong earned her second collegiate all-around title in the meet against LSU on February 11. On March 11, in a quad meet at North Carolina State University, Wong upped her career best all-around score to a 39.850, which at that time was the highest all-around score in the nation achieved that season. In her first SEC Championships, Wong won the balance beam title with a career-best 9.975 and tied for second in the all-around, helping the Gators to win their first SEC Championship title since 2016. For her performance, Wong earned All-SEC and All-Freshman team honors. In the regional final on April 2, Wong upped her career-best all-around score to a 39.875 and earned her first perfect ten on vault. In the national semifinals, Wong contributed scores of 9.9000 on vault, 9.9125 on uneven bars, 9.8625 on balance beam, and 9.9500 on floor exercise to place fifth in the all-around and help the Gators qualify into the national final. For her performance, she earned first team All-America honors on vault, floor exercise, and in the all-around, as well as second team All-America honors on uneven bars. In the national final, Wong contributed scores of 9.9125 on vault, 9.8750 on uneven bars, 9.8375 on balance beam, and 9.9500 on floor exercise to contribute to the Gators' second-place finish.

=== 2022–2023 season ===
Wong made her season debut on January 6 in a quad meet against Ball State, Lindenwood, and West Virginia, where she competed on vault, uneven bars, and balance beam, and shared the bars title with a 9.950, tying teammate Trinity Thomas. Wong made her season debut in the all-around on January 13 against Auburn, where she scored her second career 10.0 on the uneven bars, her first career 10.0 on the balance beam, and a 39.825 in the all-around, the nation's high score. This marked the second year in a row where Wong had the nation's first uneven bars 10.0. In a dual meet against Georgia on January 27, Wong again won the bars, beam, and all-around titles, scoring a 9.975, 9.925, and 39.650, respectively. In a dual meet against Arkansas on February 3, Wong scored her third career 10.0 on the uneven bars, her second career 10.0 on the balance beam, and a 39.775 in the all-around to take first. In a dual meet against Missouri on February 10, Wong re-set her career high on floor with a 9.975, sharing the event title with teammates Sloane Blakely and Thomas. In a dual meet against Kentucky, Wong scored a 9.975 on the uneven bars and shared the event title with teammates Kayla DiCello and Thomas as part of a Florida record 49.800 total on bars. In a dual meet against Oklahoma on March 3, Wong shared the floor exercise title with Faith Torrez of the Sooners with a 9.950 and won the all-around with a 39.675. In a quad meet held at Texas Women's University on March 12, Wong won the bars title and all-around title with a 9.950 and 39.650, respectively. At the SEC Championship on March 18, Wong helped contribute to Florida's second consecutive SEC title and successfully defended her balance beam title with a 9.975. For her performance, she was named to the All-SEC team. At the Pittsburgh regional semifinal on March 31, Wong won the floor exercise with a career-high tying 9.975. At the Pittsburgh regional final on April 2, Wong won the uneven bars and balance beam titles with a pair of 9.975s, and won the all-around with a 39.775 en route to helping Florida qualify to the NCAA Championship.

=== 2023–2024 season ===
On February 23, in a meet against LSU, Wong earned a perfect 10 on floor exercise, making her the 15th woman to earn a gym slam—the feat of scoring a perfect 10 on all four apparatuses over a career.

Wong was named SEC Gymnast of the Week on February 27 for setting the nation's high all-around total of 39.875 versus No. 2 LSU. It was her fourth SEC Gymnast of the Week honor for her career at Florida.

She also won her first NCAA title on the Uneven Bars with a score of 9.9625.

At season's end, Wong was named Women's Collegiate Gymnastics Association Scholastic All-America for keeping a GPA of 3.5 or higher. She was also named to the 2023-24 College Sports Communicators (CSC) Academic All-America At-Large team, the 10th Gator so honored.

Wong was also named among four finalists for the Honda Sports Award - Gymnastics, the award for the top collegiate female athlete in 12 sports.

=== 2024–2025 season ===
Wong's senior-year season debut came in a January 10 quad meet against Michigan State, Nebraska, and Northern Illinois. She won her 15th all-around title with the nation's highest score of that week: 39.725. On January 14, she was named SEC Gymnast of the Week.

On February 14, in a meet against No. 12-ranked Auburn, Wong earned a perfect 10 on balance beam, her first of the season and her third on the apparatus. Her teammate Sloane Blakely earned a perfect 10 on floor exercise, and the Gators won the meet. Wong tied Selena Harris-Miranda for first place all-around with a score of 39.75, her fourth all-around title of the season. On February 18, Wong and Blakely were named co-SEC Gymnast of the Week.

On March 4, after posting the nation's top all-around total for the weekend (39.75) against No. 8 Missouri, Wong claimed her third SEC Gymnast of the Week award of the season, her seventh in total.

During the final meet of the regular season, Wong earned her 10th career perfect 10 while closing the night on floor exercise. She holds the second-highest number of career 10s at Florida, behind her former teammate Trinity Thomas. She is the runner-up in the all-around with a score of 39.725, among the nation's leading all-around totals. She helped Florida score a national-best team total of 198.625.

At the SEC Championship, Wong hit her first perfect 10 on uneven bars for the season, her fifth of her career. She shared the uneven bars title with her teammate Riley McCusker and Mizzou's Mara Titarsolej. The two perfect 10s helped Florida post a 49.85 on uneven bars, setting the NCAA record and earning Wong her third SEC uneven bars title.

Wong earned first team Women's Collegiate Gymnastics Association (WCGA) regular season All-American honors in the all-around and uneven bars, second team honors in vault, balance beam, and floor exercise. She is one of only four gymnasts to receive All-American honors in all disciplines.

At the second round of NCAA regionals in Tuscaloosa, Wong turned in a team-high of 9.950 on uneven bars, matching the Gators second-highest bars total for the season (49.575). Wong helped Florida claim its 22nd NCAA regional team title and move on to the NCAA Championship sharing the vault title with teammate Anya Pilgrim and sharing the floor title with Mya Lauzon of California.

Wong ended her career at Florida in the semi-finals of the 2025 NCAA Championship, placing eighteenth (39.2375) in the all-around, well below her typical score. Wong tied for third on uneven bars. Florida didn't advance to the finals for the first time since 2011.

Wong was named as a Top 30 finalist for the NCAA Woman of the Year Award for 2025, honoring senior female student-athletes who have distinguished themselves in their community, in athletics, service, and leadership.

=== Career perfect 10.0s ===
Season	Date	Event	Meet
2022	January 28, 2022	Uneven bars	Florida vs Arkansas
2022	April 2, 2022	Vault	NCAA Regional Final
2023	January 13, 2023	Uneven bars	Florida vs Auburn
2023	January 13, 2023	Balance beam	Florida vs Auburn
2023	February 3, 2023	Uneven bars	Florida @ Arkansas
2023	February 3, 2023	Balance beam	Florida @ Arkansas
2024	February 9, 2024	Uneven bars	Florida vs Arkansas
2024	February 23, 2024	Floor exercise	Florida vs LSU
2025	February 14, 2025	Balance beam	Florida vs Auburn
2025	March 14, 2025	Floor exercise	Florida v Kentucky
2025	March 22, 2025	Uneven bars	SEC Championship

=== NCAA regular-season ranking ===
Season	All-Around	Vault	Uneven Bars	Balance Beam	Floor Exercise
2022	9th	60th	6th	14th	16th
2023	7th	40th	3rd	15th	23rd
2024	9th	18th	3rd	12th	33rd
2025	2nd	10th	2nd	9th	14th

== Skills performed ==
Apparatus	Name	Description	Difficulty (Note: Valid for the 2017-2020 Code of Points)	Performed
Vault	Baitova	Yurchenko entry, laid out salto backwards with two twists	5.0	2019–25
Vault	Cheng	Yurchenko ½-on entry, layout salto forwards with 1½ twists off (aka "½ on–1½ off")	5.6	2024-25
Uneven Bars	Chow 1/2	Stalder Shaposhnikova transition with ½ twist to high bar	E	2019–21
Uneven Bars	Komova II	Inbar Stalder Shaposhnikova transition to high bar	E	2019
Balance Beam	Switch Ring	Switch Leap to Ring Position (180° split with raised back leg)	E	2019–23
Balance Beam	Triple Twist	Dismount: double twisting half twist (2 1/2 /1) laid out salto backward	F	2019-21
Floor Exercise	Andreasen	Tucked Arabian double salto forward	E	2019
Floor Exercise	Triple Twist	Triple-twisting (3/1) laid out salto backward	E	2019–21
Floor Exercise	Dos Santos I	Piked Arabian double salto forward	F	2019, 2022
Floor Exercise	3½ Twist	3½-twisting (7/2) laid out salto backward	F	2019
Floor Exercise	Silivas	Double-twisting (2/1) double tucked salto backwards	H	2021-25

== Leanne Wong Bowtique ==
While attending Blue Valley High School, Wong enrolled in a fashion and interior design elective class that required her to design an outfit and then physically create one element of the outfit. Wong created a bow, then made more to match her practice and competition leotards. After her bows were praised during competitions, Wong began selling them at gymnastics meets and camps and online under the name Leanne Wong Bowtique.

== Competitive history ==
Competitive history of Leanne Wong at the junior level
Year	Event	Team	AA	VT	UB	BB	FX
2017	Parkettes National Qualifier		6	9	11	4	4
2017	American Classic		1st place, gold medalist(s)	1st place, gold medalist(s)	5	9	4
2017	U.S. Classic		9	6	15	18	12
2017	P&G National Championships		5	1st place, gold medalist(s)	26	5	3rd place, bronze medalist(s)
2018	Auburn National Qualifier		1st place, gold medalist(s)	1st place, gold medalist(s)	2nd place, silver medalist(s)		1st place, gold medalist(s)
2018	Pan American Championships	1st place, gold medalist(s)	3rd place, bronze medalist(s)	2nd place, silver medalist(s)	2nd place, silver medalist(s)	2nd place, silver medalist(s)	
2018	U.S. Classic		1st place, gold medalist(s)	1st place, gold medalist(s)	7	3rd place, bronze medalist(s)	1st place, gold medalist(s)
2018	U.S. National Championships		1st place, gold medalist(s)	2nd place, silver medalist(s)	2nd place, silver medalist(s)	6	1st place, gold medalist(s)

Competitive history of Leanne Wong at the senior level
Year	Event	Team	AA	VT	UB	BB	FX
2019	American Cup		1st place, gold medalist(s)				
2019	U.S. Classic		5		8	4	5
2019	Pan American Games	1st place, gold medalist(s)			2nd place, silver medalist(s)		
2019	U.S. National Championships		5		5	3rd place, bronze medalist(s)	14
2019	Worlds Team Selection Camp		8	11	2nd place, silver medalist(s)	6	8
2021	American Classic		2nd place, silver medalist(s)	1st place, gold medalist(s)	3rd place, bronze medalist(s)	11	6
2021	U.S. Classic		6		30	2nd place, silver medalist(s)	5
2021	U.S. National Championships		5		15	10	3rd place, bronze medalist(s)
2021	Olympic Trials		8		6	14	2nd place, silver medalist(s)
2021	World Team Trials		3rd place, bronze medalist(s)				
2021	World Championships		2nd place, silver medalist(s)			4	3rd place, bronze medalist(s)
2022	U.S. Classic		1st place, gold medalist(s)		8	1st place, gold medalist(s)	3rd place, bronze medalist(s)
2022	U.S. National Championships				1st place, gold medalist(s)	5	
2022	World Championships	1st place, gold medalist(s)					
2023	U.S. Classic		2nd place, silver medalist(s)	2nd place, silver medalist(s)	6	16	4
2023	U.S. National Championships		3rd place, bronze medalist(s)	4	4	5	4
2023	World Championships	1st place, gold medalist(s)		7			
2024	U.S. Classic		7	3rd place, bronze medalist(s)	6	27	8
2024	U.S. National Championships		8	5	7	20	4
2024	Olympic Trials		7	3rd place, bronze medalist(s)	5	7	9
2024	Swiss Cup	9					
2025	U.S. Classic				11	5	
2025	U.S. National Championships		2nd place, silver medalist(s)	1st place, gold medalist(s)	3rd place, bronze medalist(s)	5	5
2025	World Championships	—N/a	2nd place, silver medalist(s)		R2		
2026	U.S. Classic					15	

Competitive history of Leanne Wong at the NCAA level
Year	Event	Team	AA	VT	UB	BB	FX
2022	SEC Championships	1st place, gold medalist(s)	2nd place, silver medalist(s)	14	11	1st place, gold medalist(s)	5
2022	NCAA Championships	2nd place, silver medalist(s)	5	8	9	34	4
2023	SEC Championships	1st place, gold medalist(s)	4	7	2nd place, silver medalist(s)	1st place, gold medalist(s)	35
2023	NCAA Championships	2nd place, silver medalist(s)	8	19	7	45	2nd place, silver medalist(s)
2024	SEC Championships	4					
2024	NCAA Championships	4	2nd place, silver medalist(s)	2nd place, silver medalist(s)	1st place, gold medalist(s)	24	15
2025	SEC Championships	3rd place, bronze medalist(s)	9	11	1st place, gold medalist(s)	44	27
2025	NCAA Championships	7	18	25	3rd place, bronze medalist(s)	43	55

== Personal life ==
Wong has two younger brothers named Michael and Brendan. Her parents, Marco Wong and Bee Ding, are both research scientists. She enjoys sightseeing, cooking and playing piano in her free time. Before Wong started gymnastics, she took ice skating classes.

Wong graduated with honors from the University of Florida in May 2025 with a bachelor's degree in Health Education & Behavior, magna cum laude. She joined Florida's coaching staff as a Student Assistant Coach for the 2026 season. In May 2026, she earned her Master's degree in Health Education and Behavior from the University of Florida. During the graduation ceremony, she also served as the commencement speaker for the College of Health and Human Performance.
