= Mantu Debnath =

Indian gymnast

- Alternative name: Montu Debnath

Gymnastics career
- Discipline: Men's artistic gymnastics
- Country represented: India

Mantu Debnath (also spelt as Montu Debnath) is an Indian gymnast from Tripura. He won gold medals at national level competition, became the first Indian gymnast to win an international competition in Russia in 1969 and won the Arjuna Award in 1975 for his contributions in gymnastics. Mantu is also the second Indian Arjuna awardee for gymnastics after Sham Lal and the first Arjuna awardee from Tripura. He was trained by Dalip Singh.

== See also ==
- Gymnastics in India
- Arjuna Award
- Tripura
- Dhaleshwar
