= Gymnastics at the 2014 Commonwealth Games – Women's vault =

Event at the 2014 Commonwealth Games

Women's vault at the 2014 Commonwealth Games
- Venue: SSE Hydro
- Dates: 31 July 2014
- Competitors: 8 from 6 nations
- Winning score: 14.633

Medalists
gold medal	Claudia Fragapane	England
silver medal	Ellie Black	Canada
bronze medal	Dipa Karmakar	India

The women's individual vault competition of the 2014 Commonwealth Games took place on July 31 at the SSE Hydro arena in Glasgow, Scotland.

Dipa Karmakar became the first female Indian gymnast to win a medal at the Commonwealth Games.

== Results ==
=== Qualification ===
Qualification took place on July 28 as part of the team and individual qualification event.

=== Final ===
Position	Gymnast	D Score	E Score	Penalty	Score 1	D Score	E Score	Penalty	Score 2	Total
1st place, gold medalist(s)	Claudia Fragapane (ENG)	5.800	8.966		14.766	5.600	8.900		14.500	14.633
2nd place, silver medalist(s)	Ellie Black (CAN)	5.400	9.033		14.433	5.500	8.933		14.433	14.433
3rd place, bronze medalist(s)	Dipa Karmakar (IND)	5.200	8.533	0.1	13.633	7.000	8.100		15.100	14.366
4	Maegan Chant (CAN)	5.400	8.833		14.233	5.200	9.033		14.233	14.233
5	Kelly Simm (ENG)	5.800	8.833		14.633	5.000	8.766		13.766	14.199
6	Kirsten Beckett (RSA)	5.300	9.066		14.366	5.200	8.766	0.1	13.866	14.116
7	Georgia-Rose Brown (AUS)	5.000	9.100		14.100	4.600	8.966		13.566	13.833
8	Emma White (SCO)	5.000	8.800		13.800	4.800	8.600	0.1	13.300	13.550
Position	Gymnast	Vault 1				Vault 2				Total
