= Dipa Karmakar =

Indian gymnast and Olympic medalist

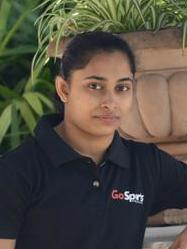

Personal information
- Full name: Dipa Karmakar
- Born: 9 August 1993 (age 33) Agartala, Tripura, India
- Height: 151 cm (4 ft 11 in)

Gymnastics career
- Discipline: Women's artistic gymnastics
- Country represented: India
- Head coach: (India) Bishweshwar Nandi
Medal record
Representing India
Women's artistic gymnastics
World Cup
Gold medal – first place	2018 Mersin	Vault
Bronze medal – third place	2018 Cottbus	Vault
Commonwealth Games
Bronze medal – third place	2014 Glasgow	Vault
Asian Championships
Gold medal – first place	2024 Tashkent	Vault
Bronze medal – third place	2015 Hiroshima	Vault

Dipa Karmakar (Bengali: দীপা কর্মকার; born 9 August 1993) is an Indian former artistic gymnast. She is one of only five women in the world to have mastered the Produnova vault. Karmakar became the first Indian gymnast to qualify for an Olympic final at the 2016 Rio Olympics, where she narrowly missed out on a medal, finishing fourth in the women's vault event by just 0.15 points. In 2024, she announced her retirement from gymnastics.

Karmakar first gained attention when she won a bronze at the 2014 Commonwealth Games in Glasgow, becoming the first Indian female gymnast to do so in the history of the Games. She also won a bronze at the Asian Championships and finished fifth at the 2015 World Championships, both firsts for any Indian athlete.

Karmakar represented India at the 2016 Summer Olympics in Rio de Janeiro, becoming the first Indian female gymnast ever to compete in the Olympics. She was also the first Indian gymnast in any discipline to compete at the Olympics since the 1964 Summer Olympics 52 years ago. Karmakar finished fourth in the vault in Rio, with an overall score of 15.066.

In July 2018, she became the first Indian gymnast to win a gold medal at a global event, when she finished first in the vault event of the FIG Artistic Gymnastics World Challenge Cup at Mersin, Turkey.

She is one of the only five women who have successfully landed the Produnova, which is regarded as one of the most difficult vaults of those currently being performed in women's gymnastics.

She is a recipient of the Padma Shri, the fourth highest civilian award in the Republic of India. For her performance in Rio Olympics 2016, the Government of India conferred upon her the Major Dhyan Chand Khel Ratna award in August 2016.

== Early life and career ==
Hailing from Agartala in Tripura, Karmakar started her school life and education in Abhoynagar Nazrul Smriti Vidyalaya; she started practising gymnastics when she was only 6 years old and has been coached by Soma Nandi & Bishweshwar Nandi since.

When she began gymnastics, Karmakar had flat feet, an undesirable physical trait in a gymnast because it affects their performance. Through extensive training, she was able to develop an arch in her foot.

In 2008, she won the Junior Nationals in Jalpaiguri. Since 2007, Karmakar has won 77 medals, including 67 gold, in state, national and international championships. She was part of the Indian gymnastics contingent at the 2010 Commonwealth Games in Delhi, India, Asia.

== Senior career ==
=== Early career (2011–2013) ===
In February, Karmakar competed in the 2011 National Games of India, representing Tripura. She won gold medals in the all-around and all four events: floor, vault, balance beam and uneven bars.

=== Commonwealth and Asian medals and WC finals (2014–2015) ===
In July, at the 2014 Commonwealth Games, Karmakar won a bronze medal in the women's vault final, thanks largely to her Produnova vault, which had a difficulty value of 7.00. She received an average two-vault score of 14.366. She became the first Indian woman to win a Commonwealth Games gymnastics medal, and the second Indian overall, after Ashish Kumar.

At the 2014 Asian Games, Karmakar finished fourth in the vault final with a score of 14.200, behind Hong Un-jong, Oksana Chusovitina, and Phan Thị Hà Thanh.

At the Asian Championships, held in Hiroshima from 31 July – 2 August, Karmakar won the bronze in the women's vault while finishing 8th on the balance beam.

In October 2015, Karmakar became the first Indian gymnast to qualify for a final stage at the World Artistic Gymnastics Championships. She scored 14.900 on vault in the qualification round to secure her place for the finals, where she finished 5th with a two-vault average of 14.683.

==== 2015 World Artistic Gymnastics Championships ====
Round	Rank	Total	Score 1	Difficulty	Execution	Penalty	Score 2	Difficulty	Execution	Penalty
Qualification	7	14.900	15.100	7.000	8.100	0.00	14.700	6.000	8.700	0.00
Final	5	14.683	15.300	7.000	8.300	0.00	14.066	6.000	8.366	-0.300

=== Rio Olympics and further (2016–present) ===
On 10 August 2016 at the 2016 Olympic Test Event, Karmakar became the first female gymnast from India to qualify for the final vault event at the Olympics, with a score of 14.833. She missed out on the bronze medal, finishing fourth in the finals of the event with a score of 15.066 on 14 August 2016 at the Gymnastics Center in Rio de Janeiro, Brazil.

Karmakar is only the fifth woman in gymnastics history to land the Produnova vault, or the handspring double front. The Produnova is an artistic gymnastics vault consisting of a front handspring onto the vaulting horse and two front somersaults off. The vault has a 6.0 D-score under the 2022-2024 code of points, and until the addition of Simone Biles's vaults, it was the hardest vault performed in women's artistic gymnastics.

==== Schedule and 2016 Olympics results ====
Events	Women's floor exercise	Women's beam	Women's vault	Women's individual all-around	Women's vault
Rank	75	65	8	51	4
Point	12.033	12.866	14.850	51.665	15.066
Status	Completed	Completed	Completed	Completed	Completed
Results	Qualification	Qualification	Qualification	Qualification	Final, etc.

Karmakar nursed an injury throughout the latter half of 2017; she had injured her knee while practising for the trials of the 2017 Asian Artistic Gymnastics Championships. She underwent corrective surgery for her anterior cruciate ligament in April of the same year and was unable to participate in any events for the remainder of the competitive season. She also withdrew from the selection trials for the Indian team for the 2018 Commonwealth Games, citing her lack of preparedness. Her coach said that although she was healthy again, the lengthy rehabilitation process had restricted her training.

Karmakar won a gold medal in the vault event of FIG Artistic Gymnastics World Challenge Cup at Mersin, Turkey in July 2018. She thus became the first Indian gymnast to win a gold medal at a global event. In the same competition, she reached the finals of the balance beam event, finishing fourth.

Karmakar failed to qualify for the vault final at the 2018 Asian Games. She hurt her right knee, on which she had undergone surgery for an injury while landing during a practice session ahead of her participation in the women's qualification for team and apparatus finals. She also pulled out of team final.

=== Suspension ===
In a confirmation from the International Testing Agency in February 2023, it was revealed that Karmakar was serving a 21-month suspension after testing positive for a banned substance and that the suspension would end in mid-July 2023.

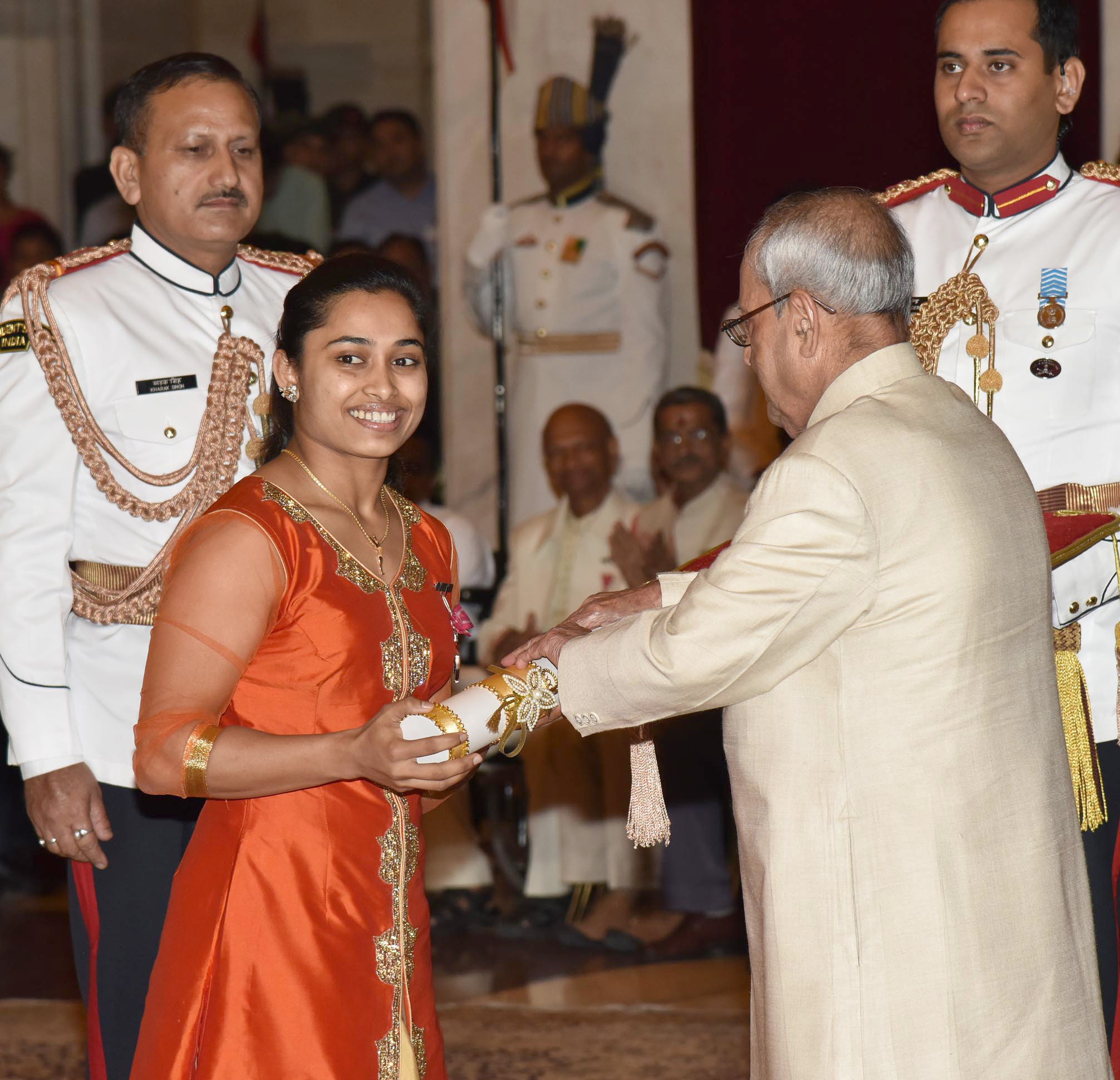
The President of India, Pranab Mukherjee, presenting the Padma Shri Award to Karmakar, at the Civil Investiture Ceremony, at Rashtrapati Bhavan, in New Delhi on 13 April 2017

== Awards ==
- Arjuna Award (2015)
- Major Dhyan Chand Khel Ratna Award (2016)
- Padma Shri (2017) - fourth highest Indian national honour.
- 2017: Among Forbes’ list of super achievers from Asia under the age of 30.
- Dronacharya Award - to her coach Bishweshwar Nandi.
- Gold - FIG Artistic Gymnastics World Challenge Cup at Mersin, Turkey
- Bronze - FIG Artistic Gymnastics World Cup at Cottbus, Germany

== Sponsorship ==
Since 2017, Karmakar has been supported by the GoSports Foundation under the Rahul Dravid Athlete Mentorship Programme.

== See also ==
- Sports in India - Overview of sports in India
- Gymnastics in India - Overview of Gymnastics sport in India
