= Gymnastics at the 2016 Summer Olympics – Women's vault =

Women's vault at the Games of the XXXI Olympiad
- Venue: HSBC Arena
- Date: 14 August 2016
- Competitors: 8 from 8 nations
- Winning score: 15.966

Medalists
1st place, gold medalist(s)		Simone Biles	United States
2nd place, silver medalist(s)		Maria Paseka	Russia
3rd place, bronze medalist(s)		Giulia Steingruber	Switzerland

The women's vault competition at the 2016 Summer Olympics in Rio de Janeiro, Brazil. The event was held at the HSBC Arena on 14 August.

The medals were presented by Larry Probst IOC member, and Nellie Kim, FIG Women's Artistic Gymnastics Technical Committee President.

== Competition format ==
The top eight qualifiers in the qualification phase (limit two per NOC) advanced to the apparatus final. Qualification scores were then ignored, with only final round scores counting. Each gymnast performed two vaults.

== Qualification ==
Rank	Gymnast	Vault 1				Vault 2				Total
Rank	Gymnast	D Score	E Score	Pen.	Score 1	D Score	E Score	Pen.	Score 2	Total
1	Simone Biles (USA)	6.300	9.700		16.000	6.400	9.700		16.100	16.050
2	Hong Un-jong (PRK)	6.300	9.466		15.766	6.400	9.200		15.600	15.683
3	Giulia Steingruber (SUI)	6.200	9.400		15.600	5.800	9.133		14.933	15.266
4	Maria Paseka (RUS)	6.400	8.633	-0.300	14.733	6.300	9.066		15.366	15.049
5	Oksana Chusovitina (UZB)	6.200	8.966		15.166	6.000	8.833		14.833	14.999
6	Shallon Olsen (CAN)	6.300	9.000		15.300	5.900	8.700		14.600	14.950
7	Wang Yan (CHN)	6.000	8.933		14.933	6.200	8.866	−0.100	14.966	14.949
8	Dipa Karmakar (IND)	7.000	8.100		15.100	6.000	8.600		14.600	14.850

=== Reserves ===
- Brittany Rogers (CAN)
- Seda Tutkhalyan (RUS)
- Elissa Downie (GBR)

== Final ==
	Name	Country	Date of birth (Age)
Youngest competitor	Shallon Olsen	Canada	July 10, 2000 (age 16)
Oldest competitor	Oksana Chusovitina	Uzbekistan	June 19, 1975 (age 41)

Rank	Gymnast	Vault 1				Vault 2				Total
Rank	Gymnast	D Score	E Score	Pen.	Score 1	D Score	E Score	Pen.	Score 2	Total
Gold medal	Simone Biles (USA)	6.300	9.600		15.900	6.400	9.633		16.033	15.966
Silver medal	Maria Paseka (RUS)	6.400	8.966	−0.100	15.266	6.300	8.941		15.241	15.253
Bronze medal	Giulia Steingruber (SUI)	6.200	9.333		15.533	5.800	9.100		14.900	15.216
4	Dipa Karmakar (IND)	6.000	8.866		14.866	7.000	8.266		15.266	15.066
5	Wang Yan (CHN)	6.000	8.866		14.866	6.200	8.933		15.133	14.999
6	Hong Un-jong (PRK)	6.400	9.000		15.400	6.300	8.200	−0.100	14.400	14.900
7	Oksana Chusovitina (UZB)	7.000	7.933		14.933	6.000	8.833	−0.100	14.733	14.833
8	Shallon Olsen (CAN)	6.300	8.666		14.966	5.900	8.766		14.666	14.816

== Notable moments ==
Simone Biles was the first gymnast since Larisa Latynina at the 1956 Olympics to win team gold, AA gold and vault gold in succession. Dipa Karmakar made history as the first ever Indian gymnastics event finalist, male or female. Simone Biles is the first American to have won Olympic gold on the vault. Giulia Steingruber's bronze was the first Olympic medal for a native Swiss gymnast in 64 years, and the very first one for the country in women's gymnastics.

Hong Un-jong tried to perform the TTY (Triple Twisting Yurchenko) for the first time in female artistic gymnastic history, but she fell and was only credited with the 2.5 twist, or Amanar. It would have been valued with a 6.8 D-Score.
