= Sham Lal (gymnast) =

Indian gymnast

- Born: 15 July 1938 (age 88) Lahore, British India

Gymnastics career
- Discipline: Men's artistic gymnastics
- Country represented: India

Sham Lal (born 1938) is an Indian gymnast. He competed in seven events at the 1956 Summer Olympics. He became first Indian to win the Arjuna Award in 1961 for gymnastics.
