= Ellie Black =

Canadian artistic gymnast (born 1995)

Ellie Black CM ONS
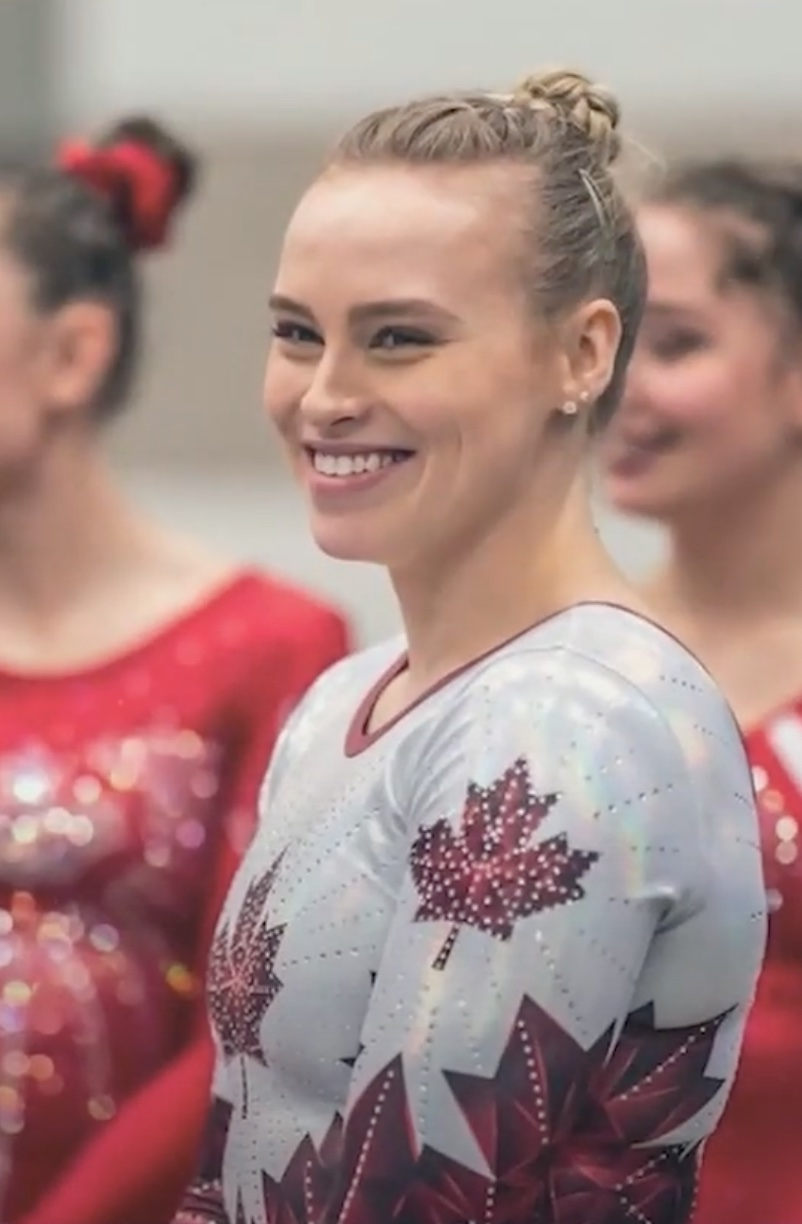
- Black in 2021

Personal information
- Full name: Elsabeth Ann Black
- Nickname: Ellie
- Born: 8 September 1995 (age 31) Halifax, Nova Scotia
- Height: 157 cm (5 ft 2 in)

Gymnastics career
- Discipline: Women's artistic gymnastics
- Country represented: Canada; (2010–present)
- Club: Halifax Alta Gymnastics
- Head coaches: Keiji Yamanaka, David Kikuchi
- Eponymous skills: Black (G): Piked clear-hip Tkatchev with ½ turn (Uneven bars)
Medal record
Women's artistic gymnastics
Representing Canada
World Championships
Silver medal – second place	2017 Montreal	All-around
Silver medal – second place	2022 Liverpool	Balance beam
Bronze medal – third place	2022 Liverpool	Team
Commonwealth Games
Gold medal – first place	2014 Glasgow	Balance beam
Gold medal – first place	2018 Gold Coast	Team
Gold medal – first place	2018 Gold Coast	All-around
Gold medal – first place	2026 Glasgow	All-around
Silver medal – second place	2014 Glasgow	Vault
Silver medal – second place	2018 Gold Coast	Vault
Silver medal – second place	2026 Glasgow	Team
Silver medal – second place	2026 Glasgow	Uneven bars
Bronze medal – third place	2014 Glasgow	Floor exercise
Pan American Games
Gold medal – first place	2015 Toronto	All-around
Gold medal – first place	2015 Toronto	Balance beam
Gold medal – first place	2015 Toronto	Floor exercise
Gold medal – first place	2019 Lima	All-around
Gold medal – first place	2019 Lima	Vault
Silver medal – second place	2015 Toronto	Team
Silver medal – second place	2019 Lima	Team
Silver medal – second place	2019 Lima	Balance beam
Bronze medal – third place	2015 Toronto	Vault
Bronze medal – third place	2019 Lima	Uneven bars
Pacific Rim Championships
Gold medal – first place	2014 Richmond	Vault
Silver medal – second place	2014 Richmond	Team
Bronze medal – third place	2014 Richmond	All-around
Summer Universiade
Gold medal – first place	2017 Taipei	Balance beam
Silver medal – second place	2013 Kazan	Floor exercise
Silver medal – second place	2017 Taipei	Team
Bronze medal – third place	2013 Kazan	Balance beam
Bronze medal – third place	2017 Taipei	All-around
Bronze medal – third place	2017 Taipei	Uneven bars
FIG World Cup
Event	1st	2nd	3rd
All-Around World Cup	0	1	3
Apparatus World Cup	1	0	0
World Challenge Cup	6	5	2
Total	7	6	5

Elsabeth Ann Black CM ONS (born 8 September 1995) is a Canadian artistic gymnast. She is a four-time Olympian, having represented her country at the 2012, 2016, 2020, and 2024 Olympic games. She is the 2017 World all-around silver medallist, making her the first Canadian gymnast to win a world all-around medal, and she led the Canadian women's gymnastics team to a bronze medal in the 2022 World Championships team final, the first world team medal won by a Canadian gymnastics team. She won a silver medal on the balance beam at the 2022 World Championships. She is a two-time Commonwealth Games all-around champion (2018, 2026), a two-time Pan American Games all-around champion (2015, 2019), and a six-time Canadian national all-around champion (2013-2015, 2017–2019). At the 2020 Olympic Games, Black placed fourth in the balance beam final, the highest placement in the Olympics for a female Canadian gymnast.

Black began competing internationally in 2012 and helped the 2012 Canadian Olympic team qualify for their first Olympic team final where they finished fifth. In 2013, she became the first Canadian female artistic gymnast to win a medal at the Universiade since 1983 by winning a silver medal on the floor exercise and a bronze medal on the balance beam. She competed at her first Commonwealth Games in 2014 and won the gold medal on the balance beam. She won five medals at the 2015 Pan American Games and was the most decorated Canadian athlete at the Games. At the 2016 Olympic Games, Black finished fifth in the individual all-around final, Canada's best-ever result in the Olympic all-around. She won her first World medal in 2017 and won team and all-around gold at the 2018 Commonwealth Games. In 2019, she became the first female gymnast to win back-to-back all-around titles at the Pan American Games and became Canada's most decorated gymnast ever at the Pan American Games. She made her third Olympic appearance in 2020 and won two medals at the 2022 World Championships. Black is the most decorated Canadian to ever compete in women's gymnastics.

== Early life ==
Black was born on 8 September 1995, in Halifax, Nova Scotia to parents Thomas and Katharine Black. Her older sister, Karen, competed in figure skating, and her younger brother William also competed in gymnastics. She began competitive gymnastics when she was nine years old, after watching the 2004 Summer Olympics. Originally, she trained in both gymnastics and figure skating.

== Junior career ==
In December 2008, Black competed at the junior level at Elite Canada, an annual event for elite-level Canadian gymnasts, and placed sixteenth in the all-around and won the bronze medal on vault. Then at 2009 Elite Canada in Oakville, Ontario, she placed tenth in the all-around competition and third on vault. At the 2010 Canadian Championships in Kamloops, British Columbia, she placed fourteenth in the all-around final. In event finals, she placed third on vault and won the balance beam title. Then in December 2010, she competed at Elite Canada in Gatineau, Quebec. She placed fourteenth in the all-around, and she won the silver medal on vault.

== Senior career ==
=== 2011 ===
Black became age-eligible for senior international competition in 2011, but she missed the entire 2011 season after having surgery for a dislocated and broken toe and then dislocating her elbow.

=== 2012 ===
In February, Black made her senior debut at Elite Canada in Mississauga, Canada, and placed ninth in the all-around. In event finals, Black won the gold medal on vault and the bronze medal on balance beam. Then in March, she made her international debut at the International Gymnix held in Montreal and finished second in the all-around. Then in the event finals, she won the gold medal on vault and the silver medal on balance beam. She then competed at the Osijek World Challenge Cup and won her first FIG World Cup medals with gold on both the vault and floor exercise. Black's results at these international competitions suddenly made her a strong contender for the 2012 Olympic team. In May, Black competed at the Canadian Championships in Regina, Canada. She placed third all-around in qualifications but dropped to seventh in the all-around final. In event finals, she placed first on vault and third on floor.

At the end of June, Black was one of the twelve gymnasts chosen to compete at the Final Olympic Selection meet in Gatineau, Canada. On the first day of competition she placed sixth in the all-around and second on vault. Based on her performances here and at the Canadian Championships, she was selected to the five-member Olympic team alongside Kristina Vaculik, Victoria Moors, Brittany Rogers, and Dominique Pegg. She was the first female gymnast living east of Montreal to ever make the Canadian Olympic team. In July, Black made her Olympic debut at the 2012 Summer Olympics in London, United Kingdom. She helped the Canadian team qualify for the team finals for the first time since 1984, and individually, she qualified for the vault final. In the team final, the Canadian team finished fifth, the country's best ever result in an Olympic team final. In the vault final, Black injured her left ankle on her first vault after landing on all fours, receiving a score of 0.000. She tried to attempt her second vault, but decided not to because of the injury, meaning she placed eighth with a final score of 0.000. She did not compete for the rest of the year due to the injury, and once she recovered, she focused on learning new skills and aimed to improve her competition results for the upcoming season.

=== 2013 ===
At her first all-around FIG World Cup event in Tokyo, Black won the bronze medal. She won gold medals in the vault, balance beam, and floor exercise event finals at the Ljubljana World Challenge Cup and was the most decorated gymnast of the event. In May, Black won her first national all-around title at the Canadian Championships and also won balance beam gold, floor exercise silver, and vault bronze. At the Summer Universiade, Black finished fourth in the all-around with a score of 55.000, only two-tenths of a point away from the bronze medal. In the event finals, she finished fourth on vault by 0.088, third on beam, and tied for second on floor. This marked the first time a Canadian gymnast had won a medal at the Universiade since 1983. She then competed at her first World Championships and finished thirteenth in the all-around and eighth on the floor exercise.

=== 2014 ===
Black won the all-around and floor exercise gold medals at the International Gymnix and the uneven bars and balance beam bronze medals. She then competed at the Pacific Rim Championships with Yu, Maegan Chant, Rose-Kaying Woo, Shallon Olsen, and Megan Roberts, and they won the team silver medal behind the United States. Individually, Black won the all-around bronze medal and the vault gold medal. She defended her Canadian all-around title and also became national champion on the uneven bars.

At the Commonwealth Games, Black finished fourth with her team and was upset for the bronze medal by Wales, and she fourth in the all-around due to a fall on the floor exercise. In the event finals, Black won gold on the balance beam, silver on the vault, and bronze on the floor exercise. She competed at the World Championships in Nanning, China. The Canadian team finished twelfth and failed to advance to the team final, but Black qualified for the all-around and balance beam finals. In the all-around final, she placed ninth, the highest ever placement in a World or Olympic all-around final by a Canadian, besting compatriot Victoria Moors' tenth-place finish from the year before. In the balance beam final, she placed seventh after a fall. After the World Championships, she competed at the Stuttgart World Cup and finished seventh in the all-around and won the silver medal in the all-around at the Glasgow World Cup.

=== 2015 ===
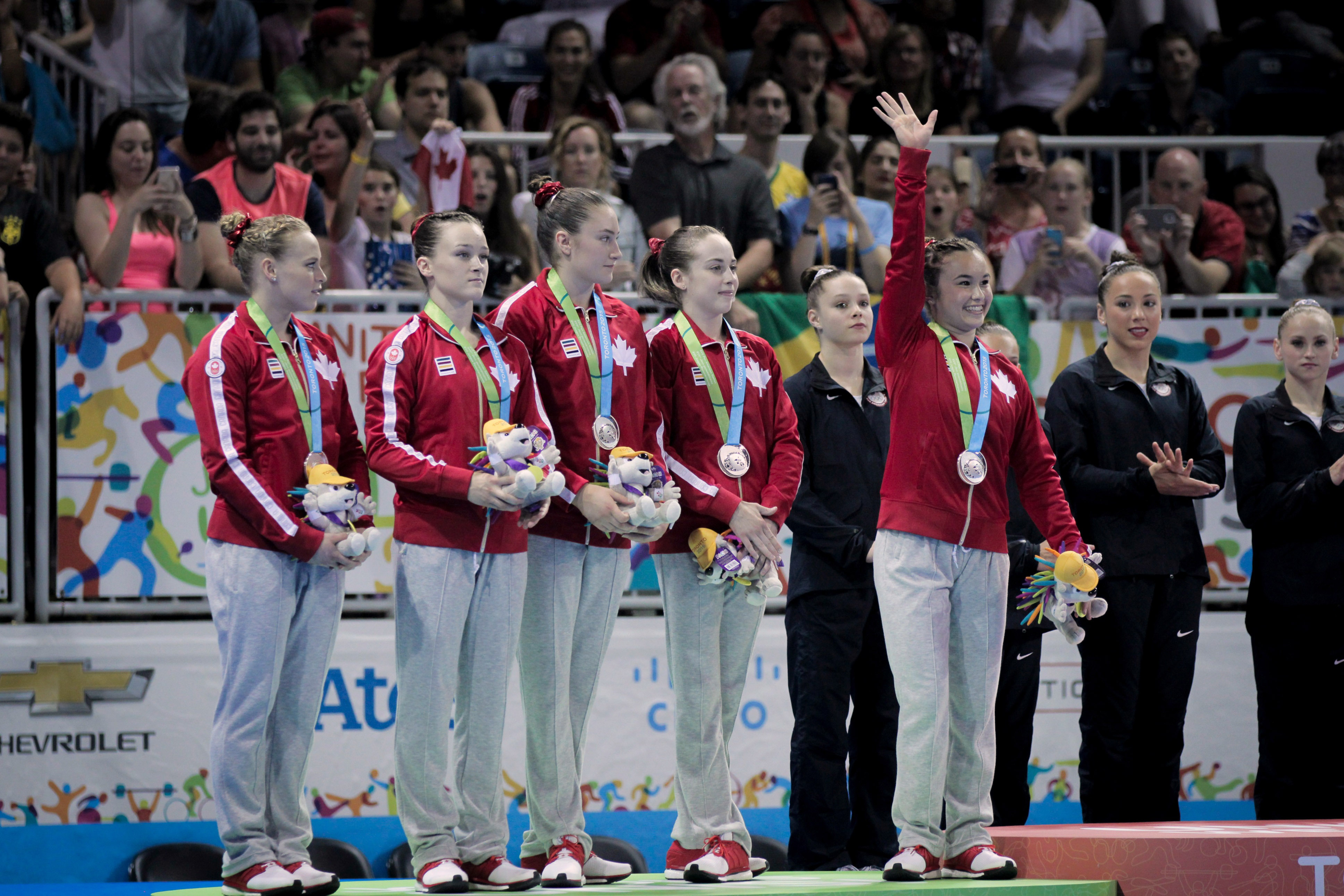
Black (left) and the Canadian team at the 2015 Pan American Games

In January, Black competed at the Elite Canada competition and won the balance beam title. She then competed at the American Cup in Arlington, Texas and placed fifth with an all-around. Then at the City of Jesolo Trophy and helped the Canadian team win the bronze medal behind the United States and Italy. Individually, Black won the bronze medal on the vault. In May, Black won her third consecutive Canadian all-around title. Black competed at her first Pan American Games which was hosted in Toronto. The Canadian team of Black, Maegan Chant, Madison Copiak, Isabela Onyshko, and Victoria-Kayen Woo won a silver medal behind the United States. In the all-around final, Black won the gold medal with a score of 58.150, becoming the first non-American woman to become Pan American all-around champion since 1983 and the first Canadian to win the title since 1979. She then won the bronze medal in the vault final. In the balance beam final, she won gold by over a full point, and she also won the gold medal in the floor exercise final. She was the most decorated Canadian athlete of the 2015 Pan American Games.

In September, Black was selected to compete at the World Championships. The Canadian team had a strong performance in the qualifying round and qualified for the team final in seventh place, ensuring a full team berth at the 2016 Olympic Games. Black also qualified to the all-around final in fourth place and in third place to the balance beam final. In the team finals, she contributed scores of 14.233 on the floor, 15.100 on the vault, and 13.566 on the beam to help the Canadian team finish sixth, their best-ever team finish at a World Championships. In the all-around final, she set a new record for the highest placement by a Canadian by finishing in seventh place. In the beam final, she fell on her full twist and finished in seventh place for the second year in a row.

=== 2016 ===
At Elite Canada, Black won the all-around bronze medal. She then competed at the American Cup in Newark, New Jersey and won the all-around bronze medal. Then at the Canadian Championships, she won the all-around silver medal. Black was chosen to represent Canada at her second Olympic Games in Rio de Janeiro alongside Isabela Onyshko, Shallon Olsen, Brittany Rogers, and Rose-Kaying Woo. The team did not reach the top eight for the team final because they finished in ninth place by only 0.168 points behind the Dutch team. In the all-around final, Black finished in fifth place with a score of 58.298, the highest place finish for a Canadian gymnast in the all-around at the Olympic Games.

=== 2017 ===
Black's first competition after the 2016 Olympic Games was the Koper World Challenge Cup, where she won silver medals on uneven bars, balance beam, and floor exercise. In May, she won her fourth national all-around title. At the Summer Universiade, she led the Canadian team to the silver medal behind Russia. Individually, she won bronze in the all-around final. In the event finals, she won gold on the beam and bronze on the bars. At the World Championships in Montreal, Black qualified for the all-around final in third place, the vault final in seventh, and the balance beam final in fourth. She was originally a reserve for the floor exercise final but was put in as a replacement for the injured American Ragan Smith. In the all-around final, Black became the first Canadian to win an all-around medal at the World Championships, winning the silver medal behind American Morgan Hurd. During event finals, she placed fourth on vault, eighth on balance beam after a fall, and seventh on floor exercise after an out-of-bounds deduction.

=== 2018 ===
Black competed at her second Commonwealth Games alongside Shallon Olsen, Isabela Onyshko, Brittany Rogers, and Rose-Kaying Woo. She helped Canada win gold for the first time since the 1990 Commonwealth Games ahead of second place England in the team finals. Individually, Black won gold in the all-around. She also won silver on vault. In May, Black competed at the Canadian Championships where she won her fifth national all-around title. Then in September, she competed at the Paris Challenge Cup where she won silver on vault, bronze on uneven bars, gold on balance beam, and silver on floor exercise. She was the only female gymnast at the event to medal on all four apparatuses. She was then named to the team to compete at the World Championships. She helped Canada place fourth in the team final which was Canada's highest-ever team finish at the World Artistic Gymnastics Championships. Individually, Black placed twelfth in the all-around, seventh on vault, and fifth on the balance beam.

=== 2019 ===
Black began the 2019 season competing at Elite Canada where she placed second in the all-around. She also won gold on vault, silver on uneven bars and balance beam, and bronze on floor exercise. In March, Black competed at the American Cup where she tied for the bronze medal in the all-around with Mai Murakami. The following month, she competed at the Tokyo World Cup where she won silver in the all-around. In May, she competed at the Canadian Championships and claimed her sixth national all-around title. Additionally, she won gold on floor exercise, silver on uneven bars, and bronze on the balance beam. In June, Black was named to the team to compete at the Pan American Games alongside Moors, Isabela Onyshko Shallon Olsen, and Victoria-Kayen Woo. The team won the silver medal in the team final behind the United States. In the all-around final, Black was able to defend her Pan American Games all-around title and was the first gymnast to ever do so. During the first day of event finals, she won gold on vault and bronze on uneven bars. The following day, she won the silver medal on balance beam. With a total of nine Pan American Games medals including five gold medals, she became the most decorated Canadian gymnast in Pan American Games history. She was selected as Canada's flag-bearer for the closing ceremony.

On 4 September, Black was named to the team to compete at the World Championships in Stuttgart, Germany. During qualifications, the team placed fifth, thereby qualifying Canada a team to the 2020 Olympic Games in Tokyo. Individually, she qualified for the all-around and balance beam finals. Black competed on all four apparatuses during the team final, helping Canada place seventh. During the individual all-around final, she finished in fourth place with a score of 56.232, only 0.167 points behind third place. While competing in the all-around final, she injured her ankle and had to withdraw from the balance beam final.

=== 2020 ===
In February, Black made her season debut at Elite Canada and won the gold medal on the uneven bars. Then at the American Cup, she placed fifth in the all-around. She was scheduled to compete at the Tokyo World Cup taking place on 4 April. However, the Tokyo World Cup was later canceled due to the coronavirus outbreak in Japan.

=== 2021 ===
Black competed at Elite Canada which was held virtually due to the COVID-19 pandemic in Canada. She finished first in the all-around and on the balance beam. She then competed at the Canadian Championships where she won her seventh national all-around title. Additionally, she finished first on the balance beam and second on the vault, uneven bars, and floor exercise. On 17 June, she was officially named to Canada's 2020 Olympic team alongside Ava Stewart, Shallon Olsen, and Brooklyn Moors. During the Olympic qualification round, the Canadian team finished tenth, missing out on the team final. Individually, Black qualified for the all-around final in twenty-fourth place and for the balance beam final in sixth place, and she was the third reserve for the vault final. During a training session before the all-around final, she injured her left ankle on a balance beam dismount, causing her to withdraw from the all-around final. She still competed in the balance beam final despite the injury, and she finished in fourth place, 0.134 points away from the bronze medal. After the Olympic Games, Black traveled across the United States on the Gold Over America Tour.

=== 2022 ===
Black won the all-around title at the virtual Elite Canada competition. She then competed at the City of Jesolo Trophy where she helped Canada finish third behind the United States and Italy. Individually, she won bronze on vault. In September, she competed at the Paris World Challenge Cup and won bronze on the balance beam. She also competed a brand new skill on the uneven bars, a piked clear-hip Tkatchev with ½ turn, and got the skill named after her in the Code of Points. Black was selected to compete at the World Championships in Liverpool alongside Laurie Denommée, Emma Spence, Sydney Turner, and Denelle Pedrick. She helped Canada qualify for the team final in eighth place and individually qualified for the all-around, vault, and balance beam finals. During the team final, Black competed on all four apparatuses and helped Canada win the bronze medal, their first team medal at the World Artistic Gymnastics Championships. This bronze medal also earned Canada a team quota for the 2024 Olympic Games. She then finished fifth in the all-around final with a total score of 54.732. In the vault event final, she finished fourth. Then in the balance beam final, she won the silver medal with a score of 13.566.

=== 2024 ===
In late June Black was named to the team to represent Canada at the 2024 Summer Olympics alongside Cassie Lee, Shallon Olsen, Ava Stewart, and Aurélie Tran.

At the 2024 Olympic Games Black helped Canada qualify to the team final, where they ultimately finished fifth. Individually she qualified to the all-around and vault finals where she finished sixth in both.

=== 2025 ===
In April of 2025, Black competed on vault and uneven bars at the Cairo World Cup, winning the gold medal in the vault final.

In early October, Black was named to the Canadian team for the 2025 World Gymnastics Championships, along with Shallon Olsen, Lia-Monica Fontaine, and Gabrielle Black. She competed on uneven bars and balance beam during the qualification round and qualified for the beam final, where she ultimately finished in fifth place.

=== 2026 ===
Black competed in the all-around at the 2026 Canadian Championships, where she won the bronze medal on balance beam.

In July, Black competed at the 2026 Commonwealth Games alongside teammates Gabrielle Black, Lia-Monica Fontaine, Alyssa Guerrier-Calixte, and Lia Redick. The Canadian team won silver, and individually, she qualified for the all-around, uneven bars, and balance beam finals. She won the gold medal in the all-around final, becoming the first gymnast, male or female, to win more than one all-around title at the Commonwealth Games.

Black was named to the Canadian team for the 2026 World Championships, her tenth World Championship appearance.

== Awards ==
In 2018, the Nova Scotia Sports Hall of Fame named Black one of the 15 greatest athletes in Nova Scotian history. In October 2018, the Lieutenant-Governor of Nova Scotia, Arthur LeBlanc, announced that Black would be appointed Member of the Order of Nova Scotia (ONS) at a ceremony to be held on 6 November, for her contribution as an ambassador for both gymnastics and the province. Black was only the second person under 25 to receive the ONS, the first being hockey star Sidney Crosby.

After the 2024 Summer Olympics Black was awarded the Paris 2024 Fair Play Award, a joint award from the International Fair Play Committee and International Olympic Committee, recognizing her spirit of fair play, sportsmanship, and respect for others.

She was appointed a Member of the Order of Canada (CM) on 31 December 2025.

== Sponsors and endorsements ==
In 2019, Black became sponsored by Toyota Canada as a part of its Team Toyota initiative. She has a collection of gymnastics equipment with Spieth America. She is sponsored by the Royal Bank of Canada, and in 2020, she supported the Canada United relief fund for small businesses. In 2021, she began working with the sports nutrition brand MuscleTech.

== Personal life ==
Black has taken kinesiology courses at Dalhousie University. She enjoys cooking, and she has shared her recipes online.

== Eponymous skill ==
At the 2022 Paris World Challenge Cup, Black completed a piked clear-hip Tkatchev with ½ turn on the uneven bars. Because she was the first gymnast to complete this skill, it is named after her in the Code of Points.

Apparatus	Name	Description	Difficulty (Note: Valid for the 2025–2028 Code of Points)	Added to the Code of Points
Uneven bars	Black	Clear hip circle on high bar, counter pike over high bar with ½ turn (180°) to hang in mixed L grip	F	2022 Paris World Challenge Cup

== Competitive history ==
Competitive history of Ellie Black at the junior level
Year	Event	Team	AA	VT	UB	BB	FX
2008	Elite Canada		16	3rd place, bronze medalist(s)			
2009	Elite Canada		10	3rd place, bronze medalist(s)			
2010	Canadian Championships		14	3rd place, bronze medalist(s)		1st place, gold medalist(s)	
2010	Elite Canada		14	2nd place, silver medalist(s)		4	8

Competitive history of Ellie Black at the senior level
Year	Event	Team	AA	VT	UB	BB	FX
2012	Elite Canada		9	1st place, gold medalist(s)		3rd place, bronze medalist(s)	7
2012	International Gymnix		2nd place, silver medalist(s)	1st place, gold medalist(s)		3rd place, bronze medalist(s)	4
2012	2nd AG Meeting	1st place, gold medalist(s)		1st place, gold medalist(s)		1st place, gold medalist(s)	
2012	Osijek World Challenge Cup			1st place, gold medalist(s)			1st place, gold medalist(s)
2012	Canadian Championships		7	1st place, gold medalist(s)		7	3rd place, bronze medalist(s)
2012	Final Olympic Selection		6				
2012	Olympic Games	5		8			
2013	Elite Canada		1st place, gold medalist(s)	1st place, gold medalist(s)	1st place, gold medalist(s)	1st place, gold medalist(s)	2nd place, silver medalist(s)
2013	Tokyo World Cup		3rd place, bronze medalist(s)				
2013	Ljubljana World Challenge Cup			1st place, gold medalist(s)	5	1st place, gold medalist(s)	1st place, gold medalist(s)
2013	Canadian Championships		1st place, gold medalist(s)	3rd place, bronze medalist(s)		1st place, gold medalist(s)	2nd place, silver medalist(s)
2013	Universiade		4	4		3rd place, bronze medalist(s)	2nd place, silver medalist(s)
2013	World Championships		13				8
2014	Elite Canada		3rd place, bronze medalist(s)		2nd place, silver medalist(s)	1st place, gold medalist(s)	
2014	International Gymnix		1st place, gold medalist(s)		3rd place, bronze medalist(s)	3rd place, bronze medalist(s)	1st place, gold medalist(s)
2014	Pacific Rim Championships	2nd place, silver medalist(s)	3rd place, bronze medalist(s)	1st place, gold medalist(s)	5	6	4
2014	Canadian Championships		1st place, gold medalist(s)		1st place, gold medalist(s)		
2014	Commonwealth Games	4	4	2nd place, silver medalist(s)	4	1st place, gold medalist(s)	3rd place, bronze medalist(s)
2014	World Championships	12	9			7	
2014	Stuttgart World Cup		7				
2014	Glasgow World Cup		2nd place, silver medalist(s)				
2015	Elite Canada					1st place, gold medalist(s)	
2015	American Cup		5				
2015	City of Jesolo Trophy	3rd place, bronze medalist(s)	12	3rd place, bronze medalist(s)		7	4
2015	Canadian Championships		1st place, gold medalist(s)		2nd place, silver medalist(s)	1st place, gold medalist(s)	2nd place, silver medalist(s)
2015	Pan American Games	2nd place, silver medalist(s)	1st place, gold medalist(s)	3rd place, bronze medalist(s)		1st place, gold medalist(s)	1st place, gold medalist(s)
2015	World Championships	6	7			7	
2016	Elite Canada		3rd place, bronze medalist(s)	2nd place, silver medalist(s)	4	2nd place, silver medalist(s)	2nd place, silver medalist(s)
2016	American Cup		3rd place, bronze medalist(s)				
2016	Canadian Championships		2nd place, silver medalist(s)	3rd place, bronze medalist(s)	11	2nd place, silver medalist(s)	1st place, gold medalist(s)
2016	Canadian Olympic Trials		1st place, gold medalist(s)	1st place, gold medalist(s)	3rd place, bronze medalist(s)	3rd place, bronze medalist(s)	1st place, gold medalist(s)
2016	Olympic Games	9	5				
2017	Koper World Challenge Cup			4	2nd place, silver medalist(s)	2nd place, silver medalist(s)	2nd place, silver medalist(s)
2017	Canadian Championships		1st place, gold medalist(s)	2nd place, silver medalist(s)	6	2nd place, silver medalist(s)	1st place, gold medalist(s)
2017	Summer Universiade	2nd place, silver medalist(s)	3rd place, bronze medalist(s)	4	3rd place, bronze medalist(s)	1st place, gold medalist(s)	4
2017	World Championships		2nd place, silver medalist(s)	4		8	7
2017	Toyota International			3rd place, bronze medalist(s)		5	
2018	Elite Canada				7		
2018	Commonwealth Games	1st place, gold medalist(s)	1st place, gold medalist(s)	2nd place, silver medalist(s)		6	4
2018	Canadian Championships		1st place, gold medalist(s)	3rd place, bronze medalist(s)	1st place, gold medalist(s)	1st place, gold medalist(s)	2nd place, silver medalist(s)
2018	Paris World Challenge Cup			2nd place, silver medalist(s)	3rd place, bronze medalist(s)	1st place, gold medalist(s)	2nd place, silver medalist(s)
2018	World Championships	4	12	7		5	
2019	Elite Canada		2nd place, silver medalist(s)	1st place, gold medalist(s)	2nd place, silver medalist(s)	2nd place, silver medalist(s)	3rd place, bronze medalist(s)
2019	American Cup		3rd place, bronze medalist(s)				
2019	Tokyo World Cup		2nd place, silver medalist(s)				
2019	Canadian Championships		1st place, gold medalist(s)		2nd place, silver medalist(s)	3rd place, bronze medalist(s)	1st place, gold medalist(s)
2019	Pan American Games	2nd place, silver medalist(s)	1st place, gold medalist(s)	1st place, gold medalist(s)	3rd place, bronze medalist(s)	2nd place, silver medalist(s)	4
2019	World Championships	7	4			WD	
2020	Elite Canada				1st place, gold medalist(s)	4	
2020	American Cup		5				
2021	Elite Canada		1st place, gold medalist(s)		2nd place, silver medalist(s)	1st place, gold medalist(s)	2nd place, silver medalist(s)
2021	Canadian Championships		1st place, gold medalist(s)	2nd place, silver medalist(s)	2nd place, silver medalist(s)	1st place, gold medalist(s)	2nd place, silver medalist(s)
2021	Olympic Games	R2	WD	R3		4	
2022	Elite Canada		1st place, gold medalist(s)		1st place, gold medalist(s)		
2022	City of Jesolo Trophy	3rd place, bronze medalist(s)	15	3rd place, bronze medalist(s)		6	
2022	Paris World Challenge Cup				4	3rd place, bronze medalist(s)	
2022	World Championships	3rd place, bronze medalist(s)	5	4		2nd place, silver medalist(s)	
2023
2023	World Championships	12	16	5	8		
2024	International Gymnix	1st place, gold medalist(s)	1st place, gold medalist(s)		1st place, gold medalist(s)	3rd place, bronze medalist(s)	1st place, gold medalist(s)
2024	City of Jesolo Trophy	4	1st place, gold medalist(s)		8	7	8
2024	Canadian Championships		1st place, gold medalist(s)		1st place, gold medalist(s)	3rd place, bronze medalist(s)	1st place, gold medalist(s)
2024	Olympic Games	5	6	6			R3
2025	Cairo World Cup			1st place, gold medalist(s)	7		
2025	World Championships					5	
2026	Canadian Championships		8			3rd place, bronze medalist(s)	
2026	Commonwealth Games	2nd place, silver medalist(s)	1st place, gold medalist(s)		2nd place, silver medalist(s)	4	
2026	World Championships	8	16	5			

== See also ==
- List of Olympic female artistic gymnasts for Canada
- List of female artistic gymnasts with the most appearances at Olympic Games
