= Shooting at the 2014 Asian Games – Men's 10 metre running target mixed =

Men's 10 metre running target mixed at the 2014 Asian Games
- Venue: Ongnyeon International Shooting Range
- Dates: 27 September 2014
- Competitors: 18 from 6 nations

Medalists
gold medal	Kim Ji-song	North Korea
silver medal	Zhai Yujia	China
bronze medal	Jeong You-jin	South Korea

The men's 10 metre running target mixed competition at the 2014 Asian Games in Incheon, South Korea was held on 27 September at the Ongnyeon International Shooting Range.

== Schedule ==
All times are Korea Standard Time (UTC+09:00)

Date	Time	Event
Saturday, 27 September 2014	09:00	Final

== Records ==
Prior to this competition, the existing world, Asian and Games records were as follows.

World Record	Vladislav Prianishnikov (UKR)	393	Winterthur, Switzerland	26 February 2008
Asian Record	Niu Zhiyuan (CHN)	390	Barcelona, Spain	20 July 1998
Games Record	Gan Lin (CHN)	389	Doha, Qatar	6 December 2006

== Results ==
Rank	Athlete	Stage 1		Stage 2		Total	Xs	S-off	Notes
Rank	Athlete	1	2	1	2	Total	Xs	S-off	Notes
1st place, gold medalist(s)	Kim Ji-song (PRK)	96	98	95	95	384	9		
2nd place, silver medalist(s)	Zhai Yujia (CHN)	94	96	95	98	383	15		
3rd place, bronze medalist(s)	Jeong You-jin (KOR)	96	96	92	97	381	6		
4	Zhang Jie (CHN)	94	96	97	91	378	10		
5	Trần Hoàng Vũ (VIE)	95	93	94	96	378	8		
6	Pak Myong-won (PRK)	96	93	96	93	378	8		
7	Xie Durun (CHN)	94	93	95	96	378	7		
8	Ngô Hữu Vượng (VIE)	91	94	96	95	376	7		
9	Jo Yong-chol (PRK)	91	97	94	93	375	12		
10	Cho Se-jong (KOR)	94	91	92	94	371	7		
11	Bakhtiyar Ibrayev (KAZ)	94	93	90	94	371	6		
12	Đỗ Đức Hùng (VIE)	91	93	91	94	369	8		
13	Andrey Gurov (KAZ)	94	93	91	88	366	6		
14	Rassim Mologly (KAZ)	91	88	94	92	365	6		
15	Hwang Young-do (KOR)	93	93	87	91	364	7		
16	Mohammed Amin Sobhi (QAT)	89	91	95	89	364	4		
17	Mohammed Abouteama (QAT)	90	90	93	90	363	3		
18	Khalid Al-Kuwari (QAT)	89	88	90	93	360	9		
