= Shooting at the 2010 Asian Games – Men's 10 metre running target =

Competition held in Asian Games 2010 in China

Men's 10 metre running target at the 2010 Asian Games
- Venue: Aoti Shooting Range
- Dates: 16 November 2010
- Competitors: 19 from 7 nations

Medalists
gold medal	Zhai Yujia	China
silver medal	Jo Yong-chol	North Korea
bronze medal	Jeong You-jin	South Korea

The men's 10 metre running target competition at the 2010 Asian Games in Guangzhou, China was held on 16 November at the Aoti Shooting Range.

== Schedule ==
All times are China Standard Time (UTC+08:00)

Date	Time	Event
Tuesday, 16 November 2010	09:00	Slow
Tuesday, 16 November 2010	12:00	Fast

== Records ==
Prior to this competition, the existing world, Asian and Games records were as follows.

World Record	Manfred Kurzer (GER)	590	Athens, Greece	19 August 2004
Asian Record	Yang Ling (CHN)	588	Lahti, Finland	5 July 2002
Games Record	Niu Zhiyuan (CHN)	579	Busan, South Korea	4 October 2002

== Results ==
Rank	Athlete	Slow			Fast			Total	Xs	S-off	Notes
Rank	Athlete	1	2	3	1	2	3	Total	Xs	S-off	Notes
1st place, gold medalist(s)	Zhai Yujia (CHN)	97	98	100	99	98	98	590	17		AR
2nd place, silver medalist(s)	Jo Yong-chol (PRK)	91	99	98	94	94	96	572	19	19	
3rd place, bronze medalist(s)	Jeong You-jin (KOR)	94	97	99	95	91	96	572	18	17	
4	Gan Lin (CHN)	95	97	94	92	97	94	569	12		
5	Andrey Gurov (KAZ)	92	98	99	94	93	93	569	11		
6	Pak Myong-won (PRK)	95	98	95	95	89	96	568	6		
7	Rassim Mologly (KAZ)	95	96	96	96	88	95	566	15		
8	Ngô Hữu Vượng (VIE)	97	95	95	90	93	96	566	14		
9	Yang Ling (CHN)	92	87	96	94	96	94	559	14		
10	Kim Ji-song (PRK)	95	91	96	85	94	97	558	10		
11	Bakhtiyar Ibrayev (KAZ)	97	92	93	88	94	92	556	9		
12	Hwang Young-do (KOR)	92	94	93	91	94	91	555	8		
13	Trần Hoàng Vũ (VIE)	92	95	96	90	92	89	554	10		
14	Nguyễn Văn Tùng (VIE)	93	92	96	87	90	94	552	7		
15	Cho Se-jong (KOR)	88	94	96	93	87	91	549	10		
16	Khalid Al-Kuwari (QAT)	91	85	96	94	91	91	548	9		
17	Mongkonchai Meechu (THA)	92	96	92	93	88	87	548	7		
18	Mohammed Abouteama (QAT)	92	93	90	86	90	95	546	8		
19	Mohammed Amin Sobhi (QAT)	96	93	94	86	86	90	545	8		
