= North Korea at the 2014 Asian Games =

- IOC code: PRK
- NOC: Olympic Committee of the Democratic People's Republic of Korea

in Incheon
- Competitors: 150 in 14 sports
- Medals Ranked 7th: Gold 11 Silver 11 Bronze 14 Total 36

Asian Games appearances (overview)
- 1974; 1978; 1982; 1986; 1990; 1994; 1998; 2002; 2006; 2010; 2014; 2018; 2022; 2026

Korea DPR participated in the 2014 Asian Games in Incheon, South Korea from 19 September to 4 October 2014.

== Background ==
North Korea is a member of the Olympic Council of Asia and has competed in the Asian Games since the 1974 Asian Games in Tehran.

== Medal summary ==
=== Medal table ===
Sport	Gold	Silver	Bronze	Total
Gymnastics	2	1	1	4
Diving	0	1	2	3
Swimming	0	0	1	1
Judo	0	1	4	5
Table Tennis	1	0	2	3
Weightlifting	4	3	2	9
Shooting	1	3	1	5
Wrestling	1	1	1	3
Boxing	1	0	0	1
Football	1	1	0	2
Total	11	11	14	36

=== Medalists ===
Medal	Name	Sport	Event	Date
Gold	Jang Un-hui	Boxing	Women's 75 kg	1 Oct
Gold	North Korea women's football team	Football	Women's tournament	1 Oct
Gold	Hong Un-jong	Gymnastics	Women's vault	24 Sep
Gold	Kim Un-hyang	Gymnastics	Women's balance beam	25 Sep
Gold	Kim Ji-song	Shooting	Men's 10 m running target mixed	27 Sep
Gold	Kim Hyok-bong; Kim Jong	Table tennis	Mixed doubles	3 Oct
Gold	Om Yun-chol	Weightlifting	Men's 56 kg	20 Sep
Gold	Kim Un-guk	Weightlifting	Men's 62 kg	21 Sep
Gold	Ri Jong-hwa	Weightlifting	Women's 58 kg	22 Sep
Gold	Kim Un-ju	Weightlifting	Women's 75 kg	25 Sep
Gold	Jong Hak-jin	Wrestling	Men's freestyle 57 kg	27 Sep
Silver	Kim Un-hyang; Song Nam-hyang	Diving	Women's synchronized 10 m platform	30 Sep
Silver	North Korea men's football team	Football	Men's tournament	2 Oct
Silver	Hong Un-jong; Jong Ung-yong; Kang Yong-mi; Kim So-yong; Kim Un-hyang; Ri Un-ha	Gymnastics	Women's team	22 Sep
Silver	Sol Kyong	Judo	Women's 78 kg	22 Sep
Silver	Jo Yong-chol	Shooting	Men's 10 m running target	25 Sep
Silver	Jo Yong-chol; Kim Ji-song; Pak Myong-won	Shooting	Men's 10 m running target team	25 Sep
Silver	Jo Yong-chol; Kim Ji-song; Pak Myong-won	Shooting	Men's 10 m running target mixed team	27 Sep
Silver	Kim Myong-hyok	Weightlifting	Men's 69 kg	22 Sep
Silver	Kim Kwang-song	Weightlifting	Men's 77 kg	23 Sep
Silver	Ryo Un-hui	Weightlifting	Women's 69 kg	24 Sep
Silver	Yun Won-chol	Wrestling	Men's Greco-Roman 59 kg	30 Sep
Bronze	Kim Un-hyang	Diving	Women's 10 m platform	2 Oct
Bronze	Choe Un-gyong; Kim Jin-ok	Diving	Women's synchronized 3 m springboard	2 Oct
Bronze	Kang Yong-mi	Gymnastics	Women's uneven bars	25 Sep
Bronze	Hong Kuk-hyong	Judo	Men's 73 kg	21 Sep
Bronze	Kim Sol-mi	Judo	Women's 48 kg	20 Sep
Bronze	Ri Hyo-sun	Judo	Women's 57 kg	21 Sep
Bronze	Kim Sol-mi; Ri Chang-ok; Ri Hyo-sun; Kim Su-gyong; Kim Jong-sun; Sol Kyong	Judo	Women's team	23 Sep
Bronze	Chae Hye-gyong; Pak Yong-hui; Yang So-li	Shooting	Women's trap team	23 Sep
Bronze	Jong Na-ri; Jong Yon-hui; Kang Un-ha; Kim Jin-gyong; Kim Jong-hui; Kim Ju-hye; Kim U-na; Ri Il-sim; Ri Ji-hyang; Yun Yu-jong	Synchronized swimming	Women's team	22 Sep
Bronze	Kim Hye-song; Kim Jong; Kim Song-i; Ri Mi-gyong; Ri Myong-sun	Table tennis	Women's team	30 Sep
Bronze	Kim Jong; Kim Hye-song	Table tennis	Women's doubles	3 Oct
Bronze	Jo Pok-hyang	Weightlifting	Women's 63 kg	23 Sep
Bronze	Rim Jong-sim	Weightlifting	Women's 75 kg	25 Sep
Bronze	Ri Hak-won	Wrestling	Men's Greco-Roman 66 kg	1 Oct
