= Shooting at the 2014 Asian Games – Men's 10 metre running target =

Men's 10 metre running target at the 2014 Asian Games
- Venue: Ongnyeon International Shooting Range
- Dates: 25 September 2014
- Competitors: 18 from 6 nations

Medalists
gold medal	Zhai Yujia	China
silver medal	Jo Yong-chol	North Korea
bronze medal	Bakhtiyar Ibrayev	Kazakhstan

The men's 10 metre running target competition at the 2014 Asian Games in Incheon, South Korea was held on 25 September at the Ongnyeon International Shooting Range.

== Schedule ==
All times are Korea Standard Time (UTC+09:00)

Date	Time	Event
Thursday, 25 September 2014	09:00	Qualification
Thursday, 25 September 2014	14:30	Semifinals
Thursday, 25 September 2014	14:30	Finals

== Records ==
Prior to this competition, the existing world, Asian and Games records were as follows.

World Record	Manfred Kurzer (GER)	590	Athens, Greece	19 August 2004
Asian Record	Zhai Yujia (CHN)	590	Guangzhou, China	16 November 2010
Games Record	Zhai Yujia (CHN)	590	Guangzhou, China	16 November 2010

== Results ==
=== Qualification ===
Rank	Athlete	Slow			Fast			Total	Xs	S-off	Notes
Rank	Athlete	1	2	3	1	2	3	Total	Xs	S-off	Notes
1	Pak Myong-won (PRK)	99	99	91	97	98	98	582	17		
2	Zhai Yujia (CHN)	96	96	98	96	97	96	579	17		
3	Bakhtiyar Ibrayev (KAZ)	94	97	98	94	93	98	574	17		
4	Jo Yong-chol (PRK)	98	93	98	98	88	96	571	10		
5	Zhang Jie (CHN)	100	98	94	92	96	90	570	14		
6	Jeong You-jin (KOR)	98	94	96	93	96	93	570	10		
7	Trần Hoàng Vũ (VIE)	95	96	97	92	92	97	569	14		
8	Gan Yu (CHN)	96	98	95	96	91	92	568	15		
9	Ngô Hữu Vượng (VIE)	92	96	99	93	90	95	565	8		
10	Cho Se-jong (KOR)	94	95	95	94	86	93	557	11		
11	Andrey Gurov (KAZ)	94	95	93	86	95	93	556	13		
12	Rassim Mologly (KAZ)	95	92	92	92	89	94	554	8		
13	Kim Ji-song (PRK)	97	93	94	92	92	84	552	12		
14	Khalid Al-Kuwari (QAT)	92	89	94	92	96	87	550	5		
15	Kwak Yong-bin (KOR)	97	93	94	83	89	92	548	16		
16	Mohammed Amin Sobhi (QAT)	92	93	94	94	91	84	548	8		
17	Đỗ Đức Hùng (VIE)	96	96	91	94	89	81	547	8		
18	Mohammed Abouteama (QAT)	90	95	90	89	89	89	542	10		

=== Knockout round ===
Semifinals
1	Pak Myong-won (PRK)	5
4	Jo Yong-chol (PRK)	7
2	Zhai Yujia (CHN)	7
3	Bakhtiyar Ibrayev (KAZ)	5

Gold medal match
4	Jo Yong-chol (PRK)	4
2	Zhai Yujia (CHN)	6
Bronze medal match
1	Pak Myong-won (PRK)	5
3	Bakhtiyar Ibrayev (KAZ)	7

==== Semifinals ====
Athlete	Score	1	2	3	4	5	6	7	8	9	10	11	12	13
Jo Yong-chol (PRK)	7	8.4	10.2	10.6	10.1	7.9	10.1	10.0	9.7	8.2	8.2	10.7	10.5	
Pak Myong-won (PRK)	5	9.5	9.3	10.5	9.7	10.4	8.2	10.1	9.5	10.0	10.7	8.0	9.3	
Zhai Yujia (CHN)	7	8.3	10.1	10.5	8.8	10.8	9.6	9.7	9.7	9.9	10.2	10.2	10.2	9.3
Bakhtiyar Ibrayev (KAZ)	5	10.8	10.1	9.5	10.6	6.1	8.7	10.5	10.0	7.6	10.8	9.9	9.2	8.8

==== Bronze medal match ====
Athlete	Score	1	2	3	4	5	6	7	8	9	10	11	12	13
Bakhtiyar Ibrayev (KAZ)	7	9.2	10.2	10.0	10.2	10.1	8.8	10.1	9.0	10.7	10.2	9.5	10.6	10.5
Pak Myong-won (PRK)	5	10.0	8.1	10.7	9.3	9.2	9.9	10.1	8.6	7.7	10.3	10.5	7.8	8.2

==== Gold medal match ====
Athlete	Score	1	2	3	4	5	6	7	8	9	10	11
Zhai Yujia (CHN)	6	9.4	9.6	10.1	9.5	10.6	10.3	10.3	9.2	7.3	9.2	10.6
Jo Yong-chol (PRK)	4	9.4	10.5	9.5	10.2	10.5	8.4	9.1	10.3	10.6	7.7	10.1
