= Shooting at the 2010 Asian Games – Men's 10 metre running target mixed team =

Men's 10 metre running target mixed team at the 2010 Asian Games
- Venue: Aoti Shooting Range
- Dates: 17 November 2010
- Competitors: 18 from 6 nations

Medalists
gold medal	North Korea; Jo Yong-chol, Kim Ji-song, Pak Myong-won
silver medal	China; Gan Lin, Yang Ling, Zhai Yujia
bronze medal	South Korea; Cho Se-jong, Hwang Young-do, Jeong You-jin

The men's 10 metre running target mixed team competition at the 2010 Asian Games in Guangzhou, China was held on 17 November at the Aoti Shooting Range.

== Schedule ==
All times are China Standard Time (UTC+08:00)

Date	Time	Event
Wednesday, 17 November 2010	09:00	Final

== Records ==
Prior to this competition, the existing world, Asian and Games records were as follows.

World Record	Russia	1158	Thessaloniki, Greece	22 March 2002
Asian Record	China	1145	Lahti, Finland	6 July 2002
Games Record	Kazakhstan	1130	Doha, Qatar	6 December 2006

== Results ==
Rank	Team	Stage 1		Stage 2		Total	Xs	Notes
Rank	Team	1	2	1	2	Total	Xs	Notes
1st place, gold medalist(s)	North Korea (PRK)	290	282	289	280	1141	32	GR
	Jo Yong-chol	93	97	96	94	380	13	
	Kim Ji-song	97	90	97	93	377	6	
	Pak Myong-won	100	95	96	93	384	13	
2nd place, silver medalist(s)	China (CHN)	285	284	281	285	1135	27	
	Gan Lin	93	96	96	96	381	8	
	Yang Ling	96	90	93	94	373	7	
	Zhai Yujia	96	98	92	95	381	12	
3rd place, bronze medalist(s)	South Korea (KOR)	285	277	282	277	1121	25	
	Cho Se-jong	96	93	93	89	371	11	
	Hwang Young-do	94	89	95	93	371	7	
	Jeong You-jin	95	95	94	95	379	7	
4	Vietnam (VIE)	277	277	279	284	1117	18	
	Đỗ Đức Hùng	95	87	94	93	369	7	
	Ngô Hữu Vượng	92	96	94	98	380	7	
	Trần Hoàng Vũ	90	94	91	93	368	4	
5	Kazakhstan (KAZ)	278	280	280	275	1113	24	
	Andrey Gurov	92	91	95	96	374	9	
	Bakhtiyar Ibrayev	89	98	87	91	365	9	
	Rassim Mologly	97	91	98	88	374	6	
6	Qatar (QAT)	277	273	279	272	1101	17	
	Mohammed Abouteama	92	91	96	87	366	4	
	Khalid Al-Kuwari	91	93	95	94	373	8	
	Mohammed Amin Sobhi	94	89	88	91	362	5	
