= Shooting at the 2010 Asian Games – Men's 10 metre running target team =

Men's 10 metre running target team at the 2010 Asian Games
- Venue: Aoti Shooting Range
- Dates: 16 November 2010
- Competitors: 18 from 6 nations

Medalists
gold medal	China; Gan Lin, Yang Ling, Zhai Yujia
silver medal	North Korea; Jo Yong-chol, Kim Ji-song, Pak Myong-won
bronze medal	Kazakhstan; Andrey Gurov, Bakhtiyar Ibrayev, Rassim Mologly

The men's 10 metre running target team competition at the 2010 Asian Games in Guangzhou, China was held on 16 November at the Aoti Shooting Range.

== Schedule ==
All times are China Standard Time (UTC+08:00)

Date	Time	Event
Tuesday, 16 November 2010	09:00	Slow
Tuesday, 16 November 2010	12:00	Fast

== Records ==
Prior to this competition, the existing world, Asian and Games records were as follows.

World Record	Germany	1733	Lahti, Finland	5 July 2002
Asian Record	China	1734	Kuala Lumpur, Malaysia	16 February 2004
Games Record	China	1720	Busan, South Korea	4 October 2002

== Results ==
Rank	Team	Slow			Fast			Total	Xs	Notes
Rank	Team	1	2	3	1	2	3	Total	Xs	Notes
1st place, gold medalist(s)	China (CHN)	284	282	290	285	291	286	1718	43	
	Gan Lin	95	97	94	92	97	94	569	12	
	Yang Ling	92	87	96	94	96	94	559	14	
	Zhai Yujia	97	98	100	99	98	98	590	17	
2nd place, silver medalist(s)	North Korea (PRK)	281	288	289	274	277	289	1698	35	
	Jo Yong-chol	91	99	98	94	94	96	572	19	
	Kim Ji-song	95	91	96	85	94	97	558	10	
	Pak Myong-won	95	98	95	95	89	96	568	6	
3rd place, bronze medalist(s)	Kazakhstan (KAZ)	284	286	288	278	275	280	1691	35	
	Andrey Gurov	92	98	99	94	93	93	569	11	
	Bakhtiyar Ibrayev	97	92	93	88	94	92	556	9	
	Rassim Mologly	95	96	96	96	88	95	566	15	
4	South Korea (KOR)	274	285	288	279	272	278	1676	36	
	Cho Se-jong	88	94	96	93	87	91	549	10	
	Hwang Young-do	92	94	93	91	94	91	555	8	
	Jeong You-jin	94	97	99	95	91	96	572	18	
5	Vietnam (VIE)	282	282	287	267	275	279	1672	31	
	Ngô Hữu Vượng	97	95	95	90	93	96	566	14	
	Nguyễn Văn Tùng	93	92	96	87	90	94	552	7	
	Trần Hoàng Vũ	92	95	96	90	92	89	554	10	
6	Qatar (QAT)	279	271	280	266	267	276	1639	25	
	Mohammed Abouteama	92	93	90	86	90	95	546	8	
	Khalid Al-Kuwari	91	85	96	94	91	91	548	9	
	Mohammed Amin Sobhi	96	93	94	86	86	90	545	8	
