= Shooting at the 2014 Asian Games – Men's 10 metre running target mixed team =

Men's 10 metre running target mixed team at the 2014 Asian Games
- Venue: Ongnyeon International Shooting Range
- Dates: 27 September 2014
- Competitors: 18 from 6 nations

Medalists
gold medal	China; Xie Durun, Zhai Yujia, Zhang Jie
silver medal	North Korea; Jo Yong-chol, Kim Ji-song, Pak Myong-won
bronze medal	Vietnam; Đỗ Đức Hùng, Ngô Hữu Vượng, Trần Hoàng Vũ

The men's 10 metre running target mixed team competition at the 2014 Asian Games in Incheon, South Korea was held on 27 September at the Ongnyeon International Shooting Range.

== Schedule ==
All times are Korea Standard Time (UTC+09:00)

Date	Time	Event
Saturday, 27 September 2014	09:00	Final

== Records ==
Prior to this competition, the existing world, Asian and Games records were as follows.

World Record	Russia	1158	Thessaloniki, Greece	22 March 2002
Asian Record	China	1145	Lahti, Finland	6 July 2002
Games Record	North Korea	1141	Guangzhou, China	17 November 2010

== Results ==
Rank	Team	Stage 1		Stage 2		Total	Xs	Notes
Rank	Team	1	2	1	2	Total	Xs	Notes
1st place, gold medalist(s)	China (CHN)	282	285	287	285	1139	32	
	Xie Durun	94	93	95	96	378	7	
	Zhai Yujia	94	96	95	98	383	15	
	Zhang Jie	94	96	97	91	378	10	
2nd place, silver medalist(s)	North Korea (PRK)	283	288	285	281	1137	29	
	Jo Yong-chol	91	97	94	93	375	12	
	Kim Ji-song	96	98	95	95	384	9	
	Pak Myong-won	96	93	96	93	378	8	
3rd place, bronze medalist(s)	Vietnam (VIE)	277	280	281	285	1123	23	
	Đỗ Đức Hùng	91	93	91	94	369	8	
	Ngô Hữu Vượng	91	94	96	95	376	7	
	Trần Hoàng Vũ	95	93	94	96	378	8	
4	South Korea (KOR)	283	280	271	282	1116	20	
	Cho Se-jong	94	91	92	94	371	7	
	Hwang Young-do	93	93	87	91	364	7	
	Jeong You-jin	96	96	92	97	381	6	
5	Kazakhstan (KAZ)	279	274	275	274	1102	18	
	Andrey Gurov	94	93	91	88	366	6	
	Bakhtiyar Ibrayev	94	93	90	94	371	6	
	Rassim Mologly	91	88	94	92	365	6	
6	Qatar (QAT)	268	269	278	272	1087	16	
	Mohammed Abouteama	90	90	93	90	363	3	
	Khalid Al-Kuwari	89	88	90	93	360	9	
	Mohammed Amin Sobhi	89	91	95	89	364	4	
