= Shooting at the 2010 Asian Games – Men's 10 metre running target mixed =

Men's 10 metre running target mixed at the 2010 Asian Games
- Venue: Aoti Shooting Range
- Dates: 17 November 2010
- Competitors: 19 from 7 nations

Medalists
gold medal	Pak Myong-won	North Korea
silver medal	Zhai Yujia	China
bronze medal	Gan Lin	China

The men's 10 metre running target mixed competition at the 2010 Asian Games in Guangzhou, China was held on 17 November at the Aoti Shooting Range.

== Schedule ==
All times are China Standard Time (UTC+08:00)

Date	Time	Event
Wednesday, 17 November 2010	09:00	Final

== Records ==
Prior to this competition, the existing world, Asian and Games records were as follows.

World Record	Vladislav Prianishnikov (UKR)	393	Winterthur, Switzerland	26 February 2008
Asian Record	Niu Zhiyuan (CHN)	390	Barcelona, Spain	20 July 1998
Games Record	Gan Lin (CHN)	389	Doha, Qatar	6 December 2006

== Results ==
Rank	Athlete	Stage 1		Stage 2		Total	Xs	S-off	Notes
Rank	Athlete	1	2	1	2	Total	Xs	S-off	Notes
1st place, gold medalist(s)	Pak Myong-won (PRK)	100	95	96	93	384	13		
2nd place, silver medalist(s)	Zhai Yujia (CHN)	96	98	92	95	381	12	20	
3rd place, bronze medalist(s)	Gan Lin (CHN)	93	96	96	96	381	8	19	
4	Jo Yong-chol (PRK)	93	97	96	94	380	13		
5	Ngô Hữu Vượng (VIE)	92	96	94	98	380	7		
6	Jeong You-jin (KOR)	95	95	94	95	379	7		
7	Kim Ji-song (PRK)	97	90	97	93	377	6		
8	Andrey Gurov (KAZ)	92	91	95	96	374	9		
9	Rassim Mologly (KAZ)	97	91	98	88	374	6		
10	Khalid Al-Kuwari (QAT)	91	93	95	94	373	8		
11	Yang Ling (CHN)	96	90	93	94	373	7		
12	Cho Se-jong (KOR)	96	93	93	89	371	11		
13	Hwang Young-do (KOR)	94	89	95	93	371	7		
14	Đỗ Đức Hùng (VIE)	95	87	94	93	369	7		
15	Trần Hoàng Vũ (VIE)	90	94	91	93	368	4		
16	Mohammed Abouteama (QAT)	92	91	96	87	366	4		
17	Bakhtiyar Ibrayev (KAZ)	89	98	87	91	365	9		
18	Mohammed Amin Sobhi (QAT)	94	89	88	91	362	5		
19	Mongkonchai Meechu (THA)	85	95	85	89	354	8		
