= Shooting at the 2014 Asian Games – Men's 10 metre running target team =

Men's 10 metre running target team at the 2014 Asian Games
- Venue: Ongnyeon International Shooting Range
- Dates: 25 September 2014
- Competitors: 18 from 6 nations

Medalists
gold medal	China; Gan Yu, Zhai Yujia, Zhang Jie
silver medal	North Korea; Jo Yong-chol, Kim Ji-song, Pak Myong-won
bronze medal	Kazakhstan; Andrey Gurov, Bakhtiyar Ibrayev, Rassim Mologly

The men's 10 metre running target team competition at the 2014 Asian Games in Incheon, South Korea was held on 25 September at the Ongnyeon International Shooting Range.

== Schedule ==
All times are Korea Standard Time (UTC+09:00)

Date	Time	Event
Thursday, 25 September 2014	09:00	Final

== Records ==
Prior to this competition, the existing world, Asian and Games records were as follows.

World Record	Hungary	1734	Moscow, Russia	5 March 2014
Asian Record	China	1734	Kuala Lumpur, Malaysia	16 February 2004
Games Record	China	1720	Busan, South Korea	4 October 2002

== Results ==
Rank	Team	Slow			Fast			Total	Xs	Notes
Rank	Team	1	2	3	1	2	3	Total	Xs	Notes
1st place, gold medalist(s)	China (CHN)	292	292	287	284	284	278	1717	46	
	Gan Yu	96	98	95	96	91	92	568	15	
	Zhai Yujia	96	96	98	96	97	96	579	17	
	Zhang Jie	100	98	94	92	96	90	570	14	
2nd place, silver medalist(s)	North Korea (PRK)	294	285	283	287	278	278	1705	39	
	Jo Yong-chol	98	93	98	98	88	96	571	10	
	Kim Ji-song	97	93	94	92	92	84	552	12	
	Pak Myong-won	99	99	91	97	98	98	582	17	
3rd place, bronze medalist(s)	Kazakhstan (KAZ)	283	284	283	272	277	285	1684	38	
	Andrey Gurov	94	95	93	86	95	93	556	13	
	Bakhtiyar Ibrayev	94	97	98	94	93	98	574	17	
	Rassim Mologly	95	92	92	92	89	94	554	8	
4	Vietnam (VIE)	283	288	287	279	271	273	1681	30	
	Đỗ Đức Hùng	96	96	91	94	89	81	547	8	
	Ngô Hữu Vượng	92	96	99	93	90	95	565	8	
	Trần Hoàng Vũ	95	96	97	92	92	97	569	14	
5	South Korea (KOR)	289	282	285	270	271	278	1675	37	
	Cho Se-jong	94	95	95	94	86	93	557	11	
	Jeong You-jin	98	94	96	93	96	93	570	10	
	Kwak Yong-bin	97	93	94	83	89	92	548	16	
6	Qatar (QAT)	274	277	278	275	276	260	1640	23	
	Mohammed Abouteama	90	95	90	89	89	89	542	10	
	Khalid Al-Kuwari	92	89	94	92	96	87	550	5	
	Mohammed Amin Sobhi	92	93	94	94	91	84	548	8	
