= Shooting at the 2002 Asian Games – Men's 10 metre running target team =

Men's 10 metre running target team at the 2002 Asian Games
- Venue: Changwon International Shooting Range
- Dates: 3–4 October 2002
- Competitors: 9 from 3 nations

Medalists
gold medal	China; Niu Zhiyuan, Yang Ling, Zeng Guobin
silver medal	South Korea; Cho Se-jong, Her Dae-kyung, Hwang Young-do
bronze medal	Kazakhstan; Sergey Duzev, Andrey Gurov, Rustam Seitov

The men's 10 metre running target team competition at the 2002 Asian Games in Busan, South Korea was held on 3 and 4 October at the Changwon International Shooting Range.

== Schedule ==
All times are Korea Standard Time (UTC+09:00)

Date	Time	Event
Thursday, 3 October 2002	09:00	Slow
Friday, 4 October 2002	09:00	Fast

== Records ==
Prior to this competition, the existing world, Asian and Games records were as follows.

World Record	Germany	1733	Lahti, Finland	5 July 2002
Asian Record	China	1713	Langkawi, Malaysia	28 January 2000
Games Record	China	1707	Beijing, China	30 September 1990

== Results ==
Rank	Team	Slow			Fast			Total	Notes
Rank	Team	1	2	3	1	2	3	Total	Notes
1st place, gold medalist(s)	China (CHN)	286	290	294	290	282	278	1720	AR
	Niu Zhiyuan	95	99	98	98	94	95	579	
	Yang Ling	98	96	97	97	96	91	575	
	Zeng Guobin	93	95	99	95	92	92	566	
2nd place, silver medalist(s)	South Korea (KOR)	287	284	283	266	273	279	1672	
	Cho Se-jong	96	94	93	97	90	90	560	
	Her Dae-kyung	98	99	96	86	98	98	575	
	Hwang Young-do	93	91	94	83	85	91	537	
3rd place, bronze medalist(s)	Kazakhstan (KAZ)	277	276	280	265	271	276	1645	
	Sergey Duzev	94	93	91	89	93	91	551	
	Andrey Gurov	92	95	93	90	92	93	555	
	Rustam Seitov	91	88	96	86	86	92	539	
