= Shooting at the 2018 Asian Games – Men's 10 metre running target mixed =

Men's 10 metre running target mixed at the 2018 Asian Games
- Venue: Jakabaring Shooting Range
- Dates: 25 August 2018
- Competitors: 13 from 7 nations

Medalists
gold medal	Pak Myong-won	North Korea
silver medal	Muhammad Sejahtera Dwi Putra	Indonesia
bronze medal	Gan Yu	China

The men's 10 metre running target mixed competition at the 2018 Asian Games in Palembang, Indonesia was held on 27 September at the Jakabaring International Shooting Range.

== Schedule ==
All times are Western Indonesia Time (UTC+07:00)

Date	Time	Event
Saturday, 25 August 2018	08:30	Final

== Records ==
Prior to this competition, the existing world, Asian and Games records were as follows.

World Record	Vladislav Prianishnikov (UKR)	393	Winterthur, Switzerland	26 February 2008
Asian Record	Niu Zhiyuan (CHN)	390	Barcelona, Spain	20 July 1998
Games Record	Gan Lin (CHN)	389	Doha, Qatar	6 December 2006

== Results ==
Rank	Athlete	Stage 1		Stage 2		Total	Xs	S-off	Notes
Rank	Athlete	1	2	1	2	Total	Xs	S-off	Notes
1st place, gold medalist(s)	Pak Myong-won (PRK)	95	97	97	95	384	5		
2nd place, silver medalist(s)	Muhammad Sejahtera Dwi Putra (INA)	93	97	95	95	380	1		
3rd place, bronze medalist(s)	Gan Yu (CHN)	96	96	91	96	379	6		
4	Kwak Yong-bin (KOR)	95	92	94	96	377	8		
5	Bakhtiyar Ibrayev (KAZ)	93	93	96	95	377	6		
6	Rassim Mologly (KAZ)	92	95	96	92	375	7		
7	Jo Yong-chol (PRK)	93	96	96	90	375	7		
8	Ngô Hữu Vượng (VIE)	95	99	88	92	374	8		
9	Cho Se-jong (KOR)	92	95	91	95	373	5		
10	Xie Durun (CHN)	93	89	90	96	368	6		
11	Trần Hoàng Vũ (VIE)	94	91	94	87	366	4		
12	Mohammed Abouteama (QAT)	88	92	89	93	362	5		
13	Pahriz Nugra Pratama (INA)	87	88	93	92	360	5		
