= 2016 in aquatic sports =

This article lists the in the water and on the water forms of aquatic sports for 2016.

== 2016 Summer Olympics (FINA–Aquatics) ==
- February 19–24: 2016 FINA Diving World Cup in (Brazil) Rio de Janeiro (Olympic Test Event)
  - China won both the gold and overall medal tallies.
- March 2–6: Aquece Rio Synchronized Swimming 2016 in (Brazil) Rio de Janeiro (Olympic Test Event)
  - Duet winners: Spain (Gemma Mengual, Ona Carbonell, Paula Klamburg)
  - Team winners: Ukraine
- April 15–20: Aquece Rio Swimming 2016 (Maria Lenk Trophy) in (Brazil) Rio de Janeiro at the Olympic Aquatics Stadium (Olympic Test Event)
  - For results, click here.
- June 11 & 12: 2016 Marathon Swimming Olympic Games Qualification Tournament in (Portugal) Setúbal
  - Men's winner: (China) ZU Lijun
  - Women's winner: (China) Xin Xin
- August 6–13: Swimming at the 2016 Summer Olympics in (Brazil) Rio de Janeiro at the Olympic Aquatics Stadium
  - The United States won both the gold and overall medal tallies.
- August 7–19: Diving at the 2016 Summer Olympics in (Brazil) Rio de Janeiro at the Maria Lenk Aquatics Center
  - Men's 3m Springboard: (gold) (China) Cao Yuan; (silver) (United Kingdom) Jack Laugher; (bronze) (Germany) Patrick Hausding
  - Women's 3m Springboard: (gold) (China) Shi Tingmao; (silver) (China) He Zi; (bronze) (Italy) Tania Cagnotto
  - Men's 10m Platform: (gold) (China) Chen Aisen; (silver) (Mexico) Germán Sánchez; (bronze) (United States) David Boudia
  - Women's 10m Platform: (gold) (China) Ren Qian; (silver) (China) Si Yajie; (bronze) (Canada) Meaghan Benfeito
  - Men's Synchronized 3m Springboard:
    - (gold) Great Britain (Chris Mears & Jack Laugher)
    - (silver) United States (Sam Dorman & Michael Hixon)
    - (bronze) China (Cao Yuan & Qin Kai)
  - Men's Synchronized 10m Platform:
    - (gold) China (Chen Aisen & Lin Yue)
    - (silver) United States (David Boudia & Steele Johnson)
    - (bronze) Great Britain (Tom Daley & Daniel Goodfellow)
  - Women's Synchronized 3m Springboard:
    - (gold) China (Shi Tingmao & Wu Minxia)
    - (silver) Italy (Tania Cagnotto & Francesca Dallapé)
    - (bronze) Australia (Maddison Keeney & Anabelle Smith)
  - Women's Synchronized 10m Platform:
    - (gold) China (Chen Ruolin & Liu Huixia)
    - (silver) Malaysia (Cheong Jun Hoong & Pandelela Rinong)
    - (bronze) Canada (Meaghan Benfeito & Roseline Filion)
- August 15: Women's 10km marathon swimming in (Brazil) Rio de Janeiro at Fort Copacabana
  - (gold) (Netherlands) Sharon van Rouwendaal; (silver) (Italy) Rachele Bruni; (bronze) (Brazil) Poliana Okimoto
- August 15–20: Synchronized swimming at the 2016 Summer Olympics in (Brazil) Rio de Janeiro at the Maria Lenk Aquatics Center
  - Duet:
  - (gold) Russia (Natalia Ishchenko & Svetlana Romashina)
  - (silver) China (Huang Xuechen & Sun Wenyan)
  - (bronze) Japan (Yukiko Inui & Risako Mitsui)
  - Team: (gold) Russia; (silver) China; (bronze) Japan
- August 16: Men's 10km marathon swimming in (Brazil) Rio de Janeiro at Fort Copacabana
  - (gold) (Netherlands) Ferry Weertman; (silver) (Greece) Spyridon Gianniotis; (bronze) (France) Marc-Antoine Olivier

== 2016 FINA 10 km Marathon Swimming World Cup & World Events ==
- February 6 & 7: World Cup and Event #1 in (Argentina) Carmen de Patagones-Viedma, Río Negro
  - Men's winner: (United States) Alex Meyer
  - Women's winner: (Italy) Rachele Bruni
- February 26 & 27: World Cup and Event #2 in (United Arab Emirates) Abu Dhabi
  - Men's winner: (France) Marc Antoine Olivier
  - Women's winner: (France) Aurélie Muller
- June 18: World Cup and Event #3 in (Hungary) Balatonfüred
  - Men's winner: (Italy) Simone Ruffini
  - Women's winner: (Italy) Rachele Bruni
- July 28: World Cup and Event #4 in (Canada) Lac Saint-Jean
  - Men's winner: (Canada) Philippe Guertin
  - Women's winner: (Canada) Stephanie Horner
- August 13: World Cup and Event #5 in (Canada) Lake Mégantic
  - Men's winner: (Germany) Andreas Waschburger
  - Women's winner: (Italy) Arianna Bridi
- October 9: World Cup and Event #6 in (China) Chun'an County-Hangzhou
  - Men's winner: (Italy) Simone Ruffini
  - Women's winner: (China) Xin Xin
- October 15: World Cup and Event #7 (final) in Hong Kong
  - Men's winner: (Italy) Simone Ruffini
  - Women's winner: (Italy) Rachele Bruni

== 2016 FINA Open Water Swimming Grand Prix ==
- July 30: Grand Prix #1 in (Canada) Lac Saint-Jean
  - Men's winner: (United States) Alex Meyer
  - Women's winner: (Russia) Olga Kozydub
- August 20: Grand Prix #2 in (North Macedonia) Lake Ohrid
  - Men's winner: (North Macedonia) Tomi Stefanovski
  - Women's winner: (Russia) Olga Kozydub
- September 4: Grand Prix #3 (final) in (Italy) Capri, Campania-Naples
  - Men's winner: (North Macedonia) Evgenij Pop Acev
  - Women's winner: (Argentina) Pilar Geijo

== Diving ==
=== 2016 FINA Diving World Series ===
- March 11–13: DWS #1 in Beijing
  - Men's 3m Springboard winner: (China) Cao Yuan
  - Women's 3m Springboard winner: (China) Shi Tingmao
  - Men's 10m Platform winner: (China) Chen Aisen
  - Women's 10m Platform winner: (China) Si Yajie
  - Men's Synchronized 3m Springboard winners: China (Cao Yuan, Qin Kai)
  - Women's Synchronized 3m Springboard winners: China (He Zi, Wang Han)
  - Men's Synchronized 10m Platform winners: China (Lin Yue, Chen Aisen)
  - Women's Synchronized 10m Platform winners: China (Liu Huixia, Si Yajie)
  - Mixed Synchronized 3m Springboard winners: China (Wang Han, Yang Hao)
  - Mixed Synchronized 10m Platform winners: China (Tai Xiaohu, Chang Yani)
- March 17–19: DWS #2 in (United Arab Emirates) Dubai
  - Men's 3m Springboard winner: (China) Cao Yuan
  - Women's 3m Springboard winner: (China) Shi Tingmao
  - Men's 10m Platform winner: (China) Yang Hao
  - Women's 10m Platform winner: (China) Liu Huixia
  - Men's Synchronized 3m Springboard winners: China (Cao Yuan, Qin Kai)
  - Women's Synchronized 3m Springboard winners: China (He Zi, Wang Han)
  - Men's Synchronized 10m Platform winners: China (Lin Yue, Chen Aisen)
  - Women's Synchronized 10m Platform winners: China (Liu Huixia, Si Yajie)
  - Mixed Synchronized 3m Springboard winners: China (Wang Han, Yang Hao)
  - Mixed Synchronized 10m Platform winners: China (Tai Xiaohu, Chang Yani)
- April 15–17: DWS #3 in Windsor, Ontario
  - Men's 3m Springboard winner: (China) Cao Yuan
  - Women's 3m Springboard winner: (China) He Zi
  - Men's 10m Platform winner: (China) Chen Aisen
  - Women's 10m Platform winner: (China) Ren Qian
  - Men's Synchronized 3m Springboard winners: China (Qin Kai, Cao Yuan)
  - Women's Synchronized 3m Springboard winners: China (He Zi, Wang Han)
  - Men's Synchronized 10m Platform winners: China (Lin Yue, Chen Aisen)
  - Women's Synchronized 10m Platform winners: China (Chen Ruolin, Liu Huixia)
  - Mixed Synchronized 3m Springboard winners: Canada (Jennifer Abel, François Imbeau-Dulac)
  - Mixed Synchronized 10m Platform winners: China (Tai Xiaohu, Chang Yani)
- April 22–24: DWS #4 (final) in Kazan
  - Men's 3m Springboard winner: (China) Cao Yuan
  - Women's 3m Springboard winner: (China) He Zi
  - Men's 10m Platform winner: (China) Chen Aisen
  - Women's 10m Platform winner: (China) Ren Qian
  - Men's Synchronized 3m Springboard winners: Russia (Ilya Zakharov, Evgeny Kuznetsov)
  - Women's Synchronized 3m Springboard winners: China (He Zi, Wang Han)
  - Men's Synchronized 10m Platform winners: China (Lin Yue, Chen Aisen)
  - Women's Synchronized 10m Platform winners: China (Chen Ruolin, Liu Huixia)
  - Mixed Synchronized 3m Springboard winners: China (Wang Han, Yang Hao)
  - Mixed Synchronized 10m Platform winners: China (Tai Xiaohu, Chang Yani)

=== 2016 FINA Diving Grand Prix ===
- January 15–17: DGP #1 in (Spain) Madrid
  - Men's 3m Springboard winner: (Austria) Constantin Blaha
  - Women's 3m Springboard winner: (China) XU Zhihuan
  - Men's 10m Platform winner: (China) Yang Hao
  - Women's 10m Platform winner: (China) XIA Bingqing
  - Men's Synchronized 3m Springboard winners: (China) Zhao Dong / Li Jiawei
  - Women's Synchronized 3m Springboard winners: (China) XU Zhihuan / Wang Han
  - Men's Synchronized 10m Platform winners: (China) JIE Lianjun / Yang Hao
  - Women's Synchronized 10m Platform winners: (China) XIA Bingqing / XIA Yujie
- January 29–31: DGP #2 in (Germany) Rostock
  - Men's 3m Springboard winner: (Germany) Patrick Hausding
  - Women's 3m Springboard winner: (China) HE Xiaojie
  - Men's 10m Platform winner: (China) Yang Jian
  - Women's 10m Platform winner: (China) DING Yaying
  - Men's Synchronized 3m Springboard winners: (Canada) Philippe Gagné / François Imbeau-Dulac
  - Women's Synchronized 3m Springboard winners: (China) CHEN Jiayu / HE Xiaojie
  - Men's Synchronized 10m Platform winners: (China) XU Zewei / TAI Xiaohu
  - Women's Synchronized 10m Platform winners: (China) DING Yaying / SUO Miya
- March 31 – April 3: DGP #3 in San Juan, Puerto Rico
  - Men's 3m Springboard winner: (France) Matthieu Rosset
  - Women's 3m Springboard winner: (China) WU Chunting
  - Men's 10m Platform winner: (China) LIAN Junjie
  - Women's 10m Platform winner: (United States) Samantha Bromberg
  - Men's Synchronized 3m Springboard winners: (China) PENG Jianfeng / SUN Zhiyi
  - Women's Synchronized 3m Springboard winners: (China) WU Chunting / XU Zhihuan
  - Men's Synchronized 10m Platform winners: (China) HUANG Bowen / XU Zewei
  - Women's Synchronized 10m Platform winners: (China) SUO Miya / LI Jinming
  - Mixed Synchronized 3m Springboard winners: (China) HUANG Bowen / WU Chunting
- April 7–10: DGP #4 in (Canada) Gatineau
  - Men's 3m Springboard winner: (France) Matthieu Rosset
  - Women's 3m Springboard winner: (China) WU Chunting
  - Men's 10m Platform winner: (Canada) Vincent Riendeau
  - Women's 10m Platform winner: (Canada) Roseline Filion
  - Men's Synchronized 3m Springboard winners: (Canada) Philippe Gagné / François Imbeau-Dulac
  - Women's Synchronized 3m Springboard winners: (China) WU Chunting / XU Zhihuan
  - Men's Synchronized 10m Platform winners: (China) XU Zewei / HUANG Bowen
  - Women's Synchronized 10m Platform winners: (Canada) Meaghan Benfeito / Roseline Filion
  - Mixed Synchronized 3m Springboard winners: (China) WU Chunting / HUANG Bowen
  - Mixed Synchronized 10m Platform winners: (China) SUO Miya / LIAN Junjie
- July 15–17: DGP #5 in (Italy) Bolzano
  - Men's 3m Springboard winner: (Switzerland) Guillaume Dutoit
  - Women's 3m Springboard winner: (Italy) Tania Cagnotto
  - Men's 10m Platform winner: (China) Yang Hao
  - Women's 10m Platform winner: (Japan) Minami Itahashi
  - Men's Synchronized 3m Springboard winners: (Germany) Patrick Hausding / Stephan Feck
  - Women's Synchronized 3m Springboard winners: (Italy) Tania Cagnotto / Francesca Dallapé
  - Men's Synchronized 10m Platform winners: (China) XU Zewei / Yang Hao
  - Women's Synchronized 10m Platform winners: (Japan) Nana Sasaki / Matsuri Arai
  - Mixed Synchronized 3m Springboard winners: (Colombia) Sebastián Villa / Diana Pineda
  - Mixed Synchronized 10m Platform winners: (United States) Zachary Cooper / Tarrin Gilliland
- October 21–23: DGP #6 in (Malaysia) Kuching
  - Men's 3m Springboard winner: (China) Xie Siyi
  - Women's 3m Springboard winner: (Malaysia) Ng Yan Yee
  - Men's 10m Platform winner: (China) Yang Hao
  - Women's 10m Platform winner: (China) LIAN Jie
  - Men's Synchronized 3m Springboard winners: (China) Xie Siyi / HUANG Bowen
  - Women's Synchronized 3m Springboard winners: (China) XU Zhihuan / Wang Han
  - Men's Synchronized 10m Platform winners: (China) Yang Hao / XU Zewei
  - Women's Synchronized 10m Platform winners: (China) XIA Bingqing / XIA Yujie
- October 27–30: DGP #7 in (Australia) Gold Coast, Queensland
  - Men's 3m Springboard winner: (China) PENG Jianfeng
  - Women's 3m Springboard winner: (Australia) Georgia Sheehan
  - Men's 10m Platform winner: (China) Yang Jian
  - Women's 10m Platform winner: (China) LIAN Jie
  - Men's Synchronized 3m Springboard winners: (China) Xie Siyi / HUANG Bowen
  - Women's Synchronized 3m Springboard winners: (China) XU Zhihuan / Wang Han
  - Men's Synchronized 10m Platform winners: (China) Yang Hao / XU Zewei (default)
  - Women's Synchronized 10m Platform winners: (China) XIA Bingqing / XIA Yujie
- November 4–6: DGP #8 (final) in Singapore
  - Men's 3m Springboard winner: (China) CHEN Linhai
  - Women's 3m Springboard winner: (Japan) Hazuki Miyamoto
  - Men's 10m Platform winner: (Japan) Nishida Reo
  - Women's 10m Platform winner: (Japan) Nana Sasaki
  - Men's Synchronized 3m Springboard winners: (China) CHEN Linhai / LI Linwei
  - Women's Synchronized 10m Platform winners: (Japan) Matsuri Arai / Nana Sasaki
  - Mixed Synchronized 3m Springboard winners: (Japan) Hazuki Miyamoto / Nishida Reo
  - Mixed Synchronized 10m Platform winners: (Ukraine) Yevhen Naumenko / Valeriia Liulko (default)

=== 2016 Red Bull Cliff Diving World Series ===
- June 4: #1 in (United States) Fort Worth, Texas
  - Winners: (Mexico) Jonathan Paredes (m) / (Australia) Rhiannan Iffland (f)
- June 18: #2 in (Denmark) Copenhagen
  - Winner: (United Kingdom) Gary Hunt
- July 9: #3 in (Portugal) São Miguel Island
  - Winners: (United Kingdom) Gary Hunt (m) / (Australia) Rhiannan Iffland (f)
- July 23: #4 in (France) La Rochelle
  - Winner: (United Kingdom) Gary Hunt (m)
- August 28: #5 in (Italy) Polignano a Mare
  - Winners: (Russia) Artem Silchenko (m) / (Canada) Lysanne Richard (f)
- September 11: #6 in (United Kingdom) Pembrokeshire
  - Winners: (Czech Republic) Michal Navrátil (m) / (Australia) Rhiannan Iffland (f)
- September 24: #7 in (Bosnia and Herzegovina) Mostar
  - Winners: (Czech Republic) Michal Navrátil (m) / (Canada) Lysanne Richard (f)
- October 16: #8 in (Japan) Shirahama, Wakayama
  - Winners: (Mexico) Sergio Guzman (m) / (Australia) Rhiannan Iffland (f)
- October 28: #9 in (United Arab Emirates) Dubai
  - Winners: (United States) Andy Jones (m) / (Australia) Rhiannan Iffland (f)

=== Other diving events ===
- February 27–29: 2016 FINA High Diving World Cup in (United Arab Emirates) Abu Dhabi
  - Men's (27 metres) winner: (United Kingdom) Gary Hunt
  - Women's (20 metres) winner: (Canada) Lysanne Richard
- June 28 – July 3: 2016 European Junior Diving Championships in (Croatia) Rijeka
  - Boys' Platform winner: (United Kingdom) Matthew Dixon
  - Boys' Synchro winners: (Germany) Lou Massenberg / Patrick Kreisel
  - Boys' 1 m winner: (Italy) Francesco Porco
  - Boys' 3 m winner: (Germany) Patrick Kreisel
  - Girls' Platform winner: (Germany) Christina Wassen
  - Girls' Synchro winners: (Switzerland) Madeline Coquoz / Michelle Heimberg
  - Girls' 1 m winner: (Poland) Kaja Skrzek
  - Girls' 3 m winner: (Poland) Kaja Skrzek
- November 28 – December 4: 2016 FINA World Junior Diving Championships in (Russia) Kazan
  - China won both the gold and overall medal tallies.

== Swimming ==
- July 6–10: 2016 European Junior Swimming Championships in (Hungary) Hódmezővásárhely
  - Russia won the gold medal tally. Russia and Italy won 22 overall medals each.
- December 6–11: 2016 FINA World Swimming Championships (25 m) in (Canada) Windsor, Ontario
  - The United States won both the gold and overall medal tallies.

=== 2016 FINA Swimming World Cup ===
- August 26 & 27: SWC #1 in (France) Paris-Chartres
  - Hungary won the gold medal tally. Australia won the overall medal tally.
- August 30 & 31: SWC #2 in (Germany) Berlin
  - Hungary won the gold medal tally. Australia won the overall medal tally.
- September 3 & 4: SWC #3 in Moscow
  - Russia and Hungary won 8 gold medals each. Russia won the overall medal tally.
- September 30 & October 1: SWC #4 in Beijing
  - China won both the gold and overall medal tallies.
- October 4 & 5: SWC #5 in (United Arab Emirates) Dubai
  - Hungary won both the gold and overall medal tallies.
- October 8 & 9: SWC #6 in (Qatar) Doha
  - Hungary won both the gold and overall medal tallies.
- October 21 & 22: SWC #7 in Singapore
  - Hungary won both the gold and overall medal tallies.
- October 25 & 26: SWC #8 in Tokyo
  - Hungary won the gold medal tally. Japan won the overall medal tally.
- October 29 & 30: SWC #9 (final) in Hong Kong
  - Hungary won both the gold and overall medal tallies.

=== Synchronised swimming ===
- June 22–26: 2016 European Junior Synchronised Swimming Championships in (Croatia) Rijeka
  - Solo winner: (Russia) Veronika Kalinina
  - Duet winners: Russia (Daria Kulagina, Veronika Kalinina)
  - Figures winner: (Russia) Varvara Subbotina
  - Team winners: Russia
  - Combination winners: Russia
- July 9–13: 2016 FINA World Junior Synchronized Swimming Championships in Kazan
  - Solo winner: (Russia) Varvara Subbotina
  - Duet winners: Russia (Veronika Kalinina, Daria Kulagina, Varvara Subbotina)
  - Team winners: Russia
  - Combination winners: Russia

== LEN aquatic events ==
- May 9–22: 2016 European Aquatics Championships in (United Kingdom) London
  - Great Britain, Hungary, and Russia won ten gold medals each. Great Britain won the overall medal tally.
- July 10–14: 2016 European Open Water Swimming Championships in (Netherlands) Hoorn
  - Italy won both the gold and overall medal tallies.
- September 9–11: 2016 European Junior Open Water Swimming Championships in Piombino
  - Italy, Hungary, and France won 2 gold medals each. Italy won the overall medal tally.

== Canoeing ==
- February 12 – September 11: 2016 ICF Events Calendar

=== 2016 Summer Olympics (ICF) ===
- May 18 & 19: 2016 Canoe Sprint European Continental Olympic Qualifier in (Germany) Duisburg
  - Spain won both the gold and overall medal tallies.
- August 7–11: 2016 Summer Olympics in (Brazil) Rio de Janeiro at the Olympic Whitewater Stadium (Whitewater slalom)
  - Men's C1: (gold) (France) Denis Gargaud Chanut; (silver) (Slovakia) Matej Beňuš; (bronze) (Japan) Takuya Haneda
  - Men's C2:
  - (gold) Slovakia (Ladislav Škantár & Peter Škantár)
  - (silver) Great Britain (David Florence & Richard Hounslow)
  - (bronze) France (Gauthier Klauss & Matthieu Péché)
  - Men's K1: (gold) (United Kingdom) Joe Clarke; (silver) (Slovenia) Peter Kauzer; (bronze) (Czech Republic) Jiří Prskavec
  - Women's K1: (gold) (Spain) Maialen Chourraut; (silver) (New Zealand) Luuka Jones; (bronze) (Australia) Jessica Fox
- August 15–20: 2016 Summer Olympics in Rio de Janeiro at the Rodrigo de Freitas Lagoon (Canoe sprint)
  - Men
  - Men's C1 200m: (gold) (Ukraine) Yuriy Cheban; (silver) (Azerbaijan) Valentin Demyanenko; (bronze) (Brazil) Isaquias Queiroz
  - Men's C1 1,000m: (gold) (Germany) Sebastian Brendel; (silver) (Brazil) Isaquias Queiroz; (bronze) (Moldova) Serghei Tarnovschi
  - Men's C2 1,000m:
  - (gold) Germany (Sebastian Brendel & Jan Vandrey)
  - (silver) Brazil (Erlon Silva & Isaquias Queiroz)
  - (bronze) Ukraine (Dmytro Ianchuk & Taras Mishchuk)
  - Men's K1 200m: (gold) (United Kingdom) Liam Heath; (silver) (France) Maxime Beaumont; (bronze) (Spain) Saúl Craviotto; (bronze) (Germany) Ronald Rauhe
  - Men's K1 1,000m: (gold) (Spain) Marcus Walz; (silver) (Czech Republic) Josef Dostál; (bronze) (Russia) Roman Anoshkin
  - Men's K2 200m:
  - (gold) Spain (Saúl Craviotto & Cristian Toro)
  - (silver) Great Britain (Liam Heath & Jon Schofield
  - (bronze) Lithuania (Aurimas Lankas & Edvinas Ramanauskas
  - Men's K2 1,000m:
  - (gold) Germany (Max Rendschmidt & Marcus Gross)
  - (silver) Serbia (Marko Tomićević & Milenko Zorić)
  - (bronze) Australia (Ken Wallace & Lachlan Tame)
  - Men's K4 1,000m: (gold) Germany; (silver) Slovakia; (bronze) Czech Republic
  - Women
  - Women's K1 200m: (gold) (New Zealand) Lisa Carrington; (silver) (Poland) Marta Walczykiewicz; (bronze) (Azerbaijan) Inna Osypenko-Radomska
  - Women's K1 500m: (gold) (Hungary) Danuta Kozák; (silver) (Denmark) Emma Jørgensen; (bronze) (New Zealand) Lisa Carrington
  - Women's K2 500m:
  - (gold) Hungary (Gabriella Szabó & Danuta Kozák)
  - (silver) Germany (Franziska Weber & Tina Dietze)
  - (bronze) Poland (Karolina Naja & Beata Mikołajczyk)
  - Women's K4 500m: (gold) Hungary; (silver) Germany; (bronze) Belarus

=== Canoe sprint (flatwater) ===
- February 12 – July 31: 2016 ICF Events Calendar for Canoe Sprint

==== Continental and world canoe sprint championships ====
- February 12–14: 2016 Oceania Canoe Sprint Championships in Adelaide
  - Australia won both the gold and overall medal tallies.
- April 1–4: 2016 African Canoe Sprint Championships in Durban
  - South Africa won the gold medal tally. Tunisia won the overall medal tally.
- May 19–22: 2016 Pan American Canoe Sprint Championships in (United States) Gainesville, Georgia
  - Senior: Canada won both the gold and overall medal tallies.
  - Junior: Brazil won the gold medal tally. Argentina and Canada won 10 overall medals each.
- June 7–9: 2016 World University Canoe Sprint Championships in (Portugal) Montemor-o-Velho
  - Poland won both the gold and overall medal tallies.
- June 24–26: 2016 Canoe Sprint European Championships in Moscow
  - Hungary and Russia won 5 gold medals each. Hungary won the overall medal tally.
- July 28–31: 2016 ICF Junior and U23 Canoe Sprint World Championships in Minsk
  - Junior: Hungary, Belarus, and Russia won 5 gold medals each. Hungary won the overall medal tally.
  - U23: Hungary won both the gold and overall medal tallies.

==== 2016 Canoe Sprint World Cup ====
- May 20–22: CSF World Cup #1 in Duisburg
  - Belarus, Germany, and Ukraine won 3 gold medals each. Belarus won the overall medal tally.
- May 27–29: CSF World Cup #2 in (Czech Republic) Račice (Litoměřice District)
  - Germany won both the gold and overall medal tallies.
- June 3–5: CSF World Cup #3 (final) in (Portugal) Montemor-o-Velho
  - Poland won both the gold and overall medal tallies.

=== Whitewater slalom (canoe) ===
- February 19 – September 11: 2016 ICF Events Calendar for Canoe Slalom

==== Continental and world whitewater slalom championships ====
- February 19–21: 2016 Oceania Canoe Slalom Championships in (Australia) Penrith
  - Men's C1 winner: (Slovakia) Matej Beňuš
  - Men's C2 winners: Germany (Franz Anton, Jan Benzien)
  - Men's K1 winner: (Czech Republic) Vavřinec Hradilek
  - Women's C1 winner: (Australia) Jessica Fox
  - Women's K1 winner: (Slovakia) Jana Dukátová
- April 23 & 24: 2016 Asian Canoe Slalom Championships in Toyama
  - Men's C1 winner: (China) SHU Jianming
  - Men's C2 winners: Japan (Shota Sasaki, Tsubasa Sasaki)
  - Men's K1 winner: (China) TAN Ya
  - Women's C1 winner: (Chinese Taipei) Chen Wei-han
  - Women's K1 winner: (China) LI Lu
  - Men's C1 team winners: China (WANG Sheng, SHU Jianming, CHEN Fangjia)
  - Men's C2 team winners: Uzbekistan
  - Men's K1 team winners: Japan (Kazuya Adachi, Tsubasa Sasaki, Taku Yoshida)
  - Women's C1 team winners: Kazakhstan (Xeniya Kondratenko, Kamilla Safina, Yekaterina Smirnova)
  - Women's K1 team winners: Japan (Yuriko Takeshita, Haruka Okazaki, Ren Mishima)
- May 13–15: 2016 European Canoe Slalom Championships in Liptovský Mikuláš
  - Men's C1 winner: (Slovakia) Alexander Slafkovský
  - Women's C1 winner: (Spain) Nuria Vilarrubla
  - Men's C2 winners: Slovakia (Tomáš Kučera, Ján Bátik)
  - Men's K1 winner: (Czech Republic) Jiří Prskavec
  - Women's K1 winner: (Germany) Melanie Pfeifer
  - Men's C1 team winners: Slovakia
  - Women's C1 team winners: Great Britain
  - Men's C2 team winners: Slovakia
  - Men's K1 team winners: Czech Republic
  - Women's K1 team winners: Great Britain
- July 12–17: 2016 ICF Junior and U23 Canoe Slalom World Championships in (Poland) Kraków
- Junior
  - Men's Junior C1 winner: (Slovakia) Marko Mirgorodsky
  - Men's Junior C2 winners: Czech Republic (Albert Kaspar, Vojtech Mruzek)
  - Men's Junior K1 winner: (Ukraine) Ruslan Pestov
  - Men's Junior Team C1 winners: Germany (Gregor Kreul, Lennard Tuchscherer)
  - Men's Junior Team C2 winners: Czech Republic
  - Men's Junior Team K1 winners: France (Thomas Durand, Paul Cornut-Chauvinc)
  - Women's Junior C1 winner: (Czech Republic) Tereza Fišerová
  - Women's Junior K1 winner: (Poland) Klaudia Zwolinska
  - Women's Junior Team C1 winners: Russia (Alsu Minazova, Anastasia Kozyreva)
  - Women's Junior Team K1 winners: Czech Republic (Tereza Fišerová, Karolina Galuskova, Katerina Duskova)
- U23
  - Men's U23 C1 winner: (Germany) Florian Breuer
  - Men's U23 C2 winners: Poland (Filip Brzezinski, Andrzej Brzezinski)
  - Men's U23 K1 winner: (Slovakia) Jakub Grigar
  - Men's U23 Team C1 winners: France (Cedric Joly, Thibault Blaise)
  - Men's U23 Team C2 winners: Russia
  - Men's U23 Team K1 winners: Germany (Stefan Hengst, Leo Bolg)
  - Women's U23 C1 winner: (Australia) Jessica Fox
  - Women's U23 K1 winner: (Australia) Jessica Fox
  - Women's U23 Team C1 winners: Great Britain (Kimberley Woods, Jasmine Royle)
  - Women's U23 Team K1 winners: Germany (Lisa Fritsche, Caroline Trompeter, Selina Jones)

==== 2016 Canoe Slalom World Cup ====
- June 3–5: CS World Cup #1 in (Italy) Ivrea
  - Men's C1 winner: (Czech Republic) Michal Jáně
  - Men's C2 winners: France (Nicola Scianimanico, Hugo Cailhol)
  - Men's K1 winner: (Italy) Giovanni De Gennaro
  - Men's K1 Cross winner: (Czech Republic) Vavřinec Hradilek
  - Women's C1 winner: (Australia) Jessica Fox
  - Women's K1 winner: (Germany) Ricarda Funk
  - Women's K1 Cross winner: (Slovenia) Ajda Novak
- June 10–12: CS World Cup #2 in (Spain) La Seu d'Urgell
  - Men's C1 winner: (Slovakia) Alexander Slafkovský
  - Men's C2 winners: France (Pierre-Antoine Tillard, Edern Le Ruyet)
  - Men's K1 winner: (Czech Republic) Vít Přindiš
  - Men's K1 Cross winner: (Czech Republic) Vít Přindiš
  - Women's C1 winner: (Spain) Núria Vilarrubla
  - Women's K1 winner: (Spain) Maialen Chourraut
  - Women's K1 Cross winner: (Netherlands) Martina Wegman
- June 16–19: CS World Cup #3 in Pau, Pyrénées-Atlantiques
  - Men's C1 winner: (Slovakia) Alexander Slafkovský
  - Men's C2 winners: France (Pierre-Antoine Tillard, Edern Le Ruyet)
  - Men's K1 winner: (Spain) Samuel Hernanz
  - Men's K1 Cross winner: (Czech Republic) Vít Přindiš
  - Women's C1 winner: (United Kingdom) Mallory Franklin
  - Women's K1 winner: (France) Marie-Zélia Lafont
  - Women's K1 Cross winner: (France) Caroline Loir
- September 2–4: CS World Cup #4 in (Czech Republic) Prague
  - Men's C1 winner: (Slovakia) Matej Beňuš
  - Men's C2 winners: Slovakia (Ladislav Škantár, Peter Škantár)
  - Men's K1 winner: (Czech Republic) Jiří Prskavec
  - Men's K1 Cross winner: (Germany) Hannes Aigner
  - Women's C1 winner: (Australia) Jessica Fox
  - Women's K1 winner: (Germany) Ricarda Funk
  - Women's K1 Cross winner: (Czech Republic) Veronika Vojtová
- September 7–11: CS World Cup #5 (final) in (Slovenia) Tacen-Ljubljana
  - Men's C1 winner: (Slovenia) Benjamin Savšek
  - Men's C2 winners: Slovakia (Ladislav Škantár, Peter Škantár)
  - Men's K1 winner: (Slovenia) Peter Kauzer
  - Men's K1 Cross winner: (France) Boris Neveu
  - Women's C1 winner: (United Kingdom) Kimberley Woods
  - Women's K1 winner: (Australia) Jessica Fox
  - Women's K1 Cross winner: (Czech Republic) Amalie Hilgertova

=== Other canoeing events ===
- May 17–19: 2016 ICF Paracanoe World Championships in (Germany) Duisburg
  - Australia won the gold medal tally. Great Britain won the overall medal tally.
- June 1–5: 2016 ICF Wildwater Canoeing World Championships in (Bosnia and Herzegovina) Banja Luka
  - Men's C1 sprint winner: (Czech Republic) Ondrej Rolenc
  - Men's C1 sprint team winners: Czech Republic (Ondrej Rolenc, Antonin Hales, Vladimir Slanina)
  - Men's C2 sprint winners: France (Quentin Dazeur, Stephane Santamaria)
  - Men's C2 sprint team winners: France (T. Debray & L. Lapointe, Q. Dazeur & S. Santamaria, A. Leduc & L. Zouggari)
  - Men's K1 sprint winner: (Belgium) Maxime Richard
  - Men's K1 sprint team winners: Slovenia (Nejc Znidarcic, Anze Urankar, Vid Debeljak)
  - Women's C1 sprint winner: (Czech Republic) Martina Satkova
  - Women's C2 sprint winners: Slovakia (Barobora Kortisova, Katarina Kopunova)
  - Women's K1 sprint winner: (United Kingdom) Hannah Brown
  - Women's K1 sprint team winners: France (Claire Bren, Manon Hostens, Phenicia Dupras)
- August 29 – September 4: 2016 ICF Canoe Polo World Championships in Syracuse, Sicily
  - Men: Italy defeated France, 6–5 in overtime, to win their first ICF Canoe Polo World Championships title.
    - Spain took the bronze medal.
  - Women: New Zealand defeated Germany, 3–2, to win their first ICF Women's Canoe Polo World Championships title.
    - France took the bronze medal.
  - Men U21: Great Britain defeated Germany, 5–4 in overtime, to win their first ICF Men's U21 Canoe Polo World Championships title.
    - Italy took the bronze medal.
  - Women's U21: Germany defeated Poland, 2–1 in overtime, to win their third consecutive ICF Women's U21 Canoe Polo World Championships title.
    - New Zealand took the bronze medal.
- September 8–11: 2016 ICF Dragon Boat World Championships in Moscow
  - Russia won both the gold and overall medal tallies.
- September 16–18: 2016 ICF Canoe Marathon World Championships in (Germany) Brandenburg an der Havel
  - Men's C1 26.2 km: (Hungary) Márton Kover
  - Men's C2 26.2 km: Hungary (Márton Kover, Ádám Docze)
  - Men's K1 29.8 km: (South Africa) Hank McGregor
  - Men's K2 29.8 km: South Africa (Hank McGregor, Jasper Mocke)
  - Men's U23 C1 22.6 km: (Hungary) Bence Balázs Dori
  - Men's U23 K1 26.2 km: (Hungary) Ádám Petro
  - Women's C1 19 km: (Hungary) Zsanett Lakatos
  - Women's K1 26.2 km: (Hungary) Renáta Csay
  - Women's K2 26.2 km: Hungary (Renáta Csay, Alexandra Bara)
  - Women's U23 K1 22.6 km: (Hungary) Vanda Kiszli

== Rowing ==
- January 16 – November 13: 2016 FISA Events Calendar

=== 2016 Summer Olympics (FISA) ===
- August 6–13: 2016 Summer Olympics in (Brazil) Rio de Janeiro at the Rodrigo de Freitas Lagoon
  - Great Britain won both the gold and overall medal tallies.

=== International rowing championships ===
- January 16: 2016 European Rowing Indoor Championships in Győr
  - Poland won the gold medal tally. Poland, Austria, and Hungary won 6 overall medals each.
- February 28: 2016 FISA Indoor Rowing World Championships in (United States) Boston
  - Men's Lightweight winner: (Denmark) Steffen Bonde
  - Men's Heavyweight winner: (United States) James Letten
  - Women's Lightweight winner: (Scotland) Robyn Hart-Winks
  - Women's Heavyweight winner: (United States) Michelle Lazorchak
- March 22–24: 2016 FISA Americas Olympic Qualification Regatta in (Chile) Valparaíso
  - M1x winner: (Mexico) Juan Carlos Cabrera Perez
  - W1x winner: (Bermuda) Michelle Parson
  - LM2x winners: (Brazil) Xavier Vela Magi / Willian Giaretton
  - LW2x winners: (Brazil) Vanessa Cozzi / Fernanda Leal Ferreira
- March 25–27: 2016 South American Rowing Championship in (Chile) Curauma
  - Argentina won the gold medal tally. Argentina and Brazil won 11 overall medals each.
- April 21–23: 2016 Paralympic Qualification Regatta in (Italy) Gavirate
  - ASW1X winner: (China) WANG Lili
  - ASM1X winner: (China) Huang Cheng
  - TAMix2X winners: China (LIU Shuang, FEI Tianming)
  - LTAMix4+ winners: Australia
- April 23–25: 2016 FISA Asian and Oceania Olympic Qualification Regatta in (South Korea) Chungju (at Tangeum Lake)
  - M1x winner: (South Korea) KIM Dong-yong
  - W1x winner: (South Korea) Kim Ye-ji
  - LM2x winners: China (SUN Man, WANG Chunxin)
  - LW2x winners: Japan (Ayami Oishi, Chiaki Tomita)
- May 6–8: 2016 European Rowing Championships in Brandenburg an der Havel (at Lake Beetzsee)
  - Great Britain won the gold medal tally. Germany won the overall medal tally.
- May 22–25: 2016 FISA European and Final Olympic Qualification Regatta in (Switzerland) Lucerne (at Lake Rotsee)
  - Belgium, the Czech Republic, and Russia won 2 gold medals each. New Zealand won the overall medal tally.
- July 9 & 10: 2016 European Rowing Junior Championships in (Lithuania) Trakai (at Lake Galvė)
  - Germany won both the gold and overall medal tallies.
- August 21–28: 2016 World Rowing Championships in (Netherlands) Rotterdam (at the Willem-Alexander Baan)
  - Great Britain won both the gold and overall medal tallies.
- August 21–28: World Rowing Junior Championships 2016 in (Netherlands) Rotterdam
  - Italy won the gold medal tally. Germany won the overall medal tally.
- August 21–28: 2016 World Rowing U23 Championships in Rotterdam
  - The Netherlands won the gold medal tally. Germany won the overall medal tally.
- September 2–4: 2016 World University Rowing Championships in Poznań
  - The Czech Republic and Germany won 4 gold medals each. Poland won the overall medal tally.
- September 9–11: 2016 World Rowing Masters Regatta in (Denmark) Copenhagen (at Lake Bagsværd)
  - For results, click here.
- October 21–23: 2016 World Rowing Coastal Championships in Monaco
  - CM4x+ winner: (Czech Republic) Team Dukla Praha
  - CW2x winner: (Italy) Team Circolo Canottieri Saturnia
  - CM1x winner: (Spain) Team Real Club Mediterraneo
  - CW4x+ winner: (France) Team Club Nautique de Nice
  - CM2x winner: (Spain) Team Real Círculo de Labradores
  - CW1x winner: (Republic of Ireland) Team Killorglin Rowing Club

=== 2016 World Rowing Cup ===
- April 15–17: WRC #1 in (Italy) Varese (at Lake Varese)
  - The Netherlands won both the gold and overall medal tallies.
- May 27–29: WRC #2 in (Switzerland) Lucerne (at Lake Rotsee)
  - New Zealand won both the gold and overall medal tallies.
- June 17–19: WRC #3 (final) in (Poland) Poznań (at Lake Malta)
  - New Zealand won the gold medal tally. New Zealand and Great Britain won 11 overall medals each.

== Sailing ==
=== 2016 Summer Olympics (ISAF) ===
- August 8–18: 2016 Summer Olympics in Rio de Janeiro at the Marina da Glória
  - Men
  - Men's RS:X: (gold) (Netherlands) Dorian van Rijsselberghe; (silver) (United Kingdom) Nick Dempsey; (bronze) (France) Pierre Le Coq
  - Men's Laser: (gold) (Australia) Tom Burton; (silver) (Croatia) Tonči Stipanović; (bronze) (New Zealand) Sam Meech
  - Men's Finn: (gold) (United Kingdom) Giles Scott; (silver) (Slovenia) Vasilij Žbogar; (bronze) (United States) Caleb Paine
  - Men's 470:
  - (gold) Croatia (Šime Fantela & Igor Marenić)
  - (silver) Australia (Mathew Belcher & William Ryan)
  - (bronze) Greece (Panagiotis Mantis & Pavlos Kagialis)
  - Men's 49er:
  - (gold) New Zealand (Peter Burling & Blair Tuke)
  - (silver) Australia (Nathan Outteridge & Iain Jensen)
  - (bronze) Germany (Erik Heil & Thomas Plössel)
  - Women
  - Women's RS:X: (gold) (France) Charline Picon; (silver) (China) Chen Peina; (bronze) (Russia) Stefania Elfutina
  - Women's Laser Radial: (gold) (Netherlands) Marit Bouwmeester; (silver) (Republic of Ireland) Annalise Murphy; (bronze) (Denmark) Anne-Marie Rindom
  - Women's 470:
  - (gold) Great Britain (Hannah Mills & Saskia Clark)
  - (silver) New Zealand (Jo Aleh & Polly Powrie)
  - (bronze) France (Camille Lecointre & Hélène Defrance)
  - Women's 49erFX:
  - (gold) Brazil (Martine Grael & Kahena Kunze)
  - (silver) New Zealand (Alex Maloney & Molly Meech)
  - (bronze) Denmark (Jena Hansen & Katja Salskov-Iversen)
  - Mixed Narca 17:
  - (gold) Argentina (Santiago Lange & Cecilia Carranza Saroli)
  - (silver) Australia (Jason Waterhouse & Lisa Darmanin)
  - (bronze) Austria (Thomas Zajac & Tanja Frank)

=== World sailing championships ===
- June 14–18: 2016 ISAF Youth Match Racing World Championships in (France) / (New Caledonia) Nouméa
  - Winners: Australia (Will Dargaville, Sarah Parker, Josh Dawson, James Farquharson)
- September 21–25: 2016 ISAF Women's Match Racing World Championship in (United States) Sheboygan, Wisconsin
  - Winner: (Sweden) Anna Kjellberg
- September 25–30: 2016 FISU World University Sailing Championship in Perth
  - Open and Women's winners: Australia
- December 14–20: 2016 ISAF Youth Sailing World Championships in (New Zealand) Auckland
  - Note: Was scheduled to be held in Oman. However, it withdrew, due to the alleged national discriminatory practices against Israel.
  - Australia and Great Britain won 2 gold medals each. Australia, the United States, Israel, Italy, and France won 3 overall medals each.
  - Nations Trophy winner: Italy

=== 2016 ISAF Sailing World Cup ===
- December 7–13, 2015: SWC #1 in Melbourne (#1 and at Port Phillip)
  - Australia won both the gold and overall medal tallies.
- January 23–29: SWC #2 in (United States) Miami (at Biscayne Bay)
  - The Netherlands, Great Britain, and Spain won 2 gold medals each. The Netherlands won the overall medal tally.
- April 25 – May 1: SWC #3 in (France) Hyères (at Rade de Hyères)
  - Australia and Poland won 2 gold medals each. Australia won the overall medal tally.
- June 6–12: SWC #4 in (United Kingdom) Weymouth and Portland, Dorset (at both Portland Harbour and Weymouth Bay)
  - Great Britain won both the gold and overall medal tallies.
- September 19–25: SWC #5 in Qingdao (at Fushan Bay)
  - China won both the gold and overall medal tallies.
- December 4–11: SWC #6 (final) in Melbourne #2
  - Note: Abu Dhabi withdrew from hosting this event from October 24–28, due to the allocation of the World Sailing Annual Conference to Europe.
  - Australia won both the gold and overall medal tallies.

== Water polo ==
- September 4, 2015 – December 11, 2016: FINA General Events Calendar

=== 2016 Summer Olympics (FINA–WP) ===
- August 6–20: 2016 Summer Olympics in (Brazil) Rio de Janeiro at the Maria Lenk Aquatics Center
  - Men: (gold) Serbia; (silver) Croatia; (bronze) Italy
  - Women: (gold) United States; (silver) Italy; (bronze) Russia

=== World water polo championships ===
- August 26 – September 3: 2016 FINA Men's Youth Water Polo World Championships in Podgorica
  - Croatia defeated Montenegro, 16–13, in the final. Hungary took the bronze medal.
- December 12–18: 2016 FINA World Women's Youth Water Polo Championships in (New Zealand) Auckland
  - Russia defeated Spain, 9–7, to win their first FINA World Women's Youth Water Polo Championships title.
  - Italy took the bronze medal.

=== FINA Water Polo World League ===
- October 20, 2015 – June 26, 2016: 2016 FINA Men's Water Polo World League
  - October 20, 2015 – May 10, 2016: 2015–16 European six-round preliminary water polo matches
    - Greece, Serbia, and Italy all qualified to compete in the Superfinal.
  - May 10–15: 2016 Intercontinental water polo tournament (men) in Yokohama
    - The United States, Australia, Brazil, and Japan all qualified to compete in the Superfinal.
  - June 21–26: 2016 FINA Men's Water Polo World League Superfinal in (China) Huizhou
    - Serbia defeated the United States, 10–6, to win their fourth consecutive and eighth overall FINA Men's Water Polo World League title.
    - Greece took the bronze medal.
- October 27, 2015 – June 12, 2016: 2016 FINA Women's Water Polo World League
  - October 27, 2015 – May 3, 2016: 2015–16 European six-round preliminary water polo matches
    - Italy, Spain, and Russia all qualified to be in the Superfinal.
  - February 16–21: 2016 Intercontinental water polo tournament (women) in Lewisville, Texas
    - The United States, Australia, Canada, and Brazil all qualified to be in the Superfinal.
  - June 7–12: 2016 FINA Women's Water Polo World League Superfinal in (China) Shanghai
    - The United States defeated Spain, 13–9, to win their third consecutive and tenth overall FINA Women's Water Polo World League title.
    - Australia took the bronze medal.

=== LEN (Ligue Européenne de Natation) ===
- September 4, 2015 – June 4, 2016: 2015–16 LEN Champions League (final six in (Hungary) Budapest)
  - (Croatia) Jug Dubrovnik defeated (Greece) Olympiacos, 6–4, to win their fourth LEN Champions League title. (Hungary) Szolnoki VSK took third place.
- September 30, 2015 – April 30, 2016: 2015–16 LEN Euro Cup
  - (Italy) AN Brescia defeated (Russia) Sintez Kazan, 23–10 on aggregate, to win their first LEN Euro Cup title.
- December 4, 2015 – April 23, 2016: 2015–16 LEN Women's Champions' Cup
  - April 15 & 16: 2015–16 Women's LEN Trophy Final Four in (Spain) Mataró
    - (Spain) CN Mataró defeated (Greece) NC Vouliagmeni, 6–5, to win their first Women's LEN Trophy title. (Hungary) Szentesi VK took the bronze medal.
  - April 23 & 24: 2015–16 Women's LEN Euro League Final Four in (Spain) Sabadell
    - (Spain) CN Sabadell defeated (Hungary) UVSE Budapest, 11–8, to win their fourth LEN Euro League Women title. (Russia) Kinef Kirishi took the bronze medal.
- January 10–23: 2016 European Water Polo Championships for Men and Women in Belgrade
  - Men: Serbia defeated Montenegro, 10–8, to win their third consecutive and four overall European Water Polo Championships title. Hungary took third place.
  - Women: Hungary defeated the Netherlands, 9–7, to win their third Women's European Water Polo Championships title. Italy took third place.
- September 10–18: 2016 Women's European Under 19 Water Polo Championships in The Hague
  - The Netherlands defeated Spain, 9–7, in the final. Greece took third place.
- September 11–18: 2016 Men's European Under 19 Water Polo Championships in (Netherlands) Alphen aan den Rijn
  - Serbia defeated Italy, 12–9, in the final. Spain took third place.
