= Shooting at the 2018 Asian Games – Men's 10 metre running target =

Men's 10 metre running target at the 2018 Asian Games
- Venue: Jakabaring Shooting Range
- Dates: 23–24 August 2018
- Competitors: 13 from 7 nations

Medalists
gold medal	Jeong You-jin	South Korea
silver medal	Pak Myong-won	North Korea
bronze medal	Ngô Hữu Vượng	Vietnam

The men's 10 metre running target event at the 2018 Asian Games in Jakarta, Indonesia took place on 23–24 August at the Jakabaring International Shooting Range.

== Schedule ==
All times are Western Indonesia Time (UTC+07:00)

Date	Time	Event
Thursday, 23 August 2018	09:00	Qualification slow
Friday, 24 August 2018	09:00	Qualification fast
Friday, 24 August 2018	15:00	Finals

== Records ==
Prior to this competition, the existing world, Asian and Games records were as follows.

World Record	Manfred Kurzer (GER)	590	Athens, Greece	19 August 2004
Asian Record	Zhai Yujia (CHN)	590	Guangzhou, China	16 November 2010
Games Record	Zhai Yujia (CHN)	590	Guangzhou, China	16 November 2010

== Results ==
=== Qualification ===
Rank	Athlete	Slow			Fast			Total	Xs	S-off	Notes
Rank	Athlete	1	2	3	1	2	3	Total	Xs	S-off	Notes
1	Pak Myong-won (PRK)	95	96	94	97	97	94	573	17		
2	Ngô Hữu Vượng (VIE)	94	99	95	95	97	91	571	15		
3	Jeong You-jin (KOR)	94	96	91	96	95	96	568	14	20	
4	Cho Se-jong (KOR)	97	97	93	86	97	98	568	13	19	
5	Muhammad Sejahtera Dwi Putra (INA)	95	96	99	92	94	91	567	13		
6	Xie Durun (CHN)	92	99	98	91	92	95	567	11		
7	Kwon Kwang-il (PRK)	91	97	99	93	94	93	567	11		
8	Mohammed Abouteama (QAT)	97	92	96	90	95	93	563	10		
9	Bakhtiyar Ibrayev (KAZ)	95	96	96	89	91	95	562	11		
10	Gan Yu (CHN)	93	95	94	93	93	94	562	7		
11	Irfandi Julio (INA)	94	92	93	93	96	92	560	16		
12	Trần Hoàng Vũ (VIE)	93	96	96	91	94	86	556	13		
13	Rassim Mologly (KAZ)	91	91	93	86	92	91	544	8		

=== Knockout round ===
Semifinals
1	Pak Myong-won (PRK)	7
4	Cho Se-jong (KOR)	5
2	Ngô Hữu Vượng (VIE)	3
3	Jeong You-jin (KOR)	6

Gold medal match
1	Pak Myong-won (PRK)	4
3	Jeong You-jin (KOR)	6
Bronze medal match
4	Cho Se-jong (KOR)	1
2	Ngô Hữu Vượng (VIE)	6

==== Semifinals ====
Athlete	Score	1	2	3	4	5	6	7	8	9	10	11	12
Pak Myong-won (PRK)	7	10.3	8.9	9.4	8.4	10.4	9.4	9.2	10.7	9.0	7.5	9.5	9.2
Cho Se-jong (KOR)	5	10.2	8.8	10.8	7.0	9.0	10.0	9.3	8.8	10.3	10.8	9.0	9.1
Jeong You-jin (KOR)	6	7.4	10.2	10.6	10.8	10.2	7.8	8.8	10.5	10.0	9.0	10.7	
Ngô Hữu Vượng (VIE)	3	9.5	10.2	10.0	9.8	9.5	9.5	9.6	10.5	9.6	8.8	9.8	

==== Bronze medal match ====
Athlete	Score	1	2	3	4	5	6	7
Ngô Hữu Vượng (VIE)	6	9.9	10.5	10.1	10.2	10.1	10.0	10.2
Cho Se-jong (KOR)	1	10.5	10.4	7.4	10.1	9.8	9.5	10.1

==== Gold medal match ====
Athlete	Score	1	2	3	4	5	6	7	8	9	10
Jeong You-jin (KOR)	6	9.4	9.0	10.5	8.6	9.8	10.3	8.1	0.0	10.5	10.0
Pak Myong-won (PRK)	4	7.9	8.8	9.8	10.6	8.1	10.1	9.5	10.2	10.7	9.5
