= Shooting at the 2014 Asian Games – Women's trap team =

Women's trap team at the 2014 Asian Games
- Venue: Gyeonggido Shooting Range
- Dates: 23 September 2014
- Competitors: 30 from 10 nations

Medalists
gold medal	Kazakhstan; Anastassiya Davydova, Mariya Dmitriyenko, Oxana Sereda
silver medal	China; Chen Fang, Zhu Jingyu, Zhu Mei
bronze medal	North Korea; Chae Hye-gyong, Pak Yong-hui, Yang Sol-i

The women's trap team competition at the 2014 Asian Games in Incheon, South Korea was held on 23 September at the Gyeonggido Shooting Range.

== Schedule ==
All times are Korea Standard Time (UTC+09:00)

Date	Time	Event
Tuesday, 23 September 2014	09:30	Final

== Records ==
Prior to this competition, the existing world, Asian and Games records were as follows.

World Record	Italy	214	Larnaca, Cyprus	24 May 2012
Asian Record	China	212	Kuala Lumpur, Malaysia	23 November 2011
Games Record	China	200	Guangzhou, China	19 November 2010

== Results ==
Rank	Team	Round			Total	Notes
Rank	Team	1	2	3	Total	Notes
1st place, gold medalist(s)	Kazakhstan (KAZ)	70	66	67	203	GR
	Anastassiya Davydova	23	24	24	71	
	Mariya Dmitriyenko	24	24	22	70	
	Oxana Sereda	23	18	21	62	
2nd place, silver medalist(s)	China (CHN)	64	68	67	199	
	Chen Fang	18	24	24	66	
	Zhu Jingyu	24	24	22	70	
	Zhu Mei	22	20	21	63	
3rd place, bronze medalist(s)	North Korea (PRK)	67	64	67	198	
	Chae Hye-gyong	25	20	24	69	
	Pak Yong-hui	21	22	22	65	
	Yang Sol-i	21	22	21	64	
4	Iran (IRI)	68	63	61	192	
	Shiva Farahpour	23	22	21	66	
	Bahareh Jahandar	22	20	18	60	
	Marzieh Parvareshnia	23	21	22	66	
5	Japan (JPN)	64	61	66	191	
	Keiko Hattori	22	20	21	63	
	Megumi Inoue	18	20	21	59	
	Yukie Nakayama	24	21	24	69	
6	Thailand (THA)	68	62	60	190	
	Chattaya Kitcharoen	23	23	22	68	
	Thitithan Nongpromma	24	21	18	63	
	Nanpapas Viravaidya	21	18	20	59	
7	South Korea (KOR)	64	62	63	189	
	Eom So-yeon	19	22	19	60	
	Kang Gee-eun	24	20	22	66	
	Lee Bo-na	21	20	22	63	
8	India (IND)	60	62	66	188	
	Shagun Chowdhary	20	19	20	59	
	Shreyasi Singh	20	24	22	66	
	Seema Tomar	20	19	24	63	
9	Chinese Taipei (TPE)	60	59	63	182	
	Hsu Jie-yu	19	20	22	61	
	Huang Yen-hua	18	18	21	57	
	Lin Yi-chun	23	21	20	64	
10	Qatar (QAT)	62	60	55	177	
	Amna Al-Abdulla	22	23	22	67	
	Kholoud Al-Khalaf	22	22	17	61	
	Nawal Al-Khalaf	18	15	16	49	
