= Chen Fang =

Chen Fang is the name of:

- Chun Afong or Chen Fang (陳芳), Qing ambassador to the Kingdom of Hawaii
- Chen Fang (sport shooter) (陈放; b. 1983), Chinese sport shooter
