= Diving at the 2010 Asian Games – Women's 1 metre springboard =

Women's 1 metre springboard at the 2010 Asian Games
- Venue: Aoti Aquatics Centre
- Date: 24 November 2010
- Competitors: 13 from 8 nations

Medalists
gold medal	Wu Minxia	China
silver medal	Zheng Shuangxue	China
bronze medal	Cheong Jun Hoong	Malaysia

The women's 1 metre springboard diving competition at the 2010 Asian Games in Guangzhou was held on 24 November at the Aoti Aquatics Centre.

== Schedule ==
All times are China Standard Time (UTC+08:00)

Date	Time	Event
Wednesday, 24 November 2010	14:00	Final

== Results ==
Rank	Athlete	Dive					Total
Rank	Athlete	1	2	3	4	5	Total
1st place, gold medalist(s)	Wu Minxia (CHN)	61.20	67.60	60.95	63.60	72.80	326.15
2nd place, silver medalist(s)	Zheng Shuangxue (CHN)	58.80	55.20	61.20	62.40	66.30	303.90
3rd place, bronze medalist(s)	Cheong Jun Hoong (MAS)	54.00	54.60	50.60	55.20	57.20	271.60
4	Leong Mun Yee (MAS)	56.40	58.50	48.30	50.40	54.60	268.20
5	Choi Sut Ian (MAC)	49.20	54.60	44.85	54.00	58.50	261.15
6	Sayaka Shibusawa (JPN)	50.60	53.30	38.40	58.50	54.00	254.80
7	Risa Asada (JPN)	49.20	52.00	48.30	55.20	42.90	247.60
8	Sheila Mae Perez (PHI)	50.70	42.55	46.80	46.80	45.50	232.35
9	Lee Yae-rim (KOR)	50.70	34.80	47.15	46.80	44.00	223.45
10	Cho Eun-bi (KOR)	48.10	45.60	44.85	50.40	30.80	219.75
11	Della Dinarsari Harimurti (INA)	52.80	42.90	43.05	24.15	37.80	200.70
12	Choi Sut Kuan (MAC)	43.20	39.60	41.40	32.55	38.85	195.60
13	Nguyễn Vũ Thảo Quyên (VIE)	28.80	43.20	41.40	37.80	28.35	179.55
