= Diving at the 2014 Asian Games – Women's 10 metre platform =

Women's 10 metre platform at the 2014 Asian Games
- Venue: Munhak Park Tae-hwan Aquatics Center
- Date: 2 October 2014
- Competitors: 10 from 5 nations

Medalists
| gold medal | Si Yajie | China |
| silver medal | Huang Xiaohui | China |
| bronze medal | Kim Un-hyang | North Korea |

The women's 10 metre platform diving competition at the 2014 Asian Games in Incheon was held on 2 October at the Munhak Park Tae-hwan Aquatics Center.

== Schedule ==
All times are Korea Standard Time (UTC+09:00)

| Date | Time | Event |
|---|---|---|
| Thursday, 2 October 2014 | 16:25 | Final |

== Results ==
| Rank | Athlete | Dive | | | | | Total |
| Rank | Athlete | 1 | 2 | 3 | 4 | 5 | Total |
|---|---|---|---|---|---|---|---|
| 1st place, gold medalist(s) | Si Yajie (CHN) | 76.50 | 81.60 | 73.60 | 84.15 | 78.40 | 394.25 |
| 2nd place, silver medalist(s) | Huang Xiaohui (CHN) | 54.00 | 62.40 | 75.20 | 89.10 | 81.60 | 362.30 |
| 3rd place, bronze medalist(s) | Kim Un-hyang (PRK) | 78.40 | 72.00 | 48.00 | 75.90 | 84.15 | 358.45 |
| 4 | Loh Zhiayi (MAS) | 62.40 | 72.00 | 52.20 | 57.60 | 76.80 | 321.00 |
| 5 | Minami Itahashi (JPN) | 60.00 | 37.50 | 75.60 | 76.80 | 65.60 | 315.50 |
| 6 | Song Nam-hyang (PRK) | 57.60 | 76.50 | 58.00 | 43.20 | 76.80 | 312.10 |
| 7 | Pandelela Rinong (MAS) | 58.50 | 65.25 | 64.00 | 44.80 | 76.80 | 309.35 |
| 8 | Fuka Tatsumi (JPN) | 64.50 | 37.50 | 54.45 | 59.45 | 70.40 | 286.30 |
| 9 | Ko Hyeon-ju (KOR) | 58.80 | 46.40 | 61.60 | 63.00 | 38.40 | 268.20 |
| 10 | Cho Eun-bi (KOR) | 64.40 | 72.00 | 30.45 | 31.35 | 68.80 | 267.00 |
