= Diving at the 2014 Asian Games – Women's synchronized 3 metre springboard =

Women's synchronized 3 metre springboard at the 2014 Asian Games
- Venue: Munhak Park Tae-hwan Aquatics Center
- Date: 29 September 2014
- Competitors: 12 from 6 nations

Medalists
| gold medal | Shi Tingmao; Wu Minxia | China |
| silver medal | Cheong Jun Hoong; Ng Yan Yee | Malaysia |
| bronze medal | Choe Un-gyong; Kim Jin-ok | North Korea |

The women's synchronized 3 metre springboard diving competition at the 2014 Asian Games in Incheon was held on 29 September at the Munhak Park Tae-hwan Aquatics Center.

== Schedule ==
All times are Korea Standard Time (UTC+09:00)

| Date | Time | Event |
|---|---|---|
| Monday, 29 September 2014 | 14:00 | Final |

== Results ==
| Rank | Team | Dive | | | | | Total |
| Rank | Team | 1 | 2 | 3 | 4 | 5 | Total |
|---|---|---|---|---|---|---|---|
| 1st place, gold medalist(s) | China (CHN); Shi Tingmao; Wu Minxia | 52.80 | 51.60 | 72.90 | 67.50 | 73.80 | 318.60 |
| 2nd place, silver medalist(s) | Malaysia (MAS); Cheong Jun Hoong; Ng Yan Yee | 46.20 | 46.20 | 67.50 | 63.00 | 64.80 | 287.70 |
| 3rd place, bronze medalist(s) | North Korea (PRK); Choe Un-gyong; Kim Jin-ok | 46.20 | 45.00 | 60.30 | 57.12 | 65.70 | 274.32 |
| 4 | South Korea (KOR); Cho Eun-bi; Kim Su-ji | 47.40 | 45.00 | 54.27 | 54.60 | 66.36 | 267.63 |
| 5 | Macau (MAC); Choi Sut Ian; Lo I Teng | 44.40 | 40.80 | 51.84 | 54.00 | 63.00 | 254.04 |
| 6 | Singapore (SIN); Fong Kay Yian; Myra Lee | 41.40 | 40.20 | 35.28 | 47.04 | 41.76 | 205.68 |
