= Diving at the 2014 Asian Games – Women's 3 metre springboard =

Women's 3 metre springboard at the 2014 Asian Games
- Venue: Munhak Park Tae-hwan Aquatics Center
- Date: 3 October 2014
- Competitors: 12 from 7 nations

Medalists
gold medal	He Zi	China
silver medal	Wang Han	China
bronze medal	Cheong Jun Hoong	Malaysia

The women's 3 metre springboard diving competition at the 2014 Asian Games in Incheon was held on 3 October at the Munhak Park Tae-hwan Aquatics Center.

== Schedule ==
All times are Korea Standard Time (UTC+09:00)

Date	Time	Event
Friday, 3 October 2014	14:00	Final

== Results ==
Rank	Athlete	Dive					Total
Rank	Athlete	1	2	3	4	5	Total
1st place, gold medalist(s)	He Zi (CHN)	75.00	72.00	75.00	75.95	76.50	374.45
2nd place, silver medalist(s)	Wang Han (CHN)	70.50	72.00	70.50	71.30	75.00	359.30
3rd place, bronze medalist(s)	Cheong Jun Hoong (MAS)	63.00	70.00	72.00	52.50	69.60	327.10
4	Sayaka Shibusawa (JPN)	54.00	49.50	55.80	66.00	63.00	288.30
5	Ng Yan Yee (MAS)	67.50	40.30	58.50	54.00	67.50	287.80
6	Kim Su-ji (KOR)	54.00	56.70	53.20	56.00	52.20	272.10
7	Minami Itahashi (JPN)	67.50	64.50	58.50	31.50	48.05	270.05
8	Kim Chae-hyeon (KOR)	49.20	61.60	61.60	44.55	52.80	269.75
9	Choi Sut Ian (MAC)	54.00	54.00	52.50	52.50	56.55	269.55
10	Lo I Teng (MAC)	46.80	67.50	60.00	40.50	48.00	262.80
11	Sharon Chan (HKG)	57.60	52.65	33.60	49.00	50.40	243.25
12	Myra Lee (SIN)	46.80	48.60	43.40	42.00	43.20	224.00
