= Cheong Jun Hoong =

Malaysian diver (born 1990)

Cheong Jun Hoong AMN
Personal information
- Native name: 张俊虹
- Full name: Cheong Jun Hoong
- Nickname: Jun
- Nationality: Malaysian
- Born: 16 April 1990 (age 36) Ipoh, Perak, Malaysia
- Height: 1.5 m (4 ft 11 in)

Sport
- Country: Malaysia
- Events: 10 m, 10 m synchro, 3 m, 1 m
- Partner: Pandelela Rinong
- Coached by: Yang Zhuliang
- Retired: January 4, 2022
Medal record
Representing Malaysia
Olympic Games
Silver medal – second place	2016 Rio de Janeiro	10 m synchro platform
World Championships
Gold medal – first place	2017 Budapest	10 m platform
Bronze medal – third place	2017 Budapest	10 m synchro platform
FINA Diving World Series
Gold medal – first place	2018 Montreal	10 m synchro platform
FINA Diving World Cup
Silver medal – second place	2014 Shanghai	10 m synchro platform
Silver medal – second place	2016 Rio de Janeiro	10 m synchro platform
Asian Games
Silver medal – second place	2014 Incheon	3 m synchro springboard
Bronze medal – third place	2010 Guangzhou	1 m springboard
Bronze medal – third place	2014 Incheon	3 m springboard
Commonwealth Games
Gold medal – first place	2018 Gold Coast	10 m synchro platform
Southeast Asian Games
Gold medal – first place	2007 Nakhon Ratchasima	10 m synchro platform
Gold medal – first place	2011 Palembang	3 m springboard
Gold medal – first place	2013 Naypyidaw	3 m springboard
Gold medal – first place	2013 Naypyidaw	3 m synchro springboard
Gold medal – first place	2015 Singapore	3 m springboard
Gold medal – first place	2017 Kuala Lumpur	1 m springboard
Bronze medal – third place	2005 Manila	3 m synchro springboard
Bronze medal – third place	2005 Manila	10 m platform
Bronze medal – third place	2007 Nakhon Ratchasima	10 m platform

Cheong Jun Hoong (Chinese: 張俊虹; pinyin: Zhāng Jùnhóng) AMN (born 16 April 1990) is a retired Malaysian diver. She won a silver medal in the synchronised 10m platform event with Pandelela Rinong at the 2016 Summer Olympics. At the 2017 World Aquatics Championships, she became Malaysia's first diving world champion after winning the 10m platform event.

== Early and personal life ==
Cheong Jun Hoong was born in Ipoh, Perak. She is the daughter of Cheong Sun Meng and Leow Lai Kuan. She has a younger sister. Her fascination in aquatics began at the age of four. At age nine, she started her training in diving with Perak's state coach, Zhou Xiyang. In 2004, she was offered a place at the Bukit Jalil Sports School. She graduated with a bachelor's degree in communications from Universiti Putra Malaysia.

== Career ==
Cheong won a bronze medal in 1m springboard at the 2010 Asian Games. She made her Olympic debut at the 2012 London Olympics where she finished 20th in 3m springboard and eighth in 3m synchronized springboard with Pandelela Rinong.

Cheong represented Malaysia at the 2014 Commonwealth Games, where she competed in the 1 m, 3 m, and 10 m events. She placed 8th in the 1 m event, 12th in the 3 m event, 5th in the 3 m synchronised event, 6th in the 10 m event and 4th in the 10 m synchro event with partner Leong Mun Yee, narrowly losing the bronze medal to fellow athletes Pandelela Rinong and Nur Dhabitah Sabri. At the 2014 Asian Games in Incheon, she won a silver medal in 3m synchro springboard with Ng Yan Yee. She also won a bronze medal in individual 3m event.

In August 2016, she participated at the Rio Summer Olympics in the 3m platform, 10m synchronized platform with Pandelela Rinong and 3m synchronized springboard with Nur Dhabitah Sabri. She won her first Olympic medal, a silver in the 10m synchronized platform with a final score of 344.34. However, she did not qualify for the final of the 3m event. She placed 5th in the 3m synchro event. Due to her persisting back pain, in October 2016 she withdrew from the 2016 FIN A Diving Grand Prix in Kuching, Sarawak.

In June 2017, Cheong returned from a back injury to win the bronze medal in the 1m springboard event at the 7th Asian Diving Cup in Macau after withdrawing from the Kazan and Windsor legs of the 2017 FINA Diving World Series earlier. Cheong became Malaysia's first diving World Champion, when she took home the gold medal in the 10m platform event in the 2017 World Aquatics Championships in Budapest, pipping her closest rival by just 1.5 points. Four of the seven judges gave a perfect 10 on her best dive in the competition, and she finished with an overall score of 397.5. She also won a bronze in the 10m synchronized 10 platform event with Pandelela Rinong with a total score of 328.74.

Cheong was chosen as one of the flag-bearers for Malaysia at the 2017 Southeast Asian Games alongside two reigning world champions cyclist Azizulhasni Awang and silat exponent Mohd Al-Jufferi Jamari.

=== Retirement ===
On 4 January 2022, Cheong announced her retirement after her contract as a full-time athlete with the National Sports Council and Malaysia Swimming was not renewed. One of the reasons Cheong provided for her retirement was a second knee injury she acquired in 2018 and had not been able to re-achieve a certain level of performance since then.

== Awards ==
- OCM-Coca-Cola Olympian Award: 2016
- National Sportswoman of the Year: 2017

== Honours ==
=== Honours of Malaysia ===
- Malaysia
  - Member of the Order of the Defender of the Realm (AMN) (2017)
