= Huang Xiaohui =

Chinese diver

Personal information
- Born: 1 July 1997 (age 29) Nanning, Guangxi, China

Sport
- Country: China
Medal record
Women's Diving
Representing China
Asian Games
Silver medal – second place	2014 Asian Games	10 m platform

Huang Xiaohui (Chinese: 黄小惠; pinyin: Huáng Xiǎohuì, born 1 July 1997) is a Chinese diver. At the 2014 Asian Games, she won the silver medal of the women's 10 m platform.

== Early life ==
Born on 1997 in Guangxi, Huang was sent to the Nanning Sports Bureau swimming pool by her mother to learn how to swim when she was six years old. Not long after learning, a coach noticed Huang's talent and suggested to her mother to let Huang learn diving. In this way, Huang was recommended to the Guangxi diving team, where she started her diving career.

== Sports career ==
In 2010, Huang was transferred to the People's Liberation Army Navy and in 2012, she became a member of the Chinese diving team. In 2013, she won the gold medal at the women's 10-meter diving platform at the 2013 National Diving Championship and in the same year, at the 12th National Games of China in Liaoning, she won the bronze medal in women's 10-meter diving platform. In 2014, she won gold medals in the mixed diving (with Chen Aisen) and the women's 10-meter single platform at the 19th FINA Diving World Cup in Shanghai.

On October 2, 2014, in the women's single 10-meter platform diving competition at the 2014 Asian Games in Incheon, she won the silver medal with 362.30 points. In October 2019, she won the gold medal in the women's double 3-meter springboard diving at the 2019 Military World Games in Wuhan.

On September 14, 2021, at the 14th National Games of China in Shaanxi, Huang represented the Guangxi diving team. In the women's 3-meter springboard diving final, she won the bronze medal with 347.40 points.

== Awards and honors ==
- On March 24, 2021, Huang was awarded the title of First-Class Hero in Qingxiu District by Luo Wenyong, a member of the Standing Committee of the Party Committee of the Guangxi Military Region and director of the Political Work Bureau.
