= 2016 Oceania Canoe Slalom Championships =

The 2016 Oceania Canoe Slalom Championships took place from 19 to 21 February 2016 in Penrith, Australia, under the auspices of International Canoe Federation (ICF), at the Penrith Whitewater Stadium facility, which was also the venue for the canoe/kayak slalom events at the 2000 Summer Olympics.

== Schedule ==
The schedule of events.

Date	Starting Time	Events
19 February	09:15	C1 Men Heats– 1st run
19 February	10:19	K1 Women heats – 1st run
19 February	11:18	C1 Men heats – 2nd run
19 February	12:22	K1 Women heats – 2nd run
19 February	14:15	K1 Men heats – 1st run
19 February	15:16	C2 Men heats – 1st run
19 February	15:43	K1 Men heats - 2nd run
19 February	16:44	C2 Men heats - 2nd run
20 February	09:15	C1 Men semifinals
20 February	10:05	K1 Women semifinals
20 February	10:55	C2 Men semifinals
20 February	11:50	C1 Men final
20 February	12:10	K1 Women final
20 February	12:30	C2 Men final
21 February	08:34	C1 Women heats - 1st run
21 February	09:34	C1 Women heats - 2nd run
21 February	10:00	K1 Men semifinals
21 February	11:05	C1 Women semifinals
21 February	12:10	K1 Men finals
21 February	12:30	C1 Women finals

=== Men ===
==== Canoe ====
Event	Gold		Silver		Bronze	
C-1	Matej Beňuš (SVK)	99.36	Nicolas Peschier (FRA)	100.41	Adam Burgess (GBR)	100.65
C-2	Germany; Franz Anton; Jan Benzien	106.55	Germany; Kai Müller; Kevin Müller	109.34	France; Pierre Picco; Hugo Biso	110.31

==== Kayak ====
Event	Gold		Silver		Bronze	
K-1	Vavřinec Hradilek (CZE)	92.08	Sebastian Schubert (GER)	92.17	Vít Přindiš (CZE)	94.48

=== Women ===
==== Canoe ====
Event	Gold		Silver		Bronze	
C-1	Jessica Fox (AUS)	119.02	Rosalyn Lawrence (AUS)	120.26	Noemie Fox (AUS)	121.54

==== Kayak ====
Event	Gold		Silver		Bronze	
K-1	Jana Dukátová (SVK)	105.09	Jessica Fox (AUS)	105.18	Rosalyn Lawrence (AUS)	106.54
