= Choe Un-gyong (diver) =

North Korean diver (born 1994)

Personal information
- Nationality: North Korean
- Born: 20 November 1994 (age 31)

Sport
- Sport: Diving
Medal record
Asian Games
Bronze medal – third place	2014 Incheon	3 m synchro
Universiade
Gold medal – first place	2017 Taipei	Team
Silver medal – second place	2017 Taipei	1 m springboard

Korean name
- Hangul: 최은경
- RR: Choe Eungyeong
- MR: Ch'oe Ŭn'gyŏng

Choe Un-gyong (born 20 November 1994) is a North Korean diver. She won bronze with partner Kim Jin-ok in 3 m synchronized springboard event at the 2014 Asian Games and won silver in 1 metre springboard event at the 2017 Summer Universiade.
