= Kim Jin-ok =

North Korean diver (born 1990)

Personal information
- Nationality: North Korean
- Born: 15 September 1990 (age 35) Pyongyang, North Korea

Sport
- Country: North Korea
- Sport: Diving
Medal record
Asian Games
Bronze medal – third place	2014 Incheon	3 m sync

Korean name
- Hangul: 김진옥
- RR: Gim Jinok
- MR: Kim Chinok

Kim Jin-ok (born 15 September 1990) is a North Korean diver. She competed in the 10 metre platform event at the 2008, 2012 Summer Olympics and 2010 Asian Games. She won bronze with partner Choe Un-gyong in the 3 m synchronized springboard event at the 2014 Asian Games.
