= Chen Fang (sport shooter) =

Chinese sports shooter (born 1983)

Personal information
- Native name: 陈放
- Born: 19 October 1983 (age 41)

Sport
- Sport: Sports shooting

Chen Fang (Chinese: 陈放; born 19 October 1983) is a Chinese sports shooter. She competed in the women's trap event at the 2016 Summer Olympics.
