= Pak Myong-won =

North Korean sport shooter

Personal information
- Nationality: North Korean
- Born: 1 January 1986 (age 40)
- Height: 1.76 m (5 ft 9 in)
- Weight: 80 kg (176 lb)

Sport
- Country: North Korea
- Sport: Shooting
- Event: Running target shooting
Medal record
World Championships
Silver medal – second place	2018 Changwon	10 m team running target
Bronze medal – third place	2018 Changwon	10 m team running target mixed
Bronze medal – third place	2018 Changwon	50 m team running target mixed
Running Target World Championships
Silver medal – second place	2016 Suhl	10 m running target
Silver medal – second place	2016 Suhl	10 m running target mixed
Bronze medal – third place	2016 Suhl	50 m running target mixed
Bronze medal – third place	2016 Suhl	10 m team running target mixed
Asian Games
Gold medal – first place	2010 Guangzhou	10 m running target mixed
Gold medal – first place	2010 Guangzhou	10 m team running target mixed
Gold medal – first place	2018 Jakarta-Palembang	10 m running target mixed
Silver medal – second place	2010 Guangzhou	10 m team running target
Silver medal – second place	2014 Incheon	10 m team running target
Silver medal – second place	2014 Incheon	10 m team running target mixed
Silver medal – second place	2018 Jakarta-Palembang	10 m running target
Silver medal – second place	2022 Hangzhou	10 m team running target
Asian Championships
Gold medal – first place	2019 Doha	10 m running target team
Gold medal – first place	2019 Doha	10 m running target mixed
Gold medal – first place	2019 Doha	10 m running target mixed team
Bronze medal – third place	2019 Doha	10 m running target

Pak Myong-won (born 1 January 1986) is a North Korean sport shooter.

He participated at the 2018 ISSF World Shooting Championships, winning a medal.
