= Andrey Gurov (sport shooter) =

Kazakhstani sports shooter (born 1975)

Medal record

Men's shooting

Representing Kazakhstan

Asian Championships
Silver medal – second place	2012 Doha	10 m running target team
Silver medal – second place	2012 Doha	10 m running target mixed team
Bronze medal – third place	2012 Doha	10 m running target mixed

Andrey Gurov (Андрей Анатольевич Гуров, born 11 January 1975), is a Kazakhstani sport shooter who competed in the 2004 Summer Olympics.
