= Jo Yong-chol =

North Korean sport shooter (born 1987)

Personal information
- Nationality: North Korean
- Born: 6 August 1987 (age 38)
- Height: 1.72 m (5 ft 8 in)
- Weight: 65 kg (143 lb)

Sport
- Country: North Korea
- Sport: Shooting
- Event: Running target shooting
Medal record
World Championships
Silver medal – second place	2018 Changwon	10 m team running target
Bronze medal – third place	2018 Changwon	10 m team running target mixed
Bronze medal – third place	2018 Changwon	50 m team running target mixed
Asian Championships
Gold medal – first place	2019 Doha	10 m running target
Gold medal – first place	2019 Doha	10 m running target team
Gold medal – first place	2019 Doha	10 m running target mixed team

Korean name
- Hangul: 조영철
- RR: Jo Yeongcheol
- MR: Cho Yŏngch'ŏl

Jo Yong-chol (Korean: 조영철; born 6 August 1987) is a North Korean sport shooter.

He participated at the 2018 ISSF World Shooting Championships, winning a medal.
