= Cho Se-jong =

South Korean sport shooter (born 1978)

Personal information
- Nationality: South Korean
- Born: 18 August 1978 (age 47) Incheon, South Korea
- Height: 1.71 m (5 ft 7 in)
- Weight: 82 kg (181 lb)

Sport
- Country: South Korea
- Sport: Shooting
- Event: Running target shooting
Medal record
World Championships
| Bronze medal – third place | 2018 Changwon | 50 m team running target |

Cho Se-jong (Korean: 조세종; born 18 August 1978) is a South Korean sport shooter.

He participated at the 2018 ISSF World Shooting Championships, winning a medal.
