= 2018 in artistic gymnastics =

Below is a list of notable artistic gymnastics events held in 2018, as well as the medalists.

== Calendar of events ==
=== International ===
Date	Location	Event	Winner(s)	
April 4–15	(Australia) Gold Coast	Commonwealth Games	TF: Canada; AA: Elsabeth Black; VT: Shallon Olsen; UB: (England) Georgia-Mae Fenton; BB: (England) Alice Kinsella; FX: (Australia) Alexandra Eade	TF: (England) England; AA: (England) Nile Wilson; FX: (Cyprus) Marios Georgiou; PH: (Northern Ireland) Rhys McClenaghan; SR: (England) Courtney Tulloch; VT: (Australia) Christopher Remkes; PB: (Cyprus) Marios Georgiou; HB: (England) Nile Wilson
April 27–29	(Colombia) Medellín	Pacific Rim Championships	TF: United States; AA: Grace McCallum; VT: Jordan Chiles; UB: (Canada) Haley de Jong; BB: (Australia) Talia Folino; FX: Jordan Chiles	TF: United States; AA: Sam Mikulak; FX: Akash Modi; PH: Marvin Kimble; SR: Sam Mikulak; VT: (Chinese Taipei) Lee Chih Kai; PB: Akash Modi; HB: Sam Mikulak
June 22 – July 1	(Spain) Tarragona	Mediterranean Games	TF: (Italy) Italy; AA: (Italy) Lara Mori; VT: (Egypt) Nancy Taman; UB: (France) Louise Vanhille; BB: (France) Marine Boyer; FX: (Italy) Lara Mori	TF: (Spain) Spain; AA: (Cyprus) Marios Georgiou; FX: (Spain) Rayderley Zapata; PH: (France) Cyril Tommasone; SR: (Turkey) Ibrahim Colak; VT: (France) Loris Frasca; PB: (Turkey) Ahmet Onder; HB: (Cyprus) Marios Georgiou
October 6–18	(Argentina) Buenos Aires	Summer Youth Olympics	TF: (International Olympic Committee) Team Simone Biles; AA: (Italy) Giorgia Villa; VT: (Italy) Giorgia Villa; UB: (Russia) Ksenia Klimenko; BB: (China) Tang Xijing; FX: (Italy) Giorgia Villa	TF: (International Olympic Committee) Team Simone Biles; AA: (Japan) Takeru Kitazono; FX: (Japan) Takeru Kitazono; PH: (China) Yin Dehang; SR: (Japan) Takeru Kitazono; VT: (United States) Brandon Briones; PB: (Japan) Takeru Kitazono; HB: (Japan) Takeru Kitazono
October 25 – November 03	(Qatar) Doha	World Championships	TF: (United States) United States; AA: (United States) Simone Biles; VT: (United States) Simone Biles; UB: (Belgium) Nina Derwael; BB: (China) Liu Tingting; FX: (United States) Simone Biles	TF: (China) China; AA: (Russia) Artur Dalaloyan; FX: (Russia) Artur Dalaloyan; PH: (China) Xiao Ruoteng; SR: (Greece) Eleftherios Petrounias; VT: (North Korea) Ri Se-gwang; PB: (China) Zou Jingyuan; HB: (Netherlands) Epke Zonderland

=== Regional ===
Date	Location	Event	Winner(s)	
May 6–13	(Namibia) Swakopmund	African Artistic Gymnastics Championships	TF: (Egypt) Egypt; AA: (Egypt) Farah Hussein; VT: (Egypt) Nancy Taman; UB: (South Africa) Caitlin Rooskrantz; BB: (South Africa) Lukisha Schalk; FX: (South Africa) Lukisha Schalk and (South Africa) Gabriella Murray	TF: (Algeria) Algeria; AA: (Egypt) Omar Mohamed; FX: (Egypt) Omar Mohamed; PH: (Algeria) Mohame Aouicha; SR: (Egypt) Ali Zahran; VT: (Tunisia) Mohamed Aziz Trabelsi; PB: (Algeria) Hillal Metidji; HB: (Algeria) Mohamed Reghib
May 26 – June 8	(Bolivia) Cochabamba	South American Games	TF: (Brazil) Brazil; AA: (Argentina) Martina Dominici; VT: (Brazil) Luiza Trautwein; UB: (Brazil) Flavia Saraiva; BB: (Brazil) Flavia Saraiva; FX: (Brazil) Thais Fidelis	TF: (Brazil) Brazil; AA: (Colombia) Jossimar Calvo; FX: (Chile) Tomás González; PH: (Brazil) Francisco Barretto; SR: (Brazil) Arthur Zanetti; VT: (Brazil) Arthur Zanetti; PB: (Colombia) Jossimar Calvo; HB: (Brazil) Caio Souza
July 19 – August 3	(Colombia) Barranquilla	Central American and Caribbean Games	TF: (Cuba) Cuba; AA: (Cuba) Marcia Videaux; VT: (Dominican Republic) Yamilet Pena; UB: (Mexico) Ahtziri Sandoval; BB: (Puerto Rico) Bianca Leon; FX: (Cuba) Marcia Videaux	TF: (Colombia) Colombia; AA: (Cuba) Manrique Larduet; FX: (Guatemala) Jorge Vega; PH: (Colombia) Jossimar Calvo; SR: (Cuba) Manrique Larduet; VT: (Dominican Republic) Audrys Nin Reyes; PB: (Cuba) Manrique Larduet; HB: (Colombia) Jossimar Calvo
August 6–12	(Scotland) Glasgow	European Artistic Gymnastics Championships	TF: Russia; VT: (Hungary) Boglárka Dévai; UB: (Belgium) Nina Derwael; BB: (Netherlands) Sanne Wevers; FX: (France) Mélanie dos Santos	TF: Russia; FX: (United Kingdom) Dominick Cunningham; PH: (Republic of Ireland) Rhys McClenaghan; SR: (Greece) Eleftherios Petrounias; VT: Artur Dalaloyan; PB: Artur Dalaloyan; HB: (Switzerland) Oliver Hegi
September 4–10	(Peru) Lima	Pan American Championships	TF: United States; AA: Grace McCallum; VT: Jade Carey; UB: Grace McCallum; BB: Kara Eaker; FX: Jade Carey	TF: United States; AA: (Cuba) Manrique Larduet; FX: (Chile) Tomás González; PH: Genki Suzuki; SR: (Mexico) Fabián de Luna; VT: (Brazil) Caio Souza; PB: (Cuba) Manrique Larduet; HB: (Brazil) Caio Souza

=== FIG World Cup series ===
Date	Location	Event	Winner(s)	
February 22–25	(Australia) Melbourne	FIG World Cup 2018	VT: (Slovenia) Tjaša Kysselef; UB: (China) Du Siyu; BB: (China) Chen Yile; FX: (Australia) Alexandra Eade	FX: (Japan) Kazuyuki Takeda; PH: (Kazakhstan) Nariman Kurbanov; SR: (China) Ma Yue; VT: (Australia) Christopher Remkes; PB: (China) Wu Xiaoming; HB: (Japan) Hidetaka Miyachi
March 3	(United States) Chicago	American Cup Individual All-Around FIG World Cup 2018	AA: (United States) Morgan Hurd	AA: (United States) Yul Moldauer
March 15–18	(Azerbaijan) Baku	FIG World Cup 2018	VT: (Uzbekistan) Oksana Chusovitina; UB: (China) Lyu Jiaqi; BB: (China) Luo Huan; FX: (Croatia) Ana Đerek	FX: (Japan) Kazuma KayaKazuyuki Takeda; PH: (China) Weng Hao; SR: (Greece) Eleftherios Petrounias; VT: (Belarus) Pavel Bulauski; PB: (Japan) Kenta Chiba; HB: (Netherlands) Bart Deurloo
March 17–18	(Germany) Stuttgart	FIG EnBW DTB-Pokal Individual All-Around World Cup 2018	AA: (China) Zhang Jin	AA: (Russia) David Belyavskiy
March 21–22	(United Kingdom) Birmingham	FIG Individual All-Around World Cup 2018	AA: (Russia) Angelina Melnikova	AA: (Japan) Shogo Nonomura
March 21–24	(Qatar) Doha	FIG World Cup 2018	VT: (Uzbekistan) Oksana Chusovitina; UB: (Belgium) Nina Derwael; BB: (France) Mélanie dos Santos; FX: (Belgium) Axelle Klinckaert and (Italy) Elisa Meneghini and (North Korea) Kim Su-jong	FX: (Russia) Dmitrii LankinKazuyuki Takeda; PH: (China) Zou Jingyuan; SR: (Ukraine) Igor Radivilov; VT: (Ukraine) Igor Radivilov; PB: (China) Zou Jingyuan; HB: (Croatia) Tin Srbić
April 14	(Japan) Tokyo	FIG Individual All-Around World Cup 2018	AA: (Japan) Mai Murakami	AA: (Japan) Kenzo Shirai
May 24–27	(Croatia) Osijek	FIG World Challenge Cup	VT: (Uzbekistan) Oksana Chusovitina; UB: (Ukraine) Diana Varinska; BB: (Ukraine) Diana Varinska; FX: (Ukraine) Diana Varinska	FX: (United Kingdom) Dominick CunninghamKazuyuki Takeda; PH: (Chinese Taipei) Lee Chih Kai; SR: (Russia) Denis Ablyazin; VT: (Israel) Andrey Medvedev; PB: (Cyprus) Marios Georgiou; HB: (Croatia) Tin Srbić
May 31 – June 3	(Slovenia) Koper	FIG World Challenge Cup	VT: (Switzerland) Giulia Steingruber; UB: (Slovakia) Barbora Mokosova; BB: (Netherlands) Céline van Gerner; FX: (Switzerland) Giulia Steingruber	FX: (Japan) Takumi SatoKazuyuki Takeda; PH: (Japan) Kohei Kameyama; SR: (Japan) Kazuyuki Takeda; VT: (Vietnam) Thanh Tung Le; PB: (Vietnam) Phuong Thanh Dinh; HB: (Japan) Takaaki Sugino
June 14–17	(Portugal) Guimarães	FIG World Challenge Cup	VT: (South Korea) Yeo Seojeong; UB: (Mexico) Ahtziri Sandoval; BB: (United Kingdom) Maisie Methuen; FX: (United Kingdom) Maisie Methuen	FX: (Guatemala) Jorge LópezManrique Larduet; PH: (Canada) Thierry Pellerin; SR: (Cuba) Manrique Larduet; VT: (Cuba) Manrique Larduet; PB: (Cuba) Manrique Larduet; HB: (Hungary) Dávid Vecsernyés
July 6–8	(Turkey) Mersin	FIG World Challenge Cup	VT: (India) Dipa Karmakar; UB: (Turkey) Demet Multu; BB: (Turkey) Goksu Uctas Sanli; FX: (Turkey) Goksu Uctas Sanli	FX: (Turkey) Ahmet OnderManrique Larduet; PH: (Republic of Ireland) Rhys McClenaghan; SR: (Turkey) Ibrahim Colak; VT: (Canada) René Cournoyer; PB: (Romania) Andrei Muntean; HB: (Turkey) Ümit Şamiloğlu
September 21–23	(Hungary) Szombathely	FIG World Challenge Cup	VT: (Israel) Ofir Netzer; UB: (Sweden) Jonna Adlerteg; BB: (Hungary) Zsófia Kovács; FX: (Hungary) Dorina Böczögő	FX: (Israel) Artem DolgopyatOleg Verniaiev; PH: (Ukraine) Oleg Verniaiev; SR: (Japan) Shogo Nonomura; VT: (Japan) Keisuke Asato; PB: (Ukraine) Petro Pakhniuk; HB: (Japan) Kenta Chiba
September 29–30	(France) Paris	FIG World Challenge Cup	VT: (Uzbekistan) Oksana Chusovitina; UB: (France) Juliette Bossu; BB: (Canada) Ellie Black; FX: (France) Mélanie de Jesus dos Santos	FX: (Israel) Artem DolgopyatOleg Verniaiev; PH: (France) Cyril Tommasone; SR: (France) Samir Aït Saïd; VT: (France) Loris Frasca; PB: (Japan) Seiya Taura; HB: (Japan) Seiya Taura
November 22–25	(Germany) Cottbus	43rd Turnier der Meister FIG Individual Apparatus World Cup	VT: (Brazil) Rebeca Andrade; UB: (Belgium) Nina Derwael; BB: (Brazil) Rebeca Andrade; FX: (Brazil) Flavia Saraiva	FX: (Israel) Artem DolgopyatOleg Verniaiev; PH: (Chinese Taipei) Lee Chih-Kai; SR: (China) Liu Yang; VT: (Ukraine) Igor Radivilov; PB: (Ukraine) Oleg Verniaiev; HB: (Netherlands) Epke Zonderland

== International medalists ==
=== Women's ===
==== International events ====
Competition	Event	Gold	Silver	Bronze
Pacific Rim	Team	United States	Canada	Australia
Pacific Rim	All-Around	(United States) Grace McCallum	(United States) Morgan Hurd	(Canada) Haley de Jong
Pacific Rim	Vault	(United States) Jordan Chiles	(United States) Grace McCallum	(Canada) Sophie Marois
Pacific Rim	Uneven Bars	(Canada) Haley de Jong	(Mexico) Jimena Moreno	(Australia) Kate McDonald
Pacific Rim	Balance Beam	(Australia) Talia Folino	(Mexico) Paulina Campos	(United States) Jordan Chiles
Pacific Rim	Floor Exercise	(United States) Jordan Chiles	(United States) Grace McCallum	(Canada) Haley de Jong
Youth Olympics	All-Around	(Italy) Giorgia Villa	(United Kingdom) Amelie Morgan	(Ukraine) Anastasia Bachynska
Youth Olympics	Vault	(Italy) Giorgia Villa	(Hungary) Csenge Bácskay	(Canada) Emma Spence
Youth Olympics	Uneven Bars	(Russia) Ksenia Klimenko	(Italy) Giorgia Villa	(China) Tang Xijing
Youth Olympics	Balance Beam	(China) Tang Xijing	(Russia) Ksenia Klimenko	(United Kingdom) Amelie Morgan
Youth Olympics	Floor Exercise	(Italy) Giorgia Villa	(United Kingdom) Amelie Morgan	(Ukraine) Anastasia Bachynska
World Championships	Team	United States	Russia	China
World Championships	All-Around	(United States) Simone Biles	(Japan) Mai Murakami	(United States) Morgan Hurd
World Championships	Vault	(United States) Simone Biles	(Canada) Shallon Olsen	(Mexico) Alexa Moreno
World Championships	Uneven Bars	(Belgium) Nina Derwael	(United States) Simone Biles	(Germany) Elisabeth Seitz
World Championships	Balance Beam	(China) Liu Tingting	(Canada) Ana Padurariu	(United States) Simone Biles
World Championships	Floor Exercise	(United States) Simone Biles	(United States) Morgan Hurd	(Japan) Mai Murakami

==== Regional events ====
Competition	Event	Gold	Silver	Bronze
African Championships	Team	Egypt	South Africa	Algeria
African Championships	All-Around	(Egypt) Farah Hussein	(Egypt) Farah Salem	(South Africa) Angela Maguire
African Championships	Vault	(Egypt) Nancy Taman	(Egypt) Farah Hussein	(South Africa) Gabriella Murray
African Championships	Uneven Bars	(South Africa) Caitlin Rooskrantz	(Egypt) Farah Hussein	(South Africa) Caitlyn Kelly
African Championships	Balance Beam	(South Africa) Lukisha Schalk	(Egypt) Farah Salem	(Egypt) Hana Kassem
African Championships	Floor Exercise	(South Africa) Lukisha Schalk (South Africa) Gabriella Murray	—N/a	(Egypt) Nancy Taman
European Championships	Team	Russia	France	Netherlands
European Championships	Vault	(Hungary) Boglárka Dévai	(Russia) Angelina Melnikova	(Romania) Denisa Golgotă
European Championships	Uneven Bars	(Belgium) Nina Derwael	(Sweden) Jonna Adlerteg	(Russia) Angelina Melnikova
European Championships	Balance Beam	(Netherlands) Sanne Wevers	(Belgium) Nina Derwael	(France) Marine Boyer
European Championships	Floor Exercise	(France) Mélanie dos Santos	(Romania) Denisa Golgotă	(Belgium) Axelle Klinckaert
Pan American Championships	Team	United States	Brazil	Mexico
Pan American Championships	All-Around	(United States) Grace McCallum	(United States) Trinity Thomas	(Brazil) Flavia Saraiva
Pan American Championships	Vault	(United States) Jade Carey	(Cuba) Marcia Vidiaux	(United States) Grace McCallum
Pan American Championships	Uneven Bars	(United States) Grace McCallum	(United States) Trinity Thomas	(Mexico) Nicolle Castro
Pan American Championships	Balance Beam	(United States) Kara Eaker	(Brazil) Flavia Saraiva	(United States) Grace McCallum
Pan American Championships	Floor Exercise	(United States) Jade Carey	(Brazil) Flavia Saraiva	(United States) Kara Eaker

==== Multi-sport events ====
Competition	Event	Gold	Silver	Bronze
Commonwealth Games	Team	Canada	England	Australia
Commonwealth Games	All-Around	(Canada) Elsabeth Black	(Australia) Georgia Godwin	(England) Alice Kinsella
Commonwealth Games	Vault	(Canada) Shallon Olsen	(Canada) Elsabeth Black	(Australia) Emily Whitehead
Commonwealth Games	Uneven Bars	(England) Georgia-Mae Fenton	(Canada) Brittany Rogers	(Australia) Georgia Godwin
Commonwealth Games	Balance Beam	(England) Alice Kinsella	(Australia) Georgia Rose Brown	(England) Kelly Simm
Commonwealth Games	Floor Exercise	(Australia) Alexandra Eade	(Wales) Latalia Bevan	(Canada) Shallon Olsen
South American Games	Team	Brazil	Argentina	Colombia
South American Games	All-Around	(Argentina) Martina Dominici	(Brazil) Flavia Saraiva	(Brazil) Jade Barbosa
South American Games	Vault	(Brazil) Luiza Trautwein	(Argentina) Mayra Vaquie	(Argentina) Martina Dominici
South American Games	Uneven Bars	(Brazil) Flavia Saraiva	(Brazil) Jade Barbosa	(Argentina) Martina Dominici
South American Games	Balance Beam	(Brazil) Flavia Saraiva	(Brazil) Jade Barbosa	(Argentina) Martina Dominici
South American Games	Floor Exercise	(Brazil) Thais Fidelis	(Brazil) Anna Julia Reis	(Argentina) Martina Dominici
Mediterranean Games	Team	Italy	France	Spain
Mediterranean Games	All-Around	(Italy) Lara Mori	(France) Louise Vanhille	(Spain) Ana Perez
Mediterranean Games	Vault	(Egypt) Nancy Taman	(Slovenia) Tjaša Kysselef	(Slovenia) Teja Belak
Mediterranean Games	Uneven Bars	(France) Louise Vanhille	(Spain) Paula Raya	(Slovenia) Lucija Hribar
Mediterranean Games	Balance Beam	(France) Marine Boyer	(Italy) Giada Grisetti	(France) Louise Vanhille
Mediterranean Games	Floor Exercise	(Italy) Lara Mori	(Turkey) Goksu Uctas Sanli	(Spain) Cintia Rodriguez
Central American and Caribbean Games	Team	Cuba	Colombia	Mexico
Central American and Caribbean Games	All-Around	(Cuba) Marcia Videaux	(Puerto Rico) Andrea Maldonado	(Colombia) Dayana Ardila
Central American and Caribbean Games	Vault	(Dominican Republic) Yamilet Pena	(Cuba) Marcia Videaux	(Mexico) Ahtziri Sandoval
Central American and Caribbean Games	Uneven Bars	(Mexico) Ahtziri Sandoval	(Cuba) Marcia Videaux	(Colombia) Laura Pardo
Central American and Caribbean Games	Balance Beam	(Puerto Rico) Bianca Leon	(Mexico) Jimena Moreno	(Colombia) Dayana Ardila
Central American and Caribbean Games	Floor Exercise	(Cuba) Marcia Videaux	(Puerto Rico) Karelys Diaz	(Puerto Rico) Andrea Maldonado

==== FIG World Cup series ====
Competition	Event	Gold	Silver	Bronze
Melbourne	Vault	(Slovenia) Tjaša Kysselef	(Australia) Emily Whitehead	(India) Aruna Budda Reddy
Melbourne	Uneven Bars	(China) Du Siyu	(China) Chen Yile	(Australia) Georgia-Rose Brown
Melbourne	Balance Beam	(China) Chen Yile	(Brazil) Isabel Barbosa	(China) Du Siyu
Melbourne	Floor Exercise	(Australia) Alexandra Eade	(Brazil) Isabel Barbosa	(Slovenia) Tjaša Kysselef
Chicago	All-Around	(United States) Morgan Hurd	(Japan) Mai Murakami	(United States) Maile O'Keefe
Baku	Vault	(Uzbekistan) Oksana Chusovitina	(Azerbaijan) Marina Nekrasova	(Slovenia) Tjaša Kysselef
Baku	Uneven Bars	(China) Lyu Jiaqi	(China) Luo Huan	(Ukraine) Yana Fedorova
Baku	Balance Beam	(China) Luo Huan	(China) Lyu Jiaqi	(Uzbekistan) Oksana Chusovitina
Baku	Floor Exercise	(Croatia) Ana Đerek	(Greece) Ioanna Xoulogi	(Turkey) Demet Mutlu
Stuttgart	All-Around	(China) Zhang Jin	(Germany) Elisabeth Seitz	(United States) Jordan Chiles
Birmingham	All-Around	(Russia) Angelina Melnikova	(United States) Margzetta Frazier	(United Kingdom) Alice Kinsella
Doha	Vault	(Uzbekistan) Oksana Chusovitina	(North Korea) Pyon Rye-yong	(France) Coline Devillard
Doha	Uneven Bars	(Belgium) Nina Derwael	(Russia) Uliana Perebinosova	(France) Mélanie dos Santos
Doha	Balance Beam	(France) Mélanie dos Santos	(France) Marine Boyer	(Belgium) Nina Derwael
Doha	Floor Exercise	(Belgium) Axelle Klinckaert (Italy) Elisa Meneghini (North Korea) Kim Su-jong	—N/a	—N/a
Tokyo	All-Around	(Japan) Mai Murakami	(United States) Trinity Thomas	(France) Mélanie dos Santos
Osijek	Vault	(Uzbekistan) Oksana Chusovitina	(Slovenia) Tjaša Kysselef	(Russia) Victoria Trykina
Osijek	Uneven Bars	(Ukraine) Diana Varinska	(Slovakia) Barbora Mokosova	(Hungary) Noémi Makra
Osijek	Balance Beam	(Ukraine) Diana Varinska	(Slovakia) Barbora Mokosova	(Romania) Laura Iacob
Osijek	Floor Exercise	(Ukraine) Diana Varinska	(Hungary) Zsofia Kovacs	(Romania) Anamaria Ocolișan
Koper	Vault	(Switzerland) Giulia Steingruber	(Romania) Denisa Golgotă	(Slovenia) Tjaša Kysselef
Koper	Uneven Bars	(Slovakia) Barbora Mokosova	(Netherlands) Céline van Gerner	(Hungary) Dorina Boeczoego
Koper	Balance Beam	(Netherlands) Céline van Gerner	(Switzerland) Giulia Steingruber	(Romania) Denisa Golgotă
Koper	Floor Exercise	(Switzerland) Giulia Steingruber	(Romania) Denisa Golgotă	(Slovakia) Barbora Mokosova
Guimarães	Vault	(South Korea) Yeo Seojeong	(Poland) Gabriela Janik	(Mexico) Victoria Mata
Guimarães	Uneven Bars	(Mexico) Ahtziri Sandoval	(Portugal) Filipa Martins	(Spain) Helena Bonilla
Guimarães	Balance Beam	(United Kingdom) Maisie Methuen	(Canada) Laurie Denommee	(Canada) Isabela Onyshko
Guimarães	Floor Exercise	(United Kingdom) Maisie Methuen	(Canada) Isabela Onyshko	(Canada) Laurie Denommee
Mersin	Vault	(India) Dipa Karmakar	(Indonesia) Rifda Irfanaluthfi	(Turkey) Goksu Uctas Sanli
Mersin	Uneven Bars	(Turkey) Demet Multu	(Turkey) Tutya Ylmaz	(Chile) Maria del Sol Perez
Mersin	Balance Beam	(Turkey) Goksu Uctas Sanli	(Turkey) Tutya Ylmaz	(Azerbaijan) Yuliya Inshina
Mersin	Floor Exercise	(Turkey) Goksu Uctas Sanli	(Turkey) Tutya Ylmaz	(Indonesia) Rifda Irfanaluthfi
Szombathely	Vault	(Israel) Ofir Netzer	(Canada) Laurie Denommée	(Czech Republic) Dominika Ponížilová
Szombathely	Uneven Bars	(Sweden) Jonna Adlerteg	(Slovakia) Barbora Mokošová	(Spain) Paula Raya
Szombathely	Balance Beam	(Hungary) Zsófia Kovács	(Spain) Cintia Rodriguez	(Austria) Elisa Haemmerle
Szombathely	Floor Exercise	(Hungary) Dorina Böczögő	(Spain) Cintia Rodriguez	(Slovakia) Barbora Mokošová
Paris	Vault	(Uzbekistan) Oksana Chusovitina	(Canada) Ellie Black	(Slovenia) Tjaša Kysselef
Paris	Uneven Bars	(France) Juliette Bossu	(Sweden) Jonna Adlerteg	(Canada) Ellie Black
Paris	Balance Beam	(Canada) Ellie Black	(France) Marine Boyer	(Spain) Helena Bonilla
Paris	Floor Exercise	(France) Mélanie dos Santos	(Canada) Ellie Black	(Czech Republic) Aneta Holasová
Cottbus	Vault	(Brazil) Rebeca Andrade	(United States) Jade Carey	(India) Dipa Karmakar
Cottbus	Uneven Bars	(Belgium) Nina Derwael	(Brazil) Rebeca Andrade	(China) Lyu Jiaqi
Cottbus	Balance Beam	(Brazil) Rebeca Andrade	(Brazil) Flavia Saraiva	(Ukraine) Diana Varinska
Cottbus	Floor Exercise	(Brazil) Flavia Saraiva	(Brazil) Jade Barbosa	(Poland) Marta Pihan-Kulesza

=== Men's ===
==== International events ====
Competition	Event	Gold	Silver	Bronze
Pacific Rim	Team	United States	Canada	Colombia
Pacific Rim	All-Around	(United States) Sam Mikulak	(United States) Akash Modi	(Colombia) Carlos Calvo
Pacific Rim	Floor Exercise	(United States) Akash Modi	(United States) Sam Mikulak	(Chinese Taipei) Lee Chih Kai
Pacific Rim	Pommel Horse	(United States) Marvin Kimble	(Chinese Taipei) Lee Chih Kai	(Colombia) Carlos Calvo
Pacific Rim	Still Rings	(United States) Sam Mikulak	(United States) Akash Modi	(Canada) Chris Kaji
Pacific Rim	Vault	(Chinese Taipei) Lee Chih Kai	(Peru) Daniel Aguero	(Chinese Taipei) Tseng Wei-Sheng
Pacific Rim	Parallel Bars	(United States) Akash Modi	(United States) Sam Mikulak	(Colombia) Andrés Martínez
Pacific Rim	High Bar	(United States) Sam Mikulak	(Ecuador) Israel Chiriboga	(Colombia) Carlos Calvo
Youth Olympics	All-Around	(Japan) Takeru Kitazono	(Russia) Sergei Naidin	(Brazil) Diogo Soares
Youth Olympics	Floor Exercise	(Japan) Takeru Kitazono	(Hungary) Krisztian Balazs	(Russia) Sergei Naidin
Youth Olympics	Pommel Horse	(China) Dehang Yin	(Russia) Sergei Naidin	(Iran) Reza Bohloulzade Hajlari
Youth Olympics	Still Rings	(Japan) Takeru Kitazono	(Canada) Felix Dolci	(China) Dehang Yin
Youth Olympics	Vault	(United States) Brandon Briones	(Ukraine) Nazar Chepurnyi	(Norway) Jacob Karlsen
Youth Olympics	Parallel Bars	(Japan) Takeru Kitazono	(China) Dehang Yin	(Russia) Sergei Naidin
Youth Olympics	High Bar	(Japan) Takeru Kitazono	(Brazil) Diogo Soares	(Hungary) Krisztian Balazs
World Championships	Team	China	Russia	Japan
World Championships	All-Around	(Russia) Artur Dalaloyan	(China) Xiao Ruoteng	(Russia) Nikita Nagornyy
World Championships	Floor Exercise	(Russia) Artur Dalaloyan	(Japan) Kenzo Shirai	(Philippines) Carlos Yulo
World Championships	Pommel Horse	(China) Xiao Ruoteng	(United Kingdom) Max Whitlock	(Chinese Taipei) Lee Chih-kai
World Championships	Still Rings	(Greece) Eleftherios Petrounias	(Brazil) Arthur Zanetti	(Italy) Marco Lodadio
World Championships	Vault	(North Korea) Ri Se-gwang	(Russia) Artur Dalaloyan	(Japan) Kenzo Shirai
World Championships	Parallel Bars	(China) Zou Jingyuan	(Ukraine) Oleg Verniaiev	(Russia) Artur Dalaloyan
World Championships	High Bar	(Netherlands) Epke Zonderland	(Japan) Kohei Uchimura	(United States) Sam Mikulak

==== Regional events ====
Competition	Event	Gold	Silver	Bronze
African Championships	Team	Algeria	Egypt	Cameroon
African Championships	All-Around	(Egypt) Omar Mohamed	(Algeria) Hillal Metidji	(Egypt) Ahmed El Maraghy
African Championships	Floor Exercise	(Egypt) Omar Mohamed	(Algeria) Ahmed Anis Maoudj	(Algeria) Naimi Mechkour
African Championships	Pommel Horse	(Algeria) Mohame Aouicha	(Tunisia) Wissem Harzi	(Algeria) Hillal Metidji
African Championships	Still Rings	(Egypt) Ali Zahran	(Egypt) Ahmed El Maraghy	(Algeria) Hillal Metidji
African Championships	Vault	(Tunisia) Mohamed Aziz Trabelsi	(Egypt) Omar Mohamed	(Egypt) Ahmed El Maraghy
African Championships	Parallel Bars	(Algeria) Hillal Metidji	(Algeria) Naimi Mechkour	(Egypt) Omar Mohamed
African Championships	High Bar	(Algeria) Mohamed Reghib	(Egypt) Ahmed El Maraghy	(Algeria) Mohame Aouicha
European Championships	Team	Russia	(United Kingdom) Great Britain	France
European Championships	Floor Exercise	(United Kingdom) Dominick Cunningham	(Israel) Artem Dolgopyat	(Russia) Artur Dalaloyan
European Championships	Pommel Horse	(Republic of Ireland) Rhys McClenaghan	(Croatia) Robert Seligman (Slovenia) Sašo Bertoncelj	—N/a
European Championships	Still Rings	(Greece) Eleftherios Petrounias	(Turkey) Ibrahim Çolak	(United Kingdom) Courtney Tulloch
European Championships	Vault	(Russia) Artur Dalaloyan	(Ukraine) Ihor Radivilov	(Russia) Dmitriy Lankin
European Championships	Parallel Bars	(Russia) Artur Dalaloyan	(Russia) David Belyavskiy	(Switzerland) Oliver Hegi
European Championships	High Bar	(Switzerland) Oliver Hegi	(Netherlands) Epke Zonderland	(Hungary) Dávid Vecsernyés
Pan American Championships	Team	United States	Colombia	Brazil
Pan American Championships	All-Around	(Cuba) Manrique Larduet	(Canada) René Cournoyer	(United States) Cameron Bock
Pan American Championships	Floor Exercise	(Chile) Tomás González	(Cuba) Manrique Larduet	(United States) Cameron Bock
Pan American Championships	Pommel Horse	(United States) Genki Suzuki	(Cuba) Manrique Larduet	(United States) Cameron Bock
Pan American Championships	Still Rings	(Mexico) Fabian De Luna	(Argentina) Federico Molinari	(Argentina) Daniel Villafañe
Pan American Championships	Vault	(Brazil) Caio Souza	(Peru) Daniel Aguero	(Colombia) David Toro
Pan American Championships	Parallel Bars	(Cuba) Manrique Larduet	(Colombia) Jossimar Calvo	(United States) Cameron Bock
Pan American Championships	High Bar	(Brazil) Caio Souza	(Brazil) Francisco Barretto	(Cuba) Randy Lerú

==== Multi-sport events ====
Competition	Event	Gold	Silver	Bronze
Commonwealth Games	Team	England	Canada	Scotland
Commonwealth Games	All-Around	(England) Nile Wilson	(England) James Hall	(Cyprus) Marios Georgiou
Commonwealth Games	Floor Exercise	(Cyprus) Marios Georgiou	(Canada) Scott Morgan	(Scotland) Daniel Purvis
Commonwealth Games	Pommel Horse	(Northern Ireland) Rhys McClenaghan	(England) Max Whitlock	(Canada) Zachary Clay
Commonwealth Games	Still Rings	(England) Courtney Tulloch	(England) Nile Wilson	(Canada) Scott Morgan
Commonwealth Games	Vault	(Australia) Christopher Remkes	(England) Courtney Tulloch	(England) Dominick Cunningham
Commonwealth Games	Parallel Bars	(Cyprus) Marios Georgiou	(England) Nile Wilson	(Scotland) Frank Baines
Commonwealth Games	High Bar	(England) Nile Wilson	(Canada) Cory Paterson (England) James Hall	—N/a
South American Games	Team	Brazil	Colombia	Argentina
South American Games	All-Around	(Colombia) Jossimar Calvo	(Brazil) Caio Souza	(Brazil) Francisco Barretto
South American Games	Floor Exercise	(Chile) Tomás González	(Colombia) Andrés Martínez	(Argentina) Julian Ezequiel Jato
South American Games	Pommel Horse	(Brazil) Francisco Barretto	(Brazil) Péricles Da Silva	(Colombia) Javier Sandoval
South American Games	Still Rings	(Brazil) Arthur Zanetti	(Argentina) Federico Molinari	(Brazil) Caio Souza
South American Games	Vault	(Brazil) Arthur Zanetti	(Uruguay) Victor Rostagno	(Peru) Daniel Aguero
South American Games	Parallel Bars	(Colombia) Jossimar Calvo	(Brazil) Caio Souza	(Colombia) Javier Sandoval
South American Games	High Bar	(Brazil) Caio Souza	(Colombia) Javier Sandoval	(Brazil) Francisco Barretto
Mediterranean Games	Team	Spain	Turkey	France
Mediterranean Games	All-Around	(Cyprus) Marios Georgiou	(France) Julien Gobaux	(Turkey) Ahmet Onder
Mediterranean Games	Floor Exercise	(Spain) Rayderley Zapata	(Turkey) Ahmet Onder	(Slovenia) Rok Klavora
Mediterranean Games	Pommel Horse	(France) Cyril Tommasone	(Croatia) Robert Seligman	(Cyprus) Marios Georgiou
Mediterranean Games	Still Rings	(Turkey) Ibrahim Colak	(Italy) Marco Lodadio	(Egypt) Ali Zahran
Mediterranean Games	Vault	(France) Loris Frasca	(Turkey) Ahmet Onder	(Turkey) Ferhat Arıcan
Mediterranean Games	Parallel Bars	(Turkey) Ahmet Onder	(Cyprus) Marios Georgiou	(France) Julien Gobaux
Mediterranean Games	High Bar	(Cyprus) Marios Georgiou	(Turkey) Ümit Şamiloğlu	(Spain) Néstor Abad
Central American and Caribbean Games	Team	Colombia	Cuba	Mexico
Central American and Caribbean Games	All-Around	(Cuba) Manrique Larduet	(Cuba) Randy Lerú	(Dominican Republic) Audrys Nin Reyes
Central American and Caribbean Games	Floor Exercise	(Guatemala) Jorge López	(Colombia) Jossimar Calvo	(Cuba) Randy Lerú
Central American and Caribbean Games	Pommel Horse	(Colombia) Jossimar Calvo	(Cuba) Manrique Larduet	(Dominican Republic) Audrys Nin Reyes
Central American and Caribbean Games	Still Rings	(Cuba) Manrique Larduet	(Mexico) Fabian De Luna	(Colombia) Jossimar Calvo
Central American and Caribbean Games	Vault	(Dominican Republic) Audrys Nin Reyes	(Cuba) Manrique Larduet	(Guatemala) Jorge López
Central American and Caribbean Games	Parallel Bars	(Cuba) Manrique Larduet	(Colombia) Jossimar Calvo	(Colombia) Javier Sandoval
Central American and Caribbean Games	High Bar	(Colombia) Jossimar Calvo	(Cuba) Randy Lerú	(Cuba) Manrique Larduet

==== FIG World Cup series ====
Competition	Event	Gold	Silver	Bronze
Melbourne	Floor Exercise	(Japan) Kazuyuki Takeda	(China) Ge Shihao	(Lithuania) Robert Tvorogal
Melbourne	Pommel Horse	(Kazakhstan) Nariman Kurbanov	(Chinese Taipei) Lee Chih Kai	(Australia) Christopher Remkes
Melbourne	Still Rings	(China) Ma Yue	(China) Wu Guanhua	(Japan) Kazuyuki Takeda
Melbourne	Vault	(Australia) Christopher Remkes	(Chinese Taipei) Lee Chih Kai	(Philippines) Carlos Edriel Yulo
Melbourne	Parallel Bars	(China) Wu Xiaoming	(China) Tan Di	(Australia) Michael Mercieca
Melbourne	High Bar	(Japan) Hidetaka Miyachi	(Australia) Mitchell Morgans	(Australia) Michael Mercieca
Chicago	All-Around	(United States) Yul Moldauer	(United Kingdom) James Hall	(Ukraine) Petro Pakhniuk
Baku	Floor Exercise	(Japan) Kazuma Kaya	(Ukraine) Volodymyr Hrybuk	(Slovenia) Rok Klavora
Baku	Pommel Horse	(China) Weng Hao	(Chinese Taipei) Lee Chih Kai	(Japan) Takaaki Sugino
Baku	Still Rings	(Greece) Eleftherios Petrounias	(Turkey) Ibrahim Colak	(China) Lan Xingyu
Baku	Vault	(Belarus) Pavel Bulauski	(Philippines) Carlos Edriel Yulo	(Georgia (country)) Konstantin Kuzovkov
Baku	Parallel Bars	(Japan) Kenta Chiba	(Belarus) Andrey Likhovitskiy	(Turkey) Ferhat Arıcan
Baku	High Bar	(Netherlands) Bart Deurloo	(Belarus) Andrey Likhovitskiy	(Croatia) Anton Kovacevic
Stuttgart	All-Around	(Russia) David Belyavskiy	(United States) Akash Modi	(Japan) Yusuke Tanaka
Birmingham	All-Around	(Japan) Shogo Nonomura	(Russia) Nikita Nagornyy	(United Kingdom) James Hall
Doha	Floor Exercise	(Russia) Dmitrii Lankin	(Philippines) Carlos Edriel Yulo	(Japan) Ryohei Kato
Doha	Pommel Horse	(China) Zou Jingyuan	(Chinese Taipei) Lee Chih Kai	(United States) Alec Yoder
Doha	Still Rings	(Ukraine) Igor Radivilov	(Turkey) Ibrahim Colak	(China) Zou Jingyuan
Doha	Vault	(Ukraine) Igor Radivilov	(China) Qu Ruiyang	(Turkey) Ferhat Arıcan
Doha	Parallel Bars	(China) Zou Jingyuan	(China) Xiao Ruoteng	(Turkey) Ferhat Arıcan
Doha	High Bar	(Croatia) Tin Srbić	(United States) Marvin Kimble	(China) Deng Shudi
Tokyo	All-Around	(Japan) Kenzo Shirai	(Japan) Wataru Tanigawa	(United States) Sam Mikulak
Osijek	Floor Exercise	(United Kingdom) Dominick Cunningham	(Israel) Artem Dolgopyat	(Italy) Nicola Bartolini
Osijek	Pommel Horse	(Chinese Taipei) Lee Chih Kai	(Kazakhstan) Akim Mussayev	(Belarus) Vasili Mikhalitsyn
Osijek	Still Rings	(Russia) Denis Ablyazin	(Turkey) Ibrahim Colak	(Egypt) Ali Zahran
Osijek	Vault	(Israel) Andrey Medvedev	(United Kingdom) Dominick Cunningham	(Italy) Nicola Bartolini
Osijek	Parallel Bars	(Cyprus) Marios Georgiou	(Turkey) Sercan Demir	(Dominican Republic) Audrys Nin Reyes
Osijek	High Bar	(Croatia) Tin Srbić	(Lithuania) Robert Tvorogal	(Switzerland) Taha Serhani
Koper	Floor Exercise	(Japan) Takumi Sato	(Israel) Artem Dolgopyat	(Switzerland) Benjamin Gischard
Koper	Pommel Horse	(Japan) Kohei Kameyama	(Kazakhstan) Nariman Kurbanov	(Slovenia) Saso Bernoncelj
Koper	Still Rings	(Japan) Kazuyuki Takeda	(Turkey) Ibrahim Colak	(Italy) Marco Lodadio
Koper	Vault	(Vietnam) Thanh Tung Le	(Japan) Takumi Sato	(Switzerland) Benjamin Gischard
Koper	Parallel Bars	(Vietnam) Phuong Thanh Dinh	(Romania) Andrei Muntean	(Italy) Mateo Levantesi
Koper	High Bar	(Japan) Takaaki Sugino	(Dominican Republic) Audrys Nin Reyes	(Brazil) Gustavo Polato
Guimarães	Floor Exercise	(Guatemala) Jorge López	(Japan) Takumi Sato	(Spain) Rayderley Zapata
Guimarães	Pommel Horse	(Canada) Thierry Pellerin	(Hungary) Zoltán Kállai	(Japan) Koki Maeda
Guimarães	Still Rings	(Cuba) Manrique Larduet	(Romania) Andrei Muntean	(Japan) Kentaro Yunoki
Guimarães	Vault	(Cuba) Manrique Larduet	(Guatemala) Jorge Vega Lopez	(Japan) Takumi Sato
Guimarães	Parallel Bars	(Cuba) Manrique Larduet	(Romania) Andrei Muntean	(Switzerland) Henji Mboyo
Guimarães	High Bar	(Hungary) Dávid Vecsernyés	(Cuba) Randy Lerú	(Mexico) Kevin Cerda
Mersin	Floor Exercise	(Turkey) Ahmet Onder	(United Kingdom) Frank Baines	(Turkey) Ferhat Arıcan
Mersin	Pommel Horse	(Republic of Ireland) Rhys McClenaghan	(United Kingdom) Frank Baines	(Canada) Justin Karstadt
Mersin	Still Rings	(Turkey) Ibrahim Colak	(Romania) Andrei Muntean	(Netherlands) Yuri van Gelder
Mersin	Vault	(Canada) René Cournoyer	(Bulgaria) Dimitar Dimitrov	(Romania) Robert Ghiuzan
Mersin	Parallel Bars	(Romania) Andrei Muntean	(Turkey) Ahmet Onder	(Turkey) Ferhat Arıcan
Mersin	High Bar	(Turkey) Ümit Şamiloğlu	(Canada) Samuel Zakutney	(United Kingdom) Frank Baines
Szombathely	Floor Exercise	(Israel) Artem Dolgopyat	(Ukraine) Oleg Verniaiev	(Spain) Joel Plata
Szombathely	Pommel Horse	(Ukraine) Oleg Verniaiev	(Slovenia) Sašo Bertoncelj	(Japan) Shogo Nonomura
Szombathely	Still Rings	(Japan) Shogo Nonomura	(Egypt) Ali Zahran	(Japan) Kenta Chiba
Szombathely	Vault	(Japan) Keisuke Asato	(Vietnam) Le Thanh Tung	(Ukraine) Oleg Verniaiev
Szombathely	Parallel Bars	(Ukraine) Petro Pakhniuk	(Japan) Kenta Chiba	(Ukraine) Oleg Verniaiev
Szombathely	High Bar	(Japan) Kenta Chiba	(Hungary) David Vecsernyes	(Cyprus) Marios Georgiou
Paris	Floor Exercise	(Israel) Artem Dolgopyat	(Guatemala) Jorge Vega Lopez	(Spain) Rayderley Zapata
Paris	Pommel Horse	(France) Cyril Tommasone	(Canada) Thierry Pellerin	(Slovenia) Sašo Bertoncelj
Paris	Still Rings	(France) Samir Aït Saïd	(Ukraine) Igor Radivilov	(Russia) Denis Ablyazin
Paris	Vault	(France) Loris Frasca	(Israel) Andrey Medvedev	(Morocco) Hamza Hossaini
Paris	Parallel Bars	(Japan) Seiya Taura	(France) Julien Gobaux	(Turkey) Ahmet Onder
Paris	High Bar	(Japan) Seiya Taura	(Hungary) David Vecsernyes	(Spain) Néstor Abad
Cottbus	Floor Exercise	(Israel) Artem Dolgopyat	(Netherlands) Casimir Schmidt	(Philippines) Carlos Yulo
Cottbus	Pommel Horse	(Chinese Taipei) Lee Chih-kai	(China) Weng Hao	(Iran) Saeid Reza Keikha
Cottbus	Still Rings	(China) Liu Yang	(France) Samir Aït Saïd	(China) You Hao
Cottbus	Vault	(Ukraine) Igor Radivilov	(China) Mingqi Huang	(France) Loris Frasca
Cottbus	Parallel Bars	(Ukraine) Oleg Verniaiev	(Russia) Dmitrii Lankin	(Turkey) Ferhat Arıcan
Cottbus	High Bar	(Netherlands) Epke Zonderland	(Croatia) Tin Srbić	(Japan) Hidetaka Miyachi

== Season's best international scores ==
Only the scores of senior gymnasts from international events have been included below; one score per gymnast. Finalists at the 2018 Artistic Gymnastics World Championships are highlighted in green.

=== Women's ===
==== All-around ====
Rank	Name	Country	Score	Event
1	Simone Biles	United States	60.965	World Championships QF
2	Grace McCallum	United States	57.000	Pan American Championships TF
3	Morgan Hurd	United States	56.599	American Cup
4	Mai Murakami	Japan	56.532	Tokyo World Cup
5	Mélanie de Jesus dos Santos	France	56.432	European Championships TF
6	Chen Yile	China	55.950	Asian Games QF/AA
7	Emma Malabuyo	United States	55.868	City of Jesolo Trophy TF/AA
8	Nina Derwael	Belgium	55.699	World Championships AA
9	Angelina Melnikova	Russia	55.698	World Championships AA
10	Ragan Smith	United States	55.166	City of Jesolo Trophy TF/AA
11	Elsabeth Black	Canada	55.031	World Championships TF
12	Riley McCusker	United States	54.765	World Championships QF
13	Anastasia Ilyankova	Russia	54.567	City of Jesolo Trophy TF/AA
14	Luo Huan	China	54.550	Asian Games QF/AA
15	Trinity Thomas	United States	54.533	Tokyo World Cup
16	Flavia Saraiva	Brazil	54.366	World Championships AA
17	Maile O’Keefe	United States	54.365	American Cup
18	Asuka Teramoto	Japan	54.299	World Championships AA
19	Ellie Downie	(United Kingdom) Great Britain	54.233	World Championships AA
20	Margzetta Frazier	United States	53.932	Birmingham World Cup

==== Vault ====
Rank	Name	Country	Score	Event
1	Simone Biles	United States	15.666	World Championships QF
2	Rebeca Andrade	Brazil	14.766	Cottbus World Cup QF
3	Boglárka Dévai	Hungary	14.616	European Championships QF
4	Shallon Olsen	Canada	14.600	Commonwealth Games TF/QF
5	Jade Carey	United States	14.550	Pan American Championships AA/EF
6	Alexa Moreno	Mexico	14.508	World Championships EF
7	Giulia Steingruber	Switzerland	14.500	Koper Challenge Cup EF
8	Yeo Seo-jeong	South Korea	14.483	World Championships QF
9	Oksana Chusovitina	Uzbekistan	14.433	Doha World Cup EF
10	Pyon Rye-yong	North Korea	14.383	Doha World Cup EF
11	Yamilet Pena	Dominican Republic	14.375	Central American and Caribbean Games TF/QF
12	Elsabeth Black	Canada	14.350	Paris Challenge Cup QF
12	Angelina Melnikova	Russia	14.350	City of Jesolo Trophy TF/QF
14	Dipa Karmakar	India	14.316	Cottbus World Cup EF
15	Jordan Chiles	United States	14.300	Pacific Rim TF/AA
16	Liu Jinru	China	14.283	City of Jesolo Trophy EF
17	Brittany Rogers	Canada	14.250	Commonwealth Games TF/QF
18	Marcia Vidiaux	Cuba	14.234	Pan American Championships AA/EF
19	Eleonora Afanasyeva	Russia	14.217	City of Jesolo Trophy EF
20	Marina Nekrasova	Azerbaijan	14.216	Baku World Cup EF

==== Uneven bars ====
Rank	Name	Country	Score	Event
1	Nina Derwael	Belgium	15.300	Doha World Cup EF
2	Fan Yilin	China	15.233	Cottbus World Cup QF
3	Simone Biles	United States	14.866	World Championships QF
4	Liu Tingting	China	14.850	Asian Games QF
5	Lyu Jiaqi	China	14.833	Baku World Cup EF
6	Elisabeth Seitz	Germany	14.800	Stuttgart World Cup
7	Georgia-Mae Fenton	United Kingdom	14.600	Commonwealth Games EF
7	Anastasia Iliankova	Russia	14.600	City of Jesolo Trophy EF
7	Morgan Hurd	United States	14.600	Pacific Rim TF/AA
7	Jonna Adlerteg	Sweden	14.600	European Championships QF
7	Luo Huan	China	14.600	Asian Games QF
12	Ragan Smith	United States	14.567	City of Jesolo Trophy EF
13	Uliana Perebinosova	Russia	14.566	Doha World Cup EF
14	Grace McCallum	United States	14.533	Pan American Championships AA/EF
15	Riley McCusker	United States	14.500	World Championships TF
15	Aliya Mustafina	Russia	14.500	World Championships TF
15	Rebeca Andrade	Brazil	14.500	Cottbus World Cup EF
18	Trinity Thomas	United States	14.433	Pan American Championships AA/EF
19	Kim Bui	Germany	14.400	DTB Pokal TF
19	Mélanie de Jesus dos Santos	France	14.400	Doha World Cup QF
19	Becky Downie	United Kingdom	14.400	World Championships QF

==== Balance beam ====
Rank	Name	Country	Score	Event
1	Simone Biles	United States	14.800	World Championships QF
1	Chen Yile	China	14.800	Asian Games QF
3	Flávia Saraiva	Brazil	14.667	Pan American Championships TF
4	Kara Eaker	United States	14.600	Pan American Championships TF
5	Liu Tingting	China	14.533	World Championships EF
6	Zhang Jin	China	14.450	Asian Games QF
7	Emma Malabuyo	United States	14.300	City of Jesolo Trophy EF
7	Grace McCallum	United States	14.300	Pan American Championships TF
9	Marine Boyer	France	14.250	Paris Challenge Cup QF
10	Ragan Smith	United States	14.200	City of Jesolo Trophy EF
11	Ana Padurariu	Canada	14.100	World Championships EF
12	Sanne Wevers	Netherlands	14.033	World Championships QF
13	Mélanie de Jesus dos Santos	France	13.933	Doha World Cup EF
14	Elsabeth Black	Canada	13.900	Paris Challenge Cup EF
15	Morgan Hurd	United States	13.800	American Cup
15	Lara Mori	Italy	13.800	Mediterranean Games AA
17	Nina Derwael	Belgium	13.766	World Championships QF
17	Mai Murakami	Japan	13.766	World Championships TF
17	Rebeca Andrade	Brazil	13.766	Cottbus World Cup EF
20	Riley McCusker	United States	13.733	World Championships TF

==== Floor exercise ====
Rank	Name	Country	Score	
1	Simone Biles	United States	15.333	World Championships QF
2	Jade Carey	United States	14.600	Pan American Championships TF
3	Mai Murakami	Japan	14.566	Tokyo World Cup
4	Flávia Saraiva	Brazil	14.233	Pan American Championships TF
5	Emma Malabuyo	United States	14.167	City of Jesolo Trophy EF
6	Taeja James	(United Kingdom) Great Britain	14.100	Commonwealth Games TF/QF
7	Morgan Hurd	United States	14.033	American Cup
7	Angelina Melnikova	Russia	14.033	World Championships QF
9	Grace McCallum	United States	14.000	Pan American Championships TF
10	Mélanie de Jesus dos Santos	France	13.966	European Championships TF
11	Marcia Videaux	Cuba	13.900	Central American and Caribbean Games TF/QF
12	Kara Eaker	United States	13.767	Pan American Championships AA/EF
13	Jordan Chiles	United States	13.650	Pacific Rim EF
14	Lara Mori	Italy	13.600	Mediterranean Games EF
14	Denisa Golgotă	Romania	13.600	European Championships EF
14	Lilia Akhaimova	Russia	13.600	World Championships QF
17	Jade Barbosa	Brazil	13.550	Cottbus World Cup EF
18	Ana Derek	Croatia	13.533	Baku World Cup EF
19	Alexandra Eade	Australia	13.500	Melbourne World Cup QF
19	Laurie Denommée	Canada	13.500	Pan American Championships TF
19	Rune Hermans	Belgium	13.500	Doha World Cup QF
19	Brooklyn Moors	Canada	13.500	World Championships QF

=== Men's ===
==== All-around ====
Rank	Name	Country	Score	Event
1	Sam Mikulak	United States	87.700	Pacific Rim TF/AA
2	Artur Dalaloyan	Russia	87.598	World Championships AA
2	Xiao Ruoteng	China	87.598	World Championships AA
4	Nikita Nagornyy	Russia	87.098	World Championships QF
5	Nile Wilson	England	86.100	Commonwealth Games TF/QF
6	Kenzo Shirai	Japan	86.064	Tokyo World Cup
7	Yul Moldauer	United States	85.964	American Cup
8	Sun Wei	China	85.898	World Championships AA
9	David Belyavskiy	Russia	85.732	Stuttgart World Cup
10	Néstor Abad	Spain	85.600	Mediterranean Games QF/TF
11	Jossimar Calvo	Colombia	84.950	Central American and Caribbean Games TF/QF
12	James Hall	England	84.850	Commonwealth Games TF/QF
13	Manrique Larduet	Cuba	84.800	Central American and Caribbean Games AA
14	Shogo Nonomura	Japan	84.797	Birmingham World Cup
15	Kazuma Kaya	Japan	84.765	World Championships AA
16	Marios Georgiou	Cyprus	84.750	Commonwealth Games AA
17	Ahmet Onder	Turkey	84.550	Mediterranean Games QF/TF
18	Wataru Tanigawa	Japan	84.399	Tokyo World Cup
19	Akash Modi	United States	84.098	Stuttgart World Cup
20	Yusuke Tanaka	Japan	83.998	Stuttgart World Cup

==== Floor exercise ====
Rank	Name	Country	Score	Event
1	Kenzo Shirai	Japan	15.200	Tokyo World Cup
1	Kirill Prokopev	Russia	15.200	Osijek Challenge Cup QF
3	Artem Dolgopyat	Israel	15.100	DTB Pokal AA/QF
4	Takumi Sato	Japan	14.950	Koper Challenge Cup EF
5	Artur Dalaloyan	Russia	14.900	World Championships EF
6	Dominick Cunningham	(United Kingdom) Great Britain	14.867	Osijek Challenge Cup EF
7	Max Whitlock	England	14.800	Commonwealth Games TF/QF
7	Nikita Nagornyy	Russia	14.800	World Championships QF
9	Carlos Yulo	Philippines	14.766	World Championships QF
10	Dmitrii Lankin	Russia	14.733	Doha World Cup EF
11	Yul Moldauer	United States	14.666	American Cup
12	Hamish Carter	Scotland	14.600	Commonwealth Games AA
12	Tomas Kuzmickas	Lithuania	14.600	Osijek Challenge Cup QF
12	Nicola Bartolini	Italy	14.600	Osijek Challenge Cup EF
15	Frank Baines	Scotland	14.550	Commonwealth Games AA
15	Nikita Ignatyev	Russia	14.550	DTB Pokal AA/QF
15	Andrew Smith	(Republic of Ireland) Ireland	14.550	Mersin Challenge Cup QF
18	Rayderley Zapata	Spain	14.533	European Championships QF
18	Ahmet Önder	Turkey	14.533	World Championships QF
20	Wataru Tanigawa	Japan	14.500	Tokyo World Cup
20	Yusuke Tanaka	Japan	14.500	Stuttgart World Cup
20	Daisuke Fudono	Japan	14.500	DTB Pokal TF
20	Néstor Abad	Spain	14.500	Mediterranean Games QF/TF

==== Pommel Horse ====
Rank	Name	Country	Score	Event
1	Lee Chih Kai	Chinese Taipei	15.400	Asian Games EF
2	Rhys McClenaghan	(Republic of Ireland) Ireland	15.300	European Championships EF
3	Weng Hao	China	15.266	Baku World Cup QF
4	Max Whitlock	(United Kingdom) Great Britain	15.233	World Championships TF
5	Xiao Ruoteng	China	15.166	World Championships EF
6	Sam Mikulak	United States	15.150	Pacific Rim TF/AA
7	Zou Jingyuan	China	15.100	Doha World Cup QF
8	Cyril Tommasone	France	15.033	Mediterranean Games EF
9	David Belyavskiy	Russia	15.000	European Championships QF
9	Kohei Kameyama	Japan	15.000	Melbourne World Cup QF
11	Robert Seligman	Croatia	14.966	Mediterranean Games EF
12	Nariman Kurbanov	Kazakhstan	14.933	Melbourne World Cup EF
13	Sašo Bertoncelj	Slovenia	14.866	European Championships EF
14	Marvin Kimble	United States	14.825	Pacific Rim EF
15	Takaaki Sugino	Japan	14.800	Koper Challenge Cup QF
16	Saeid Reza Keikha	Iran	14.766	Baku World Cup QF
16	Filip Ude	Croatia	14.766	European Championships QF
16	Sun Wei	China	14.766	World Championships AA
19	Alec Yoder	United States	14.700	Doha World Cup EF
19	Nikolai Kuksenkov	Russia	14.700	European Championships QF

==== Still Rings ====
Rank	Name	Country	Score	Event
1	Eleftherios Petrounias	Greece	15.466	European Championships EF
2	Igor Radivilov	Ukraine	15.266	Doha World Cup EF
3	Arthur Zanetti	Brazil	15.250	DTB Pokal AA/QF
4	Ibrahim Colak	Turkey	15.233	Mediterranean Games EF
5	Courtney Tulloch	England	15.200	Commonwealth Games TF/QF
6	Denis Ablyazin	Russia	15.067	Osijek Challenge Cup EF
7	Zou Jingyuan	China	14.966	Doha World Cup EF
8	Kazuyuki Takeda	Japan	14.950	Koper Challenge Cup EF
8	Marco Lodadio	Italy	14.950	Koper Challenge Cup EF
10	Wu Guanhua	China	14.933	Melbourne World Cup QF
11	Nikita Nagornyy	Russia	14.900	Birmingham World Cup
12	Artur Tovmasyan	Armenia	14.866	World Championships QF
13	Vahagn Davtyan	Armenia	14.833	European Championships QF
14	Shogo Nonomura	Japan	14.800	Birmingham World Cup
15	Andrei Muntean	Romania	14.766	Doha World Cup QF
15	Dennis Goossens	Belgium	14.766	European Championships QF
17	Nile Wilson	England	14.750	Commonwealth Games TF/QF
18	Ali Zahran	Egypt	14.733	Mediterranean Games EF
19	Ma Yue	China	14.666	Melbourne World Cup QF
19	Marcel Nguyen	Germany	14.666	European Championships QF

==== Vault ====
Rank	Name	Country	Score	Event
1	Ri Se-gwang	North Korea	14.966	World Championships QF
2	Dominick Cunningham	England	14.950	Commonwealth Games TF/QF
2	Courtney Tulloch	England	14.950	Commonwealth Games TF/QF
4	Artur Dalaloyan	Russia	14.900	European Championships EF
5	Christopher Remkes	Australia	14.875	Commonwealth Games TF/QF
6	Andrey Medvedev	Israel	14.849	European Championships QF
7	Denis Ablyazin	Russia	14.867	Osijek Challenge Cup QF
8	Igor Radivilov	Ukraine	14.866	European Championships EF
9	Artur Davtyan	Armenia	14.750	World Championships QF
10	Loris Frasca	France	14.716	Mediterranean Games EF
11	Nikita Nagornyy	Russia	14.683	World Championships QF
12	Manrique Larduet	Cuba	14.675	Guimarães Challenge Cup EF
12	Alberto Leyva	Cuba	14.675	Central American and Caribbean Games TF/QF
14	Dmitrii Lankin	Russia	14.666	European Championships EF
15	Huang Mingqi	China	14.616	Doha World Cup QF
16	Thanh Tung Le	Vietnam	14.600	Koper Challenge Cup EF
16	Audrys Nin Reyes	Dominican Republic	14.600	Central American and Caribbean Games EF
18	Ahmet Onder	Turkey	14.583	Mediterranean Games EF
18	Caio Souza	Brazil	14.583	World Championships QF
20	Jorge Vega	Guatemala	14.575	Guimarães Challenge Cup EF

==== Parallel Bars ====
Rank	Name	Country	Score	Event
1	Zou Jingyuan	China	16.266	Doha World Cup QF
2	Oleg Verniaiev	Ukraine	15.666	World Championships AA
3	Artur Dalaloyan	Russia	15.566	World Championships AA
4	David Belyavskiy	Russia	15.533	European Championships QF
5	Sam Mikulak	United States	15.441	World Championships AA
6	Xiao Ruoteng	China	15.333	World Championships AA
7	Manrique Larduet	Cuba	15.300	Guimarães Challenge Cup QF
8	Jossimar Calvo	Colombia	15.275	South American Games EF
9	Nikita Nagornyy	Russia	15.266	European Championships QF
9	Lin Chaopan	China	15.266	World Championships QF
11	Joe Fraser	(United Kingdom) Great Britain	15.233	European Championships TF
12	Ferhat Arıcan	Turkey	15.166	Doha World Cup EF
12	Vladislav Poliashov	Russia	15.166	DTB Pokal TF
14	Yusuke Tanaka	Japan	15.133	Stuttgart World Cup
15	Đinh Phương Thành	Vietnam	15.100	Koper Challenge Cup QF
16	Shogo Nonomura	Japan	15.066	Birmingham World Cup
17	Ahmet Onder	Turkey	15.033	Mediterranean Games EF
18	Marcel Nguyen	Germany	15.000	Birmingham World Cup
19	Oliver Hegi	Switzerland	15.000	European Championships TF
20	Petro Pakhniuk	Ukraine	14.933	American Cup
20	Marios Georgiou	Cyprus	14.933	Mediterranean Games EF
20	Lukas Dauser	Germany	14.933	World Championships QF

==== High Bar ====
Rank	Name	Country	Score	Event
1	Nile Wilson	England	15.100	Commonwealth Games TF/QF
2	Sam Mikulak	United States	15.000	Pacific Rim EF
3	Xiao Ruoteng	China	14.833	Doha World Cup QF
4	Tin Srbić	Croatia	14.800	Doha World Cup EF
5	Tang Chia-hung	Chinese Taipei	14.725	Asian Games EF
6	Oliver Hegi	Switzerland	14.700	European Championships EF
7	Manrique Larduet	Cuba	14.650	Central American and Caribbean Games TF/QF
8	Hidetaka Miyachi	Japan	14.600	Melbourne World Cup EF
8	Kenya Yuasa	Japan	14.600	DTB Pokal AA/QF
8	Kohei Uchimura	Japan	14.600	World Championships QF
11	Yusuke Tanaka	Japan	14.566	Stuttgart World Cup
12	Sergei Eltcov	Russia	14.550	DTB Pokal AA/QF
13	Edgar Boulet	France	14.533	Doha World Cup QF
13	Marvin Kimble	United States	14.533	Doha World Cup EF
13	Andreas Bretschneider	Germany	14.533	Stuttgart World Cup
16	Deng Shudi	China	14.500	Doha World Cup EF
17	James Hall	England	14.450	Commonwealth Games TF/QF
17	Francisco Barretto	Brazil	14.450	DTB Pokal AA/QF
17	Randy Lerú	Cuba	14.450	Central American and Caribbean Games TF/QF
20	David Belyavskiy	Russia	14.400	Stuttgart World Cup
20	Epke Zonderland	Netherlands	14.400	European Championships EF
