= Giuliana Cusnier =

Puerto Rican rhythmic gymnast (born 2002)

- Born: 11 April 2002 (age 24) Fajardo, Puerto Rico

Gymnastics career
- Discipline: Rhythmic gymnastics
- Country represented: Puerto Rico; (2017-)
- Head coach: Elena Nikolashkina
Medal record
Representing Puerto Rico
Rhythmic Gymnastics
Central American and Caribbean Games
Bronze medal – third place	2018 Barranquilla	Clubs
Bronze medal – third place	2018 Barranquilla	Ribbon
Bronze medal – third place	2023 San Salvador	Team

Giuliana Andrea Cusnier Palermo (born 11 April 2002) is a Puerto Rican rhythmic gymnast and beauty pageant titleholder. She won multiple medals at the Central American and Caribbean Games. She also competed at Miss Universe Puerto Rico 2024 on June 27, 2024 where she placed top 10.

== Career ==
At the 2017 Pan American Rhythmic Gymnastics Championships she was 12th in the All-Around, 13th with hoop, 11th with ball, 14th with clubs and 20th with ribbon.

In 2018, at the World Cup in Portimão she was 29th in the All-Around, 28th with hoop, 30th with ball, 29th with clubs and 24th with ribbon. In the summer she took part in the Central American and Caribbean Games where she won bronze with clubs and ribbon. At her maiden World Championships in Sofia she ended 50th in the All-Around, 86th with hoop, 86th with ball, 70th with clubs and 57th with ribbon. Then at the Pan American Championships she was 11th in the All-Around, 14th with hoop, 7th with ball, 10th with clubs and 7th with ribbon.

The following year she took All-Around 44th and 54th place in the World Cups in Sofia and Pesaro. Cusnier was again selected for the World Championships, ending 87th in the All-Around, 71st with hoop, 87th with ball, 121st with clubs, 98th with ribbon.

In 2023 she won team bronze along Camille Maldonado and Danna Cortes at the Central American and Caribbean Games.
