= Gymnastics at the 2015 Pan American Games – Women's vault =

Women's vault at the 2015 Pan American Games
- Venue: Toronto Coliseum
- Dates: July 14
- Competitors: 16 from 12 nations
- Winning score: 14.737

Medalists
Gold medal	Marcia Videaux	Cuba
Silver medal	Yamilet Peña	Dominican Republic
Bronze medal	Ellie Black	Canada

The women's vault gymnastic event at the 2015 Pan American Games was held on July 14 at the Toronto Coliseum.

== Schedule ==
All times are Eastern Standard Time (UTC-3).

Date	Time	Round
July 14, 2015	13:35	Final

== Results ==
=== Qualification ===
Position	Gymnast	Score 1	Score 2	Total	Notes
1	Marcia Videaux (CUB)	14.850	15.050	14.950	Q
2	Paula Mejias (PUR)	14.900	14.600	14.750	Q
3	Yamilet Peña (DOM)	15.100	13.900	14.500	Q
4	Ellie Black (CAN)	14.400	14.100	14.250	Q
5	Maegan Chant (CAN)	14.250	14.050	14.150	Q
6	Franchesca Santi (CHI)	14.300	13.750	14.025	Q
7	Daniele Hypólito (BRA)	14.300	13.600	13.950	Q
8	Makarena Pinto (CHI)	13.850	14.000	13.925	Q
9	Isabella Amado (PAN)	14.050	13.500	13.775	R
10	Dovelis Torres (CUB)	14.300	12.900	13.600	R
11	Ariana Orrego (PER)	13.850	13.300	13.575	R

=== Final ===
Position	Gymnast	Score 1	Score 2	Total	Notes
1st place, gold medalist(s)	Marcia Videaux (CUB)	14.575	14.900	14.737	
2nd place, silver medalist(s)	Yamilet Peña (DOM)	14.500	14.000	14.250	
3rd place, bronze medalist(s)	Ellie Black (CAN)	13.925	14.250	14.087	
4	Daniele Hypólito (BRA)	13.975	14.150	14.062	
4	Maegan Chant (CAN)	14.325	13.800	14.062	
6	Franchesca Santi (CHI)	14.500	13.425	13.962	
7	Makarena Pinto (CHI)	13.875	13.950	13.912	
8	Paula Mejias (PUR)	0.000	12.225	6.112	
