= Gymnastics at the 2017 Summer Universiade – Men's vault =

Men's vault at the 2017 Summer Universiade
- Venue: Taipei Nangang Exhibition Center
- Date: 23 August
- Competitors: 8 from 7 nations

Medalists
gold medal	Audrys Nin Reyes	Dominican Republic
silver medal	Oleg Verniaiev	Ukraine
bronze medal	Andrei Muntean	Romania

The Men's vault gymnastics at the 2017 Summer Universiade in Taipei was held on 23 August at the Taipei Nangang Exhibition Center.

== Schedule ==
All times are Taiwan Standard Time (UTC+08:00)

Date	Time	Event
Wednesday, 23 August 2017	16:00	Final

== Results ==
Rank	Athlete	Vault	Score				Total
Rank	Athlete	Vault	D Score	E Score	Pen.	Score	Total
1st place, gold medalist(s)	Audrys Nin Reyes (DOM)	1	6.000	9.033	0.100	14.933	14.783
1st place, gold medalist(s)	Audrys Nin Reyes (DOM)	2	5.600	9.033		14.633	14.783
2nd place, silver medalist(s)	Oleg Verniaiev (UKR)	1	5.600	9.166		14.766	14.733
2nd place, silver medalist(s)	Oleg Verniaiev (UKR)	2	5.600	9.200	0.100	14.700	14.733
3rd place, bronze medalist(s)	Andrei Muntean (ROU)	1	5.600	9.200		14.800	14.600
3rd place, bronze medalist(s)	Andrei Muntean (ROU)	2	5.200	9.200		14.400	14.600
4	Heikki Saarenketo (FIN)	1	5.200	9.200		14.400	14.233
4	Heikki Saarenketo (FIN)	2	4.800	9.266		14.066	14.233
5	Christopher Ian Remkes (AUS)	1	5.600	7.933		13.533	14.116
5	Christopher Ian Remkes (AUS)	2	5.600	9.100		14.700	14.116
6	Ihor Radivilov (UKR)	1	5.600	9.066	0.100	14.566	13.999
6	Ihor Radivilov (UKR)	2	5.600	8.133	0.300	13.433	13.999
7	Artur Davtyan (ARM)	1	5.600	8.200	0.100	13.700	13.883
7	Artur Davtyan (ARM)	2	4.800	9.266		14.066	13.883
8	Kim Han-sol (KOR)	1	2.800	8.866		11.666	12.995
8	Kim Han-sol (KOR)	2	5.200	9.125		14.325	12.995
