= Dominican Republic at the 2015 Summer Universiade =

- IOC code: DOM
- NOC: Dominican Republic Olympic Committee

in Gwangju, South Korea 3 – 14 July 2015
- Competitors: 10 in 3 sports
- Flag bearer: Luguelín Santos
- Medals: Gold 2 Silver 0 Bronze 0 Total 2

Summer Universiade appearances
- 1959; 1961; 1963; 1965; 1967; 1970; 1973; 1975; 1977; 1979; 1981; 1983; 1985; 1987; 1989; 1991; 1993; 1995; 1997; 1999; 2001; 2003; 2005; 2007; 2009; 2011; 2013; 2015; 2017; 2019; 2021

The Dominican Republic competed at the 2015 Summer Universiade in Gwangju, South Korea with 10 competitors in 3 sports. Sprinter Luguelín Santos was the flagbearer.

== Medalists ==
Medal	Name	Sport	Event	Date
Gold	Luguelín Santos	Athletics	400 metres	10 July
Gold	Luguelín Santos; Gustavo Cuesta; Juander Santos; Máximo Mercedes; Leonel Bonon	Athletics	Men's 4 × 400 metres relay	12 July

== Athletics ==
=== Men ===
Athlete	Event	Heats		Semifinals		Final	
Athlete	Event	Time	Rank	Time	Rank	Time	Rank
Leonel Bonon	200 metres	21.82	34 Q	22.28	31	Did not advance	
Luguelín Santos	400 metres	46.77	3 Q	46.01	3 Q	44.91 SB	1st place, gold medalist(s)
Gustavo Cuesta	400 metres	46.45	1 Q	46.10	6 Q	45.78	4
Máximo Mercedes	400 metres hurdles	52.03	21 Q PB	52.29	19	Did not advance	
Juander Santos	400 metres hurdles	50.66	3 Q	50.27	5 Q PB	50.34	7
Luguelín Santos; Gustavo Cuesta; Juander Santos; Máximo Mercedes; Leonel Bonon	4 × 400 metres relay	BYE		3:07.73	4 Q	3:05.05	1st place, gold medalist(s)

== Judo ==
=== Men ===
Athlete	Event	Round of 16	Round of 8	Quarterfinals	Semifinals	Repechage Round 1	Repechage Round 2	Final of Repechage	Bronze medal Contest	Final
Athlete	Event	Opposition Result	Opposition Result	Opposition Result	Opposition Result	Opposition Result	Opposition Result	Opposition Result	Opposition Result	Rank
José de León López	73 kg	(Germany) Schirra; W 010-101	(Republic of Ireland) Fleming; W 000S2-001S1	(Ukraine) Kanivets; L 100-000	Did not advance	BYE	(Armenia) Nikoghosyan; L 012S1-000	Did not advance		
Ronny Benzo	100 kg	(Ukraine) Dmytro Luchyn; L 000-100S4	Did not advance							

=== Women ===
Athlete	Event	Round of 32	Round of 16	Quarterfinals	Semifinals	Repechage Round 1	Repechage Round 2	Final of Repechage	Bronze medal Contest	Final	
Athlete	Event	Opposition Result	Opposition Result	Opposition Result	Opposition Result	Opposition Result	Opposition Result	Opposition Result	Opposition Result	Opposition Result	Rank
Juana Villanueva	63 kg	(Netherlands) Wichers; L 110-000S2	Did not advance			BYE	(France) Tsang-Sam-Moi; L 000-101	Did not advance			

== Taekwondo ==
=== Men ===
Athlete	Event	Round of 32	Round of 16	Quarterfinals	Semifinals	Bronze medal Contest	Final	
Athlete	Event	Opposition Result	Opposition Result	Opposition Result	Opposition Result	Opposition Result	Opposition Result	Rank
Edward Espinosa	54 kg	(Uzbekistan) Sheraliev; W 10-5	(China) Chen; W 12-1	(Belgium) Laachraoui; L 6-15	Did not advance			5

=== Women ===
Athlete	Event	Round of 32	Round of 16	Quarterfinals	Semifinals	Bronze medal Contest	Final	
Athlete	Event	Opposition Result	Opposition Result	Opposition Result	Opposition Result	Opposition Result	Opposition Result	Rank
Arlette Guzmán	46 kg	BYE	(United States) Moras-Angeles; L 2-9	Did not advance				9
