= Marcia Videaux =

Cuban artistic gymnast

- Full name: Marcia Teresa Videaux Jiménez
- Alternative name: Marcia Vidiaux
- Born: 21 July 1999 (age 27) Manzanillo, Cuba
- Height: 143 cm (4 ft 8 in)

Gymnastics career
- Discipline: Women's artistic gymnastics
- Country represented: Cuba (2015-2021)
- Club: National School of Gymnastics
- Head coaches: Yareimi Vázquez, Osniel Blanco
Medal record
Representing Cuba
Pan American Games
Gold medal – first place	2015 Toronto	Vault
Pan American Championships
Silver medal – second place	2018 Lima	Vault
Central American and Caribbean Games
Gold medal – first place	2018 Barranquilla	Team
Gold medal – first place	2018 Barranquilla	All-around
Gold medal – first place	2018 Barranquilla	Floor exercise
Silver medal – second place	2018 Barranquilla	Vault
Silver medal – second place	2018 Barranquilla	Uneven bars
FIG World Cup
Event / 1st / 2nd / 3rd; World Challenge Cup / 2 / 1 / 1

Marcia Teresa Videaux Jiménez (born 21 July 1999) is a Cuban artistic gymnast. She is the 2015 Pan American Games champion and the 2018 Pan American Championships silver medalist on the vault. She is the 2018 Central American and Caribbean Games team, all-around, and floor exercise champion and the vault and uneven bars silver medalist. She has won four medals, including two gold, on the FIG World Cup series. She represented Cuba at the 2016 and 2020 Summer Olympics.

== Career ==
Videaux began gymnastics when she was five years old.

=== 2015 ===
Videaux made her international debut at the 2015 Anadia World Challenge Cup where she won the gold medal on the vault and the bronze medal on the uneven bars. She then won the gold medal in the vault final at the Pan American Games in Toronto with an average score of 14.737. Additionally, Cuba placed fourth in the team competition, and Videaux placed ninth in the all-around final. At the Osijek World Challenge Cup, she won the silver medal on the floor exercise behind Paula Mejías and also placed fifth on vault and seventh on uneven bars. She then competed at the World Championships in Glasgow and finished fifty-fifth in the all-around during the qualification round.

=== 2016 ===
Videaux competed at the Olympic Test Event and qualified for the 2016 Olympic Games by finished twenty-sixth in the all-around. She then won the gold medal on the vault at the Anadia World Challenge Cup and also finished eighth on the uneven bars. She represented Cuba at the 2016 Summer Olympics and finished forty-eighth in the all-around during the qualification round with a total score of 52.024.

=== 2017 ===
Videaux competed at the Central American Sports Festival in Guatemala City and won the silver medal in the all-around behind teammate Yesenia Ferrera and Cuba won the team silver medal by one point behind Mexico. She also won the uneven bars gold medal and the bronze medals on balance beam and floor exercise. Then at the World Championships in Montreal, she only competed on the vault and uneven bars and did not advance into either final.

=== 2018 ===
At the Central American and Caribbean Games, Videaux won gold medals with the Cuban team and in the individual all-around where she finished 1.700 ahead of silver-medalist Andrea Maldonado. Then in the event finals, she won another gold on the floor exercise and also won silver medals on the vault and the uneven bars. Then at the Pan American Championships, she won the silver medal on vault behind Jade Carey and placed fifth in the all-around, floor exercise, and team competition. She was not sent to the World Championships in Doha due to budget cuts by Cuba's National Sports and Recreation Institute.

=== 2019 ===
Videaux qualified for the vault final at the Doha World Cup in fifth place, but she withdrew due to a thigh injury. Then at the Pan American Games, she placed sixth with the Cuban team, tenth in the all-around, and seventh in the vault final. She qualified for an individual spot at the 2020 Olympic Games by finishing fifty-third in the all-around at the 2019 World Championships.

=== 2020-21 ===
Videaux did not compete in 2020 or prior to the postponed 2020 Olympic Games due to the COVID-19 pandemic in Cuba.

Videaux represented Cuba at the 2020 Summer Olympics and decided to only compete on the vault in order to focus on qualifying for the vault final. However, she fell on her second vault during the qualification round and placed sixteenth, missing the event final.

== Personal life ==
In 2023, Videaux emigrated from Cuba and moved to Miami, Florida.

== Competitive history ==
Year	Event	Team	AA	VT	UB	BB	FX
2015	Anadia World Challenge Cup			1st place, gold medalist(s)	3rd place, bronze medalist(s)		
2015	Pan American Games	4	9	1st place, gold medalist(s)			
2015	Osijek World Challenge Cup			5	7		2nd place, silver medalist(s)
2015	World Championships		55				
2016	Olympic Test Event		26				
2016	Anadia World Challenge Cup			1st place, gold medalist(s)	8		
2016	Olympic Games		48				
2017	Central American Sports Festival	2nd place, silver medalist(s)	2nd place, silver medalist(s)		1st place, gold medalist(s)	3rd place, bronze medalist(s)	3rd place, bronze medalist(s)
2018	Central American and Caribbean Games	1st place, gold medalist(s)	1st place, gold medalist(s)	2nd place, silver medalist(s)	2nd place, silver medalist(s)		1st place, gold medalist(s)
2018	Pan American Championships	5	5	2nd place, silver medalist(s)			5
2019	Doha World Cup			WD			
2019	Pan American Games	6	10	7			
2019	World Championships		53				
2021
2021	Olympic Games			16			
