= Dominican Republic at the 2017 Summer Universiade =

- IOC code: DOM
- NOC: Dominican Republic Olympic Committee

in Taipei, Taiwan] 19 – 30 August 2017
- Competitors: 29 in 5 sports
- Flag bearer: Luguelín Santos
- Officials: 17
- Medals Ranked 18th: Gold 4 Silver 2 Bronze 0 Total 6

Summer Universiade appearances
- 1959; 1961; 1963; 1965; 1967; 1970; 1973; 1975; 1977; 1979; 1981; 1983; 1985; 1987; 1989; 1991; 1993; 1995; 1997; 1999; 2001; 2003; 2005; 2007; 2009; 2011; 2013; 2015; 2017; 2019; 2021; 2025; 2027

The Dominican Republic participated at the 2017 Summer Universiade in Taipei, Taiwan with 29 competitors in 5 sports. The flag bearer was sprinter Luguelín Santos.

== Medal summary ==
Medal	Name	Sport	Event	Date
Gold	Luis Charles; Andito Charles; Kendris Díaz; Juander Santos; Luguelín Santos	Athletics	4 × 400 m relay	28 August
Gold	Audrys Nin Reyes	Gymnastics	Men's vault	23 August
Gold	Luguelín Santos	Athletics	400 metres	25 August
Gold	Juander Santos	Athletics	400 metres hurdles	26 August
Silver	Luis García	Weightlifting	Men's 56 kg	20 August
Silver	Beatriz Pirón	Weightlifting	Women's 48 kg	20 August

== Athletics ==
Key

- Note– Ranks given for track events are within the athlete's heat only
- Q = Qualified for the next round
- q = Qualified for the next round as a fastest loser or, in field events, by position without achieving the qualifying target
- N/A = Round not applicable for the event

Men
Track & road events

Athlete	Event	Heat		Quarterfinals		Semifinal		Final	
Athlete	Event	Time	Rank	Time	Rank	Time	Rank	Time	Rank
Kendris Díaz	200 metres	22.12	41	did not advance					
Andito Charles	200 metres	22.04	39	did not advance					
Luguelín Santos	400 metres	47.34	11 Q	—N/a		45.85	1 Q	45.24 SB	1st place, gold medalist(s)
Luis Charles	400 metres	47.42	11 Q	—N/a		47.37	17	did not advance	
Juander Santos	400 metres hurdles	50.37	4 Q	—N/a		49.31	1 Q	48.65	1st place, gold medalist(s)
Álvaro Abreu	3000 metres steeplechase	—N/a						8:54.19	12 PB
Luis Charles; Andito Charles; Kendris Díaz; Juander Santos; Luguelín Santos	4 × 400 m relay	3:07.98	2 Q	—N/a				3:04.34	1st place, gold medalist(s)

Women
Track & road events

Athlete	Event	Heat		Quarterfinals		Semifinal		Final	
Athlete	Event	Time	Rank	Time	Rank	Time	Rank	Time	Rank
Kiara Rodríguez	100 metres	12.18	37	did not advance					
Estrella de Aza	100 metres	12.11	34	did not advance					
Anabel Medina Ventura	200 metres	23.79	5 Q	24.47	20	did not advance			
Marileidy Paulino	200 metres	24.13	13 Q	23.95	11	did not advance			
Oneida Valerio	100 metres hurdles	14.68	30	—N/a		did not advance			
Estrella de Aza; Anabel Medina Ventura; Marileidy Paulino; Kiara Rodríguez; Oneida Valerio	4 × 100 metres relay	DQ		—N/a				did not advance	

== Gymnastics ==
=== Artistic ===
Men

Athlete	Event	Qualification								Final							
Athlete	Event	Apparatus						Total	Rank	Apparatus						Total	Rank
Athlete	Event	F	PH	R	V	PB	HB	Total	Rank	F	PH	R	V	PB	HB	Total	Rank
Audrys Nin Reyes	Individual	—N/a			14.700 Q	12.850	13.050	40.600	90	did not advance						—N/a	
Audrys Nin Reyes	Vault	—N/a						14.362	7	—N/a			14.783	—N/a		14.783	1st place, gold medalist(s)

Women

Athlete	Event	Qualification						Final					
Athlete	Event	Apparatus				Total	Rank	Apparatus				Total	Rank
Athlete	Event	V	UB	BB	F	Total	Rank	V	UB	BB	F	Total	Rank
Yamilet Peña	Individual	14.000 Q	9.250	9.700	11.950	44.900	32	did not advance				—N/a	
Yamilet Peña	Vault	—N/a						13.266	—N/a			13.266	6

== Judo ==
Men

Athlete	Event	1/16 Final	1/8 Final	1/4 Final	Semifinal	Repechage 16	Repechage 8	Final Repechage	Final / BM	
Athlete	Event	Opposition Score	Opposition Score	Opposition Score	Opposition Score	Opposition Score	Opposition Score	Opposition Score	Opposition Score	Rank
Daniel Santos	Men's −60 kg	Dimarca (BEL); L 00–02	did not advance							
Lwilli Santana	Men's −73 kg	Urani (FRA); L 00–10	did not advance			Manukian (UKR); L 00–11	did not advance			

Women

Athlete	Event	1/16 Final	1/8 Final	1/4 Final	Semifinal	Repechage 16	Repechage 8	Final Repechage	Final / BM	
Athlete	Event	Opposition Score	Opposition Score	Opposition Score	Opposition Score	Opposition Score	Opposition Score	Opposition Score	Opposition Score	Rank
Isandrina Sánchez	Women's −48 kg	Zegers (NED); L 00–01	did not advance							

== Taekwondo ==
Athlete	Event	Round of 64	Round of 32	Round of 16	Quarterfinals	Semifinals	Final	
Athlete	Event	Opposition Result	Opposition Result	Opposition Result	Opposition Result	Opposition Result	Opposition Result	Rank
Edward Espinosa	Men's −54 kg	—N/a	Hidayatullah (INA); L 16–17	did not advance				
Luisito Pie	Men's −58 kg	—N/a	Poiedynok (UKR); L 9–10	did not advance				
Bernardo Pie	Men's −63 kg	Abuov (KAZ); W 24–4	Pilavakis (CYP); W 15–12	Navea (CHI); L 13–14	did not advance			9
Moises Hernández	Men's −80 kg	—N/a	Tomlinson (CAN); W 12–6	Kim (KOR); W 15–13	Martínez (ESP); L 3–11	did not advance		5
Génesis Andujar	Women's −57 kg	—N/a	Aguirre (CHI); L 13–15	did not advance				
Daysy Montes de Oca	Women's −67 kg	—N/a	Chudhary (IND); W 29–8	Kim (KOR); L 0–21	did not advance			9
Katherine Rodríguez	Women's −73 kg	—N/a		Bajic (SRB); W 5-4	An (KOR); L 5–7	did not advance		5

== Weightlifting ==
Athlete	Event	Snatch		Clean & Jerk		Total	Rank
Athlete	Event	Result	Rank	Result	Rank	Total	Rank
Luis García	Men's −56 kg	119	2	144	2	263	2nd place, silver medalist(s)
Beatriz Pirón	Women's −48 kg	85	2	103	2	188	2nd place, silver medalist(s)
Carolanni Reyes	Women's −53 kg	76	7	95	7	171	7
