= Audrys Nin Reyes =

Dominican Republic artistic gymnast

- Born: 2 January 1995 (age 31) Tamayo, Dominican Republic
- Height: 167 cm (5 ft 6 in)

Gymnastics career
- Discipline: Men's artistic gymnastics
- Country represented: Dominican Republic
- Gym: Fedogym Santo Domingo
- Head coach: Ramón Amauris
Medal record
Representing Dominican Republic
Pan American Games
| Gold medal – first place | 2019 Lima | Vault |
| Gold medal – first place | 2023 Santiago | Vault |
Pan American Championships
| Gold medal – first place | 2017 Lima | Vault |
| Gold medal – first place | 2017 Lima | Horizontal bar |
| Bronze medal – third place | 2017 Lima | Parallel bars |
Central American and Caribbean Games
| Gold medal – first place | 2018 Barranquilla | Vault |
| Gold medal – first place | 2023 San Salvador | Vault |
| Silver medal – second place | 2014 Veracruz | Vault |
| Silver medal – second place | 2023 San Salvador | All-around |
| Silver medal – second place | 2023 San Salvador | Horizontal bar |
| Bronze medal – third place | 2014 Veracruz | Horizontal bar |
| Bronze medal – third place | 2018 Barranquilla | All-around |
| Bronze medal – third place | 2018 Barranquilla | Pommel horse |
| Bronze medal – third place | 2023 San Salvador | Pommel horse |
World University Games
| Gold medal – first place | 2017 Taipei | Vault |

Audrys Nin Reyes (born 2 January 1995) is a Dominican artistic gymnast. He is the 2019 and 2023 Pan American Games vault champion. He was the first Dominican gymnast to win a gold medal at the Pan American Games. He was also the first Dominican gymnast to win a gold medal at an FIG World Cup event when he won the vault title at the 2017 Osijek World Challenge Cup. He is the 2017 Pan American vault and horizontal bar champion and the 2017 Universiade vault champion. He is also the 2018 and 2023 Central American and Caribbean Games vault champion. He has qualified to represent the Dominican Republic at the 2024 Summer Olympics, the first male gymnast from his country to do so.

== Early life ==
Nin Reyes grew up playing baseball and basketball, and he began gymnastics when he was 11 years old. He moved to Santo Domingo to train shortly afterward.

== Gymnastics career ==
At the junior level, Nin Reyes won the bronze medal on the vault at the 2012 Pan American Championships. He also placed 18th in the all-around and sixth on the horizontal bar.

=== 2013–14 ===
Nin Reyes began competing on the senior level in 2013. At the 2013 Bolivarian Games, he won the gold medal on the vault and the bronze medal on the horizontal bar. He made his World Championships debut in Antwerp, but he did not advance into any finals. He finished 71st in the all-around during the qualification round.

Nin Reyes won the silver medal on the vault at the 2014 Anadia World Challenge Cup. He then tied with Sean Melton for the silver medal on the horizontal bar at the 2014 Pan American Sports Festival. He also placed eighth on floor exercise, fourth on pommel horse and vault, and sixth on parallel bars. Then at the 2014 Central American and Caribbean Games, he won the silver medal on the vault behind Cuba's Manrique Larduet. Additionally, he finished sixth in the all-around and fourth on floor exercise.

=== 2015–16 ===
Nin Reyes won the bronze medal on the horizontal bar at the 2015 São Paulo World Cup. A few weeks later at the Anadia World Cup, he placed eighth on the vault and seventh on the horizontal bar. He then represented the Dominican Republic at the 2015 Pan American Games where he was the third reserve for the vault final and the second reserve for the horizontal bar final. He did not advance into any finals. Despite fracturing two of his fingers, he still competed at the World Championships in Glasgow, but he did not advance beyond the qualification round, finishing 96th in the all-around. As a result, the Dominican Republic did not qualify a spot for the 2016 Olympic Test Event, meaning Nin Reyes could not qualify for the 2016 Olympic Games.

=== 2017 ===
Nin Reyes became the first Dominican gymnast to win a gold medal at an FIG World Cup event when he won the gold medal on vault at the 2017 Osijek World Challenge Cup. He also finished seventh on the parallel bars and fifth on the horizontal bar. Then at the Pan American Championships in Lima, he won the vault and horizontal bar titles, and he won bronze on the parallel bar. He represented the Dominican Republic at the 2017 Summer Universiade held in Taipei, Taiwan, and he won the gold medal on the vault. He won another gold medal on vault at the Paris World Challenge Cup. He could not compete at the 2017 World Championships in Montreal due to a knee injury.

=== 2018 ===
At the 2018 Osijek World Challenge Cup, Nin Reyes won the bronze medal on the parallel bars, and he placed fifth on the vault. Then at the Koper World Challenge Cup, he won the silver medal on the horizontal bar, and he placed sixth on the vault. He was selected as the Dominican Republic's flag bearer for the 2018 Central American and Caribbean Games in Barranquilla. There, he won the bronze medal in the all-around behind Cuban gymnasts Manrique Larduet and Randy Lerú. Then in the event finals, he won the vault gold medal and the pommel horse bronze medal. He also placed sixth on the still rings and parallel bars and seventh on the floor exercise and horizontal bar. Later that year, he competed at the 2018 Pan American Championships and placed eighth on the vault and 23rd in the all-around. At the 2018 World Championships held in Doha, he only competed on the vault, but he finished 28th in the qualification round and did not advance into the final.

=== 2019–20 ===
At the 2019 Koper World Challenge Cup, Nin Reyes placed fourth on the vault. He became the first gymnast from the Dominican Republic to win a gold medal at the Pan American Games when he won the 2019 Pan American Games vault title. At the 2019 World Championships, he finished 66th in the all-around and did not advance into any finals. This result meant he did not qualify automatically for the 2020 Olympic Games.

Nin Reyes competed in the 2020 World Cup series in an attempt to qualify for the 2020 Olympic Games. After the World Championships, he competed at the Cottbus World Cup, he won the silver medal on vault behind Ukraine's Igor Radivilov. He earned 30 points toward Olympic qualification. At the 2020 Melbourne World Cup, he finished eighth in the vault final, earning 12 Olympic qualification points. Then at the 2020 Baku World Cup, he finished 11th in the qualification round, making him the third reserve for the final. He earned only 6 Olympic qualification points from this result, and he finished seventh overall in the World Cup vault standings and did not earn an Olympic berth.

=== 2021–23 ===
Nin Reyes competed at the 2021 Pan American Championships in Rio de Janeiro, his final opportunity to win an Olympic spot. However, an ankle injury limited him to two events, meaning he could not earn the Olympic spot. He finished 21st in the all-around at the 2022 Pan American Championships. At the end of 2022, he injured a ligament in his right ankle, but he chose to not undergo surgery to compete for the spot at the 2024 Olympic Games.

Nin Reyes began the season at the 2023 Cottbus World Cup, but he did not qualify for any finals. He finished ninth on vault in the qualification round at the 2023 Doha World Cup, making him the second reserve for the final. He placed 18th in the all-around at the 2023 Pan American Championships held in Medellín, Colombia. Then at the 2023 Central American and Caribbean Games, he won the silver medal in the all-around behind Cuba's Diorges Escobar. Then in the event finals, he won gold on the vault, silver on the horizontal bar, and bronze on the pommel horse. He also placed fourth on the parallel bars and fifth with the Dominican team. He then competed on all six events at the Paris World Challenge Cup, but he did not advance into any finals. At the 2023 World Championships, he finished 10th on the vault in the qualification round, making him the first reserve for the final. As a result, he did not earn the vault apparatus spot for the 2024 Olympic Games because Kevin Penev finished above him.

At the 2023 Pan American Games, Nin Reyes finished fifth in the all-around final. Because he was the highest-placing gymnast who had not already qualified for the 2024 Olympic Games, Nin Reyes received the individual quota. This marked the first time a male gymnast from the Dominican Republic qualified for the Olympic Games. He then won the gold medal in the vault final, defending his Pan American Games title, and he also placed seventh in the horizontal bar final.

== Personal life ==
As of 2023, Nin Reyes is a student at the Universidad Autónoma de Santo Domingo where he studies physical education. He bought a house for his mother with his prize money from the 2017 World Cup series. He speaks English and Spanish.

== Awards and honors ==
The Dominica Olympic Committee named Nin Reyes the Athlete of the Year in 2018.

== Eponymous skills ==
Nin Reyes has two pommel horse skills named after him in the Code of Points.

| Apparatus | Name | Description | Difficulty (Note: Valid for the 2022–2024 Code of Points) |
|---|---|---|---|
| Pommel horse | Nin Reyes | Any travel fwd. 3/3 with ½ Spindle from one pommel over the other pommel | D |
| Pommel horse | Nin Reyes II | Travel 3/3 over both pommels with ½ Spindle | E |

Olympic Games
| Preceded by Rodrigo Marte; Prisilla Rivera | Flag bearer for Dominican Republic; Paris 2024 with Marileidy Paulino | Succeeded by Incumbent |
