= Gymnastics at the 2018 Central American and Caribbean Games =

Aspect of the 2018 Central American and Caribbean Games

- Venue: Centro Eventos Puerta de Oro
- Location: Barranquilla, Colombia
- Dates: 20 July – 2 August

The gymnastics competition at the 2018 Central American and Caribbean Games was held in Barranquilla, Colombia, from 20 July to 2 August 2018 at the Centro Eventos Puerta de Oro.

== Medal summary ==
=== Artistic ===
==== Men's events ====
Event	Gold	Silver	Bronze
Team All-Around	Colombia (COL); Andrés Martínez; Carlos Calvo; Didier Lugo; Jossimar Calvo; Javier Sandoval	Cuba (CUB); Manrique Larduet; Randy Lerú; Alberto Leyva; Rafael Rosendi; Ariam Vergara	Mexico (MEX); Fabián de Luna; Edwin López; Miguel Romero; Kevin Cerda; Isaac Núñez
Individual All-Around	Manrique Larduet (CUB)	Randy Lerú (CUB)	Audrys Nin (DOM)
Floor	Jorge Vega (GUA)	Jossimar Calvo (COL)	Randy Lerú (CUB)
Pommel Horse	Jossimar Calvo (COL)	Manrique Larduet (CUB)	Audrys Nin (DOM)
Rings	Manrique Larduet (CUB)	Fabián de Luna (MEX)	Jossimar Calvo (COL)
Vault	Audrys Nin (DOM)	Manrique Larduet (CUB)	Jorge Vega (GUA)
Parallel Bars	Manrique Larduet (CUB)	Jossimar Calvo (COL)	Javier Sandoval (COL)
Horizontal Bar	Jossimar Calvo (COL)	Randy Lerú (CUB)	Manrique Larduet (CUB)

==== Women's events ====
Event	Gold	Silver	Bronze
Team All-Around	Cuba (CUB); Marcia Vidiaux; Yumila Rodríguez; Norma Zamora; Mary Morffi	Colombia (COL); Dayana Ardila; Ginna Escobar; Laura Pardo; Melba Avendaño; Erla Vera	Mexico (MEX); Nicolle Castro; Paulina Campos; Jimena Moreno; Ahtziri Sandoval; Victoria Mata
Individual All-Around	Marcia Vidiaux (CUB)	Andrea Maldonado (PUR)	Dayana Ardila (COL)
Vault	Yamilet Pena (DOM)	Marcia Vidiaux (CUB)	Ahtziri Sandoval (MEX)
Uneven Bars	Ahtziri Sandoval (MEX)	Marcia Vidiaux (CUB)	Laura Pardo (COL)
Balance Beam	Bianca León (PUR)	Jimena Moreno (MEX)	Dayana Ardila (COL)
Floor	Marcia Vidiaux (CUB)	Karelys Díaz (PUR)	Andrea Maldonado (PUR)

=== Rhythmic ===
==== Individual ====
Event	Gold	Silver	Bronze
All-Around	Rut Castillo (MEX)	Marina Malpica (MEX)	Lina Dussan (COL)
Hoop	Marina Malpica (MEX)	Rut Castillo (MEX)	Lina Dussan (COL)
Ball	Marina Malpica (MEX)	Ledia Juárez (MEX)	Lina Dussan (COL)
Clubs	Rut Castillo (MEX)	Marina Malpica (MEX)	Giuliana Cusnier (PUR)
Ribbon	Rut Castillo (MEX)	Ana Aponte (PUR)	Giuliana Cusnier (PUR)

==== Group ====
Event	Gold	Silver	Bronze
All-Around	Mexico (MEX); Marcela Quijano; Mildred Maldonado; Sara Ruiz; Brittany Sainz; Karen Villanueva	Cuba (CUB); Melissa Kindelán; Elaine Rojas; Claudia Arjona; Danay Utria; Anisleidy Chirino	Venezuela (VEN); Anais Montiel; Juliette Quiroz; Sofia Suárez; Kizzy Rivas; María Ojeda
5 Hoops	Mexico (MEX); Marcela Quijano; Mildred Maldonado; Sara Ruiz; Brittany Sainz; Karen Villanueva	Cuba (CUB); Melissa Kindelán; Elaine Rojas; Claudia Arjona; Danay Utria; Anisleidy Chirino	Venezuela (VEN); Anais Montiel; Juliette Quiroz; Sofia Suárez; Kizzy Rivas; María Ojeda
3 Balls & 2 Ropes	Cuba (CUB); Melissa Kindelán; Elaine Rojas; Claudia Arjona; Danay Utria; Anisleidy Chirino	Mexico (MEX); Marcela Quijano; Mildred Maldonado; Sara Ruiz; Brittany Sainz; Karen Villanueva	Venezuela (VEN); Anais Montiel; Juliette Quiroz; Sofia Suárez; Kizzy Rivas; María Ojeda

=== Trampoline ===
Event	Gold	Silver	Bronze
Men’s Individual	Ángel Hernández (COL)	Luis Loría (MEX)	Álvaro Calero (COL)
Men’s Synchronised	Mexico (MEX); Luis Loría; Amado Lozano	Colombia (COL); Álvaro Calero; Ángel Hernández	Dominican Republic (DOM); Junior Mateo; Luis Gerardo
Women’s Individual	Dafne Navarro (MEX)	Melissa Flores (MEX)	Alida Rojo (VEN)

== Medal table ==
* Host nation (Colombia)

Rank	Nation	Gold	Silver	Bronze	Total
1	Mexico (MEX)	10	9	3	22
2	Cuba (CUB)	7	9	2	18
3	Colombia (COL)*	4	4	9	17
4	Dominican Republic (DOM)	2	0	3	5
5	Puerto Rico (PUR)	1	3	3	7
6	Guatemala (GUA)	1	0	1	2
7	Venezuela (VEN)	0	0	4	4
Totals (7 entries)		25	25	25	75
