= Seiya Taura =

Japanese artistic gymnast

- Full name: 田浦 誠也
- Born: 9 June 1995 (age 31)
- Height: 1.64 m (5 ft 5 in)

Gymnastics career
- Discipline: Men's artistic gymnastics
- Country represented: Japan
- College team: Nittaidai
- Club: Tokushukai
- Head coaches: Yuji Sano; Yuya Shintaku; Naoki Morichika
Medal record
Representing Japan
FIG World Cup
Event	1st	2nd	3rd
World Challenge Cup	2	0	0

Seiya Taura (田浦 誠也, Taura Seiya; born 9 June 1995) is a Japanese artistic gymnast. Born in Osaka, he graduated from Nippon Sport Science University and later joins Tokushukai Gymnastics Club. Taura has represented Japan at several FIG World Cup competitions.

== See also ==
- Japan men's national gymnastics team
