= Randy Lerú =

Cuban artistic gymnast (born 1995)

- Full name: Randy José Lerú Bell
- Born: 7 November 1995 (age 30) Santiago de Cuba, Cuba
- Height: 1.73 m (5 ft 8 in)

Gymnastics career
- Discipline: Men's artistic gymnastics
- Country represented: Cuba (2015)
- Head coach: Carlos Rafael Gil
Medal record
Men's artistic gymnastics
Representing Cuba
Pan American Championships
Bronze medal – third place	2018 Lima	Horizontal bar
Central American and Caribbean Games
Silver medal – second place	2018 Barranquilla	Team
Silver medal – second place	2018 Barranquilla	All-around
Silver medal – second place	2018 Barranquilla	Horizontal bar
Bronze medal – third place	2014 Veracruz	Team
Bronze medal – third place	2018 Barranquilla	Floor exercise

Randy José Lerú Bell (born November 7, 1995) is a Cuban male artistic gymnast and a member of the national team. He participated at the 2015 World Artistic Gymnastics Championships in Glasgow, and qualified for the 2016 Summer Olympics.
