= Brooklyn Moors =

Canadian artistic gymnast

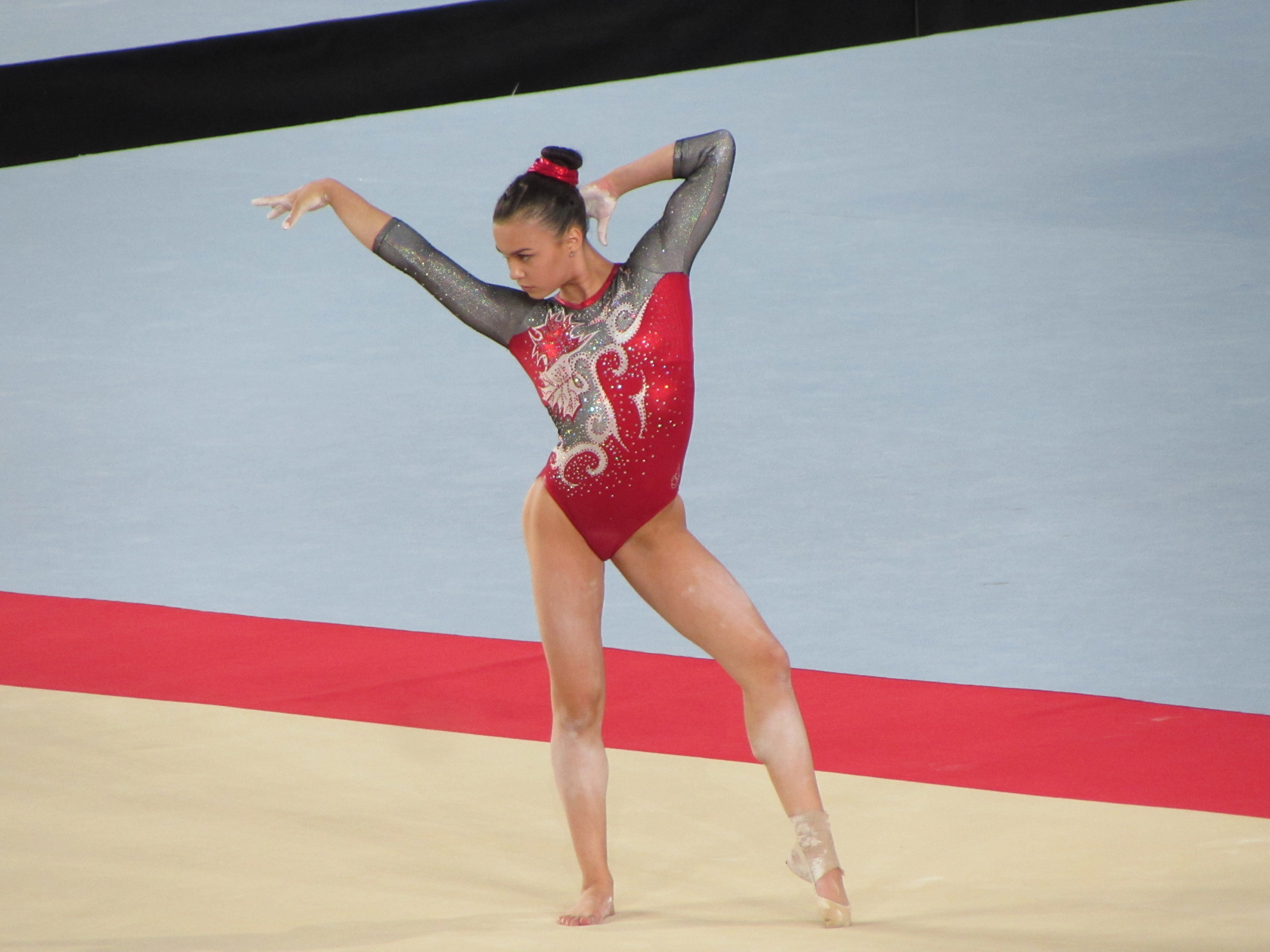
- Moors at the 2017 World Championships

Personal information
- Full name: Brooklyn Chloe Moors
- Born: February 23, 2001 (age 25) Cambridge, Ontario
- Height: 158 cm (5 ft 2 in)

Gymnastics career
- Discipline: Women's artistic gymnastics
- Country represented: Canada; (2017–2021)
- College team: UCLA Bruins (2022–2025)
- Head coach: Elvira Saadi
Medal record
Women's artistic gymnastics
Representing Canada
Pan American Games
Gold medal – first place	2019 Lima	Floor exercise
Silver medal – second place	2019 Lima	Team
Pan American Championships
Gold medal – first place	2017 Lima	Floor exercise
Silver medal – second place	2017 Lima	Vault
Bronze medal – third place	2017 Lima	Uneven bars
FIG World Cup
Event	1st	2nd	3rd
World Challenge Cup	1	0	1
Total	1	0	1
Representing the UCLA Bruins
NCAA Championships
Gold medal – first place	2025 Fort Worth	Floor exercise
Silver medal – second place	2025 Fort Worth	Team
- Awards: Longines Prize for Elegance (2017)

Brooklyn Chloe Moors (born February 23, 2001) is a retired Canadian artistic gymnast who competed at the 2020 Olympic Games and represented Canada at the 2017, 2018, and 2019 World Championships. At the 2017 World Championships, she became the first Canadian to win the Longines Prize for Elegance. She is the 2019 Pan American Games champion on the floor exercise and the silver medalist with the team. She is also the 2017 Pan American champion on the floor exercise. She competed for the UCLA Bruins in collegiate gymnastics from 2022 until 2025.

== Early life ==
Brooklyn Chloe Moors was born on February 23, 2001, in Cambridge, Ontario. She is the younger sister of 2012 Olympic gymnast Victoria Moors, who inspired her to begin gymnastics when she was three years old.

== Junior career ==
Moors made her elite debut at 2016 Elite Canada where she finished twenty-first in the all-around. In the event finals, she won the silver medal on the balance beam behind Jade Chrobok. She then made her international debut at the 2016 Nadia Comaneci Invitational and finished eighth in the all-around. Then at the 2016 International Gymnix, she finished fourth in the all-around and won the gold medal on the floor exercise. She then won the bronze medal in the all-around at the 2016 Canadian Championships. Her final meet of the 2016 season was the Elite Gym Massilia in Marseille where she finished seventeenth in the all-around.

== Senior career ==
=== 2017 ===
Moors became age-eligible for senior competition in 2017, and she made her senior debut at Elite Canada where she won the bronze medal in the all-around. She then finished fifth in the vault and floor final and sixth in the balance beam final. Then at the International Gymnix, she won the bronze medal in the all-around behind Hitomi Hatakeda and Shallon Olsen and won the gold medal with the Canadian team. In the event finals, she placed fourth on vault and balance beam, and fifth on the floor exercise. At the City of Jesolo Trophy, Moors helped the Canadian team finish sixth, and she finished fifth in the vault final. She then finished seventh in the all-around at the Canadian Championships, and she won the bronze medal on vault.

Moors was then selected to compete at the Pan American Championships in Lima. She won the silver medal on vault behind Mexican gymnast Ahtziri Sandoval, won the bronze medal on the uneven bars behind Jade Chrobok and Sandoval, placed seventh on the balance beam, and won the gold medal on the floor exercise. She then competed at the Szombathely Challenge Cup and won the bronze medal on vault behind Marina Nekrasova and Boglárka Dévai, and she won the gold medal on floor exercise. She was then selected to compete at the World Championships in Montreal where she finished 15th in the all-around and fifth on the floor exercise. After the competition, she was awarded the Longines Prize for Elegance and became the first Canadian to receive this award.

=== 2018 ===
In February, Moors competed at Elite Canada where she placed first in the all-around and on floor exercise and placed second on balance beam behind Rose-Kaying Woo. Then in March she competed at the American Cup where she placed seventh in the all-around. Then at the Canadian National Championships, she placed fourth in the all-around behind Ellie Black, Isabela Onyshko, and Jade Chrobok.

In early October, Moors was selected to represent Canada at the World Championships in Doha alongside Black, Ana Padurariu, Shallon Olsen, and Laurie Dénommée (later replaced by Sophie Marois). During the qualification round Moors helped Canada qualify to the team final in fourth place, and individually, she qualified to the all-around and floor exercise finals. During the team final, Moors contributed scores of 13.233 on the floor exercise and 13.066 on the uneven bars to help Canada finish fourth behind the United States, Russia, and China— Team Canada's best finish ever at the World Championships. Moors then finished 24th in the all-around final with a total score of 50.332. She then finished eighth in the floor exercise final with a score of 13.066.

=== 2019 ===
At the Canadian Championships, Moors won the bronze medal in the all-around behind Ellie Black and Ana Padurariu, and she won the gold medal on the balance beam and the silver medal on the floor exercise behind Black. In June, she was selected to compete at the Pan American Games alongside Black, Isabela Onyshko, Shallon Olsen, and Victoria-Kayen Woo. They won the silver medal in the team competition behind the United States. During the first day of event finals, Moors placed sixth on uneven bars with a score of 13.000. The following day she scored a 13.900 to win the gold medal on floor exercise ahead of Kara Eaker of the United States and Flávia Saraiva of Brazil.

On September 4, Moors was named to compete at the World Championships in Stuttgart, Germany alongside Ana Padurariu, Shallon Olsen, Ellie Black, and Victoria-Kayen Woo. Canada finished seventh in the team final and qualified as a team for the 2020 Olympic Games in Tokyo. During the individual finals, Moors finished 14th in the all-around with a total score of 54.498. She then finished seventh on floor exercise with a score of 13.600.

=== 2020 ===
In January, it was announced that Moors would represent Canada at the American Cup, but she was later replaced by Ellie Black. Her first competition of the season was Elite Canada, where she placed second in the all-around behind Ana Padurariu. She also won the silver medals on the uneven bars and the balance beam, and she won the gold medal on the floor exercise. In February, she signed her national letter of intent with UCLA, intending to start competing during the 2020–21 school year. However, due to the COVID-19 pandemic she took classes remotely and redshirted the 2021 season in order to train for the postponed 2020 Olympic Games. She also took eight months off of training due to a back injury.

=== 2021 ===
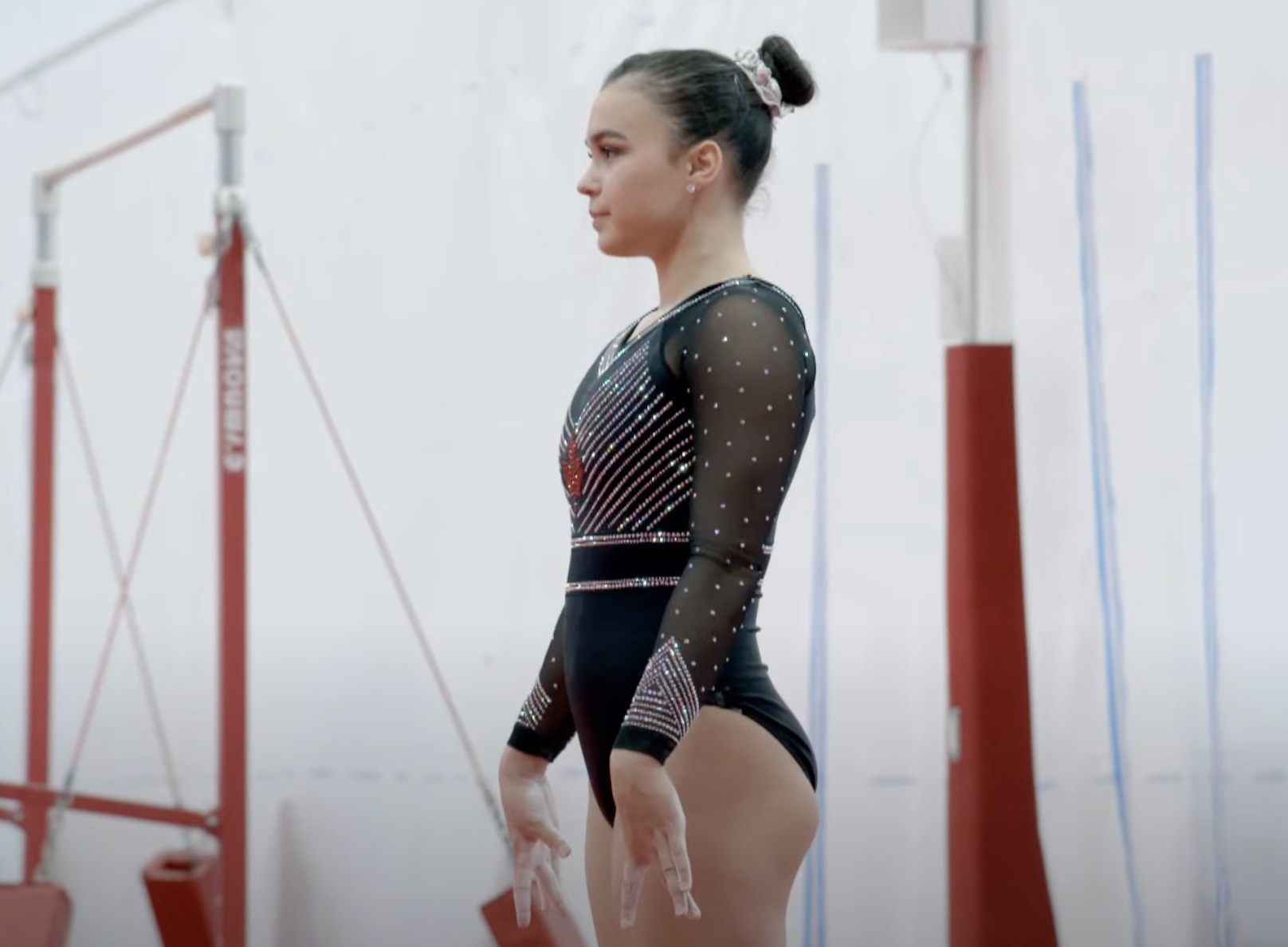
Moors at the 2021 Canadian Championships

At the Second Canadian Technical Trial, Moors only competed on vault, balance beam, and floor exercise due to recovering from her back injury. She won the silver medal on the floor exercise behind Rose-Kaying Woo. At the Canadian National Championships, she placed eighth in the all-around after struggling on the uneven bars. However, she won gold on floor exercise and placed sixth on balance beam. On June 17, Moors was officially named to Canada's 2020 Olympic team alongside Ellie Black, Shallon Olsen, and Ava Stewart. The team finished tenth in the qualification round and did not qualify for the team final, but Moors qualified for the all-around final in 22nd place. She finished 16th in the all-around final with a total score of 53.299.

== NCAA career ==
Moors enrolled at UCLA and began taking classes remotely during the 2020–21 school year; however she redshirted the season to focus on training for the 2020 Olympic Games. She started competing for the UCLA Bruins during the 2021–22 season.

In 2025, Moors won the individual floor title at the NCAA national championships.

=== Career perfect 10.0 ===
Season	Date	Event	Meet
2025	March 22, 2025	Floor exercise	Big Ten Championships

== Competitive history ==
Competitive history of Brooklyn Moors
Year	Event	Team	AA	VT	UB	BB	FX
2016	Elite Canada		21			2nd place, silver medalist(s)	
2016	Nadia Comaneci Invitational		8				
2016	International Gymnix		4				1st place, gold medalist(s)
2016	Junior Canadian Championships		3rd place, bronze medalist(s)				
2016	Elite Gym Massilia		17				
2017	Elite Canada		3rd place, bronze medalist(s)	5		6	5
2017	International Gymnix	1st place, gold medalist(s)	3rd place, bronze medalist(s)	4		4	5
2017	City of Jesolo Trophy	6	27	5			
2017	Canadian Championships		7	3rd place, bronze medalist(s)			
2017	Pan American Championships			2nd place, silver medalist(s)	3rd place, bronze medalist(s)	7	1st place, gold medalist(s)
2017	Szombathely Challenge Cup			3rd place, bronze medalist(s)			1st place, gold medalist(s)
2017	World Championships		15				5
2018	Elite Canada		1st place, gold medalist(s)			2nd place, silver medalist(s)	1st place, gold medalist(s)
2018	American Cup		7				
2018	Canadian Championships		4			7	4
2018	World Championships	4	24				8
2019	Canadian Championships		3rd place, bronze medalist(s)		5	1st place, gold medalist(s)	2nd place, silver medalist(s)
2019	Pan American Games	2nd place, silver medalist(s)			6		1st place, gold medalist(s)
2019	World Championships	7	14				7
2020	Elite Canada		2nd place, silver medalist(s)		2nd place, silver medalist(s)	2nd place, silver medalist(s)	1st place, gold medalist(s)
2021	Canadian Championships		8		26	6	1st place, gold medalist(s)
2021	Olympic Games	10	16				R3
2025	NCAA Championships	2nd place, silver medalist(s)		40			1st place, gold medalist(s)
