= 2018 World Artistic Gymnastics Championships =

Gymnastics competition

2018 World Artistic Gymnastics Championships
- Venue: Aspire Dome
- Location: Doha, Qatar
- Start date: October 25, 2018
- End date: November 3, 2018

The 2018 Artistic Gymnastics World Championships was the 48th edition of the Artistic Gymnastics World Championships. The competition was held from October 25 – November 3, 2018, at the Aspire Academy Dome in Doha, Qatar.

It was the first time that the competition was held in the Middle East.

Simone Biles became the first American to medal on every event at a single World Championships and the first woman to do so in 31 years. The last person to complete this feat was Russian Yelena Shushunova in 1987.

== Competition schedule ==
Date	Sessions	Time	Subdivisions
Thursday, October 25	Opening ceremony		
Thursday, October 25	Men’s Qualifications		Subdivision 1 MAG
Thursday, October 25	Men’s Qualifications		Subdivision 2 MAG
Thursday, October 25	Men’s Qualifications		Subdivision 3 MAG
Friday, October 26	Men’s Qualifications		Subdivision 4 MAG
Friday, October 26	Men’s Qualifications		Subdivision 5 MAG
Friday, October 26	Men’s Qualifications		Subdivision 6 MAG
Saturday, October 27	Women’s Qualifications		Subdivision 1 WAG
Saturday, October 27	Women’s Qualifications		Subdivision 2 WAG
Saturday, October 27	Women’s Qualifications		Subdivision 3 WAG
Sunday, October 28	Women’s Qualifications		Subdivision 4 WAG
Sunday, October 28	Women’s Qualifications		Subdivision 5 WAG
Sunday, October 28	Women’s Qualifications		Subdivision 6 WAG
Monday, October 29	Men's Team Finals		-
Tuesday, October 30	Women's Team Finals		-
Wednesday, October 31	Men’s Individual All-Around Final		-
Thursday, November 1	Women’s Individual All-Around Final		-
Friday, November 2	Men’s and Women’s Apparatus Finals		MAG: Floor, pommel horse, rings
Friday, November 2	Men’s and Women’s Apparatus Finals		WAG: Vault, uneven bars
Saturday, November 3	Men’s and Women’s Apparatus Finals		MAG: Vault, parallel bars, horizontal bar
Saturday, November 3	Men’s and Women’s Apparatus Finals		WAG: Beam, floor
Saturday, November 3	Closing ceremony		

== Medal summary ==
=== Medalists ===
Event	Gold	Silver	Bronze
Men
Team	China; Deng Shudi; Lin Chaopan; Sun Wei; Xiao Ruoteng; Zou Jingyuan; Lan Xingyu	Russia; David Belyavskiy; Artur Dalaloyan; Nikolai Kuksenkov; Dmitrii Lankin; Nikita Nagornyy; Vladislav Poliashov	Japan; Kazuma Kaya; Kenzō Shirai; Yūsuke Tanaka; Wataru Tanigawa; Kōhei Uchimura; Kakeru Tanigawa
Individual all-around	(Russia) Artur Dalaloyan	(China) Xiao Ruoteng	(Russia) Nikita Nagornyy
Floor	(Russia) Artur Dalaloyan	(Japan) Kenzō Shirai	(Philippines) Carlos Yulo
Pommel horse	(China) Xiao Ruoteng	(United Kingdom) Max Whitlock	(Chinese Taipei) Lee Chih-kai
Rings	(Greece) Eleftherios Petrounias	(Brazil) Arthur Zanetti	(Italy) Marco Lodadio
Vault	(North Korea) Ri Se-gwang	(Russia) Artur Dalaloyan	(Japan) Kenzō Shirai
Parallel bars	(China) Zou Jingyuan	(Ukraine) Oleg Verniaiev	(Russia) Artur Dalaloyan
Horizontal bar	(Netherlands) Epke Zonderland	(Japan) Kōhei Uchimura	(United States) Sam Mikulak
Women
Team	United States; Simone Biles; Kara Eaker; Morgan Hurd; Grace McCallum; Riley McCusker; Ragan Smith	Russia; Lilia Akhaimova; Irina Alexeeva; Angelina Melnikova; Aliya Mustafina; Angelina Simakova; Daria Spiridonova	China; Chen Yile; Liu Jinru; Liu Tingting; Luo Huan; Zhang Jin; Du Siyu
Individual all-around	(United States) Simone Biles	(Japan) Mai Murakami	(United States) Morgan Hurd
Vault	(United States) Simone Biles	(Canada) Shallon Olsen	(Mexico) Alexa Moreno
Uneven bars	(Belgium) Nina Derwael	(United States) Simone Biles	(Germany) Elisabeth Seitz
Balance beam	(China) Liu Tingting	(Canada) Ana Padurariu	(United States) Simone Biles
Floor	(United States) Simone Biles	(United States) Morgan Hurd	(Japan) Mai Murakami

=== Medal standings ===
==== Overall ====
Rank	Nation	Gold	Silver	Bronze	Total
1	United States (USA)	4	2	3	9
2	China (CHN)	4	1	1	6
3	Russia (RUS)	2	3	2	7
4	Belgium (BEL)	1	0	0	1
4	Greece (GRE)	1	0	0	1
4	Netherlands (NED)	1	0	0	1
4	North Korea (PRK)	1	0	0	1
8	Japan (JPN)	0	3	3	6
9	Canada (CAN)	0	2	0	2
10	Brazil (BRA)	0	1	0	1
10	Great Britain (GBR)	0	1	0	1
10	Ukraine (UKR)	0	1	0	1
13	Chinese Taipei (TPE)	0	0	1	1
13	Germany (GER)	0	0	1	1
13	Italy (ITA)	0	0	1	1
13	Mexico (MEX)	0	0	1	1
13	Philippines (PHI)	0	0	1	1
Totals (17 entries)		14	14	14	42

==== Men ====
Rank	Nation	Gold	Silver	Bronze	Total
1	China (CHN)	3	1	0	4
2	Russia (RUS)	2	2	2	6
3	Greece (GRE)	1	0	0	1
3	Netherlands (NED)	1	0	0	1
3	North Korea (PRK)	1	0	0	1
6	Japan (JPN)	0	2	2	4
7	Brazil (BRA)	0	1	0	1
7	Great Britain (GBR)	0	1	0	1
7	Ukraine (UKR)	0	1	0	1
10	Chinese Taipei (TPE)	0	0	1	1
10	Italy (ITA)	0	0	1	1
10	Philippines (PHI)	0	0	1	1
10	United States (USA)	0	0	1	1
Totals (13 entries)		8	8	8	24

==== Women ====
Rank	Nation	Gold	Silver	Bronze	Total
1	United States (USA)	4	2	2	8
2	China (CHN)	1	0	1	2
3	Belgium (BEL)	1	0	0	1
4	Canada (CAN)	0	2	0	2
5	Japan (JPN)	0	1	1	2
6	Russia (RUS)	0	1	0	1
7	Germany (GER)	0	0	1	1
7	Mexico (MEX)	0	0	1	1
Totals (8 entries)		6	6	6	18

== Men's results ==
=== Team ===
The top 3 teams from the 2018 World Artistic Gymnastics Championships qualified to the 2020 Summer Olympic Games.

Oldest and youngest competitors

	Name	Country	Date of birth	Age
Youngest	Joe Fraser	Great Britain	December 6, 1998	19 years, 10 months and 23 days
Oldest	Epke Zonderland	Netherlands	April 16, 1986	32 years, 6 months and 13 days

Rank	Team	Floor (gymnastics)	Pommel horse	Rings (gymnastics)	Vault (gymnastics)	Parallel bars	Horizontal bar	Total
1st place, gold medalist(s)	China	40.798 (7)	41.898 (1)	42.873 (3)	44.432 (2)	46.133 (1)	40.500 (7)	256.634
1st place, gold medalist(s)	Deng Shudi	14.166		14.466		14.800		256.634
1st place, gold medalist(s)	Lin Chaopan	13.966			14.566	15.133	13.700	256.634
1st place, gold medalist(s)	Sun Wei		13.066	14.341	14.900		14.200	256.634
1st place, gold medalist(s)	Xiao Ruoteng	12.666	14.166	14.066	14.966		12.600	256.634
1st place, gold medalist(s)	Zou Jingyuan		14.666			16.200		256.634
2nd place, silver medalist(s)	Russia	43.199 (1)	40.465 (5)	43.691 (1)	44.565 (1)	43.266 (2)	41.399 (5)	256.585
2nd place, silver medalist(s)	David Belyavskiy		14.066			14.700	13.700	256.585
2nd place, silver medalist(s)	Artur Dalaloyan	14.666		14.533	15.066	13.800	13.966	256.585
2nd place, silver medalist(s)	Nikolai Kuksenkov		13.266					256.585
2nd place, silver medalist(s)	Dmitrii Lankin	13.933		14.600	14.466			256.585
2nd place, silver medalist(s)	Nikita Nagornyy	14.600	13.133	14.558	15.033	14.766	13.733	256.585
3rd place, bronze medalist(s)	Japan	42.099 (4)	41.733 (2)	42.549 (4)	44.132 (3)	40.632 (7)	42.599 (1)	253.744
3rd place, bronze medalist(s)	Kazuma Kaya	14.300	14.000	14.166	14.366			253.744
3rd place, bronze medalist(s)	Kenzō Shirai	14.933			14.966		13.966	253.744
3rd place, bronze medalist(s)	Yūsuke Tanaka					11.566	14.233	253.744
3rd place, bronze medalist(s)	Wataru Tanigawa	12.866	13.600	14.183	14.800	14.566		253.744
3rd place, bronze medalist(s)	Kōhei Uchimura		14.133	14.200		14.500	14.400	253.744
4	United States	42.966 (2)	40.632 (3)	41.465 (6)	43.732 (5)	41.699 (4)	41.500 (3)	251.994
4	Sam Mikulak	14.333	13.033	14.266	14.366	14.833	14.500	251.994
4	Akash Modi			13.833		12.866	13.600	251.994
4	Yul Moldauer	14.600	13.566	13.366	14.633	14.000		251.994
4	Colin Van Wicklen	14.033			14.733		13.400	251.994
4	Alec Yoder		14.033					251.994
5	Great Britain	42.599 (3)	40.499 (4)	41.766 (5)	43.900 (4)	40.799 (6)	39.065 (8)	248.628
5	Brinn Bevan	14.033		13.800	14.800	12.866	11.966	248.628
5	Dominick Cunningham	14.166			14.700			248.628
5	Joe Fraser		13.300	13.866		13.700	13.466	248.628
5	James Hall		11.966	14.100	14.400	14.233	13.633	248.628
5	Max Whitlock	14.400	15.233					248.628
6	Switzerland	41.299 (6)	37.132 (7)	41.065 (7)	41.399 (8)	42.266 (3)	41.133 (6)	244.294
6	Christian Baumann		12.300	13.633		14.333	13.500	244.294
6	Pablo Brägger	14.066			12.433	14.000	13.433	244.294
6	Benjamin Gischard	13.933	13.066	13.366	14.433			244.294
6	Oliver Hegi		11.766			13.933	14.200	244.294
6	Eddy Yusof	13.300		14.066	14.533			244.294
7	Brazil	41.932 (5)	35.899 (8)	42.899 (2)	42.057 (7)	39.674 (8)	41.533 (2)	243.994
7	Francisco Barretto Júnior		13.666			13.408	13.800	243.994
7	Lucas Bitencourt		12.633	13.666		13.333		243.994
7	Arthur Mariano	14.166	9.600		14.233		14.200	243.994
7	Caio Souza	13.900		14.200	14.191	12.933	13.533	243.994
7	Arthur Zanetti	13.866		15.033	13.633			243.994
8	Netherlands	38.432 (8)	38.066 (6)	38.898 (8)	42.466 (6)	41.299 (5)	41.499 (4)	240.660
8	Bart Deurloo	13.700	12.400	13.666	14.166		14.000	240.660
8	Bram Louwije		13.033		13.800			240.660
8	Frank Rijken	10.666		12.966		13.733	13.166	240.660
8	Casimir Schmidt	14.066	12.633	12.266	14.500	13.633		240.660
8	Epke Zonderland					13.933	14.333	240.660

=== Individual all-around ===
Defending champion Xiao Ruoteng of China lost the title on a tiebreaker to Russia's Artur Dalaloyan. The tie-breaking procedure in this situation is dropping of the lowest-scoring apparatus from the combined score, and whoever's total score on the remaining five apparatuses is higher after that will rank ahead (74.198 versus 73.465). Dalaloyan became the first Russian man to win the all-around title since Nikolai Kryukov in 1999; they were at that time the only two Russian men to have won the title in the post-Soviet era. Last year's silver medalist, China's Lin Chaopan, failed to reach the final after finishing behind teammates Xiao and Sun Wei in qualifying. Reigning bronze medalist Kenzō Shirai of Japan finished in seventh place after some weaker and lower-scoring apparatuses, namely pommel horse.

Canada's René Cournoyer withdrew prior to the competition and was replaced by first reserve Artur Davtyan of Armenia.

Oldest and youngest competitors

	Name	Country	Date of birth	Age
Youngest	Carlos Yulo	Philippines	February 16, 2000	18 years, 8 months and 15 days
Oldest	Marcel Nguyen	Germany	September 8, 1987	31 years, 1 month and 23 days

Rank	Gymnast	Floor (gymnastics)	Pommel horse	Rings (gymnastics)	Vault (gymnastics)	Parallel bars	Horizontal bar	Total
1st place, gold medalist(s)	(Russia) Artur Dalaloyan	14.800	13.400	14.533	15.133	15.566	14.166	87.598
2nd place, silver medalist(s)	(China) Xiao Ruoteng	14.133	14.700	14.333	14.866	15.333	14.233	87.598
3rd place, bronze medalist(s)	(Russia) Nikita Nagornyy	14.733	13.566	14.500	14.766	14.866	13.900	86.331
4	(China) Sun Wei	13.633	14.766	13.900	14.533	14.800	14.266	85.898
5	(United States) Sam Mikulak	14.400	14.300	14.166	14.600	15.441	12.366	85.273
6	(Japan) Kazuma Kaya	13.800	14.100	14.000	14.366	14.766	13.733	84.765
7	(Japan) Kenzō Shirai	14.900	12.533	13.666	15.166	14.266	14.000	84.531
8	(United Kingdom) James Hall	14.100	13.666	14.066	14.366	14.500	13.600	84.298
9	(Armenia) Artur Davtyan	13.700	13.800	14.341	14.733	13.766	12.800	83.140
10	(Cyprus) Marios Georgiou	13.533	13.300	13.600	13.766	14.400	13.433	82.032
11	(Spain) Néstor Abad	13.800	13.166	13.433	13.833	14.000	13.733	81.965
12	(United States) Yul Moldauer	14.333	12.200	13.466	14.400	14.500	13.033	81.932
13	(Brazil) Caio Souza	13.566	11.700	13.933	14.616	14.383	13.600	81.798
14	(Ukraine) Oleg Verniaiev	12.966	12.400	14.066	14.966	15.666	11.500	81.564
15	(Turkey) Ahmet Önder	13.966	11.666	13.866	14.233	14.666	13.166	81.563
16	(Switzerland) Oliver Hegi	13.366	11.916	12.400	14.000	14.666	14.133	80.481
17	(South Korea) Park Min-soo	12.166	13.633	13.766	13.816	13.200	13.533	80.114
18	(United Kingdom) Brinn Bevan	14.366	11.633	13.666	13.533	14.600	11.766	79.564
19	(Turkey) Ferhat Arıcan	13.166	11.525	13.000	13.966	14.600	12.900	79.157
20	(Germany) Marcel Nguyen	14.000	11.533	14.066	12.833	14.100	12.600	79.132
21	(Switzerland) Pablo Brägger	14.133	11.933	13.200	14.200	12.000	13.566	79.032
22	(Romania) Andrei Muntean	12.333	9.833	14.125	14.433	14.650	13.000	78.374
23	(Philippines) Carlos Yulo	14.666	12.600	12.000	13.100	14.166	10.933	77.464
24	(Germany) Lukas Dauser	13.566	12.033	12.166	13.666	12.433	12.866	76.730

=== Floor ===
Oldest and youngest competitors

	Name	Country	Date of birth	Age
Youngest	Carlos Yulo	Philippines	February 16, 2000	18 years, 8 months and 17 days
Oldest	Sam Mikulak	United States	October 13, 1992	26 years and 20 days

Rank	Gymnast	D Score	E Score	Pen.	Total
1st place, gold medalist(s)	(Russia) Artur Dalaloyan	6.200	8.700		14.900
2nd place, silver medalist(s)	(Japan) Kenzō Shirai	6.800	8.066		14.866
3rd place, bronze medalist(s)	(Philippines) Carlos Yulo	6.200	8.400		14.600
4	(United States) Yul Moldauer	5.800	8.766		14.566
5	(Israel) Artem Dolgopyat	6.400	8.166		14.566
6	(Russia) Nikita Nagornyy	6.400	8.100		14.500
7	(United States) Sam Mikulak	5.700	8.533		14.233
8	(Japan) Kazuma Kaya	5.800	8.300		14.100
9	(Turkey) Ahmet Önder	6.000	7.833		13.833

=== Pommel horse ===
Oldest and youngest competitors

	Name	Country	Date of birth	Age
Youngest	Nariman Kurbanov	Kazakhstan	December 6, 1997	20 years, 10 months and 27 days
Oldest	Cyril Tommasone	France	July 4, 1987	31 years, 3 months and 29 days

Rank	Gymnast	D Score	E Score	Pen.	Total
1st place, gold medalist(s)	(China) Xiao Ruoteng	6.600	8.566		15.166
2nd place, silver medalist(s)	(United Kingdom) Max Whitlock	6.800	8.366		15.166
3rd place, bronze medalist(s)	(Chinese Taipei) Lee Chih-kai	6.300	8.666		14.966
4	(United States) Sam Mikulak	5.800	8.533		14.333
5	(Kazakhstan) Nariman Kurbanov	6.200	7.200		13.400
6	(Russia) Nikita Nagornyy	5.900	6.633		12.533
7	(Russia) David Belyavskiy	4.800	7.033		11.833
8	(France) Cyril Tommasone	5.800	5.700		11.500

=== Rings ===
Oldest and youngest competitors

	Name	Country	Date of birth	Age
Youngest	Nikita Nagornyy	Russia	February 12, 1997	21 years, 8 months and 21 days
Oldest	Vahagn Davtyan	Armenia	August 19, 1988	30 years, 2 months and 14 days

Rank	Gymnast	D Score	E Score	Pen.	Total
1st place, gold medalist(s)	(Greece) Eleftherios Petrounias	6.300	9.066		15.366
2nd place, silver medalist(s)	(Brazil) Arthur Zanetti	6.200	8.900		15.100
3rd place, bronze medalist(s)	(Italy) Marco Lodadio	6.300	8.600		14.900
4	(Armenia) Artur Tovmasyan	6.100	8.666		14.766
5	(Russia) Nikita Nagornyy	6.000	8.733		14.733
6	(Armenia) Vahagn Davtyan	6.100	8.633		14.733
7	(Azerbaijan) Nikita Simonov	6.000	8.266		14.266
8	(Ukraine) Igor Radivilov	6.300	7.833		14.133

=== Vault ===
Oldest and youngest competitors

	Name	Country	Date of birth	Age
Youngest	Nikita Nagornyy	Russia	February 12, 1997	21 years, 8 months and 22 days
Oldest	Ri Se-gwang	North Korea	January 21, 1985	33 years, 9 months and 13 days

Position	Gymnast	Vault 1				Vault 2				Total
Position	Gymnast	D Score	E Score	Pen.	Score 1	D Score	E Score	Pen.	Score 2	Total
1st place, gold medalist(s)	(North Korea) Ri Se-gwang	6.000	8.933		14.933	6.000	8.933		14.933	14.933
2nd place, silver medalist(s)	(Russia) Artur Dalaloyan	5.600	9.266		14.866	5.600	9.300		14.900	14.883
3rd place, bronze medalist(s)	(Japan) Kenzō Shirai	5.600	9.150		14.750	5.200	9.400		14.600	14.675
4	(United Kingdom) Dominick Cunningham	5.400	9.133		14.533	5.600	9.200		14.800	14.666
5	(Russia) Nikita Nagornyy	5.600	9.200		14.800	5.600	8.900		14.500	14.650
6	(Hong Kong) Shek Wai Hung	5.600	9.133		14.733	5.600	8.700	0.300	14.000	14.366
7	(Armenia) Artur Davtyan	5.600	8.833		14.433	5.600	8.133	0.300	13.433	13.933
8	(Brazil) Caio Souza	5.600	9.033		14.633	5.600	7.833	0.300	13.133	13.883

=== Parallel bars ===
Oldest and youngest competitors

	Name	Country	Date of birth	Age
Youngest	Zou Jingyuan	China	January 3, 1998	20 years and 10 months
Oldest	David Belyavskiy	Russia	February 23, 1992	26 years, 8 months and 11 days

Rank	Gymnast	D Score	E Score	Pen.	Total
1st place, gold medalist(s)	(China) Zou Jingyuan	7.000	9.433		16.433
2nd place, silver medalist(s)	(Ukraine) Oleg Verniaiev	6.700	8.891		15.591
3rd place, bronze medalist(s)	(Russia) Artur Dalaloyan	6.400	8.966		15.366
4	(United States) Sam Mikulak	6.400	8.833		15.233
5	(China) Lin Chaopan	6.400	8.800		15.200
6	(Colombia) Jossimar Calvo	6.500	8.533		15.033
7	(Russia) David Belyavskiy	6.400	8.233		14.633
8	(Germany) Lukas Dauser	6.000	7.733		13.733

=== Horizontal bar ===
Oldest and youngest competitors

	Name	Country	Date of birth	Age
Youngest	Tang Chia-hung	Chinese Taipei	September 23, 1996	22 years, 1 month and 11 days
Oldest	Epke Zonderland	Netherlands	April 16, 1986	32 years, 6 months and 18 days

Rank	Gymnast	D Score	E Score	Pen.	Total
1st place, gold medalist(s)	(Netherlands) Epke Zonderland	6.800	8.300		15.100
2nd place, silver medalist(s)	(Japan) Kōhei Uchimura	6.400	8.400		14.800
3rd place, bronze medalist(s)	(United States) Sam Mikulak	6.100	8.433		14.533
4	(Croatia) Tin Srbić	6.400	8.100		14.500
5	(Chinese Taipei) Tang Chia-hung	6.100	8.166		14.266
6	(China) Deng Shudi	6.400	7.666		14.066
7	(China) Xiao Ruoteng	6.100	7.800		13.900
8	(Russia) Artur Dalaloyan	5.200	7.466		12.666

== Women's results ==
=== Team ===
The top 3 teams from the 2018 World Artistic Gymnastics Championships qualify to the 2020 Summer Olympic Games.

Oldest and youngest competitors

	Name	Country	Date of birth	Age
Youngest	Kara Eaker	United States	November 7, 2002	15 years, 11 months and 23 days
Oldest	Kim Bui	Germany	January 20, 1989	29 years, 9 months and 10 days

Rank	Team	Vault (gymnastics)	Uneven bars	Balance beam	Floor (gymnastics)	Total
1st place, gold medalist(s)	United States	44.666 (1)	43.799 (1)	41.799 (1)	41.365 (1)	171.629
1st place, gold medalist(s)	Simone Biles	15.500	14.866	13.733	14.766	171.629
1st place, gold medalist(s)	Kara Eaker			14.333		171.629
1st place, gold medalist(s)	Morgan Hurd	14.633	14.433		12.966	171.629
1st place, gold medalist(s)	Grace McCallum	14.533			13.633	171.629
1st place, gold medalist(s)	Riley McCusker		14.500	13.733		171.629
2nd place, silver medalist(s)	Russia	41.133 (7)	42.666 (2)	39.932 (2)	39.132 (5)	162.863
2nd place, silver medalist(s)	Lilia Akhaimova	13.233			13.100	162.863
2nd place, silver medalist(s)	Irina Alexeeva	13.600	14.000	13.500		162.863
2nd place, silver medalist(s)	Angelina Melnikova	14.300	14.166		12.966	162.863
2nd place, silver medalist(s)	Aliya Mustafina		14.500	13.266	13.066	162.863
2nd place, silver medalist(s)	Angelina Simakova			13.166		162.863
3rd place, bronze medalist(s)	China	42.332 (4)	41.966 (4)	38.999 (5)	39.099 (6)	162.396
3rd place, bronze medalist(s)	Chen Yile		14.100	12.833	12.900	162.396
3rd place, bronze medalist(s)	Liu Jinru	14.366				162.396
3rd place, bronze medalist(s)	Liu Tingting		13.400	13.766		162.396
3rd place, bronze medalist(s)	Luo Huan	13.533	14.466		12.866	162.396
3rd place, bronze medalist(s)	Zhang Jin	14.433		12.400	13.333	162.396
4	Canada	43.782 (2)	39.498 (7)	38.899 (6)	39.465 (4)	161.644
4	Ellie Black	14.566	13.566	13.633	13.266	161.644
4	Sophie Marois	14.416				161.644
4	Brooklyn Moors		13.066		13.233	161.644
4	Shallon Olsen	14.800		12.333	12.966	161.644
4	Ana Padurariu		12.866	12.933		161.644
5	France	41.866 (5)	41.465 (5)	39.898 (3)	38.065 (8)	161.294
5	Juliette Bossu		14.033			161.294
5	Marine Boyer	13.700		13.966	13.166	161.294
5	Lorette Charpy		13.366	13.366		161.294
5	Mélanie de Jesus dos Santos	14.633	14.033	12.566	13.433	161.294
5	Louise Vanhille	13.533			11.466	161.294
6	Japan	41.333 (6)	38.832 (6)	39.165 (4)	39.932 (3)	160.262
6	Hitomi Hatakeda	14.033	13.866	12.366	12.833	160.262
6	Nagi Kajita					160.262
6	Mai Murakami	14.600	13.133	13.766	13.766	160.262
6	Aiko Sugihara					160.262
6	Asuka Teramoto	12.700	12.833	13.033	13.333	160.262
7	Brazil	43.666 (3)	37.665 (8)	38.366 (7)	40.133 (2)	159.830
7	Rebeca Andrade	14.633	12.966	13.300		159.830
7	Jade Barbosa	14.600	12.233	11.466	13.100	159.830
7	Thaís Fidélis				13.233	159.830
7	Lorrane Oliveira					159.830
7	Flávia Saraiva	14.433	12.466	13.600	13.800	159.830
8	Germany	40.765 (8)	42.232 (3)	38.032 (8)	38.399 (7)	159.428
8	Kim Bui	13.466	14.133		12.866	159.428
8	Leah Griesser			12.066	12.700	159.428
8	Sophie Scheder		13.766	12.366		159.428
8	Elisabeth Seitz	13.733	14.333		12.833	159.428
8	Sarah Voss	13.566		13.600		159.428

=== Individual all-around ===
Simone Biles of the United States won an unprecedented fourth all-around title on the women's side. Teammate and defending champion Morgan Hurd placed third. Japan's Mai Murakami recorded her country's highest-ever finish in the all-around, and her silver was Japan's first all-around medal on the women's side since Kōko Tsurumi's bronze in 2009. Reigning silver medalist Ellie Black of Canada finished twelfth. The 2017 bronze medalist, Russia's Elena Eremina, was unable to compete due to a back injury. This final was one of the most closely contested of all time, with less than two tenths of a point separating the second- to sixth-place gymnasts.

Oldest and youngest competitors

	Name	Country	Date of birth	Age
Youngest	Irina Alexeeva	Russia	April 20, 2002	16 years, 6 months and 12 days
Oldest	Jade Barbosa	Brazil	July 1, 1991	27 years and 4 months

Rank	Gymnast	Vault (gymnastics)	Uneven bars	Balance beam	Floor (gymnastics)	Total
1st place, gold medalist(s)	(United States) Simone Biles	14.533	14.725	13.233	15.000	57.491
2nd place, silver medalist(s)	(Japan) Mai Murakami	14.566	13.566	13.666	14.000	55.798
3rd place, bronze medalist(s)	(United States) Morgan Hurd	14.600	14.333	12.933	13.866	55.732
4	(Belgium) Nina Derwael	13.566	15.100	13.733	13.300	55.699
5	(Russia) Angelina Melnikova	14.166	14.433	13.466	13.633	55.698
6	(France) Mélanie de Jesus dos Santos	14.566	13.500	13.733	13.800	55.599
7	(China) Chen Yile	13.433	14.000	14.166	13.033	54.632
8	(Brazil) Flávia Saraiva	14.533	13.000	13.000	13.833	54.366
9	(China) Luo Huan	13.466	14.400	13.466	13.000	54.332
10	(Japan) Asuka Teramoto	14.633	13.733	12.900	13.033	54.299
11	(United Kingdom) Ellie Downie	14.400	13.900	12.700	13.233	54.233
12	(Canada) Ellie Black	14.400	12.900	13.600	13.233	54.133
13	(Russia) Irina Alexeeva	13.633	13.866	13.366	12.933	53.798
14	(Netherlands) Naomi Visser	13.466	13.800	13.033	13.033	53.332
15	(Brazil) Jade Barbosa	14.500	13.333	12.933	12.100	52.866
16	(France) Lorette Charpy	13.333	12.900	13.000	12.833	52.066
17	(Romania) Denisa Golgotă	14.300	12.666	11.566	13.333	51.865
18	(Belgium) Axelle Klinckaert	13.700	13.066	12.266	12.800	51.832
19	(United Kingdom) Kelly Simm	13.900	13.900	11.533	12.466	51.799
20	(Hungary) Zsófia Kovács	13.600	13.133	12.966	12.066	51.765
21	(Germany) Elisabeth Seitz	13.700	14.600	10.400	12.866	51.566
22	(Italy) Lara Mori	13.400	12.766	12.233	13.133	51.532
23	(Spain) Ana Pérez	13.566	12.900	12.366	12.500	51.332
24	(Canada) Brooklyn Moors	13.300	12.566	11.100	13.366	50.332

=== Vault ===
Oldest and youngest competitors

	Name	Country	Date of birth	Age
Youngest	Yeo Seo-jeong	South Korea	February 20, 2002	16 years, 8 months and 13 days
Oldest	Oksana Chusovitina	Uzbekistan	June 19, 1975	43 years, 4 months and 14 days

Position	Gymnast	Vault 1				Vault 2				Total
Position	Gymnast	D Score	E Score	Pen.	Score 1	D Score	E Score	Pen.	Score 2	Total
1st place, gold medalist(s)	(United States) Simone Biles	6.000	9.266		15.266	5.800	9.666		15.466	15.366
2nd place, silver medalist(s)	(Canada) Shallon Olsen	6.000	8.600		14.600	5.400	9.033		14.433	14.516
3rd place, bronze medalist(s)	(Mexico) Alexa Moreno	5.800	8.800		14.600	5.600	8.916	0.100	14.416	14.508
4	(Uzbekistan) Oksana Chusovitina	5.800	8.600		14.400	5.200	9.000		14.200	14.300
5	(South Korea) Yeo Seo-jeong	5.800	8.833	0.100	14.533	5.400	8.533		13.933	14.233
6	(China) Liu Jinru	5.600	8.600	0.100	14.100	5.800	8.400		14.200	14.150
7	(Canada) Ellie Black	5.400	8.600		14.000	5.200	9.033		14.233	14.116
8	(North Korea) Pyon Rye-yong	5.800	7.566	0.300	13.066	5.800	8.366		14.166	13.616

=== Uneven bars ===
Oldest and youngest competitors

	Name	Country	Date of birth	Age
Youngest	Morgan Hurd	United States	July 18, 2001	17 years, 3 months and 15 days
Oldest	Becky Downie	Great Britain	January 24, 1992	26 years, 9 months and 9 days

Rank	Gymnast	D Score	E Score	Pen.	Total
1st place, gold medalist(s)	(Belgium) Nina Derwael	6.500	8.700		15.200
2nd place, silver medalist(s)	(United States) Simone Biles	6.200	8.500		14.700
3rd place, bronze medalist(s)	(Germany) Elisabeth Seitz	6.200	8.400		14.600
4	(China) Luo Huan	6.000	8.500		14.500
5	(Russia) Aliya Mustafina	5.800	8.633		14.433
6	(United States) Morgan Hurd	6.100	8.333		14.433
7	(United Kingdom) Becky Downie	6.100	7.233		13.333
8	(Sweden) Jonna Adlerteg	6.200	6.966		13.166

=== Balance beam ===
Oldest and youngest competitors

	Name	Country	Date of birth	Age
Youngest	Kara Eaker	United States	November 7, 2002	15 years, 11 months and 27 days
Oldest	Sanne Wevers	Netherlands	September 17, 1991	27 years, 1 month and 17 days

Rank	Gymnast	D Score	E Score	Pen.	Total
1st place, gold medalist(s)	(China) Liu Tingting	6.300	8.233		14.533
2nd place, silver medalist(s)	(Canada) Ana Padurariu	6.000	8.100		14.100
3rd place, bronze medalist(s)	(United States) Simone Biles	6.200	7.400		13.600
4	(Belgium) Nina Derwael	5.400	8.066		13.466
5	(Canada) Ellie Black	4.800	8.233		13.033
6	(United States) Kara Eaker	6.200	6.733	0.100	12.833
7	(Netherlands) Sanne Wevers	5.300	7.366		12.666
8	(China) Zhang Jin	5.300	6.200		11.500

=== Floor ===
Oldest and youngest competitors

	Name	Country	Date of birth	Age
Youngest	Morgan Hurd	United States	July 18, 2001	17 years, 3 months and 16 days
Oldest	Mai Murakami	Japan	August 5, 1996	22 years, 2 months and 29 days

Rank	Gymnast	D Score	E Score	Pen.	Total
1st place, gold medalist(s)	(United States) Simone Biles	6.700	8.533	0.300	14.933
2nd place, silver medalist(s)	(United States) Morgan Hurd	5.500	8.433		13.933
3rd place, bronze medalist(s)	(Japan) Mai Murakami	5.700	8.166		13.866
4	(Russia) Angelina Melnikova	5.700	8.133		13.833
5	(Brazil) Flávia Saraiva	5.500	8.366	0.100	13.766
6	(France) Mélanie de Jesus dos Santos	5.500	8.233	0.300	13.433
7	(Russia) Lilia Akhaimova	5.800	7.566		13.366
8	(Canada) Brooklyn Moors	5.400	7.666		13.066

== Qualification ==
=== Men's results ===
==== Team ====
Rank	Team	Floor (gymnastics)	Pommel horse	Rings (gymnastics)	Vault (gymnastics)	Parallel bars	Horizontal bar	Total	Qual.
1	Russia	43.533 (1)	40.966 (1)	43.033 (2)	43.765 (2)	45.040 (2)	42.065 (2)	258.402	Q
1	David Belyavskiy	12.500	14.000	13.533	14.333	15.033	13.933	258.402	Q
1	Artur Dalaloyan	14.833	11.766	14.100	14.666	15.041	14.166	258.402	Q
1	Nikolai Kuksenkov		12.966				13.300	258.402	Q
1	Dmitrii Lankin	13.900		14.300	14.366	14.733		258.402	Q
1	Nikita Nagornyy	14.800	14.000	14.633	14.733	14.966	13.966	258.402	Q
2	China	41.566 (11)	40.940 (2)	42.232 (5)	44.299 (1)	46.066 (1)	42.733 (1)	257.836	Q
2	Deng Shudi	14.166		14.166	14.666		14.300	257.836	Q
2	Lin Chaopan	12.933	12.866	13.833	14.600	15.266	13.966	257.836	Q
2	Sun Wei	13.200	13.441	13.933	14.700	14.733	14.000	257.836	Q
2	Xiao Ruoteng	14.200	14.633	14.133	14.933	15.000	14.433	257.836	Q
2	Zou Jingyuan		12.366			15.800		257.836	Q
3	Japan	43.199 (2)	38.357 (7)	41.866 (8)	43.533 (3)	44.324 (4)	42.033 (3)	253.312	Q
3	Kazuma Kaya	14.333	12.425	13.966	14.200	14.691	13.300	253.312	Q
3	Kenzō Shirai	14.833	12.966	13.733	14.733	14.466	13.133	253.312	Q
3	Yūsuke Tanaka	13.766			–	14.833	14.133	253.312	Q
3	Wataru Tanigawa	14.033	11.000	14.000	14.600	14.800		253.312	Q
3	Kōhei Uchimura		12.966	13.900			14.600	253.312	Q
4	United States	42.699 (3)	38.833 (6)	41.466 (9)	43.199 (6)	43.233 (6)	40.932 (6)	250.362	Q
4	Sam Mikulak	14.333	14.133	14.200	14.333	15.033	14.566	250.362	Q
4	Akash Modi		12.000	13.766	14.233	12.900	13.166	250.362	Q
4	Yul Moldauer	14.433	11.500	13.233	14.266	14.500	12.433	250.362	Q
4	Colin Van Wicklen	13.933			14.600		13.200	250.362	Q
4	Alec Yoder	12.666	12.700	13.500		13.700		250.362	Q
5	Great Britain	42.415 (4)	40.599 (3)	41.400 (11)	43.432 (4)	42.891 (7)	39.099 (16)	249.836	Q
5	Brinn Bevan	13.733	12.600	13.600	14.600	14.525	12.233	249.836	Q
5	Dominick Cunningham	14.116		13.466	14.466	13.866	12.733	249.836	Q
5	Joe Fraser		11.983	13.700	12.266	13.900	13.466	249.836	Q
5	James Hall	14.333	13.033	14.100	14.366	14.466	12.900	249.836	Q
5	Max Whitlock	13.966	14.966					249.836	Q
6	Brazil	40.765 (18)	36.966 (12)	42.299 (4)	43.333 (5)	42.332 (10)	41.266 (5)	246.961	Q
6	Francisco Barretto Júnior		13.500	12.833		13.533	14.000	246.961	Q
6	Lucas Bitencourt	13.266	10.700	12.766	14.200	13.633	11.400	246.961	Q
6	Arthur Mariano	13.966	12.300		14.500	13.933	13.466	246.961	Q
6	Caio Souza	13.533	11.166	14.433	14.633	14.766	13.800	246.961	Q
6	Arthur Zanetti	13.066		15.033	14.166			246.961	Q
7	Netherlands	41.500 (13)	37.533 (9)	40.233 (16)	42.332 (13)	42.632 (8)	41.433 (4)	245.663	Q
7	Bart Deurloo	13.700	12.600	13.600	14.266		14.033	245.663	Q
7	Bram Louwije	13.000	12.600	11.800	13.666	13.866	12.866	245.663	Q
7	Frank Rijken	13.600	10.233	13.200	–	14.033	13.000	245.663	Q
7	Casimir Schmidt	14.200	12.333	13.433	14.400	13.966		245.663	Q
7	Epke Zonderland					14.633	14.400	245.663	Q
8	Switzerland	41.865 (6)	39.099 (5)	40.133 (17)	41.824 (23)	41.599 (16)	40.666 (8)	245.186	Q
8	Christian Baumann		12.633	13.400		13.200	13.600	245.186	Q
8	Pablo Brägger	14.066	12.966	13.333	12.900	14.333	13.166	245.186	Q
8	Benjamin Gischard	14.233	11.900		14.400			245.186	Q
8	Oliver Hegi	13.566	13.500	13.133	13.916	12.800	13.333	245.186	Q
8	Eddy Yusof	13.133		13.400	13.508	14.066	13.733	245.186	Q
9	Ukraine	40.365 (21)	37.099 (10)	41.432 (10)	41.599 (28)	44.358 (3)	38.798 (18)	243.651	R1
9	Vladyslav Hryko	11.466	12.900	13.333	13.500	14.100	12.966	243.651	R1
9	Petro Pakhniuk		12.933	13.266		14.800	13.466	243.651	R1
9	Igor Radivilov	12.633		14.733	12.466			243.651	R1
9	Maksym Vasylenko	13.966	11.266		13.733	13.433	12.266	243.651	R1
9	Oleg Verniaiev	13.766	11.200	13.366	14.366	15.458	12.366	243.651	R1
10	Germany	39.898 (24)	36.041 (18)	42.166 (6)	41.899 (19)	43.799 (5)	38.132 (22)	241.935	R2
10	Lukas Dauser	13.266	11.808	13.333	13.766	14.933	13.433	241.935	R2
10	Philipp Herder	12.466	12.200			14.300	12.766	241.935	R2
10	Nick Klessing	11.300		13.900	14.233			241.935	R2
10	Marcel Nguyen	14.166	11.233	14.133	13.666	14.566	11.933	241.935	R2
10	Andreas Toba		12.033	14.133	13.900	13.800	11.800	241.935	R2

==== Individual all-around ====
Rank	Gymnast	Floor (gymnastics)	Pommel horse	Rings (gymnastics)	Vault (gymnastics)	Parallel bars	Horizontal bar	Total	Qual.
1	(China) Xiao Ruoteng	14.200	14.633	14.133	14.933	15.000	14.433	87.332	Q
2	(Russia) Nikita Nagornyy	14.800	14.000	14.633	14.733	14.966	13.966	87.098	Q
3	(United States) Sam Mikulak	14.333	14.133	14.200	14.333	15.033	14.566	86.598	Q
4	(Russia) Artur Dalaloyan	14.833	11.766	14.100	14.666	15.041	14.166	84.572	Q
5	(China) Sun Wei	13.200	13.441	13.933	14.700	14.733	14.000	84.007	Q
6	(Japan) Kenzō Shirai	14.833	12.966	13.733	14.733	14.466	13.133	83.864	Q
7	(China) Lin Chaopan	12.933	12.866	13.833	14.600	15.266	13.966	83.464	–
8	(Russia) David Belyavskiy	12.500	14.000	13.533	14.333	15.033	13.933	83.332	–
9	(United Kingdom) James Hall	14.333	13.033	14.100	14.366	14.466	12.900	83.198	Q
10	(Japan) Kazuma Kaya	14.333	12.425	13.966	14.200	14.691	13.300	82.915	Q
11	(Brazil) Caio Souza	13.533	11.166	14.433	14.633	14.766	13.800	82.331	Q
12	(Spain) Néstor Abad	13.700	12.400	13.666	13.700	14.175	13.866	81.507	Q
13	(United Kingdom) Brinn Bevan	13.733	12.600	13.600	14.600	14.525	12.233	81.291	Q
14	(Philippines) Carlos Yulo	14.766	12.166	13.700	14.666	14.366	11.566	81.230	Q
15	(Turkey) Ahmet Önder	14.533	12.000	13.866	14.300	14.300	12.000	80.999	Q
16	(Switzerland) Pablo Brägger	14.066	12.966	13.333	12.900	14.333	13.166	80.764	Q
17	(Germany) Lukas Dauser	13.266	11.808	13.333	13.766	14.933	13.433	80.539	Q
18	(Ukraine) Oleg Verniaiev	13.766	11.200	13.366	14.366	15.458	12.366	80.522	Q
19	(United States) Yul Moldauer	14.433	11.500	13.233	14.266	14.500	12.433	80.365	Q
20	(Switzerland) Oliver Hegi	13.566	13.500	13.133	13.916	12.800	13.333	80.248	Q
21	(Romania) Andrei Muntean	13.500	10.800	13.858	14.433	14.400	13.233	80.224	Q
22	(South Korea) Park Min-soo	13.700	13.500	13.766	13.533	13.766	11.700	79.965	Q
23	(Canada) René Cournoyer	13.666	11.366	13.400	13.933	13.733	13.600	79.698	Q
24	(Germany) Marcel Nguyen	14.166	11.233	14.133	13.666	14.566	11.933	79.697	Q
25	(Turkey) Ferhat Arıcan	13.300	11.966	12.533	14.400	14.866	12.400	79.465	Q
26	(Cyprus) Marios Georgiou	13.700	12.433	13.300	13.533	12.566	13.800	79.332	Q
27	(Armenia) Artur Davtyan	13.666	11.366	13.866	14.700	13.600	12.133	79.331	R1
28	(Italy) Ludovico Edalli	13.333	11.633	13.200	13.400	14.200	13.333	79.099	R2
29	(France) Loris Frasca	14.200	10.100	13.433	14.833	13.633	12.700	78.899	R3
30	(Belarus) Andrey Likhovitskiy	13.000	12.533	12.600	13.200	14.100	13.433	78.866	R4

==== Floor ====
Rank	Gymnast	D Score	E Score	Pen.	Total	Qual.
1	(Russia) Artur Dalaloyan	6.200	8.633		14.833	Q
2	(Japan) Kenzō Shirai	6.800	8.033		14.833	Q
3	(Russia) Nikita Nagornyy	6.400	8.400		14.800	Q
4	(Philippines) Carlos Yulo	6.200	8.566		14.766	Q
5	(Turkey) Ahmet Önder	6.000	8.533		14.533	Q
6	(United States) Yul Moldauer	5.800	8.633		14.433	Q
7	(Israel) Artem Dolgopyat	6.400	8.000		14.400	Q
8	(Japan) Kazuma Kaya	5.700	8.633		14.333	Q
8	(United States) Sam Mikulak	5.700	8.633		14.333	Q
10	(United Kingdom) James Hall	5.900	8.433		14.333	R1
11	(Switzerland) Benjamin Gischard	6.000	8.233		14.233	R2
12	(France) Loris Frasca	5.900	8.300		14.200	R3

Although Artur Dalaloyan of Russia and Kenzō Shirai of Japan both posted the top combined score (14.833) in qualifications, Dalaloyan placed ahead after applying the tie-breaking procedure because he posted a higher E-score than Shirai (8.633 versus 8.033). The same situation with the score (14.333) happened for Kazuma Kaya of Japan, Sam Mikulak of the United States and James Hall of Britain, when Kaya and Mikulak took the final's last two spots after their tied 8th place because they posted identical D- and E-scores while Hall ended up placing 10th, and just missed qualifying for the finals, even though he posted the same combined score.

==== Pommel horse ====
Rank	Gymnast	D Score	E Score	Pen.	Total	Qual.
1	(United Kingdom) Max Whitlock	6.700	8.266		14.966	Q
2	(China) Xiao Ruoteng	6.100	8.533		14.633	Q
3	(Kazakhstan) Nariman Kurbanov	6.200	8.266		14.466	Q
4	(France) Cyril Tommasone	6.100	8.141		14.241	Q
5	(United States) Sam Mikulak	6.000	8.133		14.133	Q
6	(Russia) Nikita Nagornyy	5.900	8.100		14.000	Q
7	(Russia) David Belyavskiy	6.200	7.800		14.000	Q
8	(Chinese Taipei) Lee Chih-kai	5.700	8.000		13.700	Q
9	(Switzerland) Oliver Hegi	5.300	8.200		13.500	R1
10	(South Korea) Park Min-soo	5.400	8.100		13.500	R2
11	(Brazil) Francisco Barretto Júnior	5.600	7.900		13.500	R3

==== Rings ====
Rank	Gymnast	D Score	E Score	Pen.	Total	Qual.
1	(Greece) Eleftherios Petrounias	6.300	8.966		15.266	Q
2	(Brazil) Arthur Zanetti	6.200	8.833		15.033	Q
3	(Armenia) Artur Tovmasyan	6.100	8.766		14.866	Q
4	(Ukraine) Igor Radivilov	6.300	8.433		14.733	Q
5	(Armenia) Vahagn Davtyan	6.100	8.566		14.666	Q
6	(Italy) Marco Lodadio	6.300	8.366		14.666	Q
7	(Azerbaijan) Nikita Simonov	6.000	8.633		14.633	Q
7	(Russia) Nikita Nagornyy	6.000	8.633		14.633	Q
9	(Belgium) Dennis Goossens	6.200	8.333		14.533	R1
9	(Turkey) İbrahim Çolak	6.200	8.333		14.533	R1
11	(Brazil) Caio Souza	6.000	8.433		14.433	R3

==== Vault ====
Position	Gymnast	D Score	E Score	Pen.	Score 1	D Score	E Score	Pen.	Score 2	Total	Qual.
Position	Gymnast	Vault 1				Vault 2				Total	Qual.
1	(North Korea) Ri Se-gwang	6.000	9.000	0.100	14.900	6.000	9.033		15.033	14.966	Q
2	(Russia) Artur Dalaloyan	5.600	9.166	0.100	14.666	5.600	9.266		14.866	14.766	Q
3	(Armenia) Artur Davtyan	5.600	9.100		14.700	5.600	9.200		14.800	14.750	Q
4	(Russia) Nikita Nagornyy	5.600	9.133		14.733	5.600	9.033		14.633	14.683	Q
5	(United Kingdom) Dominick Cunningham	5.400	9.066		14.466	5.600	9.166		14.766	14.616	Q
6	(Brazil) Caio Souza	5.600	9.033		14.633	5.600	8.933		14.533	14.583	Q
7	(Japan) Kenzō Shirai	5.600	9.133		14.733	5.200	9.200		14.400	14.566	Q
8	(Hong Kong) Shek Wai Hung	5.600	9.000		14.600	5.600	8.966	0.100	14.466	14.533	Q
9	(Philippines) Carlos Yulo	5.600	9.166	0.100	14.666	5.200	9.133		14.333	14.499	R1
10	(Ukraine) Oleg Verniaiev	5.600	8.766		14.366	5.600	9.033		14.633	14.499	R2
11	(Japan) Wataru Tanigawa	5.600	9.000		14.600	5.600	8.833	0.100	14.333	14.466	R3

==== Parallel bars ====
Rank	Gymnast	D Score	E Score	Pen.	Total	Qual.
1	(China) Zou Jingyuan	6.600	9.200		15.800	Q
2	(Ukraine) Oleg Verniaiev	6.700	8.758		15.458	Q
3	(China) Lin Chaopan	6.400	8.866		15.266	Q
4	(Colombia) Jossimar Calvo	6.500	8.600		15.100	Q
5	(Russia) Artur Dalaloyan	6.400	8.641		15.041	Q
6	(Russia) David Belyavskiy	6.400	8.633		15.033	Q
6	(United States) Sam Mikulak	6.400	8.633		15.033	Q
8	(China) Xiao Ruoteng	6.200	8.800		15.000	–
9	(Russia) Nikita Nagornyy	6.400	8.566		14.966	–
10	(Germany) Lukas Dauser	6.300	8.633		14.933	Q
11	(Turkey) Ferhat Arıcan	6.600	8.266		14.866	R1
12	(Japan) Yūsuke Tanaka	6.300	8.533		14.833	R2
13	(Japan) Wataru Tanigawa	6.200	8.600		14.800	R3
13	(Ukraine) Petro Pakhniuk	6.200	8.600		14.800	R3

==== Horizontal bar ====
Rank	Gymnast	D Score	E Score	Pen.	Total	Qual.
1	(Japan) Kōhei Uchimura	6.400	8.200		14.600	Q
2	(United States) Sam Mikulak	6.100	8.466		14.566	Q
3	(China) Xiao Ruoteng	6.100	8.333		14.433	Q
4	(Netherlands) Epke Zonderland	6.200	8.200		14.400	Q
5	(Croatia) Tin Srbić	6.000	8.300		14.300	Q
6	(China) Deng Shudi	6.100	8.200		14.300	Q
7	(Chinese Taipei) Tang Chia-hung	6.000	8.200		14.200	Q
8	(Russia) Artur Dalaloyan	5.700	8.466		14.166	Q
9	(Cuba) Manrique Larduet	6.300	7.866		14.166	R1
10	(Japan) Yūsuke Tanaka	6.000	8.133		14.133	R2
11	(Australia) Tyson Bull	5.900	8.166		14.066	R3

=== Women's results ===
==== Team ====
Rank	Team	Vault (gymnastics)	Uneven bars	Balance beam	Floor (gymnastics)	Total	Qual.
1	United States	45.166 (1)	43.465 (1)	42.732 (1)	43.066 (1)	174.429	Q
1	Simone Biles	15.966	14.866	14.800	15.333	174.429	Q
1	Kara Eaker			14.466		174.429	Q
1	Morgan Hurd	14.600	14.466	13.466	13.933	174.429	Q
1	Grace McCallum	14.600	14.100		13.800	174.429	Q
1	Riley McCusker	14.266	14.133	13.100	13.266	174.429	Q
2	Russia	42.332 (6)	42.556 (4)	39.766 (4)	40.833 (2)	165.497	Q
2	Lilia Akhaimova	14.566			13.600	165.497	Q
2	Irina Alexeeva	13.500	13.833	13.133	13.066	165.497	Q
2	Angelina Melnikova	14.266	14.300	12.866	14.033	165.497	Q
2	Aliya Mustafina		14.433	13.233	13.200	165.497	Q
2	Angelina Simakova	0.000	12.366	13.400		165.497	Q
3	China	41.999 (7)	43.099 (2)	41.099 (2)	38.999 (10)	165.196	Q
3	Chen Yile	13.433	14.300	12.900	12.866	165.196	Q
3	Liu Jinru	14.300			12.133	165.196	Q
3	Liu Tingting		14.333	13.733		165.196	Q
3	Luo Huan	13.466	14.466	13.266	12.933	165.196	Q
3	Zhang Jin	14.233	10.733	14.100	13.200	165.196	Q
4	Canada	42.933 (3)	40.499 (9)	40.832 (3)	39.633 (5)	163.897	Q
4	Ellie Black	14.033	14.000	13.733	13.233	163.897	Q
4	Sophie Marois	14.200			12.900	163.897	Q
4	Brooklyn Moors	13.333	12.666	13.133	13.500	163.897	Q
4	Shallon Olsen	14.700		12.833	12.733	163.897	Q
4	Ana Padurariu		13.833	13.966		163.897	Q
5	Brazil	43.532 (2)	40.832 (7)	37.932 (12)	40.233 (3)	162.529	Q
5	Rebeca Andrade	14.566	14.333	12.633		162.529	Q
5	Jade Barbosa	14.500	13.333	11.700	13.200	162.529	Q
5	Thaís Fidélis	13.533			13.133	162.529	Q
5	Lorrane Oliveira		13.166	12.066	13.033	162.529	Q
5	Flávia Saraiva	14.466	12.400	13.233	13.900	162.529	Q
6	Japan	42.399 (5)	41.016 (6)	39.699 (6)	39.066 (8)	162.180	Q
6	Hitomi Hatakeda	13.533	13.800	13.133	12.466	162.180	Q
6	Nagi Kajita	13.333	13.550	11.866	12.400	162.180	Q
6	Mai Murakami	14.433	13.666	13.433	14.100	162.180	Q
6	Aiko Sugihara					162.180	Q
6	Asuka Teramoto	14.433	13.400	13.133	12.500	162.180	Q
7	France	41.632 (8)	40.732 (8)	39.566 (7)	39.699 (4)	161.629	Q
7	Juliette Bossu		13.866			161.629	Q
7	Marine Boyer	13.666		13.666	13.133	161.629	Q
7	Lorette Charpy	13.433	13.000	13.066	12.666	161.629	Q
7	Mélanie de Jesus dos Santos	14.466	13.866	12.566	13.900	161.629	Q
7	Louise Vanhille	13.500	12.933	12.900	12.600	161.629	Q
8	Germany	41.166 (12)	42.690 (3)	39.216 (8)	37.999 (14)	161.071	Q
8	Kim Bui	13.500	14.066		13.133	161.071	Q
8	Leah Griesser		13.400	13.033	11.733	161.071	Q
8	Sophie Scheder	13.433	14.058	13.050		161.071	Q
8	Elisabeth Seitz	13.666	14.566	11.700	12.866	161.071	Q
8	Sarah Voss	14.000		13.133	12.000	161.071	Q
9	Great Britain	42.566 (4)	41.666 (5)	37.733 (14)	38.999 (10)	160.964	R1
9	Becky Downie		14.400			160.964	R1
9	Ellie Downie	14.366	13.466	12.500	13.200	160.964	R1
9	Georgia-Mae Fenton	13.400	13.200	12.900	12.433	160.964	R1
9	Alice Kinsella	14.300		12.300	12.733	160.964	R1
9	Kelly Simm	13.900	13.800	12.333	13.066	160.964	R1
10	Netherlands	40.432 (18)	39.766 (11)	39.765 (5)	39.066 (8)	159.029	R2
10	Kirsten Polderman	13.366			11.766	159.029	R2
10	Vera van Pol	13.766	13.000	11.066	12.500	159.029	R2
10	Naomi Visser	13.300	13.433	12.966	13.133	159.029	R2
10	Tisha Volleman	0.000	12.833	12.766	13.433	159.029	R2
10	Sanne Wevers		13.333	14.033		159.029	R2

==== Individual all-around ====
Rank	Gymnast	Vault (gymnastics)	Uneven bars	Balance beam	Floor (gymnastics)	Total	Qual.
1	(United States) Simone Biles	15.966	14.866	14.800	15.333	60.965	Q
2	(United States) Morgan Hurd	14.600	14.466	13.466	13.933	56.465	Q
3	(Japan) Mai Murakami	14.433	13.666	13.433	14.100	55.632	Q
4	(Belgium) Nina Derwael	13.466	15.066	13.766	13.266	55.564	Q
5	(Russia) Angelina Melnikova	14.266	14.300	12.866	14.033	55.465	Q
6	(Canada) Ellie Black	14.033	14.000	13.733	13.233	54.999	Q
7	(France) Mélanie de Jesus dos Santos	14.466	13.866	12.566	13.900	54.798	Q
8	(United States) Riley McCusker	14.266	14.133	13.100	13.266	54.765	–
9	(China) Luo Huan	13.466	14.466	13.266	12.933	54.131	Q
10	(Brazil) Flávia Saraiva	14.466	12.400	13.233	13.900	53.999	Q
11	(United Kingdom) Ellie Downie	14.366	13.466	12.500	13.200	53.532	Q
12	(Russia) Irina Alexeeva	13.500	13.833	13.133	13.066	53.532	Q
13	(China) Chen Yile	13.433	14.300	12.900	12.866	53.499	Q
14	(Japan) Asuka Teramoto	14.433	13.400	13.133	12.500	53.466	Q
15	(United Kingdom) Kelly Simm	13.900	13.800	12.333	13.066	53.099	Q
16	(Japan) Hitomi Hatakeda	13.533	13.800	13.133	12.466	52.932	–
17	(Netherlands) Naomi Visser	13.300	13.433	12.966	13.133	52.832	Q
18	(Germany) Elisabeth Seitz	13.666	14.566	11.700	12.866	52.798	Q
19	(Romania) Denisa Golgotă	14.266	12.366	12.733	13.400	52.765	Q
20	(Brazil) Jade Barbosa	14.500	13.333	11.700	13.200	52.733	Q
21	(Canada) Brooklyn Moors	13.333	12.666	13.133	13.500	52.632	Q
22	(China) Zhang Jin	14.233	10.733	14.100	13.200	52.266	–
23	(Italy) Lara Mori	13.366	12.633	12.800	13.400	52.199	Q
24	(Hungary) Zsófia Kovács	13.633	12.833	13.066	12.633	52.165	Q
25	(France) Lorette Charpy	13.433	13.000	13.066	12.666	52.165	Q
26	(Spain) Ana Pérez	13.500	12.966	12.866	12.800	52.132	Q
27	(Belgium) Axelle Klinckaert	13.700	12.033	13.175	13.166	52.074	Q
28	(South Korea) Yeo Seo-jeong	14.566	11.908	12.600	12.966	52.040	R1
29	(Italy) Sara Ricciardi	13.733	12.600	12.833	12.833	51.999	R2
30	(United Kingdom) Georgia-Mae Fenton	13.400	13.200	12.900	12.433	51.933	–
31	(France) Louise Vanhille	13.500	12.933	12.900	12.600	51.933	–
32	(Mexico) Frida Esparza	13.433	13.433	12.233	12.300	51.399	R3
33	(Mexico) Alexa Moreno	14.633	12.133	11.966	12.600	51.332	R4

==== Vault ====
Position	Gymnast	D Score	E Score	Pen.	Score 1	D Score	E Score	Pen.	Score 2	Total	Qual.
Position	Gymnast	Vault 1				Vault 2				Total	Qual.
1	(United States) Simone Biles	6.400	9.566		15.966	5.800	9.566		15.366	15.666	Q
2	(Canada) Shallon Olsen	6.000	8.700		14.700	5.400	9.000		14.400	14.550	Q
3	(South Korea) Yeo Seo-jeong	5.800	8.766		14.566	5.400	9.000		14.400	14.483	Q
4	(Mexico) Alexa Moreno	5.800	8.833		14.633	5.600	8.700		14.300	14.466	Q
5	(Uzbekistan) Oksana Chusovitina	5.400	8.900		14.300	5.200	9.000	0.100	14.100	14.200	Q
6	(North Korea) Pyon Rye-yong	5.400	8.600		14.000	5.800	8.466		14.266	14.133	Q
7	(Canada) Ellie Black	5.400	8.633		14.033	5.200	9.016		14.216	14.124	Q
8	(China) Liu Jinru	5.600	8.700		14.300	5.800	8.433	0.300	13.933	14.116	Q
9	(Russia) Lilia Akhaimova	5.800	8.766		14.566	5.600	8.333	0.300	13.633	14.099	R1
10	(United States) Grace McCallum	5.400	9.200		14.600	4.600	8.933		13.533	14.066	R2
11	(Russia) Angelina Melnikova	5.400	8.866		14.266	5.200	8.658	0.100	13.758	14.012	R3

==== Uneven bars ====
Rank	Gymnast	D Score	E Score	Pen.	Total	Qual.
1	(Belgium) Nina Derwael	6.500	8.566		15.066	Q
2	(United States) Simone Biles	6.200	8.666		14.866	Q
3	(Germany) Elisabeth Seitz	6.200	8.366		14.566	Q
4	(China) Luo Huan	6.000	8.466		14.466	Q
5	(United States) Morgan Hurd	6.100	8.366		14.466	Q
6	(Russia) Aliya Mustafina	5.800	8.633		14.433	Q
7	(Sweden) Jonna Adlerteg	6.200	8.233		14.433	Q
8	(United Kingdom) Becky Downie	6.200	8.200		14.400	Q
9	(China) Liu Tingting	6.000	8.333		14.333	R1
10	(Brazil) Rebeca Andrade	6.100	8.233		14.333	R2
11	(China) Chen Yile	5.900	8.400		14.300	–
12	(Russia) Angelina Melnikova	6.300	8.000		14.300	R3

==== Balance beam ====
Rank	Gymnast	D Score	E Score	Pen.	Total	Qual.
1	(United States) Simone Biles	6.400	8.400		14.800	Q
2	(United States) Kara Eaker	6.400	8.066		14.466	Q
3	(China) Zhang Jin	6.000	8.100		14.100	Q
4	(Netherlands) Sanne Wevers	5.400	8.633		14.033	Q
5	(Canada) Ana Padurariu	6.100	7.866		13.966	Q
6	(Belgium) Nina Derwael	5.200	8.566		13.766	Q
7	(Canada) Ellie Black	5.500	8.233		13.733	Q
8	(China) Liu Tingting	6.000	7.833	0.100	13.733	Q
9	(France) Marine Boyer	6.200	7.400		13.600	R1
10	(Chinese Taipei) Ting Hua-tien	5.500	7.966		13.466	R2
11	(United States) Morgan Hurd	5.600	7.866		13.466	–
12	(Japan) Mai Murakami	5.400	8.033		13.433	R3

==== Floor ====
Rank	Gymnast	D Score	E Score	Pen.	Total	Qual.
1	(United States) Simone Biles	6.700	8.633		15.333	Q
2	(Japan) Mai Murakami	5.800	8.300		14.100	Q
3	(Russia) Angelina Melnikova	5.900	8.133		14.033	Q
4	(United States) Morgan Hurd	5.500	8.433		13.933	Q
5	(Brazil) Flávia Saraiva	5.500	8.400		13.900	Q
6	(France) Mélanie de Jesus dos Santos	5.600	8.300		13.900	Q
7	(United States) Grace McCallum	5.500	8.300		13.800	–
8	(Russia) Lilia Akhaimova	5.700	7.900		13.600	Q
9	(Canada) Brooklyn Moors	5.400	8.100		13.500	Q
10	(Netherlands) Tisha Volleman	5.400	8.133	0.100	13.433	R1
11	(Romania) Denisa Golgotă	5.400	8.000		13.400	R2
12	(Italy) Lara Mori	5.600	7.900	0.100	13.400	R3
