= Madison Copiak =

Canadian artistic gymnast

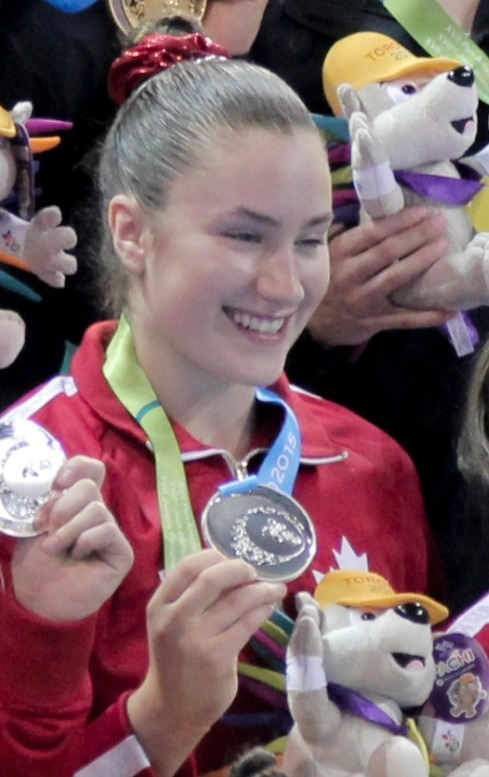
- Copiak at the 2015 Pan American Games

Personal information
- Nickname: Maddie
- Born: September 17, 1998 (age 27) Calgary, Alberta
- Height: 170 cm (5 ft 7 in)

Gymnastics career
- Discipline: Women's artistic gymnastics
- Country represented: Canada
- College team: Washington Huskies
Medal record
Women's artistic gymnastics
Representing Canada
Pan American Games
Silver medal – second place	2015 Toronto	Team
Pacific Rim Championships
Silver medal – second place	2016 Everett	Team

Madison Copiak (born September 17, 1998) is a Canadian former artistic gymnast. She won a silver medal in the team events at the 2015 Pan American Games and the 2016 Pacific Rim Championships. She was an alternate for Canada's teams at the 2015 World Championships and the 2016 Summer Olympics.

== Gymnastics career ==
Copiak began gymnastics when she was three years old.

Copiak placed 12th in the all-around at the 2014 International Gymnix. She then competed with the team that placed fourth at the 2014 Pan American Championships. At the 2014 Pan American Sports Festival, she won a silver medal on the balance beam, behind Ayelén Tarabini. She then won a bronze medal on the uneven bars and a silver medal on the balance beam at the 2014 Toyota International.

Copiak finished fourth in the all-around at both the 2015 Elite Canada and the 2015 Canadian Championships. She also placed fourth in the all-around at the 2015 International Gymnix and won a bronze medal on the balance beam. She was then selected to represent Canada at the 2015 Pan American Games alongside Ellie Black, Maegan Chant, Isabela Onyshko, and Victoria-Kayen Woo. She helped the team win a silver medal behind the United States. Individually, she qualified for the uneven bars final and finished seventh. She was the alternate for the 2015 World Championships team.

Copiak competed at the 2016 Glasgow World Cup and finished sixth in the all-around. She then helped the Canadian team win the silver medal at the 2016 Pacific Rim Championships, behind the United States. She was selected to be an alternate for the 2016 Olympic team.

Copiak began competing for the Washington Huskies during the 2017 season. She helped Washington finish a second-best-ever eighth place at the 2017 NCAA Championships, where she became an All-American on the uneven bars. She also competed at the 2018 NCAA Championships, where Washington placed 11th. She scored a 9.975 on the uneven bars during a 2019 meet at UC Davis, which was the highest uneven bars score for a Washington gymnast since 2004. The 2020 season was cut short due to the COVID-19 pandemic, which prompted the NCAA and Pac-12 to cancel all regular season and championship events, effectively ending Copiak's gymnastics career. Still, Copiak was named to the All-Pac-12 Uneven Bars First Team, and she also received All-America honors on the uneven bars.
