= 2017 Pan American Individual Event Artistic Gymnastics Championships =

Pan American Artistic Gymnastics Championships
- Location: Lima, Peru
- Date: August 10–12, 2017

The 2017 Pan American Individual Event Artistic Gymnastics Championships was held in Lima, Peru, August 10–12, 2017. The competition was organized by the Peruvian Gymnastics Federation and approved by the International Gymnastics Federation.

== Medal summary ==
=== Senior medalists ===
Event	Gold	Silver	Bronze
Men
Floor exercise	Jorge Vega (GUA)	Andrés Martínez (COL)	Tomás González (CHI)
Pommel horse	Zachary Clay (CAN)	Caio Souza (BRA)	Erick Vargas (COL)
Rings	Federico Molinari (ARG)	Caio Souza (BRA)	Kristopher Bohórquez (COL)
Vault	Audrys Nin Reyes (DOM)	Joshua Valle (MEX)	Jorge Vega (GUA)
Parallel bars	Caio Souza (BRA)	Osvaldo Martinez (ARG)	Audrys Nin Reyes (DOM)
Horizontal bar	Audrys Nin Reyes (DOM)	Kevin Cerda (MEX)	Caio Souza (BRA)
Women
Vault	Ahtziri Sandoval (MEX)	Brooklyn Moors (CAN)	Dayana Ardila (COL)
Uneven bars	Jade Chrobok (CAN)	Ahtziri Sandoval (MEX)	Brooklyn Moors (CAN)
Balance beam	Sophie Marois (CAN)	Agustina Pisos (ARG)	Carolyne Pedro (BRA)
Floor exercise	Brooklyn Moors (CAN)	Laurie Denommée (CAN)	Miriana Almeida (MEX)

== Medal table ==
Rank	Nation	Gold	Silver	Bronze	Total
1	Canada (CAN)	4	2	1	7
2	Dominican Republic (DOM)	2	0	1	3
3	Mexico (MEX)	1	3	1	5
4	Brazil (BRA)	1	2	2	5
5	Argentina (ARG)	1	2	0	3
6	Guatemala (GUA)	1	0	1	2
7	Colombia (COL)	0	1	3	4
8	Chile (CHI)	0	0	1	1
Totals (8 entries)		10	10	10	30
