= Tan Sze En =

Singaporean artistic gymnast

- Born: 19 October 2000 (age 26) Singapore
- Height: 5 ft 7 in (1.70 m)

Gymnastics career
- Discipline: Women's artistic gymnastics
- Country represented: Singapore
- College team: Stanford Cardinal (2021–2022)
- Club: Legacy Elite
- Head coach: Wang Xi

Tan Sze En (born 19 October 2000) is a Singaporean artistic gymnast who represented her country at the 2020 Olympic Games and the 2019 World Championships. She is the 2016 and 2018 Singapore national champion and was named Senior International Athlete of the Year at the 2020 Singapore Gymnastics Awards. She was a member of the Stanford Cardinal women's gymnastics team from 2021 to 2022.

== Personal life ==
Tan was born on 19 October 2000 in Singapore. She took up gymnastics at age 6.

Following the 2016 season, Tan moved to the United States with her family so she could train at Legacy Elite Gymnastics in Illinois. She began attending Stanford University in 2020.

== Career ==
Tan first came into prominence in 2016, when she swept Singapore’s national championships in her first meet as a senior. Later that year, she competed at the Pacific Rim Championships, placing 11th all-around. Tan also competed at the Anadia World Challenge Cup but did not make the finals.

Tan was set to compete at the 2017 Southeast Asian Games but had to withdraw after fracturing her ankle in training. She missed the rest of the 2017 season.

Tan started her 2018 season at the Buckeye National Qualifier and the WOGA Classic. In March, Tan once again became the Singapore national all-around champion. She went on to compete at the 2018 Asian Games, but was limited to beam and floor and did not make the event finals. She underwent shoulder surgery following the Games.

In 2019, Tan competed at the Singapore Open, winning the gold medal on floor. She represented Singapore at the 2019 Asian Championships and the Paris Challenge Cup, but did not make the finals. Tan made her World Championship debut at the 2019 World Championships in Stuttgart, placing 94th all-around during qualifications. Although she did not qualify to the final, she qualified as an individual for the 2020 Summer Olympics in Tokyo. Tan is the second Singaporean female gymnast to qualify to an Olympic Games, after Lim Heem Wei became the first in 2012.

At the Tokyo Olympics, Tan was limited to the balance beam and the floor exercise due to a wrist injury. She finished 84th on beam and 75th on floor, and did not advance to the finals.

== Competitive history ==
Year	Event	Team	AA	VT	UB	BB	FX
2016	Singapore Championships		1st place, gold medalist(s)	1st place, gold medalist(s)	1st place, gold medalist(s)	1st place, gold medalist(s)	1st place, gold medalist(s)
2016	Pacific Rim Championships		11				
2018	Buckeye National Qualifier		2nd place, silver medalist(s)	1st place, gold medalist(s)	2nd place, silver medalist(s)	2nd place, silver medalist(s)	3rd place, bronze medalist(s)
2018	WOGA Classic		11				
2018	Singapore Championships		1st place, gold medalist(s)				
2018	Asian Games					29	44
2019	Singapore Open						1st place, gold medalist(s)
2019	World Championships		94				
2021
2021	Olympic Games					84	75
