= Gymnastics at the 2019 Pan American Games – Women's floor =

Women's floor exercise at the 2019 Pan American Games
- Venue: Polideportivo Villa el Salvador
- Dates: July 31
- Competitors: 8 from 4 nations
- Winning score: 13.900

Medalists
Gold medal	Brooklyn Moors	Canada
Silver medal	Kara Eaker	United States
Bronze medal	Flávia Saraiva	Brazil

The women's floor exercise gymnastic event at the 2019 Pan American Games was held on July 31 at the Polideportivo Villa el Salvador.

== Schedule ==
All times are Eastern Standard Time (UTC-3).

Date	Time	Round
July 31, 2019	14:00	Final

== Results ==
=== Qualification ===
Women's floor exercise qualification results
Rank	Gymnast	D Score	E Score	Pen.	Total	Qual.
1	Riley McCusker (USA)	5.400	8.650		14.050	Q
2	Kara Eaker (USA)	5.400	8.450		13.850	Q
3	Flávia Saraiva (BRA)	5.300	8.500		13.800	Q
4	Aleah Finnegan (USA)	5.500	8.250		13.750	–
5	Ellie Black (CAN)	5.400	8.150		13.550	Q
6	Brooklyn Moors (CAN)	5.100	8.400		13.500	Q
7	Thais Fidelis (BRA)	5.100	8.300	0.100	13.300	Q
8	Morgan Hurd (USA)	5.200	8.100		13.300	–
9	Martina Dominici (ARG)	4.900	8.300		13.200	Q
10	Abigail Magistrati (ARG)	4.900	8.200		13.100	Q
11	Victoria-Kayen Woo (CAN)	5.000	8.100		13.100	–
12	Ana Palacios (GUA)	5.000	7.950		12.950	R1
13	Ariana Orrego (PER)	4.700	8.150		12.850	R2
14	Marcia Vidiaux (CUB)	5.100	7.800	0.100	12.800	R3

=== Final ===
Women's floor exercise final results
Rank	Gymnast	D Score	E Score	Pen.	Total
1st place, gold medalist(s)	Brooklyn Moors (CAN)	5.4	8.600	0.1	13.900
2nd place, silver medalist(s)	Kara Eaker (USA)	5.4	8.400		13.800
3rd place, bronze medalist(s)	Flávia Saraiva (BRA)	5.2	8.566		13.766
4	Ellie Black (CAN)	5.4	8.033		13.433
5	Riley McCusker (USA)	5.3	8.200	0.2	13.300
6	Martina Dominici (ARG)	5.1	8.133		13.233
7	Thais Fidelis (BRA)	5.2	7.866	0.1	12.966
8	Abigail Magistrati (ARG)	4.7	8.166		12.866
