= Nagi Kajita =

Japanese artistic gymnast

- Born: 15 October 2000 (age 25) Yamanashi, Japan

Gymnastics career
- Discipline: Women's artistic gymnastics
- Country represented: Japan
- Club: Chukyo University
- Head coaches: Hikaru Tanaka, Yasutaka Ito, Shuji Sakamoto
Medal record
Pacific Rim Championships
Bronze medal – third place	2016 Everett	All-around
Bronze medal – third place	2016 Everett	Uneven bars

Nagi Kajita (梶田渚, Kajita Nagi; born 15 October 2000) is a Japanese artistic gymnast. She competed at the 2018 and 2019 World Championships. She is the 2016 Pacific Rim bronze medalist in the all-around and on the uneven bars.

== Gymnastics career ==
=== Junior ===
Kajita made her international debut at the 2014 WOGA Classic and placed eighth in the all-around with a score of 51.850. She placed sixth on the floor exercise at the 2014 All-Japan Event Championships.

In 2015, Kajita competed again at the WOGA Classic where she won the silver medal in the all-around behind American Elena Arenas. She placed seventh on the uneven bars at the Japanese Event Championships. At the Junior Japan International in Yokohama, she finished fourth on the uneven bars with a score of 13.666.

=== Senior ===
==== 2016-2017 ====
Kajita made her senior international debut at the 2016 WOGA Classic where she won the all-around gold medal with a total score of 55.650. At the International Gymnix in Montreal, she tied for the bronze medal on the balance beam with Eythora Thorsdottir. She placed fourteenth in the all-around at the All-Japan Championships. She competed at the Pacific Rim Gymnastics Championships with Kiko Kuwajima, Mana Oguchi, Soyoka Hanawa, and Natsumi Hanashima, and they placed fourth behind the United States, Canada, and Australia. Individually, Kajita won the bronze medal in the all-around behind Simone Biles and Aly Raisman. In the event finals, she placed eighth on the uneven bars and fourth on the floor exercise, and she won the bronze medal on the balance beam behind Ragan Smith and Raisman. At the NHK Trophy, she placed ninth in the all-around.

Kajita competed at the 2017 WOGA Classic and tied for third in the all-around with Natsumi Hanashima. She also placed third in the all-around at the All-Japan Championships behind Mai Murakami and Aiko Sugihara.

==== 2018-2019 ====
At the 2018 Stuttgart World Cup, Kajita placed seventh in the all-around. Then at the Doha World Cup, she placed seventh on the uneven bars, sixth on the balance beam, and eighth on the floor exercise. She won the bronze medal on the uneven bars and the floor exercise at the All-Japan Event Championships. She was selected to compete at the 2018 World Championships alongside Hitomi Hatakeda, Mai Murakami, Aiko Sugihara, and Asuka Teramoto. They finished sixth in the qualification round and qualified for the team final where they once again finished sixth. She then competed at the Cottbus World Cup, but she did not qualify for any event finals.

At the 2019 WOGA Classic, Kajita tied for the silver medal in the all-around with Sloane Blakely. She then competed at the Birmingham World Cup where she finished eighth in the all-around. She finished seventh in the all-around at the 2019 NHK Trophy and was then named to the 2019 World Championships team. She tied for the all-around gold medal with Yuki Uchiyama at the All-Japan Student Championships. At the 2019 World Championships, the Japanese team of Kajita, Hitomi Hatakeda, Akari Matsumura, Aiko Sugihara, and Asuka Teramoto placed eleventh and qualified for the 2020 Olympic Games.
