= Sophie Marois =

Canadian artistic gymnast

- Born: March 30, 2001 (age 25) Montreal, Quebec, Canada

Gymnastics career
- Discipline: Women's artistic gymnastics
- Country represented: Canada; (2017–2022)
- Club: Méga-Gym
- Head coach: Frank Kistler
Medal record
Women's artistic gymnastics
Representing Canada
Pan American Championships
Gold medal – first place	2017 Lima	Balance beam
Pacific Rim Championships
Silver medal – second place	2018 Medellín	Team
Bronze medal – third place	2018 Medellín	Vault
FIG World Cup
Event / 1st / 2nd / 3rd; World Challenge Cup / 0 / 0 / 2

Sophie Marois (born 30 March 2001) is a Canadian former artistic gymnast who competed at the 2018 World Championships. She is the 2017 Pan American champion on the balance beam and the 2018 Pacific Rim Championships vault bronze medalist.

== Early life ==
Marois was born in Montreal, Quebec, in 2001.

== Career ==
Marois began competing for the senior Canadian national artistic gymnastics team in 2017. That same year, she finished in first place on the balance beam at the Pan American Championships.

At the 2018 Pacific Rim Championships, Marois won a silver medal with the Canadian team. Then in the vault final, she won the bronze medal behind Jordan Chiles and Grace McCallum. She was part of the Canadian team at the 2018 World Championships. Marois had been named to the team as a reserve, but was called in to compete after Laurie Dénommée injured her ankle days before the competition. The team finished the competition in fourth place, which at the time was the best finish for the Canadian women's artistic gymnastics program.

At the 2019 Guimaraes World Challenge Cup, Marois won bronze medals on both the vault and balance beam. She also competed in the uneven bars final but finished eighth after falling. She also won a vault bronze medal at the 2019 Elite Gym Massilia. She won a bronze medal with the Canadian team at the 2020 International Gymnix, and individually, she won the vault silver medal behind MyKayla Skinner. She qualified for the vault final at the 2020 Baku World Cup, but the apparatus finals were canceled due to the outbreak of the COVID-19 pandemic in Azerbaijan.

Marois won the vault bronze medal at the 2021 Canadian Championships and placed tenth in the all-around. The final competition of her career was the 2022 Koper World Challenge Cup, where she finished sixth in the balance beam final.
