= Parque Olímpico de la Juventud =

Sports facility

The Parque Olímpico de la Juventud, former Parque Polideportivo Roca, is a large park with sports facilities in southern Buenos Aires, Argentina. Located in Villa Soldati, by the Riachuelo, it was opened in 1979 by Osvaldo Cacciatore, de facto Mayor of Buenos Aires during the National Reorganization Process military dictatorship.

== History ==
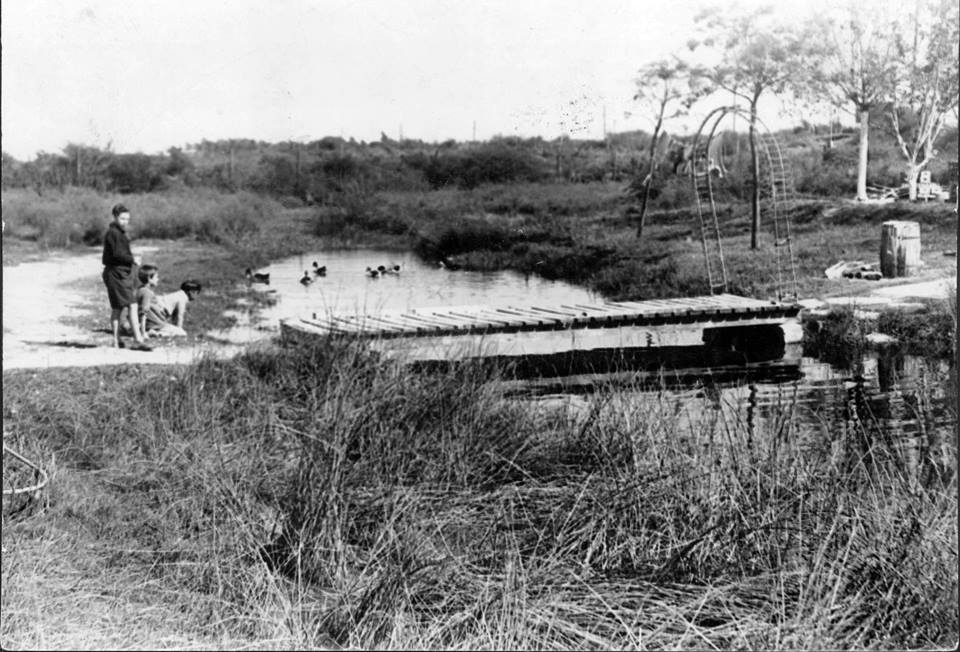
The Cildañez Creek, that flows into the Riachuelo and divides Roca Park, in 1962.

In 1840 Juan Manuel de Rosas, Governor of Buenos Aires Province, ceded this land to a man surnamed Lucero, who planted eucalyptus, pine trees, pear trees and quince trees, and installed a water mill. The property was known then as the Quinta del Molina, Mill's Country House. After Mr. Lucero died the property was abandoned and occupied by poor families. By 1930 this area became a dumpsite.

During the 1940s three artificial lakes were constructed on this area to compensate floods and overflows of the Riachuelo: the Lugano Lake, located within the Roca Park; the Regatas Lake, located within the Autódromo Juan y Oscar Gálvez; and the Soldati Lake, located next to Parque Indoamericano.

On November 15, 1978, during the administration of the appointed Mayor Osvaldo Cacciatore, the "Soldati dumpsite" was closed, and the following year the Government opened the Parque Polideportivo Julio A. Roca, named after Julio Argentino Roca, two times President of Argentina.

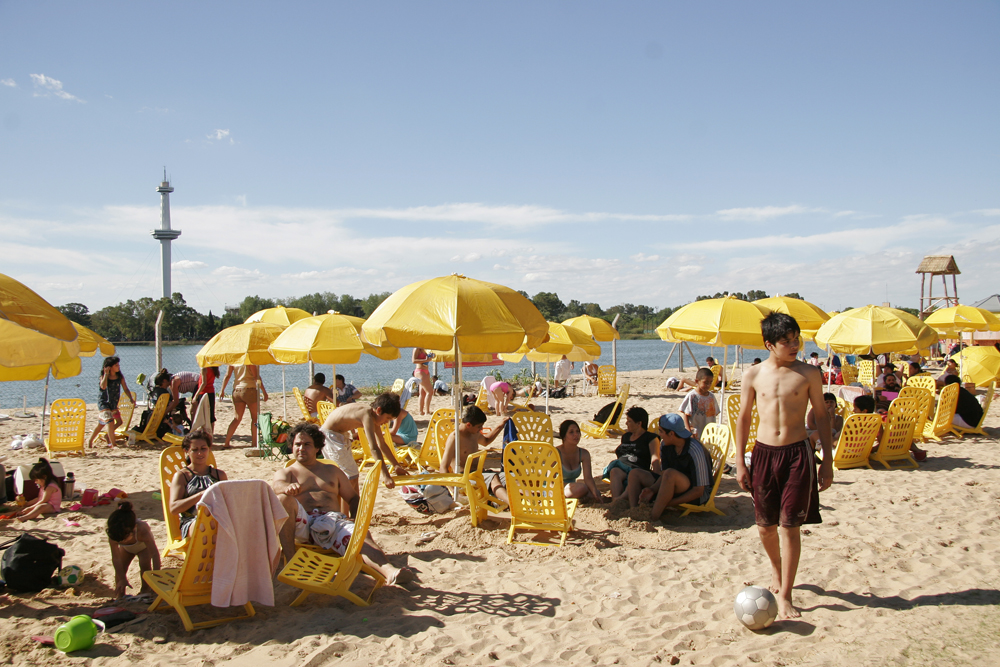
Summer artificial beach by Lugano Lake. The 200 meters high Space Needle can be seen on the background.

In September 2006, Jorge Telerman, Chief of Government of Buenos Aires, inaugurated the Roca Park Tennis Stadium, that hosted the 2006 Davis Cup World Group semifinal between Argentina and Australia only three days after the official opening. That same year Roca Park hosted the archery and tennis events for the 2006 South American Games.

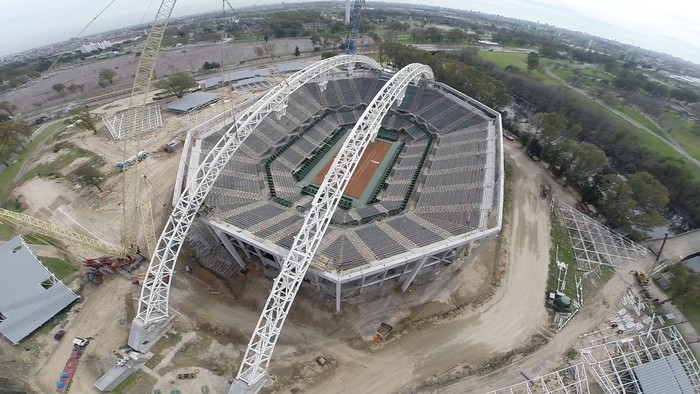
The Roca Park Tennis Stadium will be fully covered for the 2018 Summer Youth Olympics.

It was confirmed in 2014 that Roca Park will be one of the main venues for the 2018 Summer Youth Olympics, hosting the athletics, tennis, archery, swimming and diving events. Parque Roca will be part of the Olympic Park, that will also include the Predio Ferial Olímpico, and will be the site of the Main Media Center (MMC) and the Youth Olympic Village (YOV), from where 65 percent of the athletes will be able to walk to their competition venues.

The area surrounding the Lugano Lake is a natural reserve. More than 20 different butterfly species and 118 bird species have been found in this area, and also other animals such as side-necked turtles, tegus, coypus and guinea pigs.

== Overview ==
This park is the largest sport complex in Buenos Aires, with an area of 200 hectares (494 acres). It is surrounded by the Cámpora Highway (es), and the avenues Coronel Roca (es), 27 de Febrero (es) and Avenida Escalada, and is divided by the Cildañez Creek that flows into the Riachuelo. The artificial Lugano Lake is also located within the limits of the park. The sports complex includes:

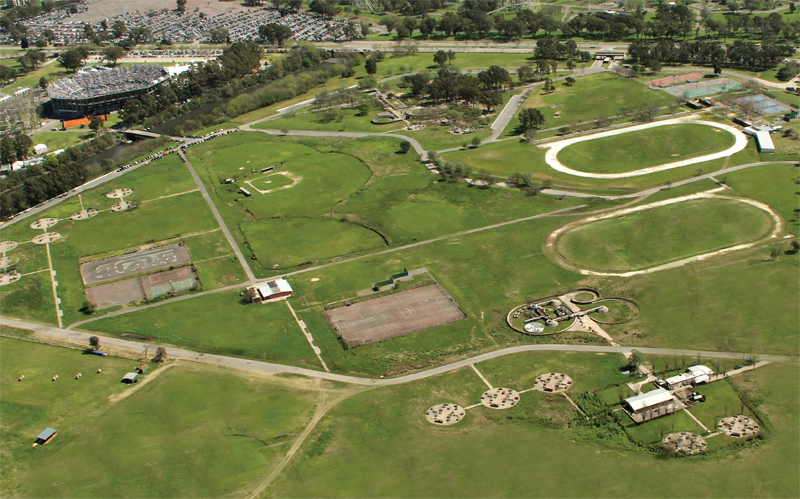
Part of Roca Park.

- Roca Park Stadium
- 15 football fields
- 2 outdoor basketball courts
- 2 baseball fields
- 4 outdoor volleyball courts
- 11 tennis courts
- 3 swimming pools
- A BMX circuit
- A track and field stadium
- An archery venue
- A velodrome

For the 2018 Summer Youth Olympics a new aquatics complex was built.

Since 2008 the Government of the City of Buenos Aires has installed an artificial beach every summer at the park and organizes recreational activities during the summer season.

The park can be reached by Premetro tram at Cecilia Grierson station, or by the southern Metrobus line.

== Olympic Park ==
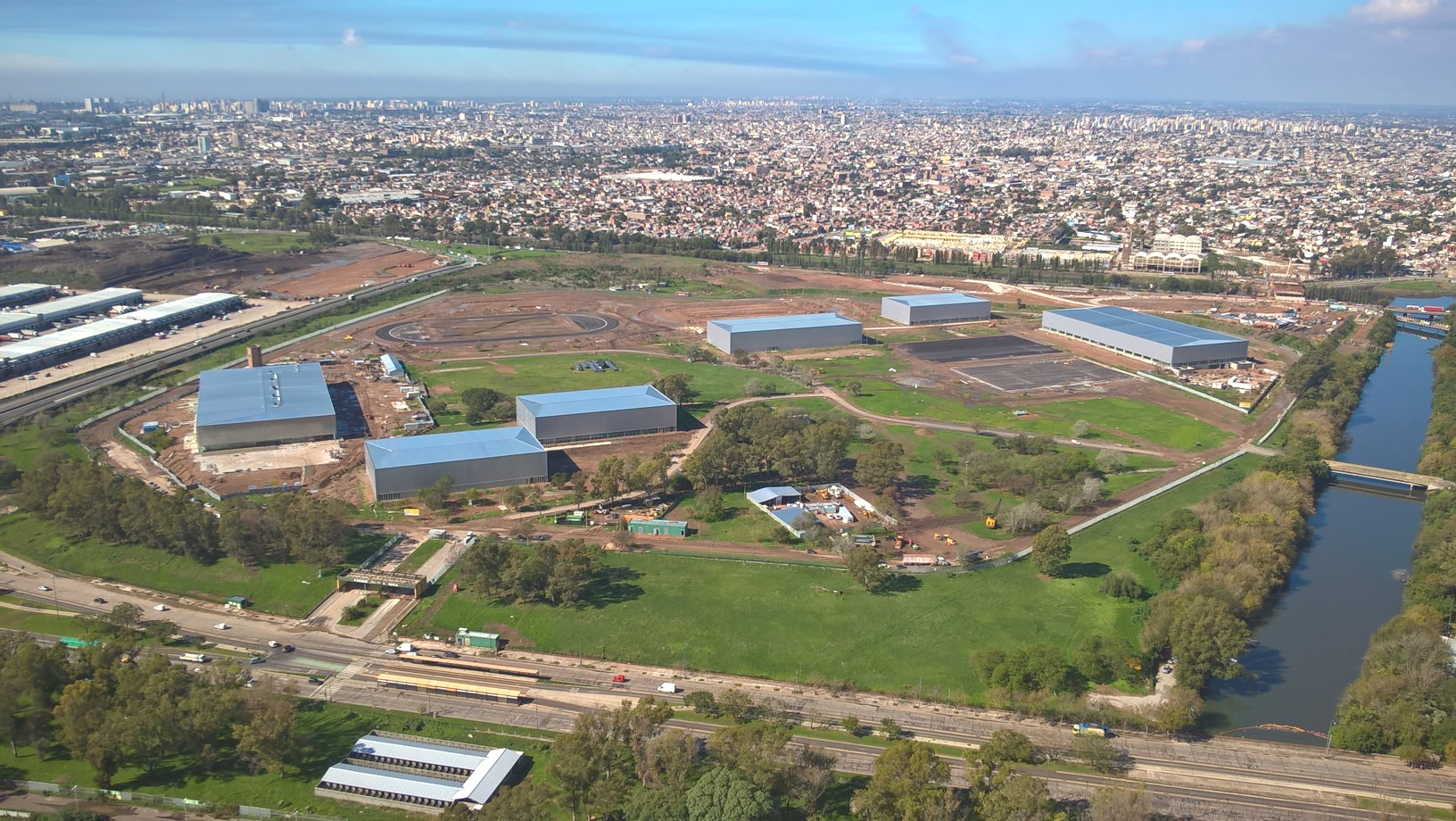
Olympic Park.

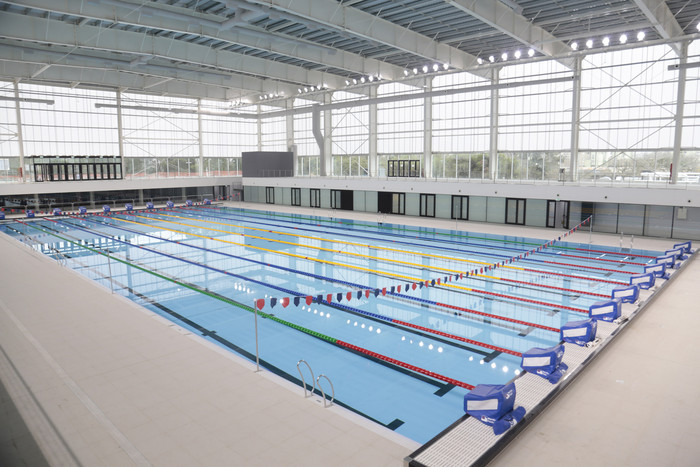
New swimming complex.

The park was fully renovated before the 2018 Summer Youth Olympics in order to be used as main Olympic Park. Six pavilions were built: Asia Pavilion (judo and wrestling), Africa Pavilion (fencing and modern pentathlon), Europe Pavilion (karate and weightlifting), Oceania Pavilion (boxing and taekwondo), America Pavilion (gymnastics) and natatorium. The complex also includes hockey and athletics field.
