= Avenida Escalada =

Avenue in Buenos Aires

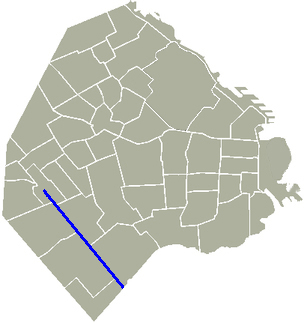
Location of Avenida Escalada in Buenos Aires.

Avenida Escalada is one of the longest avenues in Buenos Aires, crossing the southern barrios of Villa Luro, Mataderos, Parque Avellaneda, Villa Lugano, Villa Soldati and Villa Riachuelo. It runs northwest–southeast from Avenida Rivadavia to Riachuelo River.

It crosses the Parque Polideportivo Roca, Golf Club José Jurado, Buenos Aires Automotive Racetrack, City Park, Parque Indoamericano and the Buenos Aires Regional Faculty of the National Technological University.

The Escalada (Buenos Aires Premetro) station of the Premetro is located on this avenue, and the Villa Luro Station of the Sarmiento Line is a few meters away from the northern extreme of the avenue.
