= Demonstration sport =

Promotional sporting event

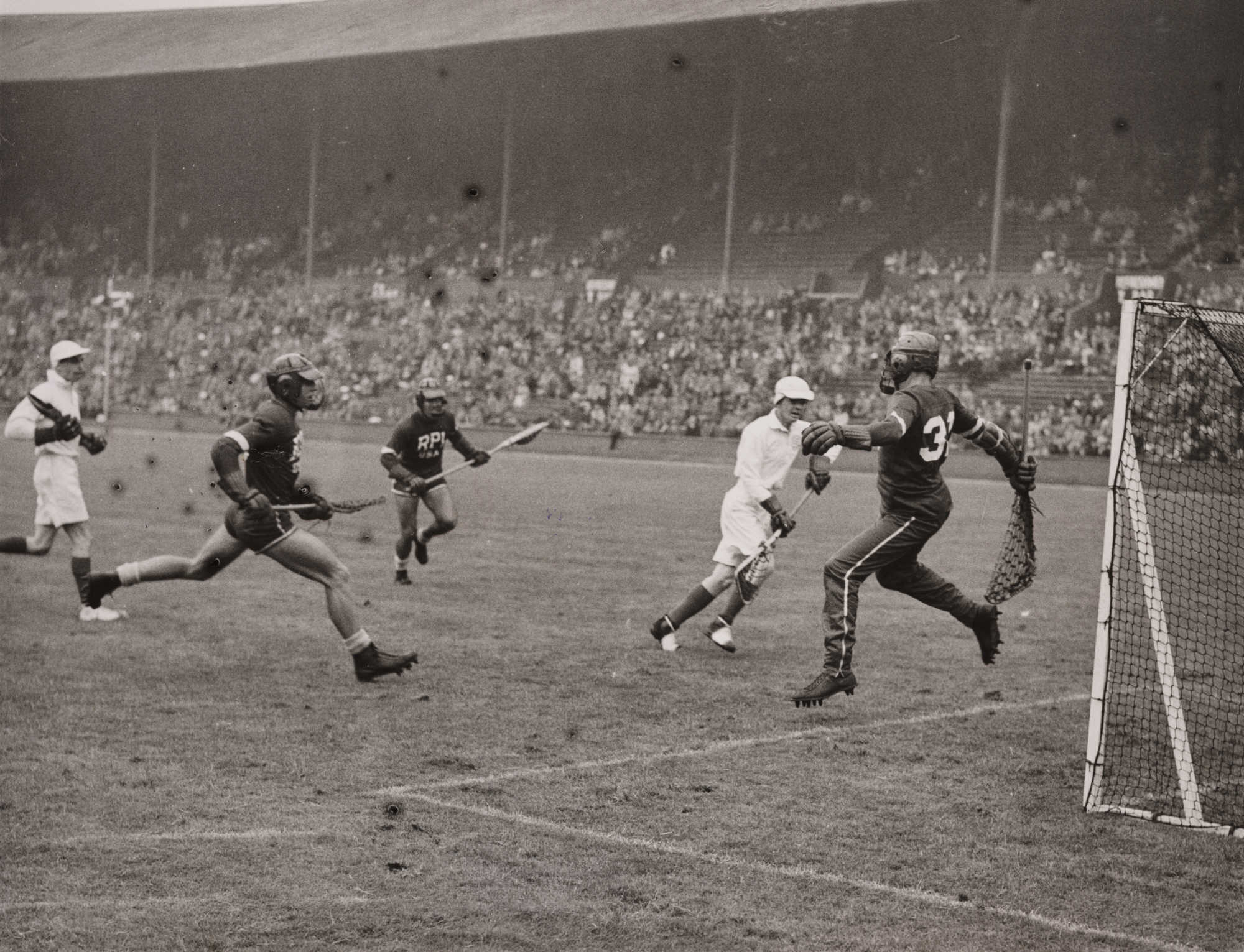
Demonstration game of Lacrosse at the Olympics, London, 1948.

A demonstration sport, or exhibition sport, is a sport which is played to promote it, rather than as part of standard medal competition. This occurs commonly during the Olympic Games but may also occur at other sporting events.

Demonstration sports were officially introduced in the 1924 Summer Olympics, though some scholars consider unofficial sports prior to 1924 to also be demonstrations. Most organizing committees then decided to include at least one demonstration sport at each edition of the Games, usually some typical or popular sport in the host country, like baseball at the 1984 Los Angeles Olympic Games and taekwondo at the 1988 Seoul Olympic Games. From 1924 to 1992, only two Summer Olympics Games did not have demonstration sports on their program. Some demonstration sports eventually gained enough popularity to become an official sport in a subsequent edition of the Games. Traditionally, the medals awarded for the demonstration events followed the same design as the Olympic medals, but of a smaller size. They are never included in the medal count.

Demonstration sports were suspended after the 1992 Summer Olympics, as the Olympic program grew bigger and it became more difficult for the organizing committees to give them the appropriate attention, since the IOC required the same treatment to be dispensed for official and demonstration sports. It is unlikely that they will be reintroduced as a requirement for future Olympic organizing committees. However, the Beijing Olympic Committee received permission from the IOC to run a wushu (martial arts) competition parallel to the 2008 Beijing Olympic Games, Wushu Tournament Beijing 2008.

From the 1984 Summer Olympics until the 2004 Summer Olympics, two Paralympic events (a men's and a women's wheelchair racing event) were included in the athletics programme of each Games. These events are considered by many as a demonstration sport, but were, in fact, used to promote the Paralympic Games. Disabled events in alpine and Nordic skiing (1988 only) were also held as demonstration sports at the 1984 and 1988 Winter Olympics.

== Summer Olympics ==
Below is the list of demonstration sports and additional sports at the Summer Olympic Games. Bold indicates a sport that was experimented with full metal status (under the event-based program that began with the 2020 Summer Olympics), while italics denote a sport that is not officially recognized as a demonstration sport by the IOC.

Games	Demonstration sports (1908–1992) Additional sports (2020–present)	Entered the Olympic program (where applicable)
1908 London (Note: Although demonstration sports were introduced only in 1912, some sports competitions were held simultaneously to the 1908 games.)	• cycle polo (men) • dueling (men)	
1912 Stockholm	• baseball (men) • glima (men)	• 1992 (Note: Baseball was officially removed from the Olympic program after the 2008 Summer Olympics.)
1920 Antwerp	• korfball (mixed)	
1924 Paris	• Basque pelota (men) • la canne (men) • canoeing and kayaking (men) • savate (men) • volleyball	• 1936 • 1964
1928 Amsterdam	• kaatsen (men) • korfball (mixed) • lacrosse (men)	
1932 Los Angeles	• American football (men) • lacrosse (men)	
1936 Berlin	• baseball (men) • gliding (men) • Indian sports: • kabaddi (men) • kho-kho • mallakhamb	• 1992
1948 London	• lacrosse (men) • Swedish (Ling) gymnastics (men and women)	
1952 Helsinki	• Finnish baseball (men) • handball (men)	• 1972 (Note: Was part of the program as field handball in 1936.)
1956 Melbourne	• Australian rules football (men) • baseball (men)	• 1992
1960 Rome	(none)	
1964 Tokyo	• baseball (men) • budō (men)	• 1992
1968 Mexico City	• Basque pelota (men) • tennis (men and women)	• 1988 (Note: Was part of the program between 1896 and 1924.)
1972 Munich	• badminton (men and women) • water skiing (men and women)	• 1992
1976 Montreal	(none)	
1980 Moscow	(none)	
1984 Los Angeles	• baseball (men) • tennis (men and women)	• 1992 • 1988
1988 Seoul	• badminton (men and women) • baseball (men) • bowling (men and women) • judo (women) • taekwondo (men and women)	• 1992 • 1992 • 1992 • 2000
1992 Barcelona	• Basque pelota (men and women) • roller hockey (men) • taekwondo (men and women)	• 2000
1996 Atlanta	(none)	
2000 Sydney	(none)	
2004 Athens	(none)	
2008 Beijing	(none) (Note: The IOC permitted a parallel wushu competition to be run (2008 Beijing Wushu Tournament), but this was not an official demonstration sport.)	
2012 London	(none)	
2016 Rio de Janeiro	(none) (Note: The IOC permitted a parallel esports competition to be run (known as the eGames), but this was not an official demonstration sport.)	
2020 Tokyo (Note: On 3 August 2016, the 129th IOC Session was held in Rio de Janeiro, Brazil. At this conference, the IOC agreed on a new policy to shift the Games to use an "event-based" program rather than a "sport-based" program. Under this new policy, the host organizing committee can propose the addition of sports to the program. Baseball/softball were added back to the program for 2020 only in this way, along with karate, sport climbing, surfing, and skateboarding.) (Note: Though not explicitly listed as a demonstration sport, the Japan Sumo Association originally planned to hold a special two-day exhibition sumo tournament between the Olympics and Paralympics as part of a larger official Olympics cultural festival; this was cancelled due to rescheduling of the 2020 Olympics to 2021.)	• **baseball** (men) • **softball** (women) • **karate** (men and women) • **sport climbing** (men and women) • **surfing** (men and women) • **skateboarding** (men and women)	• 2028 • 2028 • 2028
2024 Paris (Note: On 24 June 2019, the 134th IOC Session was held in Lausanne, Switzerland. At this conference, the Paris Organising Committee proposed that surfing, sport climbing, and skateboarding all return, along with the addition of breaking. On 7 December 2020, the IOC confirmed all four sports.) (Note: The organising committee permitted a dragon boat racing demonstration in Vaires-sur-Marne that was hosted by the International Canoe Federation.)	• **breaking** (men and women) • **sport climbing** (men and women) • **surfing** (men and women) • **skateboarding** (men and women)	• 2028 • 2028 • 2028
2028 Los Angeles	• **baseball** (men) / **softball** (women) • **cricket** • **flag football** • **lacrosse** • **squash**	
2032 Brisbane	TBC	

== Winter Olympics ==
Below is the list of demonstration sports at the Winter Olympic Games. Bold indicates a sport that was experimented with full medal status (under the event-based program that began with the 2022 Winter Olympics), while italics denote a sport that is not officially recognized as a demonstration sport by the IOC.

Games	Demonstration sports (1924–1992) Additional sports (2022–present)	Entered the Olympic program (where applicable)
1924 Chamonix	(none) (Note: Curling was part of the program in 1924; the IOC retroactively decided curling would be considered an official Olympic event preceding the 2002 games.)	
1928 St. Moritz	• military patrol (men) • skijoring (men)	
1932 Lake Placid	• curling (men) • sled dog racing (men) • speed skating (women)	• 1998 • 1960
1936 Garmisch-Partenkirchen	• military patrol (men) • ice stock sport (men)	
1948 St. Moritz	• military patrol (men) • winter pentathlon (men)	
1952 Oslo	• bandy (men)	
1956 Cortina d'Ampezzo	(none)	
1960 Squaw Valley	(none)	
1964 Innsbruck	• ice stock sport (men)	
1968 Grenoble	• ice dancing, then known as "rhythmic skating"	• 1976
1972 Sapporo	(none)	
1976 Innsbruck	(none)	
1980 Lake Placid	(none)	
1984 Sarajevo	• disabled alpine skiing (men)	
1988 Calgary	• curling (men and women) • freestyle skiing (men and women) • short track speed skating (men and women) • disabled alpine and Nordic skiing (men and women)	• 1998 • 1992 (moguls only) • 1992
1992 Albertville	• curling (men and women) • speed skiing (men and women) • freestyle skiing – aerials (men and women) • freestyle skiing – ski ballet (men and women)	• 1998 • 1994
1994 Lillehammer	(none)	
1998 Nagano	(none)	
2002 Salt Lake City	(none)	
2006 Turin	(none)	
2010 Vancouver	(none)	
2014 Sochi	(none)	
2018 Pyeongchang	(none) (Note: Though not listed as a demonstration sport, the Intel Extreme Masters held an esports tournament for two games (StarCraft II and Steep) with support from the IOC.)	
2022 Beijing	(none)	
2026 Milano Cortina	• **ski mountaineering** (men, women, and mixed team)	• 2030
2030 French Alps	TBD	
2034 Salt Lake City	TBD	

== Commonwealth Games ==
Demonstration sports have also been held during the Commonwealth Games, sometimes under the heading of exhibition sports.

Games	Demonstration sports	Entered the Commonwealth Games program (where applicable)
1958 Cardiff	• polo • show jumping	
1962 Perth	(none)	
1966 Kingston	(none)	
1970 Edinburgh	(none)	
1974 Christchurch	• artist gymnastics	• 1978
1978 Edmonton	• lacrosse	
1982 Brisbane	• Australian rules football • table tennis	• 2002
1986 Edinburgh	• judo	• 1990
1990 Auckland	• netball • triathlon	• 1998 • 2002
1994 Victoria	• para-athletics • para-swimming • para-lawn bowls	• 2002 • 2002 • 2002
1998 Kuala Lumpur	• sepak takraw • silambam • silat • wushu	
2002 Manchester	(none)	
2006 Melbourne	(none)	
2010 Delhi	(none)	
2014 Glasgow	(none) (Note: In 2014 and 2018, the CGF endorsed a rugby league nines competition that was held before the games, but this was not listed an official demonstration sport.)	
2018 Gold Coast	(none)	
2022 Birmingham	(none) (Note: The CGF endorsed an esports competition (Commonwealth Esports Championships) to be held during the games, but this was not listed an official demonstration sport.)	
2026 Glasgow	(none)	
2030 Ahmedabad	TBD	

== See also ==
- Commonwealth Games sports
- Olympic sports
- World Games sports
