= Parque Indoamericano =

Park in Argentina

Coordinates: 34°40′00″S 58°27′40″W

Parque Indoamericano (Indoamerican Park) is a park in the Villa Soldati and Villa Lugano neighbourhoods of Buenos Aires, Argentina. It covers approximately 130 hectares (320 acres), and is thus the second-biggest park in the city.

== Overview ==
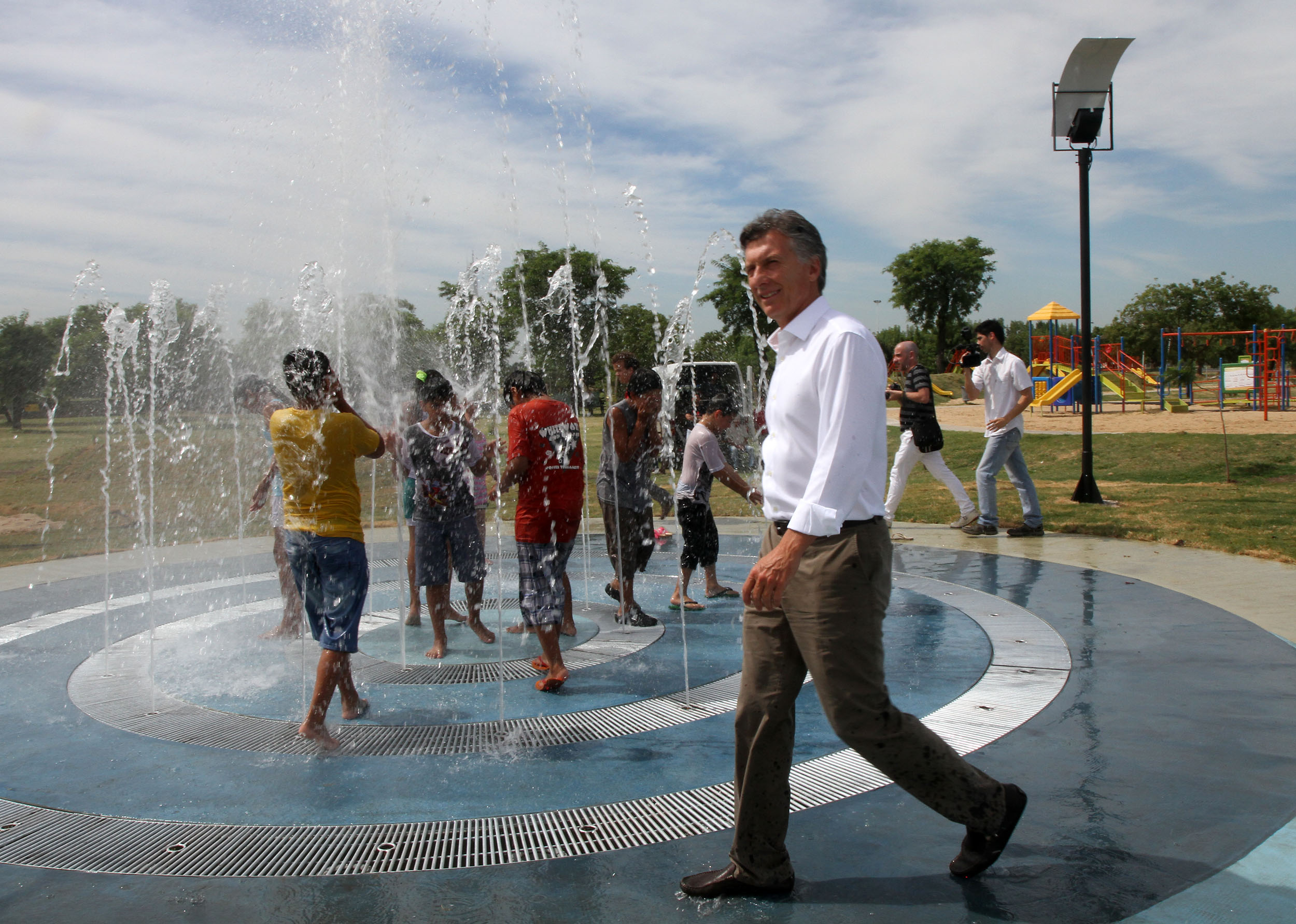
Mayor Mauricio Macri surveys new playground installations in Indoamerican Park.

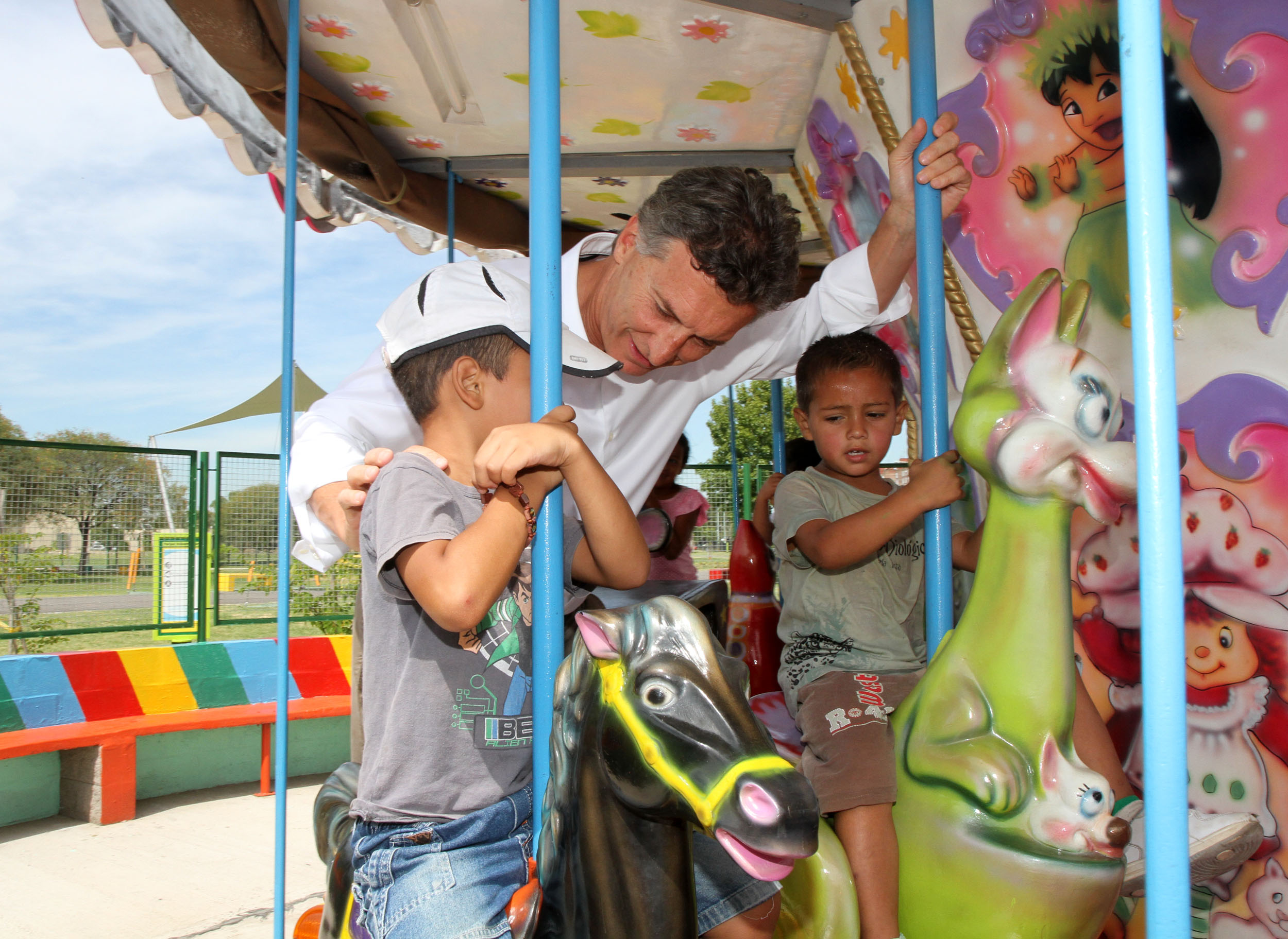
Mayor Macri with neighborhood children in a new carousel at the park.

Located on a flood-prone plain in what was, until the middle of the 20th century, the southwestern outskirts of Buenos Aires, the park began to take shape during the 1960s, when the area was designated as the Parque Almirante Brown redevelopment zone. The construction of public housing followed, and Mayor Francisco Rabanal had the Cildáñez Stream tubed for flood control in 1966.

The military-appointed administration of Mayor Osvaldo Cacciatore announced plans in 1978 to convert the undeveloped plain into a public recreational area through two projects: the Parque de la Ciudad (an amusement park) and the Parque Zoofitogeográfico.

The latter would include an arboretum and be the new location for the Buenos Aires Zoo. The amusement park was inaugurated in 1982, but an economic crisis and irregularities in the contact for the arboretum's development and concession led to the project's cancellation (the zoo remained in its Palermo neighborhood location).

The park, located far from most of the city's residential or business areas, suffered from neglect in the ensuing years, and what would have been a reservoir along its northern end, Lake Soldati, became a shantytown known as Los Piletones. UCR Councilman Carlos Louzán ultimately obtained passage of a resolution for the construction of a city park in the remaining areas 1993, and on December 1, 1995, Mayor Jorge Domínguez inaugurated the Parque Indoamericano.

His successor, Mayor Fernando de la Rúa, inaugurated the Paseo Islas Malvinas ("Malvinas Islands Promenade") in April 1999. The promenade features a memorial to the fallen, including an eternal flame and 649 cypresses (one for each fallen Argentine serviceman in the 1982 conflict). Mayor Jorge Telerman followed these works with the December 2006 inaugural of the Paseo de los Derechos Humanos ("Human Rights Promenade"), a memorial to the questionable 30,000 dissidents killed during the Dirty War thirty years earlier.

== Incidents at the park in 2010 ==
These improvements, built mainly along the park's western end, left much of the extensive area still undeveloped. Cabinet Chief Aníbal Fernández stated "It's not a park. It's just a field with lots of weeds on it." Flanked by shantytowns on both the northern and southern ends, much of the remaining prairie in the Indoamerican Park was occupied by squatters on December 9, 2010. A census of the occupants was conducted four days after the takeover, and reported 13,333 persons in the park; at least 80% of the more than 13,000 squatters, colloquially known as Okupas from ocupar in Spanish, had homes in one of the slums outside the park. The major influx of people residing in the park and on its margins has been blamed on the expansion of export-oriented agribusiness, and specifically soybean production, in the Argentinean countryside which led to widespread displacement of rural populations.

=== Riots ===
The squatters were mostly Bolivian and Paraguayan in origin, and reaction from the largely working class residents in the park's vicinity was, at times, violent. Two deaths among the squatters were reported: Bernardo Salgueiro (22 years old, Paraguayan) and Rosemarie Churapuña (28 years old, Bolivian) died. The deaths of 1 Paraguayan and 3 Bolivians were reported in Paraguayan media. Clashes between police and the squatters have left three people dead and 14 others injured according to CNN. The standoff also prompted a political conflict between the Mayor of Buenos Aires Mauricio Macri (who was called a "xenophobe" by the President's Cabinet Chief, Aníbal Fernández) and the President of Argentina, Cristina Fernández de Kirchner.

National Border Guards and the Navy's Albatross Special Forces secured the perimeter of the park and prevented the ingression of persons not previously living in the park and any construction materials. After an agreement between Macri and Kirchner in which the city will match funds provided by the central government to the squatters, Chief Cabinet secretary Aníbal Fernández announced the clearing of the park via a Twitter post shortly after 6:30am local time. After initial deadlock in negotiations between the national and city governments, both jurisdictions eventually reached an agreement to clear the park of illegal inhabitants, including providing low-cost loans for housing construction to former squatters; the park was cleared by the morning of 15 December 2010.

=== Reactions ===
- The President of Bolivia, Evo Morales, called on Bolivians in the park to disperse, stating that their actions decrease the status of all Bolivians in Argentina.
- Mayor Mauricio Macri called the incident "an uncontrolled migration" and said that the city government will continue working to "recover the park".
- María Eugenia Vidal, the minister of social development, stated that the national government will continue to distribute food around the park.
- Buenos Aires City Cabinet Chief Horacio Rodríguez Larreta stated that "there is a mafia behind the situation at the Parque Indoamericano, which is trying to make a business by dividing the park into lots and offering the pieces of land to the neighbours of Villa Soldati", and that the squatters' leader Alejandro Salvatierra "is a Kirchnerite picketer that works for former education minister Daniel Filmus; Salvatierra is the one who encouraged the squatters to take the park."

== See also ==
- Villa Miseria
