= Estadio Mary Terán de Weiss =

Stadium in Buenos Aires, Argentina

Mary Terán de Weiss Stadium
- Estadio Mary Terán de Weiss
- Parque Roca

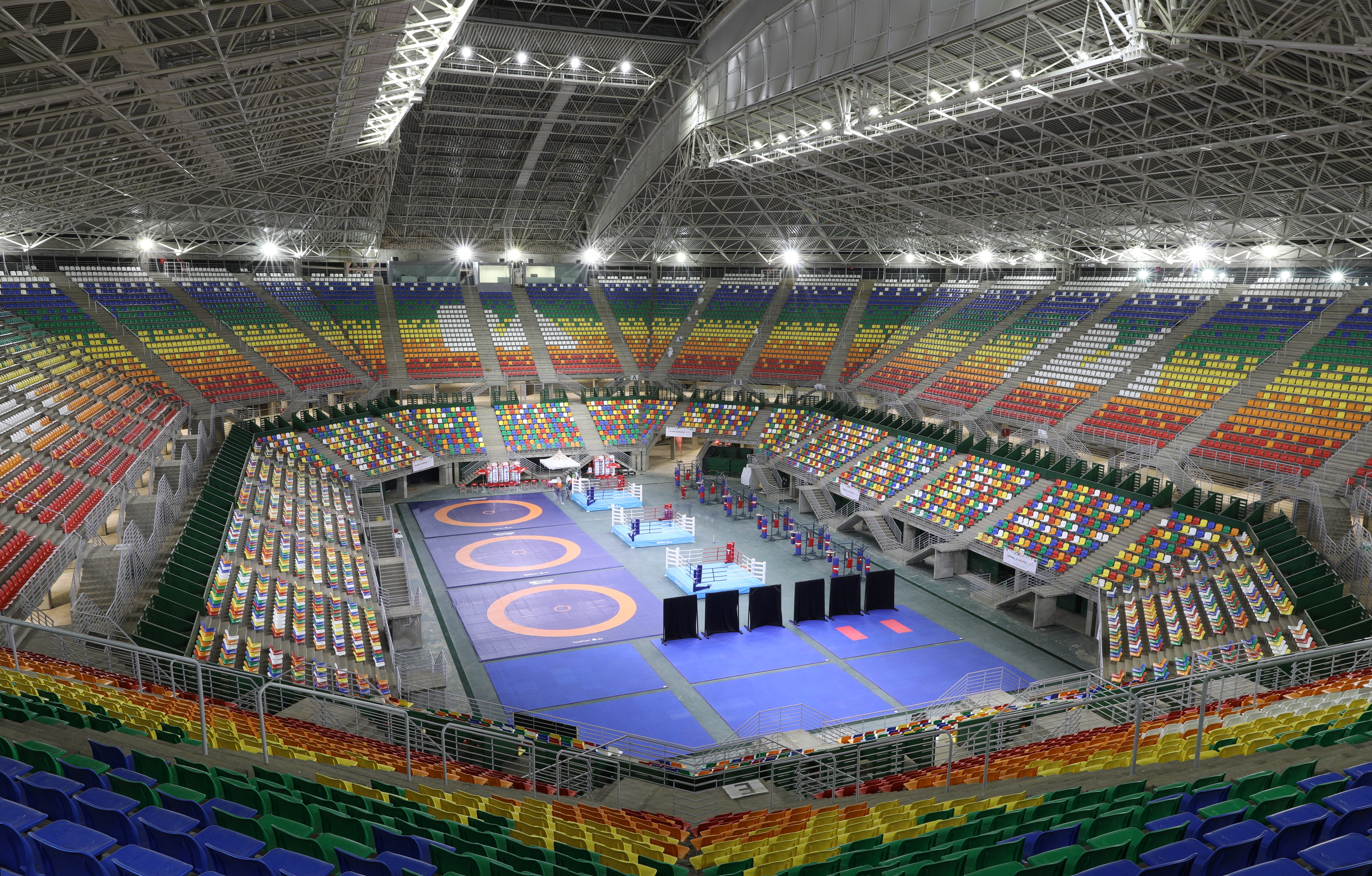
- The stadium in 2018
- Interactive map of Mary Terán de Weiss Stadium
- Full name: Estadio Mary Terán de Weiss
- Location: Buenos Aires, Argentina
- Coordinates: 34°40′38″S 58°26′46″W
- Owner: City of Buenos Aires
- Capacity: 15,500
- Surface: Clay

Construction
- Opened: September 2006; 20 years ago
- Renovated: 2015–18
- Cost: ARS $ 11.5 million USD $ 3.71 million
- Architect: GGMPU Arquitectos

Tenant
- Argentina Davis Cup team

The Estadio Mary Terán de Weiss, commonly known as Parque Roca due to its location within the limits of the Parque Polideportivo Roca, is a multi-purpose stadium in Buenos Aires, Argentina. The stadium, owned and operated by the Government of Buenos Aires, is located at Avenida Coronel Roca and Avenida Escalada in the Villa Soldati neighborhood.

The stadium, named after Argentinian tennis player Mary Terán de Weiss, has a capacity of 15,500 spectators. The first phase of construction cost 11.5 million Argentine pesos (approximately US$3.71 million). Former Buenos Aires mayor Jorge Telerman officially opened the stadium on September 19, 2006. The first official event to take place in the stadium was a semifinal of the 2006 Davis Cup, between Argentina and Australia, on September 22–24, with the Argentine team winning, 5–0.

== Construction ==
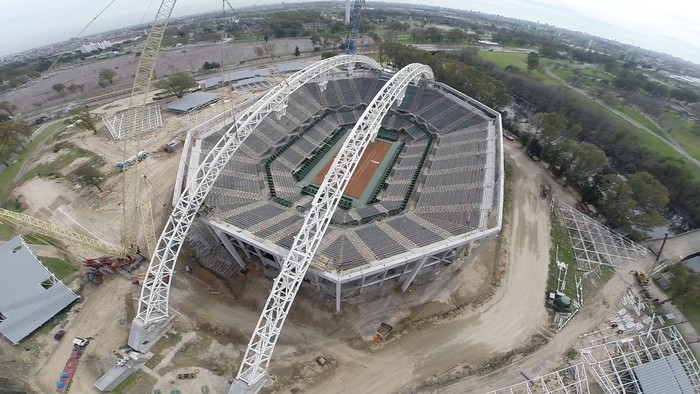
The stadium in 2015

The stadium has four main spectator areas: court-level boxes, lower and upper grandstand decks, and upper enclosed boxes. Below the grandstands are locker rooms, a large gymnasium, and offices. In 2014 works for a permanent facade and retractable roof were started. When finished, it will be the largest-capacity indoor arena in Buenos Aires with a seating capacity being expanded to 15,500. The stadium will be able to host many events besides tennis, including basketball, volleyball, and artistic and cultural fairs.

== Ciudad del Básquet ==
The Buenos Aires government signed an agreement with the Argentine Basketball Federation that the Argentina national basketball team will play exclusively at the Mary Terán de Weiss stadium, once it is roofed in 2007. Also, during the first phase of construction in 2007, the Ciudad del Básquet will be built. The complex inside Parque Roca will serve as a training and practice center for the national teams, similar to the facility the national football team has in Ezeiza.

== Events ==
- 2006 South American Games
- 2006 Davis Cup
- 2008 Davis Cup
- 2009 Davis Cup
- 2011 Davis Cup
- 2012 Davis Cup
- 2013 Davis Cup
- 2018 UFC Fight Night: Magny vs. Ponzinibbio
- 2022 Futsal Finalissima

== See also ==
- List of tennis stadiums by capacity

Preceded by Estádio do Mangueirão; Belém	South American Games; Main Venue; 2006	Succeeded by Estadio Atanasio Girardot; Medellín
