= Youth Olympic Village (Buenos Aires) =

Olympic Village of the Buenos Aires 2018 Youth Olympic Games

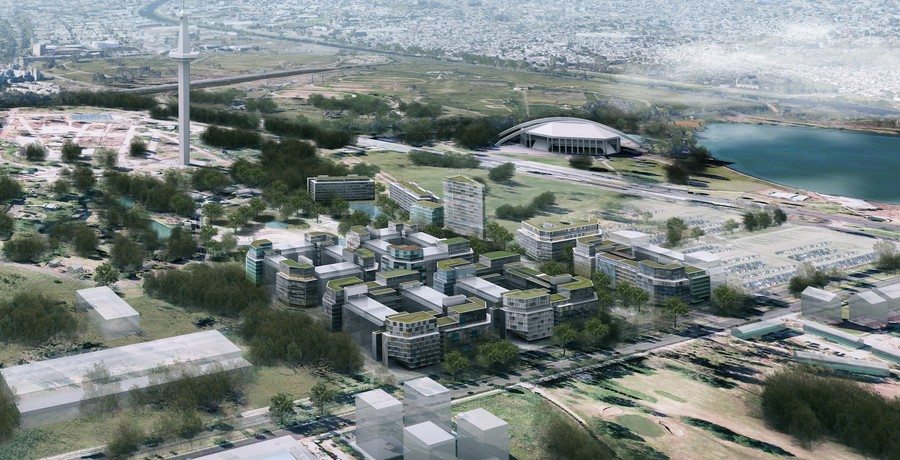
Youth Olympic Village for the Buenos Aires 2018 Youth Olympic Games.

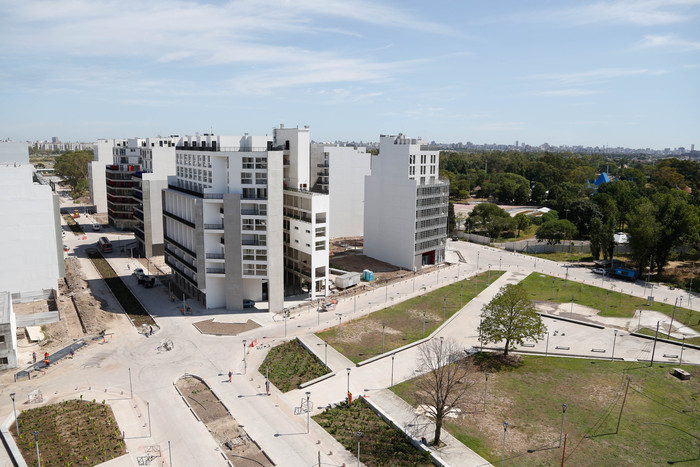
Youth Olympic Village, February 2018.

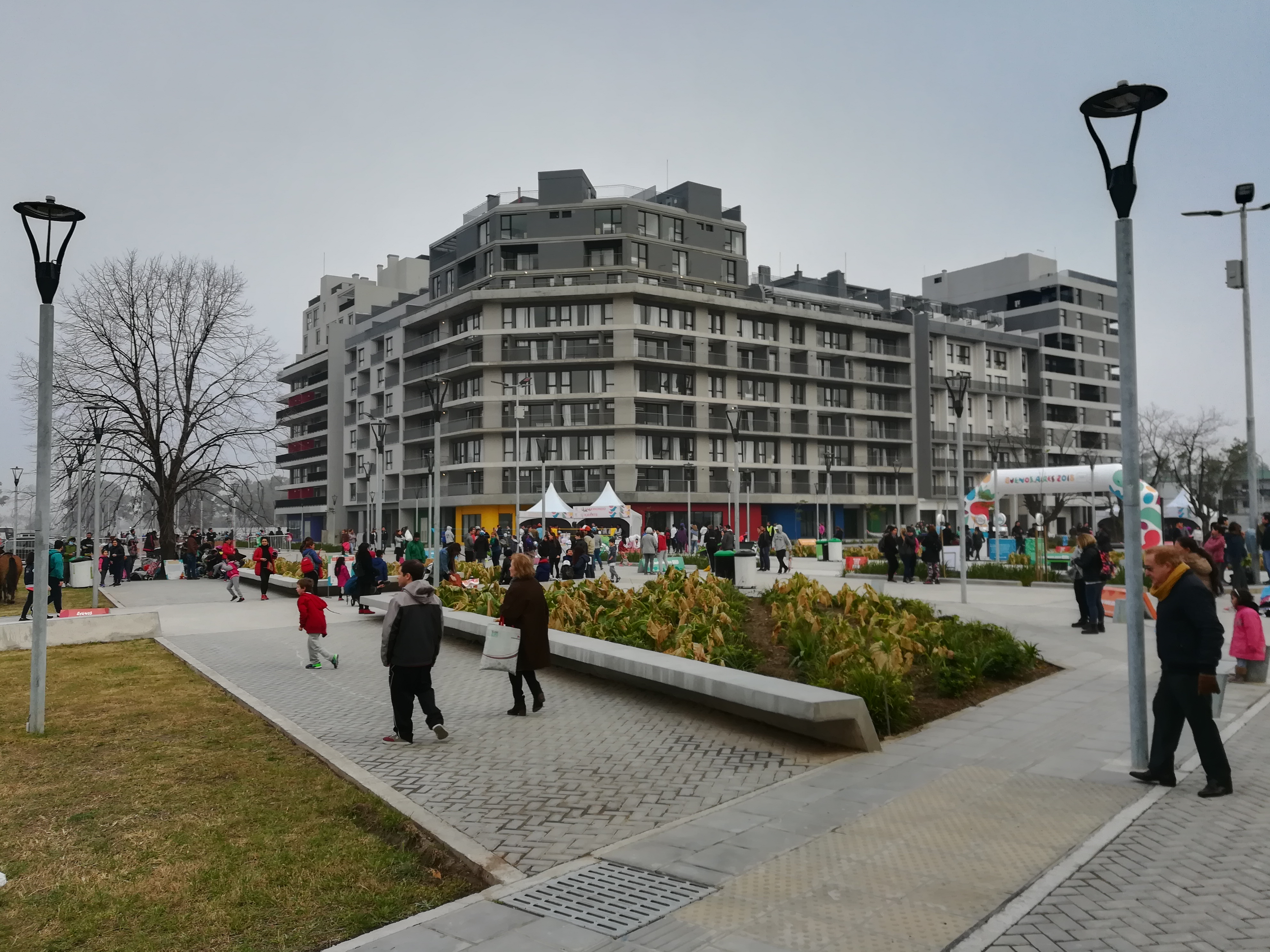
Youth Olympic Village, June 2018.

The Youth Olympic Village is an Olympic Village built for the 2018 Summer Youth Olympics in the district of Villa Soldati, a southern neighborhood of Buenos Aires. The village also hosted the closing ceremony.

It is located within the limits of the City Park, next to the Roca Park and the Predio Ferial Olímpico. It consists of 1440 new apartments on 32 six-storeys buildings, totaling around 160,000 m^{2}. During the YOG the village hosted 7500 people, 30% of which were located in 40 m^{2} apartments, with 4 beds, 2 bedrooms and one bathroom; while the other 70% lived in 65 m^{2} apartments, with 6 beds, 3 bedrooms and two bathrooms.

The design of the buildings of the Olympic Village was the result of six architectural competitions: five for the housing sector and a sixth for the fairgrounds. Each housing module includes elements of all the winning projects, this way the village achieves the architectural diversity of a big city.

The first foundation stone for the Athletes' Village was laid on May 6, 2016, and it should be finished by December, 2017.

This area can be reached by Premetro tram at Cecilia Grierson station, or by the southern Metrobus line.
