= Weightlifting at the 2018 Summer Youth Olympics – Girls' 44 kg =

Girls' 44 kg at the III Summer Youth Olympic Games
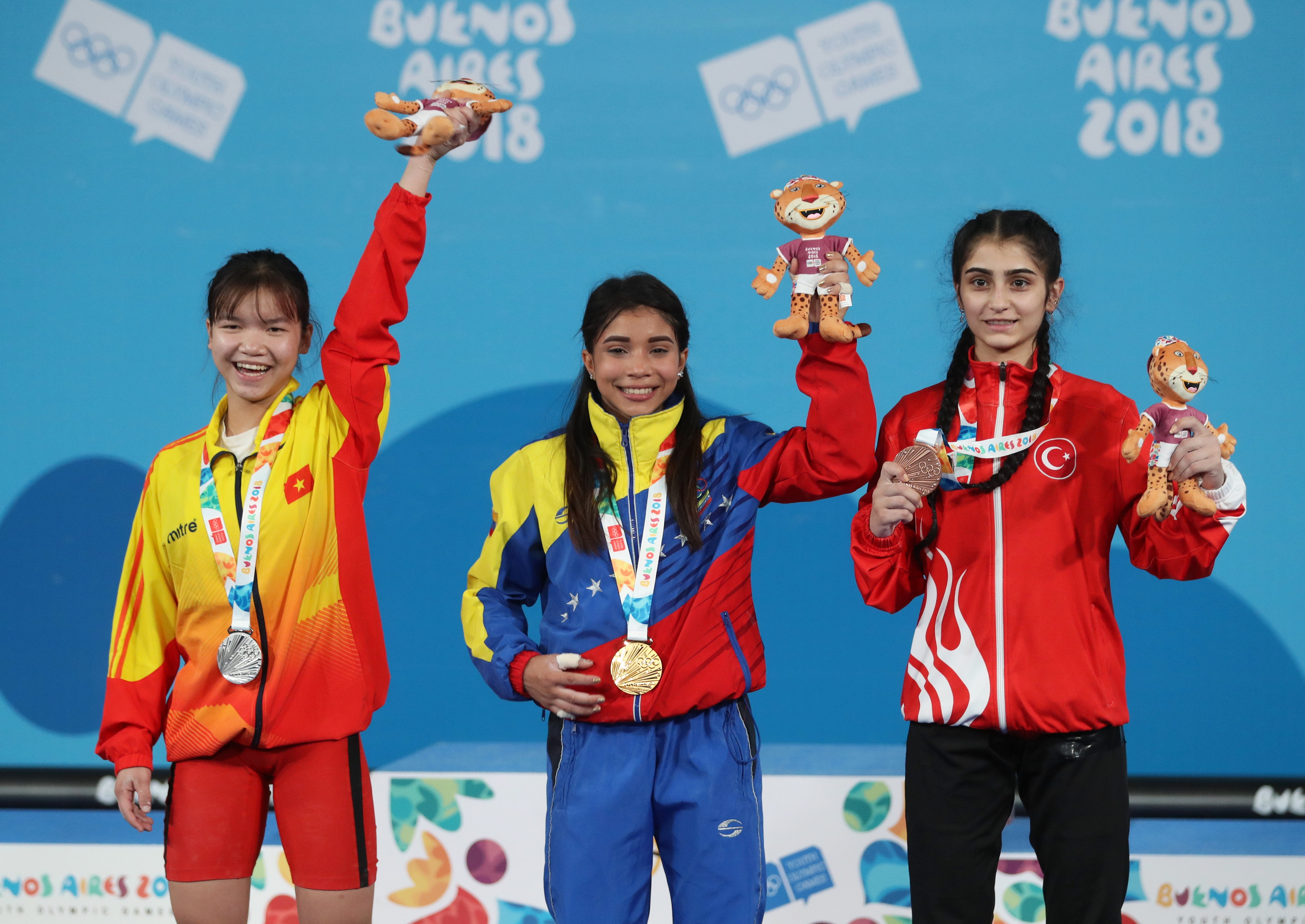
- Victory ceremony
- Venue: Parque Polideportivo Roca
- Dates: 7 October
- Competitors: 5 from 5 nations

Medalists
1st place, gold medalist(s)		Katherin Echandía; Venezuela
2nd place, silver medalist(s)		Nguyễn Thị Thu Trang; Vietnam
3rd place, bronze medalist(s)		Nida Karasakal; Turkey

These are the results for the girls' 44 kg event at the 2018 Summer Youth Olympics.

== Results ==
Rank	Name	Nation	Body Weight	Snatch (kg)				Clean & Jerk (kg)				Total (kg)
Rank	Name	Nation	Body Weight	1	2	3	Res	1	2	3	Res	Total (kg)
1st place, gold medalist(s)	Katherin Echandía	Venezuela		67	70	72	72	88	90	~~93~~	90	162
2nd place, silver medalist(s)	Nguyễn Thị Thu Trang	Vietnam		~~68~~	68	72	72	75	~~89~~	~~89~~	75	147
3rd place, bronze medalist(s)	Nida Karasakal	Turkey		57	60	~~63~~	60	73	75	78	78	138
4	Adamaris Santiago	Puerto Rico		52	55	~~60~~	55	70	73	~~75~~	73	128
5	Berthine Ravakiniaina	Madagascar		35	40	~~45~~	40	47	50	~~53~~	50	90

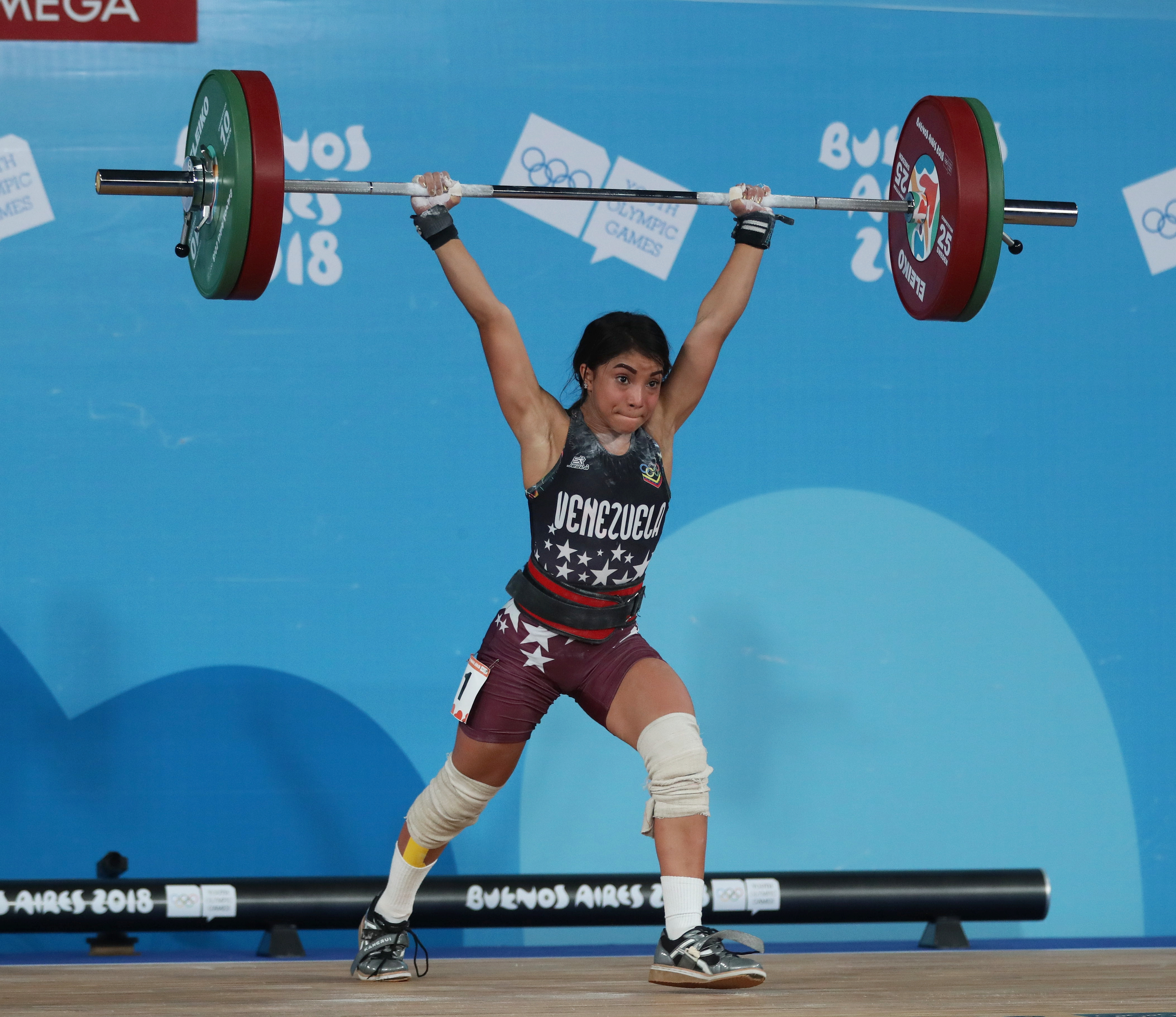
Katherin Oriana Echandia Zarate

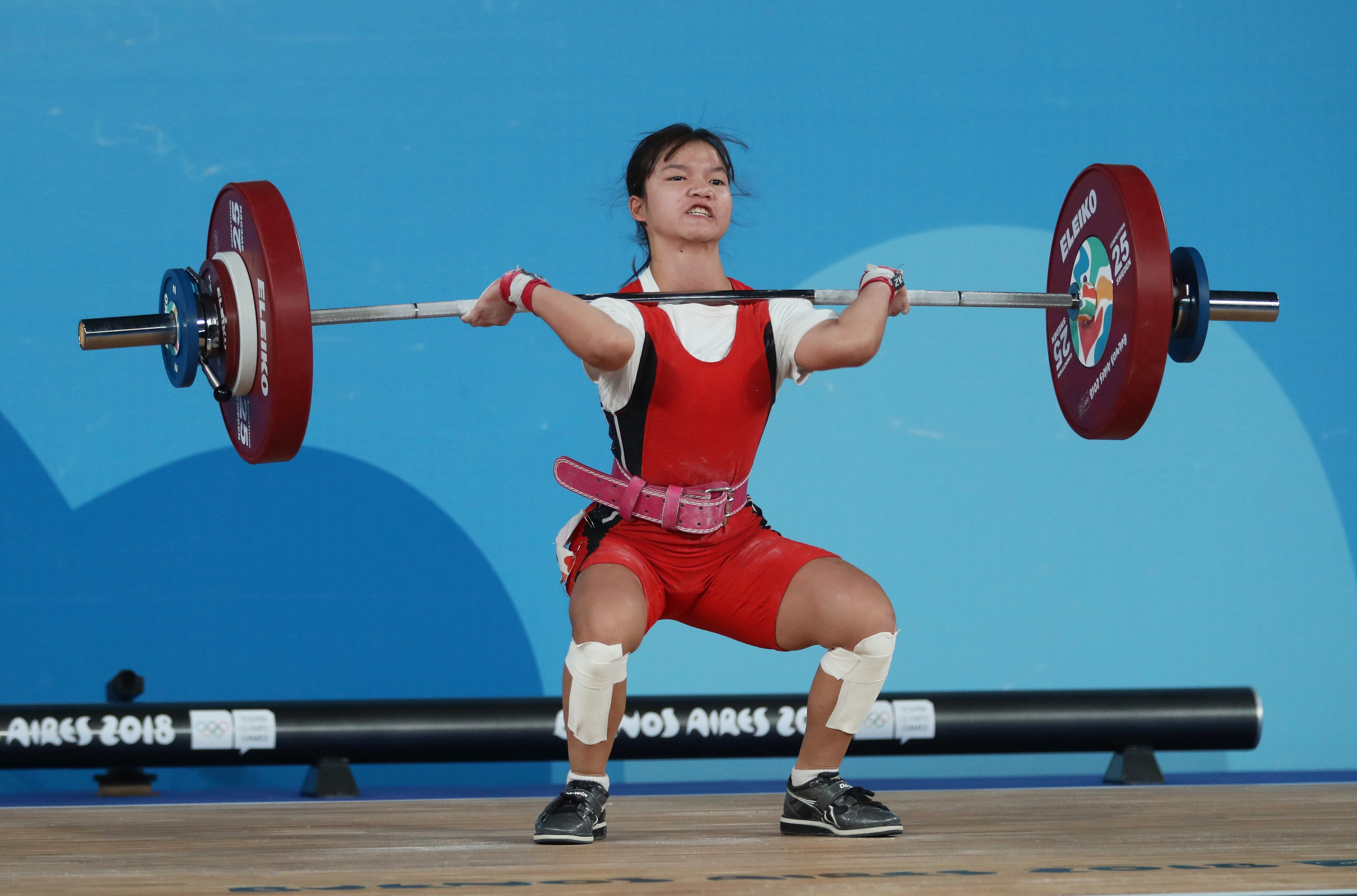
Nguyễn Thị Thu Trang

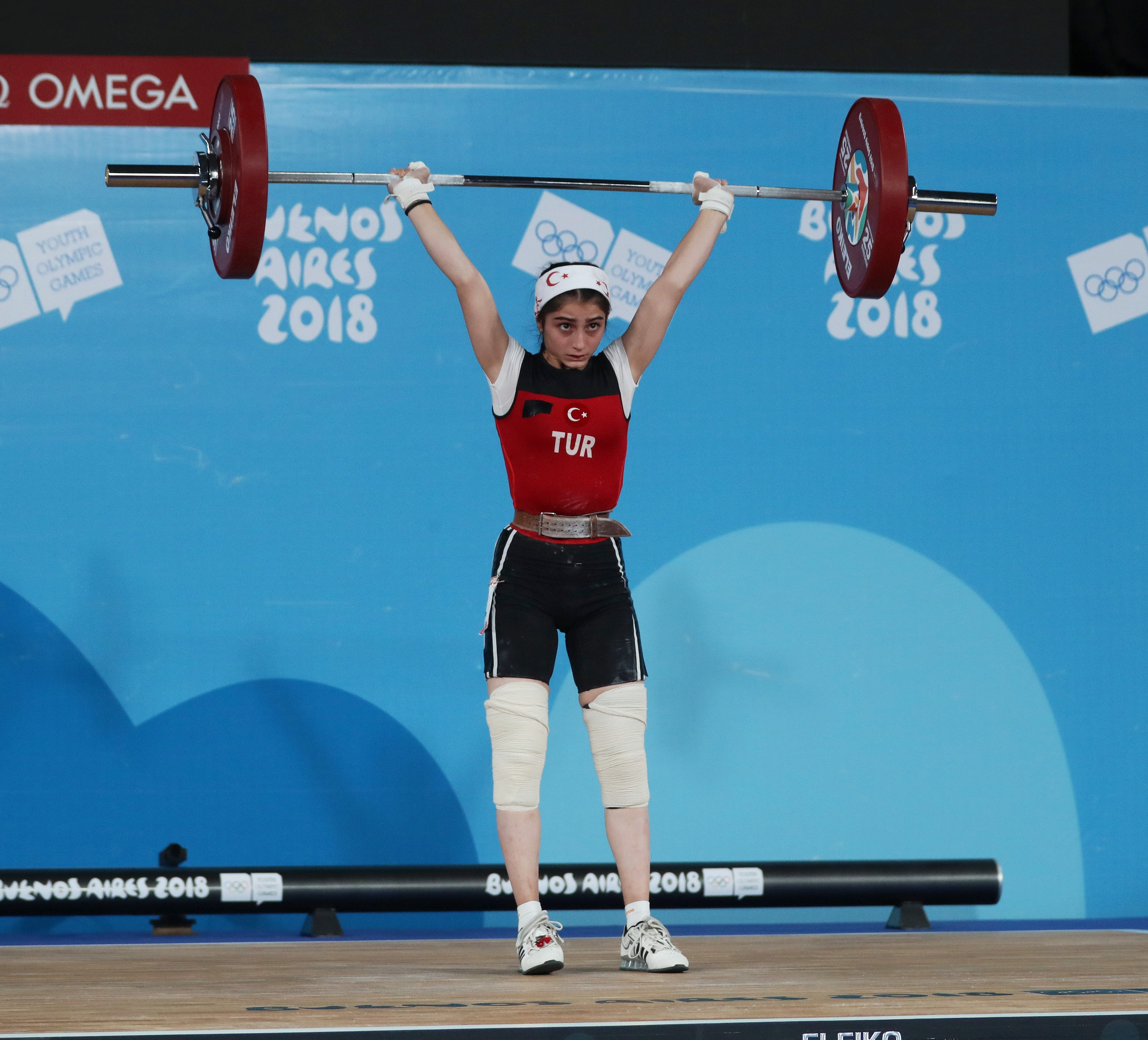
Nida Karasakal
