= Torre Espacial =

Coordinates: 34°40′21″S 58°26′59″W

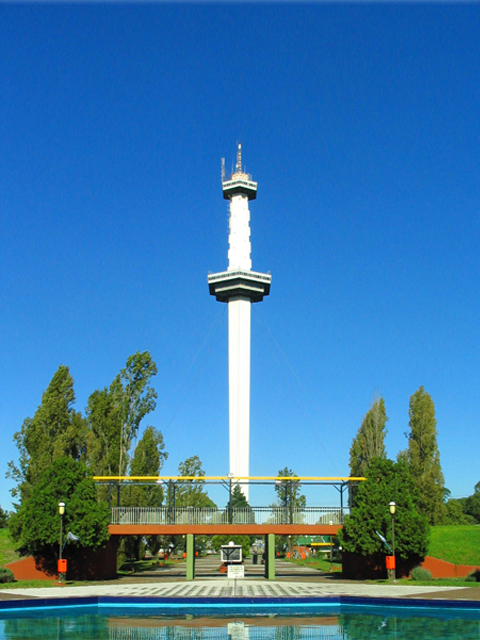
- Interactive map of the Torre Espacial area

General information
- Status: Completed
- Type: Observation tower
- Location: Parque de la Ciudad; Villa Soldati, Buenos Aires
- Construction started: September 1979
- Completed: May 1981
- Inaugurated: July 9, 1985

Height
- Height: 200 metres (660 ft) (not including antenna)

Design and construction
- Architects: Peter Totter, Wilhelm Dietrich, Peter Wader
- Developer: Interama S.A.
- Main contractor: Waagner-Biro

Torre Espacial, or Torre Interama, is a 200 metres (660 ft) high observation tower in the Villa Soldati section of Buenos Aires, Argentina.

The tower was designed and manufactured in Austria by Waagner-Biro, and built between 1980 and May 1981 for the Parque de la Ciudad amusement park. The bankruptcy of the amusement park's developer, Interama S.A., delayed delivery of the observation tower components; the tower was finally opened to the public on July 9, 1985. It features observation decks at 120, 124, and 176 meters; from the highest deck it is possible to see the Uruguay coast.

The Torre Espacial was declared a City Cultural Landmark on November 22, 2010. It was closed in 2003 but following renovation works was reopened on November 26, 2011.
