= EGames =

eGames can refer to

- eGames (esports), an international eSports competition
- eGames (video game developer), based in Langhorne, Pennsylvania, US
