= Nida Karasakal =

Turkish olympic weightlifter

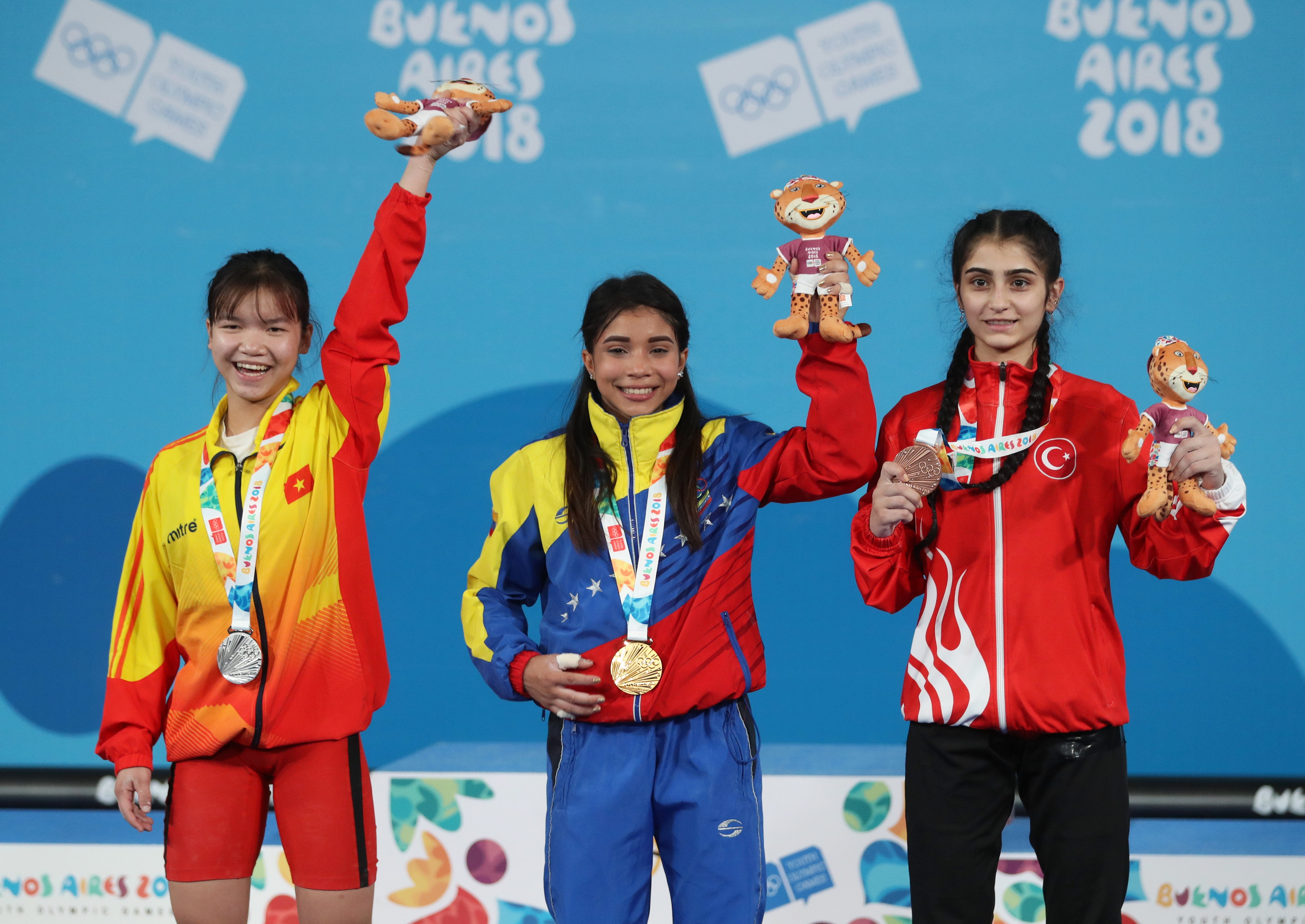
- Karasakal (right) with Katherin Oriana Echandia Zarate and Nguyễn Thị Thu Trang at the 2018 Summer Youth Olympics

Sport
- Country: Turkey
- Sport: Weightlifting
Medal record
Weightlifting
Representing Turkey
Youth Olympic Games
Bronze medal – third place	2018 Buenos Aires	Girls' 44 kg

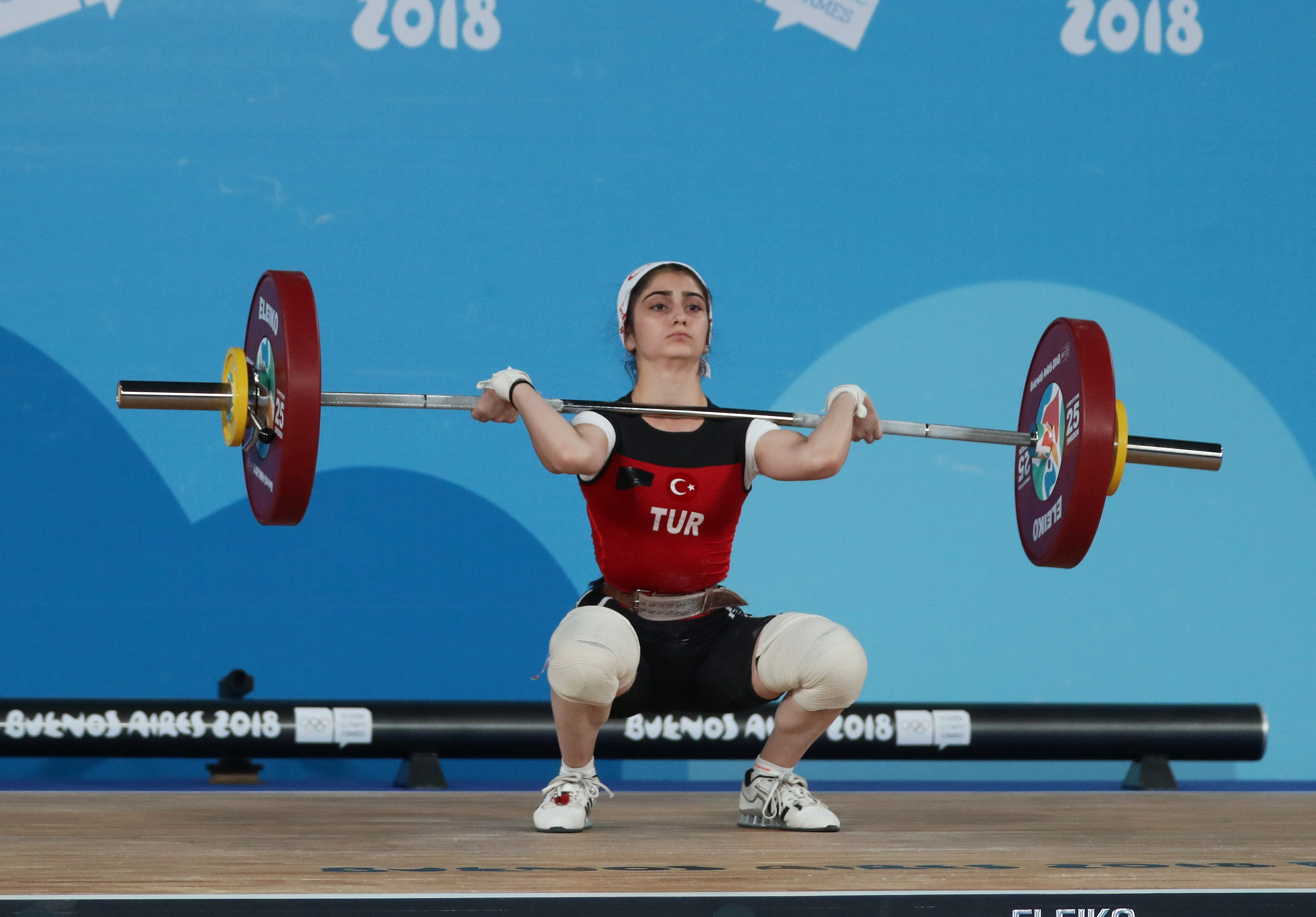
Karasakal at the 2018 Summer Youth Olympics

Nida Karasakal is a Turkish olympic weightlifter. She competed in the Weightlifting at the 2018 Summer Youth Olympics, winning the bronze medal in the girls' 44 kg event.
