= Villa Soldati bus-train collision =

Bus-train collision in Buenos Aires, Argentina

Coordinates: 34°39′56″S 58°26′57″W

Villa Soldati level crossing disaster
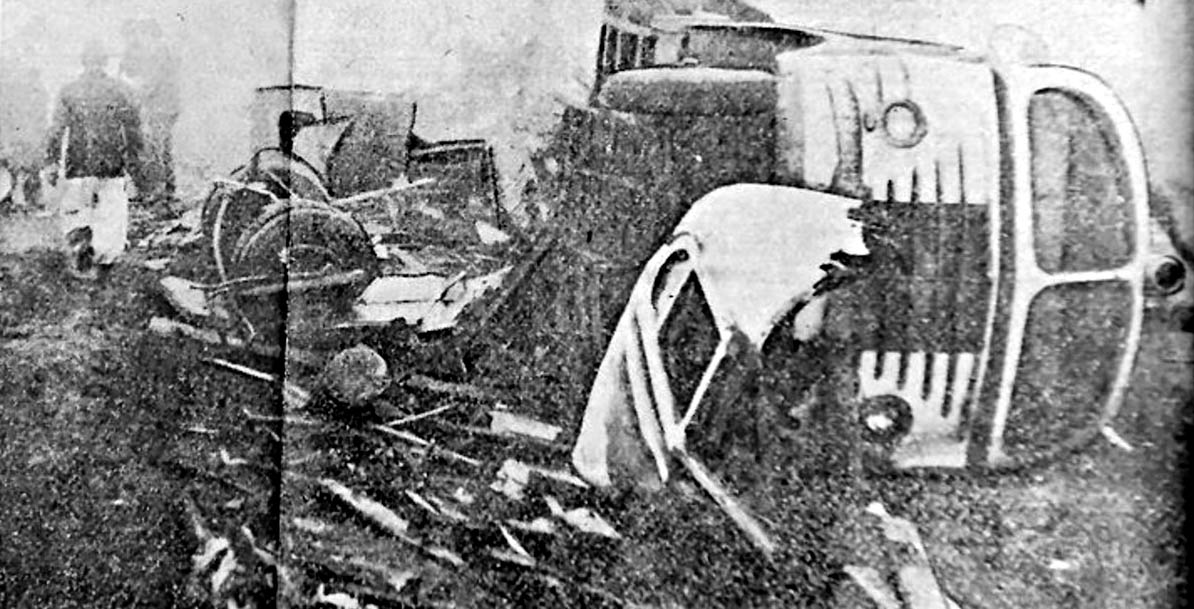
- The bus after the impact

Details
- Date: June 11, 1962
- Location: Villa Soldati, Buenos Aires
- Country: Argentina
- Line: Belgrano Sur Line
- Operator: Ferrocarriles Argentinos
- Incident type: Level crossing collision
- Cause: Crossing operator error

Statistics
- Trains: 1
- Deaths: 33
- Injured: 83

The Villa Soldati level crossing disaster occurred on the morning of June 11, 1962 in the Villa Soldati neighborhood of Buenos Aires, when, in dense fog, a train struck a municipal bus carrying schoolchildren.

It was one of the worst accidents in the city of Buenos Aires, with the number of fatal victims estimated between 31 and 42. (Note: The number of dead persons reported is unclear so the information provided by different newspapers varied. In fact, Clarín reported 31 dead, while La Nación reported "more than 40" and La Razón, 31 fatal victims.)

== Accident ==
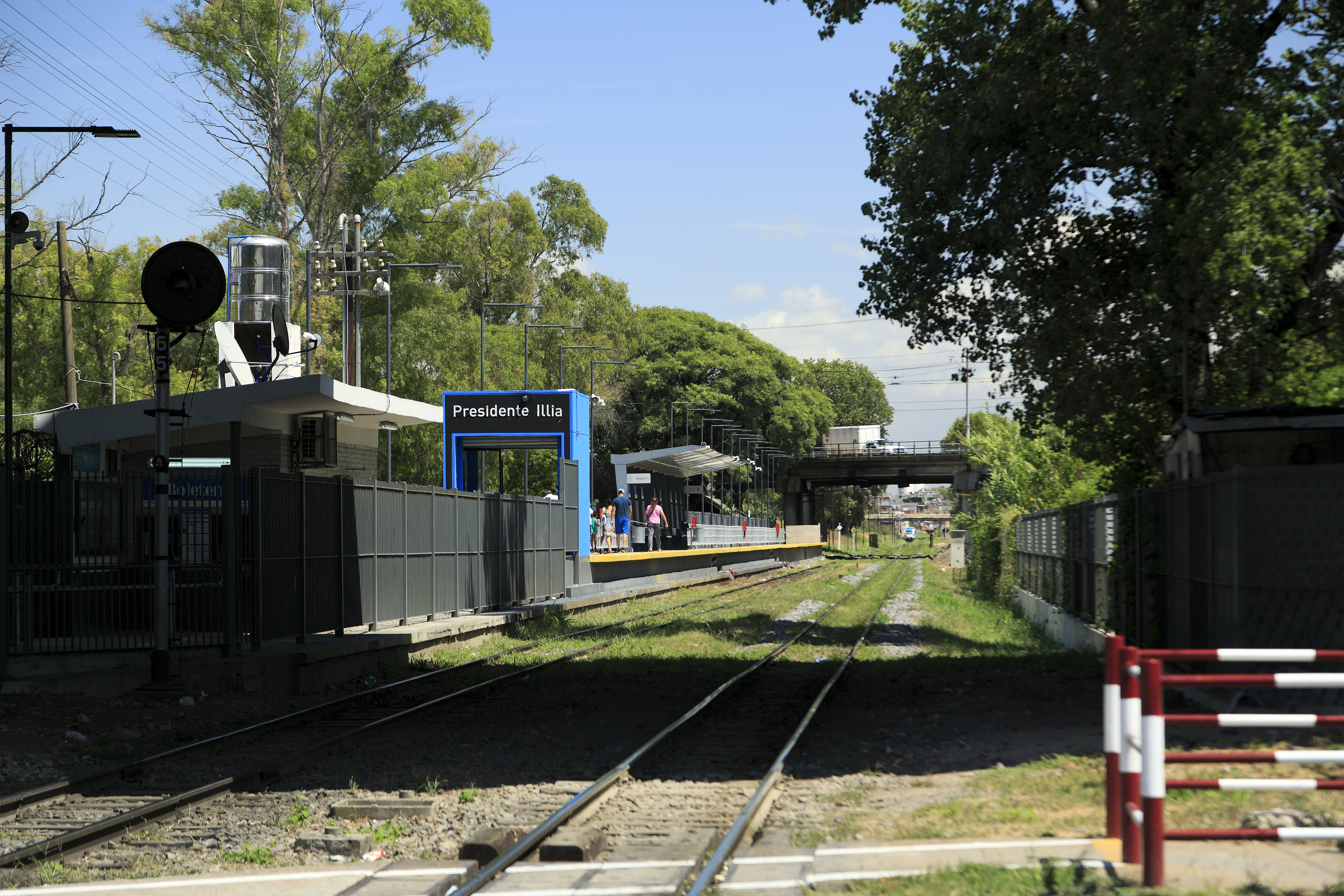
Presidente Illia station is located next to the Avenida Lacarra level crossing, where the accident occurred

The accident happened near Presidente Illia station, where the Belgrano Sur Line train that ran towards the Buenos Aires station crossed Lacarra Avenue at its junction with Veracruz street. The crossing attendant, believing the crossing to be clear, opened the barriers to allow a truck to cross. The truck was followed by the bus, which was carrying 120 children. The bus driver did not hear the warning bell until it was too late. The impact of the train virtually destroyed the bus and pushed part of it 150 yards down the track.

Dozens of ambulances and a hundred doctors arrived at the scene. The injured were taken to four different hospitals where a shortage of blood and plasma resulted in an appeal for blood donors, to which 1,500 people responded. Many children were taken to Hospital Piñero in a truck driven by the owner of a nearby greengrocer, while others were taken by colectivos 150 and 101 and firetrucks. At the moment of the accident, the visibility was very low due to thick fog, which was a major cause of the accident.

== Victims ==
As a result, 33 people were killed and 83 injured. Other than the bus driver and a female teacher, the dead were children less than 13-years-old. There were no casualties on the train. Most of the children lived at a shanty town on Lacarra street and were less than 6 years old.

A monument was built after the tragedy, marking the scene of the accident.
