= Facundo Suárez Lastra =

Argentine politician

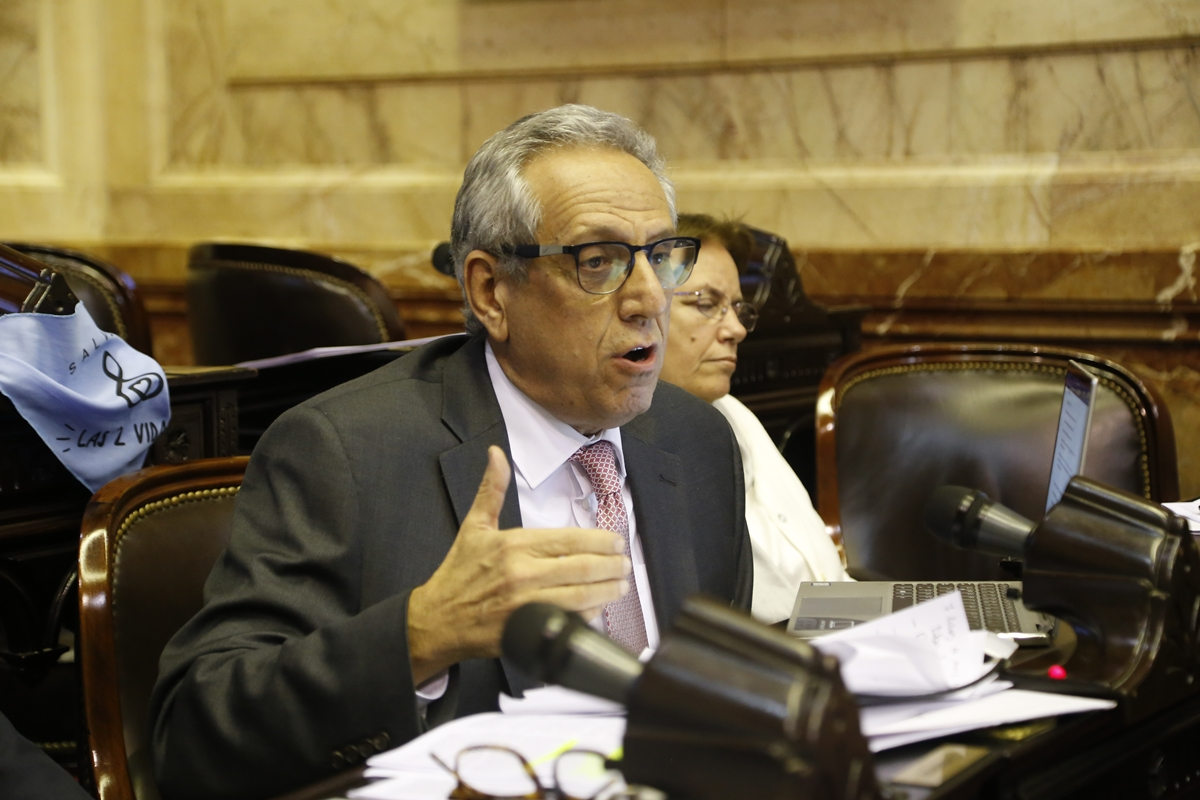

National Deputy
- In office 10 December 2017 – 10 December 2021
- Constituency: City of Buenos Aires

Secretary of Justice and Security of Buenos Aires City
- In office 7 August 2000 – 19 March 2002
- Mayor: Aníbal Ibarra
- Preceded by: Post established
- Succeeded by: Juan Carlos López

Legislator of the City of Buenos Aires
- In office 10 December 1997 – 7 August 2000

Mayor of Buenos Aires
- In office 14 January 1987 – 8 July 1989
- Preceded by: Julio César Saguier
- Succeeded by: Carlos Grosso

Personal details
- Born: 24 February 1954 (age 72) Mendoza, Argentina
- Party: Radical Civic Union
- Other political affiliations: FREPASO (1994–2001); Juntos por el Cambio (2015–present)
- Education: University of Buenos Aires

Facundo Ernesto Suárez Lastra (born 24 February 1954) is the Argentine politician of the Radical Civic Union. Suárez Lastra has held a number of important positions throughout his career; most notably, he was intendente (mayor) of Buenos Aires from 1987 to 1989, during the presidency of Raúl Alfonsín. From 2017 to 2021, he was a National Deputy elected in the Federal Capital.

In Buenos Aires, Suárez Lastra has also served as a member of the City Legislature, as Secretary of Justice and Security, during the mayorship of Aníbal Ibarra, and as Secretary of Government, during the mayorship of Julio César Saguier.

== Early life and education ==
Suárez Lastra was born on 24 February 1954 in Mendoza, in a prominent political family. His father was Facundo Suárez, a UCR politician, who was Secretary of Intelligence during the presidency of Raúl Alfonsín and president of Yacimientos Petrolíferos Fiscales during the presidency of Arturo Illia.

Suárez Lastra moved to Buenos Aires to study law at the University of Buenos Aires, where he became politically active in the Franja Morada, the Radical Civic Union's student wing. He would later become Secretary of the Argentine University Federation (FUA).

== Political career ==
Suárez Lastra's political career began when he was appointed to the City Council in 1983. Later, during the mayorship of Julio César Saguier, Suárez Lastra was appointed Secretary of Government of the City, a post he held until Saguier's death in 1987. Suárez Lastra was appointed intendente of Buenos Aires by President Raúl Alfonsín in Saguier's stead. Aged 32 at the time, Suárez Lastra became the youngest mayor in the city's history.

His term as mayor of Buenos Aires saw a moderate extension of the Buenos Aires Underground, as new stations were inaugurated in Line D and the Premetro. His term ended upon the resignation of Alfonsín from the presidency, as Buenos Aires lacked constitutional autonomy at the time and the mayor was directly appointed by the president. He was succeeded by Carlos Menem's appointee, Carlos Grosso.

In 2000, during the mayorship of Aníbal Ibarra, of FREPASO, Suárez Lastra was the city's Secretary of Justice and Security. He resigned two years later due to conflicts between the national government and the city government regarding the incorporation of federal police and judicial officials to the city's own security force.

=== National Deputy ===
Suárez Lastra ran for a seat in the Argentine Chamber of Deputies in the 2017 legislative election; he was the seventh candidate in the Vamos Juntos (Cambiemos) list in Buenos Aires. The list was the most voted in the city, with 50.98% of the vote, and Suárez Lastra was elected.

As a national deputy, Suárez Lastra was a vocal supporter of the legalization of abortion in Argentina. He voted in favor of the two Voluntary Interruption of Pregnancy bills that were debated by the Argentine Congress in 2018 and 2020. His support for the bills led to protests in front of his private residence in Buenos Aires, which were condemned by politicians across the political spectrum.

Ahead of the 2021 primary election, Suárez Lastra was confirmed as one of the candidates for re-election in the "Adelante Ciudad" list. The list lost in the Juntos por el Cambio primaries, and Suárez Lastra was dropped from the final JxC list that competed in the general election. His term expired on 10 December 2021.
