= Guillermo del Cioppo =

Argentine politician (1937–2017)

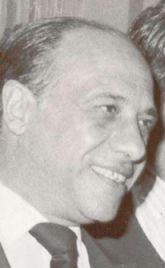

63rd Mayor of Buenos Aires
- In office 31 March 1982 – 10 December 1983
- Preceded by: Osvaldo Cacciatore
- Succeeded by: Julio César Saguier

Personal details
- Born: 19 July 1930 Buenos Aires, Argentina
- Died: 29 October 2004 (aged 74) Buenos Aires, Argentina
- Party: Popular Line Movement
- Education: University of Buenos Aires

Guillermo Jorge del Cioppo (19 July 1930 – 29 October 2004) was an Argentine politician who served as intendente (mayor) of Buenos Aires from 1983 to 1983, appointed by the military dictatorship that ruled the country at the time.

== Early life and career ==
Del Cioppo was born on 19 July 1930 in Buenos Aires. In his youth, he married María Marta Arce, with whom he had three children. He completed his secondary education at the Colegio Nacional de Buenos Aires before earning a law degree from the University of Buenos Aires (UBA) Faculty of Law.

Between 1956 and 1957, he served as an advisor at Argentina's Ministry of the Interior. His political trajectory advanced in 1970 when he was appointed Chief of Staff for the Advisory Cabinet during Brigadier Aguirre's municipal administration. By 1975, he had joined the Promotional Committee of the Movimiento Línea Popular, a political organization aligned with the Peronist movement led by Francisco Manrique.

During the mayoralty of Osvaldo Cacciatore (1976–1982), del Cioppo chaired the Municipal Housing Commission, the agency responsible for overseeing the controversial removal of informal settlements (villas de emergencia) in Buenos Aires. This period coincided with Argentina's last military dictatorship, during which urban policy became increasingly exclusionary.

== Mayor of Buenos Aires ==
On 31 March 1982, President Leopoldo Fortunato Galtieri appointed him intendente (mayor) of Buenos Aires. His administration became known for its exclusionary rhetoric, particularly his declaration that "one must deserve to live in Buenos Aires" – a statement made following mass protests against the military government that had removed his predecessor.

During his brief tenure, he implemented several urban changes: the redesignation of Plaza España as Parque España (officially recorded as covering 5.51 hectares), renovations in Parque Tres de Febrero, and the inauguration of the Psychiatric Emergency Center at Alvear Hospital. President Reynaldo Bignone reconfirmed his appointment on 21 July 1982.

A significant infrastructure achievement was the 1 May 1983 opening of the Retiro Bus Terminal, which consolidated Buenos Aires' previously decentralized intercity bus operations near Plaza Constitución and Plaza Once into a single modern facility. His term ended on 10 December 1983 with Argentina's return to democracy.

== Later life and death ==
In his post-mayoral years, he presided over the Organización Sarmiento and joined the Argentine Society of Writers. From 1997 to 2002, he led the neighborhood association Amigos de la Ciudad. He died on 29 October 2004 and was interred at La Chacarita Cemetery.

Political offices
Preceded by Osvaldo Cacciatore	Mayor of Buenos Aires; 1982–1983	Succeeded by Julio César Saguier
