= Golf Club José Jurado =

The Golf Club José Jurado is a public golf course in Villa Lugano, a southern neighborhood in Buenos Aires, Argentina. It was named after José Jurado, considered the “Father of Argentine Professional Golf”. It is an 18-hole, par 72 course (35+35) with three different rounds: "Blue" for championships with a total of 6706 yards, senior men and ladies, with 6428 yards each.
