= Julio César Saguier =

Argentine lawyer and politician

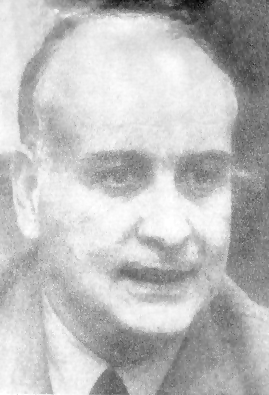

64 Mayor of Buenos Aires
- In office December 10, 1983 – January 13, 1987
- President: Raúl Alfonsín
- Preceded by: Guillermo del Cioppo
- Succeeded by: Facundo Suárez Lastra

Personal details
- Born: July 18, 1935 Buenos Aires, Argentina
- Died: January 13, 1987 (aged 51) Buenos Aires, Argentina
- Party: Radical Civic Union
- Education: University of Buenos Aires
- Profession: Lawyer

Julio César Saguier (June 18, 1935 – January 13, 1987) was an Argentine lawyer and politician.
