= EGames (esports) =

2016 event in Rio de Janeiro, Brazil

eGames

Tournament information
- Sport: Esports
- Location: Worldwide
- Dates: 15 August 2016–
- Established: 6 April 2016
- Format: TBA
- Teams: eTeams
- Website: www.egames.org

Current champion
- Canada (Super Smash Bros. for Wii U)

EGAMES is an international esports (competitive video gaming) competition based on national teams. The first EGAMES showcase event took place during the 2016 Summer Olympics in Rio de Janeiro, Brazil at the British House in Parque Lage, Jardim Botânico on 15–16 August. The games were Smite as a show match and Super Smash Bros. for Wii U as a competition.

The EGAMES is a fully independent organisation and has no association with the International Olympic Committee (IOC) or Olympic Games.

The inaugural EGAMES tournament for the 2026/27 academic year features three core game titles, offering competitive opportunities for both male and female K–12 student players across different disciplines:

* Rocket League: A high-energy, 3v3 school team competition.

* EA SPORTS FC (EAFC27): Individual competitive routes, including a dedicated pathway for female players.

* Minecraft: A collaborative school-wide creative build challenge.

== Editions ==
=== eGames ===
- eGames Rio 2016 (Rio de Janeiro, Brazil) (showcase)

==== 2016 showcase ====
In the eGames Rio de Janeiro Showcase 2016, 8 eTeams participated in the eGames.

- Argentina (Super Smash Bros. for Wii U)
- Brazil (host) (Smite and Super Smash Bros. for Wii U)
- (United Kingdom) Great Britain (Super Smash Bros. for Wii U)
- Canada (Super Smash Bros. for Wii U)
- Germany (Super Smash Bros. for Wii U)
- Mexico (Super Smash Bros. for Wii U)
- Trinidad and Tobago (Super Smash Bros. for Wii U)
- United States (Super Smash Bros. for Wii U)

===== Results =====
Place	Player	Character(s)
1st place, gold medalist(s)	(Canada) Ally	Mario
2nd place, silver medalist(s)	(United States) Larry Lurr	Fox
3rd place, bronze medalist(s)	(Mexico) MKLeo	Marth, Cloud
4	(United Kingdom) J.Miller	Luigi
5	(Germany) Sodrek	Fox
5	(Trinidad and Tobago) Wabz	Sonic
7	(Brazil) Player 7	Mario
7	(Argentina) Gado	Rosalina and Luma, Peach

== See also ==
- World Cyber Games, similar competition that mirrored the Olympics
