= Osvaldo Cacciatore =

Former Argentine Air Force brigadier and Mayor of Buenos Aires

Osvaldo Andrés Cacciatore
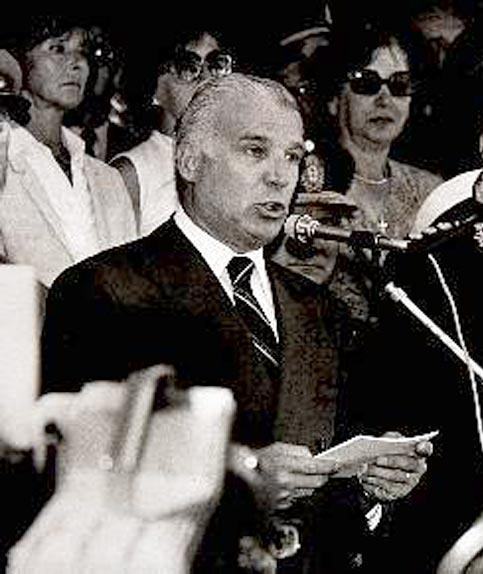
- Cacciatore in 1982.

62 Mayor of Buenos Aires
- In office April 2, 1976 – March 31, 1982
- President: Jorge Rafael Videla, Roberto Eduardo Viola, Leopoldo Galtieri
- Preceded by: Eduardo Crespi
- Succeeded by: Guillermo del Cioppo

Personal details
- Born: 1924 Buenos Aires, Argentina
- Died: July 28, 2007 (aged 83) Buenos Aires, Argentina
- Party: Union of the Democratic Centre
- Education: School of Military Aviation
- Profession: Military officer

Military service
- Allegiance: Argentina
- Branch/service: Argentine Air Force
- Years of service: 1946–1973
- Rank: Brigadier

Osvaldo Andrés Cacciatore (1924–2007) was an Argentine Air Force brigadier and Mayor of Buenos Aires during the National Reorganization Process military dictatorship.

His management at the head of the city of Buenos Aires was controversial for the works he carried out and for those that would only remain as proposals. Cacciatore always defended his work, which changed a good part of the design of the capital. The highway plan was its emblem.

== Early life ==
Osvaldo Cacciatore was born in Buenos Aires in 1924. He enrolled at the School of Military Aviation in 1946 and on September 28, 1951, joined an attempted coup d'état against President Juan Perón. The putsch, led by retired General Benjamín Menéndez, was a bid to thwart the upcoming 1951 general elections (in which Perón was re-elected). It quickly failed, however, and Menéndez, Cacciatore and a number of others escaped to neighboring Montevideo, Uruguay, whose government was at odds with Perón's. Cacciatore, a first lieutenant at the time, was discharged on October 1, 1951, by means of Decree 19525.

Cacciatore returned to Argentina and was reinstated into the Air Force. Following a collapse in Church-state relations in Argentina in late 1954, Cacciatore joined a second mutiny against the President, led by Rear Admiral Samuel Toranzo Calderón. On the eve of the planned, June 16, 1955, attack, Toranzo had decided to postpone the move; but unaware of the decision, an Air Force detachment, which included Cacciatore, carried out the brutal bombing of Plaza de Mayo (the public square facing the presidential offices, the Casa Rosada) as scheduled, and during a Peronist rally. Piloting one of the Gloster Meteor jets deployed for the raid, Cacciatore was among the pilots whose attack took over 300 civilian lives, after which the pilots flew to safety in Uruguay.

An Army revolt led by General Eduardo Lonardi in September 1955 ultimately succeeded in deposing Perón, and following the September 23 installation of the Revolución Libertadora regime, Cacciatore returned. An uneventful career in subsequent years was capped by his appointment in 1972 as Acting Head of the Joint Chiefs of Staff by President Alejandro Lanusse, whose military regime was in its final days. Elections called by Lanusse for March 1973, would include, for the first time since Perón's ouster, a lifting of the ban on Peronism, and Cacciatore chaired the government delegation to negotiate terms for Perón's preliminary November 17, 1972, Argentine visit.

The return of Peronism to power in 1973 exacerbated political frictions in Argentina, however, and was ultimately followed by a March 1976 coup and the installation of the National Reorganization Process, the last Argentine dictatorship. Replacing nearly all elected officials, the new regime named Cacciatore to the post of Mayor of Buenos Aires, whose economy is nearly a fourth of the nation's total.

== Mayor of Buenos Aires ==
The planned network of freeways approved by Cacciatore in 1976 - five were ultimately built.

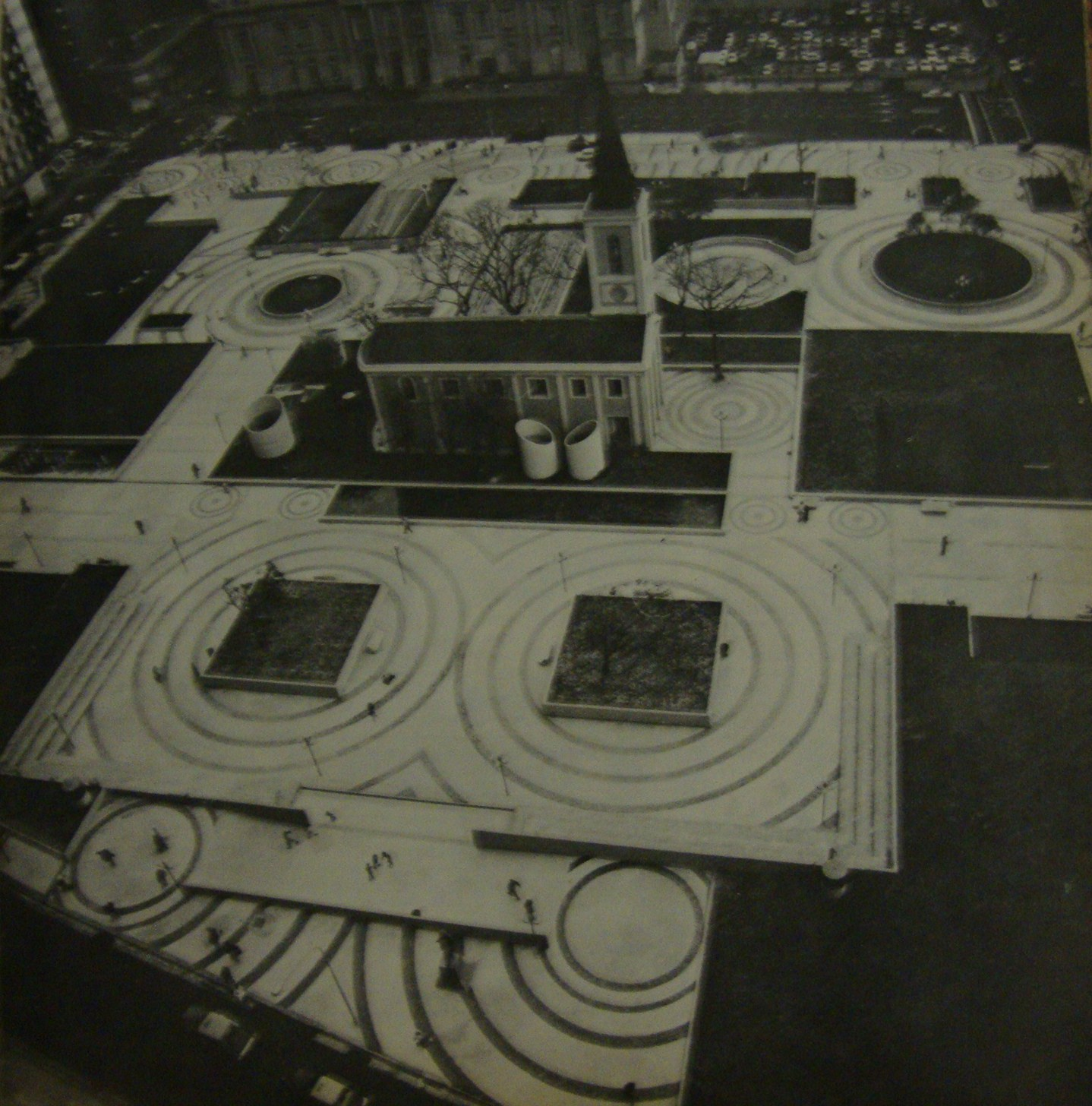
Plaza Houssay, along Córdoba Avenue, was one of numerous such public squares developed or remodeled during Cacciatore's tenure.

At the helm of what was then still South America's largest city, Cacciatore inherited an agenda topped by wave of political violence and concerns over readiness for the 1978 FIFA World Cup, for which two football stadia in the Buenos Aires (José Amalfitani Stadium and River Plate) were to be made available as part of the schedule of matches. The city, however, suffered from a number of serious logistical problems, as well: the rapid growth in automobile traffic since the 1950s, which by 1976 totaled 1.5 million vehicles daily, had not been met by appropriate infrastructure improvements, and the unrelenting flow of migrants from both the less developed Argentine north and neighboring countries such as Bolivia and Paraguay had resulted in the formation of over 30 villas miseria (shantytowns, with varying levels of squalor, illegally built on empty lots); these latter were, by 1976, believed to be home to around 200,000 people (6% of the city's population).

The mayor moved quickly, and appointed a local civil engineer, Dr. Guillermo Laura, to design a new city transport master plan. Dr. Laura's ambitious project, originally published in 1970, called for the eventual construction of a network of nine city freeways (two were already in use), which would total 74 km (46 mi). Preparation for the plan resulted in the expropriation and demolition of over 3,000 homes during 1977–78, and construction on the first two freeways began in November 1978. Totaling 14 km (9 mi) and opened in December 1980, they were granted to the Spanish-Argentine AUSA consortium as toll roads with a concession until 2006.

Slum clearance was addressed with the mayor's July 13, 1977, ordinance, which mandated the eradication of all shantytowns, as well as of public housing for around 16,000 people, whose inhabitants would be relocated to the Greater Buenos Aires area (mainly La Matanza and Esteban Echeverría Counties, west of the city). Following a census of these communities and a spate of restrictions, such as those on new edifications, on the dwellings' sale, and on cottage industry therein, the Department of Internal Vigilance began their demolition; as many slum inhabitants were unwilling to relocate, these were often violent and resulted in numerous injuries and deaths.

These incidents and the Housing Commission's own stipulation that slum clearance could only legally occur after suitable housing had been arranged for those affected helped result in a December 1979 injunction against further removals by a court of appeals, curbing the worst abuses. The 1980 Census revealed that the city's slums were home to no more than 30,000 people, prompting Cacciatore's Housing Commissioner (and successor as mayor), Guillermo del Cioppo, to declare that living in Buenos Aires is not for just anyone, but for those who deserve it and are willing to accept life in a proper community - a better city for the best people.

These controversial accomplishments were complemented by the opening 64 public schools and of numerous public parks, as well as by the successful World Cup event (won by Argentina) and the closure of the city's tens of thousands of apartment building incinerators, whose noxious disposal of the city's 3,000 daily tons of refuse was replaced by curbside pickup service operated by Manliba, a consortium between Waste Management, Inc. and local businessman Francisco Macri.

Cacciatore's dynamic record was clouded, however, by the dictatorship's own Dirty War against dissidents and its resulting 30,000 deaths and disappearances (most of which were known by the regime to be non-violent dissidents, and for which 15 detention centers were opened in Buenos Aires, alone), and by financial irregularities in the mayor's many projects, themselves. The two completed freeways, budgeted at US$222 million, cost nearly a billion dollars, and their less-than-projected use by toll-paying motorists helped lead to the suspension of work on the other five in 1981; one planned freeway was cancelled only after the demolition of a several block-long swath in a residential area, and its effects on the residential Saavedra neighborhood were only remedied in the late 1990s (three other freeways were ultimately completed).

Cacciatore's deal with Manliba also came under fire for its cost and for the consortium's failure to adequately maintain new landfills. His decision to force San Lorenzo de Almagro, a major local football team, to sell their Boedo-area stadium and the land's subsequent US$8 million resale to French retailer Carrefour has likewise never been clarified. His efforts to redevelop the dilapidated Villa Soldati section of the city led to the construction of the Parque de la Ciudad after 1977 on what had been a landfill, though the bankruptcy of the developer, Interama, in 1980 led to controversy when Cacciatore had the city absorb the group's debts; in the end, the amusement park's planned 15 million yearly visitors never came (attendance rarely topped 1 million).

== Later life ==
Cacciatore was forced to waylay a number of other urban renewal projects (notably an ambitious plan to urbanize Puerto Madero, then derelict docklands) by an economic crisis triggered in part by Economy Minister José Alfredo Martínez de Hoz's wholesale deregulation of finance. The mayor handed over reins of the city to Housing Commissioner Guillermo del Cioppo on April 1, 1982, and the latter served as caretaker until elections in late 1983. Cacciatore became a partner in Juncadella, an armored transport firm, and was a defendant in numerous lawsuits stemming from the lucrative deals he sponsored as mayor.

Following the return of democracy in 1983, many of the slum-dwellers expelled by Cacciatore returned. This in part prompted him to enter politics as a candidate for Congress on the conservative UCeDé ticket in 1993 and for a seat in the Buenos Aires City Legislature in 1997, though he was unsuccessful both times. He died in Buenos Aires on July 28, 2007, at age 83.

Preceded by Eduardo Crespi	Mayor of Buenos Aires; 1976–1982	Succeeded by Guillermo del Cioppo
