= Parque de la Ciudad =

Theme park located in Buenos Aires, Argentina

Coordinates: 34°40′18.3″S 58°27′3.9″W

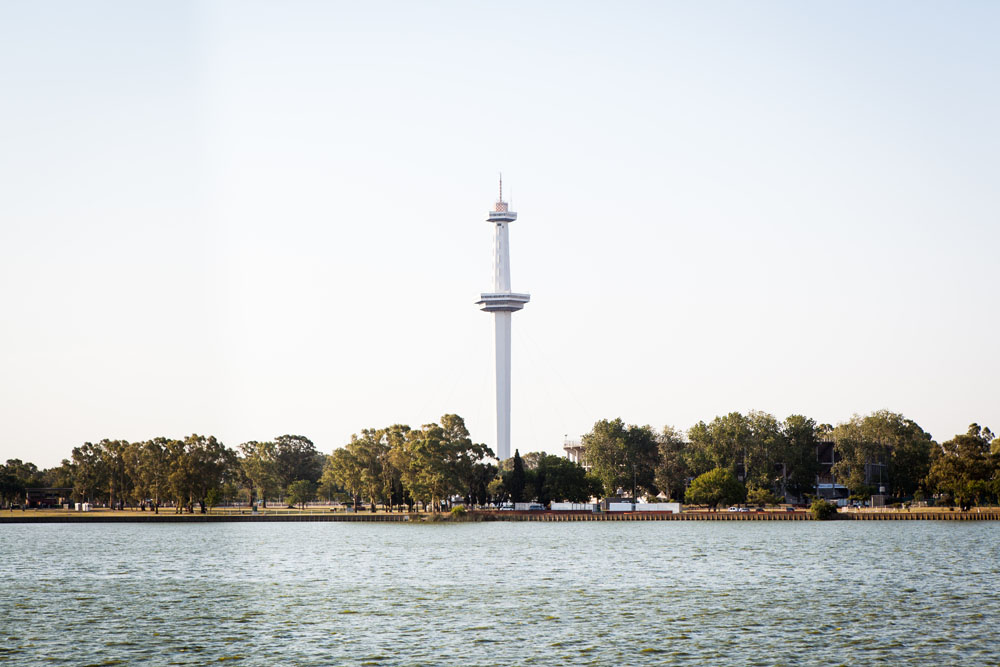
- Established: September 21, 1982
- Location: Argentina, Villa Soldati, Buenos Aires
- Visitors: 985,000 annually (2003)
- Website: municipal website

The Parque de la Ciudad (English: City Park) is a public park and former amusement park in the Villa Soldati neighborhood of Buenos Aires, Argentina.

== History ==
The park was planned by the administration of Mayor Osvaldo Cacciatore in 1978. Cacciatore, appointed by Argentina's last military government, envisaged the park as the centerpiece of efforts to revitalize the dilapidated Villa Soldati ward. The mayor opened the contract to develop a theme park for bidding, and awarded the bid to Interama Parks S.A., a company established for the purpose; Alberto Gourdy Allende was chosen as its first managing director.

Interama Parks was formed for use of the military that governed Argentina at that time, but also for civilian use. The company contracted the Swiss firm Intamin to supply imported attractions, including mechanical games, roller coasters, facilities, accessories, shopping trolleys, popcorn machines, and the Interama Tower, an observation tower. The amusement area itself is a relatively small facet of the park, which included 75 hectares (188 acres) of green space.

=== Construction ===
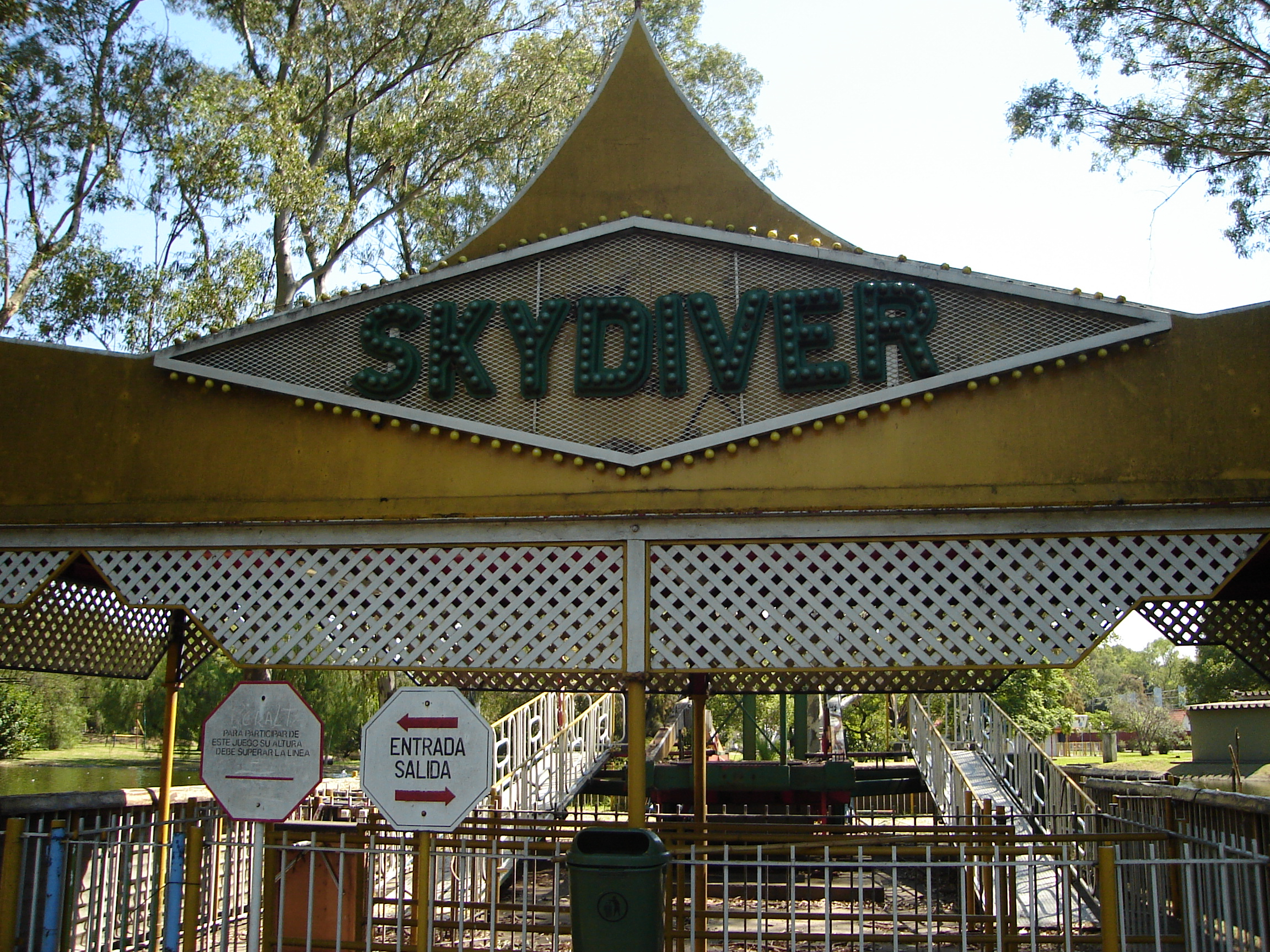
Gates to the former Skydiver ride.

Construction began at the end of 1978, planned on a 120-hectare (296 acres) empty lot near the Parque Zoofitogeografico (an arboretum), in Villa Soldati. It lay between the Belgrano South railway and parking lots (for Fernández de la Cruz station), and would be adjacent to an existing public park. The construction required eviction of some slum residents, as well as several small landowners’ properties; some roads required resurfacing/new pavement to allow construction machinery access to the site.

After the removal of debris and waste, the property was first used as a landfill. A perimeter fence was placed around the site, and work began. One million cubic meters of earth had to be moved to level the site, with the landfill serving as an initial foundation. This displaced soil was then repurposed in features such as lakes, hills, and valleys, as well as for the rides’ foundations and the park's roadways. Workers began assembling a replica of the Russian mountains. The site was being transformed from a once-fallow field into a colourful theme park.

Special recreation zones (plones) were laid out. James Fowler, a leading geologist, was contracted, as was Richard Battaglia of Walt Disney World. The construction was carried out by an engineering team led by Omar N. Vázquez.

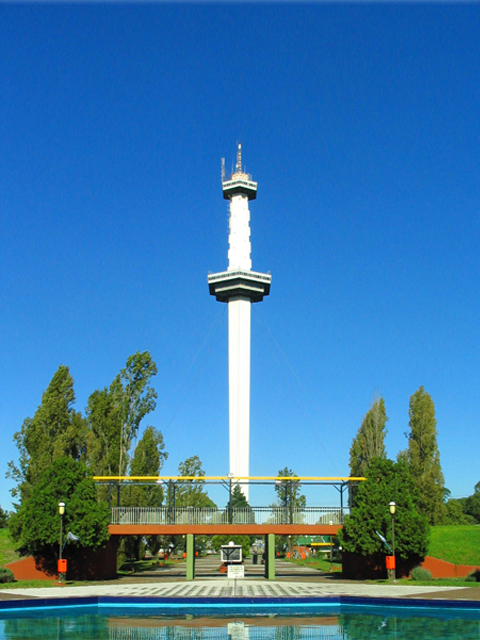
The Torre Espacial observation tower.

Described as a "circular tower, with observatory and restaurant..." (according to a November 1978 issue of Gente magazine), work began on La Torre Espacial in May 1980; materials for the observation tower were acquired in Austria, shortly after Interama won the bid.

The first step of the production was to create the holes for the foundation pilings. The piles were created by TREVI, INC. at a cost of US$728,000.

Trevi constructed the extensive pilings for the foundations of the following structures:

- Vertigorama Roller Coaster (US$2,025,000) - Total Ride Cost: US $10,000,000
- Aerogondolas (Sky Ride) Columns (US$78,000) - Total Ride Cost: US $4,500,000
- Aconcagua Roller Coaster (US$67,000) - Total Ride Cost: US $6,500,000
- Pedestrian entry bridge via Fernández de la Cruz Avenue (US$16,000)

Metal reinforcements for concrete were placed into the 35 meter (115 foot) deep holes, and these were filled with bentonite, a clay-like mineral, to absorb groundwater. The bentonite was then displaced by the poured concrete. Approximately 10 metres (33 feet) below the piles, the ground was composed of puelchense, a layer of very hard material unique to the topography of Buenos Aires.

30 pilings were cut off (with the metallic armor visible) to 8 metres (26 feet) below ground level. This area was then filled by solid concrete, in which the main columns of the Observation Tower were embedded. This process alone took six months. Construction of the metallic structure took a further six months.

While the tower was under construction, preparations were being made for the anchoring of the tensors, which would have to be lowered to a depth of 120 metres (394 feet). The tower itself was a self-supporting structure, and did not need external supports, until reaching 120 metres. The tensor cables were attached via crane to the important beams under Platform 1, and the concrete anchorages at the base of the tower.

The incomplete structure became an improvised, gigantic Christmas tree for the 1980 holiday season. At night, thousands of coloured lights were illuminated along the steel tensors, with a giant star on the roof of platform 2; a poster, on one side of platform 1, could be read from a distance, displaying “FE”.

=== The park since its opening ===
The park was inaugurated as Parque Interama on September 21, 1982. Its sixty attractions included the Aconcagua roller coaster, the Scorpion double giant wheel, Vertigorama double roller coaster (which never opened as not all parts were delivered), Aerogondolas (the longest Sky Ride in Latin America), the musical fountain, and a miniature railway circulating around the perimeter of the park. The observation tower reached 208 m (682 ft) upon topping out in 1981, and remained the tallest free-standing structure in Argentina until 2015.

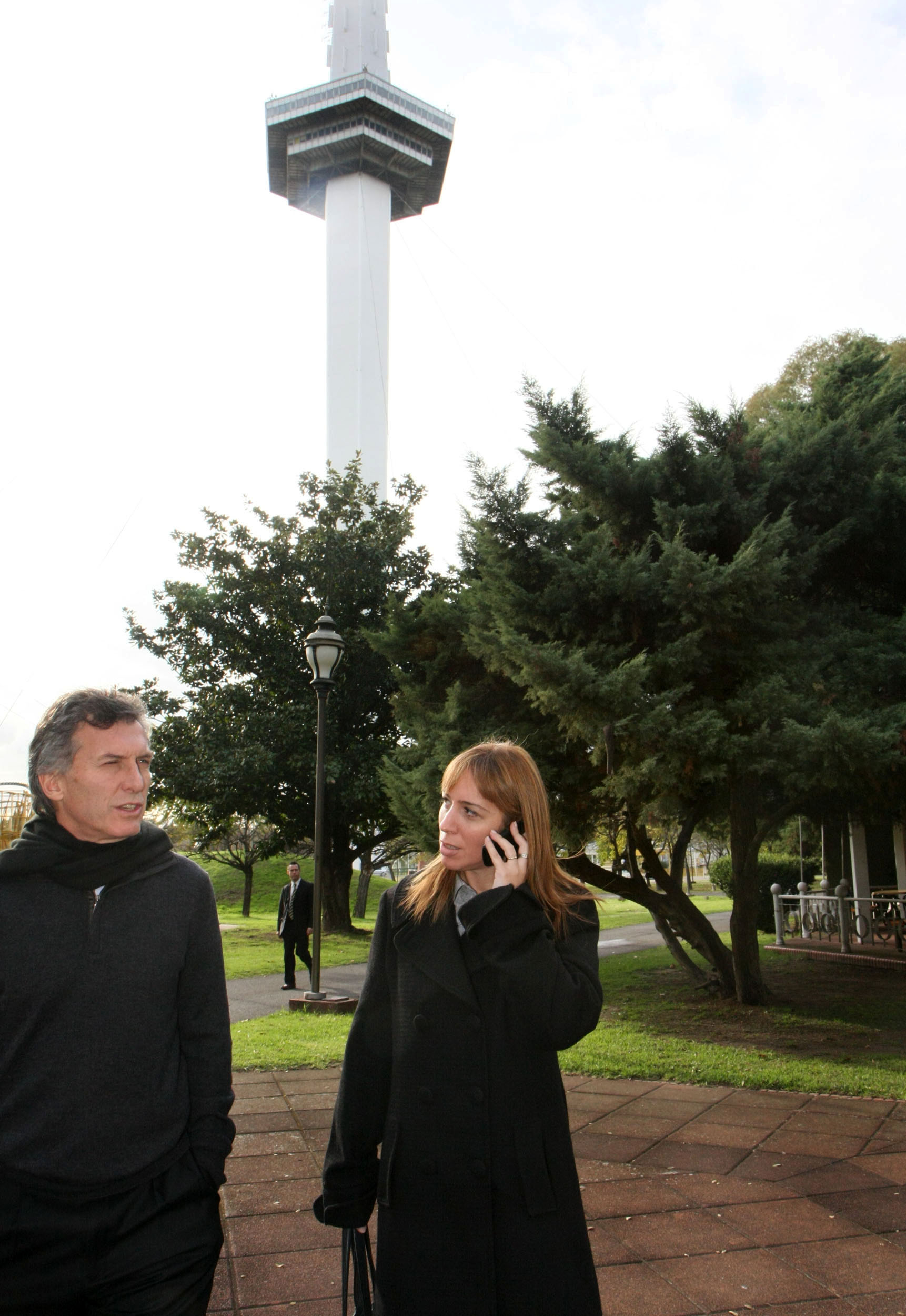
Mayor Mauricio Macri and Vice-Mayor María Eugenia Vidal tour the park after its partial reopening in 2010.

The park struggled with setbacks from before its opening, The 1980 bankruptcy of the chief stockholder in Interama, Banco Sidesa, delayed the inaugural. Interama's estimated US$100 million in bad debts prompted the administration of Mayor Julio César Saguier to revoke the lease, and sue Interama, upon the 1983 return of democracy. The park was then renamed as the Parque de la Ciudad (City Park) in December of that year.

The park itself failed to attract the 15 million yearly visitors projected by the city. Annual attendance reached 1.1 million in 1985, and declined afterward. The addition of an IMAX cinema was later planned, but was ultimately canceled. The park's deteriorating condition led to its closure by Mayor Aníbal Ibarra in October 2003, and though it was reopened three years later, ongoing safety concerns led to its renewed closure in March 2008 by Mayor Mauricio Macri. Years of litigation culminated in November 2000 in a US$2 billion ruling in favor of Interama and against the city for a breach of contract stemming from the 1983 lease rescission. Appeals filed by the city ultimately resulted in the ruling's reversal in 2007, however.

The park was reopened for the nation's Bicentennial in May 2010; amid ongoing refurbishment and replacement of inoperable rides, the reopening included the addition of a cultural center and art gallery. Mayor Macri later established the 180,000 m^{2} (1.9 million ft^{2}) Ciudad del Rock (Rock City) on the grounds of the former amusement park in 2013; the venue was built to host events organized by Quilmes Rock estimated to draw over 50,000 spectators. The project drew criticism from Villa Lugano-area Congressman Alejandro Bodart, who pointed to Macri's decision to collect below-market user fees from Quilmes Rock (180,000 pesos - US$31,000 - per event) as well as the mayor's plan to dismantle the park's abandoned rides.

The defunct amusement park was chosen by city authorities to serve as the main location for the 2018 Summer Youth Olympics. The bidding process was thus announced on March 27, 2014, for the construction an olympic village with 1,440 apartments to house athletes and staff, as well as numerous venues for the games themselves, including the Predio Ferial Olímpico. Afterwards, the apartments were dismantled and moved to be used for social housing.

By 2019, the site became an open green space with diverse flora and fauna. It is used as a general outdoor area by the general public and also by organizations who host concerts and art exhibitions. Although most of the rides have been removed, Torre Espacial and Vertigorama are still standing. It is served by the Premetro through its Parque de la Ciudad station and by the Metrobus Sur MBT line.

== See also ==
- Italpark
