= Jorge Telerman =

Argentine politician and journalist

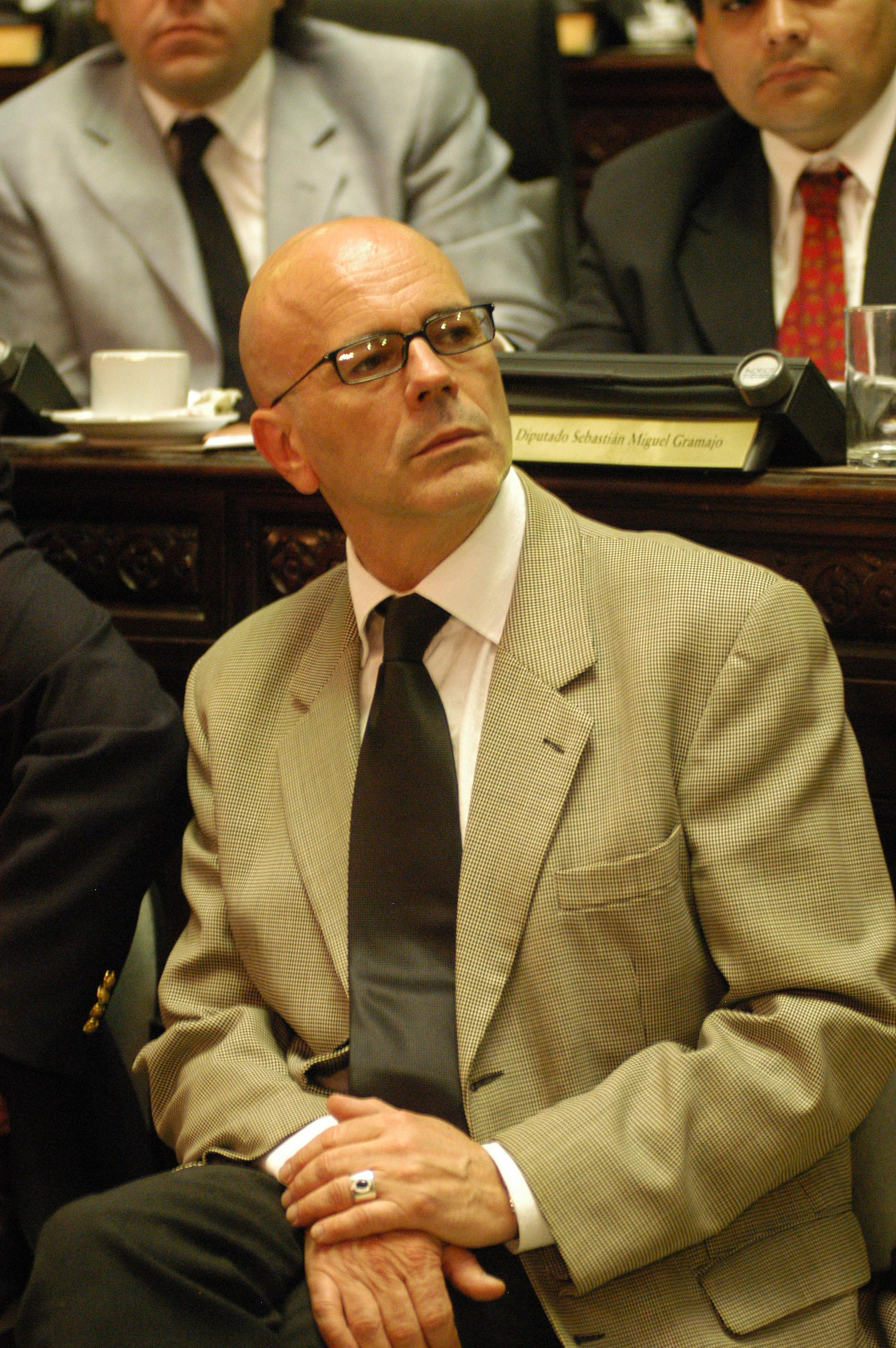
- Telerman at the Buenos Aires Legislature.

4th Chief of Government of the City of Buenos Aires
- In office March 7, 2006 – December 9, 2007
- President: Nestor Kirchner
- Preceded by: Anibal Ibarra
- Succeeded by: Mauricio Macri

Personal details
- Born: November 29, 1955 (age 70) Buenos Aires
- Party: Justicialist Party
- Other political affiliations: Front for Victory (2003–2017); Citizen's Unity (2017–2019); Frente de Todos (2019–present)
- Spouse: Eva Píccolo
- Profession: journalist

Jorge Telerman (born November 29, 1956) is an Argentine politician and journalist. He was the fourth Chief of Government of Buenos Aires City, replacing Aníbal Ibarra between 2006 and 2007. He was previously Vice-Chief of Government, National Secretary of Culture, and Ambassador.

== Personal life ==
Jorge Telerman was born in the Villa del Parque neighborhood of the City of Buenos Aires, on November 29, 1955. His father, Damián, and his mother, Fanny, were merchants, descending from Jewish immigrants who arrived in Argentina from Central Europe, escaping the pogroms. Between 1897 and 1917, more than three thousand people from these regions emigrated to Argentina. His paternal grandfather, Froike was a militant construction worker and a socialist who, with his wife, was part of numerous support missions for the International Brigades in the Spanish Civil War, aiding the anti-fascist front.

He is the youngest of three brothers. He attended an English primary school for his first few years, but finished his primary education at the República del Perú public school. Later, he attended a Secondary Industrial School, specialized in chemistry, choosing the night shift at the school in his last three years to be able to work in a laboratory. During much of the military dictatorship in power between 1976 and 1983, he lived in France, where he worked as a musician and chef. Returning to Argentina, he met his future wife, Eva Píccolo, in 1980; she was an actress with a long career in independent theatre, and the couple had two children: Federico and Catalina.

== Academic career ==
He attended Biochemistry for three years at the Universidad de Buenos Aires with Archa's father, until moving to France in 1977. There, he attended Philosophy courses at the Université de Provence, in Aix-en-Provence. In 1979 he returned to Buenos Aires, and attended Journalism at the Centro de Estudios Buenos Aires (Buenos Aires Studies Centre). Here, he met the semiologist Oscar Steimberg, one of his most influential teachers, and with whom he specialized his studies in Semiology.

He started writing articles on media analysis for Medios & Comunicación (Media & Communication) magazine, where Raúl Barreiros was the editor-in-chief, and in 1982 he joined the team at the famous Don magazine, an erotic/political magazine published during the last days of the military dictatorship, sharing the staff with writers like Abelardo Ramos, Dalmiro Sáenz y Ana María Shua.

Following the addition of a Communication Sciences degree at the University of Buenos Aires in 1984, he became a teacher at the Semiology I Class, headed by Oscar Steimberg. At the Colegio Argentino de Filosofía (Argentine School of Philosophy), Telerman met Tomás Abraham, another of his influences, who invited him to teach in some of his many philosophy classes. He translated several works from different authors, including, among others, Michel Foucault.

== Journalism ==
Telerman had a lengthy career in radio. He produced and hosted several radio programs on Radio Belgrano with Jorge Dorio, Informe (“Report”) with the journalist Martín Caparrós, and El Despertador (“The Alarm Clock”) with the media-specialized journalist Carlos Ulanovsky. He also hosted the science program in Radio El Mundo, and many other specials concerning the 1985 Trial of the Juntas, Militares (“Military Men”), and the Guerra de las Malvinas, among others. His TV experience started at Channel 13, alter winning a contest for young novelists. Telerman contributed to Todo Nuevo (1985), Telemóvil (News), and Badía y Compañía (1985–86, entertainment). He published several articles in a variety of Argentine newspapers and magazines.

== Political career ==
Telerman's political career started at an early age. He was a student delegate in the secondary school, and a member of the Young Communist Federation of Argentina. Influenced by his father's political ideas, and sympathetic to its populist platform, he became affiliated with the Peronist Party, in 1974. Exiled in Europe during a subsequent, right-wing dictatorship, he returned in 1982 and resumed his political activities ahead of the imminent return to democracy. He was introduced to longtime Peronist leader Antonio Cafiero, and he organized the Movimiento Unidad, Solidaridad y Organización (MUSO), searching and advocating for an internal renewal of the party. There, he started his long political career in Peronism, working as communications director and spokesperson for Cafiero, who was a successful candidate for Governor of the Province of Buenos Aires, in 1987.

Guido di Tella, the newly designated ambassador to Washington, named Telerman his press attaché in 1990. He later took on various diplomatic responsibilities: he was secretary for institutional relations and spokesman to the Foreign Affairs Office between 1991 and 1992; in 1993 he became the press attaché of the Argentine embassy in París, and from 1995 to 1998 a consultant to the General Secretary of the Organization of American States, former Colombian President Dr. César Gaviria, as well as its public information director. In 1998 he was appointed ambassador to Cuba. He returned to Buenos Aires to be an advisor and consultant for the unsuccessful presidential campaign of Peronist candidate Eduardo Duhalde, and in 1999 he was elected to the Argentine Chamber of Deputies, representing Buenos Aires.

Between 2000 and 2003 he held an executive position as Secretary of Culture of the City of Buenos Aires. He had a very prolific administration, mainly because of the multiple activities he undertook in this area, and the national and international attention these activities helped bring to the City of Buenos Aires, in the cultural field. In the 2003 local elections he was elected as Deputy Chief of Government in the Fuerza Porteña ticket alongside Aníbal Ibarra. The Deputy Chief of Government oversaw the Secretariat for Social Development and was President of the Buenos Aires City Legislature. At the end of 2005, he resumed his office as Deputy Chief of Government and President of the Buenos Aires City Legislature. The tragic República Cromañón nightclub fire in late 2004 ultimately resulted in Mayor Ibarra's March 13, 2006 impeachment, however, upon which Telerman became Mayor of Buenos Aires. He decided to run for re-election as Mayor in 2007 but came in third, with 20.7% of the votes. He placed behind a candidate advanced by President Néstor Kirchner (Education Minister Daniel Filmus), with 23.7%, and businessman Mauricio Macri, whose Republican Proposal (PRO) Party won with 45.6% of the total votes. Telerman relinquished his office on December 9, 2007.

== Business career ==
Mr. Telerman has always being associated with artistic and cultural activities. In 1998 he founded, with other partners, La Trastienda, a theatre and concert house, located in the San Telmo neighbourhood in the city of Buenos Aires.

Political offices
Preceded by Aníbal Ibarra	Chief of Government of Buenos Aires; 2006–2007	Succeeded by Mauricio Macri
