= Villa Soldati =

Coordinates: 34°40′S 58°27′W

- Neighborhood of Buenos Aires
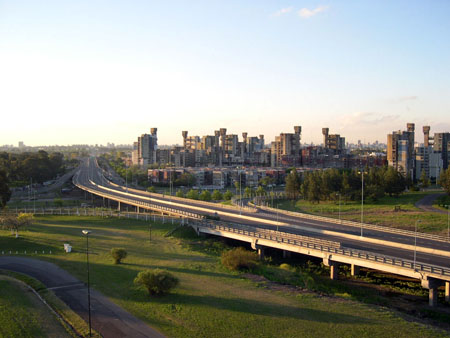
- The Cámpora Freeway and the Soldati housing complex

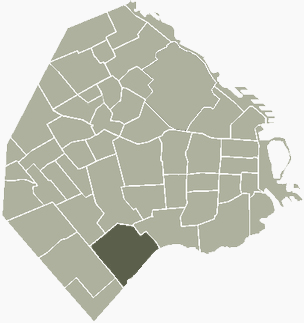
- Location of Villa Soldati within Buenos Aires
- Country: Argentina
- Autonomous City: Buenos Aires
- Comuna: C8
- Important sites: Parque de la Ciudad; Parque Roca Stadium

Area
  - Total: 8.7 km^{2} (3.4 sq mi)

Population (2001)
  - Total: 41,228
  - Density: 4,700/km^{2} (12,000/sq mi)
- Time zone: UTC-3 (ART)

Villa Soldati is a neighbourhood in Buenos Aires, Argentina, located in the South-West of the city. It has a population of approximately 41,000 people, 40% of which live in Barrio Soldati, a public housing development built between 1973 and 1979.

The ward is delimited by 27 de Febrero Ave., Coronel Esteban Bonorino, General Francisco Fernández de la Cruz Ave., Varela, Perito Moreno Ave., Castañares, and Escalada streets.

Founded in 1908 by Dr. José Soldati as "Villa Lugano," the area originally included what today is the Villa Lugano neighborhood. The first lots were sold in 1911, but the area's topography led to frequent flooding, and much of the area was left undeveloped. The neighborhood was bolstered by the establishment of the large La Vascongada dairy in 1930, but the opening of a landfill in 1936 dampened hopes for the area's future growth. Villa Soldati was formally demarcated as such in 1972.

On the morning of June 11, 1962, a train struck a bus on a level crossing in Villa Soldati, killing 43 people, mostly children

The area saw dramatic changes during the tenure of military-appointed Mayor Osvaldo Cacciatore, when he attempted to revitalize the ward (the city's poorest) with the construction of the Parque de la Ciudad, an amusement park. Built after 1977 over the former landfill, the bankruptcy of the developer (Interama) in 1980 led to controversy when Cacciatore had the city absorb the group's debts of over US$100 million; in the end, the amusement park's planned 15 million yearly visitors never came (attendance has never topped 1 million).

The Parque Roca Stadium, a multi-purpose facility, opened in Villa Soldati in 2006, became the home of the Argentina Davis Cup Team, and hosted a semifinal match of the 2006 Davis Cup as its first sporting event.

Villa Soldati
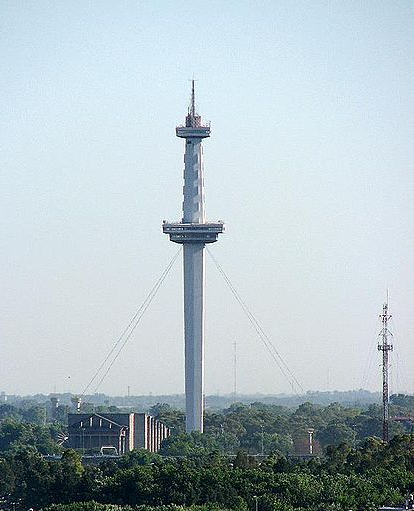
The amusement park space tower
