= Gymnastics at the 2018 Summer Youth Olympics – Girls' floor exercise =

Women's floor exercise at the III Summer Youth Olympic Games
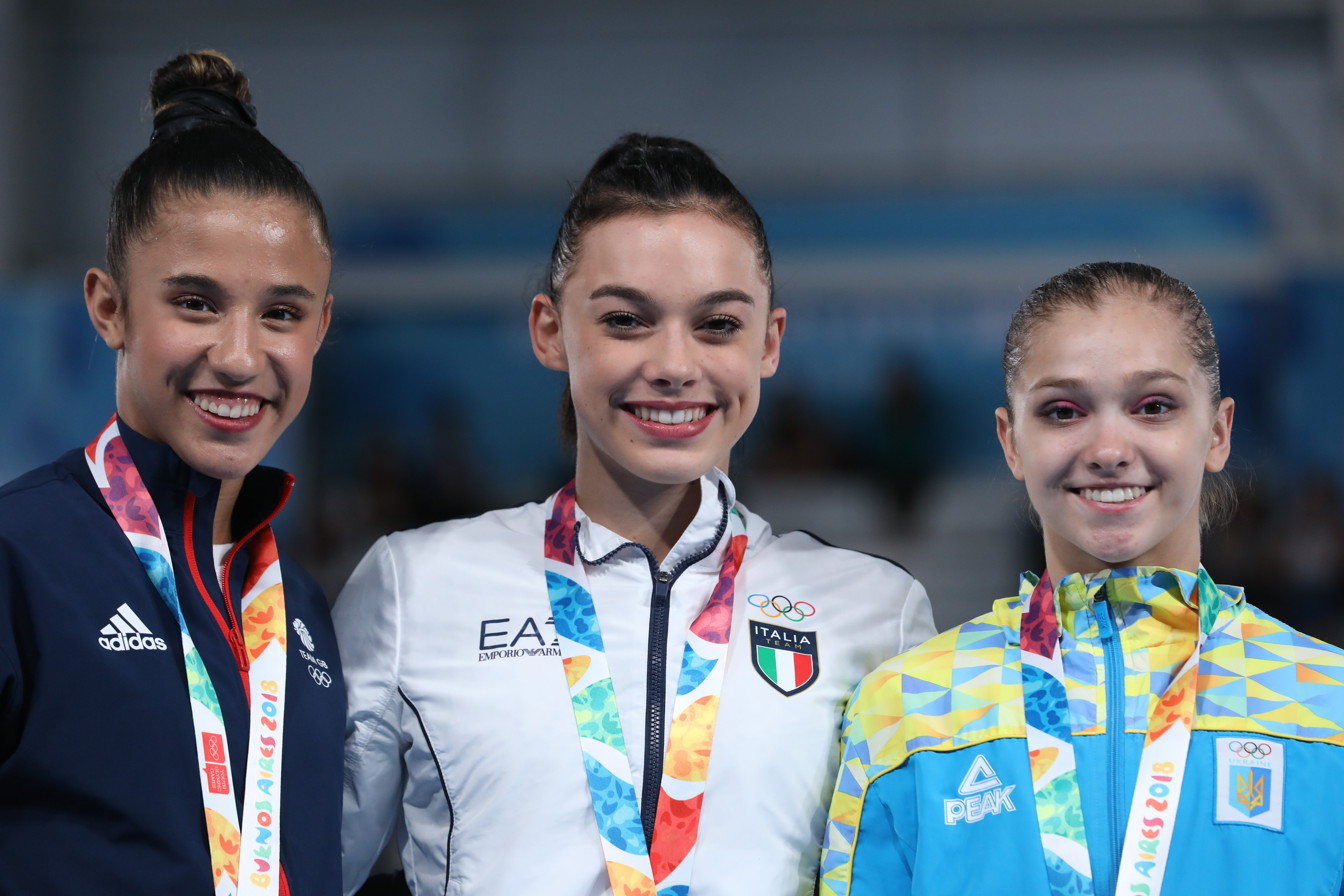
- Medalists Morgan (left), Villa (center), and Bachynska (right)
- Venue: America Pavilion
- Date: 15 October
- Competitors: 8 from 8 nations
- Winning score: 13.300

Medalists
1st place, gold medalist(s)		Giorgia Villa	Italy
2nd place, silver medalist(s)		Amelie Morgan	Great Britain
3rd place, bronze medalist(s)		Anastasiia Bachynska	Ukraine

The women's artistic gymnastics floor exercise final at the 2018 Summer Youth Olympics was held at the America Pavilion on 15 October.

== Qualification ==
Qualification took place on 7 October. Anastasiia Bachynska from Ukraine qualified in first, followed by Italy's Giorgia Villa and Ksenia Klimenko of Russia.

The reserves were:

1. Lisa Zimmermann (GER)
2. Paulina Vargas (MEX)
3. Csenge Bácskay (HUN)

== Medalists ==
	Gold	Silver	Bronze
Floor exercise	Giorgia Villa (ITA)	Amelie Morgan (GBR)	Anastasiia Bachynska (UKR)

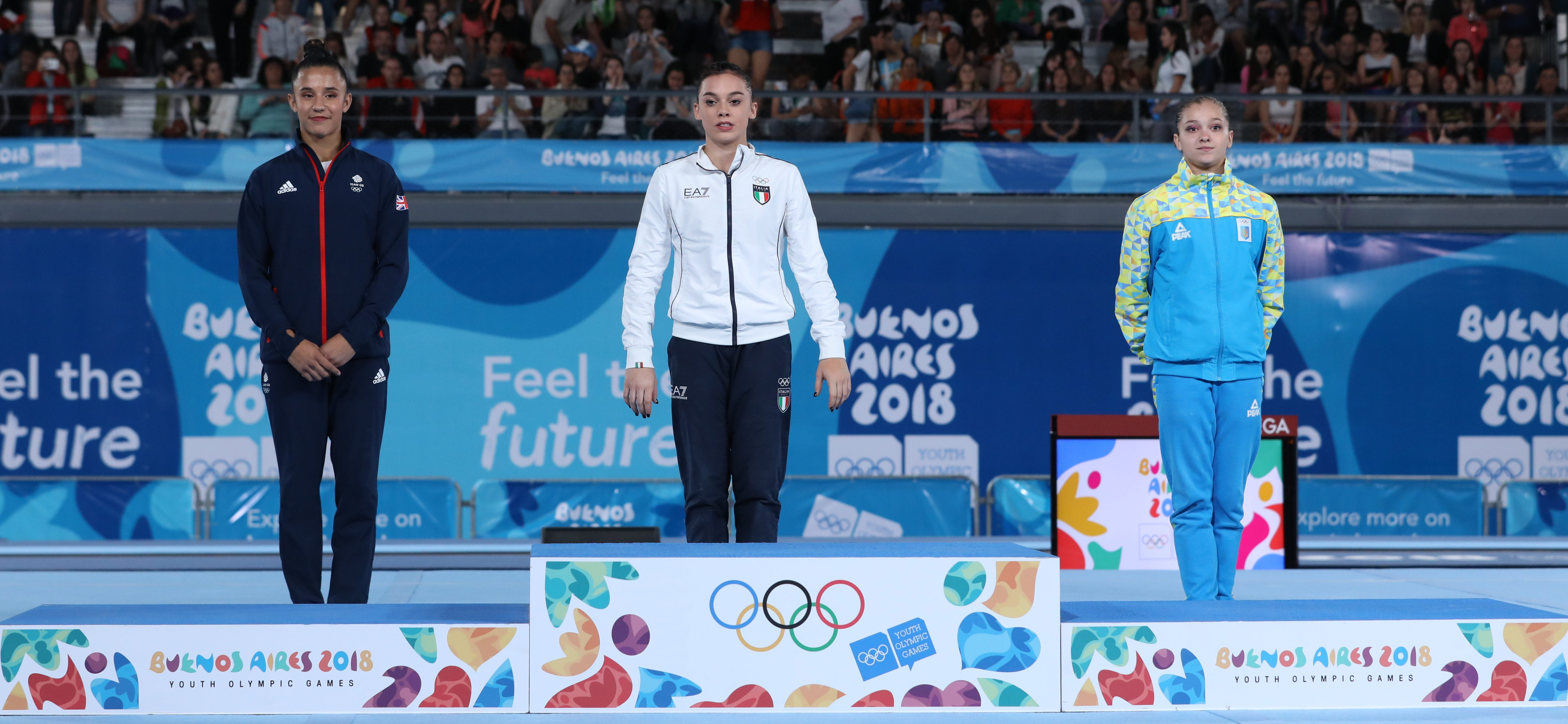
Victory ceremony, from left to right: Amelie Morgan, Giorgia Villa, Anastasiia Bachynska

== Results ==
Oldest and youngest competitors

	Name	Country	Date of birth	Age
Youngest	Ksenia Klimenko	Russia	1 November 2003	14 years, 11 months and 14 days
Oldest	Tang Xijing	China	3 January 2003	15 years, 9 months and 12 days
Oldest	Chiharu Yamada	Japan	3 January 2003	15 years, 9 months and 12 days

Rank	Gymnast	D Score	E Score	Pen.	Total
1st place, gold medalist(s)	Giorgia Villa (ITA)	4.800	8.500		13.300
2nd place, silver medalist(s)	Amelie Morgan (GBR)	5.000	8.233		13.233
3rd place, bronze medalist(s)	Anastasiia Bachynska (UKR)	5.000	8.166		13.166
4	Tang Xijing (CHN)	4.700	8.266		12.966
5	Emma Spence (CAN)	4.600	7.900	0.100	12.400
6	Chiharu Yamada (JPN)	4.900	7.500	0.400	12.000
7	Ksenia Klimenko (RUS)	5.000	7.000		12.000
8	Kate Sayer (AUS)	4.700	7.200		11.900

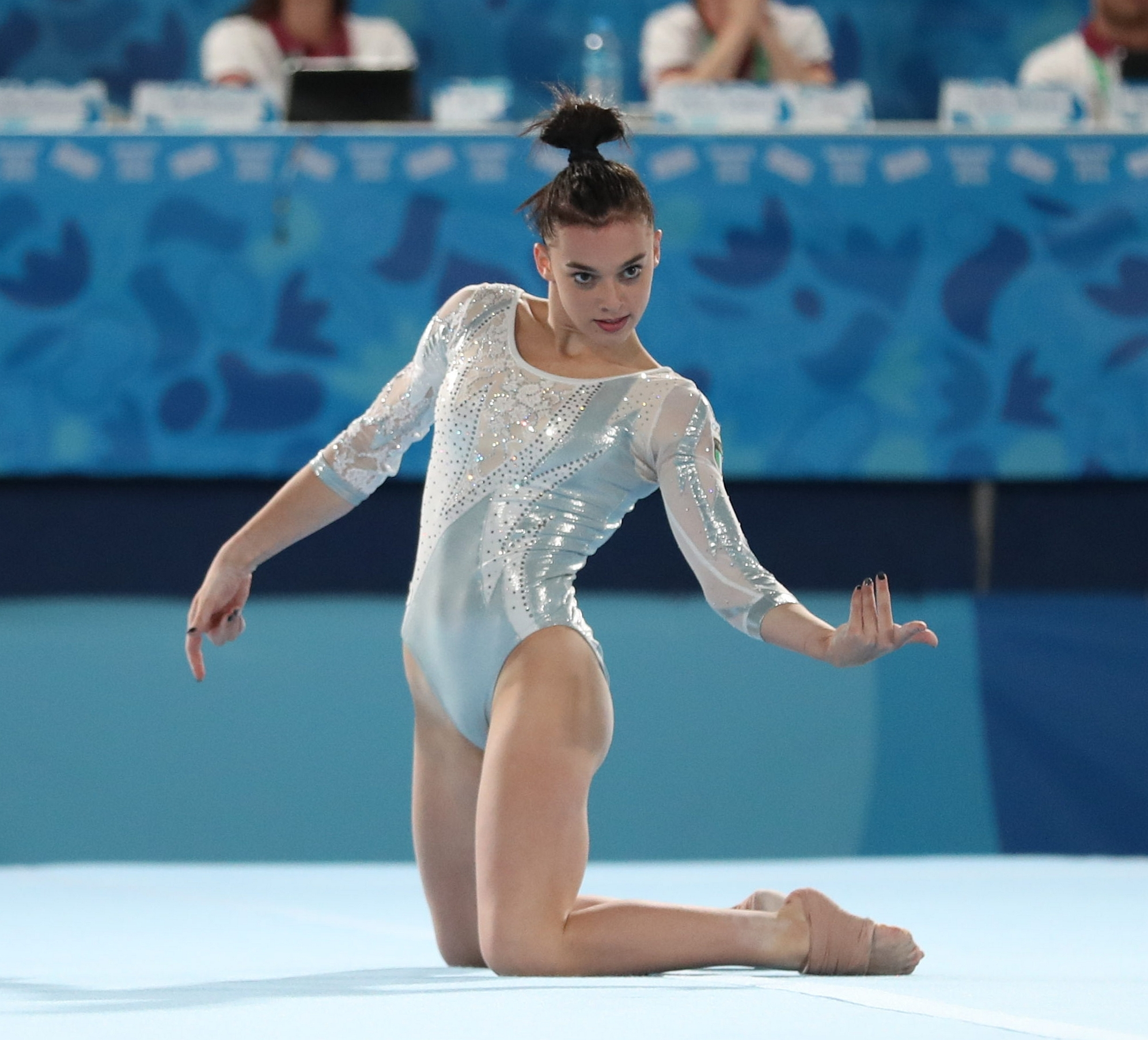
Giorgia Villa

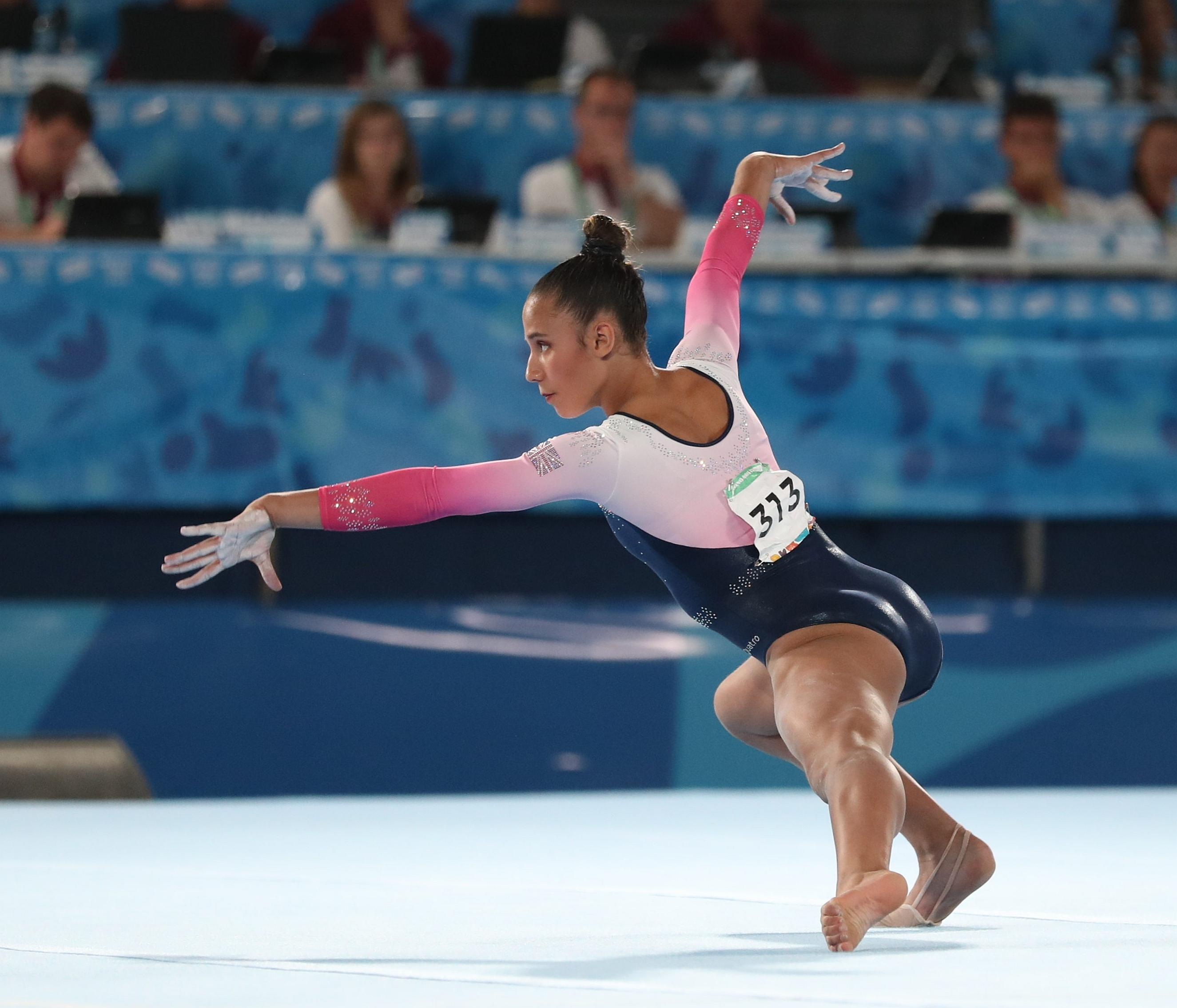
Amelie Morgan

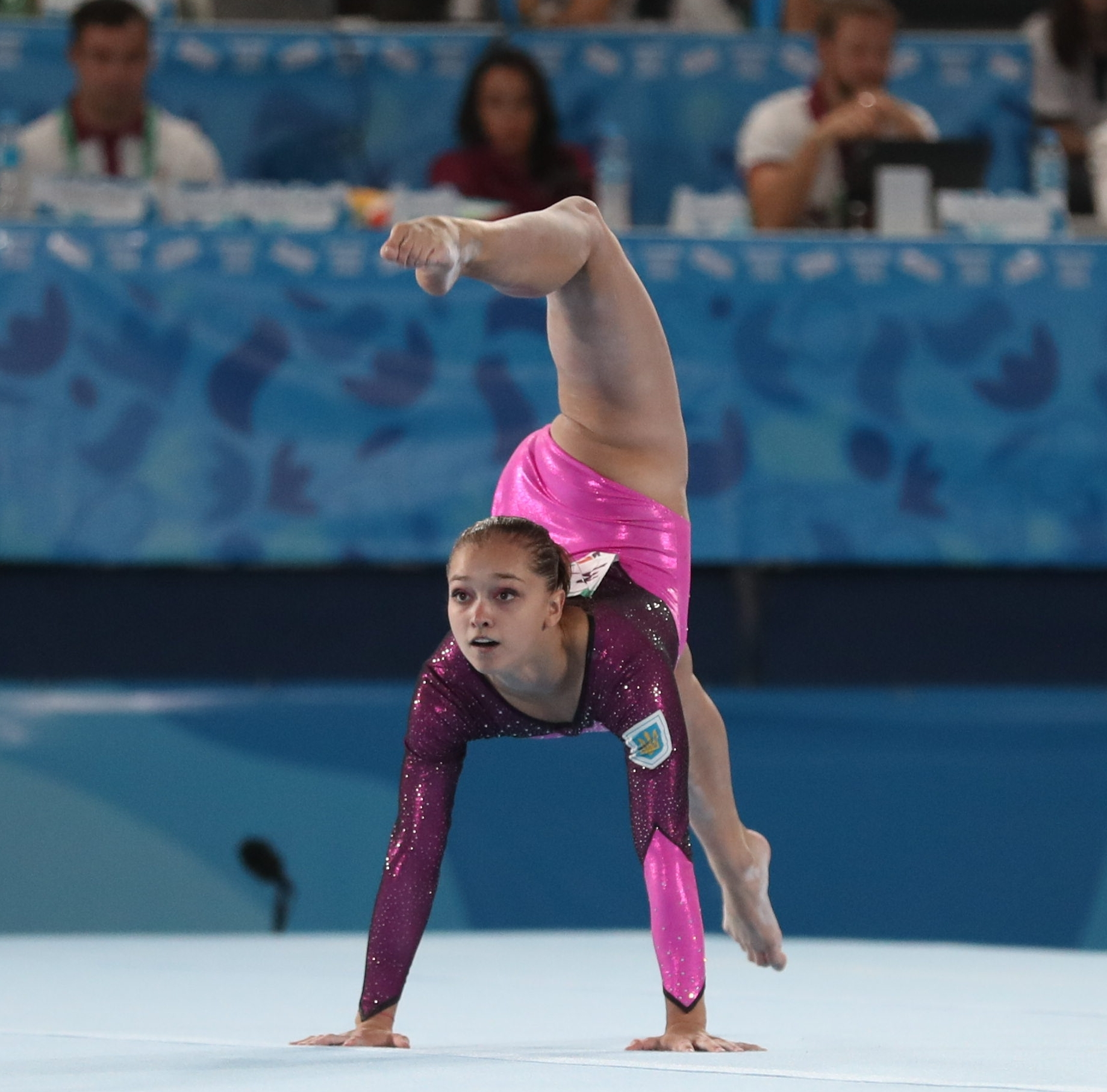
Anastasiia Bachynska

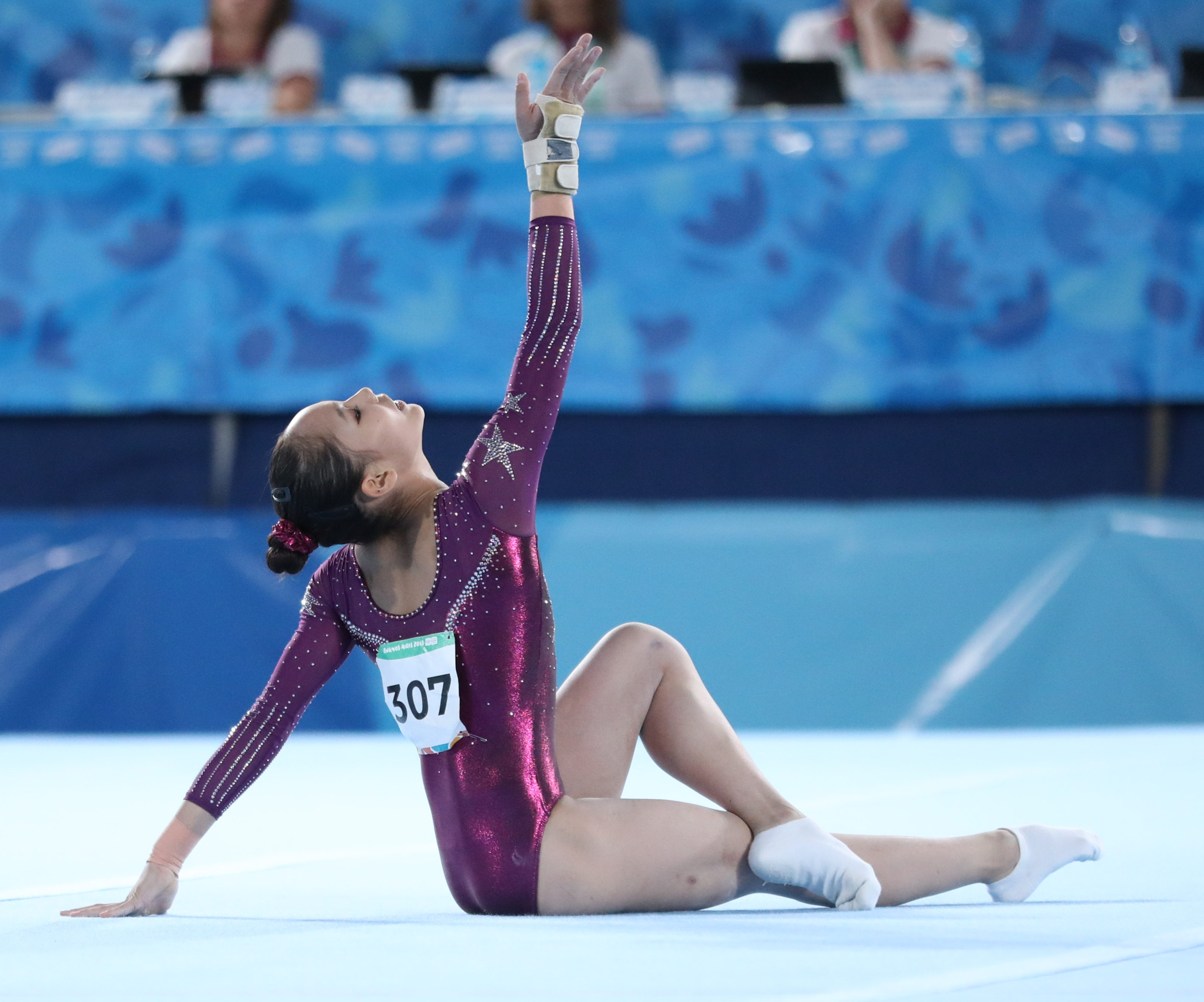
Tang Xijing

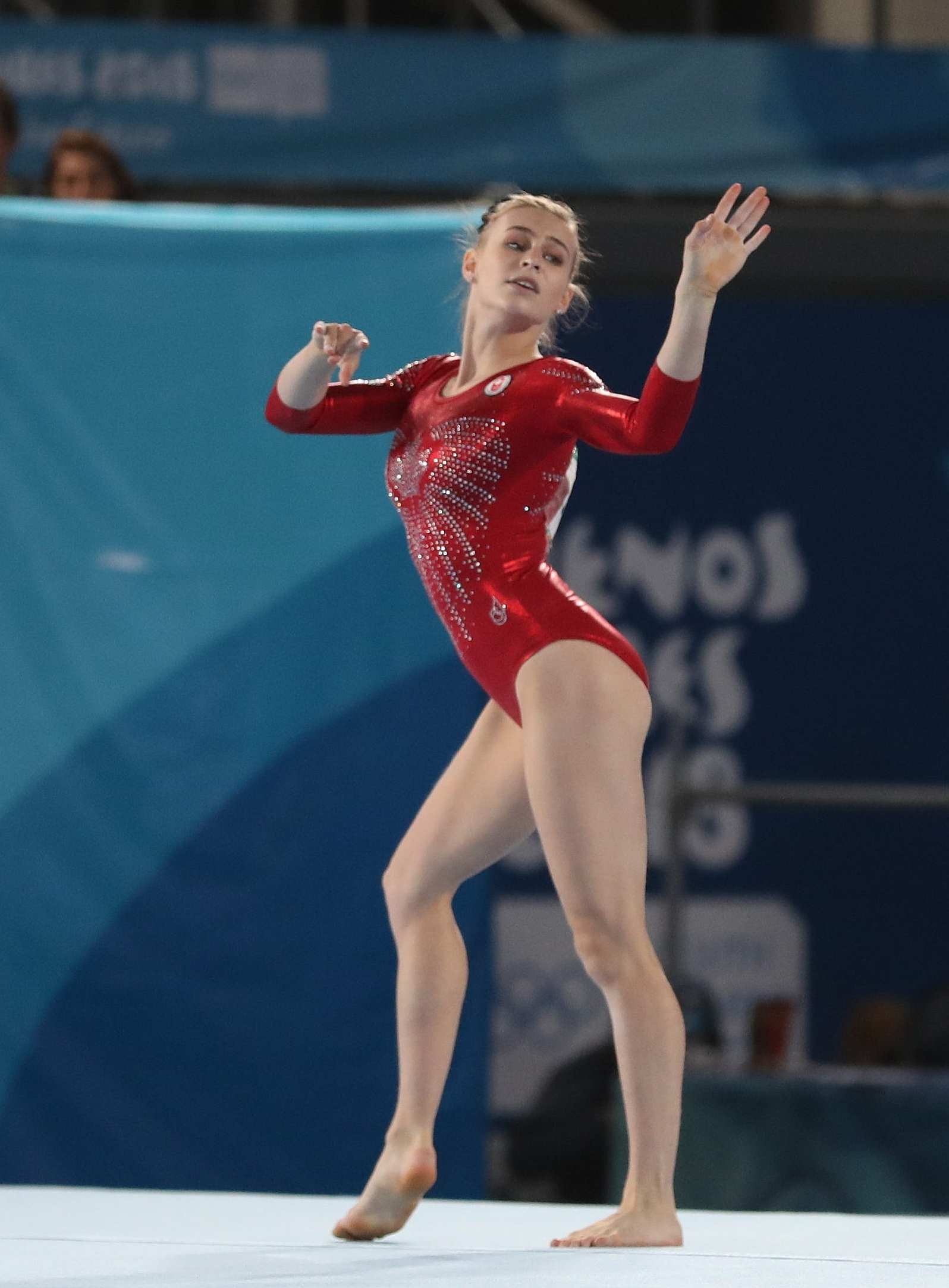
Emma Spence

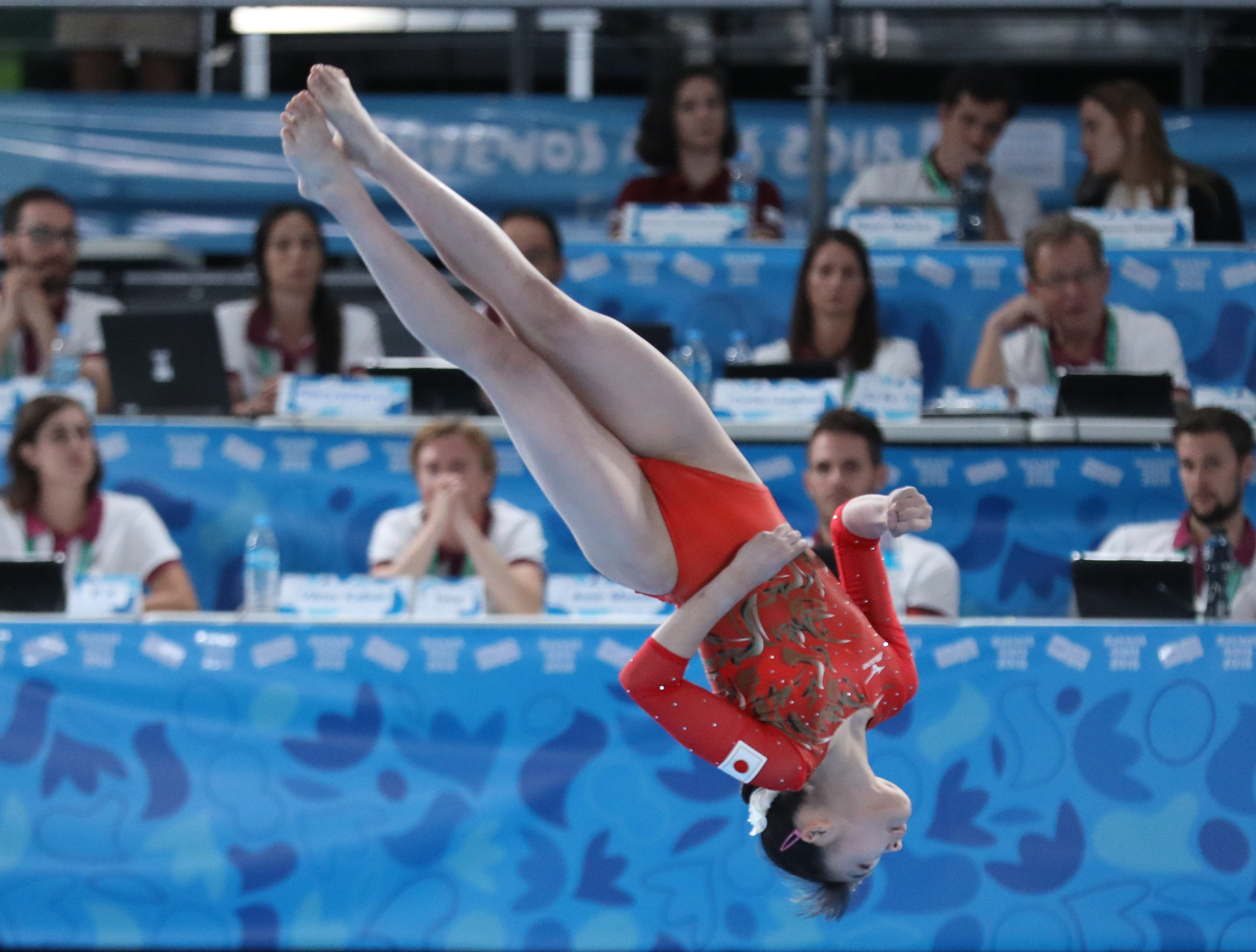
Chiharu Yamada

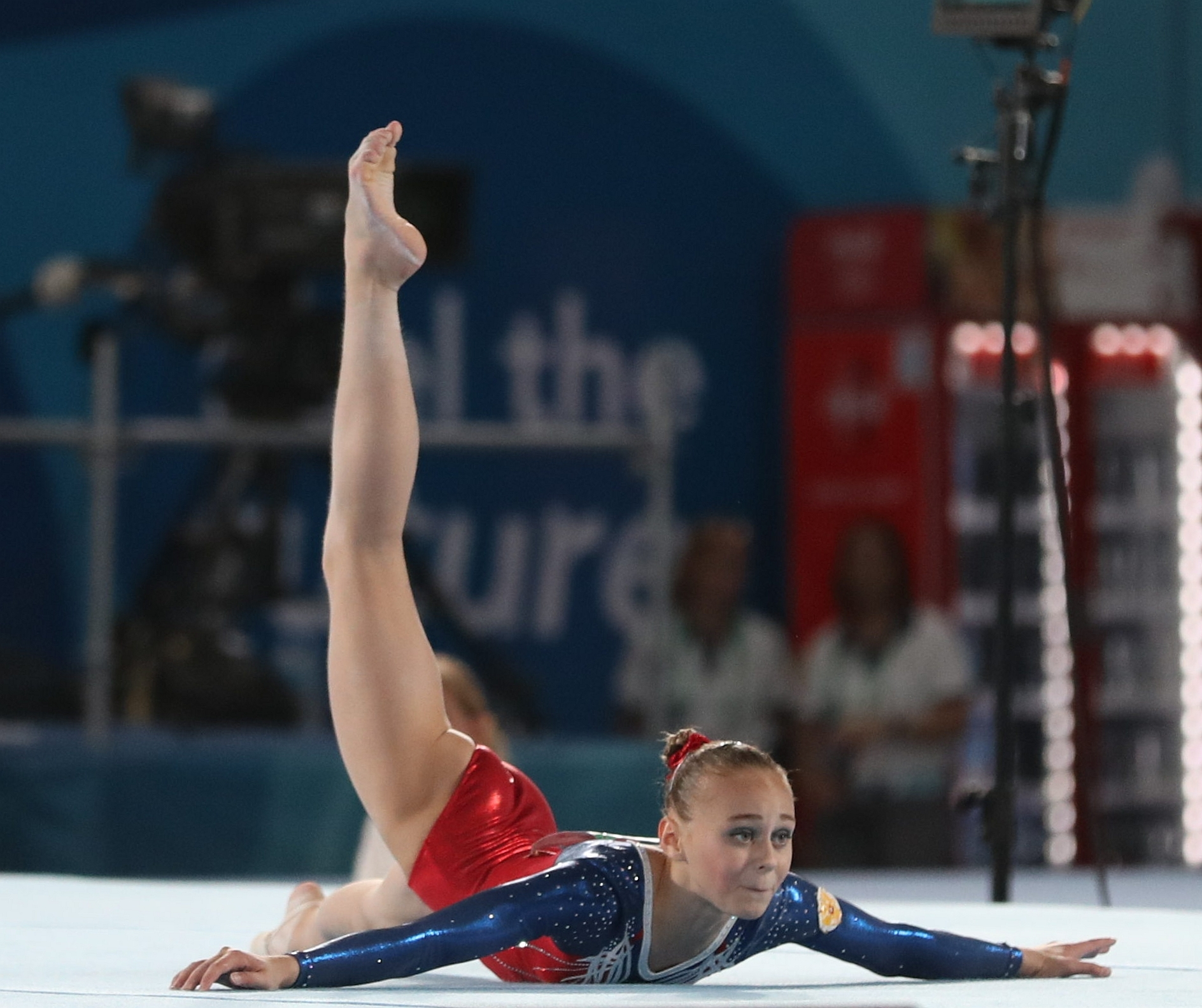
Ksenia Klimenko

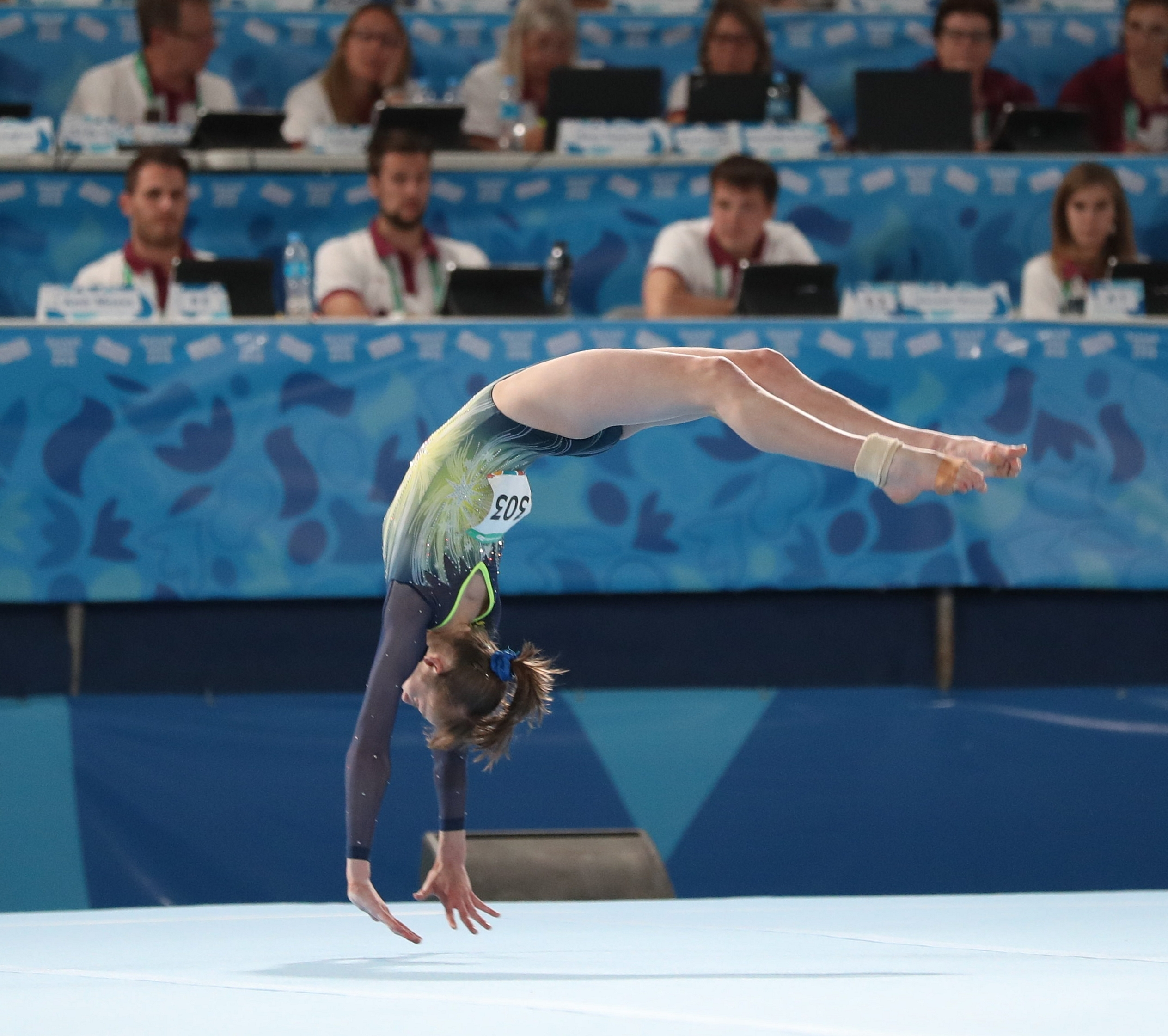
Kate Sayer
