= Gymnastics at the 2018 Summer Youth Olympics – Girls' artistic qualification =

Women's artistic gymnastics qualification at the 2018 Summer Youth Olympics was held at the Parque Polideportivo Roca from October 7–10. The results of the qualification determined the qualifiers to the finals: 18 gymnasts in the all-around final, and 8 gymnasts in each of 4 apparatus finals.

== Results ==
=== All-around ===
Qualification for the All-Around Final took place from October 7–10, with one event per day.

Rank	Gymnast	Vault (gymnastics)	Uneven bars	Balance beam	Floor (gymnastics)	Total	Qual.
1	Anastasiia Bachynska (UKR)	13.900	13.466	13.400	13.300	54.066	Q
2	Giorgia Villa (ITA)	14.400	14.100	12.333	13.133	53.966	Q
3	Tang Xijing (CHN)	13.375	13.333	13.800	12.766	53.274	Q
4	Amelie Morgan (GBR)	13.733	13.300	12.233	12.966	52.232	Q
5	Ksenia Klimenko (RUS)	12.100	13.266	13.100	13.033	51.499	Q
6	Emma Spence (CAN)	13.916	12.133	12.433	12.533	51.015	Q
7	Emma Slevin (IRL)	13.300	12.833	12.433	12.100	50.666	Q
8	Lisa Zimmermann (GER)	13.233	12.600	12.100	12.466	50.399	Q
9	Kate Sayer (AUS)	13.400	12.200	11.766	12.566	49.932	Q
10	Csenge Bácskay (HUN)	13.566	10.433	12.033	12.366	48.398	Q
11	Ada Hautala (FIN)	12.791	11.533	12.033	12.000	48.357	Q
12	Tonya Paulsson (SWE)	12.633	12.733	11.800	10.966	48.132	Q
13	Ana-Maria Puiu (ROU)	12.733	11.400	12.366	11.033	47.532	Q
14	Lee Yun-seo (KOR)	12.266	12.933	10.800	11.366	47.365	Q
15	Camila Montoya (CRC)	12.366	11.466	11.466	12.066	47.364	Q
16	Alba Petisco (ESP)	13.366	11.933	10.833	11.133	47.265	Q
17	Zeina Ibrahim (EGY)	12.800	10.966	11.266	11.966	46.998	Q
18	Eglė Stalinkevičiūtė (LTU)	12.900	11.566	10.300	12.200	46.966	Q
19	Laura Rocha (BRA)	11.800	11.633	11.366	11.933	46.732	R1
20	Aliaksandra Varabyova (BLR)	12.566	9.966	12.033	12.166	46.731	R2
21	Chiharu Yamada (JPN)	13.100	9.733	11.166	12.566	46.565	R3
22	Phạm Như Phương (VIE)	12.533	11.466	9.700	12.200	45.899	R4
23	Paulina Vargas (MEX)	11.966	11.966	9.266	12.400	45.598	–
24	Lisa Conradie (RSA)	12.266	12.100	9.900	11.166	45.432	–
25	Beatriz Cardoso (POR)	13.066	11.100	9.766	11.200	45.132	–
26	Zarith Khalid (MAS)	12.100	10.100	11.300	11.366	44.866	–
27	Tamara Anika Ong (SGP)	11.866	10.500	10.733	11.466	44.565	–
28	Milka Gehani Elpitiya (SRI)	12.733	8.966	11.333	11.266	44.298	–
29	Indira Ulmasova (UZB)	13.033	9.000	10.433	11.666	44.132	–
30	Karla Perez (GUA)	12.033	8.600	11.566	11.333	43.532	–
31	Nazlı Savranbaşı (TUR)	12.933	10.266	9.833	10.500	43.532	–
32	Elvira Katsali (GRE)	12.333	10.133	10.133	10.933	43.532	–
DNF	Kryxia Alicea (PUR)	12.533	–	10.366	11.966	–	DNF
DNF	Sofia Nair (ALG)	12.866	–	10.300	9.900	–	DNF
DNF	Olivia Araujo (ARG)	10.233	–	–	11.466	–	DNF

=== Vault ===
Qualification for the Vault Final was held on October 8.

Rank	Gymnast	D Score	E Score	Pen.	Score 1	D Score	E Score	Pen.	Score 2	Total	Qual.
Rank	Gymnast	Vault 1				Vault 2				Total	Qual.
1	Giorgia Villa (ITA)	5.400	9.000		14.400	4.600	9.166		13.766	14.043	Q
2	Anastasiia Bachynska (UKR)	5.000	8.900		13.900	4.600	9.133		13.733	13.816	Q
3	Emma Spence (CAN)	5.000	8.916		13.916	4.600	9.066		13.666	13.791	Q
4	Amelie Morgan (GBR)	4.600	9.133		13.733	4.000	9.166		13.166	13.449	Q
5	Csenge Bácskay (HUN)	4.600	8.966		13.566	5.000	8.266		13.266	13.416	Q
6	Lisa Zimmermann (GER)	4.800	8.433		13.233	4.600	8.766		13.366	13.299	Q
7	Kate Sayer (AUS)	4.600	8.800		13.400	4.000	9.000		13.000	13.200	Q
8	Emma Slevin (IRL)	4.600	8.700		13.300	4.000	9.100		13.100	13.200	Q
9	Tang Xijing (CHN)	4.600	8.775		13.375	4.000	8.966		12.966	13.170	R1
10	Indira Ulmasova (UZB)	4.200	8.833		13.033	4.600	8.500		13.100	13.066	R2
11	Alba Petisco (ESP)	4.600	8.766		13.366	4.000	8.758		12.758	13.062	R3

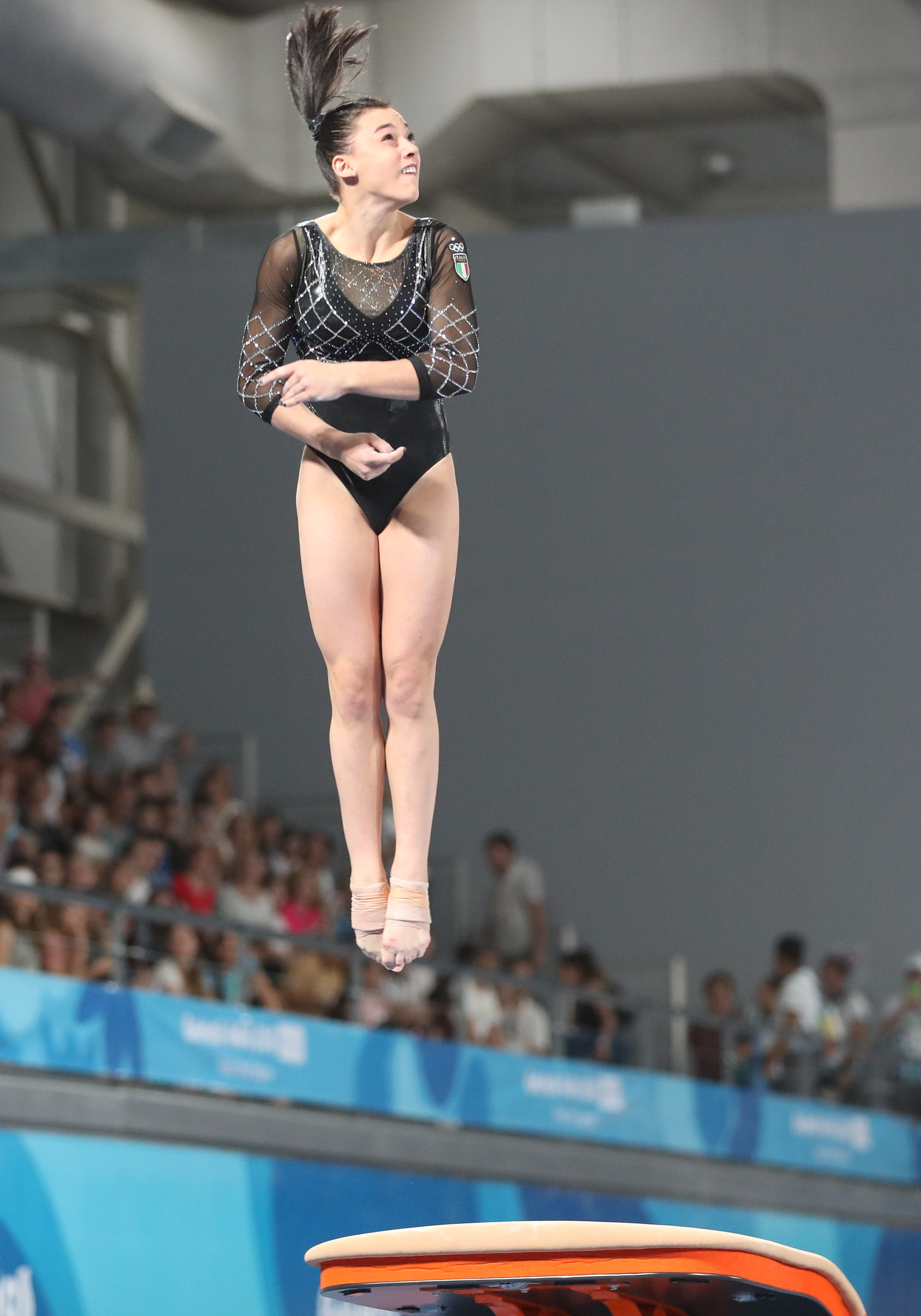
Giorgia Villa

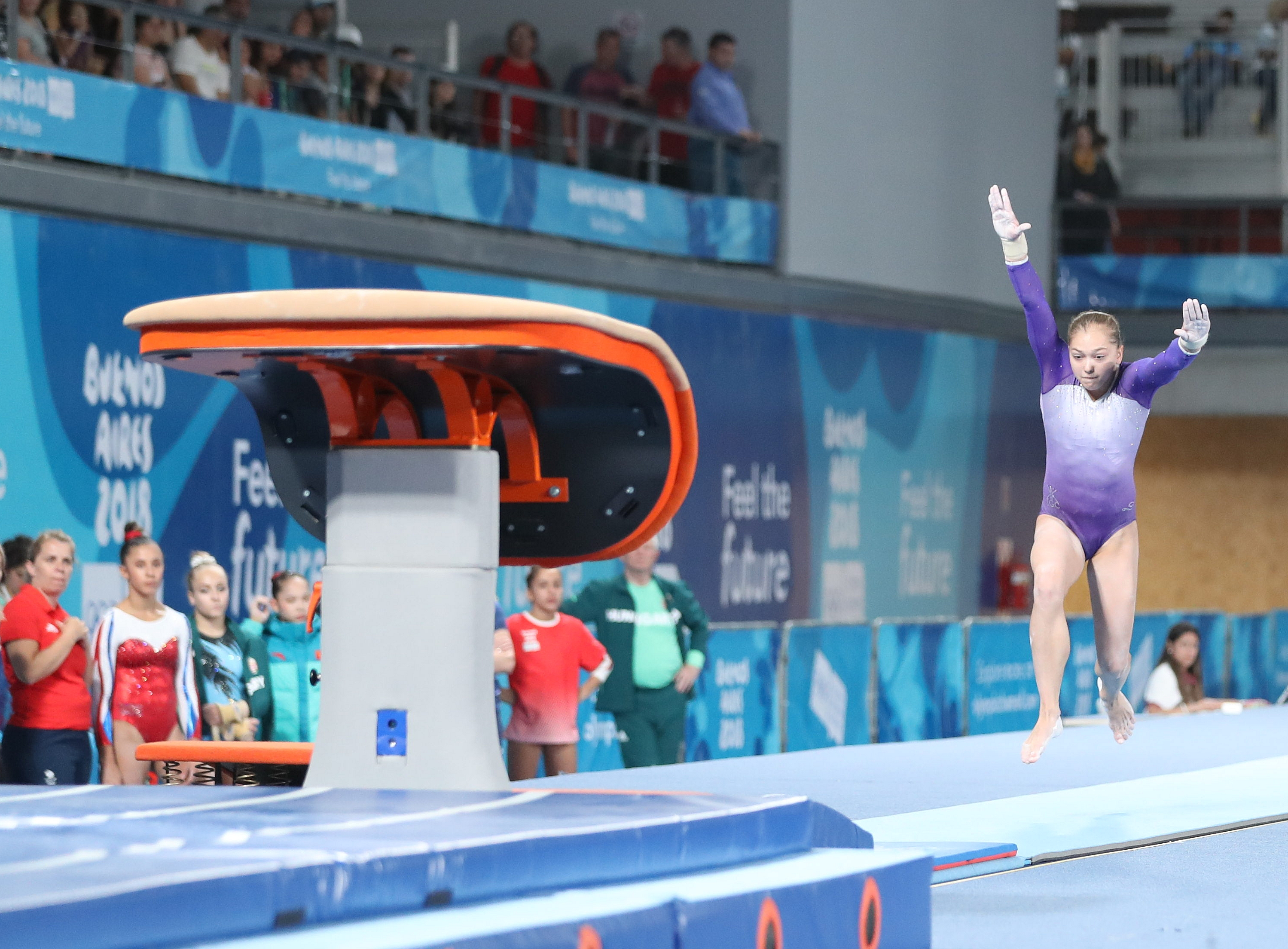
Anastasiia Bachynska

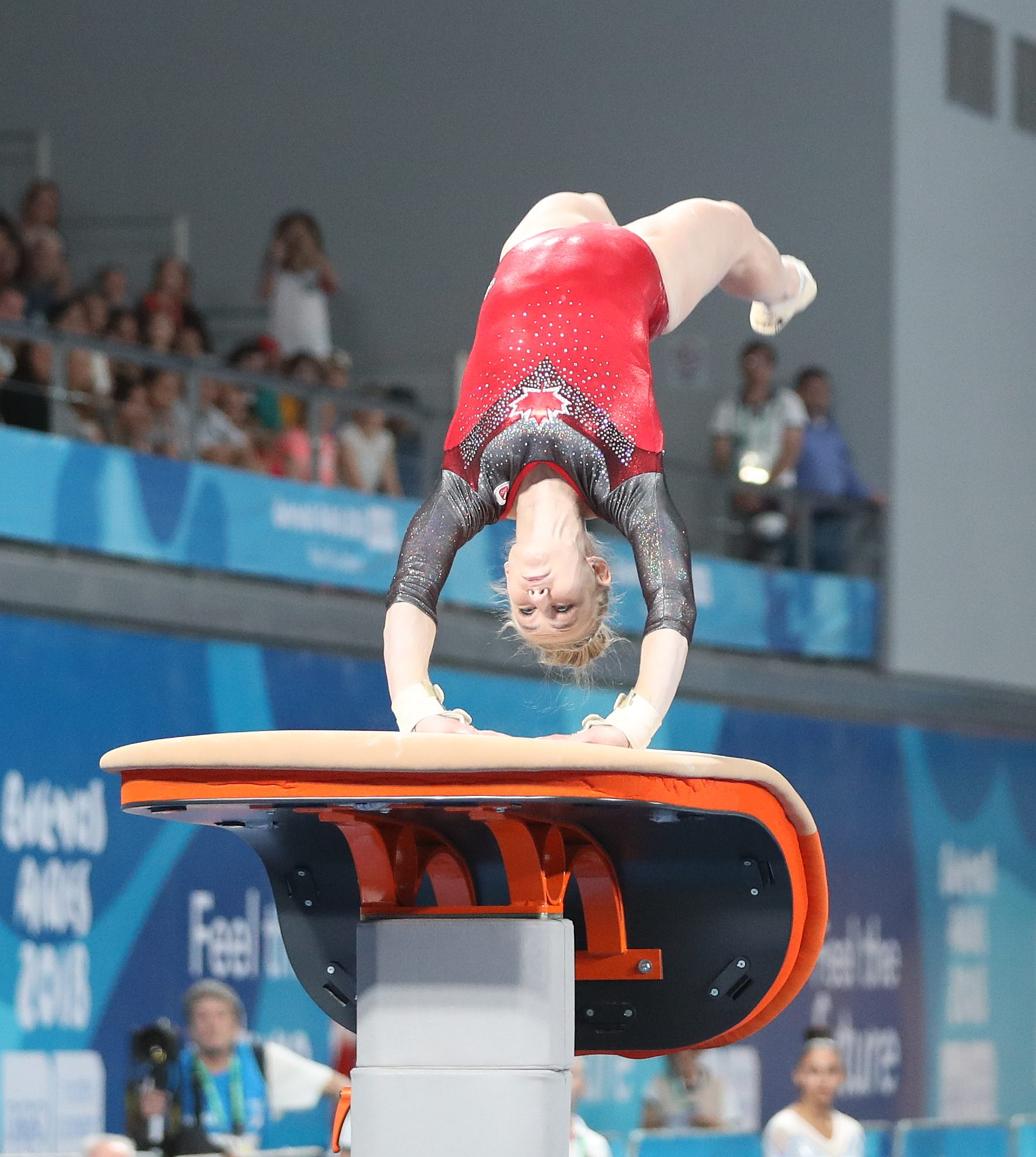
Emma Spence

=== Uneven bars ===
Qualification for the Uneven Bars Final was held on October 9.

Rank	Gymnast	D Score	E Score	Pen.	Total	Qual.
1	Giorgia Villa (ITA)	5.900	8.200		14.100	Q
2	Anastasiia Bachynska (UKR)	5.300	8.166		13.466	Q
3	Tang Xijing (CHN)	5.600	7.733		13.333	Q
4	Amelie Morgan (GBR)	5.100	8.200		13.300	Q
5	Ksenia Klimenko (RUS)	5.700	7.566		13.266	Q
6	Lee Yun-seo (KOR)	4.800	8.133		12.933	Q
7	Emma Slevin (IRL)	4.800	8.033		12.833	Q
8	Tonya Paulsson (SWE)	4.500	8.233		12.733	Q
9	Lisa Zimmermann (GER)	4.700	7.900		12.600	R1
10	Kate Sayer (AUS)	4.900	7.300		12.200	R2
11	Emma Spence (CAN)	5.200	6.933		12.133	R3

=== Balance beam ===
Qualification for the Balance Beam Final was held on October 10.

Rank	Gymnast	D Score	E Score	Pen.	Total	Qual.
1	Tang Xijing (CHN)	6.200	7.600		13.800	Q
2	Anastasiia Bachynska (UKR)	5.700	7.700		13.400	Q
3	Ksenia Klimenko (RUS)	5.500	7.600		13.100	Q
4	Emma Slevin (IRL)	4.600	7.833		12.433	Q
5	Emma Spence (CAN)	4.800	7.633		12.433	Q
6	Ana-Maria Puiu (ROU)	4.700	7.666		12.366	Q
7	Giorgia Villa (ITA)	5.200	7.133		12.333	Q
8	Amelie Morgan (GBR)	5.200	7.033		12.233	Q
9	Lisa Zimmermann (GER)	4.900	7.200		12.100	R1
10	Ada Hautala (FIN)	4.600	7.433		12.033	R2
11	Csenge Bácskay (HUN)	4.800	7.233		12.033	R3

=== Floor exercise ===
Qualification for the Floor Exercise Final was held on October 7.

Rank	Gymnast	D Score	E Score	Pen.	Total	Qual.
1	Anastasiia Bachynska (UKR)	5.000	8.300		13.300	Q
2	Giorgia Villa (ITA)	4.700	8.433		13.133	Q
3	Ksenia Klimenko (RUS)	4.900	8.133		13.033	Q
4	Amelie Morgan (GBR)	5.000	8.066	0.100	12.966	Q
5	Tang Xijing (CHN)	4.400	8.366		12.766	Q
6	Chiharu Yamada (JPN)	4.700	7.866		12.566	Q
7	Kate Sayer (AUS)	4.900	7.666		12.566	Q
8	Emma Spence (CAN)	4.700	7.933	0.100	12.533	Q
9	Lisa Zimmermann (GER)	4.500	7.966		12.466	R1
10	Paulina Vargas (MEX)	4.500	7.900		12.400	R2
11	Csenge Bácskay (HUN)	4.600	7.766		12.366	R3

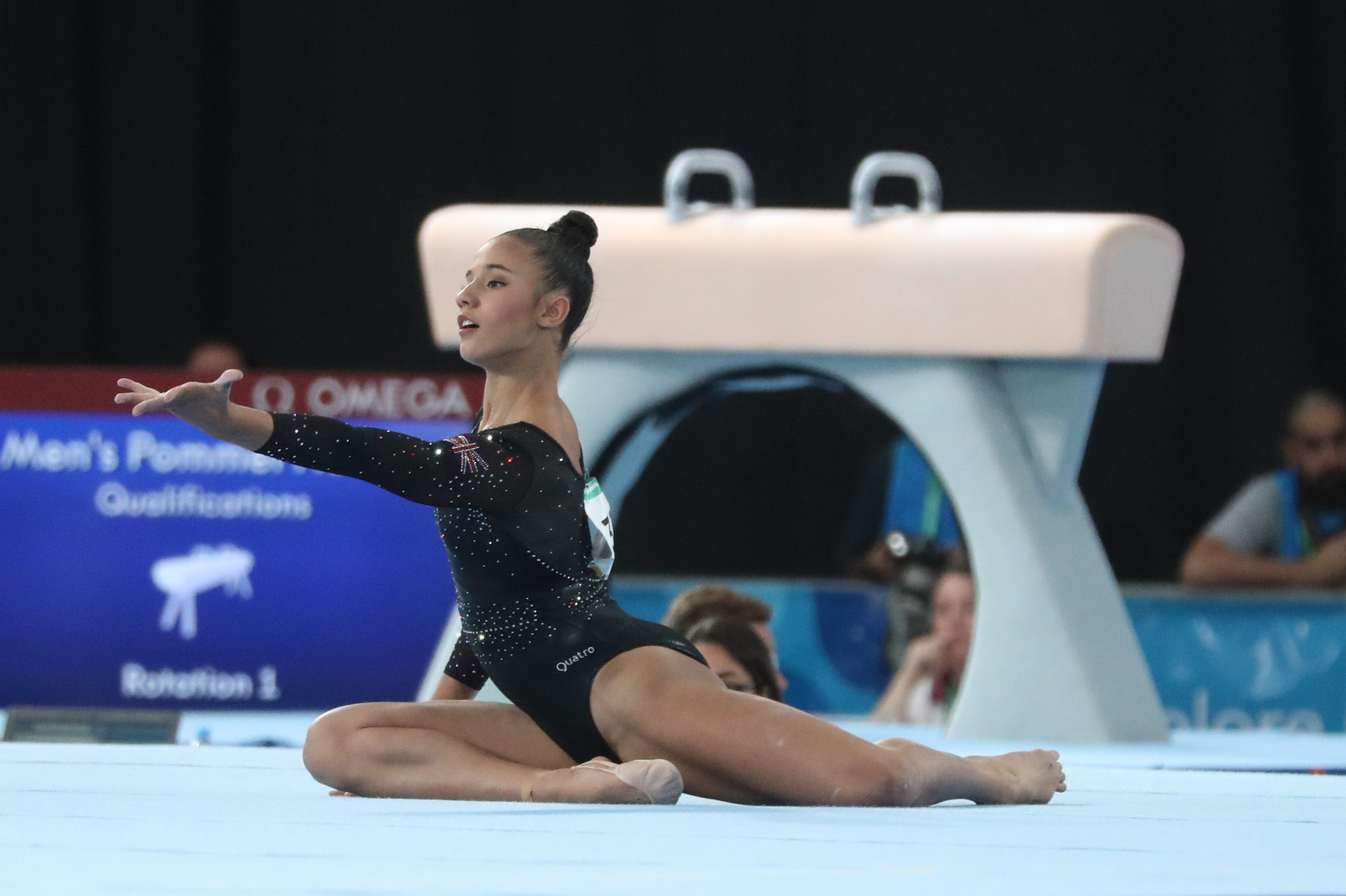
Amelie Morgan

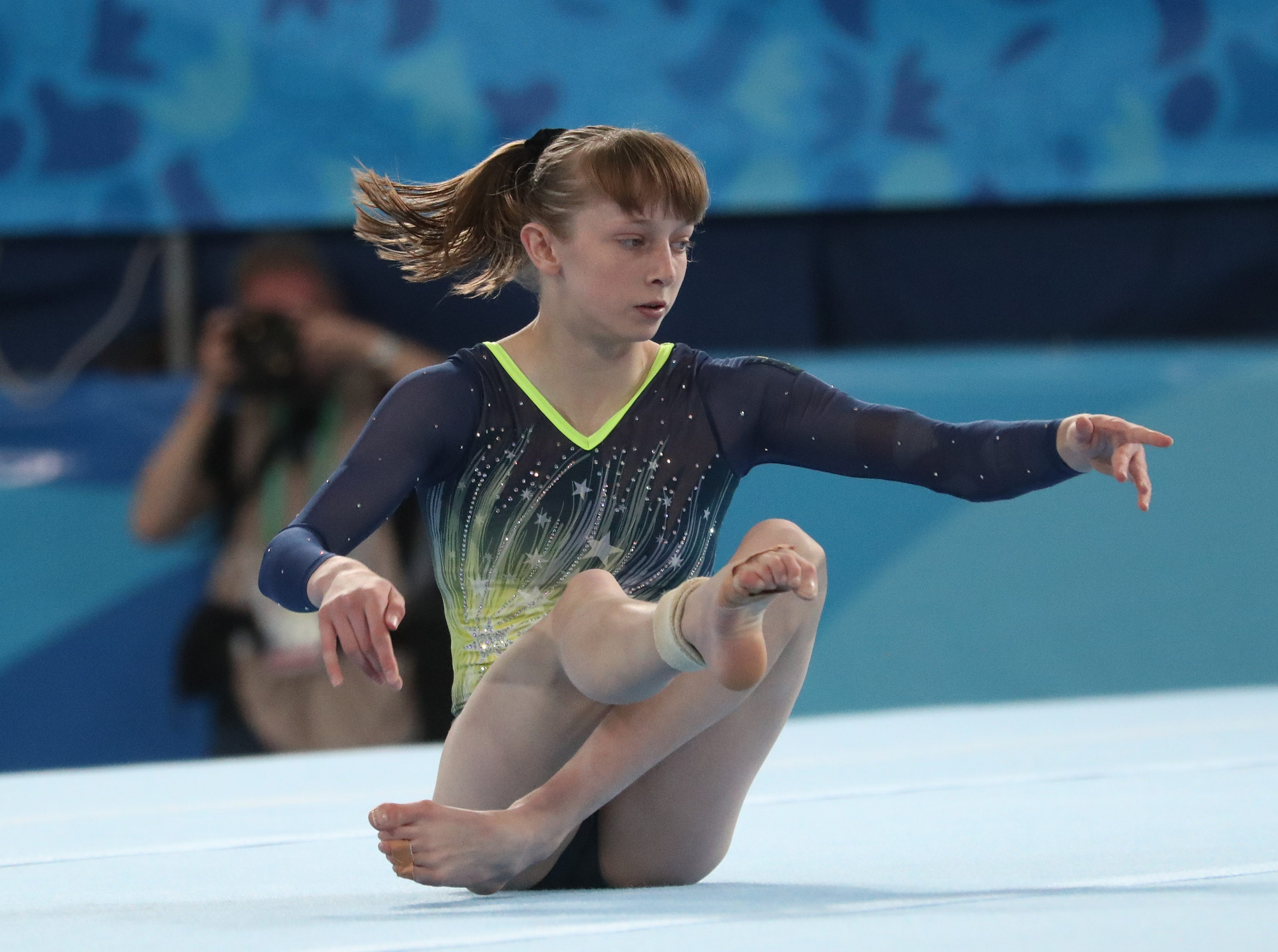
Kate Sayer
