= Gymnastics at the 2018 Summer Youth Olympics – Girls' vault =

Women's vault at the III Summer Youth Olympic Games
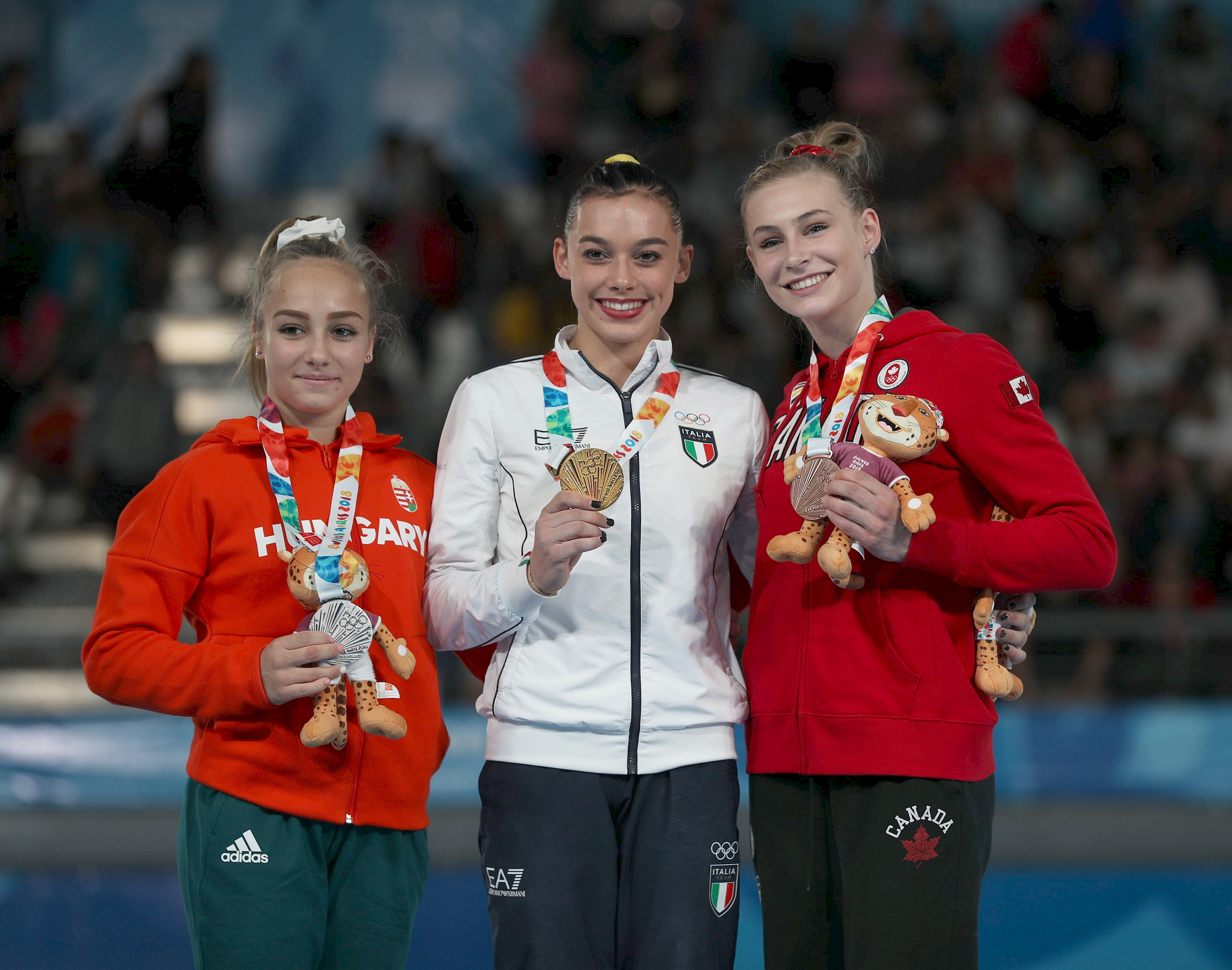
- Venue: America Pavilion
- Date: October 13
- Competitors: 8 from 8 nations
- Winning score: 14.233

Medalists
| 1st place, gold medalist(s) | | Giorgia Villa | Italy |
| 2nd place, silver medalist(s) | | Csenge Bácskay | Hungary |
| 3rd place, bronze medalist(s) | | Emma Spence | Canada |

The girls' vault competition at the 2018 Summer Youth Olympics was held at the America Pavilion on October 13.

== Qualification ==
Qualification took place on October 8. Giorgia Villa from Italy qualified in first, followed by Ukraine's Anastasiia Bachynska and Emma Spence of Canada.

The reserves were:

1. Tang Xijing (CHN)
2. Indira Ulmasova (UZB)
3. Alba Petisco (ESP)

== Medalists ==
| | Gold | Silver | Bronze |
|---|---|---|---|
| Vault | Giorgia Villa (ITA) | Csenge Bácskay (HUN) | Emma Spence (CAN) |

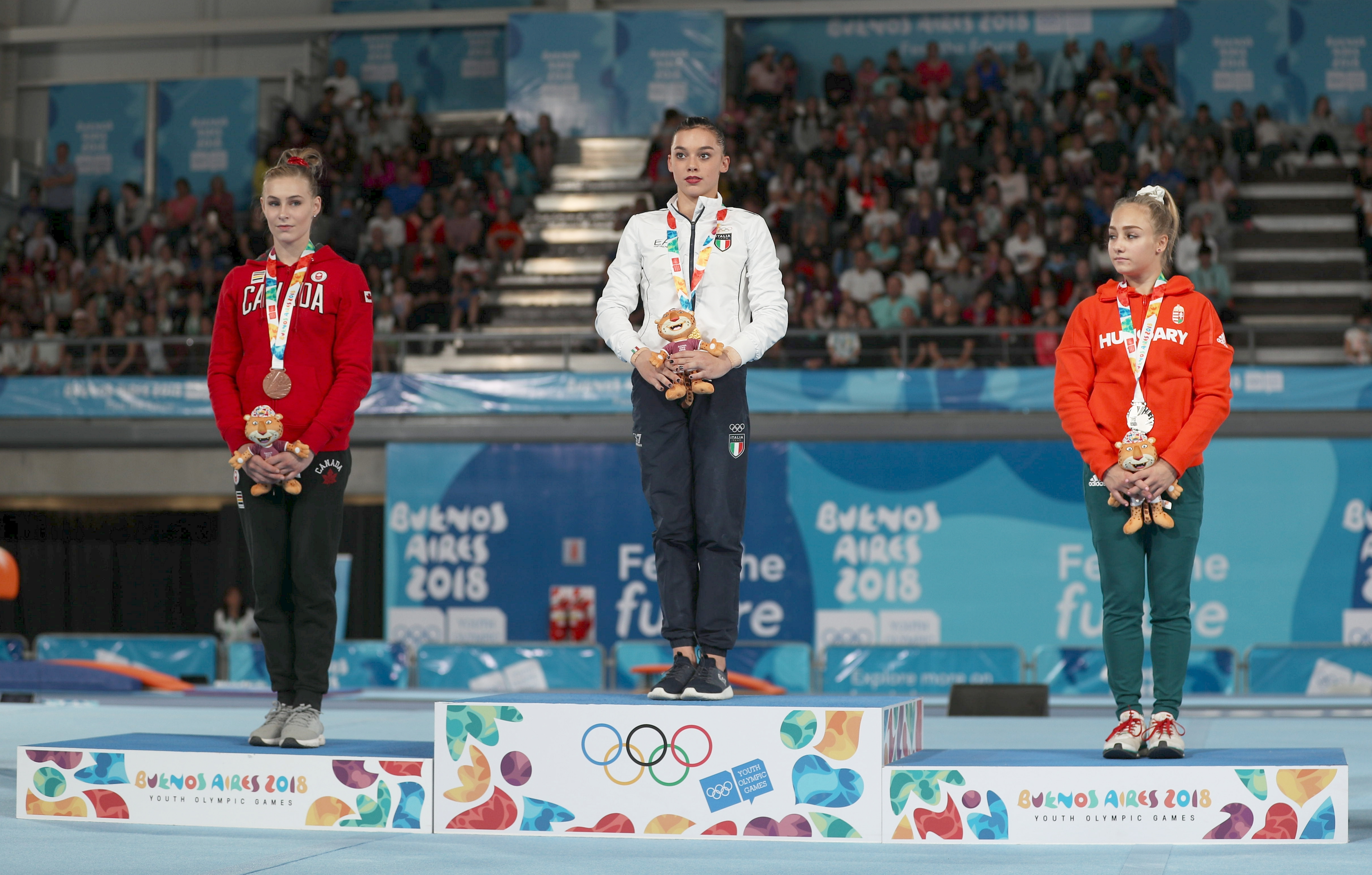
Victory ceremony, from left to right: Emma Spence, Giorgia Villa, Csenge Bácskay

== Results ==
Oldest and youngest competitors

| | Name | Country | Date of birth | Age |
|---|---|---|---|---|
| Youngest | Anastasiia Bachynska | Ukraine | 4 August 2003 | 15 years, 2 months and 9 days |
| Oldest | Lisa Zimmermann | Germany | 13 February 2003 | 15 years and 8 months |

| Rank | Gymnast | D Score | E Score | Pen. | Score 1 | D Score | E Score | Pen. | Score 2 | Total |
| Rank | Gymnast | Vault 1 | | | | Vault 2 | | | | Total |
|---|---|---|---|---|---|---|---|---|---|---|
| 1st place, gold medalist(s) | Giorgia Villa (ITA) | 5.400 | 9.200 | | 14.600 | 4.600 | 9.266 | | 13.866 | 14.233 |
| 2nd place, silver medalist(s) | Csenge Bácskay (HUN) | 5.000 | 8.833 | | 13.833 | 5.400 | 8.633 | | 14.033 | 13.933 |
| 3rd place, bronze medalist(s) | Emma Spence (CAN) | 5.000 | 8.533 | | 13.533 | 4.600 | 8.833 | | 13.433 | 13.483 |
| 4 | Anastasiia Bachynska (UKR) | 5.000 | 8.500 | 0.300 | 13.200 | 4.600 | 9.000 | | 13.600 | 13.400 |
| 5 | Lisa Zimmermann (GER) | 4.800 | 8.566 | | 13.366 | 4.600 | 8.766 | | 13.366 | 13.366 |
| 6 | Amelie Morgan (GBR) | 4.600 | 9.000 | 0.100 | 13.500 | 4.000 | 9.133 | | 13.133 | 13.316 |
| 7 | Kate Sayer (AUS) | 4.600 | 8.833 | | 13.433 | 4.000 | 9.066 | | 13.066 | 13.249 |
| 8 | Emma Slevin (IRL) | 4.000 | 8.700 | | 12.700 | 4.600 | 8.466 | | 13.066 | 12.883 |

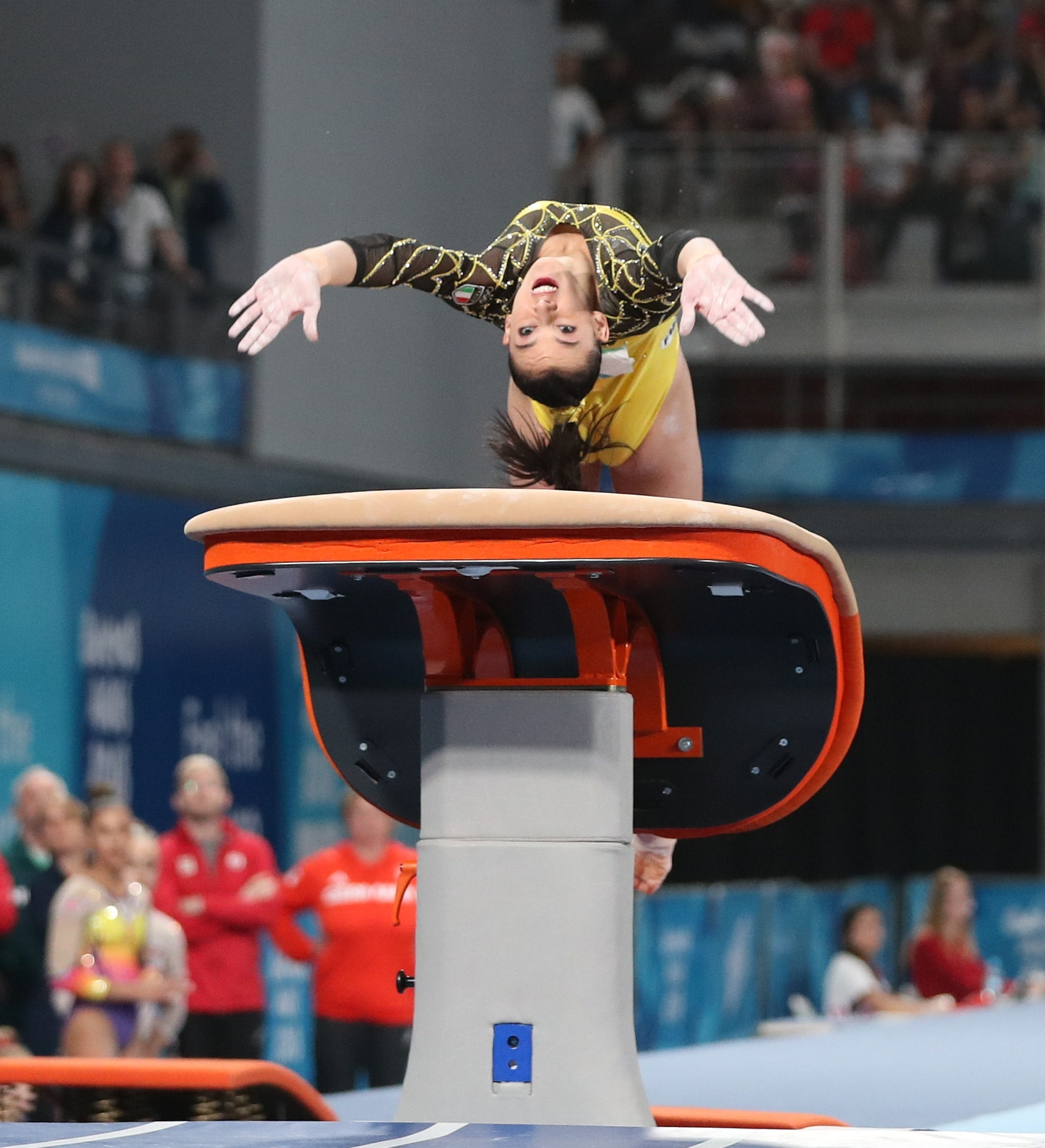
Giorgia Villa

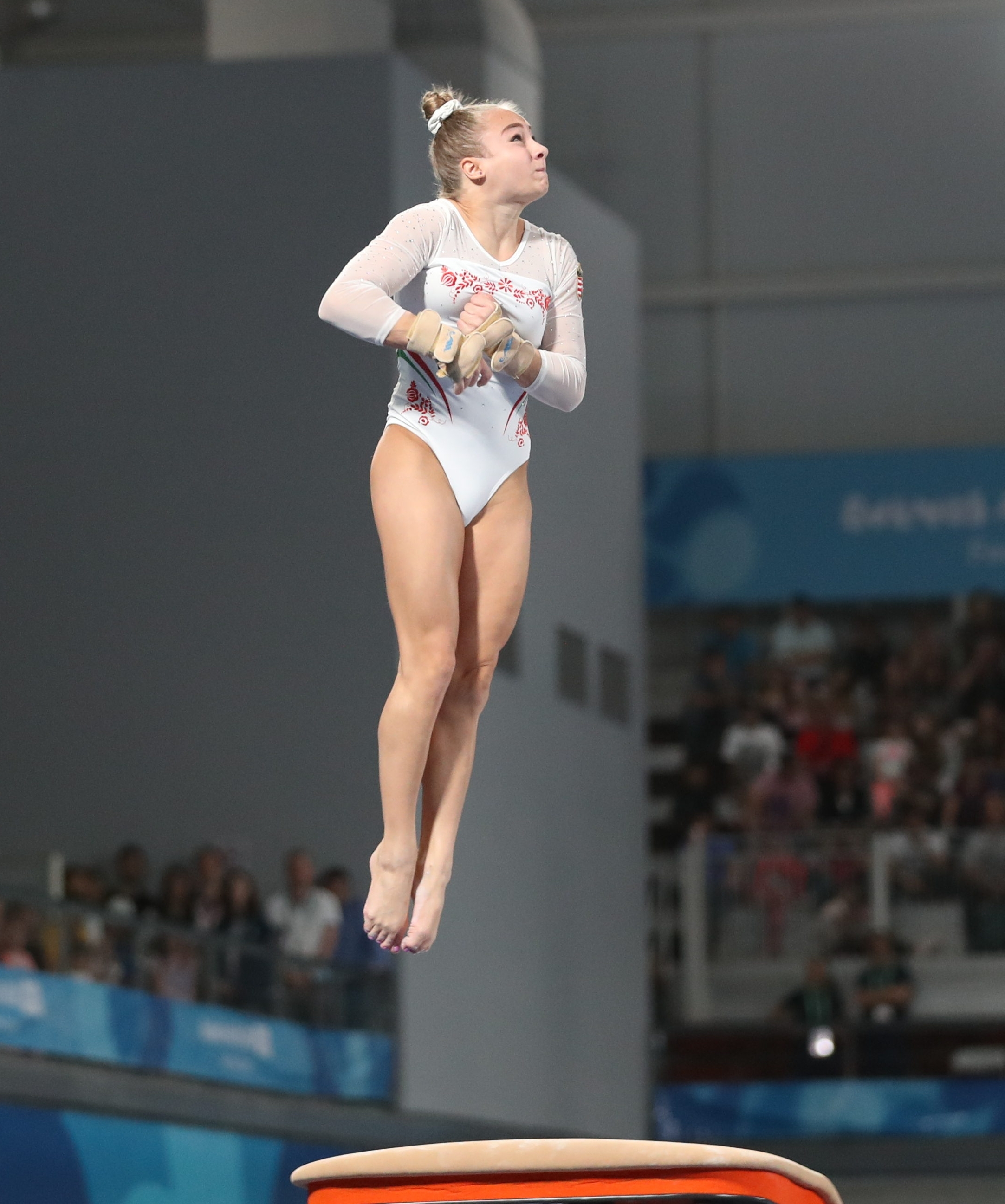
Csenge Bácskay

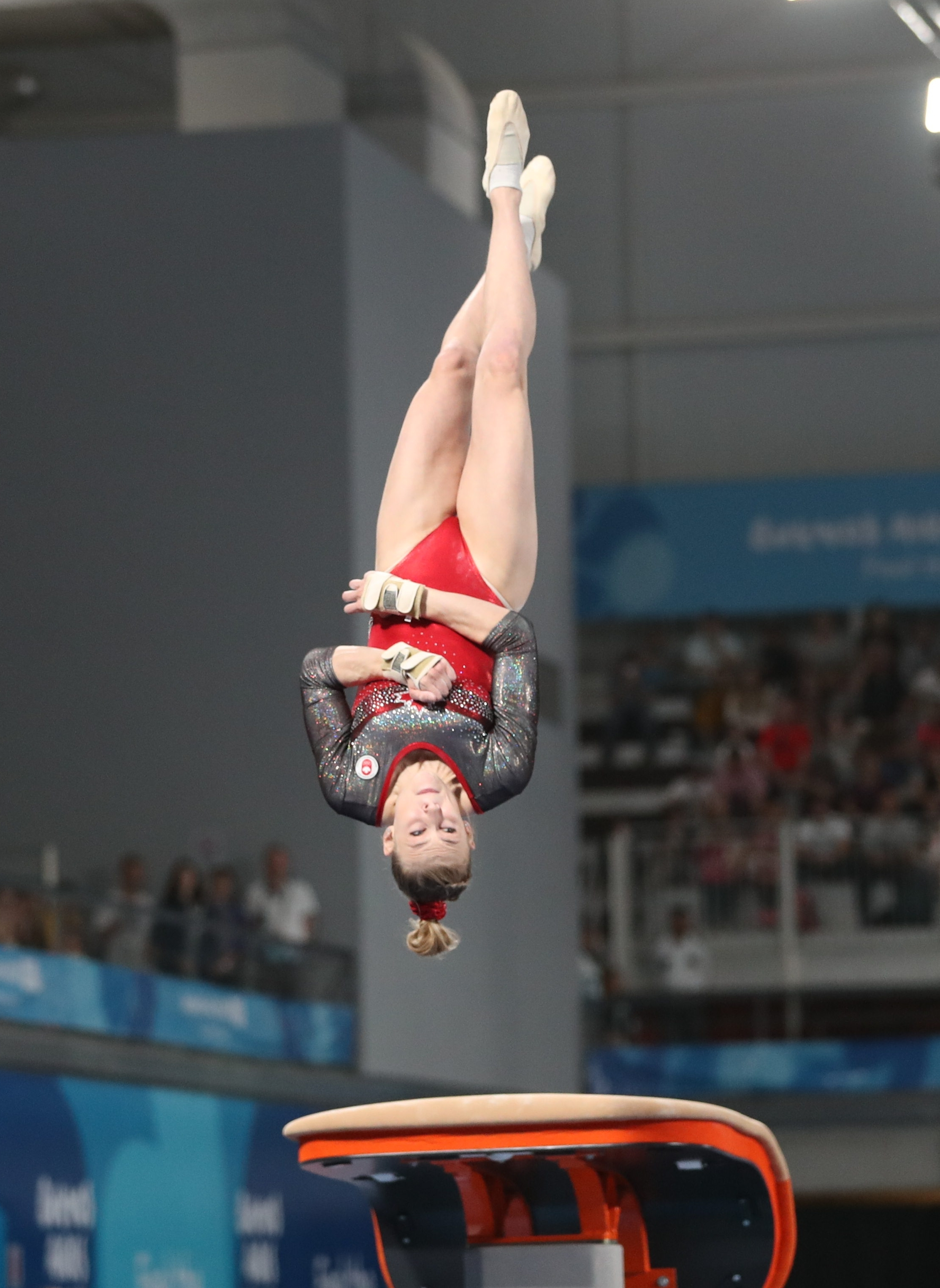
Emma Spence

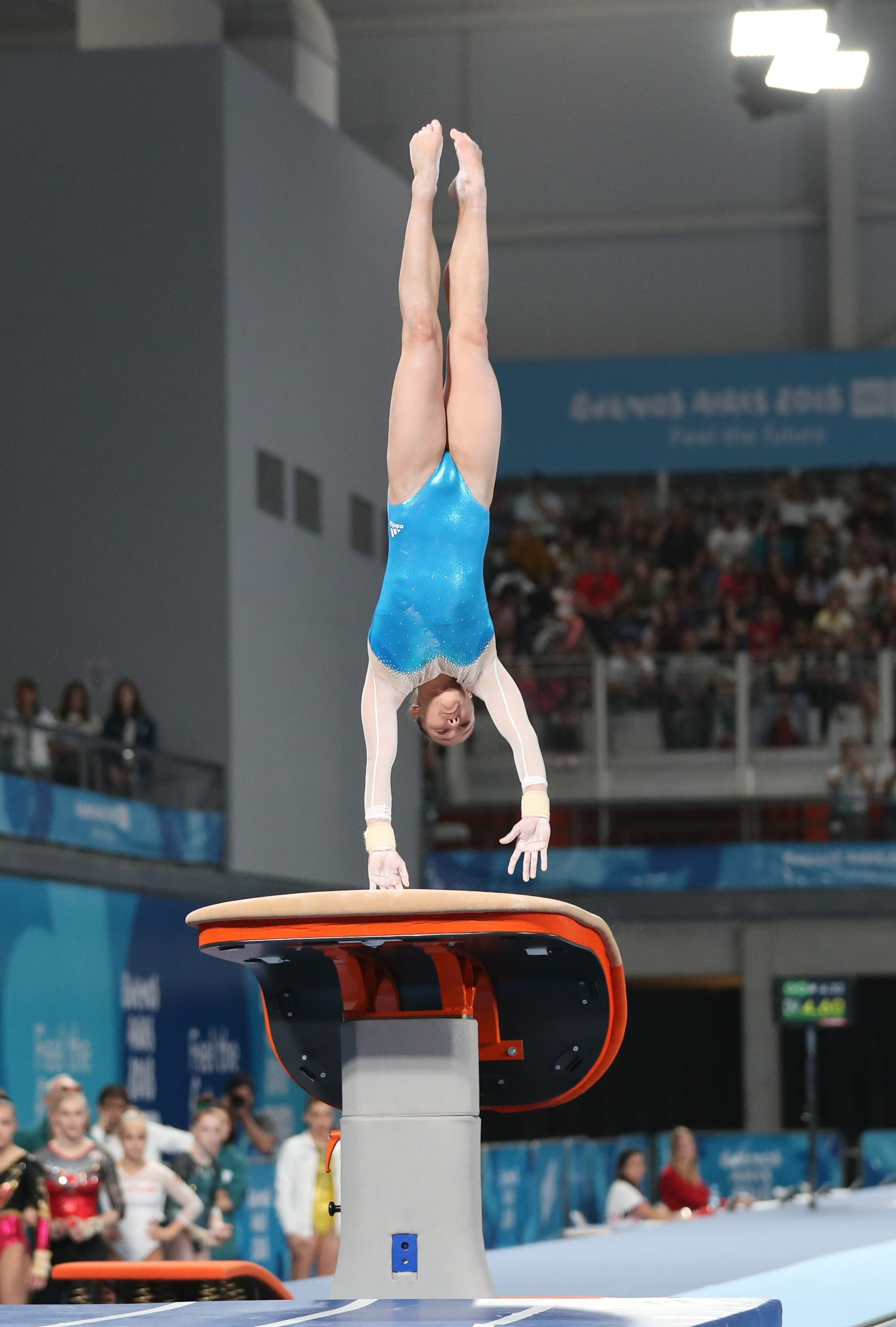
Anastasiia Bachynska

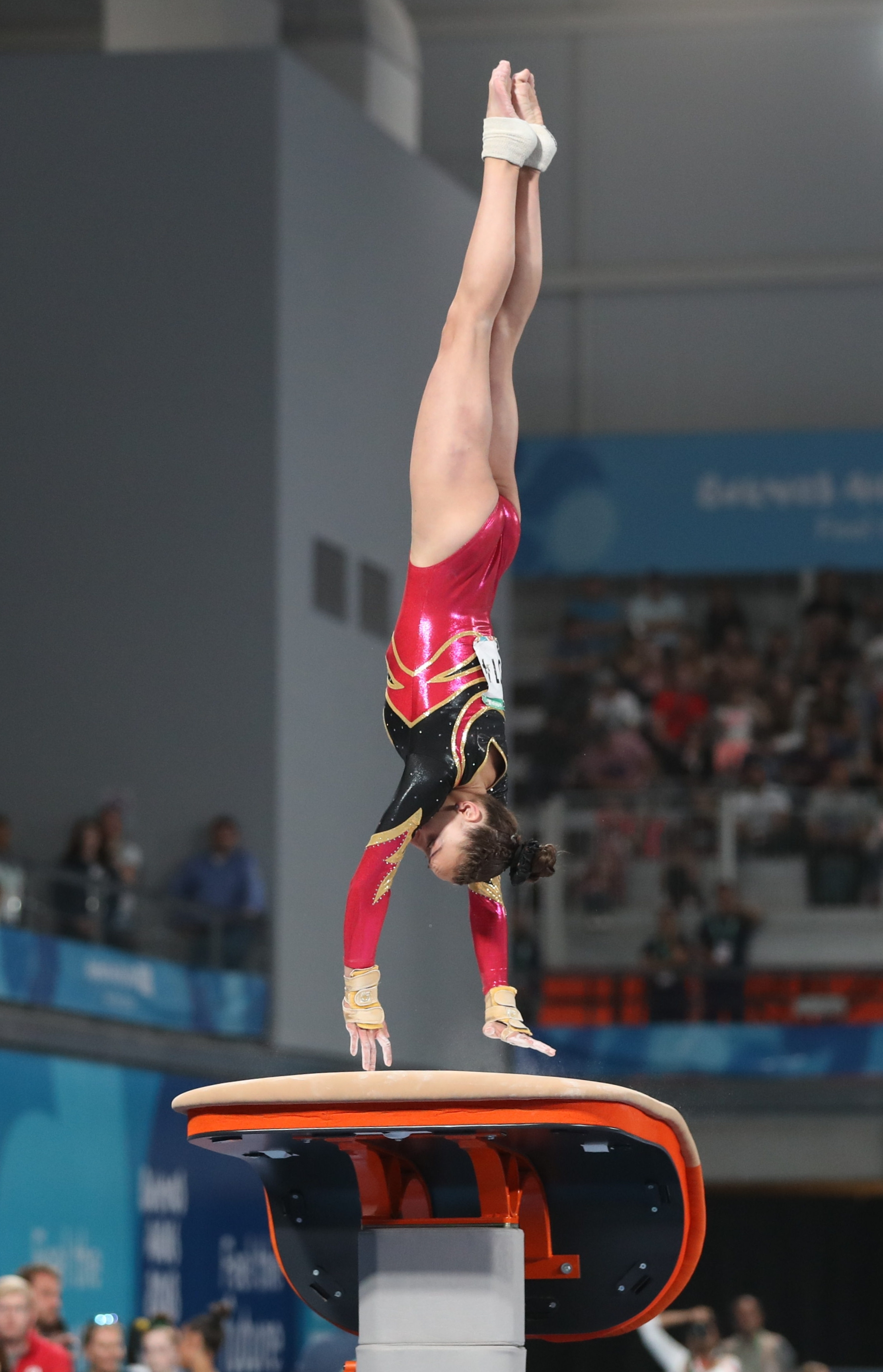
Lisa Zimmermann

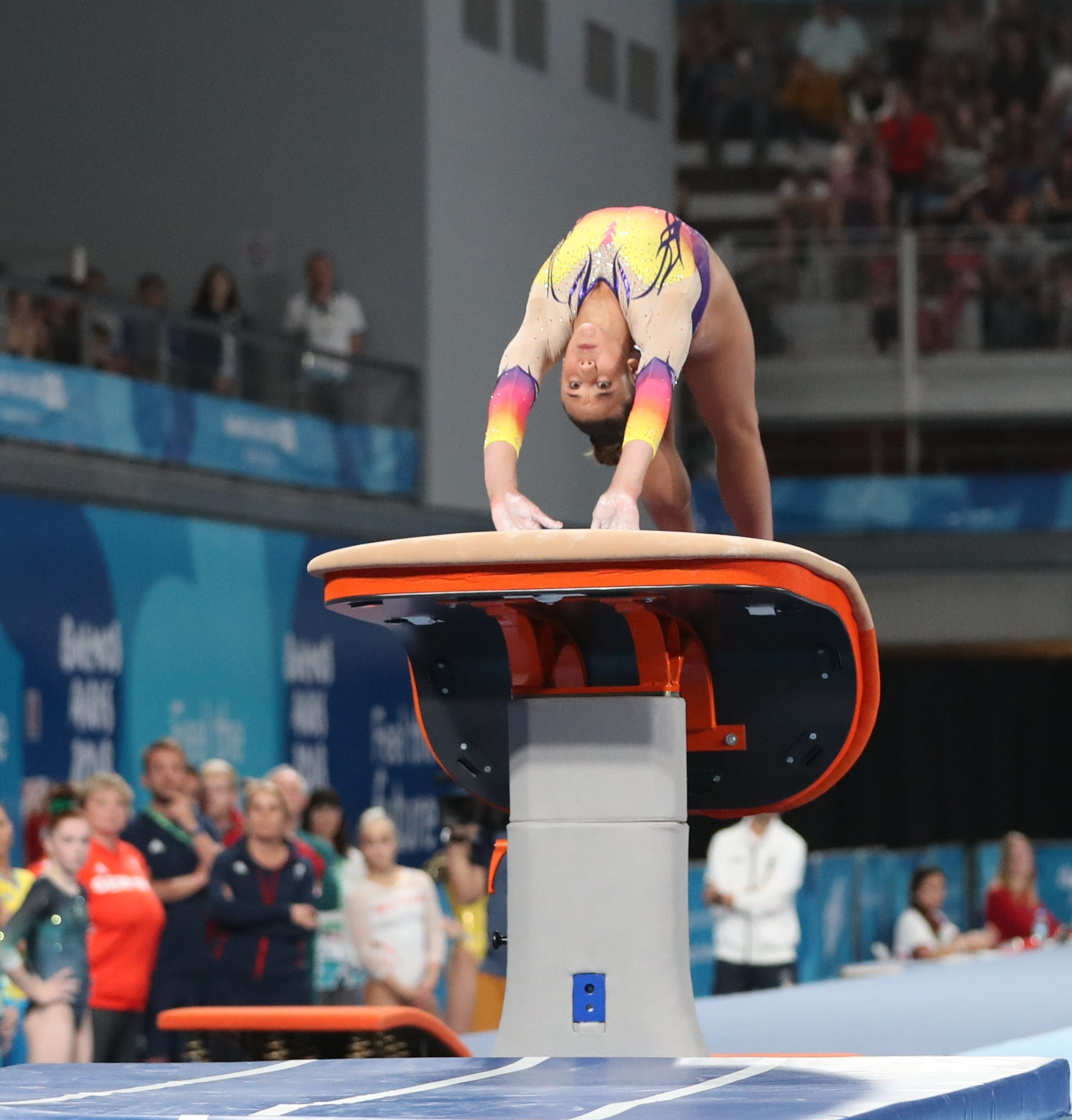
Amelie Morgan

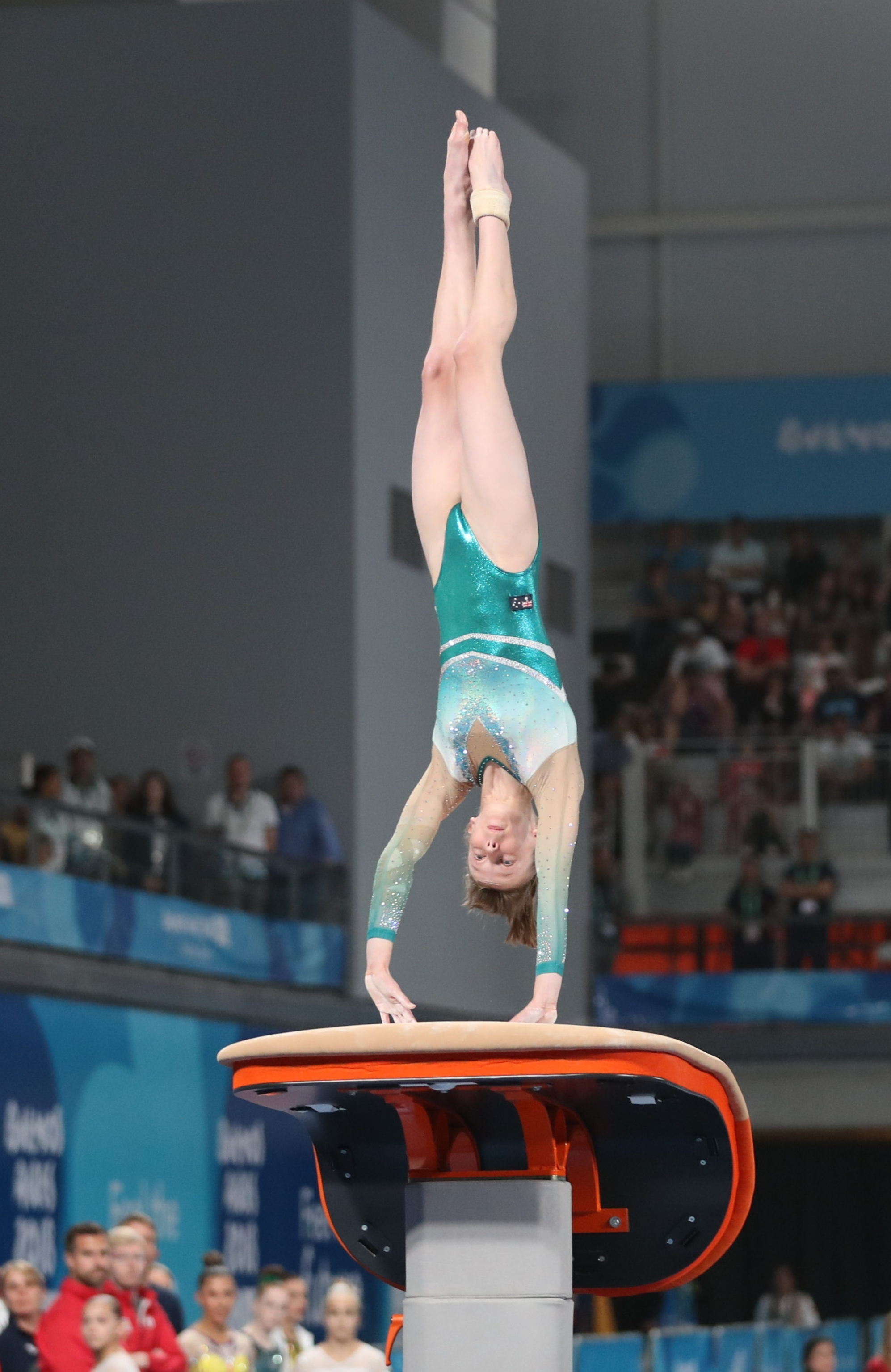
Kate Sayer

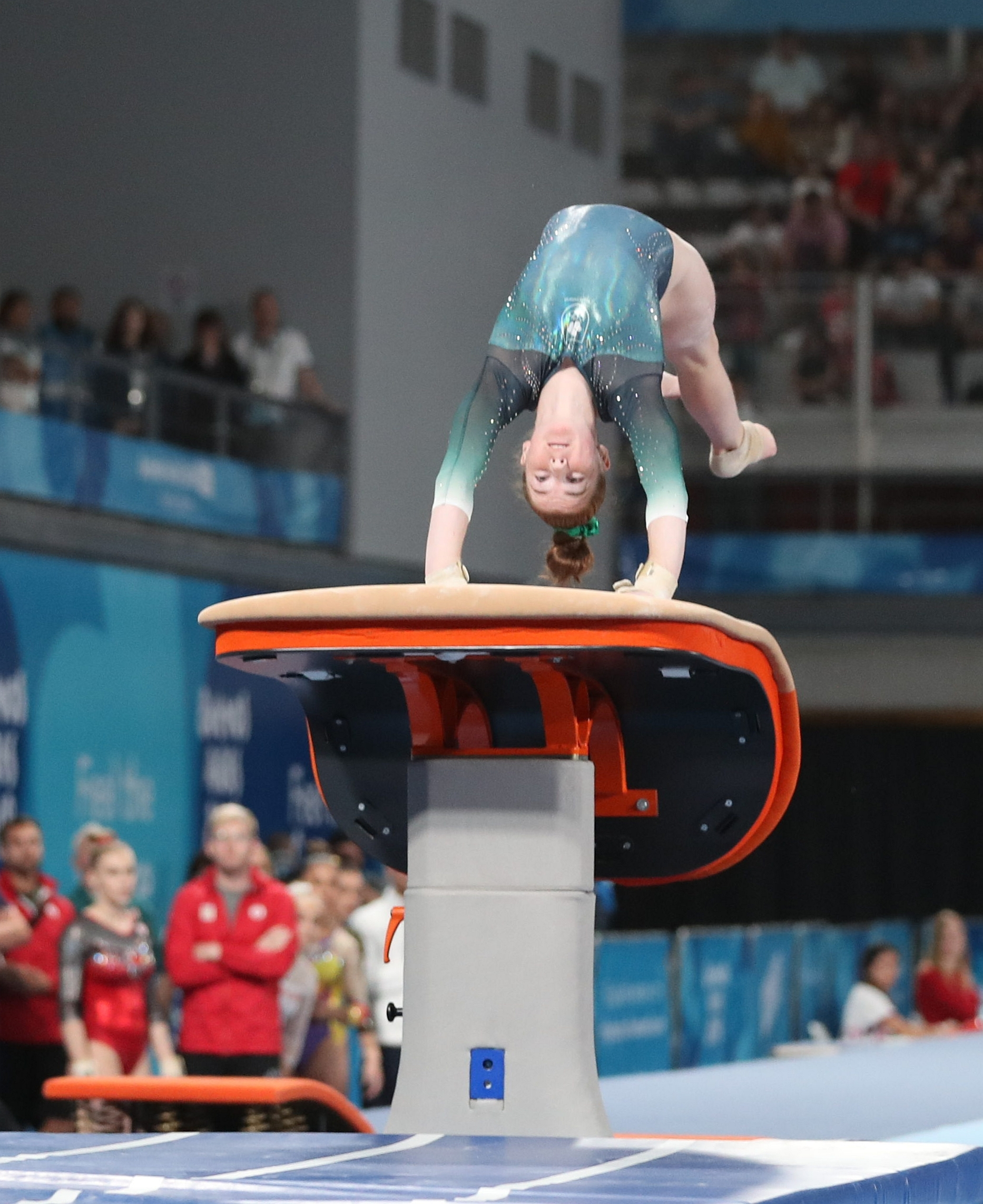
Emma Slevin
