= Lisa Zimmermann (gymnast) =

German artistic gymnast

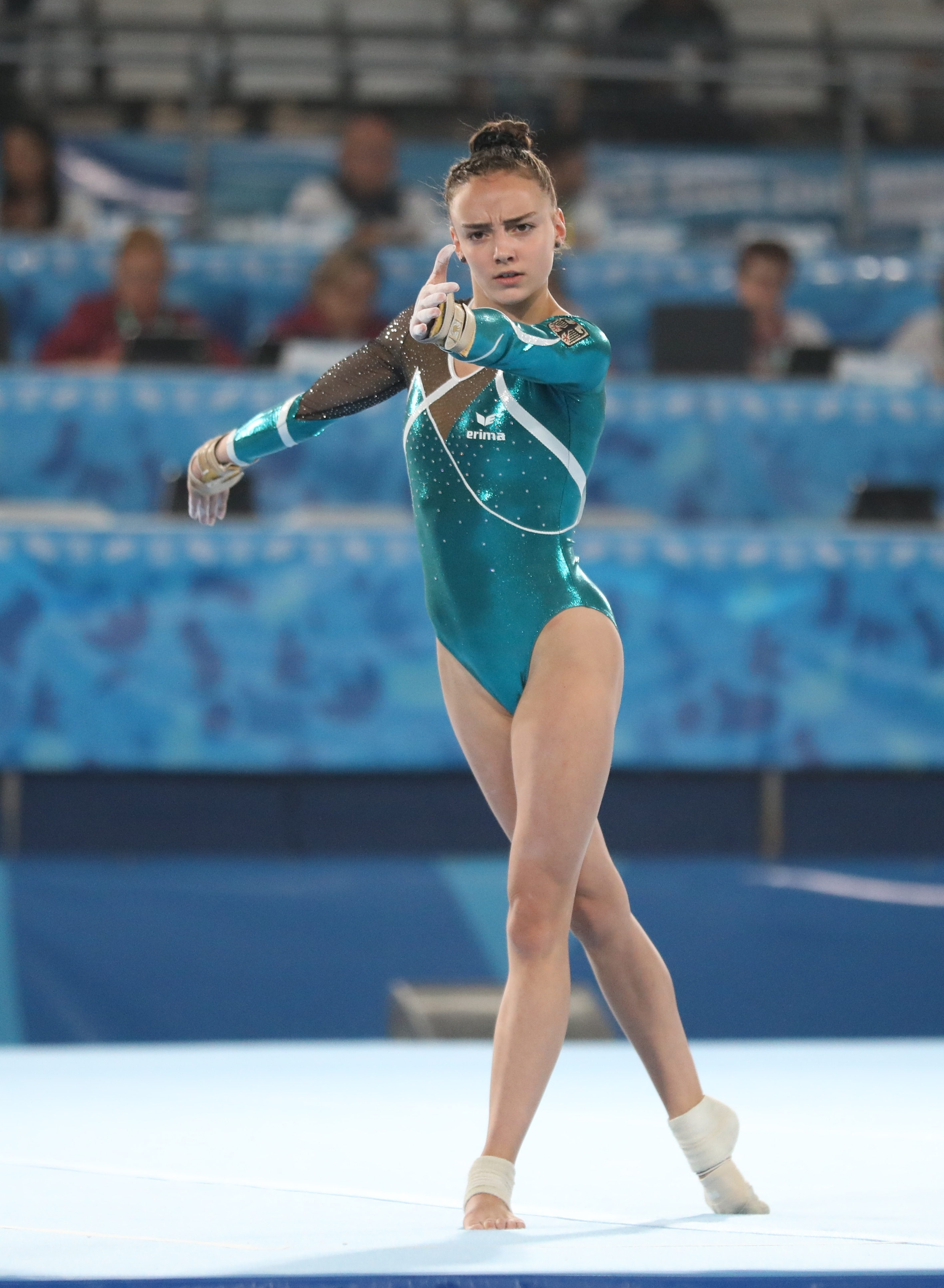
- Zimmermann at the 2018 Youth Olympic Games

Personal information
- Born: 13 February 2003 (age 23) Darmstadt, Hesse, Germany

Gymnastics career
- Discipline: Women's artistic gymnastics
- Country represented: Germany; (2017–22)
- Club: TuS 1861 Chemnitz-Altendorf
- Head coach: Gabriele Frehse
- Assistant coach: Johannes Schmidt
- Retired: 1 December 2022
Medal record
Artistic gymnastics
Representing Germany
Event	1st	2nd	3rd
FIG World Cup	0	0	2

Lisa Zimmermann (born 13 February 2003) is a retired German artistic gymnast. She represented Germany at the 2018 Youth Olympic Games.

== Early life ==
Zimmermann was born in Darmstadt in 2003. She trained in Chemnitz.

== Junior gymnastics career ==
=== 2016–2017 ===
In 2016 Zimmermann competed at both the German National Championships and the German Cup, where she placed sixth amongst the other thirteen year olds and nineteenth respectively.

In 2017 Zimmermann competed at the German National Championships where she once again placed sixth in the all-around; however she won the silver medal on both vault and balance beam, behind Emelie Petz.

=== 2018 ===
In May Zimmermann competed at the German Junior National Championships where she won the bronze medal in the all-around behind Emelie Petz and Sidney Hayn. Additionally she won the silver on vault and uneven bars, once again behind Petz, bronze on floor exercise behind Petz and Hayn, and placed sixth on balance beam. In June she competed at the Youth Olympic Qualifier where she placed thirteenth. The following month Zimmermann competed at a friendly competition in Pieve di Soligo where she helped Germany place fourth and individually she placed twentieth in the all-around.

In August Zimmermann was selected to represent Germany at the 2018 European Championships alongside Petz, Emma Malewski, Lara Hinsberger, and Leonie Papke. Together they finished seventh in the team final. Individually Zimmermann was the second reserve for the vault final. Later in the year Zimmermann was selected to represent Germany at the 2018 Youth Olympic Games. While there she qualified to the all-around final and the vault final and was the first reserve for the uneven bars, balance beam, and floor exercise finals. She ended up placing twelfth in the all-around final and fifth in the vault final.

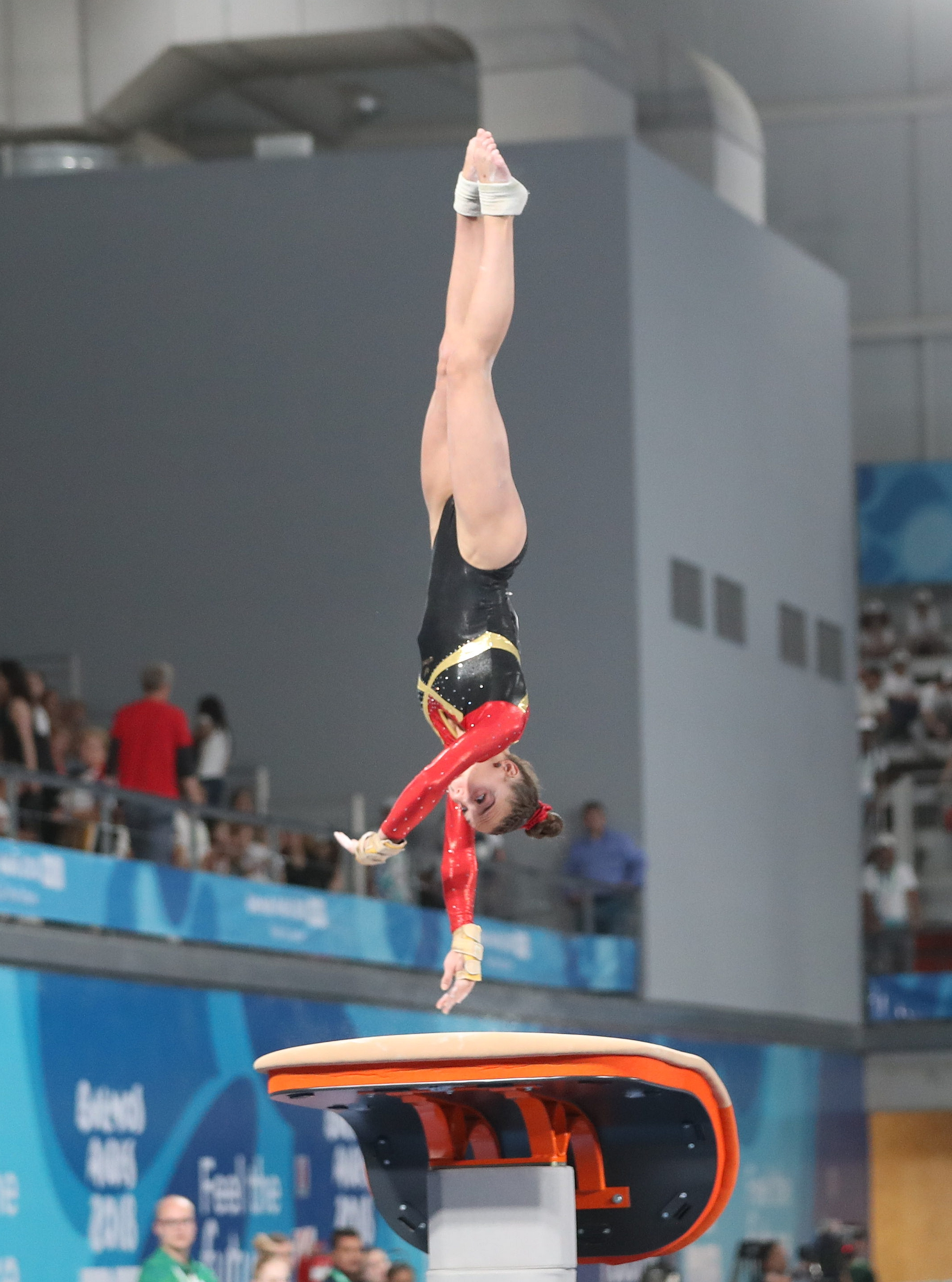
Vault qualification

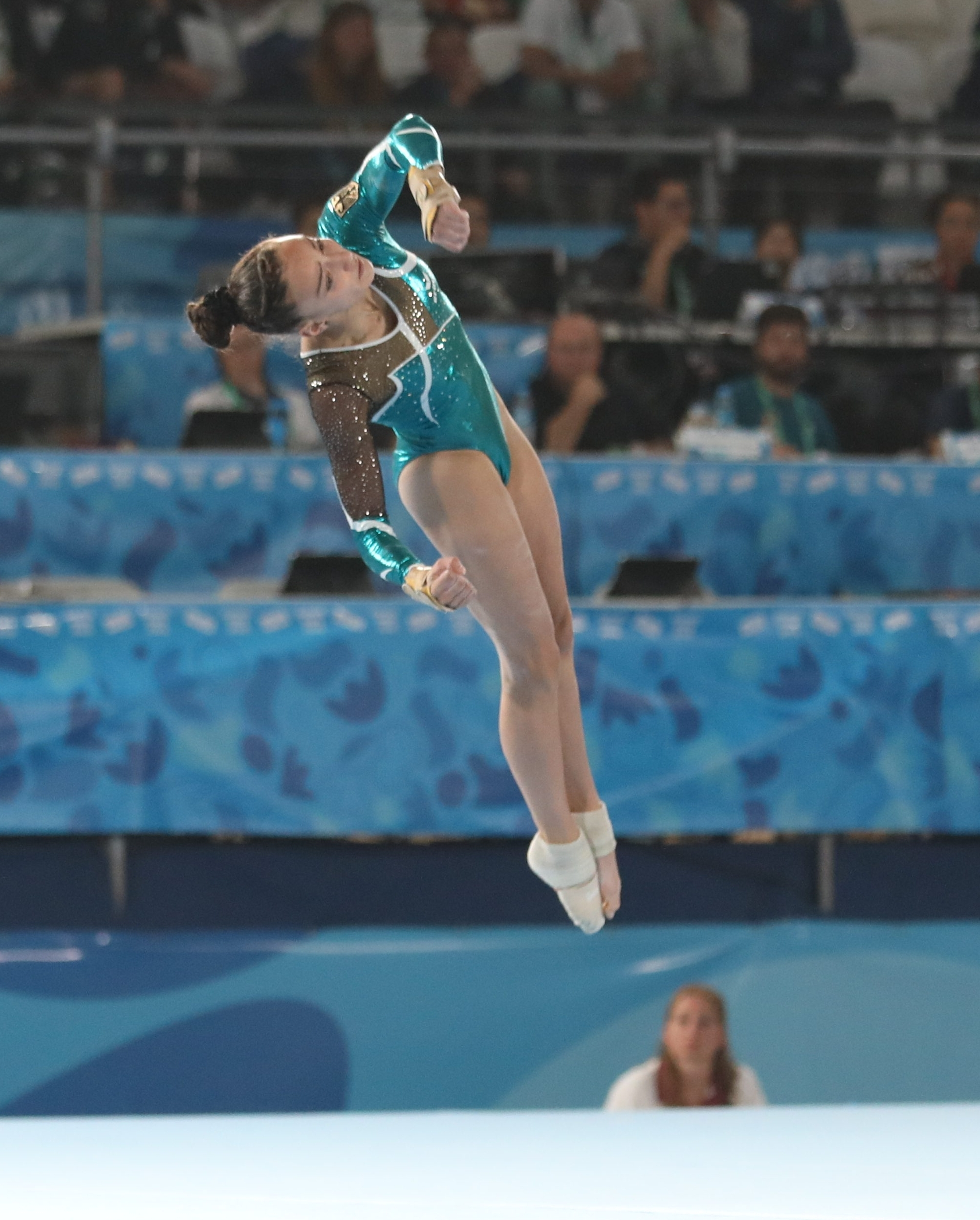
All-Around Final

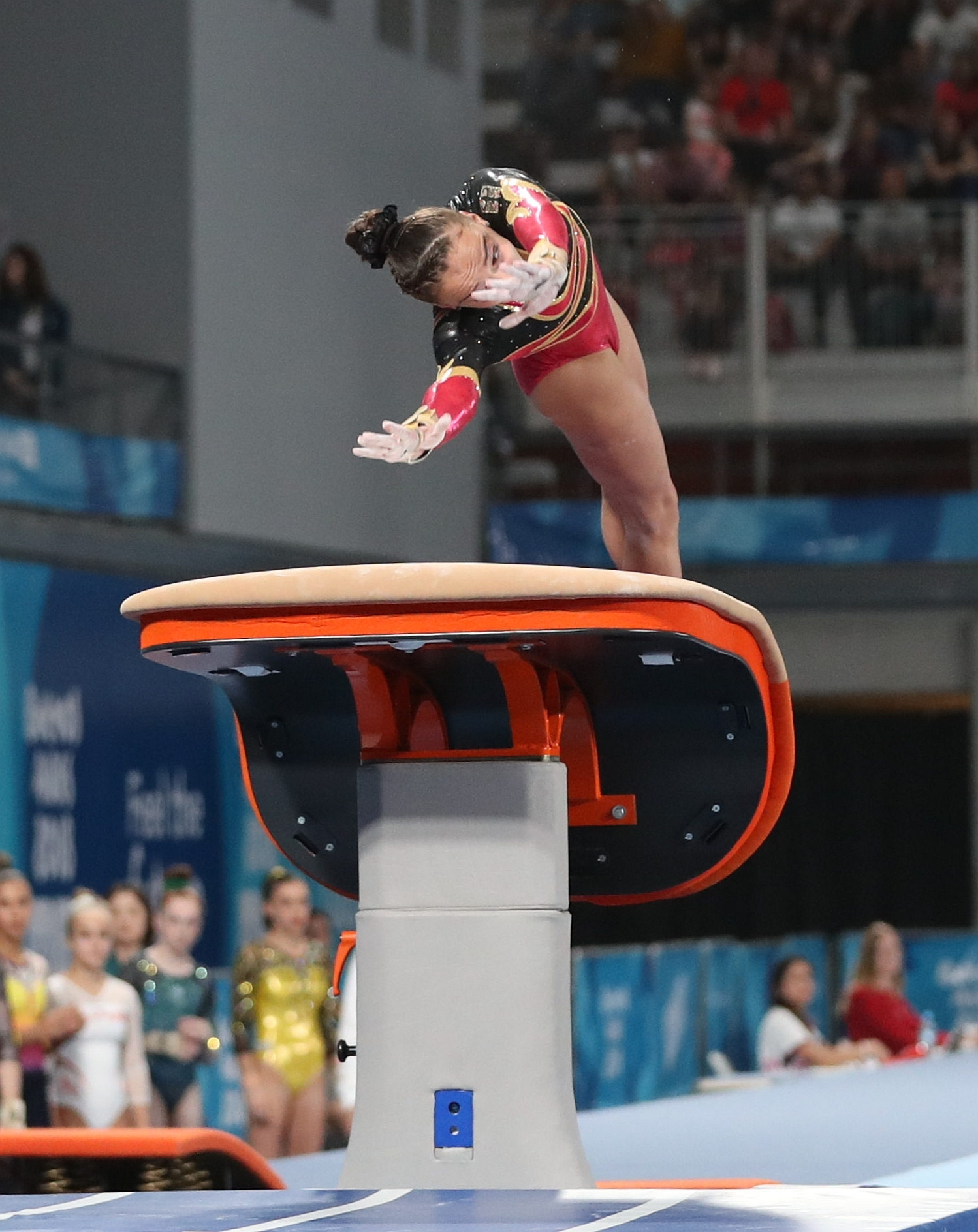
Vault Final

Zimmermann at the 2018 Youth Olympics

== Senior gymnastics career ==
=== 2019 ===
In 2019 Zimmermann turned senior. She made her debut at the DTB Team Challenge where she placed eighth in the all-around and helped Germany finish fifth as a team. The following month she competed at the European Championships where she placed twenty-fourth in the all-around. In June Zimmermann competed at the Flanders International Team Challenge in Ghent, Belgium alongside Kim Ruoff, Lisa Schöniger, and Isabelle Stingl. Together they placed seventh in the team final. Individually Zimmermann placed twentieth in the all-around.

In August Zimmermann competed at her first German National Championships as a senior elite where she placed eleventh in the all-around and third on vault behind Sarah Voss and Emelie Petz. As a result, Zimmermann qualified to compete at the World Trials for a chance to make the German team that would compete at the 2019 World Championships. At the World Trials she finished seventh in the all-around but recorded the second highest balance beam score. In September Zimmermann competed at a friendly competition in Worms, Germany where she helped Germany finish first as a team and individually she finished eighteenth in the all-around.

Zimmermann ended the season competing at the Cottbus World Cup where she qualified to the vault and balance beam event finals. During event finals she placed seventh and sixth respectively.

=== 2020 ===
While most competitions were canceled or postponed due to the COVID-19 pandemic, the Szombathely Challenge Cup was held in October which Zimmermann competed at. She qualified to the vault, uneven bars, and floor exercise finals. She finished fifth in the vault event final but won bronze on both uneven bars and floor exercise.

=== 2022 ===
Zimmermann announced her retirement from the sport on 1 December 2022 via Instagram.

== Competitive history ==
Year	Event	Team	AA	VT	UB	BB	FX
Junior
2016	National Championships		6	6		6	
2016	German Cup		19				
2017	National Championships		6	2nd place, silver medalist(s)		2nd place, silver medalist(s)	
2018	National Championships		3rd place, bronze medalist(s)	2nd place, silver medalist(s)	2nd place, silver medalist(s)	6	3rd place, bronze medalist(s)
2018	Youth Olympic Qualifier		13				
2018	Pieve di Soligo Friendly	4	20				
2018	European Championships	7		R2			
2018	Youth Olympic Games		12	5	R1	R1	R1
Senior
2019	DTB Team Challenge	5	8				
2019	European Championships		24				
2019	FIT Challenge	7	20				
2019	National Championships		11	3rd place, bronze medalist(s)			
2019	German World Trials		7				
2019	Worms Friendly	1st place, gold medalist(s)	18				
2019	Cottbus World Cup			7		6	R1
2020	Szombathely World Cup			5	3rd place, bronze medalist(s)	R2	3rd place, bronze medalist(s)
2021	National Championships		7	2nd place, silver medalist(s)	4		1st place, gold medalist(s)
