= Kate Sayer =

Australian artistic gymnast

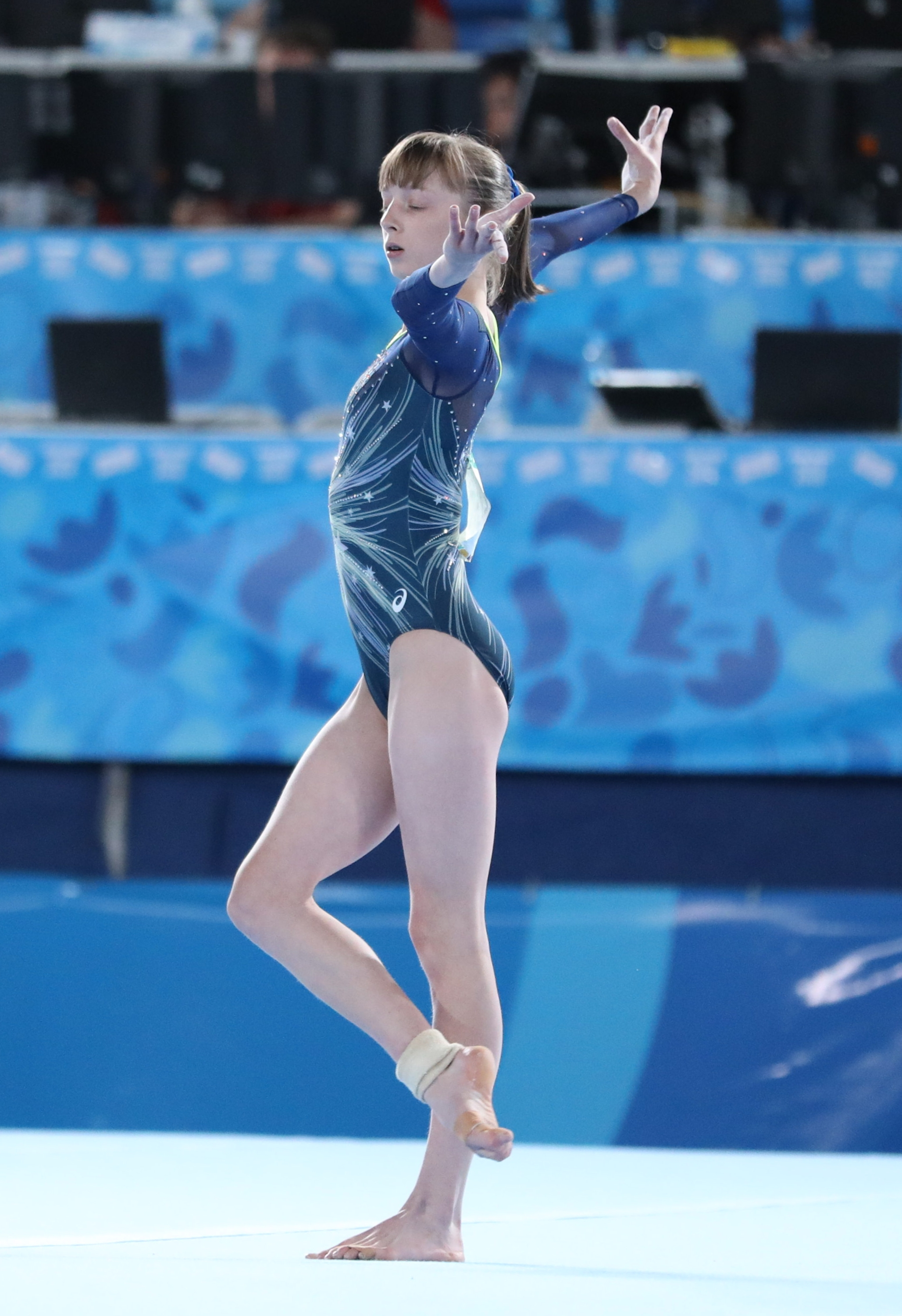
- Sayer at the 2018 Youth Olympic Games

Personal information
- Nickname: KitKat
- Born: 8 March 2003 (age 23) South Brisbane, Queensland, Australia

Gymnastics career
- Discipline: Women's artistic gymnastics
- Country represented: Australia; (2017–present)
- Club: Queensland High Performance Centre
- Head coach: Mikhail Barabach
- Assistant coach: Tao Xiaomin
Medal record
Artistic gymnastics
Representing Australia
Oceania Championships
Silver medal – second place	2024 Auckland	All-around
Pacific Rim Championships (Junior)
Bronze medal – third place	2018 Medellín	Team
Bronze medal – third place	2018 Medellín	Balance Beam

Kate Sayer (born 8 March 2003) is an Australian artistic gymnast and the 2018 Pacific Rim Gymnastics Championships junior bronze medallist on balance beam. She represented Australia at the 2018 Youth Olympic Games.

== Early life ==
Sayer was born in South Brisbane, Queensland. She began gymnastics when she was four years old.

== Gymnastics career ==
=== 2017–18 ===
Sayer competed at the 2017 Australian National Championships. She placed fifth in the Junior 14 All-Around Final and placed second on vault and uneven bars and fourth on balance beam.

In April 2018 Sayer was selected to compete at the Pacific Rim Championships. While there she helped Australia finish third in the team final behind the United States and Canada. She finished 14th in the all-around During event finals she won bronze on the balance beam behind Zoé Allaire-Bourgie of Canada and American Sunisa Lee. Additionally she placed seventh on vault and eighth on floor exercise. The following month Sayer competed at the Australian National Championships where she won the junior all-around competition.

In August Sayer was selected to represent Australia at the 2018 Summer Youth Olympics. In September she competed at the Australian Classic where she once again won the junior division title.

At the Youth Olympic Games in Buenos Aires Sayer qualified to the all-around, vault, and floor exercise finals. In the all-around final she placed eighth. During event finals she placed seventh and eighth respectively.

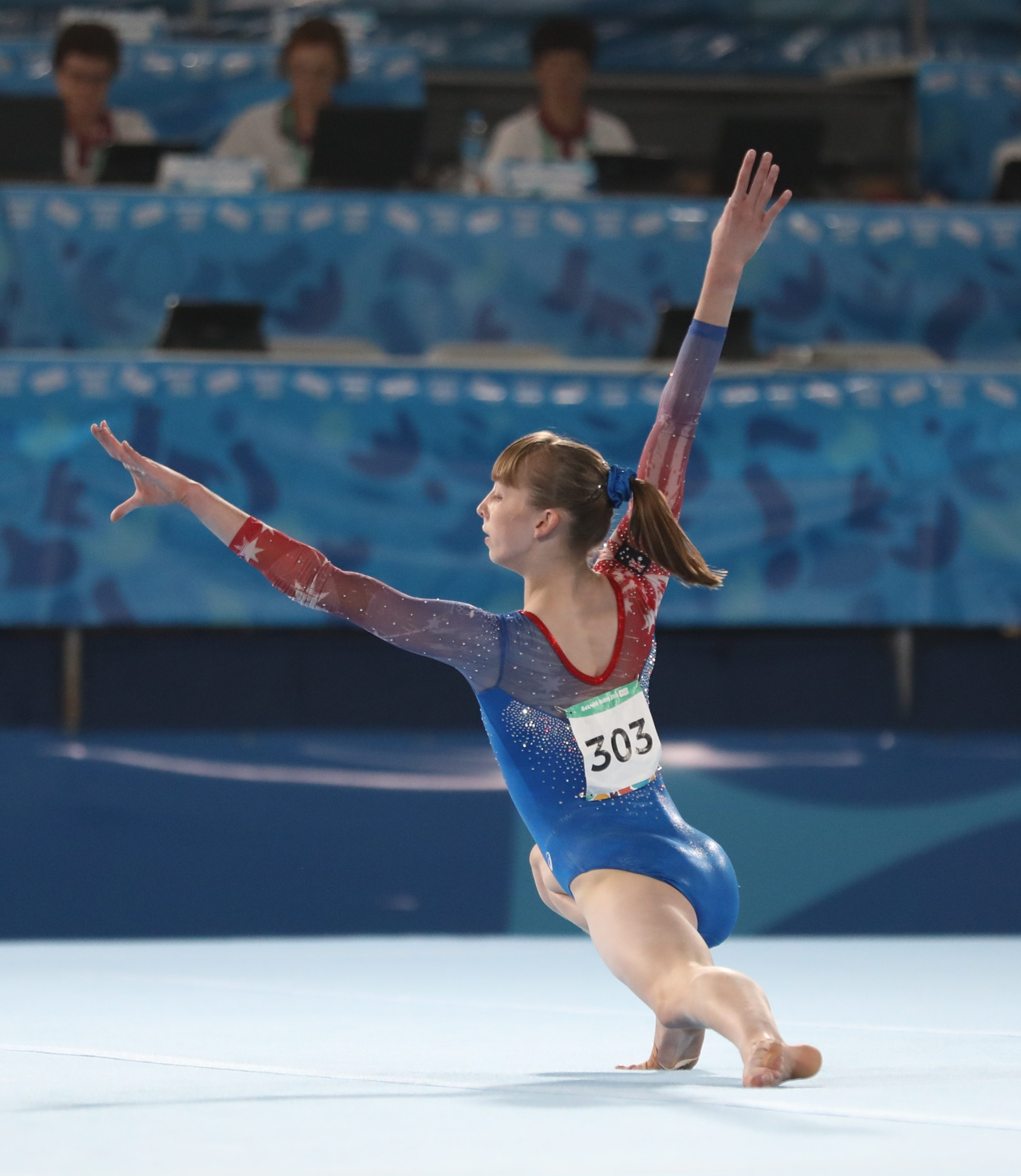
All-Around Final

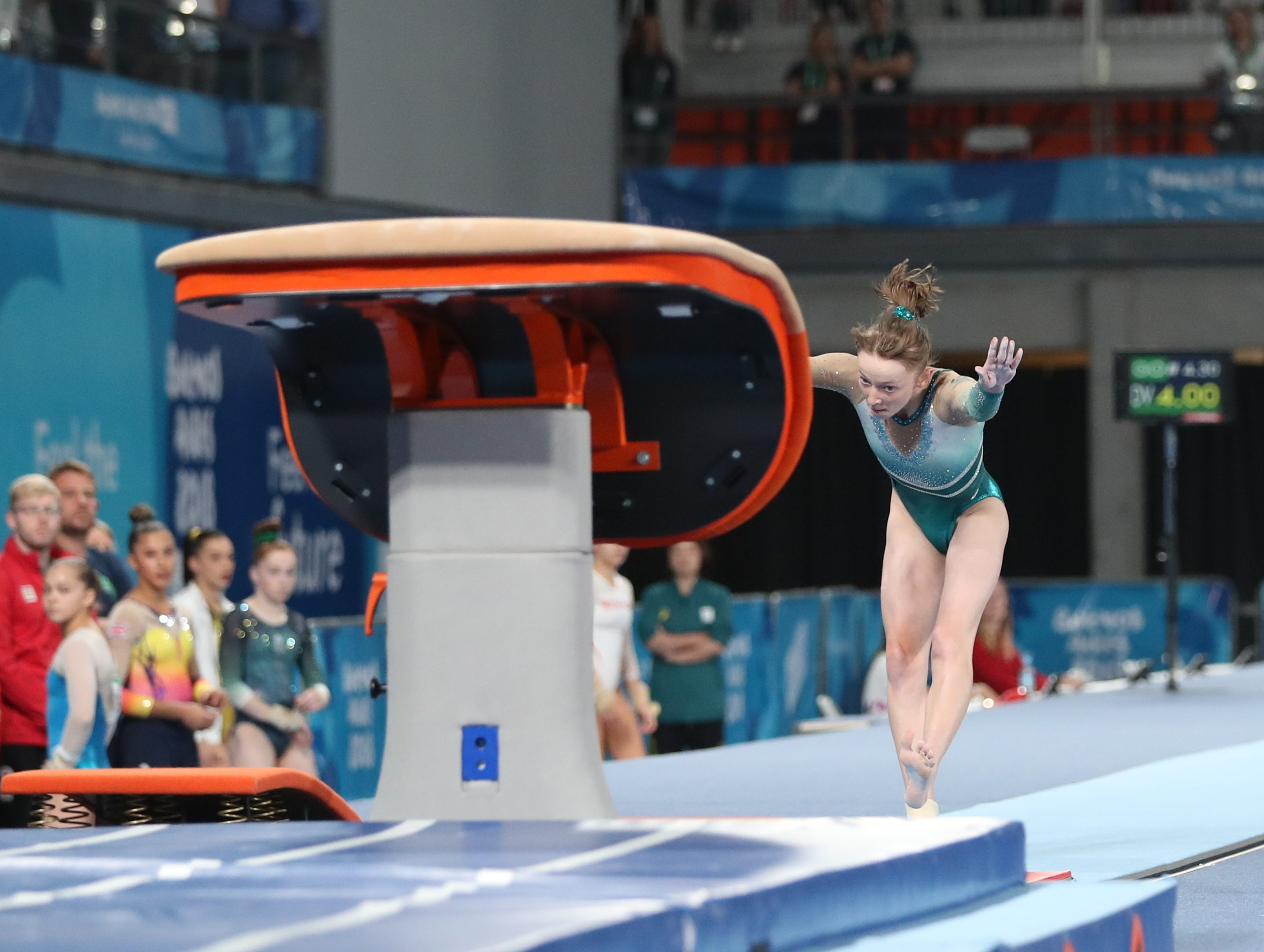
Vault Final

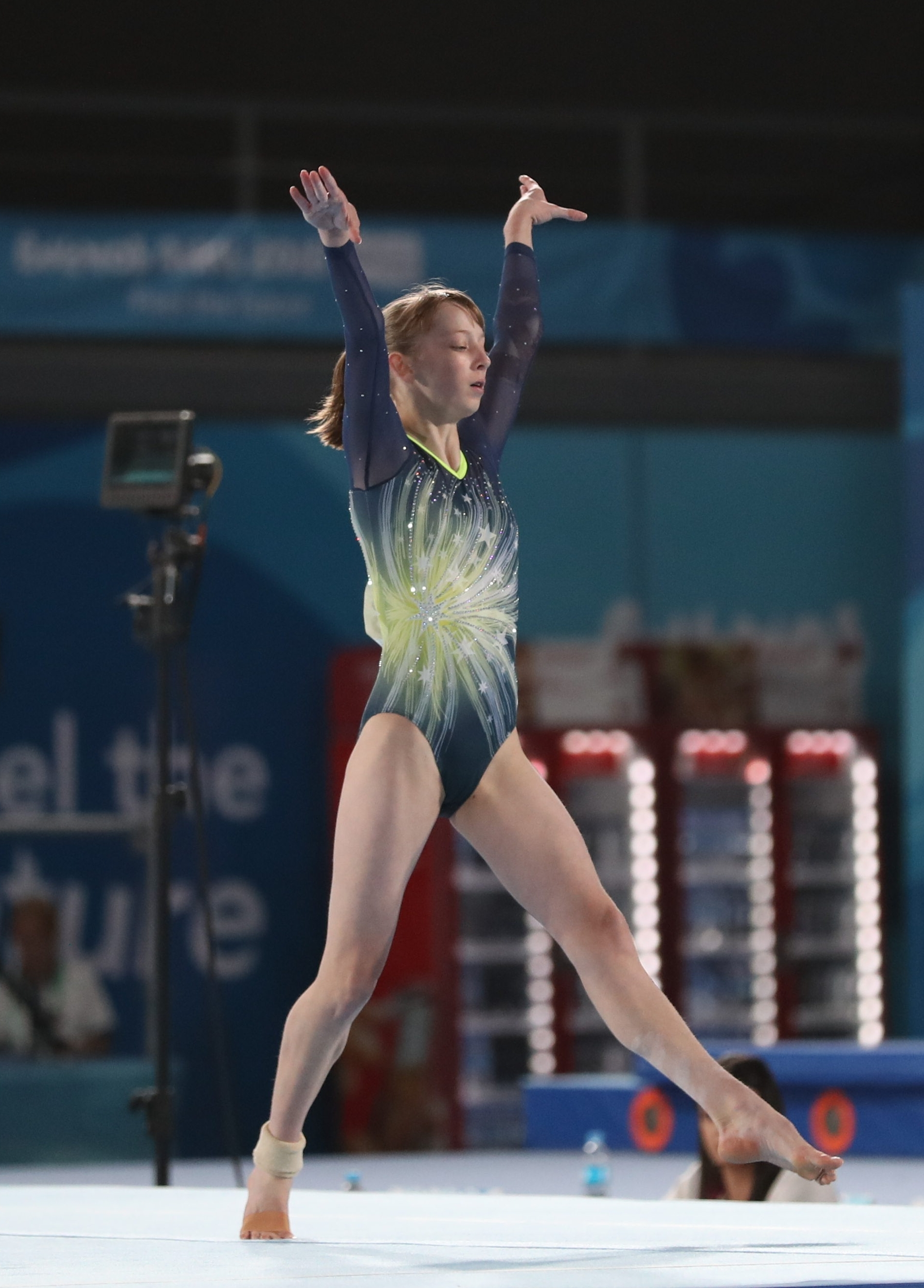
Floor Exercise Final

Sayer at the 2018 Youth Olympics

=== 2019 ===
In 2019, Sayer turned senior. She made her debut at the Melbourne World Cup where she only competed on floor exercise. She finished 9th in qualifications and was the first reserve for the final. In March she competed at the 2019 L'International Gymnix. She helped Australia win the bronze medal. Individually Sayer placed 17th in the all-around. In May she competed at the Australian National Championships where she finished 11th in the all-around. In September she competed at the Australian Classic where she finished 8th. Sayer was selected as the alternate to the team who would compete at the 2019 World Championships in Stuttgart.

== Eponymous skill ==
Apparatus	Name	Description	Difficulty (Note: Valid for the 2022–2024 Code of Points)	Added to the Code of Points
Uneven bars	Sayer	Clear pike circle backward on high bar with flight to clear support on low bar	C	2024 Oceania Championships

== Competitive history ==
Year	Event	Team	AA	VT	UB	BB	FX
Junior
2017	National Championships		5	2nd place, silver medalist(s)	2nd place, silver medalist(s)	4	
2018	Pacific Rim Championships	3rd place, bronze medalist(s)	14	7		3rd place, bronze medalist(s)	8
2018	Australian Championships		1st place, gold medalist(s)				
2018	Australian Classic		1st place, gold medalist(s)				
2018	Youth Olympic Games		8	7	R2		8
Senior
2019	Melbourne World Cup						R1
2019	International Gymnix	3rd place, bronze medalist(s)	17				
2019	Australian Championships		11				
2019	Australian Classic		8				
2021	Australian Championships		5				
2022	DTB Pokal Team Challenge	3rd place, bronze medalist(s)					
