= Amelie Morgan =

British artistic gymnast

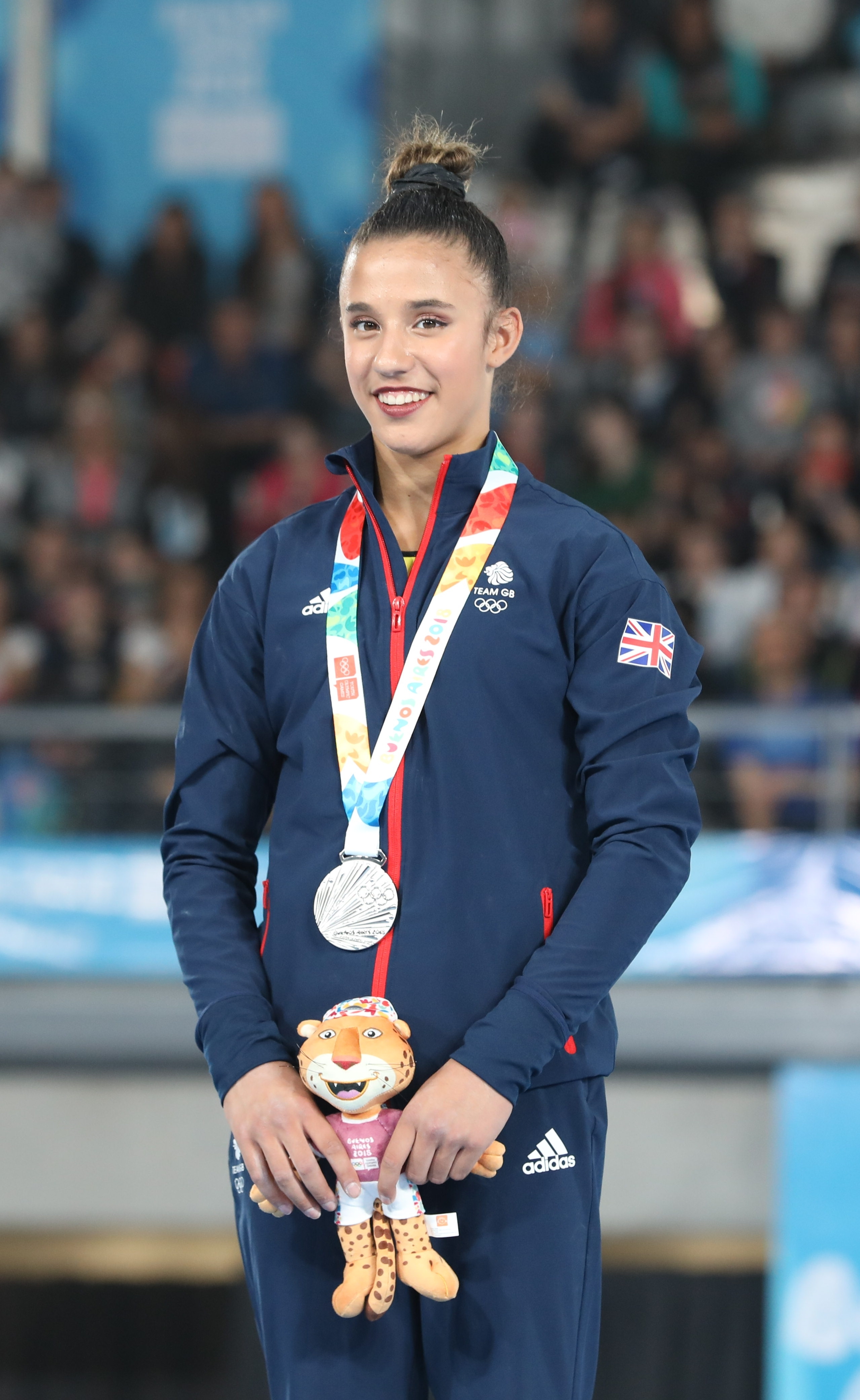
- Morgan at the 2018 Youth Olympics

Personal information
- Nickname: Am
- Born: 31 May 2003 (age 23) Slough, Berkshire, England, United Kingdom

Gymnastics career
- Discipline: Women's artistic gymnastics
- Country represented: (United Kingdom) Great Britain (2016–2021, 2024)
- College team: Utah Red Rocks (2022-2025)
- Club: The Academy (2017–2021); Slough (2010–17)
- Head coach: Liz Kincaid
- Former coach: Ellie Jones
- Retired: 24 April 2025
Medal record

Representing Great Britain
Olympic Games
Bronze medal – third place	2020 Tokyo	Team
European Championships
Bronze medal – third place	2021 Basel	Uneven Bars
Youth Olympic Games
Silver medal – second place	2018 Buenos Aires	All-around
Silver medal – second place	2018 Buenos Aires	Floor exercise
Bronze medal – third place	2018 Buenos Aires	Balance beam
Representing Utah Red Rocks
NCAA Championships
Bronze medal – third place	2022 Fort Worth	Team
Bronze medal – third place	2023 Fort Worth	Team
Bronze medal – third place	2024 Fort Worth	Team

Amelie Morgan (born 31 May 2003) is a British artistic gymnast. She represented Great Britain at the 2020 Summer Olympics and won a bronze medal in the team event. She is the 2021 European Championships bronze medallist on the uneven bars.

As a junior she won the silver medal in the all-around at the 2018 Youth Olympics, as well as a silver medal on floor exercise and a bronze on balance beam. At the 2018 Junior European Championships she won five medals (two silvers and three bronzes)—the most medals won by a British junior female gymnast at the European Championships.

Morgan competed for the Utah Red Rocks from 2021 to 2025, where the team had three third place finishes at the NCAA Championships as well as three Pac-12 Championships titles and one Big 12 Championship title.

== Early life ==
Morgan was born in Slough, Berkshire, in 2003. She has a twin brother. She joined Slough Gymnastics club when they first opened in 2010. In 2017 she transferred to The Academy of Gymnastics. In order to juggle her education with her 35-hour a week training schedule, Amelie was homeschooled through Wolsey Hall, Oxford for her IGCSEs. She then moved to St Katherine's School to study her A levels, where she achieved an A* and two Bs.

== Junior gymnastics career ==
=== 2008–2010 ===
Amelie started her gymnastics journey at Chiltern Gymnastics, based in Iver and later moved to Beaconsfield.

=== 2015–16 ===
Morgan began her gymnastics career in 2015, where she competed at the English Championships and finished second at the espoir level. In 2016 Morgan was selected to compete at the School Games, where she placed third in the all-around, on balance beam, and on floor exercise. Later that year she competed at the Olympic Hopes Cup where she placed second in the all-around behind Ana Padurariu of Canada.

=== 2017 ===
Morgan finished second at the British Championships behind Taeja James. In late June Morgan announced that she had verbally committed to attend the University of California, Berkeley on a gymnastics scholarship. In July Morgan competed at the European Youth Olympic Festival where she won bronze on balance beam behind Ksenia Klimenko of Russia and Asia D'Amato of Italy. In November Morgan competed at the Olympic Hopes Cup where she won gold in the all-around and on floor exercise and won silver on vault. Morgan ended 2017 competed at the Top Gym Tournament where she placed fifth in the all-around, fourth on beam, but won gold on floor exercise.

=== 2018 ===
Morgan won gold in the all-around at both the English Championships and the British Championships. She was selected to represent Great Britain at the 2018 European Championships. While there Morgan won a record 5 medals in the Junior competition – silver in the all-around and on balance beam, both behind Giorgia Villa of Italy, and bronze in the team final, vault (behind Asia D'Amato of Italy and Villa), and floor exercise (behind Ioana Stanciulescu of Romania and Villa). Later in the year Morgan was selected to represent Great Britain at the 2018 Youth Olympic Games. While there she won silver in the all-around and on floor exercise, once again behind Villa, and won bronze on balance beam behind Tang Xijing of China and Klimenko .

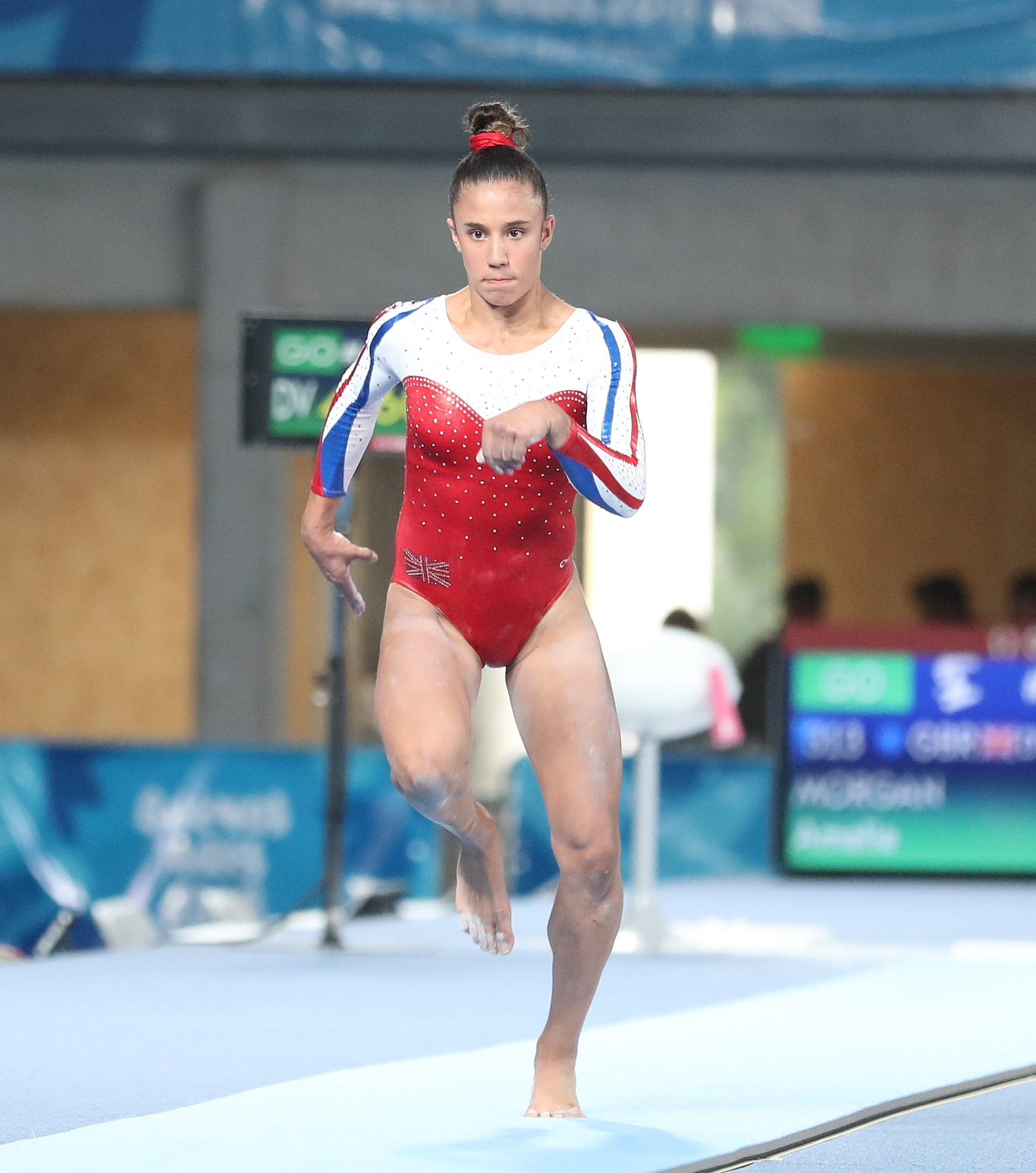
Vault qualification

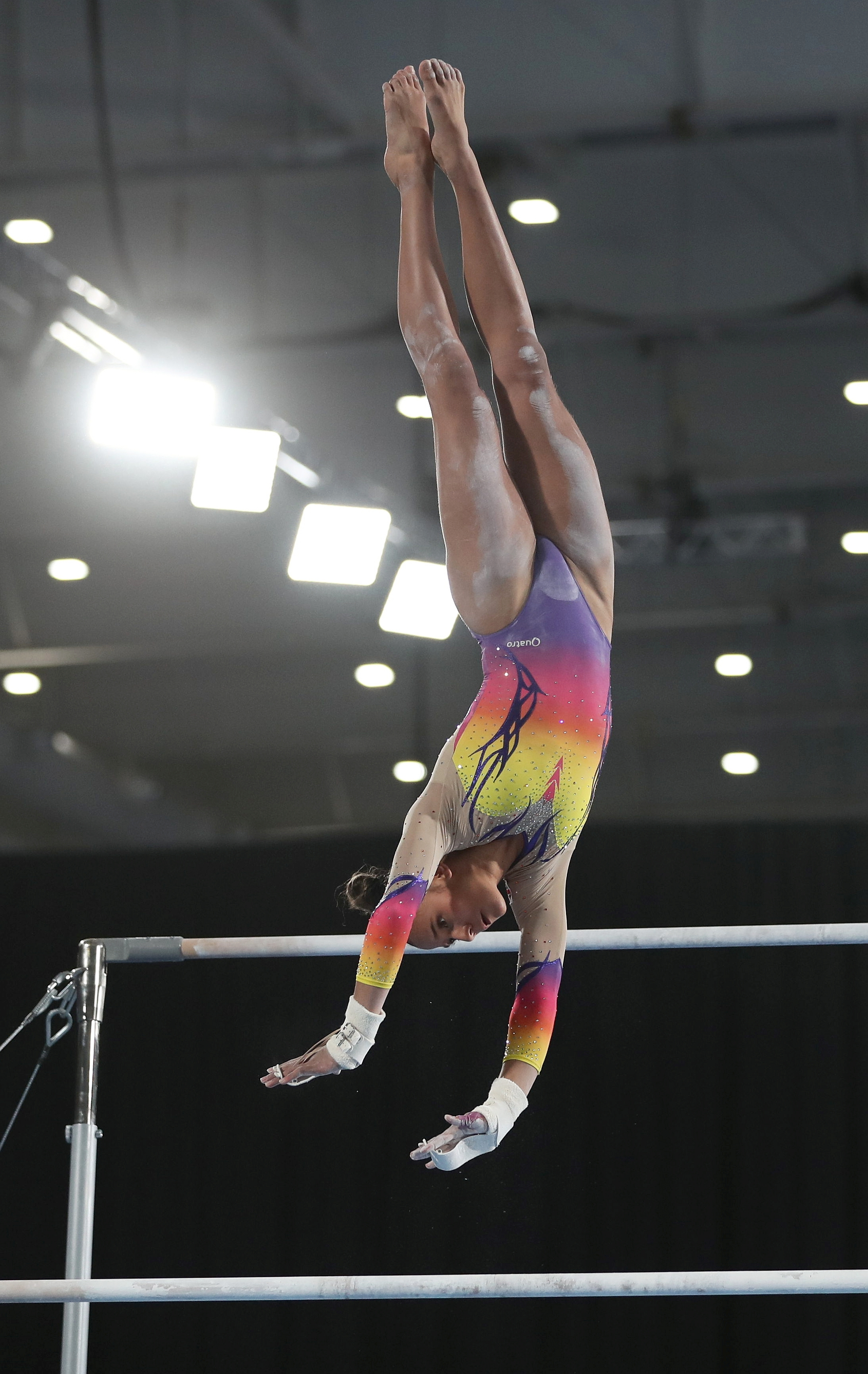
Uneven bars final

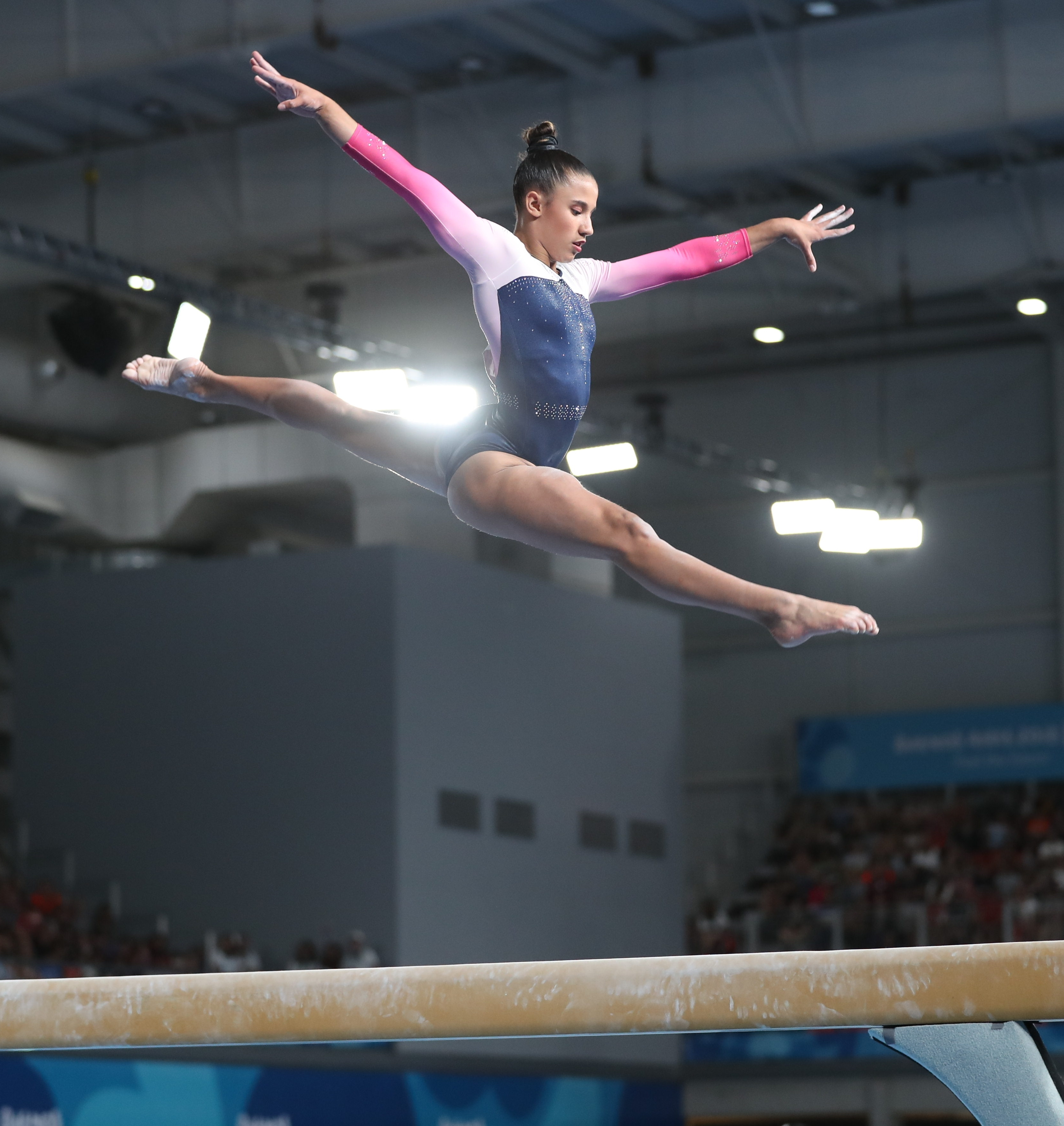
Balance beam final

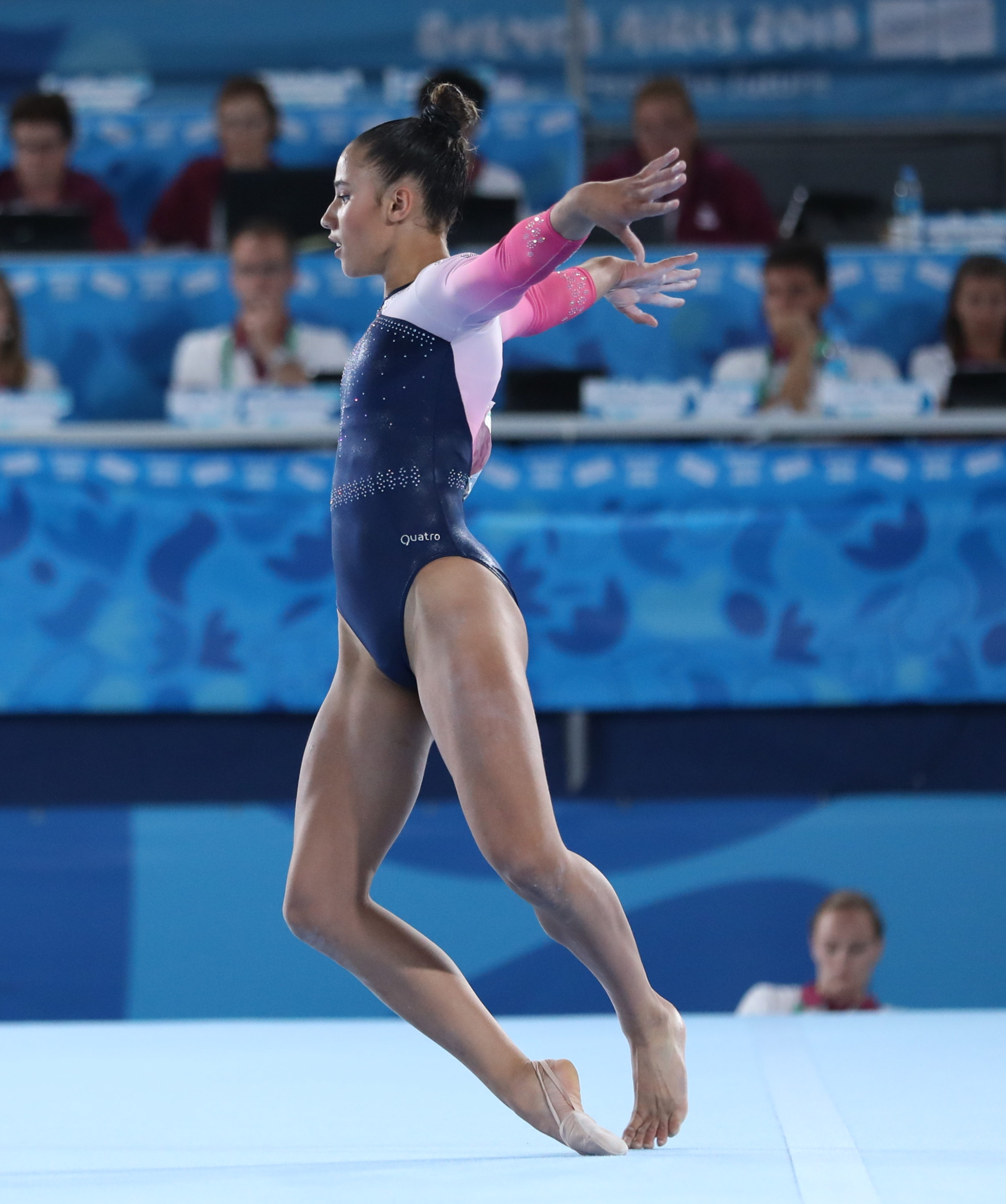
Floor exercise final

Morgan at the 2018 Youth Olympics

== Senior gymnastics career ==
=== 2019 ===
Morgan turned senior in 2019 and made her debut at the English Championships where she won gold in the all-around, finishing 1.75 points ahead of second place Kelly Simm. She was later selected to compete at the 2019 European Championships alongside Ellie Downie, Alice Kinsella, and Claudia Fragapane. Morgan competed at the British Championships and won bronze in the all-around, on uneven bars, and on balance beam. She placed fourth on floor exercise. At the European Championships Morgan finished fifth in the all-around qualification but did not advance to the final due to teammates Kinsella and Downie scoring higher. Morgan was also a reserve for the bars and beam final. Just after the European Championships Morgan sustained an injury. She healed in time for the 2019 World Championships in Stuttgart as travelling reserve but she re-injured herself and Kelly Simm took her place. In November Morgan made her international comeback at the Cottbus World Cup in Germany. She qualified to the uneven bars final where she scored 13.766 and placed seventh.

=== 2020 ===
In January it was announced that Morgan would represent Great Britain at the American Cup, taking place on March 7. However, due to injury she was replaced by Jennifer Gadirova.

=== 2021 ===
In April Morgan was selected to represent Great Britain at the European Championships alongside Jessica Gadirova, Jennifer Gadirova (later replaced by Phoebe Jakubczyk), and Alice Kinsella. While there she qualified to the all-around final in 5th place and the uneven bars, and balance beam event finals in 7th and 3rd place respectively. During the all-around final Morgan finished in fourth place behind Russians Viktoria Listunova and Angelina Melnikova and teammate Gadirova. She won the bronze in the uneven bars final behind Melnikova and Vladislava Urazova. In the beam final, Morgan placed 4th due to a mistake on her wolf turn.

On 7 June, Morgan was selected to represent Great Britain at the 2020 Summer Olympics alongside Jennifer Gadirova, Jessica Gadirova, and Alice Kinsella.

At the Olympic Games Morgan did not qualify for any individual event finals; however Great Britain qualified for the team final. During the team final Morgan competed on uneven bars and balance beam, helping Great Britain win the bronze medal, their first Olympic team medal in 93 years.

== Collegiate gymnastics career ==
=== 2022 season ===
In July Morgan announced plans to switch NCAA commitments from the University of California, Berkeley to the University of Utah. In August she moved to Salt Lake City, Utah to join the University of Utah gymnastics team for the 2022 season as a part of their freshman class alongside Olympic silver medallist Grace McCallum, Kara Eaker, and Sage Thompson.

Morgan made her NCAA debut at the Best of Utah meet, against BYU, Southern Utah, and Utah State, where she competed on uneven bars and balance beam and scored a 9.825 and a 9.875 respectively, to help Utah win. She was subsequently named as the Pac-12 Freshman of the week. Morgan was the leadoff on bars and beam in every meet during her freshman season and hit 32-32 routine with season highs of 9.925 on bars at California and 9.95 on beam at Washington.

At the Pac-12 Conference Championships Morgan scored a 9.900 on bars and 9.925 on beam to help Utah become conference champions. The Red Rocks progressed to the 2022 NCAA National Championships where they placed third, with Morgan contributing a 9.900 on bars and 9.875 on beam.

=== 2023 season ===
As a sophomore Morgan retained her leadoff spot on beam and bars, hitting 28-28 routines with season highs of 9.925 on both apparatus. The Red Rocks retained their title at the 2023 Pac-12 Conference Championships where Morgan posted a 9.875 on bars and 9.90 on beam. At the 2023 NCAA National Championships she scored 9.850 on bars and 9.9125 on beams helping Utah place third.

=== 2024 season ===
In her junior year Morgan earned first career win on bars with a 9.950 at the Best of Utah meet, against BYU, Southern Utah, and Utah State. She was subsequently named Pac-12 Specialist of the Week. Morgan started on beam in 11-of-16 competitions, competed bars in 12 meets, and vault 3 times with season highs of 9.900 on vault and 9.950 on bars and beam.

Morgan won her third Pac-12 Conference Championships contributing 9.9250 on bars and her third bronze medal at the 2024 NCAA National Championships, posting a 9.8750 on bars and 9.9125 on beam.

=== 2025 season ===
Ahead of Morgan's senior year, Utah announced they would be moving to the Big 12 Conference. Morgan won her first Big 12 Conference Championship scoring a 9.875 on bars and beam. At the 2025 NCAA Championships Utah upset last years NCAA champions LSU to advance to Four on the Floor. At the final the Red Rocks ultimately placed fourth.

Morgan announced her retirement from gymnastics on 24 April 2025.

=== Regular season rankings ===
Season	All-Around	Vault	Uneven Bars	Balance Beam	Floor Exercise
2022	N/A	N/A	52nd	25th	N/A
2023	N/A	N/A	89th	91st	N/A
2024	N/A	N/A	55th	100th	N/A
2025	N/A	189th	45th	39th	N/A

== Competitive history ==
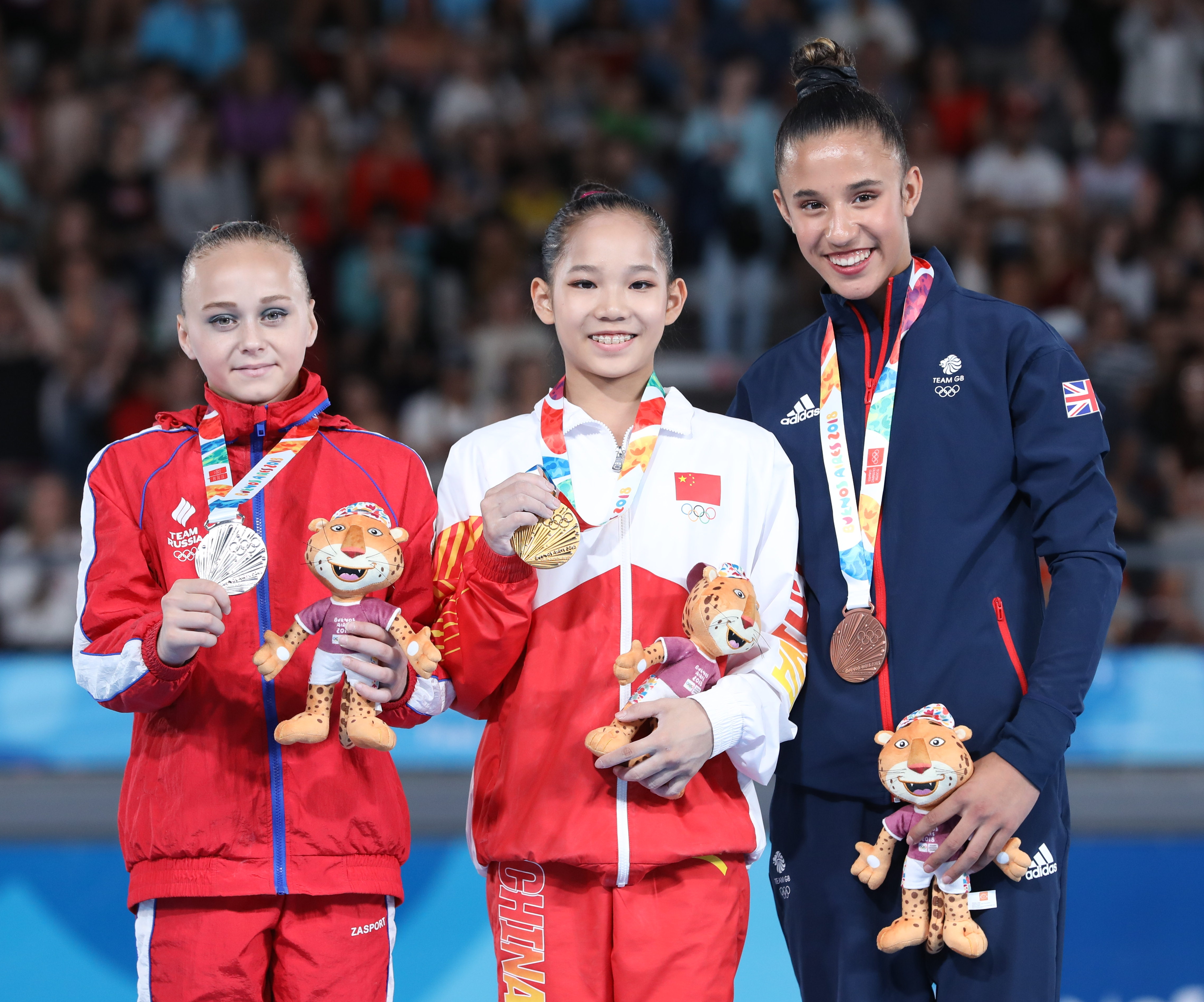
Morgan (right) on the balance beam podium at the 2018 Youth Olympic Games

Competitive history of Amelie Morgan at the junior level
Year	Event	Team	AA	VT	UB	BB	FX
2015	English Championships		2nd place, silver medalist(s)			1st place, gold medalist(s)	
2016	School Games		3rd place, bronze medalist(s)	4	6	3rd place, bronze medalist(s)	3rd place, bronze medalist(s)
2016	Olympic Hopes Cup	2nd place, silver medalist(s)	2nd place, silver medalist(s)	4	6	5	3rd place, bronze medalist(s)
2017	British Championships		2nd place, silver medalist(s)	2nd place, silver medalist(s)	2nd place, silver medalist(s)	1st place, gold medalist(s)	7
2017	German Junior Friendly	3rd place, bronze medalist(s)	11				
2017	Euro Youth Olympic Festival	5	7			3rd place, bronze medalist(s)	5
2017	British Team Championships		2nd place, silver medalist(s)				
2017	Olympic Hopes Cup		1st place, gold medalist(s)	2nd place, silver medalist(s)		4	1st place, gold medalist(s)
2017	Top Gym Tournament	2nd place, silver medalist(s)	1			4	1st place, gold medalist(s)
2018	English Championships		1st place, gold medalist(s)				
2018	British Championships		1st place, gold medalist(s)	1st place, gold medalist(s)	1st place, gold medalist(s)	3rd place, bronze medalist(s)	1st place, gold medalist(s)
2018	Youth Olympic Games Qualifier		6				
2018	Pieve di Soligo Friendly	3rd place, bronze medalist(s)	8				
2018	European Championships	3rd place, bronze medalist(s)	2nd place, silver medalist(s)	3rd place, bronze medalist(s)		2nd place, silver medalist(s)	3rd place, bronze medalist(s)
2018	British Team Championships		1st place, gold medalist(s)				
2018	Youth Olympic Games		2nd place, silver medalist(s)	6	4	3rd place, bronze medalist(s)	2nd place, silver medalist(s)

Competitive history of Amelie Morgan at the senior level
Year	Event	Team	AA	VT	UB	BB	FX
2019	English Championships		1st place, gold medalist(s)				
2019	British Championships		3rd place, bronze medalist(s)		3rd place, bronze medalist(s)	3rd place, bronze medalist(s)	4
2019	European Championships				R2	R3	
2019	Cottbus World Cup				7	R1	
2021
2021	European Championships		4		3rd place, bronze medalist(s)	4	
2021	Olympic Games	3rd place, bronze medalist(s)					
2024	English Championships		3rd place, bronze medalist(s)		5	3rd place, bronze medalist(s)	4

Competitive history of Amelie Morgan at the NCAA level
Year	Event	Team	AA	VT	UB	BB	FX
2022	PAC-12 Championships	1st place, gold medalist(s)			6	5	
2022	NCAA Championships	3rd place, bronze medalist(s)			24	19	
2023	PAC-12 Championships	1st place, gold medalist(s)					
2023	NCAA Championships	3rd place, bronze medalist(s)					
2024	PAC-12 Championships	1st place, gold medalist(s)					
2024	NCAA Championships	3rd place, bronze medalist(s)					
2025	Big12 Championships	1st place, gold medalist(s)					
2025	NCAA Championships	4					

== Media appearances ==
Morgan first appeared in the CBBC documentary series Gym Stars in 2018 and became one of its leading contributors alongside Phoebe Jakubczyk. She returned for Series 2, which began airing in April 2019 and Series 3 which began airing in March 2020.

== Selected competitive skills ==
Apparatus	Name	Description	Difficulty	Performed
Vault	Baitova	Yurchenko entry, laid out salto backwards with 2 twists	5.4	2018
Uneven bars	Piked Jaeger Van Leeuwen Bhardwaj Ricna	Reverse grip swing to pike salto forwards to catch high bar Toe on Shaposhonikova transition to the high bar with 1/2 twists to the High Bar Pak salto with 1/1 twist to transition down to the low bar Stalder to straddle Tkachev to catch the high bar	E E E E	2017 2018 2018 2019
Balance beam				
