= Gymnastics at the 2018 Summer Youth Olympics – Girls' balance beam =

Women's balance beam at the III Summer Youth Olympic Games
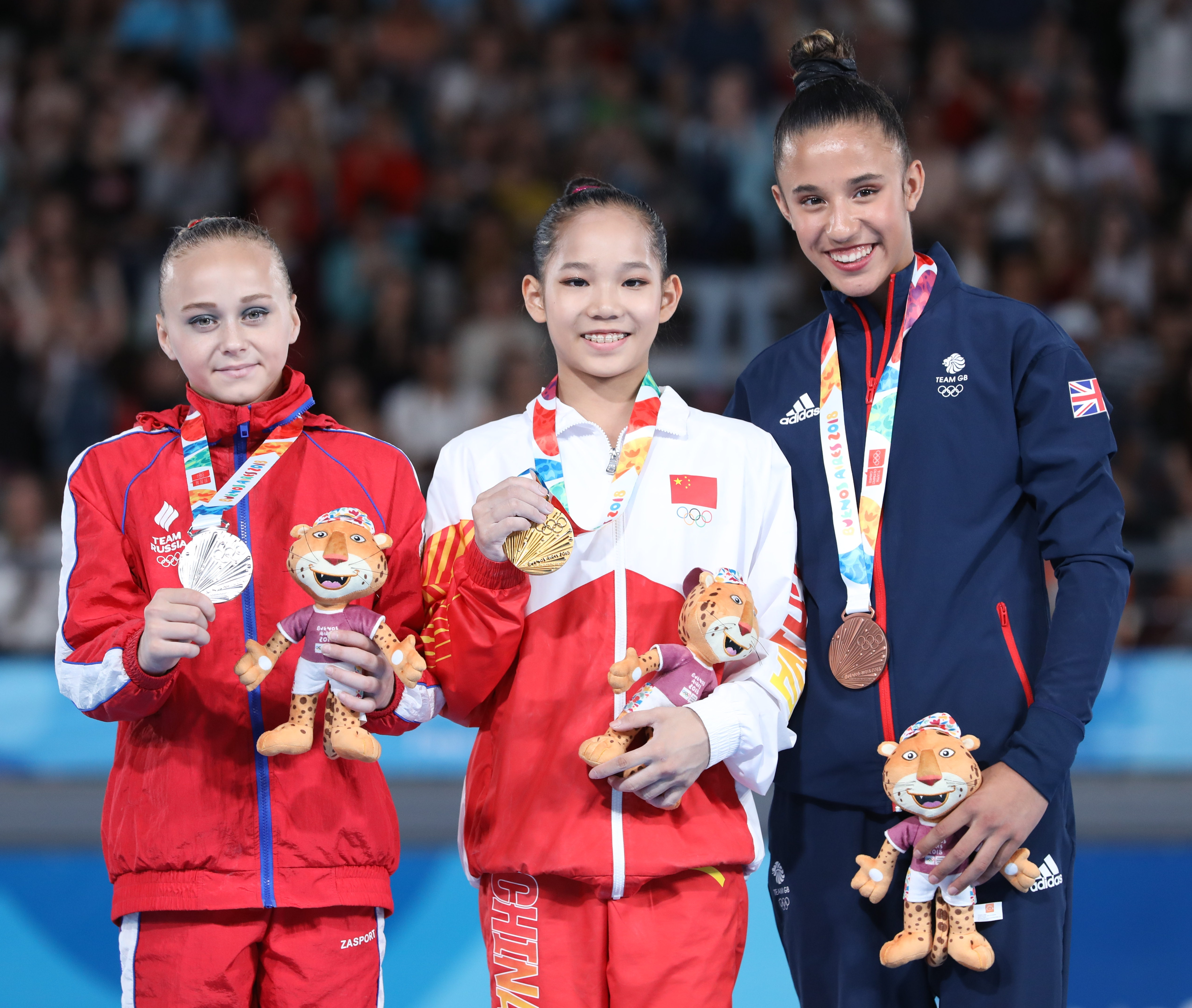
- Medalists Klimenko (left), Tang (center), and Morgan (right)
- Venue: America Pavilion
- Date: 15 October
- Competitors: 8 from 8 nations
- Winning score: 14.033

Medalists
1st place, gold medalist(s)		Tang Xijing	China
2nd place, silver medalist(s)		Ksenia Klimenko	Russia
3rd place, bronze medalist(s)		Amelie Morgan	Great Britain

The women's artistic gymnastics balance beam final at the 2018 Summer Youth Olympics was held at the America Pavilion on 15 October.

== Qualification ==
Qualification took place on 10 October. Tang Xijing from China qualified in first, followed by Ukraine's Anastasiia Bachynska and Ksenia Klimenko of Russia.

The reserves were:

1. Lisa Zimmermann (GER)
2. Ada Hautala (FIN)
3. Csenge Bácskay (HUN)

== Medalists ==
	Gold	Silver	Bronze
Balance beam	Tang Xijing (CHN)	Ksenia Klimenko (RUS)	Amelie Morgan (GBR)

== Results ==
Oldest and youngest competitors

	Name	Country	Date of birth	Age
Youngest	Ksenia Klimenko	Russia	1 November 2003	14 years, 11 months and 14 days
Oldest	Tang Xijing	China	3 January 2003	15 years, 9 months and 12 days

Rank	Gymnast	D Score	E Score	Pen.	Total
1st place, gold medalist(s)	Tang Xijing (CHN)	5.900	8.133		14.033
2nd place, silver medalist(s)	Ksenia Klimenko (RUS)	5.700	7.833		13.533
3rd place, bronze medalist(s)	Amelie Morgan (GBR)	5.500	7.533		13.033
4	Giorgia Villa (ITA)	5.200	7.766		12.966
5	Emma Slevin (IRL)	4.600	7.200		11.800
6	Anastasiia Bachynska (UKR)	5.700	6.100		11.800
7	Ana-Maria Puiu (ROU)	4.500	6.566		11.066
8	Emma Spence (CAN)	4.800	5.566		10.366

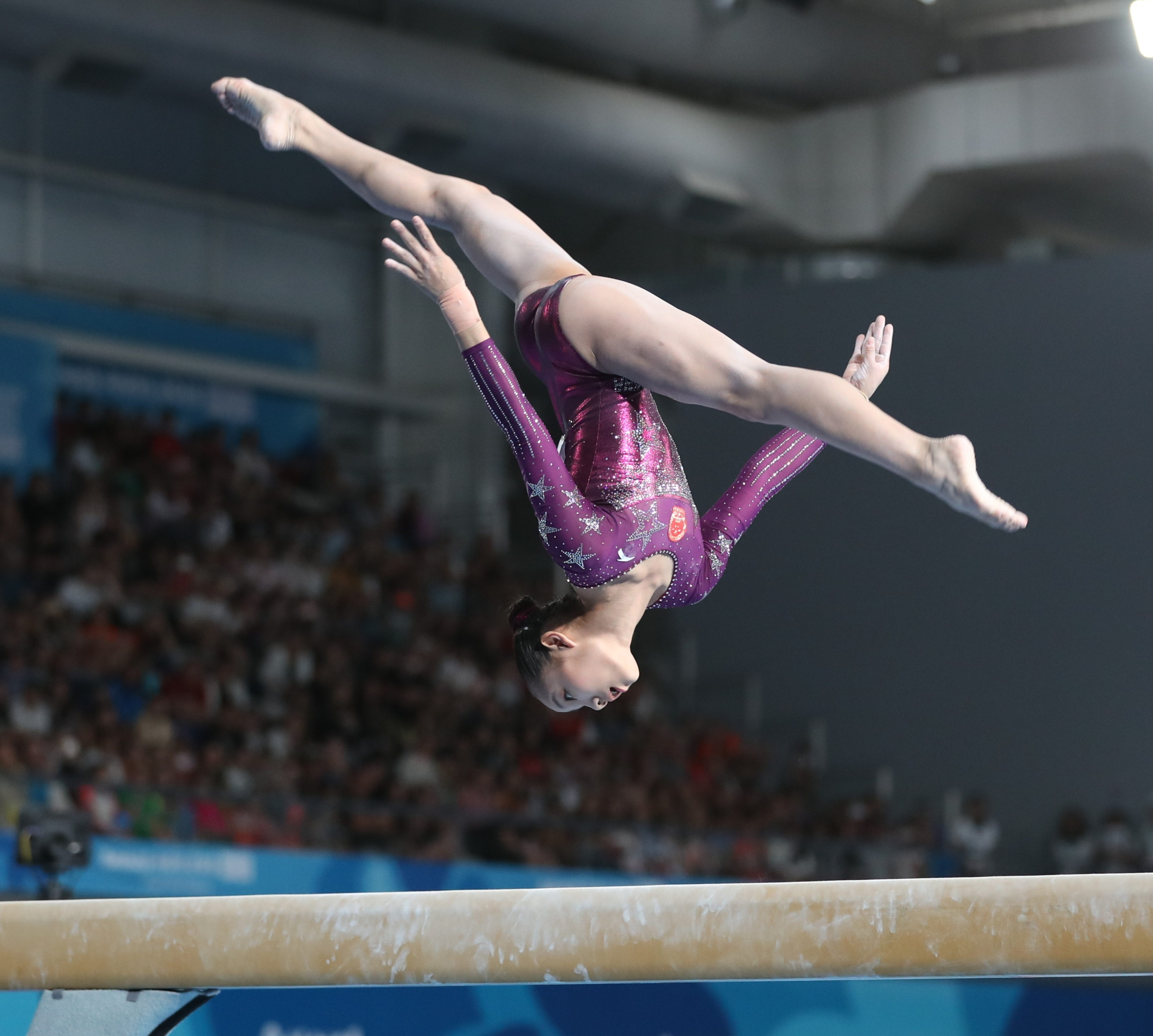
Tang Xijing

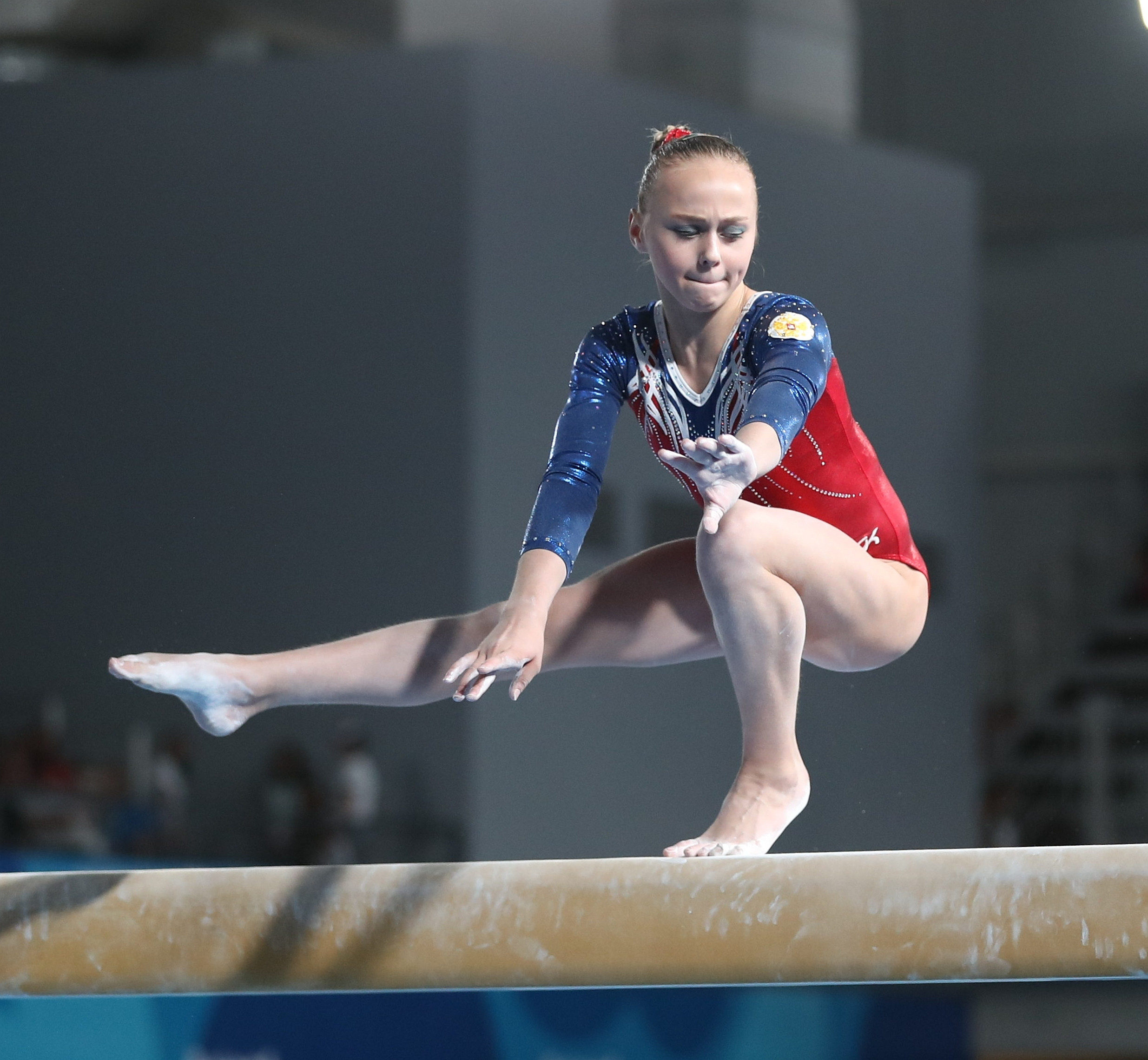
Ksenia Klimenko

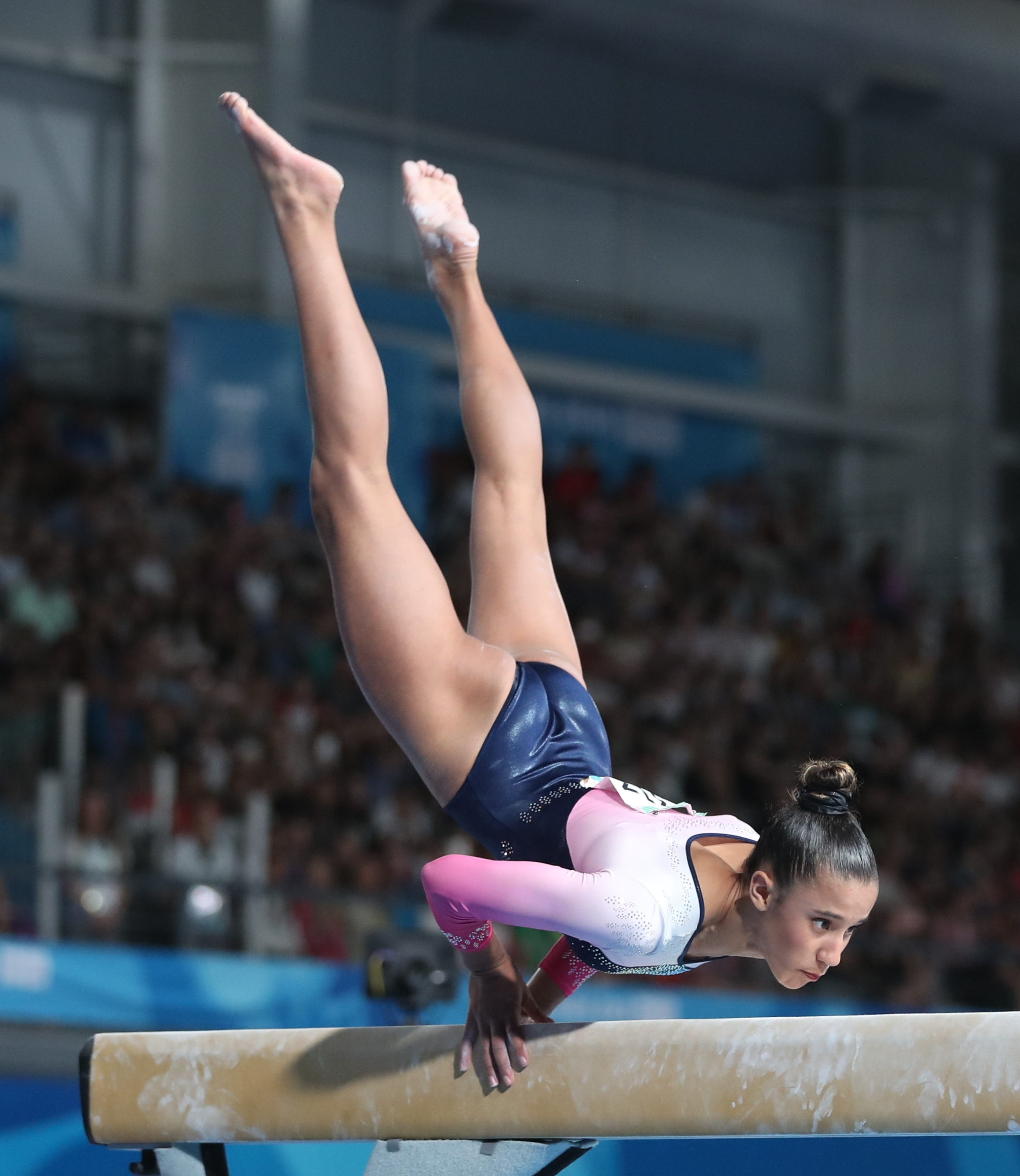
Amelie Morgan

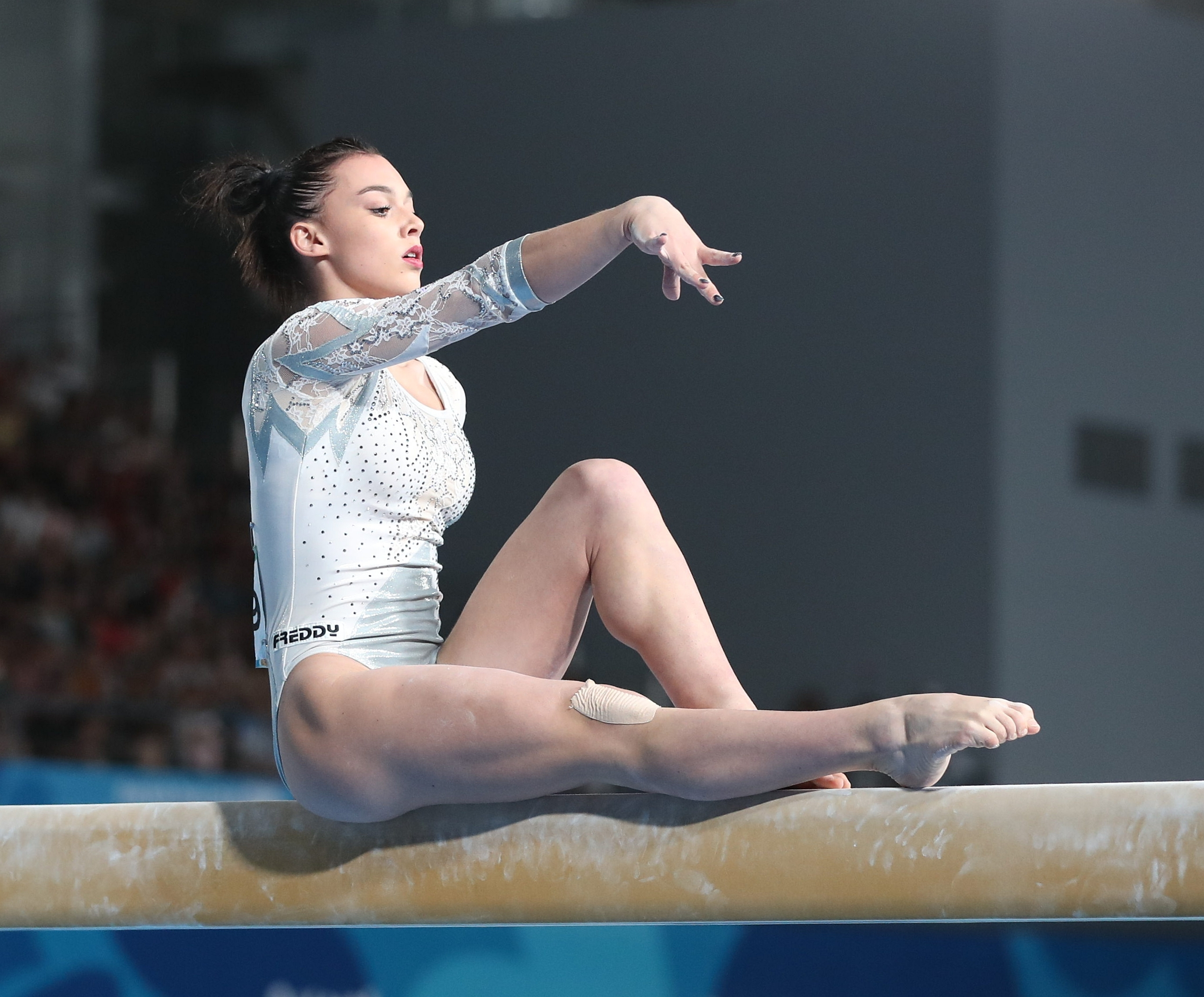
Giorgia Villa

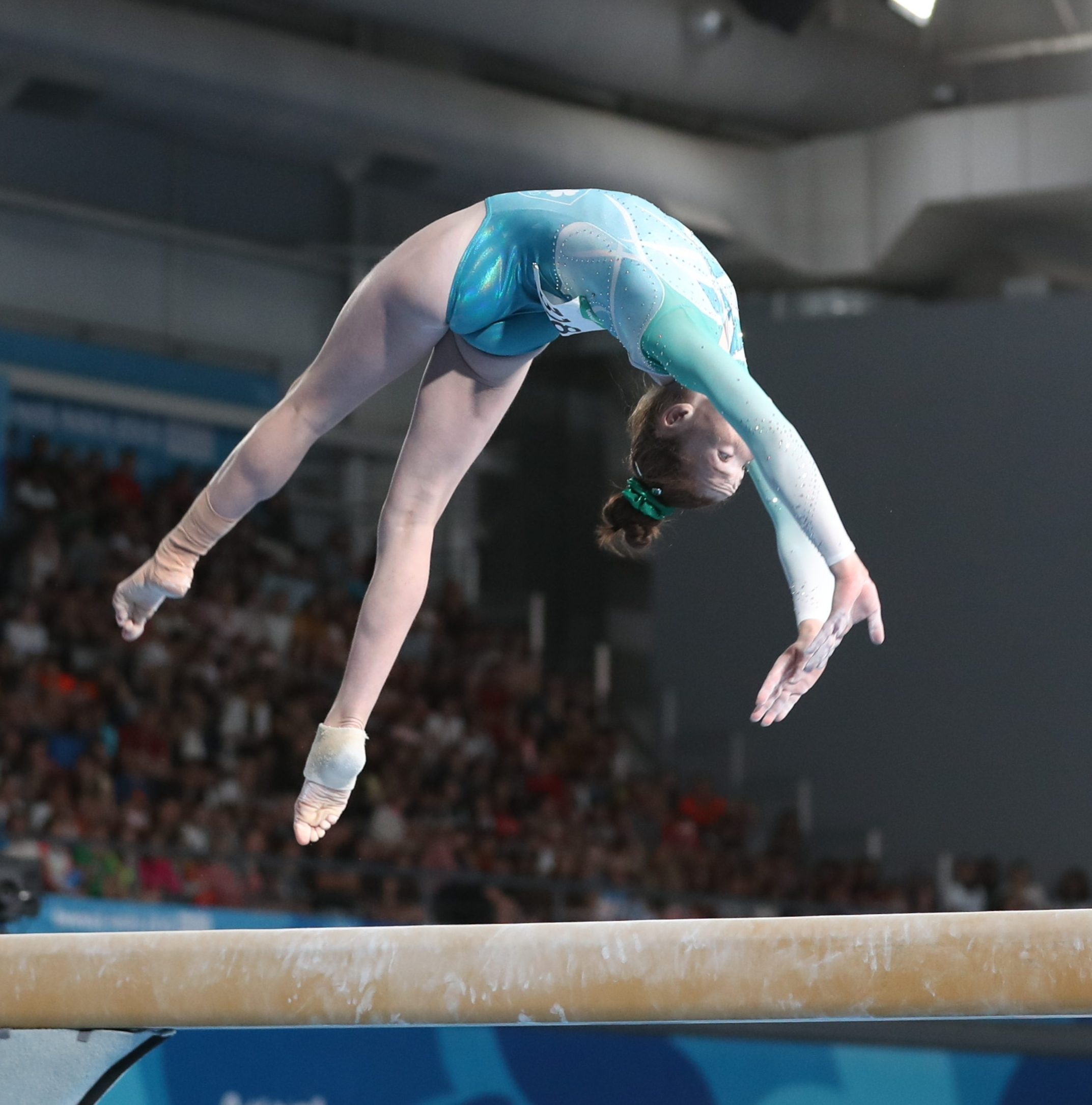
Emma Slevin

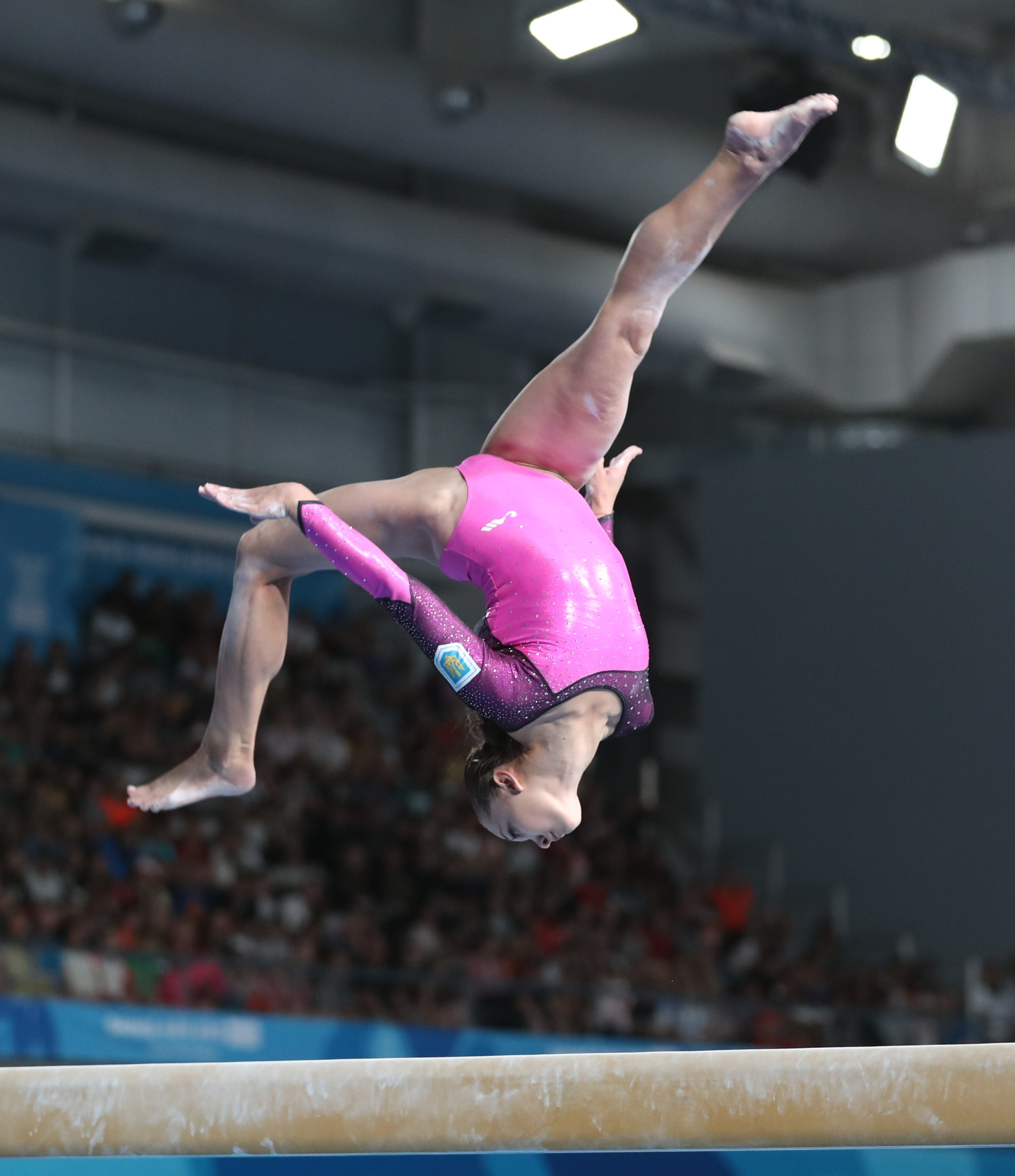
Anastasiia Bachynska

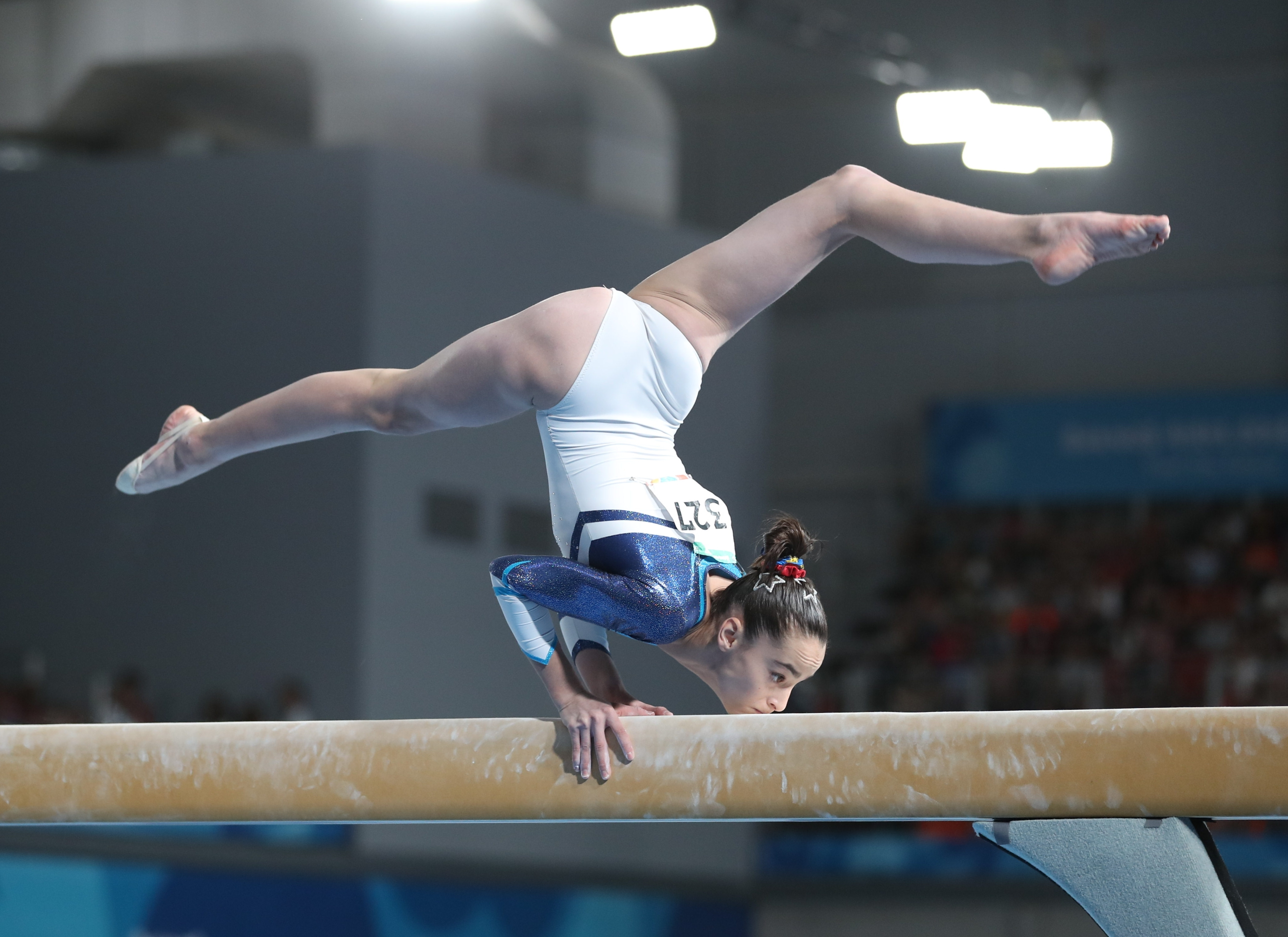
Ana-Maria Puiu

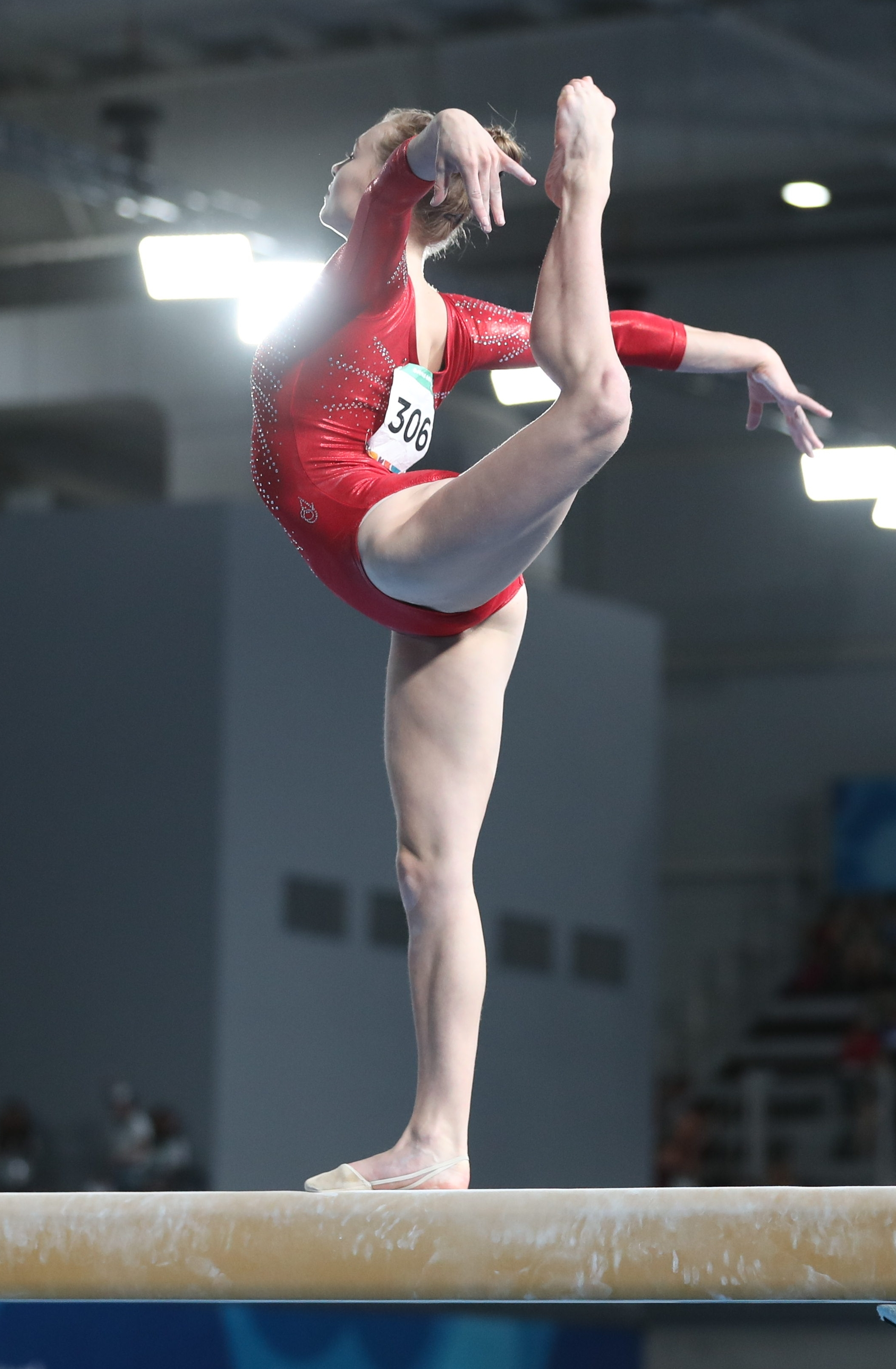
Emma Spence
