= Ksenia Klimenko =

Russian artistic gymnast

Ksenia Klimenko Ксения Клименко
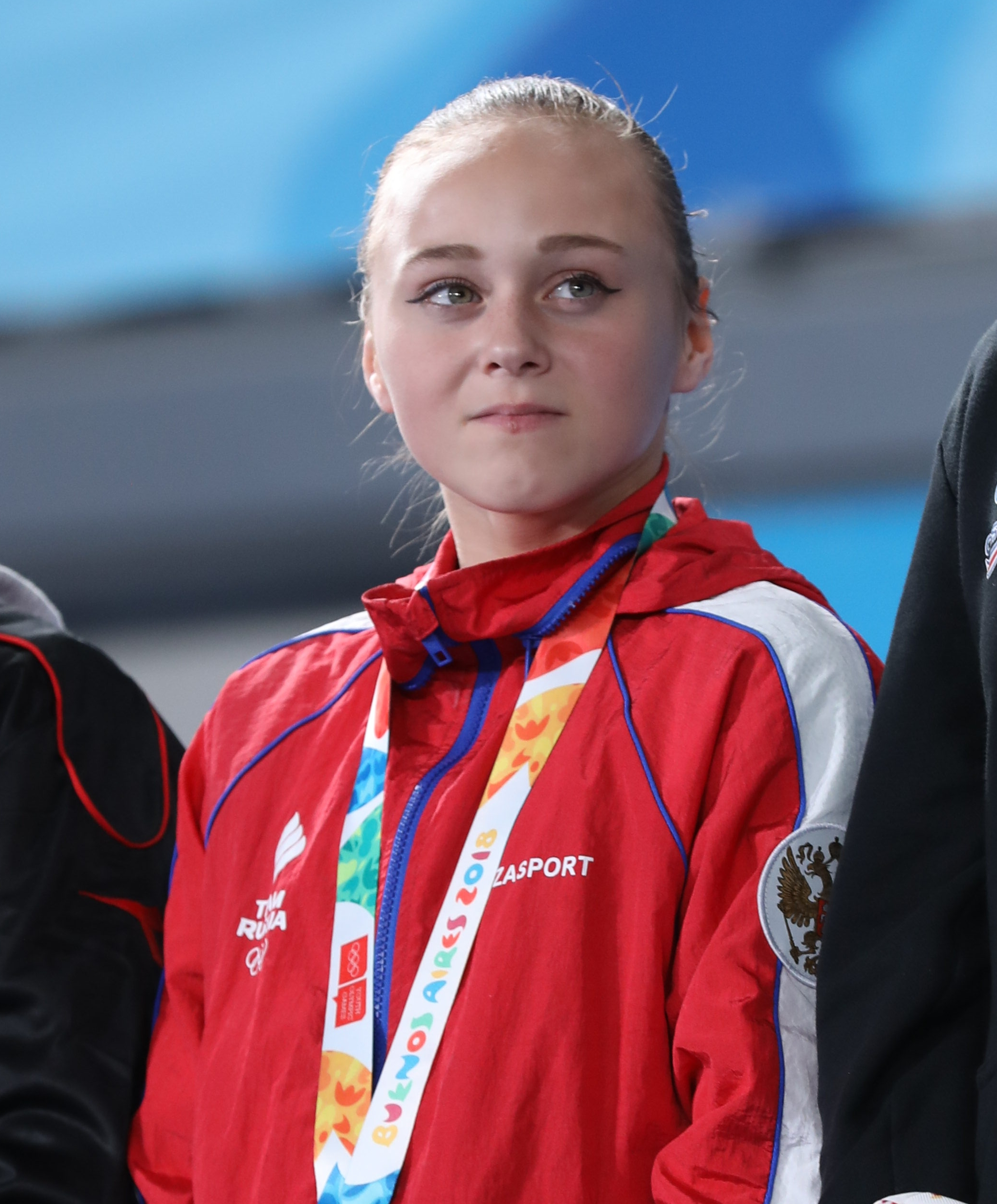
- Klimenko at the 2018 Summer Youth Olympics

Personal information
- Full name: Ksenia Anatolyevna Klimenko
- Born: November 1, 2003 (age 23) Surgut, Russia

Gymnastics career
- Discipline: Women's artistic gymnastics
- Country represented: Russia; (2017–2020)
- Club: Gazprom Transgaz Surgut
- Head coach: Ekaterina Guseva
Medal record
Women's artistic gymnastics
Representing Russia
Youth Olympic Games
Gold medal – first place	2018 Buenos Aires	Uneven Bars
Silver medal – second place	2018 Buenos Aires	Balance Beam
Representing (International Olympic Committee) Mixed-NOCs
Youth Olympic Games
Silver medal – second place	2018 Buenos Aires	Mixed team

Ksenia Anatolyevna Klimenko (Russian: Ксения Анатольевна Клименко, born 1 November 2003) is a retired Russian artistic gymnast. She is the 2018 Youth Olympics Uneven Bar Champion, the 2017 European Youth Summer Olympic Festival All-Around Champion and the 2018 European Junior all-around bronze medalist.

== Early life ==
Klimenko was born in Surgut, Khanty-Mansi Autonomous Okrug, Russia in 2003. She trained at Gazprom Transgaz Surgut and represented the Ural district.

== Gymnastics career ==
=== Junior: 2016–2018 ===
Klimenko competed at the 2016 Russian National Championships as an espoir where she won gold in the all-around, on the uneven bars, and on balance beam. She also placed third on floor exercise and sixth on vault and won silver in the team final with the Ural district.

In early 2017, Klimenko competed at the WOGA Classic. She placed third in the all-around behind fellow Russian Angelina Simakova and American Audrey Davis. She later competed at the 2017 City of Jesolo Trophy where she placed third in the team final, twelfth in the all-around, seventh on uneven bars, fourth on balance beam, and fifth on floor exercise. At the 2017 Russian National Championships, Klimenko placed first in the junior all-around, on uneven bars, and on balance beam. She also placed third on floor exercise and fifth on vault. In the summer, Klimenko competed at the 2017 European Youth Summer Olympic Festival where she won gold in the all-around, on balance beam, and on floor exercise and won silver on uneven bars.

Klimenko competed at the 2018 City of Jesolo Trophy where she helped Russia placed second in the team competition and individually she placed first on uneven bars. Klimenko next competed at the 2018 Junior European Championships where Russia won team silver behind Italy. Individually she won uneven bars gold and bronze in the all-around behind Giorgia Villa of Italy and Amelie Morgan of Great Britain. She was later selected to represent Russia at the 2018 Youth Olympics taking place in Buenos Aires, Argentina. There she qualified in third place to the floor exercise and balance beam finals and in fifth place to the individual all-around final and to the uneven bars final. In the individual all-around final she faltered on uneven bars and vault and once again finished in fifth place, making her the first Russian to not win the all-around since the inception of the Youth Olympic Games. She later won gold in the uneven bars final, matching the result of previous Russian Youth Olympic athletes Viktoria Komova and Seda Tutkhalyan. She also won silver on the balance beam behind Tang Xijing of China and placed seventh on floor exercise after a fall.

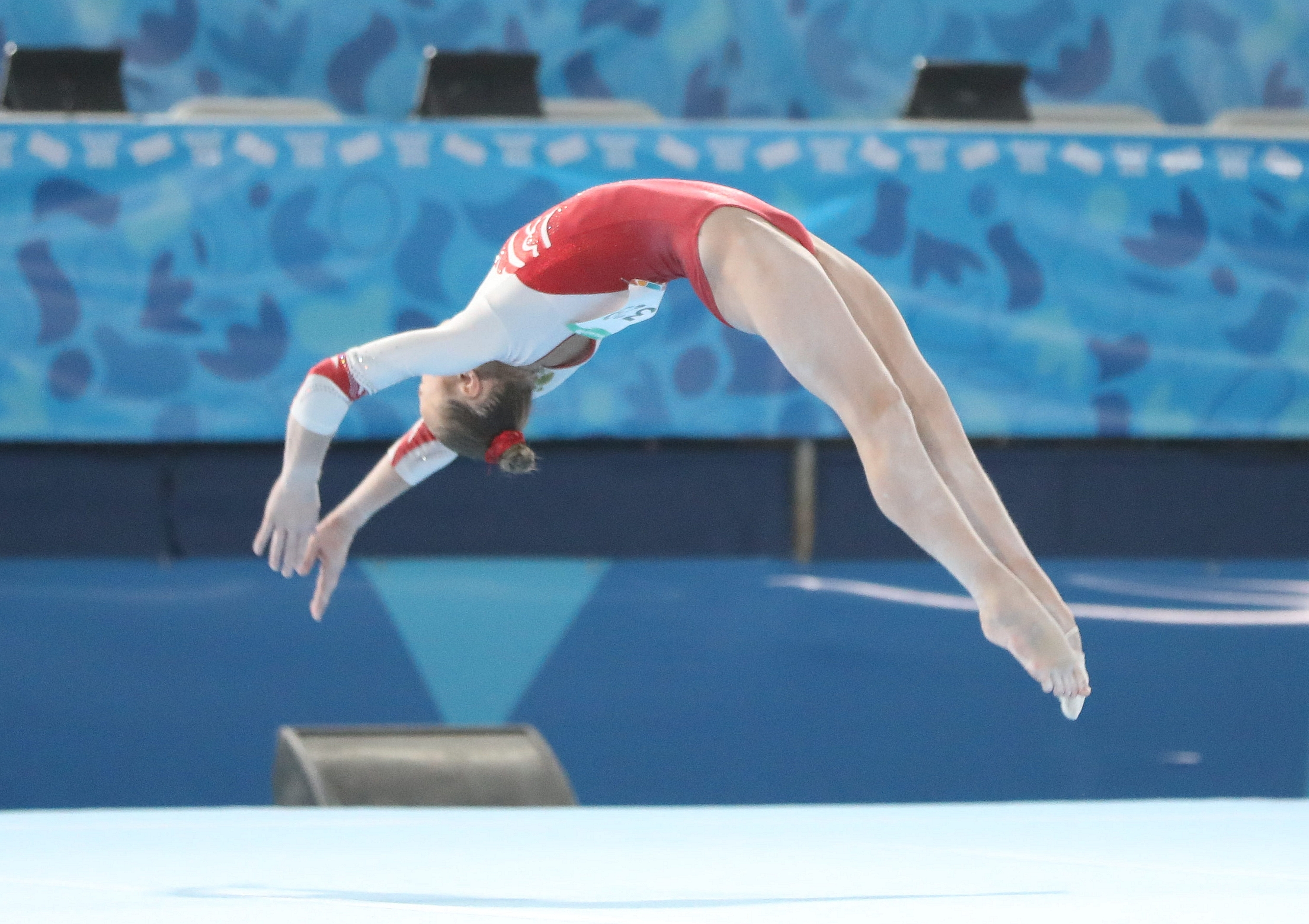
All-Around Final

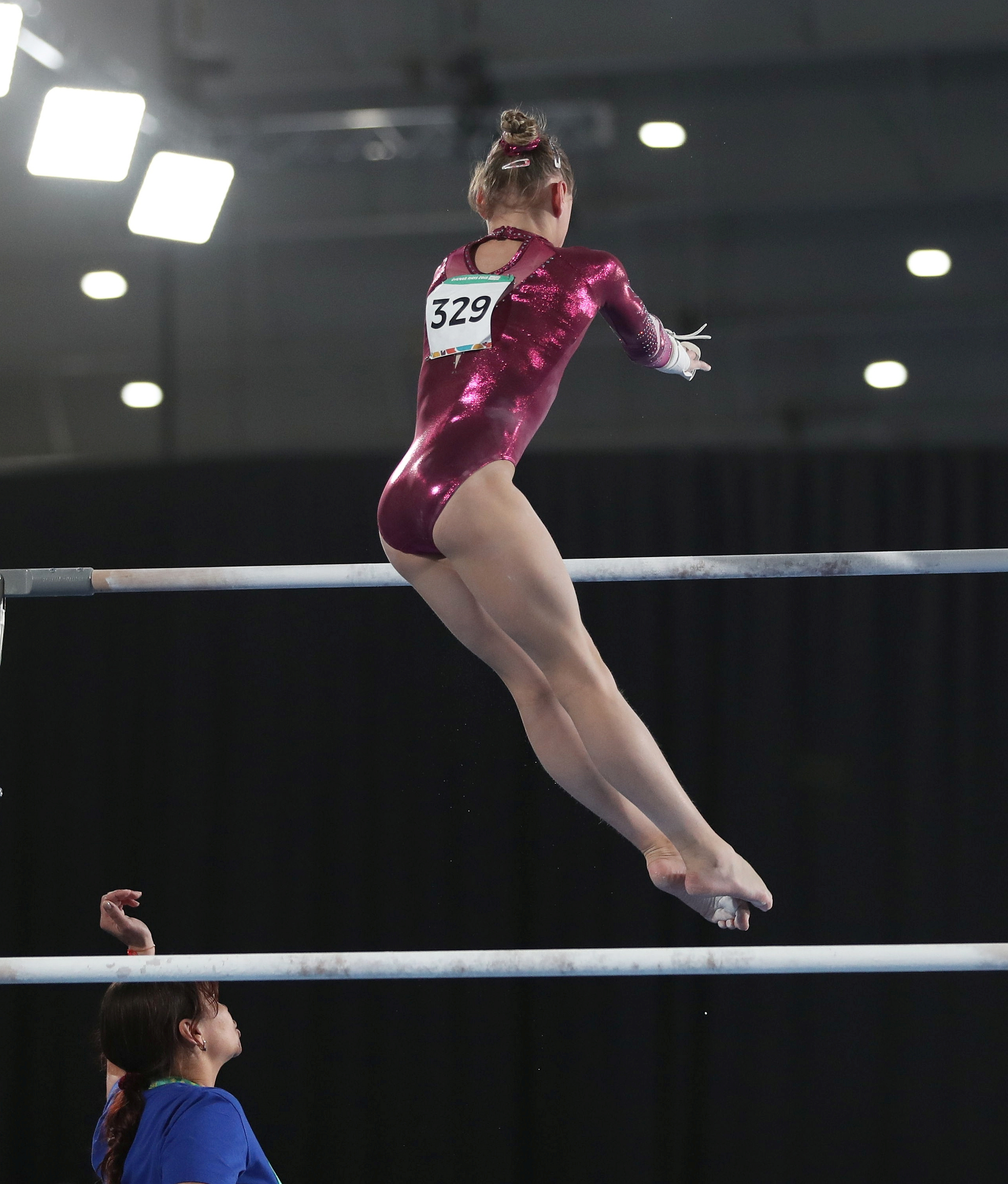
Uneven Bars Final

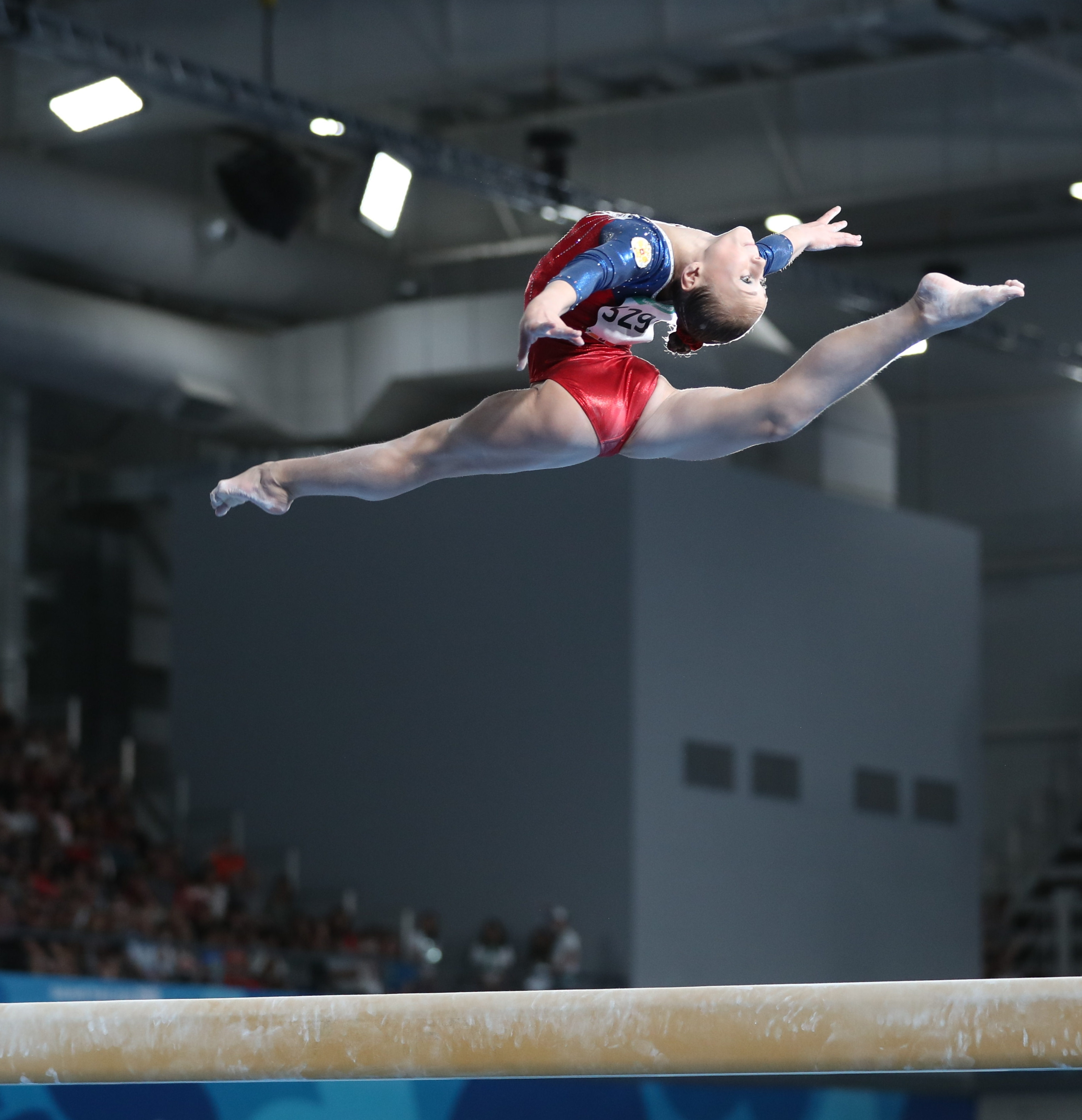
Balance Beam Final

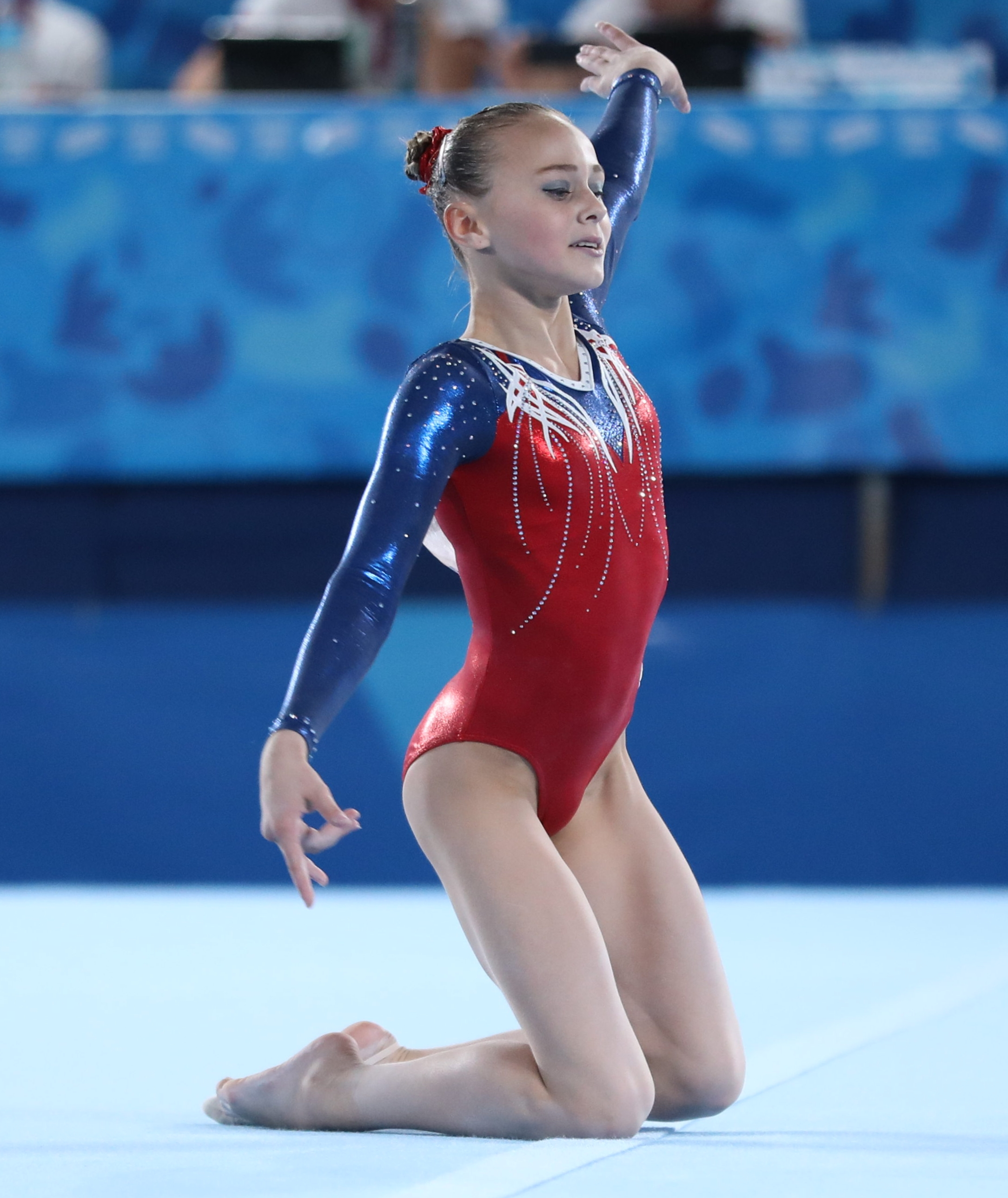
Floor Exercise Final

Klimenko at the 2018 Youth Olympics

=== Senior: 2019 ===
Klimenko became age-eligible for senior level competition in 2019. She competed at the Russian National Championships in March where she finished sixth in the all-around. It was later announced that Klimenko would compete at the Tokyo World Cup in April, replacing Angelina Simakova who would instead compete at the 2019 European Championships. Later in March, Klimenko competed at the EnBW DTB-Pokal Team Challenge in Stuttgart where she helped Russia win silver in the team final. At the Tokyo World Cup, Klimenko finished in eighth place after falling off the uneven bars, crashing her uneven bars dismount, and placing her hands on the balance beam. In August, Klimenko competed at the Russian Cup where she finished twelfth in the all-around and did not qualify for any event finals.

== Competitive history ==
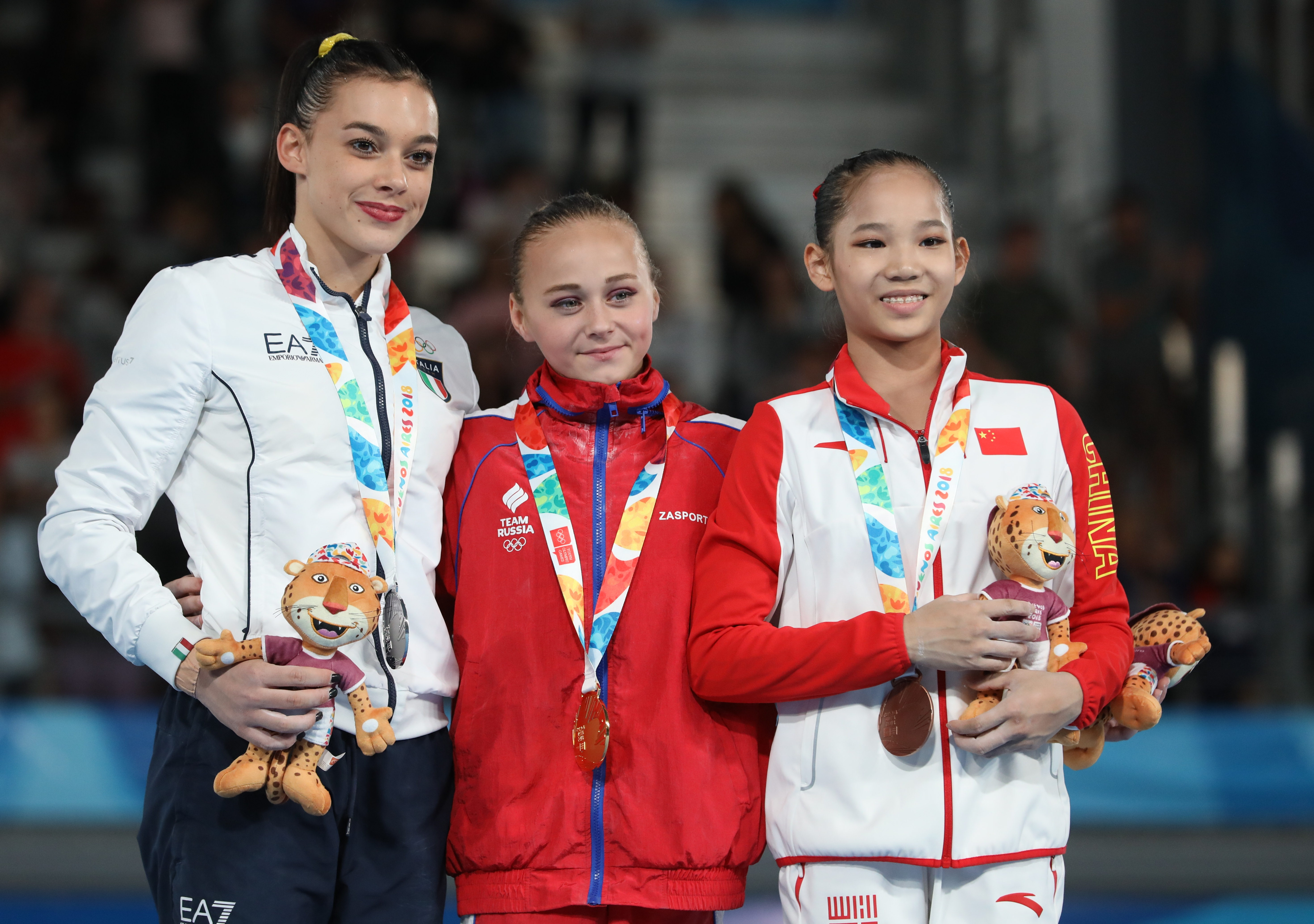
Klimenko (center) on the uneven bars podium at the 2018 Youth Olympic Games

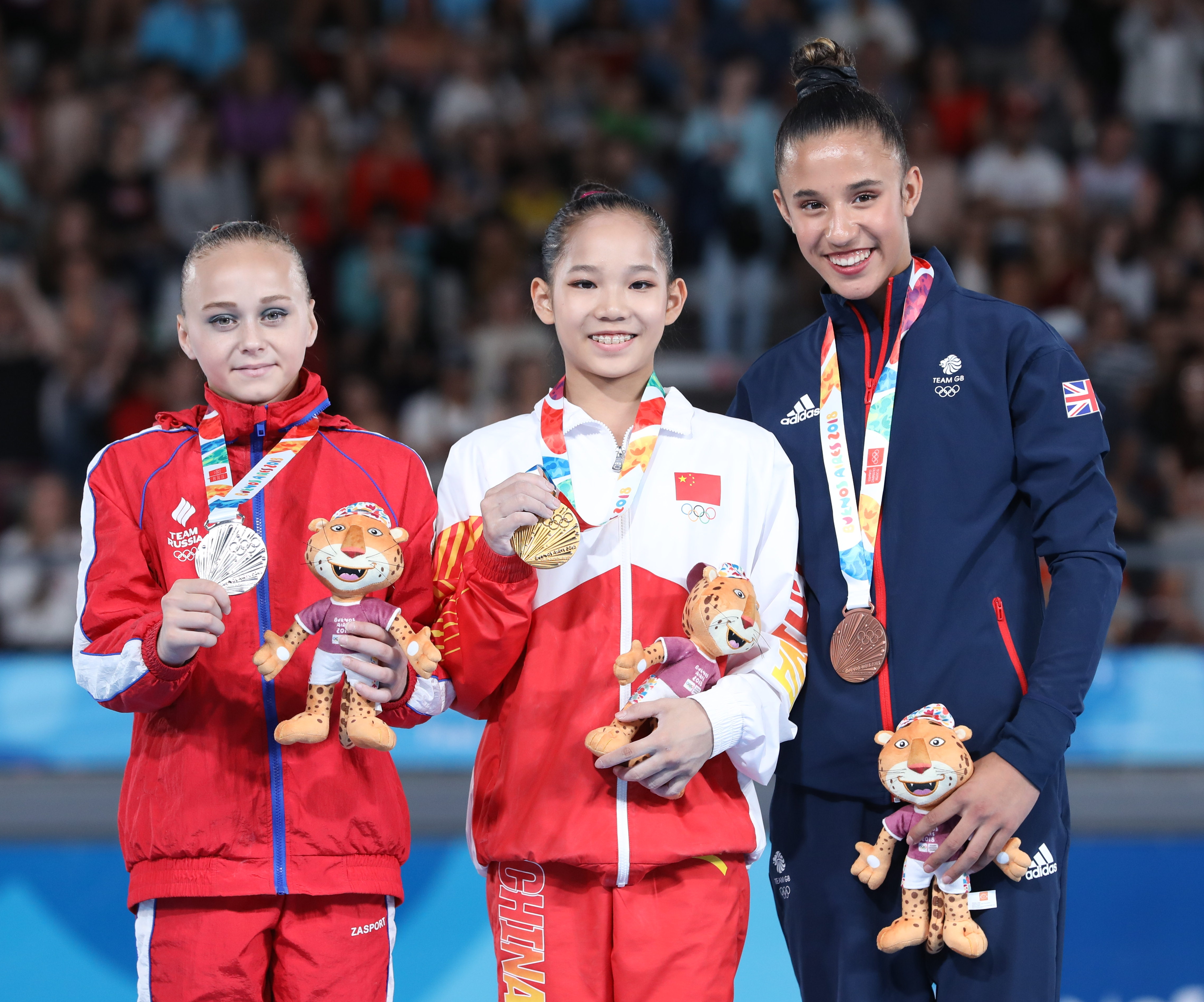
Klimenko (left) on the balance beam podium at the 2018 Youth Olympic Games

Competitive history of Ksenia Klimenko at the junior level
Year	Event	Team	AA	VT	UB	BB	FX
2016	Russian Championships	2nd place, silver medalist(s)	1st place, gold medalist(s)	6	1st place, gold medalist(s)	1st place, gold medalist(s)	3rd place, bronze medalist(s)
2017	WOGA Classic		3rd place, bronze medalist(s)				
2017	City of Jesolo Trophy	3rd place, bronze medalist(s)	12		7	4	5
2017	Russian Championships		1st place, gold medalist(s)	5	1st place, gold medalist(s)	1st place, gold medalist(s)	3rd place, bronze medalist(s)
2017	Euro Youth Olympic Festival	1st place, gold medalist(s)	1st place, gold medalist(s)		2nd place, silver medalist(s)	1st place, gold medalist(s)	1st place, gold medalist(s)
2017	Elite Gym Massilia				1st place, gold medalist(s)	6	
2017	Voronin Cup				2nd place, silver medalist(s)		
2018	City of Jesolo Trophy	2nd place, silver medalist(s)			1st place, gold medalist(s)		
2018	Youth Olympic Qualifier		7				
2018	Russian Championships		1st place, gold medalist(s)		2nd place, silver medalist(s)	4	4
2018	European Championships	2nd place, silver medalist(s)	3rd place, bronze medalist(s)		1st place, gold medalist(s)	4	
2018	Youth Olympic Games	(silver) (Note: The teams were randomly assigned with gymnasts from different countries and disciplines)	5		1st place, gold medalist(s)	2nd place, silver medalist(s)	7

Competitive history of Ksenia Klimenko at the senior level
Year	Event	Team	AA	VT	UB	BB	FX
2019	National Championships	5	6		8	3rd place, bronze medalist(s)	4
2019	EnBW DTB-Pokal Team Cup	2nd place, silver medalist(s)					
2019	Tokyo World Cup		8				
2019	Russian Cup		12				

== International scores ==
Year	Competition Description	Location	Apparatus	Rank-Final	Score-Final	Rank-Qualifying	Score-Qualifying
2018	Youth Olympic Games	Buenos Aires	All-Around	5	51.199	5	51.499
2018	Youth Olympic Games	Buenos Aires	Uneven Bars	1	14.266	5	13.266
2018	Youth Olympic Games	Buenos Aires	Balance Beam	2	13.533	3	13.100
2018	Youth Olympic Games	Buenos Aires	Floor Exercise	7	12.000	3	13.033
