= Gymnastics at the 2018 Summer Youth Olympics – Girls' uneven bars =

Women's uneven bars at the III Summer Youth Olympic Games
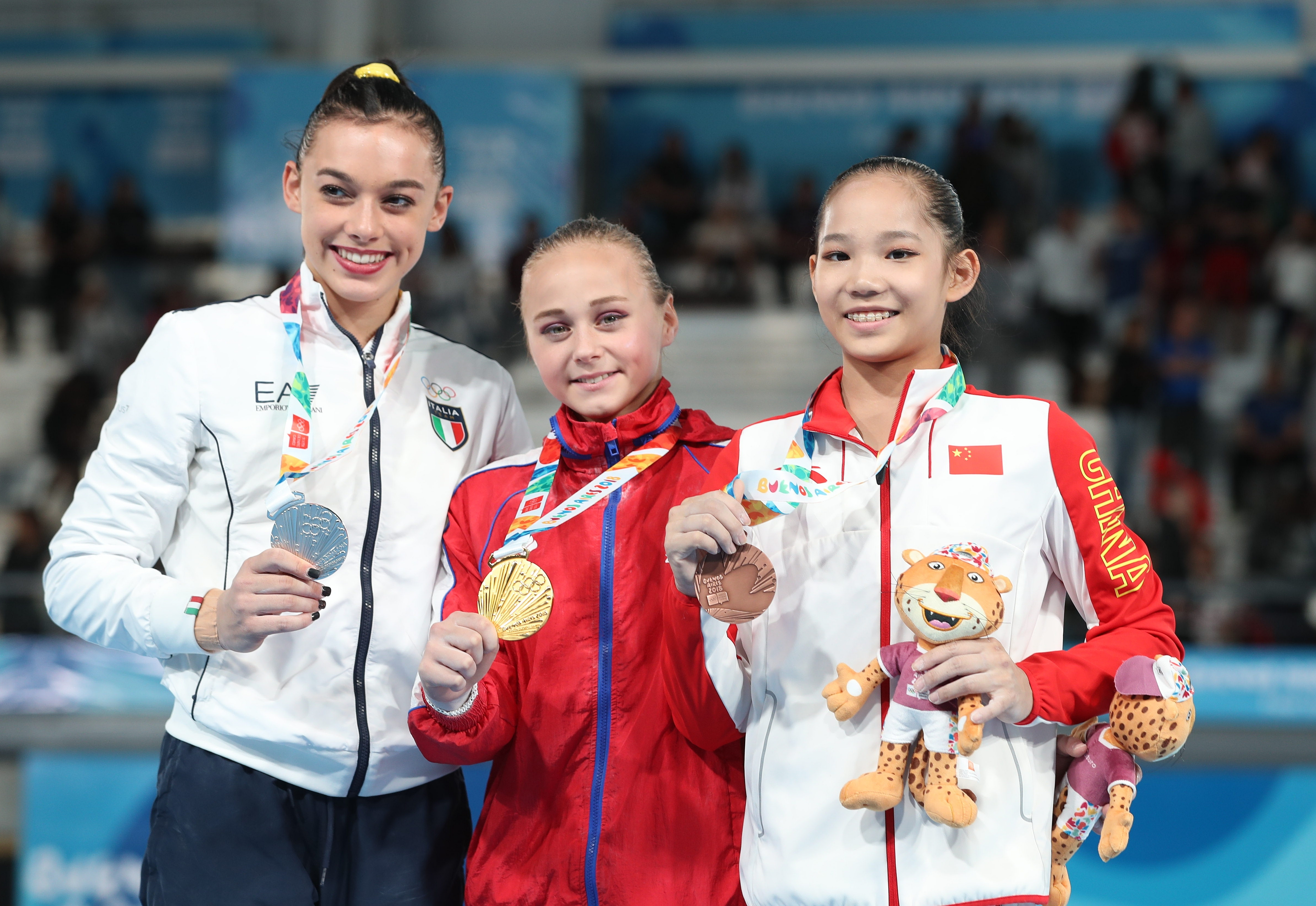
- The medalists: Villa (left), Klimenko (center), and Tang (right)
- Venue: America Pavilion
- Date: October 13
- Competitors: 8 from 8 nations
- Winning score: 14.266

Medalists
1st place, gold medalist(s)		Ksenia Klimenko	Russia
2nd place, silver medalist(s)		Giorgia Villa	Italy
3rd place, bronze medalist(s)		Tang Xijing	China

The women's artistic gymnastics uneven bars final at the 2018 Summer Youth Olympics was held at the America Pavilion on October 13.

== Qualification ==
Qualification took place on October 9. Giorgia Villa from Italy qualified in first, followed by Ukraine's Anastasiia Bachynska and Tang Xijing of China.

The reserves were:

1. Lisa Zimmermann (GER)
2. Kate Sayer (AUS)
3. Emma Spence (CAN)

== Medalists ==
	Gold	Silver	Bronze
Uneven bars	Ksenia Klimenko (RUS)	Giorgia Villa (ITA)	Tang Xijing (CHN)

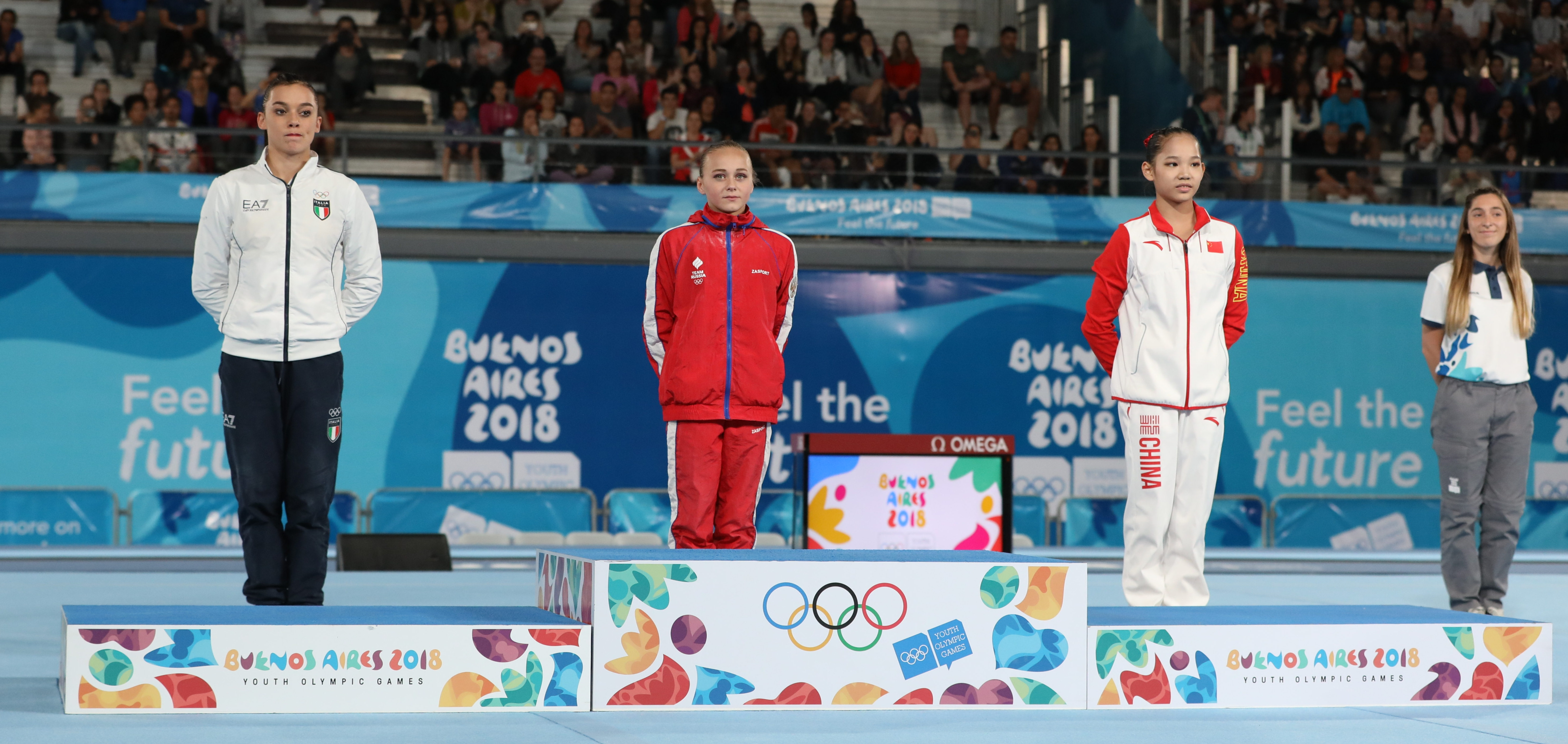
Victory ceremony, from left to right: Giorgia Villa, Ksenia Klimenko, Tang Xijing

== Results ==
Oldest and youngest competitors

	Name	Country	Date of birth	Age
Youngest	Ksenia Klimenko	Russia	1 November 2003	14 years, 11 months and 12 days
Oldest	Tang Xijing	China	3 January 2003	15 years, 9 months and 10 days

Rank	Gymnast	D Score	E Score	Pen.	Total
1st place, gold medalist(s)	Ksenia Klimenko (RUS)	5.900	8.366		14.266
2nd place, silver medalist(s)	Giorgia Villa (ITA)	6.000	8.166		14.166
3rd place, bronze medalist(s)	Tang Xijing (CHN)	6.000	7.900		13.900
4	Amelie Morgan (GBR)	5.100	8.300		13.400
5	Lee Yun-seo (KOR)	5.100	8.066		13.166
6	Anastasiia Bachynska (UKR)	5.200	7.933		13.133
7	Tonya Paulsson (SWE)	4.600	8.200		12.800
8	Emma Slevin (IRL)	4.600	8.000		12.600

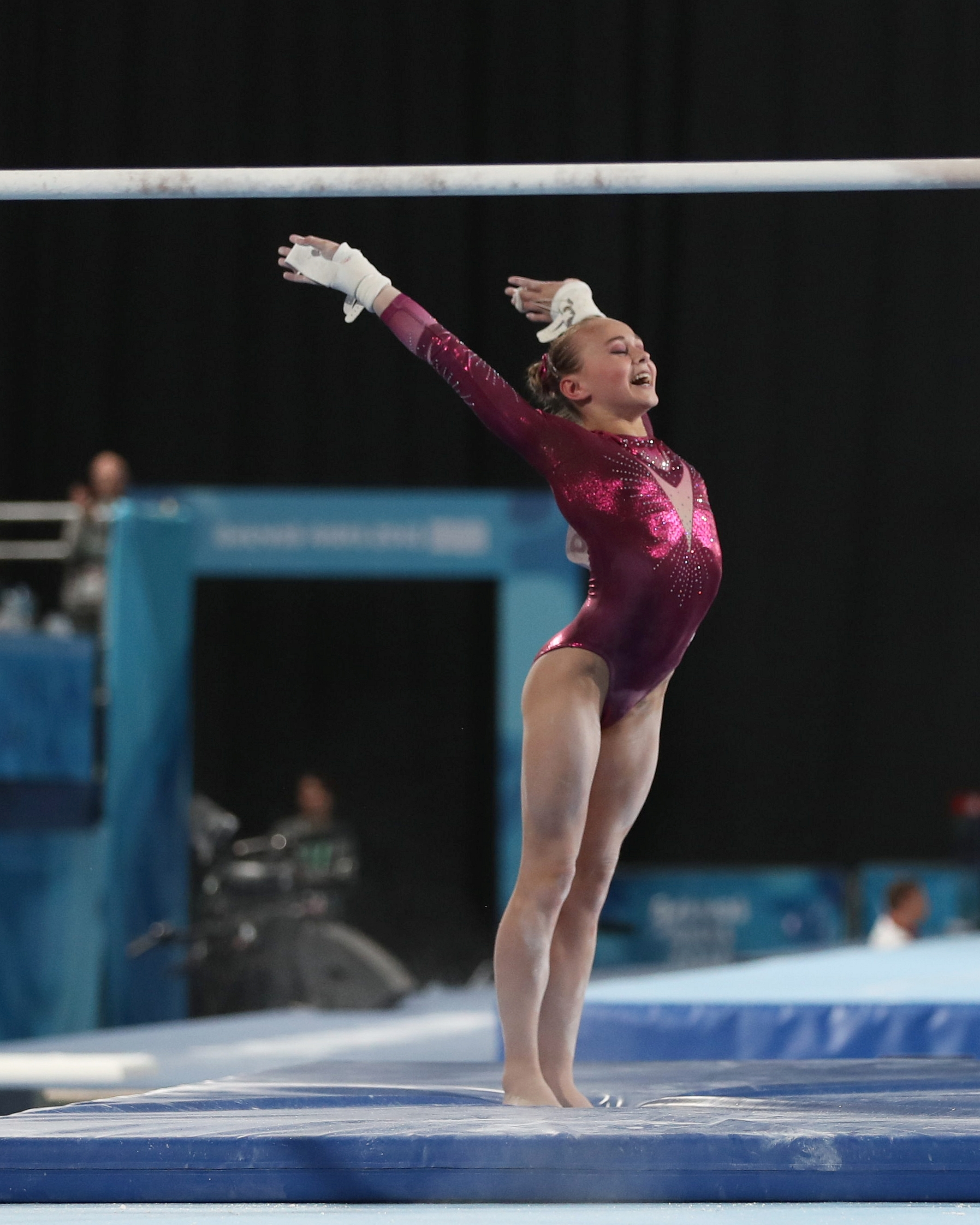
Ksenia Klimenko

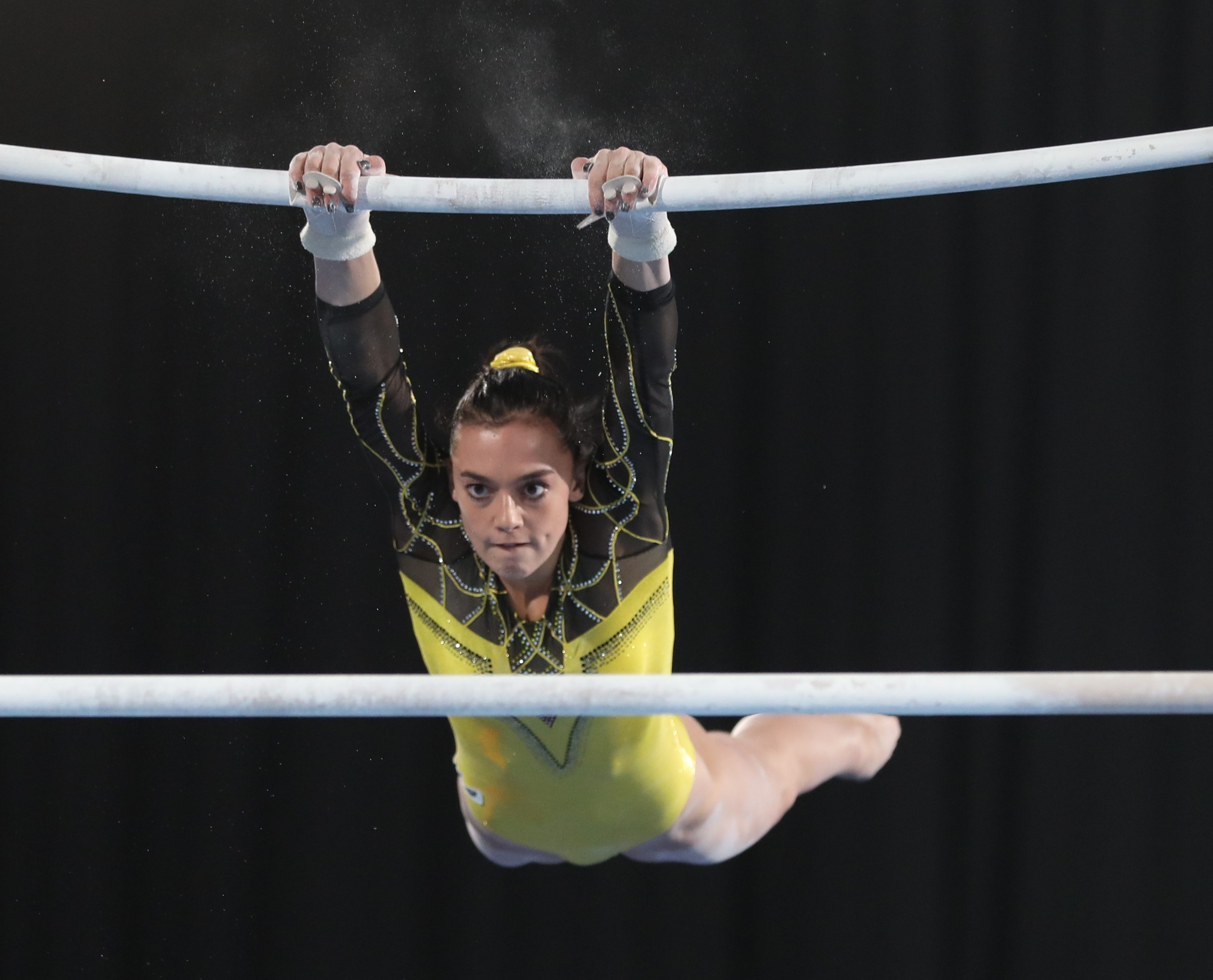
Giorgia Villa

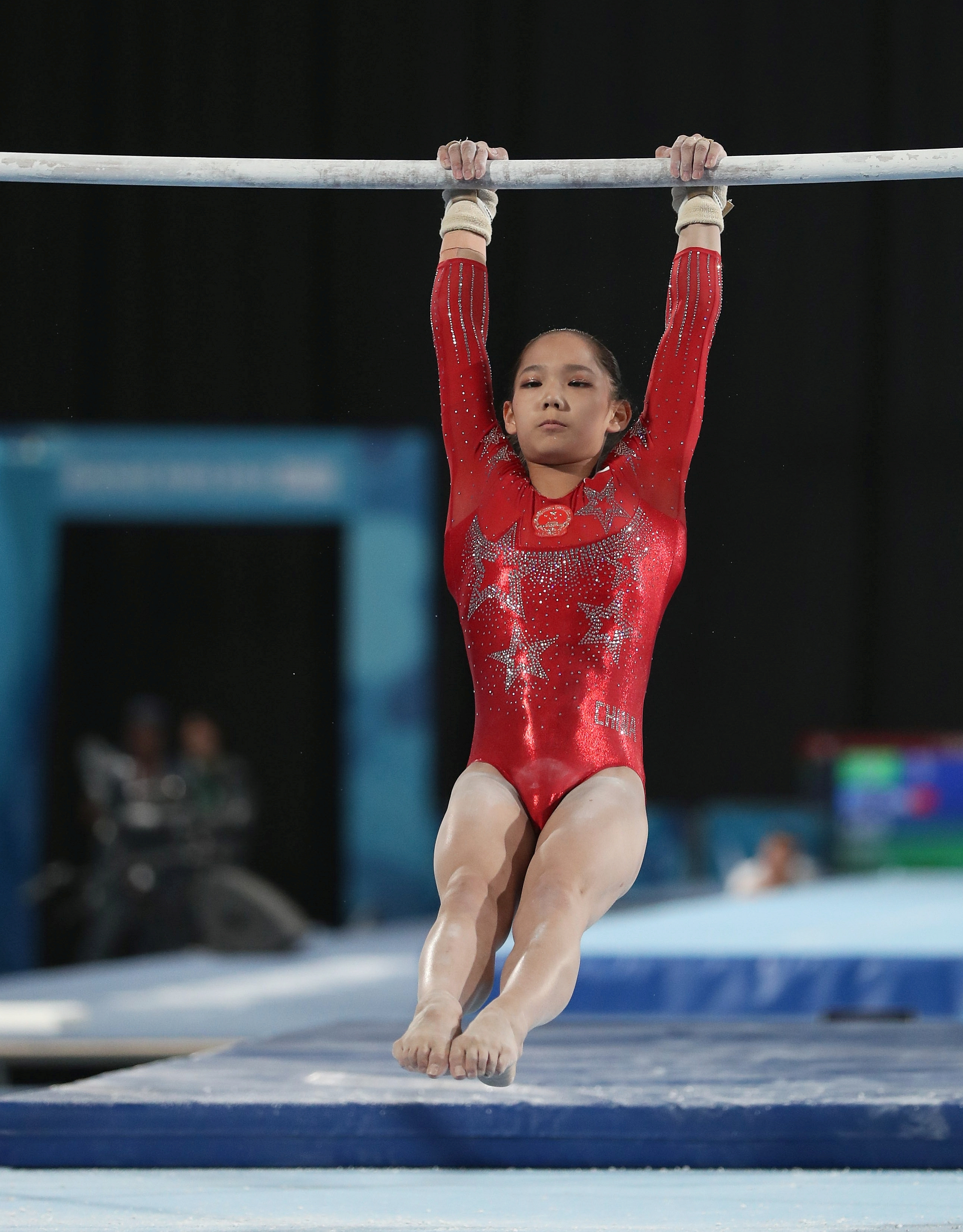
Tang Xijing

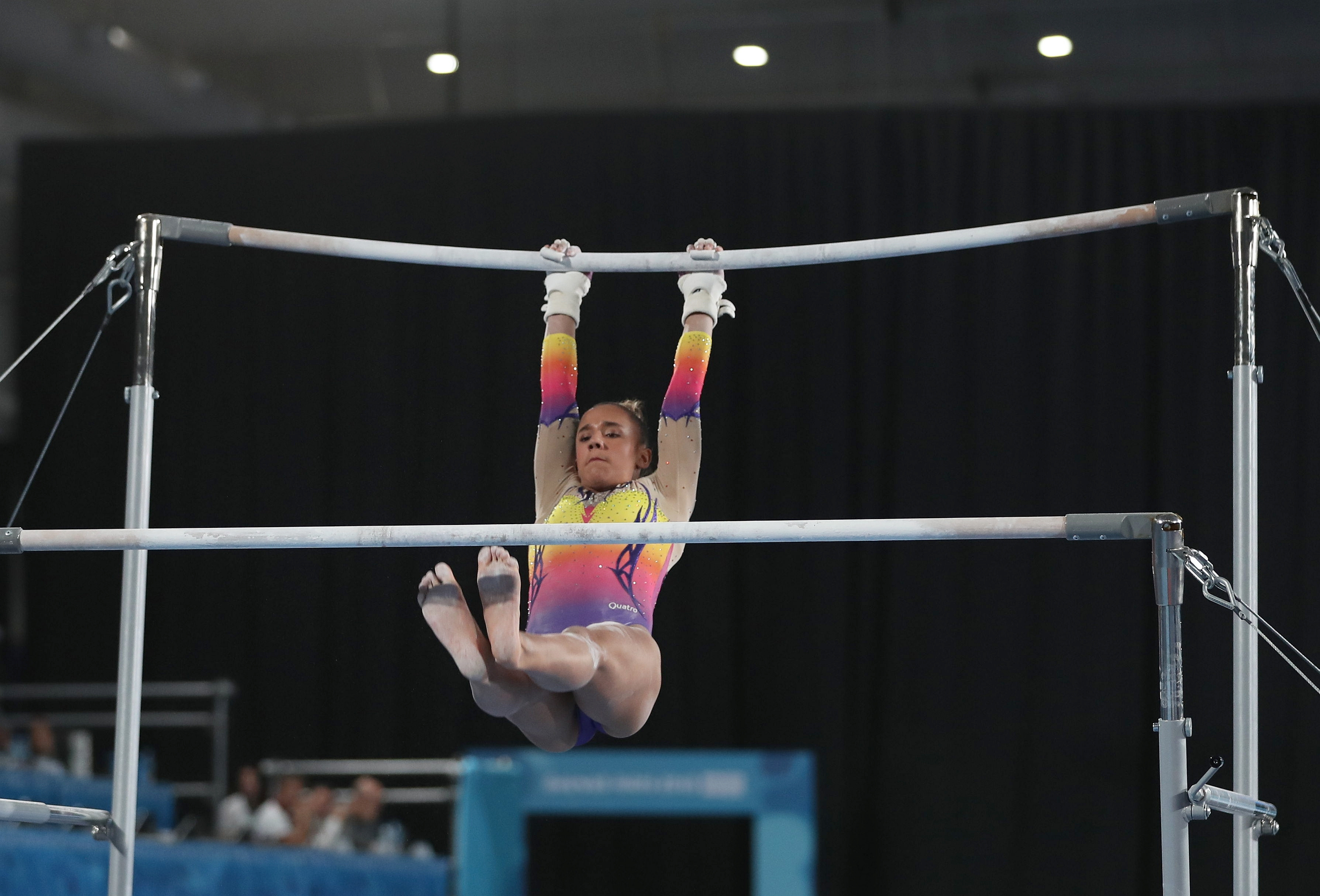
Amelie Morgan

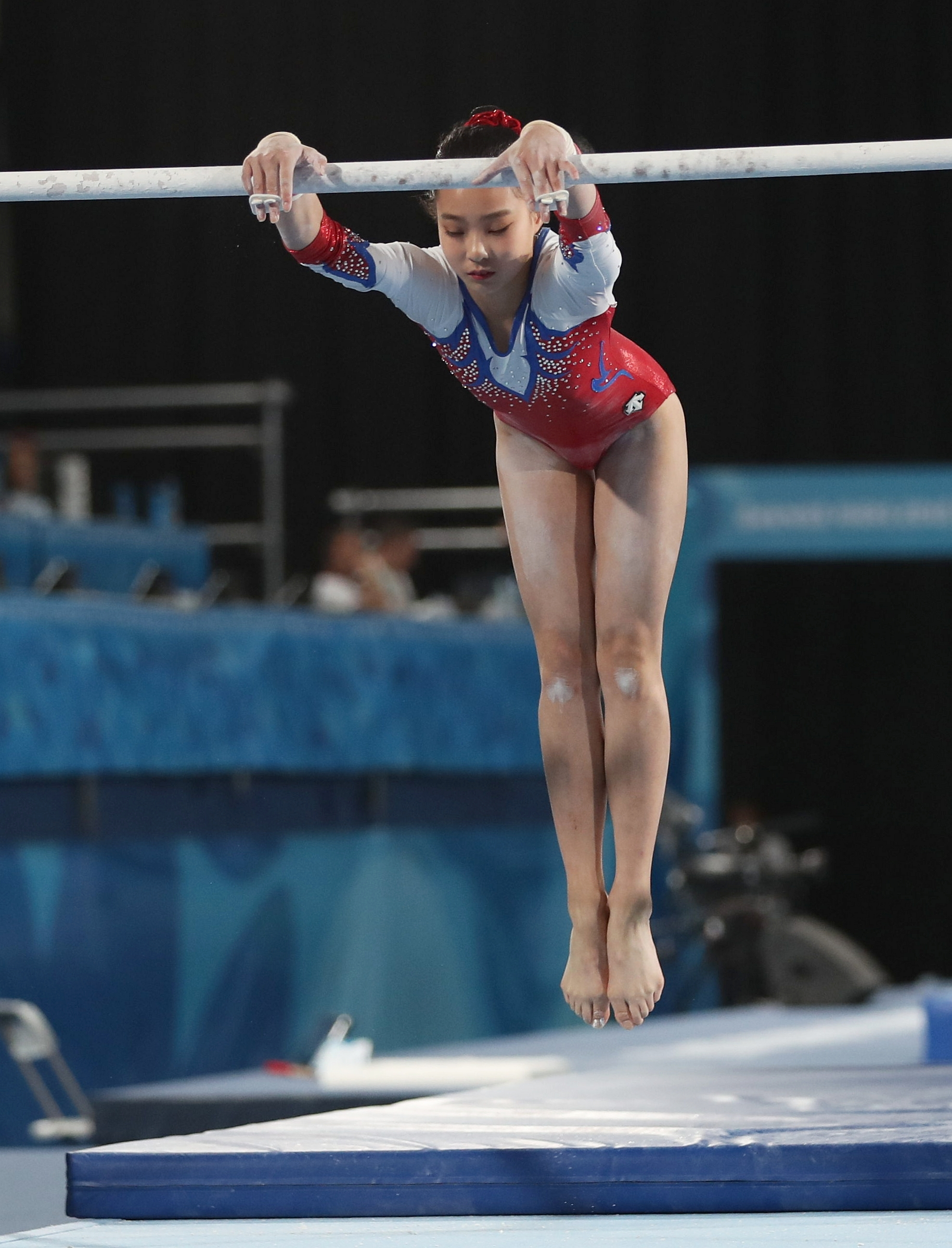
Lee Yun-seo

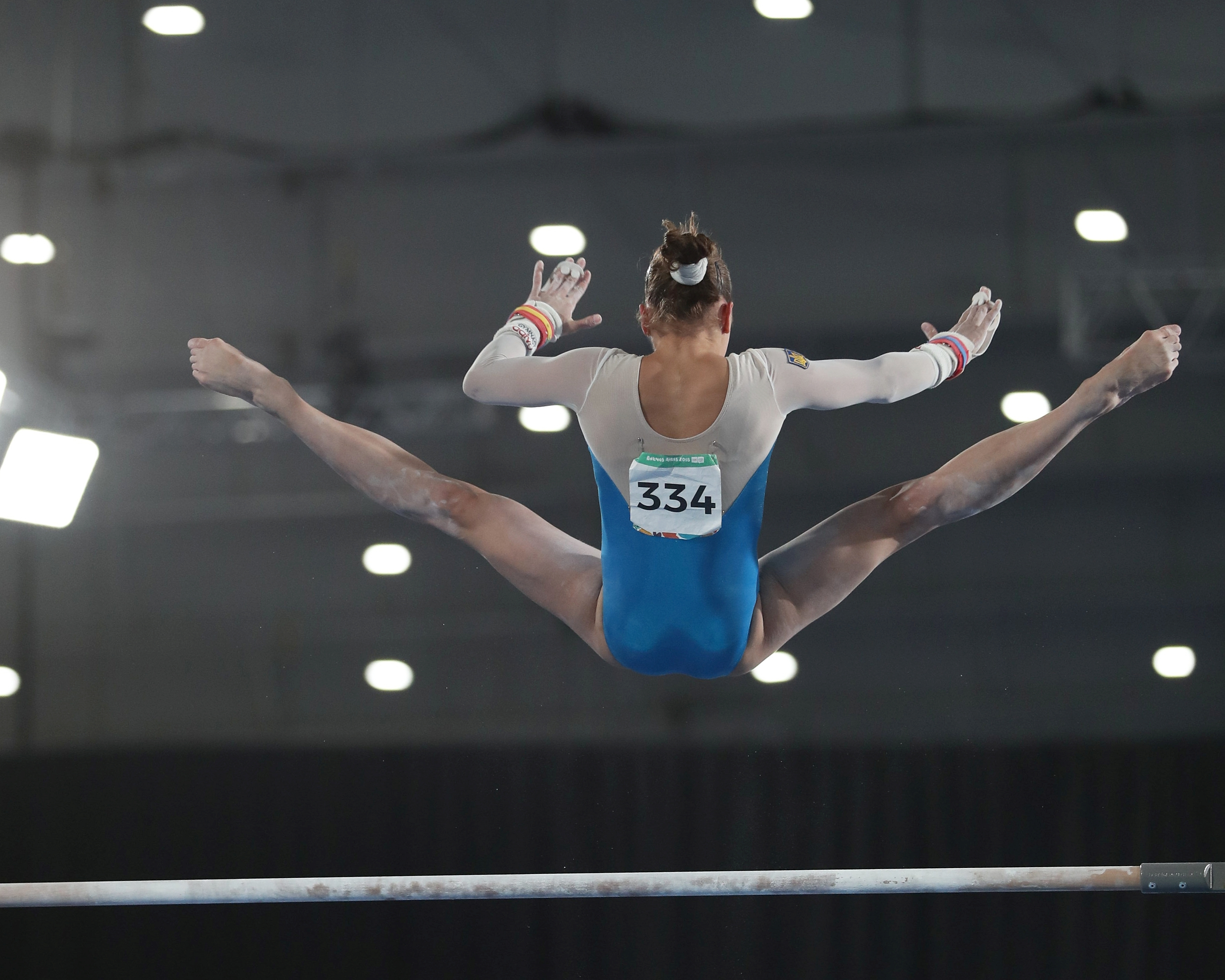
Anastasiia Bachynska

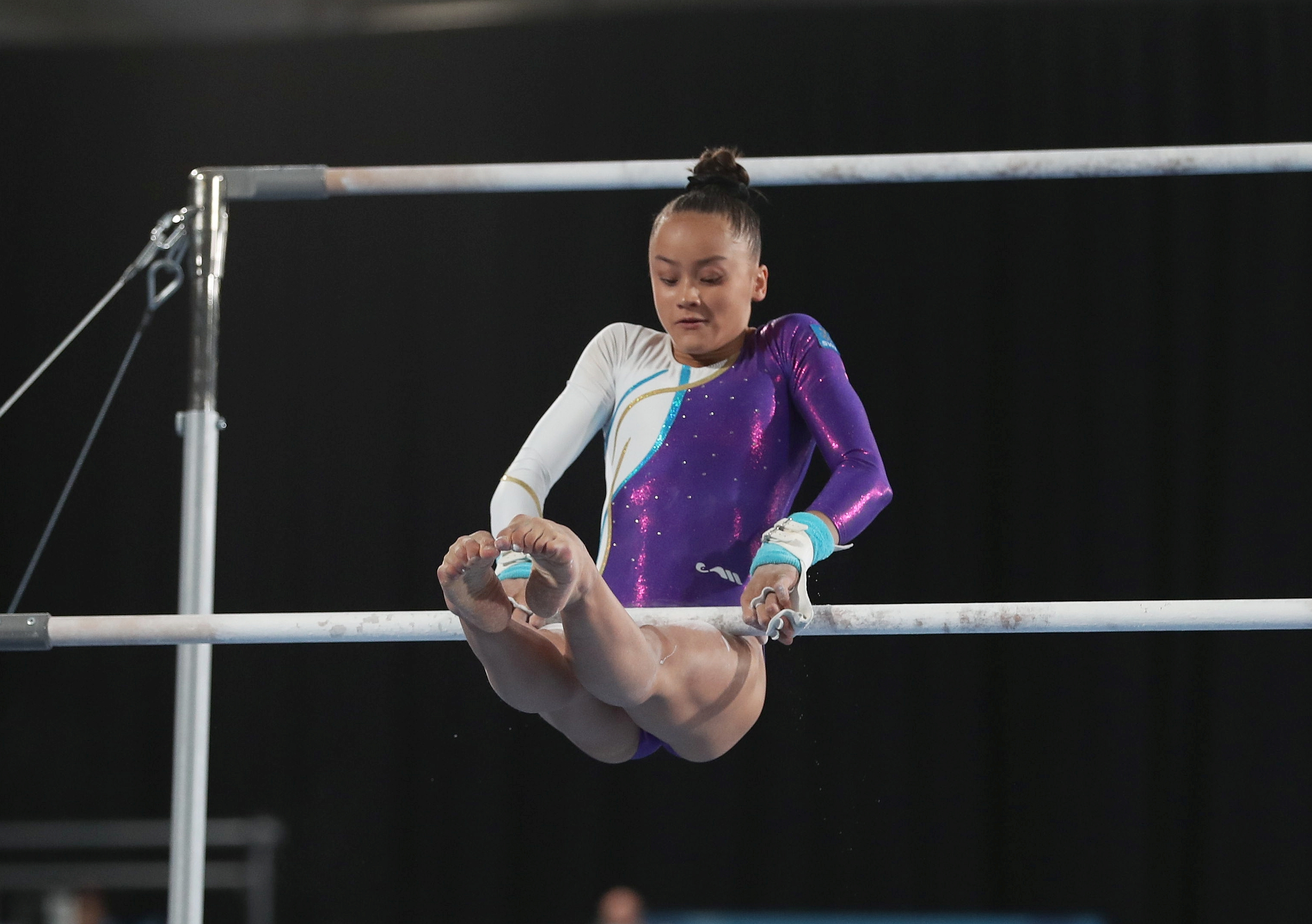
Tonya Paulsson

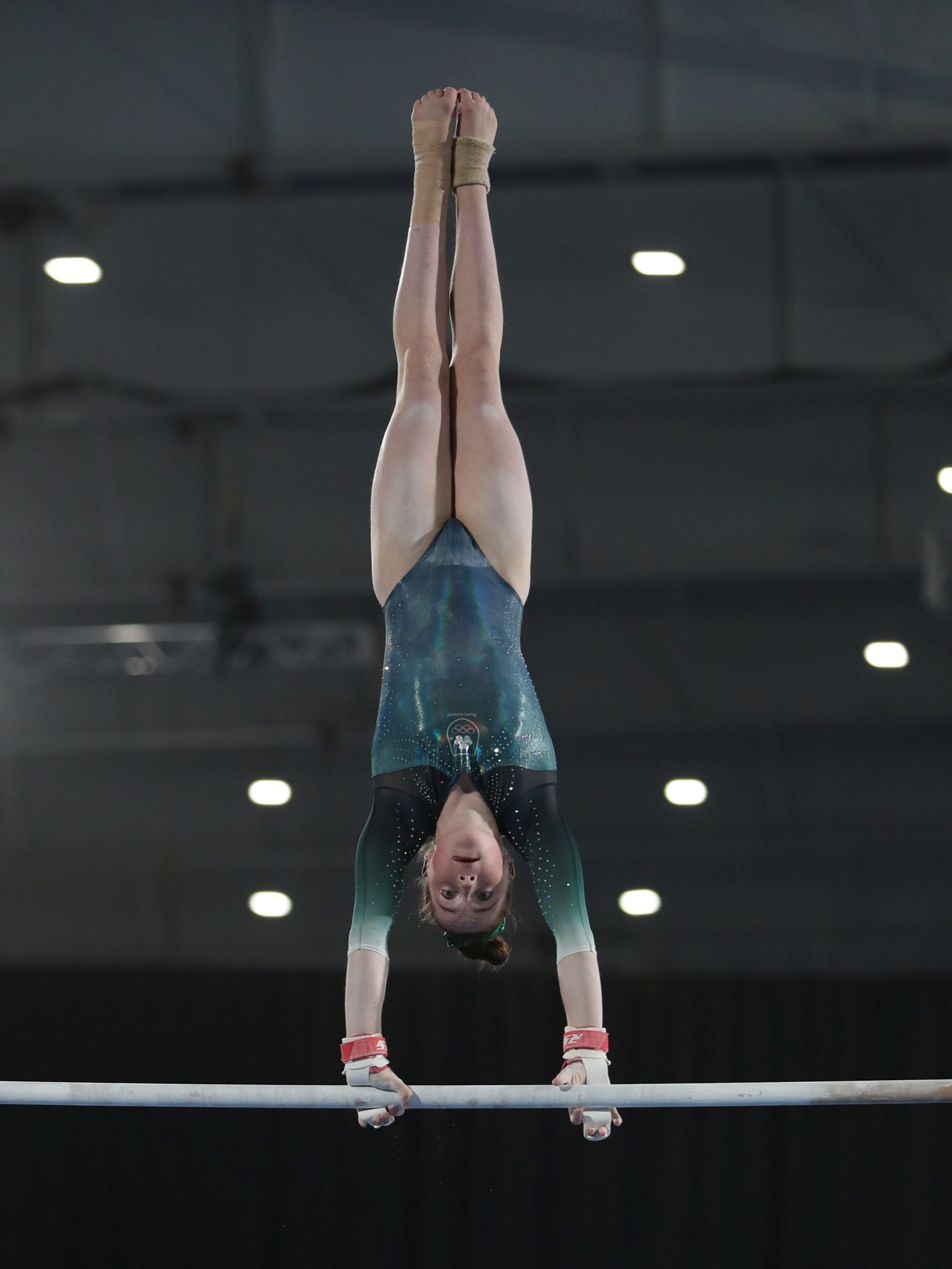
Emma Slevin
