= 2021 Chinese Artistic Gymnastics Championships =

Gymnastics competition in Chengdu, China

- Location: (China) Chengdu, Sichuan
- Start date: May 4, 2021
- End date: May 9, 2021

The 2021 Chinese Artistic Gymnastics Championships were held from May 4-9, 2021 in Chengdu, Sichuan. They also served as the qualifier for the gymnastics event at the 2021 National Games of China.

== Women's medalists ==
Event	Gold	Silver	Bronze
Team	Guangdong (广东省); Chen Yile; Liu Tingting; Luo Rui; Ou Yushan; Sun Xinyi; Wu Ran	Beijing (北京市); Du Siyu; Lin Haibin; Qi Qi; Tang Xijing; Wang Jingying; Wang Yan	Zhejiang (浙江省); Chen Yanfei; Guan Chenchen; Meng Shangrong; Sheng Jingyi; Zhang Qingying; Zhang Xinyi
Individual all-around	Lu Yufei (Henan)	Zhang Jin (Shanghai)	Li Shijia (Sichuan)
Vault	Deng Yalan (Jiangsu)	Liu Jinru (Henan)	Yu Linmin (Fujian)
Uneven bars	Fan Yilin (Shanghai)	Luo Rui (Guangdong); Wei Xiaoyuan (Guangxi)	None Awarded
Balance beam	Li Shijia (Sichuan)	Lu Yufei (Henan)	Tang Xijing (Beijing)
Floor	Lu Yufei (Henan)	Zuo Tong ( Jiangsu)	Shang Chunsong (Hubei)

== Men's medalists ==
Event	Gold	Silver	Bronze
Team	Jiangsu (江苏省); Ma Yue; Shi Cong; Sun Wei; Weng Hao; Yin Dexing; You Hao	Hunan (湖南省); Li Yi; Liao Jiale; Liu Yang; Qu Ruiyang; Yang Jiaxing; Zhang Boheng	Guangxi (广西壮族自治区); Hu Xuwei; Huang Mingqi; Lan Xingyu; Long Mingzhe; Luo Jianlin; Wei Kunyi
Individual all-around	Xiao Ruoteng (Beijing)	Zhang Boheng (Hunan)	Lin Chaopan (Fujian)
Floor	Zhang Boheng (Hunan)	Chen Feng (Hubei)	Mu Jile (Shandong)
Pommel horse	Weng Hao (Jiangsu)	Wang Junwen (Yunnan)	Yao Jianshan (Shanxi)
Rings	Liu Yang (Liaoning)	Lan Xingyu (Guangxi)	You Hao (Jiangsu)
Vault	Huang Mingqi (Guangxi)	Xiang Xudong (Shanxi)	Liu Yang (Hunan)
Parallel bars	Zou Jingyuan (Sichuan)	You Hao (Jiangsu)	Lin Chaopan (Fujian)
Horizontal bar	Ji Lianshen (Guangdong)	Lin Chaopan (Fujian)	Sun Wei (Jiangsu)

== Olympic Training Squads ==
After the competition, gymnasts were named to the Olympic training squads based on one of four criteria: a top-eight all-around placement at these championships, membership on the Chinese teams at the 2019 World Championships, high placements at the FIG World Cup series, or high potential as determined by the national team coaches. These squads included:

	Top 8 All-Around	2019 World Championships	FIG World Cup Series	High Potential
Women	Lu Yufei Zhang Jin Li Shijia Tang Xijing He Licheng Ou Yushan Wei Xiaoyuan Luo Rui	Liu Tingting Chen Yile Qi Qi	Fan Yilin	Guan Chenchen Sun Xinyi
Men	Xiao Ruoteng Zhang Boheng Lin Chaopan Sun Wei Zou Jingyuan Deng Shudi Lan Xingyu Yin Dehang		Liu Yang You Hao Weng Hao Huang Mingqi	
