= Gymnastics at the 2020 Summer Olympics – Women's balance beam =

Olympic gymnastics event

Women's balance beam at the Games of the XXXII Olympiad
- Olympic artistic gymnastics
- Venue: Ariake Gymnastics Centre
- Dates: 25 July 2021 (qualifying); 3 August 2021 (final)
- Competitors: 8 from 6 nations
- Winning score: 14.633 points

Medalists
1st place, gold medalist(s)		Guan Chenchen	China
2nd place, silver medalist(s)		Tang Xijing	China
3rd place, bronze medalist(s)		Simone Biles	United States

The women's balance beam event at the 2020 Summer Olympics was held on 25 July and 3 August 2021 at the Ariake Gymnastics Centre. Approximately 90 gymnasts from 53 nations (of the 98 total gymnasts) are expected to compete on the balance beam in the qualifying round.

Guan Chenchen and Tang Xijing of China won the gold and silver medals, respectively, both earning their first Olympic medals. Simone Biles of the United States, performing a scaled-down routine, repeated her bronze medal performance from 2016 for her seventh Olympic medal. Biles' 32 combined World and Olympic medals tied her with Larisa Latynina of the Soviet Union as the most decorated female gymnasts of all time. It was Biles' only finals appearance after a week where she withdrew from all other events due to mental health concerns. The defending champion, Sanne Wevers, did not qualify for the event.

The medals for the competition were presented by Anita L. Defrantz, United States; IOC Vice-president, and the medalists' bouquets were presented by Vasily Titov, Russia; FIG Vice-president.

== Background ==
This was the 19th appearance of the event, after making its debut at the 1952 Summer Olympics. Defending champion Sanne Wevers of the Netherlands did not qualify to the final; she was instead the third reserve. Simone Biles of the United States, the defending bronze medalist, made her only finals appearance of the Olympics following withdrawals from the team final, the individual all-around final, the vault, uneven bars, and floor event finals due to mental health concerns.

== Qualification ==
A National Olympic Committee (NOC) could enter up to 6 qualified gymnasts: a team of 4 and up to 2 specialists. A total of 98 quota places are allocated to women's gymnastics.

The 12 teams that qualify will be able to send 4 gymnasts in the team competition, for a total of 48 of the 98 quota places. The top three teams at the 2018 World Artistic Gymnastics Championships (the United States, Russia, and China) and the top nine teams (excluding those already qualified) at the 2019 World Artistic Gymnastics Championships (France, Canada, the Netherlands, Great Britain, Italy, Germany, Belgium, Japan, and Spain) earned team qualification places.

The remaining 50 quota places are awarded individually. Each gymnast can only earn one place, except that gymnasts that competed with a team that qualified are eligible to earn a second place through the 2020 All Around World Cup Series. Some of the individual events are open to gymnasts from NOCs with qualified teams, while others are not. These places are filled through various criteria based on the 2019 World Championships, the 2020 FIG Artistic Gymnastics World Cup series, continental championships, a host guarantee, and a Tripartite Commission invitation.

Each of the 98 qualified gymnasts are eligible for the balance beam competition, but many gymnasts do not compete in each of the apparatus events.

The COVID-19 pandemic delayed many of the events for qualifying for gymnastics. The 2018 and 2019 World Championships were completed on time, but many of the World Cup series events were delayed into 2021.

== Competition format ==
The top 8 qualifiers in the qualification phase (limit two per NOC) advance to the apparatus final. The finalists performed on the balance beam again. Qualification scores were then ignored, with only final round scores counting.

== Schedule ==
The competition will be held over two days, 25 July and 3 August. The qualifying round (for all women's gymnastics events) was the first day; the balance beam final is on the third and final day of individual event finals.

Date	Time	Round	Subdivision
25 July	10:00	Qualification	Subdivision 1
25 July	11:50	Qualification	Subdivision 2
25 July	15:10	Qualification	Subdivision 3
25 July	17:05	Qualification	Subdivision 4
25 July	20:20	Qualification	Subdivision 5
3 August	17:50	Final	–
All times are local time (UTC+09:00).

== Results ==
=== Qualifying ===
Rank	Gymnast	D Score	E Score	Pen.	Total	Results
1	Guan Chenchen (CHN)	6.9	8.033		14.933	Q
2	Tang Xijing (CHN)	6.2	8.133		14.333	Q
3	Sunisa Lee (USA)	6.2	8.000		14.200	Q
4	Larisa Iordache (ROU)	6.2	7.933		14.133	Q W
5	Lu Yufei (CHN)	6.0	8.100		14.100	–
6	Ellie Black (CAN)	6.3	7.800		14.100	Q
7	Simone Biles (USA)	6.5	7.566		14.066	Q
8	Vladislava Urazova (ROC)	5.8	8.200		14.000	Q
9	Flávia Saraiva (BRA)	5.9	8.066		13.966	Q
10	Zhang Jin (CHN)	6.0	7.966		13.966	–
11	Ou Yushan (CHN)	5.9	8.033		13.933	–
12	Urara Ashikawa (JPN)	5.9	8.000		13.900	R1 S
13	Viktoria Listunova (ROC)	5.6	8.266		13.866	R2
14	Sanne Wevers (NED)	5.8	8.066		13.866	R3

Reserves

The reserves for the women's balance beam final were:

1. Urara Ashikawa (JPN) – called up after Larisa Iordache's withdrawal
2. Viktoria Listunova (ROC)
3. Sanne Wevers (NED)

Only two gymnasts from each country may advance to the event final. Gymnasts who did not qualify for the final because of the quota, but had high enough scores to do so were:

- Lu Yufei (CHN)

=== Final ===
Rank	Gymnast	D Score	E Score	Pen.	Total
1st place, gold medalist(s)	Guan Chenchen (CHN)	6.6	8.033		14.633
2nd place, silver medalist(s)	Tang Xijing (CHN)	6.0	8.233		14.233
3rd place, bronze medalist(s)	Simone Biles (USA)	6.1	7.900		14.000
4	Ellie Black (CAN)	6.2	7.666		13.866
5	Sunisa Lee (USA)	6.4	7.466		13.866
6	Urara Ashikawa (JPN)	5.9	7.833		13.733
7	Flávia Saraiva (BRA)	5.7	7.433		13.133
8	Vladislava Urazova (ROC)	5.0	7.733		12.733

Fourth- and fifth-place finishers Ellie Black and Sunisa Lee, respectively, finished with identical scores of 13.866. According the FIG's tie-breaking procedure, Black earned the higher placement due to higher E-score (7.666 vs 7.466).
