= Gymnastics at the 2020 Summer Olympics – Women's uneven bars =

Olympic gymnastics event

Women's uneven bars at the Games of the XXXII Olympiad
- Olympic artistic gymnastics
- Venue: Ariake Gymnastics Centre
- Dates: 25 July 2021 (qualifying); 1 August 2021 (final)
- Competitors: 8 from 6 nations
- Winning score: 15.200

Medalists
1st place, gold medalist(s)		Nina Derwael	Belgium
2nd place, silver medalist(s)		Anastasia Ilyankova	ROC
3rd place, bronze medalist(s)		Sunisa Lee	United States

The women's uneven bars event at the 2020 Summer Olympics was held on 25 July and 1 August 2021 at the Ariake Gymnastics Centre. Approximately 90 gymnasts from 53 nations (of the 98 total gymnasts) competed on the uneven bars in the qualifying round.

Two-time world champion and favorite Nina Derwael of Belgium won the competition to earn Belgium's first Olympic gold medal in artistic gymnastics. Derwael's medal was also the first gold for Belgium at the 2020 Olympics. ROC's Anastasia Ilyankova earned silver for her first Olympic medal. Sunisa Lee of the United States took the bronze, her third medal of the 2020 Olympics.

The medals for the competition were presented by Baron Pierre-Olivier Becker-Vieujant, Belgium; IOC Member, and the medalists' bouquets were presented by Kim Dong-min, South Korea; FIG Executive Committee Member.

== Background ==
This was the 19th appearance of the event, after making its debut at the 1952 Summer Olympics. Two-time defending champion Aliya Mustafina of Russia retired prior to the 2020 Summer Olympics.

== Qualification ==
A National Olympic Committee (NOC) could enter up to 6 qualified gymnasts: a team of 4 and up to 2 specialists. A total of 98 quota places are allocated to women's gymnastics.

The 12 teams that qualify will be able to send 4 gymnasts in the team competition, for a total of 48 of the 98 quota places. The top three teams at the 2018 World Artistic Gymnastics Championships (the United States, Russia, and China) and the top nine teams (excluding those already qualified) at the 2019 World Artistic Gymnastics Championships (France, Canada, the Netherlands, Great Britain, Italy, Germany, Belgium, Japan, and Spain) earned team qualification places.

The remaining 50 quota places are awarded individually. Each gymnast can only earn one place, except that gymnasts that competed with a team that qualified are eligible to earn a second place through the 2020 All Around World Cup Series. Some of the individual events are open to gymnasts from NOCs with qualified teams, while others are not. These places are filled through various criteria based on the 2019 World Championships, the 2020 FIG Artistic Gymnastics World Cup series, continental championships, a host guarantee, and a Tripartite Commission invitation.

Each of the 98 qualified gymnasts are eligible for the uneven bars competition, but many gymnasts do not compete in each of the apparatus events.

The COVID-19 pandemic delayed many of the events for qualifying for gymnastics. The 2018 and 2019 World Championships were completed on time, but many of the World Cup series events were delayed into 2021.

== Competition format ==
The top 8 qualifiers in the qualification phase (limit two per NOC) advanced to the apparatus final. The finalists performed on the uneven bars again. Qualification scores were then ignored, with only final round scores counting.

== Schedule ==
The competition was held over two days, 25 July and 1 August. The qualifying round (for all women's gymnastics events) was the first day with the uneven bars final on the first day of individual event finals.

Date	Time	Round	Subdivision
25 July	10:00	Qualification	Subdivision 1
25 July	11:50	Qualification	Subdivision 2
25 July	15:10	Qualification	Subdivision 3
25 July	17:05	Qualification	Subdivision 4
25 July	20:20	Qualification	Subdivision 5
1 August	19:30	Final	–
All times are local time (UTC+09:00).

== Results ==
=== Qualifying ===
Rank	Gymnast	D Score	E Score	Pen.	Total	Results
1	Nina Derwael (BEL)	6.7	8.666		15.366	Q
2	Sunisa Lee (USA)	6.6	8.600		15.200	Q
3	Anastasia Ilyankova (ROC)	6.4	8.566		14.966	Q
4	Angelina Melnikova (ROC)	6.3	8.633		14.933	Q
5	Vladislava Urazova (ROC)	6.3	8.566		14.866	–
6	Viktoria Listunova (ROC)	6.4	8.366		14.766	–
7	Lu Yufei (CHN)	6.2	8.500		14.700	Q
7	Elisabeth Seitz (GER)	6.2	8.500		14.700	Q
9	Fan Yilin (CHN)	6.3	8.300		14.600	Q
10	Simone Biles (USA)	6.2	8.366		14.566	Q W
11	Mélanie de Jesus dos Santos (FRA)	6.4	8.166		14.566	R1 S
12	Jonna Adlerteg (SWE)	6.3	8.233		14.533	R2
13	Tang Xijing (CHN)	6.0	8.433		14.433	–
14	Zsófia Kovács (HUN)	6.3	8.133		14.433	R3

Reserves

The reserves for the women's uneven bars final were:

1. Mélanie de Jesus dos Santos (FRA) – called up after Simone Biles' withdrawal
2. Jonna Adlerteg (SWE)
3. Zsófia Kovács (HUN)

Only two gymnasts from each country may advance to the event final. Gymnasts who did not qualify for the final because of the quota, but had high enough scores to do so were:

- Vladislava Urazova (ROC)
- Viktoria Listunova (ROC)

=== Final ===
Rank	Gymnast	D Score	E Score	Pen.	Total
1st place, gold medalist(s)	Nina Derwael (BEL)	6.7	8.500		15.200
2nd place, silver medalist(s)	Anastasia Ilyankova (ROC)	6.3	8.533		14.833
3rd place, bronze medalist(s)	Sunisa Lee (USA)	6.2	8.300		14.500
4	Lu Yufei (CHN)	6.0	8.400		14.400
5	Elisabeth Seitz (GER)	6.2	8.200		14.400
6	Mélanie de Jesus dos Santos (FRA)	6.1	7.933		14.033
7	Fan Yilin (CHN)	6.4	7.500		13.900
8	Angelina Melnikova (ROC)	5.9	7.166		13.066

Fourth- and fifth-place finishers Lu Yufei and Elisabeth Seitz, respectively, finished with identical scores of 14.400. According the FIG's tie-breaking procedure, Lu earned the higher placement due to higher E-score (8.400 vs 8.200).
