= Gymnastics at the 2018 Summer Youth Olympics – Girls' artistic individual all-around =

Women's artistic individual all-around at the III Summer Youth Olympic Games
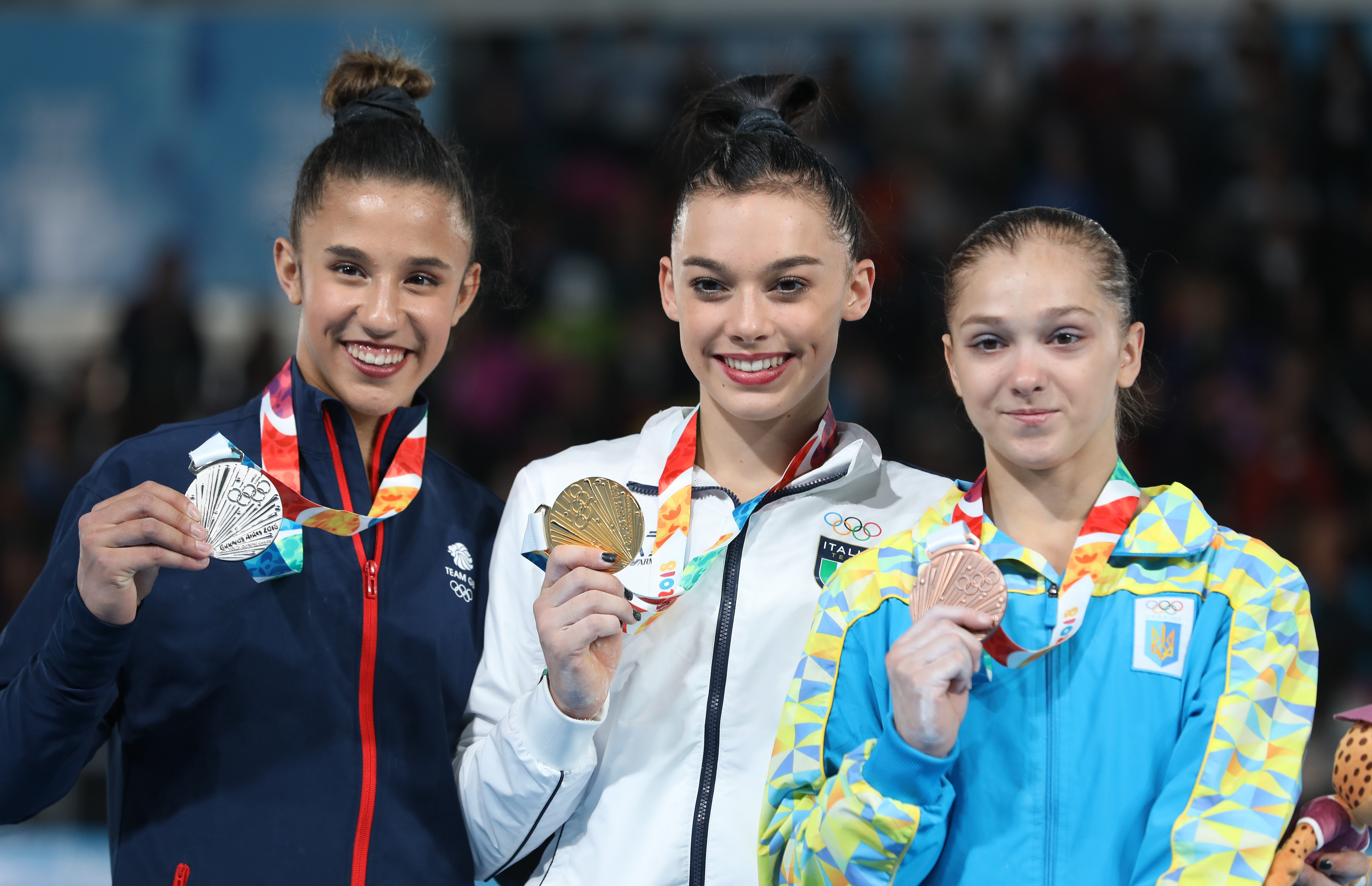
- Medalists Morgan (left), Villa (center), and Bachynska (right)
- Venue: America Pavilion
- Date: October 12
- Competitors: 18 from 18 nations
- Winning total: 54.066 points

Medalists
1st place, gold medalist(s)		Giorgia Villa	Italy
2nd place, silver medalist(s)		Amelie Morgan	Great Britain
3rd place, bronze medalist(s)		Anastasiia Bachynska	Ukraine

The women's artistic gymnastics all-around at the 2018 Summer Youth Olympics was held at the America Pavilion on October 12.

== Qualification ==
Qualification took place over four days from October 7-10. Anastasiia Bachynska from Ukraine qualified in first, followed by Italy's Giorgia Villa and Tang Xijing of China.

The reserves were:

1. Laura Rocha (BRA)
2. Aliaksandra Varabyova (BLR)
3. Chiharu Yamada (JPN)
4. Phạm Như Phương (VIE)

== Medalists ==
	Gold	Silver	Bronze
All-around	Giorgia Villa (ITA)	Amelie Morgan (GBR)	Anastasiia Bachynska (UKR)

== Results ==
Oldest and youngest competitors

	Name	Country	Date of birth	Age
Youngest	Ksenia Klimenko	Russia	1 November 2003	14 years, 11 months and 11 days
Oldest	Tang Xijing	China	3 January 2003	15 years, 9 months and 9 days

Rank	Gymnast	Vault (gymnastics)	Uneven bars	Balance beam	Floor (gymnastics)	Total
1st place, gold medalist(s)	Giorgia Villa (ITA)	14.566	14.000	12.300	13.200	54.066
2nd place, silver medalist(s)	Amelie Morgan (GBR)	13.800	13.366	13.200	13.066	53.432
3rd place, bronze medalist(s)	Anastasiia Bachynska (UKR)	13.866	13.433	12.933	12.100	52.332
4	Tang Xijing (CHN)	13.466	13.966	11.766	13.066	52.264
5	Ksenia Klimenko (RUS)	13.000	13.200	11.966	13.033	51.199
6	Emma Slevin (IRL)	13.433	12.700	12.233	12.133	50.499
7	Tonya Paulsson (SWE)	12.833	12.500	11.833	12.233	49.399
8	Kate Sayer (AUS)	13.433	12.333	11.133	12.400	49.299
9	Ada Hautala (FIN)	12.916	11.966	12.233	12.033	49.148
10	Emma Spence (CAN)	13.900	12.666	10.900	11.666	49.132
11	Alba Petisco (ESP)	13.333	12.200	11.633	11.966	49.132
12	Lisa Zimmermann (GER)	13.483	12.466	10.633	12.366	48.948
13	Lee Yun-seo (KOR)	12.333	13.133	10.833	12.600	48.899
14	Csenge Bácskay (HUN)	13.500	12.133	11.100	12.033	48.766
15	Ana-Maria Puiu (ROU)	13.133	11.933	11.600	11.700	48.366
16	Eglė Stalinkevičiūtė (LTU)	12.933	11.733	11.233	12.200	48.099
17	Camila Montoya (CRC)	12.733	11.333	10.566	11.666	46.298
18	Zeina Ibrahim (EGY)	12.700	9.250	10.100	10.933	42.983

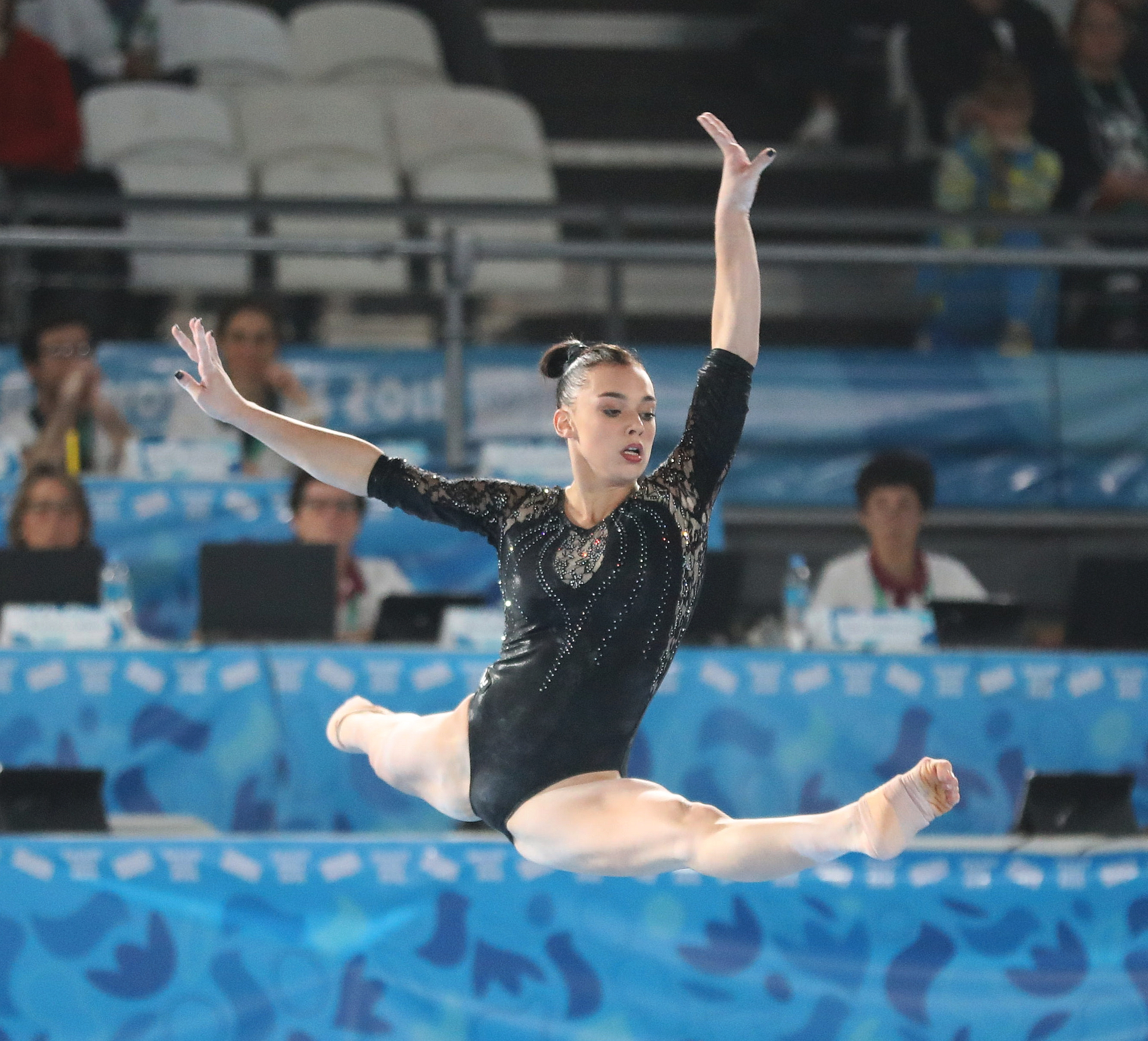
Giorgia Villa on floor

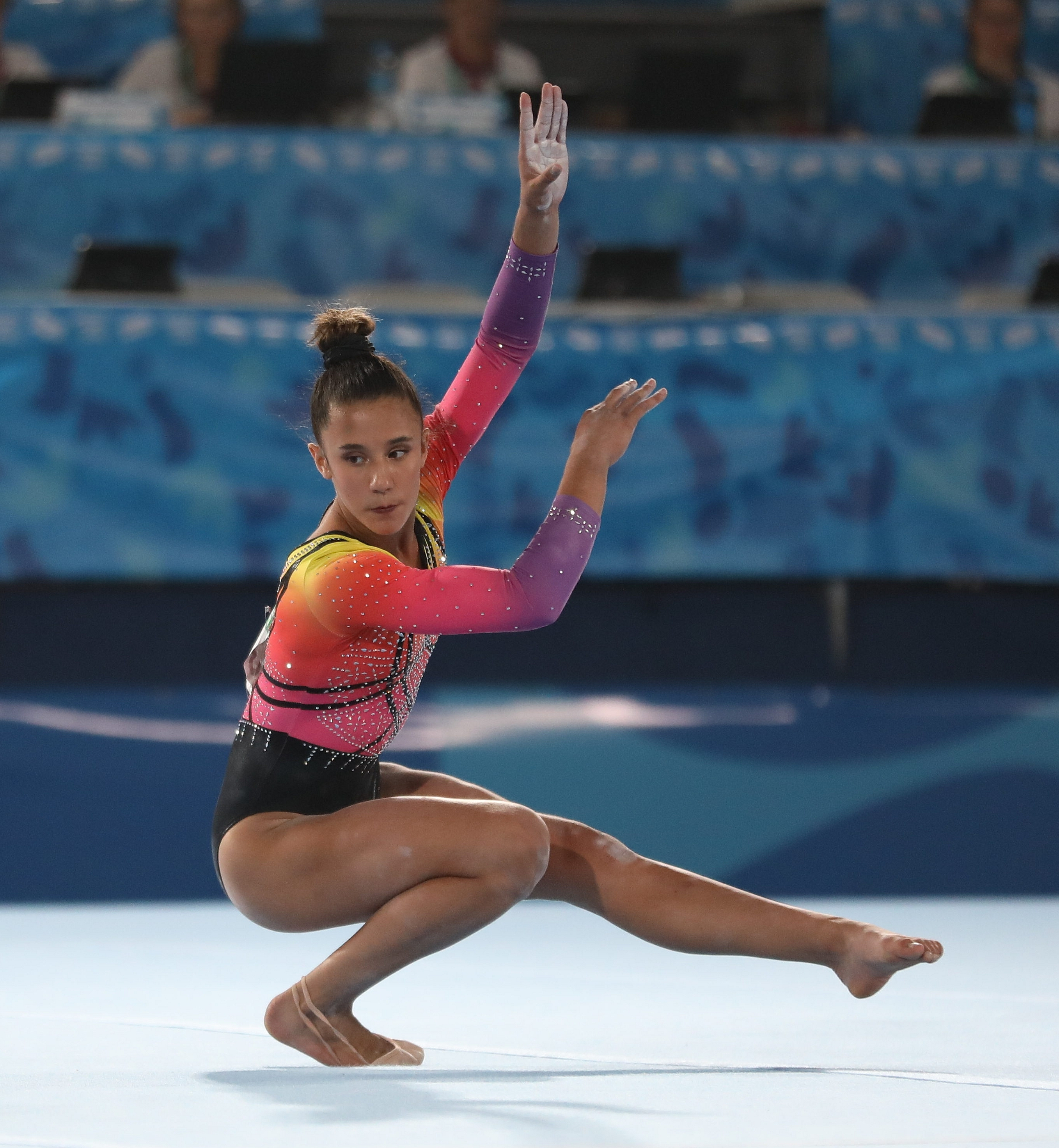
Amelie Morgan on floor

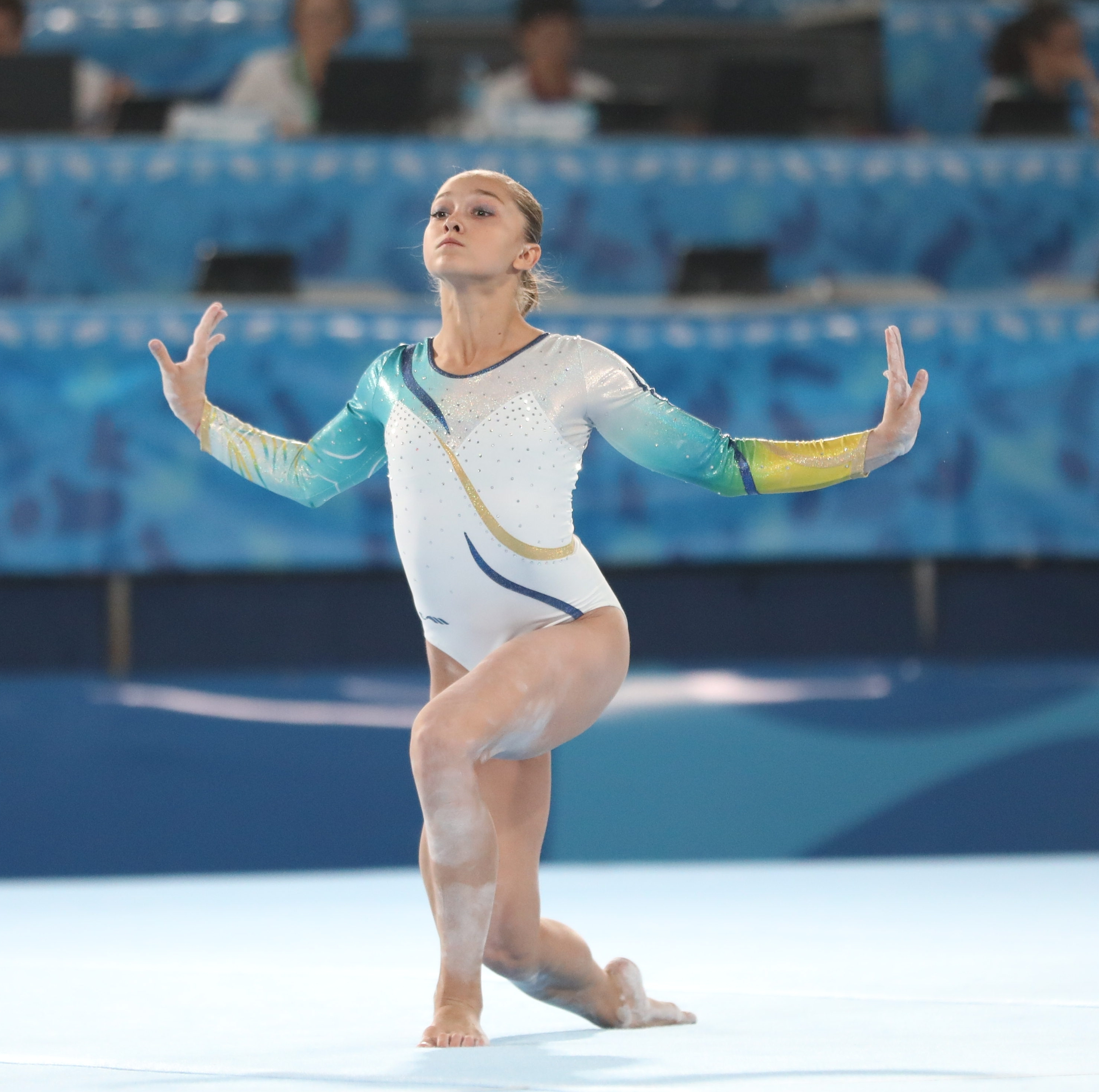
Anastasiia Bachynska on floor

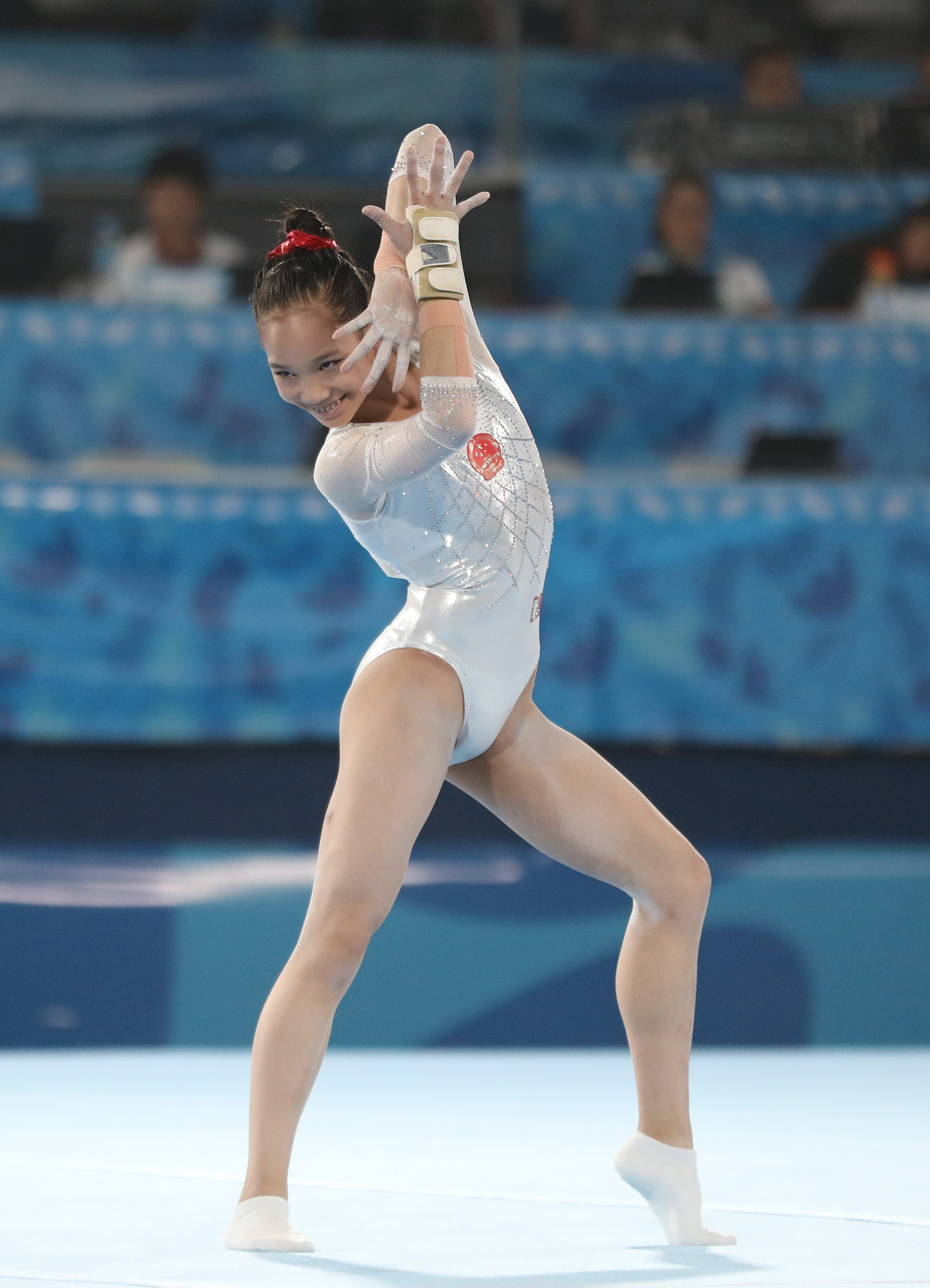
Tang Xijing on floor

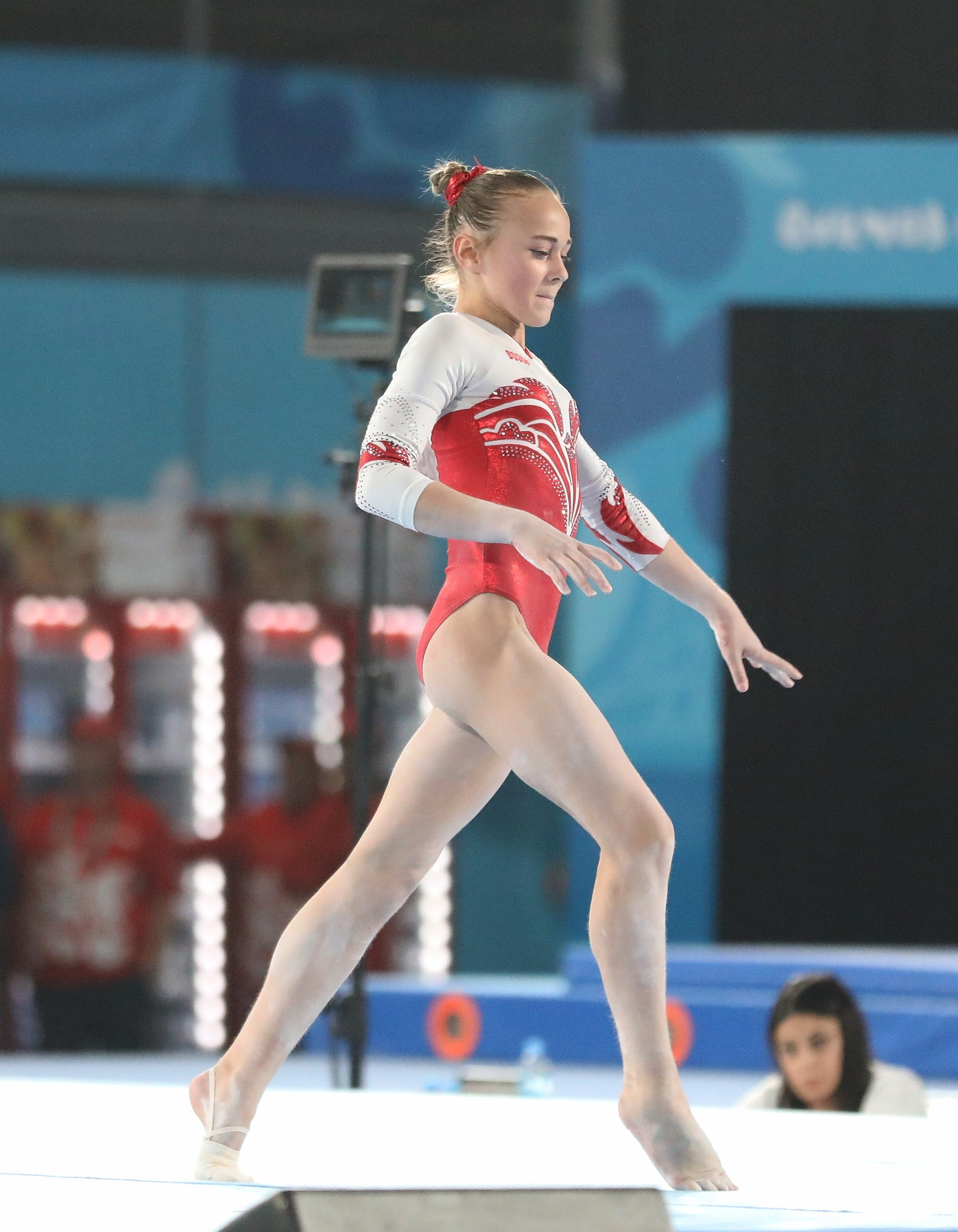
Ksenia Klimenko on floor

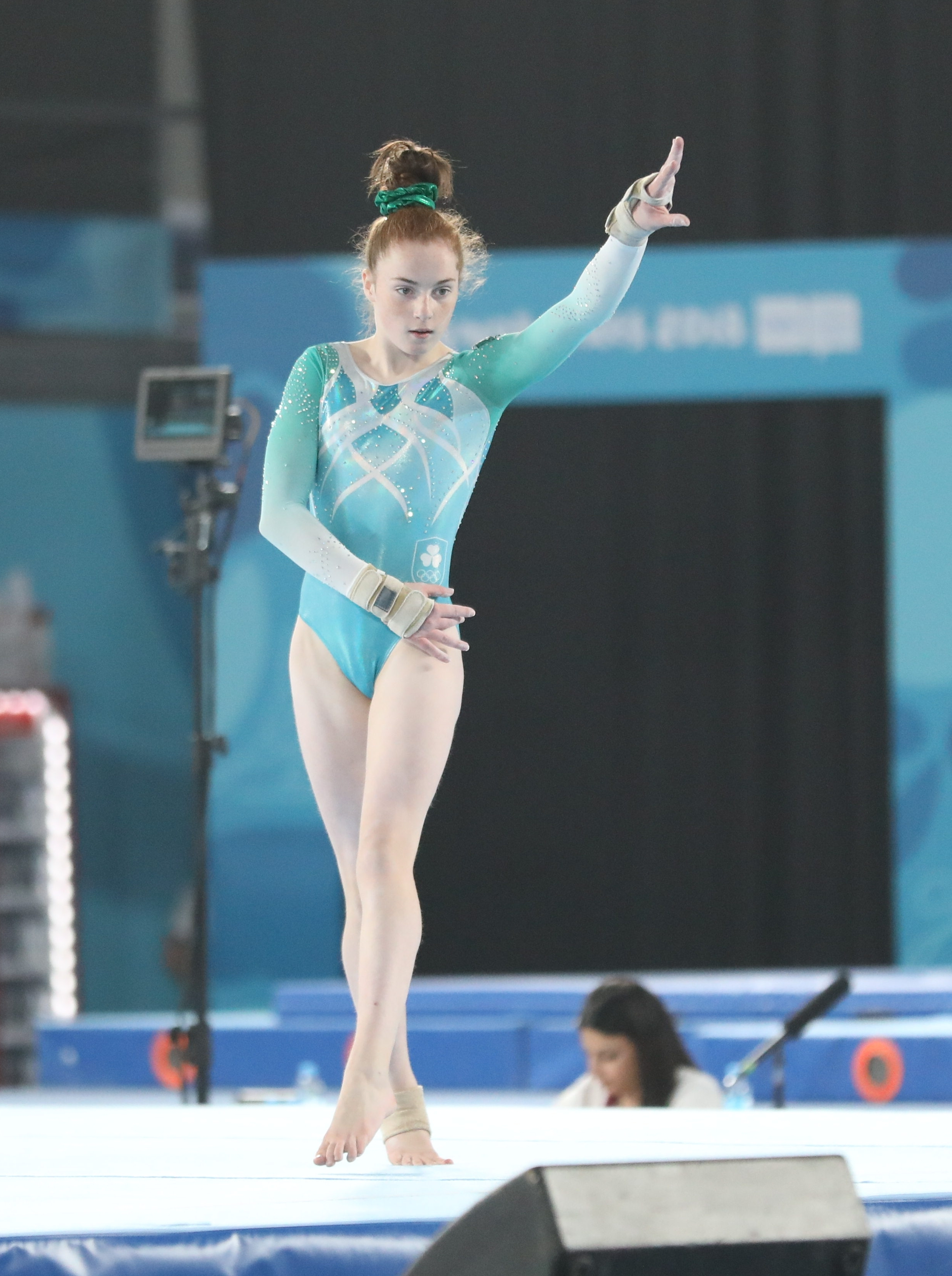
Emma Slevin on floor

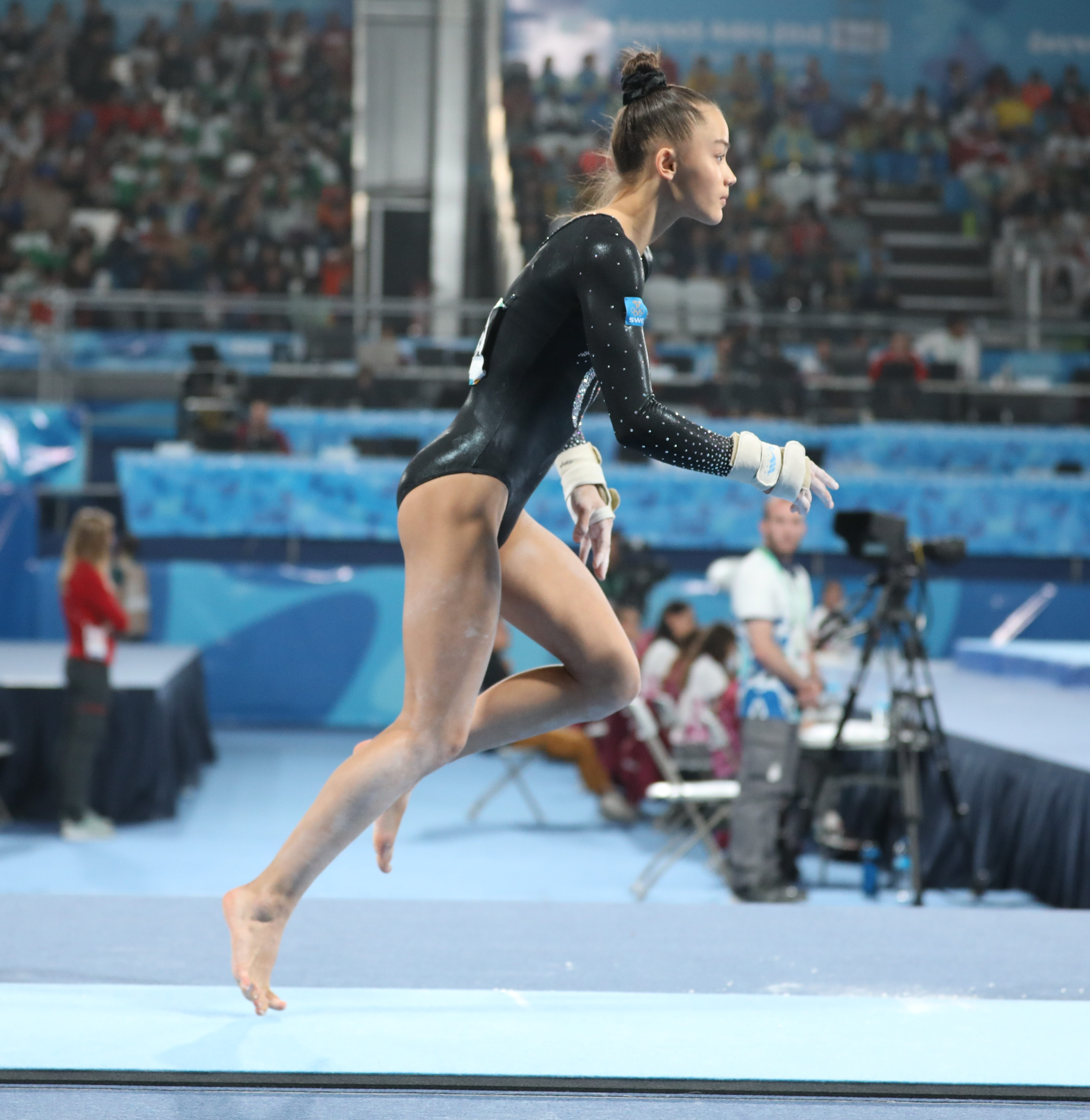
Tonya Paulsson on vault

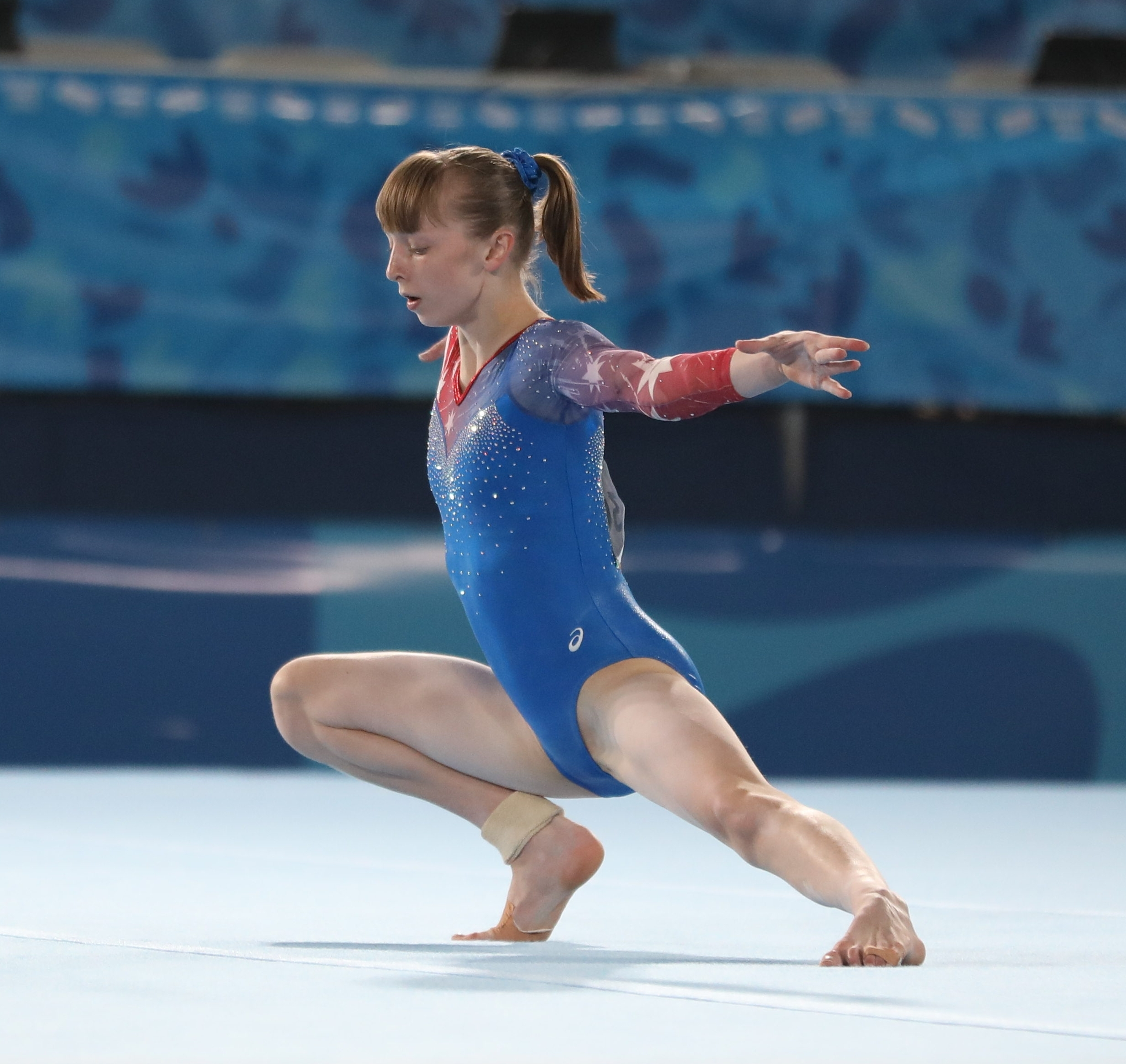
Kate Sayer on floor

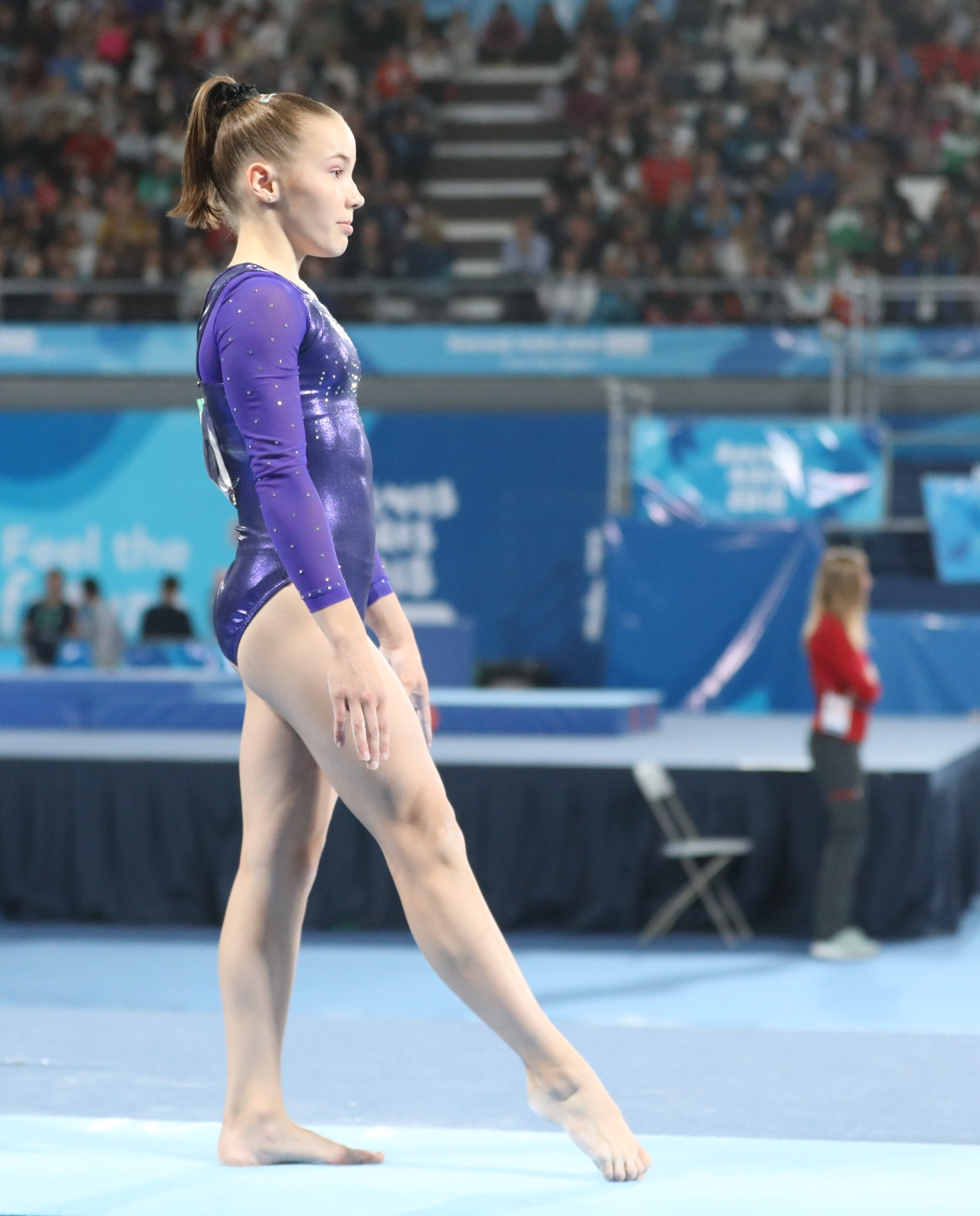
Ada Hautala on vault

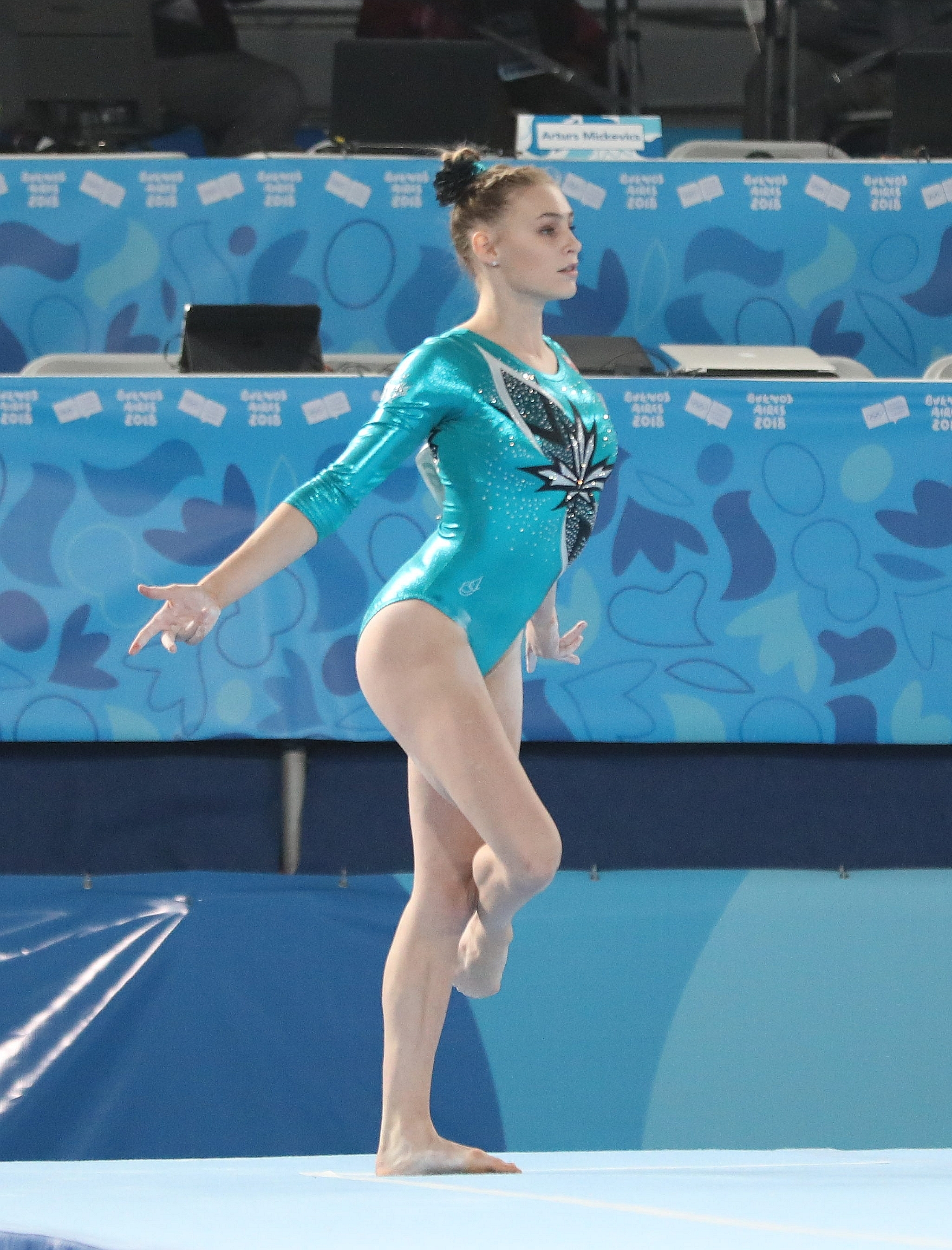
Emma Spence on floor

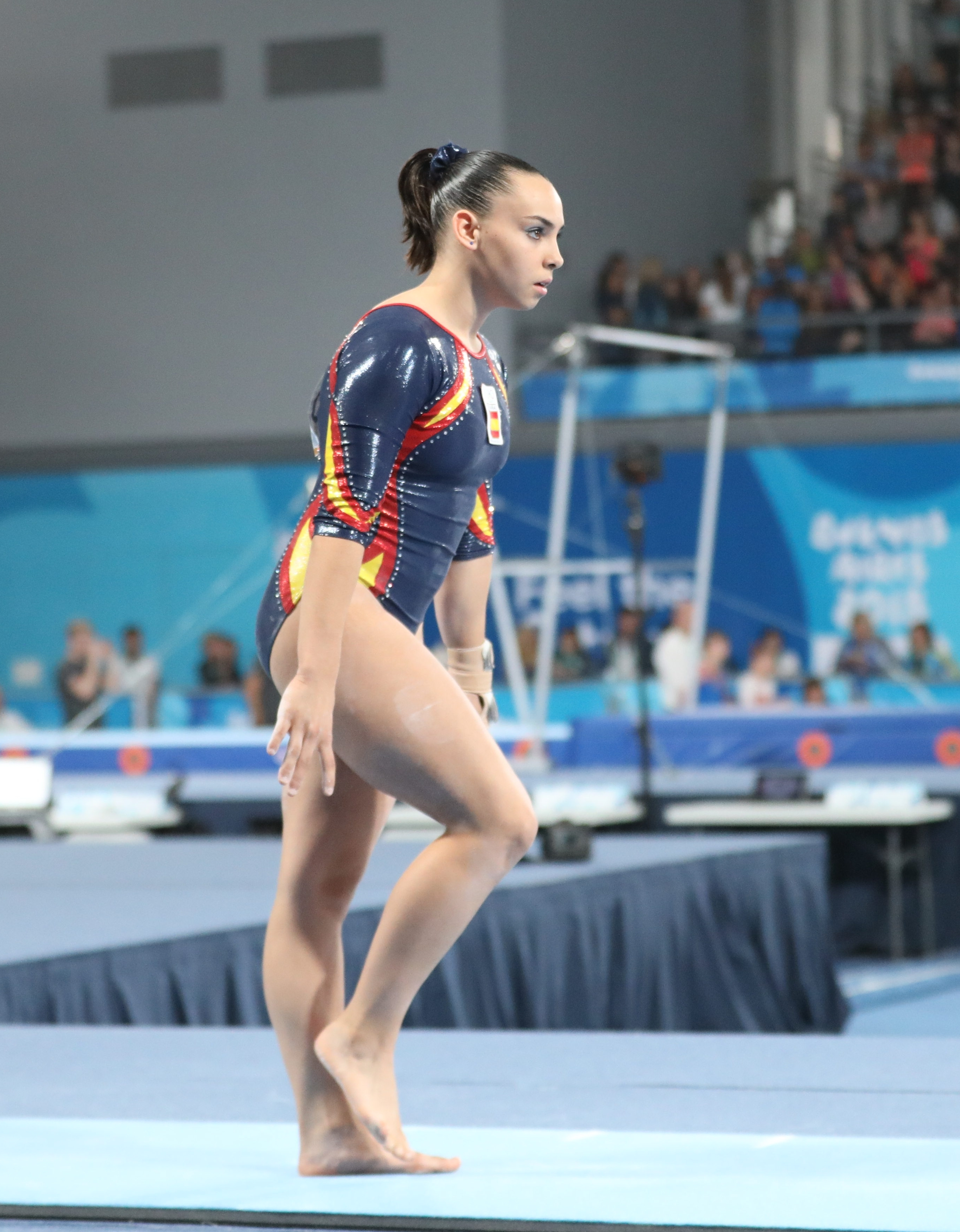
Alba Petisco on vault

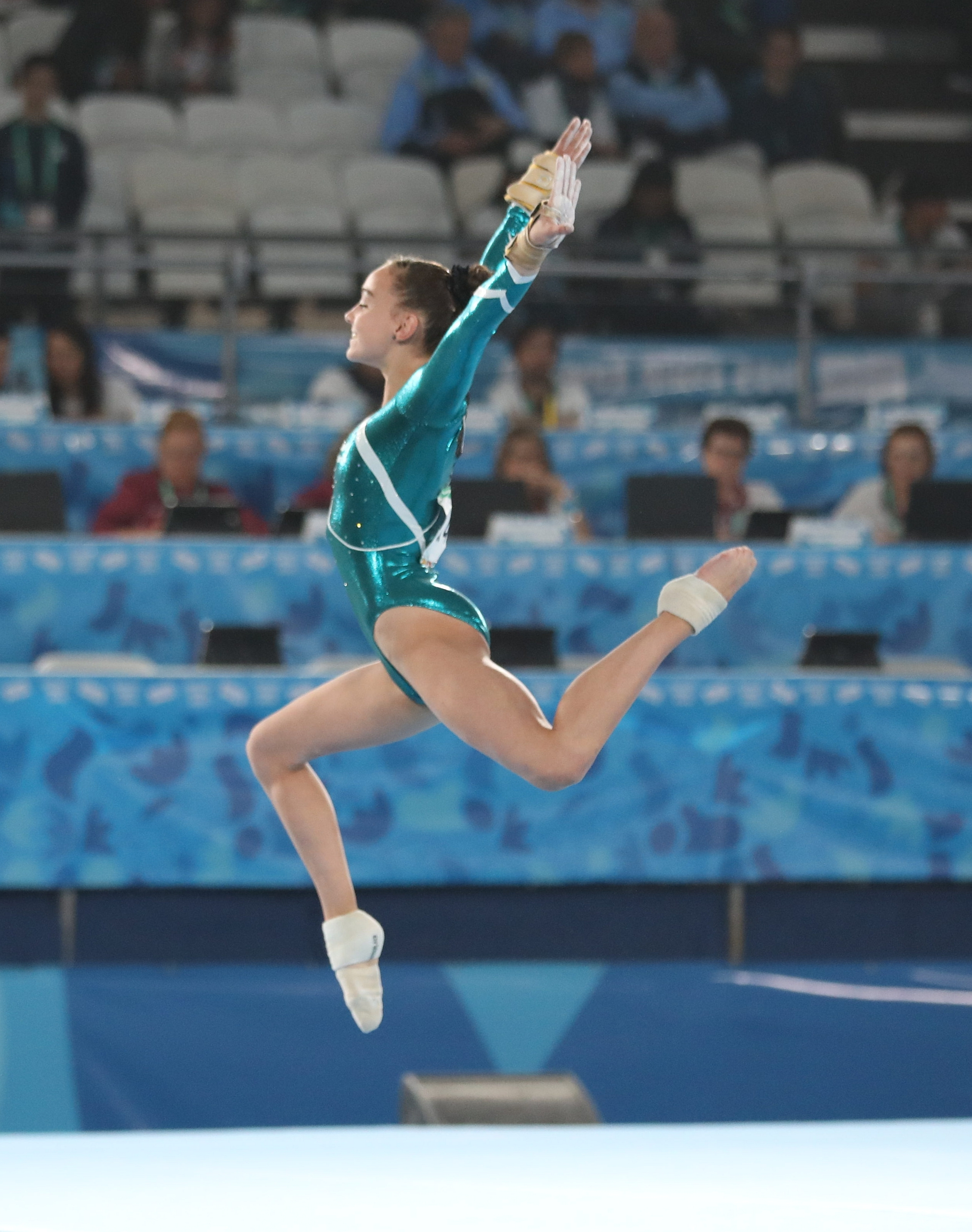
Lisa Zimmermann on floor

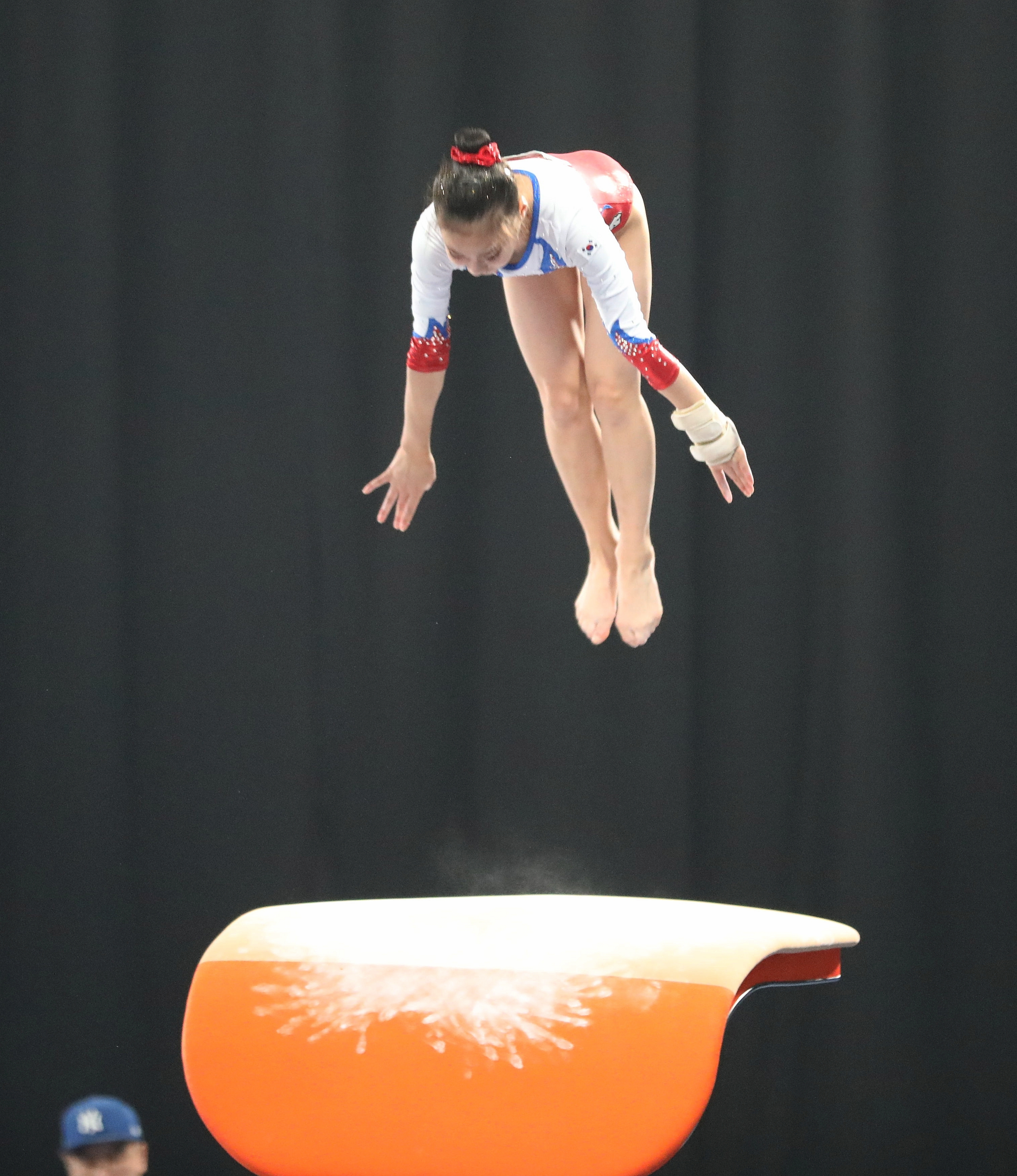
Lee Yun-seo on vault

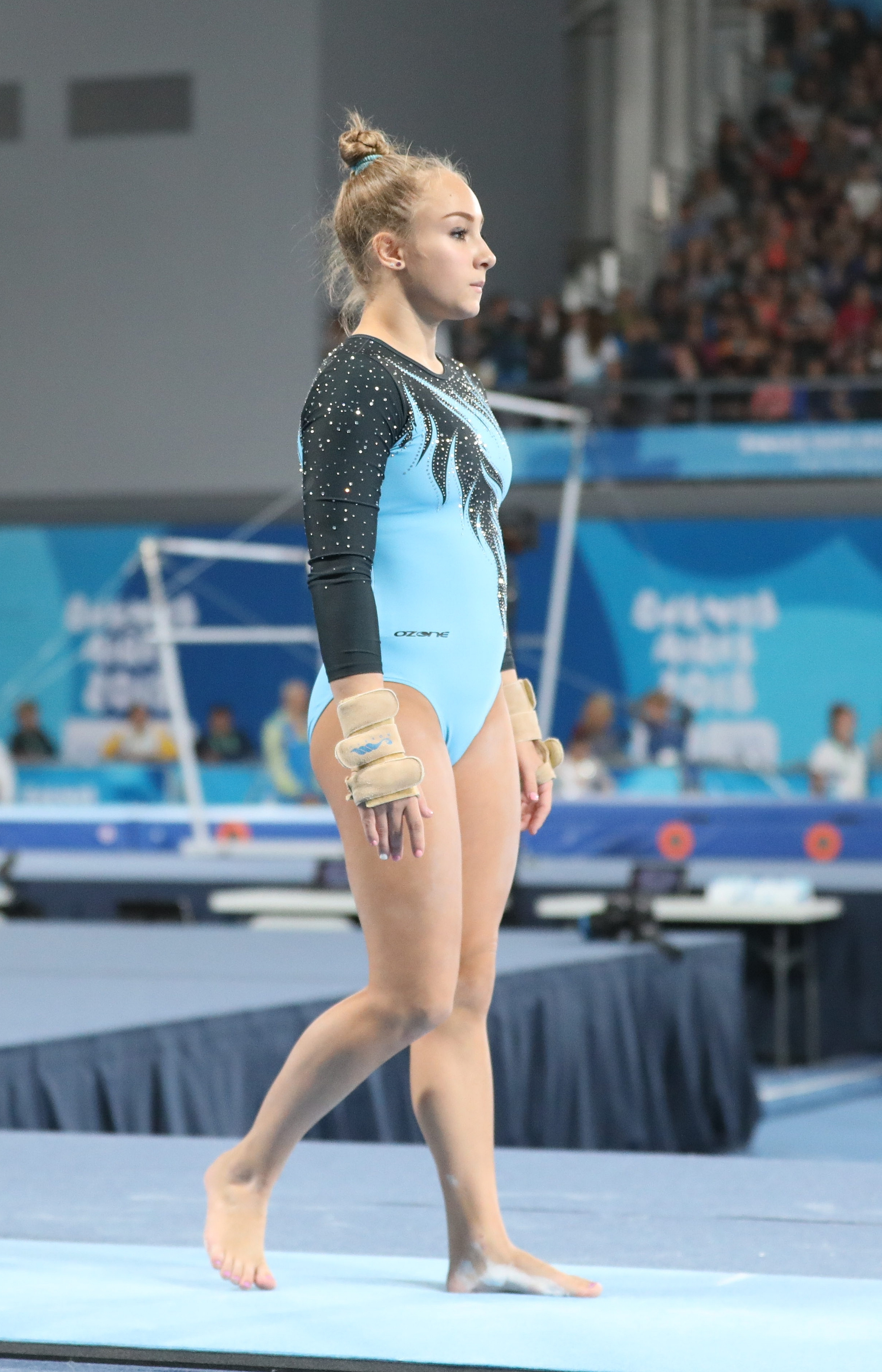
Csenge Bácskay on vault

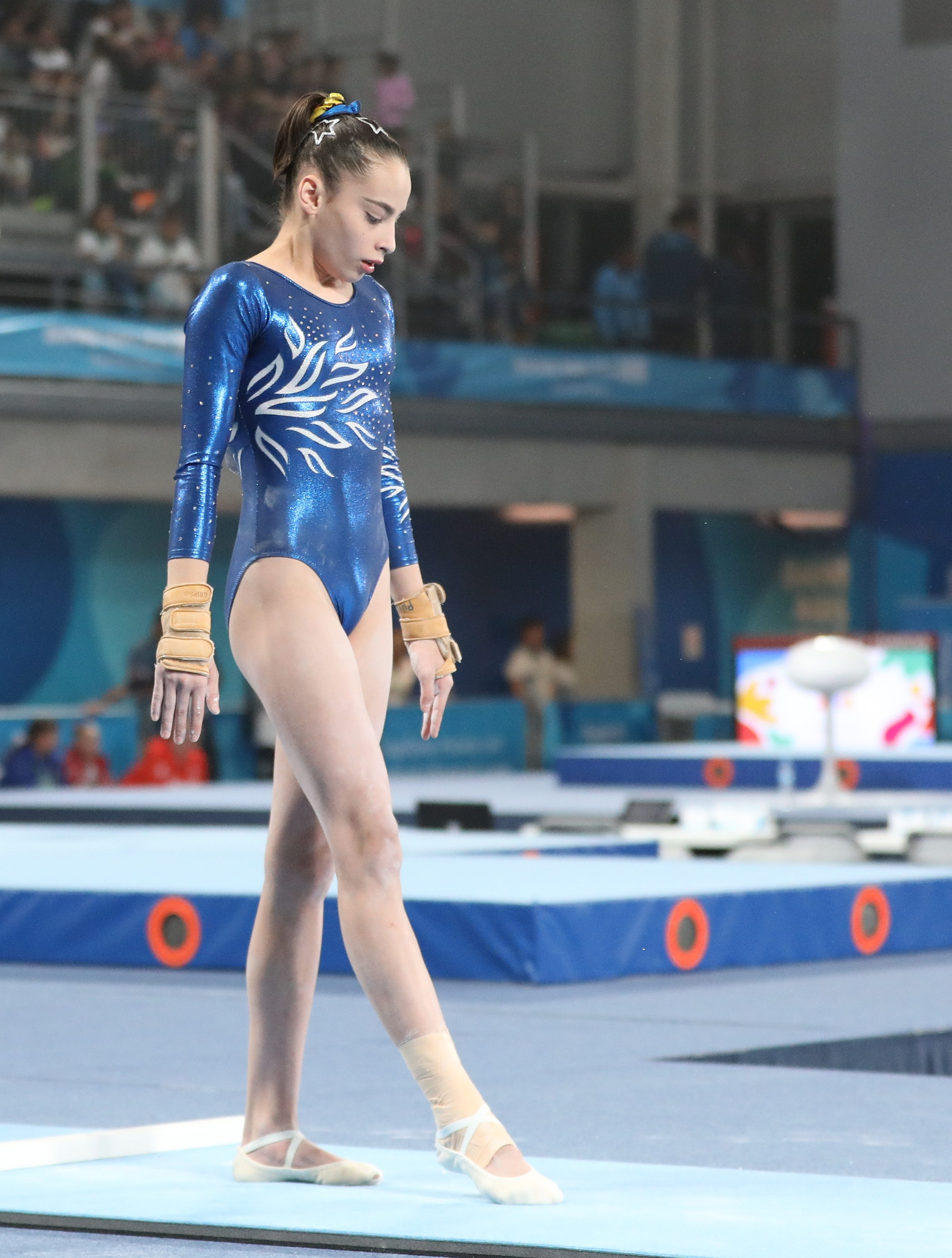
Ana-Maria Puiu on vault

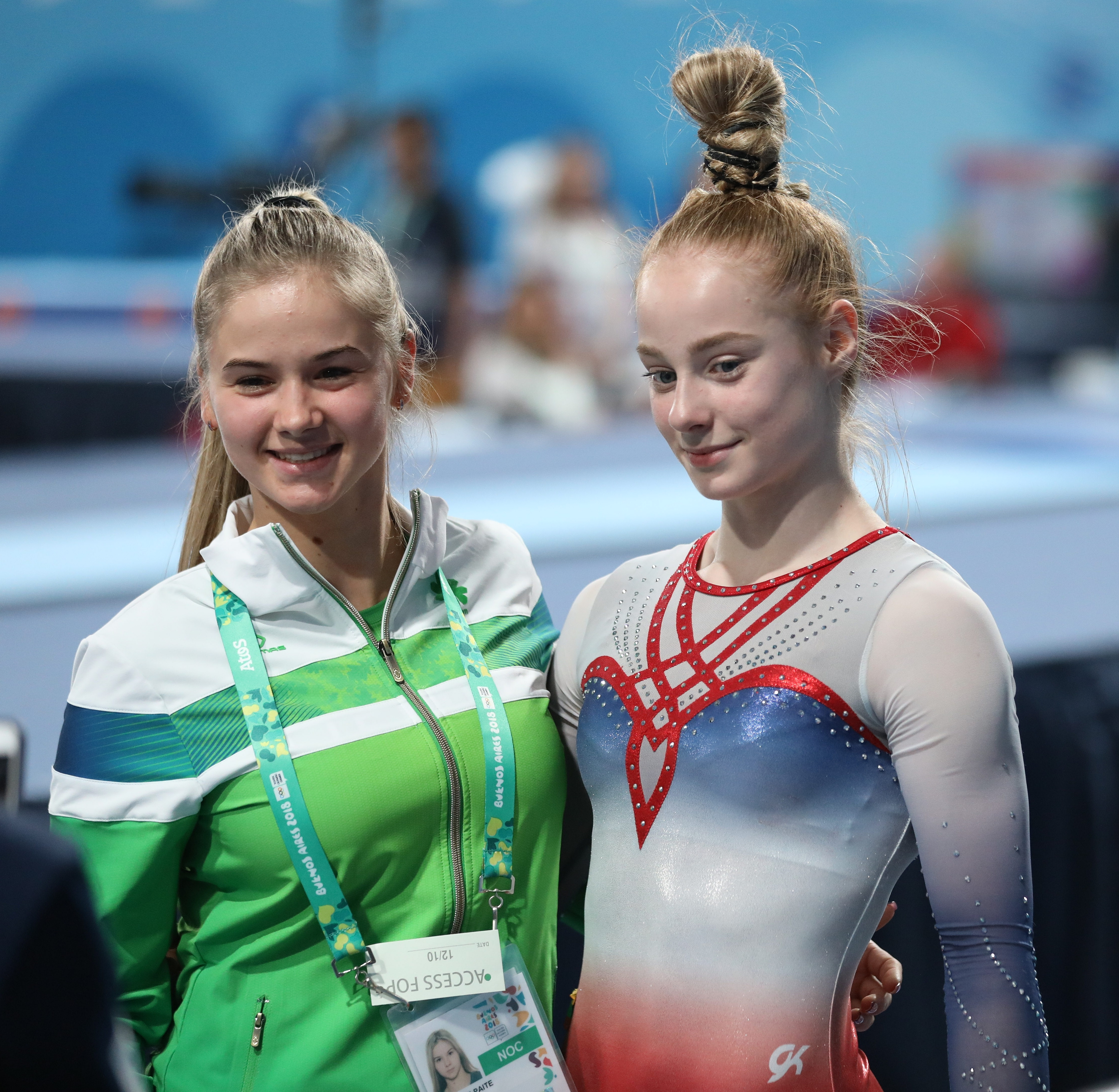
Eglė Stalinkevičiūtė with coach

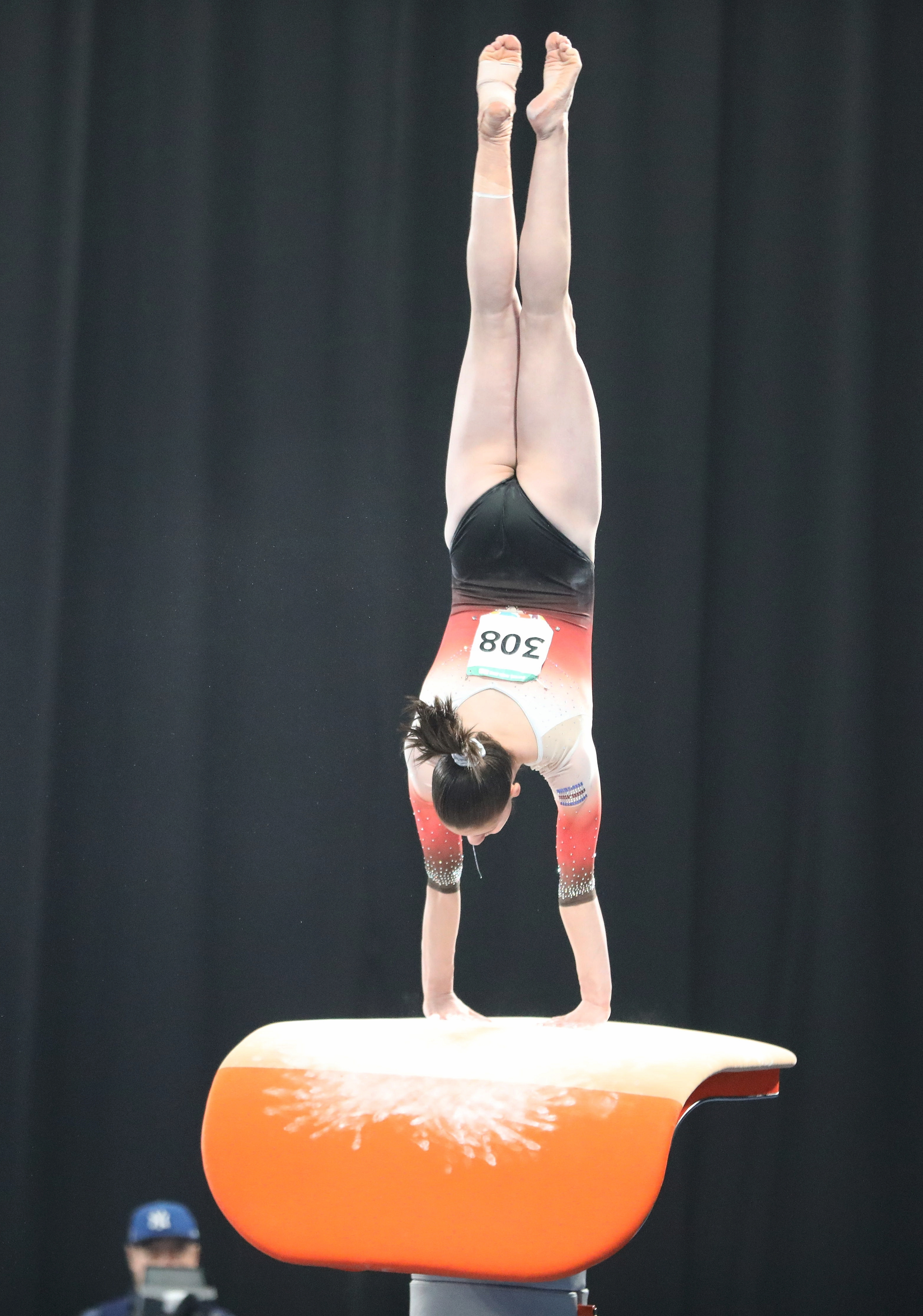
Camila Montoya on vault

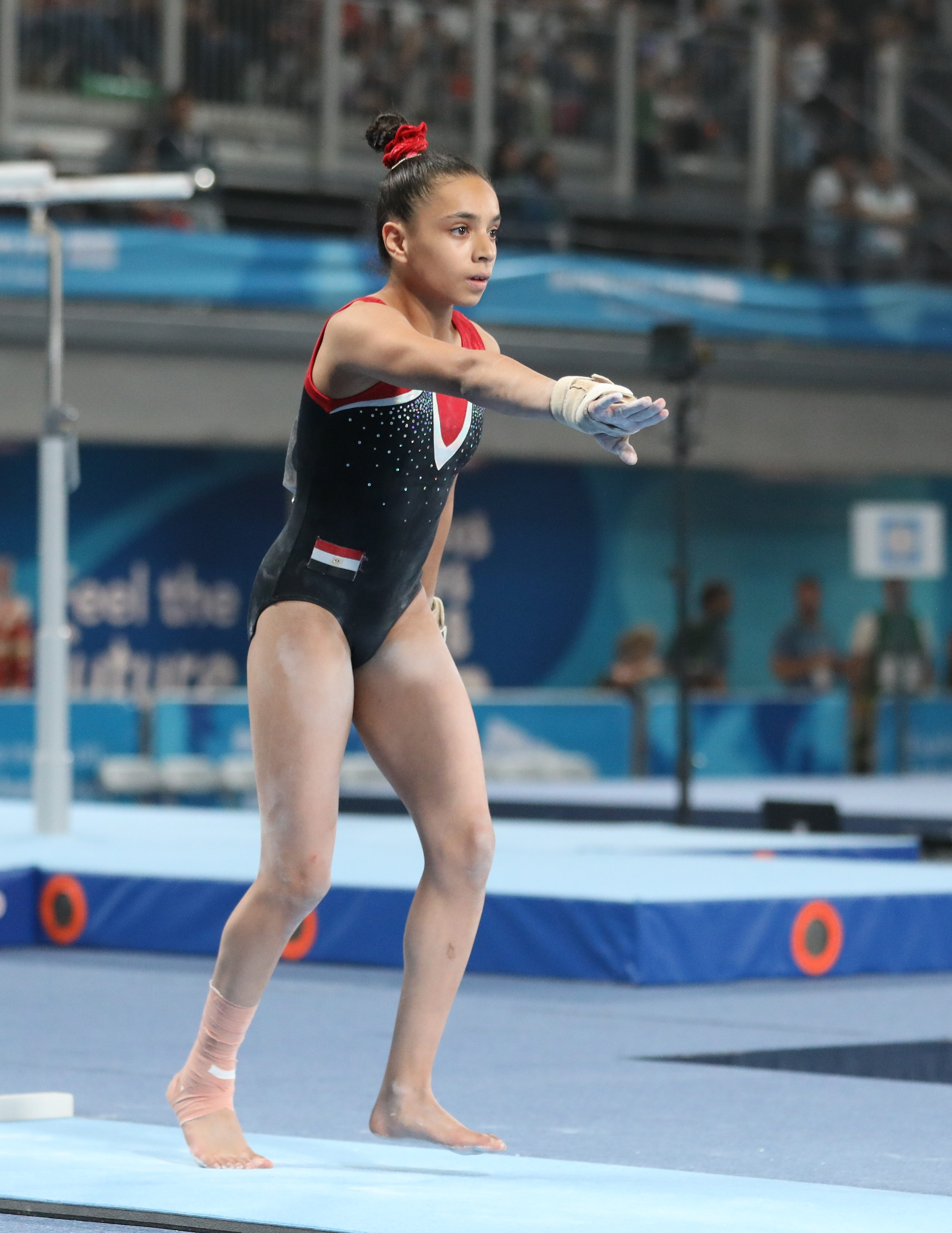
Zeina Ibrahim on vault
