= Lu Yufei =

Chinese artistic gymnast

Lu Yufei 芦玉菲
- Full name: Lu Yufei
- Nicknames: Feifei, Lu Yu
- Born: 28 March 2000 (age 26) Henan, China

Gymnastics career
- Discipline: Women's artistic gymnastics
- Country represented: China (2014–present (CHN))
- Club: Henan Province
- Head coaches: Lu Lifeng; Zhang Haiyan; Qiao Liang
Medal record
Representing China
Asian Championships
| Gold medal – first place | 2019 Ulaanbaatar | Team |
| Gold medal – first place | 2019 Ulaanbaatar | Uneven bars |
| Silver medal – second place | 2019 Ulaanbaatar | All-around |
National Games
| Silver medal – second place | 2021 Shaanxi | Uneven Bars |

Lu Yufei (simplified Chinese: 芦玉菲; traditional Chinese: 蘆玉菲; pinyin: Lú Yùfēi; born 28 March 2000) is a Chinese artistic gymnast. She is the 2021 Chinese national all-around and floor exercise champion and balance beam silver medalist, and the 2020 Chinese national floor bronze medalist. She is the 2019 Asian Championships uneven bars champion and all-around silver medalist and a member of the gold medal-winning team. She represented China at the 2020 Summer Olympics and finished fourth in the uneven bars final.

== Career ==
=== Junior ===
Lu finished fortieth in the all-around qualification round at the 2013 Chinese Championships and did not advance to finals. She did not compete in the 2014 season due to injury. At the 2015 Chinese Championships, Lu finished sixth with the Henan team, tenth in the all-around, and sixth on uneven bars. She then competed at the 2015 China National Youth Games in October, winning the floor title and medals on all events but vault, where she was fourth. Lu was the second-most decorated gymnast of the event behind Liu Tingting.

=== Senior ===
==== 2016-2017 ====
Lu made her senior debut at the 2016 Chinese Championships and finished fourth on floor, missing the podium by two tenths. She considered retiring in 2016 but decided to continue competing. She finished seventh with the Henan team and fifth in the all-around at the 2017 Chinese Championships. Their team result qualified Henan for the 2017 National Games of China, where Henan was again seventh. Individually, Lu was seventh in the all-around, sixth on the balance beam, and fifth on the floor. She finished her 2017 season at the Chinese Individual Championships, where she competed on all events except balance beam in qualifications but did not advance to event finals.

==== 2018-2019 ====
At the 2018 Chinese Championships, Lu finished fourth with the Henan team and in the all-around, and seventh on the uneven bars. She had a stronger showing at the Chinese Individual Championships in September, winning bronzes in the all-around and on the floor, as well as placing fifth on uneven bars.

Lu made her international debut at the 2019 American Cup and finished sixth overall. At the 2019 Chinese Championships in May, she finished eighth with the Henan team, fourteenth in the all-around, and sixth on uneven bars. She was named to the Chinese team for the 2019 Asian Championships in June, alongside Liu Jieyu, Yu Linmin, Zhao Shiting, and Zhou Ruiyu. At Asian Championships, Lu won gold with the Chinese team, as well as gold on uneven bars and silver in the all-around behind Zhou. She also placed sixth on the balance beam.

==== 2020 ====
After the COVID-19 pandemic limited international competitions, Lu opened her season at the postponed Chinese Championships in September. During qualifications, the Henan team finished ninth, but Lu individually surprised to finish fourth in the all-around and earn berths in the uneven bars and floor finals. She remained in fourth overall after the all-around final, finishing only 0.150 points behind bronze medalist Qi Qi. Lu fell on a straddled Tkatchev release early in her routine during the uneven bars final and finish seventh. She went on to win the bronze medal in the floor final.

Lu finished her season at the Friendship and Solidarity Competition, which was held under strict COVID-19 safety protocols in Tokyo in November. She competed on uneven bars and balance beam to help Team Solidarity win gold.

==== 2021 ====
Lu competed at the Chinese Championships in early May. During qualifications, she and the Henan team were ninth overall. Individually, Lu finished second in the all-around behind Li Shijia, and qualified into all the event finals except for vault. She posted the highest score during the all-around final and her combined score earned her the gold medal ahead of Zhang Jin and Li; it was her first national title. Lu dedicated her medal to her coaches and also thanked her national teammates and staff for their continued support. On her win she stated, "It's my first all-around gold at the National Gymnastics Championships. I see it as proof that I have the capability of a champion, and I'm one step closer to the Tokyo Olympic Games." On the first day of event finals, Lu was unable to continue her streak of clean routines. After falling during her pirouette sequence, she finished last in the uneven bars final after having the second-highest score in qualifications. Lu rebounded on the second day of the event finals, winning silver on the balance beam behind Li Shijia and gold on the floor exercise. With her two golds and one silver, she was the most successful athlete of the event. Looking forward to the Olympic selection process, Lu said that because she missed the last Olympics due to injury, she wanted to "seize the chance this time around."

In June, Lu won the bronze medal in the all-around at the 1st Chinese Olympic Trials behind Zhang Jin and Tang Xijing. She also won the all-around bronze medal at the 2nd Chinese Olympic Trials behind Zhang and Wei Xiaoyuan. On 3 July, Lu was selected to represent China at the 2020 Summer Olympics alongside Ou Yushan, Tang Xijing, and Zhang Jin.

During the qualification round, Lu competed on all four events to help the Chinese team qualify in third place. Her all-around total of 55.066 qualified her for the all-around final in fourteenth place. She also qualified for the uneven bars event final in seventh with a score of 14.700. In the team final, Lu fell on the uneven bars and the Chinese team finished seventh. She then finished eighteenth in the all-around final with a score of 52.799. Then in the uneven bars final, she finished fourth with a score of 14.400, 0.100 away from the bronze medal.

After the Olympics, Lu competed at the National Games and the Henan team finished eighth. Individually, she finished fourth in the all-around and seventh on the balance beam and won the silver medal on the uneven bars behind Fan Yilin.

== Competitive history ==
| Year | Event | Team | AA | VT | UB | BB | FX |
Junior
| 2013 | National Championships | | 40 | | | | |
| 2014 | Did not compete | | | | | | |
| 2015 | National Championships | 6 | 10 | | 6 | | |
| 2015 | China National Youth Games | | 3rd place, bronze medalist(s) | 4 | 2nd place, silver medalist(s) | 3rd place, bronze medalist(s) | 1st place, gold medalist(s) |
Senior
| 2016 | National Championships | | | | | | 4 |
| 2017 | National Championships | 9 | 5 | | | | |
| 2017 | National Games | 7 | 7 | | | 6 | 5 |
| 2017 | National Individual Championships | Did not reach finals | | | | | |
| 2018 | National Championships | 4 | 4 | | 7 | | |
| 2018 | National Individual Championships | | 3rd place, bronze medalist(s) | | 5 | | 3rd place, bronze medalist(s) |
| 2019 | American Cup | | 6 | | | | |
| 2019 | National Championships | 8 | 14 | | 6 | | |
| 2019 | Asian Championships | 1st place, gold medalist(s) | 2nd place, silver medalist(s) | | 1st place, gold medalist(s) | 6 | |
| 2020 | National Championships | 9 | 4 | | 7 | | 3rd place, bronze medalist(s) |
| 2020 | Friendship and Solidarity Competition | 1st place, gold medalist(s) | | | | | |
| 2021 | National Championships | 9 | 1st place, gold medalist(s) | | 8 | 2nd place, silver medalist(s) | 1st place, gold medalist(s) |
| 2021 | Olympic Games | 7 | 18 | | 4 | | |
| 2021 | National Games | 8 | 4 | | 2nd place, silver medalist(s) | 7 | |
