= Li Shijia =

Chinese artistic gymnast

Li Shijia 李诗佳
- Full name: Li Shijia
- Born: October 7, 2003 (age 22) Sichuan, China

Gymnastics career
- Discipline: Women's artistic gymnastics
- Country represented: China (2017–2021)
- Head coaches: Wang Qunce, Xu Jinglei
Medal record
Representing China
World Championships
Bronze medal – third place	2019 Stuttgart	Balance Beam

Li Shijia (Chinese: 李诗佳; pinyin: Lǐ Shījiā; born October 7, 2003) is a Chinese artistic gymnast. She is the 2019 World bronze medalist on balance beam and the 2019 Zhaoqing World Cup champion on uneven bars and balance beam.

== Career ==
=== Junior ===
==== 2018 ====
Li competed at the 2018 WOGA Classic in Frisco, Texas, placing eleventh in the all-around and winning silver on balance beam behind Japan's Ayumi Niiyama. She finished fifth with the Chinese team at the 2018 City of Jesolo Trophy. At the 2018 Chinese National Championships, Li finished seventh with the Sichuan team. She also placed thirteenth in the all-around and fifth on balance beam.

=== Senior ===
==== 2019 ====
Li placed fifth with the Sichuan team and in the all-around at the 2019 Chinese National Championships, as well as eighth on uneven bars. At this competition, she debuted a new double-twisting Yurckenko vault. At the 2019 Zhaoqing World Cup she won gold on uneven bars ahead of Liu Jingxing and on balance beam ahead of Yin Sisi. Her score in the balance beam final of 15.050 was the second-highest international score of the year behind Simone Biles.

After upgrading her difficulty value on balance beam and floor exercise during the summer and placing second in the all-around at the final internal test, Li was named to the Chinese team for the 2019 World Artistic Gymnastics Championships in Stuttgart, Germany alongside Chen Yile, Liu Tingting, Qi Qi, Tang Xijing, and alternate Zhang Jin. She helped China qualify to the team final in second place behind the United States. Individually, Li recorded the seventh highest all-around score of all competitors, but qualified into the top group of six along with teammate Liu after American Grace McCallum's exclusion due to the two-per-country rule. She also qualified in second place into the balance beam final behind two-time world champion Simone Biles of the United States and ahead of the reigning world champion, Liu. During the team final, Li competed on vault and beam only. Her score of 14.266 on balance beam was the second highest of the day, behind only Biles. Overall, China finished fourth after counting three falls behind the United States, Russia, and Italy.

Li was the youngest competitor in the all-around final and finished ninth after a slight mishap on the uneven bars. In the balance beam final, she won the bronze medal behind Biles and Liu, hitting a clean routine with a few broken connections to score 14.300.

==== 2020 ====
Due to the COVID-19 pandemic, the 2020 Chinese National Championships were postponed from May to September. Li suffered a waist injury during training which limited her to competing on uneven bars. In the qualification round, which also served as a team final, Li placed tenth with the Sichuan team and ninth individually on the uneven bars, narrowly missing out on the event final by half a tenth of a point.

==== 2021 ====
At the 2021 Chinese Artistic Gymnastics Championships she won gold at the balance beam and bronze at the all-around competition. As the top 8 all-around gymnasts would be included in the training squad for the 2020 Summer Olympics this secured her a place in the team but a knee injury kept her from participating.

== Competitive history ==
Competitive history of Li Shijia
Year	Event	Team	AA	VT	UB	BB	FX
2018	WOGA Classic (junior)		11			2nd place, silver medalist(s)	
2018	City of Jesolo Trophy (junior)	5					
2018	National Championships (junior)	7	13			5	
2019	National Championships	5	5		8		
2019	Zhaoqing World Cup				1st place, gold medalist(s)	1st place, gold medalist(s)	
2019	World Championships	4	9			3rd place, bronze medalist(s)	
2020	National Championships	10					
2021	National Championships	4	3rd place, bronze medalist(s)		5	1st place, gold medalist(s)	5
