= Tang Xijing =

Chinese artistic gymnast

Tang Xijing 唐茜靖
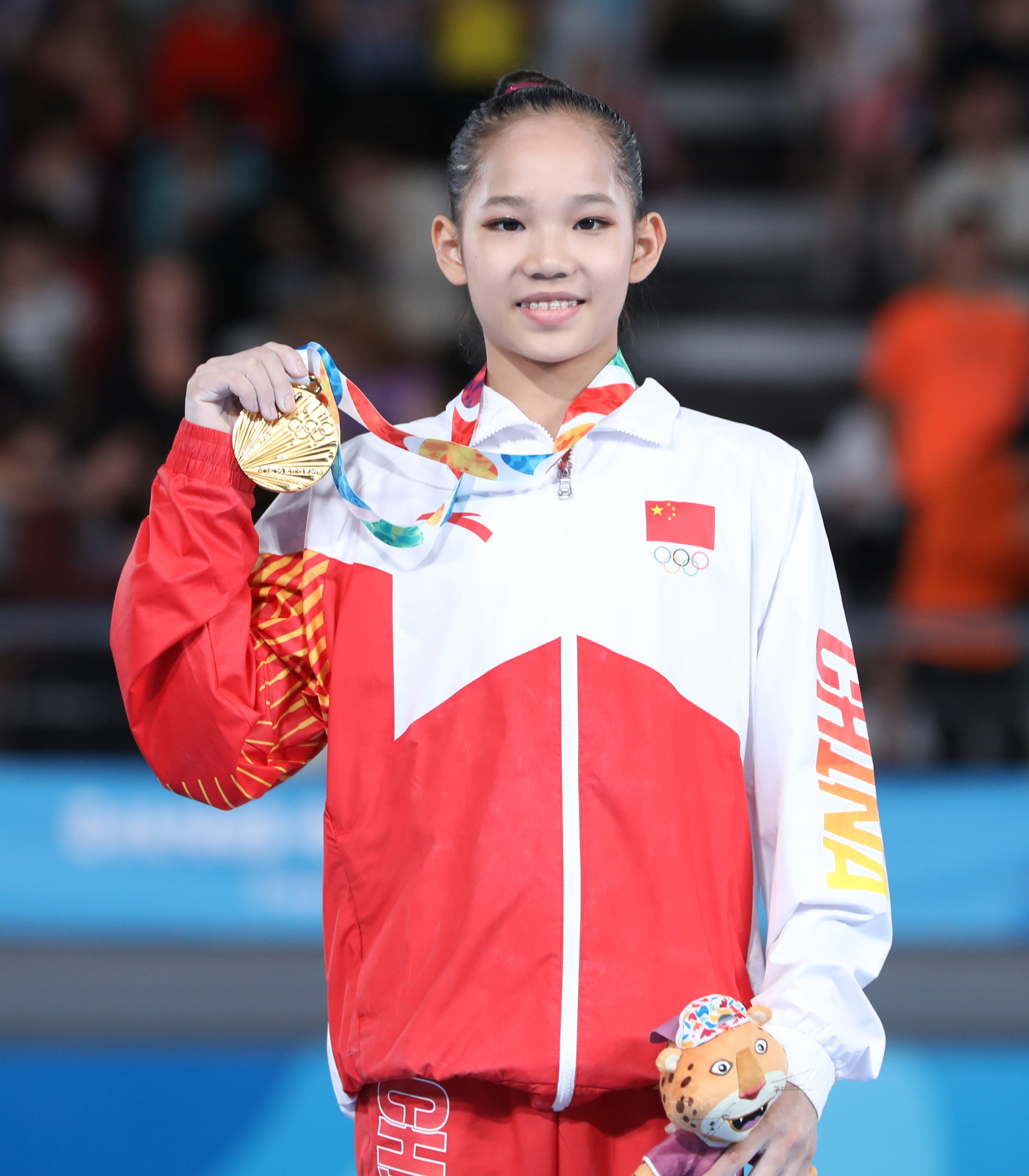
- Tang at the 2018 Youth Olympic Games

Personal information
- Full name: Tang Xijing
- Nicknames: Xixi, Silver Princess
- Born: January 3, 2003 (age 23) Guangdong, China

Gymnastics career
- Discipline: Women's artistic gymnastics
- Country represented: China; (2016–present)
- Head coaches: Wang Liming, He Hua
Medal record
Representing China
Olympic Games
Silver medal – second place	2020 Tokyo	Balance beam
World Championships
Silver medal – second place	2019 Stuttgart	All-around
Asian Games
Gold medal – first place	2022 Hangzhou	Team
Silver medal – second place	2022 Hangzhou	Balance beam
Asian Championships
Gold medal – first place	2022 Doha	Team
Silver medal – second place	2022 Doha	All-around
Silver medal – second place	2022 Doha	Uneven bars
Youth Olympic Games
Gold medal – first place	2018 Buenos Aires	Balance beam
Bronze medal – third place	2018 Buenos Aires	Uneven bars
National Games
Silver medal – second place	2017 Tianjin	Team
Bronze medal – third place	2017 Tianjin	Balance beam
Bronze medal – third place	2021 Shaanxi	Team

Tang Xijing (Chinese: 唐茜靖; pinyin: Táng Xījìng; Jyutping: Tong4 Sai1-zing6; born January 3, 2003) is a Chinese artistic gymnast. She is the 2019 World all-around silver medalist, matching Jiang Yuyuan at the 2010 World Championships for the highest all-around finish for a Chinese woman in World or Olympic history. She is also the 2020 Olympic silver medalist on balance beam and the 2022 Chinese national all-around champion. At the junior level she is the 2018 Youth Olympic balance beam champion and uneven bars bronze medalist. She unofficially announced her retirement on March 20, 2024, on her alternate Weibo account.

== Junior gymnastics career ==
Tang won the gold medal as part of the Chinese team with He Licheng, Qi Qi, Yin Sisi, and Zhao Shiting at the 2018 Asian Junior Championships in Jakarta, Indonesia. Individually, she won the gold in balance beam ahead of Yin and Eum Doh-yun of South Korea. Tang won the bronze medal in the all-around at the 2018 Chinese National Championships behind Luo Huan and Zhang Jin. She won silver with the Beijing team and placed fourth in the uneven bars final.

Tang competed at the 2018 Youth Olympic Games in Buenos Aires, Argentina where she qualified third into the all-around final and all event finals except vault. She placed fourth in the all-around after falling twice on the beam. In the event finals, Tang won gold in balance beam ahead of Russia's Ksenia Klimenko and Great Britain's Amelie Morgan, and bronze in uneven bars behind Klimenko and Giorgia Villa of Italy. She also placed fourth in floor.

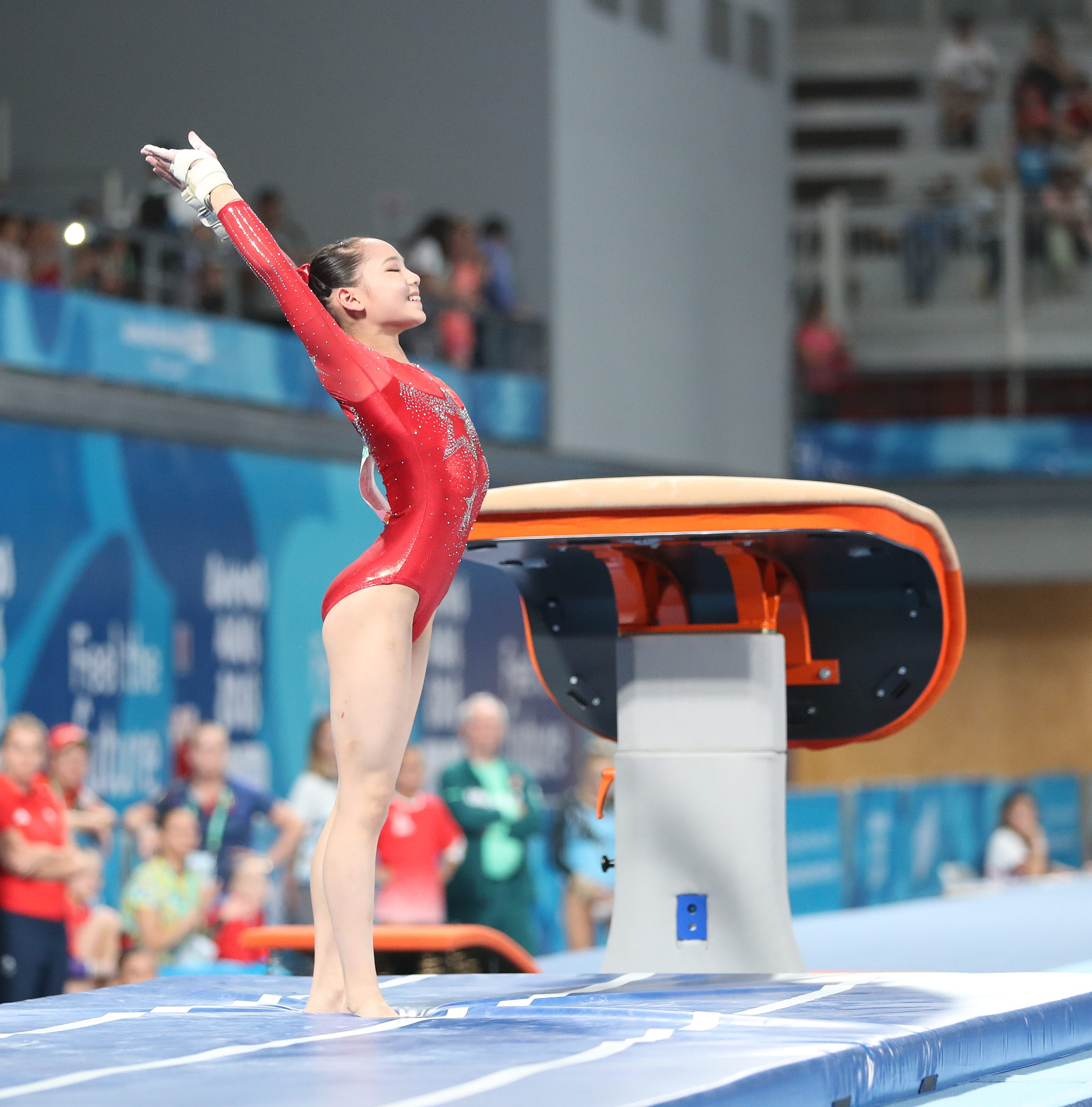
Vault Qualification

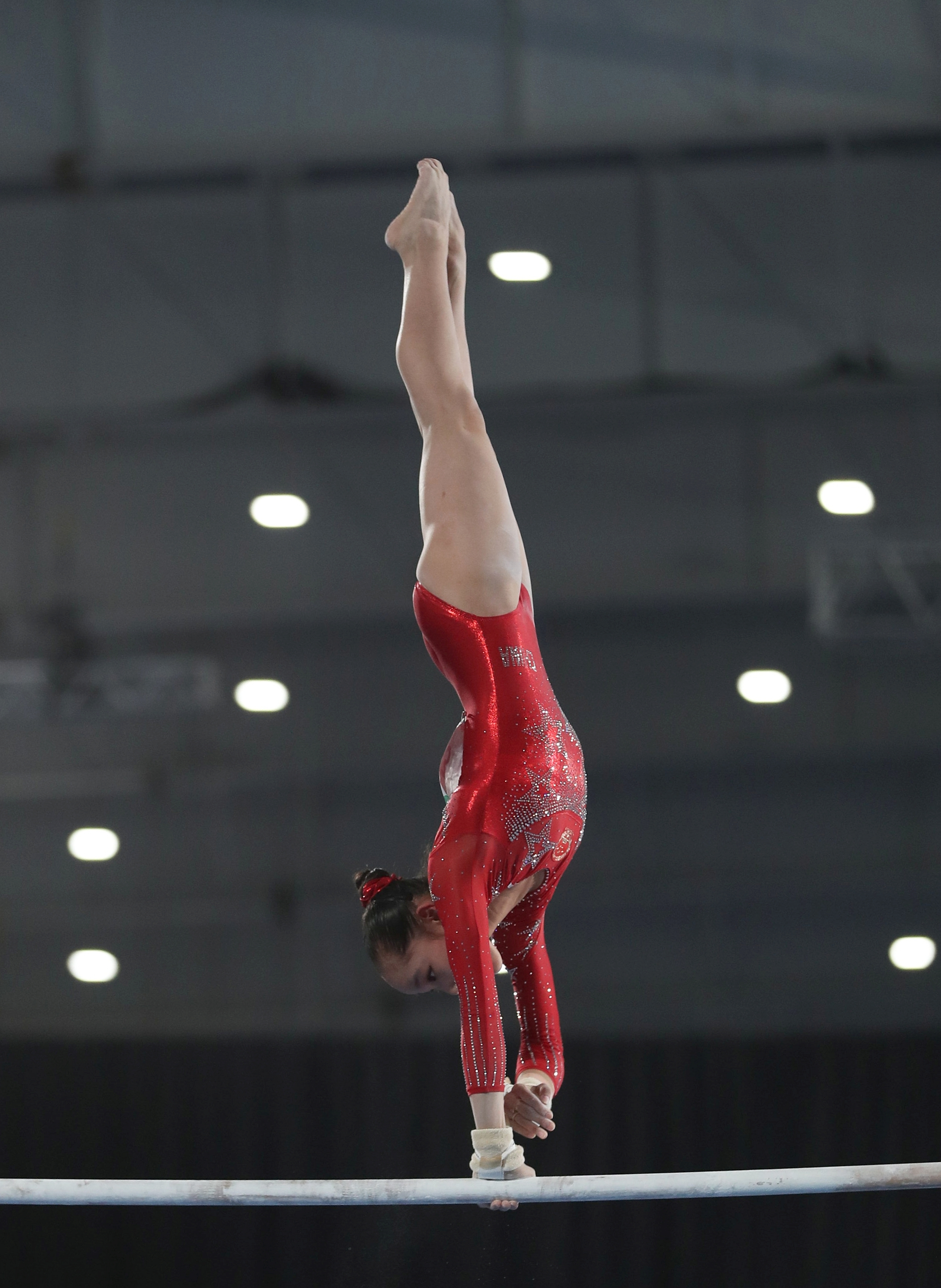
Uneven bars final

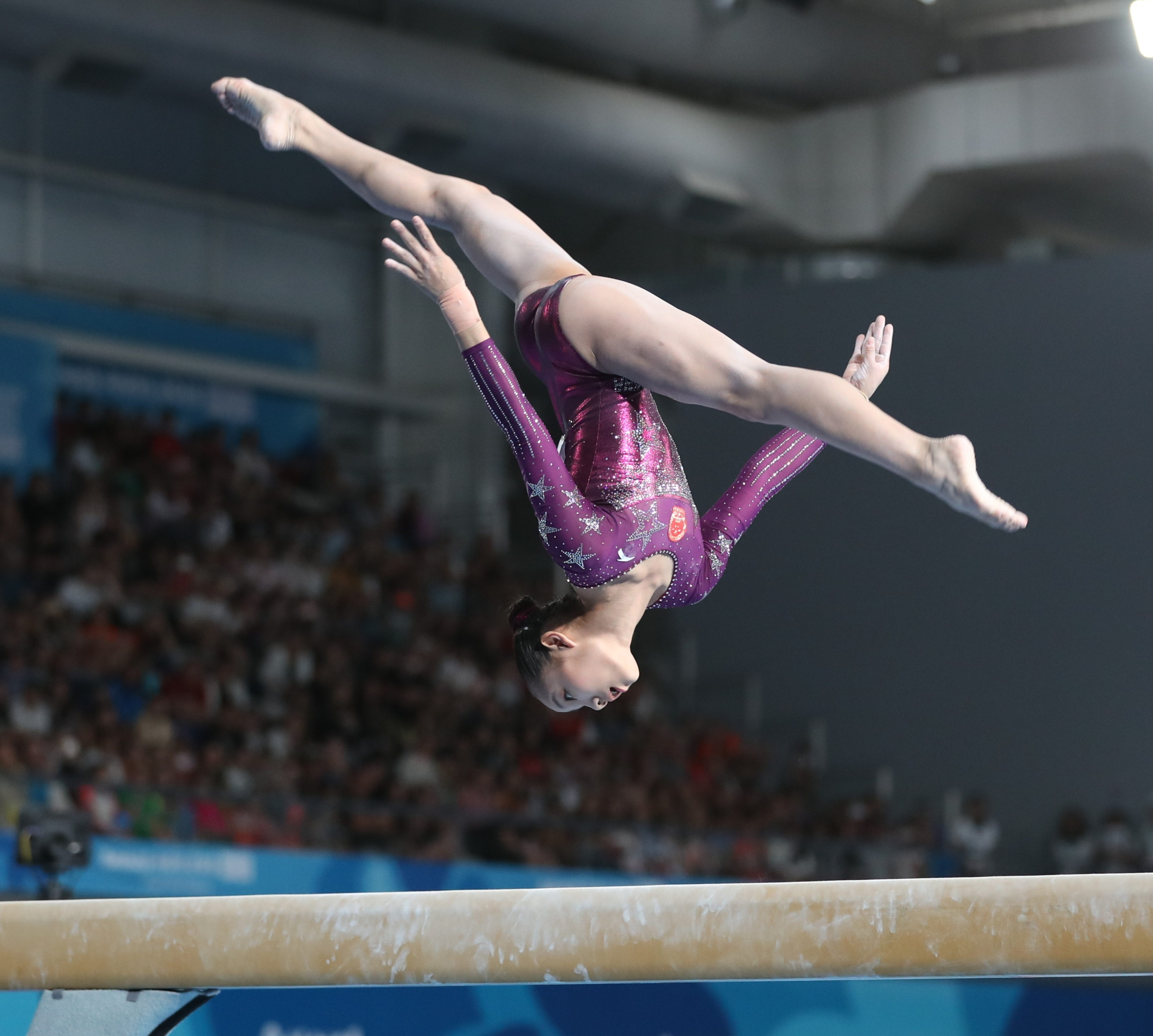
Balance beam final

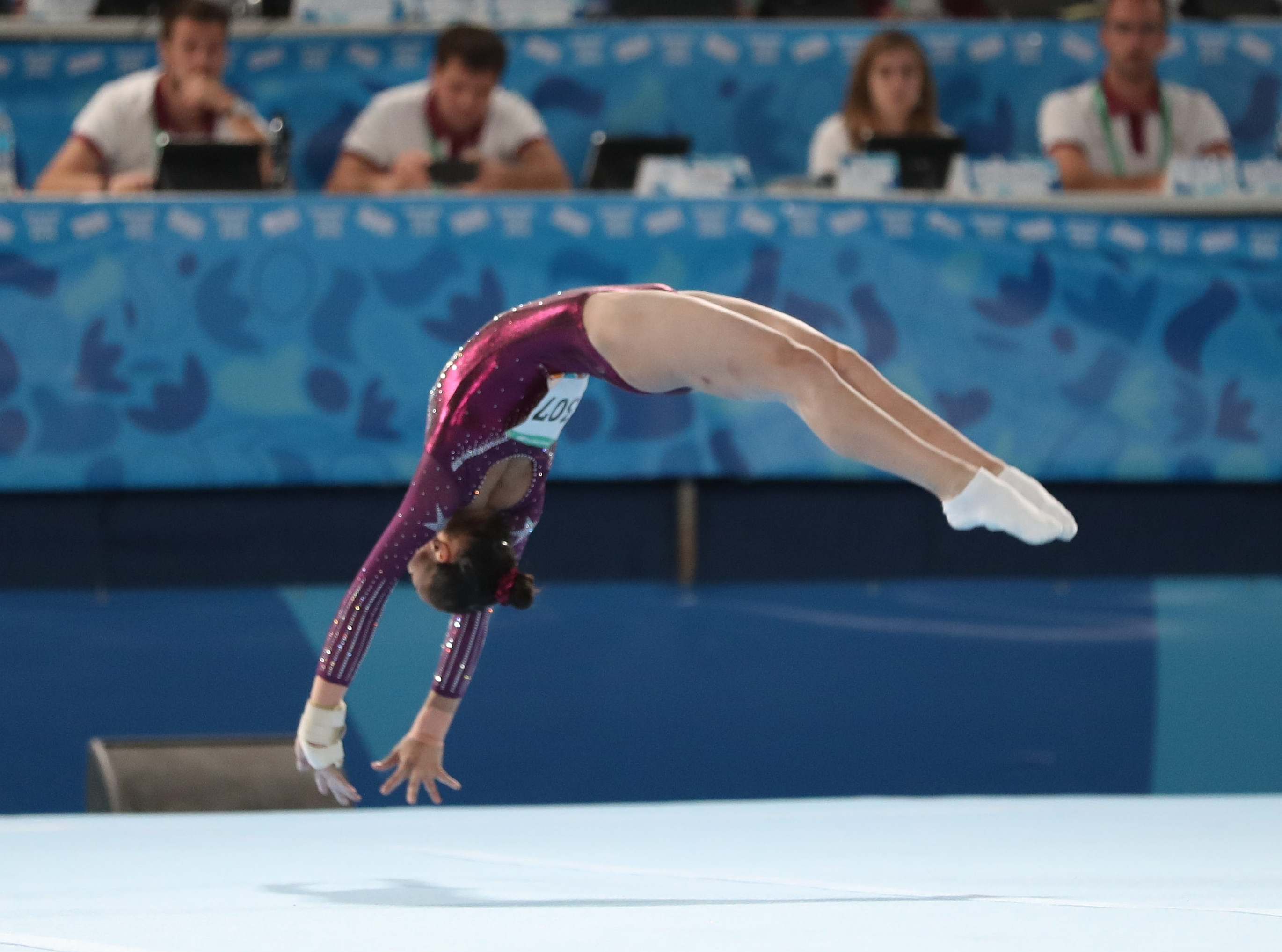
Floor exercise final

Tang at the 2018 Youth Olympics

== Senior gymnastics career ==
=== 2019 ===
Tang was named to the Chinese team for the 2019 City of Jesolo Trophy with Liu Tingting, Qi Qi, and Zhang Jin, where they won the silver medal behind the United States. She individually placed fourth in the all-around and won silver on the uneven bars. At the 2019 Chinese National Championships, she won silver with the Beijing team and on balance beam behind junior Ou Yushan, as well as fourth in the all-around.

Tang was named to the Chinese team for the 2019 World Championships in Stuttgart, Germany, alongside Chen Yile, Li Shijia, Liu Tingting, Qi Qi, and Zhang Jin. She helped the team qualify in second behind the United States and was the first reserve in uneven bars. Tang failed to qualify to the all-around final due to the two-per-country rule. She competed in vault, where she debuted a new double-twisting Yurchenko vault, uneven bars, and floor during the team final to help China place fourth behind the United States, Russia, and Italy after the team counted three falls.

Tang replaced Liu in the all-around final after Liu's withdrawal. Despite qualifying in 21st place to the all-around, since she was replacing sixth-place qualifier Liu, she was seeded in the top rotating group. Tang hit four strong routines to win a surprise silver medal in the all-around behind five-time world champion Simone Biles of the United States and ahead of 2019 European Games Champion Angelina Melnikova of Russia. She recorded the second-highest beam score of the day behind Biles. This finish marks the highest placement of a female Chinese gymnast in World Championships or Olympic history, matching Jiang Yuyuan's second-place finish at the 2010 World Championships. It was also the first all-around medal won by a Chinese woman at the World or Olympic level since Yao Jinnan's bronze medal at the 2011 World Championships.

=== 2020 ===
After the postponement of the 2020 Summer Olympics due to the COVID-19 pandemic, Tang competed at the delayed Chinese National Championships in September. As the reigning World all-around silver medalist, Tang was a favorite for the title. In the qualification round, which also served as the team final, Tang and Qi Qi led the Beijing provincial team to a fourth consecutive silver medal. Individually, a major error on the uneven bars and a fall on the balance beam caused Tang to miss qualifying for both of those event finals and to enter the all-around final in sixth place. However, a strong performance in floor featuring a new full-twisting double tuck allowed her to qualify to that final in third place behind Qi and reigning national champion Shang Chunsong. After qualifications, Tang said she felt physically stronger and that she hoped to overcome her pattern of making errors in the first round of a competition.

In the all-around final, Tang improved on her qualifications performance to place fifth in the two-day combined all-around standings. Tang recorded the top beam score of the day by a wide margin after landing her new double pike dismount and earned the fourth-highest score in both vault and floor exercise. Another major error on the uneven bars prevented her from making the all-around podium, with her training mates Wei Xiaoyuan and Qi Qi ultimately taking silver and bronze. In the floor exercise final, Tang also placed fifth with a clean routine, less than a tenth from the podium.

=== 2021 ===
On 3 July, Tang was selected to represent China at the 2020 Summer Olympics alongside Lu Yufei, Ou Yushan, and Zhang Jin; they finished seventh as a team. On 3 August she competed in the balance beam event final and won the silver medal behind compatriot Guan Chenchen.

=== 2022 ===
Tang competed at the 2022 Asian Championships in June. While there she helped China place first as a team. Individually, she won silver in the all-around behind Zhang Jin and in uneven bars behind Wei Xiaoyuan. At the Chinese National Championships Tang placed first in the all-around. Additionally, she placed third in uneven bars behind Luo Rui and Wei Xiaoyuan, and eighth in floor exercise.

== Selected competitive skills ==
Apparatus	Name	Description	Difficulty	Performed
Vault	Baitova	Yurchenko entry, laid out salto backwards with two twists	5.4	2019–20
Uneven bars	Healy	Forward giant with 360° turn on one arm from reverse grip to L grip	E	2019–21
Uneven bars	Ling	Forward giant with 360° turn on one arm from L grip to L grip	E	2019–21
Uneven bars	Piked Jaeger	Reverse grip swing to piked salto forwards to catch high bar	E	2019–21
Uneven bars	Van Leeuwen	Toe-on Shaposhnikova transition with 1/2 twist to high bar	E	2019–21
Balance beam	Layout step-out	Mount: round-off at end of beam, salto stretched with step out	E	2019–21
Balance beam	Layout	Salto backwards stretched with legs together	E	2019–21
Balance beam	Switch ring	Switch leap to ring position (180° split with raised back leg)	E	2019–20
Balance beam	Double pike	Dismount: Double piked salto backwards	E	2020–21
Balance beam	Triple twist	Dismount: laid out salto backwards with triple (3/1) twist	F	2019
Floor exercise	Mukhina	Double tucked salto backwards with full (1/1) twist	E	2020–21
Floor exercise	Triple twist	Laid out salto backwards with triple (3/1) twist	E	2019–21

== Competitive history ==
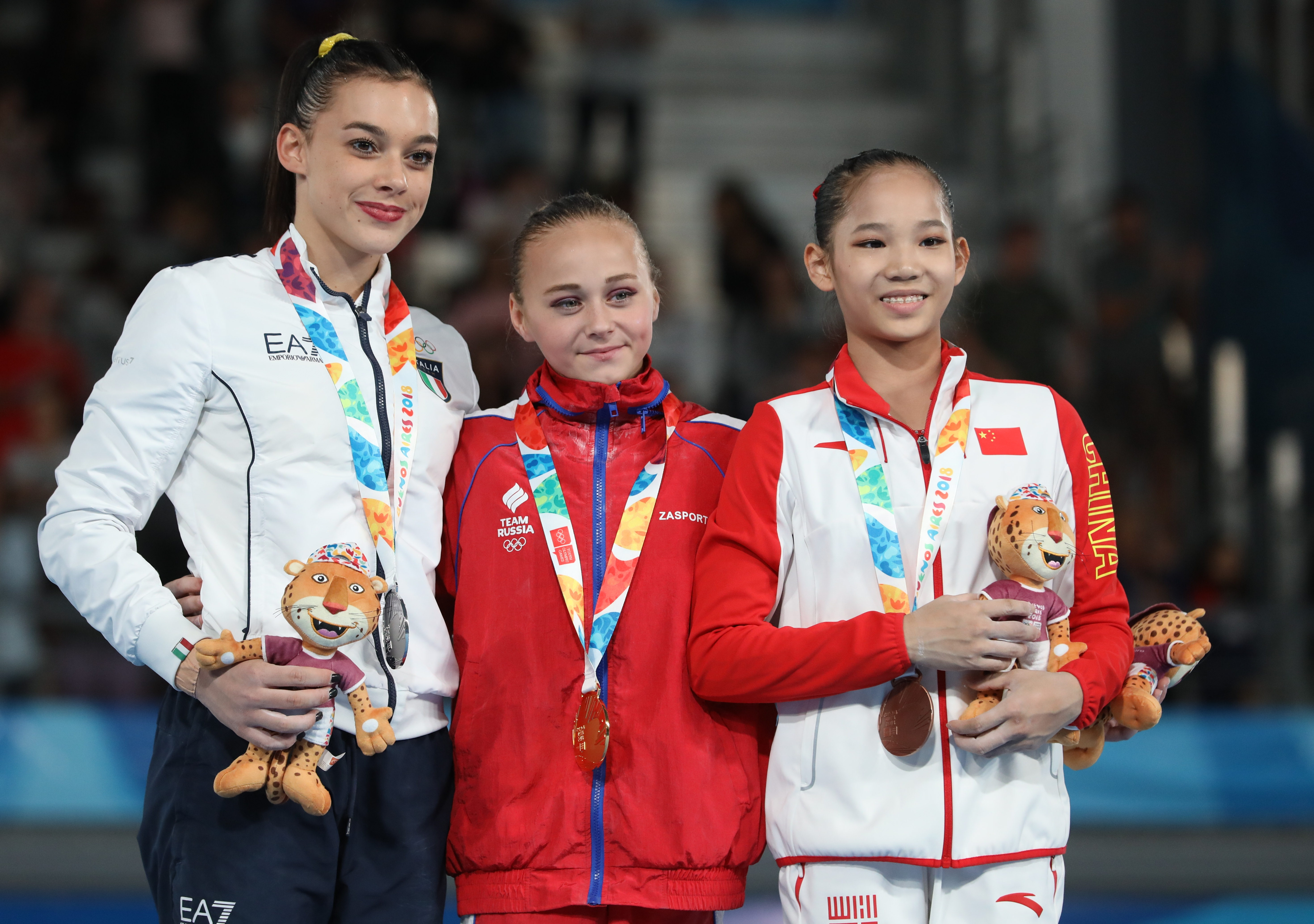
Tang (right) on the uneven bars podium at the 2018 Youth Olympic Games

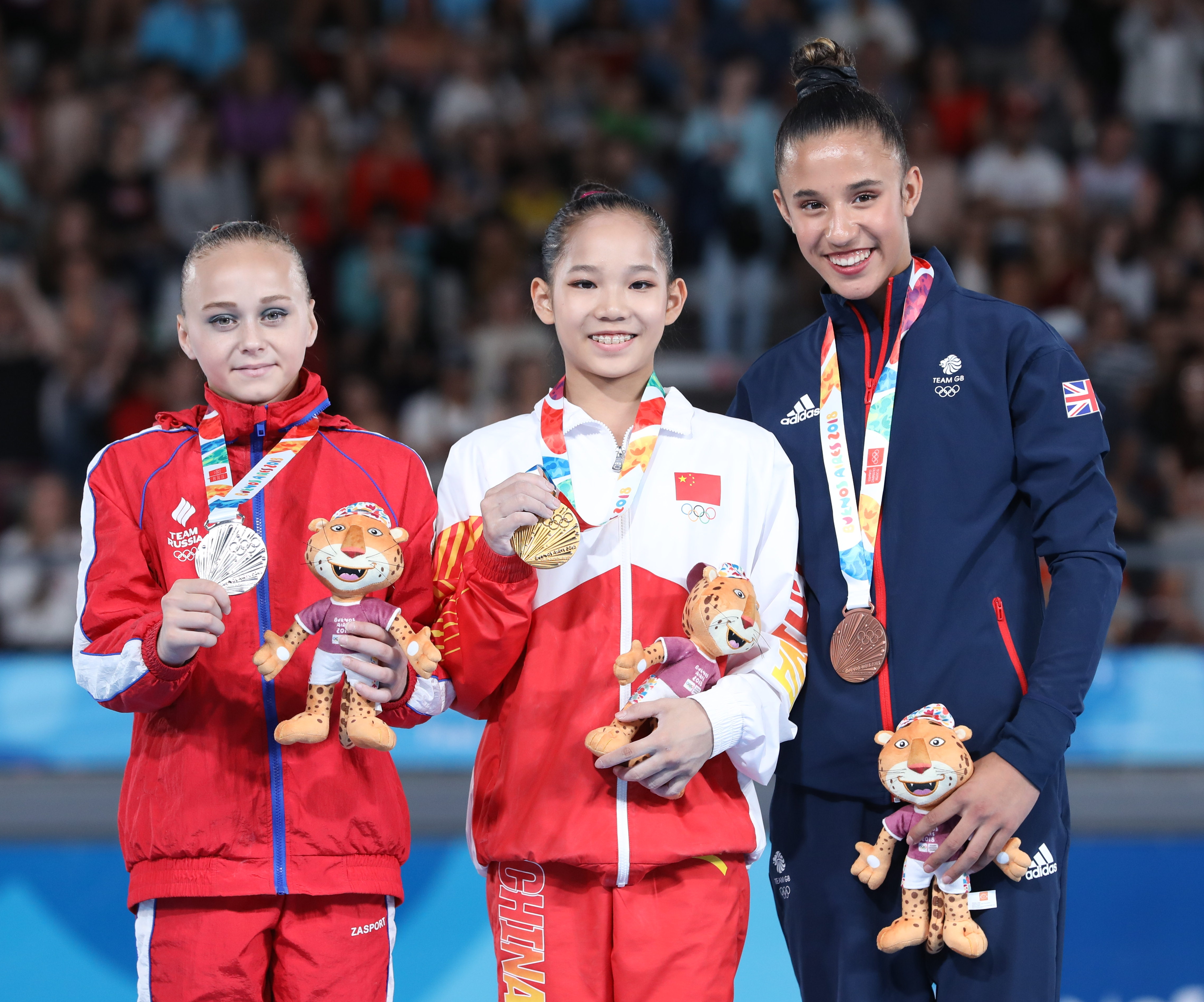
Tang (center) on the balance beam podium at the 2018 Youth Olympic Games

Competitive history of Tang Xijing at the junior level
Year	Event	Team	AA	VT	UB	BB	FX
2016	Junior National Championships		2nd place, silver medalist(s)	2nd place, silver medalist(s)	2nd place, silver medalist(s)		2nd place, silver medalist(s)
2017	National Championships	2nd place, silver medalist(s)	4				8
2017	National Games	2nd place, silver medalist(s)				3rd place, bronze medalist(s)	
2018
2018	Asian Junior Championships	1st place, gold medalist(s)				1st place, gold medalist(s)	
2018	National Championships	2nd place, silver medalist(s)	3rd place, bronze medalist(s)		4		
2018	Individual National Championships		1st place, gold medalist(s)		4	5	1st place, gold medalist(s)
2018	Youth Olympic Games		4		3rd place, bronze medalist(s)	1st place, gold medalist(s)	4

Competitive history of Tang Xijing at the senior level
Year	Event	Team	AA	VT	UB	BB	FX
2019	City of Jesolo Trophy	2nd place, silver medalist(s)	4		2nd place, silver medalist(s)		
2019	National Championships	2nd place, silver medalist(s)	4			2nd place, silver medalist(s)	
2019	World Championships	4	2nd place, silver medalist(s)				
2020	National Championships	2nd place, silver medalist(s)	5				5
2020	Individual National Championships		1st place, gold medalist(s)		2nd place, silver medalist(s)	6	2nd place, silver medalist(s)
2021	National Championships	2nd place, silver medalist(s)	4		5	3rd place, bronze medalist(s)	
2021	Olympic Games	7	7			2nd place, silver medalist(s)	
2021	National Games	3rd place, bronze medalist(s)	13		6		
2022
2022	Asian Championships	1st place, gold medalist(s)	2nd place, silver medalist(s)		2nd place, silver medalist(s)		
2022	National Championships	12	1st place, gold medalist(s)		3rd place, bronze medalist(s)		8
2022	World Championships	6	WD				
2023	National Championships	4					
2023	Asian Games	1st place, gold medalist(s)			5	2nd place, silver medalist(s)	
