= He Licheng =

Chinese artistic gymnast

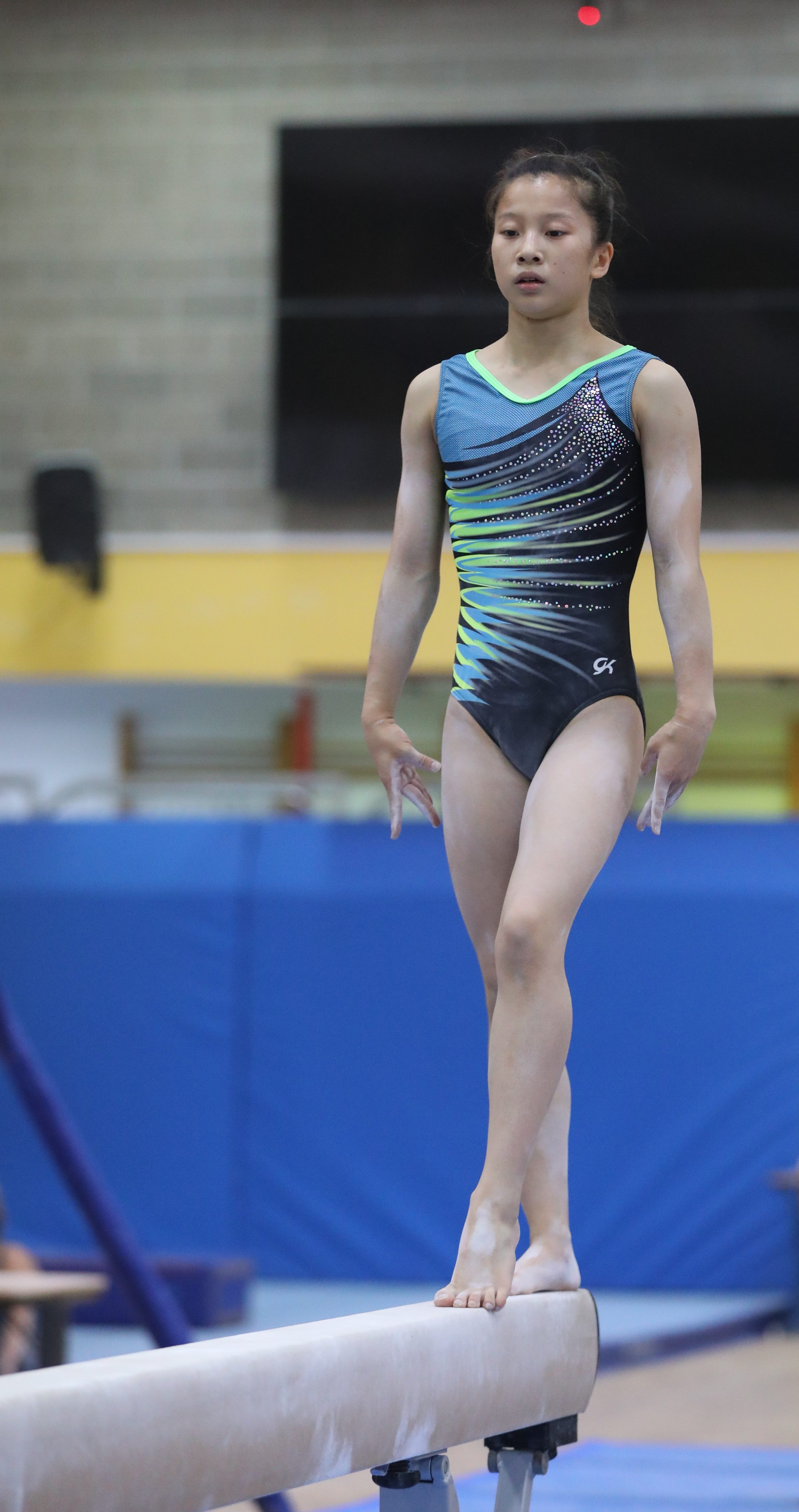
He Licheng in 2019

He Licheng is a Chinese individual artistic gymnast.

At the 2018 Junior Asian Championships in Jakarta, Indonesia, she won the gold medal as part of the Chinese team with Qi Qi, Tang Xijing, Yin Sisi, and Zhao Shiting .

In May 2021, following that year's Chinese nationals where she placed fifth in the all-around, she was named to the provisional Chinese Olympic squad.
