= 2012 Northern European Gymnastics Championships =

International gymnastics competition

- Venue: Emirates Arena
- Location: Glasgow, Scotland
- Start date: 20 October 2012
- End date: 21 October 2012

The 2012 Northern European Gymnastics Championships was an artistic gymnastics competition held in the city of Glasgow in Scotland, United Kingdom. The event was held between 20 and 21 October at the Emirates Arena.

== Medalists ==
Event	Gold	Silver	Bronze
Men
Team all-around	Finland; Kasper Holopainen; Tomi Tuuha; Heikki Niva; Markku Vahtila; Jouko Koskinen	Norway; Lars Fjeld; Marcus Conradi; Lars Planke; Joachim Hanche-Olsen; Hakon Andreasson	Denmark; Helge Vammen; Joao Fuglsig; Marcus Frandsen; Mikkel Jensen; Kasper Rydberg
Individual all-around	Helge Vammen (DEN)	Clinton Purnell (WAL)	Kasper Holopainen (FIN)
Floor	Tomi Tuuha (FIN)	Kasper Holopainen (FIN)	Lars Fjeld (NOR)
Pommel horse	Helge Vammen (DEN)	Olafur Gunnarsson (ISL)	Markku Vahtila (FIN)
Rings	Markku Vahtila (FIN)	Clinton Purnell (WAL)	Tomi Tuuha (FIN)
Vault	Clinton Purnell (WAL)	Tomi Tuuha (FIN)	Carl Green (SWE)
Parallel bars	Heikki Niva (FIN)	Hakon Andreasson (NOR)	Joachim Hanche-Olsen (NOR)
Horizontal bar	Joachim Hanche-Olsen (NOR)	Liam Davie (SCO)	Oskar Kirmes (SWE)
Women
Team all-around	Wales; Keira Brennan; Jessica Hogg; Angel Romaeo; Georgina Hockenhull	Sweden; Emma Larsson; Ece Ayan; Lovisa Estberg; Ida Gustafsson	Scotland; Amy Regan; Jordan Archibald; Cara Kennedy
Individual all-around	Ida Gustafsson (SWE)	Angel Romaeo (WAL)	Emma Larsson (SWE)
Vault	Emma Larsson (SWE)	Amy Regan (SCO)	Keira Brennan (WAL)
Uneven bars	Emma Larsson (SWE)	Angel Romaeo (WAL)	Ida Gustafsson (SWE)
Balance beam	Jessica Hogg (WAL)	Tinna Odinsdottir (ISL) Georgina Hockenhull (WAL)	None Awarded
Floor	Jessica Hogg (WAL)	Angel Romaeo (WAL)	Lovisa Estberg (SWE)
