= Gymnastics at the 2014 Commonwealth Games – Women's artistic team all-around =

Women's artistic team all-around at the 2014 Commonwealth Games
- Venue: Scottish Exhibition and Conference Centre
- Dates: 28–29 July 2014
- Competitors: 63 from 17 nations

Medalists
gold medal	Ruby Harrold; Kelly Simm; Hannah Whelan; Claudia Fragapane; Becky Downie	England
silver medal	Georgia Rose Brown; Larrissa Miller; Lauren Mitchell; Mary Anne Monckton; Olivia Vivian	Australia
bronze medal	Elizabeth Beddoe; Georgina Hockenhull; Jessica Hogg; Angel Romaeo; Raer Theaker	Wales

The Women's artistic team all-around gymnastics competition at the 2014 Commonwealth Games in Glasgow, Scotland was held on 28 and 29 July at the Scottish Exhibition and Conference Centre.

The team competition also served as qualification for the individual all-around and event finals.

== Team competition ==
Rank	Country	Vault (gymnastics)	Uneven bars	Balance beam	Floor (gymnastics)	Total
1st place, gold medalist(s)	England	43.974	41.416	40.266	41.899	167.555
1st place, gold medalist(s)	Claudia Fragapane	14.641	13.333	14.033	14.733	167.555
1st place, gold medalist(s)	Becky Downie		14.683	13.200		167.555
1st place, gold medalist(s)	Ruby Harrold	14.733	13.400	12.466	13.466	167.555
1st place, gold medalist(s)	Kelly Simm	14.600			12.466	167.555
1st place, gold medalist(s)	Hannah Whelan	14.300	12.333	13.033	13.700	167.555
2nd place, silver medalist(s)	Australia	41.566	42.316	38.332	39.432	161.646
2nd place, silver medalist(s)	Georgia Rose Brown	14.133	14.083	11.200	11.066	161.646
2nd place, silver medalist(s)	Larrissa Miller		14.433		12.166	161.646
2nd place, silver medalist(s)	Lauren Mitchell	13.433		13.966	14.100	161.646
2nd place, silver medalist(s)	Mary Anne Monckton	14.000	13.333	13.100		161.646
2nd place, silver medalist(s)	Olivia Vivian	12.533	13.800	11.266	13.166	161.646
3rd place, bronze medalist(s)	Wales	41.532	39.866	39.565	39.132	160.095
3rd place, bronze medalist(s)	Elizabeth Beddoe	13.900	13.533	13.166	13.166	160.095
3rd place, bronze medalist(s)	Georgina Hockenhull	13.666	12.666	13.333	12.366	160.095
3rd place, bronze medalist(s)	Jessica Hogg	13.766		12.366	13.266	160.095
3rd place, bronze medalist(s)	Angel Romaeo		13.033	13.066	12.700	160.095
3rd place, bronze medalist(s)	Raer Theaker	13.866	13.300			160.095
4	Canada	42.299	37.433	39.432	40.399	159.563
4	Ellie Black	14.233	13.333	13.966	13.633	159.563
4	Maegan Chant	14.000	12.700	12.333	13.133	159.563
4	Stefanie Merkle	14.066		11.966	13.633	159.563
4	Isabela Maria Onyshko	13.900	11.400	13.133	12.966	159.563
4	Victoria Kayen Woo		10.800			159.563
5	Scotland	41.299	36.198	35.966	38.132	151.595
5	Cara Kennedy	13.133		11.500	12.533	151.595
5	Erin McLachlan	13.300	11.966	12.600		151.595
5	Amy Regan	13.966	11.766	11.866	12.833	151.595
5	Carly Smtih		11.000		11.566	151.595
5	Emma White	14.033	12.466	11.066	12.766	151.595
6	South Africa	41.566	37.199	35.233	37.365	151.363
6	Kirsten Beckett	14.300	12.966	12.733	13.266	151.363
6	Claudia Cummins	13.900	12.133	11.600	11.733	151.363
6	Bianca Mann	13.366	12.100	11.600	12.366	151.363
7	Singapore	39.774	34.733	37.166	36.899	148.572
7	Janessa Dai	13.208	11.533	11.400	12.766	148.572
7	Ashly Lau	13.066	11.800		11.300	148.572
7	Heem Wei Lim	13.500	11.400	12.866	12.600	148.572
7	Joey Tam			12.900		148.572
7	Michelle Teo	13.066	10.800		11.533	148.572
8	Malaysia	40.465	31.499	34.765	37.707	144.436
8	Farah Ann Abdul Hadi	13.933	11.700	12.166	12.833	144.436
8	Nur Eli Ellina Azmi	12.600	10.266	11.266	11.808	144.436
8	Yueh Tan Ing	13.466	9.166	11.333	11.300	144.436
8	Ang Tracie	13.066	9.533	10.316	13.066	144.436
9	Northern Ireland	38.399	32.366	33.999	35.565	140.329
9	Sarah Beck	12.700	11.466	11.233	10.966	140.329
9	Nicole Mawhinney	13.266	10.700	11.533	12.433	140.329
9	India McPeak	12.266	10.200	11.233		140.329
9	Ciara Roberts	12.433	9.333	9.008	12.166	140.329
10	Isle of Man	39.466	30.066	32.949	36.999	139.480
10	Nicole Burns	12.866	9.433	10.100	12.433	139.480
10	Tara Donnelly	13.300	10.000	11.483	11.733	139.480
10	Grace Harrison	13.300	9.633	11.366	12.833	139.480
10	Kaitlin Kneen	12.633	10.433	9.666	11.733	139.480
11	India	39.776	28.066	32.765	33.757	134.354
11	Aruna Budda Reddy	13.500		10.466	11.300	134.354
11	Pranati Das	12.666	8.000	8.966	10.233	134.354
11	Rucha Sachin Divekar		7.666			134.354
11	Dipa Karmakar	13.200	9.700	11.966	12.066	134.354
11	Pranati Nayak	13.066	10.366	10.333	10.391	134.354
12	New Zealand	41.323	35.365	24.466	26.424	127.487
12	Brittany Robertson	13.966	11.866	11.700	12.958	127.487
12	Mackenzie Slee	13.466				127.487
12	Charlotte Sullivan	13.800	11.766	12.766	13.466	127.487
12	Anna Tempero		11.733			127.487
13	Sri Lanka	37.799	19.733	25.699	26.899	110.130
13	Tilanka Abayagunawardana	12.733	6.433	8.033	8.733	110.130
13	Ridma Bengalage	12.443	6.600	8.733	9.766	110.130
13	Sachini Kawsalya Koswawaththa Liyanage	12.633	6.700	8.933	8.400	110.130
14	Malta	35.699	16.099	19.600	21.232	92.360
14	Kirsty Caruana	12.666	7.433	10.400	11.466	92.360
14	Peppijna Dalli	11.800	8.666			92.360
14	Adreana Jo Zammit	11.233		9.200	9.766	92.360

== Qualification results ==
=== Individual all-around ===
Position	Gymnast	Vault (gymnastics)	Uneven bars	Balance beam	Floor (gymnastics)	Total	Notes
1	Claudia Fragapane (ENG)	14.641	13.333	14.033	14.733	56.740	Q
2	Ellie Black (CAN)	14.233	13.333	13.966	13.633	55.165	Q
3	Ruby Harrold (ENG)	14.733	13.400	12.466	13.466	54.065	Q
4	Elizabeth Beddoe (WAL)	13.900	13.533	13.166	13.166	53.765	Q
5	Hannah Whelan (ENG)	14.300	12.333	13.033	13.700	53.366	Q
6	Kirsten Beckett (RSA)	14.300	12.966	12.733	13.266	53.265	Q
7	Maegan Chant (CAN)	14.000	12.700	12.333	13.133	52.166	Q
8	Georgina Hockenhull (WAL)	13.666	12.666	13.333	12.366	52.031	Q
9	Charlotte Sullivan (NZL)	13.800	11.766	12.766	13.466	51.798	Q
10	Isabela Onyshko (CAN)	13.900	11.400	13.133	12.966	51.399	Q
11	Olivia Vivian (AUS)	12.533	13.800	11.266	13.166	50.765	Q
12	Farah Ann Abdul Hadi (MAS)	13.933	11.700	12.166	12.833	50.632	Q
13	Brittany Robertson (NZL)	13.966	11.866	11.700	12.958	50.490	Q
14	Georgia-Rose Brown (AUS)	14.133	14.083	11.200	11.066	50.482	Q
15	Amy Regan (SCO)	13.966	11.766	11.866	12.833	50.431	Q
16	Heem Wei Lim (SIN)	13.500	11.400	12.866	12.600	50.366	Q
17	Emma White (SCO)	14.033	12.466	11.066	12.766	50.331	Q
18	Claudia Cummins (RSA)	13.900	12.133	11.600	11.733	49.366	Q
19	Janessa Dai (SIN)	13.208	11.533	11.400	12.766	48.907	Q
20	Bianca Mann (RSA)	13.366	12.100	10.900	12.366	48.732	Q
21	Nicole Mawhinney (NIR)	13.266	10.700	11.533	12.433	47.932	Q
22	Grace Harrison (IOM)	13.300	9.633	11.366	12.833	47.132	Q
23	Dipa Karmakar (IND)	13.200	9.700	11.966	12.066	46.932	Q
24	Stelutsa Savvidou (CYP)	12.800	10.458	11.333	12.000	46.591	Q
25	Tara Donnelly (IOM)	13.300	10.000	11.483	11.733	46.516	R1
26	Sarah Beck (NIR)	12.700	11.466	11.233	10.966	46.365	R2
27	Ang Tracie (MAS)	13.066	9.533	10.316	13.066	45.981	R3
28	Nur Eli Ellina Azmi (MAS)	12.600	10.266	11.266	11.808	45.940	
29	Yueh Tan Ing (MAS)	13,466	9.166	11.333	11.300	45.265	
30	Nicole Burns (IOM)	12.866	9.433	10.100	12.433	44.832	
31	Kaitlin Kneen (IOM)	12.633	10.433	9.666	11.733	44.465	
32	Pranati Nayak (IND)	13.066	10.366	10.333	10.391	44.156	
33	Charlotte Pollard (JER)	12.600	9.766	10.366	11.266	43.998	
34	Ciara Roberts (NIR)	12.433	9.333	9.008	12.166	42.940	
35	Kirsty Caruana (MLT)	12.666	7.433	10.400	11.466	41.965	
36	Pranati Das (IND)	12.666	8.000	8.966	10.233	39.965	
37	Bethany Dikau (CAY)	11.000	7.666	9.466	10.766	38.898	
38	Ridma Bengalage (SRI)	12.433	6.600	8.733	8.400	37.532	
39	Sachini Kawsalya Koswawaththa Liyanage (SRI)	12.633	6.700	8.933	8.400	36.666	
40	Tilanka Abayagunawardana (SRI)	12.733	6.433	8.033	8.733	35.932	

=== Vault ===
Position	Gymnast	Score 1	Score 2	Total	Notes
1	Claudia Fragapane (ENG)	14.641	14.266	14.453	Q
2	Ellie Black (CAN)	14.233	14.066	14.149	Q
3	Kirsten Beckett (RSA)	14.300	13.700	14.000	Q
4	Kelly Simm (ENG)	14.600	13.333	13.966	Q
5	Maegan Chant (CAN)	14.000	13.900	13.950	Q
6	Georgia-Rose Brown (AUS)	14.133	13.566	13.849	Q
7	Dipa Karmakar (IND)	13.200	14.400	13.800	Q
8	Emma White (SCO)	14.033	13.433	13.733	Q
9	Amy Regan (SCO)	13.966	13.400	13.683	R1
10	Yueh Tan Ing (MAS)	13.466	13.400	13.433	R2
11	Claudia Cummins (RSA)	13.900	12.866	13.383	
12	Farah Ann Abdul Hadi (MAS)	13.933	12.733	13.333	
13	Mackenzie Slee (NZL)	13.466	13.133	13.299	
14	Aruna Budda Reddy (IND)	13.500	12.841	13.170	
15	Bianca Mann (RSA)	13.366	12.833	13.099	
16	Grace Harrison (IOM)	13.300	12.733	13.016	
17	Nicole Burns (IOM)	12.866	12.800	12.833	
18	Tilanka Abayagunawardana (SRI)	12.733	12.033	12.383	
19	Peppijina Dalli (MLT)	11.800	12.933	12.366	
20	Ridma Bengalage (SRI)	12.433	11.633	12.033	
−	Ruby Harrold (ENG)	14.733	−	14.733	
−	Hannah Whelan (ENG)	14.300	−	14.300	
−	Stefanie Merkle (CAN)	14.066	−	14.066	
−	Mary Anne Monckton (AUS)	14.000	−	14.000	
−	Brittany Robertson (NZL)	13.966	−	13.966	
−	Isabella Maria Onyshko (CAN)	13.900	−	13.900	
−	Eizabeth Beddoe (WAL)	13.900	−	13.900	
−	Raer Theaker (WAL)	13.866	−	13.866	
−	Charlotte Sullivan (NZL)	13.800	−	13.800	
−	Jessica Hogg (WAL)	13.766	−	13.766	
−	Georgina Hockenhull (WAL)	13.666	−	13.666	
−	Heem Wei Lim (SIN)	13.500	−	13.500	
−	Lauren Mitchell (AUS)	13.433	−	13.433	
−	Tara Donnelly (IOM)	13.300	−	13.300	
−	Erin McLachlan (SCO)	13.300	−	13.300	
−	Nicole Mawhinney (NIR)	13.266	−	13.266	
−	Janessa Dai (SIN)	13.208	−	13.208	
−	Cara Kennedy (SCO)	13.133	−	13.133	
−	Pranati Nayak (IND)	13.066	−	13.066	
−	Ang Tracie (MAS)	13.066	−	13.066	
−	Ashly Lau (SIN)	13.066	−	13.066	
−	Michelle Teo (SIN)	13.066	−	13.066	
−	Stelutsa Savvidou (CYP)	12.800	−	12.800	
−	Sarah Beck (NIR)	12.700	−	12.700	
−	Pranati Das (IND)	12.666	−	12.666	
−	Kirsty Caruana (MLT)	12.666	−	12.666	
−	Kaitlin Kneen (IOM)	12.633	−	12.633	
−	Sachini Kosawlya Koswawaththa Liyanage (SRI)	12.633	−	12.633	
−	Charlotte Pollard (JER)	12.600	−	12.600	
−	Nur Eli Ellina Azmi (MAS)	12.600	−	12.600	
−	Olivia Vivian (AUS)	12.533	−	12.533	
−	Ciara Roberts (NIR)	12.433	−	12.433	
−	India McPeak (NIR)	12.266	−	12.266	
−	Adreana Jo Zammit (MLT)	11.233	−	11.233	
−	Bethany Dikau (CAY)	11.000	−	11.000	

=== Uneven bars ===
Position	Gymnast	Uneven bars	Notes
1	Becky Downie (ENG)	14.683	Q
2	Larissa Miller (AUS)	14.433	Q
3	Georgia-Rose Brown (AUS)	14.083	Q
4	Olivia Vivian (AUS)	13.800	
5	Elizabeth Beddoe (WAL)	13.533	Q
6	Ruby Harrold (ENG)	13.400	Q
7	Mary Anne Monckton (AUS)	13.333	
8	Claudia Fragapane (ENG)	13.333	
9	Ellie Black (CAN)	13.333	Q
10	Raer Theaker (WAL)	13.300	Q
11	Angel Romaeo (WAL)	13.033	
12	Kirsten Beckett (RSA)	12.966	Q
13	Maegan Chant (CAN)	12.700	R1
14	Georgina Hockenhull (WAL)	12.666	
15	Emma White (SCO)	12.466	R2
16	Hannah Whelan (ENG)	12.333	
17	Claudia Cummins (RSA)	12.133	
18	Bianca Mann (RSA)	12.100	
19	Erin McLachlan (SCO)	11.966	
20	Brittany Robertson (NZL)	11.866	
21	Ashly Lau (SIN)	11.800	
22	Amy Regan (SCO)	11.766	
23	Charlotte Sullivan (NZL)	11.766	
24	Anna Tempero (NZL)	11.733	
25	Farah Ann Abdul Hadi (MAS)	11.700	
26	Janessa Dai (SIN)	11.533	
27	Sarah Beck (NIR)	11.466	
28	Heem Wei Lim (SIN)	11.400	
29	Isabella Maria Onyshko (CAN)	11.400	
30	Carly Smith (SCO)	11.000	
31	Michelle Teo (SIN)	10.800	
32	Victoria Kayen Woo (CAN)	10.800	
33	Nicole Mawhinney (NIR)	10.700	
34	Stelutsa Savvidou (CYP)	10.458	
35	Kaitlin Kneen (IOM)	10.433	
36	Pranati Nayak (IND)	10.366	
37	Nur Eli Ellina Azmi (MAS)	10.266	
38	India McPeak (NIR)	10.200	
39	Tara Donnelly (IOM)	10.000	
40	Charlotte Pollard (JER)	9.766	
41	Dipa Karmakar (IND)	9.700	
42	Grace Harrison (IOM)	9.633	
43	Ang Tracie (MAS)	9.533	
44	Nicole Burns (IOM)	9.433	
45	Ciara Roberts (NIR)	9.333	
46	Yueh Tan Ing (MAS)	9.166	
47	Peppijina Dalli (MLT)	8.666	
48	Pranati Das (IND)	8.000	
49	Bethany Dikau (CAY)	7.666	
50	Rucha Sachin Divekar (IND)	7.666	
51	Kirsty Caruana (MLT)	7.433	
52	Sachini Kasawlya Koswawaththa Liyanage (SRI)	6.700	
53	Ridma Bengalage (SRI)	6.600	
54	Tilanka Abayagunawardana (SRI)	6.433	

=== Balance beam ===
Position	Gymnast	Balance beam	Notes
1	Claudia Fragapane (ENG)	14.033	Q
2	Lauren Mitchell (AUS)	13.966	Q
3	Ellie Black (CAN)	13.966	Q
4	Georgina Hockenhull (WAL)	13.333	Q
5	Becky Downie (ENG)	13.200	Q
6	Elizabeth Beddoe (WAL)	13.166	Q
7	Isabela Onyshko (CAN)	13.133	Q
8	Mary Anne Monckton (AUS)	13.100	Q
9	Angel Romaeo (WAL)	13.066	
10	Hannah Whelan (ENG)	13.033	
11	Joey Tam (SIN)	12.900	R1
12	Heem Wei Lim (SIN)	12.886	R2
13	Charlotte Sullivan (NZL)	12.766	
14	Kirsten Beckett (RSA)	12.733	
15	Erin McLachlan (SCO)	12.600	
16	Ruby Harrold (ENG)	12.466	
17	Jessica Hogg (WAL)	12.366	
18	Maegan Chant (CAN)	12.333	
19	Farah Ann Abdul Hadi (MAS)	12.166	
20	Dipa Karmakar (IND)	11.966	
21	Stefanie Merkle (CAN)	11.966	
22	Amy Regan (SCO)	11.866	
23	Brittany Robertson (NZL)	11.700	
24	Claudia Cummins (RSA)	11.600	
25	Nicole Mawhinney (NIR)	11.533	
26	Cara Kennedy (SCO)	11.500	
27	Tara Donnelly (IOM)	11.483	
28	Janessa Dai (SIN)	11.400	
29	Grace Harrison (IOM)	11.366	
30	Yueh Tan Ing (MAS)	11.333	
31	Stelutsa Savvidou (CYP)	11.333	
32	Nur Eli Ellina Azmi (MAS)	11.266	
33	Olivia Vivian (AUS)	11.266	
34	Sarah Beck (NIR)	11.233	
35	India McPeak (NIR)	11.233	
36	Georgia Rose Brown (AUS)	11.200	
37	Emma White (SCO)	11.066	
38	Bianca Mann (RSA)	10.900	
39	Aruna Budda Reddy (IND)	10.466	
40	Kirsty Caruana (MLT)	10.400	
41	Charlotte Pollard (JER)	10.366	
42	Pranati Nayak (IND)	10.333	
43	Ang Tracie (MAS)	10.316	
44	Nicole Burns (IOM)	10.100	
45	Kaitlin Kneen (IOM)	9.666	
46	Bethany Dikau (CAY)	9.466	
47	Adreana Jo Zammit (MLT)	9.200	
48	Ciara Roberts (NIR)	9.008	
49	Pranati Das (IND)	8.966	
50	Sachini Kawsalya Koswawaththa Liyanage (SRI)	8.933	
51	Ridma Bengalage (SRI)	8.733	
52	Tilanka Abayagunawardana (SRI)	8.033	

=== Floor exercise ===
Position	Gymnast	Floor (gymnastics)	Notes
1	Claudia Fragapane (ENG)	14.733	Q
2	Lauren Mitchell (AUS)	14.100	Q
3	Hannah Whelan (ENG)	13.700	Q
4	Stefanie Merkle (CAN)	13.633	Q
5	Ruby Harrold (ENG)	13.466	
6	Ellie Black (CAN)	13.633	Q
7	Charlotte Sullivan (NZL)	13.466	Q
8	Jessica Hogg (WAL)	13.266	Q
9	Kirsten Beckett (RSA)	13.266	Q
10	Elizabeth Beddoe (WAL)	13.166	R1
11	Olivia Vivian (AUS)	13.166	R2
12	Maegan Chant (CAN)	13.133	
13	Ang Tracie (MAS)	13.066	
14	Isabella Maria Onyshko (CAN)	12.966	
15	Brittany Robertson (NZL)	12.958	
16	Farah Ann Abdul Hadi (MAS)	12.833	
17	Amy Regan (SCO)	12.833	
18	Grace Harrison (IOM)	12.833	
19	Emma White (SCO)	12.766	
20	Janessa Dai (SIN)	12.766	
21	Angel Romaeo (WAL)	12.700	
22	Heem Wei Lim (SIN)	12.533	
23	Cara Kennedy (SCO)	12.533	
24	Kelly Simm (ENG)	12.466	
25	Nicole Burns (IOM)	12.433	
26	Nicole Mawhinney (NIR)	12.433	
27	Bianca Mann (RSA)	12.366	
28	Georgina Hockenhull (WAL)	12.366	
29	Ciara Roberts (NIR)	12.166	
30	Larrissa Miller (AUS)	12.166	
31	Dipa Karmakar (IND)	12.066	
32	Stelutsa Savvidou (CYP)	12.000	
33	Nur Eli Ellina Azmi (MAS)	11.808	
34	Katilin Kneen (IOM)	11.733	
35	Tara Donnelly (IOM)	11.733	
36	Claudia Cummins (RSA)	11.733	
37	Carly Smith (SCO)	11.566	
38	Michelle Teo (SIN)	11.533	
39	Kirsty Caruana (MLT)	11.466	
40	Yueh Tan Ing (MAS)	11.300	
41	Ashly Lau (SIN)	11.300	
42	Aruna Budda Reddy (IND)	11.300	
43	Charlotte Pollard (JER)	11.266	
44	Georgia Rose Brown (AUS)	11.066	
45	Sarah Beck (NIR)	10.966	
46	Bethany Dikau (CAY)	10.766	
47	Pranati Nayak (IND)	10.391	
48	Pranati Das (IND)	10.233	
49	Adreana Jo Zammit (MLT)	9.766	
50	Ridma Bengalage (SRI)	9.766	
51	Tilanka Abayagunawardana (SRI)	8.733	
52	Sachini Kawsalya Koswawaththa Liyanage (SRI)	8.400	
