= Pakkala (surname) =

Pakkala is a city district in Vantaa, Finland.

Pakkala may also refer to:

== People ==
- Anna Erika Pakkala (born 1995), Finnish female artistic gymnast
- Teuvo Pakkala (1862-1925), Finnish author, playwright, reporter, linguist, and teacher
- Juho Heikki Pakkala (1877-1952), Finnish farmer and politician
