= Gymnastics at the 2016 Summer Olympics – Qualification =

This article describes the qualifying phase for gymnastics at the 2016 Summer Olympics. Qualification was based on the results of the three world gymnastics championships (rhythmic, artistic and trampoline) held in autumn 2015, and Olympic Test Events held in early 2016 at the HSBC Arena. In addition, the Fédération Internationale de Gymnastique and the IOC Tripartite Commission for Gymnastics allocated places to ensure certain minimum levels of representation.

== Summary ==
Sports men and women of the states in the table below qualified for the Olympics

Nation	Artistic		Rhythmic		Trampoline		Total
Nation	Men	Women	Individual	Group	Men	Women	Total
Algeria	1	1					2
Argentina	1	1					2
Armenia	2	1					3
Australia		1	1		1		3
Austria		1					1
Azerbaijan	2		1				3
Belarus	1	1	2	5	1	2	12
Belgium	1	5					6
Brazil	5	5	1	5	1		17
Bulgaria			1	5			6
Canada	1	5			1	1	8
Cape Verde			1				1
Chile	1	1					2
China	5	5	1	5	2	2	20
Chinese Taipei	1						1
Colombia	1	1					2
Croatia	1	1					2
Cuba	2	1					3
Cyprus	1						1
Czech Republic	1						1
Egypt		1					1
Finland	1		1				2
France	5	5	1		1	1	13
Georgia			1			1	2
Germany	5	5	1	5		1	17
Great Britain	5	5			1	2	13
Greece	2	1	1	5			9
Guatemala		1					1
Hungary	1	1					2
Iceland		1					1
India		1					1
Ireland	1	1					2
Israel	1		1	5			7
Italy	1	5	1	5			12
Jamaica		1					1
Japan	5	5	1	5	2	1	19
Kazakhstan			1		1		2
Lithuania	1						1
Mexico	1	1					2
Monaco	1						1
Netherlands	5	5					10
New Zealand	1	1			1		3
North Korea	1	1					2
Norway	1						1
Panama		1					1
Peru		1					1
Poland		1					1
Portugal		1			1	1	3
Romania	2	1	1				4
Russia	5	5	2	5	2	1	20
Slovakia		1					1
Slovenia		1					1
South Africa	1						1
South Korea	5	1	1				7
Spain	2	1	1	5			9
Sweden		1					1
Switzerland	5	1					6
Trinidad and Tobago		1					1
Turkey	1	1					2
Ukraine	5	1	1	5		1	13
United States	5	5	1	5	1	1	18
Uzbekistan	1	1	1	5		1	9
Venezuela		1					1
Vietnam	1	1					2
Total: 62 NOCs	98	98	26	70	16	16	324

* Artistic gymnastics, NOCs with 5 entered athletes may also enter the team competition.

== Timeline ==
Event	Date	Venue
2015 World Rhythmic Gymnastics Championships	September 7–15, 2015	(Germany) Stuttgart
2015 World Artistic Gymnastics Championships	October 23 – November 1, 2015	(United Kingdom) Glasgow
2015 Trampoline World Championships	November 25–28, 2015	(Denmark) Odense
Olympic Test Event	April 16–22, 2016	(Brazil) Rio de Janeiro

== Artistic ==
=== Men's events ===
Event	Standard	Qualified gymnast
Teams of five
World Championships	Team places 1–8	Japan; Great Britain; China; Russia; United States; Switzerland; South Korea; Brazil
Olympic Test Event (teams that placed 9–16 at the World; Championships qualified to the test event)	Team places 1–4	Germany; Ukraine; Netherlands; France
Total		12 (60 gymnasts)
Individuals
World Championships (Individual apparatus medalists)	Floor	Rayderley Zapata (ESP)
World Championships (Individual apparatus medalists)	Vault	Ri Se-gwang (PRK); Marian Drăgulescu (ROU)
World Championships (Individual apparatus medalists)	Pommel horse	Harutyun Merdinyan (ARM)
World Championships (Individual apparatus medalists)	Rings	Eleftherios Petrounias (GRE)
World Championships (Individual apparatus medalists)	Parallel bars	Oleg Stepko (AZE)
World Championships (Individual apparatus medalists)	Horizontal bar	Manrique Larduet (CUB)
Reserved places	Host nation	Host nation qualified above
Reserved places	Tripartite invitation	Kevin Crovetto (MON)
Reserved places	Africa	Mohamed Bourguieg (ALG)
Olympic Test Event	Individual all-around placings (max. 1 per NOC)	Andrei Muntean (ROU)*; Néstor Abad (ESP)*; Dennis Goossens (BEL)*; Scott Morgan (CAN)*; Jossimar Calvo (COL)**; Daniel Corral (MEX)**; Andrey Likhovitskiy (BLR); Alexander Shatilov (ISR); Ferhat Arican (TUR); Artur Davtyan (ARM); Randy Lerú (CUB); Filip Ude (CRO); Petro Pakhnyuk (AZE); Anton Fokin (UZB); Oskar Kirmes (FIN); Ludovico Edalli (ITA); Stian Skjerahaug (NOR); David Jessen (CZE); Robert Tvorogal (LTU); Phạm Phước Hưng (VIE); Marios Georgiou (CYP); Kieran Behan (IRL); Vlasios Maras (GRE); ~~Gustavo Simões (POR)~~; Mikhail Koudinov (NZL); Ryan Patterson (RSA); Tomás González (CHI); Vid Hidvégi (HUN)**; Lee Chih-kai (TPE); Nicolás Córdoba (ARG)
Total		98

* NOC chose any team gymnast
** NOC chose between 2 gymnasts

=== Women's events ===
Event	Standard	Qualified gymnast
Teams of five
World Championships	Team places 1–8	United States; China; Great Britain; Russia; Japan; Canada; Italy; Netherlands
Olympic Test Event (teams that placed 9–16 at the World; Championships qualified to the test event)	Team places 1–4	Brazil; Germany; Belgium; France
Total		12 (60 gymnasts)
Individuals
World Championships (Individual apparatus medalists)	Floor	All medalists qualified above
World Championships (Individual apparatus medalists)	Vault	Hong Un-jong (PRK)
World Championships (Individual apparatus medalists)	Uneven bars	All medalists qualified above
World Championships (Individual apparatus medalists)	Balance beam	All medalists qualified above
Reserved places	Host nation	Host nation qualified above
Reserved places	Tripartite invitation	Isabella Amado (PAN)
Reserved places	Africa	Farah Boufadene (ALG); ~~Claudia Cummins (RSA)~~; Sherine El-Zeiny (EGY)
Olympic Test Event	Individual all-around placings (max. 1 per NOC)	Larrissa Miller (AUS)*; Giulia Steingruber (SUI)*; Cătălina Ponor (ROU)*; Lee Eun-ju (KOR)*; Ana Sofía Gómez (GUA); Jessica López (VEN); Vasiliki Millousi (GRE)**; Zsófia Kovács (HUN)**; Ana Pérez (ESP)**; Angelina Kysla (UKR); Alexa Moreno (MEX)**; Marcia Videaux (CUB); Ana Filipa Martins (POR); Katarzyna Jurkowska-Kowalska (POL)**; Lisa Ecker (AUT); Toni-Ann Williams (JAM); Irina Sazonova (ISL); Phan Thị Hà Thanh (VIE); Dipa Karmakar (IND); Barbora Mokošová (SVK); Courtney McGregor (NZL); Oksana Chusovitina (UZB); Houry Gebeshian (ARM); Ariana Orrego (PER); Simona Castro (CHI); Teja Belak (SLO); Tutya Yılmaz (TUR); Emma Larsson (SWE); Marisa Dick (TTO); Ana Đerek (CRO); Catalina Escobar (COL); Kylie Dickson (BLR); Ellis O'Reilly (IRL); Ailen Valente (ARG)
Total		98

* NOC chose any team gymnast
** NOC chose between 2 gymnasts

== Rhythmic ==
=== Individual all-around ===
Event	Standard	Qualified NOC
World Championships	Places 1–15 (max. 2 per NOC)	Russia; Russia; Belarus; Georgia; Ukraine; Azerbaijan; Israel; United States; Spain; Bulgaria; South Korea; France; Belarus; Greece; Japan
Olympic Test Event (26 participants, including NOCs ranked 16-24 and best 13 gymnasts not qualified to all-around final in WC)	Top 8 (max. 1 per NOC)	Kazakhstan; Austria; Italy; Finland; Uzbekistan; Romania; China; Germany
FIG Executive Board invitations	Host nation	Brazil
FIG Executive Board invitations	Continents not qualified (1 place)	Australia
FIG Executive Board invitations	Tripartite commission (1 place)	Cape Verde
Total		26

=== Group all-around ===
Event	Standard	Qualified team
World Championships	All-around places 1-10 (min 3 continents)	Russia; Bulgaria; Spain; Italy; Japan; Israel; Belarus; China; Ukraine; United States
Olympic Test Event (places 11-16 from WC and host nation)	Top 3	Germany; Uzbekistan; Greece
FIG Executive Board invitations	Host nation	Brazil
Total		14

== Trampoline ==
=== Men's event ===
Event	Standard	Qualified NOC
World Championships	Top 8 (max. 2 per NOC)	China; Belarus; Russia; Japan; Russia; France; China; Japan
Olympic Test Event (16 participants)	Top 7 (max. 1 per NOC)	New Zealand; Portugal; United States; Great Britain; Australia; Canada; Kazakhstan
FIG Executive Board invitations	Host nation and each continent	Brazil
FIG Executive Board invitations	Tripartite invitation	—
Total		16

=== Women's event ===
Event	Standard	Qualified NOC
World Championships	Top 8 (max. 2 per NOC)	China; China; Belarus; Canada; Great Britain; Belarus; Great Britain; Georgia
Olympic Test Event (16 participants)	Top 8 (max. 1 per NOC)	Russia; Ukraine; Japan; Uzbekistan; Germany; Portugal; United States; France
FIG Executive Board invitations	Host nation and each continent	—
FIG Executive Board invitations	Tripartite invitation	—
Total		16
