= Iley =

Iley is a surname. Notable people with the surname include:

- Daniel Iley (born 1996), Scottish gymnast
- Jason Iley, English executive
- Jim Iley (1935–2018), English football player and manager
- John Iley (born 1967), English aerodynamicist

== See also ==
- Riley (surname)
- Tiley
