= 2013 Northern European Gymnastics Championships =

Gymnastics competition in Northern Ireland

- Venue: Lagan Valley LeisurePlex in Lisburn,
- Location: Lisburn, Northern Ireland
- Start date: 23 November 2013
- End date: 24 November 2013

The 2013 Northern European Gymnastics Championships was an artistic gymnastics competition held in Lisburn, Northern Ireland. The event was held between 23 and 24 November at the Lagan Valley LeisurePlex.

== Medal table ==
Event	Gold	Silver	Bronze
Men
Team all-around	Finland; Oskar Kirmes; Niva Heikki; Kanerva Juho; Markku Vahtila; Tomi Tuuha	Scotland; Andrew Mackie; Daniel Iley; Daniel Keatings; Tom Barnes; Liam Davie	Wales; Clinton Purnell; Grant Gardiner; Harry Owen; Iwan Mepham; Jac Davies
Individual all-around	Stian Skjerahaug (NOR)	Oskar Kirmes (FIN)	Clinton Purnell (WAL)
Floor	Christopher O'Connor (IRL)	Clinton Purnell (WAL)	Oskar Kirmes (FIN)
Pommel horse	Juho Kanerva (FIN)	Daniel Keatings (SCO)	Stian Skjerahaug (NOR)
Rings	Markku Vahtila (FIN)	Clinton Purnell (WAL)	Lars Jorgen Fjeld (NOR)
Vault	Tomi Tuuha (FIN)	Haakon Andreassen (NOR) Øssur Eiriksfoss (FAR)	None awarded
Parallel bars	Stian Skjerahaug (NOR)	Heikki Niva (FIN)	Grant Gardiner (WAL)
Horizontal bar	Liam Davie (SCO)	Pontus Kallanvaara (SWE)	Stian Skjerahaug (NOR)
Women
Team all-around	Wales; Elizabeth Beddoe; Georgina Hockenhull; Jessica Hogg; Rebecca Moore; Rhyannon Jones	Scotland; Amy Regan; Cara Kennedy; Carly Smith; Emma White; Erin McLachlan	Northern Ireland; Casey Jo Bell; Emma Gorman; India McPeak; Nicole Mawhinney; Sarah Beck
Individual all-around	Georgina Hockenhull (WAL)	Amy Regan (SCO)	Elizabeth Beddoe (WAL)
Vault	Amy Regan (SCO)	Casey Jo Bell (NIR)	Erin McLachlan (SCO)
Uneven bars	Casey Jo Bell (NIR) Erika Pakkala (FIN)	None awarded	Emma White (SCO)
Balance beam	Erin McLachlan (SCO)	Amy Regan (SCO)	Martine Skregelid (NOR)
Floor	Amy Regan (SCO)	Erin McLachlan (SCO)	Casey Jo Bell (NIR)

== Medal table ==
Rank	Nation	Gold	Silver	Bronze	Total
1	Finland (FIN)	5	2	1	8
2	Scotland (SCO)	4	6	2	12
3	Wales (WAL)	2	2	4	8
4	Norway (NOR)	2	1	4	7
5	Northern Ireland (NIR)	1	1	2	4
6	Ireland (IRL)	1	0	0	1
7	Faroe Islands (FAR)	0	1	0	1
7	Sweden (SWE)	0	1	0	1
Totals (8 entries)		15	14	13	42
