= Marcela Torres =

Swedish artistic gymnast

- Full name: Marcela Soledad Torres
- Born: 4 October 1988 (age 37) Chaco Province, Argentina

Gymnastics career
- Discipline: Women's artistic gymnastics
- Country represented: Sweden
- Former countries represented: Argentina
- Club: All Star Gymnastics Stockholm
Medal record
Representing Sweden
Northern European Championships
Gold medal – first place	2017 Tórshavn	Vault

Marcela Soledad Torres (born 4 October 1988) is an Argentine-born Swedish artistic gymnast.

== Personal life ==
Marcela Torres was born on 4 October 1988 in Argentina, and she moved to Sweden in 2012. She became eligible to represent Sweden in 2015.

== Gymnastics career ==
Torres competed on vault at the 2015 European Championships, and she was the third reserve for the event final. She won the all-around title at the 2015 Swedish Championships. At the Anadia World Cup, she finished 5th in the vault event final. At the 2015 Belgium-Sweden-Austria Friendly, the Swedish team finished 2nd. She then competed at the 2015 World Championships with Ece Ayan, Stina Lovisa Estberg, Emma Larsson, Veronica Wagner, and Kim Singmuang, and the team finished 22nd.

At the 2016 Doha World Cup, Torres finished 5th on vault. She won the gold medal on vault at the 2016 Nordic Championships. At the 2016 Swedish Championships, she won gold medals in the all-around, vault, and balance beam. She competed on vault at the 2016 European Championships and was the third reserve for the event final.

Torres won the gold medal in the all-around, uneven bars, and balance beam at the 2017 Swedish Championships. She then won the gold medal on the vault at the 2017 Northern European Championships. She won the silver medal in the all-around behind Jessica Castles at the 2018 Swedish Championships. She competed at the 2018 World Championships, but she did not qualify for any event finals.
