= Kim Singmuang =

Swedish artistic gymnast

- Full name: Kim Chuthathip Singmuang
- Born: 7 April 1998 (age 28) Udon Thani, Thailand

Gymnastics career
- Discipline: Women's artistic gymnastics
- Country represented: Sweden
- Club: Eskilstuna GF
- Head coaches: Helena Andersson, Sebastian Melander
Medal record
Representing Sweden
Northern European Championships
Gold medal – first place	2011 Uppsala	Team
Gold medal – first place	2011 Uppsala	Vault
Silver medal – second place	2011 Uppsala	All-around

Kim Chuthathip Singmuang (born 7 April 1998) is a Thai-born Swedish artistic gymnast.

== Gymnastics career ==
=== Junior ===
Singmuang competed at the 2011 Northern European Championships, and the Swedish team won the gold medal. Individually, Singmuang won the gold medal on the vault and the silver medal in the all-around. She competed at the 2012 Junior European Championships and helped the Swedish team finish 9th. At the 2013 Nordic Junior Championships, she won the silver medal in the all-around behind Emma Larsson. She competed at the 2013 European Youth Summer Olympic Festival alongside Larsson and Ece Ayan, and they finished 6th as a team. Individually, she finished 12th in the all-around final.

=== Senior ===
Singmuang won the bronze medal on the uneven bars at the 2014 Osijek World Cup behind Yong Mi Kang and Noémi Makra. She competed at the 2014 European Championships with Emma Larsson, Jonna Adlerteg, Stina Lovisa Estberg, and Nicole Vanstroem, and the team finished 12th. The same team plus Veronica Wagner competed at the 2014 World Championships, and the team finished 21st.

Singmuang competed on the uneven bars at the 2015 European Championships, but she did not qualify for the event final. She won the uneven bars gold medal at the 2015 Swedish Championships. At the Belgium-Sweden-Austria Friendly, the Swedish team finished 2nd, and Singmuang won the bronze medal on the balance beam. She then competed at the 2015 World Championships with Ece Ayan, Stina Lovisa Estberg, Emma Larsson, Veronica Wagner, and Marcela Torres, and the team finished 22nd.
