= Gymnastics at the 2016 Summer Olympics – Women's artistic qualification =

Qualification for women's artistic gymnastic competitions at the 2016 Summer Olympics was held at the HSBC Arena on 7 August 2016. The results of the qualification determined the qualifiers to the finals: 8 teams in the team final, 24 gymnasts in the individual all-around final, and 8 gymnasts in each of 4 apparatus finals. The competition was divided into 5 subdivisions.

== Subdivisions ==
Gymnasts from nations taking part in the team all-around event are grouped together while the other gymnasts are grouped into one of eight mixed groups. The groups were divided into the five subdivisions after a draw held by the Fédération Internationale de Gymnastique. The groups rotate through each of the four apparatuses together.

=== Subdivision 1 ===
- Belgium
- China
- Mixed Group 1
  - Toni-Ann Williams (JAM)
  - Isabella Amado Medrano (PAN)
  - Lee Eun-ju (KOR)
  - Ellis O'Reilly (IRL)
  - Hong Un-jong (PRK)
- Mixed Group 7
  - Simona Castro (CHI)
  - Tutya Yılmaz (TUR)
  - Ana Đerek (CRO)
  - Larrissa Miller (AUS)
  - Oksana Chusovitina (UZB)

=== Subdivision 2 ===
- Russia
- Italy
- Mixed Group 5
  - Catalina Escobar (COL)
  - Kylie Dickson (BLR)
  - Ailen Valente (ARG)
  - Farah Boufadene (ALG)
  - Houry Gebeshian (ARM)
- Mixed Group 6
  - Cătălina Ponor (ROU)
  - Lisa Ecker (AUT)
  - Giulia Steingruber (SUI)
  - Zsófia Kovács (HUN)
  - Ana Pérez (ESP)

=== Subdivision 3 ===
- Germany
- Great Britain
- Brazil
- Mixed Group 8
  - Barbora Mokošová (SVK)
  - Ana Sofía Gómez (GUA)
  - Emma Larsson (SWE)
  - Dipa Karmakar (IND)
  - Phan Thị Hà Thanh (VIE)

=== Subdivision 4 ===
- Netherlands
- United States
- Mixed Group 2
  - Jessica López (VEN)
  - Teja Belak (SLO)
  - Ariana Orrego (PER)
  - Marisa Dick (TTO)
  - Vasiliki Millousi (GRE)
- Mixed Group 4
  - Sherine El-Zeiny (EGY)
  - Irina Sazonova (ISL)
  - Courtney McGregor (NZL)

=== Subdivision 5 ===
- Japan
- France
- Canada
- Mixed Group 3
  - Alexa Moreno (MEX)
  - Marcia Videaux (CUB)
  - Ana Filipa Martins (POR)
  - Katarzyna Jurkowska-Kowalska (POL)
  - Angelina Kysla (UKR)

== Qualification results ==
Team	Vault (gymnastics)		Uneven bars		Balance beam		Floor (gymnastics)		Total (All-around)	
Team	Score	Rank	Score	Rank	Score	Rank	Score	Rank	Score	Rank
United States	46.966	1	46.632	2	45.832	1	45.808	1	185.238	1
Simone Biles (USA)	16.000/16.100 Avg: 16.050	1	15.000	14	15.633	1	15.733	1	62.366	1
Aly Raisman (USA)	15.766		14.733	22	14.833	=7	15.275	2	60.607	2
Gabby Douglas (USA)	15.166		15.766	3	14.833	=7	14.366	9	60.131	3
Laurie Hernandez (USA)	15.200				15.366	2	14.800	4		
Madison Kocian (USA)			15.866	1						
China	44.515	5	45.166	4	43.332	4	42.266	4	175.279	2
Wang Yan (CHN)	14.933/14.966 Avg: 14.949	7	13.900	44	14.100	26	14.666	6	57.599	7
Shang Chunsong (CHN)	12.766		15.300	8	14.366	17	14.100	16	56.532	20
Fan Yilin (CHN)			15.266	9	14.866	6	13.500	=40		
Tan Jiaxin (CHN)	14.766		14.600	28						
Mao Yi (CHN)	14.816						11.700	78		
Russia	44.832	3	46.649	1	41.998	8	41.141	10	174.620	3
Seda Tutkhalyan (RUS)	14.733/14.733 Avg: 14.733	10	15.133	11	14.466	14	13.875	25	58.207	5
Aliya Mustafina (RUS)	15.166		15.833	2	13.033	59	14.066	17	58.098	6
Angelina Melnikova (RUS)	14.933		15.100	13	13.266	54	13.200	53	56.499	22
Daria Spiridonova (RUS)			15.683	4	14.266	=19	12.033	74		
Maria Paseka (RUS)	14.733/15.366 Avg: 15.049	4								
Great Britain	44.432	7	44.666	5	42.400	6	42.566	3	174.064	4
Ellie Downie (GBR)	14.833/14.533 Avg: 14.683	11	14.633	26	14.500	11	12.500	72	56.466	24
Claudia Fragapane (GBR)	14.766		12.533	69	13.400	48	14.333	11	55.032	30
Amy Tinkler (GBR)	14.833				14.500	12	14.600	7		
Ruby Harrold (GBR)	14.600		14.800	=19			13.633	35		
Becky Downie (GBR)			15.233	10	13.300	52				
Brazil	45.299	2	43.357	9	43.599	3	41.799	7	174.054	5
Rebeca Andrade (BRA)	15.566		14.933	15	14.200	22	14.033	20	58.732	4
Flávia Saraiva (BRA)	14.633		12.733	67	15.133	3	14.033	19	56.532	19
Jade Barbosa (BRA)	14.900		14.266	35	13.600	42	13.733	30	56.499	23
Lorrane Oliveira (BRA)	14.833		14.158	39						
Daniele Hypólito (BRA)					14.266	=19	12.400	73		
Germany	43.333	9	45.699	3	42.499	5	41.732	8	173.263	6
Elisabeth Seitz (GER)	14.100		15.466	5	13.866	31	13.666	34	57.098	11
Sophie Scheder (GER)	13.966		15.433	6	12.933	62	13.266	47	55.598	28
Pauline Schäfer (GER)	14.400				14.400	15	14.300	12		
Tabea Alt (GER)	14.833		14.666	25	14.233	21				
Kim Bùi (GER)			14.800	=19			13.766	29		
Japan	44.466	6	44.100	6	41.699	9	42.299	5	172.564	7
Mai Murakami (JPN)	14.700		14.166	38	13.833	34	14.566	8	57.265	9
Asuka Teramoto (JPN)	14.800		14.900	16	13.666	39	13.700	32	57.066	12
Aiko Sugihara (JPN)	14.300		14.400	33	14.133	25	14.033	21	56.866	16
Yuki Uchiyama (JPN)			14.800	18	13.733	37				
Sae Miyakawa (JPN)	14.966/13.766 Avg: 14.366	16					13.266	49		
Netherlands	43.132	10	43.866	7	43.732	2	41.199	9	171.929	8
Eythora Thorsdottir (NED)	14.900		14.733	21	14.300	18	13.633	36	57.566	8
Lieke Wevers (NED)	13.966		14.600	27	14.366	16	13.850	27	56.782	17
Céline van Gerner (NED)	13.766		14.533	29	13.800	35	13.716	31	55.815	25
Sanne Wevers (NED)			14.408	32	15.066	4				
Vera van Pol (NED)	14.266						13.500	=40		
Canada	44.732	4	43.499	8	41.565	11	41.965	6	171.761	9
Ellie Black (CAN)	14.766/14.233 Avg: 14.499	15	14.500	31	13.566	44	14.133	15	56.965	13
Isabela Onyshko (CAN)	14.000		14.733	23	14.533	10	13.966	22	57.232	10
Brittany Rogers (CAN)	14.666/14.900 Avg: 14.783	9	14.266	36	13.466	45				
Rose-Kaying Woo (CAN)			13.733	52	13.233	55	13.566	38		
Shallon Olsen (CAN)	15.300/14.600 Avg: 14.950	6					13.866	26		
Italy	43.366	8	42.266	12	40.332	12	43.432	2	169.396	10
Carlotta Ferlito (ITA)	14.300		14.033	42	13.233	56	14.033	18	55.599	27
Vanessa Ferrari (ITA)	14.533		13.866	47	12.000	75	14.866	3	55.265	29
Elisa Meneghini (ITA)	14.166				14.166	=23	14.233	13		
Erika Fasana (ITA)			14.200	37	12.933	63	14.333	10		
Martina Rizzelli (ITA)	14.533		14.033	43						
France	42.299	11	43.099	10	42.399	7	40.899	12	168.696	11
Marine Brevet (FRA)	14.133		14.333	34	14.166	=23	13.933	23	56.565	18
Louise Vanhille (FRA)	13.966		14.866	17	13.633	40	13.300	45	55.765	26
Oréane Lechenault (FRA)	12.300		13.166	60	13.633	41	13.666	33	52.765	46
Marine Boyer (FRA)	14.200				14.600	9	13.233	50		
Loan His (FRA)			13.900	46						
Belgium	42.033	12	43.041	11	41.765	10	40.999	11	167.838	12
Nina Derwael (BEL)	13.900		15.133	12	13.966	=28	13.533	39	56.532	21
Rune Hermans (BEL)	13.133		13.775	50	13.700	38	13.900	24	54.508	34
Gaëlle Mys (BEL)	14.133				13.833	33	13.566	37		
Laura Waem (BEL)			14.133	41	13.966	=28	13.366	44		
Senna Deriks (BEL)	14.000		13.533	56						
Jessica López (VEN)	14.933		15.333	7	13.933	30	12.733	65	56.932	14
Giulia Steingruber (SUI)	15.600/14.933 Avg: 15.266	3	13.900	45	12.733	68	14.666	5	56.899	15
Alexa Moreno (MEX)	14.400/14.866 Avg: 14.633	12	13.333	59	13.300	51	13.833	28	54.866	31
Ana Sofía Gómez (GUA)	14.766		13.766	51	13.400	47	12.900	62	54.832	32
Zsófia Kovács (HUN)	14.866/14.158 Avg: 14.512	14	14.733	24	12.233	72	12.766	64	54.598	33
Emma Larsson (SWE)	14.066		12.766	65	14.000	27	13.500	42	54.332	35
Ana Pérez (ESP)	13.933		13.633	55	13.600	43	13.133	55	54.299	36
Ana Filipa Martins (POR)	13.366		13.666	54	13.833	32	13.433	43	54.298	37
Houry Gebeshian (ARM)	14.016		13.666	53	13.266	53	12.900	61	53.848	38
Sherine El-Zeiny (EGY)	13.766		14.133	40	12.800	66	12.533	69	53.232	39
Irina Sazonova (ISL)	13.800		13.500	58	12.900	64	13.000	60	53.200	40
Courtney McGregor (NZL)	14.666/14.400 Avg: 14.533	13	12.433	70	13.000	61	13.066	57	53.165	41
Tutya Yılmaz (TUR)	13.733		12.166	74	14.500	13	12.733	66	53.132	42
Lisa Ecker (AUT)	14.100		12.200	73	13.400	46	13.266	48	52.966	43
Isabella Amado Medrano (PAN)	13.900		12.733	66	13.333	49	12.866	63	52.832	44
Barbora Mokošová (SVK)	13.933		13.800	49	12.033	74	13.033	59	52.799	45
Angelina Kysla (UKR)	13.958		12.533	68	12.666	69	13.066	56	52.233	47
Marcia Videaux (CUB)	13.433/14.933 Avg: 14.181	18	13.825	48	11.700	76	13.066	58	52.024	48
Katarzyna Jurkowska-Kowalska (POL)	14.455		11.700	76	12.333	71	13.300	46	51.799	49
Ariana Orrego (PER)	14.066		11.833	75	12.733	67	13.166	54	51.798	50
Dipa Karmakar (IND)	15.100/14.600 Avg: 14.850	8	11.666	77	12.866	65	12.033	75	51.665	51
Simona Castro (CHI)	13.733		12.833	63	13.000	60	11.833	77	51.399	52
Lee Eun-ju (KOR)	12.800		13.500	57	12.533	70	12.566	68	51.399	53
Toni-Ann Williams (JAM)	14.100		11.533	78	12.133	73	13.200	51	50.966	54
Marisa Dick (TTO)	13.900		11.333	79	13.066	58	12.533	70	50.832	55
Ailen Valente (ARG)	13.666		13.033	62	11.366	78	12.000	76	50.065	56
Ellis O'Reilly (IRL)	13.266		12.300	71	10.700	79	11.666	79	47.932	57
Kylie Dickson (BLR)	13.866		12.833	64	10.333	81	10.766	81	47.798	58
Farah Boufadene (ALG)	12.533		12.200	72	10.600	80	11.100	80	46.433	59
Cătălina Ponor (ROU)					14.900	5	14.200	14		
Phan Thị Hà Thanh (VIE)	14.700/13.766 Avg: 14.233	17			13.800	36				
Oksana Chusovitina (UZB)	15.166/14.833 Avg: 14.999	5			13.300	50				
Hong Un-jong (PRK)	15.766/15.600 Avg: 15.683	2					12.533	71		
Larrissa Miller (AUS)			14.533	30			12.733	67		
Catalina Escobar (COL)			13.058	61	10.200	82	3.700	82		
Ana Đerek (CRO)	0.000				11.433	77	13.200	52		
Teja Belak (SLO)	13.500/13.800 Avg: 13.650	19								
Vasiliki Millousi (GRE)					13.200	57				

=== Individual all-around final qualifiers ===
Rank	Gymnast	Vault (gymnastics)	Uneven bars	Balance beam	Floor (gymnastics)	Total
1	Simone Biles (USA)	16.000	15.000	15.633	15.733	62.366
2	Aly Raisman (USA)	15.766	14.733	14.833	15.275	60.607
3	Rebeca Andrade (BRA)	15.566	14.933	14.200	14.033	58.732
4	Seda Tutkhalyan (RUS)	14.733	15.133	14.466	13.875	58.207
5	Aliya Mustafina (RUS)	15.166	15.833	13.033	14.066	58.098
6	Wang Yan (CHN)	14.933	13.900	14.100	14.666	57.599
7	Eythora Thorsdottir (NED)	14.900	14.733	14.300	13.633	57.566
8	Mai Murakami (JPN)	14.700	14.166	13.833	14.566	57.265
9	Isabela Onyshko (CAN)	14.000	14.733	14.533	13.966	57.232
10	Elisabeth Seitz (GER)	14.100	15.466	13.866	13.666	57.098
11	Asuka Teramoto (JPN)	14.800	14.900	13.666	13.700	57.066
12	Elsabeth Black (CAN)	14.766	14.500	13.566	14.133	56.965
13	Jessica López (VEN)	14.933	15.333	13.933	12.733	56.932
14	Giulia Steingruber (SUI)	15.600	13.900	12.733	14.666	56.899
15	Lieke Wevers (NED)	13.966	14.600	14.366	13.850	56.782
16	Marine Brevet (FRA)	14.133	14.333	14.166	13.933	56.565
17	Flávia Saraiva (BRA)	14.633	12.733	15.133	14.033	56.532
18	Shang Chunsong (CHN)	12.766	15.300	14.366	14.100	56.532
19	Nina Derwael (BEL)	13.900	15.133	13.966	13.533	56.532
20	Ellie Downie (GBR)	14.833	14.633	14.500	12.500	56.466
21	Louise Vanhille (FRA)	13.966	14.866	13.633	13.300	55.765
22	Carlotta Ferlito (ITA)	14.300	14.033	13.233	14.033	55.599
23	Sophie Scheder (GER)	13.966	15.433	12.933	13.266	55.598
24	Vanessa Ferrari (ITA)	14.533	13.866	12.000	14.866	55.265

==== Reserves ====
The reserves for the individual all-around event final are

- Claudia Fragapane (GBR)
- Alexa Moreno (MEX)
- Ana Sofía Gómez (GUA)
- Zsófia Kovács (HUN)

Only two gymnasts from each country may advance to the all-around final. Therefore, in some cases, a third gymnast placed high enough to qualify, but did not advance to the final because of the quota. Gymnasts who did not advance to the final, but had high enough scores to do so were:

- Gabby Douglas (USA) (3rd place)
- Aiko Sugihara (JPN) (16th place)
- Angelina Melnikova (RUS) (22nd place)
- Jade Barbosa (BRA) (23rd place)

=== Vault ===
Rank	Gymnast	Vault 1				Vault 2				Total
Rank	Gymnast	D Score	E Score	Pen.	Score 1	D Score	E Score	Pen.	Score 2	Total
1	Simone Biles (USA)	6.300	9.700		16.000	6.400	9.700		16.100	16.050
2	Hong Un-jong (PRK)	6.300	9.466		15.766	6.400	9.200		15.600	15.683
3	Giulia Steingruber (SUI)	6.200	9.400		15.600	5.800	9.133		14.933	15.266
4	Maria Paseka (RUS)	6.400	8.633	-0.300	14.733	6.300	9.066		15.366	15.049
5	Oksana Chusovitina (UZB)	6.200	8.966		15.166	6.000	8.833		14.833	14.999
6	Shallon Olsen (CAN)	6.300	9.000		15.300	5.900	8.700		14.600	14.950
7	Wang Yan (CHN)	6.000	8.933		14.933	6.200	8.866	-0.100	14.966	14.949
8	Dipa Karmakar (IND)	7.000	8.100		15.100	6.000	8.600		14.600	14.850

=== Uneven bars ===
Rank	Gymnast	Difficulty	Execution	Penalty	Total
1	Madison Kocian (USA)	6.700	9.166		15.866
2	Aliya Mustafina (RUS)	6.800	9.033		15.833
3	Gabby Douglas (USA)	6.500	9.266		15.766
4	Daria Spiridonova (RUS)	6.700	8.983		15.683
5	Elisabeth Seitz (GER)	6.600	8.866		15.466
6	Sophie Scheder (GER)	6.600	8.833		15.433
7	Jessica López (VEN)	6.400	8.933		15.333
8	Shang Chunsong (CHN)	6.700	8.600		15.300

=== Balance beam ===
Rank	Gymnast	Difficulty	Execution	Penalty	Total
1	Simone Biles (USA)	6.700	8.933		15.633
2	Laurie Hernandez (USA)	6.400	8.966		15.366
3	Flávia Saraiva (BRA)	6.300	8.833		15.133
4	Sanne Wevers (NED)	6.300	8.766		15.066
5	Cătălina Ponor (ROU)	6.200	8.700		14.900
6	Fan Yilin (CHN)	6.400	8.466		14.866
7	Marine Boyer (FRA)	6.200	8.400		14.600
8	Isabela Onyshko (CAN)	6.500	8.033		14.533

Only two gymnasts from each country may advance to the balance beam final. Therefore, in some cases, a third and/or fourth placed high enough to qualify, but did not advance to the final because of the quota. Gymnasts who did not advance to the final, but had high enough scores to do so were:

- Gabby Douglas (USA) (T-7th place)
- Aly Raisman (USA) (T-7th place)

=== Floor exercise ===
Rank	Gymnast	Difficulty	Execution	Penalty	Total
1	Simone Biles (USA)	6.800	8.933		15.733
2	Aly Raisman (USA)	6.600	8.675		15.275
3	Vanessa Ferrari (ITA)	6.200	8.666		14.866
4	Giulia Steingruber (SUI)	6.200	8.466		14.666
5	Wang Yan (CHN)	6.300	8.366		14.666
6	Amy Tinkler (GBR)	6.300	8.300		14.600
7	Mai Murakami (JPN)	6.200	8.366		14.566
8	Erika Fasana (ITA)	6.100	8.233		14.333

Only two gymnasts from each country may advance to the floor exercise final. Therefore, in some cases, a third and/or fourth gymnast placed high enough to qualify, but did not advance to the final because of the quota. Gymnasts who did not advance to the final, but had high enough scores to do so were:

- Laurie Hernandez (USA) (4th place)
