= Ece Ayan =

Swedish artistic gymnast

- Born: 20 February 1998 (age 28) Leksand, Sweden

Gymnastics career
- Discipline: Women's artistic gymnastics
- Country represented: Sweden
- Club: Eskilstuna
Medal record
Representing Sweden
Northern European Gymnastics Championships
Silver medal – second place	2012 Glasgow	Team

Ece Ayan (born 20 February 1998) is a Swedish artistic gymnast.

== Gymnastics career ==
Ayan competed at the 2012 Northern European Championships alongside Emma Larsson, Lovisa Estberg, and Ida Gustafsson, and the team won the silver medal behind Wales. She competed at the 2012 Junior European Championships and helped the Swedish team finish 9th. At the 2013 Nordic Junior Championships, she finished 4th in the all-around. She competed at the 2013 European Youth Summer Olympic Festival alongside Emma Larsson and Kim Singmuang, and they finished 6th as a team.

At the 2015 Belgium-Sweden-Austria Friendly, the Swedish team finished 2nd, and Ayan finished 7th in the all-around. She then competed at the 2015 World Championships with Kim Singmuang, Stina Lovisa Estberg, Emma Larsson, Veronica Wagner, and Marcela Torres, and the team finished 22nd. She won the gold medal in the all-around at the 2016 Nordic Championships. At the 2016 Swedish Championships, she won the gold medal on the uneven bars and the silver medal in the all-around behind Marcela Torres. She won the bronze medal on the balance beam at the 2018 Swedish Championships.
