= 2011 Northern European Gymnastics Championships =

International gymnastics competition

- Location: Uppsala, Sweden
- Start date: 11 November 2011
- End date: 13 November 2011

The 2011 Northern European Gymnastics Championships was an artistic gymnastics competition held in the city of Uppsala. The event was held between 11 and 13 November.

== Medalists ==
Event	Gold	Silver	Bronze
Men
Team all-around	Wales; Clinton Purnell; Grant Gardiner; Harry Owen; Matt Hennessey; Robert Sansby	Finland; Heikki Niva; Kasper Holopainen; Juho Kanerva; Henrik Pettersson; Jimi Päivänen	Sweden; Pontus Kallanvaara; Christopher Soos; Oskar Kirmes; Måns Stenberg; Toni Simonen
Individual all-around	Clinton Purnell (WAL)	Stian Skjerahaug (NOR)	Toni Simonen (SWE)
Floor	Kristoffer Alvern Andersen (NOR) Måns Stenberg (SWE)	None Awarded	Anthony O'Donnell (IRL) Måns Stenberg (SWE)
Pommel horse	Heikki Niva (FIN) Juho Kanerva (FIN)	None Awarded	Róbert Kristmannsson (ISL)
Rings	Måns Stenberg (SWE)	Clinton Purnell (WAL)	Stian Skjerahaug (NOR)
Vault	Clinton Purnell (WAL)	Kasper Holopainen (FIN)	Toni Simonen (SWE)
Parallel bars	Heikki Niva (FIN)	Stian Skjerahaug (NOR)	Toni Simonen (SWE)
Horizontal bar	Heikki Niva (FIN)	Stian Skjerahaug (NOR)	Clinton Purnell (WAL)
Women
Team all-around	Sweden; Jonna Adlerteg; Lovisa Estberg; Ida Gustafsson; Ida Rothe; Kim Singmuang	Wales; Elizabeth Beddoe; Keira Brennan; Georgina Hockenhull; Jessica Hogg; Hollie Moore	Iceland; Dominiqua Belányi; Thelma Hermannsdottir; Freya Josephsdottir; Hildur Olafsdottir; Agnus Suto
Individual all-around	Ida Gustafsson (SWE)	Kim Singmuang (SWE)	Elizabeth Beddoe (WAL)
Vault	Kim Singmuang (SWE)	Jessica Hogg (WAL)	Mia Furu (DEN)
Uneven bars	Jonna Adlerteg (SWE)	Ida Gustafsson (SWE)	Keira Brennan (WAL)
Balance beam	Kiera Brennan (WAL)	Tina Larsen (NOR)	Jonna Adlerteg (SWE) Cara Kennedy (SCO)
Floor	Elizabeth Beddoe (WAL)	Holly Ramage (SCO)	Hildur Olafsdottir (ISL)
