= Stina Lovisa Estberg =

Swedish artistic gymnast

- Born: 13 August 1998 (age 28) Fors, Sweden

Gymnastics career
- Discipline: Women's artistic gymnastics
- Country represented: Sweden
- Club: Eskilstuna GF
- Head coaches: Helena Andersson, Sebastian Melander

Stina Lovisa Estberg (born 13 August 1998) is a Swedish artistic gymnast.

== Gymnastics career ==
Estberg competed at the 2012 Junior European Championships and helped the Swedish team finish 9th.

At the 2014 Cottbus World Cup, Estberg competed on the balance beam and the floor exercise, but she did not qualify for the event finals. She competed at the 2014 European Championships with Emma Larsson, Jonna Adlerteg, Kim Singmuang, and Nicole Vanstroem, and the team finished 12th. The same team plus Veronica Wagner competed at the 2014 World Championships, and the team finished 21st.

Estberg won the silver medal in the all-around behind Marcela Torres at the 2015 Swedish Championships. At the Anadia World Cup, she finished 6th on the balance beam and the floor exercise. At the 2015 Belgium-Sweden-Austria Friendly, the Swedish team finished 2nd. She then competed at the 2015 World Championships with Ece Ayan, Marcela Torres, Emma Larsson, Veronica Wagner, and Kim Singmuang, and the team finished 22nd.

Estberg won the gold medal on the floor exercise at the 2016 Nordic Championships. Then at the 2016 Swedish Championships, she won the bronze medal in the all-around.
