= Angel Romaeo =

Welsh artistic gymnast (born 1997)

- Born: 14 August 1997 (age 29) Bristol, England
- Height: 1.40 m (4 ft 7 in)

Gymnastics career
- Discipline: Women's artistic gymnastics
- Country represented: (United Kingdom) Great Britain; Wales
- Head coach: Tracey Skirton
Medal record
Representing Wales
Commonwealth Games
| Bronze medal – third place | 2014 Glasgow | Team |
Northern European Championships
| Gold medal – first place | 2012 Glasgow | Team |
| Gold medal – first place | 2014 Greve | Team |
| Gold medal – first place | 2014 Greve | Floor exercise |
| Silver medal – second place | 2012 Glasgow | All-around |
| Silver medal – second place | 2012 Glasgow | Uneven bars |
| Silver medal – second place | 2012 Glasgow | Floor exercise |
Commonwealth Youth Games
| Gold medal – first place | 2011 Isle of Man | All-around |
| Silver medal – second place | 2011 Isle of Man | Team |
| Bronze medal – third place | 2011 Isle of Man | Uneven bars |

Angel Romaeo (born 14 August 1997) is a Welsh former artistic gymnast. She competed for Wales at the 2014 Commonwealth Games and was a member of the team that won the bronze medal. She is a two-time Northern European Championships team champion and the 2011 Commonwealth Youth Games all-around champion.

== Early life ==
Romaeo grew up in Cardiff with five siblings. Her brothers were boxers, and her sister also trained in gymnastics.

== Gymnastics career ==
Romaeo won the all-around title at the 2011 Commonwealth Youth Games. She also won a silver medal with the Welsh team and won a bronze medal on the uneven bars. At the end of the year, she received the BBC Wales Carwyn James Junior Sportswoman of the Year award. She was selected to compete for Great Britain at the 2012 Junior European Championships. The British team finished fourth, and Romaeo placed 15th in the all-around final. She won a gold medal with the Welsh team at the 2012 Northern European Championships and also won the all-around, uneven bars, and floor exercise silver medals.

Romaeo became age-eligible for senior competitions in 2013. At the 2013 British Championships, she finished 12th in the all-around and fifth in the floor exercise final. She made her senior international debut at the 2013 Austrian Team Open, helping Great Britain win the team competition and placing fourth in the all-around.

Romaeo was selected to represent Wales at the 2014 Commonwealth Games and was the youngest member of the gymnastics team. She helped Wales win its first-ever Commonwealth Games team medal in artistic gymnastics. At the 2014 Northern European Championships, she won gold medals with the Welsh team and on the floor exercise.

Romaeo finished tenth in the all-around at the 2015 WOGA Classic. At the 2015 British Championships, she tied with Kelly Simm for fourth place in the all-around. She also tied with Simm for fourth place in the floor exercise final, and she finished seventh on the balance beam. She competed with the British team that placed fifth at the 2015 FIT Challenge. This was the final competition of her career.
