= Georgina Hockenhull =

British artistic gymnast (born 1997)

- Born: 4 June 1997 (age 29) Shrewsbury, United Kingdom
- Height: 150 cm (4 ft 11 in)

Gymnastics career
- Discipline: Women's artistic gymnastics
- Country represented: Great Britain; Wales
- Club: Park Wrekin Gymnastics Club
- Head coach: Brett Ince
- Assistant coach: Christine Still
- Retired: 2018
Medal record
Representing Wales
Commonwealth Games
Bronze medal – third place	2014 Glasgow	Team
Bronze medal – third place	2014 Glasgow	Balance Beam
Northern European Championships
Gold medal – first place	2012 Glasgow	Team
Gold medal – first place	2013 Lisburn	Team
Gold medal – first place	2013 Lisburn	All-Around
Silver medal – second place	2011 Uppsala	Team
Silver medal – second place	2012 Glasgow	Balance Beam

Georgina Hockenhull (born 4 June 1997) is a British artistic gymnast. She represented Wales at the 2014 Commonwealth Games in Glasgow where she won two historic medals for Welsh women's artistic gymnastics. Hockenhull will also compete for Great Britain at the first ever European Games.
