= Gymnastics at the 2013 European Youth Summer Olympic Festival =

- Location: (Netherlands) Utrecht
- Dates: 16–19 July 2013

The gymnastics competition at the 2013 European Youth Summer Olympic Festival was held from 16 to 19 July 2013 in Utrecht, Netherlands. At most three boys born 1996/1997 and girls born 1998/1999 or later from each country participated.

== Medal summary ==
=== Medal table ===
==== Overall ====
Rank	Nation	Gold	Silver	Bronze	Total
1	Russia	7	3	3	13
2	Great Britain	5	4	2	11
3	Italy	2	0	2	4
4	France	0	2	1	3
5	Germany	0	2	0	2
6	Romania	0	1	3	4
7	Greece	0	1	0	1
7	Netherlands	0	1	0	1
9	Belarus	0	0	1	1
9	Croatia	0	0	1	1
9	Lithuania	0	0	1	1
9	Turkey	0	0	1	1
Totals (12 entries)		14	14	15	43

==== Boys ====
Rank	Nation	Gold	Silver	Bronze	Total
1	Great Britain (GBR)	4	3	0	7
2	Russia (RUS)	3	3	3	9
3	Italy (ITA)	1	0	1	2
4	France (FRA)	0	1	0	1
4	Greece (GRE)	0	1	0	1
6	Belarus (BLR)	0	0	1	1
6	Croatia (CRO)	0	0	1	1
6	Lithuania (LTU)	0	0	1	1
6	Turkey (TUR)	0	0	1	1
Totals (9 entries)		8	8	8	24

==== Girls ====
Rank	Nation	Gold	Silver	Bronze	Total
1	Russia (RUS)	4	0	0	4
2	Great Britain (GBR)	1	1	2	4
3	Italy (ITA)	1	0	1	2
4	Germany (GER)	0	2	0	2
5	Romania (ROU)	0	1	3	4
6	France (FRA)	0	1	1	2
7	Netherlands (NED)	0	1	0	1
Totals (7 entries)		6	6	7	19

=== Medal winners ===
Event	Gold	Silver	Bronze
Boys
Team	Great Britain	Russia	Italy
All-Around	Brinn Bevan (GBR)	Nile Wilson (GBR)	Ivan Stretovich (RUS)
Floor Exercise	Valentin Starikov (RUS)	Brinn Bevan (GBR)	Tomas Kuzmickas (LTU)
Pommel Horse	Nile Wilson (GBR)	Antonios Tantalidis (GRE)	Valentin Starikov (RUS)
Still Rings	Nile Wilson (GBR)	Paul Degouy (FRA)	Ivan Stretovich (RUS)
Vault	Kirill Popatov (RUS)	Valentin Starikov (RUS)	Viktar Hrankouski (BLR)
Parallel Bars	Ivan Stretovich (RUS)	Brinn Bevan (GBR)	Ahmet Onder (TUR)
Horizontal Bar	Carlo Macchini (ITA)	Valentin Starikov (RUS)	Tin Srbić (CRO)
Girls
Team	Russia	Great Britain	Romania
All-Around	Maria Kharenkova (RUS)	Kim Janas (GER)	Tyesha Mattis (GBR)
Vault	Ellie Downie (GBR)	Laura Jurca (ROU)	Tyesha Mattis (GBR)
Uneven Bars	Martina Rizzelli (ITA)	Louise Vanhille (FRA)	Tea Ugrin (ITA)
Balance Beam	Maria Bondareva (RUS)	Eythora Thorsdottir (NED)	Claire Martin (FRA); Andreea Iridon (ROU)
Floor Exercise	Maria Kharenkova (RUS)	Kim Janas (GER)	Silvia Zarzu (ROU)

== Girls' Results ==
=== Team Final ===
Rank	Team	Vault (gymnastics)	Uneven bars	Balance beam	Floor (gymnastics)	Total
1st place, gold medalist(s)	Russia	27.800	25.550	29.900	27.050	110.300
1st place, gold medalist(s)	Maria Bondareva	13.850	11.950	14.850	13.200	110.300
1st place, gold medalist(s)	Maria Kharenkova	13.950	11.750	15.050	13.850	110.300
1st place, gold medalist(s)	Viktoria Kuzmina	0.000	13.600	13.900	0.000	110.300
2nd place, silver medalist(s)	Great Britain	29.550	26.500	27.600	26.100	109.750
2nd place, silver medalist(s)	Tyesha Mattis	14.750	13.400	13.850	12.700	109.750
2nd place, silver medalist(s)	Ellie Downie	14.800	13.100	13.750	12.650	109.750
2nd place, silver medalist(s)	Amy Tinkler	14.600	11.550	12.900	13.400	109.750
3rd place, bronze medalist(s)	Romania	27.700	25.350	28.600	27.150	108.800
3rd place, bronze medalist(s)	Laura Jurca	14.500	12.500	14.050	13.350	108.800
3rd place, bronze medalist(s)	Andreea Iridon	0.000	12.850	14.550	13.550	108.800
3rd place, bronze medalist(s)	Silvia Zarzu	13.200	0.000	0.000	13.600	108.800
4	France	26.900	26.550	27.850	26.050	107.350
4	Louise Vanhille	13.800	13.600	13.900	12.900	107.350
4	Claire Martin	13.100	12.950	13.950	13.150	107.350
4	Laura Longueville	13.050	11.650	13.300	12.500	107.350
5	Italy	27.650	26.550	26.300	26.300	106.800
5	Martina Rizzelli	13.900	13.250	12.650	13.100	106.800
5	Tea Ugrin	13.750	13.300	12.700	13.200	106.800
5	Lara Mori	13.700	12.750	13.600	12.900	106.800
6	Sweden	28.000	26.150	25.600	25.750	105.500
6	Kim Singmuang	13.850	13.050	12.950	12.450	105.500
6	Emma Larsson	14.150	13.100	12.650	13.300	105.500
6	Ece Ayan	13.050	11.600	12.150	11.850	105.500
6	Germany	27.400	23.800	27.950	26.350	105.500
6	Leah Grießer	13.000	11.950	13.500	12.650	105.500
6	Kim Janas	14.000	11.300	14.450	13.700	105.500
6	Nadja Schulze	13.400	11.850	12.150	12.350	105.500
8	Belgium	27.400	25.700	26.300	25.200	104.600
8	Bérengère Fransolet	13.900	12.900	13.300	11.550	104.600
8	Rune Hermans	13.050	11.900	13.000	12.700	104.600
8	Cindy Vandenhole	13.500	12.800	12.400	12.500	104.600
9	Netherlands	25.900	24.100	26.850	26.400	103.250
9	Dana de Groot	13.400	10.750	12.700	12.900	103.250
9	Eythora Thorsdottir	12.500	12.650	14.150	13.050	103.250
9	Mara Titarsolej	0.000	11.450	0.000	13.350	103.250
10	Spain	27.300	22.650	25.300	24.650	99.900
10	Claudia Colom	13.550	9.900	12.750	13.300	99.900
10	Natalia Ros	13.100	12.000	11.850	12.350	99.900
10	Laura Gamell	13.750	10.650	12.550	12.100	99.900
11	Belarus	26.050	23.600	25.450	24.500	99.600
11	Aliaksandra Koshaleva	12.300	10.500	12.500	12.050	99.600
11	Yulia Khramiankova	12.600	8.600	12.200	12.150	99.600
11	Dayana Hryhoryeva	13.450	13.100	12.950	12.350	99.600
12	Turkey	27.300	22.150	24.300	25.350	99.100
12	Ekin Morova	12.050	9.250	10.700	11.550	99.100
12	Cansu Altın	13.500	11.550	10.550	12.300	99.100
12	Tutya Yılmaz	13.800	10.600	13.600	13.050	99.100
13	Ukraine	27.700	22.100	24.300	24.250	98.350
13	Yana Fedorova	14.050	11.600	12.650	12.000	98.350
13	Anastasiya Ilnytska	13.650	9.900	11.650	12.100	98.350
13	Iryna Sahaydak	13.650	10.500	11.650	12.150	98.350
14	Switzerland	25.750	21.400	24.550	24.250	95.950
14	Michelle Kraus	12.600	10.000	12.450	11.350	95.950
14	Gaia Nesurini	12.300	8.800	11.900	12.100	95.950
14	Stefanie Siegenthaler	13.150	11.400	12.100	12.150	95.950
15	Greece	26.050	23.600	25.450	24.500	94.800
15	Zoi Toka	12.150	9.300	10.850	11.350	94.800
15	Argyro Afrati	13.700	12.150	12.300	13.000	94.800

=== All-Around Final ===
Rank	Gymnast	Vault (gymnastics)	Uneven bars	Balance beam	Floor (gymnastics)	Total
1st place, gold medalist(s)	Maria Kharenkova (RUS)	13.850	13.150	14.000	13.950	54.950
2nd place, silver medalist(s)	Kim Janas (GER)	13.950	13.650	13.950	13.400	54.950
3rd place, bronze medalist(s)	Tyesha Mattis (GBR)	14.650	13.450	13.600	13.150	54.850
4	Ellie Downie (GBR)	14.650	12.800	13.900	13.350	54.700
5	Maria Bondareva (RUS)	13.550	13.700	14.400	12.550	54.200
6	Louise Vanhille (FRA)	13.950	13.750	12.700	13.400	53.800
7	Laura Jurca (ROU)	14.450	12.050	13.750	13.250	53.500
8	Emma Larsson (SWE)	14.050	12.350	13.700	13.300	53.400
9	Eythora Thorsdottir (NED)	13.800	13.150	12.850	13.150	52.950
10	Tea Ugrin (ITA)	13.650	13.350	13.400	12.350	52.750
11	Leah Grießer (GER)	13.100	12.950	13.250	13.150	52.450
12	Kim Singmuang (SWE)	13.700	13.050	13.200	12.200	52.150
13	Lara Mori (ITA)	13.650	12.950	12.250	12.950	51.800
14	Argyro Afrati (GRE)	13.550	12.500	12.800	12.850	51.700
15	Claire Martin (FRA)	12.350	12.950	13.050	13.200	51.550
16	Dana de Groot (NED)	13.350	11.700	12.350	13.200	50.600
17	Cindy Vandenhole (BEL)	13.900	12.450	12.050	12.100	50.500
18	Dayana Hryhoryeva (BLR)	13.250	12.700	11.800	12.500	50.250
19	Yana Fedorova (UKR)	13.500	11.500	13.250	11.900	50.150
20	Rune Hermans (BEL)	12.850	11.400	12.650	13.000	49.900
21	Stefanie Siegenthaler (SUI)	13.100	11.800	12.300	11.900	49.100
22	Laura Gamell (ESP)	13.350	11.300	10.600	12.300	47.550
23	Natalia Ros (ESP)	13.300	9.150	12.750	12.300	47.500
24	Tutya Yılmaz (TUR)	13.650	9.050	13.200	11.400	47.300

=== Vault Final ===
Rank	Gymnast	D Score	E Score	Pen.	Score 1	D Score	E Score	Pen.	Score 2	Total
1st place, gold medalist(s)	Ellie Downie (GBR)	5.8	9.100		14.900	5.0	9.050		14.050	14.475
2nd place, silver medalist(s)	Laura Jurca (ROU)	5.0	8.950		13.950	5.8	9.000		14.800	14.375
3rd place, bronze medalist(s)	Tyesha Mattis (GBR)	5.8	8.750		14.550	5.0	9.050		14.050	14.300
4	Kim Janas (GER)	5.0	8.950		13.950	4.6	9.250		13.850	13.900
5	Emma Larsson (SWE)	5.3	8.850	0.1	14.050	5.2	8.600	0.1	13.700	13.875
6	Ana Đerek (CRO)	5.2	8.800		14.000	4.8	8.900		13.700	13.850
7	Yana Fedorova (UKR)	5.0	8.700		13.700	4.4	9.000		13.400	13.550
8	Martina Rizzelli (ITA)	5.8	7.400	0.3	12.900	5.3	8.600		13.900	13.400
Rank	Gymnast	Vault 1				Vault 2				Total

=== Uneven Bars Final ===
Rank	Gymnast	D Score	E Score	Pen.	Total
1st place, gold medalist(s)	Martina Rizzelli (ITA)	5.8	8.350		14.150
2nd place, silver medalist(s)	Louise Vanhille (FRA)	5.8	8.150		13.950
3rd place, bronze medalist(s)	Tea Ugrin (ITA)	5.8	7.900		13.700
4	Viktoria Kuzmina (RUS)	5.8	7.800		13.600
5	Tyesha Mattis (GBR)	5.7	7.800		13.500
6	Dayana Hryhoryeva (BLR)	5.2	7.900		13.100
7	Ellie Downie (GBR)	5.2	7.100		12.300
8	Emma Larsson (SWE)	4.7	6.700		11.400

=== Balance Beam Final ===
Rank	Gymnast	D Score	E Score	Pen.	Total
1st place, gold medalist(s)	Maria Bondareva (RUS)	5.5	8.750		14.250
2nd place, silver medalist(s)	Eythora Thorsdottir (NED)	5.6	8.200		13.800
3rd place, bronze medalist(s)	Claire Martin (FRA)	5.8	7.950		13.750
3rd place, bronze medalist(s)	Andreea Iridon (ROU)	5.8	7.950		13.750
5	Kim Janas (GER)	5.8	7.700		13.500
6	Laura Jurca (ROU)	5.7	7.800	0.1	13.400
7	Maria Kharenkova (RUS)	6.4	6.700		13.100
8	Louise Vanhille (FRA)	5.3	7.300		12.600

=== Floor Exercise Final ===
Rank	Gymnast	D Score	E Score	Pen.	Total
1st place, gold medalist(s)	Maria Kharenkova (RUS)	5.5	8.450		13.950
2nd place, silver medalist(s)	Kim Janas (GER)	5.4	8.350		13.750
3rd place, bronze medalist(s)	Silvia Zarzu (ROU)	5.6	8.150		13.750
4	Andreea Iridon (ROU)	5.3	8.350		13.650
5	Emma Larsson (SWE)	5.3	8.000		13.300
6	Amy Tinkler (GBR)	5.4	8.150	0.3	13.250
7	Tea Ugrin (ITA)	5.3	8.200	0.3	13.200
8	Mara Titarsolej (NED)	5.4	7.800		13.200
