= Tom Barnes (gymnast) =

British artistic gymnast (born 1990)

- Born: 14 November 1990 (age 35)

Gymnastics career
- Discipline: Men's artistic gymnastics
- Country represented: Scotland
Medal record
Representing Scotland
Northern European Gymnastics Championships
Silver medal – second place	2013 Lisburn	Team
Bronze medal – third place	2014 Greve	Floor

Tom Barnes (born 14 November 1990) is a British artistic gymnast who represents his nation at international competitions. In 2012 he became the Scottish All Around Champion. He competed at the 2014 Northern European Gymnastics Championships in Denmark, Greve and won a Bronze medal on the floor exercise. He is training at Tolworth Gymnastics Club (United Kingdom), after coming out of retirement. Barnes is currently the men's head coach at Heathrow Gymnastics Club (United Kingdom). He has been coaching the Heathrow Men's Squad for three years and was the coach of the team who took the bronze medal at the 2015 men's artistic under 14 British Team Championships.
