= Ellis O'Reilly =

British-Irish artistic gymnast (born 1998)

- Full name: Ellis Jacqueline O'Reilly
- Born: 23 February 1998 (age 28) Kent, United Kingdom
- Height: 5 ft 5 in (165 cm)

Gymnastics career
- Discipline: Women's artistic gymnastics
- Country represented: Ireland (2014–2017)
- Former countries represented: Great Britain; Northern Ireland
- Club: Europa Gymnastics; Renmore Gymnastics Club
- Head coach: Sam James

Ellis Jacqueline O'Reilly (born 23 February 1998) is a retired English-born female artistic gymnast, who represented Ireland at international competitions, most notably at the 2016 Olympic Games. She has competed at world championships, including the 2014 World Artistic Gymnastics Championships in Nanning, China. She was a three time silver medalist at the Northern European Championships. In 2017, O'Reilly announced her retirement from the sport, at the age of nineteen.

== Career ==
Ellis trained in the Europa Gymnastics club, in Crayford, under coach Sam James. While competing in Ireland she represented Renmore Gymnastics Club in Renmore, County Galway. Ellis has a number of national titles to her name and was the 2014 & 2015 All Around Irish Champion. She made her International senior debut in Sofia, Bulgaria in 2014 at the European Championships. Since then Ellis has attended two World Championships (China in 2014 and in Glasgow in 2015). Another European Championships in Monpellier in 2015 and she competed at the inaugural Baku Games in 2015. At the Northern Europeans in Limerick in 2015, O’Reilly claimed a number of silver medals including Individual All Around and with the Irish Team.

== Olympic Games 2016 ==
At the World Championships in Glasgow in October 2015, Ellis secured Ireland their first ever place for an Irish female gymnast at an Olympic test event. In March 2016, she was selected as the gymnast to take that place and go forward to compete for a place at the Rio Olympics 2016. O'Reilly became the first Irish female gymnast to ever secure Olympic qualification at the Aquecce Rio Test Event, the final qualifying event for the Rio de Janeiro games.

== Retirement ==
O'Reilly retired from gymnastics in 2017. In 2020, she revealed that due to health problems, including dislocated knees, broken wrists, disc herniation and a broken neck, she had been forced to quit the sport or face the prospect of life in a wheelchair.

== Personal life ==
Ellis took up the sport of gymnastics at age six. She qualifies for Ireland through her County Armagh-born grandfather. O'Reilly previously represented both Great Britain and Northern Ireland.

Her older sister Jenna is a four-time amateur British boxing champion, who was given the honour of leading Katie Taylor into the ring for her gold medal fight in London 2012. O'Reilly also has two younger brothers, Frank and Reggie, who are boxers.

== See also ==
- Nationality changes in gymnastics
