= Jonna Adlerteg =

Swedish gymnast

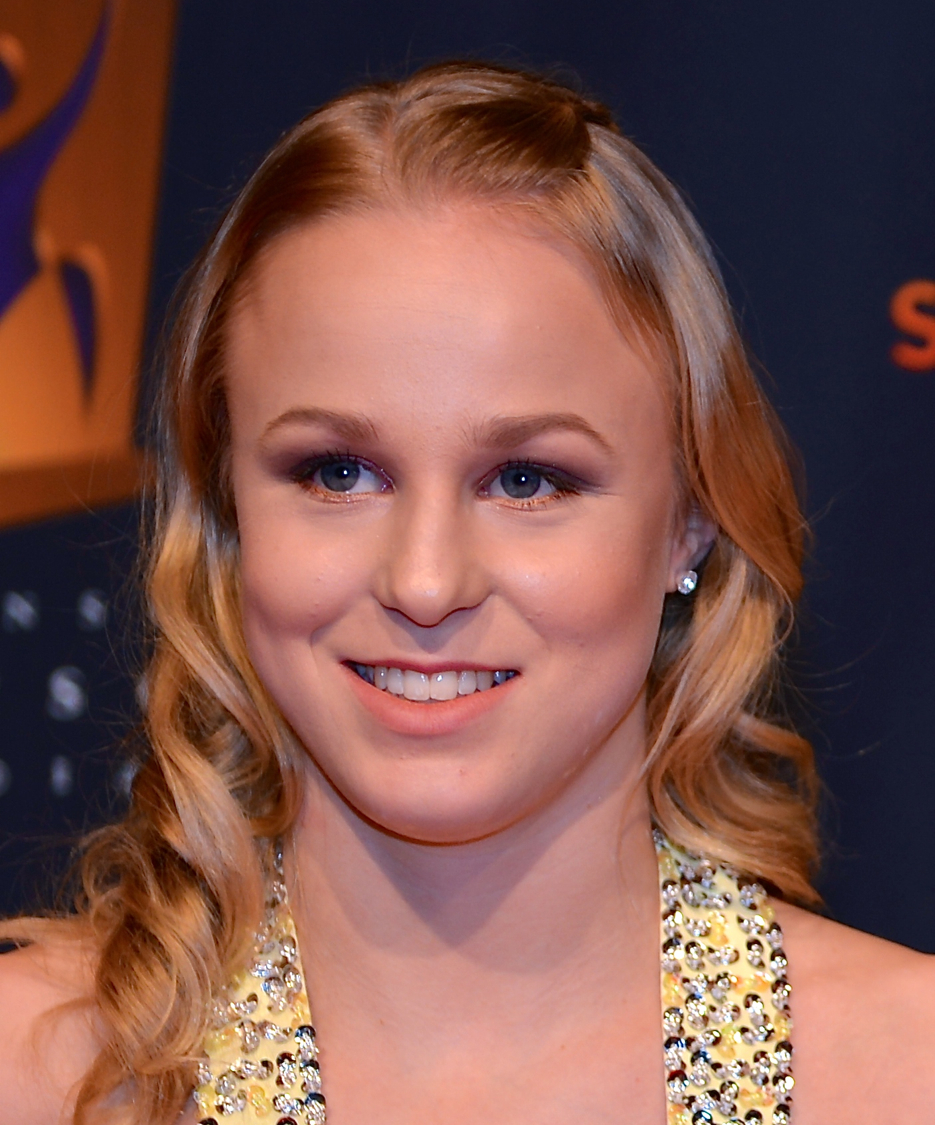
- Adlerteg at the 2014 Swedish Sports Gala

Personal information
- Full name: Jonna Eva-Maj Adlerteg
- Born: 6 June 1995 (age 31) Västerås, Sweden

Gymnastics career
- Discipline: Women's artistic gymnastics
- Club: Eskilstuna Gymnastics Club
- Head coaches: Sebastian Melander and Helena Andersson
- Retired: 28 April 2022
Medal record
Representing Sweden
European Championships
Silver medal – second place	2013 Moscow	Uneven bars
Silver medal – second place	2018 Glasgow	Uneven bars
Youth Olympic Games
Bronze medal – third place	2010 Singapore	Uneven bars
Northern European Championships
Gold medal – first place	2011 Uppsala	Team
Gold medal – first place	2011 Uppsala	Uneven bars
Bronze medal – third place	2011 Uppsala	Balance beam
Nordic Championships
Gold medal – first place	2018 Farum	Uneven bars
Silver medal – second place	2018 Farum	Team
FIG World Cup
Event / 1st / 2nd / 3rd; World Challenge Cup / 4 / 2 / 0

Jonna Eva-Maj Adlerteg (born 6 June 1995) is a Swedish retired artistic gymnast and a two-time European Championships silver medalist. She began gymnastics at age three with her mother being her first coach. During her junior career, she won the bronze medal on the uneven bars at the 2010 Summer Youth Olympics. In her first year as a senior gymnast, she won three medals at the 2011 Northern European Championships. She qualified for the 2012 Summer Olympics and became the third Swedish female gymnast to compete at the Olympic Games. When she won the silver medal on the uneven bars at the 2013 European Championships, she became Sweden's first European medalist in women's gymnastics in over 50 years.

Adlerteg missed the 2016 Summer Olympics due to a knee injury. She then returned to competition and won a gold medal on the uneven bars at the 2018 Nordic Championships and a silver medal at the 2018 European Championships. At the 2018 World Championships, she became the first Swedish female gymnast to qualify for an event final at the World Artistic Gymnastics Championships since 1958, finishing eighth on the uneven bars. She was the second reserve for the uneven bars final at the 2020 Summer Olympics, the final competition of her career before announcing her retirement in 2022.

== Early life ==
Adlerteg was born on 6 June 1995 in Västerås. She began gymnastics when she was three years old, with her mother being her first coach. When she began high school, she moved to Eskilstuna to switch coaches because she was frequently fighting with her mother as a coach.

== Career ==
=== 2010–2011 ===
Adlerteg competed at the Junior European Championships and finished eleventh in the all-around and fourth on the uneven bars. She then represented Sweden at the 2010 Summer Youth Olympics. She finished tenth in the all-around final. She also finished eighth on balance beam and seventh on floor exercise. On the uneven bars, she won the bronze medal, behind Viktoria Komova and Tan Sixin.

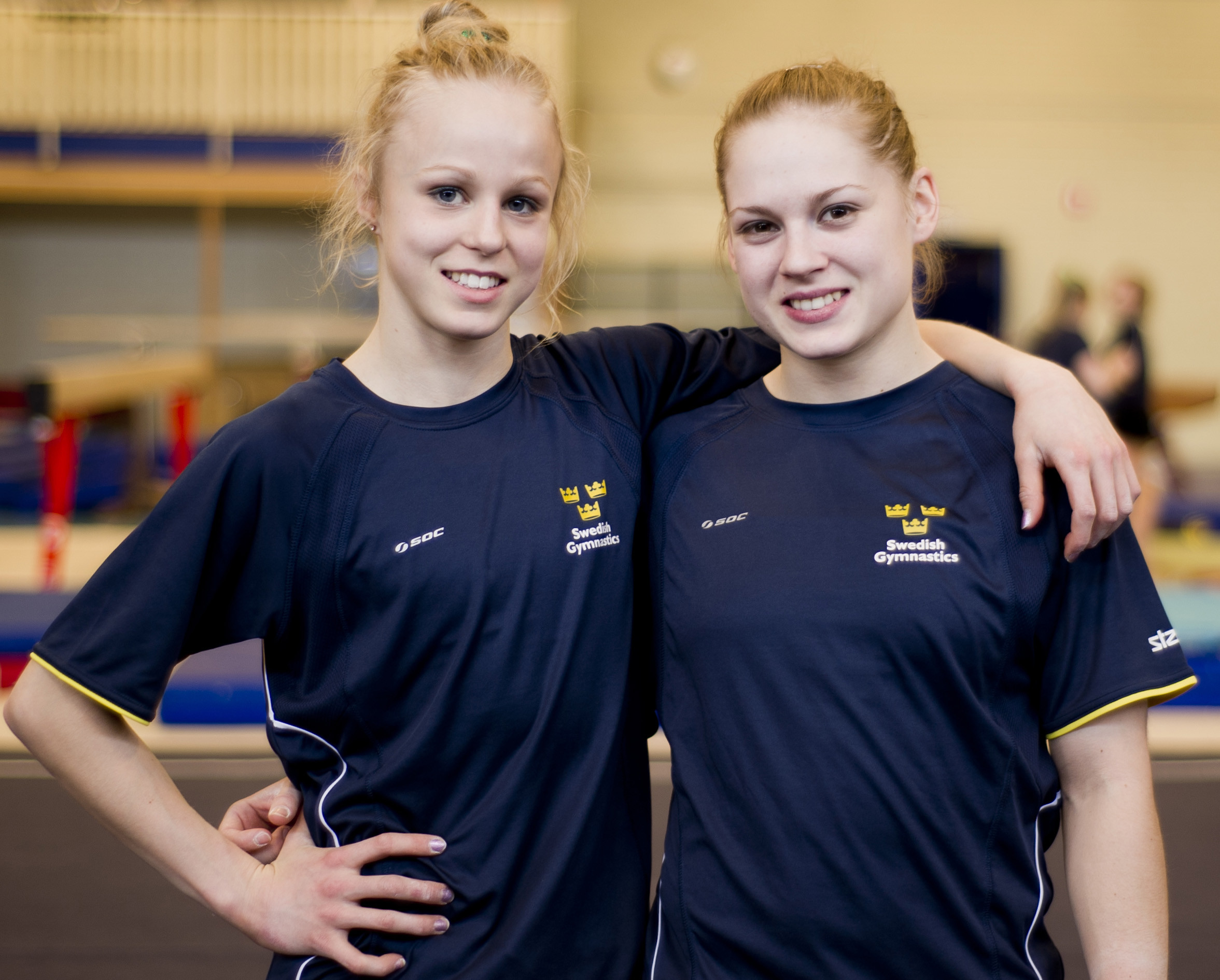
Adlerteg (left) with Veronica Wagner at the 2011 European Championships

Adlerteg made her senior international debut at the 2011 Cottbus World Cup, but she did not advance into any event finals. She competed at the 2011 European Championships in Berlin. She qualified for the all-around final in 16th place alongside Veronica Wagner, marking the first time two Swedish female gymnasts qualified for the all-around final at a European Championships. Adlerteg finished 23rd in the final with a total score of 49.500. She then won the silver medal in the all-around at the Swedish Championships, behind Wagner. At the Ghent World Challenge Cup, she finished fourth on uneven bars and sixth on floor exercise.

Adlerteg finished 64th in the all-around qualification for the 2011 World Championships in Tokyo with a score of 51.966. After the World Championships, she competed at the 2011 Northern European Championships, and she helped the Swedish team won the gold medal ahead of Wales and Iceland. Individually, she won the gold medal on the uneven bars and tied for the bronze medal on the balance beam. In November, she was selected to compete at the 2012 Olympic Test Event.

=== 2012–2013 ===
Adlerteg placed 42nd at the Olympic Test Event, qualifying her for a spot at the 2012 Summer Olympics. She was the third Swedish female gymnast to be selected for the Olympic Games, after Lena Adomat in 1980 and 1984 and Veronica Wagner in 2004. She competed at the 2012 European Championships, where the Swedish team finished 16th in the qualification round. At the Ghent World Challenge Cup, she finished fourth on the uneven bars. She represented Sweden at the 2012 Summer Olympics and at age 17 was the youngest athlete on the Swedish team. She finished 39th in the all-around qualification with a score of 52.199 and did not advance to the finals.

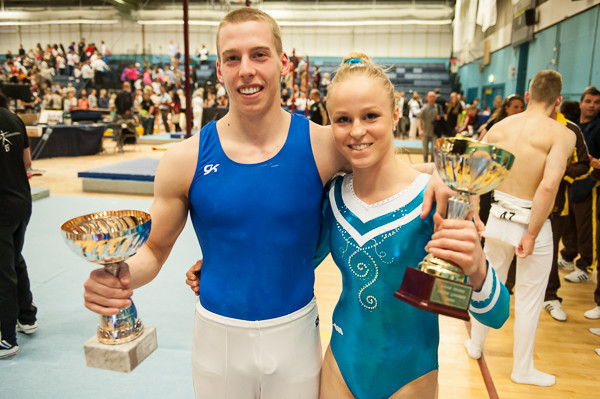
Adlerteg (right) at the 2013 Swedish Championships

Adlerteg won a silver medal on the uneven bars at the 2013 European Championships, behind Aliya Mustafina. It was Sweden's first European medal in women's gymnastics since 1963. She then won the all-around title at the Swedish Championships. She chose to withdraw from the World Championships after having an allergic reaction a few weeks before the competition along with other health issues.

=== 2014–2017 ===
Adlerteg competed as a guest at the 2014 Belgian Championships and won gold in the all-around. She then defended her Swedish all-around title. She then finished seventh on the uneven bars at the Osijek World Challenge Cup. She was the first reserve for the uneven bars final at the 2014 European Championships. She competed at the Romanian Championships as a guest, where she finished fourth in the all-around. She helped the Swedish team finish fourth at the Novara Cup and had the highest score of the competition on the uneven bars. Then at the World Championships, Adlerteg helped the Swedish gymnastics team finish 21st and qualify for the 2015 World Championships.

Adlerteg started the 2015 season at the Cottbus World Challenge Cup and won the gold medal in the uneven bars final. This was also her first World Cup medal. She then won the silver medal on the uneven bars at the Ljubljana World Challenge Cup. At the 2015 European Championships, she qualified for the all-around final, but she fell off the uneven bars and did not advance to the event final. During the all-around final, she tore her ACL on the floor exercise and had to withdraw from the competition.

Adlerteg returned to competition in 2016 and won the gold medal on the uneven bars at the Doha World Challenge Cup. Despite winning the gold medal, she ruptured a meniscus on the landing of her dismount, and this injury kept her out of the 2016 Olympics. She returned to competition at the 2017 Szombathely World Challenge Cup and won the gold medal on the uneven bars. She then competed on the uneven bars at the 2017 World Championships but did not advance into the final.

=== 2018 ===
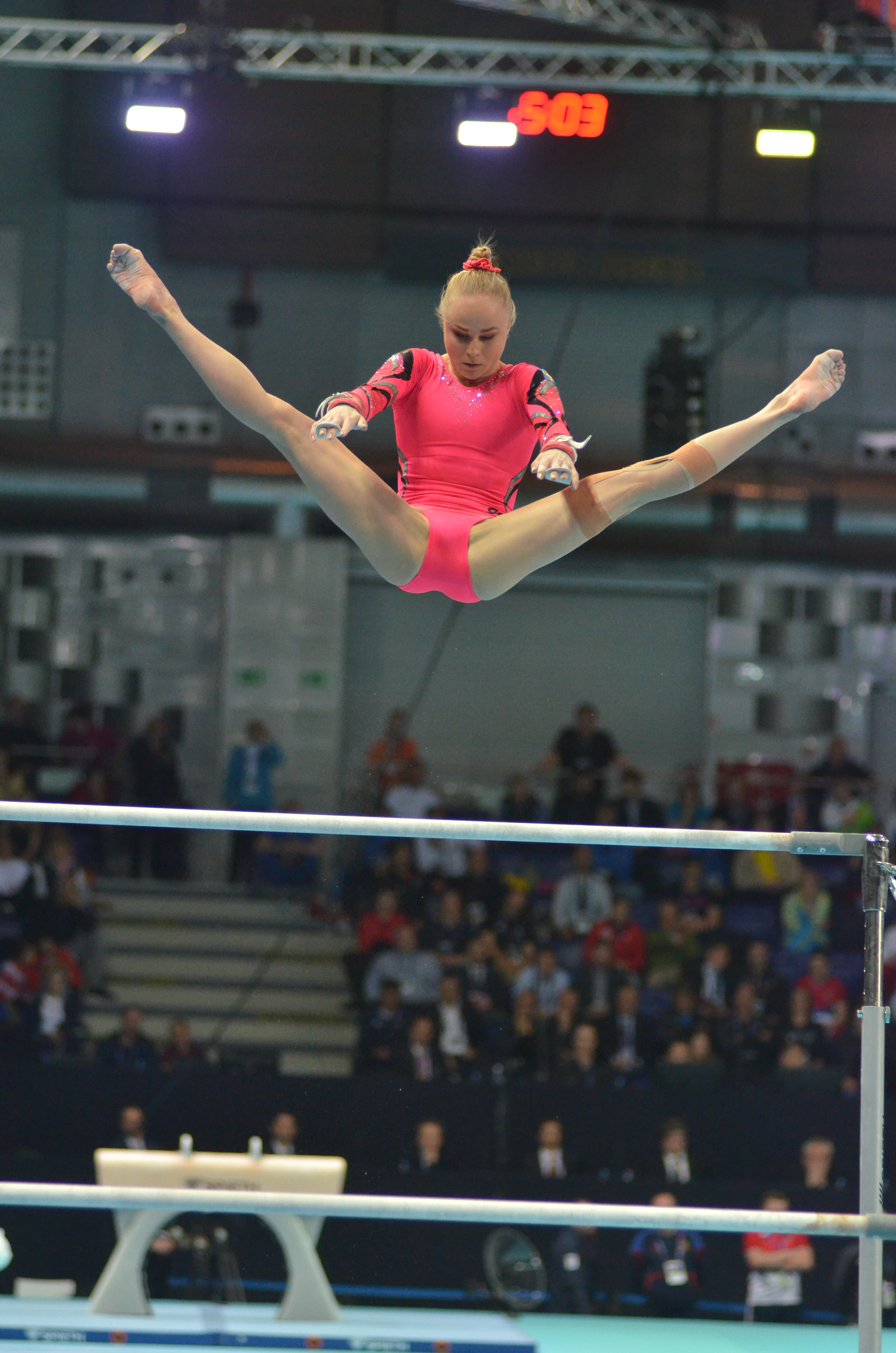
Adlerteg at the 2019 European Championships

Adlerteg began the season at the Nordic Championships and helped the Swedish team win the silver medal, behind Norway. Even though she fell in the uneven bars event final, she still won the gold medal. She then competed at her first Swedish Championships since 2014 and won a gold medal on the uneven bars. At the European Championships, she won her second European silver medal on the uneven bars. She then won the uneven bars gold medal at the Szombathely World Challenge Cup and the silver medal at the Paris World Challenge Cup. She qualified for the uneven bars final at the World Championships, becoming the first Swedish female gymnast to qualify for a World Championship event final since 1958. She fell in the final and finished in eighth place.

=== 2019 ===
Adlerteg made her season debut at the Melbourne World Cup, where she finished fourth on the uneven bars. She then finished fifth at the Baku World Cup and fourth at the Doha World Cup. She qualified for the uneven bars final at the European Championships and finished fifth. At the Swedish Championships, she competed in the all-around for the first time in four years, and she won the all-around bronze medal. In the event finals, she won the gold medals on the uneven bars and the balance beam. She then competed at the Heerenveen Friendly and finished 11th in the all-around, and she finished 19th in the all-around at the Worms Friendly. At the World Championships, she fell off the uneven bars during the qualification round. She ultimately finished 75th in the all-around and earned a berth for the 2020 Olympic Games.

=== 2020–2021 ===
Due to the COVID-19 pandemic, Adlerteg's only competition in 2020 was the Swedish Championships. She only competed on the uneven bars and won the gold medal.

Adlerteg finished sixth in the uneven bars final at the 2021 European Championships. Then at the Osijek World Challenge Cup, she finished fourth in the uneven bars final. She then represented Sweden at the 2020 Summer Olympics. She only competed on the uneven bars, and during the qualification round, she scored 14.533. She was the second reserve for the final, finishing only 0.033 behind the final qualifier. She chose to not compete at the 2021 World Championships.

Adlerteg announced her retirement from gymnastics on 28 April 2022.

== Post-gymnastics ==
In autumn 2020, Adlerteg began studying at Örebro University in the biomedical analyst program. Adlerteg was a commentator for the 2022 Swedish Gymnastics Championships. She appeared on the 2023 season of the Swedish reality competition show Mästarnas mästare.

== Competitive history ==
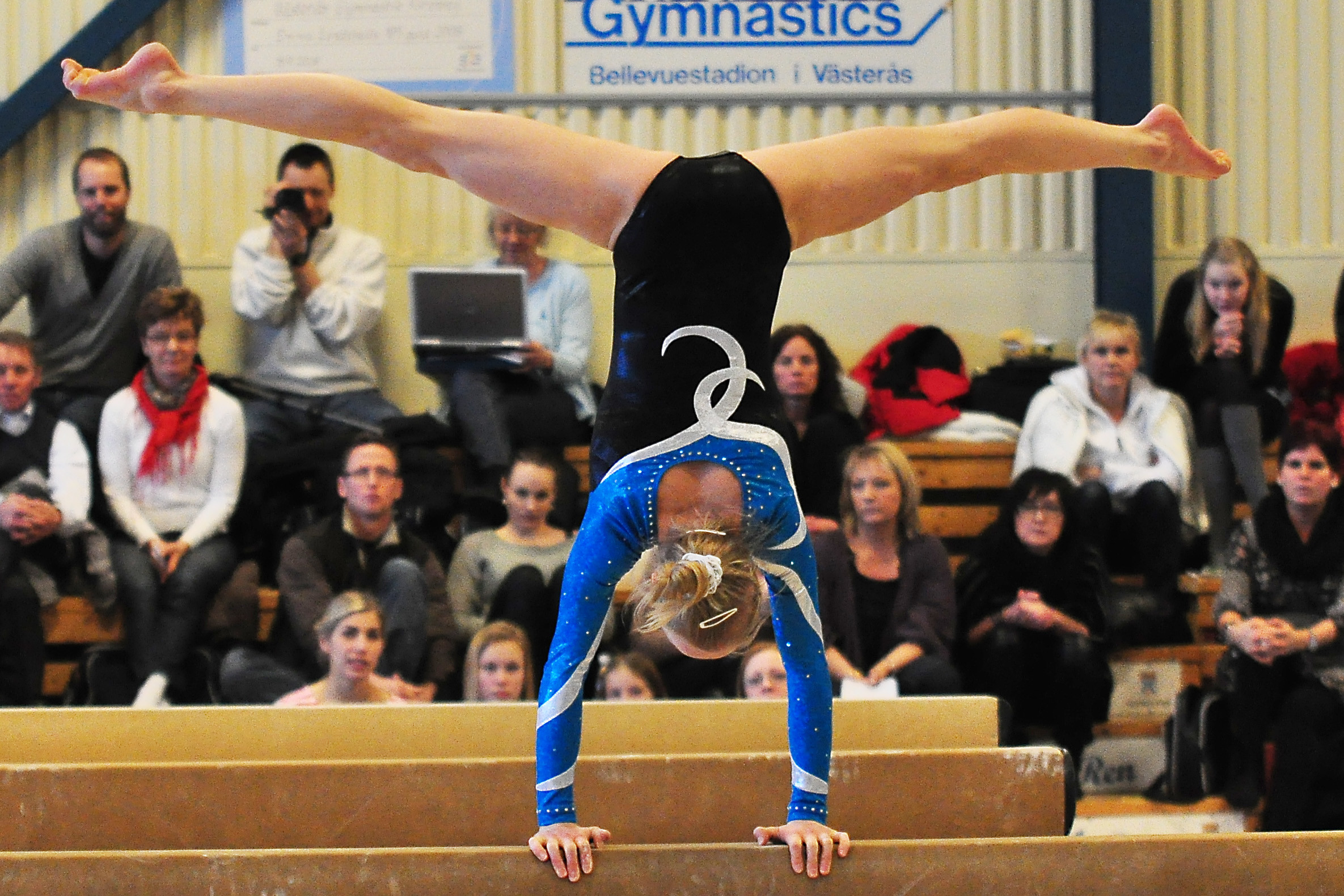
Adlerteg in 2010

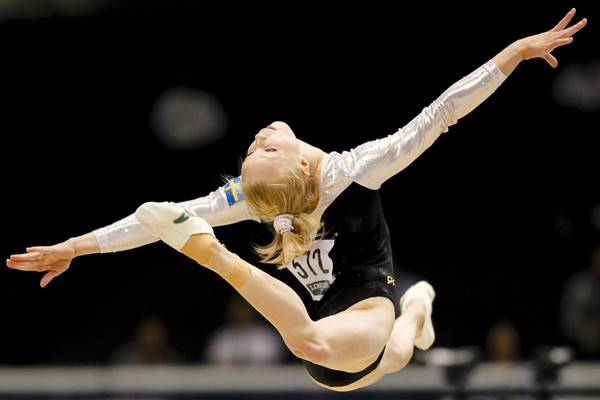
Adlerteg at the 2011 World Championships

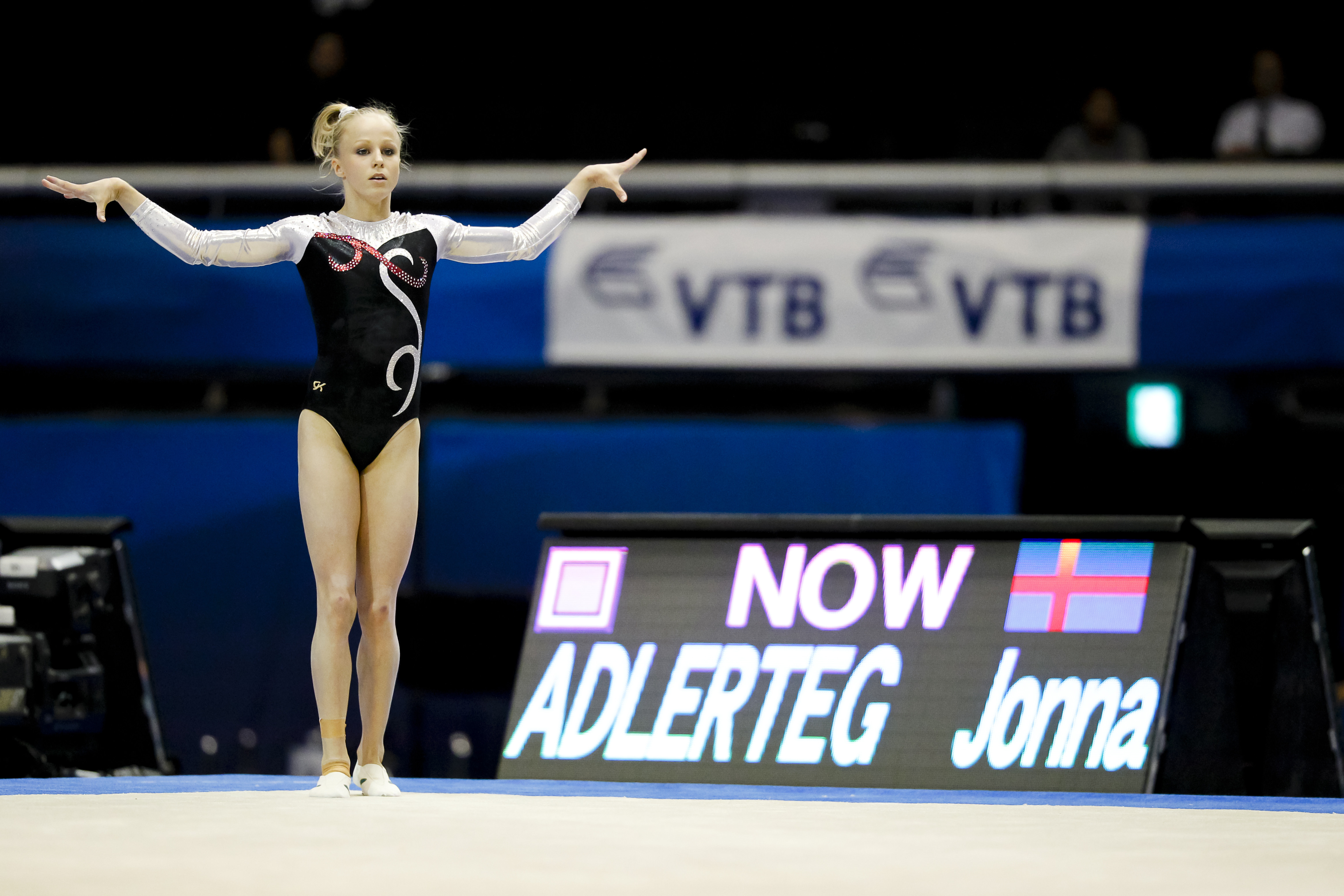
Adlerteg at the 2011 World Championships

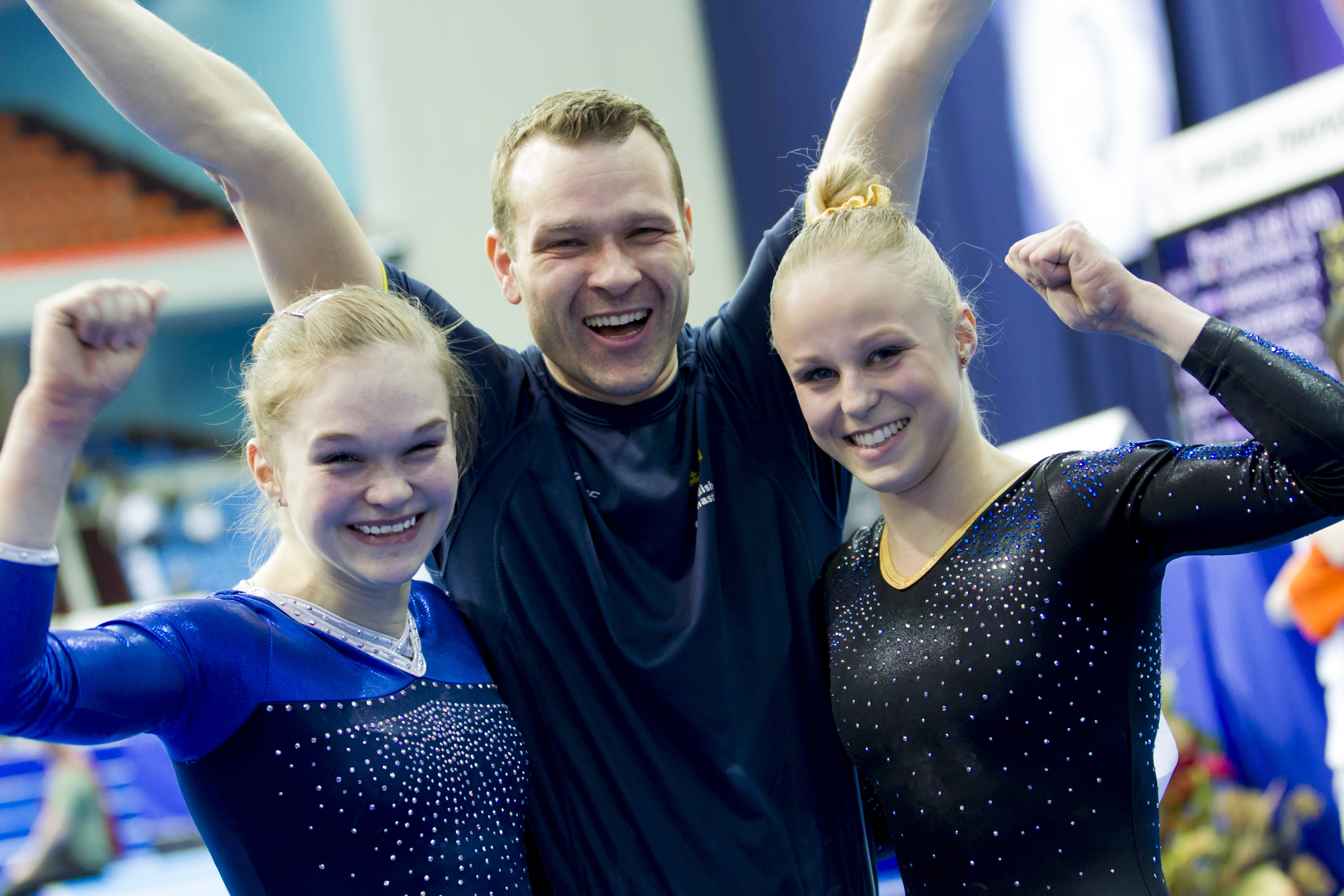
Adlerteg (right) at the 2013 European Championships

Competitive history of Jonna Adlerteg
Year	Event	Team	AA	VT	UB	BB	FX
2010
2010	Junior European Championships		11		4		
2010	Youth Olympic Games		10		3rd place, bronze medalist(s)	8	7
2011
2011	European Championships		23				
2011	Swedish Championships		2nd place, silver medalist(s)				
2011	Ghent World Challenge Cup				4		6
2011	Northern European Championships	1st place, gold medalist(s)			1st place, gold medalist(s)	3rd place, bronze medalist(s)	
2012	Olympic Test Event		42				
2012	Ghent World Challenge Cup				4		
2012	Olympic Games		39				
2013
2013	European Championships				2nd place, silver medalist(s)		
2013	Swedish Championships		1st place, gold medalist(s)				
2014	Belgian Championships		1st place, gold medalist(s)				
2014	Swedish Championships		1st place, gold medalist(s)				
2014	Osijek World Challenge Cup				7		
2014	Romanian Championships		4				
2014	Novara Cup	4	15				
2015	Cottbus World Challenge Cup				1st place, gold medalist(s)		
2015	Ljubljana World Challenge Cup				2nd place, silver medalist(s)	5	6
2015	European Championships		DNF				
2016	Doha World Challenge Cup				1st place, gold medalist(s)		
2017	Szombathely World Challenge Cup				1st place, gold medalist(s)		
2018	Nordic Championships	2nd place, silver medalist(s)			1st place, gold medalist(s)		
2018	Swedish Championships				1st place, gold medalist(s)		
2018	European Championships				2nd place, silver medalist(s)		
2018	Szombathely World Challenge Cup				1st place, gold medalist(s)		
2018	Paris World Challenge Cup				2nd place, silver medalist(s)		
2018	World Championships				8		
2019	Melbourne World Cup				4		
2019	Baku World Cup				5		
2019	Doha World Cup				4		
2019	European Championships				5		
2019	Swedish Championships		3rd place, bronze medalist(s)		1st place, gold medalist(s)	1st place, gold medalist(s)	
2019	Heerenveen Friendly		11				
2019	Worms Friendly		19				
2020	Swedish Championships				1st place, gold medalist(s)		
2021
2021	European Championships				6		
2021	Osijek World Challenge Cup				4		
2021	Olympic Games				R2		
