= Tiley =

Tiley is a surname. Notable people with the surname include:

- Arthur Tiley (1910–1994), British Conservative and National Liberal politician
- Brad Tiley (born 1971), Canadian retired professional ice hockey defenceman
- Craig Tiley (born 1962), South African tennis executive and retired U.S college tennis coach
- Roger Tiley, Welsh documentary photographer
- Steven Tiley (born 1982), English professional golfer

== See also ==
- Tilley (disambiguation)
- Tilley's
- Tilney (disambiguation)
