= Jessica Hogg =

Welsh artistic gymnast

Personal information
- Nationality: Welsh
- Born: 12 October 1995 (age 30)

Sport
- Country: Wales
- Sport: artistic gymnastics
Medal record
Commonwealth Games
Bronze medal – third place	2014 Glasgow	Team
Northern European Gymnastics Championships
Gold medal – first place	2012 Glasgow	Team
Gold medal – first place	2012 Glasgow	Balance beam
Gold medal – first place	2012 Glasgow	Floor
Silver medal – second place	2011 Uppsala	Team
Silver medal – second place	2011 Uppsala	Vault

Jessica Hogg (born 12 October 1995) is a Welsh artistic gymnast.

Hogg competed in the 2010 Youth Olympics. She won a bronze medal at the 2014 Commonwealth Games in the team event. She has also won medals at the Northern European Gymnastic Championships with two silver medals in 2011 in the team and vault events and three gold medals in 2012 in the team, balance beam and floor events.
