= Clinton Purnell =

Welsh artistic gymnast (born 1989)

- Born: 5 May 1989 (age 37)

Gymnastics career
- Discipline: Men's artistic gymnastics
- Country represented: Wales
Medal record
Men's artistic gymnastics
Representing Wales
Northern European Championships
Gold medal – first place	2011 Uppsala	Team
Gold medal – first place	2016 Trondheim	Vault
Silver medal – second place	2013 Lisburn	Floor exercise
Silver medal – second place	2013 Lisburn	Rings
Silver medal – second place	2017 Tórshavn	Team
Silver medal – second place	2017 Tórshavn	Horizontal bar
Bronze medal – third place	2013 Lisburn	Team
Bronze medal – third place	2013 Lisburn	All-around
Bronze medal – third place	2016 Trondheim	Floor exercise
Bronze medal – third place	2017 Tórshavn	Floor exercise

Clinton Purnell (born 5 May 1989) is a Welsh gymnast.

Purnell is a multiple Welsh champion and competed at the 2010 Commonwealth Games and most recently the 2014 Commonwealth Games in Glasgow.

Clinton trained at and was a member of Barry Y.M.C.A Gymnastics Club.
