= Sarah Beck =

Canadian artist

Sarah Beck is a Canadian artist from Saskatoon, Saskatchewan. She received her Bachelor from Ryerson Polytechnic University, and her Masters from The Ontario College of Art and Design University. She currently works and lives in Toronto, Ontario.

== Artistic approach ==
Beck's artistic practice is characterized by its humour and its accessibility. These characteristics are employed to address her interests, frequently subjects of ecology, economy, labour and questions of fact and fiction. Her work is often large-scale, and can be seen outside of the traditional gallery space as often as inside.

In 2001, Beck entered the art scene with her first artwork ÖDE. ÖDE is a company that designs, markets and produces economically affordable weapons using inexpensive materials. The weapons can be purchased in one of seven seasonal colours and assembled using an allan key. ÖDE premiered in Vancouver at the Third Avenue Gallery in August 2001, going on to be exhibited widely, including in Seattle and Philadelphia, and winning her The Canada Council's Joseph S Stauffer Prize, created to "encourage young Canadians of outstanding promise or potential." The original ÖDE armoured vehicle will be on display in Calgary at The Military Museums until early September 2018.

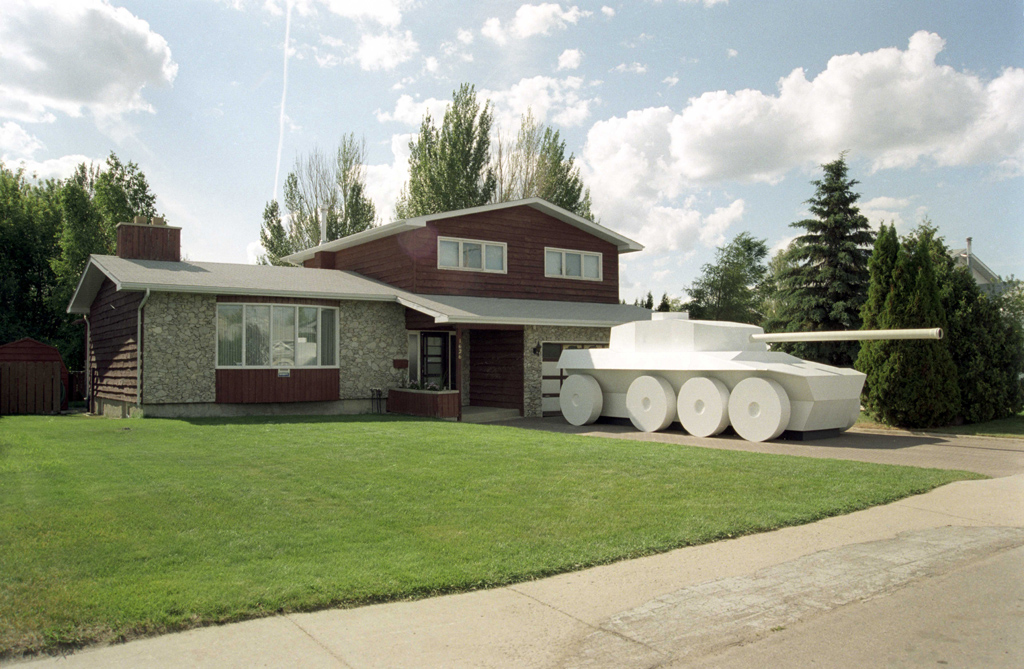
Sarah Beck, ÖDE, 2001

In 2009, Beck created Dirty Loonie as Canada's official entry into the VIièmes International Jeux de la Francophonie in Beirut, Lebanon, winning Canada a silver medal in the sculpture category. This artwork went on to be exhibited at the 2010 Vancouver Olympic Games in the Cultural Olympiad, and in Toronto's 2012 Nuit Blanche as part of The Museum for the End of the World. Beck also created Postcards from the End as part of The Museum for the End of the World. Beck describes Postcards from the End as "sculptural postcards viewers posed with to commemorate their visit". The three large-scale works were disaster themed life-sized dioramas meant for the taking and sharing of selfies, and meant to blend photo ops with disaster.

In 2015, her work The Light, was exhibited in Jubilee Plaza in Fort McMurray, Alberta at the end of 2015. Created as an epitaph to the last days of the tungsten light bulb, which as of 2015 will no longer be produced in North America, The Light is filled with 360 light bulbs that ran continuously until they all burned out. The channel letters are a line from Dylan Thomas' poem 'Do Not Go Gentle Into That Good Night'.

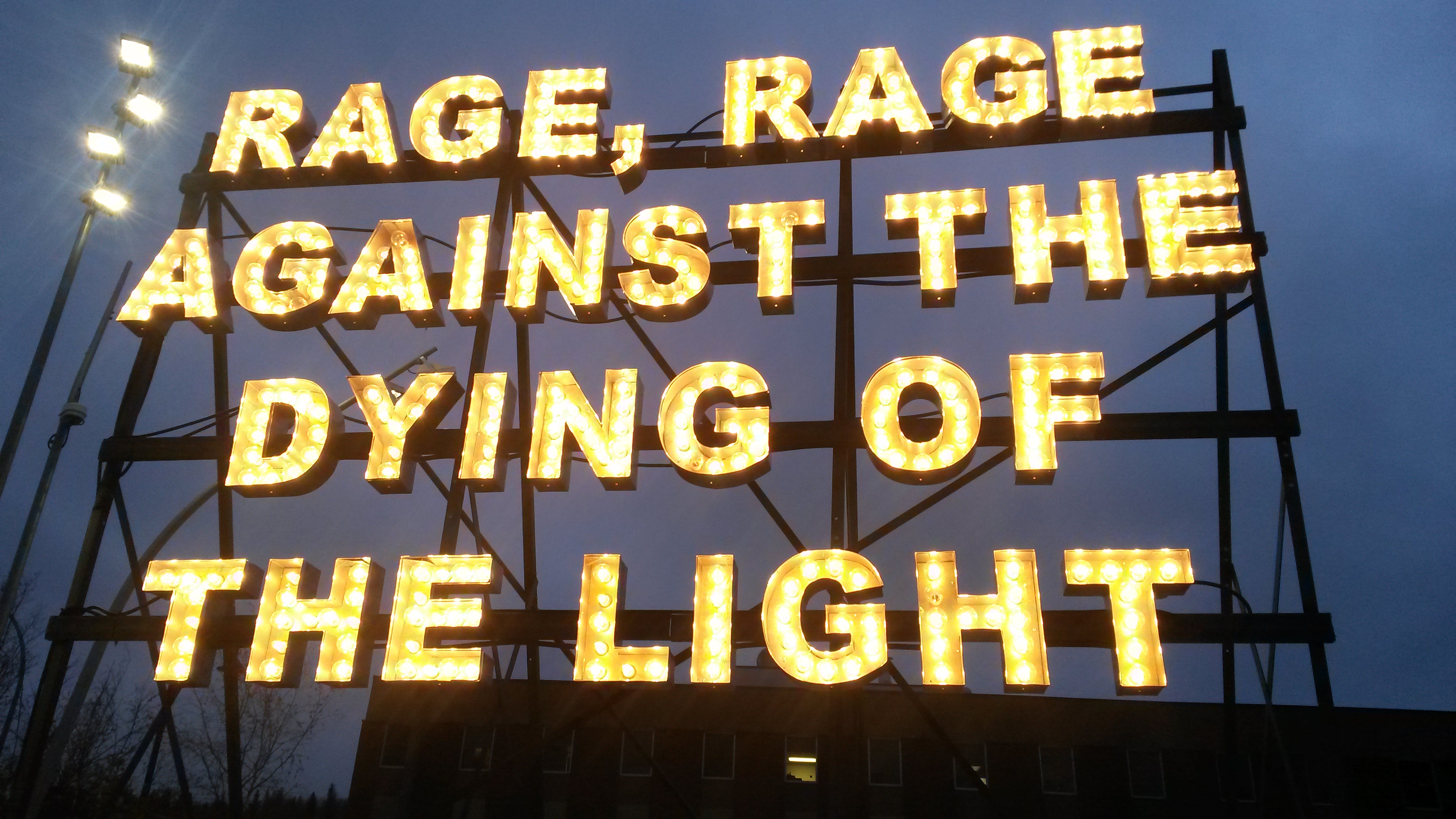
Sarah Beck, The Light, 2015

As part of Gallery, Sarah Beck and her frequent collaborator Shlomi Greenspan exhibited Clean Sweep, a converted claw machine with a miniature imagined version of the aging Galleria Shopping Centre. The exhibition was curated by Aisle 4.
