= Juho Heikki Pakkala =

Finnish farmer and politician (1877–1952)

Juho Heikki (J. H.) Pakkala (16 March 1877 – 24 October 1952) was a Finnish farmer and politician, born in Veteli. He was a member of the Parliament of Finland from 1909 to 1910, representing the Finnish Party.
