= Emma White (gymnast) =

British artistic gymnast (born 1990)

- Born: 19 March 1990 (age 36) Dunfermline, Scotland
- Height: 1.56 m (5 ft 1 in)

Gymnastics career
- Discipline: Women's artistic gymnastics
- Country represented: Great Britain; Scotland
- Club: City of Birmingham Gymnastics Club
- Head coach: Jody Kime
Medal record
Women's artistic gymnastics
Representing Scotland
Northern European Championships
Silver medal – second place	2013 Lisburn	Team
Bronze medal – third place	2013 Lisburn	Uneven bars

Emma White (born 19 March 1990) is a British former artistic gymnast. She competed for Great Britain at the 2006 World Championships and for Scotland at the 2006 and 2014 Commonwealth Games. She won two medals at the 2013 Northern European Championships.

== Gymnastics career ==
White represented Scotland at the 2006 Commonwealth Games and finished 13th in the all-around final and sixth in the vault final. She won the vault title at the 2006 British Championships, and she finished eighth in the all-around and seventh on the floor exercise. She was then selected to compete for Great Britain at the 2006 World Championships in Aarhus, Denmark. She competed on the vault and floor exercise to help the team finish 11th in the qualification round.

White was selected for Scotland's team for the 2010 Commonwealth Games, but she injured her knee in training and returned home for knee surgery. At the 2013 Northern European Championships, she won a silver medal with the Scottish team and a bronze medal on the uneven bars. Additionally, she finished fourth in the all-around competition. She won a bronze medal on the vault at the 2014 British Championships, behind Kelly Simm and Claudia Fragapane, and she finished 13th in the all-around.

White won the all-around, uneven bars, and balance beam titles at the 2014 Scottish Championships. She then represented Scotland at the 2014 Commonwealth Games. She led the Scottish team to a fifth-place finish. Individually, she qualified for the all-around final, where she finished tenth, and for the vault final, where she finished eighth. She announced her retirement from the sport after the competition.
