= Daniel Iley =

Scottish gymnast (born 1996)

- Born: 17 September 1996 (age 29)
- Height: 1.78 m (5 ft 10 in)

Gymnastics career
- Discipline: Men's artistic gymnastics
- Country represented: Scotland
- College team: Loughborough Students
- Club: Exeter Gymnastics Club
Medal record
Representing Scotland
Northern European Gymnastics Championships
Silver medal – second place	2013 Lisburn	Team

Daniel Iley (born 17 September 1996) is a Scottish gymnast.

== Early life ==
Iley was born in Edinburgh, Scotland, on 17 September 1996. He was the 2013 Scottish junior all-around champion.

== Gymnastics career ==
Iley represented Scotland at the 2013 Northern European Championships in Lisburn, Northern Ireland, and helped Team Scotland win silver in the team event.

After the 2014 Commonwealth Invitationals, Iley was in contention for a spot on the senior national team for the Commonwealth Games.
