= Anna Erika Pakkala =

Finnish artistic gymnast

- Born: 5 March 1995 (age 31)

Gymnastics career
- Discipline: Women's artistic gymnastics
- Country represented: Finland (2014)

Anna Erika Pakkala (born 5 March 1995) is a Finnish female artistic gymnast, representing her nation at international competitions.

She competed at world championships, including the 2014 World Artistic Gymnastics Championships in Nanning, China.
