= Tutya Yılmaz =

Turkish artistic gymnast

- Full name: Tutya Yılmaz
- Born: 4 June 1999 (age 27) Istanbul, Turkey
- Height: 150 cm (4 ft 11 in)

Gymnastics career
- Discipline: Women's artistic gymnastics
- Country represented: Turkey
- Club: Istanbul Gymnastics Club
- Retired: 15 October 2019
Medal record
Artistic gymnastics
Representing Turkey
FIG World Cup
Gold medal – first place	2016 Mersin	Balance Beam
Silver medal – second place	2018 Mersin	Uneven Bars
Silver medal – second place	2018 Mersin	Balance Beam
Silver medal – second place	2018 Mersin	Floor Exercise
Silver medal – second place	2019 Mersin	Floor Exercise

Tutya Yılmaz (born 4 June 1999 in Istanbul) is a Turkish female artistic gymnast who represented Turkey at the 2014 Youth Olympics and the 2016 Summer Olympics. In 2016, she was named Turkish Female Athlete of the Year.

== Early life ==
Yılmaz was born in Bakırköy, Istanbul, Turkey in 1999, and started gymnastics at age 4. She attended Ekrem Elginkan High School in Istanbul.

== Career ==
=== Junior ===
==== 2013 ====
In June, Yılmaz competed at the Olympic Hopes meet in Penza, Russia, where she placed fourth in the all-around, fifth on bars and floor, and won the bronze medal on beam. In July, she competed at the 2013 European Youth Olympic Festival, finishing 24th in the all-around and 12th with the Turkish team.

==== 2014 ====
Yılmaz competed at the 2014 Junior European Championships in Sofia. She did not make any finals, but her performance in qualifications earned her a spot at the Youth Olympic Games. At the Youth Olympic Games, Yılmaz qualified to the all-around final, where she finished 10th. She also placed eighth in the vault and floor exercise finals. Later that year, Yılmaz competed at the Mediterranean Junior Championships in Italy, where she placed fourth in the all-around and on vault, fifth on the uneven bars and won the gold medal on the balance beam.

=== Senior ===
==== 2015 ====
Yılmaz made her senior debut at the Cottbus World Cup in Germany, placing seventh in the floor final. In April, Yılmaz competed at the 2015 European Championships and placed 49th all-around during qualifications. At the Varna World Cup, she placed ninth on vault, fifth on beam and sixth on floor. Yılmaz represented Turkey at the 2015 European Games in Baku and finished 13th in the all-around final. She competed at the 2015 World Championships in Glasgow but did not make any finals.

==== 2016 ====
At the 2016 Turkish Championships, Yılmaz won the gold medal in the all-around as well as on vault and beam, and took the silver on bars and the bronze on floor. Yılmaz placed 53rd at the Olympic Test Event, and qualified to the 2016 Summer Olympics as an individual, becoming the second Turkish gymnast to qualify to the Olympic Games after Göksu Üçtaş Şanlı. She followed that up with a sixth place finish on beam at the Varna World Cup. In June, she competed at the European Championships, but did not make the event finals. At the Mersin World Cup in July, she won the balance beam gold in front of a home crowd, and placed fourth on floor and fifth on the uneven bars. During qualifications at the Olympics, Yılmaz placed 42nd all-around and scored an outstanding 14.500 on the balance beam, making her the third reserve for the balance beam final.

==== 2017 ====
Yılmaz competed at the 2017 World Championships in Montreal but was limited to the uneven bars due to a knee injury, and did not make the event finals.

==== 2018 ====
Yılmaz returned to competition at the Koper World Cup, finishing eighth in the floor final. At the Mediterranean Games, Yılmaz helped the Turkish team finish fifth in the team final, and placed 10th in the all-around and sixth on the uneven bars individually. At the Mersin World Cup, Yılmaz won three silver medals in front of a home crowd: one on the uneven bars, one on the balance beam and one on floor. She competed at the 2018 European Championships, but did not make the finals. In September, she competed at the Szombathely World Cup and qualified to the floor final. However, she struggled in the final, and placed eighth. Yılmaz was part of the Turkish team competing at the 2018 World Championships in Doha, and placed 60th all-around in qualifications, missing out on the finals.

==== 2019 ====
In March, Yılmaz competed at the Turkish Championships, winning the silver medal in the all-around, and taking the bronze in both the uneven bars and balance beam finals. Later that month, she competed at the Baku World Cup and the Doha World Cup, but she did not make any finals. At the Mersin World Cup, Yılmaz won a silver medal on the floor exercise and placed fifth in the balance beam final. Yılmaz competed at the 2019 World Championships in Stuttgart, but failed to qualify to the 2020 Summer Olympics

==== Retirement ====
Yılmaz announced her retirement on 15 October 2019, shortly after the 2019 World Championships. On 13 June 2020, Yılmaz uploaded a video to YouTube, in which she revealed that she was subjected to mobbing and psychological abuse by her managers, which contributed to her decision to retire from gymnastics.

== Competitive history ==
Year	Event	Team	AA	VT	UB	BB	FX
Junior
2013	Austrian Team Open	3rd place, bronze medalist(s)	8				
2013	Olympic Hopes		4		5	3rd place, bronze medalist(s)	5
2013	European Youth Olympic Festival	12	24				
2014	Junior European Championships	14 (Note: Qualifications.)					
2014	Youth Olympic Games		10	8			8
2014	Mediterranean Junior Championships		4	4	5	1st place, gold medalist(s)	
Senior
2015	Cottbus World Cup						7
2015	European Championships		49				
2015	Varna World Cup			9		5	6
2015	European Games		13				
2015	Osijek World Cup						8
2015	World Championships		67				
2016	Baku World Cup					6	7
2016	Turkish Championships		1st place, gold medalist(s)	1st place, gold medalist(s)	2nd place, silver medalist(s)	1st place, gold medalist(s)	3rd place, bronze medalist(s)
2016	Olympic Test Event		53				
2016	Varna World Cup					6	
2016	Mersin World Cup				5	1st place, gold medalist(s)	4
2016	Olympic Games		42			R3	
2018	Koper World Cup						8
2018	Mediterranean Games	5	10		6		
2018	Mersin World Cup				2nd place, silver medalist(s)	2nd place, silver medalist(s)	2nd place, silver medalist(s)
2018	Szombathely World Cup						8
2018	World Championships		60				
2019	Turkish Championships		2nd place, silver medalist(s)		3rd place, bronze medalist(s)	3rd place, bronze medalist(s)	
2019	Mersin World Cup					5	2nd place, silver medalist(s)
2019	World Championships		91				
