= Emma Larsson =

Swedish artistic gymnast

- Full name: Emma Maud Valborg Larsson
- Born: 15 November 1998 (age 27) Skogstorp, Eskilstuna Municipality
- Height: 1.47 m (4 ft 10 in)

Gymnastics career
- Discipline: Women's artistic gymnastics
- Country represented: Sweden (2012 — 2016 (SWE))
- Club: Eskilstuna Gymnastics Club
- Head coach: Helena Andreasson
- Retired: 2017
Medal record
Representing Sweden
FIG World Cup
Event	1st	2nd	3rd
Apparatus World Cup	1	0	0
World Challenge Cup	0	2	0
Total	1	2	0

Emma Maud Valborg Larsson (born 15 November 1998) is a Swedish former artistic gymnast. Larsson participated at the 2014 and 2015 World Championships and eventually qualified for 2016 Summer Olympics, where she placed 35th all-around in the qualifying stage of the competition.

== Career ==
Larsson qualified for the all-around final at the 2012 Junior European Championships and finished 16th. At the 2013 European Youth Olympic Festival, the Swedish team of Larsson, Kim Singmuang, and Ece Ayan placed sixth. Individually, Larsson placed fifth in the vault and floor exercise finals and eighth in the all-around and uneven bars finals.

Larsson became age-eligible for senior international competitions in 2014. At the 2014 European Championships, Larsson and the Swedish team placed 12th in the qualification round. Then at the 2014 World Championships, the Swedish team finished 21st in the qualification round. Individually, Larsson finished 43rd in the all-around, scoring 52.832.

Larsson won the gold medal on the balance beam at the 2015 Anadia World Cup. She competed with the Swedish team that placed 22nd in the qualification round of the 2015 World Championships.

Larsson won silver medals on both the balance beam and floor exercise at the 2016 Baku World Challenge Cup. At the 2016 Olympic Test Event, she fell on both the balance beam and floor exercise, but she still placed high enough to earn an individual berth for the Olympic Games. The Swedish Olympic Committee confirmed her selection for the Olympic Games in May.

Larsson represented Sweden at the 2016 Summer Olympics. She placed 35th in the all-around during the qualification round with a total score of 54.332 after a fall off the uneven bars. She did not advance into the all-around final.

Shortly after the Olympic Games, Larsson tore her meniscus and had surgery. This injury caused her to miss the 2017 World Championships. She announced her retirement in December 2017.
