= Veronica Wagner =

Swedish artistic gymnast

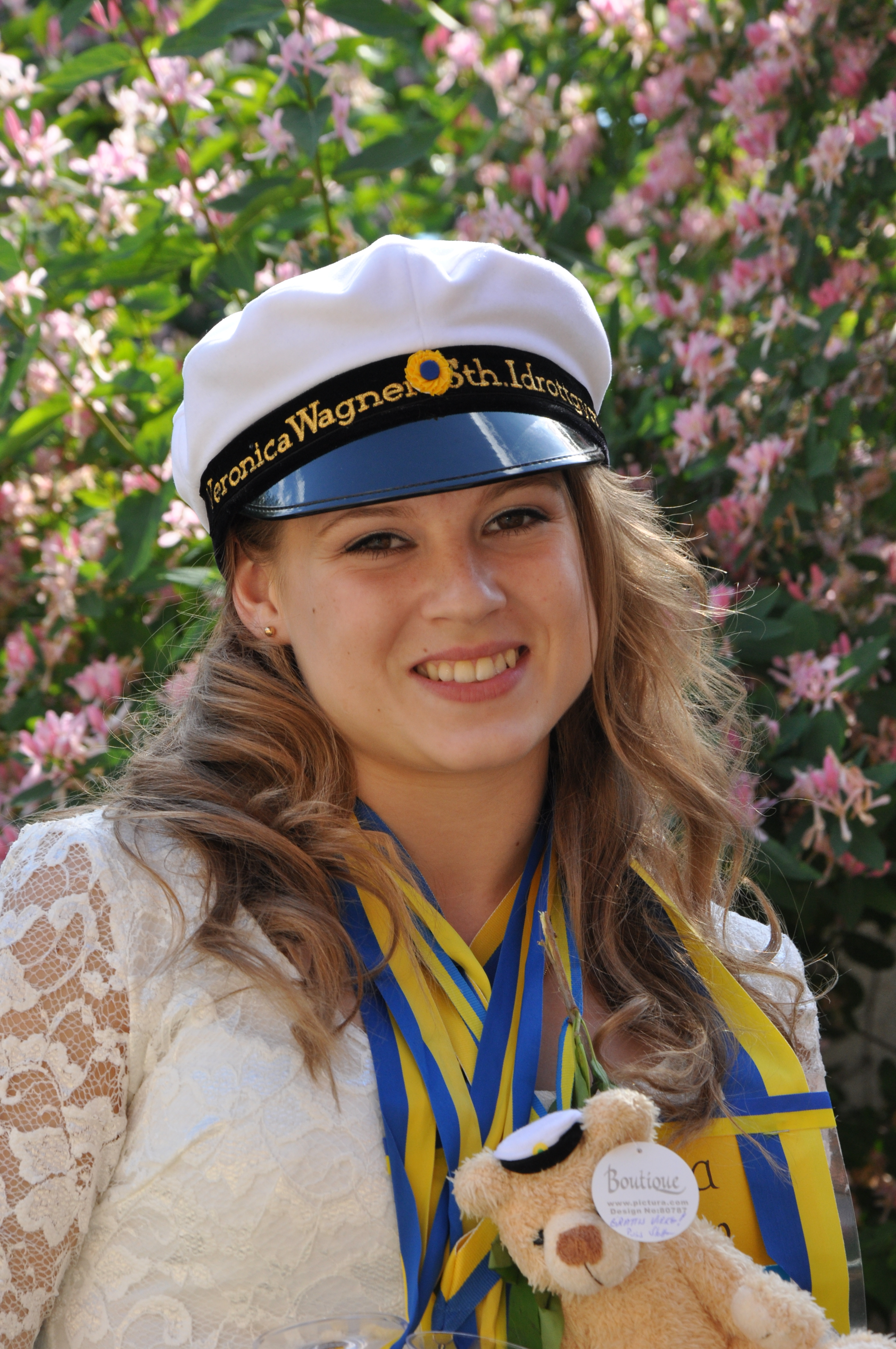
- Veronica Wagner in June 2010

Personal information
- Full name: Isabella Minna Veronica Wagner
- Born: July 7, 1987 (age 39) Stockholm, Sweden

Gymnastics career
- Discipline: Women's artistic gymnastics
- Country represented: Sweden
- Head coach: Staffan Söderberg

Isabella Minna Veronica Wagner, better known as Veronica (born July 7, 1987), is a gymnast who competed at the 2004 Summer Olympics as a member of the Swedish Olympic team. She is coached by Staffan Söderberg.

== Early life ==
Wagner was born in Stockholm, and started gymnastics at the age of 5. She progressed quickly through the sport's levels, qualifying as an international elite at the age of 12. She is Sweden's most successful gymnast, having won the national title 7 times (2002, 2004–2008 and 2011) and represented her country at the Olympics, World Championships and European Championships. She has also been a finalist at several World Cup events and in the 2009 Worlds all-around competition.

== Gymnastics career ==
Wagner is a powerful and innovative gymnast, particularly on the floor exercise. She pioneered the double piked front, which she successfully competed at the 2006 European Championships. She performed well at these championships, with a score that would have been good enough to place her 13th if an all-around competition had been held. She competed with the Swedish team at the 2006 World Artistic Gymnastics Championships, and while the team did not qualify for the 2007 World Artistic Gymnastics Championships, which served as qualifiers to the Olympics, Wagner qualified as an individual. She stated in an interview with International Gymnast magazine that her goals for 2007 were to win a World Cup medal and to qualify to the 2008 Beijing Olympic Games.

Wagner achieved both of these goals. At the 2007 World Championships, she qualified to her second Olympic Games as an individual competitor for Sweden. She also had World Cup success in 2007: She won the silver medal on vault at the Maribor World Cup, held in Slovenia, and two gold medals (vault and balance beam) and a bronze (floor) at the Buenos Aires World Cup.

After winning the Swedish Championships in June 2008, Wagner was told that the Swedish Olympic Committee would not send her to Beijing to compete in the Olympic Games. A fan-driven petition was created in protest.

After this disappointment, Wagner continued to compete in gymnastics. At the 2009 World Championships, she qualified to the all-around final for the first time in her career.

== Post-gymnastics career ==
For the 2012 Olympics, she was contracted by Swedish national television as a commentator for the gymnastics competition.

== Results ==
2002 Swedish Championships - 1st AA
2003 Northern European Championships - 2nd AA, 1st FX, 1st BB, 7th UB, 1st V
2003 Swedish Championships - 2nd AA
2003 Swedish Cup - 1st AA
2004 Swedish Championships - 1st AA, 1st V
2004 Olympic Games - 55th AA
2005 Swedish Championships - 1st AA, 1st FX, 2nd BB, 8th UB, 2nd V
2005 World Championships - 30th AA
2006 Swedish Nationals - 1st AA, 1st FX, 1st BB, 2nd UB, 1st V
2006 Ghent World Cup - 6th V
2006 French International - 6th BB, 5th FX
2006 North European Championships - 1st AA, 3rd UB, 1st BB, 1st FX
2006 World Championships - 62nd AA
2007 Maribor World Cup - 2nd V, 7th BB
