= Canada at the 2014 Commonwealth Games =

- CG code: CAN
- CGA: Commonwealth Games Canada
- Website: commonwealthgames.ca

in Glasgow, Scotland
- Competitors: 265 in 16 sports
- Flag bearers: Susan Nattrass (opening); Sultana Frizell (closing)
- Medals Ranked 3rd: Gold 32 Silver 16 Bronze 34 Total 82

Commonwealth Games appearances (overview)
- 1930; 1934; 1938; 1950; 1954; 1958; 1962; 1966; 1970; 1974; 1978; 1982; 1986; 1990; 1994; 1998; 2002; 2006; 2010; 2014; 2018; 2022; 2026; 2030

Other related appearances
- Newfoundland (1930, 1934)

Canada competed in the 2014 Commonwealth Games in Glasgow, Scotland from July 23 to August 3, 2014. It was the nation's 20th appearance at the Commonwealth Games, having competed at every Games since their inception in 1930. Canada competed in 16 out of 17 sports with the only exception being netball (as the team did not qualify). Canada's team consisted of 265 athletes and 100 support staff, the largest team for a games not hosted by the country. On September 12, 2012 former Commonwealth Games medalist Chantal Petitclerc was named as the Chef de mission of the team, marking the first time a former para athlete was named to the post.

Former multiple medal winning Commonwealth Games and sport shooter Susan Nattrass was named as the team's opening ceremony flagbearer in June.

Canada finished the games winning a total of 32 gold medals and 82 medals in total. The result pushed Canada back into the top three, after finishing fourth four years ago in New Delhi.

== Medallists ==
Medal	Name	Sport	Event	Date
Gold	Ryan Cochrane	Swimming	400 m freestyle	July 24
Gold	Annabelle Kovacs; Maria Kitkarska; Patricia Bezzoubenko	Gymnastics	Rhythmic team all-around	July 24
Gold	Patricia Bezzoubenko	Gymnastics	Rhythmic individual all-around	July 25
Gold	Patricia Bezzoubenko	Gymnastics	Rhythmic individual ball	July 26
Gold	Patricia Bezzoubenko	Gymnastics	Rhythmic individual clubs	July 26
Gold	Patricia Bezzoubenko	Gymnastics	Rhythmic individual hoop	July 26
Gold	Katerine Savard	Swimming	100 m butterfly	July 25
Gold	Audrey Lacroix	Swimming	200 m butterfly	July 28
Gold	Sultana Frizell	Athletics	Hammer throw	July 28
Gold	Catharine Pendrel	Cycling	Women's cross-country	July 29
Gold	Marie-Ève Beauchemin-Nadeau	Weightlifting	Women's 75 kg	July 29
Gold	Erica Wiebe	Wrestling	Women's freestyle 75 kg	July 29
Gold	Korey Jarvis	Wrestling	Men's freestyle 125 kg	July 29
Gold	Ryan Cochrane	Swimming	1500 m freestyle	July 29
Gold	Damian Warner	Athletics	Decathlon	July 29
Gold	James Steacy	Athletics	Hammer throw	July 29
Gold	Meaghan Benfeito; Roseline Filion	Diving	Women's synchronised 10 metre platform	July 30
Gold	David Tremblay	Wrestling	Men's freestyle 61 kg	July 30
Gold	Arjun Gill	Wrestling	Men's freestyle 97 kg	July 30
Gold	Dorothy Yeats	Wrestling	Women's freestyle 69 kg	July 30
Gold	Derek Drouin	Athletics	Men's High jump	July 30
Gold	Brianne Theisen-Eaton	Athletics	Heptathlon	July 30
Gold	George Kobaladze	Weightlifting	Men's +105 kg	July 31
Gold	Danielle Lappage	Wrestling	Women's freestyle 63 kg	July 31
Gold	Scott Morgan	Gymnastics	Men's rings	July 31
Gold	Tamerlan Tagziev	Wrestling	Men's freestyle 86 kg	July 31
Gold	Meaghan Benfeito	Diving	Women's 10 m platform	July 31
Gold	Scott Morgan	Gymnastics	Men's vault	August 1
Gold	Ellie Black	Gymnastics	Women's balance beam	August 1
Gold	Jennifer Abel	Diving	Women's 1 m springboard	August 1
Gold	Samir El Mais	Boxing	Men's heavyweight	August 2
Gold	Michelle Li	Badminton	Women's singles	August 3
Silver	Kirsten Sweetland	Triathlon	Women's triathlon	July 24
Silver	James Paton; Desmond Vamplew	Shooting	Queen's prize pairs	July 26
Silver	Alyson Ackman; Samantha Cheverton; Brittany MacLean; Emily Overholt	Swimming	4 × 200 m freestyle relay	July 26
Silver	Emily Batty	Cycling	Women's cross-country	July 29
Silver	James Paton	Shooting	Queen's prize individual	July 29
Silver	Jessica Zelinka	Athletics	Heptathlon	July 30
Silver	Jennifer Abel; Pamela Ware	Diving	Women's 3 m synchronised springboard	July 30
Silver	Scott Morgan	Gymnastics	Men's floor	July 31
Silver	Ellie Black	Gymnastics	Women's vault	July 31
Silver	Brittanee Laverdure	Wrestling	Women's freestyle 55 kg	July 31
Silver	Jevon Balfour	Wrestling	Men's freestyle 65 kg	July 31
Silver	Kevin Lytwyn	Gymnastics	Men's rings	July 31
Silver	Diane Roy	Athletics	Women's 1500 metres (T54)	July 31
Silver	Ryan Bester	Lawn bowls	Men's Singles	August 1
Silver	Jennifer Abel	Diving	Women's 3 m springboard	August 2
Silver	Ariane Fortin	Boxing	Women's middleweight	August 2
Bronze	Alyson Ackman; Sandrine Mainville; Michelle Williams; Victoria Poon	Swimming	4 × 100 m freestyle relay	July 24
Bronze	Dorothy Ludwig	Shooting	10 metre air pistol	July 25
Bronze	Alix Renaud-Roy	Judo	Women's 70 kg	July 25
Bronze	Jonah Burt	Judo	Men's 81 kg	July 25
Bronze	Patricia Bezzoubenko	Gymnastics	Rhythmic individual ribbon	July 26
Bronze	Ana Laura Portuondo Isasi	Judo	Women's 78 kg	July 26
Bronze	Rémi Pelletier-Roy	Cycling	Men's scratch race	July 27
Bronze	Hilary Caldwell	Swimming	Women's 200 metre backstroke	July 27
Bronze	Marie-Josée Arès-Pilon	Weightlifting	Women's 69 kg	July 28
Bronze	Brittany MacLean	Swimming	800 m freestyle	July 28
Bronze	Tim Nedow	Athletics	Shot put	July 28
Bronze	Pascal Plamondon	Weightlifting	Men's 85 kg	July 28
Bronze	Jasmine Mian	Wrestling	Women's freestyle 48 kg	July 29
Bronze	Nathan Gafuik; Scott Morgan; Anderson Loran; Kevin Lytwyn; Zachary Clay	Gymnastics	Team	July 29
Bronze	Brooklynn Snodgrass	Swimming	50 m backstroke	July 29
Bronze	Aurélie Rivard	Swimming	200 metre individual medley SM10	July 29
Bronze	Kate Van Buskirk	Athletics	Women's 1500 metres	July 29
Bronze	Sandrine Mainville; Sinead Russell; Katerine Savard*; Tera van Beilen; Audrey Lacroix; Michelle Williams*; Kierra Smith*	Swimming	4 × 100 m medley relay	July 29
Bronze	Jillian Gallays	Wrestling	Women's freestyle 53 kg	July 30
Bronze	Braxton Stone-Papadopoulos	Wrestling	Women's freestyle 58 kg	July 30
Bronze	Michael Mason	Athletics	Men's High jump	July 30
Bronze	Julie Labonté	Athletics	Women's Shot put	July 30
Bronze	Alexandre Dupont	Athletics	Men's 1500 metres (T54)	July 31
Bronze	Christabel Nettey	Athletics	Women's long jump	July 31
Bronze	Roseline Filion	Diving	Women's 10 m platform	July 31
Bronze	Mandy Bujold	Boxing	Women's flyweight	August 1
Bronze	Ellie Black	Gymnastics	Women's floor	August 1
Bronze	Kevin Lytwyn	Gymnastics	Men's horizontal bar	August 1
Bronze	Shawnacy Barber	Athletics	Men's Pole vault	August 1
Bronze	Cameron Levins	Athletics	Men's 10,000 m	August 1
Bronze	Angela Whyte	Athletics	Women's 100 metres hurdles	August 1
Bronze	Anqi Luo; Zhang Mo	Table Tennis	Women's doubles	August 2
Bronze	Alysha Newman	Athletics	Women's Pole vault	August 2
Bronze	Vincent Riendeau	Diving	Men's 10 m platform	August 2

Medals by sport
Sport	1st place, gold medalist(s)	2nd place, silver medalist(s)	3rd place, bronze medalist(s)	Total
Gymnastics	8	3	4	15
Wrestling	7	2	3	12
Athletics	5	2	10	17
Swimming	4	1	6	11
Diving	3	2	2	7
Weightlifting	2	0	2	4
Boxing	1	1	1	3
Cycling	1	1	1	3
Badminton	1	0	0	1
Shooting	0	2	1	3
Lawn bowls	0	1	0	1
Triathlon	0	1	0	1
Judo	0	0	3	3
Table tennis	0	0	1	1
Total	32	16	34	82

Medals by day
Day	1st place, gold medalist(s)	2nd place, silver medalist(s)	3rd place, bronze medalist(s)	Total
24 July	2	1	1	4
25 July	2	0	3	5
26 July	3	2	2	7
27 July	0	0	2	2
28 July	2	0	4	6
29 July	7	2	6	15
30 July	6	2	4	12
31 July	5	6	3	14
1 August	3	1	6	10
2 August	1	2	3	6
3 August	1	0	0	1
Total	32	16	34	82

* – Indicates the athlete competed in preliminaries but not the final

== Athletics ==
On June 4, 2014 Athletics Canada nominated fifty athletes to the team. Two athletes Alysha Newman (ranked second in the Commonwealth) and James Steacy (ranked first) did not meet the qualification standard but were still nominated to the team. All other athletes met the qualification standard for their events. The team finished the games with a total medal count of seventeen medals, including five gold. The seventeen medals represents a tie for the most medals won by the country in the sport at the Commonwealth Games.

Key

- Note–Ranks given for track events are for the entire round
- Q = Qualified for the next round
- q = Qualified for the next round as a fastest loser or, in field events, by position without achieving the qualifying target
- NR = National record
- GR = Games record
- PB = Personal best
- DNF = Did not finish
- NM = No mark
- N/A = Round not applicable for the event
- Bye = Athlete not required to compete in round

Men

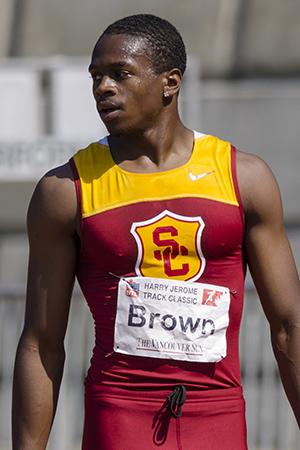
Aaron Brown represented Canada in two events.

Athlete	Event	Round 1		Semifinal		Final	
Athlete	Event	Result	Rank	Result	Rank	Result	Rank
Aaron Brown	100 m	10.39	=19 q	10.17	6	did not advance	
Jared Connaughton	100 m	10.47	27	did not advance			
Dontae Richards-Kwok	100 m	10.36	17 q	10.42	23	did not advance	
Andre De Grasse	200 m	20.56	=2 Q	20.73	15	did not advance	
Brendon Rodney	200 m	20.77	14 Q	20.89	18	did not advance	
Gavin Smellie	200 m	20.74	=12 Q	20.54	=7 q	20.55	8
Daundre Barnaby	400 m	46.16	11 Q	46.28	13	did not advance	
Philip Osei	400 m	47.11	26 Q	47.16	19	did not advance	
Michael Robertson	400 m	46.87	21 q	47.30	20	did not advance	
Brandon McBride	800 m	1:49.29	11 q	DQ		did not advance	
Josh Cassidy	1500 metres (T54)	3:29.81	5 Q	—N/a		3:27.34	6
Alexandre Dupont	1500 metres (T54)	3:20.14	2 Q	—N/a		3:23.62	3rd place, bronze medalist(s)
Mohammed Ahmed	5000 metres	—N/a				13:18:88 PB	5
Mohammed Ahmed	10000 m	—N/a				28:02.96	6
Cameron Levins	10000 m	—N/a				27:56.23	3rd place, bronze medalist(s)
Matthew Hughes	3,000 metres steeplechase	—N/a				8:21.88	4
Taylor Milne	3,000 metres steeplechase	—N/a				DQ	
Chris Winter	3,000 metres steeplechase	—N/a				8:29.83	6
Aaron Brown; Andre De Grasse; Dontae Richards-Kwok; Gavin Smellie	4 x 100 metres relay	38.41	2 Q	—N/a		DNF	
Daundre Barnaby; Philip Osei; Michael Robertson; Brendon Rodney	4 x 400 metres relay	DQ		—N/a		did not advance	

Field events

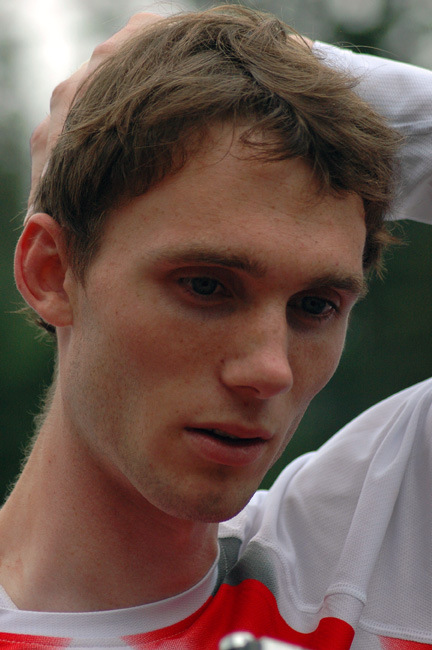
Michael Mason won a bronze medal in the high jump event.

Athlete	Event	Qualification		Final	
Athlete	Event	Distance	Position	Distance	Position
Derek Drouin	High jump	2.20	1 q	2.31	1st place, gold medalist(s)
Michael Mason	High jump	2.20	1 q	2.25	3rd place, bronze medalist(s)
Shawnacy Barber	Pole vault	—N/a		5.45	3rd place, bronze medalist(s)
Tim Nedow	Shot put	19.84	4 q	20.59	3rd place, bronze medalist(s)
Justin Rodhe	Shot put	19.14	7 q	NM	–
James Steacy	Hammer throw	70.62	4 Q	74.16	1st place, gold medalist(s)

Combined events – Decathlon

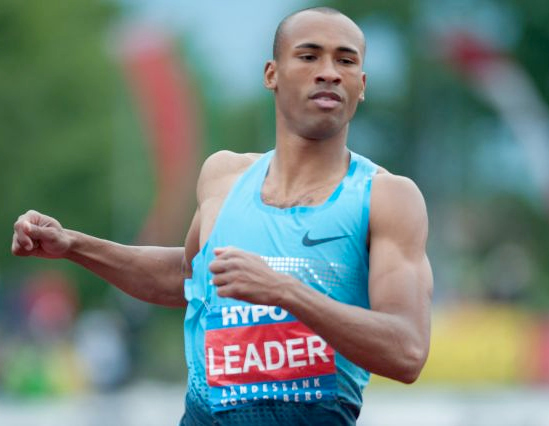
Damian Warner won the gold medal in the decathlon.

Athlete	Event	100 m	LJ	SP	HJ	400 m	110H	DT	PV	JT	1500 m	Final	Rank
Damian Warner	Result	10.29 GR	7.50	14.04	1.96	47.78	13.50 GR	41.31	4.50	61.96	4:45.43	8282	1st place, gold medalist(s)
Damian Warner	Points	1025	935	731	767	920	1040	691	760	767	646	8282	1st place, gold medalist(s)

Women

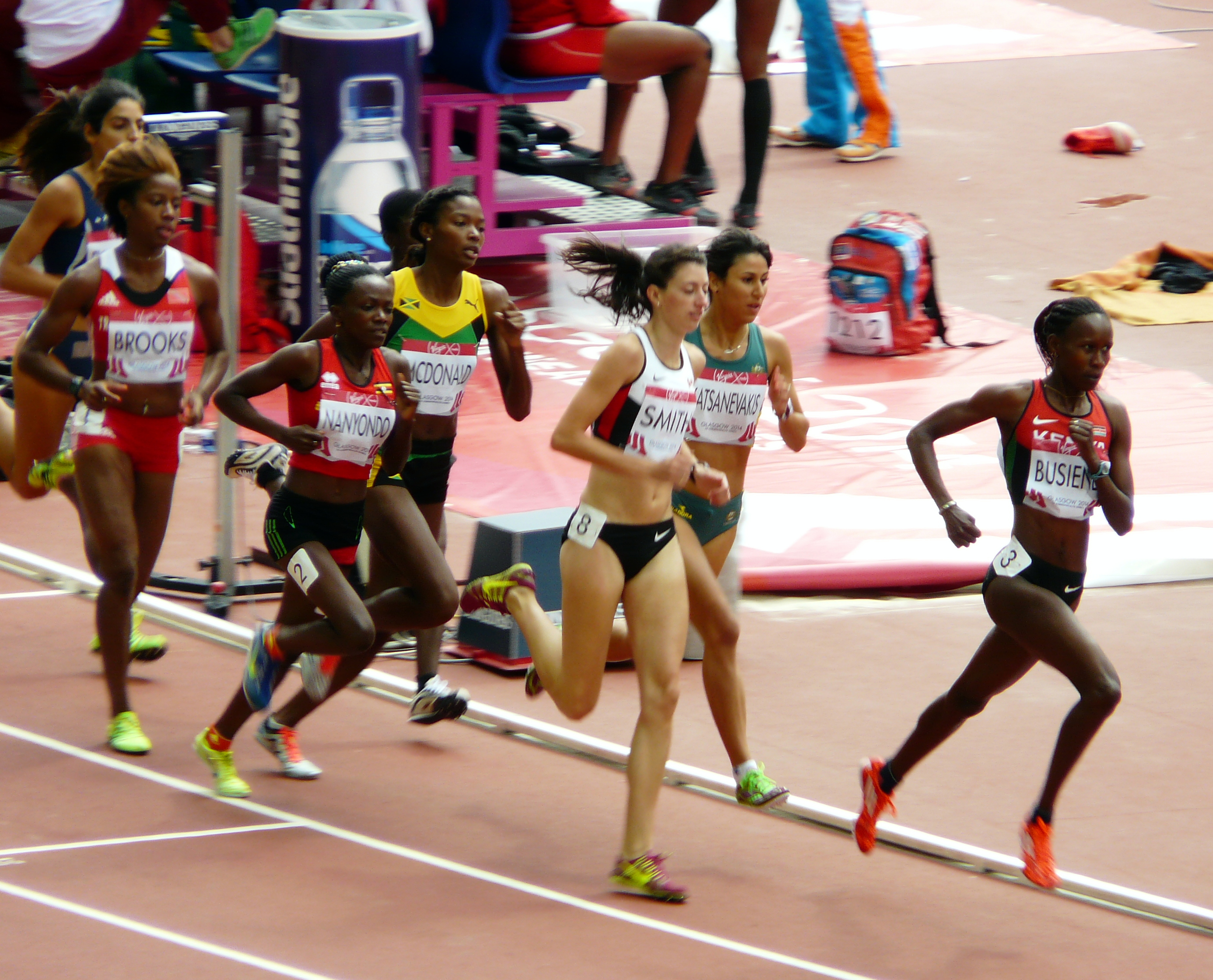
Jessica Smith (pictured third from the right) competes in her first round heat in the 800 metres event.

Athlete	Event	Round 1		Semifinal		Final	
Athlete	Event	Result	Rank	Result	Rank	Result	Rank
Khamica Bingham	100 m	11.44	7 Q	11.32 PB	7 q	11.37	7
Shai-Anne Davis	100 m	11.72	20 Q	11.52	12	did not advance	
Crystal Emmanuel	100 m	11.64	14 Q	11.43	9	did not advance	
Shai-Anne Davis	200 m	23.51	12 Q	23.48	12	did not advance	
Crystal Emmanuel	200 m	23.54	13 Q	23.46	11	did not advance	
Kimberly Hyacinthe	200 m	23.29	8 Q	23.14	6 q	23.11	7
Audrey Jean-Baptiste	400 m	54.15	19 q	53.61	19	did not advance	
Wendy Fawn Dorr	400 m	55.33	30	did not advance			
Karine Belleau-Béliveau	800 m	2:03.98	14	did not advance			
Melissa Bishop	800 m	2:01.72	1 Q	2:01.86	2 Q	2:02.61	8
Jessica Smith	800 m	2:05.22	16 Q	2:04.42	13	did not advance	
Nicole Sifuentes	1500 metres	4:06.61	8 q	—N/a		4:10.48	4
Kate Van Buskirk	1500 metres	4:07.74	9 Q	—N/a		4:09.41	3rd place, bronze medalist(s)
Diane Roy	1500 metres (T54)	3:52.83	1 Q	—N/a		3:59.55	2nd place, silver medalist(s)
Jessica O'Connell	5000 metres	—N/a				15:45.33	10
Angela Whyte	100 metres hurdles	13.33	5 Q	—N/a		13.02	3rd place, bronze medalist(s)
Phylicia George	100 metres hurdles	13.66	15	—N/a		did not advance	
Noelle Montcalm	400 metres hurdles	56.72	6 q	—N/a		56.74	5
Chanice Chase	400 metres hurdles	57.23	8 Q	—N/a		DNF	
Khamica Bingham; Crystal Emmanuel; Phylicia George; Kimberly Hyacinthe	4 x 100 metres relay	43.66	3 Q	—N/a		43.33	4
Audrey Jean-Baptiste; Wendy Fawn Dorr; Noelle Montcalm; Chanice Chase	4 x 400 metres relay	3:31.02	4 Q	—N/a		3:32.45	5
Lanni Marchant	Marathon	—N/a				2:31:14	4

Field events

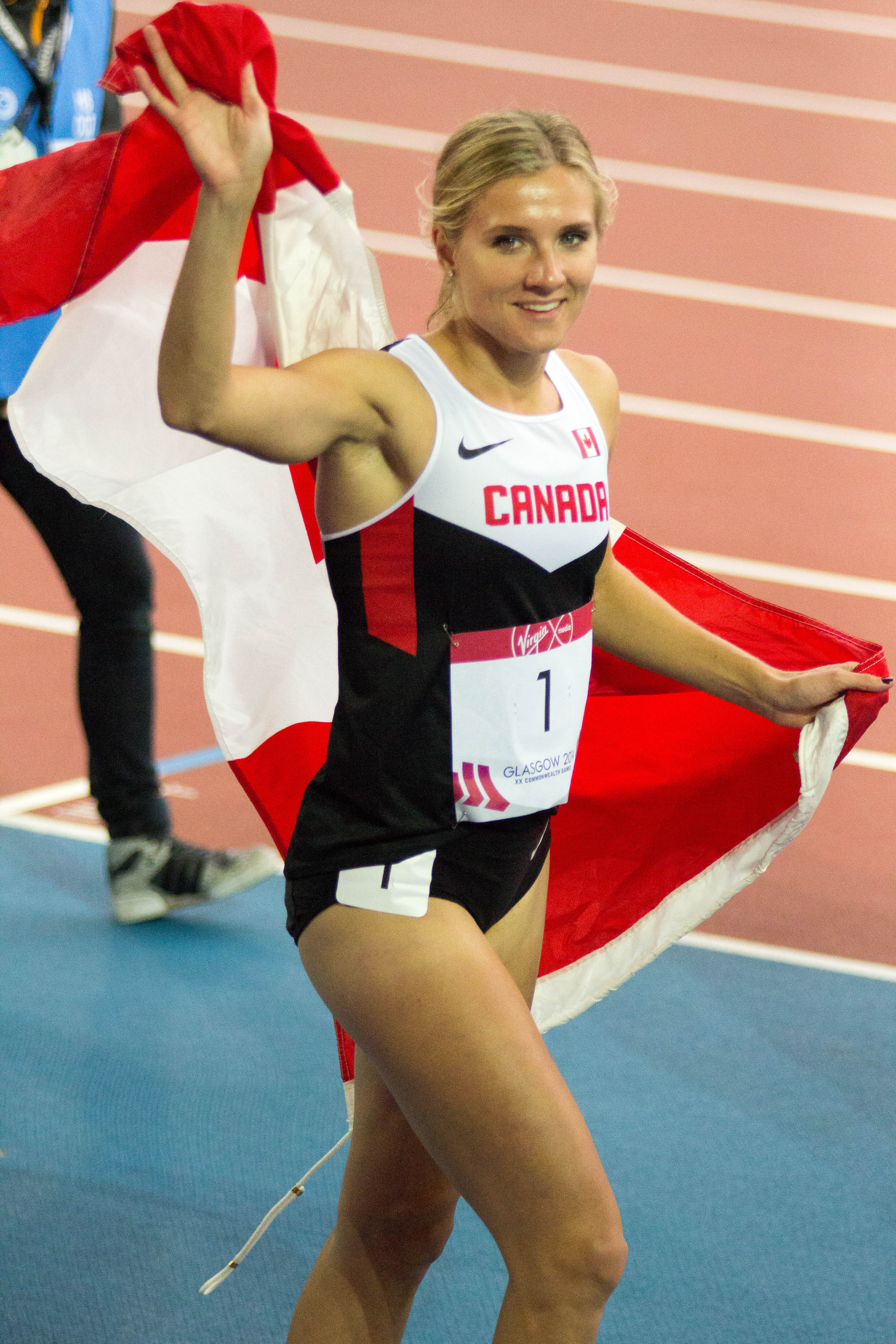
Brianne Theisen-Eaton, pictured after she won the gold medal in the heptathlon event.

Athlete	Event	Qualification		Final	
Athlete	Event	Distance	Position	Distance	Position
Alysha Newman	Pole vault	—N/a		3.80	3rd place, bronze medalist(s)
Sultana Frizell	Hammer throw	68.92 GR	1 Q	71.97 GR	1st place, gold medalist(s)
Elizabeth Gleadle	Javelin throw	—N/a		60.59	5
Julie Labonté	Discus throw	50.32	12 q	52.30	12
Julie Labonté	Shot put	—N/a		17.58	3rd place, bronze medalist(s)
Christabel Nettey	Long jump	6.47	5 q	6.49	3rd place, bronze medalist(s)

Combined events – Heptathlon

Athlete	Event	100H	HJ	SP	200 m	LJ	JT	800 m	Final	Rank
Brianne Theisen-Eaton	Result	13.81	1.84	13.71	23.41 GR	6.44	43.13	2:11.46	6597	1st place, gold medalist(s)
Brianne Theisen-Eaton	Points	1097	1029	775	1038	988	727	943	6597	1st place, gold medalist(s)
Jessica Zelinka	Result	12.83	1.69	13.65	24.00	5.91	44.90	2:11.54	6270	2nd place, silver medalist(s)
Jessica Zelinka	Points	1150	842	771	981	822	762	942	6270	2nd place, silver medalist(s)

== Badminton ==
On May 8, 2014, Badminton Canada named a team of eight athletes. The team won one medal, a gold by Michelle Li. The medal was the first individual badminton title for Canada at the Commonwealth Games.

Singles

Athlete	Event	Round of 64	Round of 32	Round of 16	Quarterfinals	Semifinals	Final	
Athlete	Event	Opposition Score	Opposition Score	Opposition Score	Opposition Score	Opposition Score	Opposition Score	Rank
Andrew D'Souza	Men's Singles	Mbogo (KEN); W 21–11, 21–10	Donkor (GHA); W 21–12, 21–16	Dutt (IND); L 13–21, 9–21	did not advance			
Rachel Honderich	Women's Singles	Tekeiaki (KIR); W W/O	Pasturel (JER); W 21–7, 21–14	Thulasi (IND); L 12–21, 7–21	did not advance			
Michelle Li	Women's Singles	Bye	Bashir (PAK); W 21–9, 21–4	Liang (SIN); W 21–16, 21–16	Walker (ENG); W 21–18, 21–18	Sindhu (IND); W 22–20, 22–20	Gilmour (SCO); W 21–14, 21–7	1st place, gold medalist(s)

Doubles

Athlete	Event	Round of 64	Round of 32	Round of 16	Quarterfinals	Semifinals	Final	
Athlete	Event	Opposition Score	Opposition Score	Opposition Score	Opposition Score	Opposition Score	Opposition Score	Rank
Adrian Liu; Derrick Ng	Men's Doubles	Bye	Donkor / Sam (GHA); W 21–7, 21–12	Blair / Van Rietvelde (SCO); L 18–21, 13–21	did not advance			
Andrew D'Souza; Toby Ng	Men's Doubles	Bye	Shem / Kiong (MAS); L 18–21, 16–21	did not advance				
Alex Bruce; Phyllis Chan	Women's Doubles	—N/a	Martins / Joseph (KEN); W 21–6, 21–8	Turner / Thomas (WAL); W 23–21, 21–13	Smith / Adcock (ENG); L 9–21, 10–21	did not advance		
Toby Ng; Alex Bruce	Mixed Doubles	Bye	Padmore / Watson (BAR); W 21–13, 21–10	Stephenson / Black (NIR); W 21–17, 21–13	Langridge / Olver (ENG); L 16–21, 17–21	did not advance		
Derrick Ng; Phyllis Chan	Mixed Doubles	Bye	Chambers / Chambers (NIR); W 21–13, 21–12	Malan / Fry (RSA); W 21–7, 21–9	Blair / Bankier (SCO); L 11–21, 17–21	did not advance		
Adrian Liu; Michelle Li	Mixed Doubles	Bye	Chrisnanta / Neo (SIN); L 13–21, 8–21	did not advance				

Mixed team

Pool D

Pos	Team	Pld	W	L	GF	GA	GD	PF	PA	PD	Pts	Qualification
1	Canada	3	3	0	25	6	+19	626	386	+240	3	Quarterfinals
2	Australia	3	2	1	23	8	+15	596	412	+184	2	Quarterfinals
3	Wales	3	1	2	14	18	−4	556	494	+62	1	
4	Falkland Islands	3	0	3	0	30	−30	144	630	−486	0	

Source: glasgow2014.com

Canada
5
Commonwealth Arena, Glasgow
24 July

Falkland Islands
0

			1	2	3
1	(Canada) (Falkland Islands)	Adrian Liu / Derrick Ng; Dominic Jaffray / Christopher Eynon	21; 6	21; 5
2	(Canada) (Falkland Islands)	Michelle Li; Laura Minto	21; 4	21; 2
3	(Canada) (Falkland Islands)	Andrew D'Souza; Douglas Clark	21; 3	21; 7
4	(Canada) (Falkland Islands)	Alex Bruce / Phyllis Chan; Sofia Arkhipkina / Anna Luxton	21; 0	21; 4
5	(Canada) (Falkland Islands)	Toby Ng / Rachel Honderich; Ross Stewart / Laura Minto	21; 7	21; 5

Canada
4
Commonwealth Arena, Glasgow
25 July

Wales
1

			1	2	3
1	(Canada) (Wales)	Toby Ng / Alex Bruce; Sarah Thomas / Oliver Gwilt	21; 9	21; 12
2	(Canada) (Wales)	Andrew D'Souza; Daniel Font	21; 17	21; 15
3	(Canada) (Wales)	Michelle Li; Carissa Turner	21; 14	21; 14
4	(Canada) (Wales)	Adrian Liu / Derrick Ng; Joe Morgan / Nicolas Strange	27; 25	21; 14
5	(Canada) (Wales)	Alex Bruce / Phyllis Chan; Sarah Thomas / Carissa Turner	16; 21	21; 14	18; 21

Australia
2
Commonwealth Arena, Glasgow
25 July

Canada
3

			1	2	3
1	(Australia) (Canada)	Ross Smith / Renuga Veeran; Toby Ng / Alex Bruce	21; 11	21; 17
2	(Australia) (Canada)	Jeff Tho; Andrew D'Souza	10; 21	8; 21
3	(Australia) (Canada)	Verdet Kessler; Michelle Li	16; 21	13; 21
4	(Australia) (Canada)	Ross Smith / Robin Middleton; Adrian Liu / Derrick Ng	21; 11	21; 17
5	(Australia) (Canada)	Renuga Veeran / He Tian Tang; Michelle Li / Rachel Honderich	24; 26	12; 21

Quarterfinals

Canada
1
Commonwealth Arena, Glasgow
26 July

India
3

			1	2	3
1	(Canada) (India)	Toby Ng / Alex Bruce; Srikanth Kidambi / Jwala Gutta	19; 21	21; 17	18; 21
2	(Canada) (India)	Andrew D'Souza; Kashyap Parupalli	11; 21	9; 21
3	(Canada) (India)	Michelle Li; P. V. Sindhu	15; 21	22; 20	21; 17
4	(Canada) (India)	Adrian Liu / Derrick Ng; Pranav Chopra / Akshay Dewalkar	15; 21	21; 19	13; 21

== Boxing ==
On June 11, 2014 Boxing Canada named its team of five male and two female athletes. The team finished with three medals, including one gold. Both women on the team won medals. The result marked an improvement of zero medals being won in 2010.

Athlete	Event	Round of 32	Round of 16	Quarterfinals	Semifinals	Final	
Athlete	Event	Opposition Result	Opposition Result	Opposition Result	Opposition Result	Opposition Result	Rank
David Gauthier	Men's lightweight	Bye	Cordina (WAL); L 0–3	did not advance			
Arthur Biyarslanov	Men's light welterweight	Lawson (GHA); W 2–1	Kumar (IND); L 1–2	did not advance			
Custio Clayton	Men's welterweight	Francois (GRN); W 3–0	Heild (BAH); W 3–0	Donnelly (NIR); L 0–3	did not advance		
Brody Blair	Men's middleweight	Bangura (SLE); W 2–1	Muziyo (ZAM); L TKO	did not advance			
Samir El Mais	Men's heavyweight	—N/a	Bye	Baister (ENG); W 2–1	Apochi (NGR); W 3–0	Light (NZL); W 2–1	1st place, gold medalist(s)
Mandy Bujold	Women's flyweight	—N/a	Bye	Harris (AUS); W 3–0	Adams (ENG); L 0–3	Did not advance	3rd place, bronze medalist(s)
Ariane Fortin	Women's middleweight	—N/a	Thingana (RSA); W 3–0	Maka (NZL); W 3–0	Price (WAL); W 2–0	Marshall (ENG); L 1–2	2nd place, silver medalist(s)

== Cycling ==
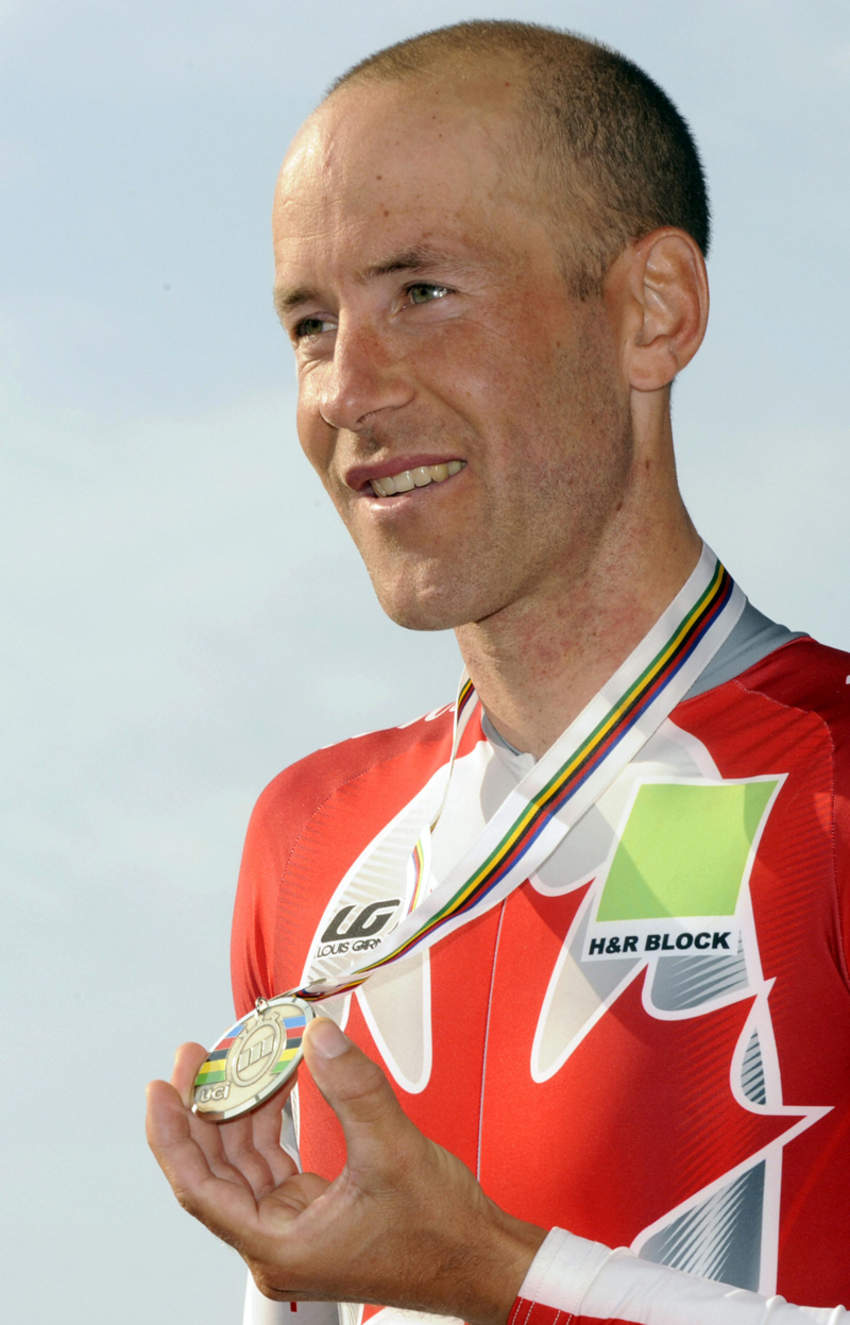
Svein Tuft represented Canada in the men's road race and time trial.

On June 6, 2014, Cycling Canada named its team of sixteen athletes. On June 26, 2014, Cycling Canada added a further two athletes (for a total of 18) after Commonwealth Games Canada notified the organization they would be able to do, provided they were medal contenders. The athletes added are former World Championship medalist Svein Tuft and Will Routley. Canada's cycling team won a total of three medals: two in mountain biking and one in track cycling. The road cycling team won no medals.

=== Mountain biking ===
Athlete	Event	Time	Rank
Raphaël Gagné	Men's cross-country	1:43:03	7
Max Plaxton	Men's cross-country	1:38.49	4
Emily Batty	Women's cross-country	1:40:39	2nd place, silver medalist(s)
Catharine Pendrel	Women's cross-country	1:39:29	1st place, gold medalist(s)

=== Road ===
Men

Athlete	Event	Time	Rank
Zach Bell	Road race	DNF	
Zach Bell	Time trial	52:15.38	14
Nic Hamilton	Road race	DNF	
Will Routely	Road race	DNF	
Rémi Pelletier-Roy	Road race	DNF	
Svein Tuft	Road race	DNF	
Svein Tuft	Time trial	48:33.24	4
Ed Veal	Road race	DNF	

Women

Athlete	Event	Time	Rank
Laura Brown	Road race	DNF	
Laura Brown	Time trial	46:35.77	16
Jasmin Glaesser	Road race	2:51.00	25
Jasmin Glaesser	Time trial	44:12.64	10
Leah Kirchmann	Road race	2:44.12	10
Leah Kirchmann	Time trial	49:05.24	24
Stephanie Roorda	Road race	DNF	

=== Track ===
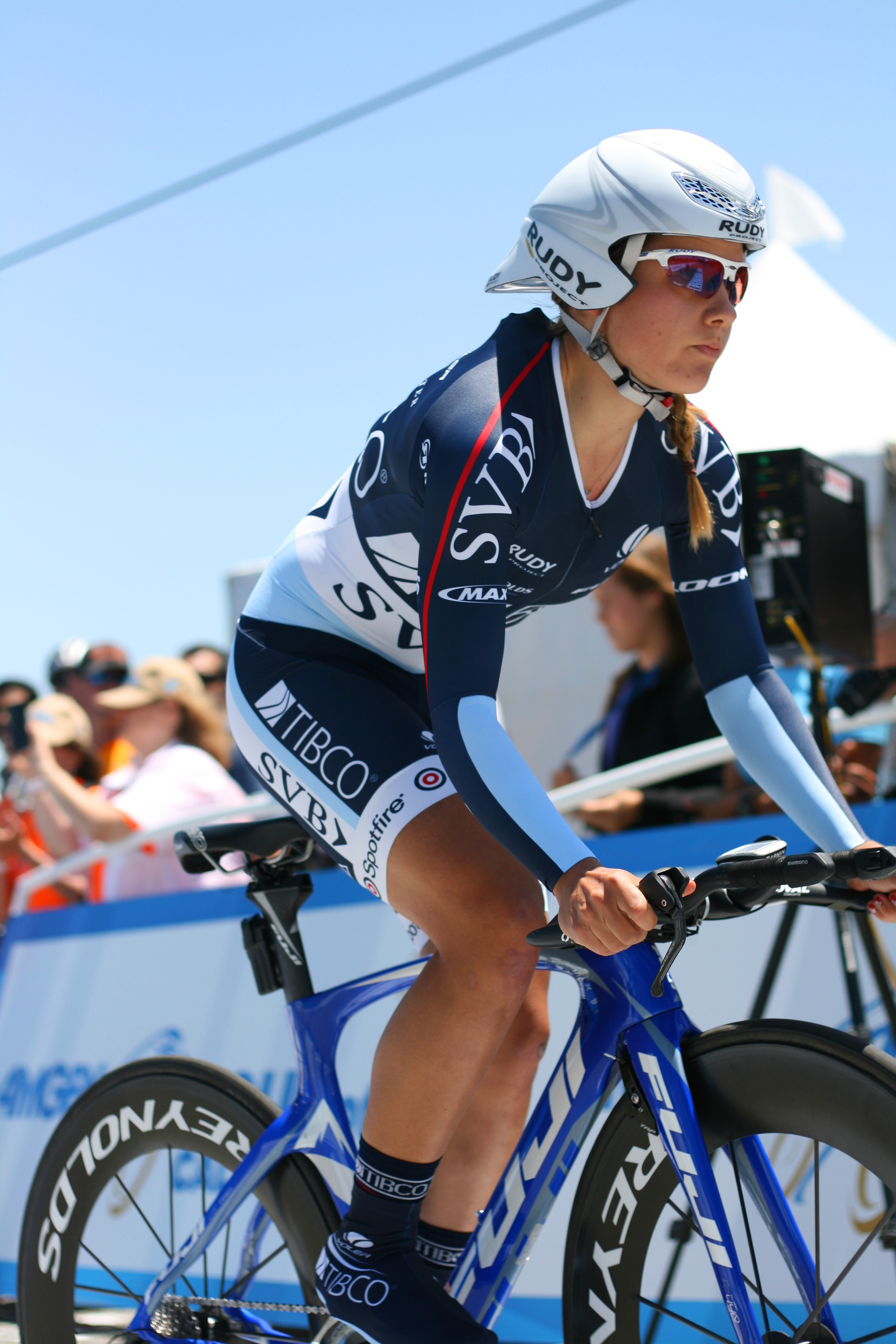
Jasmin Glaesser represented Canada in both road and track cycling.

Keirin

Athlete	Event	1st round	Repechage	2nd round	Final
Athlete	Event	Rank	Rank	Rank	Rank
Hugo Barrette	Men's keirin	4 R	1 Q	5	7
Vincent De Haître	Men's keirin	5 R	3	did not advance	
Joseph Veloce	Men's keirin	4 R	2	did not advance	

Points Race

Athlete	Event	Qualification		Final	
Athlete	Event	Points	Rank	Points	Rank
Zach Bell	Men's points race	20	5 Q	43	5
Aidan Caves	Men's points race	4	10 Q	did not finish	
Rémi Pelletier-Roy	Men's points race	11	4 Q	did not finish	
Laura Brown	Women's points race	—N/a	—N/a	6	10
Jasmin Glaesser	Women's points race	—N/a	—N/a	28	6
Stephanie Roorda	Women's points race	—N/a	—N/a	1	13

Pursuit

Athlete	Event	Qualification		Final	
Athlete	Event	Time	Rank	Opponent results	Rank
Rémi Pelletier-Roy	Men's individual pursuit	4:28.525	9	did not advance	
Ed Veal	Men's individual pursuit	4:33.775	12	did not advance	
Laura Brown	Women's individual pursuit	3:40.035	10	did not advance	
Jasmin Glaesser	Women's individual pursuit	3:40.050	11	did not advance	
Stephanie Roorda	Women's individual pursuit	3:42.924	14	did not advance	
Zach Bell; Aidan Caves; Rémi Pelletier-Roy; Ed Veal	Men's team pursuit	4:14.481	4	New Zealand; L OVL	4

Scratch

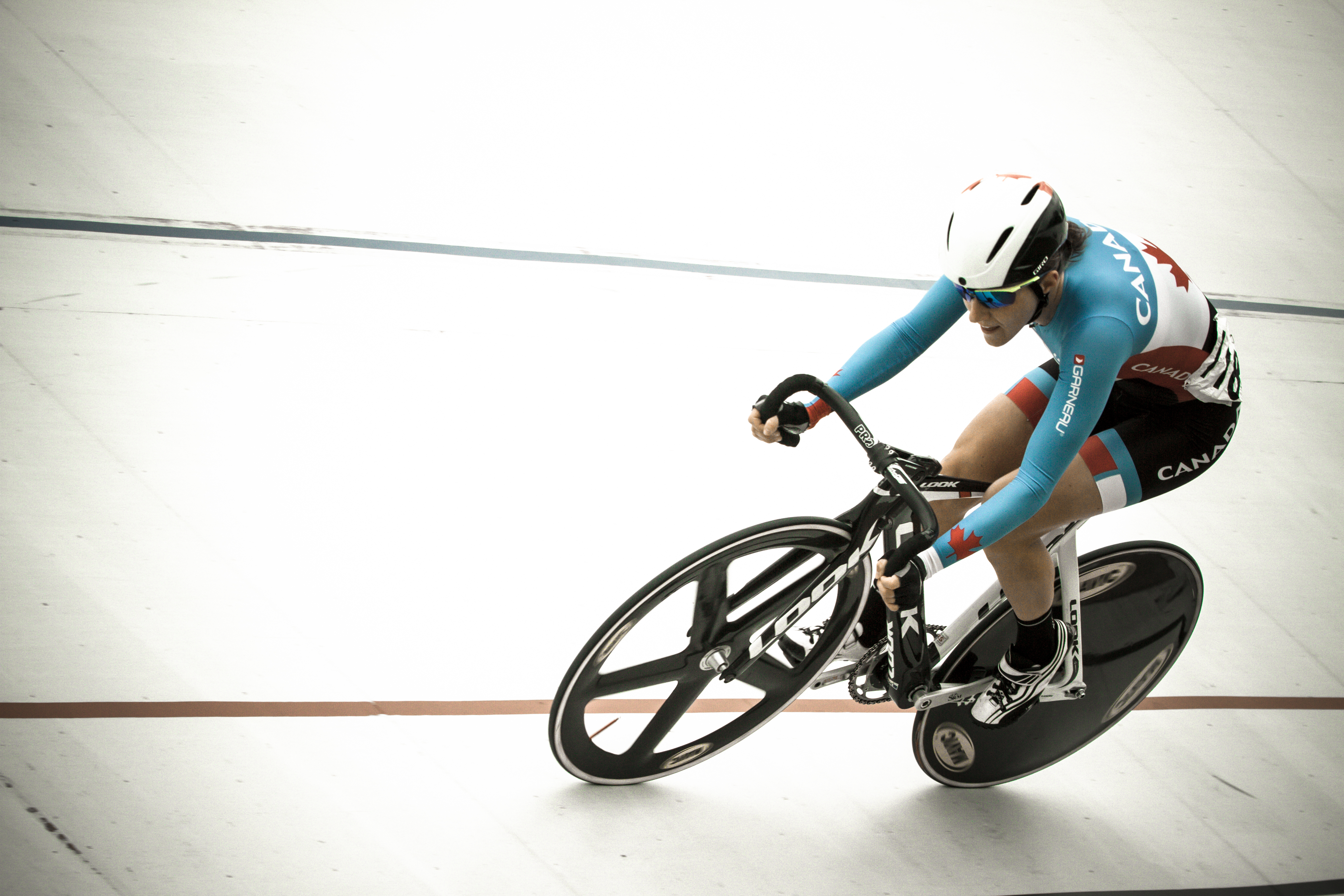
Laura Brown also competed in both the track and road disciplines.

Athlete	Event	Qualification	Final
Athlete	Event	Rank	Rank
Zach Bell	Men's scratch	3 Q	10
Aidan Caves	Men's scratch	8 Q	DNF
Rémi Pelletier-Roy	Men's scratch	9 Q	3rd place, bronze medalist(s)
Laura Brown	Women's scratch	—N/a	18
Jasmin Glaesser	Women's scratch	—N/a	10
Stephanie Roorda	Women's scratch	—N/a	16

Sprint

Athlete	Event	Qualification		Round 1	Repechage 1	Round 2	Repechage 2	Quarterfinals	Semifinals	Final	
Athlete	Event	Time Speed (km/h)	Rank	Opposition Time Speed (km/h)	Opposition Time Speed (km/h)	Opposition Time Speed (km/h)	Opposition Time Speed (km/h)	Opposition Time Speed (km/h)	Opposition Time Speed (km/h)	Opposition Time Speed (km/h)	Rank
Hugo Barrette	Men's sprint	10.316; 69.794	15	did not advance							
Vincent De Haître	Men's sprint	10.411; 69.157	17	did not advance							
Joseph Veloce	Men's sprint	10.428; 69.044	19	did not advance							

Team sprint

Athlete	Event	Qualification		Final	
Athlete	Event	Time Speed (km/h)	Rank	Opposition Time Speed (km/h)	Rank
Hugo Barrette; Vincent De Haître; Joseph Veloce	Men's team sprint	45.302	4	Australia; L 45.054	4

Time trial

Athlete	Event	Time	Rank
Vincent De Haître	Men's time trial	1:03.317	7

== Diving ==
On June 17, 2014, Diving Canada nominated eleven athletes to the team. Canadian divers finished the Games with seven medals one less than four years ago.

Men

Athlete	Events	Semifinal		Final	
Athlete	Events	Points	Rank	Points	Rank
Maxim Bouchard	10 m platform	441.50	3 Q	399.20	5
François Imbeau-Dulac	1 m springboard	313.20	11 Q	326.70	12
François Imbeau-Dulac	3 m springboard	406.35	3 Q	402.70	7
Riley McCormick	1 m springboard	326.20	9 Q	374.10	8
Riley McCormick	3 m springboard	403.10	4 Q	413.40	4
Vincent Riendeau	10 m platform	440.10	4 Q	429.25	3rd place, bronze medalist(s)
Cody Yano	1 m springboard	312.00	12 Q	327.90	11
Cody Yano	3 m springboard	364.35	12 Q	375.85	9
Maxim Bouchard; Riley McCormick	3 m synchronised springboard	—N/a		345.78	5
Maxim Bouchard; Vincent Riendeau	10 m synchronised platform	—N/a		384.30	4

Women

Athlete	Events	Semifinal		Final	
Athlete	Events	Points	Rank	Points	Rank
Jennifer Abel	1 m springboard	264.50	5 Q	287.25	1st place, gold medalist(s)
Jennifer Abel	3 m springboard	336.90	1 Q	324.70	2nd place, silver medalist(s)
Meaghan Benfeito	10 m platform	318.45	3 Q	372.65	1st place, gold medalist(s)
Emma Friesen	1 m springboard	249.25	9 Q	249.40	11
Emma Friesen	3 m springboard	194.40	13	did not advance	
Roseline Filion	10 m platform	348.80	=1 Q	361.80	3rd place, bronze medalist(s)
Carol-Ann Ware	10 m platform	261.15	11 Q	320.80	7
Pamela Ware	1 m springboard	278.40	2 Q	265.10	6
Pamela Ware	3 m springboard	289.45	9 Q	308.10	6
Jennifer Abel; Pamela Ware	3 m synchronised springboard	—N/a		295.65	2nd place, silver medalist(s)
Meaghan Benfeito; Roseline Filion	10 m synchronised platform	—N/a		310.65	1st place, gold medalist(s)

== Field hockey ==
=== Men's tournament ===
On July 2, 2014 Field Hockey Canada nominated 16 athletes to the team. The team finished in sixth place, tying it for the highest placement with the 2006 team.

Roster

- David Carter
- Taylor Curran
- Adam Froese
- Matthew Guest
- Richard Hildreth
- Gabriel Ho-Garcia
- David Jameson
- Gordon Johnston
- Benjamin Martin
- Sukhpal Panesar
- Mark Pearson
- Keegan Pereira
- Iain Smythe
- Scott Tupper (C)
- Paul Wharton
- Philip Wright

Pool B

Team	Pld	W	D	L	GF	GA	GD	Pts	Qualification
New Zealand	4	4	0	0	19	3	+16	12	Semi-finals
England	4	3	0	1	18	5	+13	9	Semi-finals
Canada	4	1	0	3	5	9	−4	3	
Malaysia	4	1	0	3	6	18	−12	3	
Trinidad and Tobago	4	1	0	3	6	19	−13	3	

Source: FIH

24 July 2014
21:00

New Zealand	3–1	Canada
Hayward 3'; Panchia 58'; A. Shaw 64'	Report	Panesar 20'

Umpires:
Martin Madden (SCO)
Eric Koh (MAS)

26 July 2014
11:00

Malaysia	2–0	Canada
Nasruddin 15'; Tajuddin 69'	Report

Umpires:
Peter Wright (RSA)
Dan Barstow (ENG)

27 July 2014
19:00

Canada	3–1	Trinidad and Tobago
Tupper 28'; Pearson 44'; Jameson 60'	Report	Browne 57'

Umpires:
Lim Hong Zhen (SIN)
Haider Rasool (PAK)

31 July 2014
09:00

England	3–1	Canada
Jackson 25', 54'; Middleton 36'	Report	Tupper 68'

Umpires:
Martin Madden (SCO)
Eric Koh (MAS)

Fifth place match

2 August 2014
14:30

South Africa	7–3	Canada
Norris-Jones 7', 68'; Drummond 33'; Smith 49'; Paton 57'; Halkett 62'; Hykes 66'	Report	Curran 17'; Smythe 28'; Johnston 37'

Umpires:
Will Drury (WAL)
Haider Rasool (PAK)

=== Women's tournament ===
On July 2, 2014 Field Hockey Canada nominated 16 athletes to the team. The women's team finished the tournament in eighth place out of ten teams.

Roster

- Jessica Barnett
- Thea Culley
- Kate Gillis (C)
- Hannah Haughn
- Danielle Hennig
- Karli Johansen
- Lauren Logush
- Sara McManus
- Abigail Raye
- Poonam Sandhu
- Maddie Secco
- Brienne Stairs
- Holly Stewart
- Kaelan Watson
- Kaitlyn Williams
- Kristine Wishart

Pool A

Team	Pld	W	D	L	GF	GA	GD	Pts	Qualification
New Zealand	4	4	0	0	25	1	+24	12	Semi-finals
South Africa	4	3	0	1	22	4	+18	9	Semi-finals
India	4	2	0	2	20	8	+12	6	
Canada	4	1	0	3	6	13	−7	3	
Trinidad and Tobago	4	0	0	4	1	48	−47	0	

24 July 2014
16:00

India	4–2	Canada
Rampal 22'; Rani 29'; J. Kaur 38', 53'	Report	Stairs 25'; Johansen 46'

Umpires:
Kylie Seymour (AUS)
Hannah Sanders (ENG)

25 July 2014
21:00

South Africa	2–0	Canada
Chamberlain 52', 55'	Report

Umpires:
Sarah Wilson (SCO)
Ayana McClean (TRI)

27 July 2014
14:00

Canada	4–1	Trinidad and Tobago
Stewart 28'; Stairs 34'; Gillis 56'; Johansen 70'	Report	Govia 67'

Umpires:
Alex Walker (SCO)
Miskarmalia Ariffin (SIN)

30 July 2014
14:00

New Zealand	6–0	Canada
Punt 1', 60'; Webster 16'; Forgesson 23', 48'; Whitelock 41'	Report

Umpires:
Nor Hafizah Azman (MAS)
Annelize Rostron (RSA)

Seventh place match

31 July 2014
21:15

Canada	2–2	Malaysia
Stairs 15'; Gillis 55'	Report	Fatin 48'; Nabihah 66'
Penalties
Secco (penalty shoot-out missed); Raye (penalty shoot-out missed); Sandhu (penalty shoot-out missed)	0–3	(penalty shoot-out scored) Nuraini; (penalty shoot-out scored) Norbaini; (penalty shoot-out scored) Sumantri

Umpires:
Hannah Sanders (ENG)
Aleesha Unka (NZL)

== Gymnastics ==
On June 18, 2014, Gymnastics Canada nominated thirteen athletes to the team.

=== Artistic ===
The artistic team won a total of nine medals, three of each colour.

Men

Athlete	Event	Final							
Athlete	Event	Apparatus						Total	Rank
Athlete	Event	F	V	R	PH	PB	HB	Total	Rank
Nathan Gafuik	Team	12.833	12.033		14.100	13.533	13.333	—N/a	
Scott Morgan	Team	14.933		15.200	14.666			—N/a	
Anderson Loran	Team	14.333	13.666	13.650	14.233		13.800	—N/a	
Kevin Lytwyn	Team	13.733		14.866		14.400	13.900	—N/a	
Zachary Clay	Team		12.966	11.233	13.100	14.233	13.833	—N/a	
Total	Team	42.999	38.655	43.716	42.999	42.166	41.533	252.078	3rd place, bronze medalist(s)

Individual finals

Athlete	Event	Total	Rank
Zachary Clay	Parallel bars	11.800	8
Scott Morgan	Floor	15.133	2nd place, silver medalist(s)
Scott Morgan	Rings	15.100	1st place, gold medalist(s)
Scott Morgan	Vault	14.733	1st place, gold medalist(s)
Anderson Loran	Horizontal bar	11.866	8
Anderson Loran	Pommel horse	13.600	7
Kevin Lytwyn	Horizontal bar	14.866	3rd place, bronze medalist(s)
Kevin Lytwyn	Parallel bars	14.033	6
Kevin Lytwyn	Rings	14.800	2nd place, silver medalist(s)

Women

Athlete	Event	Final					
Athlete	Event	Apparatus				Total	Rank
Athlete	Event	F	V	UB	BB	Total	Rank
Elsabeth Black	Team	13.633	14.233	13.333	13.966	55.165	2 Q
Maegan Chant	Team	13.133	14.000	12.700	12.333	52.166	7 Q
Victoria Kayen Woo	Team			10.888		—N/a	
Isabela Onyshko	Team	12.966	13.900	11.400	13.133	51.399	10 Q
Stefanie Merkle	Team	13.633	14.066		11.966	—N/a	
Total	Team	40.399	42.299	37.433	39.432	159.563	4

Individual all around final

Athlete	Event	Final					
Athlete	Event	Apparatus				Total	Rank
Athlete	Event	F	V	UB	BB	Total	Rank
Elsabeth Black	Individual	12.766	14.300	13.758	13.333	54.157	4
Maegan Chant	Individual	13.766	13.333	14.033	10.900	52.032	9
Isabela Onyshko	Individual	13.133	13.766	12.000	13.666	52.565	7

Individual finals

Athlete	Event	Total	Rank
Elsabeth Black	Balance beam	14.900	1st place, gold medalist(s)
Elsabeth Black	Floor	13.666	3rd place, bronze medalist(s)
Elsabeth Black	Uneven bars	13.700	4
Elsabeth Black	Vault	14.433	2nd place, silver medalist(s)
Maegan Chant	Vault	14.233	4
Stefanie Merkle	Floor	13.433	4
Isabela Onyshko	Balance beam	12.666	7

=== Rhythmic ===
The rhythmic team finished the games with a total of six medals. Patricia Bezzoubenko's six medals meant she won the most medals by an individual athlete at the games.

Team

Athlete	Event	Final					
Athlete	Event	Hoop	Ball	Clubs	Ribbon	Total	Rank
Patricia Bezzoubenko; Maria Kitkarska; Annabelle Kovacs	Team	43.150	40.500	41.900	40.075	141.450	1st place, gold medalist(s)

Individual

Athlete	Event	Qualification						Final					
Athlete	Event	Hoop	Ball	Clubs	Ribbon	Total	Rank	Hoop	Ball	Clubs	Ribbon	Total	Rank
Patricia Bezzoubenko	Individual	15.760 Q	14.500 Q	15.575 Q	13.750 Q	59.575	1 Q	14.175	15.200	15.000	14.800	59.175	1st place, gold medalist(s)
Maria Kitkarska	Individual	13.500	13.675 Q	13.750 Q	13.750 Q	55.250	7 Q	13.200	13.000	13.500	13.350	53.050	8
Annabelle Kovacs	Individual	13.900	12.325	11.850	12.625	50.700	13	did not advance					

Individual finals

Athlete	Event	Total	Rank
Patricia Bezzoubenko	Ball	15.250	1st place, gold medalist(s)
Patricia Bezzoubenko	Clubs	15.350	1st place, gold medalist(s)
Patricia Bezzoubenko	Hoop	14.800	1st place, gold medalist(s)
Patricia Bezzoubenko	Ribbon	13.800	3rd place, bronze medalist(s)
Maria Kitkarska	Ball	12.800	8
Maria Kitkarska	Clubs	14.000	6
Maria Kitkarska	Ribbon	13.375	6

== Judo ==
On June 6, 2014, Judo Canada nominated eleven athletes to the team. The team selected consists of current or past National Junior Champions who have been selected based on their current international experience and the promise of strong performances in the senior level. Thus the team selected does not consist of the top level athletes such as 2012 Olympic bronze medalist Antoine Valois-Fortier. The judo team finished the competition with a total of three bronze medals.

Men

Athlete	Event	Round of 32	Round of 16	Quarterfinal	Semifinal	Repechage	Final / BM	
Athlete	Event	Opposition Result	Opposition Result	Opposition Result	Opposition Result	Opposition Result	Opposition Result	Rank
Antoine Bouchard	−66 kg	Bye	Etoga (CMR); L 0000–1002	did not advance				
Jonah Burt	−81 kg	Ewers (WAL); W 1000–0001	Pavlinic (NZL); W 1000–0000	Messi (CMR); W 1110–0003	Livesey (ENG); L 0000–1000	Bye	Nicola (CYP); W 1000–0001	3rd place, bronze medalist(s)
Louis Krieber-Gagnon	−81 kg	Bye	Linguni (MAW); W 1000–0000	Brewer (NZL); W 0000–0001	Reed (ENG); L 0000–1000	Bye	Munyonga (ZAM); L 1001–0000	5
Martin Rygielski	+100 kg	—N/a	Bye	Snyman (RSA); L 0002–0001	Did not advance	Shaw (WAL); L 0002–1001	Did not advance	7

Women

Athlete	Event	Round of 16	Quarterfinal	Semifinal	Repechage	Final / BM	
Athlete	Event	Opposition Result	Opposition Result	Opposition Result	Opposition Result	Opposition Result	Rank
Audrée Francis-Méthot	−52 kg	Bye	Renicks (SCO); L 0003–0100	did not advance	Trotter (AUS); W 0101–0102	Kearney (NIR); L 0003–0100	5
Jessica Klimkait	−57 kg	Shivani (IND); W1020–0003	Ramsay (SCO); W 0113–0001	Davis (ENG); L 0002–0001	Bye	Manuel (NZL); L 0001–1001	5
Béatrice Valois-Fortier	−63 kg	Kee (NIR); W 1000–0000	Pitman (ENG); W 0013–0001	Dombeu (CMR); L 0000–0103	Bye	Yeats-Brown (ENG); L 0001–1000	5
Monika Burgess	−70 kg	Bye	de Villiers (NZL); L 0000–1010	Did not advance	Huidrom (IND); L 0002–0001	Did not advance	7
Alix Renaud-Roy	−70 kg	Ndanga Nana (CMR); W 0000–0001	Fletcher (CMR); L 0002–0001	Did not advance	Collins (AUS); W 1000–0000	Arscott (AUS); W 1000–0000	3rd place, bronze medalist(s)
Ana Laura Portuondo Isasi	−78 kg	—N/a	Chongtham (IND); W 1000–0001	Powell (WAL); L 0001–1100	Bye	Rose (SEY); W 1000–0000	3rd place, bronze medalist(s)
Sophie Vaillancourt	+78 kg	—N/a	Laprovidence (MRI); L 0000–1000	Did not advance	Kaur (IND); L 0002–0102	Did not advance	7

== Lawn bowls ==
On April 17, 2014, Bowls Canada Boulingrin named a team of 14 athletes to the team. Ryan Bester won the country's only medal (a silver) in the men's singles competition. The medal was the country's first since 2006.

Men

Athlete	Event	Group Stage						Quarterfinal	Semifinal	Final	
Athlete	Event	Opposition Score	Opposition Score	Opposition Score	Opposition Score	Opposition Score	Rank	Opposition Score	Opposition Score	Opposition Score	Rank
Ryan Bester	Singles	Shahzad (PAK); W 21–15	Bahadur (IND); W 21–10	Tuikiligana (FIJ); W 21–19	Rais (MAS); W 21–11	—N/a	1 Q	Musonda (ZAM); W 21–5	Mcilroy (NZL); W 21–10	Burnett (SCO); L 9–21	2nd place, silver medalist(s)
Ryan Bester; George Whitelaw	Pairs	Samoa; W 20–15	Papua New Guinea; L 10–16	Malta; L 6–20	Malaysia; W 14–13	Northern Ireland; L 15–22	5	did not advance			
Kevin Jones; Tim Mason; Chris Stadnyk	Triples	Norfolk Island; W 18–11	Jersey; L 10–28	Guernsey; L 16–18	New Zealand; L 16–20	Zambia; W 16–13	4	did not advance			
Kevin Jones; Tim Mason; Chris Stadnyk; George Whitelaw	Fours	Falkland Islands; W 16–6	Namibia; W 11–10	India; L 8–18	South Africa; L 10–16	—N/a	3	did not advance			

Women

Athlete	Event	Group Stage					Quarterfinal	Semifinal	Final	
Athlete	Event	Opposition Score	Opposition Score	Opposition Score	Opposition Score	Rank	Opposition Score	Opposition Score	Opposition Score	Rank
Kelly McKerihen	Singles	Jim (COK); L 20–21	Wimp (PNG); L 18–21	Moceiwai (FIJ); W 21–14	Piketh (RSA); W 21–13	3	did not advance			
Leanne Chinery; Jackie Foster	Pairs	Wales; L 10–19	Cook Islands; W 25–5	England; L 13–14	—N/a	3	did not advance			
Mary Ann Beath; Laura Hawryszko; Kelly McKerihen	Triples	Zambia; D 16–16	Fiji; L 16–17	Cook Islands; W 20–13	New Zealand; L 12–23	3	did not advance			
Mary Ann Beath; Leanne Chinery; Jackie Foster; Laura Hawryszko	Fours	England; L 11–21	South Africa; L 9–19	Norfolk Island; W 14–13	—N/a	3	did not advance			

Para

Athlete	Event	Group Stage				Quarterfinal	Semifinal	Final	
Athlete	Event	Opposition Score	Opposition Score	Opposition Score	Rank	Opposition Score	Opposition Score	Opposition Score	Rank
Alphonse Hanet; Guide: Viola Hanet; Heather Hannett; Guide: Susan Acorn	Pairs	South Africa; L 5–23	Malaysia; W 16–8	South Africa; L 10–20	3	did not advance			

== Rugby sevens ==
Canada qualified a rugby sevens team. The roster was officially announced on July 8 by Rugby Canada. After losing two of three group stage games, Canada won the bowl competition. By winning the bowl, the team finished in a rank of ninth place overall.

Roster

- Connor Braid
- Justin Douglas
- Sean Duke
- Mike Fuailefau
- Lucas Hammond
- Ciaran Hearn
- Nathan Hirayama
- Harry Jones
- John Moonlight
- Mike Scholz
- Conor Trainor
- Sean White

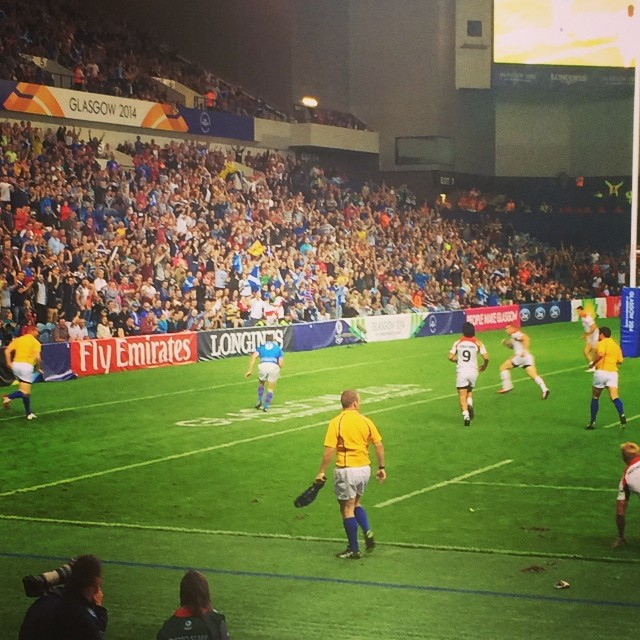
Canada takes on Scotland in the group stage.

Pool A

Team	Pld	W	D	L	PF	PA	PD	Pts	Qualification
New Zealand	3	3	0	0	115	14	+101	9	Medal competition
Scotland	3	2	0	1	91	22	+69	7	Medal competition
Canada	3	1	0	2	73	65	+8	5	Bowl competition
Barbados	3	0	0	3	5	183	−178	3	Bowl competition

26 July 2014
10:32

New Zealand	39–0	Canada
	Report

Ibrox Stadium, Glasgow

26 July 2014
12:50

Canada	68–5	Barbados
	Report

Ibrox Stadium, Glasgow

26 July 2014
21:04

Canada	5–21	Scotland
	Report

Ibrox Stadium, Glasgow

Bowl
Quarterfinals

27 July 2014
10:32

Canada	33–0	Trinidad and Tobago
	Report

Ibrox Stadium, Glasgow

Semifinal

27 July 2014
17:16

Canada	32–0	Uganda
	Report

Ibrox Stadium, Glasgow

Final

27 July 2014
20:10

Canada	50–7	Cook Islands
	Report

Ibrox Stadium, Glasgow

Finished in 9th place

== Shooting ==
On July 7, 2014, Shooting Canada nominated 16 athletes to the team. Canada's shooting team won three medals, tying the result from four years prior.

Men

Athlete	Event	Qualification		Final	
Athlete	Event	Points	Rank	Points	Rank
Jason Caswell	Skeet	117	8	did not advance	
Allan Harding	10 metre air pistol	560	17	did not advance	
Mark Hynes	50 metre pistol	527	14	did not advance	
Metodi Igorov	25 metre rapid fire pistol	278	6 Q	15	4
Wynn Payne	50 metre rifle prone	609.2	21	did not advance	
Drew Shaw	Trap	108	10	did not advance	
Paul Shaw	Trap	110	=7	did not advance	
Paul Shaw	Double trap	121	11	did not advance	
Jonathan Weselake	Skeet	did not start			

Women

Athlete	Event	Qualification		Final	
Athlete	Event	Points	Rank	Points	Rank
Aerial Arthur	10 metre air rifle	403.1	21	did not advance	
Monica Fyfe	10 metre air rifle	411.4	9	did not advance	
Lynda Kiejko	10 metre air pistol	378	3 Q	134.6	5
Lynda Kiejko	25 metre pistol	545	17	did not advance	
Dorothy Ludwig	10 metre air pistol	375	8 Q	177.2	3rd place, bronze medalist(s)
Dorothy Ludwig	25 metre pistol	555	13	did not advance	
Cynthia Meyer	Trap	57	14	did not advance	
Cynthia Meyer	Double trap	—N/a	—N/a	91	4
Susan Nattrass	Trap	65	9	did not advance	
Susan Nattrass	Double trap	—N/a	—N/a	72	8

Open

Athlete	Event	Day 1		Day 2		Day 3		Total	
Athlete	Event	Points	Rank	Points	Rank	Points	Rank	Overall	Rank
James Paton	Queen's prize individual	104	—N/a	150	—N/a	143	—N/a	397	2nd place, silver medalist(s)
Desmond Vamplew	Queen's prize individual	100	—N/a	147	—N/a	124	—N/a	371	28
James Paton; Desmond Vamplew	Queen's prize pairs	298	5	294	2	—N/a		592	2nd place, silver medalist(s)

== Squash ==
On May 28, 2014, Squash Canada named two athletes to the team. Canada's squash team did not manage to win a medal at the games, the only individual sport without a medalist.

Individual

Athlete	Event	Round of 128	Round of 64	Round of 32	Round of 16	Quarterfinals	Semifinals	Final
Athlete	Event	Opposition Score	Opposition Score	Opposition Score	Opposition Score	Opposition Score	Opposition Score	Opposition Score
Shawn Delierre	Men's Singles	Bye	Wei (PNG); W 11–0, 11–2, 11–5	Cuskelly (AUS); L 2–11, 7–11, 11–9, 11–8, 8–11	Did not advance			
Samantha Cornett	Women's Singles	—N/a	Bye	Cardwell (AUS); W 11–5, 11–7, 11–7	Duncalf (ENG); L 4–11, 5–11, 7–11	Did not advance		

Doubles

Athlete	Event	Group Stage		Round of 16	Quarterfinal	Semifinal	Final	
Athlete	Event	Opposition Score	Opposition Score	Rank	Opposition Score	Opposition Score	Opposition Score	Rank
Shawn Delierre; Samantha Cornett	Mixed doubles	Pallikal / Ghosal (IND); L 3–11, 2–11	Gunawardane / Laksiri (SRI); W 11–0, 11–9	2 Q	Selby / Kippax (ENG); L 7–11, 8–11	did not advance		

== Swimming ==
On April 8, 2014, Swimming Canada announced a team of 33 swimmers. Swimmer Alec Page was later removed from the team due to a doping violation, reducing the team to 32 swimmers. Canada's team won a total of eleven medals, one more than four year ago at the 2010 Commonwealth Games.

Men

Athlete	Event	Heat		Semifinal		Final	
Athlete	Event	Time	Rank	Time	Rank	Time	Rank
Yuri Kisil	50 m freestyle	22.87	12 Q	22.57	9	did not advance	
Yuri Kisil	100 m freestyle	49.85	7 Q	49.53	7 Q	49.27	4
Coleman Allen	200 m freestyle	1:50.31	15	—N/a		did not advance	
Ryan Cochrane	200 m freestyle	1:48.98	=8^{[a]}	—N/a		did not advance	
Will Brothers	400 m freestyle	3:54.89	14	—N/a		did not advance	
Ryan Cochrane	400 m freestyle	3:46.62	2 Q	—N/a		3:43.46	1st place, gold medalist(s)
Will Brothers	1500 m freestyle	15:22.92	10	—N/a		did not advance	
Ryan Cochrane	1500 m freestyle	15:03.29	1 Q	—N/a		14:44.03	1st place, gold medalist(s)
Russell Wood	50 m backstroke	25.75	8 Q	25.29	7 Q	25.55	7
Russell Wood	100 m backstroke	54.83	7 Q	54.45	7 Q	54.56	8
Russell Wood	200 m backstroke	1:59.92	6 Q	—N/a		1:59.32	7
Richard Funk	50 m breaststroke	28.02	9 Q	27.93	8 Q	28.21	8
Richard Funk	100 m breaststroke	1:01.25	5 Q	1:00.51	6 Q	1:00.75	6
Richard Funk	200 m breaststroke	2:12.56	10	—N/a		did not advance	
Evan White	200 m breaststroke	2:15.86	11	—N/a		did not advance	
Coleman Allen	50 m butterfly	24.25	10 Q	24.25	10	did not advance	
Gamal Assaad	50 m butterfly	24.66	13 Q	24.75	15	did not advance	
Coleman Allen	100 m butterfly	53.58	=9 Q	53.63	12	did not advance	
Gamal Assaad	100 m butterfly	54.62	16 Q	54.40	15	did not advance	
Evan White	100 m butterfly	53.98	12 Q	53.54	11	did not advance	
Gamal Assaad	200 m butterfly	2:02.60	13	—N/a		did not advance	
Evan White	200 m butterfly	2:00.96	12	—N/a		did not advance	
Luke Reilly	200 m individual medley	2:03.10	12	—N/a		did not advance	
Evan White	200 m individual medley	2:01.28	9	—N/a		did not advance	
Will Brothers	400 m individual medley	4:22.61	11	—N/a		did not advance	
Luke Reilly	400 m individual medley	4:18.49	7 Q	—N/a		4:19.72	7
Coleman Allen; Yuri Kisil; Evan White; Russell Wood	4 × 100 m freestyle relay	3:20.49	5 Q	—N/a		3:19.68	5
Coleman Allen*; Richard Funk; Yuri Kisil; Evan White; Russell Wood	4 × 100 m medley relay	3:37.71	2 Q	—N/a		3:36.61	4

* Swam in the heats only.

^{a} Ryan Cochrane finished in equal eighth position in the heats alongside England's Nick Grainger and Ieuan Lloyd from Wales. A swim-off was held between the three competitors which Grainger won and was awarded with the eighth and last qualification place in to the final.

Women

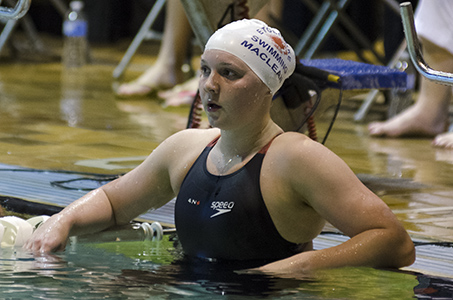
Brittany MacLean, represented Canada in four events.

Athlete	Event	Heat		Semifinal		Final	
Athlete	Event	Time	Rank	Time	Rank	Time	Rank
Sandrine Mainville	50 m freestyle	25.62	10 Q	25.76	13	did not advance	
Victoria Poon	50 m freestyle	25.38	8 Q	25.15	7 Q	25.29	6
Michelle Williams	50 m freestyle	25.48	9 Q	25.45	9	did not advance	
Alyson Ackman	100 m freestyle	55.77	9 Q	55.71	8 Q	55.47	8
Sandrine Mainville	100 m freestyle	55.16	6 Q	55.09	6 Q	55.15	=6
Victoria Poon	100 m freestyle	55.60	7 Q	55.19	7 Q	55.15	=6
Morgan Bird	100 m freestyle S8	1:10.65	4 Q	—N/a		1:10.07	4
Alyson Ackman	200 m freestyle	1:59.86	14	—N/a		did not advance	
Samantha Cheverton	200 m freestyle	1:58.61	7 Q	—N/a		1:57.79	7
Brittany MacLean	200 m freestyle	1:57.75	5 Q	—N/a		1:57.20	5
Tabitha Baumann	400 m freestyle	4:16.02	13	—N/a		did not advance	
Samantha Cheverton	400 m freestyle	4:09.88	7 Q	—N/a		4:09.85	8
Brittany MacLean	400 m freestyle	4:08.84	4 Q	—N/a		4:06.53	5
Tabitha Baumann	800 m freestyle	8:44.94	13	—N/a		did not advance	
Brittany MacLean	800 m freestyle	8:27.32	4 Q	—N/a		8:20.91	3rd place, bronze medalist(s)
Hilary Caldwell	50 m backstroke	29.31	10 Q	29.37	10	did not advance	
Brooklynn Snodgrass	50 m backstroke	28.80	6 Q	28.25	4 Q	27.97	3rd place, bronze medalist(s)
Hilary Caldwell	100 m backstroke	1:01.10	10 Q	1:00.77	9	did not advance	
Sinead Russell	100 m backstroke	1:00.15	3 Q	59.91	3 Q	1:00.27	6
Brooklynn Snodgrass	100 m backstroke	1:00.70	5 Q	1:00.26	6 Q	1:00.58	8
Hilary Caldwell	200 m backstroke	2:09.47	1 Q	—N/a		2:08.55	3rd place, bronze medalist(s)
Genevieve Cantin	200 m backstroke	2:11.59	6 Q	—N/a		2:10.91	7
Sinead Russell	200 m backstroke	2:12.78	7 Q	—N/a		2:12.61	8
Tera van Beilen	50 m breaststroke	31.31	7 Q	30.74	3 Q	31.22	5
Martha McCabe	100 m breaststroke	1:10.56	15 Q	1:09.63	15	did not advance	
Kierra Smith	100 m breaststroke	1:09.36	7 Q	1:08.49	6 Q	1:08.83	7
Tera van Beilen	100 m breaststroke	1:09.10	6 Q	1:08.11	5 Q	1:08.58	6
Aurelie Rivard	100 m breaststroke SB9	1:23.67	4 Q	—N/a		1:22.30	4
Katarina Roxon	100 m breaststroke SB9	1:25.97	6 Q	—N/a		1:23.95	5
Martha McCabe	200 m breaststroke	2:27.45	5 Q	—N/a		2:25.46	6
Kierra Smith	200 m breaststroke	2:25.19	1 Q	—N/a		2:25.40	=4
Tera van Beilen	200 m breaststroke	2:28.40	9	—N/a		did not advance	
Sandrine Mainville	50 m butterfly	26.46	8 Q	26.48	7 Q	26.64	8
Katerine Savard	50 m butterfly	26.33	3 Q	26.31	4 Q	26.27	6
Michelle Williams	50 m butterfly	27.02	12 Q	27.04	13	did not advance	
Audrey Lacroix	100 m butterfly	59.14	9 Q	58.69	7 Q	58.78	7
Katerine Savard	100 m butterfly	58.13	2 Q	57.83	2 Q	57.40 GR	1st place, gold medalist(s)
Audrey Lacroix	200 m butterfly	2:09.58	3 Q	—N/a		2:07.61	1st place, gold medalist(s)
Emily Overholt	200 m butterfly	2:15.83	15	—N/a		did not advance	
Katerine Savard	200 m butterfly	2:11.31	8 Q	—N/a		2:12.81	8
Marni Oldershaw	200 m individual medley	2:15.66	10	—N/a		did not advance	
Sydney Pickrem	200 m individual medley	2:14.95	8 Q	—N/a		2:14.91	8
Erika Seltenreich-Hodgson	200 m individual medley	2:14.55	5 Q	—N/a		2:11.76	5
Aurelie Rivard	200 m individual medley SM10	2:33.46	2 Q	—N/a		2:32.09	3rd place, bronze medalist(s)
Katarina Roxon	200 m individual medley SM10	2:45.98	5 Q	—N/a		2:43.19	5
Marni Oldershaw	400 m individual medley	4:48.89	8 Q	—N/a		4:46.26	6
Emily Overholt	400 m individual medley	4:39.52	3 Q	—N/a		4:37.89	5
Erika Seltenreich-Hodgson	400 m individual medley	4:41.77	5 Q	—N/a		4:36.88	4
Alyson Ackman; Sandrine Mainville; Victoria Poon; Michelle Williams	4 × 100 m freestyle relay	3:41.40	3 Q	—N/a		3:40.00	3rd place, bronze medalist(s)
Alyson Ackman; Samantha Cheverton; Brittany MacLean; Emily Overholt	4 × 200 m freestyle relay	8:10.45	4 Q	—N/a		7:51.67	2nd place, silver medalist(s)
Audrey Lacroix*; Sandrine Mainville; Sinead Russell; Katerine Savard; Kierra Smith*; Tera van Beilen; Michelle Williams*	4 × 100 m medley relay	4:07.13	3 Q	—N/a		4:00.57	3rd place, bronze medalist(s)

* Swam in the heats only.

== Table tennis ==
On July 9, 2014, Table Tennis Canada nominated six athletes to the squad. The women's doubles duo of Anqi Luo and Zhang Mo won a bronze, the only medal won by the team.

Individual

Athlete	Event	Group Stage			Round of 64	Round of 32	Round of 16	Quarterfinal	Semifinal	Final/Bronze medal	
Athlete	Event	Opposition Score	Opposition Score	Rank	Opposition Score	Opposition Score	Opposition Score	Opposition Score	Opposition Score	Opposition Score	Rank
Andre Ho	Men's singles	Loi (PNG); W 4–0	Spencer (SVG); W 4–0	1 Q	Ranasingha (SRI); W 4–0	Rumgay (SCO); L 1–4	did not advance				
Pierre-Luc Thériault	Men's singles	Lin (VAN); W 4–0	Chelibe (UGA); W 4–0	1 Q	O'Connell (WAL); W 4–0	Ghosh (IND); L 0–4	did not advance				
Eugene Wang	Men's singles	Bye				Yiangou (CYP); W 4–1	Baggaley (ENG); W 4–0	Jian (SIN); L 2–4	did not advance		
Betty Guo	Women's singles	Riley (BAR); W 4–0	Baah-Danso (GHA); W 4–0	1 Q	Mogey (NIR); L 0–4	did not advance					
Anqi Luo	Women's singles	Bye				Zhang (AUS); W 4–3	Batra (IND); L 2–4	did not advance			
Zhang Mo	Women's singles	Bye				Loveridge (GUE); W 4–0	Li (NZL); W 4–0	Yu (SIN); L 1–4	did not advance		

Doubles

Athlete	Event	Round of 64	Round of 32	Round of 16	Quarterfinal	Semifinal	Final/Bronze medal	
Athlete	Event	Opposition Score	Opposition Score	Opposition Score	Opposition Score	Opposition Score	Opposition Score	Rank
Andre Ho; Pierre-Luc Thériault	Men's doubles	—N/a	Lulu / Shing (VAN); W 3–0	Powell / Henzell (AUS); W 3–1	Zi / Jian (SIN); L 1–3	did not advance		
Anqi Luo; Zhang Mo	Women's doubles	—N/a	Loveridge / Morgan (GUE); W 3–0	Givan / Mogey (NIR); W 3–0	Ng / Beh (MAS); W 3–2	Miao / Lay (AUS); L 0–3	Drinkhall / Sibley (ENG); W 3–2	3rd place, bronze medalist(s)
Eugene Wang; Zhang Mo	Mixed doubles	Fo / Chowree (MRI); W 3–0	Hu / Tapper (AUS); W 3–0	Chew / Li (SIN); W 3–0	Pitchford / Ho (ENG); L 2–3	did not advance		
Andre Ho; Anqi Luo	Mixed doubles	Matlhatsi / Butale (BOT); W 3–0	Xiao / Hung (NZL); W 3–0	Drinkhall / Drinkhall (ENG); L 2–3	did not advance			
Pierre-Luc Thériault; Betty Guo	Mixed doubles	Edwards / Phillips (WAL); L 3–0	did not advance					

Team

Athlete	Event	Group Stage				Quarterfinal	Semifinal	Final/Bronze medal	
Athlete	Event	Opposition Score	Opposition Score	Opposition Score	Rank	Opposition Score	Opposition Score	Opposition Score	Rank
Andre Ho; Pierre-Luc Thériault; Eugene Wang	Men's team	Tanzania; W 3–0	Scotland; L 1–3	Uganda; W 3–0	2	did not advance			
Betty Guo; Anqi Luo; Zhang Mo	Women's team	Jamaica; W 3–0	Malaysia; L 2–3	Papua New Guinea; W 3–0	2 Q	Singapore; L 0–3	did not advance		

== Triathlon ==
On May 28, 2014, Triathlon Canada named a group of six athletes to the team. Kirsten Sweetland won the only medal by Canada in the sport. Her medal was the first medal the country won at the games.

Athlete	Event	Swim (1.5 km)	Bike (40 km)	Run (10 km)	Total Time	Rank
Kyle Jones	Men's	18:45	59:09	33:27	1:52:15	11
Matthew Sharpe	Men's	18:04	59:50	38:02	1:56:56	21
Andrew Yorke	Men's	18:44	59:12	31:50	1:50:40	4
Sarah-Anne Brault	Women's	20:59	1:10:40	did not finish		
Ellen Pennock	Women's	19:51	did not finish			
Kirsten Sweetland	Women's	19:53	1:03:41	34:26	1:59:01	2nd place, silver medalist(s)

Mixed

Athletes	Event	Total Times per Athlete (Swim 250 m, Bike 6 km, Run 1.6 km)	Total Group Time	Rank
Kirsten Sweetland; Matthew Sharpe; Sarah-Anne Brault; Andrew Yorke	Mixed relay	18:54; 17:58; 19:19; 18:06	1:14:17	4

== Weightlifting ==
On June 24, 2014, The Canadian Weightlifting Federation nominated fourteen athletes to the team. Canada's team won a total of four medals (two gold and two bronze).

Men

Athlete	Event	Snatch		Clean & Jerk		Total	Rank
Athlete	Event	Result	Rank	Result	Rank	Total	Rank
Francis Luna-Grenier	−69 kg	130	5	162	5	292	4
Nicolas Vachon	−69 kg	110	13	140	13	250	13
Jean-Marc Béland	−77 kg	138	5	157	10	295	8
Darryl Conrad	−85 kg	133	8	165	8	298	8
Pascal Plamondon	−85 kg	151	2	182	3	333	3rd place, bronze medalist(s)
David Samayoa	−94 kg	145	6	176	7	321	6
George Kobaladze	+105 kg	171	2	229	1	400 GR	1st place, gold medalist(s)
Parminder Phangura	+105 kg	150	7	191	5	341	6

Women

Athlete	Event	Snatch		Clean & Jerk		Total	Rank
Athlete	Event	Result	Rank	Result	Rank	Total	Rank
Jessica Ruel	−53 kg	76	9	91	9	167	9
Isabelle Després	−58 kg	81	9	98	9	179	9
Marie-Julie Malboeuf	−58 kg	82	8	100	8	182	7
Marie-Josée Arès-Pilon	−69 kg	99	3	115	5	214	3rd place, bronze medalist(s)
Kristel Ngarlem	−69 kg	85	7	116	4	201	5
Marie-Ève Beauchemin-Nadeau	−75 kg	110	1	140	1	250 GR	1st place, gold medalist(s)

== Wrestling ==
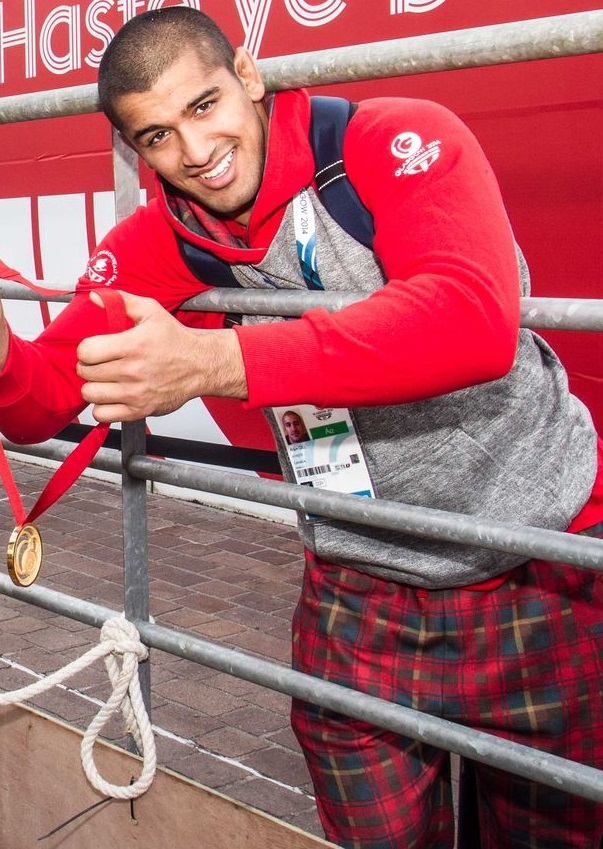
Arjun Gill won gold

On June 13, 2014 Wrestling Canada Lutte nominated fourteen athletes to the team. Canada's wrestling team won a total of twelve medals, including seven gold. The twelve medals is the highest won by the country in freestyle wrestling at the Commonwealth Games.

Key:

- VT - Victory by Fall.
- PP - Decision by Points - the loser with technical points.
- PO - Decision by Points - the loser without technical points.

Men's freestyle

Athlete	Event	Round of 32	Round of 16	Quarterfinal	Semifinal	Repechage 1	Repechage 2	Final / BM	
Athlete	Event	Opposition Result	Opposition Result	Opposition Result	Opposition Result	Opposition Result	Opposition Result	Opposition Result	Rank
Michael Asselstine	−61 kg	—N/a	Etko (SCO); L 1–3 ^{PP}	did not advance					
David Tremblay	−61 kg	—N/a	Vella (MLT); W 4–1 ^{PP}	Essindi Sengui (CMR); W 4–1 ^{PP}	Etko (SCO); W 3–1 ^{PP}	—N/a		Bajrang (IND); W 4–1 ^{PP}	1st place, gold medalist(s)
Jevon Balfour	−65 kg	—N/a	Clarkson (NGR); W 3–1 ^{PP}	Salman (PAK); W 3–1 ^{PP}	van Rensburg (RSA); W 3–1 ^{PP}	—N/a		Dutt (IND); L 4–0 ^{PO}	2nd place, silver medalist(s)
Chris Laverick	−74 kg	Bibo (NGR); L 1–4 ^{PP}	did not advance						
Tamerlan Tagziev	−86 kg	Bye	Abdo (AUS); W 4–0 ^{PO}	Inam (PAK); W 3–1 ^{PP}	Kumar (IND); W 5–0 ^{VT}	—N/a		Dick (NGR); W 4–1 ^{PP}	1st place, gold medalist(s)
Arjun Gill	−97 kg	—N/a	Bye	McCloskey (NIR); W 4–1 ^{PP}	Belkin (NZL); W 4–1 ^{PP}	—N/a		Kadian (IND); W 3–1 ^{PP}	1st place, gold medalist(s)
Korey Jarvis	−125 kg	—N/a	Bye	Mkanga (KEN); W 4–1 ^{PP}	Xxx (ENG); W 4–1 ^{PP}	—N/a		Tomar (IND); W 3–1 ^{PP}	1st place, gold medalist(s)

Women's freestyle

Athlete	Event	Round of 16	Quarterfinal	Semifinal	Repechage	Final / BM	
Athlete	Event	Opposition Result	Opposition Result	Opposition Result	Opposition Result	Opposition Result	Rank
Jasmine Mian	−48 kg	Bye	—N/a	Vinesh (IND); L 1–4 ^{PP}	—N/a	Nweke (NGR); W 4–1 ^{PP}	3rd place, bronze medalist(s)
Jillian Gallays	−53 kg	—N/a	Adekuoroye (NGR); L 4–0 ^{PO}	Did not advance	—N/a	Emofack Letchidji (CMR); W 5–0 ^{VT}	3rd place, bronze medalist(s)
Brittanee Laverdure	−55 kg	—N/a	Essombe Tiako (CMR); W 4–0 ^{PO}	Nwoye (NGR); W 3–1 ^{PP}	—N/a	Kumari (IND); L 3–1 ^{PP}	2nd place, silver medalist(s)
Braxton Stone	−58 kg	Bye	Butkevych (ENG); W 3–1 ^{PP}	Malik (IND); L 1–3 ^{PP}	—N/a	Ngono Eyia (CMR); W 5–0 ^{VT}	3rd place, bronze medalist(s)
Danielle Lappage	−63 kg	—N/a	Oborududu (NGR); 3–1 ^{PP}	Spiteri (ENG); W 4–0 ^{PO}	—N/a	Jakhar (IND); W 3–0 ^{PO}	1st place, gold medalist(s)
Dorothy Yeats	−69 kg	—N/a	Jones (SCO); W 5–0 ^{VT}	Kaur (IND); W 4–0 ^{PO}	—N/a	Tomo (CMR); W 4–0 ^{PO}	1st place, gold medalist(s)

Athlete	Event	Nordic 1	Nordic 2	Nordic 3	Nordic 4	Standings
Athlete	Event	Opposition Result	Opposition Result	Opposition Result	Opposition Result	Rank
Erica Wiebe	−75 kg	Edwards (ENG); W 4–0 ^{PO}	Onyebuchi (NGR); W 4–1 ^{PP}	Ali (CMR); W 3–1 ^{PP}	Jyoti (IND); W 4–0 ^{VT}	1st place, gold medalist(s)
