= Diving at the 2014 Commonwealth Games =

- Venue: Royal Commonwealth Pool
- Dates: 30 July – 2 August 2014
- Competitors: 56 from 9 nations

Diving at the 2014 Commonwealth Games was the 20th appearance of Diving at the Commonwealth Games. The diving competitions at the 2014 Commonwealth Games in Glasgow, Scotland took place between 30 July and 2 August at the Royal Commonwealth Pool in Edinburgh. It was one of two aquatic sports at the Games, along with swimming.

The 2014 Games featured competitions in ten events (men and women events each of): 1m springboard, 3m springboard, synchronised 3m springboard, 10m platform, and synchronised 10m platform.

== Schedule ==
All times are British Summer Time (UTC+1)

P	Preliminaries	F	Final

Date →	Wed 30		Thu 31		Fri 1		Sat 2	
Event ↓	M	E	M	E	M	E	M	E
Men's 1 m springboard	P	F						
Men's 3 m springboard			P	F				
Men's 10 m platform							P	F
Men's synchronised 3 m springboard					F			
Men's synchronised 10 m platform						F		
Women's 1 m springboard					P	F		
Women's 3 m springboard							P	F
Women's 10 m platform			P	F				
Women's synchronised 3 m springboard		F						
Women's synchronised 10 m platform	F							

M = Morning session, E = Evening session

== Medal summary ==
=== Medal table ===
Rank	Nation	Gold	Silver	Bronze	Total
1	England	4	3	3	10
2	Canada	3	2	2	7
3	Australia	2	3	3	8
4	Malaysia	1	2	1	4
Totals (4 entries)		10	10	9	29

=== Men ===
Event	Gold	Silver	Bronze
1 m springboard	Jack Laugher; England	Matthew Mitcham; Australia	Grant Nel; Australia
3 m springboard	Ooi Tze Liang; Malaysia	Jack Laugher; England	Oliver Dingley; England
10 m platform	Tom Daley; England	Ooi Tze Liang; Malaysia	Vincent Riendeau; Canada
Synchronised 3 m springboard	England; Jack Laugher; Chris Mears	Australia; Matthew Mitcham; Grant Nel	England; Nicholas Robinson-Baker; Freddie Woodward
Synchronised 10 m platform^{[a]}	Australia; Matthew Mitcham; Domonic Bedggood	England; Tom Daley; James Denny	Not awarded

^{a} Only four teams were registered to compete in the men's synchronised 10 metre platform event. As stipulated in the rules of the Games, this resulted in only the gold and silver medals being awarded.

=== Women ===
Event	Gold	Silver	Bronze
1 m springboard	Jennifer Abel; Canada	Maddison Keeney; Australia	Esther Qin; Australia
3 m springboard	Esther Qin; Australia	Jennifer Abel; Canada	Hannah Starling; England
10 m platform	Meaghan Benfeito; Canada	Pandelela Rinong; Malaysia	Roseline Filion; Canada
Synchronised 3 m springboard	England; Alicia Blagg; Rebecca Gallantree	Canada; Jennifer Abel; Pamela Ware	Australia; Maddison Keeney; Anabelle Smith
Synchronised 10 m platform	Canada; Meaghan Benfeito; Roseline Filion	England; Sarah Barrow; Tonia Couch	Malaysia; Pandelela Rinong; Nur Dhabitah Sabri

== Participating nations ==
Nine nations competed in diving at the 2014 Commonwealth Games.

- Australia (12)
- Canada (11)
- England (14)
- India (2)
- Jamaica (1)
- Malaysia (11)
- New Zealand (2)
- Scotland (2)
- Tonga (1)
