= Triathlon at the 2014 Commonwealth Games – Men's =

Men's Triathlon at the 2014 Commonwealth Games
- Venue: Strathclyde Country Park
- Date: 24 July 2014
- Competitors: 45 from 22 nations
- Winning time: 1:48:50

Medalists
gold medal	Alistair Brownlee	England
silver medal	Jonathan Brownlee	England
bronze medal	Richard Murray	South Africa

The men's triathlon was part of the Triathlon at the 2014 Commonwealth Games program. The competition was held on 24 July 2014 at Strathclyde Country Park in Glasow.

== Competition format ==
The race was held over the "international distance" (also called "Olympic distance") and consisted of 1,500 metres (0.93 mi) swimming, 43 kilometres (27 mi) road bicycling, and 10 kilometres (6.2 mi) road running.

== Results ==
A total of 45 athletes participated.

Rank	#	Triathlete	Swimming	Cycling	Running	Total time	Difference
1st place, gold medalist(s)	3	Alistair Brownlee (ENG)	18:00	58:43	31:09	1:48:50	-
2nd place, silver medalist(s)	1	Jonathan Brownlee (ENG)	17:58	58:45	31:21	1:49:01	+0:11
3rd place, bronze medalist(s)	2	Richard Murray (RSA)	18:45	59:09	31:35	1:50:21	+1:31
4	15	Andrew Yorke (CAN)	18:44	59:12	31:50	1:50:40	+1:50
5	6	Ryan Bailie (AUS)	18:11	59:45	31:53	1:50:43	+1:53
6	9	Aaron Harris (ENG)	18:39	59:12	32:01	1:50:49	+1:59
7	14	David McNamee (SCO)	18:46	59:08	32:08	1:50:59	+2:09
8	4	Aaron Royle (AUS)	18:12	59:42	32:16	1:51:03	+2:13
9	8	Dan Wilson (AUS)	18:44	59:07	32:50	1:51:36	+2:46
10	12	Tony Dodds (NZL)	18:42	59:11	33:08	1:51:58	+3:08
11	10	Kyle Jones (CAN)	18:45	59:09	33:27	1:52:15	+3:25
12	17	Conor Murphy (NIR)	18:35	59:20	33:40	1:52:29	+3:39
13	5	Ryan Sissons (NZL)	18:40	59:14	34:10	1:53:01	+4:11
14	16	Grant Sheldon (SCO)	18:35	59:13	34:21	1:53:10	+4:20
15	11	Wian Sullwald (RSA)	18:42	1:00:17	33:47	1:53:43	+4:53
16	7	Henri Schoeman (RSA)	17:54	59:57	34:51	1:53:46	+4:56
17	35	Daniel Halksworth (JER)	18:09	59:33	36:14	1:54:53	+6:03
18	18	Jason Wilson (BAR)	18:37	59:19	36:30	1:55:21	+6:31
19	22	Tyler Butterfield (BER)	19:00	1:01:12	34:13	1:55:31	+6:41
20	24	Matthew Wright (BAR)	18:56	1:02:01	34:52	1:56:51	+8:01
21	19	Matthew Sharpe (CAN)	18:04	59:50	38:02	1:56:56	+8:06
22	21	Mark Austin (SCO)	18:01	59:57	38:58	1:57:53	+9:03
23	23	Russell White (NIR)	18:48	1:02:31	37:00	1:59:20	+10:30
24	32	Thomas Perchard (JER)	20:50	1:05:14	37:10	2:04:16	+15:26
25	25	Drikus Coetzee (NAM)	20:54	1:05:14	41:15	2:08:23	+19:33
26	42	Christopher Walker (GIB)	21:22	1:07:17	40:57	2:10:45	+21:55
27	33	Harry Speers (NIR)	20:13	1:08:32	42:43	2:12:29	+23:39
	20	Tom Davison (NZL)	18:55	1:18:32	Did not finish		
	27	Andrew Nash (IOM)	23:16	LAP			
	37	Andrew Gordon (GIB)	22:38	LAP			
	28	Keith Galea (MLT)	23:18	LAP			
	44	Swaleh Balala (KEN)	22:36	LAP			
	43	Boris Toulet (MRI)	23:51	LAP			
	46	Jonathan Herring (BER)	23:20	LAP			
	39	Richard Muscat (GIB)	24:13	LAP			
	30	Tucker Murphy (BER)	25:45	LAP			
	38	Boris De Chazal (MRI)	25:40	LAP			
	31	Christopher Symonds (GHA)	25:47	LAP			
	40	David Cottle (TRI)	25:07	LAP			
	45	Jad Godfrey Nalo (SOL)	25:21	LAP			
	41	Stanley Ofasisili (SOL)	26:46	LAP			
	36	Casmer Kamangip (PNG)	28:13	LAP			
	29	Polihau Popeliau (PNG)	Did not finish				
	26	Bob Gabourel (BIZ)	Did not finish				
	47	Vincent Onyango (KEN)	Did not finish				
