= Gymnastics at the 2014 Commonwealth Games – Men's parallel bars =

Commonwealth games

Men's parallel bars at the 2014 Commonwealth Games
- Venue: SSE Hydro
- Dates: 1 August 2014
- Competitors: 8 from 4 nations
- Winning score: 15.533

Medalists
gold medal	Daniel Purvis	Scotland
silver medal	Nile Wilson	England
bronze medal	Max Whitlock	England

The men's individual parallel bars competition of the 2014 Commonwealth Games took place on August 1 at the SSE Hydro arena in Glasgow, Scotland.

== Results ==
=== Qualification ===
Qualification took place on July 29 as part of the team and individual qualification event.

=== Final ===
Position	Gymnast	D Score	E Score	Penalty	Total
1st place, gold medalist(s)	Daniel Purvis (SCO)	6.500	9.033		15.533
2nd place, silver medalist(s)	Nile Wilson (ENG)	6.400	9.033		15.433
3rd place, bronze medalist(s)	Max Whitlock (ENG)	6.100	8.966		15.066
4	Frank Baines (SCO)	5.800	9.066		14.866
5	Naoya Tsukahara (AUS)	5.600	8.533		14.133
6	Kevin Lytwyn (CAN)	5.800	8.233		14.033
7	Luke Wadsworth (AUS)	5.600	6.800		12.400
8	Zachary Clay (CAN)	5.900	5.900		11.800
