= Diving at the 2014 Commonwealth Games – Women's 1 metre springboard =

Women's 1 metre springboard at the 2014 Commonwealth Games
- Venue: Strathclyde Country Park
- Date: 1 August
- Competitors: 13 from 6 nations
- Winning points: 287.25

Medalists
gold medal	Jennifer Abel	Canada
silver medal	Maddison Keeney	Australia
bronze medal	Esther Qin	Australia

The women's 1 metre springboard was part of the Diving at the 2014 Commonwealth Games program. The competition was held on 1 August 2014 at Royal Commonwealth Pool in Edinburgh.

== Schedule ==
All times are British Summer Time (UTC+1)

Date	Time	Round
1 August 2014	10:05	Preliminaries
1 August 2014	18:05	Finals

== Format ==
The 13 divers will dive compete in a preliminary round, with each driver making six dives. The 12 best divers will advance to the final round during the evening session, where all previous scores will be cleared.

== Results ==
Green denotes finalists

Rank	Diver	Preliminary		Final	
Rank	Diver	Points	Rank	Points	Rank
Gold medal	Jennifer Abel (CAN)	264.50	5	287.25	1
Silver medal	Maddison Keeney (AUS)	275.20	3	281.95	2
Bronze medal	Esther Qin (AUS)	283.50	1	278.65	3
4	Georgia Sheehan (AUS)	248.75	10	278.60	4
5	Grace Reid (SCO)	257.90	7	269.40	5
6	Pamela Ware (CAN)	278.40	2	265.10	6
7	Hannah Starling (ENG)	252.40	8	264.05	7
8	Cheong Jun Hoong (MAS)	265.80	4	260.00	8
9	Rebecca Gallantree (ENG)	260.35	6	259.20	9
10	Alicia Blagg (ENG)	237.05	11	257.50	10
11	Emma Friesen (CAN)	249.25	9	249.40	11
12	Traisy Vivien Tukiet (MAS)	219.30	12	205.75	12
13	Maria Zarka (TON)	172.45	13		
