= Andrew Yorke =

Andrew Yorke may refer to:

- Andy Yorke (born 1972), English musician
- Andrew Yorke (triathlete) (born 1988), Canadian triathlete
