= Diving at the 2014 Commonwealth Games – Men's synchronised 10 metre platform =

Men's synchronised 10 metre platform at the 2014 Commonwealth Games
- Venue: Strathclyde Country Park
- Date: August 1
- Competitors: 8 from 4 nations
- Winning sore: 399.54

Medalists
gold medal	Matthew Mitcham; Domonic Bedggood	Australia
silver medal	Tom Daley; James Denny	England

The men's synchronised 10 metre platform was part of the Diving at the 2014 Commonwealth Games program. The competition was held on 1 August 2014 at Royal Commonwealth Pool in Edinburgh.

== Schedule ==
All times are British Summer Time (UTC+1)

Date	Time	Round
1 August 2014	19:19	Finals

== Format ==
A single round was held, with each team making six dives. Eleven judges scored each dive: three for each diver, and five for synchronisation. Only the middle score counted for each diver, with the middle three counting for synchronisation. These five scores were averaged, multiplied by 3, and multiplied by the dive's degree of difficulty to give a total dive score. The scores for each of the five dives were summed to give a final score.

== Results ==
Final results:

Rank	Nation	Dives						Total
Rank	Nation	1	2	3	4	5	6	Total
Gold medal	Australia; Matthew Mitcham; Domonic Bedggood	54.00	51.00	79.20	66.30	60.48	88.56	399.54
Silver medal	England; Tom Daley; James Denny	53.40	48.60	73.92	63.72	64.26	95.46	399.36
3	Malaysia; Ooi Tze Liang; Chew Yiwei	52.20	52.80	68.40	83.52	60.39	70.08	387.39
4	Canada; Maxim Bouchard; Vincent Riendeau	53.40	52.20	72.00	58.56	73.26	74.88	384.30

- Only four teams were registered to compete in the men's synchronized 10 metre platform event, which resulted in only the gold and silver medals being awarded.
