= Diving at the 2014 Commonwealth Games – Women's 10 metre platform =

Women's 10 metre platform at the 2014 Commonwealth Games
- Venue: Strathclyde Country Park
- Date: July 31
- Competitors: 12 from 4 nations
- Winning points: 372.65

Medalists
| gold medal | Meaghan Benfeito | Canada |
| silver medal | Pandelela Rinong | Malaysia |
| bronze medal | Roseline Filion | Canada |

The women's 10 metre platform was part of the Diving at the 2014 Commonwealth Games program. The competition was held on 31 July 2014 at Royal Commonwealth Pool in Edinburgh.

== Schedule ==
All times are British Summer Time (UTC+1)

| Date | Time | Round |
|---|---|---|
| 31 July 2014 | 12:06 | Preliminaries |
| 31 July 2014 | 19:41 | Finals |

== Format ==
The 12 divers will dive compete in a preliminary round, with each driver making five dives. All 12 divers will advance to the final round during the evening session, where all previous scores will be cleared.

== Results ==
Green denotes finalists

| Rank | Diver | Preliminary | | Final | |
| Rank | Diver | Points | Rank | Points | Rank |
|---|---|---|---|---|---|
| Gold medal | Meaghan Benfeito (CAN) | 318.45 | 4 | 372.65 | 1 |
| Silver medal | Pandelela Rinong (MAS) | 348.80 | 1 | 368.55 | 2 |
| Bronze medal | Roseline Filion (CAN) | 348.80 | 1 | 361.80 | 3 |
| 4 | Lara Tarvit (AUS) | 301.60 | 7 | 341.60 | 4 |
| 5 | Tonia Couch (ENG) | 337.00 | 3 | 335.70 | 5 |
| 6 | Cheong Jun Hoong (MAS) | 304.45 | 5 | 332.60 | 6 |
| 7 | Carol-Ann Ware (CAN) | 261.15 | 11 | 320.80 | 7 |
| 8 | Loh Zhiayi (MAS) | 259.25 | 12 | 318.25 | 8 |
| 9 | Sarah Barrow (ENG) | 290.60 | 9 | 315.80 | 9 |
| 10 | Victoria Vincent (ENG) | 297.30 | 8 | 299.50 | 10 |
| 11 | Melissa Wu (AUS) | 302.30 | 6 | 259.20 | 11 |
| 12 | Rachel Bugg (AUS) | 281.95 | 10 | 247.90 | 12 |
