= Gymnastics at the 2014 Commonwealth Games – Men's horizontal bar =

Men's horizontal bar at the 2014 Commonwealth Games
- Venue: SSE Hydro
- Dates: 1 August 2014
- Competitors: 8 from 4 nations
- Winning score: 14.966

Medalists
gold medal	Nile Wilson	England
silver medal	Kristian Thomas	England
bronze medal	Kevin Lytwyn	Canada

The men's individual horizontal bar competition of the 2014 Commonwealth Games took place on August 1 at the SSE Hydro arena in Glasgow, Scotland.

== Results ==
=== Qualification ===
Qualification took place on July 29 as part of the team and individual qualification event.

=== Final ===
Position	Gymnast	D Score	E Score	Penalty	Total
1st place, gold medalist(s)	Nile Wilson (ENG)	6.100	8.866		14.966
2nd place, silver medalist(s)	Kristian Thomas (ENG)	6.500	8.466		14.966
3rd place, bronze medalist(s)	Kevin Lytwyn (CAN)	6.500	8.366		14.866
4	Frank Baines (SCO)	5.900	8.666		14.566
5	Naoya Tsukahara (AUS)	5.700	8.366		14.066
6	Daniel Keatings (SCO)	5.600	7.766		13.366
7	Sean Ohara (AUS)	5.200	7.500		12.700
8	Anderson Loran (CAN)	6.200	5.666		11.866

Although both received the same total score, Nile Wilson was awarded the gold medal over Kristian Thomas based on his higher execution score.
