= Diving at the 2014 Commonwealth Games – Men's 10 metre platform =

Men's 10 metre platform at the 2014 Commonwealth Games
- Venue: Royal Commonwealth Pool
- Date: August 2
- Competitors: 11 from 6 nations
- Winning points: 516.55

Medalists
gold medal	Tom Daley	England
silver medal	Ooi Tze Liang	Malaysia
bronze medal	Vincent Riendeau	Canada

The Men's 10 metre platform diving event is one of 261 events in 17 disciplines at the 2014 Commonwealth Games. It was held on August 2, 2014. Tom Daley of England won the gold medal, Ooi Tze Liang of Malaysia won the silver medal and Vincent Riendeau of Canada won the Bronze madal.

== Schedule ==
All times are British Summer Time (UTC+1)

Date	Time	Round
2 August 2014	11:38	Preliminaries
2 August 2014	19:30	Finals

== Format ==
The divers were to compete in a preliminary round, with each diver making six dives. The 12 best divers were to advance to the final round during the evening session, where all previous scores would be cleared. However, since there were only 11 divers in the competition all the divers progressed to the final, with the preliminary round only serving to determine the order in which they dived in the final.

== Results ==
Green denotes finalists

Rank	Diver	Preliminary		Final	
Rank	Diver	Points	Rank	Points	Rank
Gold medal	Tom Daley (ENG)	488.85	1	516.55	1
Silver medal	Ooi Tze Liang (MAS)	419.50	5	433.70	2
Bronze medal	Vincent Riendeau (CAN)	440.10	4	429.25	3
4	Matthew Mitcham (AUS)	450.80	2	420.00	4
5	Maxim Bouchard (CAN)	441.50	3	399.20	5
6	James Denny (ENG)	408.40	6	397.65	6
7	Domonic Bedggood (AUS)	390.25	8	397.55	7
8	Fengyang Li (NZL)	391.70	7	379.95	8
9	Matthew Dixon (ENG)	365.65	10	366.15	9
10	Chew Yi Wei (MAS)	367.15	9	358.55	10
11	Siddharth Pardeshi (IND)	256.65	11	258.30	11
