= Diving at the 2014 Commonwealth Games – Men's 3 metre springboard =

Men's 3 metre springboard at the 2014 Commonwealth Games
- Venue: Strathclyde Country Park
- Date: July 31
- Competitors: 17 from 8 nations
- Winning points: 457.60

Medalists
gold medal	Ooi Tze Liang	Malaysia
silver medal	Jack Laugher	England
bronze medal	Oliver Dingley	England

The men's 3 metre springboard was part of the Diving at the 2014 Commonwealth Games program. The competition was held on 31 July 2014 at Royal Commonwealth Pool in Edinburgh.

== Schedule ==
All times are British Summer Time (UTC+1)

Date	Time	Round
31 July 2014	10:05	Preliminaries
31 July 2014	18:05	Finals

== Format ==
The 17 divers will dive compete in a preliminary round, with each driver making six dives. The 12 best divers will advance to the final round during the evening session, where all previous scores will be cleared.

== Results ==
Green denotes finalists

Rank	Diver	Preliminary		Final	
Rank	Diver	Points	Rank	Points	Rank
Gold medal	Ooi Tze Liang (MAS)	416.15	2	457.60	1
Silver medal	Jack Laugher (ENG)	465.80	1	449.70	2
Bronze medal	Oliver Dingley (ENG)	387.05	8	425.20	3
4	Riley McCormick (CAN)	403.10	4	413.40	4
5	Ahmad Amsyar Azman (MAS)	368.75	10	412.65	5
6	James Denny (ENG)	394.05	6	410.90	6
7	François Imbeau-Dulac (CAN)	406.35	3	402.70	7
8	James Heatly (SCO)	397.65	5	393.35	8
9	Cody Yano (CAN)	364.35	12	375.85	9
10	Chew Yi Wei (MAS)	364.65	11	368.50	10
11	Yona Knight-Wisdom (JAM)	393.20	7	360.90	11
12	Li Feng Yang (NZL)	375.30	9	320.10	12
13	Ramananda Kongbrailatpam (IND)	358.70	13		
14	Liam Stone (NZL)	351.55	14		
15	Grant Nel (AUS)	335.25	15		
16	Domonic Bedggood (AUS)	302.05	16		
17	Siddharth Pardeshi (IND)	271.55	17		
