= Gymnastics at the 2014 Commonwealth Games – Men's rings =

Men's rings at the 2014 Commonwealth Games
- Venue: SSE Hydro
- Dates: 31 July 2014
- Competitors: 8 from 6 nations
- Winning score: 15.100

Medalists
gold medal	Scott Morgan	Canada
silver medal	Kevin Lytwyn	Canada
bronze medal	Daniel Purvis	Scotland

The men's individual rings competition of the 2014 Commonwealth Games took place on July 31 at the SSE Hydro arena in Glasgow, Scotland.

== Results ==
=== Qualification ===
Qualification took place on July 28 as part of the team and individual qualification event.

=== Final ===
Position	Gymnast	D Score	E Score	Penalty	Total
1st place, gold medalist(s)	Scott Morgan (CAN)	6.600	8.500		15.100
2nd place, silver medalist(s)	Kevin Lytwyn (CAN)	6.000	8.800		14.800
3rd place, bronze medalist(s)	Daniel Purvis (SCO)	6.200	8.566		14.766
4	Naoya Tsukahara (AUS)	6.300	8.400		14.700
5	Max Whitlock (ENG)	5.900	8.666		14.566
6	Clinton Purnell (WAL)	5.800	8.733		14.533
7	Nile Wilson (ENG)	6.000	8.466		14.466
8	Matthew Palmer (NZL)	5.800	8.366		14.166
