= Wrestling at the 2014 Commonwealth Games – Men's freestyle 97 kg =

Wrestling – Men's freestyle 97 kg at the 2014 Commonwealth Games
- Venue: Scottish Exhibition and Conference Centre
- Dates: 30 July 2014
- Competitors: 11 from 11 nations

Medalists
gold medal	Arjun Gill	Canada
silver medal	Satywart Kadian	India
bronze medal	Sam Belkin	New Zealand
bronze medal	Leon Rattigan	England

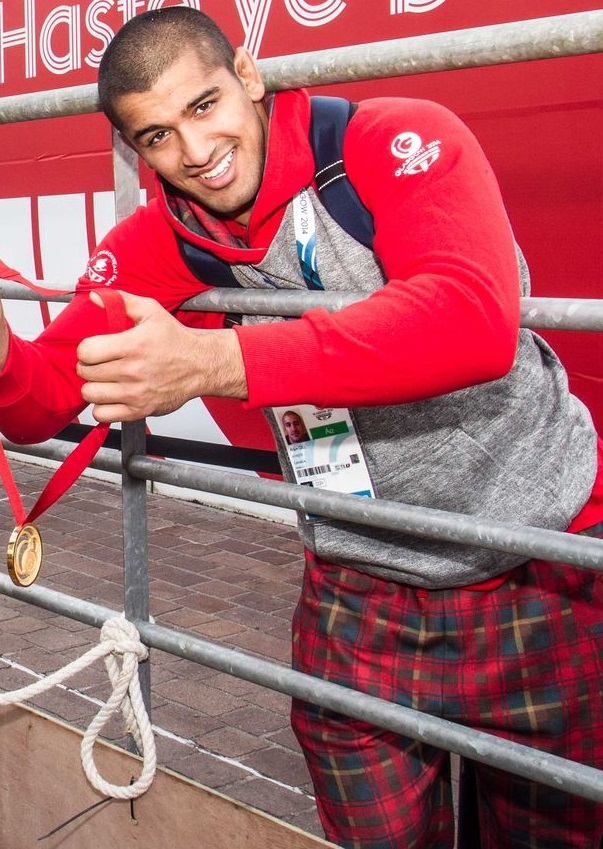
Arjun Gill was the champion

The Men's 97 kg freestyle wrestling competitions at the 2014 Commonwealth Games in Glasgow, Scotland was held on 30 July at the Scottish Exhibition and Conference Centre.

This freestyle wrestling competition consists of a single-elimination tournament, with a repechage used to determine the winner of two bronze medals. The two finalists face off for gold and silver medals. Each wrestler who loses to one of the two finalists moves into the repechage, culminating in a pair of bronze medal matches featuring the semifinal losers each facing the remaining repechage opponent from their half of the bracket.

== Results ==
Results:

Legend

- F — Won by fall
- WO — Won by walkover

=== Main bracket ===
Round of 16
Leon Rattigan (ENG)	6
Angula Shikongo (NAM)	2
Manjula Arachchige (SRI)	0
Satywart Kadian (IND)	10
Taonatetika Koru (KIR)	0
Soso Tamarau (NGR)	10

Quarterfinals
Sam Belkin (NZL)	WO
Billal Hosen (BAN)
Hugh McCloskey (NIR)	5
Arjun Gill (CAN)	16
Umair Tariq (PAK)	2
Leon Rattigan (ENG)	8
Satywart Kadian (IND)	6
Soso Tamarau (NGR)	2

Semifinals
Sam Belkin (NZL)	1
Arjun Gill (CAN)	14
Leon Rattigan (ENG)	4
Satywart Kadian (IND)	8

Final
Arjun Gill (CAN)	4
Satywart Kadian (IND)	4

=== Repechage ===
Repechage first round
Manjula Arachchige (SRI)	0
Soso Tamarau (NGR)	6

Bronze medal match
Hugh McCloskey (NIR)	0
Sam Belkin (NZL)	10
Soso Tamarau (NGR)	2
Leon Rattigan (ENG)	12
