= Diving at the 2014 Commonwealth Games – Women's 3 metre springboard =

Women's 3 metre springboard at the 2014 Commonwealth Games
- Venue: Strathclyde Country Park
- Date: 2 August
- Competitors: 14 from 6 nations
- Winning points: 347.25

Medalists
gold medal	Esther Qin	Australia
silver medal	Jennifer Abel	Canada
bronze medal	Hannah Starling	England

The women's 3 metre springboard was part of the Diving at the 2014 Commonwealth Games program. The competition was held on 2 August 2014 at Royal Commonwealth Pool in Edinburgh.

== Schedule ==
All times are British Summer Time (UTC+1)

Date	Time	Round
2 August 2014	10:05	Preliminaries
2 August 2014	18:05	Finals

== Format ==
The 14 divers will dive compete in a preliminary round, with each driver making six dives. The 12 best divers will advance to the final round during the evening session, where all previous scores will be cleared.

== Results ==
Green denotes finalists

Rank	Diver	Preliminary		Final	
Rank	Diver	Points	Rank	Points	Rank
Gold medal	Esther Qin (AUS)	324.60	3	347.25	1
Silver medal	Jennifer Abel (CAN)	336.90	1	324.70	2
Bronze medal	Hannah Starling (ENG)	311.05	4	316.95	3
=4	Maddison Keeney (AUS)	336.75	2	308.20	4
=4	Ng Yan Yee (MAS)	310.95	5	308.20	4
6	Pamela Ware (CAN)	289.45	9	308.10	6
7	Alicia Blagg (ENG)	300.70	6	300.95	7
8	Anabelle Smith (AUS)	290.25	8	298.95	8
9	Grace Reid (SCO)	281.80	10	297.50	9
10	Rebecca Gallantree (ENG)	266.25	11	292.20	10
11	Nur Dhabitah Sabri (MAS)	292.35	7	284.20	11
12	Cheong Jun Hoong (MAS)	257.15	12	271.95	12
13	Emma Friesen (CAN)	194.40	13		
14	Maria Zarka (TON)	184.40	14		
