= Cycling at the 2014 Commonwealth Games – Women's cross-country =

Cycling – Women's cross-country at the 2014 Commonwealth Games
- Venue: Cathkin Braes Mountain Bike Trails
- Dates: 29 July 2014
- Competitors: 21 from 11 nations
- Winning time: 1:39.29

Medalists
gold medal	Catharine Pendrel	Canada
silver medal	Emily Batty	Canada
bronze medal	Rebecca Henderson	Australia

The women's cross country mountain biking competition at the 2014 Commonwealth Games in Glasgow, Scotland was held on 29 July at the Cathkin Braes Mountain Bike Trails. Mountain biking returned to the program, after last being competed back in 2006.

== Schedule ==
All times are British Summer Time

Date	Time	Round
Tuesday 29 July 2014	12:31	Final

== Result ==
Final results:

Rank	Rider	Time
1st place, gold medalist(s)	Catharine Pendrel (CAN)	1:39.29
2nd place, silver medalist(s)	Emily Batty (CAN)	1:40.39
3rd place, bronze medalist(s)	Rebecca Henderson (AUS)	1:40.51
4	Annie Last (ENG)	1:42.34
5	Alice Barnes (ENG)	1:43.27
6	Karen Hanlen (NZL)	1:43.31
7	Lee Craigie (SCO)	1:43.36
8	Kate Fluker (NZL)	1:44.56
9	Bethany Crumpton (ENG)	1:46.04
10	Mariske Strauss (RSA)	1:47.17
11	Jessie Roberts (SCO)	1:47.32
12	Peta Mullens (AUS)	1:49.06
13	Kerry MacPhee (SCO)	1:49.48
14	Tory Thomas (AUS)	1:52.32
15	Claire Oakley (NIR)	1:58.27
16	Vera Adrian (NAM)	LAP
17	Retha Harding (SWZ)	LAP
–	Aurelie Halbwach (MRI)	DNF
–	Joyce Nyaruri (KEN)	DNF
–	Mary Mburu (KEN)	DNF
–	Mary Muchina (KEN)	DNF
