= Diving at the 2014 Commonwealth Games – Women's synchronised 10 metre platform =

Women's synchronised 10 metre platform at the 2014 Commonwealth Games
- Venue: Royal Commonwealth Pool
- Date: July 30
- Competitors: 10 from 4 nations
- Winning score: 310.65

Medalists
gold medal	Meaghan Benfeito; Roseline Filion	Canada
silver medal	Sarah Barrow; Tonia Couch	England
bronze medal	Pandelela Rinong; Nur Dhabitah Sabri	Malaysia

The women's synchronised 10 metre platform was part of the Diving at the 2014 Commonwealth Games program. The competition was held on 30 July 2014 at Royal Commonwealth Pool in Edinburgh.

== Format ==
A single round was held, with each team making five dives. Eleven judges scored each dive: three for each diver, and five for synchronisation. Only the middle score counted for each diver, with the middle three counting for synchronization. These five scores were averaged, multiplied by 3, and multiplied by the dive's degree of difficulty to give a total dive score. The scores for each of the five dives were summed to give a final score.

== Schedule ==
All times are British Summer Time (UTC+1).

Date	Start	Round
July 30	11:40	Finals

== Results ==
Results:

Rank	Nation	Dives					Total
Rank	Nation	1	2	3	4	5	Total
1st place, gold medalist(s)	Canada; Meaghan Benfeito; Roseline Filion	53.40	50.40	65.70	64.35	76.80	310.65
2nd place, silver medalist(s)	England; Sarah Barrow; Tonia Couch	52.80	52.20	66.24	66.60	70.08	307.92
3rd place, bronze medalist(s)	Malaysia; Pandelela Rinong; Nur Dhabitah Sabri	49.20	48.60	61.20	70.08	71.04	300.12
4	Malaysia; Cheong Jun Hoong; Leong Mun Yee	49.80	52.80	64.80	67.20	64.32	298.92
5	Australia; Rachel Bugg; Melissa Wu	51.00	48.00	63.90	57.60	72.00	292.50
