= Gymnastics at the 2014 Commonwealth Games – Women's balance beam =

Women's balance beam at the 2014 Commonwealth Games
- Venue: SSE Hydro
- Dates: 1 August 2014
- Competitors: 8 from 4 nations
- Winning score: 14.900

Medalists
gold medal	Ellie Black	Canada
silver medal	Mary Anne Monckton	Australia
bronze medal	Georgina Hockenhull	Wales

The women's individual balance beam competition of the 2014 Commonwealth Games took place on August 1 at the SSE Hydro arena in Glasgow, Scotland.

== Results ==
=== Qualification ===
Qualification took place on July 29 as part of the team and individual qualification event.

=== Final ===
Position	Gymnast	D Score	E Score	Penalty	Total
1st place, gold medalist(s)	Ellie Black (CAN)	6.400	8.500		14.900
2nd place, silver medalist(s)	Mary Anne Monckton (AUS)	6.000	7.666		13.666
3rd place, bronze medalist(s)	Georgina Hockenhull (WAL)	5.500	7.966		13.466
4	Elizabeth Beddoe (WAL)	5.100	8.266		13.366
5	Claudia Fragapane (ENG)	5.300	7.933		13.133
6	Lauren Mitchell (AUS)	5.900	7.000		13.000
7	Isabela Onyshko (CAN)	5.000	7.666		12.666
8	Becky Downie (ENG)	4.500	5.333		9.833
