= Emily Batty =

Canadian cross-country mountain biker (born 1988)

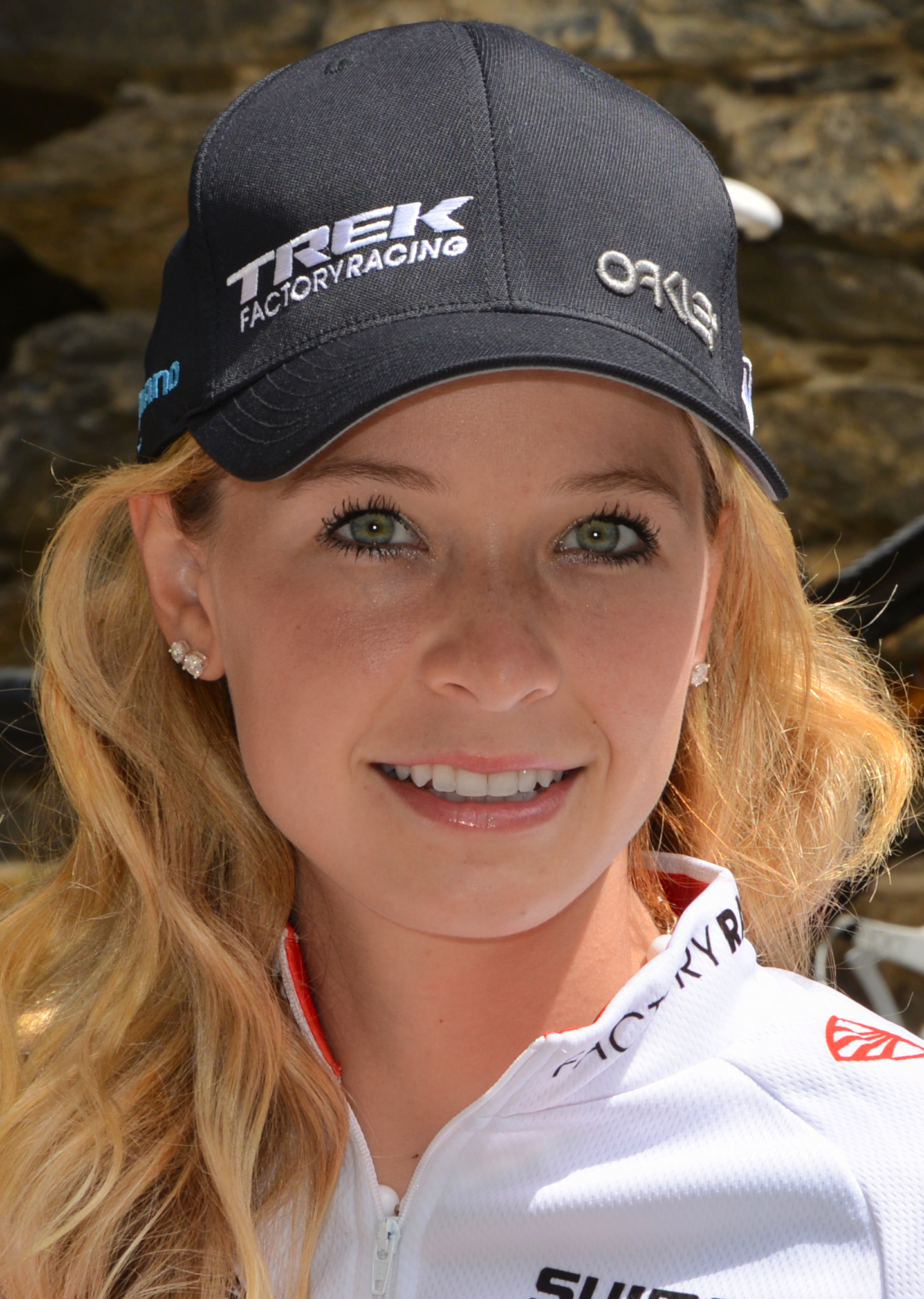
- Batty in 2013

Personal information
- Born: 16 June 1988 (age 38) Brooklin, Ontario, Canada
- Height: 1.60 m (5 ft 3 in)
- Weight: 48 kg

Cycling career
- Sport: Cycling
- Current team: Canyon MTB Racing Team
- Discipline: Mountain bike
- Role: Rider
- Rider type: Cross-country

Professional teams
- 2010–2011: Trek World Racing
- 2011–2020: Subaru-Trek
- 2021–: Canyon

Major wins
- PanAmGames (2015; 1st place)
Medal record
Representing Canada
World Championships
Bronze medal – third place	2016 Nové Mesto	Cross-country
Bronze medal – third place	2018 Lenzerheide	Cross-country
Commonwealth Games
Silver medal – second place	2014 Glasgow	Cross-country
Pan American Games
Gold medal – first place	2015 Toronto	Cross-country

Emily Batty (born 16 June 1988) is a Canadian cross-country mountain biker. She won a bronze medal at the 2016 World Championships. Batty is the current Pan American Games champion and was the silver medalist at the 2014 Commonwealth Games. She won the gold medal at the Pan Am games in Toronto in 2015 in her home country.

== Career ==
Batty started racing in 1999 and raced in the Canada Cup Series by 2001. She competed for Trek World Racing in the 2010 UCI Mountain Bike World Cup season. Batty switched to the Subaru-Trek team in 2011.

At the 2012 Summer Olympics, she competed with a broken collar bone and bruised shoulders in the Women's cross-country at Hadleigh Farm, finishing in 24th place. After the Olympics Emily broke through onto the podium at the 2014 Commonwealth Games in Glasgow. There she finished second on the podium behind teammate Catharine Pendrel. Following the race Pendrel said "I knew from training and the nationals that Emily was on fire, so I'm proud she got silver."

The next multi-games competition for the Canadian riders was the 2015 Pan American Games on home soil in Toronto. There Batty and Pendrel again found themselves in a one-two position, however this time Batty finished on top with a six-second advantage over Pendrel, winning the title of Pan Am Games champion. After the race Batty said "it's really just pushing each other. It doesn't matter who's first on the day as long as it's a Canadian. So we got gold and silver, which was amazing."

For the 2016 Summer Olympics Batty competed for Canada, coming in as World Championships bronze medallist. At the Games she finished a close fourth to teammate Pendrel. After she said "after London with a broken collarbone, to being 10 metres from a bronze medal, it is a heartbreak. My preparation was amazing. I raced clean and I rode incredibly strong and just missed a medal by a couple of bike lengths so I have some mixed emotions."

== Personal ==
Born in Brooklin, Ontario, Batty grew up in a racing family. She has two older brothers and a younger sister, all of whom race. During her competitions, Batty wears a pearl necklace discovered among her mother's jewelry when she was 11 years old. Batty raced on the team Trek Factory Racing between 2013 and 2020. For 2021 Batty will race for Canyon. She is coached by Adam Morka, who is also her husband.
