= Riley McCormick =

Canadian diver (born 1991)

Personal information
- Full name: Riley Jacob McCormick
- Born: August 25, 1991 (age 35) Victoria, British Columbia, Canada
- Home town: Tempe, Arizona, U.S.

Sport
- Country: Canada
- Events: 3 metre springboard 10 metre platform
- Club: Boardworks
- Coached by: Tommy McLeod

Riley Jacob McCormick (born August 25, 1991) is a Canadian diver. He placed 16th in the individual 10m platform event at the 2008 Summer Olympics in Beijing. He also placed 11th in the individual 10m platform event at the 2012 Summer Olympics in London. He studied at Arizona State University in Tempe, Arizona and graduated law school from the University of Illinois-Chicago. He is 5 foot 10 and was born in Victoria, British Columbia.

== Accomplishments ==
- 2014 - 2014 Commonwealth Games - 4th place - 3M springboard
- 2012 - 2012 Summer Olympics - 11th place - 10M Platform.
- 2011 - 2011 World Aquatics Championships - 9th on 10M
- 2010 - NCAA Division I Men's Swimming and Diving Championships - Runner-up on Platform 10 M
- 2010 - Canadian Winter Senior National Championships - Gold on 10M Silver on 3M Synchro (Miszkiel)
- 2009 - 2009 World Aquatics Championships - 9th on 10M
- 2008 - 2008 Summer Olympics - 16th place - 10M Platform.
- 2008 - International Lambertz-Springen - Gold on 10M
- 2008 - Winter Senior National Championships - Gold on 10M synchro (Reuben Ross), Silver on 10M
- 2007 - Pan Am Jr. Championships- Silver on 10M
- 2007 - Summer Senior National Championships - Gold on 10M
- 2007 - 2007 World Aquatics Championships - 11th on 10M
- 2006 - FINA World Junior Diving Championships - 6th on 10M
- 2006 - Speedo Junior National Championships - Silver on 1M, Gold on 3M & 10M
- 2006 - Commonwealth Games - 4th on 10M synchro (Wegadesk Gorup-Paul)
- 2005 - 2005 World Aquatics Championships - 11th on 10M synchro (Wegadesk Gorup-Paul)
- 2005 - Canada/US Challenge - Gold on 10M, Bronze on 3M
- 2004 - Speedo Junior National Championships - Gold on 3M & 10M, Silver on 1M
- 2003 - Junior Pan Am Championships – Gold on 1M & 10M, Bronze on 3M
- 2003 - Canada/US Challenge - Gold on 3M & 10M, Bronze on 1M
- 2003 - Speedo Junior National Championships - Gold on 3M & 10M, Silver on 1M
- 2002 - Speedo Junior National Championships - Gold on 1M, 3M & 10M
- 2002 - Canada/US Challenge - Gold on 3M & 10M, Silver on 1M
- 2001 - Speedo Junior National Championships - Gold on 1M, 3M, & 10M
- 2000 - Speedo Junior National Championships - Gold on 1M & 3M, 4th on 10M
