= Sam Belkin =

New Zealand wrestler

Personal information
- Full name: Sam Belkin
- Nationality: New Zealand
- Born: 18 April 1988 (age 38) Edgware, London, England

Sport
- Country: New Zealand
- Sport: Wrestling
- Event: Men's FS 97 kg
Medal record
Representing New Zealand
Men's Freestyle wrestling
Commonwealth Games
Bronze medal – third place	2014 Glasgow	97 kg
- Updated on 31 July 2014

Sam Belkin (born 18 April 1988) is a New Zealand amateur wrestler. He competed in the Men's freestyle 97 kg event at the 2014 Commonwealth Games where he won the bronze medal.
