= Vinesh =

Vinesh is a unisex given name. Notable people with the name include:

- Vinesh Antani (born 1946), Indian novelist
- Vinesh Phogat (born 1994), Indian politician and wrestler
