= Kevin Lytwyn =

Canadian artistic gymnast

- Born: 21 April 1991 (age 35) Burlington, Ontario, Canada

Gymnastics career
- Discipline: Men's artistic gymnastics
- Country represented: Canada

Kevin Lytwyn (born April 21, 1991) is a Canadian artistic gymnast. He won the silver medal in the men's horizontal bar event at the 2015 Pan American Games held in Toronto, Canada.

In 2014, he competed at the Commonwealth Games in Glasgow, Scotland. He won the silver medal in the men's rings event and the bronze medal in the men's horizontal bar event. He also won the bronze medal in the men's artistic team all-around event.
