= Andrew Yorke (triathlete) =

Canadian triathlete

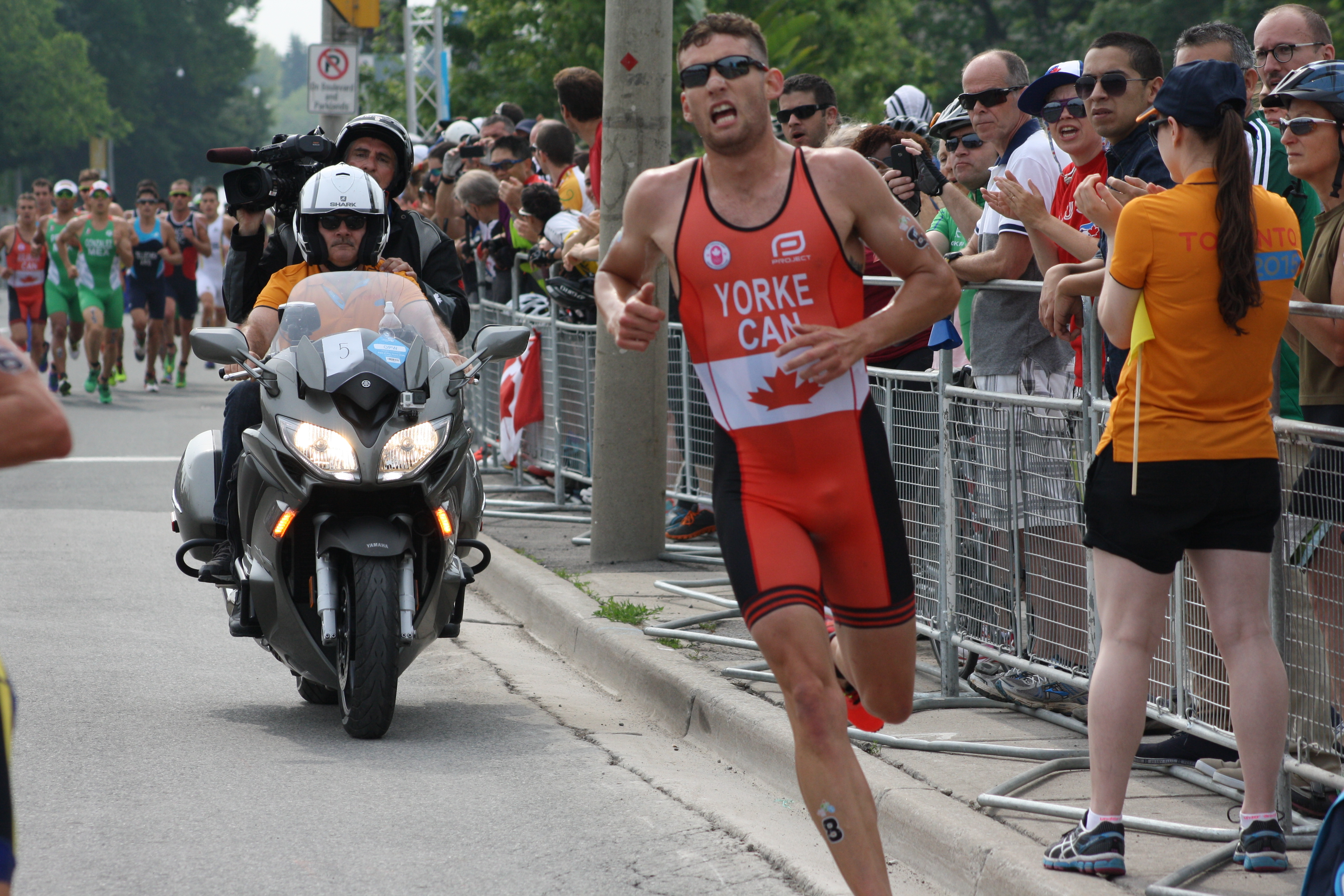

Personal information
- Born: December 20, 1988 (age 37) Caledon East, Ontario, Canada
- Height: 1.90 m (6 ft 3 in)
- Weight: 75 kg (165 lb)

Sport
- Country: Canada
- Sport: Triathlon

Andrew Yorke (born December 20, 1988) is a Canadian professional triathlete. He competed at World Series and World cup levels. He finished 4th at the 2014 Commonwealth Games and 7th at the 2015 Pan American Games.

In 2016, he was named to the Canadian Olympic team. He finished 42nd in the triathlon with a time of 1:52:46.
