= Hannah Starling =

British former diver (born 1995)

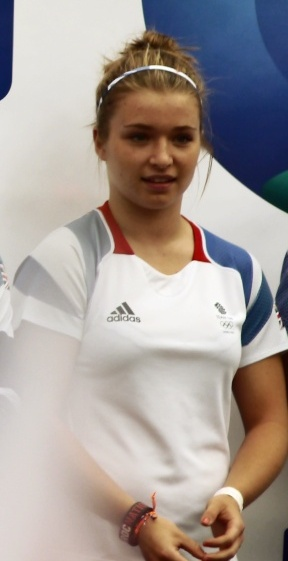
- Hannah Starling at the 2012 Summer Olympics

Personal information
- Full name: Hannah Starling
- Born: 12 June 1995 (age 31) Leeds, England
- Home town: Leeds, England
- Height: 154 cm (5 ft 1 in)

Sport
- Country: United Kingdom England
- Event: Diving
- Club: City of Leeds Diving Club

Hannah Starling (born 12 June 1995 in Leeds, England) is a British former diver. At the 2012 Summer Olympics, she competed in the Women's synchronized 3 metre springboard.

Former world champion diver Edwin Jongejans has trained her since 2004.

Starling won the synchronized 3 metre event at the British Championships in 2010 (with Grace Reid) and 2014 (with Rebecca Gallantree) and at the British National Cup in 2012 (with Rebecca Gallantree). She won the 1 metre springboard event at the British National Cup in 2011.

Starling finished in second place for the British diving team (20th overall in the world) at the 18th FINA Diving World Cup held in London, England in February 2012.

In 2014 Starling finished third in the 3 metre springboard event at the Commonwealth Games in Glasgow. She announced her retirement from the sport in 2015.

== Diving achievements ==
Competition	2009	2010	2011	2012	2014
Olympics, 3m springboard				13th	
World Championships, 1m springboard			25th		
Commonwealth Games, 3m springboard					3rd
European Championship, 1m springboard			14th		
European Championship, 3m synchro			5th		
European Championship, 3m springboard	14th		8th	9th	
FINA World Cup, 3m springboard		19th		19th	
World Junior Championship, 1m springboard		14th			
World Junior Championship, 3m synchro		8th			
European Junior Championship, 3m springboard	8th	5th			
European Junior Championship, 3m synchro	2nd	3rd			
British Championship, 3m springboard	4th	4th	3rd	3rd	2nd
British Championship, 3m synchro	4th	1st			1st
British Championship, 1m springboard	12th	11th			2nd
British Gas National Cup, 1m springboard		7th	1st	4th	
British Gas National Cup, 3m springboard		6th	3rd	2nd	
British Gas National Cup, 3m synchro		3rd	2nd	1st	
