= Matthew Sharpe (triathlete) =

Canadian triathlete

Personal information
- Born: July 24, 1991 (age 34) Campbell River, British Columbia, Canada
- Height: 195 cm (6 ft 5 in)
Medal record
Men's triathlon
Representing Canada

Matthew Sharpe (born July 24, 1991) is a Canadian triathlete. In 2021, he competed in the men's triathlon at the 2020 Summer Olympics held in Tokyo, Japan.

== Career ==
Sharpe has competed at two Commonwealth Games. In 2014, Sharpe finished 21st in the individual race and fourth in the mixed relay. In 2018, Sharpe finished ninth in the individual and fourth again in the mixed relay.

In July 2021, Sharpe was named to Canada's 2020 Olympic team.
