= Maxim Bouchard =

Canadian diver

Personal information
- Born: September 18, 1990 (age 34); LaSalle, Quebec, Canada
- Home town: Montreal, Quebec, Canada
- Height: 174 cm (5 ft 9 in)

Sport
- Country: Canada
- Club: CAMO

Maxim Bouchard (born September 18, 1990) is a Canadian diver who competes for the national team.

In June 2016, Bouchard was named to the Canadian Olympic team.

== Achievements ==
- 2013 - Summer Senior National Championships - Bronze on 10m, Gold on 10m synchro (Gagné)
- 2013 - Puerto Rico Grand Prix - Silver on 10m synchro (Gagné)
- 2013 - Winter Senior National Championships - Gold on 10m & 10m synchro (Gagné)
- 2012 - Canadian Diving Trials - 4th on 3m & 10m
- 2012 - Winter Senior National Championships - Bronze on 10m
- 2008 - Speedo Junior National Championships - Silver on 3m, Bronze on 1m & 10m
- 2007 - Speedo Junior National Championships - Silver on 1m & 3m
- 2006 - Speedo Junior National Championships - Silver on 1m, Gold on 3m, Silver on 10m
- 2005 - Pan Am Junior Diving Championships - Gold on 1m & 10m, Silver on 3m
- 2005 - Speedo Junior National Championships - Gold on 1m, Silver on 3m, Gold on 10m
- 2005 - Canada Cup - 21st on 10m
- 2004 - Speedo Junior National Championships - Gold on 3m & 10m, Silver on 1m
