= Golf at the 2016 Summer Olympics – Women's individual =

Women's golf at the Games of the XXXI Olympiad
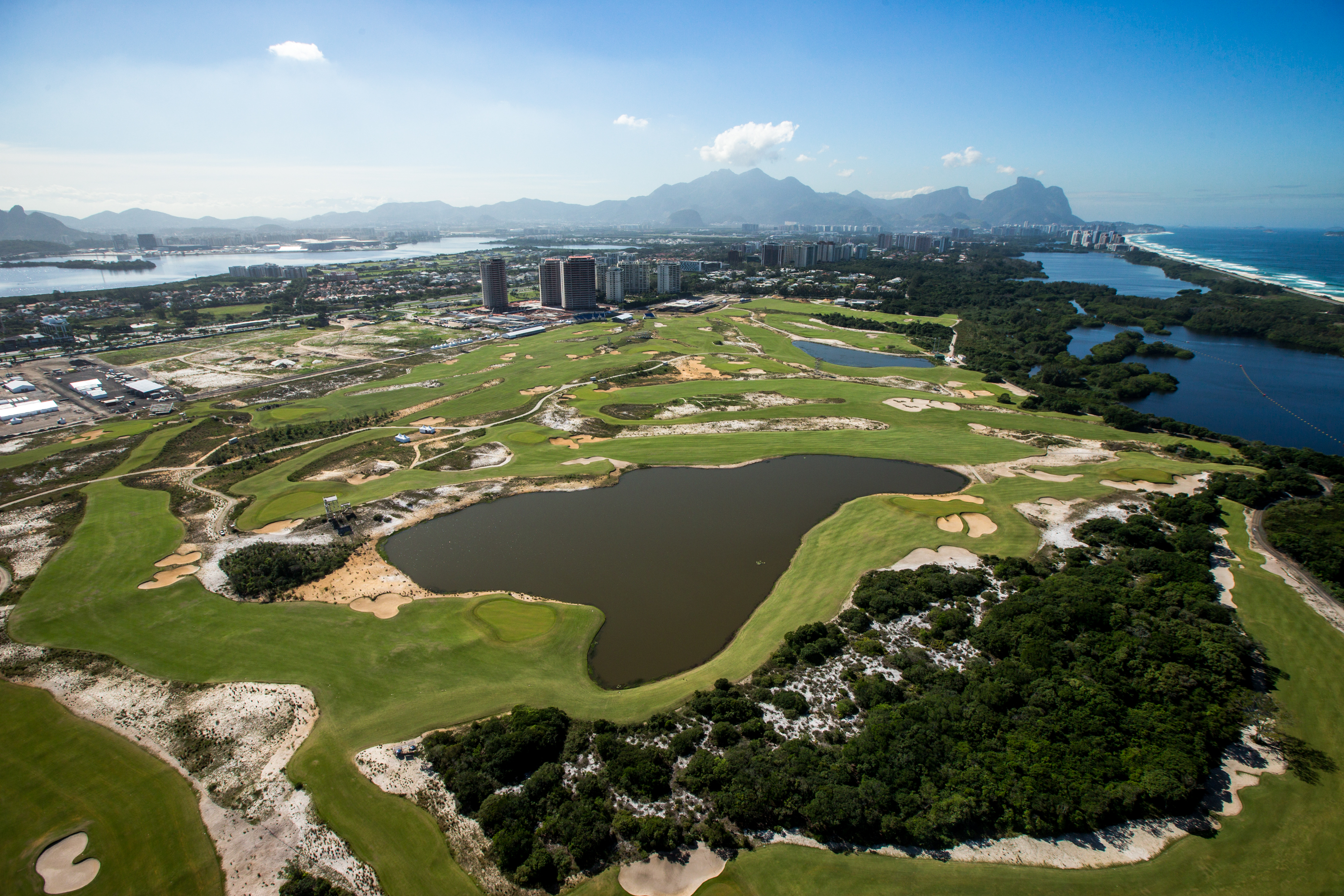
- View of the Olympic Golf Course in Barra da Tijuca, the venue of the women's golf tournament.
- Venue: Olympic Golf Course
- Dates: 17–20 August 2016
- Competitors: 60 from 34 nations
- Winning score: 268 (−16)

Medalists
1st place, gold medalist(s)		Inbee Park	South Korea
2nd place, silver medalist(s)		Lydia Ko	New Zealand
3rd place, bronze medalist(s)		Shanshan Feng	China

The women's golf tournament at the 2016 Summer Olympics was played at the Olympic Golf Course (Portuguese: Campo Olímpico de Golfe), built within the Reserva de Marapendi in the Barra da Tijuca zone, between 17 and 20 August 2016. It was the first women's golf tournament at the Olympics since 1900.

Sixty players played four rounds of stroke play. The field included 57 professionals and three amateurs.

The event was won by Inbee Park of South Korea with a score −16, defeating Lydia Ko from New Zealand and China's Shanshan Feng who won silver and bronze respectively.

The medals were presented by Dick Pound, IOC member, Canada and Antony Scanlon, Secretary General of the IGF.

== Background ==
The first Olympic golf tournaments took place at the second modern Games in Paris 1900. Men's and women's events were held. Golf was featured again at the next Games, St. Louis 1904 with men's events (an individual tournament as well as a team event). The 1908 Games in London were also supposed to have a men's golf competition, but a dispute led to a boycott by all of the host nation's golfers, leaving only a single international competitor and resulting in the cancellation of the event. Golf would disappear from the Olympic programme from then until returning with this event.

While many of the top male players withdrew over concerns about Zika fever, few women did. The field included the top 9 ranked golfers, led by #1-ranked Lydia Ko of New Zealand.

32 of the 34 participating nations were making their debut. The United States and France were the only two nations to have competed at the only previous edition of the event, in 1900; both made their second appearance in 2016.

== Qualification ==
Countries were permitted to qualify up to four athletes based on the world rankings. South Korea was the only nation to qualify all four athletes. The top 60 golfers, subject to limits per nation and guarantees for the host and continental representation, were selected. A nation could have three or four golfers if they were all in the top 15 of the rankings; otherwise, each nation was limited to two golfers. One spot was guaranteed for the host nation and five spots were guaranteed to ensure that each Olympic continent had at least one representative. Neither the host nor the continental guarantees turned out to be necessary, with Brazil qualifying 2 golfers and each continent having at least 3 golfers qualified.

== Competition format ==
The tournament was a four-round stroke play tournament, with the lowest score over the total 72 holes winning.

== Schedule ==
All times are Brasília Time (UTC-03:00)

Date	Time	Round
Wednesday, 17 August 2016		First round
Thursday, 18 August 2016		Second round
Friday, 19 August 2016		Third round
Saturday, 20 August 2016		Final round

== Results ==
=== First round ===
Wednesday, 17 August 2016

Ariya Jutanugarn of Thailand shot a 6-under-par 65 to lead by one stroke over South Koreans Kim Sei-young and Inbee Park.

Rank	Player	Nation	Score	To par
1	Ariya Jutanugarn	Thailand	65	−6
T2	Kim Sei-young	South Korea	66	−5
T2	Inbee Park	South Korea	66	−5
T4	Nicole Broch Larsen	Denmark	67	−4
T4	Carlota Ciganda	Spain	67	−4
T4	Candie Kung	Chinese Taipei	67	−4
T7	Aditi Ashok	India	68	−3
T7	Charley Hull	Great Britain	68	−3
T7	Azahara Muñoz	Spain	68	−3
T7	Lexi Thompson	United States	68	−3

=== Second round ===
Thursday, 18 August 2016

Inbee Park of South Korea shot a second straight round of 66 to take the lead at 10-under-par, 132. Stacy Lewis of the United States shot the low round of the day, an 8-under-par 63, to climb to second place, one stroke behind Park. First round leader Ariya Jutanugarn of Thailand shot an even-par 71 to drop to a tie for 8th.

Rank	Player	Nation	Score	To par
1	Inbee Park	South Korea	66-66=132	−10
2	Stacy Lewis	United States	70-63=133	−9
T3	Brooke Henderson	Canada	70-64=134	−8
T3	Charley Hull	Great Britain	68-66=134	−8
T5	Nicole Broch Larsen	Denmark	67-68=135	−7
T5	Candie Kung	Chinese Taipei	67-68=135	−7
T5	Marianne Skarpnord	Norway	69-66=135	−7
T8	Aditi Ashok	India	68-68=136	−6
T8	Chun In-gee	South Korea	70-66=136	−6
T8	Ariya Jutanugarn	Thailand	65-71=136	−6
T8	Minjee Lee	Australia	69-67=136	−6
T8	Gerina Piller	United States	69-67=136	−6

=== Third round ===
Friday, 19 August 2016

Inbee Park of South Korea maintained her lead by shooting a 1-under-par 70. Lydia Ko shot the low round of the day, a 6-under-par 65 to move into a tie for second place with American Gerina Piller. First round leader Ariya Jutanugarn withdrew after 13 holes with a knee injury.

Rank	Player	Nation	Score	To par
1	Inbee Park	South Korea	66-66-70=202	−11
T2	Lydia Ko	New Zealand	69-70-65=204	−9
T2	Gerina Piller	United States	69-67-68=204	−9
4	Shanshan Feng	China	70-67-68=205	−8
T5	Chun In-gee	South Korea	70-66-72=208	−5
T5	Charley Hull	Great Britain	68-66-74=208	−5
T5	Amy Yang	South Korea	73-65-70=208	−5
T8	Brooke Henderson	Canada	70-64-75=209	−4
T8	Minjee Lee	Australia	69-67-73=209	−4
T8	Stacy Lewis	United States	70-63-76=209	−4
T8	Anna Nordqvist	Sweden	71-70-68=209	−4
T8	Su-Hyun Oh	Australia	71-72-66=209	−4
T8	Suzann Pettersen	Norway	71-69-69=209	−4
T8	Paula Reto	South Africa	74-67-68=209	−4

=== Final round ===
Saturday, 20 August 2016

Inbee Park shot her third five-under-par 66 of the tournament to win the gold medal. Lydia Ko (silver) and Shanshan Feng (bronze) of China joined Park in the medals with final rounds of two-under-par 69.

Rank	Player	Nation	Rd 1	Rd 2	Rd 3	Rd 4	Total	To par
1st place, gold medalist(s)	Inbee Park	South Korea	66	66	70	66	268	−16
2nd place, silver medalist(s)	Lydia Ko	New Zealand	69	70	65	69	273	−11
3rd place, bronze medalist(s)	Shanshan Feng	China	70	67	68	69	274	−10
4	Stacy Lewis	United States	70	63	76	66	275	−9
4	Haru Nomura	Japan	69	69	72	65	275	−9
4	Amy Yang	South Korea	73	65	70	67	275	−9
7	Brooke Henderson	Canada	70	64	75	67	276	−8
7	Charley Hull	Great Britain	68	66	74	68	276	−8
7	Minjee Lee	Australia	69	67	73	67	276	−8
10	Suzann Pettersen	Norway	71	69	69	68	277	−7
11	Anna Nordqvist	Sweden	71	70	68	69	278	−6
11	Gerina Piller	United States	69	67	68	74	278	−6
13	Chun In-gee	South Korea	70	66	72	71	279	−5
13	Nanna Koerstz Madsen	Denmark	69	69	72	69	279	−5
13	Su-Hyun Oh	Australia	71	72	66	70	279	−5
16	Teresa Lu	Chinese Taipei	70	67	73	70	280	−4
16	Paula Reto	South Africa	74	67	68	71	280	−4
16	Maria Verchenova	Russia	75	70	73	62	280	−4
19	Lexi Thompson	United States	68	71	76	66	281	−3
19	Mariajo Uribe	Colombia	70	71	75	66	281	−3
21	Leona Maguire (a)	Ireland	74	65	74	69	282	−2
21	Caroline Masson	Germany	69	69	75	69	282	−2
21	Azahara Muñoz	Spain	68	69	73	72	282	−2
21	Albane Valenzuela (a)	Switzerland	71	68	72	71	282	−2
25	Sandra Gal	Germany	71	74	69	69	283	−1
25	Kim Sei-young	South Korea	66	73	73	71	283	−1
25	Pornanong Phatlum	Thailand	71	72	69	71	283	−1
25	Marianne Skarpnord	Norway	69	66	75	73	283	−1
29	Catriona Matthew	Great Britain	71	66	77	70	284	E
30	Alena Sharp	Canada	72	69	75	69	285	+1
31	Laetitia Beck	Israel	75	70	71	70	286	+2
31	Candie Kung	Chinese Taipei	67	68	76	75	286	+2
31	Pernilla Lindberg	Sweden	74	73	69	70	286	+2
31	Gaby López	Mexico	71	67	76	72	286	+2
31	Stephanie Meadow	Ireland	77	66	71	72	286	+2
36	Nicole Broch Larsen	Denmark	67	68	81	71	287	+3
37	Tiffany Chan (a)	Hong Kong	71	75	73	69	288	+4
38	Xi Yu Lin	China	72	74	74	69	289	+5
39	Carlota Ciganda	Spain	67	72	78	73	290	+6
39	Gwladys Nocera	France	73	71	74	72	290	+6
41	Aditi Ashok	India	68	68	79	76	291	+7
42	Shiho Oyama	Japan	70	71	77	74	292	+8
43	Christine Wolf	Austria	71	69	77	76	293	+9
44	Julieta Granada	Paraguay	71	69	76	78	294	+10
44	Karine Icher	France	73	72	73	76	294	+10
44	Alejandra Llaneza	Mexico	73	68	73	80	294	+10
44	Ursula Wikström	Finland	69	71	81	73	294	+10
48	Klára Spilková	Czech Republic	77	73	71	74	295	+11
48	Noora Tamminen	Finland	73	76	72	74	295	+11
50	Ashleigh Simon	South Africa	75	69	77	75	296	+12
51	Kelly Tan	Malaysia	78	70	76	73	297	+13
52	Miriam Nagl	Brazil	79	77	72	70	298	+14
53	Victoria Lovelady	Brazil	79	75	76	70	300	+16
53	Giulia Molinaro	Italy	78	78	74	70	300	+16
55	Giulia Sergas	Italy	77	74	77	74	302	+18
56	Chloe Leurquin	Belgium	79	78	71	75	303	+19
57	Fabienne In-Albon	Switzerland	74	78	75	79	306	+22
58	Michelle Koh	Malaysia	79	71	76	82	308	+24
59	Maha Haddioui	Morocco	82	76	80	77	315	+31
—	Ariya Jutanugarn	Thailand	65	71	DNF	DNF	136	−6
