= Golf at the 2016 Summer Olympics =

Golf at the Games of the XXXI Olympiad
- Venue: Olympic golf course, Reserva de Marapendi, Barra da Tijuca, Rio de Janeiro, Brazil
- Dates: 11–14 August 2016 (men); 17–20 August 2016 (women)
- No. of events: 2
- Competitors: 120 from 41 nations

Golf at the 2016 Summer Olympics in Rio de Janeiro, Brazil, was held in August at the new Olympic Golf Course (Portuguese: Campo Olímpico de Golfe), built within the Reserva de Marapendi in the Barra da Tijuca zone.

The 2016 Summer Olympics was the first time golf had been played at the Olympics since the 1904 Summer Olympics and featured two events: the men's and women's individual events.

== Changes ==
Though golf had not featured in the Olympics since the 1904 Summer Olympics, the session of the 121st IOC Session held in 2009 chose to re-introduce the sport for the games. With the rapid expansion and globalisation of the sport, the 121st International Olympic Committee recommended adding golf back into the Summer Olympics.

Ty Votaw, who was the Executive Vice President of Communications and International Affairs and Vice President of the International Golf Federation, along with Peter Dawson, who was the president of the IGF and chief executive of The R&A, were at the forefront of making golf an Olympic sport once again.

Before the vote to reinstate golf into the 2016 and 2020 Summer Olympic Games, a presentation by a group of golf ambassadors helped sway the 121st session of the International Olympic Committee. These ambassadors included Dawson and Votaw, along with four pro golfers: three-time major champion Pádraig Harrington of Ireland, Michelle Wie of the United States, Women's PGA Champion Suzann Pettersen of Norway and 16-year-old 2009 British Amateur champion Matteo Manassero of Italy. On 9 October 2009, the International Olympic Committee had their final vote and the vote passed, which officially made golf an Olympic sport for the 2016 and 2020 Summer games.

== Format ==
The 120 (60 men and women) competitors played two separate (one for men, one for women) 72-hole (i.e. 4 rounds of 18 holes) individual stroke play tournaments under the official rules of golf. In the event of a tie for any of the first three positions, a three-hole playoff would have determined the medal winners.

== Scorecard (metres) ==
Olympic Golf Course
Tee	Rating/Slope	1	2	3	4	5	6	7	8	9	Out	10	11	12	13	14	15	16	17	18	In	Total
Par		5	4	4	3	5	3	4	3	4	35	5	4	4	4	3	4	4	3	5	36	71
Men (m)		552	444	321	175	500	179	451	157	337	3,116	539	446	470	438	209	377	277	122	522	3,400	6,516
Women (m)		490	398	294	142	451	162	374	141	296	2,748	481	384	393	373	174	342	241	110	465	2,963	5,711

== Scorecard (yards) ==
Olympic Golf Course
Tee	Rating/Slope	1	2	3	4	5	6	7	8	9	Out	10	11	12	13	14	15	16	17	18	In	Total
Par		5	4	4	3	5	3	4	3	4	35	5	4	4	4	3	4	4	3	5	36	71
Men (yd)		604	486	351	191	547	196	493	172	369	3,409	590	488	514	479	229	412	303	133	571	3,719	7,128
Women (yd)		536	435	321	155	493	177	409	154	324	3,004	526	420	430	408	190	374	264	120	509	3,241	6,245

== Location ==
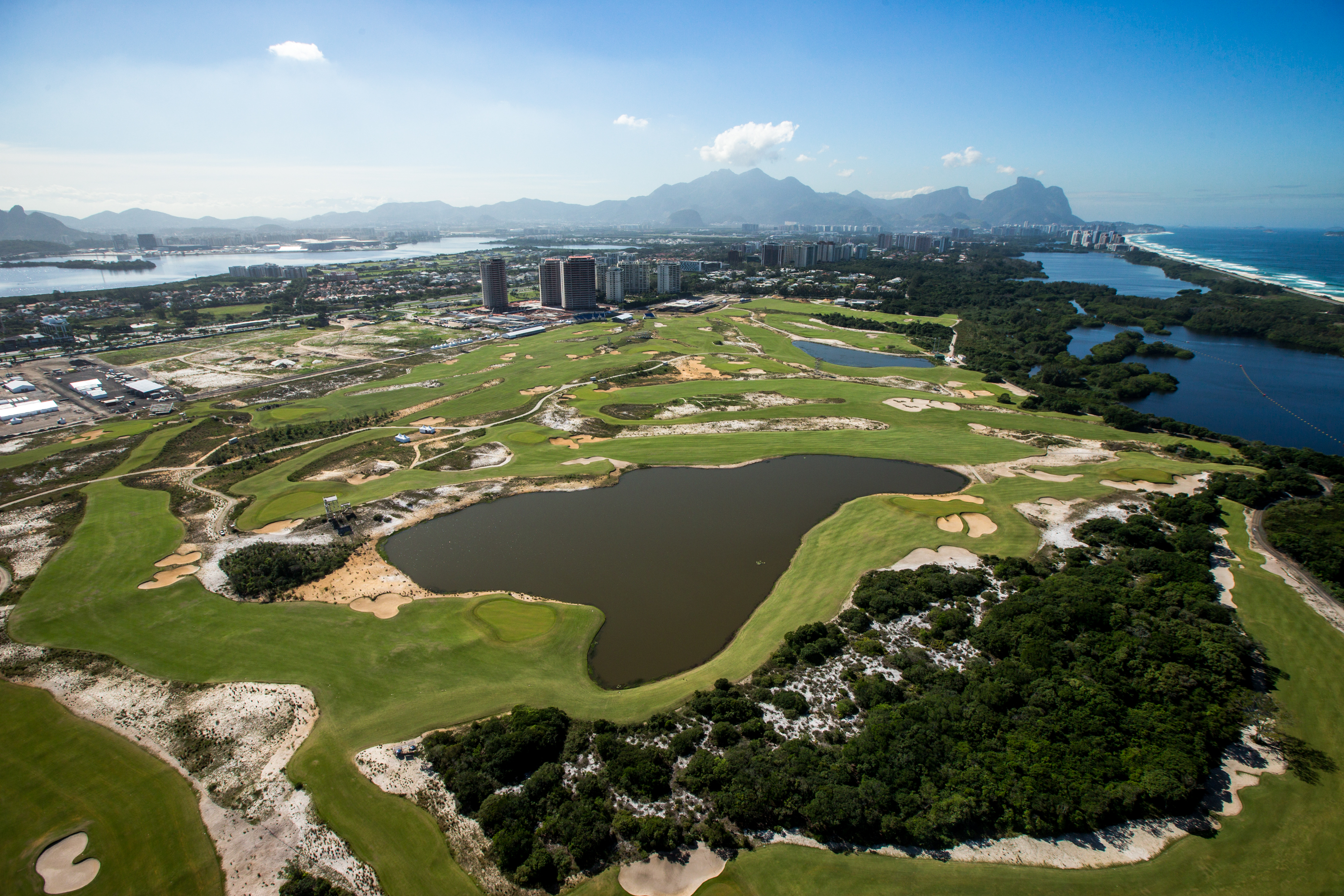
The golf course as of December 2015. The surrounding Reserva de Marapendi seen in the foreground and at right.

The new Olympic golf course was built at the Reserva de Marapendi in the Barra da Tijuca zone. Hanse Golf Course Design was chosen from eight contenders to build the course. Founder and President Gil Hanse reacted to the news in saying: "I'm excited that the selection panel felt that our efforts were the ones that best matched the criteria set by organisers." They have signed up with World Golf Hall of Famer Amy Alcott to work on the project.

The president of the Rio 2016 Organising Committee for the Olympic and Paralympic Games, Carlos Arthur Nuzman, said: "As [the 2016 Games] marks the return of golf to the Olympic Games after over a century of absence, this course represents the beginning of a new chapter in the history of the sport. It will enable Rio to host important events in the international calendar, and it would be an example of sustainability and preservation of an environmentally protected area. This course will be an excellent facility for the practice and development of golf and will inspire millions of youth across Brazil and the globe. We look forward to welcoming the athletes and spectators to the course in 2016."

After the games, the course would become a public facility and would be used to enhance golf's profile within Brazil; according to the organising committee, this would represent "one of the most important Olympic Games legacies for sport development in the country."

The Olympic Committee said that one of their goals for the Olympics was to create an environmentally sustainable Games. In building the golf course, the grass selection was critical for sustainability and water use. The quality of the water as an irrigation source for the course was in question, so the grasses selected had to be salt-tolerant. The grass sprigged on the greens of the course was SeaDwarf Seashore Paspalum, a highly salt-tolerant grass variety. The grass planted on the tees and fairways is Zeon Zoysia, developed by Bladerunner Farms in Poteet, Texas. Zeon Zoysia is a warm-season turfgrass that requires little fertilizer and minimal maintenance. Both kinds of grass were grown on a sod farm in Brazil at Green Grass Brasil. The sod farm was a licensed producer of both grass varieties.

== Competition schedule ==
The men's competition was scheduled for 11–14 August and the women's for 17–20 August.

== Qualification ==
Qualification was based on world ranking as of 11 July 2016, with a total of 60 players qualifying in each of the men's and women's events. The top 15 players of each gender will qualify, with a limit of four golfers per country that can qualify this way. The remaining spots will go the highest-ranked players from countries that do not already have two golfers qualified. The IGF has guaranteed that at least one golfer from the host nation and each geographical region (Africa, the Americas, Asia, Europe, and Oceania) will qualify. The IGF posts weekly lists of qualifiers based on current rankings for men and women.

A number of golfers withdrew, for reasons including the Zika virus epidemic and their schedules, while others were not selected by their national Olympic committee. Top male golfers withdrew in larger numbers than top female golfers. Missing eligible golfers, with their rankings at the qualification date, were:

- Men: Jason Day (1), Dustin Johnson (2), Jordan Spieth (3), Rory McIlroy (4), Adam Scott (8), Branden Grace (10), Louis Oosthuizen (14), Hideki Matsuyama (17), Charl Schwartzel (21), Shane Lowry (27), Kim Kyung-tae (41), Marc Leishman (45), Francesco Molinari (56), Hideto Tanihara (69), Graeme McDowell (74), Victor Dubuisson (78), Matt Jones (84), Vijay Singh (116), Camilo Villegas (314), Angelo Que (320), Brendon de Jonge (329)
- Women: Lee-Anne Pace (39), Christel Boeljon (121), Anne van Dam (366), Dewi Schreefel (406), Cathryn Bristow (446), Dottie Ardina (509)

Both male and female golfers cited the Zika virus as cause to withdraw from the Games. The virus can live longer in semen than in blood and might thus infect a male golfer's partner for up to six months later or even more, and therefore also cause birth defects this way. Other reasons for the withdrawals have been suggested.

== Participating nations ==
Each country qualified from one to seven athletes based on World Rankings.

- Argentina (2)
- Australia (4)
- Austria (2)
- Bangladesh (1)
- Belgium (3)
- Brazil (3)
- Canada (4)
- Chile (1)
- China (4)
- Chinese Taipei (4)
- Colombia (1)
- Czech Republic (1)
- Denmark (4)
- Finland (4)
- France (4)
- Germany (4)
- Great Britain (4)
- Hong Kong (1)
- India (3)
- Ireland (4)
- Israel (1)
- Italy (4)
- Japan (4)
- Malaysia (4)
- Mexico (3)
- Morocco (1)
- Netherlands (1)
- New Zealand (3)
- Norway (3)
- Paraguay (2)
- Philippines (1)
- Portugal (2)
- Russia (1)
- South Africa (4)
- South Korea (6)
- Spain (4)
- Sweden (4)
- Switzerland (2)
- Thailand (4)
- United States (7)
- Venezuela (1)

== Events ==
=== Medal summary ===
Rank	Nation	Gold	Silver	Bronze	Total
1	Great Britain	1	0	0	1
1	South Korea	1	0	0	1
3	New Zealand	0	1	0	1
3	Sweden	0	1	0	1
5	China	0	0	1	1
5	United States	0	0	1	1
Totals (6 entries)		2	2	2	6

=== Medalists ===
Event	Gold	Silver	Bronze
Men's individual	Justin Rose; Great Britain	Henrik Stenson; Sweden	Matt Kuchar; United States
Women's individual	Inbee Park; South Korea	Lydia Ko; New Zealand	Shanshan Feng; China
