= Golf at the 2016 Summer Olympics – Men's individual =

Olympic golf event

Men's golf at the Games of the XXXI Olympiad
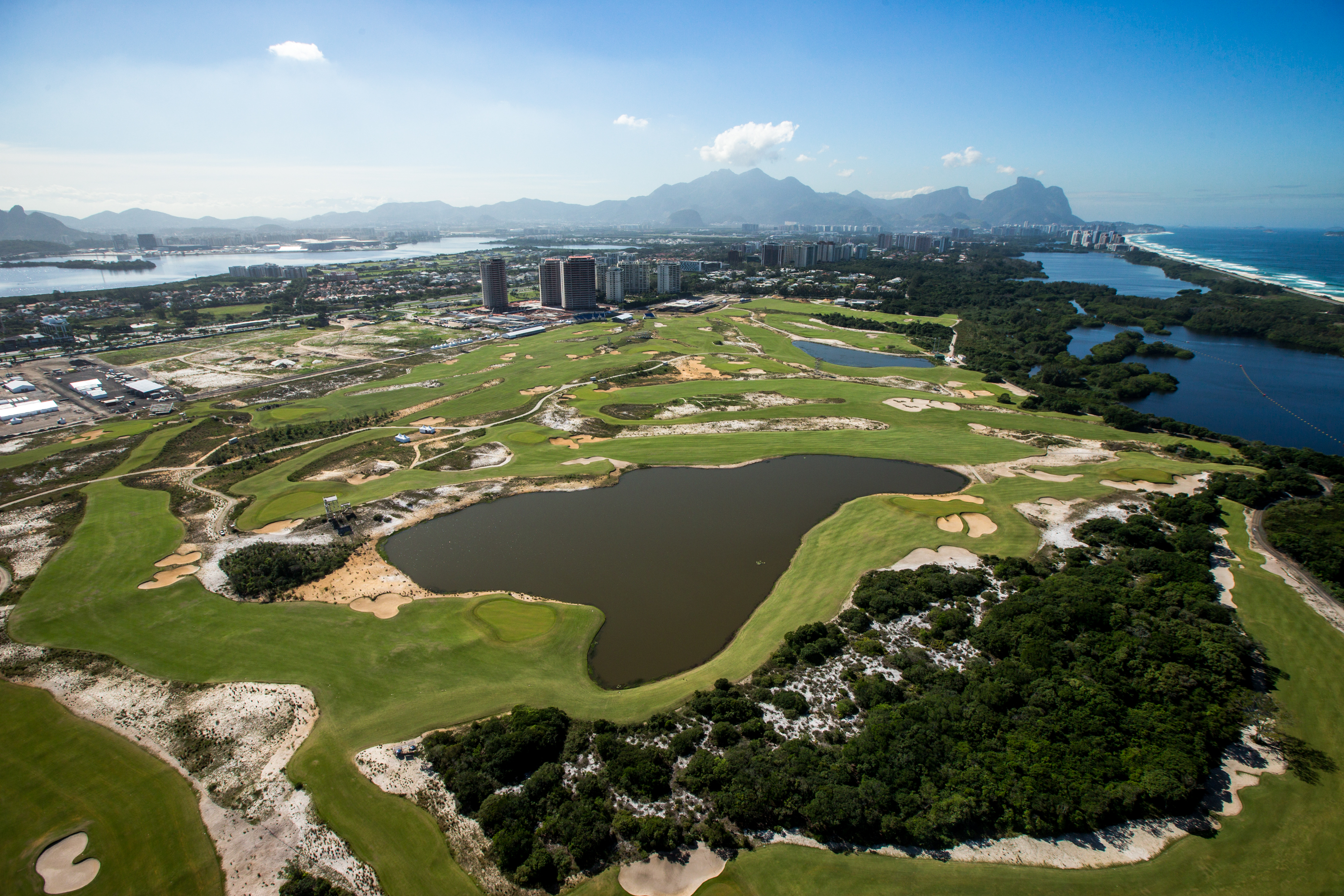
- View of the Olympic Golf Course in Barra da Tijuca, the venue of the men's golf tournament.
- Venue: Olympic Golf Course
- Dates: 11–14 August 2016
- Competitors: 60 from 34 nations
- Winning score: 268 (−16)

Medalists
1st place, gold medalist(s)		Justin Rose	Great Britain
2nd place, silver medalist(s)		Henrik Stenson	Sweden
3rd place, bronze medalist(s)		Matt Kuchar	United States

The men's golf tournament at the 2016 Summer Olympics took place at the Olympic Golf Course (Portuguese: Campo Olímpico de Golfe), built within the Reserva de Marapendi in the Barra da Tijuca zone, between 11 and 14 August 2016. It was the first such tournament in 112 years.

Sixty players took part in four rounds of stroke play. Justin Rose of Great Britain won the gold medal by two strokes over silver medalist Henrik Stenson of Sweden. It was the first gold medal for Great Britain (which had previously earned silver and bronze in 1900) and first medal of any color for Sweden, making its debut in the event. Matt Kuchar of the United States was one stroke behind Stenson and won the bronze medal. This put the American podium streak at 3 Games—and 116 years—long.

The tournament carried Official World Golf Ranking points. Rose went from 12th to 9th in the rankings as a result while Stenson went from 5th to 4th and Kuchar went from 20th to 15th.

== Background ==
The first Olympic golf tournaments took place at the second modern Games in Paris 1900. Men's and women's events were held. Golf was featured again at the next Games, St. Louis 1904 with men's events (an individual tournament as well as a team event). The 1908 Games in London were also supposed to have a men's golf competition, but a dispute led to a boycott by all of the host nation's golfers, leaving only a single international competitor and resulting in the cancellation of the event. Golf would disappear from the Olympic programme from then until returning with this event.

Many of the top players withdrew over concerns about Zika fever. Bubba Watson, the world number 5, was the highest-ranked golfer to compete.

30 of the 34 participating nations were making their debut. The United States was the only nation to have previously competed at both of the men's individual golf tournaments in 1900 and 1904, making its third appearance in 2016. Canada (1904), France (1900), and Great Britain (1900) had each competed once previously, making their second appearance here.

== Qualification ==
Each country qualified from one to four athletes based on World Rankings. The top 60 golfers, subject to limits per nation and guarantees for the host and continental representation, were selected. A nation could have three or four golfers if they were all in the top 15 of the rankings; otherwise, each nation was limited to two golfers. One spot was guaranteed for the host nation and five spots were guaranteed to ensure that each Olympic continent had at least one representative. Neither the host nor the continental guarantees turned out to be necessary, with Brazil qualifying one golfers normally and each continent having at least two golfers qualified.

== Competition format ==
The tournament was a four-round stroke play tournament, with the lowest score over the total 72 holes winning.

== Schedule ==
Date	Round
Thursday, 11 August 2016	First round
Friday, 12 August 2016	Second round
Saturday, 13 August 2016	Third round
Sunday, 14 August 2016	Final round

== Results ==
=== First round ===
Thursday, 11 August 2016

Marcus Fraser of Australia recorded nine birdies on his way to a round of 63 (−8) and a three-shot lead. Justin Rose of Great Britain became the first player to make a hole-in-one at the Games.

Rank	Player	Nation	Score	To par
1	Marcus Fraser	Australia	63	−8
T2	Graham DeLaet	Canada	66	−5
T2	Henrik Stenson	Sweden	66	−5
T4	Thomas Pieters	Belgium	67	−4
T4	Grégory Bourdy	France	67	−4
T4	Alex Čejka	Germany	67	−4
T4	Justin Rose	Great Britain	67	−4
T4	Rafa Cabrera-Bello	Spain	67	−4
T9	An Byeong-hun	South Korea	68	−3
T9	Nicolas Colsaerts	Belgium	68	−3

=== Second round ===
Friday, 12 August 2016

Marcus Fraser of Australia carded four birdies and two bogeys for a round of 69 (−2) and saw his lead reduced to one shot.

Rank	Player	Nation	Score	To par
1	Marcus Fraser	Australia	63-69=132	−10
2	Thomas Pieters	Belgium	67-66=133	−9
3	Henrik Stenson	Sweden	66-68=134	−8
T4	Grégory Bourdy	France	67-69=136	−6
T4	Justin Rose	Great Britain	67-69=136	−6
T6	Rafa Cabrera-Bello	Spain	67-70=137	−5
T6	Graham DeLaet	Canada	66-71=137	−5
T6	Danny Lee	New Zealand	72-65=137	−5
T6	Fabián Gómez	Argentina	70-67=137	−5
T10	Pan Cheng-tsung	Chinese Taipei	69-69=138	−4
T10	Thorbjørn Olesen	Denmark	70-68=138	−4
T10	Alex Čejka	Germany	67-71=138	−4
T10	Séamus Power	Ireland	71-67=138	−4

=== Third round ===
Saturday, 13 August 2016

Rose fired a 65 (−6) including two eagles to take a one-shot lead over world number five Henrik Stenson into the final round. South Africa's Jaco van Zyl, meanwhile, made a hole in one of his own at the 8th.

Rank	Player	Nation	Score	To par
1	Justin Rose	Great Britain	67-69-65=201	−12
2	Henrik Stenson	Sweden	66-68-68=202	−11
3	Marcus Fraser	Australia	63-69-72=204	−9
T4	Bubba Watson	United States	73-67-67=207	−6
T4	David Lingmerth	Sweden	69-70-68=207	−6
T4	Emiliano Grillo	Argentina	70-69-68=207	−6
T7	Mikko Ilonen	Finland	73-69-66=208	−5
T7	Pádraig Harrington	Ireland	70-71-67=208	−5
T7	Matt Kuchar	United States	69-70-69=208	−5
T7	Grégory Bourdy	France	67-69-72=208	−5
T7	Rafa Cabrera-Bello	Spain	67-70-71=208	−5

=== Final round ===
Sunday, 14 August 2016

Rose and Stenson continued to battle in the final group of the day and were tied at −15 going to the 18th. Rose then produced a backspin approach that left him with a 2.5-foot putt, and Stenson underhit his approach and eventually three-putted for bogey, leaving Rose with two putts to win the gold. He made the first for birdie to secure the win, becoming the first golfer to win Olympic gold in 112 years.

It was Rose's first tournament win in 10 months, having won the UBS Hong Kong Open the previous October. American Matt Kuchar, who had entered the final round tied for seventh, shot a 63 (−8) to take bronze.

Rank	Player	Nation	Rd 1	Rd 2	Rd 3	Rd 4	Total	To par
1st place, gold medalist(s)	Justin Rose	Great Britain	67	69	65	67	268	−16
2nd place, silver medalist(s)	Henrik Stenson	Sweden	66	68	68	68	270	−14
3rd place, bronze medalist(s)	Matt Kuchar	United States	69	70	69	63	271	−13
4	Thomas Pieters	Belgium	67	66	77	65	275	−9
T5	Marcus Fraser	Australia	63	69	72	72	276	−8
T5	Rafa Cabrera-Bello	Spain	67	70	71	68	276	−8
T5	Kiradech Aphibarnrat	Thailand	71	69	69	67	276	−8
T8	Emiliano Grillo	Argentina	70	69	68	70	277	−7
T8	Bubba Watson	United States	73	67	67	70	277	−7
T8	Sergio García	Spain	69	72	70	66	277	−7
T11	An Byeong-hun	South Korea	68	72	70	68	278	−6
T11	David Lingmerth	Sweden	69	70	68	71	278	−6
T11	Patrick Reed	United States	72	69	73	64	278	−6
T11	Bernd Wiesberger	Austria	74	67	69	68	278	−6
T15	Fabián Gómez	Argentina	70	67	73	69	279	−5
T15	Thongchai Jaidee	Thailand	70	75	67	67	279	−5
T15	Martin Kaymer	Germany	69	72	72	66	279	−5
T15	Séamus Power	Ireland	71	67	74	67	279	−5
T15	Fabrizio Zanotti	Paraguay	70	74	68	67	279	−5
20	Graham DeLaet	Canada	66	71	74	69	280	−4
T21	Grégory Bourdy	France	67	69	72	73	281	−3
T21	Alex Čejka	Germany	67	71	74	69	281	−3
T21	Pádraig Harrington	Ireland	70	71	67	73	281	−3
T21	Yuta Ikeda	Japan	74	69	69	69	281	−3
T21	Søren Kjeldsen	Denmark	73	68	70	70	281	−3
T21	Mikko Ilonen	Finland	73	69	66	73	281	−3
T27	Danny Lee	New Zealand	72	65	76	69	282	−2
T27	Joost Luiten	Netherlands	72	70	70	70	282	−2
T27	Matteo Manassero	Italy	69	73	71	69	282	−2
T30	Nino Bertasio	Italy	72	72	71	68	283	−1
T30	Nicolas Colsaerts	Belgium	68	71	71	73	283	−1
T30	Rodolfo Cazaubón	Mexico	76	66	68	73	283	−1
T30	David Hearn	Canada	73	70	74	66	283	−1
T30	Thorbjørn Olesen	Denmark	70	68	74	71	283	−1
T30	Pan Cheng-tsung	Chinese Taipei	69	69	71	74	283	−1
T30	Wu Ashun	China	74	71	70	68	283	−1
T37	Rickie Fowler	United States	75	71	64	74	284	E
T37	Danny Willett	Great Britain	71	70	69	74	284	E
T39	Felipe Aguilar	Chile	71	71	75	68	285	+1
T39	Adilson da Silva	Brazil	72	71	73	69	285	+1
T39	Ryan Fox	New Zealand	70	73	74	68	285	+1
T39	Scott Hend	Australia	74	69	71	71	285	+1
T43	Roope Kakko	Finland	72	76	68	70	286	+2
T43	Espen Kofstad	Norway	72	76	69	69	286	+2
T43	Wang Jeung-hun	South Korea	70	72	77	67	286	+2
T43	Jaco van Zyl	South Africa	71	74	70	71	286	+2
47	Gavin Green	Malaysia	73	74	72	68	287	+3
T48	Danny Chia	Malaysia	73	70	76	69	288	+4
T48	José-Filipe Lima	Portugal	70	70	77	71	288	+4
T50	Jhonattan Vegas	Venezuela	72	76	71	70	289	+5
T50	Shiv Chawrasia	India	71	71	69	78	289	+5
T50	Li Haotong	China	70	73	71	75	289	+5
53	Miguel Tabuena	Philippines	73	75	73	70	291	+7
54	Shingo Katayama	Japan	74	75	77	66	292	+8
T55	Julien Quesne	France	71	79	72	71	293	+9
T55	Brandon Stone	South Africa	75	72	71	75	293	+9
57	Anirban Lahiri	India	74	73	75	72	294	+10
58	Siddikur Rahman	Bangladesh	75	70	75	75	295	+11
59	Ricardo Gouveia	Portugal	73	68	76	80	297	+13
WD	Lin Wen-tang	Chinese Taipei	77	77	DNF	DNF	154	DNF
