= Olympic Golf Course =

Golf course in Rio de Janeiro, Brazil

Olympic Golf Course (Rio de Janeiro)
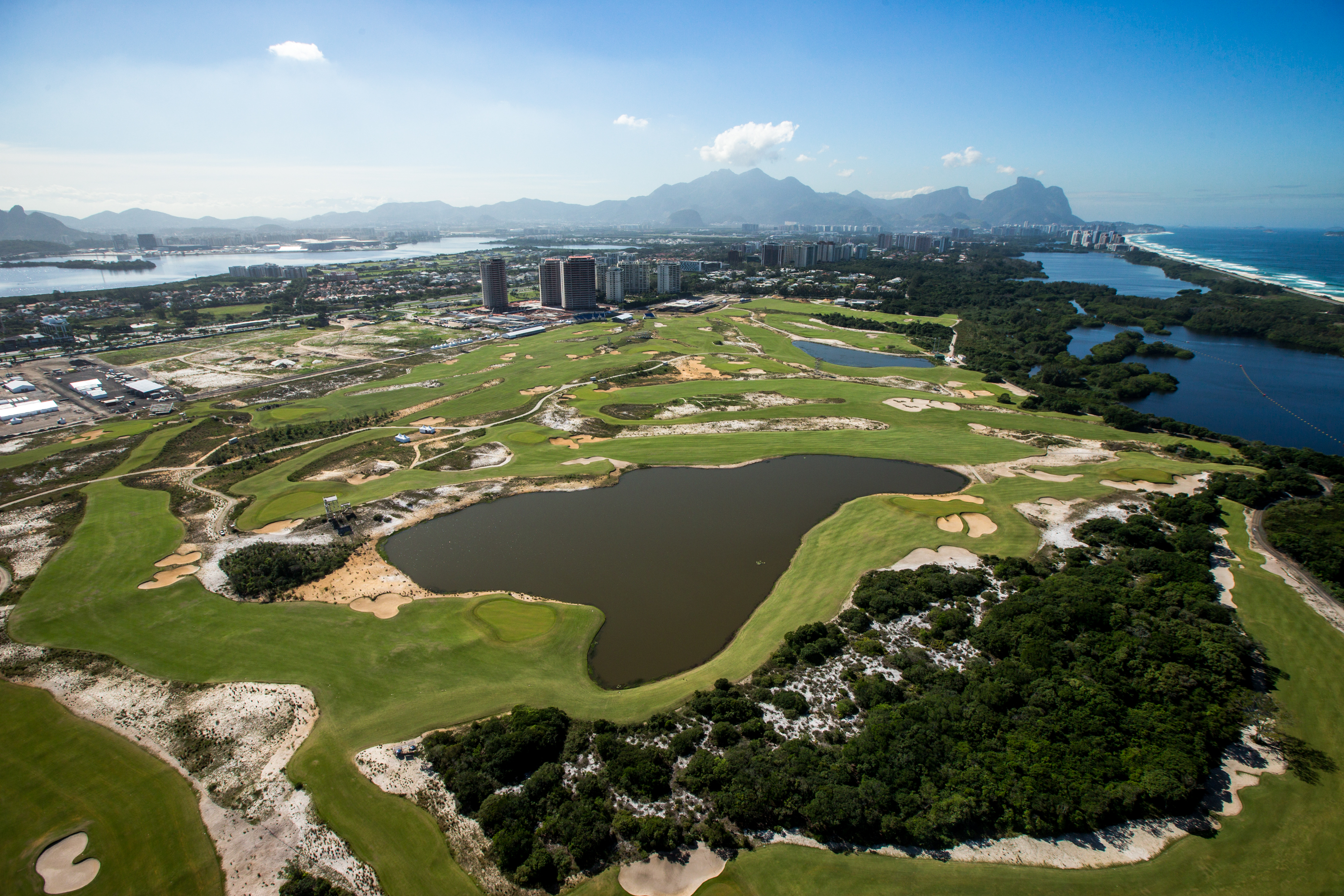
- The golf course as of December 2015
- Interactive map of Olympic Golf Course (Rio de Janeiro)
- 23.005°S 43.403°W

Club information
- Location: Reserva de Marapendi, Barra da Tijuca, Rio de Janeiro, Brazil
- Established: 2016
- Type: Public (Post-Olympics)
- Owner: City of Rio de Janeiro
- Operator: Rio de Janeiro Olympics Organizing Committee
- Tota holes: 18
- Tournaments: 2016 Summer Olympic Golf Tournaments
- Website: Rio 2016 Olympic venues
- Designed by: Gil Hanse
- Par: 71
- Length: Men: 6,525 m (7,128 yd); Women: 5,711 m (6,245 yd)
- Course record: Men: 61 Jonathan De Los Reyes, (2024 ECP Brazil Open); Women: 62 Maria Verchenova (2016)

The Rio de Janeiro Olympic Golf Course (Portuguese: Campo Olímpico de Golfe) is a golf course built for the golf tournaments of the 2016 Summer Olympics, within the Marapendi Natural Reserve in the Barra da Tijuca zone of Rio de Janeiro, Brazil.

The golf course was designed by Gil Hanse and the clubhouse chosen by competition, won by Pedro Évora and Pedro Rivera, from the Brazilian office Rua Arquitetos.

Map of the course

Golf returned to the Olympics in 2016 after more than a century, last played in 1904, and featured two events, the men's and women's individual events.

After the Summer Olympics ended, the golf course was opened to the public. The golf course has become a host to junior golf tournaments and introductory days to novice golfers.

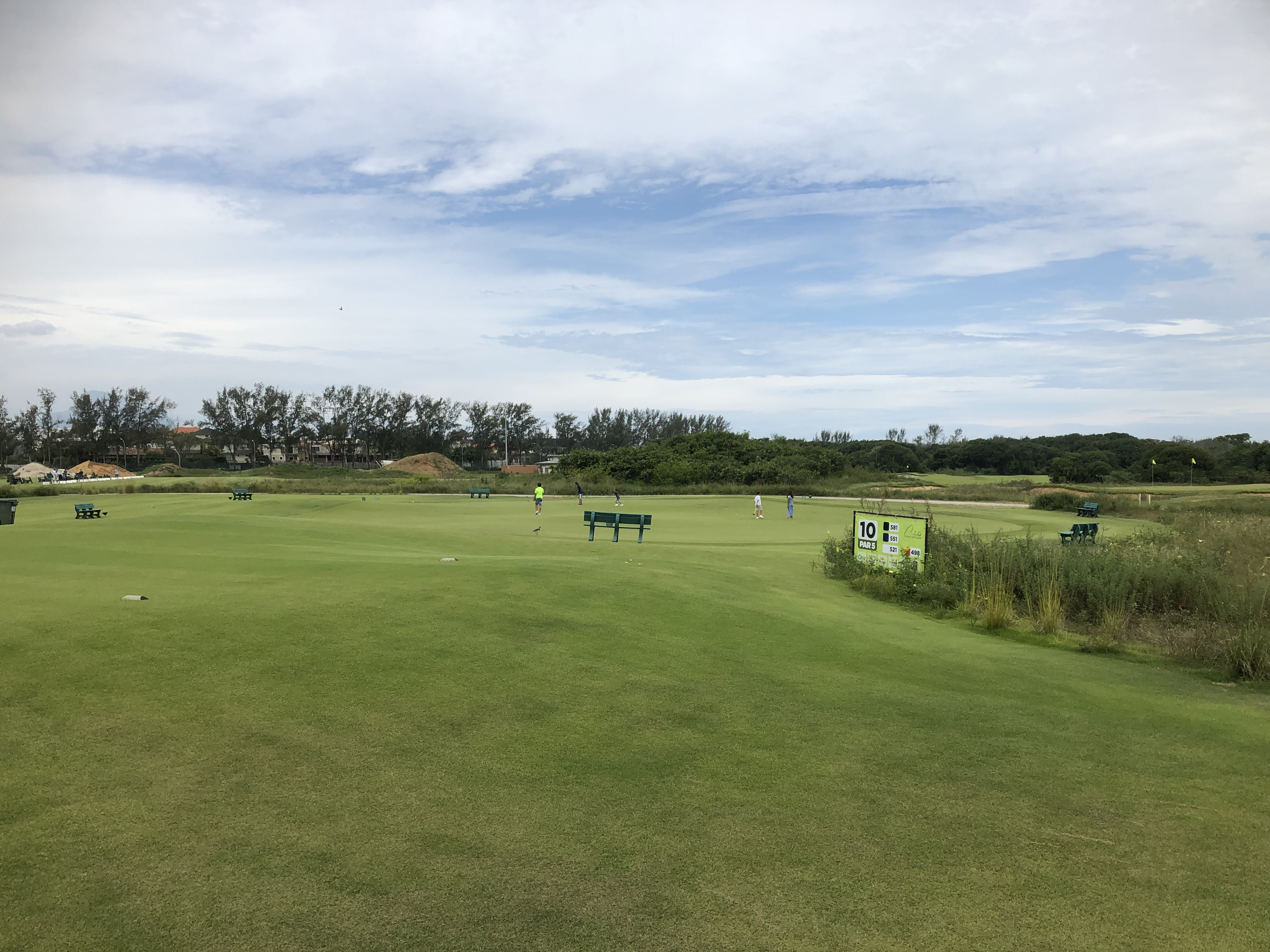
Junior golf introduction day, February 2016

== Scorecard (metres) ==
Olympic Golf Course
Tee	Rating/Slope	1	2	3	4	5	6	7	8	9	Out	10	11	12	13	14	15	16	17	18	In	Total
Par		5	4	4	3	5	3	4	3	4	35	5	4	4	4	3	4	4	3	5	36	71
Men (m)		552	444	321	175	500	179	451	157	337	3116	539	446	470	438	209	377	277	122	522	3400	6516
Women (m)		490	398	294	142	451	162	374	141	296	2748	481	384	393	373	174	342	241	110	465	2963	5711

== Scorecard (yards) ==
Olympic Golf Course
Tee	Rating/Slope	1	2	3	4	5	6	7	8	9	Out	10	11	12	13	14	15	16	17	18	In	Total
Par		5	4	4	3	5	3	4	3	4	35	5	4	4	4	3	4	4	3	5	36	71
Men (yd)		604	486	351	191	547	196	493	172	369	3409	590	488	514	479	229	412	303	133	571	3719	7128
Women (yd)		536	435	321	155	493	177	409	154	324	3004	526	420	430	408	190	374	264	120	509	3241	6245

Any discrepancy between metre and yard distances is due to round off error when converting from SI units to USC units.
