= Sweden at the 2016 Summer Olympics =

- IOC code: SWE
- NOC: Swedish Olympic Committee
- Website: www.sok.se (in Swedish and English)

in Rio de Janeiro
- Competitors: 152 in 22 sports
- Flag bearers: Therese Alshammar (opening); Emma Johansson (closing)
- Medals Ranked 29th: Gold 2 Silver 6 Bronze 3 Total 11

Summer Olympics appearances (overview)
- 1896; 1900; 1904; 1908; 1912; 1920; 1924; 1928; 1932; 1936; 1948; 1952; 1956; 1960; 1964; 1968; 1972; 1976; 1980; 1984; 1988; 1992; 1996; 2000; 2004; 2008; 2012; 2016; 2020; 2024; 2028

Other related appearances
- 1906 Intercalated Games

Sweden competed at the 2016 Summer Olympics in Rio de Janeiro, Brazil, from 3 to 20 August 2016. Swedish athletes have competed at every Summer Olympic Games in the modern era, except for the 1904 Summer Olympics in St. Louis. They extended their medal-winning streak to 47 straight Olympic Games by obtaining a silver in women's road race.

== Medalists ==
The following Swedish competitors won medals at the games. In the by discipline sections below, medalists' names are bolded.

Medal	Name	Sport	Event	Date
Gold	Sarah Sjöström	Swimming	Women's 100 m butterfly	7 August
Gold	Jenny Rissveds	Cycling	Women's cross-country race	20 August
Silver	Emma Johansson	Cycling	Women's road race	7 August
Silver	Sarah Sjöström	Swimming	Women's 200 m freestyle	9 August
Silver	Marcus Svensson	Shooting	Men's skeet	13 August
Silver	Henrik Stenson	Golf	Men's individual	14 August
Silver	Peder Fredricson	Equestrian	Individual jumping	19 August
Silver	Sweden women's national football team: Jonna Andersson; Emilia Appelqvist; Kosovare Asllani; Emma Berglund; Stina Blackstenius; Hilda Carlén; Lisa Dahlkvist; Magdalena Ericsson; Nilla Fischer; Pauline Hammarlund; Sofia Jakobsson; Hedvig Lindahl; Fridolina Rolfö; Elin Rubensson; Jessica Samuelsson; Lotta Schelin; Caroline Seger; Linda Sembrant; Olivia Schough	Football	Women's tournament	19 August
Bronze	Sarah Sjöström	Swimming	Women's 100 m freestyle	11 August
Bronze	Jenny Fransson	Wrestling	Women's 69 kg	17 August
Bronze	Sofia Mattsson	Wrestling	Women's 53 kg	18 August

Medals by sport
**Sport**	1st place, gold medalist(s)	2nd place, silver medalist(s)	3rd place, bronze medalist(s)	**Total**
Swimming	1	1	1	3
Cycling	1	1	0	2
Equestrian	0	1	0	1
Football	0	1	0	1
Golf	0	1	0	1
Shooting	0	1	0	1
Wrestling	0	0	2	2
Total	2	6	3	11

Medals by day
**Day**	1st place, gold medalist(s)	2nd place, silver medalist(s)	3rd place, bronze medalist(s)	**Total**
6 August	0	0	0	0
7 August	1	1	0	2
8 August	0	0	0	0
9 August	0	1	0	1
10 August	0	0	0	0
11 August	0	0	1	1
12 August	0	0	0	0
13 August	0	1	0	1
14 August	0	1	0	1
15 August	0	0	0	0
16 August	0	0	0	0
17 August	0	0	1	1
18 August	0	0	1	1
19 August	0	2	0	2
20 August	1	0	0	1
21 August	0	0	0	0
Total	2	6	3	11

Medals by gender
**Gender**	1st place, gold medalist(s)	2nd place, silver medalist(s)	3rd place, bronze medalist(s)	**Total**
Male	0	3	0	3
Female	2	3	3	8
Total	2	6	3	11

Multiple medalists
**Name**	**Sport**	1st place, gold medalist(s)	2nd place, silver medalist(s)	3rd place, bronze medalist(s)	**Total**
Sarah Sjöström	Swimming	1	1	1	3

== Competitors ==
The following is the list of number of competitors participating in the Games. Note that reserves in equestrian, football, handball and table tennis are not counted as athletes:

Sport	Men	Women	Total
Archery	0	1	1
Athletics	5	10	15
Badminton	1	0	1
Boxing	0	1	1
Canoeing	2	3	5
Cycling	0	4	4
Equestrian	5	7	12
Football	18	19	37
Golf	2	2	4
Gymnastics	0	1	1
Handball	14	14	28
Judo	3	1	4
Rowing	0	1	1
Sailing	4	3	7
Shooting	3	0	3
Swimming	2	9	11
Table tennis	3	2	5
Taekwondo	0	2	2
Tennis	0	1	1
Triathlon	0	1	1
Weightlifting	0	1	1
Wrestling	3	4	7
Total	65	87	152

== Archery ==
One Swedish archer has qualified for the women's individual recurve at the Olympics by virtue of a top six national finish at the 2016 Archery World Cup meet in Antalya, Turkey.

Athlete	Event	Ranking round		Round of 64	Round of 32	Round of 16	Quarterfinals	Semifinals	Final / BM	
Athlete	Event	Score	Seed	Opposition Score	Opposition Score	Opposition Score	Opposition Score	Opposition Score	Opposition Score	Rank
Christine Bjerendal	Women's individual	611	47	Rendón (COL); W 6–2	Kang U-j (PRK); L 2–6	Did not advance				

== Athletics ==
Sixteen Swedish athletes have been selected to compete in the games. The SOK selected its athletes with a specific qualifying standard based on the results at the 2012 Summer Olympics, 2013 IAAF World Championships and the 2015 IAAF World Championships to ensure that the athlete can reach a top eight position. However, Melker Svärd Jacobsson who was scheduled to compete in men's pole vault had to withdraw before the games due to injury.

Key

- Note–Ranks given for track events are within the athlete's heat only
- Q = Qualified for the next round
- q = Qualified for the next round as a fastest loser or, in field events, by position without achieving the qualifying target
- NR = National record
- N/A = Round not applicable for the event
- Bye = Athlete not required to compete in round

Track & road events

Athlete	Event	Heat		Semifinal		Final	
Athlete	Event	Result	Rank	Result	Rank	Result	Rank
Perseus Karlström	Men's 20 km walk	—N/a				DNF	
Meraf Bahta	Women's 1500 m	4:06.82	5 Q	4:06.41	5 Q	4:12.59	6
Charlotta Fougberg	Women's 3000 m steeplechase	9:31.16	8	—N/a		Did not advance	
Susanna Kallur	Women's 100 m hurdles	13.04	5	Did not advance			
Sarah Lahti	Women's 10000 m	—N/a				31:28.43 NR	12
Lovisa Lindh	Women's 800 m	2:00.04	2 Q	1:59.41	4	Did not advance	

Field events
Men

Athlete	Event	Qualification		Final	
Athlete	Event	Distance	Position	Distance	Position
Kim Amb	Javelin throw	80.49	17	Did not advance	
Axel Härstedt	Discus throw	63.58	7 q	62.12	10
Daniel Ståhl	Discus throw	62.26	14	Did not advance	
Michel Tornéus	Long jump	7.65	26	Did not advance	

Women

Athlete	Event	Qualification		Final	
Athlete	Event	Distance	Position	Distance	Position
Angelica Bengtsson	Pole vault	4.55	14	Did not advance	
Erika Kinsey	High jump	1.85	29	Did not advance	
Michaela Meijer	Pole vault	4.45	17	Did not advance	
Khaddi Sagnia	Long jump	6.25	27	Did not advance	
Sofie Skoog	High jump	1.94	7 Q	1.93	=7

== Badminton ==
Sweden has qualified one badminton player for the men's singles into the Olympic tournament. London 2012 Olympian Henri Hurskainen had claimed his Olympic spot as one of top 34 individual shuttlers in the BWF World Rankings as of 5 May 2016.

Athlete	Event	Group Stage			Round of 16	Quarterfinal	Semifinal	Final / BM	
Athlete	Event	Opposition Score	Opposition Score	Rank	Opposition Score	Opposition Score	Opposition Score	Opposition Score	Rank
Henri Hurskainen	Men's singles	Muñoz (MEX); W (21–12, 21–11)	Kidambi (IND); L (6–21, 18–21)	2	Did not advance				

== Boxing ==
Sweden has qualified one boxer to compete in the women's middleweight division into the Olympic boxing tournament. 2012 Olympian Anna Laurell Nash had claimed her Olympic spot with a semifinal victory at the 2016 European Qualification Tournament in Samsun, Turkey.

Athlete	Event	Round of 16	Quarterfinals	Semifinals	Final	
Athlete	Event	Opposition Result	Opposition Result	Opposition Result	Opposition Result	Rank
Anna Laurell Nash	Women's middleweight	Marshall (GBR); L 0–3	Did not advance			

== Canoeing ==
=== Slalom ===
Sweden has received a spare Olympic berth freed up by the Netherlands to send a canoeist competing in the men's K-1 class, as the next highest-ranked eligible individual, not yet qualified, at the 2016 European Canoe Slalom Championships in Liptovský Mikuláš, Slovakia, signifying the nation's debut in slalom canoeing.

Athlete	Event	Preliminary						Semifinal		Final	
Athlete	Event	Run 1	Rank	Run 2	Rank	Best	Rank	Time	Rank	Time	Rank
Isak Öhrström	Men's K-1	92.37	10	91.43	11	91.43	13 Q	156.77	15	Did not advance	

=== Sprint ===
Sweden has qualified a single boat in men's K-1 200 m for the Games through the 2015 ICF Canoe Sprint World Championships. Meanwhile, two additional boats (women's K-1 200 m and women's K-2 500 m) were awarded to the Swedish squad by virtue of a top two national finish at the 2016 European Qualification Regatta in Duisburg, Germany.

On 25 July 2016, one additional boat was awarded to the Swedish squad in the men's K-2 200 m and one in women's K-1 500 m, as a response to the removal of five boats held by the Russians from the International Canoe Federation due to their previous doping bans and their implications in the "disappearing positive methodology" set out in the McClaren Report on Russia's state-sponsored doping. SOK decided to decline the spot in the men's K-2 200 m, but selected Karin Johansson for women's K-1 500 m.

Athlete	Event	Heats		Semifinals		Final	
Athlete	Event	Time	Rank	Time	Rank	Time	Rank
Petter Menning	Men's K-1 200 m	35.264	5 Q	34.995	6 FB	37.104	10
Linnea Stensils	Women's K-1 200 m	40.828	2 Q	41.245	2 FA	41.293	7
Karin Johansson	Women's K-1 500 m	1:55.049	4 Q	1:59.321	4 FB	1:58.363	14
Karin Johansson; Sofia Paldanius	Women's K-2 500 m	1:46.456	7 Q	1:44.090	4 FB	1:47.207	9

Qualification Legend: FA = Qualify to final (medal); FB = Qualify to final B (non-medal)

== Cycling ==
=== Road ===
Swedish riders qualified for the following three quota places in women's Olympic road race by virtue of their top 13 national finish in the 2016 UCI World Ranking (for women).

Athlete	Event	Time	Rank
Emilia Fahlin	Women's road race	3:58:03	27
Emma Johansson	Women's road race	3:51:27	2nd place, silver medalist(s)
Sara Mustonen	Women's road race	Did not finish	

=== Mountain biking ===
Swedish mountain bikers qualified for one men's and women's quota place each into the Olympic cross-country race, as a result of the nation's nineteenth-place finish for men and sixteenth for women, respectively, in the UCI Olympic Ranking List of 25 May 2016. With Olympic selection criteria requiring riders to show top eight potential, the SOK had decided to nominate one mountain biker to the Olympic roster instead, which was awarded to Jenny Rissveds in women's cross-country.

Athlete	Event	Time	Rank
Jenny Rissveds	Women's cross-country	1:30:16	1st place, gold medalist(s)

== Equestrian ==
Swedish equestrians have qualified a full squad in all three disciplines through the 2014 FEI World Equestrian Games, the 2015 European Dressage Championships and the 2015 European Eventing Championships. Mads Hendeliowitz (dressage), Linda Algotsson (eventing) and Charlotte Mordasini (jumping) were named as reserves. Reserve Linda Algotsson and her horse Fairnet stepped in to compete when Anna Nilsson's horse Luron got an airway infection.

=== Dressage ===
Swedish dressage team was named on 1 July 2016. Therese Nilshagen was originally selected for the team but her horse Dante Weltino was ill so she was replaced by Mads Hendeliowitz.

Athlete	Horse	Event	Grand Prix		Grand Prix Special		Grand Prix Freestyle		Overall	
Athlete	Horse	Event	Score	Rank	Score	Rank	Technical	Artistic	Score	Rank
Mads Hendeliowitz	Jimmie Choo SEQ	Individual	71.771 #	29 Q	71.681 #	29	Did not advance			
Patrik Kittel	Deja	Individual	74.586	22 Q	73.866	18 Q	78.286	73.750	76.018	16
Juliette Ramel	Buriel	Individual	74.943	19 Q	72.045	28	Did not advance			
Tinne Vilhelmson-Silfvén	Don Auriello	Individual	76.414	11 Q	77.199	7 Q	78.393	84.714	81.535	8
Mads Hendeliowitz; Patrik Kittel; Juliette Ramel; Tinne Vilhelmson-Silfvén	See above	Team	75.319	5 Q	74.370	5	—N/a		74.845	5

"#" indicates that the score of this rider does not count in the team competition, since only the best three results of a team are counted.

=== Eventing ===
Athlete	Horse	Event	Dressage		Cross-country			Jumping						Total	
Athlete	Horse	Event	Dressage		Cross-country			Qualifier			Final			Total	
Athlete	Horse	Event	Penalties	Rank	Penalties	Total	Rank	Penalties	Total	Rank	Penalties	Total	Rank	Penalties	Rank
Linda Algotsson	Fairnet	Individual	50.90	47	109.60 #	160.50 #	48	4.00	164.50	45	Did not advance			164.50	45
Sara Algotsson Ostholt	Reality	Individual	45.30	19	61.20	106.60	37	6.00	112.60	36	Did not advance			112.60	36
Frida Andersén	Herta	Individual	47.90	36	9.20	57.10	12	Withdrew			Did not advance				
Ludwig Svennerstål	Aspe	Individual	51.00 #	48	28.40	79.40	26	8.00	87.40	27	Did not advance			87.40	27
Linda Algotsson; Sara Algotsson Ostholt; Frida Andersén; Ludwig Svennerstål	See above	Team	144.20	10	98.90	243.10	7	121.40	364.50	11	—N/a			364.50	11

"#" indicates that the score of this rider does not count in the team competition, since only the best three results of a team are counted.

=== Jumping ===
Athlete	Horse	Event	Qualification								Final					Total	
Athlete	Horse	Event	Round 1		Round 2			Round 3			Round A		Round B			Total	
Athlete	Horse	Event	Penalties	Rank	Penalties	Total	Rank	Penalties	Total	Rank	Penalties	Rank	Penalties	Total	Rank	Penalties	Rank
Malin Baryard-Johnsson	Cue Channa	Individual	8	53 Q	4	12	46 ^{TO}	17 #	TO		Did not advance						
Rolf-Göran Bengtsson	Unita	Individual	16 #	64 ^{TO}	4 #	TO		1	TO		Did not advance						
Peder Fredricson	All In	Individual	0	1 Q	0	0	1 Q	1	1	2 Q	0	1 Q	0	0	2nd place, silver medalist(s)	0	2nd place, silver medalist(s)
Henrik von Eckermann	Yajamila	Individual	0	1 Q	4	4	15 Q	8	12	31 Q	4	16 Q	12	16	24	16	24
Malin Baryard-Johnsson; Rolf-Göran Bengtsson; Peder Fredricson; Henrik von Eckermann	See above	Team	8	=8	8	—N/a	7 Q	10	18	=7	—N/a					18	=7

"TO" indicates that the rider only qualified for the team competition. "#" indicates that the score of this rider does not count in the team competition, since only the best three results of a team are counted.

== Football ==
Summary

Key:

- A.E.T – After extra time.
- P – Match decided by penalty-shootout.

Team	Event	Group Stage				Quarterfinal	Semifinal	Final / BM	
Team	Event	Opposition Score	Opposition Score	Opposition Score	Rank	Opposition Score	Opposition Score	Opposition Score	Rank
Sweden men's	Men's tournament	Colombia; D 2–2	Nigeria; L 0–1	Japan; L 0–1	4	Did not advance			15
Sweden women's	Women's tournament	South Africa; W 1–0	Brazil; L 1–5	China; D 0–0	3	United States; W 4–3^{P} 1–1 (a.e.t.)	Brazil; W 4–3^{P} 0–0 (a.e.t.)	Germany; L 1–2	2nd place, silver medalist(s)

=== Men's tournament ===
Sweden's men's football team qualified for the Olympics by virtue of a top four finish and progressing to the semifinal match of the 2015 UEFA European Under-21 Championship in the Czech Republic.

Team roster

The following is the Swedish squad in the men's football tournament of the 2016 Summer Olympics. The team of 18 players was officially named on 15 July. On 23 July, Jordan Larsson left the squad due to refusal of his club to release for the Games.

Head coach: Håkan Ericson

No.	Pos.	Player	Date of birth (age)	Caps	Goals	Club
1	GK	Andreas Linde	24 July 1993 (aged 23)	1	0	(Norwegian Football Federation) Molde FK
2	DF	Adam Lundkvist	20 March 1994 (aged 22)	1	0	(Swedish Football Association) IF Elfsborg
3	DF	Alexander Milošević*	30 January 1992 (aged 24)	1	0	(German Football Association) Hannover 96
4	DF	Joakim Nilsson	6 February 1994 (aged 22)	1	0	(Swedish Football Association) IF Elfsborg
5	DF	Pa Konate	25 April 1994 (aged 22)	1	0	(Swedish Football Association) Malmö FF
6	MF	Abdul Khalili*	7 June 1992 (aged 24)	1	0	(Turkish Football Federation) Mersin İdman Yurdu
7	MF	Simon Tibbling	7 September 1994 (aged 21)	1	0	(Royal Dutch Football Association) Groningen
8	MF	Alexander Fransson	2 April 1994 (aged 22)	0	0	(Swiss Football Association) Basel
9	MF	Robin Quaison	9 October 1993 (aged 22)	1	0	(Italian Football Federation) Palermo
10	MF	Muamer Tanković	22 February 1995 (aged 21)	1	0	(Royal Dutch Football Association) AZ
11	MF	Astrit Ajdarević* (captain)	17 April 1990 (aged 26)	1	0	(Swedish Football Association) Örebro SK
12	FW	Mikael Ishak	31 March 1993 (aged 23)	0	0	(Danish Football Association) Randers FC
13	DF	Jacob Une Larsson	8 April 1994 (aged 22)	1	1	(Swedish Football Association) Djurgårdens IF
14	DF	Sebastian Starke Hedlund	5 April 1995 (aged 21)	1	0	(Swedish Football Association) Kalmar FF
15	DF	Noah Sonko Sundberg	6 June 1996 (aged 20)	0	0	(Swedish Football Association) GIF Sundsvall
17	MF	Ken Sema	30 September 1993 (aged 22)	1	1	(Swedish Football Association) Östersunds FK
18	GK	Tim Erlandsson	25 December 1996 (aged 19)	0	0	(The Football Association) Nottingham Forest
21	FW	Valmir Berisha	6 June 1996 (aged 20)	0	0	Unattached

* Over-aged player.

Group play

Pos	Team	Pld	W	D	L	GF	GA	GD	Pts	Qualification
1	Nigeria	3	2	0	1	6	6	0	6	Quarter-finals
2	Colombia	3	1	2	0	6	4	+2	5	Quarter-finals
3	Japan	3	1	1	1	7	7	0	4	
4	Sweden	3	0	1	2	2	4	−2	1	

Source: Rio2016 & FIFA
Rules for classification: Tiebreakers
4 August 2016
19:00 (18:00 UTC–4)

Sweden	2–2	Colombia
Ishak 43'; Ajdarević 62'	Report (Rio2016); Report (FIFA)	Gutiérrez 17'; Pabón 75' (pen.)

Arena da Amazônia, Manaus
Attendance: 29,996
Referee: Fahad Al-Mirdasi (Saudi Arabia)

7 August 2016
19:00 (18:00 UTC–4)

Sweden	0–1	Nigeria
	Report (Rio2016); Report (FIFA)	Sadiq 40'

Arena da Amazônia, Manaus
Attendance: 23,892
Referee: Matthew Conger (New Zealand)

10 August 2016
19:00

Japan	1–0	Sweden
Yajima 65'	Report (Rio2016); Report (FIFA)

Itaipava Arena Fonte Nova, Salvador
Attendance: 17,821
Referee: Malang Diedhiou (Senegal)

=== Women's tournament ===
The Swedish women's football team qualified for the Olympics by winning the gold medal and securing a lone outright berth at the UEFA Olympic Qualifying Tournament in the Netherlands.

Team roster

Head coach: Pia Sundhage

Sweden named a squad of 18 players and 4 alternates for the tournament, which was announced on 28 June 2016. During the tournament, Pauline Hammarlund replaced Fridolina Rolfö on 14 August 2016 due to injury.

No.	Pos.	Player	Date of birth (age)	Caps	Goals	Club
1	GK	Hedvig Lindahl	29 April 1983 (aged 33)	122	0	(The Football Association) Chelsea
2	DF	Jonna Andersson	2 January 1993 (aged 23)	4	0	(Swedish Football Association) Linköpings FC
3	DF	Linda Sembrant	15 May 1987 (aged 29)	69	7	(French Football Federation) Montpellier HSC
4	DF	Emma Berglund	19 December 1988 (aged 27)	44	1	(Swedish Football Association) FC Rosengård
5	DF	Nilla Fischer	2 August 1984 (aged 32)	144	20	(German Football Association) VfL Wolfsburg
6	DF	Magdalena Eriksson	8 September 1993 (aged 22)	11	1	(Swedish Football Association) Linköpings FC
7	MF	Lisa Dahlkvist	6 February 1987 (aged 29)	110	11	(Swedish Football Association) KIF Örebro
8	FW	Lotta Schelin (co-captain)	27 February 1984 (aged 32)	165	84	(Swedish Football Association) FC Rosengård
9	MF	Kosovare Asllani	29 July 1989 (aged 27)	83	25	(The Football Association) Manchester City
10	FW	Sofia Jakobsson	23 April 1990 (aged 26)	71	12	(French Football Federation) Montpellier HSC
11	FW	Stina Blackstenius	5 February 1996 (aged 20)	8	1	(Swedish Football Association) Linköpings FC
12	FW	Olivia Schough	11 March 1991 (aged 25)	36	5	(Swedish Football Association) Eskilstuna United
13	FW	Fridolina Rolfö	24 November 1993 (aged 22)	9	4	(Swedish Football Association) Linköpings FC
14	MF	Emilia Appelqvist	11 February 1990 (aged 26)	12	1	(Swedish Football Association) Djurgårdens IF
15	DF	Jessica Samuelsson	30 January 1992 (aged 24)	32	0	(Swedish Football Association) Linköpings FC
16	MF	Elin Rubensson	11 May 1993 (aged 23)	31	0	(Swedish Football Association) Kopparbergs/Göteborg FC
17	MF	Caroline Seger (co-captain)	19 March 1985 (aged 31)	151	23	(French Football Federation) Olympique Lyon
18	GK	Hilda Carlén	13 August 1991 (aged 24)	2	0	(Swedish Football Association) Piteå IF
19	FW	Pauline Hammarlund	7 May 1994 (aged 22)	6	3	(Swedish Football Association) Kopparbergs/Göteborg FC

Group stage

Pos	Team	Pld	W	D	L	GF	GA	GD	Pts	Qualification
1	Brazil (H)	3	2	1	0	8	1	+7	7	Quarter-finals
2	China	3	1	1	1	2	3	−1	4	Quarter-finals
3	Sweden	3	1	1	1	2	5	−3	4	Quarter-finals
4	South Africa	3	0	1	2	0	3	−3	1	

Source: Rio2016 & FIFA
Rules for classification: Tiebreakers
(H) Hosts
3 August 2016
13:00

Sweden	1–0	South Africa
Fischer 76'	Report (Rio2016); Report (FIFA); Report

Estádio Olímpico João Havelange, Rio de Janeiro
Attendance: 13,439
Referee: Teodora Albon (Romania)

6 August 2016
22:00

Brazil	5–1	Sweden
Beatriz 21', 86'; Cristiane 24'; Marta 44' (pen.), 80'	Report (Rio2016); Report (FIFA); Report	Schelin 89'

Estádio Olímpico João Havelange, Rio de Janeiro
Attendance: 43,384
Referee: Lucila Venegas (Mexico)

9 August 2016
22:00

China	0–0	Sweden
	Report (Rio2016); Report (FIFA); Report

Estádio Nacional Mané Garrincha, Brasília
Attendance: 7,648
Referee: Olga Miranda (Paraguay)

Quarterfinal

12 August 2016
13:00

United States	1–1 (a.e.t.)	Sweden
Morgan 77'	Report (Rio2016); Report (FIFA); Report	Blackstenius 61'
Penalties
Morgan (penalty missed); Horan (penalty scored); Lloyd (penalty scored); Brian (penalty scored); Press (penalty missed)	3–4	(penalty scored) Schelin; (penalty scored) Asllani; (penalty missed) Sembrant; (penalty scored) Seger; (penalty scored) Dahlkvist

Estádio Nacional Mané Garrincha, Brasília
Attendance: 13,892
Referee: Anna-Marie Keighley (New Zealand)

Semifinal

16 August 2016
13:00

Brazil	0–0 (a.e.t.)	Sweden
	Report (Rio2016); Report (FIFA); Report
Penalties
Marta (penalty scored); Cristiane (penalty missed); Andressa Alves (penalty scored); Rafaelle (penalty scored); Andressinha (penalty missed)	3–4	(penalty scored) Schelin; (penalty missed) Asllani; (penalty scored) Seger; (penalty scored) Fischer; (penalty scored) Dahlkvist

Maracanã Stadium, Rio de Janeiro
Attendance: 70,454
Referee: Lucila Venegas (Mexico)

Gold medal match

19 August 2016
17:30

Sweden	1–2	Germany
Blackstenius 67'	Report (Rio2016); Report (FIFA); Report	Marozsán 48'; Sembrant 62' (o.g.)

Maracanã Stadium, Rio de Janeiro
Attendance: 52,432
Referee: Carol Chenard (Canada)

== Golf ==
Sweden has entered four golfers (two per gender) into the Olympic tournament. David Lingmerth (world no. 48), Henrik Stenson (world no. 6), Pernilla Lindberg (world no. 90) and Anna Nordqvist (world no. 11) qualified directly among the top 60 eligible players for their respective individual events based on the IGF World Rankings as of 11 July 2016.

Athlete	Event	Round 1	Round 2	Round 3	Round 4	Total		
Athlete	Event	Score	Score	Score	Score	Score	Par	Rank
David Lingmerth	Men's	69	70	68	71	278	−6	=11
Henrik Stenson	Men's	66	68	68	68	270	−14	2nd place, silver medalist(s)
Pernilla Lindberg	Women's	74	73	69	70	286	+2	=31
Anna Nordqvist	Women's	71	70	68	69	278	−6	=11

== Gymnastics ==
=== Artistic ===
Sweden has entered one artistic gymnast into the Olympic competition. Emma Larsson had claimed her Olympic spot in the women's apparatus and all-around events at the Olympic Test Event in Rio de Janeiro.

Women

Athlete	Event	Qualification						Final					
Athlete	Event	Apparatus				Total	Rank	Apparatus				Total	Rank
Athlete	Event	V	UB	BB	F	Total	Rank	V	UB	BB	F	Total	Rank
Emma Larsson	All-around	14.066	12.766	14.000	13.500	54.332	35	Did not advance					

Larsson was ranked 65th in the uneven bars event, 27th in the balance beam event and 42nd in the floor event.

== Handball ==
Summary

Key:

- ET: After extra time
- P – Match decided by penalty-shootout.

Team	Event	Group Stage						Quarterfinal	Semifinal	Final / BM	
Team	Event	Opposition Score	Opposition Score	Opposition Score	Opposition Score	Opposition Score	Rank	Opposition Score	Opposition Score	Opposition Score	Rank
Sweden men's	Men's tournament	Germany; L 29–32	Egypt; L 25–26	Slovenia; L 24–29	Poland; L 24–25	Brazil; W 30–19	6	Did not advance			11
Sweden women's	Women's tournament	Argentina; W 31–21	South Korea; W 31–28	Russia; L 34–36	Netherlands; D 29–29	France; L 25–27	3	Norway; L 20–33	Did not advance		7

=== Men's tournament ===
The Swedish men's handball team qualified for the Olympics by virtue of a top two finish at the second meet of the Olympic Qualification Tournament in Malmö.

Team roster

The final squad of 14 players were presented on 6 July 2016. The following is the Swedish roster in the men's handball tournament of the 2016 Summer Olympics. Albin Lagergren replaced Johan Jakobsson on 15 August 2016.

Head coaches: Ola Lindgren and Staffan Olsson

No.	Pos.	Name	Date of birth (age)	Height	App.	Goals	Club
1	GK	Mattias Andersson	29 March 1978 (aged 38)	1.85 m	141	0	(Germany) Flensburg-Handewitt
3	RB	Kim Andersson	21 August 1982 (aged 33)	1.99 m	222	787	(Sweden) Ystads IF
5	CB	Jim Gottfridsson	2 September 1992 (aged 23)	1.90 m	25	84	(Germany) Flensburg-Handewitt
9	LW	Jerry Tollbring	13 September 1995 (aged 20)	1.82 m	3	2	(Sweden) IFK Kristianstad
11	LB	Lukas Nilsson	16 November 1996 (aged 19)	1.92 m	18	53	(Germany) THW Kiel
13	LB	Jonathan Stenbäcken	7 January 1988 (aged 28)	1.95 m	40	49	(Germany) TBV Lemgo
18	RB	Johan Jakobsson	12 February 1987 (aged 29)	1.95 m	105	220	(Germany) Flensburg-Handewitt
19	P	Tobias Karlsson	4 June 1981 (aged 35)	1.96 m	143	79	(Germany) Flensburg-Handewitt
20	GK	Mikael Appelgren	6 September 1989 (aged 26)	1.91 m	37	0	(Germany) Rhein-Neckar Löwen
23	RB	Albin Lagergren	11 September 1992 (aged 23)	1.86 m	2	4	(Sweden) IFK Kristianstad
24	LW	Fredrik Petersen	27 August 1983 (aged 32)	1.88 m	150	416	(Sweden) Malmö
28	LB	Philip Stenmalm	3 April 1992 (aged 24)	1.98 m	23	31	(Denmark) KIF Kolding København
32	RW	Mattias Zachrisson	22 August 1990 (aged 25)	1.79 m	76	128	(Germany) Füchse Berlin
35	P	Andreas Nilsson	12 April 1990 (aged 26)	1.97 m	96	224	(Hungary) Telekom Veszprém
36	P	Jesper Nielsen	30 August 1989 (aged 26)	2.00 m	66	80	(Germany) Füchse Berlin

Group stage

Pos	Team	Pld	W	D	L	GF	GA	GD	Pts	Qualification
1	Germany	5	4	0	1	153	141	+12	8 (Note: Slovenia 25–28 Germany)	Quarter-finals
2	Slovenia	5	4	0	1	137	126	+11	8	Quarter-finals
3	Brazil (H)	5	2	1	2	141	150	−9	5	Quarter-finals
4	Poland	5	2	0	3	139	140	−1	4	Quarter-finals
5	Egypt	5	1	1	3	129	143	−14	3	
6	Sweden	5	1	0	4	132	131	+1	2	

Source: IHF
Rules for classification: 1) Points; 2) Head-to-head points; 3) Head-to-head goal difference; 4) Head-to-head goals scored; 5) Goal difference; 6) Goals scored; 7) Draw.
(H) Hosts
Notes:

7 August 2016; 11:30	Sweden	29–32	Germany	Future Arena, Rio de Janeiro; Referees: Hansen, Gjeding (DEN)
7 August 2016; 11:30	Tollbring 8	(15–18)	Kühn 7	Future Arena, Rio de Janeiro; Referees: Hansen, Gjeding (DEN)
7 August 2016; 11:30	4× (yellow card) 9× (suspension) 1× (red card)	Report	3× (yellow card) 9× (suspension)	Future Arena, Rio de Janeiro; Referees: Hansen, Gjeding (DEN)

9 August 2016; 19:50	Egypt	26–25	Sweden	Future Arena, Rio de Janeiro; Referees: Mousaviyan, Kolahdouzan (IRI)
9 August 2016; 19:50	Sanad 7	(12–13)	Petersen 5	Future Arena, Rio de Janeiro; Referees: Mousaviyan, Kolahdouzan (IRI)
9 August 2016; 19:50	4× (yellow card) 7× (suspension)	Report	3× (yellow card) 8× (suspension)	Future Arena, Rio de Janeiro; Referees: Mousaviyan, Kolahdouzan (IRI)

11 August 2016; 19:50	Slovenia	29–24	Sweden	Future Arena, Rio de Janeiro; Referees: Lopéz, Ramírez (ESP)
11 August 2016; 19:50	Janc, Razgor 5	(14–13)	Tollbring 6	Future Arena, Rio de Janeiro; Referees: Lopéz, Ramírez (ESP)
11 August 2016; 19:50	4× (yellow card) 7× (suspension)	Report	4× (yellow card) 6× (suspension)	Future Arena, Rio de Janeiro; Referees: Lopéz, Ramírez (ESP)

13 August 2016; 19:50	Sweden	24–25	Poland	Future Arena, Rio de Janeiro; Referees: Geipel, Helbig (GER)
13 August 2016; 19:50	Stenmalm 8	(13–12)	Bielecki 8	Future Arena, Rio de Janeiro; Referees: Geipel, Helbig (GER)
13 August 2016; 19:50	3× (yellow card) 2× (suspension)	Report	4× (yellow card) 8× (suspension)	Future Arena, Rio de Janeiro; Referees: Geipel, Helbig (GER)

15 August 2016; 16:40	Sweden	30–19	Brazil	Future Arena, Rio de Janeiro; Referees: Santos, Fonseca (POR)
15 August 2016; 16:40	Stenmalm 6	(16–10)	Toledo 4	Future Arena, Rio de Janeiro; Referees: Santos, Fonseca (POR)
15 August 2016; 16:40	4× (yellow card) 4× (suspension)	Report	2× (yellow card) 3× (suspension)	Future Arena, Rio de Janeiro; Referees: Santos, Fonseca (POR)

=== Women's tournament ===
Sweden's women's handball team qualified for the Olympics by virtue of a top two finish at the third meet of the Olympic Qualification Tournament in Astrakhan, Russia.

Team roster

The final squad of 14 players were presented on 5 July 2016. The following is the Swedish roster in the women's handball tournament of the 2016 Summer Olympics. On 16 August, Hanna Blomstrand replaced Michaela Ek due to an injury.

Head coach: Henrik Signell

No.	Pos.	Name	Date of birth (age)	Height	App.	Goals	Club
1	GK	Johanna Bundsen	3 June 1991 (aged 25)	1.85 m	35	0	(Sweden) IK Sävehof
3	P	Frida Tegstedt	17 July 1987 (aged 29)	1.80 m	40	37	(France) Issy-Paris Hand
6	LB	Carin Strömberg	10 July 1993 (aged 23)	1.83 m	17	16	(Denmark) Viborg HK
7	P	Linn Blohm	20 May 1992 (aged 24)	1.80 m	52	117	(Denmark) FC Midtjylland
8	LB	Jamina Roberts	28 May 1990 (aged 26)	1.75 m	102	174	(Denmark) Team Tvis Holstebro
9	LW	Louise Sand	27 December 1992 (aged 23)	1.64 m	59	120	(Sweden) IK Sävehof
10	RW	Michaela Ek	1 February 1988 (aged 28)	1.73 m	7	5	(Denmark) Ringkøbing
12	GK	Filippa Idéhn	15 August 1990 (aged 25)	1.83 m	58	2	(Denmark) Team Esbjerg
17	CB	Linnea Torstenson	30 March 1983 (aged 33)	1.80 m	169	637	(Romania) CSM București
20	CB	Isabelle Gulldén	29 June 1989 (aged 27)	1.79 m	154	568	(Romania) CSM București
22	RB	Hanna Blomstrand	25 August 1996 (aged 19)	1.70 m	3	1	(Sweden) Lugi HF
24	RW	Nathalie Hagman	19 July 1991 (aged 25)	1.67 m	89	212	(Denmark) Nykøbing Falster
25	RB	Angelica Wallén	11 April 1986 (aged 30)	1.78 m	72	93	(Sweden) Skuru IK
27	RB	Sabina Jacobsen	24 March 1989 (aged 27)	1.80 m	82	121	(Denmark) FC Midtjylland
29	LB	Jenny Alm	10 April 1989 (aged 27)	1.84 m	73	185	(Denmark) Team Esbjerg

Group play

Pos	Team	Pld	W	D	L	GF	GA	GD	Pts	Qualification
1	Russia	5	5	0	0	165	147	+18	10	Quarter-finals
2	France	5	4	0	1	118	93	+25	8	Quarter-finals
3	Sweden	5	2	1	2	150	141	+9	5	Quarter-finals
4	Netherlands	5	1	2	2	135	135	0	4	Quarter-finals
5	South Korea	5	1	1	3	130	136	−6	3	
6	Argentina	5	0	0	5	101	147	−46	0	

Source: IHF
Rules for classification: 1) Points; 2) Head-to-head points; 3) Head-to-head goal difference; 4) Head-to-head goals scored; 5) Goal difference; 6) Goals scored; 7) Draw.

6 August 2016; 21:50	Sweden	31–21	Argentina	Future Arena, Rio de Janeiro; Referees: Coulibaly, Diabaté (CIV)
6 August 2016; 21:50	Hagman 6	(13–9)	Mendoza 5	Future Arena, Rio de Janeiro; Referees: Coulibaly, Diabaté (CIV)
6 August 2016; 21:50	3× (yellow card) 5× (suspension)	Report	1× (yellow card) 6× (suspension)	Future Arena, Rio de Janeiro; Referees: Coulibaly, Diabaté (CIV)

8 August 2016; 09:30	South Korea	28–31	Sweden	Future Arena, Rio de Janeiro; Referees: Røen, Arntsen (NOR)
8 August 2016; 09:30	Woo 7	(15–16)	Hagman 7	Future Arena, Rio de Janeiro; Referees: Røen, Arntsen (NOR)
8 August 2016; 09:30	4× (yellow card) 3× (suspension)	Report	4× (yellow card) 5× (suspension)	Future Arena, Rio de Janeiro; Referees: Røen, Arntsen (NOR)

10 August 2016; 14:40	Russia	36–34	Sweden	Future Arena, Rio de Janeiro; Referees: Pinto, Menezes (BRA)
10 August 2016; 14:40	Bobrovnikova, Dmitriyeva 6	(15–18)	Gulldén 11	Future Arena, Rio de Janeiro; Referees: Pinto, Menezes (BRA)
10 August 2016; 14:40	4× (yellow card) 3× (suspension) 1× (red card)	Report	3× (yellow card) 6× (suspension) 1× (red card)	Future Arena, Rio de Janeiro; Referees: Pinto, Menezes (BRA)

12 August 2016; 11:30	Sweden	29–29	Netherlands	Future Arena, Rio de Janeiro; Referees: Alpaidze, Berekzina (RUS)
12 August 2016; 11:30	Hagman 14	(16–13)	Malestein 5	Future Arena, Rio de Janeiro; Referees: Alpaidze, Berekzina (RUS)
12 August 2016; 11:30	3× (yellow card) 3× (suspension)	Report	2× (yellow card) 1× (suspension)	Future Arena, Rio de Janeiro; Referees: Alpaidze, Berekzina (RUS)

14 August 2016; 11:30	Sweden	25–27	France	Future Arena, Rio de Janeiro; Referees: Røen, Arntsen (NOR)
14 August 2016; 11:30	Roberts 8	(13–15)	Lacrabère 8	Future Arena, Rio de Janeiro; Referees: Røen, Arntsen (NOR)
14 August 2016; 11:30	2× (yellow card) 2× (suspension)	Report	4× (yellow card) 1× (suspension)	Future Arena, Rio de Janeiro; Referees: Røen, Arntsen (NOR)

Quarterfinal

16 August 2016; 17:00	Sweden	20–33	Norway	Future Arena, Rio de Janeiro; Referees: Bonaventura, Bonaventura (FRA)
16 August 2016; 17:00	Gulldén 9	(7–19)	Oftedal 6	Future Arena, Rio de Janeiro; Referees: Bonaventura, Bonaventura (FRA)
16 August 2016; 17:00	3× (yellow card) 1× (suspension)	Report	2× (yellow card) 1× (suspension)	Future Arena, Rio de Janeiro; Referees: Bonaventura, Bonaventura (FRA)

== Judo ==
Sweden has qualified four judokas for each of the following weight classes at the Games. Brothers Robin and Martin Pacek, along with London 2012 Olympian Marcus Nyman, were ranked among the top 22 eligible judokas for men in the IJF World Rankings of 30 May 2016, while Mia Hermansson at women's half-middleweight (63 kg) earned a continental quota spot from the European region, as the highest-ranked Swedish judoka outside of direct qualifying position.

Athlete	Event	Round of 64	Round of 32	Round of 16	Quarterfinals	Semifinals	Repechage	Final / BM	
Athlete	Event	Opposition Result	Opposition Result	Opposition Result	Opposition Result	Opposition Result	Opposition Result	Opposition Result	Rank
Robin Pacek	Men's −81 kg	Bye	Stevens (USA); L 000–001	Did not advance					
Marcus Nyman	Men's −90 kg	Bye	Juraev (UZB); W 101–001	Yovo (BEN); W 100–000	Cheng Xz (CHN); L 000–100	Did not advance	Iddir (FRA); W 100–000	Gwak D-h (KOR); L 000–100	5
Martin Pacek	Men's −100 kg	Bye	Cho G-h (KOR); L 000–000 S	Did not advance					
Mia Hermansson	Women's −63 kg	—N/a	Gwend (ITA); L 000–101	Did not advance					

== Rowing ==
Sweden has qualified one boat in the women's single sculls for the Olympics at the 2015 FISA World Championships in Lac d'Aiguebelette, France.

Athlete	Event	Heats		Repechage		Quarterfinals		Semifinals		Final	
Athlete	Event	Time	Rank	Time	Rank	Time	Rank	Time	Rank	Time	Rank
Anna Malvina Svennung	Women's single sculls	8:48.46	5 R	7:46.35	1 QF	7:38.07	4 SC/D	8:00.41	2 FC	7:32.54	15

Qualification Legend: FA=Final A (medal); FB=Final B (non-medal); FC=Final C (non-medal); FD=Final D (non-medal); FE=Final E (non-medal); FF=Final F (non-medal); SA/B=Semifinals A/B; SC/D=Semifinals C/D; SE/F=Semifinals E/F; QF=Quarterfinals; R=Repechage

== Sailing ==
Swedish sailors have qualified one boat in each of the following classes through the 2014 ISAF Sailing World Championships, the individual fleet Worlds, and European qualifying regattas. In December 2015, the Swedish Olympic Committee (SOK) had announced the names of six crews to be selected to the Rio regatta, including 2012 Olympic champion Max Salminen, while Laser sailor Jesper Stålheim joined the fleet four months later in another Olympic selection.

Men

Athlete	Event	Race											Net points	Final rank
Athlete	Event	1	2	3	4	5	6	7	8	9	10	M*	Net points	Final rank
Jesper Stålheim	Laser	10	23	26	29	10	15	2	3	20	~~31~~	EL	137	16
Max Salminen	Finn	~~15~~	11	13	9	7	4	6	11	7	5	16	90	6
Fredrik Bergström; Anton Dahlberg	470	22	8	2	4	8	~~27~~	1	5	8	11	10	106	6

Women

Athlete	Event	Race													Net points	Final rank
Athlete	Event	1	2	3	4	5	6	7	8	9	10	11	12	M*	Net points	Final rank
Josefin Olsson	Laser Radial	17	6	8	17	7	4	3	14	~~20~~	9	—N/a		6	90	6
Lisa Ericson; Hanna Klinga	49erFX	11	6	9	15	3	9	10	2	~~16~~	14	9	15	EL	103	11

M = Medal race; EL = Eliminated – did not advance into the medal race

== Shooting ==
Swedish shooters have achieved quota places for the following events by virtue of their best finishes at the 2014 and 2015 ISSF World Championships, the 2015 ISSF World Cup series, and European Championships or Games, as long as they obtained a minimum qualifying score (MQS) by 31 March 2016.

On 14 November 2015, skeet shooters Stefan Nilsson and Marcus Svensson were among the initial batch of Swedish athletes to assure their selection to the Olympic team. Initially, Sweden secured a quota place in the women's 10 m air rifle, but the Swedish Olympic Committee chose to exchange it with the men's double trap instead based on performances throughout the qualifying period. The slot was awarded to London 2012 silver medalist Håkan Dahlby.

Athlete	Event	Qualification		Semifinal		Final	
Athlete	Event	Points	Rank	Points	Rank	Points	Rank
Håkan Dahlby	Men's double trap	121	18	Did not advance			
Stefan Nilsson	Men's skeet	121	=3 Q	14 (+3)	=5	Did not advance	
Marcus Svensson	Men's skeet	123 OR	=1 Q	16	=1 Q	15	2nd place, silver medalist(s)

Qualification Legend: Q = Qualify for the next round; q = Qualify for the bronze medal (shotgun)

== Swimming ==
Swedish swimmers have so far achieved qualifying standards in the following events (up to a maximum of 2 swimmers in each event at the Olympic Qualifying Time (OQT), and potentially 1 at the Olympic Selection Time (OST)):

A total of eleven Swedish swimmers (two men and nine women) were selected to the Olympic team with Therese Alshammar becoming the first female ever to compete in her sixth straight Games. The swimming roster also featured current world record holder Sarah Sjöström in the women's 100 m butterfly.

Men

Athlete	Event	Heat		Semifinal		Final	
Athlete	Event	Time	Rank	Time	Rank	Time	Rank
Erik Persson	100 m breaststroke	1:01.20	32	Did not advance			
Erik Persson	200 m breaststroke	2:10.15 NR	12 Q	2:10.12 NR	11	Did not advance	
Simon Sjödin	200 m butterfly	1:56.46 NR	13 Q	1:56.71	12	Did not advance	
Simon Sjödin	200 m individual medley	1:59.41	10 Q	2:00.81	16	Did not advance	

Women

Athlete	Event	Heat		Semifinal		Final	
Athlete	Event	Time	Rank	Time	Rank	Time	Rank
Therese Alshammar	50 m freestyle	24.73	12 Q	24.72	15	Did not advance	
Michelle Coleman	100 m freestyle	DNS		Did not advance			
Michelle Coleman	200 m freestyle	1:56.54	7 Q	1:56.05	5 Q	1:56.27	7
Stina Gardell	200 m individual medley	2:14.41	20	Did not advance			
Louise Hansson	100 m butterfly	59.73	31	Did not advance			
Louise Hansson	200 m individual medley	2:15.66	29	Did not advance			
Sophie Hansson	100 m breaststroke	1:08.67	26	Did not advance			
Sophie Hansson	200 m breaststroke	2:30.59	26	Did not advance			
Jennie Johansson	100 m breaststroke	1:06.84	10 Q	1:07.06	9	Did not advance	
Sarah Sjöström	50 m freestyle	24.66	10 Q	24.69	13	Did not advance	
Sarah Sjöström	100 m freestyle	53.37	3 Q	53.16	4 Q	52.99	3rd place, bronze medalist(s)
Sarah Sjöström	200 m freestyle	1:56.11	3 Q	1:54.65	1 Q	1:54.08 NR	2nd place, silver medalist(s)
Sarah Sjöström	100 m butterfly	56.26	1 Q	55.84 OR	1 Q	55.48 WR	1st place, gold medalist(s)
Michelle Coleman; Louise Hansson; Ida Lindborg*; Ida Marko Varga; Sarah Sjöström	4 × 100 m freestyle relay	3:36.42	6 Q	—N/a		3:35.90	5
Michelle Coleman; Louise Hansson; Ida Marko Varga; Sarah Sjöström	4 × 200 m freestyle relay	7:53.43	8 Q	—N/a		7:50.26	5
Michelle Coleman; Louise Hansson; Jennie Johansson; Sarah Sjöström	4 × 100 m medley relay	3:59.45	9	—N/a		Did not advance	

== Table tennis ==
Sweden has entered three athletes into the table tennis competition at the Games. Pär Gerell and Li Fen secured one of the ten available Olympic berths each in the men's and women's singles, respectively, while Matilda Ekholm rounded out the Olympic lineup by winning the repechage play-off match at the European Qualification Tournament in Halmstad. Kristian Karlsson was automatically selected among the top 22 eligible players to join Gerell in the men's singles based on the ITTF Olympic Rankings.

Mattias Karlsson was awarded the third spot to build the men's team for the Games by virtue of a top 10 national finish outside the continental zones in the ITTF Olympic Rankings. Anton Källberg has been selected as reserve in the men's team event.

Athlete	Event	Preliminary	Round 1	Round 2	Round 3	Round of 16	Quarterfinals	Semifinals	Final / BM	
Athlete	Event	Opposition Result	Opposition Result	Opposition Result	Opposition Result	Opposition Result	Opposition Result	Opposition Result	Opposition Result	Rank
Pär Gerell	Men's singles	Bye		Calderano (BRA); L 1–4	Did not advance					
Kristian Karlsson	Men's singles	Bye		Wang Jn (CGO); W 4–1	Samsonov (BLR); L 2–4	Did not advance				
Pär Gerell; Kristian Karlsson; Mattias Karlsson	Men's team	—N/a				United States; W 3–0	South Korea; L 1–3	Did not advance		
Matilda Ekholm	Women's singles	Bye		Wu (USA); W 4–2	Jeon J-h (KOR); L 1–4	Did not advance				
Li Fen	Women's singles	Bye		Balážová (SVK); W 4–3	Li Xx (CHN); L 0–4	Did not advance				

== Taekwondo ==
Sweden entered two athletes into the taekwondo competition at the Olympics. Nikita Glasnović and 2012 Olympian Elin Johansson qualified automatically for in their respective classes by finishing in the top 6 WTF Olympic rankings.

Athlete	Event	Round of 16	Quarterfinals	Semifinals	Repechage	Final / BM	
Athlete	Event	Opposition Result	Opposition Result	Opposition Result	Opposition Result	Opposition Result	Rank
Nikita Glasnović	Women's −57 kg	Marton (AUS); W 4−0	Mikkonen (FIN); W 7−4	Jones (GBR); L 4−9	Bye	Alizadeh (IRI); L 1–5	5
Elin Johansson	Women's −67 kg	Tursunkulova (UZB); L 2–2 SUP	Did not advance				

== Tennis ==
Sweden has entered one tennis player into the Olympic tournament. Johanna Larsson (world no. 55) qualified directly for the women's singles as one of the top 56 eligible players in the WTA World Rankings as of 6 June 2016.

Athlete	Event	Round of 64	Round of 32	Round of 16	Quarterfinals	Semifinals	Final / BM	
Athlete	Event	Opposition Score	Opposition Score	Opposition Score	Opposition Score	Opposition Score	Opposition Score	Rank
Johanna Larsson	Women's singles	Cornet (FRA); L 1–6, 6–2, 3–6	Did not advance					

== Triathlon ==
Sweden has entered one triathlete to compete at the Games. London 2012 silver medalist Lisa Nordén was ranked among the top 40 eligible triathletes in the women's event based on the ITU Olympic Qualification List as of 15 May 2016.

Athlete	Event	Swim (1.5 km)	Trans 1	Bike (40 km)	Trans 2	Run (10 km)	Total Time	Rank
Lisa Nordén	Women's	19:17	0:53	1:01:18	0:40	37:55	2:00:03	16

== Weightlifting ==
Sweden received an unused quota place from IWF to send a female weightlifter to the Olympics, as a response to the vacancy of women's quota places in the individual World Rankings and to the "multiple positive cases" of doping on several nations. This marked Sweden's historic debut in women's weightlifting at the Games.

Athlete	Event	Snatch		Clean & Jerk		Total	Rank
Athlete	Event	Result	Rank	Result	Rank	Total	Rank
Angelica Roos	Women's −58 kg	84	13	110	11	194	12

== Wrestling ==
Sweden has qualified a total of seven wrestlers for each of the following weight classes into the Olympic competition. Three of them finished among the top six to book Olympic spots each in all women's freestyle events (except 48, 63, & 75 kg) at the 2015 World Championships. Meanwhile, four further wrestlers had claimed the remaining Olympic slots to round out the Swedish roster in separate World Qualification Tournaments; two of them at the initial meet in Ulaanbaatar and two more at the final meet in Istanbul.

Key:

- VT – Victory by Fall.
- PP – Decision by Points – the loser with technical points.
- PO – Decision by Points – the loser without technical points.
- ST – Technical superiority – the loser without technical points and a margin of victory of at least 8 (Greco-Roman) or 10 (freestyle) points.

Men's Greco-Roman

Athlete	Event	Qualification	Round of 16	Quarterfinal	Semifinal	Repechage 1	Repechage 2	Final / BM	
Athlete	Event	Opposition Result	Opposition Result	Opposition Result	Opposition Result	Opposition Result	Opposition Result	Opposition Result	Rank
Zakarias Berg	−85 kg	Akhlaghi (IRI); L 0−4 ^{ST}	Did not advance						21
Fredrik Schön	−98 kg	Dzeinichenka (BLR); W 3−1 ^{PP}	Kiss (HUN); W 3−1 ^{PP}	Guri (BUL); W 4−0 ^{ST}	Lugo (CUB); L 0−3 ^{PO}	Bye		Rezaei (IRI); L 1−3 ^{PP}	5
Johan Eurén	−130 kg	Bye	Popov (AUS); W 5−0 ^{VT}	López (CUB); L 0−3 ^{PO}	Did not advance	Bye	Nabi (EST); L 0−3 ^{PO}	Did not advance	8

Women's freestyle

Athlete	Event	Qualification	Round of 16	Quarterfinal	Semifinal	Repechage 1	Repechage 2	Final / BM	
Athlete	Event	Opposition Result	Opposition Result	Opposition Result	Opposition Result	Opposition Result	Opposition Result	Opposition Result	Rank
Sofia Mattsson	−53 kg	Bye	Adekuoroye (NGR); W 5−0 ^{VT}	Krawczyk (POL); W 3−1 ^{PP}	Maroulis (USA); L 0−5 ^{VT}	Bye		Zhong Xc (CHN); W 5−0 ^{VT}	3rd place, bronze medalist(s)
Johanna Mattsson	−58 kg	Malik (IND); L 1−3 ^{PP}	Did not advance						14
Henna Johansson	−63 kg	Bye	Hanzlíčková (CZE); W 4−0 ^{ST}	Mamashuk (BLR); L 1−3 ^{PP}	Did not advance	Bye	Larionova (KAZ); L 0−5 ^{VT}	Did not advance	10
Jenny Fransson	−69 kg	Bye	Store (NOR); W 3−0 ^{PO}	Focken (GER); W 3−1 ^{PP}	Dosho (JPN); L 1−3 ^{PP}	Bye		Yeats (CAN); W 3−1 ^{PP}	3rd place, bronze medalist(s)

== See also ==
- Sweden at the 2016 Summer Paralympics
