= Mads Hendeliowitz =

Swedish equestrian

Personal information
- Nationality: Sweden
- Discipline: Dressage
- Born: 14 January 1982 (age 43)
- Height: 1.78 m (5 ft 10 in)
- Weight: 76 kg (168 lb)

Mads Hendeliowitz (born 14 January 1982) is a Danish-born Olympic dressage rider who has been representing Sweden since 2010.

== Dressage ==
Mads Hendeliowitz competed at the 2016 Summer Olympics in Rio de Janeiro, Brazil, with an Oldenburg stallion Jimmie Choo. He finished 29th in the individual and 5th in the team competition. Mads was initially named as a reserve rider for the Rio Olympics. However, he went on to compete at the Games after his teammate Therese Nilshagen was unable to participate due to her horse Dante Weltino failing a pre-competition veterinary examination.

Hendeliowitz also participated at several Dressage World Cup Western-European league qualifiers. As of 2016, his best result is 5th place from Odense in 2016.

Hendeliowitz runs Segersta Equestrian in Bålsta, Sweden, along with Swedish dressage riders Jeanna Högberg and Karin Oljermark. He trains horses and riders up to grand prix level and holds clinics across Sweden. He has also trained Sweden's mounted police division.
