= Gil Hanse =

American architect

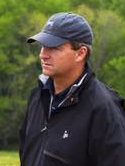
Gil Hanse

Gilbert Hanse (born August 12, 1963) is an American golf course designer. Hanse, along with his business partner Jim Wagner, was selected to design the Rio 2016 Olympic Golf Course, the first Olympic venue to host golf since 1904.

== Education ==
Hanse attended secondary school at Hunter Tannersville High School in Tannersville, New York. He earned his undergraduate degree from the University of Denver and his master's in landscape architecture from Cornell University in 1989. Hanse was the recipient of the William Frederick Dreer Award, which allowed him to spend a year in Great Britain studying the history of golf architecture.

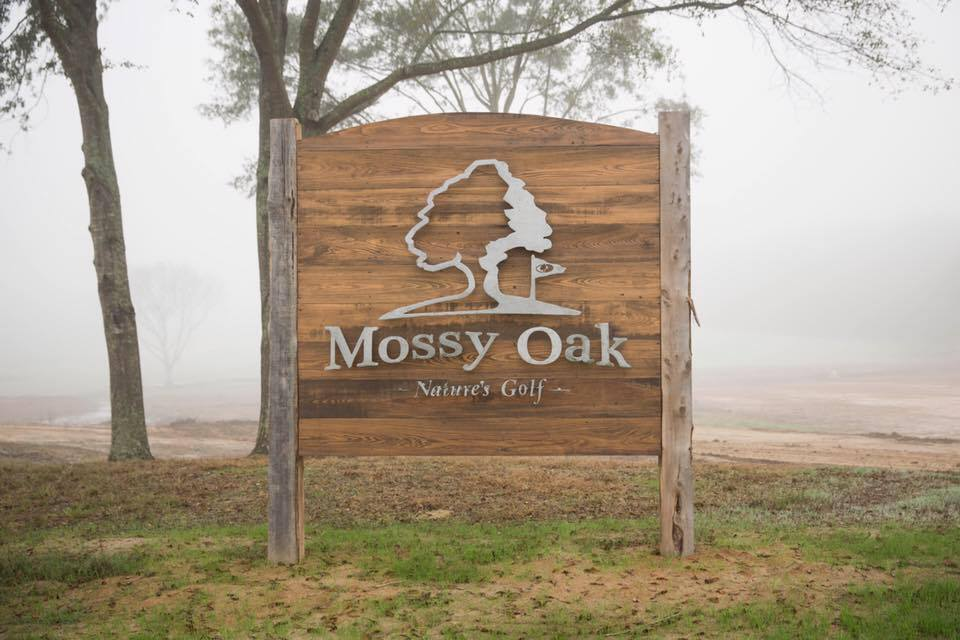
Gil Hanse's project, Mossy Oak Golf Club, at Old Waverly in West Point, Mississippi

== Golf Course Design ==
In 1993 Hanse founded Hanse Golf Course Design. His longtime design partner Jim Wagner joined the firm in 1995. Friend and golf historian Geoff Shackelford has also assisted in the design of several projects. Other members of the design team include Kevin Murphy, Ben Hillard, Bill Kittleman, Tom Naccarato, Amy Alcott. Hanse Golf Design's in house golf construction team is named Caveman Construction. He has mentored younger golf architects in various projects as shapers, notably Kyle Franz at The 2016 Rio Olympic Golf Course, Blake Conant at Oakland Hills Country Club (South), Kye Goalby at Pinehurst Number 4, Angela Moser at Los Angeles Country Club (South).

== Golf Courses (Original Design) ==
Sources:

- The Apogee Club, 2024
- Applebrook Golf Club, 2001
- Ban Rakat Club - Ballyshear, Thailand, 2021
- Boston Golf Club, Hingham, Massachusetts, 2005
- CapRock Ranch, Valentine, Nebraska, 2021
- Craighead at Crail Golfing Society, Scotland, 1998
- Castle Stuart, Scotland, 2009
- Childress Hall, Texas, 2025
- Circle T Ranch, Westlake, Texas, 2021
- DAMAC Hills, Dubai, United Arab Emirates, 2016
- Fields Ranch East at PGA Frisco, Texas, 2023
- French Creek Golf Club, Pennsylvania, 2004
- Golf Club of DBI, Tennessee, 2023
- High Grove, Florida, 2024
- Inniscrone Golf Club, Pennsylvania, 1998
- Jonathan's Landing Golf Club, Jupiter, Florida, 2021
- Ladera, Thermal, California, 2022
- Kinsale, Florida, 2024
- Les Bordes (New), France 2021
- Mossy Oak Golf Club, West Point, Mississippi, 2016
- Ohoopee Match Club, Georgia, 2018
- Olympic Golf Course, Brazil, Rio de Janeiro, 2016
- Pinehurst (The Cradle), North Carolina, 2017
- Prairie Club (Horse), Valentine, Nebraska, 2010
- Rustic Canyon, California, 2002
- Stonewall (Old Course), Pennsylvania, 1992
- Streamsong Black, Florida, 2017
- The Park West Palm, Florida, 2023

Amagansett Golf Club

== Golf Courses (Restoration) ==
- Aronimink Golf Club, Pennsylvania, 2018
- Baltusrol Golf Club (Lower) (Lower), New Jersey, 2020
- Baltusrol Golf Club (Upper), New Jersey, 2024
- Biltmore Forest Country Club, North Carolina, 2022
- Country Club of Rochester, New York, 2001
- Cobbs Creek, Pennsylvania, 2025
- Denison University Golf Course, Ohio, TBA
- Denver Country Club, Colorado, 2009
- Essex County, New Jersey, 2004
- Fenway Golf Club, New York, 1997
- Fishers Island Club, New York, 1995
- Gulph Mills, Pennsylvania, 2000
- Honors Course, Tennessee, 2022
- Kittansett Club, Massachusetts, 1995
- Lake Merced Golf Club, California, 2022
- Lakewood Country Club, Colorado, 1993
- Los Angeles Country Club (North), California, 2007
- Marion, Massachusetts, 2024
- Merion Golf Club (East), Pennsylvania, 2014
- Merion Golf Club (West), Pennsylvania, 2025
- Myopia Hunt, Massachusetts, 2011
- Oakland Hills Country Club (South), Bloomfield Township, Michigan, 2020
- Oakmont Country Club, Pennsylvania, 2024
- Olympic Club (Lake), San Francisco, California, 2024
- Quaker Ridge Golf Club, New York, 2002
- Palmetto Golf Club, South Carolina, 2007
- Plainfield Country Club, New Jersey, 1999
- Ridgewood Country Club, New Jersey, 1999
- Rockaway Hunting Club, 2009
- Rolling Green, Pennsylvania, 2021
- Sakonnet Golf Club, Rhode Island, 1999
- Savannah Golf Club, Georgia, 2018
- Sleepy Hollow Country Club, New York, 2006
- Southern Hills Country Club, Oklahoma, 2015
- St. George's Golf and Country Club, New York, 1999
- Taconic Country Club, Massachusetts, 2008
- The Creek, New York, 1997
- The Country Club, Ohio, 2023
- The Country Club, Massachusetts, 2009
- Tokyo Golf Club, Japan, 2008
- Waverley Country Club, Oregon, 2009
- Westhampton Country Club, New York, 2009
- Wianno Club, Massachusetts, 2012
- Winged Foot Golf Club (East), New York, 2014
- Winged Foot Golf Club (West), New York, 2017
- Worcester Country Club, Massachusetts, 2018
- Yale Golf Course, Connecticut, 2024
- North Hempstead Country Club, New York, 1994

== Golf Courses (Renovation) ==
- Burning Tree, Bethesda, Maryland, 2019
- Colonial Country Club, Fort Worth, Texas, 2024
- Gavea, Rio de Janeiro, Brazil, 2018
- La Costa (Champions), 2024
- Los Angeles Country Club (South), California, 2016
- Maggie Hathaway, Los Angeles, California, 2023
- Narin & Portnoo Links, Donegal, Ireland, 2020
- Pinehurst (Number 4), Pinehurst, North Carolina, 2016
- Royal Sydney, Australia, 2023
- Spanish Bay, Pebble Beach, California, 2024
- Soule Park, Ojai, California, 2005
- TPC Boston, Massachusetts, 2007
- Sewanee: The University of the South Golf Course, 2013
- Vineyard Golf Club, Massachusetts, 2015

== Golf Courses (Closed/No Longer Exist - NLE) ==
- The Capstone Club, Brookwood, Alabama, Opened in 2002 – Closed in 2014
- Tallgrass, Shoreham, New York, Opened in 2000 – Closed in 2017
