= Maria Verchenova =

Russian professional golfer

Personal information
- Nationality: Russia
- Born: 27 March 1986 (age 40) Moscow, Russia
- Height: 1.75 m (5 ft 9 in)

Career
- Sport: Golf
- Turned professional: 2006
- Former tour: Ladies European Tour

Best results in LPGA major championships
- Chevron Championship: DNP
- Women's PGA C'ship: DNP
- U.S. Women's Open: T47: 2015
- Women's British Open: T28: 2015
- Evian Championship: CUT: 2016

Maria Vitalyevna Verchenova (Russian: Мария Витальевна Верченова, born 27 March 1986) is a Russian professional golfer. She is the first Russian to become a full-time member of the Ladies European Tour. She has several top-10 finishes. She competed under her married name Maria Balikoeva from 2012 to 2015.

== Career ==
Verchenova qualified for the 2016 Summer Olympics. She shot a course record 62 in the 4th round and finished tied for 16th place.

== Amateur wins ==
- 2004 Russian Amateur
- 2005 Latvian Amateur, Slovenian Amateur
- 2006 Russian Amateur, Austrian Amateur
