= Reserva de Marapendi (Rio de Janeiro) =

Coordinates: 23°00′41.5″S 43°24′34.0″W

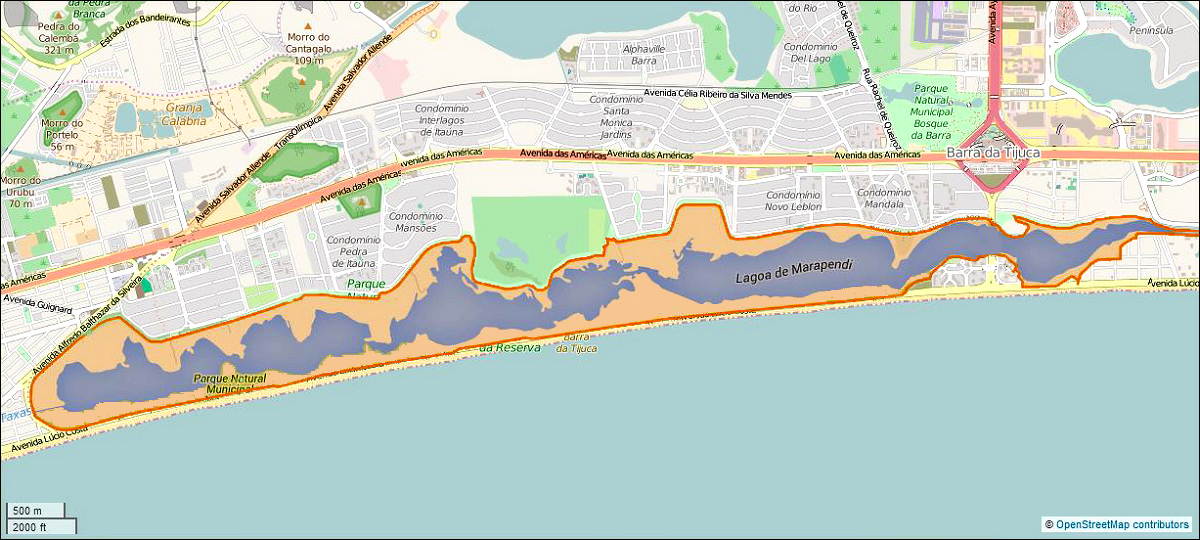
Marapendi Natural Reserve

The Marapendi Natural Reserve (Portuguese: Reserva de Marapendi) is a coastal nature preserve (environmental protection zone) of approximately 665.62 hectares, located in the Barra da Tijuca and Recreio neighborhoods of Rio de Janeiro, Brazil, established for the preservation of native plants and animals such as the Paraná and jacarandas pines, restinga, mangroves and the Channel-billed toucan.

The legal boundaries of the preserve extend over the Marapendi Natural Municipal Park (Portuguese: Parque Natural Municipal de Marapendi) and some developed areas with a small number of commercial tenants permitted within the inner sanctuary.

== 2016 Summer Olympics ==
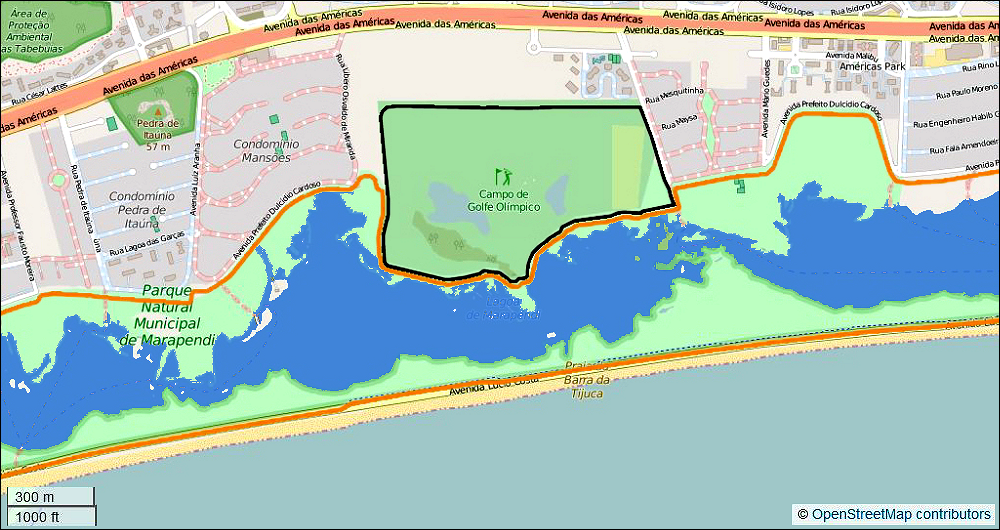
Marapendi Reserve Golf Course

The Olympic golf course is a new venue built for the golf tournaments of the 2016 Summer Olympics.

== Gallery ==
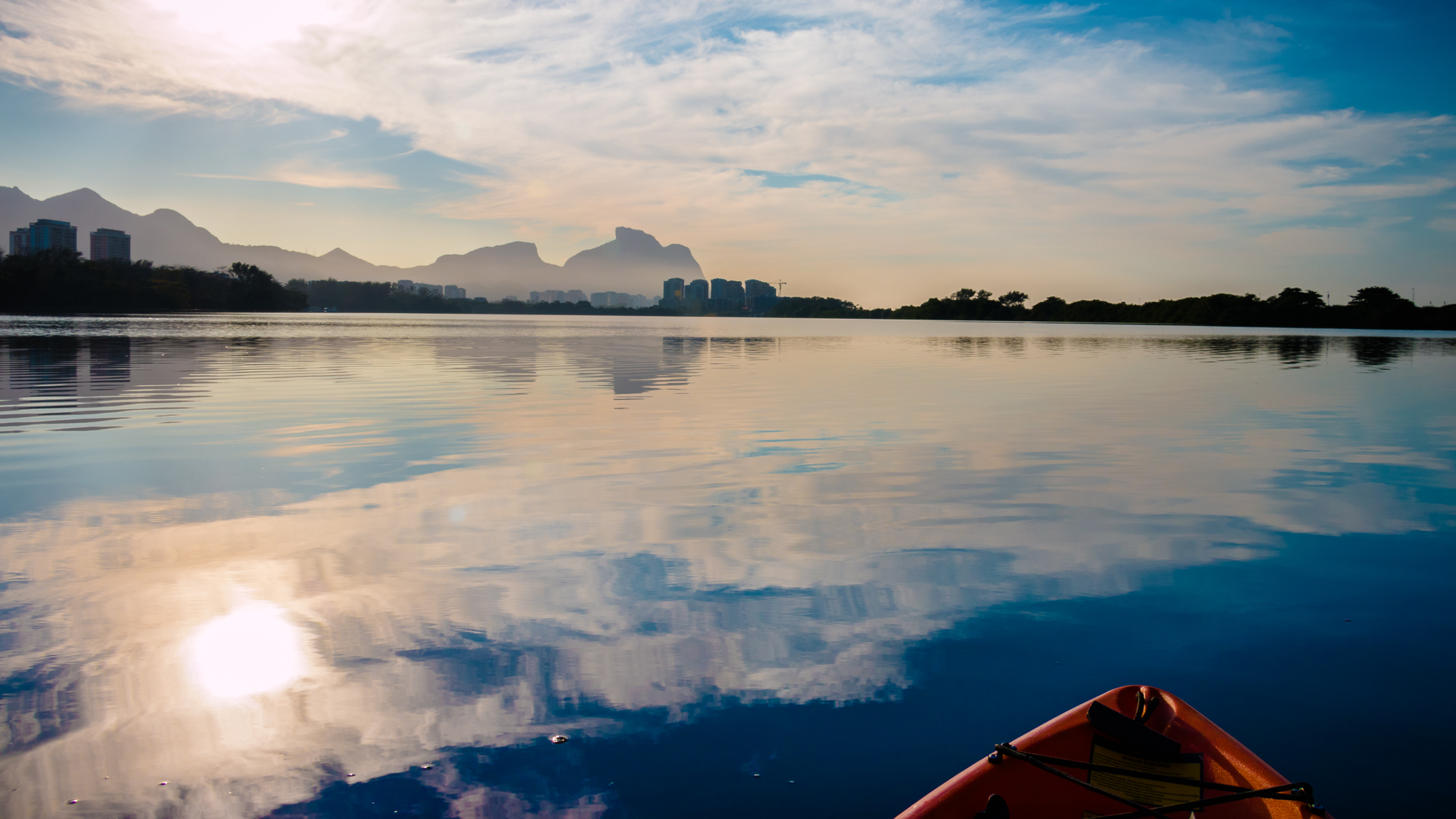
Marapendi Reserve

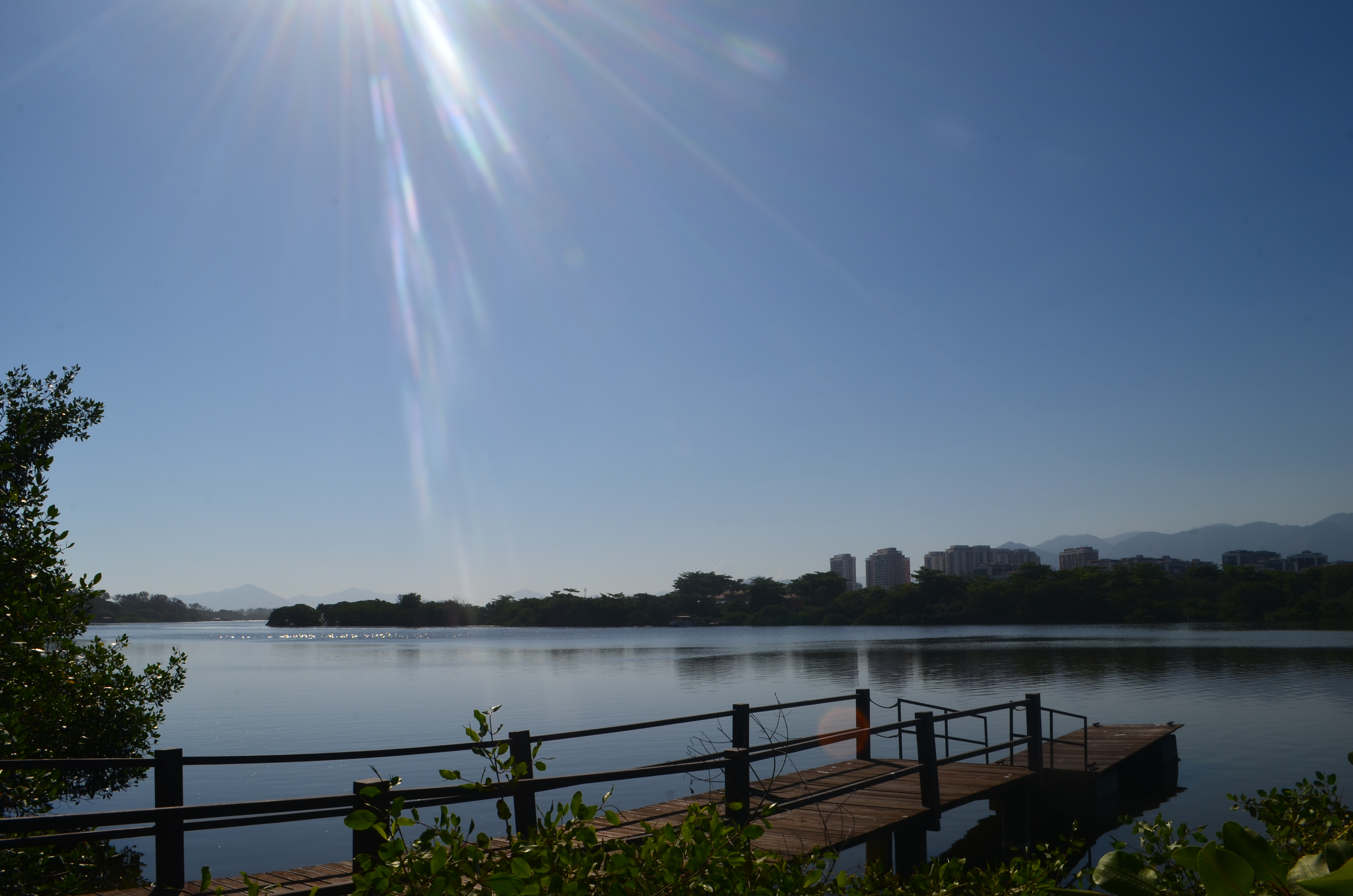
Marapendi Reserve

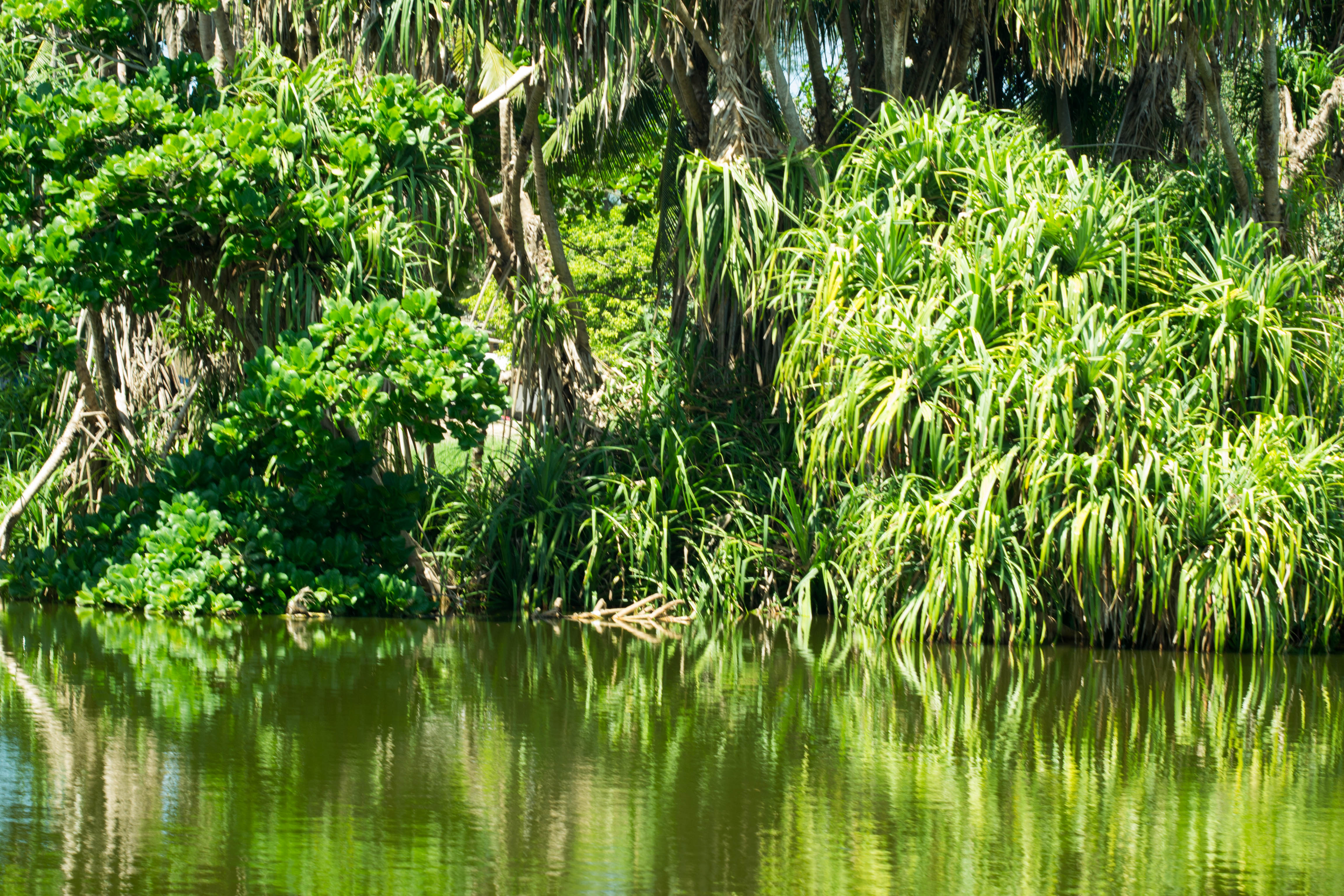
Marapendi Reserve

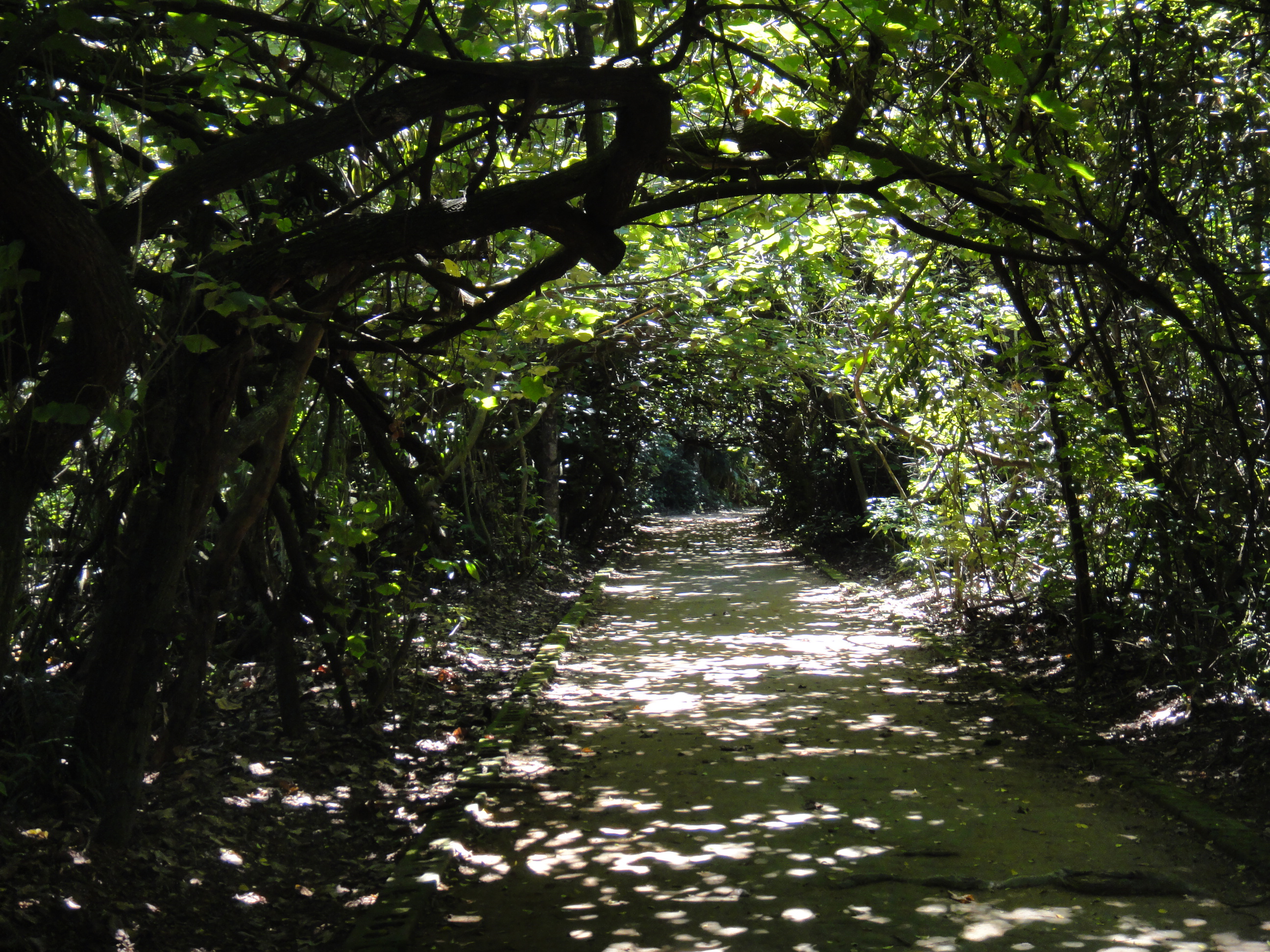
Marapendi Reserve
