= Squash at the 2018 Commonwealth Games – Women's singles =

Women's singles Squash 2018 Commonwealth Games
- 6th Women's singles squash at the Commonwealth Games
- Location: Gold Coast, Australia
- Venue: Oxenford Studios
- Date(s): 5 – 9 April 2018
- Website cwgsquash.net
- Category: XXI Commonwealth Games

The Squash at the 2018 Commonwealth Games was held at the Oxenford Studios, Gold Coast, Australia. Singles play took place between 5 and 9 April.

== Medallists ==
Gold	Joelle King; New Zealand
Silver	Sarah-Jane Perry; England
Bronze	Tesni Evans; Wales

== Seeds ==
1. Laura Massaro (ENG) (quarterfinals)
2. Joelle King (NZL) (gold medal)
3. Nicol David (MAS) (Fourth place)
4. Sarah-Jane Perry (ENG) (silver medal)
5. Alison Waters (ENG) (quarterfinals)
6. Tesni Evans (WAL) (bronze medal)
7. Donna Urquhart (AUS) (quarterfinals)
8. Joshna Chinappa (IND) (quarterfinals)
9. Dipika Pallikal Karthik (IND) (round of 16)
10. Samantha Cornett (CAN) (round of 16)
11. Amanda Landers-Murphy (NZL) (round of 16)
12. Sivasangari Subramaniam (MAS) (round of 16)
13. Nikki Todd (CAN) (round of 16)
14. Lisa Aitken (SCO) (round of 32)
15. Tamika Saxby (AUS) (round of 16)
16. Christine Nunn (AUS) (round of 16)

== Draws and results ==
=== Main draw ===
The draw.

==== Finals ====
Quarter finals
1	Laura Massaro (ENG)	8	8	11	13
6	Tesni Evans (WAL)	11	11	5	15
7	Donna Urquhart (AUS)	5	11	2	5
4	Sarah-Jane Perry (ENG)	11	7	11	11
3	Nicol David (MAS)	7	11	11	11	12
5	Alison Waters (ENG)	11	13	9	9	10
8	Joshna Chinappa (IND)	5	6	9
2	Joelle King (NZL)	11	11	11

Semi finals
6	Tesni Evans (WAL)	6	3	8
4	Sarah-Jane Perry (ENG)	11	11	11
3	Nicol David (MAS)	11	5	11	5
2	Joelle King (NZL)	13	11	1	11

Final
4	Sarah-Jane Perry (ENG)	14	8	11	13	8
2	Joelle King (NZL)	16	11	6	11	11
Third place
6	Tesni Evans (WAL)	11	3	12	11
3	Nicol David (MAS)	7	11	10	7

==== Top half ====
===== Section 1 =====
Round of 64
Amanda Haywood (BAR)	11	11	9	5	11
Caroline Laing (CAY)	9	5	11	11	7

Round of 32
1	Laura Massaro (ENG)	11	11	11
Amanda Haywood (BAR)	6	5	5
Mihiliya Methsarani (SRI)	10	9	4
11	Amanda Landers-Murphy (NZL)	12	11	11
14	Lisa Aitken (SCO)
Aifa Azman (MAS)	w/o
Taylor Fernandes (GUY)	5	7	3
6	Tesni Evans (WAL)	11	11	11

Round of 16
1	Laura Massaro (ENG)	11	13	11
11	Amanda Landers-Murphy (NZL)	8	11	8
Aifa Azman (MAS)	7	1	11	8
6	Tesni Evans (WAL)	11	11	6	11

Quarter finals
1	Laura Massaro (ENG)	8	8	11	13
6	Tesni Evans (WAL)	11	11	5	15

===== Section 2 =====
Round of 64

Round of 32
7	Donna Urquhart (AUS)	11	11	11
Faiza Zafar (PAK)	1	2	4
Dianne Kellas (MLT)	3	3	2
16	Christine Nunn (AUS)	11	11	11
13	Nikki Todd (CAN)	11	11	11
Khaaliqa Nimji (KEN)	4	8	7
Alison Mua (FIJ)	1	3	6
4	Sarah-Jane Perry (ENG)	11	11	11

Round of 16
7	Donna Urquhart (AUS)	6	11	7	11	11
16	Christine Nunn (AUS)	11	4	11	6	5
13	Nikki Todd (CAN)	10	3	5
4	Sarah-Jane Perry (ENG)	12	11	11

Quarter finals
7	Donna Urquhart (AUS)	5	11	2	5
4	Sarah-Jane Perry (ENG)	11	7	11	11

==== Bottom half ====
===== Section 3 =====
Round of 64
Colette Sultana (MLT)	11	11	11
Samantha Hennings (CAY)	7	3	4

Round of 32
3	Nicol David (MAS)	11	11	11
Colette Sultana (MLT)	1	4	2
Mary Fung-A-Fat (GUY)	5	2	4
10	Samantha Cornett (CAN)	11	11	11
9	Dipika Pallikal Karthik (IND)	11	11	11
Charlotte Knaggs (TRI)	6	5	5
Meagan Best (BAR)	5	1	8
5	Alison Waters (ENG)	11	11	11

Round of 16
3	Nicol David (MAS)	20	8	11	11
10	Samantha Cornett (CAN)	18	11	7	3
9	Dipika Pallikal Karthik (IND)	3	6	2
5	Alison Waters (ENG)	11	11	11

Quarter finals
3	Nicol David (MAS)	7	11	11	11	12
5	Alison Waters (ENG)	11	13	9	9	10

===== Section 4 =====
Round of 64
Deon Saffery (WAL)	11	11	11
Madina Zafar (PAK)	8	4	6

Round of 32
8	Joshna Chinappa (IND)	11	11	11
Lynette Vai (PNG)	3	7	2
Eilidh Bridgeman (CAY)	4	2	1
15	Tamika Saxby (AUS)	11	11	11
12	Sivasangari Subramaniam (MAS)	11	11	11	11
Alison Thomson (SCO)	7	13	8	8
Deon Saffery (WAL)	3	4	2
2	Joelle King (NZL)	11	11	11

Round of 16
8	Joshna Chinappa (IND)	11	11	11
15	Tamika Saxby (AUS)	6	8	4
12	Sivasangari Subramaniam (MAS)	3	11	7	3
2	Joelle King (NZL)	11	9	11	11

Quarter finals
8	Joshna Chinappa (IND)	5	6	9
2	Joelle King (NZL)	11	11	11
