= Squash at the 2018 Commonwealth Games – Women's doubles =

Women's doubles Squash 2018 Commonwealth Games
- 6th Women's doubles squash at the Commonwealth Games
- Location: Gold Coast, Australia
- Venue: Oxenford Studios
- Date(s): 10 – 15 April 2018
- Website cwgsquash.net
- Category: XXI Commonwealth Games

The Women's doubles Squash event at the 2018 Commonwealth Games was held at the Oxenford Studios, Gold Coast from 10 to 15 April.

== Medalists ==
Gold	New Zealand; Joelle King; Amanda Landers-Murphy
Silver	India; Joshna Chinappa; Dipika Pallikal Karthik
Bronze	Australia; Rachael Grinham; Donna Urquhart

== Seeds ==
1. Joelle King / Amanda Landers-Murphy (NZL) (gold medal)
2. Jenny Duncalf / Alison Waters (ENG) (quarterfinals)
3. Joshna Chinappa / Dipika Pallikal Karthik (IND) (silver medal)
4. Rachael Grinham / Donna Urquhart (AUS) (bronze medal)
5. Samantha Cornett / Nikki Todd (CAN) (quarterfinals)
6. Tesni Evans / Deon Saffery (WAL) (quarterfinals)
7. Laura Massaro / Sarah-Jane Perry (ENG) (fourth place)
8. Sarah Cardwell / Christine Nunn (AUS) (group stage)
9. Rachel Arnold / Sivasangari Subramaniam (MAS) (quarterfinals)
10. Lisa Aitken / Alison Thomson (SCO) (group stage)
11. Faiza Zafar / Madina Zafar (PAK) (group stage)
12. Samantha Hennings / Marlene West (CAY) (group stage)

== Finals ==
Quarterfinals
9	Rachel Arnold (MAS); Sivasangari Subramaniam (MAS)	8	10
7	Laura Massaro (ENG); Sarah-Jane Perry (ENG)	11	11
3	Joshna Chinappa (IND); Dipika Pallikal Karthik (IND)	7	11	11
5	Samantha Cornett (CAN); Nikki Todd (CAN)	11	5	9
6	Tesni Evans (WAL); Deon Saffery (WAL)	11	10	3
4	Rachael Grinham (AUS); Donna Urquhart (AUS)	9	11	11
1	Joelle King (NZL); Amanda Landers-Murphy (NZL)	11	11
2	Jenny Duncalf (ENG); Alison Waters (ENG)	10	5

Semifinals
7	Laura Massaro (ENG); Sarah-Jane Perry (ENG)	10	5
3	Joshna Chinappa (IND); Dipika Pallikal Karthik (IND)	12	11
4	Rachael Grinham (AUS); Donna Urquhart (AUS)	9	5
1	Joelle King (NZL); Amanda Landers-Murphy (NZL)	11	11

Gold Medal Match
3	Joshna Chinappa (IND); Dipika Pallikal Karthik (IND)	9	8
1	Joelle King (NZL); Amanda Landers-Murphy (NZL)	11	11
Bronze Medal Match
7	Laura Massaro (ENG); Sarah-Jane Perry (ENG)	6	8
4	Rachael Grinham (AUS); Donna Urquhart (AUS)	11	11

== Group stage ==
=== Pool A ===
Team	MP	MW	ML	GW	GL	GD	PW	PL	PD
Rachel Arnold (MAS); Sivasangari Subramaniam (MAS)	2	2	0	4	1	+3	54	42	+12
Joelle King (NZL); Amanda Landers-Murphy (NZL)	2	1	1	2	2	0	42	36	+6
Sarah Cardwell (AUS); Christine Nunn (AUS)	2	0	2	1	4	−3	36	54	−18

Date		Score		Set 1	Set 2	Set 3
10 Apr	Joelle King (NZL); Amanda Landers-Murphy (NZL)	0–2	Rachel Arnold (MAS); Sivasangari Subramaniam (MAS)	10–11	10–11	
11 Apr	Joelle King (NZL); Amanda Landers-Murphy (NZL)	2–0	Sarah Cardwell (AUS); Christine Nunn (AUS)	11–8	11–6	
11 Apr	Sarah Cardwell (AUS); Christine Nunn (AUS)	1–2	Rachel Arnold (MAS); Sivasangari Subramaniam (MAS)	11–10	6–11	5–11

=== Pool B ===
Team	MP	MW	ML	GW	GL	GD	PW	PL	PD
Jenny Duncalf (ENG); Alison Waters (ENG)	3	3	0	6	0	+6	66	27	+39
Laura Massaro (ENG); Sarah-Jane Perry (ENG)	3	2	1	4	3	+1	64	52	+12
Lisa Aitken (SCO); Alison Thomson (SCO)	3	1	2	3	4	−1	62	57	+5
Eilidh Bridgeman (CAY); Caroline Laing (CAY)	3	0	3	0	6	−6	10	66	−56

Date		Score		Set 1	Set 2	Set 3
10 Apr	Jenny Duncalf (ENG); Alison Waters (ENG)	2–0	Lisa Aitken (SCO); Alison Thomson (SCO)	11–10	11–4	
10 Apr	Laura Massaro (ENG); Sarah-Jane Perry (ENG)	2–0	Eilidh Bridgeman (CAY); Caroline Laing (CAY)	11–2	11–2	
11 Apr	Jenny Duncalf (ENG); Alison Waters (ENG)	2–0	Laura Massaro (ENG); Sarah-Jane Perry (ENG)	11–4	11–7	
11 Apr	Lisa Aitken (SCO); Alison Thomson (SCO)	2–0	Eilidh Bridgeman (CAY); Caroline Laing (CAY)	11–2	11–2	
11 Apr	Jenny Duncalf (ENG); Alison Waters (ENG)	2–0	Eilidh Bridgeman (CAY); Caroline Laing (CAY)	11–0	11–2	
11 Apr	Laura Massaro (ENG); Sarah-Jane Perry (ENG)	2–1	Lisa Aitken (SCO); Alison Thomson (SCO)	9–11	11–8	11–7

=== Pool C ===
Team	MP	MW	ML	GW	GL	GD	PW	PL	PD
Joshna Chinappa (IND); Dipika Pallikal Karthik (IND)	3	3	0	6	2	+4	83	50	+33
Tesni Evans (WAL); Deon Saffery (WAL)	3	2	1	5	2	+3	71	42	+29
Dianne Kellas (MLT); Colette Sultana (MLT)	3	1	2	2	4	−2	5	22	−17
Faiza Zafar (PAK); Madina Zafar (PAK)	3	0	3	1	6	−5	45	69	−24

Date		Score		Set 1	Set 2	Set 3
10 Apr	Joshna Chinappa (IND); Dipika Pallikal Karthik (IND)	2–1	Faiza Zafar (PAK); Madina Zafar (PAK)	10–11	11–0	11–1
10 Apr	Tesni Evans (WAL); Deon Saffery (WAL)	2–0	Dianne Kellas (MLT); Colette Sultana (MLT)	11–0	11–5	
11 Apr	Joshna Chinappa (IND); Dipika Pallikal Karthik (IND)	2–1	Tesni Evans (WAL); Deon Saffery (WAL)	11–8	7–11	11–8
11 Apr	Faiza Zafar (PAK); Madina Zafar (PAK)	0–2	Dianne Kellas (MLT); Colette Sultana (MLT)	4–11	10–11	
11 Apr	Joshna Chinappa (IND); Dipika Pallikal Karthik (IND)	2–0	Dianne Kellas (MLT); Colette Sultana (MLT)	11–5	11–6	
11 Apr	Tesni Evans (WAL); Deon Saffery (WAL)	2–0	Faiza Zafar (PAK); Madina Zafar (PAK)	11–3	11–5	

=== Pool D ===
Team	MP	MW	ML	GW	GL	GD	PW	PL	PD
Rachael Grinham (AUS); Donna Urquhart (AUS)	3	3	0	6	1	+5	71	33	+38
Samantha Cornett (CAN); Nikki Todd (CAN)	3	2	1	5	2	+3	68	43	+25
Samantha Hennings (CAY); Marlene West (CAY)	3	1	2	2	4	−2	38	59	−21
Taylor Fernandes (GUY); Mary Fung-A-Fat (GUY)	3	0	3	0	6	−6	24	66	−42

Date		Score		Set 1	Set 2	Set 3
10 Apr	Rachael Grinham (AUS); Donna Urquhart (AUS)	2–0	Samantha Hennings (CAY); Marlene West (CAY)	11–2	11–3	
10 Apr	Samantha Cornett (CAN); Nikki Todd (CAN)	2–0	Taylor Fernandes (GUY); Mary Fung-A-Fat (GUY)	11–4	11–1	
10 Apr	Rachael Grinham (AUS); Donna Urquhart (AUS)	2–1	Samantha Cornett (CAN); Nikki Todd (CAN)	5–11	11–9	11–4
10 Apr	Samantha Hennings (CAY); Marlene West (CAY)	2–0	Taylor Fernandes (GUY); Mary Fung-A-Fat (GUY)	11–10	11–5	
11 Apr	Rachael Grinham (AUS); Donna Urquhart (AUS)	2–0	Taylor Fernandes (GUY); Mary Fung-A-Fat (GUY)	11–2	11–2	
11 Apr	Samantha Cornett (CAN); Nikki Todd (CAN)	2–0	Samantha Hennings (CAY); Marlene West (CAY)	11–6	11–5	
