= Squash at the 2014 Commonwealth Games – Women's singles =

Women's singles Squash 2014 Commonwealth Games
- 5th Women's singles squash at the Commonwealth Games
- Location: Glasgow, Scotland
- Venue: Scotstoun Sports Campus
- Date(s): 24–28 July 2014
- Website cwgsquash.net
- Category: XX Commonwealth Games

The Squash at the 2014 Commonwealth Games held at the Scotstoun Sports Campus, Glasgow. Singles play took place from 24 July to 28 July.

Top seed Nicol David defeated the 2nd seed Laura Massaro 12–10, 11–2, 11–4 in 46 minutes to win the gold medal.

== Medalists ==
Gold	Nicol David; Malaysia
Silver	Laura Massaro; England
Bronze	Joelle King; New Zealand

== Seeds ==
1. Nicol David (MAS) (champion)
2. Laura Massaro (ENG) (final)
3. Joelle King (NZL) (semifinals)
4. Alison Waters (ENG) (semifinals)
5. Low Wee Wern (MAS) (quarterfinals)
6. Dipika Pallikal (IND) (quarterfinals)
7. Madeline Perry (NIR) (quarterfinals)
8. Jenny Duncalf (ENG) (quarterfinals)
9. Rachael Grinham (AUS) (round of 16)
10. Kasey Brown (AUS) (round of 16)
11. Nicolette Fernandes (GUY) (round of 16)
12. Joshna Chinappa (IND) (round of 16)
13. Tesni Evans (WAL) (round of 16)
14. Samantha Cornett (CAN) (round of 16)
15. Delia Arnold (MAS) (round of 16)
16. Megan Craig (NZL) (round of 16)

== Draws & Results ==
=== Main draw ===
The draw.

==== Finals ====
Quarter finals
1	Nicol David (MAS)	11	11	5	11
8	Jenny Duncalf (ENG)	9	7	11	4
7	Madeline Perry (NIR)	6	4	6
3	Joelle King (NZL)	11	11	11
4	Alison Waters (ENG)	8	11	11	11
6	Dipika Pallikal (IND)	11	2	9	6
5	Low Wee Wern (MAS)	3	2	6
2	Laura Massaro (ENG)	11	11	11

Semi finals
1	Nicol David (MAS)	11	11	11
3	Joelle King (NZL)	6	8	5
4	Alison Waters (ENG)	5	14	3	8
2	Laura Massaro (ENG)	11	12	11	11

Final
1	Nicol David (MAS)	12	11	11
2	Laura Massaro (ENG)	10	2	5
Third place
3	Joelle King (NZL)	11	11	11
4	Alison Waters (ENG)	7	7	5

==== Top half ====
===== Section 1 =====
First round

Second round
1	Nicol David (MAS)	11	11	11
Vanessa Florens (MRI)	6	2	1
Safina Madhani (KEN)	1	2	2
16	Megan Craig (NZL)	11	11	11
14	Samantha Cornett (CAN)	11	11	11
Sarah Cardwell (AUS)	5	7	7
Amanda Lan.-Murphy (NZL)	2	0	8
8	Jenny Duncalf (ENG)	11	11	11

Third round
1	Nicol David (MAS)	11	11	11
16	Megan Craig (NZL)	7	6	5
14	Samantha Cornett (CAN)	4	5	7
8	Jenny Duncalf (ENG)	11	11	11

Quarter finals
1	Nicol David (MAS)	11	11	5	11
8	Jenny Duncalf (ENG)	9	7	11	4

===== Section 2 =====
First round
Shar. Chimfwembe (ZAM)	11	11	11
Dorothy Boyce (PNG)	4	7	9
Eva Alphonse (SEY)	1	1	3
Nadindi Udangawa (SRI)	11	11	11
Kimberley Bo.-Cauchi (MLT)	3	1	1
Deon Saffery (WAL)	11	11	11
Sarah Taylor (JER)	11	11	11
Violet Luchendo (KEN)	3	6	6

Second round
7	Madeline Perry (NIR)	11	11	11
Sharon Chimfwembe (ZAM)	3	2	4
Nadindi Udangawa (SRI)	3	6	3
10	Kasey Brown (AUS)	11	11	11
12	Joshna Chinappa (IND)	11	11	9	11
Deon Saffery (WAL)	9	6	11	9
Sarah Taylor (JER)	2	3	2
3	Joelle King (NZL)	11	11	11

Third round
7	Madeline Perry (NIR)	11	10	11	11
10	Kasey Brown (AUS)	4	12	8	5
12	Joshna Chinappa (IND)	3	8	11	5
3	Joelle King (NZL)	11	11	8	11

Quarter finals
7	Madeline Perry (NIR)	6	4	6
3	Joelle King (NZL)	11	11	11

==== Bottom half ====
===== Section 1 =====
First round
Colette Sultana (MLT)	11	12	11	9	2
Mihilia Methsarani (SRI)	9	10	13	11	11
Khaaliqa Nimji (KEN)	2	3	6
Anaka Alankamony (IND)	11	11	11
Naduni Gunawardane (SRI)	0	12	9	9
Charlotte Knaggs (TRI)	11	10	11	11

Second round
4	Alison Waters (ENG)	11	11	11
Eli Webb (PNG)	2	1	2
Mihilia Methsarani (SRI)	6	3	1
9	Rachael Grinham (AUS)	11	11	11
15	Delia Arnold (MAS)	11	11	11
Anaka Alankamony (IND)	6	8	6
Charlotte Knaggs (TRI)	4	2	1
6	Dipika Pallikal (IND)	11	11	11

Third round
4	Alison Waters (ENG)	11	2	14	11
9	Rachael Grinham (AUS)	5	11	12	9
15	Delia Arnold (MAS)	6	10	5
6	Dipika Pallikal (IND)	11	12	11

Quarter finals
4	Alison Waters (ENG)	8	11	11	11
6	Dipika Pallikal (IND)	11	2	9	6

===== Section 2 =====
First round

Second round
5	Low Wee Wern (MAS)	11	11	11
Eilidh Bridgeman (CAY)	1	2	2
Kerry Sample (TRI)	3	2	3
13	Tesni Evans (WAL)	11	11	11
11	Nicolette Fernandes (GUY)	11	11	11
Namweene Muchaile (ZAM)	4	3	3
Lynette Vei (PNG)	2	4	1
2	Laura Massaro (ENG)	11	11	11

Third round
5	Low Wee Wern (MAS)	11	11	12	11
13	Tesni Evans (WAL)	5	7	14	9
11	Nicolette Fernandes (GUY)	7	11	4	13
2	Laura Massaro (ENG)	11	7	11	15

Quarter finals
5	Low Wee Wern (MAS)	3	2	6
2	Laura Massaro (ENG)	11	11	11

== Plate ==
Semifinals
Vanessa Florens (MRI)	6	3	7
Deon Saffery (WAL)	11	11	11
Anaka Alankamony (IND)	11	11	11
Mihilia Methsarani (SRI)	4	6	7

Final
Deon Saffery (WAL)	7	11	11	11
Anaka Alankamony (IND)	11	3	8	1

=== Section 1 ===
First round	Second round						Quarterfinal
	Vanessa Florens (MRI)	11	11	11
	Safina Madhani (KEN)	4	2	4
							Vanessa Florens (MRI)	11	11	11
							Eilidh Bridgeman (CAY)	6	1	5
	Amanda Landers Murphy (NZL)	w/o	w/o	w/o	w/o	w/o
	Eilidh Bridgeman (CAY)

=== Section 2 ===
First round
Sarah Taylor (JER)	11	11	14
Kimberly Borg Cauchi (MLT)	5	7	12
Deon Saffery (WAL)	11	11	11
Dorothy Boyce (PNG)	4	4	6
Sharon Chimfwembe (ZAM)	11	11	11
Eva Alphonse (SEY)	3	2	8
Nadindi Udangawa (SRI)	12	12	11	11
Khaaliqa Nimji (KEN)	14	10	9	6

Second round
Sarah Taylor (JER)	5	X	X	X	RET
Deon Saffery (WAL)	11	X	X	X	X
Sharon Chimfwembe (ZAM)	8	3	6
Nadindi Udangawa (SRI)	11	11	11

Quarterfinal
Deon Saffery (WAL)	11	11	11
Nadindi Udangawa (SRI)	6	3	9

=== Section 3 ===
First round
Naduni Gudawardane (SRI)	3	4	5
Anaka Alankamony (IND)	11	11	11
Collette Sultana (MLT)	w/o	w/o	w/o	w/o	w/o
Charlotte Knaggs (TTO)

Second round
Anaka Alanmony (IND)	11	11	11
Charlotte Knaggs (TTO)	4	6	7
Violet Luchendo (KEN)	5	4	1
Eli Webb (PNG)	11	11	11

Quarterfinal
Anaka Alankamony (IND)	11	11	11
Eli Webb (PNG)	4	1	2

=== Section 4 ===
First round	Second round						Quarterfinal
	Mihilia Methsarani (SRI)
	Sarah Cardwell (AUS)	w/o	w/o	w/o	w/o	w/o
							Mihilia Methsarani (SRI)	11	11	11
							Lynette Vai (PNG)	6	3	4
	Namweene Muchaile (ZAM)	5	6	4
	Lynette Vei (PNG)	11	11	11

=== Consolation ===
Quarterfinals
Safina Madhani (KEN)	5	5	11	6
Kimberly Borg Cauchi (MLT)	11	11	9	11
Dorothy Boyce (PNG)	11	11	11
Eva Alphonse (SEY)	6	5	4
Khaaliqa Nimji (KEN)	8	11	11	9	8
Nadudi Gunawardane (SRI)	11	9	7	11	11
Violet Luchendo (KEN)
Namweene Muchaila (ZAM)	w/o	w/o	w/o	w/o	w/o

Semifinals
Kimberly Borg Cauchi (MLT)	w/o	w/o	w/o	w/o	w/o
Dorothy Boyce (PNG)
Naduni Gunawardane (SRI)	11	11	11
Violet Luchendo (KEN)	2	5	1

Final
Dorothy Boyce (PNG)	4	8	11	5
Naduni Gunawardane (SRI)	11	11	5	11
