= Volleyball at the 2011 Island Games – Men's tournament =

The Men 's tournament of the Volleyball competition at the 2011 Island Games was held from 26 June–1 July 2011 at the Fairway Sports Complex and Rew Valley Sports Centre.

== Participating teams ==
- Åland
- Bermuda
- Cayman Islands
- Faroe Islands
- Gotland
- Greenland
- Guernsey
- Isle of Wight
- Jersey
- Saare County

== Format ==
The ten teams were split into two groups of five, the first two of each pool advanced to the semifinals while the third, fourth and fifth team played placement games.

== Group stage ==
=== Pool A ===
Pos	Team	Pld	W	L	Pts	SW	SL	SR	SPW	SPL	SPR
1	Saare County	4	4	0	8	12	0	MAX	300	176	1.705
2	Faroe Islands	4	3	1	7	9	3	3.000	278	219	1.269
3	Gotland	4	2	2	6	6	9	0.667	310	314	0.987
4	Bermuda	4	1	3	5	5	9	0.556	261	316	0.826
5	Guernsey	4	0	4	4	0	12	0.000	203	327	0.621

Date	Time		Score		Set 1	Set 2	Set 3	Set 4	Set 5	Total
26 Jun	11:00	Bermuda	0–3	Saare County	11–25	18–25	20–25			49–75
26 Jun	15:30	Gotland	3–1	Guernsey	25–11	25–27	25–19	25–16		100–73
26 Jun	20:15	Faroe Islands	3–0	Bermuda	25–18	25–12	25–15			75–45
27 Jun	11:00	Faroe Islands	3–0	Gotland	26–24	25–15	25–21			76–60
27 Jun	18:00	Guernsey	0–3	Saare County	10–25	8–25	13–25			31–75
28 Jun	11:00	Saare County	3–0	Faroe Islands	25–14	25–23	25–15			75–52
28 Jun	15:30	Gotland	3–2	Bermuda	18–25	25–18	25–17	23–25	15–5	106–90
29 Jun	11:00	Bermuda	3–0	Guernsey	25–18	25–17	27–25			77–60
29 Jun	18:00	Saare County	3–0	Gotland	25–16	25–12	25–16			75–44
29 Jun	20:15	Guernsey	0–3	Faroe Islands	15–25	13–25	11–25			39–75

=== Pool B ===
Pos	Team	Pld	W	L	Pts	SW	SL	SR	SPW	SPL	SPR
1	Åland	4	4	0	8	12	0	MAX	300	190	1.579
2	Cayman Islands	4	2	2	6	8	7	1.143	323	309	1.045
3	Jersey	4	2	2	6	8	8	1.000	344	314	1.096
4	Greenland	4	2	2	6	7	8	0.875	319	318	1.003
5	Isle of Wight	4	0	4	4	0	12	0.000	145	300	0.483

Date	Time		Score		Set 1	Set 2	Set 3	Set 4	Set 5	Total
26 Jun	11:00	Isle of Wight	0–3	Åland	7–25	8–25	7–25			22–75
26 Jun	15:30	Greenland	1–3	Cayman Islands	23–25	25–21	21–25	22–25		91–96
26 Jun	20:15	Jersey	3–0	Isle of Wight	25–16	25–18	25–9			75–43
27 Jun	13:15	Jersey	2–3	Greenland	25–12	23–25	25–23	21–25	9–15	103–100
27 Jun	15:30	Cayman Islands	0–3	Åland	17–25	19–25	20–25			56–75
28 Jun	11:00	Åland	3–0	Jersey	25–22	25–18	25–19			75–59
28 Jun	18:00	Greenland	3–0	Isle of Wight	25–15	25–16	25–13			75–44
29 Jun	13:15	Cayman Islands	2–3	Jersey	25–18	26–24	17–25	15–25	13–15	96–107
29 Jun	15:30	Åland	3–0	Greenland	25–22	25–14	25–17			75–53
29 Jun	20:15	Isle of Wight	0–3	Cayman Islands	9–25	12–25	15–25			36–75

== Knockout stage ==
=== Bracket ===
Semifinals
June 30
Saare County	3
Cayman Islands	0
June 30
Åland	1
Faroe Islands	3

Gold medal game
July 1
Saare County	3
Faroe Islands	0
Bronze medal game
July 1
Cayman Islands	1
Åland	3

=== Semifinals ===
Date	Time		Score		Set 1	Set 2	Set 3	Set 4	Set 5	Total
30 Jun	11:00	Saare County	3–0	Cayman Islands	25–6	25–13	25–13			75–32
30 Jun	13:15	Åland	1–3	Faroe Islands	17–25	17–25	25–23	17–25		76–98

=== Ninth place game ===
Date	Time		Score		Set 1	Set 2	Set 3	Set 4	Set 5	Total
30 Jun	08:45	Guernsey	3–0	Isle of Wight	25–13	25–16	25–21			75–50

=== Seventh place game ===
Date	Time		Score		Set 1	Set 2	Set 3	Set 4	Set 5	Total
30 Jun	11:00	Greenland	3–0	Bermuda	25–14	25–13	25–23			75–50

=== Fifth place game ===
Date	Time		Score		Set 1	Set 2	Set 3	Set 4	Set 5	Total
30 Jun	18:00	Gotland	3–0	Jersey	25–22	25–21	25–23			75–66

=== Bronze medal game ===
Date	Time		Score		Set 1	Set 2	Set 3	Set 4	Set 5	Total
1 Jul	10:30	Cayman Islands	1–3	Åland	25–17	15–25	15–25	21–25		76–92

=== Gold medal game ===
Date	Time		Score		Set 1	Set 2	Set 3	Set 4	Set 5	Total
1 Jul	13:45	Saare County	3–0	Faroe Islands	25–12	25–19	25–12			75–43
