= Squash at the 2014 Commonwealth Games – Mixed doubles =

Mixed doubles Squash 2014 Commonwealth Games
- 5th Mixed doubles squash at the Commonwealth Games
- Location: Glasgow, Scotland
- Venue: Scotstoun Sports Campus
- Date(s): 29 July – 3 August 2014
- Website cwgsquash.net
- Category: XX Commonwealth Games

The Mixed doubles event at the 2014 Commonwealth Games was held at the Scotstoun Sports Campus, Glasgow from 29 July to 3 August.

Rachael Grinham and David Palmer of Australia defeated Alison Waters and Peter Barker of England 11–8, 11–10 to win the gold medal.

== Medalists ==
Gold	Rachael Grinham; Australia; David Palmer; Australia
Silver	Alison Waters; England; Peter Barker; England
Bronze	Kasey Brown; Australia; Cameron Pilley; Australia

== Seeds ==
1. Kasey Brown (AUS) Cameron Pilley (AUS) (semifinals)
2. Joelle King (NZL) Martin Knight (NZL) (semifinals)
3. Rachael Grinham (AUS) David Palmer (AUS) (champion)
4. Alison Waters (ENG) Peter Barker (ENG) (final)
5. Dipika Pallikal (IND) Saurav Ghosal (IND) (quarterfinals)
6. Sarah Kippax (ENG) Daryl Selby (ENG) (quarterfinals)
7. Amanda Landers-Murphy (NZL) Paul Coll (NZL) (quarterfinals)
8. Delia Arnold (MAS) Mohd Nafiizwan Adnan (MAS) (quarterfinals)
9. Frania Gillen-Buchert (SCO) Alan Clyne (SCO) (round of 16)
10. Joshna Chinappa (IND) Harinder Pal Sandhu (IND) (quarterfinals)
11. Deon Saffery (WAL) David Evans (WAL) (round of 16)
12. Samantha Cornett (CAN) Shawn Delierre (CAN) (round of 16)
13. Tesni Evans (WAL) Peter Creed (WAL) (round of 16)
14. Madeline Perry (NIR) Michael Craig (NIR) (round of 16)
15. Alex Clark (SCO) Kevin Moran (SCO) (round of 16)
16. Rachel Arnold (MAS) Valentino Bon Jovi Bong (MAS) (round of 16)

== Finals ==
Round of 16
1	Kasey Brown (AUS); Cameron Pilley (AUS)	11	11
15	Alex Clark (SCO); Kevin Moran (SCO)	2	10
9	Frania Gillen-Buchert (SCO); Alan Clyne (SCO)	9	11	5
7	Amanda L.-Murphy (NZL); Paul Coll (NZL)	11	9	11
5	Dipika Pallikal (IND); Saurav Ghosal (IND)	11	11
11	Deon Saffery (WAL); David Evans (WAL)	8	4
13	Tesni Evans (WAL); Peter Creed (WAL)	5	1
3	Rachael Grinham (AUS); David Palmer (AUS)	11	11
4	Alison Waters (ENG); Peter Barker (ENG)	11	10	11
14	Madeline Perry (NIR); Michael Craig (NIR)	5	11	8
12	Samantha Cornett (CAN); Shawn Delierre (CAN)	7	8
6	Sarah Kippax (ENG); Daryl Selby (ENG)	11	11
8	Delia Arnold (MAS); Mohd Nafiizwan Adnan (MAS)	8	9
10	Joshna Chinappa (IND); Harinder Pal Sandhu (IND)	11	11
16	Rachel Arnold (MAS); Valentino Bong (MAS)	6	1
2	Joelle King (NZL); Martin Knight (NZL)	11	11

Quarterfinals
1	Kasey Brown (AUS); Cameron Pilley (AUS)	11	11
7	Amanda L.-Murphy (NZL); Paul Coll (NZL)	1	8
5	Dipika Pallikal (IND); Saurav Ghosal (IND)	6	9
3	Rachael Grinham (AUS); David Palmer (AUS)	11	11
4	Alison Waters (ENG); Peter Barker (ENG)	11	11
6	Sarah Kippax (ENG); Daryl Selby (ENG)	5	7
10	Joshna Chinappa (IND); Harinder Pal Sandhu (IND)	11	8	6
2	Joelle King (NZL); Martin Knight (NZL)	7	11	11

Semifinals
1	Kasey Brown (AUS); Cameron Pilley (AUS)	7	4
3	Rachael Grinham (AUS); David Palmer (AUS)	11	11
4	Alison Waters (ENG); Peter Barker (ENG)	11	11
2	Joelle King (NZL); Martin Knight (NZL)	3	6

Gold Medal Match
3	Rachael Grinham (AUS); David Palmer (AUS)	11	11
4	Alison Waters (ENG); Peter Barker (ENG)	8	10
Bronze Medal Match
1	Kasey Brown (AUS); Cameron Pilley (AUS)	8	11	11
2	Joelle King (NZL); Martin Knight (NZL)	11	9	8

== Group stage ==
=== Pool A ===
Team	MP	MW	ML	MPO	GW	GL	GD	PW	PL	PD
Kasey Brown (AUS); Cameron Pilley (AUS)	2	2	0	2	4	0	4	44	22	+22
Rachel Arnold (MAS); Valentino Bon Jovi Bong (MAS)	2	1	1	1	2	2	0	34	40	-6
Nicolette Fernandes (GUY); Alexander Arjoon (GUY)	2	0	2	0	0	4	-4	28	44	-16

29 July 12:30
Team	1	2	3	Match
Cameron Pilley (AUS); Kasey Brown (AUS)	11	11		2
Nicolette Fernandes (GUY); Alexander Arjoon (GUY)	5	5		0
Report

30 July 13:00
Team	1	2	3	Match
Cameron Pilley (AUS); Kasey Brown (AUS)	11	11		2
Valentino Bon Jovi Bong (MAS); Rachel Arnold (MAS)	6	6		0
Report

31 July 12:00
Team	1	2	3	Match
Valentino Bon Jovi Bong (MAS); Rachel Arnold (MAS)	11	11		2
Alexander Arjoon (GUY); Nicolette Fernandes (GUY)	9	9		0
Report

=== Pool B ===
Team	MP	MW	ML	MPO	GW	GL	GD	PW	PL	PD
Joelle King (NZL); Martin Knight (NZL)	2	2	0	2	4	0	4	44	6	+38
Alex Clark (SCO); Kevin Moran (SCO)	2	1	1	1	2	2	0	28	22	+6
Sarah Taylor (JER); Nick Taylor (JER)	2	0	2	0	0	4	-4	0	44	-44

29 July 12:30
Team	1	2	3	Match
Martin Knight (NZL); Joelle King (NZL)	X	X	X	X
Nick Taylor (JER); Sarah Taylor (JER)	w/o	w/o	w/o	w/o
Report

30 July 13:30
Team	1	2	3	Match
Martin Knight (NZL); Joelle King (NZL)	11	11		2
Kevin Moran (SCO); Alex Clark (SCO)	3	3		0
Report

31 July 12:30
Team	1	2	3	Match
Kevin Moran (SCO); Alex Clark (SCO)	X	X	X	X
Nick Taylor (JER); Sarah Taylor (JER)	w/o	w/o	w/o	w/o
Report

=== Pool C ===
Team	MP	MW	ML	MPO	GW	GL	GD	PW	PL	PD
Rachael Grinham (AUS); David Palmer (AUS)	3	3	0	3	6	1	5	74	29	+45
Madeline Perry (NIR); Michael Craig (NIR)	3	2	1	2	4	4	0	73	66	+7
Marlene West (CAY); Cameron Stafford (CAY)	3	1	2	1	4	4	0	59	68	-9
Sharon Chimfwembe (ZAM); Manda Chilambwe (ZAM)	3	0	3	0	1	6	-5	32	75	-43

29 July 13:00
Team	1	2	3	Match
David Palmer (AUS); Rachael Grinham (AUS)	8	11	11	2
Marlene West (CAY); Cameron Stafford (CAY)	11	3	2	1
Report

29 July 13:00
Team	1	2	3	Match
Michael Craig (NIR); Madeline Perry (NIR)	9	11	11	2
Manda Chilambwe (ZAM); Sharon Chimfwembe (ZAM)	11	6	6	1
Report

30 July 12:30
Team	1	2	3	Match
David Palmer (AUS); Rachael Grinham (AUS)	11	11		2
Michael Craig (NIR); Madeline Perry (NIR)	3	7		0
Report

30 July 12:30
Team	1	2	3	Match
Cameron Stafford (CAY); Marlene West (CAY)	11	11		2
Manda Chilambwe (ZAM); Sharon Chiflambwe (ZAM)	2	4		0
Report

31 July 11:30
Team	1	2	3	Match
David Palmer (AUS); Rachael Grinham (AUS)	11	11		2
Manda Chilambwe (ZAM); Sharon Chiflambwe (ZAM)	2	1		0
Report

31 July 13:30
Team	1	2	3	Match
Michael Craig (NIR); Madeleine Perry (NIR)	10	11	11	2
Cameron Stafford (CAY); Marlene West (CAY)	11	8	2	1
Report

=== Pool D ===
Team	MP	MW	ML	MPO	GW	GL	GD	PW	PL	PD
Alison Waters (ENG); Peter Barker (ENG)	3	3	0	3	6	1	5	76	32	+44
Tesni Evans (WAL); Peter Creed (WAL)	3	2	1	2	5	2	3	69	48	+21
Collette Sultana (MLT); Bradley Hindle (MLT)	3	1	2	1	2	4	-2	36	61	-25
Charlotte Knaggs (TTO); Kale Wilson (TTO)	3	0	3	0	0	6	-6	26	66	-40

29 July 13:00
Team	1	2	3	Match
Peter Creed (WAL); Tesni Evans (WAL)	11	11		2
Bradley Hindle (MLT); Collette Sultana (MLT)	2	7		0
Report

29 July 13:30
Team	1	2	3	Match
Peter Barker (ENG); Alison Waters (ENG)	11	11		2
Kale Watson (TTO); Charlotte Knaggs (TTO)	0	2		0
Report

30 July 13:00
Team	1	2	3	Match
Kale Wilson (TTO); Charlotte Knaggs (TTO)	7	10		0
Bradley Hindle (MLT); Collette Sultana (MLT)	11	11		2
Report

30 July 14:00
Team	1	2	3	Match
Peter Barker (ENG); Alison Waters (ENG)	11	10	11	2
Peter Creed (WAL); Tesni Evans (WAL)	9	11	5	1
Report

31 July 12:00
Team	1	2	3	Match
Peter Barker (ENG); Alison Waters (ENG)	11	11		2
Bradley Hindle (MLT); Collette Sultana (MLT)	2	3		0
Report

31 July 12:00
Team	1	2	3	Match
Peter Creed (WAL); Tesni Evans (WAL)	11	11		2
Kale Wilson (TTO); Charlotte Knaggs (TTO)	2	5		0
Report

=== Pool E ===
Team	MP	MW	ML	MPO	GW	GL	GD	PW	PL	PD
Dipika Pallikal (IND); Saurav Ghosal (IND)	2	2	0	2	4	0	4	44	12	+32
Samantha Cornett (CAN); Shawn Delierre (CAN)	2	1	1	1	2	2	0	27	31	-4
Naduni Gunawardane (SRI); Ravindu Laksiri (SRI)	2	0	2	0	0	4	-4	16	44	-28

29 July 12:30
Team	1	2	3	Match
Saurav Ghosal (IND); Dipika Pallikal (IND)	11	11		2
Ravindu Laksiri (SRI); Naduni Gunawardane (SRI)	3	4		0
Report

30 July 13:30
Team	1	2	3	Match
Saurav Ghosal (IND); Dipika Pallikal (IND)	11	11		2
Shawn Delierre (CAN); Samantha Cornett (CAN)	3	2		0
Report

31 July 12:30
Team	1	2	3	Match
Shawn Delierre (CAN); Samantha Cornett (CAN)	11	11		2
Ravindu Laksiri (SRI); Naduni Gunawardane (SRI)	0	9		0
Report

=== Pool F ===
Team	MP	MW	ML	MPO	GW	GL	GD	PW	PL	PD
Sarah Kippax (ENG); Daryl Selby (ENG)	3	3	0	3	6	1	5	74	37	+37
Deon Saffery (WAL); David Evans (WAL)	3	2	1	2	5	2	3	66	40	+26
Kerry Sample (TTO); Colin Ramasra (TTO)	3	1	2	1	2	4	-2	34	52	-18
Vanessa Florens (MRI); Xavier Koenig (MRI)	3	0	3	0	0	6	-6	21	66	-45

29 July 13:00
Team	1	2	3	Match
David Evans (WAL); Deon Saffery (WAL)	11	11		2
Xavier Koenig (MRI); Vanessa Florens (MRI)	3	0		0
Report

29 July 13:30
Team	1	2	3	Match
Daryl Selby (ENG); Sarah Kippax (ENG)	11	11		2
Colin Ramasra (TTO); Kerry Sample (TTO)	1	4		0
Report

30 July 12:30
Team	1	2	3	Match
Daryl Selby (ENG); Sarah Kippax (ENG)	8	11	11	2
David Evans (WAL); Deon Saffery (WAL)	11	3	8	0
Report

30 July 13:00
Team	1	2	3	Match
Colin Ramsara (TTO); Kerry Sample (TTO)	11	11		2
Xavier Koenig (MRI); Vanessa Florens (MRI)	3	5		0
Report

31 July 11:30
Team	1	2	3	Match
David Evans (WAL); Deon Saffery (WAL)	11	11		2
Colin Ramasra (TTO); Kerry Sample (TTO)	1	6		0
Report

31 July 12:30
Team	1	2	3	Match
Daryl Selby (ENG); Sarah Kippax (ENG)	11	11		2
Xavier Koenig (MRI); Vanessa Florens (MRI)	6	4		0
Report

=== Pool G ===
Team	MP	MW	ML	MPO	GW	GL	GD	PW	PL	PD
Joshna Chinappa (IND); Harinder Pal Sandhu (IND)	2	2	0	2	4	0	4	44	27	+17
Amanda Landers-Murphy (NZL); Paul Coll (NZL)	2	1	1	1	2	2	0	40	28	+12
Eli Webb (PNG); Schubert Maketu (PNG)	2	0	2	0	0	4	-4	15	44	-29

29 July 13:00
Team	1	2	3	Match
Paul Coll (NZL); Amanda Landers-Murphy (NZL)	11	11		2
Schubert Maketu (PNG); Eli Webb (PNG)	2	4		0
Report

30 July 13:00
Team	1	2	3	Match
Paul Coll (NZL); Amanda Landers-Murphy (NZL)	8	10		0
Harinder Pal Sandhu (IND); Joshna Chinappa (IND)	11	11		2
Report

31 July 13:00
Team	1	2	3	Match
Harinder Pal Sandhu (IND); Joshna Chinappa (IND)	11	11		2
Schubert Maketu (PNG); Eli Webb (PNG)	5	4		0
Report

=== Pool H ===
Team	MP	MW	ML	MPO	GW	GL	GD	PW	PL	PD
Frania Gillen-Buchert (SCO); Alan Clyne (SCO)	3	3	0	3	6	0	6	66	26	+40
Delia Arnold (MAS); Mohd Nafiizwan Adnan (MAS)	3	2	1	2	4	2	2	62	43	+19
Eilidh Bridgeman (CAY); Daniel Murphy (CAY)	3	1	2	1	2	5	-3	42	69	-27
Lynette Vai (PNG); Suari Madoko Jr. Suari (PNG)	3	0	3	0	1	6	-5	44	76	-32

29 July 13:30
Team	1	2	3	Match
Mohd Nafiizwan Adnan (MAS); Delia Arnold (MAS)	11	11		2
Daniel Murphy (CAY); Eilidh Bridgeman (CAY)	5	3		0
Report

29 July 13:30
Team	1	2	3	Match
Alan Clyne (SCO); Frania Gillen-Buchert (SCO)	11	11		2
Suari Madoko Jr. Suari (PNG); Lynette Vai (PNG)	0	6		0
Report

30 July 12:30
Team	1	2	3	Match
Mohd Nafiizwan Adnan (MAS); Delia Arnold (MAS)	8	10		0
Alan Clyne (SCO); Frania Gillen-Buchert (SCO)	11	11		2
Report

30 July 13:30
Team	1	2	3	Match
Daniel Murphy (CAY); Eilidh Bridgeman (CAY)	11	10	11	2
Suari Madoko Jr. Suari (PNG); Lynette Vai (PNG)	9	11	5	1
Report

31 July 11:30
Team	1	2	3	Match
Alan Clyne (SCO); Frania Gillen-Buchert (SCO)	11	11		2
Daniel Murphy (CAY); Eilidh Bridgeman (CAY)	1	1		0
Report

31 July 13:00
Team	1	2	3	Match
Mohd Nafiizwan Adnan (MAS); Delia Arnold (MAS)	11	11		2
Suari Madoko Jr. Suari (PNG); Lynette Vai (PNG)	10	3		0
Report
