= Squash at the 2018 Asian Games – Women's team =

Women's team at the 2018 Asian Games
- Venue: Gelora Bung Karno Squash Stadium
- Dates: 27 August – 1 September 2018
- Competitors: 42 from 11 nations

Medalists
gold medal	Hong Kong; Annie Au, Joey Chan, Ho Tze Lok, Lee Ka Yi
silver medal	India; Joshna Chinappa, Tanvi Khanna, Sunayna Kuruvilla, Dipika Pallikal
bronze medal	Malaysia; Aifa Azman, Nicol David, Low Wee Wern, Sivasangari Subramaniam
bronze medal	Japan; Misaki Kobayashi, Risa Sugimoto, Satomi Watanabe

The women's team squash event was part of the squash programme and took place between 27 August and 1 September, at the Gelora Bung Karno Hall D.

== Schedule ==
All times are Western Indonesia Time (UTC+07:00)

Date	Time	Event
Monday, 27 August 2018	10:00	Preliminary round
Tuesday, 28 August 2018	10:00	Preliminary round
Wednesday, 29 August 2018	10:00	Preliminary round
Thursday, 30 August 2018	10:00	Preliminary round
Friday, 31 August 2018	11:00	Semifinals
Saturday, 1 September 2018	15:00	Gold medal match

== Results ==
=== Preliminary round ===
==== Pool A ====
Pos	Team	Pld	W	L	MF	MA	Pts	Qualification
1	Malaysia	4	4	0	12	0	8	Semifinals
2	Japan	4	3	1	8	4	6	Semifinals
3	South Korea	4	2	2	6	6	4	
4	Philippines	4	1	3	3	9	2	
5	Pakistan	4	0	4	1	11	0	

Source: Results

27 August	Malaysia	3–0	Pakistan

Nicol David	3–0	Madina Zafar	11–4, 11–3, 11–6
Aifa Azman	3–0	Riffat Khan	11–2, 11–2, 11–9
Low Wee Wern	3–0	Faiza Zafar	11–3, 11–3, 11–4

27 August	Japan	3–0	Philippines

Satomi Watanabe	3–1	Jemyca Aribado	11–9, 10–12, 11–8, 11–5
Risa Sugimoto	3–0	Rina Borromeo	11–0, 11–2, 11–2
Misaki Kobayashi	3–0	Aysah Dalida	11–9, 11–6, 11–1

27 August	Malaysia	3–0	Philippines

Nicol David	3–0	Jemyca Aribado	13–11, 11–7, 11–2
Sivasangari Subramaniam	3–0	Andrea Jemiolo	11–8, 11–2, 11–1
Low Wee Wern	3–0	Aysah Dalida	11–3, 11–2, 11–2

27 August	South Korea	3–0	Pakistan

Choi Yu-ra	3–0	Madina Zafar	11–9, 11–2, 11–6
Lee Ji-hyun	3–0	Riffat Khan	11–8, 11–6, 11–4
Ahn Eun-tschan	3–0	Faiza Zafar	11–5, 11–5, 11–4

28 August	Malaysia	3–0	South Korea

Sivasangari Subramaniam	3–0	Eum Hwa-yeong	11–7, 11–6, 11–4
Low Wee Wern	3–0	Choi Yu-ra	11–3, 11–6, 11–5
Aifa Azman	3–0	Lee Ji-hyun	11–7, 11–9, 11–6

28 August	Japan	3–0	Pakistan

Misaki Kobayashi	3–0	Faiza Zafar	11–6, 11–5, 11–3
Satomi Watanabe	3–0	Madina Zafar	11–7, 11–7, 11–1
Risa Sugimoto	3–1	Riffat Khan	11–3, 11–2, 8–11, 11–4

29 August	South Korea	2–1	Philippines

Lee Ji-hyun	3–0	Andrea Jemiolo	11–1, 11–8, 11–4
Eum Hwa-yeong	3–1	Aysah Dalida	9–11, 11–6, 11–8, 11–4
Ahn Eun-tschan	1–3	Jemyca Aribado	11–8, 13–15, 5–11, 9–11

29 August	Malaysia	3–0	Japan

Sivasangari Subramaniam	3–0	Risa Sugimoto	11–3, 11–5, 11–9
Low Wee Wern	3–0	Misaki Kobayashi	11–5, 11–1, 11–3
Nicol David	3–0	Satomi Watanabe	11–6, 12–10, 11–4

30 August	Japan	2–1	South Korea

Misaki Kobayashi	3–1	Ahn Eun-tschan	12–10, 8–11, 11–5, 11–8
Risa Sugimoto	1–3	Lee Ji-hyun	12–10, 7–11, 5–11, 8–11
Satomi Watanabe	3–0	Choi Yu-ra	11–7, 11–8, 12–10

30 August	Philippines	2–1	Pakistan

Aysah Dalida	2–3	Riffat Khan	11–8, 4–11, 11–7, 3–11, 11–13
Rina Borromeo	3–0	Amna Fayyaz	11–9, 11–8, 11–8
Jemyca Aribado	3–0	Faiza Zafar	11–6, 11–7, 11–6

==== Pool B ====
Pos	Team	Pld	W	L	MF	MA	Pts	Qualification
1	Hong Kong	5	5	0	14	1	10	Semifinals
2	India	5	4	1	13	2	8	Semifinals
3	Indonesia	5	3	2	7	8	6	
4	China	5	2	3	6	9	4	
5	Iran	5	1	4	5	10	2	
6	Thailand	5	0	5	0	15	0	

Source: Results

27 August	Hong Kong	3–0	Indonesia

Annie Au	3–0	Catur Yuliana	11–2, 11–4, 11–4
Lee Ka Yi	3–0	Irma Maryani	11–7, 11–8, 11–5
Ho Tze Lok	3–0	Yeni Siti Rohmah	11–5, 11–6, 11–4

27 August	India	3–0	Iran

Joshna Chinappa	3–0	Ghazal Sharafpour	11–7, 11–5, 11–6
Tanvi Khanna	3–0	Hadis Farzad	12–10, 11–7, 11–2
Dipika Pallikal	3–0	Fereshteh Eghtedari	11–2, 11–6, 11–4

27 August	China	3–0	Thailand

Li Dongjin	3–0	Anantana Prasertratanakul	11–5, 11–9, 11–8
Duan Siyu	3–0	Pranghatai Phongrattana	11–8, 11–2, 11–2
Gu Jinyue	3–0	Tuddaw Thamronglarp	11–5, 11–1, 11–3

28 August	Hong Kong	3–0	Iran

Ho Tze Lok	3–0	Fereshteh Eghtedari	11–4, 11–8, 12–10
Annie Au	3–0	Ghazal Sharafpour	11–1, 11–2, 11–5
Lee Ka Yi	3–1	Hadis Farzad	6–11, 11–5, 11–4, 11–2

28 August	India	3–0	Thailand

Sunayna Kuruvilla	3–0	Tuddaw Thamronglarp	11–2, 11–6, 11–2
Joshna Chinappa	3–0	Anantana Prasertratanakul	11–9, 12–10, 11–6
Tanvi Khanna	3–0	Pranghatai Phongrattana	11–3, 11–4, 11–2

28 August	China	1–2	Indonesia

Gu Jinyue	0–3	Yeni Siti Rohmah	8–11, 13–15, 7–11
Li Dongjin	3–0	Catur Yuliana	11–8, 11–9, 11–1
Duan Siyu	0–3	Irma Maryani	5–11, 7–11, 10–12

28 August	Hong Kong	3–0	China

Joey Chan	3–0	Gu Jinyue	11–6, 11–5, 11–4
Annie Au	3–0	Li Dongjin	11–2, 11–7, 12–10
Ho Tze Lok	3–0	He Xinru	11–4, 11–5, 11–8

28 August	India	3–0	Indonesia

Sunayna Kuruvilla	3–0	Irma Maryani	11–3, 11–9, 11–1
Dipika Pallikal	3–0	Yeni Siti Rohmah	11–5, 11–5, 11–7
Tanvi Khanna	3–0	Maudy Wafa Nadiyah	11–1, 11–3, 11–7

28 August	Iran	3–0	Thailand

Fereshteh Eghtedari	3–0	Pranghatai Phongrattana	11–3, 11–2, 11–4
Ghazal Sharafpour	3–1	Anantana Prasertratanakul	11–6, 11–6, 5–11, 11–8
Hadis Farzad	3–0	Suvipa Kitvijarn	11–2, 11–5, 11–6

29 August	India	3–0	China

Sunayna Kuruvilla	3–0	He Xinru	11–3, 11–6, 11–3
Dipika Pallikal	3–0	Duan Siyu	11–1, 11–4, 11–5
Joshna Chinappa	3–1	Li Dongjin	5–11, 11–8, 11–9, 11–6

29 August	Hong Kong	3–0	Thailand

Lee Ka Yi	3–0	Pranghatai Phongrattana	11–2, 11–2, 11–5
Ho Tze Lok	3–0	Tuddaw Thamronglarp	11–3, 11–3, 11–3
Joey Chan	3–0	Anantana Prasertratanakul	11–4, 11–4, 11–5

29 August	Iran	1–2	Indonesia

Hadis Farzad	3–0	Irma Maryani	11–7, 11–7, 11–5
Fereshteh Eghtedari	2–3	Yeni Siti Rohmah	7–11, 12–10, 11–7, 8–11, 8–11
Ghazal Sharafpour	0–3	Catur Yuliana	2–11, 4–11, 8–11

30 August	Hong Kong	2–1	India

Joey Chan	3–1	Dipika Pallikal	6–11, 11–7, 11–5, 11–9
Ho Tze Lok	2–3	Sunayna Kuruvilla	11–5, 15–13, 6–11, 9–11, 12–14
Annie Au	3–0	Joshna Chinappa	11–9, 11–6, 11–6

30 August	China	2–1	Iran

Gu Jinyue	3–2	Fereshteh Eghtedari	10–12, 6–11, 11–5, 11–7, 11–5
He Xinru	0–3	Hadis Farzad	7–11, 6–11, 11–13
Li Dongjin	3–0	Ghazal Sharafpour	11–6, 11–6, 11–4

30 August	Indonesia	3–0	Thailand

Yeni Siti Rohmah	3–0	Tuddaw Thamronglarp	11–1, 11–2, 11–2
Irma Maryani	3–0	Pranghatai Phongrattana	11–5, 11–6, 11–5
Catur Yuliana	3–0	Anantana Prasertratanakul	11–8, 11–7, 11–7

=== Knockout round ===
Semifinals			Gold medal match
A1	Malaysia	0
B2	India	2	B2	India	0
B1	Hong Kong	2	B1	Hong Kong	2
A2	Japan	0

==== Semifinals ====
31 August	Malaysia	0–2	India

Nicol David	2–3	Joshna Chinappa	10–12, 9–11, 11–6, 12–10, 9–11
Low Wee Wern	0–3	Dipika Pallikal	2–11, 9–11, 7–11

31 August	Hong Kong	2–0	Japan

Annie Au	3–1	Satomi Watanabe	11–6, 11–5, 12–14, 11–9
Joey Chan	3–1	Misaki Kobayashi	11–6, 7–11, 11–8, 11–1

==== Gold medal match ====
1 September	India	0–2	Hong Kong

Sunayna Kuruvilla	1–3	Ho Tze Lok	8–11, 6–11, 12–10, 3–11
Joshna Chinappa	0–3	Annie Au	3–11, 9–11, 5–11
