= Saana-Maria Sinisalo =

Finnish Paralympic archer

Personal information
- Born: 29 January 1971 (age 55) Åland, Finland

Sport
- Sport: Para archery
- Disability: Ehlers-Danlos syndrome
Medal record
Representing Aland
Island Games
Gold medal – first place	2011 Isle of Wight	Recurve individual
Gold medal – first place	2011 Isle of Wight	Recurve individual head-to-head
Gold medal – first place	2017 Gotland	Recurve knockout
Silver medal – second place	2017 Gotland	Recurve team
Bronze medal – third place	2011 Isle of Wight	Recurve team
Bronze medal – third place	2011 Isle of Wight	Recurve team head-to-head
Bronze medal – third place	2015 Jersey	Recurve individual
Bronze medal – third place	2015 Jersey	Recurve individual head-to-head
Bronze medal – third place	2015 Jersey	Recurve team
Bronze medal – third place	2017 Gotland	Recurve individual

Saana-Maria Katarina Sinisalo (born 29 January 1971) is a Finnish Paralympic archer who competes in international archery competitions. She has competed at the 2012 Summer Paralympics and has also competed at the Island Games.

In 2012, Sinisalo was the first sportswoman in para-sports to be featured on Finnish stamps as part of the 2012 Disability Sports stamp series which also featured other Paralympians, including blind judoka Jani Kallunki and Finnish wheelchair racer Leo-Pekka Tähti. She was the first woman to feature on Finnish stamps since 1994 when female skiers Marja-Liisa Kirvesniemi and Marjo Matikainen's joint stamp was issued. Since then, there has been no other para sportspeople featured on Finnish stamps.
