= Marlene West =

Jamaican-Caymanian squash player

Personal information
- Born: 8 June 1972 (age 54) Kingston, Jamaica

Sport
- Handedness: right-handed
- Turned pro: 1994
- Coached by: Dan Kneipp
- Highest ranking: 71 (May 2010)
Medal record
Women's squash
Representing Cayman Islands
Island Games
Gold medal – first place	2019 Gibraltar	singles
Gold medal – first place	2019 Gibraltar	mixed doubles
Gold medal – first place	2019 Gibraltar	team
Gold medal – first place	2013 Bermuda	doubles
Gold medal – first place	2013 Bermuda	mixed doubles
Gold medal – first place	2013 Bermuda	team
Silver medal – second place	2011 Isle of Wight	mixed doubles
Bronze medal – third place	2011 Isle of Wight	team
Central American and Caribbean Games
Gold medal – first place	2014 Veracruz	mixed doubles
Bronze medal – third place	2018 Cali	mixed doubles
Bronze medal – third place	2018 Cali	team
- Updated on 1 October 2019

Marlene West (born 8 June 1972) is a Jamaican-born squash player who has represented both Jamaica and Cayman Islands at the international competitions. She initially pursued her career in swimming and water polo before switching to squash. She has competed at the Commonwealth Games on five occasions representing Jamaica and Cayman Islands in two different time intervals. She is also a four time Cayman Islands national champion in the women's singles and she is regarded as one of the best squash players to have represented Cayman Islands. She has claimed medals in international events even after the age of 40's. She achieved her highest PSA career ranking of 71 in May 2010 during the 2010 PSA World Tour.

== Career ==
=== Jamaica (1987-2006) ===
Marlene started to compete in National Swimming Championships from 1987 and also captained the Jamaican national water polo team. However she pursued her major part of her career in squash and joined the Professional Squash Association in 1994. She represented Jamaica at the 2002 Commonwealth Games, which was her maiden Commonwealth Games appearance. Marlene also competed at the 2003 Pan American Games, which is her only appearance at a Pan American Games event. She also took part at the 2006 Commonwealth Games, which was also the last appearance she made for Jamaica before moving to Cayman Islands.

=== Cayman Islands (2006-present) ===
She represented the Cayman Islands at the 2010 Commonwealth Games which was also her debut Cayman Islands appearance at an international event. She then went onto compete at the 2014 and in the 2018 Commonwealth Games. She also competed at the 2012 Women's World Open Squash Championship and became the first player from Cayman Islands to compete at a World Open Squash Championship.

She made her Island Games debut in 2011 and claimed two medals at the event. Marlene claimed three gold medals at the 2019 Island Games at the age of 47 on her first Island Games event after six years due to the non inclusion of squash in 2015 and 2017 editions.
