= Alice Loveridge =

Guernsey table tennis player

Personal information
- Born: 6 July 1994 (age 32) Guernsey

Sport
- Country: Guernsey
- Sport: Table tennis
- Club: Guernsey Table Tennis Association
Medal record
Table tennis
Representing Guernsey
Island Games
Gold medal – first place	2007 Rhodes	Women's singles
Gold medal – first place	2011 Isle of Wight	Women's singles
Gold medal – first place	2011 Isle of Wight	Women's doubles
Gold medal – first place	2011 Isle of Wight	Mixed doubles
Gold medal – first place	2011 Isle of Wight	Mixed team
Gold medal – first place	2015 Bermuda	Women's singles
Gold medal – first place	2015 Bermuda	Women's doubles
Gold medal – first place	2015 Bermuda	Mixed team
Silver medal – second place	2015 Bermuda	Mixed doubles

Alice Edwards (née Loveridge; born 6 July 1994) is a former table tennis player from Guernsey who competed in international level events. She has represented Great Britain at the 2010 Summer Youth Olympics and Guernsey at the 2014 Commonwealth Games but did not medal in either tournament. She has also competed at the Island Games winning nine medals.
