= Sarah Taylor (squash player) =

Jersey squash player

Personal information
- Born: 5 July 1974 (age 52) Tameside, England

Sport
- Country: Jersey
- Handedness: Squash
Medal record
Women's squash
Representing Jersey
Island Games
Silver medal – second place	Isle of Wight 2011	singles

Sarah Taylor (born 5 July 1974) is a former Jersey female squash player. She represented Jersey at the 2014 Commonwealth Games, where she had competed in the women's singles and mixed doubles. In the mixed doubles, she partnered her husband Nick Taylor during the multi-sport event. Sarah Taylor is regarded as a finest squash player to have represented Jersey at international competitions especially winning a silver medal at the 2011 Island Games in the women's singles event.

Her husband, Nick Taylor is a former British squash player who has also served as a director of the squash sport in Jersey. Both of them have immensely contributed to the development of the sport in Jersey by introducing national squash championships such as Jersey Squash Classic.
