= Windsurfing at the 2011 Island Games =

Windsurfing at the 2011 Island Games was held from 27 June – 1 July 2011 at the Yaverland Sailing Club.

== Events ==
=== Medal table ===
Rank	Nation	Gold	Silver	Bronze	Total
1	Menorca	1	1	0	2
2	Bermuda	1	0	1	2
3	Guernsey	0	1	0	1
4	Jersey	0	0	1	1
Totals (4 entries)		2	2	2	6

=== Medal summary ===
Event	Gold	Silver	Bronze
Individual	Jonathan Dunnett (Menorca)	Daniel Harradine (GGY)	Scott Mello (BER)
Team	Bermuda; Neil Burnie; David Kendell; Scott Mello; Oliver Riihiluoma	Menorca; Jonathan Dunnett; Joan Perez; Marc Riera Pallàs	Jersey; Robert Ayliffe; Justin Horton; Michael Millar; Steve Pertegas-Melia
