= Sailing at the 2011 Island Games =

Sailing at the 2011 Island Games was held from 25 June – 1 July 2011 at the Yaverland Sailing Club & Sandown Bay.

== Events ==
=== Medal table ===
Rank	Nation	Gold	Silver	Bronze	Total
1	Anglesey	2	1	0	3
2	Bermuda	1	1	2	4
3	Åland	1	1	1	3
4	Menorca	1	1	0	2
5	Guernsey	0	1	1	2
6	Jersey	0	0	1	1
Totals (6 entries)		5	5	5	15

=== Medal summary ===
Event	Gold	Silver	Bronze
Laser Standard	Dyfrig Mon (Anglesey)	Dominic Breen-Turner (Anglesey)	Niklas Areschoug (ALA)
Laser Radial	Måns Lundberg (ALA)	Andrew Bridgman (BER)	Jason Saints (GGY)
Sailboarding	Jonathan Dunnett (Menorca)	Daniel Harradine (GGY)	Scott Mello (BER)
Sailboarding team	Bermuda	Menorca	Jersey
Team	Anglesey	Åland	Bermuda
