= Archery at the 2011 Island Games =

Archery at the 2011 Island Games was held from 27–30 June 2011 at the Newclose County Cricket Ground in the Isle of Wight, England.

== Events ==
=== Medal table ===
| Rank | Nation | Gold | Silver | Bronze | Total |
|---|---|---|---|---|---|
| 1 | Faroe Islands | 4 | 3 | 4 | 11 |
| 2 | Åland | 2 | 0 | 2 | 4 |
| 3 | Guernsey | 1 | 4 | 0 | 5 |
| 4 | Jersey | 1 | 2 | 1 | 4 |
| 5 | Isle of Man | 1 | 1 | 1 | 3 |
| 6 | Gotland | 1 | 0 | 3 | 4 |
| 7 | Menorca | 1 | 0 | 0 | 1 |
| 7 | Orkney | 1 | 0 | 0 | 1 |
| 9 | Isle of Wight | 0 | 1 | 1 | 2 |
| 10 | Shetland | 0 | 1 | 0 | 1 |
| Totals (10 entries) | | 12 | 12 | 12 | 36 |

=== Men ===
| Event | Gold | | Silver | | Bronze | |
|---|---|---|---|---|---|---|
| Recurve individual | Ian Brough (Orkney) | 1179 | Steven Bollen (Isle of Wight) | 1172 | Absalon Hansen (FRO) | 1158 |
| Recurve Head to Head Knockout | Borja Goñalons (Menorca) | | Hans Petur Højgaard (FRO) | | Jan-Åke Andersson (Gotland) | |
| Compound | Jógvan Niclasen (FRO) | 1345 | Albert Elias Dam (FRO) | 1311 | Mikael Lerberg (Gotland) | 1293 |
| Compound Head to Head Knockout | Roger Sandelin (Gotland) | | Mikael Appelqvist (GGY) | | Albert Elias Dam (FRO) | |

=== Women ===
| Event | Gold | | Silver | | Bronze | |
|---|---|---|---|---|---|---|
| Recurve individual | Saana-Maria Sinisalo (ALA) | 1218 | Chantelle Goubert (GGY) | 1168 | Annika Vang (FRO) | 1163 |
| Recurve Head to Head Knockout | Saana-Maria Sinisalo (ALA) | | Chantelle Goubert (GGY) | | Rebekka Gannholm (Gotland) | |
| Compound | Aalin George (IOM) | 1354 | Lucy O'Sullivan (Jersey) | 1343 | Sarah Rigby (IOM) | 1343 |
| Compound Head to Head Knockout | Lucy O'Sullivan (Jersey) | | Aalin George (IOM) | | Sigrid Kristianna Vang (FRO) | |

=== Team ===
| Event | Gold | | Silver | | Bronze | |
|---|---|---|---|---|---|---|
| Recurve | Faroe Islands | 3477 | Guernsey | 3353 | Åland Islands | 3320 |
| Recurve Head to Head Team Knockout | Faroe Islands | | Jersey | | Åland Islands | |
| Compound | Faroe Islands | 3964 | Shetland | 3866 | Jersey | 3806 |
| Compound Head to Head Team Knockout | Guernsey | | Faroe Islands | | Isle of Wight | |
