= Table tennis at the 2011 Island Games =

Table tennis at the 2011 Island Games was held from 26 June–1 July 2011 at the Ryde School.

== Events ==
=== Medal table ===
Rank	Nation	Gold	Silver	Bronze	Total
1	Guernsey	5	1	1	7
2	Gotland	1	1	4	6
3	Jersey	0	2	4	6
4	Isle of Wight	0	1	0	1
4	Shetland	0	1	0	1
6	Faroe Islands	0	0	1	1
6	Åland	0	0	1	1
Totals (7 entries)		6	6	11	23

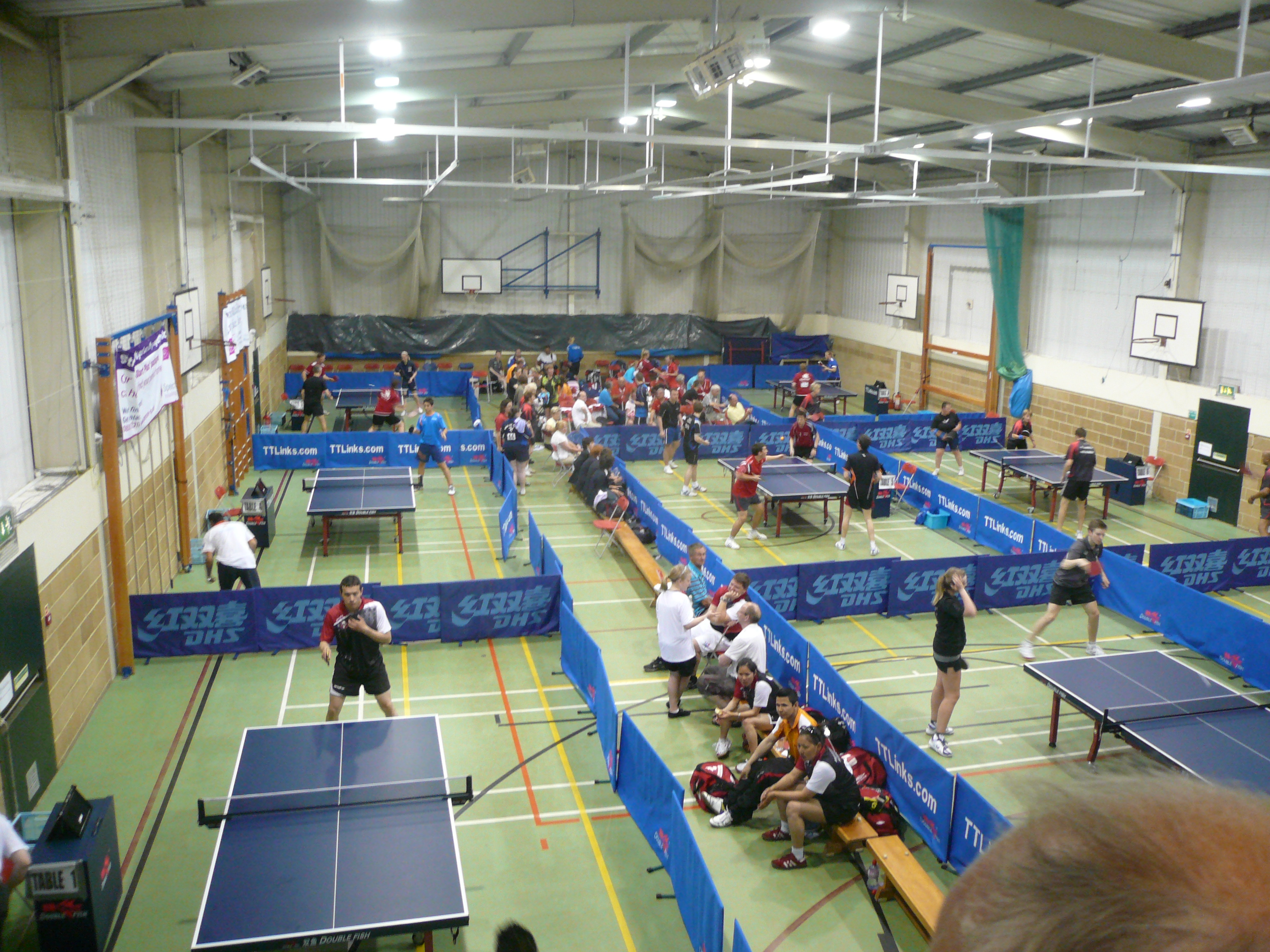
- Island Games 2011 table tennis
  As all events except the Mixed Team bracket had no third place match, two bronze medals were awarded per event.

=== Men ===
Event	Gold	Silver	Bronze
Singles	(Gotland) Nisse Lundberg	(Isle of Wight) George Downing	(Jersey) Craig Gascoyne (Gotland) Jonas Berglund
Doubles	(Guernsey) Garry Dodd / Oliver Langois	(Jersey) Craig Gascoyne / Jakub Wankowicz	(Jersey) Hugo Tupper / Max Tupper (Åland) Jim Bergbo / Johan Pettersson

=== Women ===
Event	Gold	Silver	Bronze
Singles	(Guernsey) Alice Loveridge	(Shetland) Lynda Flaws	(Guernsey) Dawn Morgan (Gotland) Evelina Carlsson
Doubles	(Guernsey) Alice Loveridge / Dawn Morgan	(Jersey) Kay Lefebvre / Kelsey Le Maistre	(Faroe Islands) Rakul Mikkjalsdóttir / Henrietta Nielsen (Gotland) Evelina Carlsson / Elin Schwartz

=== Mixed ===
Event	Gold	Silver	Bronze
Doubles	(Guernsey) Garry Dodd / Alice Loveridge	(Guernsey) Dawn Morgan / Oliver Langois	(Jersey) Craig Gascoyne / Karen Le Febvre (Gotland) Nisse Lundberg / Evelina Carlsson
Team	Guernsey	Gotland	Jersey

== Results ==
=== Team ===
==== Group A ====
Team	Pld	W	L	GW	GL	Pts
Gotland	4	4	0	21	7	8
Menorca	4	3	1	15	12	7
Faroe Islands	4	2	2	16	12	6
Åland	4	1	3	10	17	5
Greenland	4	0	4	7	21	4

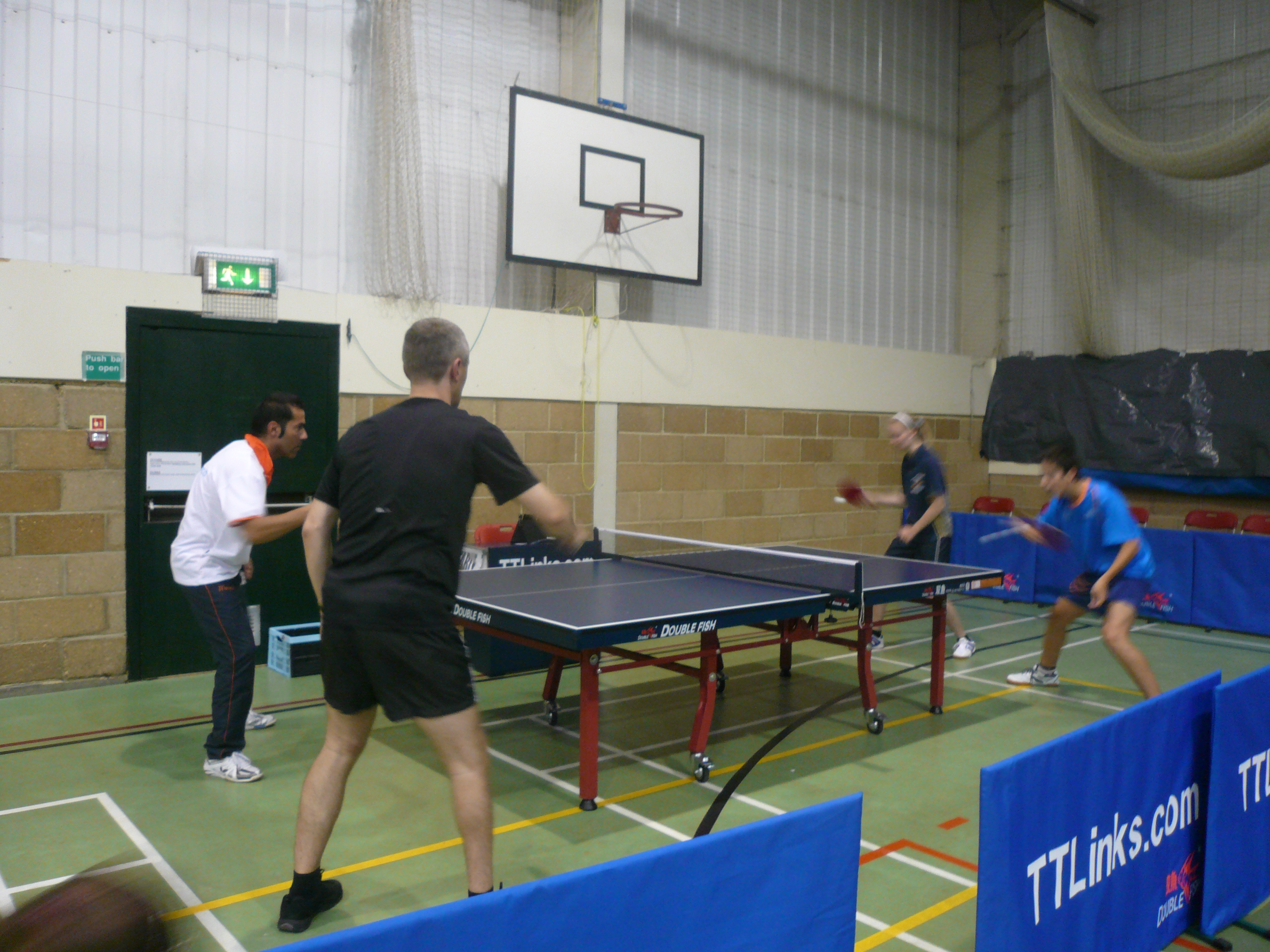
tennis at Ryde School at Island Games 2011

Date		Score		M1	M2	M3	M4	M5	M6	M7
26 Jun	Gotland	6–1	Åland	1–3	3–0	3–0	3–0	3–0	3–0	3–0
26 Jun	Greenland	3–4	Menorca	1–3	1–3	2–3	1–3	3–0	3–0	3–0
26 Jun	Faroe Islands	4–3	Åland	0–3	1–3	1–3	3–0	3–0	3–0	3–1
26 Jun	Gotland	4–3	Menorca	1–3	3–1	1–3	2–3	3–0	3–0	3–1
26 Jun	Gotland	4–3	Faroe Islands	2–3	3–1	0–3	3–1	3–0	3–2	2–3
26 Jun	Greenland	3–4	Åland	1–3	1–3	2–3	0–3	3–0	3–0	3–1
27 Jun	Faroe Islands	3–4	Menorca	2–3	0–3	0–3	2–3	3–0	3–0	3–0
27 Jun	Gotland	7–0	Greenland	3–0	3–2	3–0	3–1	3–1	3–1	3–0
27 Jun	Åland	2–4	Menorca	1–3	3–1	3–0	0–3	0–3	2–3	
27 Jun	Greenland	1–6	Faroe Islands	3–2	1–3	2–3	0–3	0–3	2–3	0–3

==== Group B ====
Team	Pld	W	L	GW	GL	Pts
Guernsey	5	5	0	34	1	10
Jersey	5	4	1	26	9	9
Isle of Wight	5	3	2	20	15	8
Isle of Man	5	2	3	15	20	7
Rhodes	5	1	4	4	30	6
Shetland	5	0	5	5	29	5

Date		Score		M1	M2	M3	M4	M5	M6	M7
26 Jun	Jersey	7–0	Isle of Man	3–1	3–0	3–0	3–0	3–1	3–0	3–0
26 Jun	Guernsey	7–0	Rhodes	3–0	3–0	3–0	3–0	3–0	3–0	3–0
26 Jun	Isle of Wight	6–1	Shetland	3–0	3–0	3–1	3–0	0–3	3–0	3–0
26 Jun	Guernsey	7–0	Shetland	3–0	3–0	3–0	3–0	3–1	3–0	3–0
26 Jun	Isle of Wight	5–2	Isle of Man	3–0	3–0	3–0	3–1	0–3	1–3	3–1
26 Jun	Jersey	7–0	Rhodes	3–0	3–0	3–0	3–0	3–0	3–0	3–0
26 Jun	Jersey	5–2	Isle of Wight	1–3	3–2	3–0	3–0	1–3	3–2	3–1
26 Jun	Guernsey	7–0	Isle of Man	3–0	3–0	3–0	3–0	3–0	3–0	3–1
26 Jun	Rhodes	4–2	Shetland	3–2	3–0	3–0	3–2	0–3	0–3	NP
27 Jun	Isle of Man	6–1	Shetland	3–0	3–0	3–0	3–0	0–3	3–0	3–1
27 Jun	Isle of Wight	7–0	Rhodes	3–0	3–2	3–0	3–1	3–0	3–0	3–0
27 Jun	Jersey	1–6	Guernsey	3–2	0–3	1–3	0–3	1–3	1–3	0–3
27 Jun	Isle of Man	7–0	Rhodes	3–0	3–0	3–0	3–1	3–0	3–0	3–0
27 Jun	Jersey	6–1	Shetland	3–0	3–0	3–0	3–0	2–3	3–0	3–0
27 Jun	Guernsey	7–0	Isle of Wight	3–0	3–0	3–1	3–0	3–0	3–0	3–2

==== Playoff 9–11 ====
Date		Score		M1	M2	M3	M4	M5
27 Jun	Greenland	4–1	Shetland	3–0	3–0	3–0	0–3	3–0

==== Playoffs 5–8 ====
Date		Score		M1	M2	M3	M4	M5	M6	M7
27 Jun	Faroe Islands	4–2	Isle of Man	3–0	3–0	1–3	3–0	1–3	3–0	
27 Jun	Isle of Wight	4–3	Åland	1–3	3–2	0–3	3–0	3–0	3–0	0–3

==== Semifinals ====
Date		Score		M1	M2	M3	M4	M5
27 Jun	Gotland	4–1	Jersey	0–3	3–2	3–1	3–2	3–1
27 Jun	Guernsey	4–0	Menorca	3–0	3–0	3–0	3–0	

==== Ninth place game ====
Date		Score		M1	M2	M3	M4
28 Jun	Greenland	4–0	Rhodes	3–0	3–1	3–0	3–0

==== Seventh place game ====
Date		Score		M1	M2	M3	M4	M5	M6
28 Jun	Åland	2–4	Isle of Man	3–0	3–0	1–3	0–3	0–3	2–3

==== Fifth place game ====
Date		Score		M1	M2	M3	M4
28 Jun	Faroe Islands	4–0	Isle of Wight	3–1	3–2	3–0	3–0

==== Bronze place game ====
Date		Score		M1	M2	M3	M4	M5
28 Jun	Jersey	4–1	Menorca	3–0	2–3	3–1	3–0	3–0

==== Gold place game ====
Date		Score		M1	M2	M3	M4
28 Jun	Gotland	0–4	Guernsey	2–3	0–3	1–3	2–3
