= Archery at the 2015 Island Games =

Archery at the 2015 Island Games was held from 29 June–2 July 2015 at the Jersey Rugby Club in Saint Peter, Jersey.

== Events ==
=== Medal table ===
* Host nation (Jersey)

Rank	Nation	Gold	Silver	Bronze	Total
1	Isle of Wight	3	1	1	5
2	Faroe Islands	3	0	2	5
3	Guernsey	2	3	3	8
4	Jersey*	2	3	0	5
5	Isle of Man	1	1	2	4
6	Menorca	1	0	1	2
7	Falkland Islands	0	1	0	1
7	Gotland	0	1	0	1
7	Orkney	0	1	0	1
7	Rhodes	0	1	0	1
11	Åland	0	0	3	3
Totals (11 entries)		12	12	12	36

== Results ==
=== Men ===
Event	Gold		Silver		Bronze	
Single FITA Recurve	Borja Goñalons Meca (Menorca)	1207	Savvas Kipouros (Rhodes)	1190	Absalon Hansen (FRO)	1190
Single FITA Compound	Lee Grace (IOW)	1344	Stewart Stanger (Orkney)	1340	Kaj Johannesen (FRO)	1339
Recurve Head to Head Knockout	Mark Renouf (JEY)		Mark Lewis (FLK)		Borja Goñalons Meca (Menorca)	
Compound Head to Head Knockout	Jógvan Niclasen (FRO)		Micael Lerberg (Gotland)		Lee Grace (IOW)	

=== Women ===
Event	Gold		Silver		Bronze	
Single FITA Recurve	Chantelle Goubert (GGY)	1192	Karen Vanessa Lott (IOM)	1184	Saana-Maria Sinisalo (ALA)	1171
Single FITA Compound	Aalin Ellisse George (IOM)	1358	Lucy O'Sullivan (JEY)	1350	Gen Witham (GGY)	1342
Recurve Head to Head Knockout	Lisa Gray (GGY)		Chantelle Goubert (GGY)		Saana-Maria Sinisalo (ALA)	
Compound Head to Head Knockout	Lucy O'Sullivan (JEY)		Gen Witham (GGY)		Kirsten Susan George (IOM)	

=== Team ===
Event	Gold		Silver		Bronze	
Single FITA Recurve Team	Isle of Wight; Suzanne Banfield; Steven Bollen; Emma Brown; Stephen Brown; Richard Davidson; Michael Smith	3469	Guernsey; Chantelle Goubert; Lisa Gray; Jason Le Page; Wayne Mckane; Daniel Power; Steve Yates	3426	Åland Islands; Petri Allinen; Emily Grunér; David Johansson; Håkan Lindén; Saana-Maria Sinisalo	3397
Single FITA Compound Team	Faroe Islands; Albert E. Dam; Kaj Johannesen; Anja Johansen; Jógvan Niclasen; Sigrid K. Vang	4004	Isle of Wight; Ann Frankum; Lee Grace; Kevin Houghton; Neil Linnett; Phillip Rackett	3964	Guernsey; Mikael Appelqvist; Mark Falla; Zoe Gray; Michael Marquand; James Nippers; Gen Witham	3928
Recurve Head to Head Team Knockout	Isle of Wight; Suzanne Banfield; Steven Bollen; Emma Brown; Stephen Brown; Richard Davidson; Michael Smith		Jersey; Karen Barnes; Timothy Bridges; Bjarne Jacobsen; Tadhg Macfirbhisigh; Maria Mitchell; Mark Renouf		Guernsey; Chantelle Goubert; Lisa Gray; Jason Le Page; Wayne Mckane; Daniel Power; Steve Yates	
Compound Head to Head Team Knockout	Faroe Islands; Albert E. Dam; Kaj Johannesen; Anja Johansen; Jógvan Niclasen; Sigrid K. Vang		Jersey; Daniel D'Orleans; Cliff Graves; Daryl Mavity; Lucy O'Sullivan; Angela Perrett; Heath Perrett		Isle of Man; Aalin Ellisse George; Kirsten Susan George; William James Lightfoot; David William Moore; Peter Mumford	
