= Alex Clark (squash player) =

Scottish squash player (born 1987)

Personal information
- Nationality: British
- Born: 17 April 1987 (age 39) Portsmouth, England
- Education: Heriot Watt University

Sport
- Handedness: right handed
- Coached by: Roger Flynn
- Racquet used: Harrow
- Highest ranking: 95 (February 2012)

Alex Clark (born 17 April 1987) is a former squash player who represented Scotland at the Commonwealth Games.

== Biography ==
Clark graduated at the University of Birmingham.

Clark represented the Scottish team at the 2014 Commonwealth Games held in her home nation, Scotland. She competed in the women's doubles with Frania Gillen-Buchert and the mixed doubles with Kevin Moran. She

In 2014, she was a squash coach at the Cynwyd Club.
