= Basketball at the 2011 Island Games =

Basketball at the 2011 Island Games was held from 26 June–1 July 2011 at the Medina Leisure Centre for men and at the Cowes High School for the women's tournament.

== Events ==
=== Medal table ===
Rank	Nation	Gold	Silver	Bronze	Total
1	Bermuda	1	0	0	1
1	Menorca	1	0	0	1
3	Gibraltar	0	1	0	1
3	Saare County	0	1	0	1
5	Guernsey	0	0	1	1
5	Rhodes	0	0	1	1
Totals (6 entries)		2	2	2	6

=== Medal summary ===
Event	Gold	Silver	Bronze
Men	Bermuda	Saare County	Rhodes
Women	Menorca	Gibraltar	Guernsey
