= Archery at the 2017 Island Games =

- Dates: June 24 – 30
- Host city: Gotland, Sweden
- Venue: Rävhagen, Visby
- Level: Senior

Archery, for the 2017 Island Games, held at the Rävhagen, Visby, Gotland, Sweden in June 2017.

The Isle of Man have confirmed they will be providing a squad of 9 in two teams.

== Medal table ==
* Host nation (Gotland)

Rank	Nation	Gold	Silver	Bronze	Total
1	Faroe Islands (FRO)	7	1	6	14
2	Guernsey (GUE)	3	8	2	13
3	Gotland*	1	2	1	4
4	Åland	1	1	1	3
5	Menorca	1	1	0	2
6	Jersey (JEY)	1	0	2	3
7	Bermuda (BER)	0	1	0	1
8	Falkland Islands (FLK)	0	0	1	1
8	Isle of Man (IOM)	0	0	1	1
Totals (9 entries)		14	14	14	42

== Results ==
=== Men's ===
Event	Gold		Silver		Bronze	
Single recurve	Oddmar Nielsen (FRO)	1144	Jason Le Page (GGY)	1129	Absalon Sandy Harryson Hansen (FRO)	1124
Recurve knockout	Borja Goñalons Meca (Minorca)		Absalon Sandy Harryson Hansen (FRO)		Oddmar Nielsen (FRO)	
Single compound	Roger Sandelin (Gotland)	1317	Micael Lerberg (Gotland)	1306	Jógvan Niclasen (FRO)	1294
Compound knockout	Albert Elias Dam (FRO)		Roger Sandelin (Gotland)		Nikkel Petersen (FRO)	

=== Women's ===
Event	Gold		Silver		Bronze	
Single recurve	Lisa Gray (GGY)	1234	Chantelle Goubert (GGY)	1116	Saana-Maria Sinisalo (ALA)	1114
Recurve knockout	Saana-Maria Sinisalo (ALA)		Lisa Gray (GGY)		Chantelle Goubert (GGY)	
Single compound	Anja Eydnudóttir (FRO)	1317	Gen Witham (GGY)	1295	Zoe Gray (GGY)	1263
Compound knockout	Anja Eydnudóttir (FRO)		Zoe Gray (GGY)		Angela Perrett (JEY)	

=== Team ===
Event	Gold		Silver		Bronze	
Single recurve	Guernsey; Jason Clarke; Fiona Falla; Chantele Goubert; Lisa Gray; Jason Le Page; Wayne McKane; Paul Taylor	3359	Åland Islands; Petri Allinen; Emily Grunér; David Johansson; Håkan Lindén; Caterina Mavilia; Daniele Rolfi; Saana-Maria Sinisalo	3326	Faroe Islands; Absalon Sandy Harryson Hansen; Jastrid Mathea Rein Jensen; Oddmar Nielsen	3189
Recurve knockout	Jersey; Paul Bredonchel; Ian Hamon; Tadhg Macfirbhisgh; Maria Mitchell; Tamara Mitchell; Mark Renouf; Sandra Robinson; Jill Ruby		Menorca; Antonio Jose Goñalons Gomila; Borja Goñalons Meca; Nuria Mercadal Marques; Angel Millet Ortega		Faroe Islands; Absalon Sandy Harryson Hansen; Jastrid Mathea Rein Jensen; Oddmar Nielsen	
Single compound	Faroe Islands; Albert Elias Dam; Anja Eydnudóttir; Jógvan Niclasen; Nikkel Petersen; Jóannes Poulsen	3901	Guernsey; Mikael Appelqvist; Zoe Gray; Kieran Kelly; Laura Le Page; Michael Marquand; James Nippers; Gen Witham	3864	Gotland; Petra Gudinge; Kenneth Jensen; Micael Lerberg; Roger Sandelin; Stefan Stenegäd	3813
Compound knockout	Faroe Islands; Albert Elias Dam; Anja Eydnudóttir; Jógvan Niclasen; Nikkel Petersen; Jóannes Poulsen		Guernsey; Mikael Appelqvist; Zoe Gray; Kieran Kelly; Laura Le Page; Michael Marquand; James Nippers; Gen Witham		Isle of Man; Joy Gough; William James Lightfoot; David William Moore; Ethan Moore; Rhys Moore	

=== Mixed ===
Event	Gold	Silver	Bronze
Recurve knockout	Guernsey; Jason Clarke; Fiona Falla; Chantelle Goubert; Lisa Gray; Jason Le Page; Wayne McKane; Paul Taylor	Bermuda; Robert O'Connor; Tiffany Slaton; Bernard Wade III	Falkland Islands; Melanie Gilding; Javier Lazo
Compound knockout	Faroe Islands; Albert Elias Dam; Anja Eydnudóttir; Jógvan Niclasen; Nikkel Petersen; Jóannes Poulsen	Guernsey; Mikael Appelqvist; Zoe Gray; Kieran Kelly; Laura Le Page; Michael Marquand; James Nippers; Gen Witham	Jersey; Matthew Dale; Karen Macfirbhisigh; Melissa Mahe; Angela Perrett; Heath Perrett; Francisco Rocha
