= Table tennis at the 2015 Island Games =

Table Tennis at the 2015 Island Games was held at the Geoff Reed Table Tennis Centre, Jersey from 28 June to 3 July.

== Medal table ==
* Host nation (Jersey)

Rank	Nation	Gold	Silver	Bronze	Total
1	Guernsey	3	1	0	4
2	Gotland	2	1	4	7
3	Åland	1	1	1	3
4	Jersey*	0	2	1	3
5	Faroe Islands	0	1	0	1
Totals (5 entries)		6	6	6	18

== Results ==
Event	Gold	Silver	Bronze
Men’s singles	Nisse Lundberg (Gotland)	Jordan Wykes (JEY)	Björn Axelsson (Gotland)
Women’s singles	Alice Loveridge (GGY)	Marina Donner (ALA)	Sofia Uddnas (JEY)
Men’s doubles	Gotland; Björn Axelsson; Nisse Lundberg	Jersey; Joshua Band; Jordan Wykes	Gotland; Jonas Berglund; Johan Eriksson
Women's doubles	Guernsey; Alice Loveridge; Dawn Morgan	Faroe Islands; Durita Fríðadóttir Jensen; Henrietta Nielsen	Gotland; Evelina Carlsson; Elin Schwartz
Mixed doubles	Åland Islands; Marina Donner; Johan Pettersson	Guernsey; Garry Dodd; Alice Loveridge	Gotland; Jonas Berglund; Lina Olofsson
Team	Guernsey; Joshua Butler; Garry Dodd; Samantha Kershaw; Alice Loveridge; Dawn Morgan; Elizabeth Priest; Alex Robinson; Joshua Stacey	Gotland; Björn Axelsson; Jonas Berglund; Evelina Carlsson; Johan Eriksson; Nisse Lundberg; Alice Nilsson; Lina Olofsson; Elin Schwartz	Åland Islands; Jim Bergbo; Marina Donner; Harry Lindqvist; Johan Pettersson; Lucas Stenius
