= Squash at the 2019 Island Games =

- Venue: Europa Sports Complex – Squash Centre
- Dates: 7–12 July

Squash, for the 2019 Island Games held at the Europa Sports Complex – Squash Centre, Gibraltar in July 2019.

== Medal table ==
* Host nation (Gibraltar)

Rank	Nation	Gold	Silver	Bronze	Total
1	Cayman Islands	6	0	0	6
2	Guernsey	0	3	2	5
3	Jersey	0	1	1	2
4	Gibraltar*	0	1	0	1
4	Isle of Man	0	1	0	1
6	Isle of Wight	0	0	2	2
7	Bermuda	0	0	1	1
Totals (7 entries)		6	6	6	18

== Results ==
Event	Gold	Silver	Bronze
Men's singles	Cameron Stafford; Cayman Islands	David Norman; Isle of Man	Janick Radford; Guernsey
Women's singles	Marlene West; Cayman Islands	Natalie Dodd; Guernsey	Amelie Haworth; Isle of Wight
Men's doubles	Cayman Islands; Julian Jervis; Jake Kelly	Gibraltar; Anthony Brindle; Christian Navas	Jersey; Scott Gautier; Anthony Harkin
Women's doubles	Cayman Islands; Eilidh Bridgeman; Jade Pitcairn	Guernsey; Natalie Dodd; Karen Robinson	Isle of Wight; Fleur England; Amelie Haworth
Mixed doubles	Cayman Islands; Cameron Stafford; Marlene West	Guernsey; Natalie Dodd; Laurence Graham	Bermuda; Rachel Barnes; Anthony Fellowes
Team	Cayman Islands; Eilidh Bridgeman; Laura Conolly; Julian Jervis; Jake Kelly; Daniel Murphy; Jade Pitcairn; Cameron Stafford; Marlene West	Jersey; Beth Garton; Scott Gautier; Charlie Griggs; Anthony Harkin; James Lewis; Sophie Pallot; Amelie Turpin; Susan Turpin	Guernsey; Henry Birch; Natalie Dodd; Laurence Graham; Mark Le Conte; Janick Radford; Karen Robinson
