= Volleyball at the 2011 Island Games =

Volleyball at the 2011 Island Games was held from 26 June–1 July 2011 at the Fairway Sports Complex and Rew Valley Sports Centre.

== Events ==
=== Medal table ===
Rank	Nation	Gold	Silver	Bronze	Total
1	Saare County	2	0	0	2
2	Faroe Islands (FRO)	0	2	0	2
3	Menorca	0	0	1	1
3	Åland (ALA)	0	0	1	1
Totals (4 entries)		2	2	2	6

=== Summary ===
Event	Gold	Silver	Bronze
Men	Saare County	Faroe Islands	Åland
Women	Saare County	Faroe Islands	Menorca
