= Squash at the 2013 Island Games =

Squash, for the 2013 Island Games, took place at the Bermuda Squash Racquets Association in Devonshire Parish, Bermuda. The competition took place from 14 to 19 July 2013.

== Medal table ==
- Bermuda 2013 Squash Medal Tally

* Host nation (Bermuda)

| Rank | Nation | Gold | Silver | Bronze | Total |
|---|---|---|---|---|---|
| 1 | Cayman Islands (CAY) | 4 | 0 | 0 | 4 |
| 2 | Jersey (JEY) | 2 | 3 | 1 | 6 |
| 3 | Bermuda (BER)* | 0 | 1 | 2 | 3 |
| 4 | Guernsey (GGY) | 0 | 1 | 1 | 2 |
| 4 | Shetland (SHE) | 0 | 1 | 1 | 2 |
| 6 | Gibraltar (GIB) | 0 | 0 | 1 | 1 |
| Totals (6 entries) | | 6 | 6 | 6 | 18 |

== Medal summary of events ==
| Event | Gold | Silver | Bronze |
|---|---|---|---|
| Men's singles | Nick Taylor (Jersey) | Michael Hopkins (Jersey) | Micah Franklin (BER) |
| Women's singles | Sarah Taylor (Jersey) | Joan Smith (Shetland Islands) | Laura Joanne Robinson (BER) |
| Men's doubles | Cayman Islands; Mark Chaloner; Cameron Stafford | Jersey; Michael Hopkins; Scott Gautier | Gibraltar; Anthony Brindle; Adam Newnham |
| Women's doubles | Cayman Islands; Jaclyn Geils; Marlene West | Guernsey; Natalie Dodd; Katherine Jensen | Shetland; Kerry Pottinger; Joan Smith |
| Mixed doubles | Cayman Islands; Mark Chaloner; Marlene West | Jersey; Nick Taylor; Sarah Taylor | Guernsey; Laurence Graham; Natalie Dodd |
| Team | Cayman Islands | Bermuda | Jersey |
