= Squash at the 2011 Island Games =

Squash at the 2011 Island Games was held from 26 June–1 July 2011 at the Westridge Squash & Tone Zone.

== Events ==
=== Medal table ===
Rank	Nation	Gold	Silver	Bronze	Total
1	Jersey (JEY)	5	1	1	7
2	Cayman Islands (CAY)	1	2	2	5
3	Isle of Wight (IOW)	0	2	0	2
4	Guernsey (GGY)	0	1	2	3
5	Gibraltar (GIB)	0	0	1	1
Totals (5 entries)		6	6	6	18

=== Men ===
Event	Gold	Silver	Bronze
Singles	Nick Taylor (Jersey)	Alex Phillips (Isle of Wight)	Michael Hopkins (Jersey)
Doubles	Jersey; Michael Hopkins; Mark Le Roux	Cayman Islands; Gabriel Rabess; Cameron Stafford	Gibraltar; Anthony Brindle; Adam Newnham

=== Women ===
Event	Gold	Silver	Bronze
Singles	Caroline Heal (CAY)	Sarah Taylor (Jersey)	Isabella Norman-Ross (GGY)
Doubles	Jersey; Kate Cadigan; Sarah Taylor	Guernsey; Gemma Coquelin; Natalie Dodd	Cayman Islands; Chantelle Day; Jaclyn Ridgway

=== Mixed ===
Event	Gold	Silver	Bronze
Doubles	Jersey; Sarah Taylor; Nick Taylor	Cayman Islands; Malton Blair; Mariene West	Guernsey; Ben Rosec; Isabella Norman-Ross
Team	Jersey	Isle of Wight	Cayman Islands

== Results ==
=== Team ===
==== Group A ====
Team	GP	W	L	GF	GA
Jersey	3	3	0	15	0
Isle of Wight	3	2	1	9	6
Shetland Islands	3	1	2	4	11
Bermuda	3	0	3	2	13

Date		Score		M1	M2	M3	M4	M5
26 June	Jersey	5–0	Shetland	3–0	3–0	3–0	3–0	3–0
26 June	Isle of Wight	5–0	Bermuda	3–0	3–0	3–0	3–0	3–0
26 June	Jersey	5–0	Isle of Wight	3–0	3–0	3–1	3–0	3–0
26 June	Shetland Islands	3–2	Bermuda	0–3	0–3	3–0	3–0	3–0
26 June	Isle of Wight	4–1	Shetland	3–0	3–0	3–1	1–3	3–0
26 June	Jersey	5–0	Bermuda	3–0	3–2	3–0	3–0	3–0

==== Group B ====
Team	GP	W	L	GF	GA
Cayman Islands	3	3	0	11	4
Guernsey	3	1	1	10	5
Gibraltar	2	1	2	6	9
Isle of Man	3	0	3	3	12

Date		Score		M1	M2	M3	M4	M5
26 June	Guernsey	5–0	Isle of Man	3–1	3–0	3–1	3–0	3–0
26 June	Cayman Islands	3–2	Isle of Man	3–0	1–3	0–3	3–0	3–0
26 June	Guernsey	1–4	Cayman Islands	3–0	1–3	0–3	0–3	0–3
26 June	Isle of Man	2–3	Gibraltar	0–3	3–2	0–3	1–3	3–0
26 June	Isle of Man	1–4	Cayman Islands	0–3	0–3	3–2	0–3	0–3
26 June	Guernsey	4–1	Gibraltar	3–1	3–2	0–3	3–0	3–0

==== 5th–8th place semifinals ====
Date		Score		M1	M2	M3	M4	M5
27 June	Shetland Islands	2–3	Isle of Man	0–3	0–3	0–3	3–0	3–2
27 June	Gibraltar	3–2	Bermuda	3–0	3–1	3–0	0–3	0–3

==== Semifinals ====
Date		Score		M1	M2	M3	M4	M5
27 June	Jersey	5–0	Guernsey	3–0	3–0	3–1	3–1	3–0
27 June	Cayman Islands	2–3	Isle of Wight	2–3	0–3	0–3	3–0	3–0

==== Seventh place game ====
Date		Score		M1	M2	M3	M4	M5
27 June	Bermuda	3–2	Shetland	3–0	3–0	0–3	3–1	0–3

==== Fifth place game ====
Date		Score		M1	M2	M3	M4	M5
27 June	Gibraltar	3–2	Isle of Man	3–0	3–0	3–0	2–3	0–3

==== Bronze medal game ====
Date		Score		M1	M2	M3	M4	M5
27 June	Guernsey	1–3	Cayman Islands	1–3	3–2	0–3	0–3	

==== Gold medal game ====
Date		Score		M1	M2	M3	M4	M5
27 June	Jersey	3–1	Isle of Wight	3–0	2–3	3–0	3–0	
