= Safina Madhani =

Kenyan squash player

Personal information
- Born: 3 April 1984 (age 42) Nairobi, Kenya

Sport
- Country: Kenya
- Handedness: Squash

Safina Madhani (born 3 April 1984) is a Kenyan female squash player. She has represented Kenya at several international squash competitions including the 2010 Commonwealth Games and 2014 Commonwealth Games. She was one of the fewest women squash players to have represented Kenya at the Commonwealth Games as Kenya sent a delegation of squash women players for the first time at the 2010 Commonwealth Games which was held in New Delhi, India.

Safina also won the 2008 women's singles squash at the Golden Jubilee Games, a global Ismaili Sports Festival which was held in Nairobi.
