= Deon Saffery =

Welsh squash player (born 1988)

Personal information
- Born: 28 January 1988 (age 38) Barry, Wales

Sport
- Country: Wales
- Handedness: Right
- Coached by: Malcolm Willstrop

Women's singles
- Highest ranking: 42 (March 2015)
- Title: 2
- Tour final: 8
Medal record
Women's squash
Representing Wales
European Team Championships
Bronze medal – third place	2017 Helsinki	Team
Welsh Championships
Gold medal – first place	2008, 2010, 2012, 2014	singles

Deon Saffery (born 28 January 1988) is a former squash player who represented England as a junior and Wales as a senior at two Commonwealth Games. She reached a career-high PSA World ranking of No. 42 in March 2015 and is a four-time Welsh national champion.

== Biography ==
Saffery represented the Welsh team at the 2014 Commonwealth Games in Glasgow, Scotland in the women's singles, the women's doubles and mixed doubles. Partnering Tesni Evans the pair reached the quarter-finals in the doubles.

Saffery competed at the 2018 Commonwealth Games in Gold Coast, Australia, her second consecutive Commonwealth Games appearance, and once again reached the quarter-final of the women's doubles with Tesni Evans. She retired from competitive squash after the 2018 games.

Saffery was a four-time Welsh national champion in 2008, 2010, 2012 and 2014.
