= Madina Zafar =

Pakistani squash player (born 1998)

Personal information
- Born: 10 August 1998 (age 27) Gujranwala, Pakistan
- Height: 158 cm (5 ft 2 in)
- Weight: 56 kg (123 lb)

Sport
- Country: Pakistan
- Retired: active

women's singles
- Highest ranking: 75 (February 2019)
- Current ranking: 155 (June 2018)
Medal record
Women's squash
Representing Pakistan
South Asian Games
Silver medal – second place	2019 Nepal	Team
Bronze medal – third place	2019 Nepal	Singles

Madina Zafar (born 10 August 1998) is a Pakistani professional squash player. As of August 2018, she is ranked 97 in the world, her career-high PSA world ranking. Her elder sister Faiza Zafar is also a fellow squash player who represents Pakistan internationally.

== Career ==
Zafar was selected to represent Pakistan at the 2018 Commonwealth Games along with her sister where both of them made their Commonwealth Games debut appearances. Madina partnered Faiza in the women's doubles event during the 2018 Commonwealth Games where the duo was eliminated in the group stage.

Zafar took part in the 2018 PSF Pakistan Squash Circuit I event as a part of 2018 PSA World Tour and emerged as runner-up to her sister, Faiza.
