= Faiza Zafar =

Pakistani squash player (born 1996)

Personal information
- Born: March 4, 1996 (age 30) Sialkot, Pakistan
- Height: 158 cm (5 ft 2 in)
- Weight: 65 kg (143 lb)

Sport
- Country: Pakistan
- Handedness: Right Handed
- Turned pro: 2017
- Retired: Active

Women's singles
- Highest ranking: No. 78 (November 2018)
- Current ranking: No. 102 (December 2020)
Medal record
Women's squash
Representing Pakistan
South Asian Games
Silver medal – second place	2019 Nepal	Team
Bronze medal – third place	2019 Nepal	Singles
- Updated on December 2020

Faiza Zafar (born 4 March 1996 in Sialkot) is a Pakistani professional squash player. As of February 2018, she was ranked number 174 in the world. She made her Commonwealth Games debut for Pakistan at the 2018 Commonwealth Games. She won the 2018 PSF Pakistan Squash Circuit I professional PSA World Tour tournament. Her younger sister Madina Zafar is also a fellow squash player who competes for Pakistan at the international level.

== Career ==
She made her maiden Commonwealth Games appearance at the 2018 Commonwealth Games along with her sister Madina Zafar. Faiza partnered Madina Zafar in the women's doubles event during the 2018 Commonwealth Games and were eliminated from the group stage.

Faiza Zafar took part in the 2018 PSF Pakistan Squash Circuit I event as a part of 2018 PSA World Tour and emerged as champion by defeating her sister Madina Zafar in the final.
