= Jonathan Dunnett =

British-Spanish adventurer, writer and windsurfing instructor

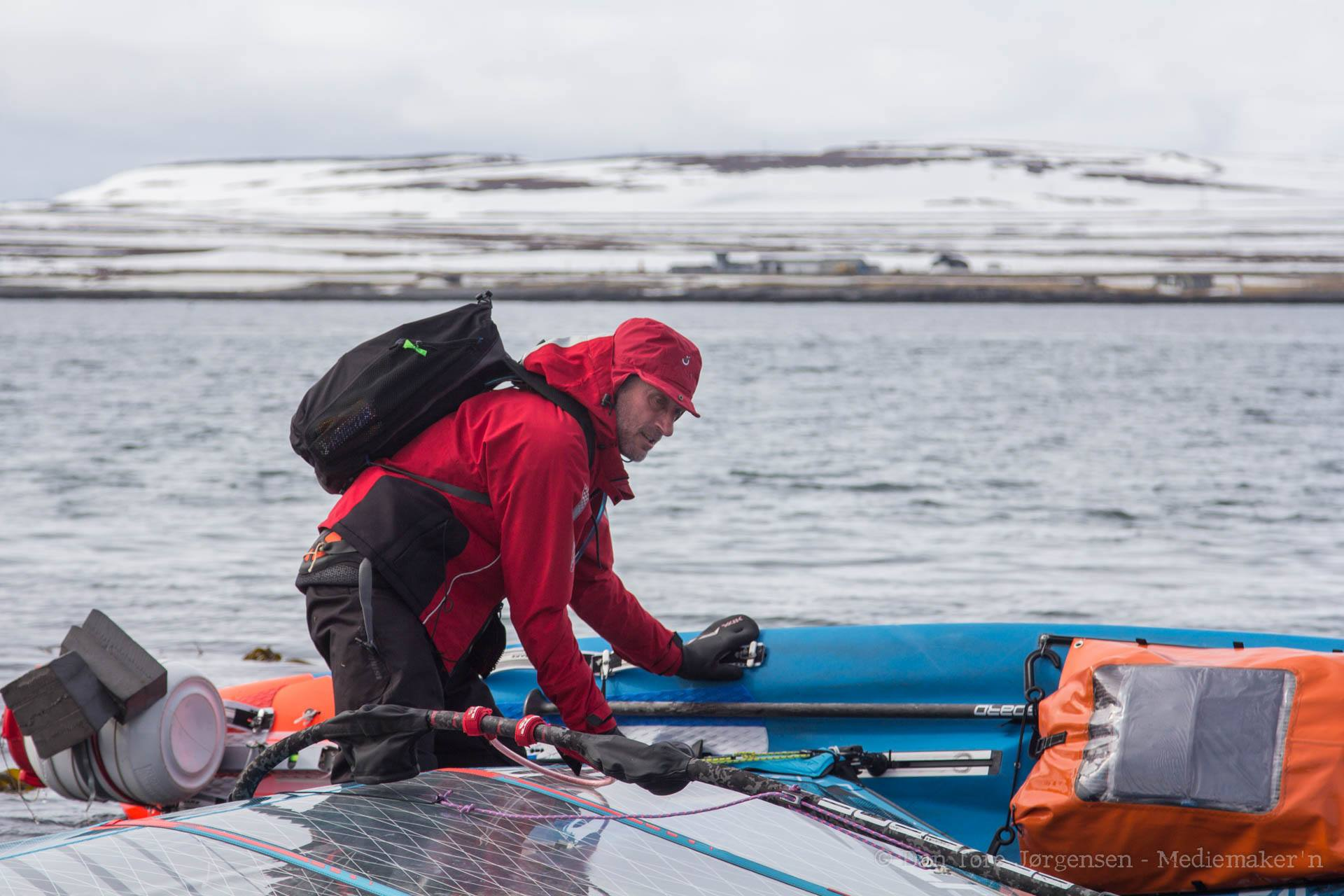
Jonathan Dunnett during his expedition Windsurf Round Europe

Jonathan "Jono" Dunnett (born 11 March 1974) is a British-born Spanish-based adventurer, writer and windsurfing instructor. In May 2019, he completed a solo expedition to windsurf the European mainland coastline on a windsurfer, landing at Batumi, Georgia.

== Biography ==
Jonathan Dunnett was born in London, England, on 11 March 1974. He learned to sail in a Topper dinghy at Clacton-on-Sea, where his family spent weekends. He learned to windsurf at age 10 and competed in Raceboard class from age 15. His brother is novelist Gregg Dunnett.

He is a graduate of Swansea University where he read Biology and Psychology as a Joint honours degree.

From 1997 to 2012 he worked as a sailing instructor on the Spanish island of Menorca, where he maintains a base. In 1998 he completed, with safety boat support, what is assumed to be the first single-day round Menroca windsurf. He represented Menorca at the Natwest Island Games, taking gold for the island three times (Rhodes 2007 - RS:X class, Åland 2009 - Raceboard class, and Isle of Wight 2011 - slalom).

== Windsurf Round Britain ==
In 2015 he achieved his childhood ambition to windsurf round Britain, becoming the fourth person to complete the circumnavigation this way, and the first to complete it alone without support. The expedition started and ended at Clacton-on-Sea. He carried gear in a waterproof barrel on the back of the sailboard (and also a small backpack). He frequently used the sail as a shelter at night. The expedition included the following crossings: North Devon to South Wales via Lundy Island; South Wales to southern Ireland; and Northern Ireland to Scotland.

In 2017 he published his expedition account, "Long Standing Ambition: the first solo round Britain windsurf" that Amazon selected as a finalist for their 2017 Storyteller Award.

In 2023 he published a Spanish translation of Long Standing Ambition under the title "La vuelta a mi isla: La primera circunnavegación en solitario de Gran Bretaña en windsurf".

== Windsurf Round Europe ==
On 20 May 2017 he set sail from Grense Jakobselv, next to the border of Norway and Russia, at latitude 69 North in the Barents Sea, in an attempt to windsurf the mainland coastline of Europe. The expedition goal was to reach the European border with Russia in the Black Sea, though the political situation in the Black Sea would frustrate that goal. In early 2018, a severe case of flu and difficult winter sailing conditions on the Cantabrian Sea forced him to take a two-month break in Menorca. He resumed the expedition in March 2018.

Dunnett completed the continuous windsurfing expedition in Batumi, Georgia, in May 2019. He then took a ferry ride to Odesa in Ukraine, from where he sailed his windsurfer to Burgas, Bulgaria, arriving on 10 June 2019. This was the end of the uninterrupted windsurf voyage part of the journey. By that time, Dunnett had sailed approximately 15,000 km in 2 years and 21 days. This was later recognised as a Guinness record for Longest Windsurfing Journey. From Odesa, Dunnett sailed the Black Sea coastline westward and crossed Danube delta into Romania, and then to Burgas in Bulgaria.

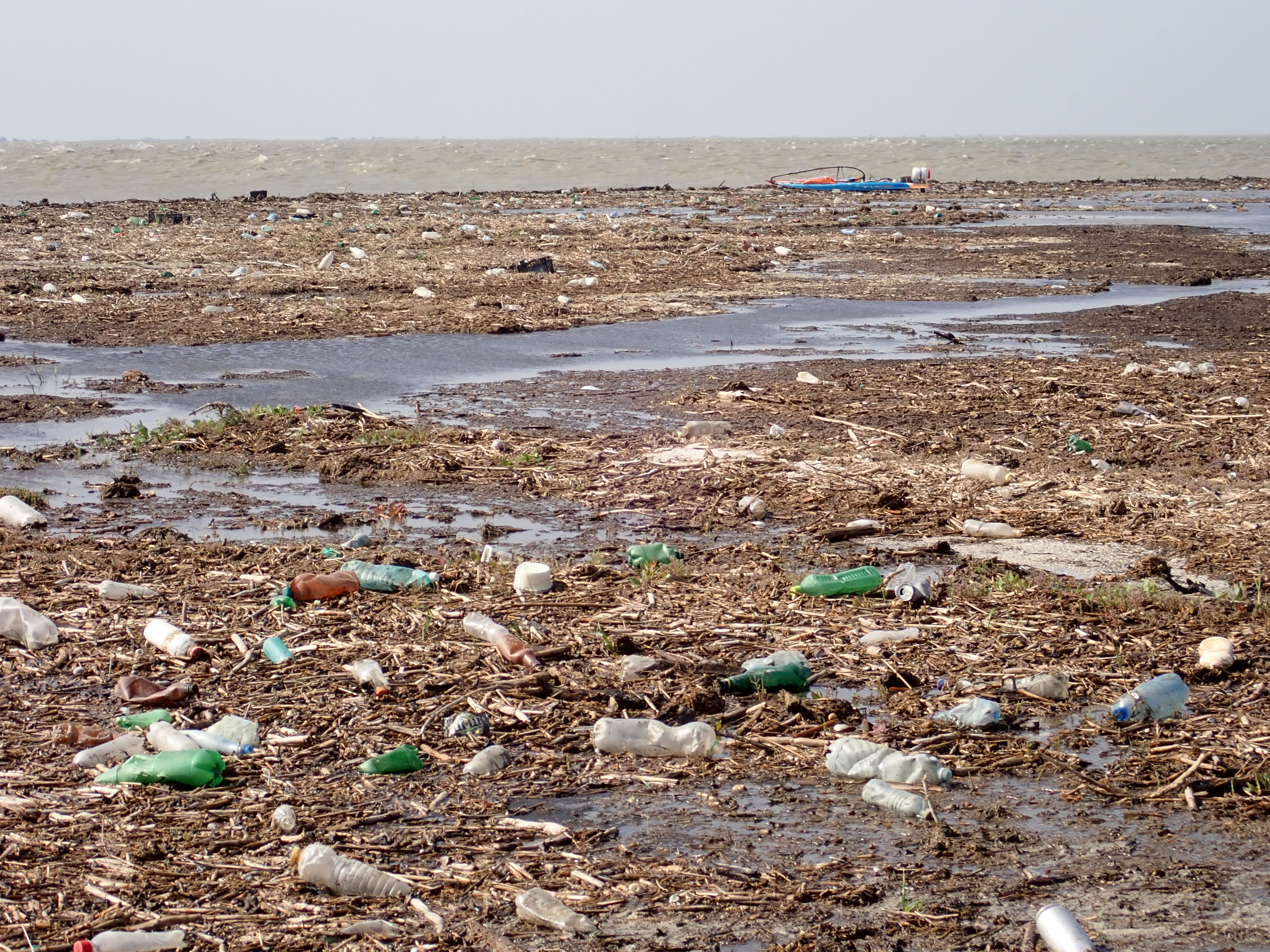
Europe journey: Plastic pollution where the Danube meets the Black Sea

From Burgas, Dunnett rode a tour bicycle with a trailer, all the way north, back to the starting point of the journey. He reached Grense Jakobselv on 30 September 2019, 863 days after he started the journey.

On this solo expedition without a support team, Dunnett carried all supplies and gear on the sailboard. His emergency equipment included EPIRB, handheld VHF radio, cellular phone, waterproof headlamp, dried food, and water.

Dunnett's expedition goals beyond the personal challenge were "to get to know my continent as a logical next step after getting to know my island (Britain)," and to raise awareness for environmental and sustainability issues. The expedition, by its route and mode of travel, provided access to many hard-to-reach coasts and allows Dunnett to observe the status of the waters and shores, which he reported on his website and on social networks.

Dunnett used his expedition website to raise funds for World Wide Fund for Nature (WWF).

== Books ==
- Long Standing Ambition: the first solo round Britain windsurf
- La vuelta a mi isla: La primera circunnavegación en solitario de Gran Bretaña en windsurf (translation of Long Standing Ambition)
- In The Balance: A 15,000 km Voyage of the Seas of Europe

== See also ==
- List of circumnavigations#Non-global
