= Khaaliqa Nimji =

Kenyan squash player

Personal information
- Born: 13 March 1998 (age 28) Nairobi, Kenya

Sport
- Country: Kenya
- Handedness: Squash
- Coached by: Mordecai Kabamba

Khaaliqa Nimji (born 13 March 1998) is a Kenyan female squash player. She has represented Kenya at the 2010 Commonwealth Games, 2014 Commonwealth Games, 2018 Commonwealth Games and 2022 Commonwealth Games. She was one of the few women squash players to represent Kenya at the Commonwealth Games as Kenya sent a delegation of squash women players for the first time at the 2010 Commonwealth Games which was held in New Delhi, India.

== Biography ==
Khaaliqa Nimji was born in Nairobi on 13 March 1998 to Sadri Nimji (father) and Salima Nimji (mother). Khaaliqa started playing squash when she was just two years old with the help of her father. She educated at the Peponi School.

Khaaliqa is the youngest Kenyan to have represented Kenya at multi-sport event at the age of twelve in the 2010 Commonwealth Games. Aged 12, she was also the youngest competitor during the 2010 Commonwealth Games. Prior to the 2010 Commonwealth Games, she was not granted the permission to compete at the multi-sport event which was held in New Delhi because she was regarded as too young by the Kenyan squash chairman at the time. With time, she was eventually allowed to travel.
