= Christine Nunn =

Australian squash player (born 1991)

Personal information
- Born: 4 April 1991 (age 35) Canberra, Australia

Sport
- Country: Australia
- Handedness: Right Handed
- Turned pro: 2008
- Coached by: Sarah Fitz-Gerald
- Retired: Active
- Racquet used: Dunlop

Women's singles
- Highest ranking: No. 36 (July 2016)
- Current ranking: No. 46 (January 2018)
Medal record
Women's squash
Representing Australia
World Doubles Championships
Gold medal – first place	2019 Carrara	Doubles
Silver medal – second place	2019 Carrara	Mixed doubles
- Updated on 13 April 2022

Christine Nunn (born 4 April 1991 in Canberra) is an Australian squash player. She reached a career-high world ranking of World No. 36 in July 2016.
