= Amanda Landers-Murphy =

New Zealand squash player (born 1991)

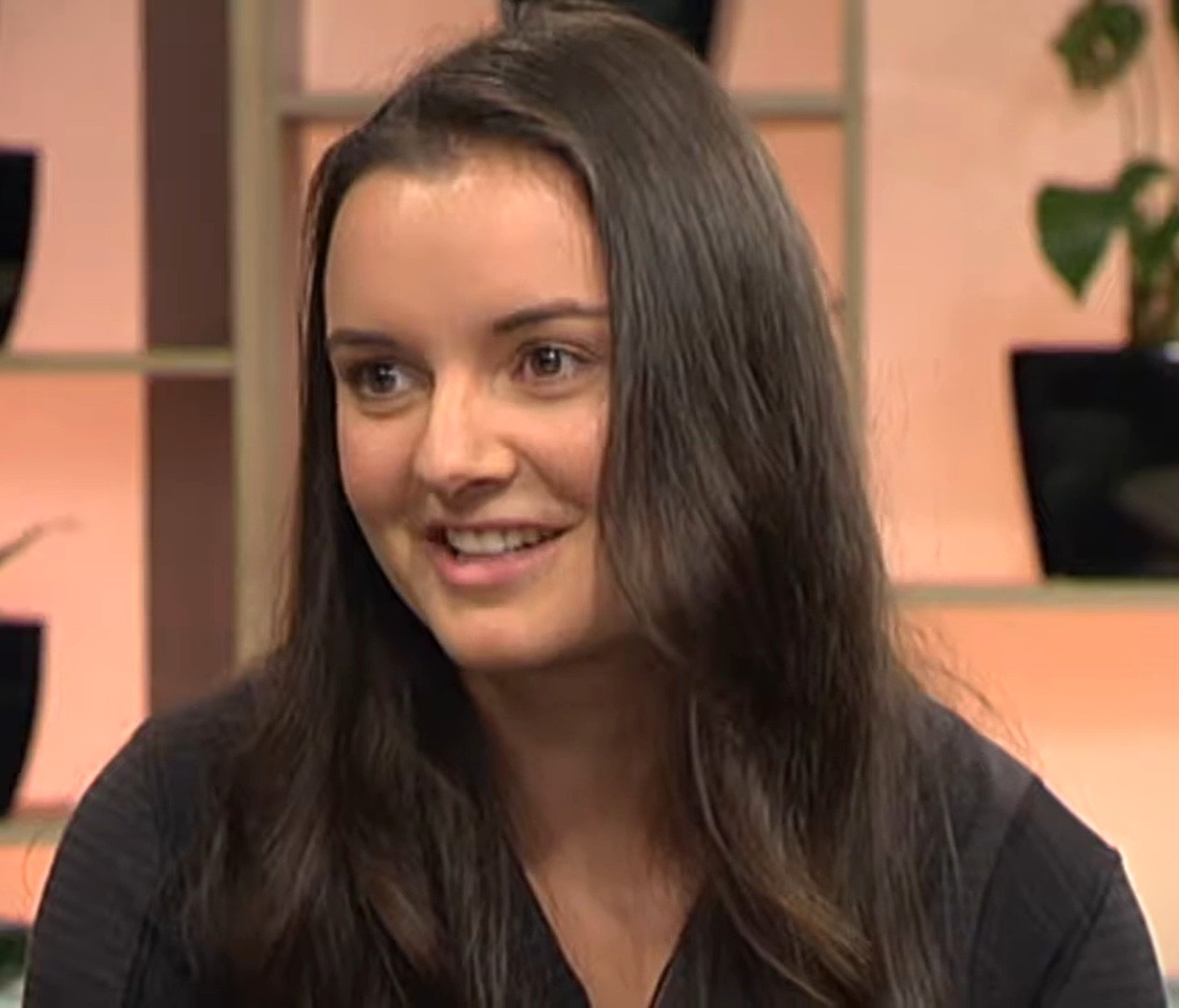
- Landers-Murphy in 2018

Personal information
- Born: 7 June 1991 (age 35) Rotorua, New Zealand
- Height: 1.69 m (5 ft 7 in)

Sport
- Country: New Zealand
- Handedness: Left-handed
- Turned pro: 2008
- Coached by: Danny McQueen
- Retired: Active
- Racquet used: Harrow

Women's singles
- Highest ranking: No. 35 (February 2013)
- Current ranking: No. 39 (January 2016)
- Title: 3
- Tour final: 8
Medal record
Women's squash
Representing New Zealand
World Doubles Championships
Gold medal – first place	2016 Darwin	Doubles
Gold medal – first place	2017 Manchester	Doubles
Commonwealth Games
Gold medal – first place	2018 Gold Coast	Doubles
Gold medal – first place	2022 Birmingham	Doubles
- Updated on 13 April 2022

Amanda Landers-Murphy (born 7 June 1991 in Rotorua) is a New Zealand professional squash player. She reached a career-high world ranking of world No. 35 in February 2013. Of Māori descent, Landers-Murphy affiliates to Te Āti Awa. The two-time world doubles champion and 2018 Commonwealth Games gold medallist made the decision to retire from professional squash in 2018 but her doubles partner, Joelle King, persuaded her to come out of retirement. She won the 2021 Liquorland Howick PSA Open and the 2017 North Shore Open.
