= 2011 Island Games =

International multi-sport event

- Host: Isle of Wight, England
- Teams: 24 islands
- Athletes: 2,306
- Events: 15
- Opening: 25 June 2011
- Closing: 1 July 2011
- Opened by: Elizabeth II
- Main venue: St. George's Park

The XIV Island Games (also known as the 2011 Natwest Island Games for sponsorship reasons) were a major international multi-sport event held from 25 June to 1 July 2011, in the Isle of Wight, England. A total of 2,306 athletes from 24 islands competed in 15 sports and 190 events. The 2011 Island Games were the second Island Games to be hosted by the Isle of Wight (the fourth island to host multiple Games). Previously, the Isle of Wight hosted the 1993 Island Games.

The Games' mascot was a Red Squirrel, which is indigenous to the Isle of Wight.

== The Games ==
=== Participating teams ===
24 islands competed in the 2011 Island Games. The numbers in parentheses indicate the number of competitors from each country. A grand total of 2,306 athletes attended the games, with 555 officials.

- Åland Islands (120 athletes)
- Alderney (34)
- Bermuda (102)
- Cayman Islands (70)
- Falkland Islands (43)
- Faroe Islands (100)
- Frøya (18)
- Gibraltar (140)
- Gotland (132)
- Greenland (74)
- Guernsey (210)
- Hitra (46)
- Isle of Man (189)
- Isle of Wight (Host) (252)
- Jersey (199)
- Menorca (125)
- Orkney (40)
- Rhodes (70)
- Saaremaa (110)
- Sark (11)
- Shetland Islands (82)
- (Saint Helena) St Helena (8)
- Western Isles (66)
- (Anglesey) Ynys Môn (65)

Prince Edward Island were set to participate after missing out in 2009, but following a series of events including pulling out of contention for hosting the 2013 edition, the Island withdrew from all future editions of the Island Games and resigned from the International Island Games Association.

=== Sports ===
Numbers in parentheses indicate the number of medal events contested in each sport.

- Archery (12)
- Athletics (41)
- Badminton (6)
- Basketball (2)
- Cycling (18)
- Football (2)
- Golf (2)
- Sailing (5)
- Shooting (36)
- Squash (6)
- Swimming (43)
- Table tennis (6)
- Tennis (7)
- Volleyball (2)
- Windsurfing (2)

=== Calendar ===
OC	Opening ceremony	●	Event competitions	1	Event finals	CC	Closing ceremony

June/July	25th Sat	26th Sun	27th Mon	28th Tue	29th Wed	30th Thu	1st Fri	
Ceremonies	OC						CC	
Archery			2	2	2	2		8
Athletics		5	7	6	6	7	8	39
Badminton		●	1	●	●	●	5	6
Basketball		●	●	●	●	●	2	2
Cycling		2	2	2		2	2	10
Football		●	●	●		●	2	2
Golf				●	●	●	2	2
Sailing		●	●	●		1	2	3
Shooting		8	9	10	9	6	4	46
Squash		●	1	●	2	2	1	6
Swimming			11	11	10	11		43
Table tennis		●	●	1	●	●	5	6
Tennis		●	2	●	●	●	5	7
Volleyball		●	●	●	●	●	2	2
Windsurfing		●	●	●	●	●	4	4
Total Gold Medals		15	35	32	29	31	44	186
June/July	25th Sat	26th Sun	27th Mon	28th Tue	29th Wed	30th Thu	1st Fri	T

=== Medal table ===
* Host nation (Isle of Wight)

Rank	Nation	Gold	Silver	Bronze	Total
1	Guernsey	40	42	25	107
2	Isle of Man	26	22	20	68
3	Jersey	23	30	30	83
4	Faroe Islands	20	20	15	55
5	Isle of Wight*	17	15	21	53
6	Åland	14	7	13	34
7	Gotland	9	12	21	42
8	Menorca	8	8	12	28
9	Cayman Islands	8	7	8	23
10	Shetland	7	4	4	15
11	Gibraltar	6	5	5	16
12	Saare County	4	5	7	16
13	Bermuda	3	5	10	18
14	Anglesey	2	2	0	4
15	Orkney	1	2	1	4
16	Western Isles	1	1	2	4
17	Sark	1	1	1	3
18	Hitra Municipality	0	1	2	3
19	Greenland	0	1	1	2
19	Rhodes	0	1	1	2
Totals (20 entries)		190	191	199	580
