= Olivia Cîmpian =

Romanian artistic gymnast (born 2001)

- Born: 1 January 2001 (age 25) Arad, Romania

Gymnastics career
- Discipline: Women's artistic gymnastics
- Country represented: Romania

Olivia Cîmpian (born 1 January 2001) is a Romanian former artistic gymnast. She competed at the 2017 European Championships and finished 23rd in the all-around. At the junior level, she won a bronze medal with the Romanian team at the 2016 European Championships.

== Gymnastics career ==
=== Junior ===
Cîmpian won a silver medal on the floor exercise at the 2014 Elite Gym Massilia behind Belgium's Axelle Klinckaert. Then at the 2014 Top Gym Tournament, she won the gold medal on the floor exercise. She competed with the Romanian team that finished fourth at the 2015 European Youth Olympic Festival, and she finished seventh in the floor exercise final.

Cîmpian tied with Alice Kinsella for the bronze medal on the floor exercise at the 2016 International Gymnix. She competed alongside Alisia Botnaru, Ioana Crișan, Carmen Ghiciuc, and Denisa Golgotă at the 2016 Junior European Championships, and they won the bronze medal behind Russia and Great Britain. She then won the all-around title at the 2016 Romanian Junior Championships.

=== Senior ===
Cîmpian became age-eligible for senior competitions in 2017. She made her senior debut at the Doha World Cup but did not advance into any apparatus finals. She qualified for the all-around final at the 2017 European Championships and finished 23rd.

After the European Championships, Cîmpian's father announced she would be leaving Romania to train in Hungary and would pursue citizenship to compete for Hungary internationally. She was able to receive Hungarian citizenship in September 2017 because her grandmother was Hungarian. The nationality change request was approved by the International Gymnastics Federation (FIG) in October, but Cîmpian would have to sit out of competition for one year because Romania did not release her. However, in July 2018, Cîmpian and her family returned to Romania with the intent of competing for Romania again. Her father indicated that her education was the main reason to return to Romania. The FIG approved the change back to Romania in December 2018, but the Hungarian federation refused to release Cîmpian, meaning she would be ineligible to compete until December 2019.

Cîmpian announced her retirement from gymnastics in October 2020 to attend medical school at the Vasile Goldiș Western University of Arad.

== Post-gymnastics ==
In 2020, Cîmpian was featured as one of the athletes in the music video for the Robin Schulz song All We Got.

== Competitive history ==
Competitive history of Olivia Cîmpian
| Year | Event | Team | AA | VT | UB | BB | FX |
Junior
| 2014 | Nadia Comaneci Invitational | 3rd place, bronze medalist(s) | 3rd place, bronze medalist(s) | | | | |
| 2014 | Elite Gym Massilia | 9 | | | | | 2nd place, silver medalist(s) |
| 2014 | Top Gym Tournament | 4 | 10 | | | | 1st place, gold medalist(s) |
| 2015 | Nadia Comaneci Invitational | 1st place, gold medalist(s) | 1st place, gold medalist(s) | 2nd place, silver medalist(s) | 3rd place, bronze medalist(s) | | 1st place, gold medalist(s) |
| 2015 | European Youth Olympic Festival | 4 | 14 | | | | 7 |
| 2015 | Romanian Championships | 3rd place, bronze medalist(s) | 5 | 3rd place, bronze medalist(s) | 3rd place, bronze medalist(s) | | 5 |
| 2016 | International Gymnix | 5 | 12 | | | | 3rd place, bronze medalist(s) |
| 2016 | BEL-ROU Friendly | 1st place, gold medalist(s) | 4 | | | | |
| 2016 | FRA-ROU Friendly | 1st place, gold medalist(s) | | | | | |
| 2016 | Junior European Championships | 3rd place, bronze medalist(s) | | 8 | | | WD |
| 2016 | Junior Romanian Championships | | 1st place, gold medalist(s) | 2nd place, silver medalist(s) | 1st place, gold medalist(s) | 1st place, gold medalist(s) | 1st place, gold medalist(s) |
| 2016 | Top Gym Tournament | 2nd place, silver medalist(s) | 3rd place, bronze medalist(s) | 1st place, gold medalist(s) | 2nd place, silver medalist(s) | 2nd place, silver medalist(s) | 1st place, gold medalist(s) |
Senior
2017
| 2017 | European Championships | | 23 | | | | |
