= 2018 City of Jesolo Trophy =

2018 Italian gymnastics competition

- Venue: SGA Gymnasium
- Location: Jesolo, Italy
- Dates: April 14–15, 2018

The 2018 City of Jesolo Trophy was the 11th annual Trofeo di Jesolo gymnastics competition held in Jesolo, Italy. Both senior and junior gymnasts were invited to compete.

== Medal table ==
Rank	Nation	Gold	Silver	Bronze	Total
1	Russia	6	2	5	13
2	United States	3	3	1	7
3	Italy	2	2	3	7
4	China	1	1	0	2
5	France	1	0	4	5
6	Brazil	0	2	0	2
7	Romania	0	1	0	1
Totals (7 entries)		13	11	13	37

== Medalists ==
Event	Gold	Silver	Bronze
Senior
Team all-around	Russia (RUS); Eleonora Afanasyeva; Angelina Melnikova; Uliana Perebinosova; Anastasia Iliankova	Brazil (BRA); Jade Barbosa; Luiza Domingues; Carolyne Pedro; Flávia Saraiva	Italy (ITA); Martina Basile; Desiree Carofiglio; Giada Grisetti; Lara Mori
Individual all-around	Emma Malabuyo (USA)	Ragan Smith (USA)	Anastasia Ilyankova (RUS)
Vault	Liu Jinru (CHN)	Angelina Melnikova (RUS)	Eleonora Afanasyeva (RUS)
Uneven bars	Anastasia Ilyankova (RUS)	Ragan Smith (USA)	Angelina Melnikova (RUS)
Balance beam	Emma Malabuyo (USA)	Ragan Smith (USA)	Angelina Melnikova (RUS)
Floor exercise	Emma Malabuyo (USA)	Flávia Saraiva (BRA)	Grace McCallum (USA); Desiree Carofiglio (ITA)
Junior
Team all-around	Italy (ITA); Asia D’Amato; Alessia Federici; Elisa Iorio; Giorgia Villa	Russia (RUS); Daria Belousova; Elena Gerasimova; Ksenia Klimenko; Vladislava Urazova	France (FRA); Carolann Heduit; Claire Pontlevoy; Celia Serber; Mathilde Wahl
Individual all-around	Vladislava Urazova (RUS)	Giorgia Villa (ITA)	Celia Serber (FRA)
Vault	Celia Serber (FRA)	Asia D'Amato (ITA)	Vladislava Urazova (RUS)
Uneven bars	Elisa Iorio (ITA); Ksenia Klimenko (RUS)	N/A	Carolann Heduit (FRA)
Balance beam	Vladislava Urazova (RUS)	Iulia Berar (ROU)	Elisa Iorio (ITA)
Floor exercise	Vladislava Urazova (RUS)	Yin Sisi (CHN)	Celia Serber (FRA)

== Results ==
=== Senior ===
==== All-Around ====
Rank	Gymnast	Vault (gymnastics)	Uneven bars	Balance beam	Floor (gymnastics)	Total
1st place, gold medalist(s)	Emma Malabuyo (USA)	14.467	13.267	14.267	13.867	55.868
2nd place, silver medalist(s)	Ragan Smith (USA)	13.800	14.233	14.200	12.933	55.166
3rd place, bronze medalist(s)	Anastasia Ilyankova (RUS)	13.767	14.533	13.400	12.867	54.567
4	Angelina Melnikova (RUS)	14.600	13.667	12.800	13.433	54.500
5	Grace McCallum (USA)	14.533	13.600	12.167	13.633	53.933
6	Jade Barbosa (BRA)	14.333	13.200	13.233	13.000	53.766
7	Adeline Kenlin (USA)	14.567	12.367	13.267	13.267	53.468
8	Flávia Saraiva (BRA)	14.467	12.633	12.633	13.733	53.466
9	Lorette Charpy (FRA)	13.633	13.900	12.633	12.700	52.866
10	Martina Basile (ITA)	13.900	12.867	12.700	12.567	52.034
11	Carolyne Pedro (BRA)	13.900	13.067	11.867	13.200	52.034
12	Denisa Golgotă (ROU)	14.400	12.300	12.467	12.767	51.934
13	Lara Mori (ITA)	13.600	12.933	12.833	12.533	51.899
14	Louise Vanhille (FRA)	13.633	13.100	11.800	12.667	51.200
15	Desiree Carofiglio (ITA)	14.033	12.767	11.133	13.200	51.133
15	Olivia Dunne (USA)	13.933	12.933	11.367	12.900	51.133
17	Guo Fangting (CHN)	13.633	13.200	11.033	13.033	50.899
18	Uliana Perebinosova (RUS)	13.367	12.233	12.767	12.333	50.700
19	Sara Beradinelli (ITA)	13.433	12.900	11.967	12.233	50.533
20	Liu Jieyu (CHN)	13.400	12.833	11.633	12.400	50.266
21	Giada Grisetti (ITA)	13.467	13.700	11.433	11.633	50.233
22	Nica Ivanus (ROU)	13.633	10.500	12.800	12.900	49.833
23	Carmen Ghiciuc (ROU)	13.400	12.500	12.133	11.767	49.800
24	Qian Xuajia (CHN)	12.100	12.300	12.533	12.767	49.700
25	Sara Ricciardi (ITA)	13.633	12.433	11.600	11.933	49.599
26	Alyona Shchennikova (USA)	13.833	14.300	9.867	11.433	49.433
27	Luiza Domingues (BRA)	13.533	11.800	11.967	11.867	49.167
28	Carina Kröll (GER)	13.267	11.433	11.533	12.733	48.966
29	Maria Holbură (ROU)	13.000	11.000	11.400	12.733	48.133
30	Laurie-Lou Vézina (CAN)	12.633	11.600	11.000	12.500	47.733
31	Deborah Salmina (VEN)	13.500	11.733	9.833	12.233	47.299
32	Caterina Cerghetti (ITA)	13.333	12.533	12.500	8.833	47.199
33	Anamaria Ocolisan (ROU)	13.533	10.900	9.767	12.267	46.467

==== Vault ====
Rank	Gymnast	Vault 1	Vault 2	Average
Gold medal	Liu Jinru (CHN)	14.333	14.233	14.283
Silver medal	Angelina Melnikova (RUS)	14.533	14.000	14.267
Bronze medal	Eleonora Afanasyeva (RUS)	14.633	13.800	14.217
4	Denisa Golgotă (ROU)	14.467	13.667	14.067
5	Grace McCallum (USA)	14.667	13.367	14.017
6	Desiree Carofiglio (ITA)	14.367	13.533	13.950
7	Sara Ricciardi (ITA)	13.600	13.067	13.334

==== Uneven Bars ====
Rank	Gymnast	D Score	E Score	ND	Total
Gold medal	Anastasia Ilyankova (RUS)	6.1	8.500		14.600
Silver medal	Ragan Smith (USA)	6.0	8.567		14.567
Bronze medal	Angelina Melnikova (RUS)	5.9	8.433		14.333
4	Alyona Shchennikova (USA)	6.0	8.167		14.167
5	Lorette Charpy (FRA)	5.5	8.100		13.600
6	Jade Barbosa (BRA)	5.5	8.100		13.600
7	Giada Grisetti (ITA)	5.7	7.800		13.500
8	Guo Fangting (CHN)	4.7	8.033		12.733

==== Balance Beam ====
Rank	Gymnast	D Score	E Score	ND	Total
Gold medal	Emma Malabuyo (USA)	6.0	8.300		14.300
Silver medal	Ragan Smith (USA)	6.0	8.200		14.200
Bronze medal	Angelina Melnikova (RUS)	5.6	7.567		13.167
4	Jade Barbosa (BRA)	5.8	7.167	-0.1	12.867
5	Martina Basile (ITA)	5.3	7.267		12.567
6	Nica Ivanus (ROU)	5.0	6.500		11.500
7	Lara Mori (ITA)	5.2	6.200	-0.1	11.300
8	Anastasia Ilyankova (RUS)	5.0	6.100		11.100

==== Floor Exercise ====
Rank	Gymnast	D Score	E Score	ND	Total
Gold medal	Emma Malabuyo (USA)	5.9	8.267		14.167
Silver medal	Flávia Saraiva (BRA)	5.3	8.600		13.900
Bronze medal	Grace McCallum (USA)	5.1	8.333		13.433
Bronze medal	Desiree Carofiglio (ITA)	5.2	8.233		13.433
5	Angelina Melnikova (RUS)	5.9	7.533	-0.3	13.133
6	Carolyne Pedro (BRA)	5.1	7.800		12.900
7	Nica Ivanus (ROU)	5.0	7.433		12.433
8	Guo Fangting (CHN)	5.0	6.833	-0.1	11.733

=== Junior ===
==== All-Around ====
Rank	Gymnast	Vault (gymnastics)	Uneven bars	Balance beam	Floor (gymnastics)	Total
1st place, gold medalist(s)	Vladislava Urazova (RUS)	14.200	13.633	13.767	13.000	54.600
2nd place, silver medalist(s)	Giorgia Villa (ITA)	14.433	13.667	13.033	13.400	54.533
3rd place, bronze medalist(s)	Celia Serber (FRA)	14.300	12.833	12.867	13.567	53.567
4	Elisa Iorio (ITA)	13.467	13.300	13.200	13.467	53.434
5	Asia D'Amato (ITA)	14.333	13.233	11.967	13.133	52.666
6	Daria Belousova (RUS)	13.467	13.667	12.500	12.700	52.334
7	Tori Tatum (USA)	14.333	13.067	11.833	13.067	52.300
8	Phoebe Jakubczyk (GBR)	13.667	12.333	12.600	13.067	51.667
9	Elena Gerasimova (RUS)	12.800	12.333	13.500	12.667	51.300
10	Maathilde Wahl (FRA)	13.433	12.233	12.100	13.200	50.966
11	Carolann Heduit (FRA)	13.433	13.900	10.133	13.133	50.599
12	Yin Sisi (CHN)	12.233	13.267	11.033	13.767	50.300
12	Iulia Berar (ROU)	12.067	12.733	12.700	12.800	50.300

==== Vault ====
Rank	Gymnast	Vault 1	Vault 2	Average
Gold medal	Celia Serber (FRA)	14.267	14.133	14.200
Silver medal	Asia D'Amato (ITA)	14.667	13.600	14.134
Bronze medal	Vladislava Urazova (RUS)	14.333	13.700	14.017
4	Giorgia Villa (ITA)	14.400	13.600	14.000
5	Tori Tatum (USA)	14.267	13.500	13.884
6	Luiza Silva (BRA)	13.500	13.167	13.334
7	Mia Saint-Pierre (CAN)	13.400	13.100	13.250
8	Phoebe Jakubczyk (GBR)	13.533	12.233	12.883

==== Uneven Bars ====
Rank	Gymnast	D Score	E Score	ND	Total
Gold medal	Elisa Iorio (ITA)	5.9	8.367		14.267
Gold medal	Ksenia Klimenko (RUS)	5.9	8.367		14.267
Bronze medal	Carolann Heduit (FRA)	6.2	8.000		14.200
4	Giorgia Villa (ITA)	5.9	7.900		13.800
5	Yin Sisi (CHN)	5.5	8.200		13.700
6	Daria Belousova (RUS)	5.3	8.333		13.633
7	Claire Pontlevoy (FRA)	5.7	7.700		13.300
8	Tori Tatum (USA)	5.2	8.033		13.233

==== Balance Beam ====
Rank	Gymnast	D Score	E Score	ND	Total
Gold medal	Vladislava Urazova (RUS)	5.7	8.267		13.967
Silver medal	Iulia Berar (ROU)	5.3	7.833		13.133
Bronze medal	Elisa Iorio (ITA)	5.0	7.667		12.667
4	Celia Serber (FRA)	5.3	7.333		12.633
5	Alessia Federici (ITA)	5.3	7.000		12.300
6	Elena Gerasimova (RUS)	5.5	6.533		12.033
7	Wei Xiaoyuan (CHN)	4.7	5.967		10.667
8	Phoebe Jakubczyk (GBR)	4.7	5.133		9.833

==== Floor Exercise ====
Rank	Gymnast	D Score	E Score	ND	Total
Gold medal	Vladislava Urazova (RUS)	5.3	8.767		13.867
Silver medal	Yin Sisi (CHN)	5.1	8.600		13.700
Bronze medal	Celia Serber (FRA)	5.1	8.133		13.233
4	Elisa Iorio (ITA)	5.1	7.900		13.000
5	Mathilde Wahl (FRA)	4.6	8.233		12.833
6	Tori Tatum (USA)	5.0	7.333		12.333
7	Giorgia Villa (ITA)	5.0	7.167		12.167
8	Phoebe Jakubczyk (GBR)	4.4	8.000	-0.3	12.100

== Participants ==
The following federations sent teams:

- Brazil
- Canada
- China
- France
- United Kingdom
- Germany
- Italy
- Romania
- Russia
