= Lepin =

Lepin (Russian: Ле́пин) is a Russian surname and a Russified form of the Latvian language surname Liepiņš. It may refer to:

== People ==
- Alison Lepin (born 2000), French artistic gymnast
- Anatoly Lepin (1907–1984), Soviet composer
- Eduard Lepin (1889–1938), Soviet division commander and Komkor
- Kanstantsin Lepin (born 1988), Belarusian former professional footballer
- Lidiya Lepin (Lidija Liepiņa; 1891–1985), Latvian chemist

== Other ==
- Łępin, a village in Gmina Stara Błotnica, Białobrzegi County, Masovian Voivodeship, Poland
- a Lego clone manufactured by Guangdong Loongon

== See also ==
- Lepine (disambiguation)
- L'Épine (disambiguation)
- Liepiņš
