= Liepiņš =

Family name

Origin
- Origin: Latvian
- Meaning: "little linden tree"

Other names
- Variant form: Lepin

Liepiņš (Old orthography: Leepin(g); feminine: Liepiņa) is a Latvian topographic surname, derived from the Latvian word for "linden tree" (liepa). Individuals with the surname include:

- Arvis Liepiņš (born 1990), Latvian cross-country skier
- Emīls Liepiņš (born 1992), Latvian cyclist
- Jānis Liepiņš (1894–1964), Latvian painter
- Kaspars Liepiņš (born 1984), Latvian sidecarcross rider
- Ilmārs Liepiņš (1947–2007), Latvian football player
- Modris Liepiņš (born 1966), Latvian race walker
- Zigmārs Liepiņš (born 1952), Latvian composer

== See also ==
- Lepin (disambiguation)
- Liepa
