= Maria Holbură =

Romanian artistic gymnast (born 2000)

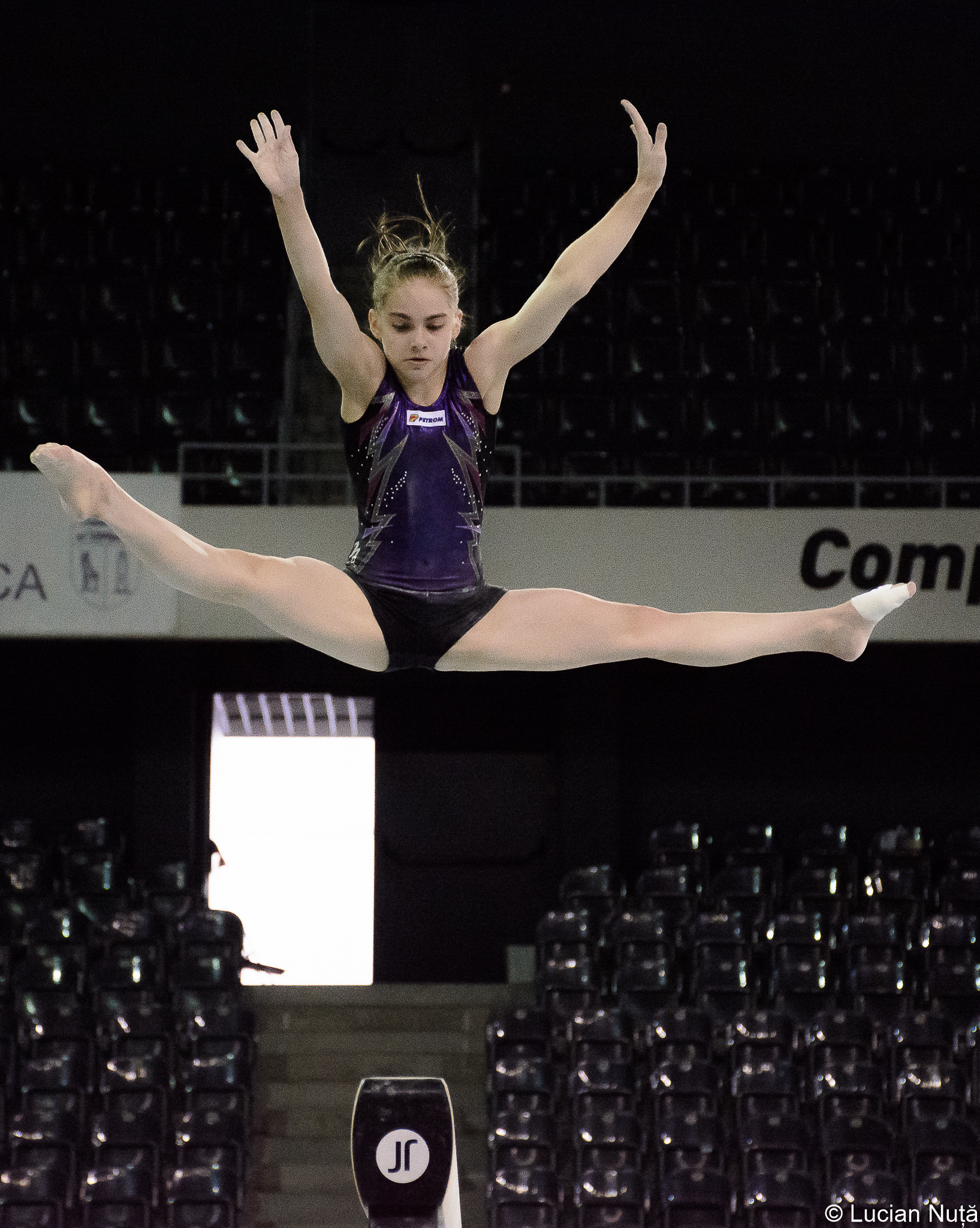
- Holbură in 2016
- Full name: Maria Larisa Holbură
- Born: 16 September 2000 (age 25) Constanța, Romania
- Height: 152 cm (5 ft 0 in)

Gymnastics career
- Discipline: Women's artistic gymnastics
- Country represented: Romania (2014–2021)
- Club: CS Farul Constanța
- Head coaches: Lăcrămioara Filip, Cristian Moldovan
- Former coach: Mirela Szemerjai
- Retired: 10 August 2021

Maria Larisa Holbură (born 16 September 2000) is a Romanian former artistic gymnast. She represented Romania at the 2020 Summer Olympics and at the 2018 and 2019 World Championships.

== Personal life ==
Maria Holbură was born on 16 September 2000 in Constanța. Her father, Ioan Holbură, is a former wrestler. She began gymnastics at the age of five after a coach, Sorin Bechir, held a gymnastics audition in her kindergarten class. She left her home at age twelve to train in Deva. Holbură spends her free time painting. On painting, she stated, "I like it very much, sometimes I come upset from training because I didn't get anything, but when I get to the room I start painting and I pass. It relaxes me extraordinarily."

== Junior gymnastics career ==
Holbură made her international debut at the 2014 International Gymnix in Montreal where she finished nineteenth in the all-around and fifth on the floor exercise. She then competed at the 2014 Coupe Avenir in Malmedy, Belgium, where Romania placed first ahead of Belgium and Canada, and Holbură placed fourth in the all-around and on vault. She competed at the 2015 Elite Gym Massilia in Marseille, France, where she finished thirteenth in the all-around with a score of 54.200.

== Senior gymnastics career ==
=== 2016 ===
Holbură's first year of being age-eligible for senior international competitions was 2016. She made her senior international debut at the Belgium Friendly where Romania finished second behind Belgium, and Holbură placed tenth in the all-around. She was selected to compete at the Olympic Test Event alongside Diana Bulimar, Anamaria Ocolișan, Cătălina Ponor, Dora Vulcan, and Silvia Zarzu. She contributed on three apparatuses, and she scored a 12.866 on the uneven bars, a 13.533 on the balance beam, and a 13.541 on the floor exercise. However, the team finished seventh and did not qualify for the Olympic Games. She then competed at the Encuentro Internacional, which was a competition between Spain and Romania. She won the gold medal on the balance beam and placed third in the all-around with a total score of 54.600.

Holbură then competed with Anda Butuc, Ocolișan, Ponor, and Zarzu at the European Championships. In the qualifying round, she competed on three events and scored a 13.333 on the uneven bars, a 13.700 on the balance beam, and a 13.633 on the floor exercise. In the qualification round, Romania placed fourth, and they went on to finish sixth in the team final. At the Romanian Championships, she won the bronze medal on the uneven bars on the floor exercise. Her final competition of the season was the Gymnasiade in Trabzon, Turkey, and she won the silver medal on the floor exercise with a score of 13.733.

=== 2017 ===
Holbură competed at the World Cup in Osijek where she finished eighth on uneven bars. She competed at the Gym Festival Trnava which was held from 3–4 June in Trnava, Slovakia, and she placed sixth in the all-around. She then competed at the Romanian Championships where she won the bronze medal on the uneven bars and placed fifth in the all-around. Her final competition of the year was the World Cup in Szombathely where she finished fourth on balance beam.

=== 2018 ===
Holbură began her 2018 season at the World Cup in Doha, but she did not advance to any of the event finals. She then went to the City of Jesolo Trophy where she finished twenth-ninth in the all-around. Then at the World Cup in Osijek, she placed fifth on the balance beam and sixth on the floor exercise. At the Romanian Championships, she placed sixth in the all-around and won the silver medal on the uneven bars and the bronze medal on the floor exercise. She was then selected to compete at the World Championships along with Ioana Crișan, Denisa Golgotă, Nica Ivanus, and Carmen Ghiciuc where they finished thirteenth and qualified as a team to the 2019 World Championships.

=== 2019 ===
Holbură competed at the World Cup in Osijek where she finished fifth on the floor exercise. Holbură said that she considered retiring in 2019 due to ongoing injuries and health problems, but she ultimately decided to stay to help team Romania at the World Championships in their quest to qualify as a team for the 2020 Summer Olympics. She competed at the World Championships with Ioana Crișan, Carmen Ghiciuc, and Denisa Golgotă where they finished twenty-second in the qualification round. This is the lowest the Romanian women have ever placed as a team at the World Artistic Gymnastics Championships, and they did not qualify as a team for the Olympics. However, Holbură qualified an individual spot for the Olympics. She noted that because she had decided to retire after the World Championships, she felt less pressure which led to her having a better competition. Holbură stated after their performance, "I didn't know if it was true... Everyone told me that I was the only one qualified for the Olympics and only I could go there. I called my mother and she started to cry, [but] I was also very sorry that [the team did not qualify]."

After the World Championships, Holbură had surgery in Vienna for tendon pain in her foot that had been ongoing since 2017.

=== 2020 ===
Holbură competed at the Romanian Championships where she finished ninth in the all-around. On the next day of the competition for event finals, Holbură only competed on the uneven bars and balance beam and withdrew on the other events due to ankle pain. Although Holbură was initially named to Romania's team for the European Championships, she was later removed in favor of Daniela Trică.

=== 2021 ===
Holbură was initially named as an alternate for the European Championships. However, when Silviana Sfiringu and Ioana Stănciulescu both withdrew due to injuries, they were replaced by Maria Ceplinschi, and Holbură was not added to the team because she was "insufficiently prepared". After the European Championships, Holbură switched coaches to train with Lăcrămioara Filip and Cristian Moldovan alongside Larisa Iordache in Bucharest as they both prepared for the Olympic Games. Holbură and Iordache both competed at the Cairo World Challenge Cup, and Holbură was the reserve for both the balance beam and floor exercise event finals.

At the Olympic Games, Holbură finished sixty-fifth in the all-around during the qualification round with a total score of 49.166. On 10 August, she announced her retirement from gymnastics on her Instagram account.

== Competitive history ==
Competitive history of Maria Holbură
Year	Event	Team	AA	VT	UB	BB	FX
2014	International Gymnix		19				5
2014	Coupe Avenir	1st place, gold medalist(s)	4	4			
2015	Élite Gym Massilia		13				
2016	Belgium Friendly	2nd place, silver medalist(s)	10				
2016	Olympic Test Event	7					
2016	Encuentro Internacional	2nd place, silver medalist(s)	3rd place, bronze medalist(s)			1st place, gold medalist(s)	
2016	European Championships	6					
2016	Romanian Championships	1st place, gold medalist(s)	4	8	3rd place, bronze medalist(s)	4	3rd place, bronze medalist(s)
2016	France-Romania Friendly	2nd place, silver medalist(s)	7				
2016	Gymnasiade	2nd place, silver medalist(s)	5				2nd place, silver medalist(s)
2017	Osijek World Challenge Cup				8		
2017	Gym Festival Trnava		6		5		5
2017	Romanian Championships	3rd place, bronze medalist(s)	5		3rd place, bronze medalist(s)	7	
2017	Szombathely World Challenge Cup					4	
2018	City of Jesolo Trophy		29				
2018	Deva Friendly	1st place, gold medalist(s)	6				
2018	Osijek World Challenge Cup					5	6
2018	Izvorani Friendly	1st place, gold medalist(s)					
2018	Varsenare Friendly	3rd place, bronze medalist(s)					
2018	Romanian Championships		6		2nd place, silver medalist(s)		3rd place, bronze medalist(s)
2018	World Championships	13					
2019	Osijek World Challenge Cup						5
2019	FIT Challenge	2nd place, silver medalist(s)					
2019	Romanian Championships		8		5		6
2019	World Championships	22					
2020	Romanian Championships		9		5	5	
2021	Cairo World Challenge Cup					R1	R2
2021	FIT Challenge	8					
2021	Olympic Games		65				
