= 2016 City of Jesolo Trophy =

- Venue: SGA Gymnasium
- Location: Jesolo, Italy
- Dates: March 19–20, 2016
- Nations: 7

The 2016 City of Jesolo Trophy was the ninth edition of the City of Jesolo Trophy gymnastics competition, held at the SGA Gymnasium in Jesolo, Italy from March 19–20, 2016. Teams from Italy, United States, Brazil and France attended, as well as junior individuals from Canada, Germany, Slovenia, and Finland.

== Medal table ==
Rank	Nation	Gold	Silver	Bronze	Total
1	United States	11	9	5	25
2	Italy	0	2	2	4
3	Brazil	0	1	0	1
4	Canada	0	0	1	1
4	France	0	0	1	1
4	Germany	0	0	1	1
Totals (6 entries)		11	12	10	33

== Medalists ==
Event	Gold	Silver	Bronze
Senior
Team	United States; Gabby Douglas; Laurie Hernandez; Ashton Locklear; Aly Raisman; Emily Schild; MyKayla Skinner	Brazil; Rebeca Andrade; Jade Barbosa; Daniele Hypólito; Carolyne Pedro; Flavia Saraiva	Italy; Giorgia Campana; Desiree Carofiglio; Carlotta Ferlito; Alessia Leolini; Enus Mariani; Tea Ugrin
All-Around	Gabby Douglas (USA)	Ragan Smith (USA)	Laurie Hernandez (USA)
Vault	Mykayla Skinner (USA)	Laurie Hernandez (USA)	Emily Schild (USA)
Uneven Bars	Ashton Locklear (USA)	Gabby Douglas (USA)	Loan His (FRA)
Balance Beam	Laurie Hernandez (USA)	Ragan Smith (USA)	Aly Raisman (USA)
Floor Exercise	Aly Raisman (USA)	Ragan Smith (USA)	Gabby Douglas (USA)
Junior
All-Around	Jordan Chiles (USA)	Emma Malabuyo (USA)	Gabby Perea (USA)
Vault	Jordan Chiles (USA)	Martina Maggio (ITA)	Jade Chrobok (CAN)
Uneven Bars	Gabby Perea (USA)	Emma Malabuyo (USA); Jordan Chiles (USA)	none awarded
Balance Beam	Emma Malabuyo (USA)	Martina Maggio (ITA)	Helene Schaffer (GER)
Floor Exercise	Trinity Thomas (USA)	Emma Malabuyo (USA)	Martina Maggio (ITA)

== Results ==
=== Seniors ===
==== Team ====
Rank	Team	Vault (gymnastics)	Uneven bars	Balance beam	Floor (gymnastics)	Total
1st place, gold medalist(s)	United States	60.450	60.100	59.450	57.350	237.350
1st place, gold medalist(s)	Gabby Douglas	15.300	15.050	14.750	14.550	237.350
1st place, gold medalist(s)	Laurie Hernandez	15.100	13.800	15.300	14.350	237.350
1st place, gold medalist(s)	Ashton Locklear		15.650	13.800		237.350
1st place, gold medalist(s)	Aly Raisman	13.950	14.350	14.950	14.600	237.350
1st place, gold medalist(s)	Emily Schild	14.850	15.000	14.100	13.500	237.350
1st place, gold medalist(s)	MyKayla Skinner	15.200	14.400	14.450	13.850	237.350
2nd place, silver medalist(s)	Brazil	57.550	57.200	55.500	53.450	223.700
2nd place, silver medalist(s)	Rebeca Andrade	14.350	14.600	13.150		223.700
2nd place, silver medalist(s)	Jade Barbosa	14.000	14.450	14.050	13.500	223.700
2nd place, silver medalist(s)	Daniele Hypólito	13.050	13.750	13.150	12.900	223.700
2nd place, silver medalist(s)	Carolyne Pedro	14.150	13.550	13.350	13.050	223.700
2nd place, silver medalist(s)	Flavia Saraiva	15.050	14.400	14.950	14.000	223.700
3rd place, bronze medalist(s)	Italy	57.500	54.650	56.050	54.200	222.400
3rd place, bronze medalist(s)	Giorgia Campana	13.850	13.700	13.900	13.200	222.400
3rd place, bronze medalist(s)	Desiree Carofiglio	14.550	12.400	12.450	13.350	222.400
3rd place, bronze medalist(s)	Carlotta Ferlito	14.650	13.750	14.100	13.800	222.400
3rd place, bronze medalist(s)	Alessia Leolini	14.200	13.150	12.600	12.850	222.400
3rd place, bronze medalist(s)	Enus Mariani	14.100	13.000	14.150	13.850	222.400
3rd place, bronze medalist(s)	Tea Ugrin	14.100	14.050	13.900	13.050	222.400
4	France	56.350	56.600	55.250	52.950	221.150
4	Camille Bahl	13.200	12.500	13.800	12.900	221.150
4	Marine Brevet	14.150	13.650	14.100	13.450	221.150
4	Loan His	14.250	14.400	13.500	11.600	221.150
4	Anne Kuhm	13.900	13.700	13.100	13.150	221.150
4	Oréane Lechenault	13.950	14.250	11.450	13.450	221.150
4	Louise Vanhille	14.000	14.250	13.850		221.150
	Individuals					
	Ragan Smith (USA)	14.850	14.600	15.100	14.500	
	Emily Gaskins (USA)	14.350	13.650	13.300	12.950	
	Sydney Johnson-Scharpf (USA)	13.850	13.500	12.950	13.350	
	Marine Boyer (FRA)	14.300	13.600	14.850		

==== All-around ====
Rank	Gymnast	Vault (gymnastics)	Uneven bars	Balance beam	Floor (gymnastics)	Total
1st place, gold medalist(s)	Gabby Douglas (USA)	15.300	15.050	14.750	14.550	59.650
2nd place, silver medalist(s)	Ragan Smith (USA)	14.850	14.600	15.100	14.500	59.050
3rd place, bronze medalist(s)	Laurie Hernandez (USA)	15.100	13.800	15.300	14.350	58.550
4	Flavia Saraiva (BRA)	15.050	14.400	14.950	14.000	58.400
5	MyKayla Skinner (USA)	15.200	14.400	14.450	13.850	57.900
6	Aly Raisman (USA)	13.950	14.350	14.950	14.600	57.850
7	Emily Schild (USA)	14.850	15.000	14.100	13.500	57.450
8	Carlotta Ferlito (ITA)	14.650	13.750	14.100	13.800	56.300
9	Jade Barbosa (BRA)	14.000	14.450	14.050	13.500	56.000
10	Marine Brevet (FRA)	14.150	13.650	14.100	13.450	55.350
11T	Enus Mariani (ITA)	14.100	13.000	14.150	13.850	55.100
11T	Tea Ugrin (ITA)	14.100	14.050	13.900	13.050	55.100
13	Giorgia Campana (ITA)	13.850	13.700	13.900	13.200	54.650
14	Emily Gaskins (USA)	14.350	13.650	13.300	12.950	54.250
15	Carolyne Pedro (ITA)	14.150	13.550	13.350	13.050	54.100
16	Anne Kuhm (FRA)	13.900	13.700	13.100	13.150	53.850
17	Loan His (FRA)	14.250	14.400	13.500	11.600	53.750
18	Sydney Johnson-Scharpf (USA)	13.850	13.500	12.950	13.350	53.650
19	Oréane Lechenault (FRA)	13.950	14.250	11.450	13.450	53.100
20	Daniele Hypólito (BRA)	13.050	13.750	13.150	12.900	52.850
21	Alessia Leolini (ITA)	14.200	13.150	12.600	12.850	52.800
22	Desiree Carofiglio (ITA)	14.550	12.400	12.450	13.350	52.750
23	Camille Bahl (FRA)	13.200	12.550	13.800	12.900	52.450
24	Marine Boyer (FRA)	14.300	13.600	14.850		42.750
25T	Rebeca Andrade (BRA)	13.150	14.600	13.150		42.100
25T	Louise Vanhille (FRA)	14.000	14.250	13.850		42.100
27	Ashton Locklear (USA)		15.650	13.800		29.450

==== Vault ====
Rank	Gymnast	Difficulty	Execution	Penalty	Total
Gold medal	MyKayla Skinner (USA)	6.3	8.900	–	15.200
Silver medal	Laurie Hernandez (USA)	5.8	9.050	–	14.850
Bronze medal	Emily Schild (USA)	5.8	8.600	–	14.400
4	Alessia Leolini (ITA)	5.4	8.800	–	14.200
5T	Loan His (FRA)	5.0	9.100	–	14.100
5T	Desiree Carofiglio (ITA)	5.3	8.900	0.1	14.100

==== Uneven bars ====
Rank	Gymnast	Difficulty	Execution	Penalty	Total
Gold medal	Ashton Locklear (USA)	6.5	8.750	–	15.250
Silver medal	Gabby Douglas (USA)	6.1	8.800	–	14.900
Bronze medal	Loan His (FRA)	6.1	8.150	–	14.250
4	Louise Vanhille (FRA)	6.0	8.200	–	14.200
5	Emily Schild (USA)	6.3	7.700	–	14.000
6	Jade Barbosa (BRA)	5.9	7.250	-	13.150
7	Tea Ugrin (ITA)	5.9	7.050	–	12.950
8	Rebeca Andrade (BRA)	5.9	7.000	-	12.900

==== Balance beam ====
Rank	Gymnast	Difficulty	Execution	Penalty	Total
Gold medal	Laurie Hernandez (USA)	6.4	8.850	–	15.250
Silver medal	Ragan Smith (USA)	6.3	8.900	–	15.200
Bronze medal	Aly Raisman (USA)	6.2	8.550	–	14.750
4	Marine Boyer (FRA)	6.3	8.400	–	14.700
5	Flavia Saraiva (BRA)	6.1	8.300	–	14.400
6	Enus Mariani (ITA)	5.6	8.250	-	13.850
7	Marine Brevet (FRA)	5.6	8.200	–	13.800
8	Carlotta Ferlito (ITA)	4.8	7.350	-	12.150

==== Floor exercise ====
Rank	Gymnast	Difficulty	Execution	Penalty	Total
Gold medal	Aly Raisman (USA)	6.3	8.750	–	15.050
Silver medal	Ragan Smith (USA)	6.2	8.450	–	14.650
Bronze medal	Gabby Douglas (USA)	6.1	8.400	–	14.500
4	Flavia Saraiva (BRA)	5.7	8.450	0.1	14.050
5	Enus Mariani (ITA)	5.4	8.350	–	13.750
6	Carolyne Pedro (BRA)	5.6	8.250	0.1	13.100
7	Giorgia Campana (ITA)	5.0	7.950	–	12.950
8	Desiree Carofiglio (ITA)	5.3	7.050	0.1	12.250

=== Junior competition ===
==== All-around ====
Rank	Gymnast	Vault (gymnastics)	Uneven bars	Balance beam	Floor (gymnastics)	Total
1st place, gold medalist(s)	Jordan Chiles (USA)	15.700	14.100	14.300	14.150	58.250
2nd place, silver medalist(s)	Emma Malabuyo (USA)	14.250	14.100	14.100	13.700	56.150
3rd place, bronze medalist(s)	Gabby Perea (USA)	14.200	14.650	13.600	13.300	55.750
4	Ana Padurariu (CAN)	13.500	13.700	14.850	13.550	55.600
5	Trinity Thomas (USA)	14.050	13.400	13.000	14.000	54.450
6	Giorgia Villa (ITA)	13.800	14.150	13.150	13.250	54.350
7	Martina Maggio (ITA)	13.800	13.150	14.150	13.550	54.350
8	Noemi Linari (ITA)	13.900	12.800	13.750	13.450	53.900
9	Maria Vittoria Cocciolo (ITA)	13.650	13.000	13.700	12.850	53.200
10	Asia D'Amato (ITA)	13.750	13.350	12.850	12.700	52.650
11	Sidney Saturnino (ITA)	13.500	12.350	13.550	13.150	52.550
12	Martina Basile (ITA)	13.750	12.500	13.800	12.100	52.150
13	Giulia Bencini (ITA)	13.750	12.000	12.400	12.600	50.750
14	Helene Schafer (GER)	12.500	12.850	12.750	12.550	50.650
15	Elisa Iorio (ITA)	13.450	12.150	12.400	12.350	50.350
16	Jade Chrobok (CAN)	14.100	11.700	11.300	13.150	50.250
17	Sara Berardinelli (ITA)	13.550	11.950	12.200	12.450	50.150
18	Giorgia Balottari (ITA)	13.000	11.900	13.400	11.750	50.050
19	Lucija Hribar (SLO)	13.750	11.400	12.200	12.350	49.700
20	Lisa Schoniger (GER)	13.000	12.100	12.700	11.550	49.350
21	Enni Kuttenen (FIN)	12.800	10.700	11.600	11.850	46.950
22	Pia Hribar (SLO)	11.900	11.300	11.550	12.150	46.900
23	Tira Kuitunen (FIN)	12.850	9.300	10.800	12.200	45.150
24	Lara Crnjac (SLO)	13.100	7.700	11.100	12.000	43.900
25	Emilia Kemppi (FIN)	12.000	8.900	9.659	10.600	41.150

==== Vault ====
Rank	Gymnast	#	A-score	B-score	Penalty	Scores	Average
Gold medal	Jordan Chiles (USA)	1	6.3	9.450	–	15.750	15.575
Gold medal	Jordan Chiles (USA)	2	5.4	9.600	–	15.400	15.575
Silver medal	Martina Maggio (ITA)	1	5.3	8.800	–	14.100	14.050
Silver medal	Martina Maggio (ITA)	2	5.0	9.000	–	14.000	14.050
Bronze medal	Jade Chrobok (CAN)	1	5.3	8.900	–	14.200	13.875
Bronze medal	Jade Chrobok (CAN)	2	5.0	8.550	–	13.550	13.875
4	Martina Basile (ITA)	1	5.3	8.650	-	13.950	13.825
4	Martina Basile (ITA)	2	5.0	8.700	–	13.700	13.825
5	Noemi Linari (ITA)	1	5.3	7.450	–	12.750	13.100
5	Noemi Linari (ITA)	2	5.0	8.550	0.1	13.450	13.100
6	Lucija Hribar (SLO)	1	5.0	8.700	-	13.700	12.875
6	Lucija Hribar (SLO)	2	4.4	7.650	–	12.050	12.875
7	Lara Crnjac (SLO)	1	0.0	0.000	–	0.000	6.250
7	Lara Crnjac (SLO)	2	4.2	8.400	0.1	12.500	6.250

==== Uneven bars ====
Rank	Gymnast	Difficulty	Execution	Penalty	Total
Gold medal	Gabby Perea (USA)	6.0	8.650	–	14.650
Silver medal	Emma Malabuyo (USA)	5.5	8.850	–	14.350
Silver medal	Jordan Chiles (USA)	5.7	8.650	–	14.350
4	Giorgia Villa (ITA)	5.7	8.300	–	14.000
5	Helene Schaffer (GER)	4.6	8.150	–	12.750
6	Maria Vittoria Cocciolo (ITA)	4.8	7.750	-	12.550
7	Ana Padurariu (CAN)	4.9	7.200	–	12.100
8	Asia D'Amato (ITA)	5.2	5.800	-	11.000

==== Balance beam ====
Rank	Gymnast	Difficulty	Execution	Penalty	Total
Gold medal	Emma Malabuyo (USA)	6.2	8.400	–	14.600
Silver medal	Martina Maggio (ITA)	5.7	7.900	–	13.600
Bronze medal	Helene Schaffer (GER)	5.3	8.200	–	13.500
4	Noemi Linari (ITA)	5.5	7.950	–	13.450
5	Jordan Chiles (USA)	5.9	7.400	–	13.300
6	Ana Padurariu (CAN)	6.1	6.950	-	13.050
7	Gabby Perea (USA)	5.6	7.050	–	12.650
8	Martina Basile (ITA)	5.2	7.400	-	12.600

==== Floor exercise ====
Rank	Gymnast	Difficulty	Execution	Penalty	Total
Gold medal	Trinity Thomas (USA)	5.8	8.350	–	14.150
Silver medal	Emma Malabuyo (USA)	5.5	8.100	–	13.600
Bronze medal	Martina Maggio (ITA)	5.1	8.400	–	13.500
4	Ana Padurariu (CAN)	5.3	8.050	0.1	13.250
4	Noemi Linari (ITA)	5.4	7.850	–	13.250
6	Giorgia Villa (ITA)	5.4	7.600	0.1	12.90
7	Jade Chrobok (CAN)	5.4	7.550	0.1	12.850
8	Jordan Chiles (USA)	5.5	7.300	-	12.800

== Participants ==
=== Italy ===
==== Senior ====
- Giorgia Campana
- Desiree Carofiglio
- Carlotta Ferlito
- Alessia Leolini
- Enus Mariani
- Tea Ugrin

==== Junior ====
- Giorgia Villa
- Martina Maggio
- Noemi Linari
- Maria Vittoria Cocciolo
- Asia D'Amato
- Sidney Saturnino
- Martina Basile
- Giulia Bencini
- Elisa Iorio
- Sara Berardinelli
- Giorgia Balottari

=== United States ===
The US team was as follows.

==== Senior ====
1. Gabrielle Douglas – Virginia Beach, Va. (Buckeye)
2. Emily Gaskins – Coral Springs, Fla. (Palm Beach)
3. Laurie Hernandez – Old Bridge, N.J. (MG Elite, Inc.)
4. Sydney Johnson-Scharpf – Groveland, Fla. (Brandy Johnson's)
5. Ashton Locklear – Hamlet, N.C. (Everest)
6. Aly Raisman – Needham, Mass. (Brestyan's)
7. Emily Schild – Huntersville, N.C. (Everest)
8. MyKayla Skinner – Gilbert, Ariz. (Desert Lights)
9. Ragan Smith – Lewisville, Texas (Texas Dreams)

==== Junior ====
1. Jordan Chiles – Vancouver, Wash. (Naydenov)
2. Emma Malabuyo – Flower Mound, Texas (Texas Dreams)
3. Gabrielle Perea – Geneva, Ill. (Legacy Elite)
4. Trinity Thomas – York, Pa. (Prestige)

=== Brazil ===
==== Seniors ====
The Brazil senior team was as follows.

1. Rebeca Andrade
2. Jade Barbosa
3. Daniele Hypólito
4. Lorrane Oliveira
5. Flávia Saraiva

=== France ===
- Marine Brevet
- Anne Kuhm
- Louise Vanhille
- Loan His
- Camille Bahl
- Marine Boyer
- Oreane Lechenault

=== Canada ===
- Ana Padurariu
- Jade Chrobok

=== Germany ===
- Helene Schaffer
- Lisa Schoniger

=== Slovenia ===
- Lucija Hribar
- Pia Hribar
- Lara Crnjac

=== Finland ===
- Enni Kuttenen
- Tira Kuitunen
- Emilia Kemppi
