= Lepine =

Lépine may refer to:

== Places ==
- Lépine, Pas-de-Calais
- Lepine, Saskatchewan

== People ==
- Alfred Lépine (1901–1955), Canadian ice hockey player
- Ambroise-Dydime Lépine (1840–1923), Canadian aboriginal leader
- Hector Lepine (born 1897), Canadian ice hockey player
- Jean-Antoine Lépine (1720–1814), French clock- and watch-maker
- Louis Lépine (1846–1933), French lawyer, politician, and inventor who created the Concours Lépine.
- Marc Lépine (1964–1989), Canadian mass-murderer
- Nate Lepine, (born 1973), American musician, see Manishevitz
- Pete LePine (1876–1949), Canadian-born baseball player
- Raphaël Lépine (1840–1919), French physiologist and brother of Louis Lépine
- Stanislas Lépine (1835–1932), Russian-French painter
- Eddy De Lépine (born 1984), French sprinter
- René Lépine (1929–2012), Canadian businessman

== See also ==
- Lepin (disambiguation)
- L'Épine (disambiguation)
- Concours Lépine, a French annual contest for inventors
- Lepinja (plural on Serbo-Croatian: lepinje), flatbread in Balkans
