= Loan His =

French artistic gymnast

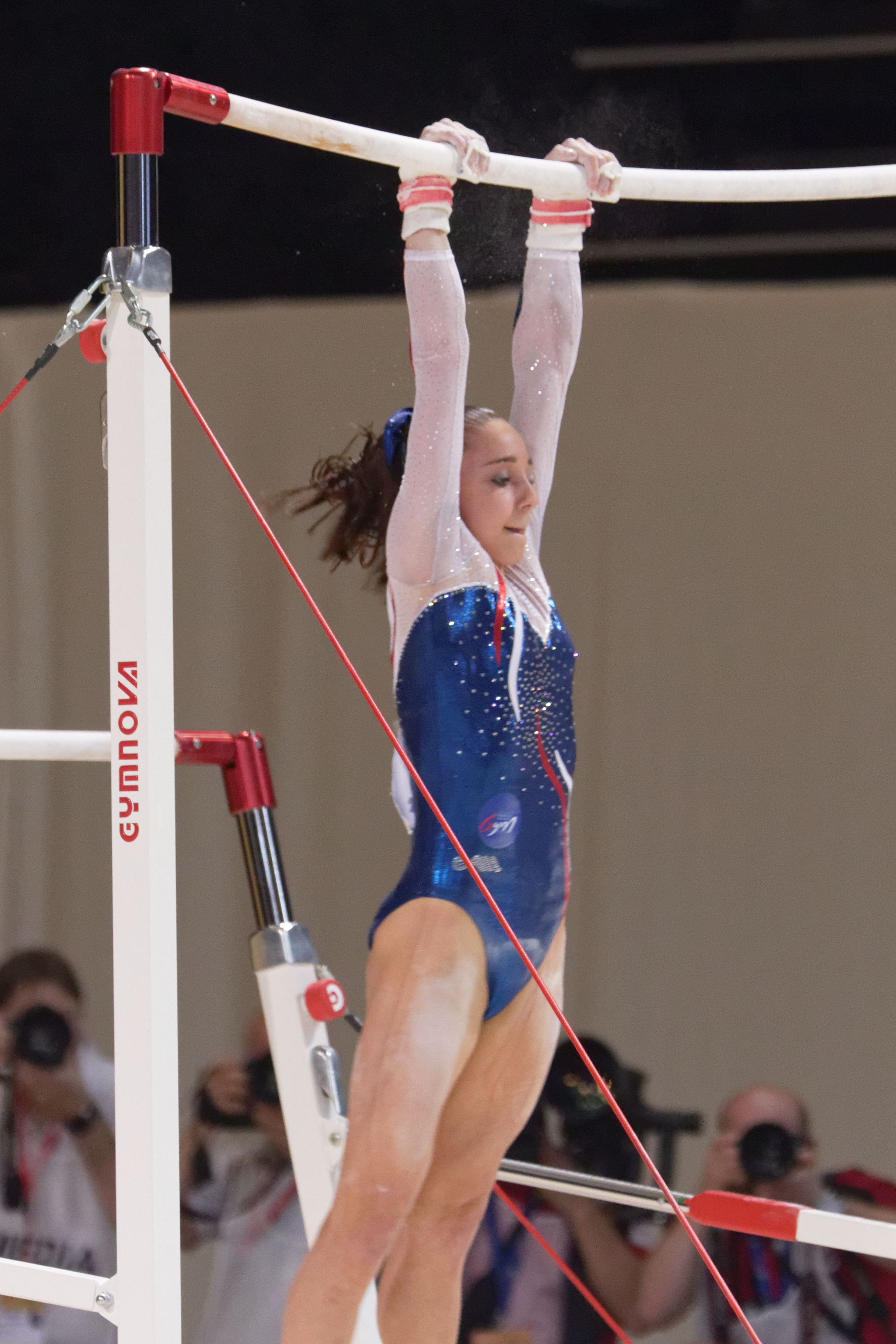
- His on the uneven bars at the 2015 European Championships.

Personal information
- Full name: Loan Válerie His
- Nickname: Lolo
- Born: 10 April 1999 (age 27) Nantes, France
- Height: 1.60 m (5 ft 3 in)

Gymnastics career
- Discipline: Women's artistic gymnastics
- Country represented: France; (2011-2016 (FRA))
- Club: Saint-Denis Gym Réunion
- Head coaches: Céline and Eric Boucharin
- Retired: 2018
Medal record
Representing France
European Championships
Bronze medal – third place	2016 Bern	Team

Loan Válerie His (born 10 April 1999) is a retired French artistic gymnast. She represented France at the 2016 Summer Olympics and helped the French team finish eleventh. She won a bronze medal with the French team at the 2016 European Championships. She also competed at the 2015 World Championships.

== Junior career ==
His made her international debut at the 2011 Elite Gym Massilia. She competed with the French National Espoir Team, and they placed tenth. She won the gold medal in the all-around at the 2012 French Espoir Championships.

=== 2013 ===
His competed at the International Gymnix in Montreal and finished fourth on the uneven bars. Then at the French Championships, she finished fourth in the junior all-around, and she won the bronze medal on the uneven bars and the silver medal on the floor exercise. She competed at the Gymnasiade, and she won the silver medal on the uneven bars behind Hungarian gymnast Noémi Makra. She also placed fifth on the balance beam.

=== 2014 ===
At the French Championships, His won the gold medal in the junior all-around, and her Saint-Denis club team finished fifth. She then competed at the Beaumont en Véron Friendly- a friendly meet between France, Belgium, and Romania. The French junior team finished third, and His won the silver medal in the all-around behind Romanian gymnast Andreea Iridon. She was selected to compete at the Junior European Championships alongside Marine Boyer, Camille Bahl, Océane Pause, and Juliette Bossu, and the team finished seventh. In the all-around final, His finished eighth with a total score of 53.898. She also finished eighth in the uneven bars final. She was initially selected to represent France at the 2014 Summer Youth Olympics; however, she withdrew due to an injury and was replaced by Camille Bahl.

== Senior career ==
=== 2015 ===
His made her senior debut at the French Championships where she won the gold medal in the all-around and on the floor exercise. She then made her senior international debut at the City of Jesolo Trophy, and the French team finished fourth. Individually, she finished eighteenth in the all-around and seventh in the uneven bars event final. She was then selected to compete at the European Championships where she finished eleventh in the all-around and eighth on the uneven bars.

In September, His competed at the Romania-France Friendly where the French team finished second, and His finished sixth in the all-around. She then went to the France-Spain Friendly and helped the French team win the gold medal. She was then selected to compete at the World Championships alongside Marine Brevet, Anne Kuhm, Claire Martin, Valentine Pikul, and Louise Vanhille, and they finished tenth during the qualification round and qualified for the 2016 Olympic Test Event. After the World Championships, she competed at the Elite Gym Massilia and her team won the gold medal. She finished ninth in the all-around and sixth on the uneven bars.

=== 2016 ===
His only competed on the uneven bars at the WOGA Classic, and she won the silver medal behind Madison Kocian. She then went to the City of Jesolo Trophy where the French team finished fourth. His finished seventeenth in the all-around and fifth on vault, and she won the bronze medal on the uneven bars behind Ashton Locklear and Gabby Douglas. She was selected to compete at the Olympic Test Event with Marine Boyer, Marine Brevet, Anne Kuhm, Oréane Lechenault, and Louise Vanhille, and they finished fourth and qualified for a team spot for the 2016 Olympic Games. His qualified for the uneven bars final where she finished fourth.

His then competed at the European Championships alongside Oréane Léchenault, Marine Boyer, Marine Brevet, and Alison Lepin, and they won the team bronze medal behind Russia and Great Britain. Then at the French Championships, she won the gold medal on the uneven bars. On 27 June, she was named to represent France at the 2016 Summer Olympics alongside Marine Boyer, Marine Brevet, Oréane Lechenault, and Louise Vanhille.

In preparation for the Olympics, His competed at the France-Romania Friendly, and won the gold medal on the uneven bars. She also competed at the Chemnitz Friendly and helped the French team win the silver medal behind Germany.

At the 2016 Summer Olympics, His only competed on the uneven bars, but she fell and only scored a 13.900. The French team finished eleventh during the qualification round and did not advance to the team final.

=== Post-Olympics and retirement ===
After the 2016 Olympics, His had two surgeries on her ankle. She returned to competition in 2017 at an internal test for the French national team, but she tore her ACL and meniscus on her uneven bars dismount. She announced her retirement on 13 November 2018.
