= Liepa =

Family name

Liepa is a Latvian and Lithuanian family name. The word literally means "linden tree" in both Latvian and Lithuanian. Its feminine forms in Lithuanian are: Liepienė (married woman or widow) and Liepaitė (unmarried woman). It is also common as feminine given name.

The surname may refer to:

- Māris Liepa (1936–1989), Latvian ballet dancer
- Andris Liepa (born 1962), Russian ballet star, director and producer
- Ingrid Liepa (born 1966), Canadian speed skater
- Lasma Liepa (born 1988), Latvian-born Turkish female canoeist
- Peter Liepa, Canadian computer programmer

Related surnames: Liepiņš
