= Ioana Crișan =

Romanian artistic gymnast

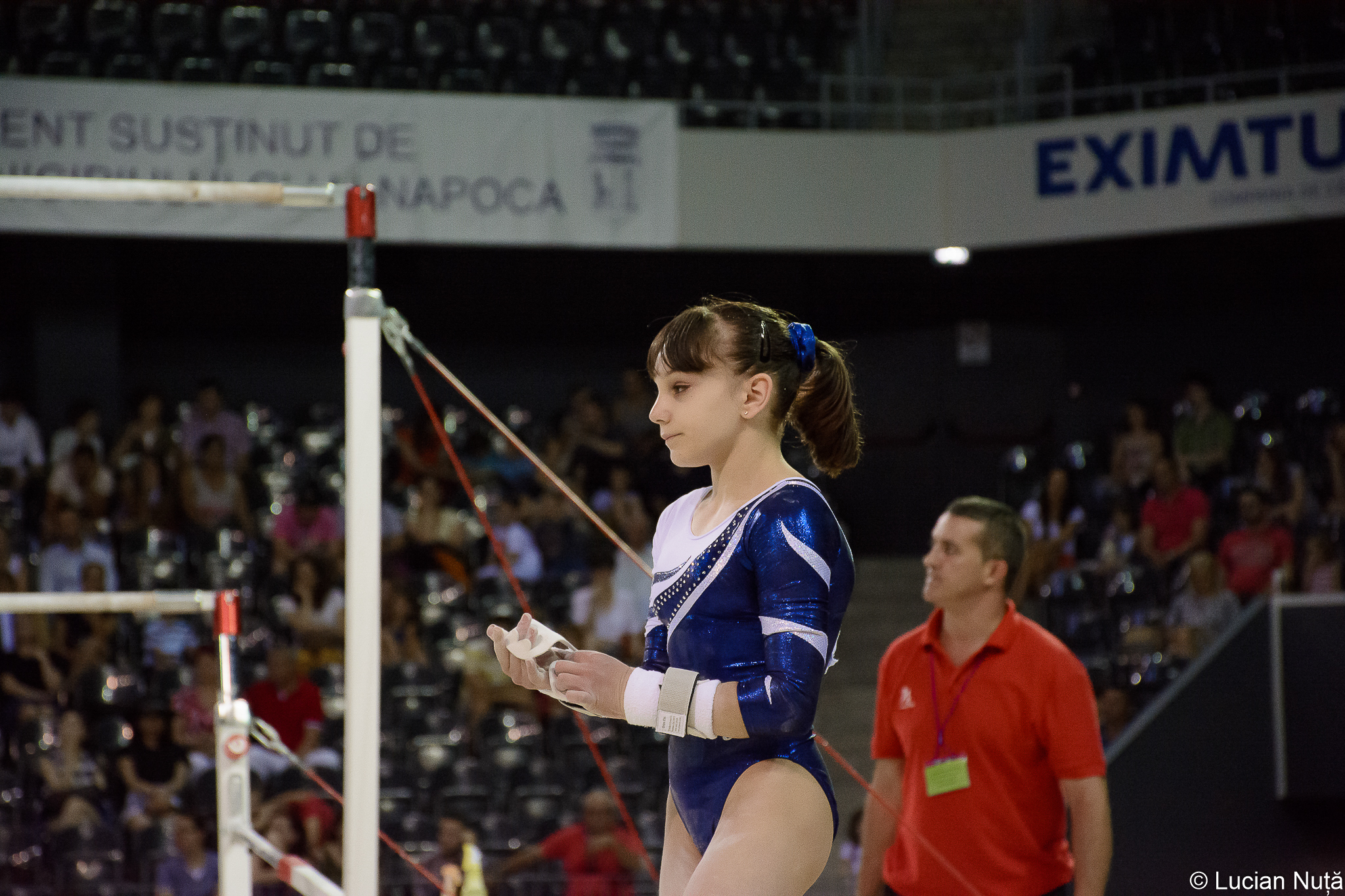
- Crișan at the 2016 Romanian Championships

Personal information
- Full name: Ioana Teodora Crișan
- Born: 15 October 2001 (age 24) Cluj-Napoca, Romania

Gymnastics career
- Discipline: Women's artistic gymnastics
- Country represented: Romania
- Club: CNS Cetate Deva

Ioana Teodora Crișan (born 15 October 2001) is a Romanian retired artistic gymnast. She competed at the 2017, 2018, and 2019 World Championships. Earlier in her career, she won a team bronze medal at the 2016 Junior European Championships.

== Gymnastics career ==
=== Junior ===
Crișan won the all-around bronze medal at the 2014 Top Gym Tournament. She competed with the Romanian team that finished fourth at the 2015 European Youth Olympic Festival, and she placed sixth in the all-around.

Crișan helped the Romanian team win the bronze medal at the 2016 Junior European Championships. Individually, she finished ninth in the all-around. She also qualified for the balance beam final, but she injured her shoulder and was unable to finish her routine, finishing last. She won the all-around silver medal at the 2016 Romanian Championships and also won silver on the vault and bronze on the floor exercise. She then won a silver medal with the Romanian team at the 2016 Gymnasiade, and she also won the all-around bronze medal.

=== Senior ===
Crișan made her senior international debut at the 2017 Sainté Gym Cup, competing only on the uneven bars and balance beam. She fell off the balance beam on her acrobatic series but hit a clean uneven bars routine. She then competed at the 2017 European Championships and advanced to the all-around final, finishing 18th. She won the all-around bronze medal at the 2017 Romanian Championships, behind Larisa Iordache and Denisa Golgotă. At the 2017 World Championships, she was initially the second reserve for the all-around final. However, when Ragan Smith was injured during the warm-up, Crișan was called up to compete. She ultimately finished 23rd in the final.

Crișan missed the 2018 European Championships due to an injury. At the 2018 Romanian Championships, she finished fifth in the all-around and won a silver medal on the vault. She was then selected to compete at the 2018 World Championships along with Maria Holbură, Denisa Golgotă, Carmen Ghiciuc, and Nica Ivanus where they finished 13th and qualified as a team to the 2019 World Championships.

At the 2019 Romanian Championships, Crișan placed seventh in the all-around and won a bronze medal on the vault. She competed at the World Championships with Holbură, Ghiciuc, and Golgotă where they finished 22nd in the qualification round. This is the lowest the Romanian women have ever placed as a team at the World Artistic Gymnastics Championships, and they did not qualify as a team for the 2020 Summer Olympics.

== Competitive history ==
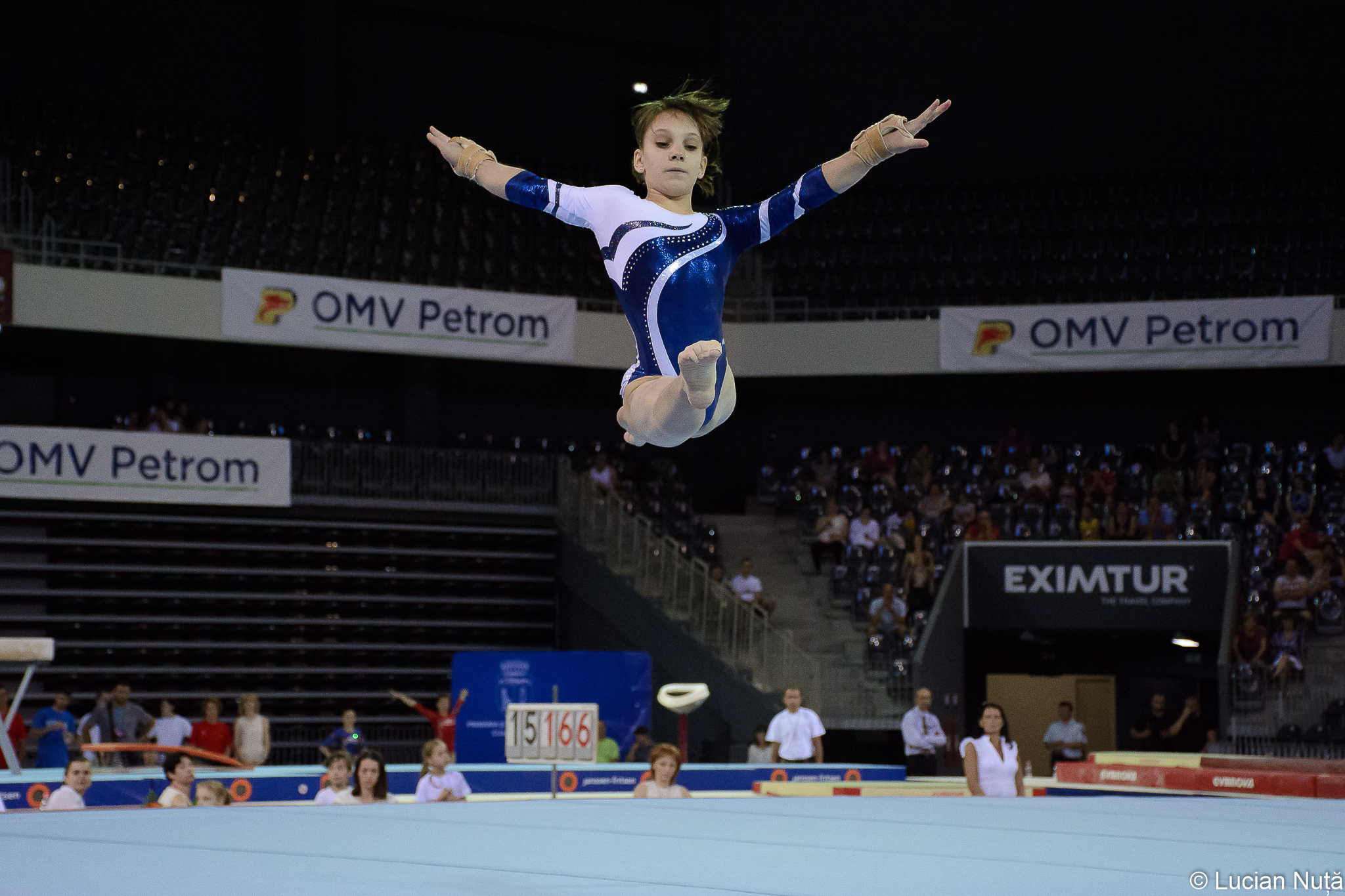
Crișan at the 2016 Romanian Championships

Competitive history of Ioana Crișan at the junior level
Year	Event	Team	AA	VT	UB	BB	FX
2014	Nadia Comaneci Invitational		2nd place, silver medalist(s)				
2014	Elite Gym Massilia	9	26				
2014	Top Gym Tournament	4	3rd place, bronze medalist(s)	7		5	
2015	European Youth Olympic Festival	4	6			6	
2016	International Gymnix	5	21				
2016	BEL-ROU Friendly	1st place, gold medalist(s)	3rd place, bronze medalist(s)				
2016	FRA-ROU Friendly	1st place, gold medalist(s)	2nd place, silver medalist(s)				
2016	Junior European Championships	3rd place, bronze medalist(s)	9			8	
2016	Romanian Championships		2nd place, silver medalist(s)	2nd place, silver medalist(s)	4	7	3rd place, bronze medalist(s)
2016	Gymnasiade	2nd place, silver medalist(s)	3rd place, bronze medalist(s)	2nd place, silver medalist(s)			4
2016	Junior Romanian Championships		3rd place, bronze medalist(s)	3rd place, bronze medalist(s)	2nd place, silver medalist(s)	2nd place, silver medalist(s)	4
2016	Top Gym Tournament	2nd place, silver medalist(s)		3rd place, bronze medalist(s)			

Competitive history of Ioana Crișan at the senior level
Year	Event	Team	AA	VT	UB	BB	FX
2017
2017	European Championships		18				
2017	Osijek World Challenge Cup				6	4	7
2017	Romanian Championships	1st place, gold medalist(s)	3rd place, bronze medalist(s)	2nd place, silver medalist(s)	6	8	
2017	Paris World Challenge Cup						8
2017	World Championships		23				
2018	Romanian Championships		5	2nd place, silver medalist(s)	6		4
2018	World Championships	13					
2019	Romanian Championships	2nd place, silver medalist(s)	7	3rd place, bronze medalist(s)			
2019	World Championships	22					
