= Alison Lepin =

French artistic gymnast

- Full name: Alison Camille Chantal Lepin
- Born: 22 June 2000 (age 26) Romorantin-Lanthenay

Gymnastics career
- Discipline: Women's artistic gymnastics
- Country represented: France (2014-2018)
- Club: Avoine Beaumont Gymnastics
- Head coaches: Marc and Gina Chirilcenco
- Retired: 2020
Medal record
Representing France
European Championships
Bronze medal – third place	2016 Bern	Team

Alison Camille Chantal Lepin (born 22 June 2000) is a French artistic gymnast. She was a member of the team that won a bronze medal at the 2016 European Championships.

== Early life ==
Lepin began gymnastics at the age of 9 at a club in Romorantin after doing figure skating. At the age of 11, Alison joined Avoine Beaumont Gymnastics. In 2012, Lepin won the French 12 year old Championships, a title that allowed her to begin competing in elite gymnastics.

== Gymnastics career ==
=== Junior ===
Lepin competed at the 2014 French National Championships and finished fifteenth in the all-around. She was selected to compete for the French national team for the first time in November 2014, for a friendly match against Italy and Mexico. Less than a year later, Lepin competed at both Massilia and Top Gym for France. She won gold on uneven bars at Top Gym.

=== Senior ===
In 2016, she competed at her first major international competition: the 2016 European Championships, in Bern, Switzerland. She helped France win the team bronze medal along with Marine Brevet, Loan His, Marine Boyer and Oréane Lechenault. This was significant for France as they had not been on a European team podium since 2008. She then competed at the 2016 National Championships where she finished seventh in the all-around and fifth on vault. Although she was the favorite to win uneven bars, she fell in the final and finished last. She was not selected for the 2016 Olympic team.

Lepin competed at the 2017 European Championships, but she did not qualify for any finals. At the end of 2017, Lepin had back surgery that kept her out of competition for a year. She was take off the national team, so she left the national training center and began training in Orléans. She came back in December 2018 for the second competition of the Top 12 Series where she scored a 12.500 on uneven bars, but, in February 2019, at the third competition, she fell on her first release and only scored an 11.700. Throughout 2019, she competed domestically, but she only competed on the uneven bars and was not added back to the French national team. She retired from gymnastics in 2020.
