= Phoebe Jakubczyk =

English gymnast

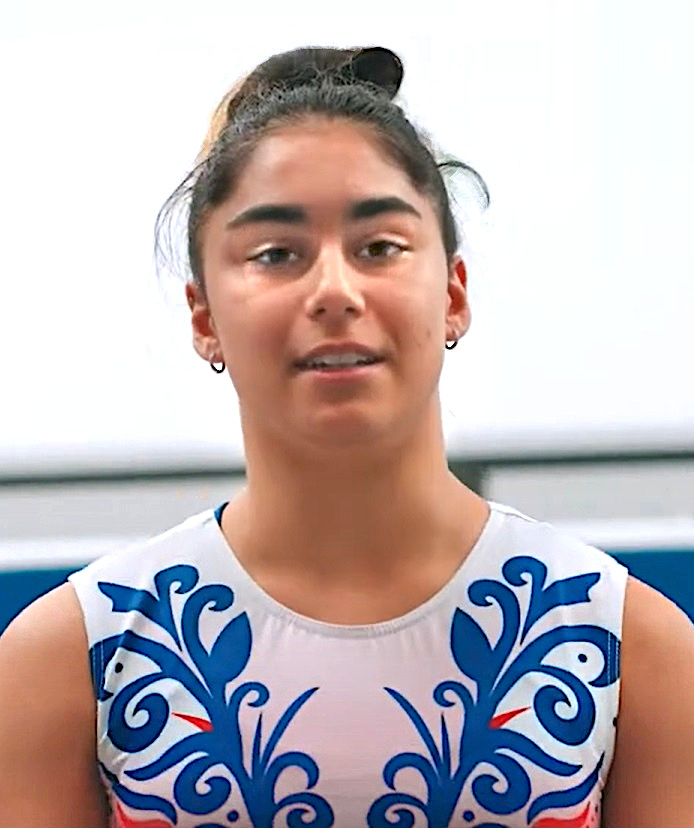
- Jakubczyk in 2021

Personal information
- Born: 26 August 2003 (age 23) Bristol, United Kingdom

Gymnastics career
- Discipline: Women's artistic gymnastics
- Country represented: (United Kingdom) Great Britain (2018–2021)
- College team: Oregon State Beavers (2022–2025)
- Club: The Academy of Gymnastics
- Head coach: Liz Kincaid
Medal record
Representing Great Britain
FIG World Cup
Event	1st	2nd	3rd
World Challenge Cup	0	1	0

Phoebe Jakubczyk (born 26 August 2003) is a British artistic gymnast. She won a bronze medal with the British junior team at the 2018 European Championships. She won the silver medal in the uneven bars final at the 2019 Szombathely World Challenge Cup. After finishing her international elite career, she joined the Oregon State Beavers women's gymnastics team.

== Gymnastics career ==
=== Elite ===
Jakubczyk finished second to Taeja James in the junior all-around at the 2017 English Championships. At the 2017 Olympic Hopes Cup, she won the all-around silver medal behind teammate Amelie Morgan. In the event finals, she won the balance beam gold medal and the floor exercise bronze medal. At the 2018 City of Jesolo Trophy, she finished eighth in the junior all-around, vault, balance beam, and floor exercise. She competed at the 2018 Junior European Championships and won a bronze medal with the British team. Individually, she placed fifth in the all-around.

Jakubczyk became age-eligible for senior competitions in 2019. At the 2019 British Championships, she won the silver medal on the vault behind Ellie Downie. She won the silver medal on the uneven bars 2019 Szombathely World Challenge Cup, behind Caitlin Rooskrantz. She won a bronze medal at the 2019 Toyota International behind Lilia Akhaimova and Georgia Godwin.

Jakubczyk competed at the 2021 European Championships in Basel, Switzerland. She fell off the uneven bars in the qualification round and did not advance into any finals. She competed at several of the British Olympic Trials but was not selected to compete at the 2020 Summer Olympics.

=== NCAA ===
In 2017, Jakubczyk announced her commitment to join the Oregon State Beavers women's gymnastics team starting in the 2022 season. During her freshman season, she competed on the uneven bars and the balance beam and set a career-high of 9.875 on the uneven bars. She missed the 2023 season due to a torn Achilles tendon. She did not make any lineups during the 2024 season, and she retired before her senior season.

== Competitive history ==
Competitive history of Phoebe Jakubczyk at the junior level
Year	Event	Team	AA	VT	UB	BB	FX
2017	British Championships		5		7		6
2017	English Championships		2nd place, silver medalist(s)		2nd place, silver medalist(s)		2nd place, silver medalist(s)
2017	Esslingen-Berkheim Friendly	3rd place, bronze medalist(s)			2nd place, silver medalist(s)		
2017	British Team Championships		6		2nd place, silver medalist(s)		
2017	Olympic Hopes Cup		2nd place, silver medalist(s)			1st place, gold medalist(s)	3rd place, bronze medalist(s)
2017	Top Gym Tournament	2nd place, silver medalist(s)	4				
2018	English Championships		3rd place, bronze medalist(s)	2nd place, silver medalist(s)	1st place, gold medalist(s)		2nd place, silver medalist(s)
2018	British Championships		4	4	2nd place, silver medalist(s)		2nd place, silver medalist(s)
2018	City of Jesolo Trophy	4	8	8		8	8
2018	Youth Olympic Games Qualifier		10				
2018	Pieve di Soligo Friendly	3rd place, bronze medalist(s)	17				
2018	European Championships	3rd place, bronze medalist(s)	5				
2018	British Team Championships	1st place, gold medalist(s)	3rd place, bronze medalist(s)	3rd place, bronze medalist(s)			

Competitive history of Phoebe Jakubczyk at the senior level
Year	Event	Team	AA	VT	UB	BB	FX
2019	English Championships		5				2nd place, silver medalist(s)
2019	British Championships		9	2nd place, silver medalist(s)	8	8	
2019	Szombathely World Challenge Cup				2nd place, silver medalist(s)	8	8
2019	British Team Championships	1st place, gold medalist(s)	3rd place, bronze medalist(s)		3rd place, bronze medalist(s)		3rd place, bronze medalist(s)
2019	3rd Bundesliga	3rd place, bronze medalist(s)	4	2nd place, silver medalist(s)	3rd place, bronze medalist(s)		2nd place, silver medalist(s)
2019	4th Bundesliga	4	4	2nd place, silver medalist(s)			
2019	Elite Gym Massilia		13		3rd place, bronze medalist(s)		4
2019	Bundesliga Final	4	5				3rd place, bronze medalist(s)
2019	Toyota International				7	9	3rd place, bronze medalist(s)
2021
2021	European Championships		28				
