= Oréane Lechenault =

French artistic gymnast

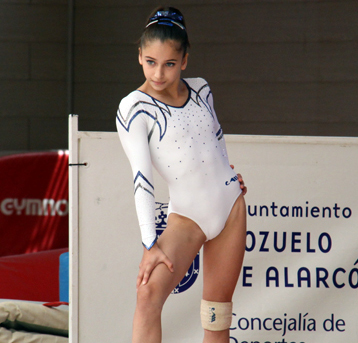
- Lechenault in 2015.

Personal information
- Full name: Oréane Caroline Marie Lechenault
- Nickname: Oré
- Born: 31 August 2000 (age 26) Les Lilas, Paris, France
- Height: 1.44 m (4 ft 9 in)

Gymnastics career
- Discipline: Women's artistic gymnastics
- Country represented: France; (2012-2020 (France))
- Club: Pôle Espoir de Toulon
- Head coaches: Céline and Eric Boucharin
- Retired: 2020
Medal record
Women's artistic gymnastics
Representing France
European Championships
Bronze medal – third place	2016 Bern	Team

Oréane Caroline Marie Lechenault (born 31 August 2000) is a retired French female artistic gymnast. She finished fourth alongside her teammates at the 2016 Gymnastics Olympic Test Event in Rio de Janeiro, and she represented France at the 2016 Summer Olympics. She won a bronze medal in the team final at the 2016 European Championships.

== Career ==
=== Junior career: 2013-2015 ===
Lechenault made her international debut at the 2012 Elite Gym Massilia in Marseilles where she won the team silver medal and placed fifth in the all-around. She competed at the 2013 International Gymnix in Montreal where she finished eleventh in the all-around and seventh on the floor exercise. At the 2014 French Championships, she only competed on the balance beam, and her team, Association Sportive et Culturelle, placed tenth. At the 2014 Elite Gym Massilia, she was a member of the French team that finished eighth in the open division.

Lechenault placed sixth in the all-around and fourth on the balance beam at the 2015 French Championships. Then at the Flanders Team Challenge, she competed on a mixed team with athletes from the Netherlands and Sweden, and they finished eighth. At the Elite Gym Massilia, she won the bronze medal on the uneven bars behind Natalia Kapitonova and Enus Mariani. Then at the Top Gym Tournament, she won the bronze medal on the uneven bars and the silver medal on the balance beam.

=== Senior career ===
==== 2016 ====
Lechenault made her senior debut at the 2016 WOGA Classic where she won the silver medal on the balance beam behind Madison Kocian. Then at the 2016 City of Jesolo Trophy, the French team finished fourth. She was then selected to compete at the 2016 Olympic Test Event with Marine Boyer, Marine Brevet, Loan His, Anne Kuhm, and Louise Vanhille. The team finished fourth and qualified for the final team spot for the 2016 Olympics. She then competed at the European Championships with Boyer, Brevet, His, and Alison Lepin, and they won the bronze medal behind Russia and Great Britain. She finished sixth in the all-around at the French Championships and won the bronze medal on the floor exercise. Then at the Chemnitz Friendly, the French team won the silver medal, and Lechenault finished eleventh in the all-around.

Lechenault was selected to represent France at the 2016 Summer Olympics alongside Marine Boyer, Marine Brevet, Loan His, and Louise Vanhille. In the qualification round, the French team finished eleventh, and Lechenault placed forty-sixth in the all-around.

==== 2017-2020 ====
At the 2017 French Championships, Lechenault placed tenth in the all-around and won the silver medal on the vault. At the 2018 French Championships, she only competed on the uneven bars and did not qualify for the event final. Lechenault retired in April 2020 due to injuries.
