= 2016 European Women's Artistic Gymnastics Championships =

31st European Championships in Women's Artistic Gymnastics Seniors and Juniors
- Venue: PostFinance-Arena
- Location: Bern, Switzerland
- Dates: 1 to 5 June 2016
- Nations: Members of the European Union of Gymnastics

The 31st European Championships in Women's Artistic Gymnastics Seniors and Juniors was held from 1 to 5 June 2016, at the PostFinance-Arena in Bern, Switzerland. It was the first time the city had hosted a major female international competition (it hosted the 1975 Men's European Gymnastics Championships), and was the first time Switzerland hosted the competition in the country.

== Venue ==
The competition was held at the PostFinance-Arena. Formerly the Bern Arena, it houses the home games of National League A ice hockey team SC Bern. Built in 1967, the arena has a capacity of just over 17,000 spectators – this makes it one of the largest arenas to host the competition.

== Schedule ==
Date	Time (CET)	Event
1 June	10:00 – 20:15	Qualifications Juniors
2 June	10:00 – 19:30	Qualifications Seniors
3 June	19:00 – 21:10	Individual All-Around Juniors
4 June	15.00 – 17.15	Team Final Seniors
5 June	11:00 – 17:00	Apparatus Finals (Both)

== Television broadcasters ==
- Europe – UEG
- Switzerland – SRG SSR
- United Kingdom – BBC

== Medal summary ==
=== Medalists ===
Event	Gold	Silver	Bronze
Seniors
Team	Russia; Ksenia Afanasyeva; Angelina Melnikova; Aliya Mustafina; Daria Spiridonova; Seda Tutkhalyan	(United Kingdom) Great Britain; Becky Downie; Ellie Downie; Claudia Fragapane; Ruby Harrold; Gabrielle Jupp	France; Marine Boyer; Marine Brevet; Loan His; Oréane Léchenault; Alison Lepin
Vault	(Switzerland) Giulia Steingruber	(United Kingdom) Ellie Downie	(Russia) Ksenia Afanasyeva
Uneven bars	(United Kingdom) Becky Downie	(Russia) Daria Spiridonova	(Russia) Aliya Mustafina
Balance beam	(Russia) Aliya Mustafina	(France) Marine Boyer	(Romania) Cătălina Ponor
Floor	(Switzerland) Giulia Steingruber	(United Kingdom) Ellie Downie	(Romania) Cătălina Ponor
Juniors
Team	Russia; Elena Eremina; Anastasia Ilyankova; Uliana Perebinosova; Angelina Simakova; Varvara Zubova	(United Kingdom) Great Britain; Taeja James; Alice Kinsella; Maisie Methuen; Megan Parker; Lucy Stanhope	Romania; Alisia Botnaru; Olivia Cîmpian; Ioana Crișan; Carmen Ghiciuc; Denisa Golgotă
All-around	(Russia) Elena Eremina	(Switzerland) Lynn Genhart	(Italy) Martina Basile
Vault	(Italy) Martina Maggio	(Italy) Martina Basile (Romania) Denisa Golgotă	None Awarded
Uneven bars	(Russia) Anastasia Ilyankova	(Russia) Uliana Perebinosova	(France) Lorette Charpy
Balance beam	(Russia) Anastasia Ilyankova	(United Kingdom) Alice Kinsella	(Russia) Elena Eremina
Floor	(Romania) Denisa Golgotă	(United Kingdom) Alice Kinsella	(Russia) Uliana Perebinosova

=== Medal table ===
==== Combined ====
Rank	Nation	Gold	Silver	Bronze	Total
1	Russia (RUS)	6	2	4	12
2	Switzerland (SUI)	2	1	0	3
3	Great Britain (GBR)	1	6	0	7
4	Romania (ROU)	1	1	3	5
5	Italy (ITA)	1	1	1	3
6	France (FRA)	0	1	2	3
Totals (6 entries)		11	12	10	33

==== Seniors ====
Rank	Nation	Gold	Silver	Bronze	Total
1	Russia (RUS)	2	1	2	5
2	Switzerland (SUI)	2	0	0	2
3	Great Britain (GBR)	1	3	0	4
4	France (FRA)	0	1	1	2
5	Romania (ROU)	0	0	2	2
Totals (5 entries)		5	5	5	15

==== Juniors ====
Rank	Nation	Gold	Silver	Bronze	Total
1	Russia (RUS)	4	1	2	7
2	Italy (ITA)	1	1	1	3
2	Romania (ROU)	1	1	1	3
4	Great Britain (GBR)	0	3	0	3
5	Switzerland (SUI)	0	1	0	1
6	France (FRA)	0	0	1	1
Totals (6 entries)		6	7	5	18

== Results ==
=== Seniors ===
==== Team ====
Oldest and youngest competitors

	Name	Country	Date of birth	Age
Youngest	Lina Philipp	Germany	18 September 2000	15 years, 8 months and 17 days
Oldest	Cătălina Ponor	Romania	20 August 1987	28 years, 9 months and 15 days

Rank	Team	Vault (gymnastics)	Uneven bars	Balance beam	Floor (gymnastics)	Total
1st place, gold medalist(s)	Russia	44.715 (1)	45.665 (1)	43.233 (1)	41.599 (2)	175.212
1st place, gold medalist(s)	Angelina Melnikova	14.866	14.966	14.800	14.133	175.212
1st place, gold medalist(s)	Aliya Mustafina		15.333	14.800	13.466	175.212
1st place, gold medalist(s)	Seda Tutkhalyan	14.966		13.633	14.000	175.212
1st place, gold medalist(s)	Daria Spiridonova		15.366			175.212
1st place, gold medalist(s)	Ksenia Afanasyeva	14.916				175.212
2nd place, silver medalist(s)	Great Britain	44.599 (2)	42.615 (4)	39.899 (6)	43.199 (1)	170.312
2nd place, silver medalist(s)	Claudia Fragapane	14.733		13.266	14.833	170.312
2nd place, silver medalist(s)	Ruby Harrold	14.766	13.166		13.933	170.312
2nd place, silver medalist(s)	Ellie Downie	15.100			14.433	170.312
2nd place, silver medalist(s)	Gabrielle Jupp		14.383	14.100		170.312
2nd place, silver medalist(s)	Becky Downie		15.066	12.533		170.312
3rd place, bronze medalist(s)	France	42.799 (6)	43.499 (2)	40.866 (3)	41.332 (5)	168.496
3rd place, bronze medalist(s)	Oréane Léchenault	13.900	14.266	12.800	13.666	168.496
3rd place, bronze medalist(s)	Marine Boyer	14.733		14.333	13.900	168.496
3rd place, bronze medalist(s)	Marine Brevet	14.166		13.733	13.766	168.496
3rd place, bronze medalist(s)	Loan His		14.633			168.496
3rd place, bronze medalist(s)	Alison Lepin		14.600			168.496
4	Switzerland	43.291 (5)	40.099 (7)	40.766 (4)	41.565 (3)	165.721
4	Giulia Steingruber	15.591	14.133	12.900	15.033	165.721
4	Ilaria Käslin	13.700	12.533	14.333	13.766	165.721
4	Caterina Barloggio			13.533	12.766	165.721
4	Thea Brogli	14.000				165.721
4	Stefanie Siegenthaler		13.433			165.721
5	Italy	43.540 (4)	40.665 (6)	41.433 (2)	39.933 (7)	165.571
5	Elisa Meneghini	14.266		14.500	13.700	165.571
5	Lara Mori		13.933	13.200	13.733	165.571
5	Enus Mariani		14.166	13.733	12.500	165.571
5	Martina Rizzelli	14.491	12.566			165.571
5	Sofia Busato	14.783				165.571
6	Romania	43.565 (3)	39.066 (8)	40.500 (5)	41.465 (4)	164.596
6	Maria Holbură	13.733	13.100	12.900	13.633	164.596
6	Cătălina Ponor	15.066		14.600	14.566	164.596
6	Anamaria Ocolișan	14.766	12.733		13.266	164.596
6	Anda Butuc		13.233	13.000		164.596
6	Silvia Zarzu					164.596
7	Germany	41.265 (8)	43.399 (3)	38.599 (7)	40.566 (6)	163.829
7	Kim Bùi	14.033	14.866	13.466	13.666	163.829
7	Lina Philipp	13.966	14.333		13.400	163.829
7	Maike Enderle		14.200	12.633		163.829
7	Sarah Voss	13.266		12.500		163.829
7	Amélie Föllinger				13.500	163.829
8	Hungary	42.748 (7)	41.866 (5)	38.416 (8)	39.732 (8)	162.762
8	Zsófia Kovács	14.966	14.500	12.900	13.400	162.762
8	Dorina Böczögő	14.016	13.333	12.983	13.466	162.762
8	Luca Divéky	13.766		12.533	12.866	162.762
8	Noémi Makra		14.033			162.762
8	Júlianna Csányi					162.762

==== Vault ====
Oldest and youngest competitors

	Name	Country	Date of birth	Age
Youngest	Sofia Busato	Italy	4 September 2000	15 years, 9 months and 1 day
Oldest	Ksenia Afanasyeva	Russia	13 September 1991	24 years, 8 months and 23 days

Rank	Gymnast	D Score	E Score	Pen.	Score 1	D Score	E Score	Pen.	Score 2	Total
1st place, gold medalist(s)	(Switzerland) Giulia Steingruber	6.200	9.300		15.500	5.800	8.766	-0.1	14.466	14.983
2nd place, silver medalist(s)	(United Kingdom) Ellie Downie	5.800	9.266		15.066	5.600	9.200		14.800	14.933
3rd place, bronze medalist(s)	(Russia) Ksenia Afanasyeva	5.800	9.066		14.866	5.600	8.933		14.533	14.699
4	(Italy) Sofia Busato	5.800	9.066		14.866	5.400	8.933		14.333	14.599
5	(United Kingdom) Claudia Fragapane	5.800	9.133		14.933	5.600	8.666	-0.1	14.166	14.549
6	(Slovenia) Teja Belak	5.800	8.866		14.666	5.300	9.000		14.300	14.483
7	(Hungary) Zsófia Kovács	5.800	9.133		14.933	4.600	8.900		13.500	14.216
8	(Poland) Katarzyna Jurkowska-Kowalska	5.400	9.000		14.400	5.200	7.800		13.000	13.700

==== Uneven bars ====
Oldest and youngest competitors

	Name	Country	Date of birth	Age
Youngest	Zsófia Kovács	Hungary	6 April 2000	16 years, 1 month and 30 days
Oldest	Kim Bui	Germany	20 January 1989	27 years, 4 months and 16 days

Position	Gymnast	D Score	E Score	Penalty	Total
1st place, gold medalist(s)	(United Kingdom) Becky Downie	6.900	8.600		15.500
2nd place, silver medalist(s)	(Russia) Daria Spiridonova	6.700	8.766		15.466
3rd place, bronze medalist(s)	(Russia) Aliya Mustafina	6.300	8.800		15.100
4	(Germany) Kim Bùi	6.200	8.333		14.533
5	(Hungary) Zsófia Kovács	5.900	8.500		14.400
6	(Switzerland) Giulia Steingruber	5.800	8.366		14.166
7	(United Kingdom) Gabrielle Jupp	6.100	7.300		13.400
8	(Italy) Martina Rizzelli	6.200	7.166		13.366

==== Balance beam ====
Oldest and youngest competitors

	Name	Country	Date of birth	Age
Youngest	Angelina Melnikova	Russia	18 July 2000	15 years, 10 months and 18 days
Oldest	Cătălina Ponor	Romania	20 August 1987	28 years, 9 months and 16 days

Position	Gymnast	D Score	E Score	Penalty	Total
1st place, gold medalist(s)	(Russia) Aliya Mustafina	6.300	8.800		15.100
2nd place, silver medalist(s)	(France) Marine Boyer	6.300	8.300		14.600
3rd place, bronze medalist(s)	(Romania) Cătălina Ponor	5.900	8.466	-0.1	14.266
4	(Switzerland) Ilaria Käslin	5.600	8.733	-0.1	14.233
5	(Russia) Angelina Melnikova	6.000	8.166		14.166
6	(France) Marine Brevet	5.600	8.466		14.066
6	(Belgium) Gaelle Mys	5.800	8.266		14.066
6	(United Kingdom) Becky Downie	6.100	7.966		14.066

==== Floor ====
Oldest and youngest competitors

	Name	Country	Date of birth	Age
Youngest	Amélie Föllinger	Germany	8 June 2000	15 years, 11 months and 28 days
Oldest	Cătălina Ponor	Romania	20 August 1987	28 years, 9 months and 16 days

Position	Gymnast	D Score	E Score	Penalty	Total
1st place, gold medalist(s)	(Switzerland) Giulia Steingruber	6.400	8.800		15.200
2nd place, silver medalist(s)	(United Kingdom) Ellie Downie	6.100	8.466		14.566
3rd place, bronze medalist(s)	(Romania) Cătălina Ponor	6.000	8.466		14.466
4	(United Kingdom) Claudia Fragapane	6.500	7.800		14.300
5	(Netherlands) Mara Titarsolej	5.500	8.433		13.933
6	(France) Marine Brevet	5.200	8.800	-0.1	13.900
7	(Belgium) Gaelle Mys	5.400	8.266		13.666
8	(Germany) Amélie Föllinger	5.600	7.866		13.466

==== Qualification ====
===== Team =====
Rank	Team	Vault (gymnastics)	Uneven bars	Balance beam	Floor (gymnastics)	Total
1	Great Britain	44.566 (1)	43.632 (2)	41.699 (3)	43.466 (1)	173.363
1	Claudia Fragapane	14.733		13.366	15.000	173.363
1	Ruby Harrold	14.800	14.033		14.200	173.363
1	Becky Downie		15.033	14.333		173.363
1	Ellie Downie	15.033			14.266	173.363
1	Gabrielle Jupp		14.566	14.000		173.363
2	Russia	44.565 (2)	44.798 (1)	43.066 (1)	40.832 (4)	173.261
2	Angelina Melnikova	14.833	14.866	14.500	13.533	173.261
2	Aliya Mustafina		15.166	14.733	13.533	173.261
2	Seda Tutkhalyan	14.766		13.833	13.766	173.261
2	Ksenia Afanasyeva	14.966				173.261
2	Daria Spiridonova		14.766			173.261
3	Switzerland	43.598 (3)	41.166 (4)	39.698 (8)	41.666 (2)	166.128
3	Giulia Steingruber	15.666	14.033	12.666	14.966	166.128
3	Ilaria Käslin	13.966	13.500	14.266	13.700	166.128
3	Caterina Barloggio			12.766	13.000	166.128
3	Thea Brogli	13.966				166.128
3	Stefanie Siegenthaler		13.633			166.128
4	Romania	43.407 (4)	39.032 (9)	41.499 (4)	40.932 (3)	164.870
4	Cătălina Ponor	15.141		14.433	14.566	164.870
4	Maria Holbură		13.333	13.700	13.633	164.870
4	Anamaria Ocolișan	14.666	12.566			164.870
4	Anda Butuc		13.133	13.366		164.870
4	Silvia Zarzu	13.600			12.733	164.870
5	Germany	42.565 (9)	41.598 (3)	40.657 (6)	40.032 (5)	164.852
5	Kim Bùi	13.966	14.566	13.566	13.633	164.852
5	Lina Philipp	14.166	13.066		12.533	164.852
5	Sarah Voss	14.433		13.633		164.852
5	Maike Enderle		13.966	13.458		164.852
5	Amélie Föllinger				13.866	164.852
6	France	42.641 (7)	38.299 (10)	41.966 (2)	39.933 (7)	162.839
6	Oréane Léchenault	13.700	14.033	13.400	12.533	162.839
6	Marine Boyer	14.700		14.200	13.600	162.839
6	Marine Brevet	14.241		14.366	13.800	162.839
6	Loan His		13.200			162.839
6	Alison Lepin		11.066			162.839
7	Italy	43.399 (5)	40.765 (5)	39.032 (9)	38.932 (10)	162.128
7	Elisa Meneghini	14.233		13.433	13.033	162.128
7	Lara Mori		13.666	12.633	13.633	162.128
7	Enus Mariani		12.933	12.966	12.266	162.128
7	Martina Rizzelli	14.366	14.166			162.128
7	Sofia Busato	14.800				162.128
8	Hungary	42.899 (6)	39.933 (7)	39.699 (7)	39.432 (9)	161.963
8	Zsófia Kovács	15.133	14.200	13.433	13.666	161.963
8	Noémi Makra	13.733	12.700	13.233	13.266	161.963
8	Dorina Böczögő	14.033	13.033	13.033	12.500	161.963
8	Júlianna Csányi					161.963
8	Luca Divéky					161.963

===== Vault =====
Rank	Gymnast	Nation	D Score	E Score	Pen.	Score 1	D Score	E Score	Pen.	Score 2	Total	Qual.
Rank	Gymnast	Nation	Vault 1				Vault 2				Total	Qual.
1	Giulia Steingruber	Switzerland	6.200	9.466		15.666	5.800	9.400		15.200	15.433	Q
2	Ellie Downie	Great Britain	5.800	9.233		15.033	5.600	9.100		14.700	14.866	Q
3	Ksenia Afanasyeva	Russia	5.800	9.166		14.966	5.600	8.941		14.541	14.753	Q
4	Sofia Busato	Italy	5.800	9.000		14.800	5.400	8.933		14.333	14.566	Q
5	Claudia Fragapane	Great Britain	5.800	8.933		14.733	5.600	8.766		14.366	14.549	Q
6	Teja Belak	Slovenia	5.800	8.966		14.766	5.300	8.933		14.233	14.499	Q
7	Zsófia Kovács	Hungary	5.800	9.333		15.133	4.600	9.033		13.633	14.383	Q
8	Katarzyna Jurkowska-Kowalska	Poland	5.400	9.000		14.400	5.200	9.033		14.233	14.316	Q
9	Tjaša Kysselef	Slovenia	5.300	9.083		14.383	5.000	9.200		14.200	14.291	R1
10	Seda Tutkhalyan	Russia	5.800	8.966		14.766	5.600	8.500	-0.3	13.800	14.283	R2
11	Marcela Torres	Sweden	5.400	8.766		14.166	5.200	8.766	-0.1	13.866	14.016	R3

===== Uneven bars =====
Rank	Gymnast	Nation	D Score	E Score	Pen.	Total	Qual.
1	Aliya Mustafina	Russia	6.500	8.666		15.166	Q
2	Becky Downie	Great Britain	6.400	8.633		15.033	Q
3	Angelina Melnikova	Russia	6.400	8.466		14.866	Q
4	Daria Spiridonova	Russia	6.300	8.466		14.766	–
5	Gabrielle Jupp	Great Britain	6.200	8.366		14.566	Q
6	Kim Bùi	Germany	6.300	8.266		14.566	Q
7	Zsófia Kovács	Hungary	5.900	8.300		14.200	Q
8	Martina Rizzelli	Italy	6.200	7.966		14.166	Q
9	Giulia Steingruber	Switzerland	5.700	8.333		14.033	Q
10	Oréane Léchenault	France	6.300	7.733		14.033	R1
11	Ruby Harrold	Great Britain	6.600	7.433		14.033	–
12	Maike Enderle	Germany	5.800	8.166		13.966	R2
13	Mara Titarsolej	Netherlands	5.400	8.333		13.733	R3

===== Balance beam =====
Rank	Gymnast	Nation	D Score	E Score	Pen.	Total	Qual.
1	Aliya Mustafina	Russia	6.000	8.733		14.733	Q
2	Angelina Melnikova	Russia	6.100	8.400		14.500	Q
3	Cătălina Ponor	Romania	6.000	8.433		14.433	Q
4	Marine Brevet	France	5.700	8.666		14.366	Q
5	Becky Downie	Great Britain	5.800	8.533		14.333	Q
6	Ilaria Käslin	Switzerland	5.700	8.566		14.266	Q
7	Marine Boyer	France	6.100	8.100		14.200	Q
8	Gaelle Mys	Belgium	5.700	8.433		14.133	Q
9	Gabrielle Jupp	Great Britain	5.800	8.200		14.000	R1
10	Nina Derwael	Belgium	5.700	8.233		13.933	R2
11	Seda Tutkhalyan	Russia	6.300	7.533		13.833	–
12	Mara Titarsolej	Netherlands	5.600	8.233	-0.1	13.733	R3

===== Floor =====
Rank	Gymnast	Nation	D Score	E Score	Pen.	Total	Qual.
1	Claudia Fragapane	Great Britain	6.400	8.600		15.000	Q
2	Giulia Steingruber	Switzerland	6.200	8.766		14.966	Q
3	Cătălina Ponor	Romania	6.000	8.566		14.566	Q
4	Ellie Downie	Great Britain	6.000	8.366	-0.1	14.266	Q
5	Ruby Harrold	Great Britain	5.700	8.500		14.200	–
6	Mara Titarsolej	Netherlands	5.600	8.566		14.166	Q
7	Amélie Föllinger	Germany	5.800	8.066		13.866	Q
8	Marine Brevet	France	5.200	8.700	-0.1	13.800	Q
9	Gaelle Mys	Belgium	5.500	8.300		13.800	Q
10	Seda Tutkhalyan	Russia	5.700	8.066		13.766	R1
11	Ilaria Käslin	Switzerland	5.300	8.500	-0.1	13.700	R2
12	Zsófia Kovács	Hungary	5.500	8.166		13.666	R3

=== Juniors ===
==== Team ====
Oldest and youngest competitors

	Name	Country	Date of birth	Age
Youngest	Morgane Osyssek-Reimer	France	15 December 2002	13 years, 5 months and 17 days
Oldest	Alisia Botnaru	Romania	10 May 2000	16 years and 22 days

Rank	Team	Vault (gymnastics)	Uneven bars	Balance beam	Floor (gymnastics)	Total
1st place, gold medalist(s)	Russia	41.165 (7)	43.000 (1)	42.715 (1)	41.299 (1)	168.179
1st place, gold medalist(s)	Elena Eremina	14.366	14.000	14.266	14.100	168.179
1st place, gold medalist(s)	Anastasia Ilyankova	14.033	14.600	14.283	13.133	168.179
1st place, gold medalist(s)	Uliana Perebinosova	0.000	14.400	14.066	13.666	168.179
1st place, gold medalist(s)	Angelina Simakova	12.766	14.000		13.533	168.179
1st place, gold medalist(s)	Varvara Zubova			14.166		168.179
2nd place, silver medalist(s)	Great Britain	41.765 (5)	40.532 (3)	41.416 (2)	40.199 (3)	163.912
2nd place, silver medalist(s)	Taeja James	0.000	13.233	12.666	13.033	163.912
2nd place, silver medalist(s)	Alice Kinsella	13.966	13.866	14.000	13.633	163.912
2nd place, silver medalist(s)	Maisie Methuen	13.866	13.433	13.933	12.766	163.912
2nd place, silver medalist(s)	Megan Parker		12.700		13.533	163.912
2nd place, silver medalist(s)	Lucy Stanhope	13.933		13.483		163.912
3rd place, bronze medalist(s)	Romania	43.415 (1)	38.832 (8)	40.932 (3)	40.499 (2)	163.678
3rd place, bronze medalist(s)	Alisia Botnaru		11.600	13.233		163.678
3rd place, bronze medalist(s)	Olivia Cîmpian	14.566	12.900	12.400	13.633	163.678
3rd place, bronze medalist(s)	Ioana Crișan	13.833	12.966	14.133	13.433	163.678
3rd place, bronze medalist(s)	Carmen Ghiciuc	13.916	12.966	13.566	13.366	163.678
3rd place, bronze medalist(s)	Denisa Golgotă	14.933			13,433	163.678
4	Italy	43.166 (2)	39.366 (6)	39.699 (4)	39.799 (4)	162.030
4	Martina Basile	14.233	13.300	13.466	13.033	162.030
4	Sara Berardinelli		13.266	12.700		162.030
4	Maria Cocciolo	14.100		12.900	13.300	162.030
4	Francesca Linari	13.608	10.700	13.333	13.333	162.030
4	Martina Maggio	14.833	12.800		13.166	162.030
5	France	42.083 (3)	40.933 (2)	38.241 (10)	39.566 (5)	160.823
5	Lorette Charpy	13.866	14.300	14.175	12.966	160.823
5	Alisson Lapp			12.100	13.400	160.823
5	Janna Mouffok	14.100	13.500		11.700	160.823
5	Morgane Osyssek-Reimer	13.900	12.866	11.966	13.200	160.823
5	Melissa Poitreau	14.083	13.133	11.600		160.823
6	Switzerland	41.899 (4)	40.365 (4)	38.899 (8)	39.333 (6)	160.496
6	Lynn Genhart	12.900	13.466	13.633	12.600	160.496
6	Leonie Meier	13.866	13.533	12.033	12.900	160.496
6	Livia Schmid	14.000	13.200	11.800	13.233	160.496
6	Fabienne Studer					160.496
6	Anina Wildi	14.033	13.366	13.233	13.200	160.496
7	Germany	41.000 (9)	39.500 (5)	39.666 (5)	39.199 (7)	159.365
7	Emma Höfele	13.900	12.900	13.266	13.100	159.365
7	Kristina Iltner		13.000		12.933	159.365
7	Anudari Platow	13.133		11.533		159.365
7	Helene Schäfer	13.300	13.600	13.800	12.366	159.365
7	Isabelle Stingl	13.800	11.433	12.600	13.166	159.365
8	Belgium	41.132 (8)	38.932 (7)	38.932 (7)	38.632 (9)	157.628
8	Maellyse Brassart	13.766	12.566	13.166	12.766	157.628
8	Manon Muller	0.000	12.633	13.233		157.628
8	Myrthe Potoms	13.800	13.033	11.933	12.933	157.628
8	Rinke Santy	13.566	13.266	12.533	12.933	157.628
8	Dimphna Senders				12.600	157.628

==== All-around ====
Oldest and youngest competitors

	Name	Country	Date of birth	Age
Youngest	Morgane Osyssek-Reimer	France	15 December 2002	13 years, 5 months and 19 days
Oldest	Amelia Sánchez	Spain	8 January 2001	15 years, 4 months and 26 days

Rank	Gymnast	Vault (gymnastics)	Uneven bars	Balance beam	Floor (gymnastics)	Total
1st place, gold medalist(s)	Elena Eremina (RUS)	13.600	13.400	13.850	13.700	54.550
2nd place, silver medalist(s)	Lynn Genhart (SUI)	14.033	13.533	13.933	12.866	54.365
3rd place, bronze medalist(s)	Martina Basile (ITA)	14.200	13.100	13.666	13.300	54.266
4	Maisie Methuen (GBR)	14.066	12.733	13.600	13.200	53.599
5	Alice Kinsella (GBR)	13.966	13.500	12.466	13.566	53.498
6	Morgane Osyssek-Reimer (FRA)	13.900	12.900	13.366	13.166	53.332
7	Rinke Santy (BEL)	13.800	13.133	13.066	12.600	52.599
8	Carmen Ghiciuc (ROU)	14.041	12.100	13.366	13.000	52.507
9	Ioana Crișan (ROU)	14.033	11.466	13.966	13.033	52.498
10	Anastasia Ilyankova (RUS)	13.000	14.300	11.700	13.433	52.433
11	Francesca Linari (ITA)	14.241	11.933	13.066	13.133	52.373
12	Lorette Charpy (FRA)	13.700	13.033	12.600	12.966	52.299
13	Anina Wildi (SUI)	14.100	12.966	12.266	12.700	52.032
14	Maellyse Brassart (BEL)	14.200	12.500	12.400	12.733	51.833
15	Helene Schäfer (GER)	12.900	13.433	12.300	13.100	51.733
16	Sanna Veerman (NED)	13.733	13.166	11.966	12.733	51.598
17	Emma Höfele (GER)	13.966	12.200	12.166	13.200	51.532
18	Dorka Szujó (HUN)	13.266	12.066	13.366	12.633	51.331
19	Polina Borzykh (GEO)	12.658	13.300	13.800	11.500	51.258
20	Marie Skammelsen (DEN)	14.433	11.500	11.966	13.033	50.932
21	Vendula Měrková (CZE)	12.900	12.433	13.033	12.533	50.899
22	Valeriia Iarmolenko (UKR)	13.433	11.766	12.800	12.500	50.499
23	Kristýna Brabcová (CZE)	13.333	10.900	13.300	12.833	50.366
24	Amelia Sánchez (ESP)	12.566	12.333	13.100	10.500	48.499

==== Vault ====
Oldest and youngest competitors

	Name	Country	Date of birth	Age
Youngest	Morgane Osyssek-Reimer	France	15 December 2002	13 years, 5 months and 21 days
Oldest	Olivia Cîmpian	Romania	1 January 2001	15 years, 5 months and 4 days

Rank	Gymnast	D Score	E Score	Pen.	Score 1	D Score	E Score	Pen.	Score 2	Total
1st place, gold medalist(s)	(Italy) Martina Maggio	5.8	9.066		14.866	5.0	9.133		14.133	14.499
2nd place, silver medalist(s)	(Italy) Martina Basile	5.3	9.066		14.366	5.0	9.100		14.100	14.233
2nd place, silver medalist(s)	(Romania) Denisa Golgotă	5.8	8.833	-0.1	14.533	5.0	8.933		13.933	14.233
4	(Denmark) Marie Skammelsen	5.3	8.958	-0.1	14.158	5.2	8.733		13.933	14.045
5	(France) Morgane Osyssek-Reimer	5.0	8.866		13.866	5.3	8.900		14.200	14.033
6	(Russia) Elena Eremina	5.3	8.933	-0.1	14.133	5.8	7.833		13.633	13.883
7	(Switzerland) Livia Schmid	5.0	9.000		14.000	4.8	8.933		13.733	13.866
8	(Romania) Olivia Cîmpian	5.0	8.866		13.866	5.8	7.566	-0.1	13.266	13.566

==== Uneven bars ====
Oldest and youngest competitors

	Name	Country	Date of birth	Age
Youngest	Leonie Meier	Switzerland	8 November 2002	13 years, 6 months and 28 days
Oldest	Anastasia Ilyankova	Russia	12 January 2001	15 years, 4 months and 24 days

Position	Gymnast	D Score	E Score	Penalty	Total
1st place, gold medalist(s)	(Russia) Anastasia Ilyankova	6.2	8.566		14.766
2nd place, silver medalist(s)	(Russia) Uliana Perebinosova	6.2	8.166		14.366
3rd place, bronze medalist(s)	(France) Lorette Charpy	5.8	8.500		14.300
4	(United Kingdom) Alice Kinsella	5.6	8.208		13.808
5	(Switzerland) Lynn Genhart	5.0	8.433		13.433
6	(France) Janna Mouffok	5.3	8.100		13.400
7	(Germany) Helene Schäfer	5.2	8.133		13.333
8	(Switzerland) Leonie Meier	5.3	7.133		12.433

==== Balance beam ====
Oldest and youngest competitors

	Name	Country	Date of birth	Age
Youngest	Lorette Charpy	France	3 December 2001	14 years, 6 months and 2 days
Oldest	Anastasia Ilyankova	Russia	12 January 2001	15 years, 4 months and 24 days

Position	Gymnast	D Score	E Score	Penalty	Total
1st place, gold medalist(s)	(Russia) Anastasia Ilyankova	5.7	8.700		14.400
2nd place, silver medalist(s)	(United Kingdom) Alice Kinsella	5.6	8.566		14.166
3rd place, bronze medalist(s)	(Russia) Elena Eremina	5.4	8.441		13.841
4	(France) Lorette Charpy	5.4	8.433		13.833
5	(United Kingdom) Maisie Methuen	5.7	8.033		13.733
6	(Germany) Helene Schäfer	5.3	7.666		12.966
7	(Georgia (country)) Polina Borzykh	5.6	7.166		12.766
8	(Romania) Ioana Crișan	0.3	8.833	-8.0	1.133

==== Floor ====
Oldest and youngest competitors

	Name	Country	Date of birth	Age
Youngest	Alisson Lapp	France	1 August 2002	13 years, 10 months and 4 days
Oldest	Alice Kinsella	Great Britain	13 March 2001	15 years, 2 months and 23 days

Position	Gymnast	D Score	E Score	Penalty	Total
1st place, gold medalist(s)	(Romania) Denisa Golgotă	5.5	8.433		13.933
2nd place, silver medalist(s)	(United Kingdom) Alice Kinsella	5.6	8.266		13.866
3rd place, bronze medalist(s)	(Russia) Uliana Perebinosova	5.5	8.500	-0.2	13.800
4	(France) Alisson Lapp	5.1	8.666	-0.1	13.666
4	(Italy) Francesca Linari	5.4	8.266		13.666
6	(United Kingdom) Megan Parker	5.1	8.500	-0.1	13.500
7	(Netherlands) Naomi Visser	4.9	8.300		13.200
8	(Russia) Elena Eremina	5.5	7.300		12.800

==== Qualification ====
===== All-around =====
Rank	Gymnast	Nation	Vault (gymnastics)	Uneven bars	Balance beam	Floor (gymnastics)	Total	Qual.
1	Elena Eremina	Russia						Q
2	Anastasia Ilyankova	Russia						Q
3	Alice Kinsella	Great Britain						Q
4	Lorette Charpy	France						Q
5	Ioana Crișan	Romania						Q
6	Martina Basile	Italy						Q
7	Maisie Methuen	Great Britain						Q
8	Anina Wildi	Switzerland						Q
9	Carmen Ghiciuc	Romania						Q
10	Olivia Cîmpian	Romania						–
11	Emma Höfele	Germany						Q
12	Helene Schäfer	Germany						Q
13	Polina Borzykh	Georgia						Q
14	Lynn Genhart	Switzerland						Q
15	Leonie Meier	Switzerland						–
16	Rinke Santy	Belgium						Q
17	Maellyse Brassart	Belgium						Q
18	Livia Schmid	Switzerland						–
19	Morgane Osyssek-Reimer	France						Q
20	Myrthe Potoms	Belgium						–
21	Dorka Szujó	Hungary						Q
22	Valeriia Iarmolenko	Ukraine						Q
23	Vendula Měrková	Czech Republic						Q
24	Sanna Veerman	Netherlands						Q
25	Marie Skammelsen	Denmark						Q
26	Isabelle Stingl	Germany						–
27	Francesca Linari	Italy						Q
28	Amelia Sánchez	Spain						Q
29	Kristýna Brabcová	Czech Republic						Q
30	Diana Varinska	Ukraine						R1
31	Juliette Berens	Netherlands						R2
32	Lucie Jiříková	Czech Republic						–
33	Valeriia Osipova	Ukraine						–
34	Jessica Hutchinson	Bulgaria						R3
35	Noémi Jakab	Hungary						R4

===== Vault =====
Rank	Gymnast	Nation	D Score	E Score	Pen.	Score 1	D Score	E Score	Pen.	Score 2	Total	Qual.
Rank	Gymnast	Nation	Vault 1				Vault 2				Total	Qual.
1	Elena Eremina	Russia	5.300	9.066		14.366	5.800	8.900		14.700	14.533	Q
2	Denisa Golgotă	Romania	5.800	9.133		14.933	5.000	9.000		14.000	14.466	Q
3	Martina Maggio	Italy	5.800	9.033		14.833	5.000	9.066		14.066	14.449	Q
4	Olivia Cîmpian	Romania	5.800	8.766		14.566	5.000	9.066		14.066	14.316	Q
5	Martina Basile	Italy	5.300	8.933		14.233	5.000	9.100		14.100	14.166	Q
6	Morgane Osyssek-Reimer	France	5.000	8.900		13.900	5.300	9.000		14.300	14.100	Q
7	Maria Cocciolo	Italy	5.300	8.800		14.100	5.000	8.933		13.933	14.016	–
8	Marie Skammelsen	Denmark	5.300	8.700		14.000	5.200	8.733		13.933	13.966	Q
9	Livia Schmid	Switzerland	5.000	9.000		14.000	4.800	9.100		13.900	13.950	Q
10	Jessica Hutchinson	Bulgaria	5.000	8.800		13.800	5.300	8.733		14.033	13.916	R1
11	Anina Wildi	Switzerland	5.000	9.033		14.033	4.600	9.066		13.666	13.849	R2
12	Maisie Methuen	Great Britain	5.000	8.866		13.866	4.600	8.966		13.566	13.716	R3

===== Uneven bars =====
Rank	Gymnast	Nation	D Score	E Score	Pen.	Total	Qual.
1	Anastasia Ilyankova	Russia	6.200	8.400		14.600	Q
2	Uliana Perebinosova	Russia	6.200	8.200		14.400	Q
3	Lorette Charpy	France	5.800	8.500		14.300	Q
4	Elena Eremina	Russia	5.800	8.200		14.000	–
4	Angelina Simakova	Russia	5.800	8.200		14.000	–
6	Alice Kinsella	Great Britain	5.600	8.266		13.866	Q
7	Helene Schäfer	Germany	5.500	8.100		13.600	Q
8	Leonie Meier	Switzerland	5.400	8.133		13.533	Q
9	Janna Mouffok	France	5.300	8.200		13.500	Q
10	Lynn Genhart	Switzerland	5.200	8.266		13.466	Q
11	Maisie Methuen	Great Britain	5.300	8.133		13.433	R1
12	Anina Wildi	Switzerland	5.200	8.166		13.366	–
13	Dorka Szujó	Hungary	5.200	8.133		13.333	R2
14	Martina Basile	Italy	5.000	8.300		13.300	R3

===== Balance beam =====
Rank	Gymnast	Nation	D Score	E Score	Pen.	Total	Qual.
1	Anastasia Ilyankova	Russia	5.800	8.483		14.283	Q
2	Elena Eremina	Russia	5.400	8.866		14.266	Q
3	Lorette Charpy	France	5.700	8.475		14.175	Q
4	Varvara Zubova	Russia	5.800	8.366		14.166	–
5	Ioana Crișan	Romania	6.000	8.133		14.133	Q
6	Uliana Perebinosova	Russia	5.700	8.366		14.066	–
7	Polina Borzykh	Georgia	6.000	8.033		14.033	Q
8	Alice Kinsella	Great Britain	5.600	8.400		14.400	Q
9	Maisie Methuen	Great Britain	5.800	8.133		13.933	Q
10	Helene Schäfer	Germany	5.700	8.100		13.800	Q
11	Vendula Měrková	Czech Republic	5.200	8.516		13.716	R1
12	Lynn Genhart	Switzerland	5.400	8.233		13.633	R2
13	Carmen Ghiciuc	Romania	5.400	8.166		13.566	R3

===== Floor =====
Rank	Gymnast	Nation	D Score	E Score	Pen.	Total	Qual.
1	Elena Eremina	Russia	5.600	8.500		14.100	Q
2	Uliana Perebinosova	Russia	5.500	8.166		13.666	Q
3	Olivia Cîmpian	Romania	5.500	8.133		13.633	Q
4	Alice Kinsella	Great Britain	5.600	8.033		13.633	Q
5	Megan Parker	Great Britain	5.100	8.433		13.533	Q
6	Angelina Simakova	Russia	5.400	8.133		13.533	–
7	Naomi Visser	Netherlands	5.200	8.233		13.433	Q
8	Denisa Golgotă	Romania	5.500	7.933		13.433	Q
9	Ioana Crișan	Romania	5.600	7.833		13.433	–
10	Alisson Lapp	France	5.100	8.300		13.400	Q
11	Carmen Ghiciuc	Romania	5.200	8.166		13.366	–
12	Francesca Linari	Italy	5.400	7.933		13.333	R1
13	Maria Cocciolo	Italy	5.200	8.100		13.300	R2
14	Livia Schmid	Switzerland	5.000	8.233		13.233	R3
