= Sydney Johnson-Scharpf =

American artistic gymnast

- Full name: Sydney Ashlyn Brittenham
- Born: August 2, 2000 (age 26) Orlando, Florida, U.S.
- Spouse: Hugh Brittenham (m. 2024)

Gymnastics career
- Discipline: Women's artistic gymnastics
- Country represented: United States; (2015–2016)
- College team: Florida Gators (2018–2022)
- Club: Brandy Johnson's
- Head coaches: Brandy Johnson & Kelly Pitzen
Medal record
Women's gymnastics
Representing the United States
Reykjavik International Games
Gold medal – first place	2017 Reykjavik	Vault
Gold medal – first place	2017 Reykjavik	Floor Exercise
Silver medal – second place	2017 Reykjavik	Uneven Bars
Bronze medal – third place	2017 Reykjavik	All-Around

Sydney Ashlyn Brittenham (née Johnson-Scharpf; born August 2, 2000, in Orlando, Florida) is an American former artistic gymnast and is the daughter of Brandy Johnson, a member of the 1988 USA Olympic Team.

== Gymnastics career ==
Johnson-Scharpf competed at the 2013 Nastia Liukin Cup and placed 23rd. She later qualified to elite-level gymnastics and competed at the U.S. Classic, finishing eighteenth. At U.S. Nationals, Sydney placed 27th.

At the 2014 U.S. Classic Johnson-Scharpf finished thirty-first in the all-around. She later advanced to the 2014 National Championships where she finished twenty-fifth after two days of competition. She competed at the 2015 U.S. Classic where she finished seventh. At the 2015 National Championships she finished sixth in the all-around with a two-day combined total of 110.900, earning a spot on the 2015-2016 Junior National Team.

In 2016 Johnson-Scharpf became age-eligible for senior level competition. In her first year as a senior she competed at the 2016 City of Jesolo Trophy. She finished eighteenth in the all-around.

In June 2016, Johnson-Scharpf suffered a knee injury and was not able to compete at the U.S. Classic or the National Championships.

In early 2017 Johnson-Scharpf competed at the Reykjavik International Games. While there she placed third in the all-around behind Eythora Thorsdottir and Daria Spiridonova. At the 2017 National Championships she finished fourth on floor exercise.

== Personal life ==
Johnson-Scharpf was born on August 2, 2000, in Orlando, Florida, to Brandy Johnson-Scharpf and Bill Scharpf. Her mom, Brandy, is a former gymnast and represented the U.S. at the 1988 Olympics.

The family currently lives in Clermont, Florida. Sydney graduated high school from Montverde Academy in 2018. She competed on the Gators Gymnastics Team (2018-2022) and graduated from the University of Florida in April 2022 with a degree in Digital Arts and Sciences. She is now a gymnastics coach at Brandy Johnson’s Gymnastics and is married to Hugh Brittenham (March 2024 – present), who is a former Track & Field athlete at the University of Florida.
