= Martina Basile =

Italian gymnast

- Born: 13 October 2002 (age 23) Rome, Italy

Gymnastics career
- Discipline: Women's artistic gymnastics
- Country represented: Italy (2015–2019)
- Gym: Olos Gym 2000
Medal record
Representing Italy
Mediterranean Games
Gold medal – first place	2018 Tarragona	Team

Martina Basile (born 10 October 2002) is an Italian former artistic gymnast. She won a gold medal with the Italian team at the 2018 Mediterranean Games. She competed at the 2018 European Championships and 2018 World Championships. She won the bronze medal in the all-around competition and the silver medal on vault at the 2016 Junior European Championships.

== Gymnastics career ==
=== Junior ===
At the 2016 City of Jesolo Trophy, Basile finished fourth on the vault and eighth on the balance beam. She won the bronze medal in the all-around final at the 2016 Junior European Championships. She tied with Romania's Denisa Golgotă for the silver medal on the vault. At the 2017 Mediterranean Junior Championships, she helped the Italian team win the gold medal by over seven points ahead of Spain, and she won the bronze medal in the all-around behind teammates Elisa Iorio and Alice D'Amato. She won silver medals on both the balance beam and floor exercise at the 2017 Italian Championships.

=== Senior ===
Basile won a bronze medal with the Italian team at the 2018 City of Jesolo Trophy, and she finished fifth in the balance beam final. At the 2018 Mediterranean Games, she helped Italy win the team title. She competed with the Italian team that finished sixth at the 2018 European Championships. Individually, she qualified for the floor exercise final and finished fifth. She was initially the alternate for the 2018 World Championships but was added to the team after Elisa Meneghini withdrew. Italy finished 12th in the qualification round and did not advance into the final.

Basile stopped competing during the 2019 season.
