= Liepiņa =

Liepiņa is a surname. Notable people with the surname include:

- Anita Liepiņa (born 1967), Latvian athlete
- Lidija Liepiņa (1891–1985), Latvian chemist
- Līga Liepiņa (born 1946), Latvian actress
- Linda Liepiņa (born 1974), Latvian businesswoman and politician
- Zinaida Liepiņa (1907–2000), Latvian sprinter
