= Louise Vanhille =

French artistic gymnast

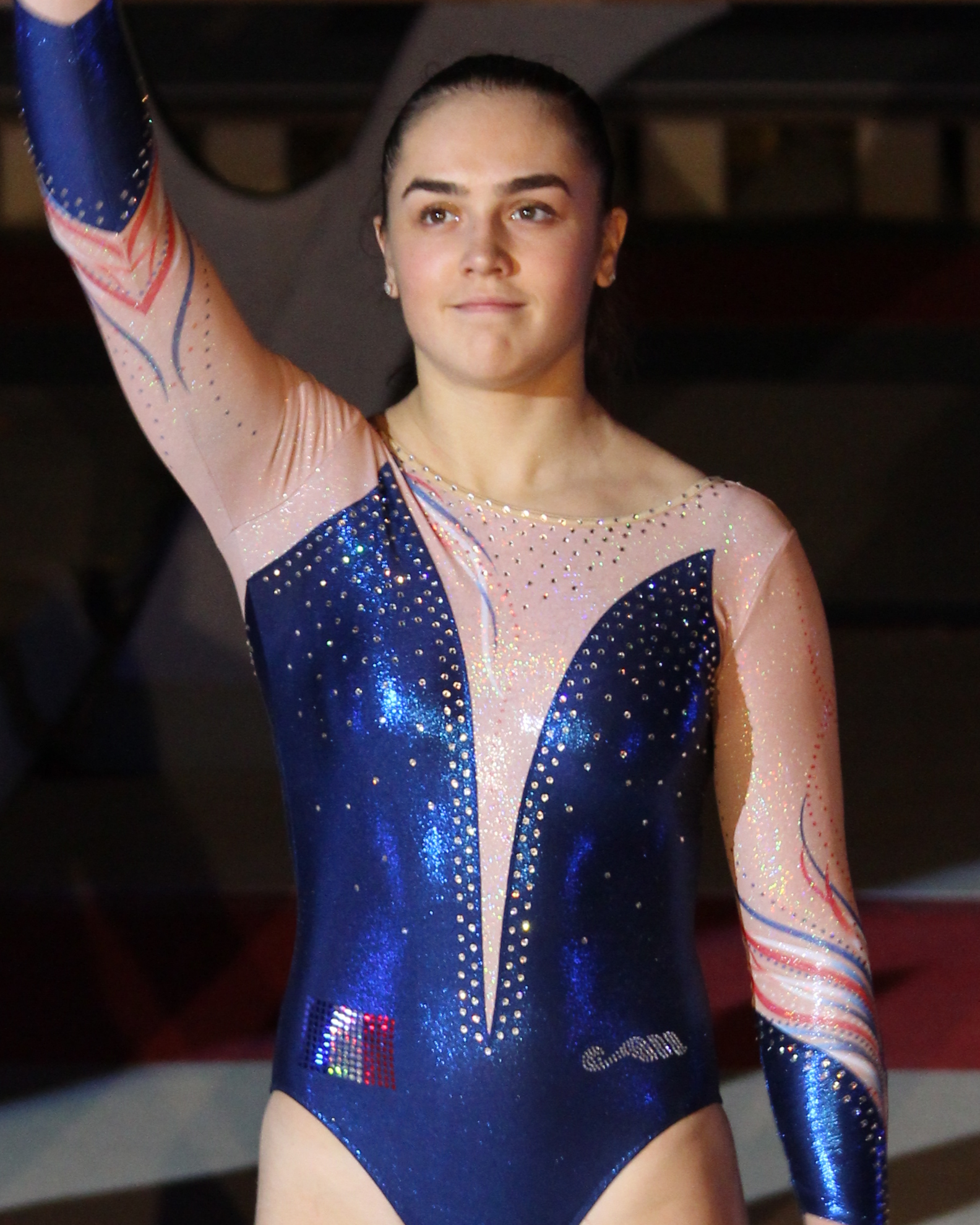
- Vanhille at the Sainté Gym Show in 2018.

Personal information
- Born: 6 November 1998 (age 27) Dunkirk, France
- Height: 1.670 m (5 ft 5.7 in)

Gymnastics career
- Discipline: Women's artistic gymnastics
- Country represented: France; (2015–2018)
- Club: Dunkerque Gym
- Gym: Pole France de Saint-Etienne
- Head coaches: Éric Hagard, Monique Hagard
- Retired: 2018
Medal record
Representing France
Women's artistic gymnastics
Mediterranean Games
Gold medal – first place	2018 Tarragona	Uneven bars
Silver medal – second place	2018 Tarragona	Team
Silver medal – second place	2018 Tarragona	All-around
Bronze medal – third place	2018 Tarragona	Balance beam

Louise Vanhille (born 6 November 1998) is a retired French female artistic gymnast. She participated at the 2015 and 2018 World Championships. She represented France at the 2016 Summer Olympics where the French team finished eleventh, and Vanhille finished twenty-first in the all-around final.

== Early life ==
Louise Vanhille was born on 6 November 1998 in Dunkirk, France. When she was ten years old, Vanhille left her family to train in Saint-Étienne. Her parents are named Karine and Thierry, and she has a younger brother named Paul.

== Junior career ==
=== 2012 ===
Vanhille made her international debut at the Junior European Championships. The French team of Vanhille, Claire Martin, Valentine Pikul, Clara Chambellant, and Maelys Plessis finished seventh. At the France-Romania Friendly, the French junior team finished second, and Vanhille finished second in the all-around behind Romania's Ştefania Stănilă. Then Vanhille won a bronze medal with the team at the International Gymnix, and Vanhille finished eleventh in the all-around and fourth on beam. Vanhille won a silver in the all-around at the Élite Gym Massilia, and she finished sixth on vault, fourth on uneven bars, eleventh on balance beam, and sixth on floor exercise.

=== 2013 ===
Vanhille began her season with a silver medal on uneven bars at the International Gymnix. At the National Championships, Vanhille won gold medals with her team, Dunkerque Gym, and on uneven bars. At the France-Romania Junior Friendly, the French team finished second, and Vanhille won a silver on vault and a bronze on uneven bars. She also placed seventh in the all-around and sixth on balance beam. She was then selected to represent France at the European Youth Olympic Festival along with Claire Martin and Laura Longueville. They placed fourth as a team, and individually, Vanhille finished sixth in the all-around, eighth on balance beam, and she won a silver medal on uneven bars behind Martina Rizzelli. At the Élite Gym Massilia, Vanhille finished fourth with her team and sixteenth in the all-around, and she won a gold medal on uneven bars. Then, at the French National Cup, Vanhille tied with Anne Kuhm for the all-around gold medal.

== Senior career ==
=== 2014 ===
Vanhille's senior debut was delayed by an elbow injury that left her out for six months. She made her return at the Élite Gym Massilia where she finished fourth with her team, fifth in the all-around, and fourth on uneven bars.

=== 2015 ===
Vanhille competed at the National Championships where her team finished fourth, and she won gold on uneven bars and silvers in the all-around and on floor. She then competed at the City of Jesolo Trophy where the French team finished fourth. She was then selected to compete at the European Championships, but she did not qualify for any finals. Vanhille then competed at the Flanders International Team Challenge where France finished fourth, and Vanhille finished twentieth in the all-around. France lost to Romania in the Romania-France Friendly, but Vanhille won gold on uneven bars and finished fourth in the all-around. Then, France beat Spain in the France-Spain Friendly, and Vanhille finished second in the all-around behind Marine Brevet, and she won gold on the uneven bars. She was then selected to represent France at the World Championships along with Marine Brevet, Loan His, Anne Kuhm, Claire Martin, and Valentine Pikul. The team finished in tenth place which meant they did not qualify for the 2016 Olympic Games and would have to go to the 2016 Olympic Test Event.

=== 2016 ===
Vanhille went to the City of Jesolo Trophy where the French team placed fourth, and Vanhille placed fourth on uneven bars. Vanhille was selected to compete at the Olympic Test Event along with Marine Brevet, Marine Boyer, Oréane Lechenault, Loan His, and Anne Kuhm. The team finished fourth which secured their spot for the 2016 Olympic Games. She then competed at the National Championships where she finished fifth in the all-around, and won bronze on uneven bars and silver on floor exercise. In the France vs Romania Rematch, France beat Romania, and Vanhille finished second in the all-around behind Melanie de Jesus dos Santos. She also won bronze on vault and floor exercise. Vanhille competed at the Chemnitz Friendly where France finished second to Germany, and Vanhille finished sixth in the all-around and won bronze on uneven bars.

==== 2016 Olympic Games ====
Vanhille was selected to represent France at the 2016 Olympic Games along with Marine Boyer, Marine Brevet, Loan His, and Oréane Lechenault. France competed in the final subdivision of the qualification round. The team finished eleventh and did not qualify for the team final. Vanhille achieved a personal-best all-around score of 55.765 and qualified for the all-around final. Afterwards, Vanhille said, "I started well, so it boosted me. I had fun, I have never done a competition like that. I felt the pressure rise in the warm-up room and then entering the room but when the event was launched, I really enjoyed myself." In the all-around final, Vanhille finished twenty-first with a score of 54.666. The Olympics were Vanhille's last competition of the season.

=== 2017 ===
Vanhille returned to competition at the Top 12 Championships, a competition between the best twelve clubs in France, and Vanhille competed for her native club, Dunkerque Gym. The club finished in fifth place, but Vanhille won the all-around gold medal in addition to a silver on beam and a bronze on floor. At the National Championships, Vanhille won bronze on balance beam and placed sixth in the all-around and on uneven bars. She competed at the Élite Gym Massilia where she placed fifth with her team and on balance beam and sixth in the all-around. At the Top 12 Series 2, Dunkerque beat Elbeuf, and individually, Vanhille won gold medals in the all-around and on uneven bars and floor exercise, and she won bronze medals on vault and beam.

=== 2018 ===
At the Top 12 Series 3, Dunkerque lost to Haguenau, but Vanhille won the gold medal on floor exercise. Then at the Top 12 Series 4, Dunkerque beat Schiltigheim, and Vanhille won silver medals on vault and uneven bars. At the Doha World Cup, Vanhille placed sixth on uneven bars. At the City of Jesolo Trophy, Vanhille finished fourteenth in the all-around. Then at the National Championships, Vanhille won silver medals in the all-around and on beam and placed fourth on uneven bars and fifth on floor. Vanhille was selected to compete at the Mediterranean Games with Sheyen Petit, Marine Boyer, Grace Charpy, and Morgane Osyssek Reimer. The team finished second to Italy, and Vanhille finished second in the all-around to Lara Mori. Vanhille won the gold medal on the uneven bars and the bronze medal on balance beam, and she placed seventh on floor exercise. At the Sainté Gym Cup, Vanhille won bronze on vault and silver on uneven bars. She then competed at the Rüsselsheim Friendly where the French tea, finished fourth. She was then selected to compete at the World Championships along with Juliette Bossu, Marine Boyer, Lorette Charpy, and Mélanie de Jesus dos Santos, and they finished fifth in the team final. Then, at the Top 12 Series 1, Dunkerque defeated Beaucaire, and Vanhille won gold on vault and balance beam and silver on uneven bars.

== Retirement ==
In December 2018, Vanhille announced her retirement from gymnastics, but she will be joining Cirque du Soleil troupe as a performer. In an interview she said, "The idea had been going around my head for a while. I had done the entire tour with gymnastics and I was looking for something new, something that would allow me to continue living wonderful experiences and still being in the artistic world."

== Competitive history ==
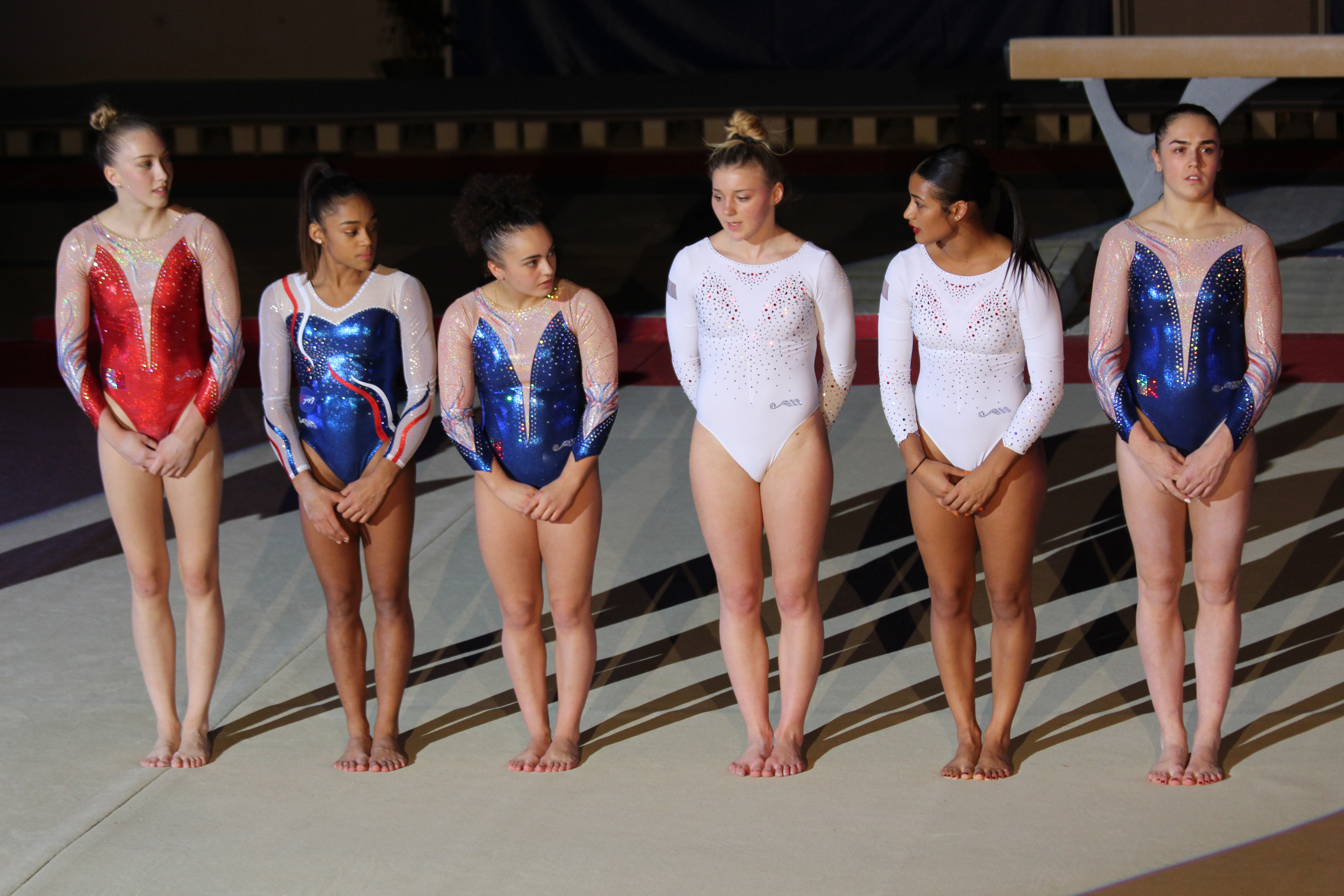
The French team at the Sainté Gym Show in 2018. From left to right: Juliette Bossu, Mélanie de Jesus dos Santos, Coline Devillard, Lorette Charpy, Marine Boyer, Vanhille.

=== Junior ===
Year	Event	Team	AA	VT	UB	BB	FX
2012
2012	Junior European Championships	7					
2012	FRA-ROU Friendly	2nd place, silver medalist(s)	2nd place, silver medalist(s)				
2012	International Gymnix	3rd place, bronze medalist(s)	11			4	
2012	Élite Gym Massilia		2nd place, silver medalist(s)	6	4	11	6
2013	International Gymnix				2nd place, silver medalist(s)		
2013	National Championships	1st place, gold medalist(s)			1st place, gold medalist(s)		
2013	France-Romania Junior Friendly	2nd place, silver medalist(s)	7	2nd place, silver medalist(s)	3rd place, bronze medalist(s)	6	
2013	European Youth Olympic Festival	4	6		2nd place, silver medalist(s)	8	
2013	Élite Gym Massilia	4	16		1st place, gold medalist(s)		
2013	French National Cup		1st place, gold medalist(s)				

=== Senior ===
Year	Event	Team	AA	VT	UB	BB	FX
2014	Élite Gym Massilia	4	5		4		
2015	National Championships	4	2nd place, silver medalist(s)		1st place, gold medalist(s)		2nd place, silver medalist(s)
2015	City of Jesolo Trophy	4					
2015	European Championships						
2015	Flanders International Team Challenge	4	20				
2015	France-Romania Friendly	2nd place, silver medalist(s)	4	9	1st place, gold medalist(s)	7	10
2015	France-Spain Friendly	1st place, gold medalist(s)	2nd place, silver medalist(s)		1st place, gold medalist(s)		
2015	World Championships	10					
2016	City of Jesolo Trophy	4			4		
2016	Olympic Test Event	4					
2016	National Championships		5		3rd place, bronze medalist(s)		2nd place, silver medalist(s)
2016	France-Romania Friendly	1st place, gold medalist(s)	2nd place, silver medalist(s)	3rd place, bronze medalist(s)			3rd place, bronze medalist(s)
2016	Chemnitz Friendly	2nd place, silver medalist(s)	6		3rd place, bronze medalist(s)		
2016	Olympic Games	11	21				
2017	France Top 12 Championships	5	1st place, gold medalist(s)			2nd place, silver medalist(s)	3rd place, bronze medalist(s)
2017	National Championships		6		6	3rd place, bronze medalist(s)	
2017	Élite Gym Massilia	5	6			5	
2017	Top 12 Series 2	1st place, gold medalist(s)	1st place, gold medalist(s)	3rd place, bronze medalist(s)	1st place, gold medalist(s)	3rd place, bronze medalist(s)	1st place, gold medalist(s)
2018	Top 12 Series 3	2nd place, silver medalist(s)					1st place, gold medalist(s)
2018	Top 12 Series 4	1st place, gold medalist(s)	2nd place, silver medalist(s)	2nd place, silver medalist(s)			
2018	Doha World Cup				6		
2018	City of Jesolo Trophy		14				
2018	National Championships		2nd place, silver medalist(s)		4	2nd place, silver medalist(s)	5
2018	Mediterranean Games	2nd place, silver medalist(s)	2nd place, silver medalist(s)		1st place, gold medalist(s)	3rd place, bronze medalist(s)	7
2018	Sainté Gym Cup			3rd place, bronze medalist(s)	2nd place, silver medalist(s)		
2018	Rüsselsheim Friendly	4					
2018	World Championships	5					
2018	Top 12 Series 1	1st place, gold medalist(s)		1st place, gold medalist(s)	2nd place, silver medalist(s)	1st place, gold medalist(s)	

== See also ==
- List of Olympic female gymnasts for France
