= Marine Brevet =

French artistic gymnast

- Full name: Marine Grace Brevet
- Born: 23 November 1994 (age 31) Viriat, France
- Height: 162 cm (5 ft 4 in)

Gymnastics career
- Discipline: Women's artistic gymnastics
- Country represented: France; (2007 - 2016 (FRA))
- Club: Détente et Loisirs Viriat
- Head coaches: Veronique Legras, Nellu Pop
- Music: 2015-2016: "Shine On You Crazy Diamond"
- Retired: 2016
Medal record
Representing France
European Championships
Bronze medal – third place	2016 Bern	Team

Marine Grace Brevet (born 23 November 1994) is a French former artistic gymnast. She was a member of the team that won a bronze medal at the 2016 European Championships. She was supposed to represent France at the 2012 Summer Olympics, but a dislocated elbow one month before forced her to withdraw. She represented France at the 2016 Summer Olympics where she finished 11th with the French team, and individually, she finished 15th in the all-around final.

== Career ==
Brevet won the junior national all-around title in 2009. She then became the senior national all-around champion in 2010. She competed at her first World Championships in 2010 and was the third reserve for the all-around final. Then at the 2011 World Championships, she finished 11th with the French team. She was also the first reserve for the all-around final.

Brevet competed with the French team that finished third at the 2012 Olympic Test Event and qualified for the 2012 Summer Olympics. In the event finals, she tied with Brazil's Daiane dos Santos for the bronze medal on floor. She finished second in the all-around at the 2012 French Championships behind Anne Kuhm. She was selected for France's 2012 Olympic team but had to withdraw after dislocating her elbow in training. She then tore her Achilles tendon in 2013.

Brevet finished second in the all-around to Céline van Gerner at the 2014 Rencontre Internationale. She won the bronze medal in the all-around at the 2015 French Championships. Then at the 2015 FIT Challenge, she helped the French team finish fourth and won the bronze medal in the all-around behind Brazilians Flávia Saraiva and Rebeca Andrade.

Brevet won a bronze medal with the French team at the 2016 European Championships. She was selected to represent France at the 2016 Summer Olympics alongside Marine Boyer, Loan His, Oréane Lechenault, and Louise Vanhille, and she was named the team captain. The team finished 11th in the qualification round and did not advance to the team final. Brevet did qualify for the individual all-around final where she finished 15th. She announced her retirement from the sport after the Olympic Games.
