= L'Épine =

L'Épine may refer to the following places in France:

- L'Épine, Hautes-Alpes, a commune in the department of Hautes-Alpes
- L'Épine, Marne, a commune in the department of Marne
- L'Épine, Vendée, a commune in the department of Vendée
- L'Épine-aux-Bois, a commune in the department of Aisne
- Chaîne de l'Épine, a mountain ridge in the department of Savoie, near Chambéry
