= Carmen Ghiciuc =

Romanian artistic gymnast

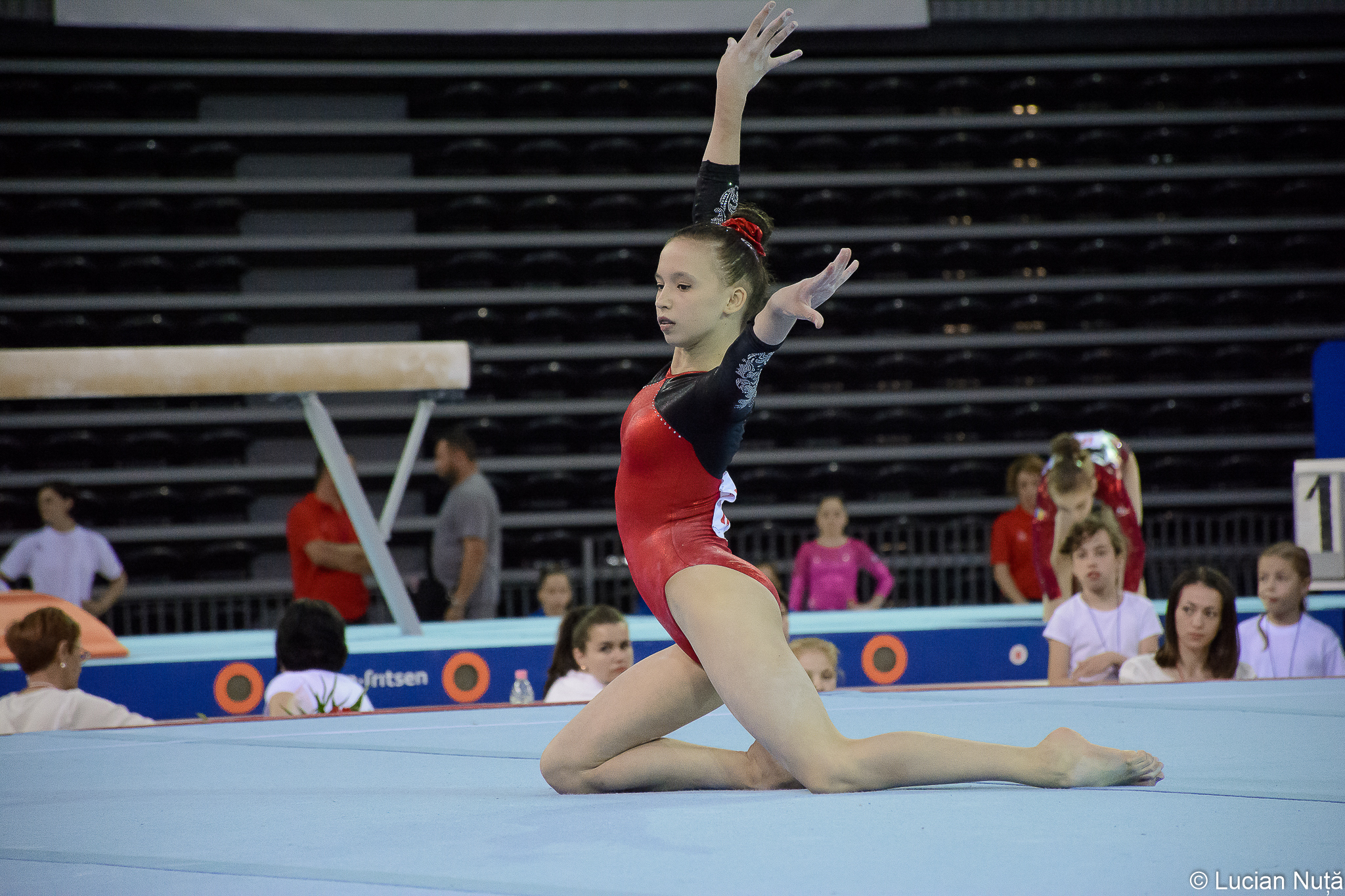
- Born: 10 May 2001 (age 25)

Gymnastics career
- Discipline: Women's artistic gymnastics
- Country represented: Romania (2016–present (ROU))

Carmen Ghiciuc (born 10 May 2001) is a Romanian artistic gymnast. She won the bronze medal with the Romanian team at the 2016 European Women's Artistic Gymnastics Championships.

== Competitive History ==
=== Junior ===
Year	Event	Team	AA	VT	UB	BB	FX
2015	National Championships	3rd	13th	5th			
2016	Nadia comaneci International Invitational		2nd				
2016	BEL-ROU Friendly	1st	1st				
2016	FRA-ROU Friendly	1st	4th				
2016	Junior European Championships	3rd	8th				
2016	National Championships		6th	7th	8th		6th
2016	Gymnasiade	2nd	15th		2nd		
2016	Junior National Championships				3rd		

=== Senior ===
Year	Event	Team	AA	VT	UB	BB	FX
2017	National Championships	1st	10th		2nd		
2018	Gym Festival Trnava		2nd		2nd	5th	3rd
2018	National Championships		9th		4th	3rd	
2018	Izvorani Friendly	1st	4th				
2018	Deva Friendly	1st	2nd				
2019	Osijek World Challenge Cup					2nd	
