= Lavinia Marongiu =

Italian artistic gymnast (born 1998)

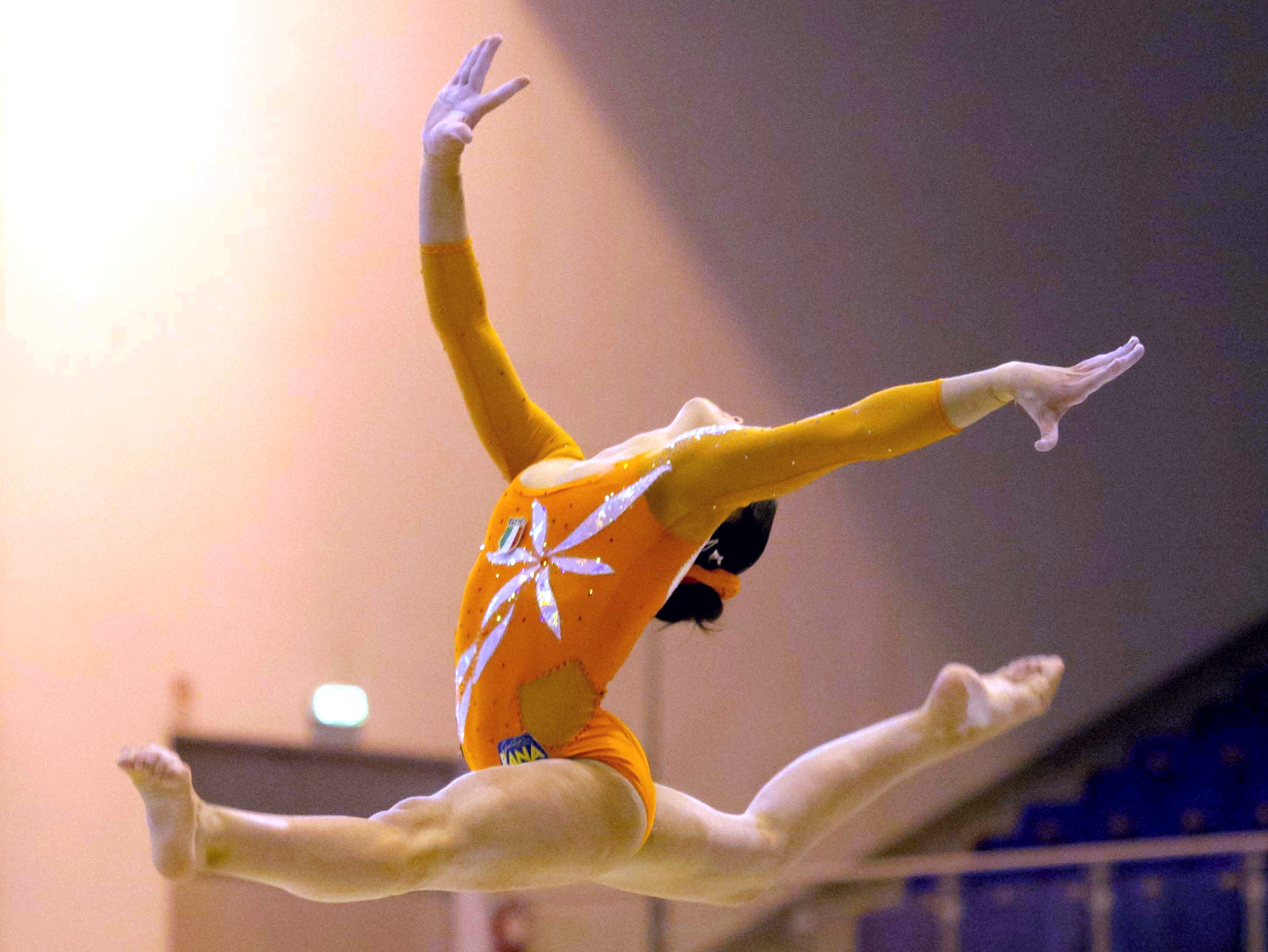
- Marongiu at the 2013 City of Jesolo Trophy

Personal information
- Full name: Lavinia Marongiu
- Born: 26 September 1998 (age 27) Rome, Italy

Gymnastics career
- Discipline: Women's artistic gymnastics
- Country represented: Italy (2010–2018)
- Club: Ginnastica Romana
- Head coach: Enrico Casella
- Retired: 2018

Lavinia Marongiu (born 28 September 1998) is a retired Italian artistic gymnast.

== Career ==
Marongiu competed at the 2012 City of Jesolo Trophy, and she finished 16th in the junior all-around with a score of 50.250. She also competed at the 2013 City of Jesolo Trophy with Enus Mariani, Tea Ugrin, Martina Rizzelli, Sofia Busato, and Sofia Bonistalli, and the team won the gold medal. Individually, Marongiu won the silver medal on the balance beam behind Bailie Key and finished 5th in the all-around.

At the 2014 2nd Serie A, Marongiu won the bronze medals on uneven bars and in the all-around. Marongiu made her senior international debut at the 2014 City of Jesolo Trophy, and the Italian team won the silver medal behind the United States. Individually, she finished 16th in the all-around with a score of 53.950. At the Italian Championships, she won the bronze medal in the all-around behind Elisa Meneghini and Iosra Abdelaziz. At the Golden League, she won the team gold medal with Brixia Brescia and won the bronze medal on balance beam. She competed at the 2014 World Championships alongside Vanessa Ferrari, Erika Fasana, Lara Mori, Giorgia Campana, Martina Rizzelli, and the team finished 5th.
