= Enus Mariani =

Italian gymnast (born 1998)

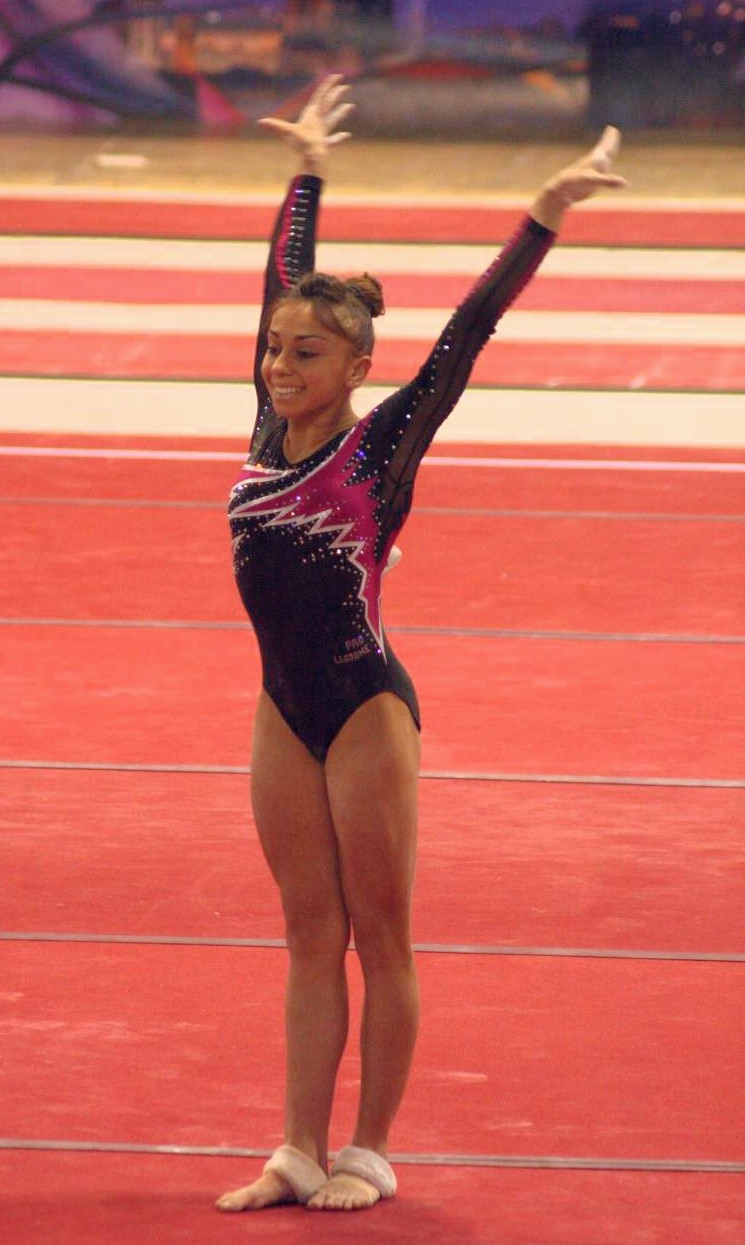
- Mariani in 2013

Personal information
- Born: 4 March 1998 (age 28) Cantù, Lombardy, Italy

Gymnastics career
- Discipline: Women's artistic gymnastics
- Country represented: Italy (2012–2016)
- Club: Pro Lissone
- Head coaches: Federica Gatti, Massimo Gallina
- Retired: 2018

Enus Mariani (born 4 March 1998) is a retired Italian artistic gymnast. She is the 2012 Junior European all-around champion.

== Junior career ==
Mariani made her international debut at a 2010 friendly meet between junior gymnasts from Italy, France, Germany, and Switzerland. The Italian team of Mariani, Serena Bugani, Elisa Meneghini, Lara Mori, and Martina Rizzelli won the gold medal. Mariani finished seventh in the individual all-around.

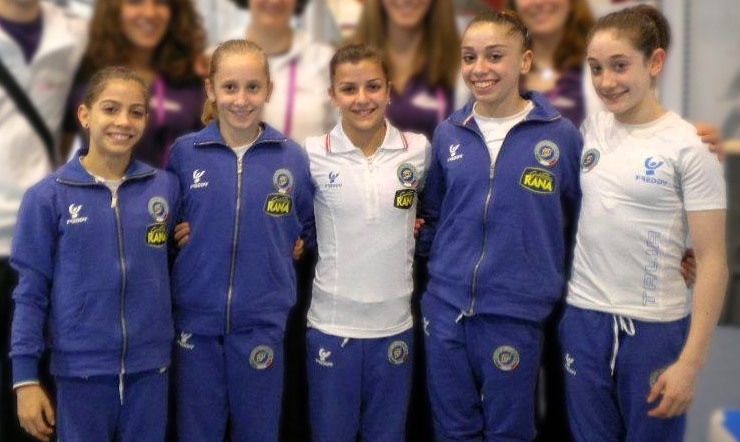
From left to right: Lara Mori, Tea Ugrin, Elisa Meneghini, Enus Mariani, and Alessia Leolini at the 2012 Junior European Championships.

Mariani competed at the 2012 City of Jesolo Trophy and helped the Italian junior team finish second behind the United States. Individually, Mariani won the silver medal in the all-around behind American Lexie Priessman. She also won the bronze medal on the uneven bars behind Americans Katelyn Ohashi and Priessman, and she won the silver medal on the balance beam behind Ohashi. She was then selected to compete at the 2012 Junior European Championships alongside Elisa Meneghini, Lara Mori, Tea Ugrin, and Alessia Leolini, and they won the silver medal behind the Russian team. Mariani won the gold medal in the all-around final with a total score of 56.265. In the event finals, she finished fifth on vault and eighth on the floor exercise.

Mariani competed at the 2013 1st Italian Serie A where the Pro Lissane club finished fifth. In March 2013, she competed at the City of Jesolo Trophy where the Italian junior team won the gold medal. Individually, Mariani won the silver medal in the all-around behind American Bailie Key. She also won the gold medal on the uneven bars and the silver medal on the floor exercise behind Key. In April 2013, she began struggling with back injuries and had to take thirteen months off of training.

== Senior career ==
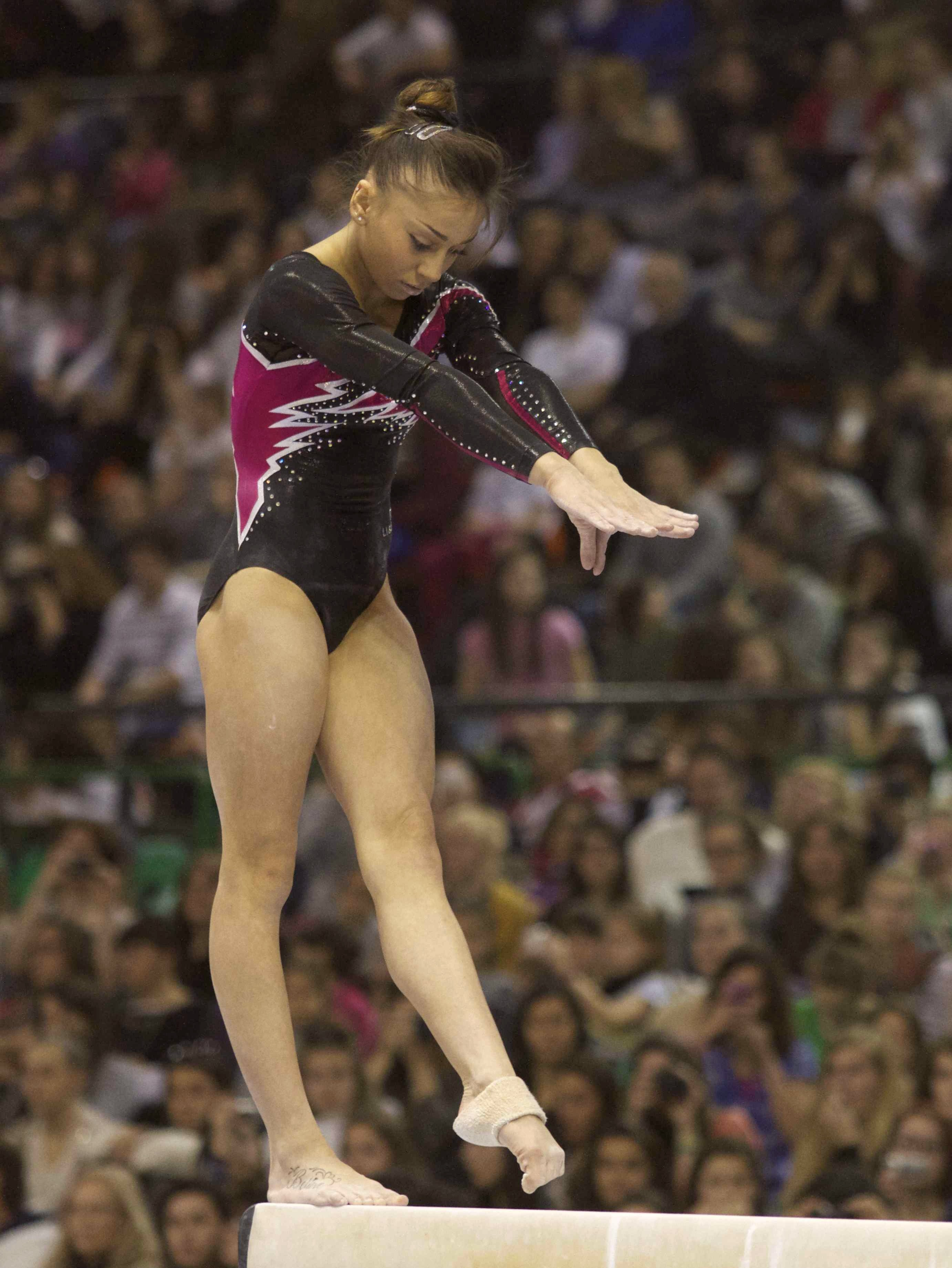
Mariani on the balance beam in 2013.

Mariani was cleared to begin training again in May 2014. Her first senior competition was the Mexico Open in December 2014 where she finished fourth in the all-around.

=== 2015 ===
At the 1st Italian Serie A, Mariani won the team bronze medal with Pro Lissone, and she won the all-around bronze medal behind Erika Fasana and Vanessa Ferrari. At the 2nd Serie A, Pro Lissone finished sixth, and they finished eighth at the 3rd Serie A. At the City of Jesolo Trophy, Mariani only competed on the uneven bars, but she did not advance to the event final. At the 4th Serie A, Pro Lissone finished fourth. Then at the Golden League, she won the bronze medal in the all-around behind Carlotta Ferlito and Martina Rizzelli, and she won the gold medal on the uneven bars and the silver medal on the balance beam behind Ferlito.

At the Italian Championships, Mariani finished tenth in the all-around, seventh on the uneven bars, and fifth on the floor exercise. She then competed at the Novara Cup where the Italian team won the silver medal behind Romania, and she finished fifth in the all-around. She was then selected to compete at the World Championships alongside Carlotta Ferlito, Erika Fasana, Elisa Meneghini, Lara Mori, and Tea Ugrin. The Italian team finished seventh in the team final. She then competed at the Arthur Gander Memorial in November and placed ninth in the all-around. At the Elite Gym Massilia, she won the silver medal on both the uneven bars and the balance beam.

=== 2016 ===
Mariani finished fifth in the all-around at the Glasgow World Cup. At the City of Jesolo Trophy, she won a bronze medal with the Italian team and also placed eleventh in the all-around, sixth on balance beam, and fifth on floor. She competed at the European Championships alongside Elisa Meneghini, Lara Mori, Martina Rizzelli, and Sofia Busato, and they finished fifth in the team final. She was not selected for the 2016 Olympic team.

=== 2017-2018 ===
At the 2017 Italian Championships, Mariani finished eighth on the balance beam. She then competed at the 4th Serie A, and the Pro Lissone team finished eleventh. In 2018, Mariani began coaching at her childhood club, Ginnastica Meda. She officially retired at the end of 2018 due to continued problems with injuries.
