= Sara Ricciardi =

Italian artistic gymnast

- Full name: Sara Ricciardi
- Born: 28 September 1996 (age 29) Patti, Italy

Gymnastics career
- Discipline: Women's artistic gymnastics
- Country represented: Italy
- Club: Corpo Libero Gymnastics Padova
- Head coach: Michela Francia

Sara Ricciardi (born 28 September 1996) is an Italian artistic gymnast. She competed at the 2018 World Championships.

== Personal life ==
Sara Ricciardi was born on 28 September 1996 in Patti, Sicily, Italy. At age 12, she left Sicily to move to Milan to train. She has a condition called thalassemia which causes her to produce an abnormal amount of haemoglobin, and she considered retiring in 2015 due to it but was persuaded to stay by her coach Michela Francia.

== Gymnastics career ==
Ricciardi became age-eligible for senior competition in 2012 and made her international debut at the 2012 City of Jesolo Trophy where the Italian team of Giorgia Campana, Francesca Deagostini, Carlotta Ferlito, Vanessa Ferrari, Giulia Leni won the silver medal behind the United States.

Ricciardi only competed domestically in 2016 and 2017. Her next international competition was the 2018 City of Jesolo Trophy where she finished 25th in the all-around. At the Italian Championships, she won the bronze medal in the all-around behind Giorgia Villa and Elisa Iorio. She withdrew from the 2018 European Championships after fracturing her big toe. She was selected to compete at the 2018 World Championships alongside Irene Lanza, Lara Mori, Martina Rizzelli, and Martina Basile. The team finished 12th in the qualification round, and Ricciardi was the second reserve for the all-around final.

Ricciardi won a silver medal on the vault at the 2019 Italian Championships, where she also placed ninth in the all-around. As of 2025, Ricciardi continues to compete in domestic competitions, but she has not received an international assignment since 2018.
