= Gymnastics at the 2011 European Youth Summer Olympic Festival =

- Venue: Yomra Arena
- Location: (Turkey) Trabzon
- Dates: 25–29 July 2011

Gymnastics at the 2011 European Youth Summer Olympic Festival (EYOF) was held from 25 to 29 July 2011. The competitions took place at the Yomra Arena in Trabzon, Turkey. At most three boys born 1994/1995 and girls born 1996/1997 or later from each country participated at the following 7 disciplines for boys and 6 for girls.

== Medal summary ==
=== Medal table ===
==== Overall ====
Rank	Nation	Gold	Silver	Bronze	Total
1	Romania	4	5	0	9
2	Great Britain	3	3	0	6
3	Italy	1	2	4	7
4	Russia	1	1	2	4
4	Switzerland	1	1	2	4
6	Belarus	1	0	2	3
7	Germany	1	0	1	2
8	Hungary	1	0	0	1
8	Spain	1	0	0	1
10	France	0	1	0	1
10	Lithuania	0	1	0	1
12	Belgium	0	0	1	1
12	Netherlands	0	0	1	1
12	Turkey	0	0	1	1
Totals (14 entries)		14	14	14	42

==== Boys ====
Rank	Nation	Gold	Silver	Bronze	Total
1	Great Britain (GBR)	3	2	0	5
2	Romania (ROU)	1	2	0	3
3	Switzerland (SUI)	1	1	2	4
4	Russia (RUS)	1	1	1	3
5	Belarus (BLR)	1	0	2	3
6	Spain (ESP)	1	0	0	1
7	France (FRA)	0	1	0	1
7	Lithuania (LTU)	0	1	0	1
9	Belgium (BEL)	0	0	1	1
9	Netherlands (NED)	0	0	1	1
9	Turkey (TUR)	0	0	1	1
Totals (11 entries)		8	8	8	24

==== Girls ====
Rank	Nation	Gold	Silver	Bronze	Total
1	Romania (ROU)	3	3	0	6
2	Italy (ITA)	1	2	4	7
3	Germany (GER)	1	0	1	2
4	Hungary (HUN)	1	0	0	1
5	Great Britain (GBR)	0	1	0	1
6	Russia (RUS)	0	0	1	1
Totals (6 entries)		6	6	6	18

=== Medal events ===
==== Boys ====
Event	Gold	Silver	Bronze
Team all-around	Russia	Great Britain	Switzerland
Individual all-around	Courtney Tulloch; Great Britain	Daniel Petrica Vasile Radeanu; Romania	Vasili Mikhalitsyn; Belarus
Floor	Daniel Petrica Vasile Radeanu; Romania	Frank Baines; Great Britain	Andrey Lauhutov; Russia
Pommel horse	Vasili Mikhalitsyn; Belarus	Sergey Stepanov; Russia	Maxime Gentges; Belgium
Rings	Courtney Tulloch; Great Britain	Stephen Micholet; France	İbrahim Çolak; Turkey
Vault	Julian Perez Marchant; Spain	Marco Walter; Switzerland	Christian Baumann; Switzerland
Parallel bars	Frank Baines; Great Britain	Andrei Ioan Groza; Romania	Vasili Mikhalitsyn; Belarus
Horizontal bar	Christian Baumann; Switzerland	Robert Tvorogal; Lithuania	Karl Kosztka; Netherlands

==== Girls ====
Event	Gold	Silver	Bronze
Team all-around	Italy	Romania	Germany
Individual all-around	Larisa Iordache; Romania	Erika Fasana; Italy	Elisa Meneghini; Italy
Vault	Janine Berger; Germany	Larisa Iordache; Romania	Erika Fasana; Italy
Uneven bars	Noémi Makra; Hungary	Larisa Iordache; Romania	Erika Fasana; Italy
Balance beam	Larisa Iordache; Romania	Gabrielle Jupp; Great Britain	Francesca Deagostini; Italy
Floor	Larisa Iordache; Romania	Erika Fasana; Italy	Evgenia Shelgunova; Russia

== See also ==
- European Youth Olympic Festival
