= Tea Ugrin =

Italian artistic gymnast (born 1998)

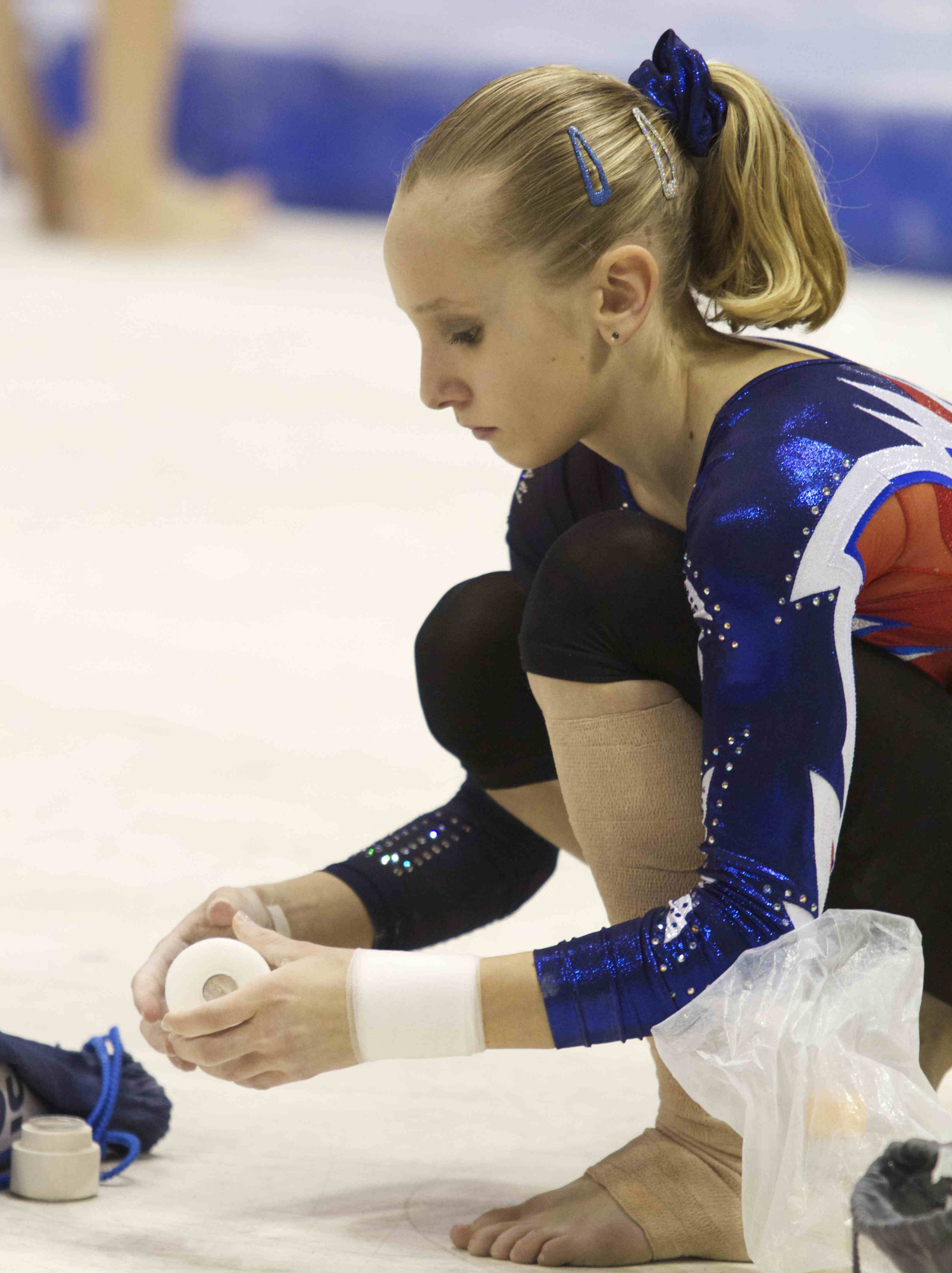
- Ugrin in 2013

Personal information
- Born: June 12, 1998 (age 28) Trieste, Italy

Gymnastics career
- Discipline: Women's artistic gymnastics
- Country represented: Italy; (2012-2016)
- Club: Artistica 81
- Head coaches: Diego Pecar, Teresa Macri
- Music: 2014–2015: "A Swan is Born" from Black Swan/ "Coda" from Swan Lake

Tea Ugrin (born 12 June 1998) is a Slovenian artistic gymnast from Italy. She is the 2013 and 2015 Italian all-around champion. She was a member of the silver medal winning team at the 2012 Junior European Championships, and she competed at the 2015 European Games and the 2015 World Championships.

== Gymnastics career ==
=== Junior ===
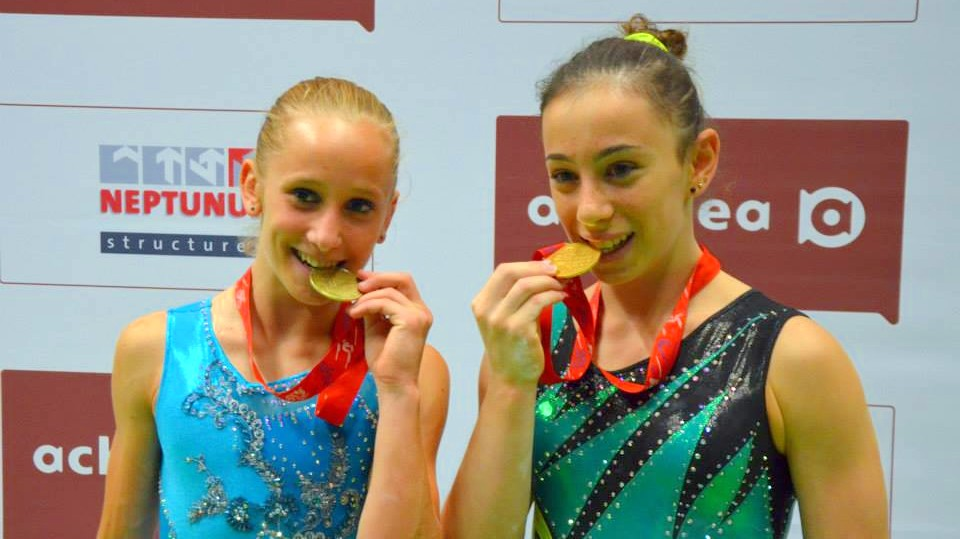
Ugrin (left) with Rizzelli at the 2013 European Youth Olympic Festival.

Ugrin made her international debut at the City of Jesolo Trophy where the junior Italian team won the silver medal behind the United States. She was selected to compete at the 2012 Junior European Championships alongside Elisa Meneghini, Enus Mariani, Lara Mori, and Alessia Leolini. They won the silver medal behind the Russian team, and individually, Ugrin tied for fourth place in the balance beam event final with Russian Evgenia Shelgunova.

At the 2013 City of Jesolo Trophy, the junior Italian team won the gold medal. Ugrin placed fourth in the all-around and on the balance beam. Then at the 2013 Italian Championships, Ugrin won the all-around, even beating the senior-level Italian gymnasts. She also won the gold medal on floor exercise and the bronze medal on the balance beam, and she placed fourth on the uneven bars. She was then selected to compete at the 2013 European Youth Summer Olympic Festival with Martina Rizzelli and Lara Mori, and they placed fifth in the team competition. Ugrin finished tenth in the all-around final and seventh in the floor exercise final. She won the bronze medal in the uneven bars final behind her teammate Rizzelli and France's Louise Vanhille.

=== Senior ===
==== 2014 ====
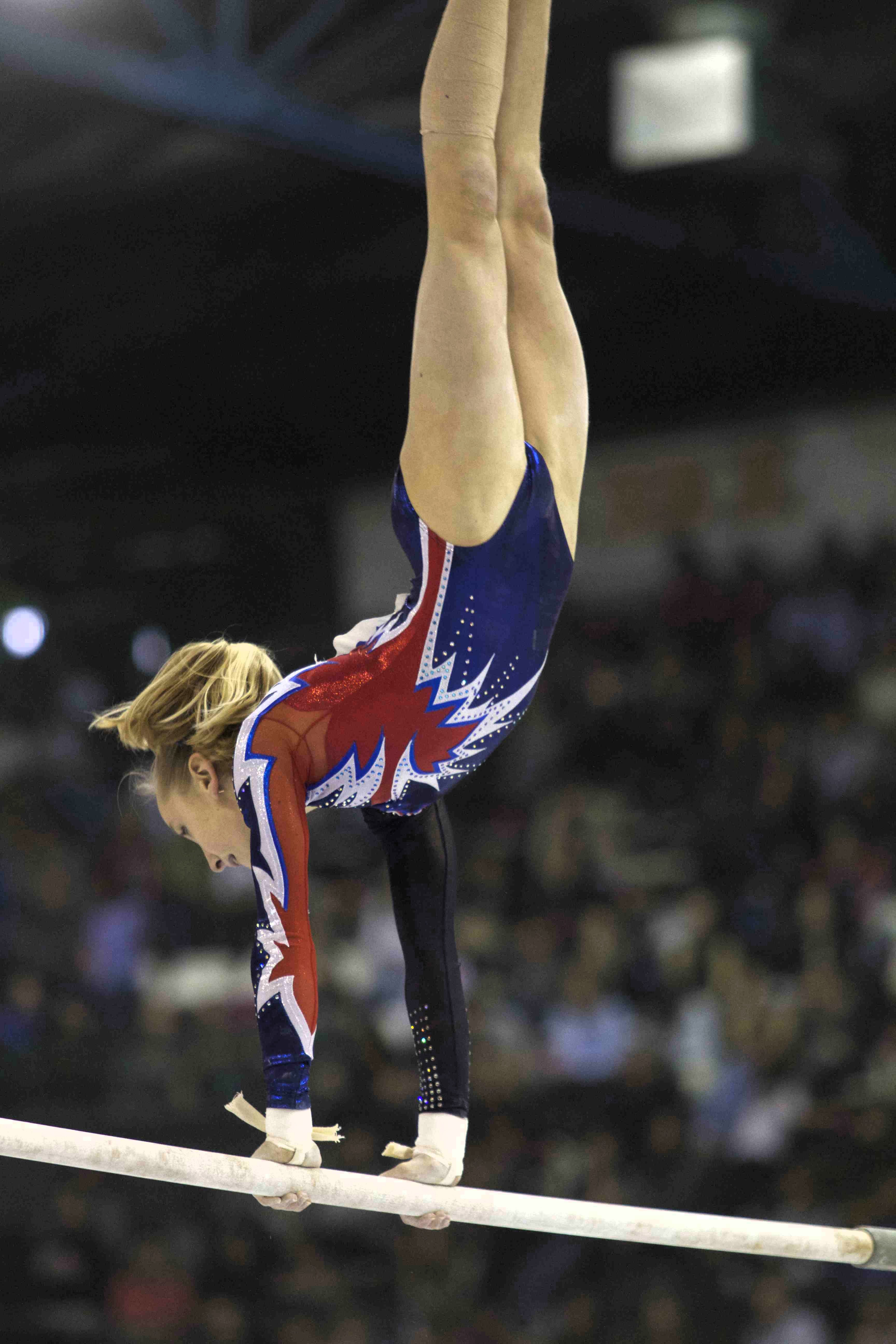
Ugrin competing on the uneven bars in 2013.

At the 1st Italian Serie A, Ugrin finished eleventh in the all-around, and her club, Artistica 81, finished seventh. Then at the 2nd Serie A, Ugrin had the second-highest score on the balance beam as her club finished sixth. At the 3rd Serie A, Ugrin had the second-highest score on the floor exercise and the fourth-highest all-around total, and Artistica 81 finished fifth. A foot injury kept her out of further competitions in 2014.

==== 2015 ====
Ugrin and Artistica 81 won the silver medal at the 1st and 2nd Serie A, both times behind Brixia. Then at the 3rd Serie A, they finished third behind Brixia and Lissone. At the City of Jesolo Trophy, the Italian team won silver, and she placed twentieth in the all-around. Then at the 4th Serie A, Ugrin had the highest score in the all-around with a total of 56.500, and Artistica 81 finished second behind Brixia. She then competed at the Four Nations Trophy- a competition between Italy, Russia, Romania, and Colombia. The Italian team finished second behind Russia, and Ugrin finished eleventh in the all-around.

Ugrin was then selected to represent Italy at the 2015 European Games with Giorgia Campana and Alessia Leolini, and they placed fifth in the team competition. Individually, Ugrin finished fifth in the all-around final and sixth in the uneven bars final. At the Golden League, Artistica 81 finished third behind Brixia and Lissone. In the event finals, Ugrin finished fifth on vault, sixth on uneven bars, and fourth on the balance beam.

At the 2015 Italian Championships, Ugrin won her second all-around national title. She then competed at the Novara Cup where the Italian team won the silver medal behind Romania. She was then selected to compete at the World Championships alongside Erika Fasana, Vanessa Ferrari, Carlotta Ferlito, Lara Mori, and Elisa Meneghini. The team finished seventh in the team final, and Ugrin finished fourteenth in the all-around final.

==== 2016–present ====
Artistica 81 finished fifth at the 2016 1st Serie A. Then at the 2nd Serie A, Ugrin had the second-highest score in the all-around and on uneven bars and the highest score on the balance beam, and her club finished second behind Brixia. She then competed at the 2016 City of Jesolo Trophy where the Italian team finished third behind the United States and Brazil. Ugrin finished eleventh in the all-around and seventh in the uneven bars event final. Ugrin withdrew from the 2016 Olympic Test Event due to minor injuries. Artistica 81 finished second at both the 3rd and the 4th Serie A. At the Italian Championships, Ugrin only competed on the uneven bars and balance beam, and she finished fifth in the uneven bars event final. In August, Ugrin had surgery on her foot, which took her out of contention for the 2016 Olympic Games.

Since 2017, Ugrin has only competed domestically in the Serie A on the uneven bars and the balance beam.

== Competitive history ==
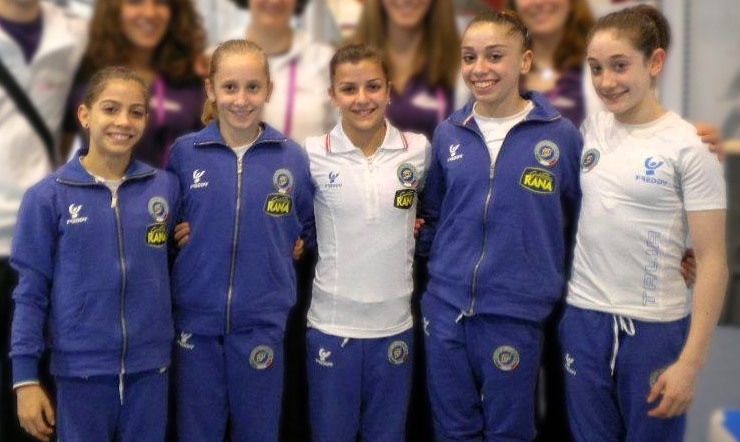
From left to right: Lara Mori, Tea Ugrin, Elisa Meneghini, Enus Mariani, and Alessia Leolini at the 2012 Junior European Championships.

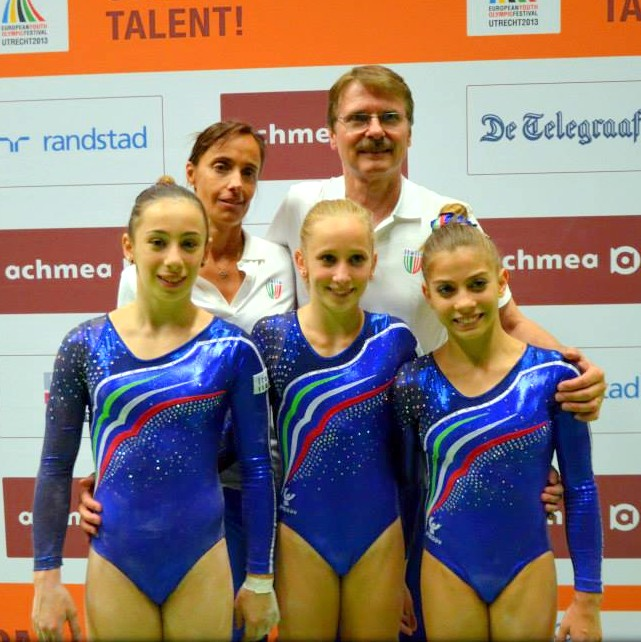
From left to right: Martina Rizzelli, Tea Ugrin, and Lara Mori at the 2013 European Youth Summer Olympic Festival.

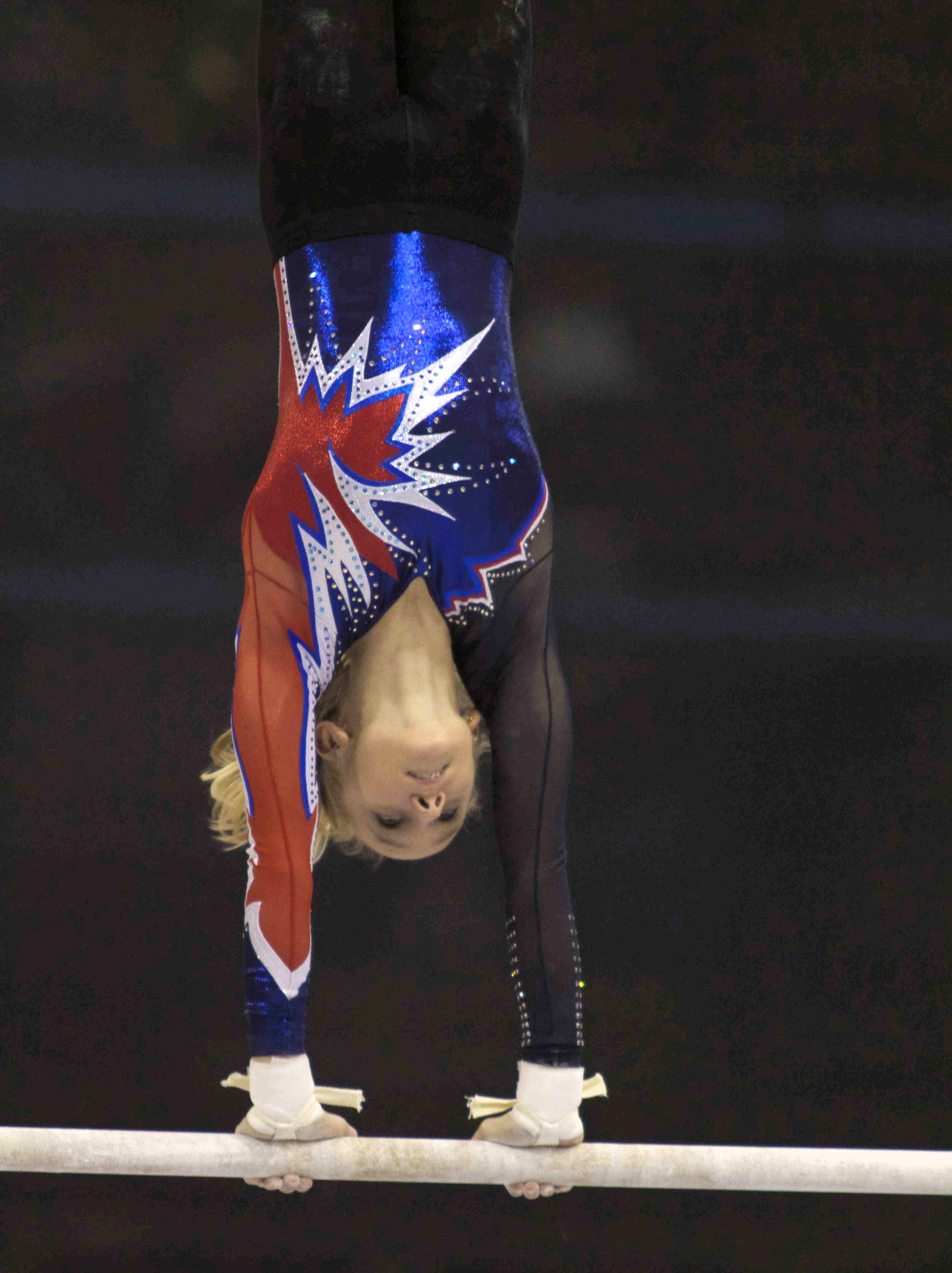
Ugrin on the uneven bars in 2013.

Competitive history of Tea Ugrin
Year	Event	Team	AA	VT	UB	BB	FX
2012	City of Jesolo Trophy	2nd place, silver medalist(s)					
2012	Junior European Championships	2nd place, silver medalist(s)				4	
2013	City of Jesolo Trophy	1st place, gold medalist(s)	4			4	
2013	Italian Championships		1st place, gold medalist(s)		4	3rd place, bronze medalist(s)	1st place, gold medalist(s)
2013	European Youth Olympic Festival	5	10		3rd place, bronze medalist(s)		7
2014	1st Italian Serie A Nationale	7					
2014	2nd Italian Serie A Nationale	6					
2014	3rd Italian Serie A Nationale	5					
2015	1st Italian Serie A Nationale	2nd place, silver medalist(s)					
2015	2nd Italian Serie A Nationale	2nd place, silver medalist(s)					
2015	3rd Italian Serie A Nationale	3rd place, bronze medalist(s)					
2015	City of Jesolo Trophy	2nd place, silver medalist(s)	20				
2015	4th Italian Serie A Nationale	2nd place, silver medalist(s)					
2015	ITA-RUS-ROU-COL Friendly	2nd place, silver medalist(s)	11				
2015	European Games	5	5		6		
2015	Golden League	3rd place, bronze medalist(s)	7	5	6	4	
2015	Italian Championships		1st place, gold medalist(s)		5	4	8
2015	Novara Cup	2nd place, silver medalist(s)	17				
2015	World Championships	7	14				
2016	1st Italian Serie A Nationale	5					
2016	2nd Italian Serie A Nationale	2nd place, silver medalist(s)					
2016	City of Jesolo Trophy	3rd place, bronze medalist(s)	11		7		
2016	3rd Italian Serie A Nationale	2nd place, silver medalist(s)					
2016	4th Italian Serie A Nationale	2nd place, silver medalist(s)					
2016	Italian Championships				5		
2017	1st Italian Serie A Nationale	2nd place, silver medalist(s)					
2017	2nd Italian Serie A Nationale	6					
2017	3rd Italian Serie A Nationale	5					
2018	1st Italian Serie A Nationale	10					
2018	2nd Italian Serie A Nationale	8					
2018	3rd Italian Serie A Nationale	4					
2019	1st Italian Serie A Nationale	4					
2019	2nd Italian Serie A Nationale	2nd place, silver medalist(s)					
2019	3rd Italian Serie A Nationale	2nd place, silver medalist(s)					
2020	1st Italian Serie A Nationale	5					
2020	2nd Italian Serie A Nationale	7					
2020	3rd Italian Serie A Nationale	6					
2021	2nd Italian Serie A Nationale	5					
2021	3rd Italian Serie A Nationale	8					
