= Gymnastics at the 2014 Summer Youth Olympics – Girls' uneven bars =

Girls' Balance Beam at the II Summer Youth Olympic Games
- Venue: Nanjing Olympic Sports Center Gymnasium
- Date: 23 August
- Competitors: 8 from 8 nations
- Winning score: 13.575

Medalists
1st place, gold medalist(s)		Seda Tutkhalyan	Russia
2nd place, silver medalist(s)		Iosra Abdelaziz	Italy
3rd place, bronze medalist(s)		Wang Yan	China

The Girl's uneven bars event final for the 2014 Summer Youth Olympics took place on 23 August at the Nanjing Olympic Sports Center Gymnasium.

== Medalists ==
Gold	Silver	Bronze
Seda Tutkhalyan; Russia	Iosra Abdelaziz; Italy	Wang Yan; China

== Qualification ==
The top eight gymnasts from qualification advanced into the final.

== Final ==
Rank	Gymnast	Difficulty	Execution	Penalty	Total
Gold medal	Seda Tutkhalyan (RUS)	5.6	7.975	—	13.575
Silver medal	Iosra Abdelaziz (ITA)	5.4	7.966	—	13.366
Bronze medal	Wang Yan (CHN)	5.5	7.566	—	13.066
4	Antonia Alicke (GER)	5.6	7.033	—	12.633
5	Sae Miyakawa (JPN)	5.1	7.333	—	12.433
6	Ava Verdeflor (PHI)	4.9	7.433	—	12.333
7	Laura Jurca (ROU)	5.2	5.933	—	11.133
8	Stephanie Hernandez (MEX)	4.9	5.533	—	10.433

== Reserves ==
The following gymnasts were reserves for the uneven bars final.

- Flávia Saraiva (BRA)
- Sydney Townsend (CAN)
- Boglárka Dévai (HUN)
