= Madison Desch =

American artistic gymnast

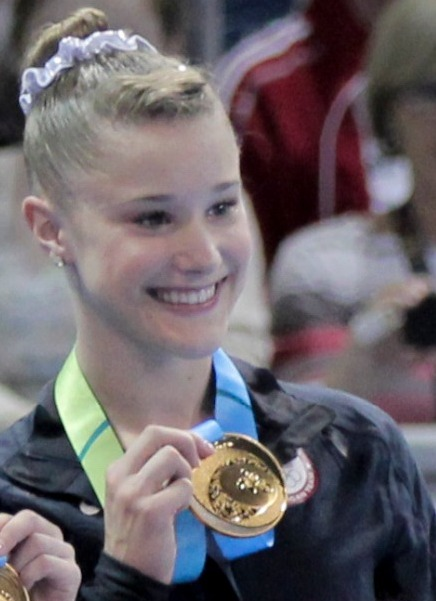
- Desch at the 2015 Pan American Games

Personal information
- Nickname: Maddie
- Born: August 25, 1997 (age 29) Kansas City, Missouri, U.S.
- Height: 5 ft 3 in (1.60 m)

Gymnastics career
- Discipline: Women's artistic gymnastics
- Country represented: United States (2011–14 (US))
- College team: Alabama Crimson Tide
- Club: Great American Gymnastics Express
- Head coaches: Al Fong and Armine Barutyan Fong
- Music: Lerneciner by Lavanda Trio (2011-2012)
- Retired: May 29, 2016
Medal record
Representing United States
World Championships
| Gold medal – first place | 2014 Nanning | Team |
Pan American Games
| Gold medal – first place | 2015 Toronto | Team |
| Silver medal – second place | 2015 Toronto | All-Around |
Pan American Championships
| Gold medal – first place | 2014 Mississauga | Team |

Madison "Maddie" Desch (born August 25, 1997) is a retired American artistic gymnast who was a member of the gold medal winning US team at the 2014 World Artistic Gymnastics Championships and 2015 Pan American Games. She competed on the gymnastics team at the University of Alabama where she accepted a full athletic scholarship to study beginning in 2016.

== Junior elite career ==
=== 2011 ===
Desch's elite debut was at the 2011 CoverGirl Classic. She tied for third on vault and placed eighth on balance beam. She finished ninth in the all-around, and qualified for the Junior National Championships.

At the 2011 Junior Visa Championships, Desch placed tied for seventh on vault, nineteenth on bars, seventeenth on beam, and fifth on floor exercise. She was added to the Junior National Team.

=== 2012 ===
At the start of the year, Desch competed at the City of Jesolo competition with teammates Katelyn Ohashi, Bailie Key, Lexie Priessman, and Amelia Hundley. The team won the gold medal, and Desch placed 5th in the all-around.

At the U.S. Secret Classic, she placed 2nd in the all-around behind Simone Biles.

At the Visa National Championships, Desch placed second in the all-around behind Lexie Priessman. She also became the balance beam junior national champion with a score of 29.150.

== Senior elite career ==
=== 2013 ===
Desch's senior debut was at the Secret US Classic. She only competed on balance beam, where she placed sixth.

At the P&G National Championships, she placed ninth in the all-around and fourth on floor exercise. However, she was not added back to the National team until the November training camp.

=== 2014 ===
At the City of Jesolo Trophy, she contributed to the USA's gold medal finish, and placed eighth in the all-around.

Desch competed two events at the 2014 Secret U.S. Classic, finishing 13th.

In August and September, Desch competed at the Pan American Championships in Mississauga, Canada. She helped the American team place first in the team competition. Individually, she placed fifth in the all-around competition with a score of 54.900.

Desch was selected to compete at the 2014 World Championships in Nanning, China, but she was later named the alternate.

=== 2015 ===
Desch competed at the 2015 City of Jesolo Trophy for the U.S. National team. On April 10, 2015, Desch announced that she was committed to the University of Alabama and their gymnastics team to do collegiate gymnastics.

On August 13, Desch competed at the P&G Championships where she competed on 3 events (not vault). She started on bars and scored a 13.100. However, Desch was invited to the Worlds training camp at the Karolyi Ranch.

On November 11, 2015, she signed the National Letter of Intent to the University of Alabama.

=== 2016 ===
On May 29, 2016, Desch announced her retirement from elite gymnastics via her personal Instagram account, citing a persistent back injury. She said she would focus instead on preparing for her collegiate career at the University of Alabama.

== NCAA career ==
=== 2017 ===
In her freshman season at the University of Alabama, Desch was named to the Scholastic All-American, All-SEC, and SEC All-Freshman team and scored a 9.95 on both vault and floor during the regular season. Alabama advanced to the NCAA Championship final (Super Six), ultimately placing sixth.

=== 2018 ===
In her sophomore season, Desch was named a Scholastic All-American and to the SEC Academic Honor Roll. Alabama again advanced to the NCAA Championships, but did not make the Super Six, after placing fifth in the semifinal. She matched her career-high 9.95 on floor against Arkansas in February 2018.

=== 2019 ===
In her junior season, Desch earned All-SEC honors for the second time, and was named a Scholastic All-American and to the SEC Academic Honor Roll. She earned a 9.9 on floor exercise at the SEC Championships, where Alabama posted a season-high score in the first session.
