= 2015 City of Jesolo Trophy =

- Venue: SGA Gymnasium Treviso
- Location: Jesolo, Italy
- Date: March 25, 2015 - March 29, 2015
- Website: www.sgagymnasium-treviso.it/trofeo-jesolo/

The 2015 City of Jesolo Trophy (Italian: Trofeo Citta Jesolo 2015) was the eighth edition of the City of Jesolo Trophy competition and was held March 25–29, 2015 at the SGA Gymnasium Treviso in Jesolo, Italy. Teams from Italy, the United States, Canada, Australia and France competed at the event.

== Medal table ==
Rank	Nation	Gold	Silver	Bronze	Total
1	United States	12	7	4	23
2	Italy	0	3	2	5
3	Canada	0	2	6	8
Totals (3 entries)		12	12	12	36

== Medalists ==
Event	Gold	Silver	Bronze
Senior
Team	United States; Alyssa Baumann; Simone Biles; Gabby Douglas; Bailie Key; Maggie Nichols; Aly Raisman; Kyla Ross	Italy; Erika Fasana; Carlotta Ferlito; Alessia Leolini; Elisa Meneghini; Martina Rizzelli; Tea Ugrin	Canada; Ellie Black; Hélody Cyrenne; Sabrina Gill; Isabela Onyshko; Audrey Rousseau; Sydney Townsend; Victoria-Kayen Woo
All-Around	Simone Biles (USA)	Bailie Key (USA)	Aly Raisman (USA)
Vault	Simone Biles (USA)	Arianna Rocca (ITA)	Ellie Black (CAN)
Uneven Bars	Kyla Ross (USA)	Bailie Key (USA)	Sabrina Gill (CAN)
Balance Beam	Simone Biles (USA)	Alyssa Baumann (USA)	Carlotta Ferlito (ITA)
Floor Exercise	Simone Biles (USA)	Erika Fasana (ITA)	Aly Raisman (USA)
Junior
Team	United States; Norah Flatley; Jazmyn Foberg; Laurie Hernandez; Victoria Nguyen; Ragan Smith; Olivia Trautman	Canada; Jade Chrobok; Shallon Olsen; Ana Padurariu; Megan Roberts; Meaghan Ruttan; Rose-Kaying Woo	Italy; Sofia Arosio; Sara Berardinelli; Clara Colombo; Francesca Linari; Michela Redemagni; Nicole Simionato
All-Around	Laurie Hernandez (USA)	Norah Flatley (USA)	Jazmyn Foberg (USA)
Vault	Jazmyn Foberg (USA)	Shallon Olsen (CAN)	Ragan Smith (USA)
Uneven Bars	Laurie Hernandez (USA)	Norah Flatley (USA)	Rose-Kaying Woo (CAN)
Balance Beam	Norah Flatley (USA)	Victoria Nguyen (USA)	Rose-Kaying Woo (CAN)
Floor Exercise	Laurie Hernandez (USA)	Ragan Smith (USA)	Megan Roberts (CAN)

== Results ==
=== Seniors ===
==== Team ====
Rank	Team	Vault (gymnastics)	Uneven bars	Balance beam	Floor (gymnastics)	Total
1st place, gold medalist(s)	United States	61.950	59.500	59.600	60.250	241.300
1st place, gold medalist(s)	Alyssa Baumann (USA)	15.350	14.250	15.000	14.100	241.300
1st place, gold medalist(s)	Simone Biles (USA)	15.950	15.050	15.150	15.950	241.300
1st place, gold medalist(s)	Gabby Douglas (USA)	15.300	14.600	14.900	14.100	241.300
1st place, gold medalist(s)	Bailie Key (USA)	15.200	14.900	14.400	15.000	241.300
1st place, gold medalist(s)	Maggie Nichols (USA)	15.300	14.600	14.150	13.450	241.300
1st place, gold medalist(s)	Aly Raisman (USA)	15.250	14.000	14.650	15.200	241.300
1st place, gold medalist(s)	Kyla Ross (USA)	15.400	14.950	14.900	11.500	241.300
2nd place, silver medalist(s)	Italy	58.050	55.900	55.500	54.900	224.350
2nd place, silver medalist(s)	Erika Fasana (ITA)	14.900	14.000	14.050	14.600	224.350
2nd place, silver medalist(s)	Carlotta Ferlito (ITA)	14.350	13.950	13.900	13.450	224.350
2nd place, silver medalist(s)	Alessia Leolini (ITA)	13.900	13.400	12.900	13.050	224.350
2nd place, silver medalist(s)	Elisa Meneghini (ITA)	14.200	12.400	14.050	12.850	224.350
2nd place, silver medalist(s)	Martina Rizzelli (ITA)	14.600	14.250	13.400	13.650	224.350
2nd place, silver medalist(s)	Tea Ugrin (ITA)	13.800	13.700	13.500	13.200	224.350
3rd place, bronze medalist(s)	Canada	56.250	56.300	55.100	54.100	221.750
3rd place, bronze medalist(s)	Ellie Black (CAN)	14.450	14.200	13.550	13.950	221.750
3rd place, bronze medalist(s)	Hélody Cyrenne (CAN)	13.900	13.350	12.100	13.050	221.750
3rd place, bronze medalist(s)	Sabrina Gill (CAN)	13.750	14.200	13.950		221.750
3rd place, bronze medalist(s)	Isabela Onyshko (CAN)	14.400	14.250	14.200	13.750	221.750
3rd place, bronze medalist(s)	Audrey Rousseau (CAN)	14.000	13.650	13.400	13.200	221.750
3rd place, bronze medalist(s)	Victoria-Kayen Woo (CAN)	14.050	13.450	12.800	13.200	221.750
4	France	56.450	54.950	54.400	53.850	219.650
4	Camille Bahl (FRA)	14.400	13.000	13.200	13.300	219.650
4	Marine Brevet (FRA)	13.950	13.400	14.000	13.900	219.650
4	Loan His (FRA)	14.100	14.250	12.550	13.350	219.650
4	Anne Kuhm (FRA)	14.000	13.400	13.800	13.300	219.650
4	Valentine Pikul (FRA)	13.600	13.900	13.400	12.950	219.650
4	Louise Vanhille (FRA)			12.450		219.650

==== All-around ====
Rank	Gymnast	Vault (gymnastics)	Uneven bars	Balance beam	Floor (gymnastics)	Total
1st place, gold medalist(s)	Simone Biles (USA)	15.950	15.050	15.150	15.950	62.100
2nd place, silver medalist(s)	Bailie Key (USA)	15.200	14.900	14.400	15.000	59.500
3rd place, bronze medalist(s)	Aly Raisman (USA)	15.250	14.000	14.650	15.200	59.100
4	Gabby Douglas (USA)	15.300	14.600	14.900	14.100	58.900
5	Alyssa Baumann (USA)	15.350	14.250	15.000	14.100	58.700
6	Erika Fasana (ITA)	14.900	14.000	14.050	14.600	57.550
7	Maggie Nichols (USA)	15.300	14.600	14.150	13.450	57.500
8	Megan Skaggs (USA)	15.100	14.150	14.000	13.900	57.150
9	Madison Desch (USA)	14.950	14.400	13.350	14.200	56.900
10	Kyla Ross (USA)	15.400	14.950	14.900	11.500	56.750
11	Isabela Onyshko (CAN)	14.400	14.250	14.200	13.750	56.600
12	Ellie Black (CAN)	14.450	14.200	13.550	13.950	56.150
13	Martina Rizzelli (ITA)	14.600	14.250	13.400	13.650	55.900
14	Carlotta Ferlito (ITA)	14.350	13.950	13.900	13.450	55.650
15	Marine Brevet (FRA)	13.950	13.400	14.000	13.900	55.250
16	Emily Schild (USA)	15.150	14.500	12.800	12.500	54.950
17	Anne Kuhm (FRA)	14.000	13.400	13.800	13.300	54.500
18T	Audrey Rousseau (CAN)	14.000	13.650	13.400	13.200	54.250
18T	Loan His (FRA)	14.100	14.250	12.550	13.350	54.250
20	Tea Ugrin (ITA)	13.800	13.700	13.500	13.200	54.200
21	Camille Bahl (FRA)	14.400	13.000	13.200	13.300	53.900
22	Valentine Pikul (FRA)	13.600	13.900	13.400	12.950	53.850
23T	Elisa Meneghini (ITA)	14.200	12.400	14.050	12.850	53.500
23T	Emily Little (AUS)	14.900	12.150	13.400	13.050	53.500
23T	Victoria-Kayen Woo (CAN)	14.050	13.450	12.800	13.200	53.500
26	Alessia Leolini (ITA)	13.900	13.400	12.900	13.050	53.250
27T	Hélody Cyrenne (CAN)	13.900	13.350	12.100	13.050	52.400
27T	Sydney Townsend (CAN)	13.750	12.200	13.400	13.050	52.400
29	Eliza Freeman (AUS)	13.950	12.700	11.850	12.300	50.800

==== Vault ====
Rank	Gymnast	#	A-score	B-score	Penalty	Scores	Average
Gold medal	Simone Biles (USA)	1	6.3	9.600	–	15.900	15.525
Gold medal	Simone Biles (USA)	2	5.6	9.550	–	15.150	15.525
Silver medal	Arianna Rocca (ITA)	1	5.8	9.100	–	14.900	14.500
Silver medal	Arianna Rocca (ITA)	2	5.0	9.100	–	14.100	14.500
Bronze medal	Ellie Black (CAN)	1	5.5	8.600	–	14.100	14.200
Bronze medal	Ellie Black (CAN)	2	5.4	8.900	–	14.300	14.200
4	Camille Bahl (FRA)	1	5.8	8.850	0.1	14.550	13.975
4	Camille Bahl (FRA)	2	4.6	8.800	–	13.400	13.975
5	Hélody Cyrenne (CAN)	1	5.0	8.850	–	13.850	13.575
5	Hélody Cyrenne (CAN)	2	4.6	8.700	–	13.300	13.575

==== Uneven bars ====
Rank	Gymnast	Difficulty	Execution	Penalty	Total
Gold medal	Kyla Ross (USA)	6.0	9.250	–	15.250
Silver medal	Bailie Key (USA)	6.1	9.050	–	15.150
Bronze medal	Sabrina Gill (CAN)	5.8	8.500	–	14.300
4	Erika Fasana (ITA)	5.6	8.600	–	14.200
5	Valentine Pikul (FRA)	5.7	8.350	–	14.050
6	Martina Rizzelli (ITA)	5.9	7.950	–	13.850
7	Loan His (FRA)	5.8	7.650	–	13.450
8	Isabela Onyshko (CAN)	6.1	7.150	–	13.250

==== Balance beam ====
Rank	Gymnast	Difficulty	Execution	Penalty	Total
Gold medal	Simone Biles (USA)	6.5	8.750	–	15.250
Silver medal	Alyssa Baumann (USA)	6.2	8.350	–	14.550
Bronze medal	Carlotta Ferlito (ITA)	5.8	8.500	–	14.300
4	Isabela Onyshko (CAN)	6.0	8.250	–	14.250
5	Marine Brevet (FRA)	5.9	8.300	–	14.200
6	Emma Nedov (AUS)	5.6	8.500	–	14.100
7	Ellie Black (CAN)	6.2	7.650	–	13.850
8	Elisa Meneghini (ITA)	5.7	7.400	–	13.100

==== Floor exercise ====
Rank	Gymnast	Difficulty	Execution	Penalty	Total
Gold medal	Simone Biles (USA)	6.8	9.250	–	16.050
Silver medal	Erika Fasana (ITA)	6.0	8.900	–	14.900
Bronze medal	Aly Raisman (USA)	6.3	8.850	0.3	14.850
4	Ellie Black (CAN)	5.7	8.650	0.1	14.250
5	Isabela Onyshko (CAN)	5.6	8.850	–	14.150
6	Martina Rizzelli (ITA)	5.7	8.200	–	13.900
7	Anne Kuhm (FRA)	5.1	8.200	0.1	13.200
8	Camille Bahl (FRA)	5.1	7.950	0.3	12.750

=== Juniors ===
==== Team ====
Rank	Team	Vault (gymnastics)	Uneven bars	Balance beam	Floor (gymnastics)	Total
1st place, gold medalist(s)	United States	58.000	55.750	58.200	57.150	229.100
1st place, gold medalist(s)	Norah Flatley (USA)	14.100	14.300	14.700	14.350	229.100
1st place, gold medalist(s)	Jazmyn Foberg (USA)	14.400	14.200	14.100	13.850	229.100
1st place, gold medalist(s)	Laurie Hernandez (USA)	14.450	14.400	14.300	14.500	229.100
1st place, gold medalist(s)	Victoria Nguyen (USA)	14.600	12.500	14.700	12.700	229.100
1st place, gold medalist(s)	Ragan Smith (USA)	14.450	12.850	14.500	14.300	229.100
1st place, gold medalist(s)	Olivia Trautman (USA)	14.500	12.700	14.000	14.000	229.100
2nd place, silver medalist(s)	Canada	58.200	53.300	55.700	55.250	222.450
2nd place, silver medalist(s)	Jade Chrobok (CAN)	14.250	13.350	13.300	13.850	222.450
2nd place, silver medalist(s)	Shallon Olsen (CAN)	14.600	12.750	13.350	13.800	222.450
2nd place, silver medalist(s)	Ana Padurariu (CAN)	13.750	13.300	14.350	13.550	222.450
2nd place, silver medalist(s)	Megan Roberts (CAN)	14.500	11.100	11.300	13.800	222.450
2nd place, silver medalist(s)	Meaghan Ruttan (CAN)	12.400	13.150	13.600	12.850	222.450
2nd place, silver medalist(s)	Rose-Kaying Woo (CAN)	14.600	13.500	14.400	13.800	222.450
3rd place, bronze medalist(s)	Italy	52.550	49.450	52.650	53.500	208.150
3rd place, bronze medalist(s)	Sofia Arosio (ITA)	12.600	12.050	13.150	11.900	208.150
3rd place, bronze medalist(s)	Sara Berardinelli (ITA)	13.200	11.600	12.250	12.950	208.150
3rd place, bronze medalist(s)	Clara Colombo (ITA)	12.550	12.050	12.350	13.400	208.150
3rd place, bronze medalist(s)	Francesca Linari (ITA)	13.550	12.850	13.300	13.400	208.150
3rd place, bronze medalist(s)	Michela Redemagni (ITA)	12.850	12.500	13.450	13.500	208.150
3rd place, bronze medalist(s)	Nicole Simionato (ITA)	12.950	11.500	12.750	13.200	208.150

==== All-around ====
Rank	Gymnast	Vault (gymnastics)	Uneven bars	Balance beam	Floor (gymnastics)	Total
1st place, gold medalist(s)	Laurie Hernandez (USA)	14.450	14.400	14.300	14.500	57.650
2nd place, silver medalist(s)	Norah Flatley (USA)	14.100	14.300	14.700	14.350	57.450
3rd place, bronze medalist(s)	Jazmyn Foberg (USA)	14.400	14.200	14.100	13.850	56.550
4	Rose-Kaying Woo (CAN)	14.600	13.500	14.400	13.800	56.300
5	Ragan Smith (USA)	14.450	12.850	14.500	14.300	56.100
6	Olivia Trautman (USA)	14.500	12.700	14.000	14.000	55.200
7	Ana Padurariu (CAN)	13.750	13.300	14.350	13.550	54.950
8	Jade Chrobok (CAN)	14.250	13.350	13.300	13.850	54.750
9	Victoria Nguyen (USA)	14.600	12.500	14.700	12.700	54.500
10	Shallon Olsen (CAN)	14.600	12.750	13.350	13.800	54.500
11	Francesca Linari (ITA)	13.550	12.850	13.300	13.400	53.100
12	Michela Redemagni (ITA)	12.850	12.500	13.450	13.500	52.300
13	Meaghan Ruttan (CAN)	12.400	13.150	13.600	12.850	52.000
14	Talia Folino (AUS)	14.150	11.150	13.250	12.950	51.500
15	Giorgia Villa (ITA)	13.400	13.350	11.850	12.700	51.300
16	Megan Roberts (CAN)	14.500	11.100	11.300	13.800	50.700
17	Nicole Simionato (ITA)	12.950	11.500	12.750	13.200	50.400
18	Emily Whitehead (AUS)	13.050	13.750	10.950	12.650	50.400
19	Clara Colombo (ITA)	12.550	12.050	12.350	13.400	50.350
20	Yasmin Collier (AUS)	13.700	11.600	11.850	13.100	50.250
21	Sara Berardinelli (ITA)	13.200	11.600	12.250	12.950	50.000
22	Asia D’Amato (ITA)	12.250	12.850	12.400	12.450	49.950
23	Sofia Arosio (ITA)	12.600	12.050	13.150	11.900	49.700
24	Alice D’Amato (ITA)	13.300	11.150	12.150	13.000	49.600

==== Vault ====
Rank	Gymnast	#	A-score	B-score	Penalty	Scores	Average
Gold medal	Jazmyn Foberg (USA)	1	5.8	9.100	–	14.900	14.600
Gold medal	Jazmyn Foberg (USA)	2	5.0	9.300	–	14.300	14.600
Silver medal	Shallon Olsen (CAN)	1	5.8	9.000	–	14.800	14.550
Silver medal	Shallon Olsen (CAN)	2	5.9	8.500	0.1	14.300	14.550
Bronze medal	Ragan Smith (USA)	1	5.8	8.700	–	14.500	14.350
Bronze medal	Ragan Smith (USA)	2	5.0	9.200	–	14.200	14.350
4	Francesca Linari (ITA)	1	5.0	8.800	–	13.800	13.550
4	Francesca Linari (ITA)	2	4.4	8.900	–	13.300	13.550
5	Talia Folino (AUS)	1	5.0	9.100	–	14.100	13.500
5	Talia Folino (AUS)	2	4.0	8.900	–	12.900	13.500
6	Yasmin Collier (AUS)	1	5.0	8.450	–	13.450	12.975
6	Yasmin Collier (AUS)	2	4.0	8.500	–	12.500	12.975

==== Uneven bars ====
Rank	Gymnast	Difficulty	Execution	Penalty	Total
Gold medal	Laurie Hernandez (USA)	5.8	8.700	–	14.500
Silver medal	Norah Flatley (USA)	5.7	8.550	–	14.250
Bronze medal	Rose-Kaying Woo (CAN)	5.5	8.550	–	14.050
4	Emily Whitehead (AUS)	5.6	8.400	–	14.000
5	Jade Chrobok (CAN)	5.3	8.100	–	13.400
6	Michela Redemagni (ITA)	5.0	8.350	–	13.350
7	Francesca Linari (ITA)	4.9	7.850	–	12.750
8	Talia Folino (AUS)	4.6	7.050	–	11.650

==== Balance beam ====
Rank	Gymnast	Difficulty	Execution	Penalty	Total
Gold medal	Norah Flatley (USA)	6.2	8.750	–	14.950
Silver medal	Victoria Nguyen (USA)	5.9	8.550	–	14.450
Bronze medal	Rose-Kaying Woo (CAN)	5.9	7.850	–	13.750
4	Yasmin Collier (AUS)	5.0	8.350	–	13.350
5	Michela Redmagni (ITA)	5.0	8.200	–	13.200
6	Ana Padurariu (CAN)	5.9	6.800	–	12.700
7	Francesca Linari (ITA)	5.5	7.100	–	12.600
8	Talia Folino (AUS)	4.9	6.850	–	11.750

==== Floor exercise ====
Rank	Gymnast	Difficulty	Execution	Penalty	Total
Gold medal	Laurie Hernandez (USA)	5.8	8.850	–	14.650
Silver medal	Ragan Smith (USA)	5.9	8.350	–	14.250
Bronze medal	Megan Roberts (CAN)	5.5	8.400	–	13.900
4	Jade Chrobok (CAN)	5.4	8.500	–	13.900
5	Clara Colombo (ITA)	4.9	8.600	–	13.500
6	Michela Redmagni (ITA)	5.1	8.350	–	13.450
7	Yasmin Collier (AUS)	5.3	6.150	–	11.450
8	Talia Folino (AUS)	4.2	6.200	–	10.400

== Participants ==
Gymnasts from Italy, the United States, Canada, Australia and France attended the event.

=== United States ===
==== Senior team ====
- Alyssa Baumann
- Simone Biles
- Madison Desch
- Gabrielle Douglas
- Bailie Key
- Maggie Nichols
- Alexandra Raisman
- Kyla Ross
- Emily Schild
- Megan Skaggs

==== Junior team ====
- Norah Flatley
- Jazmyn Foberg
- Laurie Hernandez
- Victoria Nguyen
- Ragan Smith
- Olivia Trautman

=== Italy ===
==== Senior team ====
- Erika Fasana
- Carlotta Ferlito
- Alessia Leolini
- Elisa Meneghini
- Martina Rizzelli
- Tea Ugrin

==== Junior team ====
- Sofia Arosio
- Sara Berardinelli
- Clara Colombo
- Francesca Linari
- Michela Redemagni
- Nicole Simionato

==== Young Dreams (Italy) ====
- Alice D’Amato
- Asia D’Amato
- Giorgia Villa

=== Canada ===
==== Senior team ====
- Ellie Black
- Helody Cyrenne
- Sabrina Gill
- Isabela Onyshko
- Audrey Rousseau
- Sydney Townsend
- Victoria-Kayen Woo

==== Junior team ====
- Jade Chrobok
- Shallon Olsen
- Ana Padurariu
- Megan Roberts
- Meaghan Ruttan
- Rose-Kaying Woo

=== France ===
==== Senior team ====
- Camille Bahl
- Marine Brevet
- Loan His
- Anne Kuhm
- Valentine Pikul
- Louise Vanhille

=== Australia ===
==== Senior team ====
- Eliza Freeman
- Georgia Godwin
- Emily Little
- Rianna Mizzen
- Kiara Munteanu
- Emma Nedov

==== Junior team ====
- Yasmin Collier
- Talia Folino
- Paige James
- Emi Watterson
- Emily Whitehead
