= City of Jesolo Trophy =

Women's gymnastics competition in Italy

The City of Jesolo Trophy is an annual women's gymnastics competition held in Jesolo, Italy. There are competitions for the senior division and junior division. The United States has won the senior team competition in 2008, 2010 to 2017, 2019 and 2022.

== Editions ==
Here is a list of team and individual winners throughout the Junior and Senior divisions.

City of Jesolo winners 2008–present
Year	Sr. Team	Jr. Team	Sr. All Around	Jr. All Around
2008	United States	United States	Shawn Johnson (USA)	Jordyn Wieber (USA)
2009	Italy	Italy	Lia Parolari (ITA)	Amelia Racea (ROU)
2010	United States	Russia	Aly Raisman (USA)	Anastasia Grishina (RUS)
2011	United States	United States	McKayla Maroney (USA)	Kyla Ross (USA)
2012	United States	United States	Kyla Ross (USA)	Lexie Priessman (USA)
2013	United States	Italy	Simone Biles (USA)	Bailie Key (USA)
2014	United States	United States	Kyla Ross (USA)	Bailie Key (USA)
2015	United States	United States	Simone Biles (USA)	Laurie Hernandez (USA)
2016	United States	n/a	Gabby Douglas (USA)	Jordan Chiles (USA)
2017	United States	United States	Riley McCusker (USA)	Gabby Perea (USA)
2018	Russia	Italy	Emma Malabuyo (USA)	Vladislava Urazova (RUS)
2019	United States	Russia	Sunisa Lee (USA)	Konnor McClain (USA)
2020	Canceled due to the COVID-19 pandemic in Italy			
2021	Canceled due to the COVID-19 pandemic in Italy			
2022	United States	United States	Konnor McClain (USA)	Tiana Sumanasekera (USA)
2023	Italy	Italy	Manila Esposito (ITA)	Gabrielle Hardie (USA)
2024	Italy	United States	Ellie Black (CAN) Alice D'Amato (ITA)	Giulia Perotti (ITA)
2025	Italy	United States	Manila Esposito (ITA)	Lavi Crain (USA)
2026	United States	United States	Elena Colas (FRA)	Louane Plisson (FRA)

=== 2008 ===
Event	Gold	Silver	Bronze
Senior
Team all-around	United States (USA); Shawn Johnson; Samantha Peszek; Chelsea Davis; Olivia Courtney; Jana Bieger; Bridget Sloan	Italy (ITA); Vanessa Ferrari; Lia Parolari; Carlotta Giovannini; Francesca Benolli; Monica Bergamelli; Sara Bradaschia	Spain (ESP); Lenika de Simone; Naomi Ruiz; Patricia Moreno; Laura Campos; Mercedes Alcaide
Individual all-around	Shawn Johnson (USA)	Vanessa Ferrari (ITA)	Samantha Peszek (USA)
Junior
Team all-around	United States (USA); Rebecca Clark; Rebecca Bross; Samantha Shapiro; Morgan Smith; Jordyn Wieber	Italy (ITA); Paola Galante; Elisabetta Preziosa; Andrea La Spada; Serena Licchetta	Romania (ROU); Ana Porgras
Individual all-around	Jordyn Wieber (USA)	Rebecca Bross (USA)	Paola Galante (ITA)

=== 2009 ===
Event	Gold	Silver	Bronze
Senior
Team all-around	Italy (ITA); Lia Parolari; Paola Galante; Emily Armi; Serena Licchetta; Eleonora Rando; Elisabetta Preziosa	Romania (ROU); Anamaria Tămârjan; Diana Chelaru; Sandra Izbașa; Daniela Druncea; Gabriela Drăgoi	Brazil (BRA); Bruna Leal; Ethiene Franco; Daniele Hypólito; Priscila Domingues; Ana Cláudia Silva; Khiuani Dias
Individual all-around	Lia Parolari (ITA)	He Ning (CHN)	Bruna Leal (BRA)
Junior
Team all-around	Italy (ITA); Carlotta Ferlito; Erika Fasana; Francesca Deagostini; Anita Rupini; Alessia Scantamburlo; Greta Carnessali	United Kingdom (GBR); Niamh Rippin; Nicole Hibbert; Danusia Francis; Elizabeth Beddoe; Jocelyn Hunt; Jennifer Pinches	Brazil (BRA); Janaína Silva; Anna Caroline Cardoso; Letícia Costa; Nadine Ourives
Individual all-around	Amelia Racea (ROU)	Carlotta Ferlito (ITA)	Erika Fasana (ITA)

=== 2010 ===
In 2010, the two events in the competition were the team all-around and individual all-around. The United States, Great Britain, Italy, and Russia competed in the senior division. The U.S. won the team competition. Russia was second and Italy third.

Aly Raisman of the U.S. won the senior all-around with a score of 57.650. Ksenia Semenova of Russia was second at 56.900. Vanessa Ferrari of Italy was one-tenth of a point lower to finish third.

In the junior all-around, Russia's Anastasia Grishina won the gold medal.

Event	Gold	Silver	Bronze
Senior
Team all-around	United States (USA); Aly Raisman; Morgan Smith; Amanda Jetter; Mackenzie Caquatto; Cassie Whitcomb; Kytra Hunter	Russia (RUS); Ksenia Semenova; Ekaterina Kurbatova; Ramilya Musina; Tatiana Solovyeva; Tatiana Nabieva; Anna Myzdrikova	Italy (ITA); Vanessa Ferrari; Elisabetta Preziosa; Paola Galante; Emily Armi; Eleonora Rando; Jessica Mattoni; Federica Macrì
Individual all-around	Aly Raisman (USA)	Ksenia Semenova (RUS)	Vanessa Ferrari (ITA)
Balance beam	Mackenzie Caquatto (USA)	Aly Raisman (USA)	Morgan Smith (USA)
Floor exercise	Aly Raisman (USA)	Vanessa Ferrari (ITA)	Ekaterina Kurbatova (RUS)
Uneven bars	Tatiana Nabieva (RUS)	Mackenzie Caquatto (USA)	Vanessa Ferrari (ITA)
Vault	Aly Raisman (USA)	Kytra Hunter (USA)	Mackenzie Caquatto (USA)
Junior
Team all-around	Russia (RUS); Anastasia Grishina; Anastasia Sidorova; Maria Paseka; Yulia Belokobylskaya; Violetta Malikova	Italy (ITA); Erika Fasana; Andrea Foti; Carlotta Ferlito; Francesca Deagostini; Giulia Leni; Greta Carnessali; Alessia Scantamburlo; Arianna Salvi; Alice Pozzobon	Japan (JPN); Yoshino Taniguchi; Asuka Teramoto; Risa Konishi; Mai Murakami; Mina Sugimura; Natsumi Sasada
Individual all-around	Anastasia Grishina (RUS)	Kyla Ross (USA)	Erika Fasana (ITA)

=== 2011 ===
In 2011, the U.S. repeated as team champions, outscoring Italy 232.250 to 212.800. Russia was third at 210.200.

In the individual all-around, the U.S. swept the top four spots. McKayla Maroney (57.850) won the gold medal, Jordyn Wieber (57.700) the silver, and Raisman (57.400) the bronze. Gabby Douglas was fourth. Maroney also won the vault title, while Raisman won on balance beam and tied for first on floor exercise.

The U.S. also won the junior team competition. Kyla Ross of the U.S. won the junior individual title.

Douglas, Maroney, Raisman, Ross, and Wieber later made up the U.S. squad nicknamed the "Fierce Five" that won the team competition gold medal at the 2012 Summer Olympics.

Event	Gold	Silver	Bronze
Senior
Team all-around	United States (USA); McKayla Maroney; Jordyn Wieber; Aly Raisman; Gabby Douglas; Amanda Jetter; Sabrina Vega	Italy (ITA); Carlotta Ferlito; Chiara Gandolfi; Giulia Leni; Carlotta Giovannini; Eleonora Rando	Russia (RUS); Yulia Belokobylskaya; Kristina Kruglikova; Diana Sapranova; Yulia Inshina; Maria Stepanova; Ekaterina Kurbatova
Individual all-around	McKayla Maroney (USA)	Jordyn Wieber (USA)	Aly Raisman (USA)
Vault	McKayla Maroney (USA)	Jordyn Wieber (USA)	Aly Raisman (USA)
Uneven bars	Bridgette Caquatto (USA)	Sabrina Vega (USA)	Jordyn Wieber (USA)
Balance beam	Aly Raisman (USA)	Jordyn Wieber (USA)	Gabby Douglas (USA)
Floor exercise	Aly Raisman (USA); Sabrina Vega (USA)	N/A	Gabby Douglas (USA)
Junior
Team all-around	United States (USA); Kyla Ross; Madison Kocian; Katelyn Ohashi; Lexie Priessman; Elizabeth Price; Ericha Fassbender	Russia (RUS); Anastasia Grishina; Anastasia Sidorova; Kristina Sidorova; Evgeniya Shelgunova; Anna Rodionova; Yulia Chemareva	Italy (ITA); Elisa Meneghini; Francesca Deagostini; Alessia Leolini; Greta Carnessali; Sara Ricciardi
Individual all-around	Kyla Ross (USA)	Madison Kocian (USA)	Katelyn Ohashi (USA)
Vault	Lexie Priessman (USA)	Kyla Ross (USA)	Elizabeth Price (USA)
Uneven bars	Anastasia Grishina (RUS)	Kyla Ross (USA); Katelyn Ohashi (USA)	N/A
Balance beam	Kyla Ross (USA)	Anastasia Sidorova (RUS)	Madison Kocian (USA)
Floor exercise	Katelyn Ohashi (USA)	Anastasia Sidorova (RUS)	Anastasia Grishina (RUS)

=== 2012 ===
The U.S. won the senior team competition again in 2012. Italy was second and Russia third.

For the second straight year, U.S. gymnasts earned the top four spots in the individual all-around competition. Ross, the junior champion in 2011, won the senior division title with a score of 59.850. Raisman was second at 59.050. Sarah Finnegan was third at 58.650. Maroney was fourth.

Ross won the uneven bars and balance beam competitions. Maroney repeated as the vault champion. Grishina won on floor.

In the junior division, the U.S. won the team title, and Lexie Priessman of the U.S. won the individual all-around.

Event	Gold	Silver	Bronze
Senior
Team all-around	United States (USA); Kyla Ross; Aly Raisman; Sarah Finnegan; McKayla Maroney; Elizabeth Price; Rebecca Bross	Italy (ITA); Carlotta Ferlito; Vanessa Ferrari; Francesca Deagostini; Giorgia Campana; Giulia Leni; Sara Ricciardi	Russia (RUS); Anastasia Grishina; Anna Rodionova; Yulia Inshina; Yulia Belokobylskaya
Individual all-around	Kyla Ross (USA)	Aly Raisman (USA)	Sarah Finnegan (USA)
Vault	McKayla Maroney (USA)	Elizabeth Price (USA)	Kyla Ross (USA)
Uneven bars	Kyla Ross (USA)	Brenna Dowell (USA)	Aly Raisman (USA)
Balance beam	Kyla Ross (USA)	Carlotta Ferlito (ITA)	Anastasia Grishina (RUS)
Floor exercise	Anastasia Grishina (RUS)	Aly Raisman (USA)	Sarah Finnegan (USA)
Junior
Team all-around	United States (USA); Lexie Priessman; Bailie Key; Madison Desch; Amelia Hundley; Katelyn Ohashi	Italy (ITA); Enus Mariani; Lara Mori; Tea Ugrin; Laura Guatelli; Nicole Terlenghi; Martine Buro	Russia (RUS); Maria Kharenkova; Maria Bondareva; Ekaterina Baturina; Viktoria Kuzmina
Individual all-around	Lexie Priessman (USA)	Enus Mariani (ITA)	Bailie Key (USA); Maria Kharenkova (RUS)
Vault	Lexie Priessman (USA)	Bailie Key (USA)	Amelia Hundley (USA)
Uneven bars	Katelyn Ohashi (USA)	Lexie Priessman (USA)	Enus Mariani (ITA)
Balance beam	Katelyn Ohashi (USA)	Enus Mariani (ITA)	Bianca Ciobanu (ROU)
Floor exercise	Maria Kharenkova (RUS)	Bailie Key (USA)	Lexie Priessman (USA)

=== 2013 ===
In the senior division, US once again won the team title. Italy's A team placed second, while Japan won bronze.

The United States' six senior gymnasts placed first through sixth in the all-around competition, with first-year senior Simone Biles winning gold with a score of 60.400, Kyla Ross taking silver with 58.650, and Brenna Dowell placing third with 56.650.

During the apparatus finals, Biles won three of the four available gold medals, placing first on vault, balance beam, and floor. Ross won the uneven bars title as well as the balance beam silver medal.

Junior Bailie Key of the United States won the all-around title, with Enus Mariani of Italy and Amelia Hundley of USA placing second and third, respectively. In the junior team final, Italy's A team won gold, while the country's B team took bronze. Japan's gymnasts won the silver.

Event	Gold	Silver	Bronze
Senior
Team all-around	United States (USA); Kyla Ross; Simone Biles; Lexie Priessman; Brenna Dowell; Maggie Nichols; Peyton Ernst	Italy (ITA); Vanessa Ferrari; Elisabetta Preziosa; Federica Macrì; Elisa Meneghini; Erika Fasana; Giorgia Campana	Japan (JPN); Asuka Teramoto; Mai Murakami; Wakana Inoue; Wakiko Ryu; Natsumi Sasada
Individual all-around	Simone Biles (USA)	Kyla Ross (USA)	Brenna Dowell (USA)
Vault	Simone Biles (USA)	Arianna Rocca (ITA)	Lexie Priessman (USA)
Uneven bars	Kyla Ross (USA)	Giorgia Campana (ITA)	Brenna Dowell (USA)
Balance beam	Simone Biles (USA)	Kyla Ross (USA)	Elisabetta Preziosa (ITA)
Floor exercise	Simone Biles (USA)	Maggie Nichols (USA)	Giulia Leni (ITA)
Junior
Team all-around	Italy (ITA); Enus Mariani; Tea Ugrin; Lavinia Marongiu; Martina Rizzelli; Sofia Busato; Sofia Bonistalli	Japan (JPN); Yuki Uchiyama; Aiko Sugihara; Wakana Yasui; Koko Dobashi; Marina Kawasaki	Italy (ITA); Chiara Imeraj; Giorgia Morera; Nicole Terlenghi; Alice Linguerri; Joana Favaretto; Pilar Rubagotti
Individual all-around	Bailie Key (USA)	Enus Mariani (ITA)	Amelia Hundley (USA)
Vault	Bailie Key (USA)	Nicole Terlenghi (ITA)	Aiko Sugihara (JPN)
Uneven bars	Enus Mariani (ITA)	Martina Rizzelli (ITA)	Bailie Key (USA)
Balance beam	Bailie Key (USA)	Lavinia Marongiu (ITA)	Amelia Hundley (USA)
Floor exercise	Bailie Key (USA)	Enus Mariani (ITA)	Sofia Bonistalli (ITA)

=== 2014 ===
The competition took place on the 22–23 March 2014. Teams from the US, Italy, Australia, Japan and Romania competed. The United States nearly swept the gold medals, missing out only on the senior beam title, which was won by Andreea Munteanu of Romania.

Event	Gold	Silver	Bronze
Senior
Team all-around	United States (USA); Alyssa Baumann; Madison Desch; Peyton Ernst; Maggie Nichols; Kyla Ross; MyKayla Skinner	Italy (ITA); Giorgia Campana; Erika Fasana; Lavinia Marongiu; Lara Mori; Martina Rizzelli	Japan (JPN); Natsumi Sasada; Wakana Inoue; Yuki Uchiyama; Chinami Otaki; Yasuha Matsumura; Minami Honda
Individual all-around	Kyla Ross (USA)	Peyton Ernst (USA)	Maggie Nichols (USA)
Vault	MyKayla Skinner (USA)	Alessia Leolini (ITA)	N/A
Uneven bars	Madison Kocian (USA)	Kyla Ross (USA)	Giorgia Campana (ITA)
Balance beam	Andreea Munteanu (ROM)	Elisa Meneghini (ITA); Alyssa Baumann (USA)	N/A
Floor exercise	MyKayla Skinner (USA)	Kyla Ross (USA)	Andreea Munteanu (ROM)
Junior
Team all-around	United States (USA); Jordan Chiles; Nia Dennis; Norah Flatley; Emily Gaskins; Bailie Key; Ragan Smith	Romania (ROU); Anda Butuc; Andreea Iridon; Laura Jurca; Ștefania Orzu; Asiana Peng; Andra Stoica	Italy (ITA); Iosra Abdelaziz; Sofia Busato; Desirée Carofiglio; Chiara Imeraj; Alice Linguerri; Pilar Rubagotti
Individual all-around	Bailie Key (USA)	Nia Dennis (USA)	Norah Flatley (USA)
Vault	Bailie Key (USA)	Jordan Chiles (USA)	Laura Jurca (ROU)
Uneven bars	Bailie Key (USA)	Nia Dennis (USA)	Marina Kawasaki (JPN)
Balance beam	Norah Flatley (USA)	Bailie Key (USA)	Andreea Iridon (ROU)
Floor exercise	Bailie Key (USA)	Laura Jurca (ROU)	Yuka Momiyama (JPN)

=== 2023 ===
Event	Gold	Silver	Bronze
Senior
Team all-around	Italy; Angela Andreoli; Alice D'Amato; Asia D'Amato; Manila Esposito; Martina Maggio; Giorgia Villa	South Korea; Eom Do-hyun; Lee Da-yeong; Lee Yun-seo; Shin Sol-yi; Yeo Seo-jeong	Spain; Laura Casabuena; Laia Font; Maia Llacer; Laia Masferrer; Ana Pérez; Alba Petisco
Individual all-around	Manila Esposito (ITA)	Alice D'Amato (ITA)	Angela Andreoli (ITA)
Vault	Yeo Seo-jeong (KOR)	Asia D'Amato (ITA)	Manila Esposito (ITA)
Uneven bars	Alice D'Amato (ITA)	Giorgia Villa (ITA)	Lee Yun-seo (KOR)
Balance beam	Cassie Lee (CAN)	Yeo Seo-jeong (KOR)	Laia Masferrer (ESP)
Floor exercise	Laura Casabuena (ESP)	Lee Da-yeong (KOR)	Sydney Turner (CAN)
Junior
Team all-around	Italy; Sara Caputo; Camilla Ferrari; Emma Fioravanti; Benedetta Gava; Naomi Pazon; Emma Puato	Japan; Iijima Ruka; Umemoto Sawa; Watanabe Remi	Germany; Maellys Alferi; Mara Dietz; Michaela Mühlhofer; Amalia Preuss Neudorf; Lisa Wötzel
Individual all-around	Gabrielle Hardie (USA)	Audrey Snyder (USA)	Emma Fioravanti (ITA)
Vault	Benedetta Gava (ITA)	Gabrielle Hardie (USA)	Audrey Snyder (USA)
Uneven bars	Gabrielle Hardie (USA)	Audrey Snyder (USA)	Camilla Ferrari (ITA)
Balance beam	Audrey Snyder (USA)	Gabrielle Hardie (USA) Iijima Ruka (JPN)	—N/a
Floor exercise	Emma Fioravanti (ITA)	Gabrielle Hardie (USA)	Umemoto Sawa (JPN)

=== 2024 ===
Event	Gold	Silver	Bronze
Senior
Team all-around	Italy; Angela Andreoli; Alice D'Amato; Asia D'Amato; Manila Esposito; Elisa Iorio	Brazil; Rebeca Andrade; Jade Barbosa; Andreza Lima; Carolyne Pedro; Flávia Saraiva; Júlia Soares	United States; Dulcy Caylor; Katelyn Jong; Eveylyn Lowe; Hezly Rivera; Tiana Sumanasekera
Individual all-around	(Italy) Alice D'Amato	(Canada) Ellie Black	(Italy) Asia D'Amato
Vault	(France) Ming van Eijken	(Germany) Karina Schönmaier	(Canada) Shallon Olsen
Uneven bars	(Brazil) Rebeca Andrade	(Italy) Alice D'Amato	(Germany) Elisabeth Seitz
Balance beam	(Brazil) Flávia Saraiva	(Brazil) Rebeca Andrade	(Italy) Asia D'Amato
Floor exercise	(Brazil) Flávia Saraiva	(Brazil) Júlia Soares	(Italy) Manila Esposito
Junior
Team all-around	United States; Addy Fulcher; Lavi Crain; Claire Pease; Tyler Turner	Italy; Angelica Finiguerra; Emma Fioravanti; Benedetta Gava; Artemisia Iorfino; Giulia Perotti; Emma Puato	Canada; Zoe Cadrin; Coralie Demers; Gabrielle Elise Fausto; Lia Monica Fontaine; Alyssa Guerrier-Calyxte
Individual all-around	(Italy) Giulia Perotti	(United States) Addy Fulcher	(United States) Claire Pease
Vault	(Italy) Benedetta Gava	(Italy) Emma Puato	(United States) Lavi Crain
Uneven bars	(United States) Claire Pease	(United States) Addy Fulcher	(Canada) Lia Monica Fontaine
Balance beam	(Italy) Giulia Perotti	(United States) Claire Pease	(Canada) Gabrielle Elise Fausto
Floor exercise	(Italy) Emma Fioravanti	(Italy) Giulia Perotti	(Brazil) Isabel Ramos

=== 2025 ===
Event	Gold	Silver	Bronze
Senior
Team all-around	Italy A Chiara Barzasi; Alice D'Amato; Manila Esposito; Emma Fioravanti; July Marano; Sofia Tonelli	United States; Dulcy Caylor; Tatum Drusch; Claire Pease; Simone Rose; Ashlee Sullivan	Italy B Rebecca Aiello; Nunzia Dercenno; Camilla Ferrari; Angelica Finiguerra; Artemisia Iorfino; Veronica Mandriota
Individual all-around	(Italy) Manila Esposito	(United States) Claire Pease	(United States) Ashlee Sullivan
Vault	(Germany) Karina Schönmaier	(Canada) Lia Monica Fontaine	(United States) Ashlee Sullivan
Uneven bars	(United States) Simone Rose	(United States) Claire Pease	(Italy) Nunzia Dercenno
Balance beam	(Italy) Manila Esposito	(Romania) Ana Bărbosu	(Italy) Alice D'Amato
Floor exercise	(Spain) Alba Petisco	(Romania) Ana Bărbosu	(Italy) Emma Fioravanti
Junior
Team all-around	United States; Charleigh Bullock; Lavi Crain; Addyson Fulcher; Caroline Moreau; Kylie Smith; Addalye VanGrinsven	Italy A Sofia Bianchi; Eleonora Calaciura; Vittoria Ferrarini; Sofia Frenna; Mia Proietti; Giulia Santinato	Italy B Alessia Cepparulo; Alessia Cortellino; Michelle Tapia; Caterina Salerno; Ludovica Usuelli
Individual all-around	(United States) Lavi Crain	(United States) Caroline Moreau	(Italy) Eleonora Calaciura
Vault	(United States) Lavi Crain	(Italy) Mia Proietti	(United States) Caroline Moreau
Uneven bars	(United States) Addyson Fulcher	(United States) Charleigh Bullock	(Canada) Samantha Couture
Balance beam	(United States) Caroline Moreau	(Italy) Eleonora Calaciura	(United States) Lavi Crain
Floor exercise	(United States) Caroline Moreau	(United States) Kylie Smith	(Germany) Madita Mayr

=== 2026 ===
Event	Gold	Silver	Bronze
Senior
Team all-around	United States; Charleigh Bullock; Reese Esponda; Greta Krob; Caroline Moreau; Simone Rose	France; Lola Chassat; Elena Colas; Perla Denéchère; Ming van Eijken; Maïana Prat; Célia Serber	Italy 2 Rebecca Aiello; Sofia Bianchi; Angelica Finiguerra; July Marano; Anthea Sisio; Sofia Tonelli
Individual all-around	(France) Elena Colas	(United States) Charleigh Bullock	(China) Li Rongjinyi
Vault	(Italy) Benedetta Gava	(France) Ming van Eijken	(Spain) Aitana Pachecon
Uneven bars	(France) Elena Colas	(United States) Charleigh Bullock	(United States) Caroline Moreau
Balance beam	(France) Maïana Prat	(Argentina) Isabella Ajalla	(United States) Simone Rose
Floor exercise	(United States) Reese Esponda	(France) Maïana Prat	(Italy) July Marano
Junior
Team all-around	United States; Amia Pugh-Banks; Kylie Smith; Addalye VanGrinsven; Sydney Williams	France; Caly Chayani; Chloé Jurado; Lilou Marliac; Kélia N’Diaye; Louane Plisson; Taïna Virlogeux	Italy; Giada di Pietro; Sofia Frenna; Emma Piccari; Clarissa Rinaldi; Rita Stefani; Michelle Tapia
Individual all-around	(France) Louane Plisson	(United States) Kylie Smith	(United States) Addalye VanGrinsven
Vault	(Italy) Giada di Pietro	(Romania) Aniela Tudor	(United States) Addalye VanGrinsven
Uneven bars	(France) Louane Plisson	(United States) Kylie Smith	(France) Chloé Jurado
Balance beam	(France) Louane Plisson	(United States) Sydney Williams	(Italy) Michelle Tapia
Floor exercise	(Italy) Martina Borsoi	(United States) Kylie Smith	(France) Louane Plisson
