= Elisa Meneghini =

Italian artistic gymnast

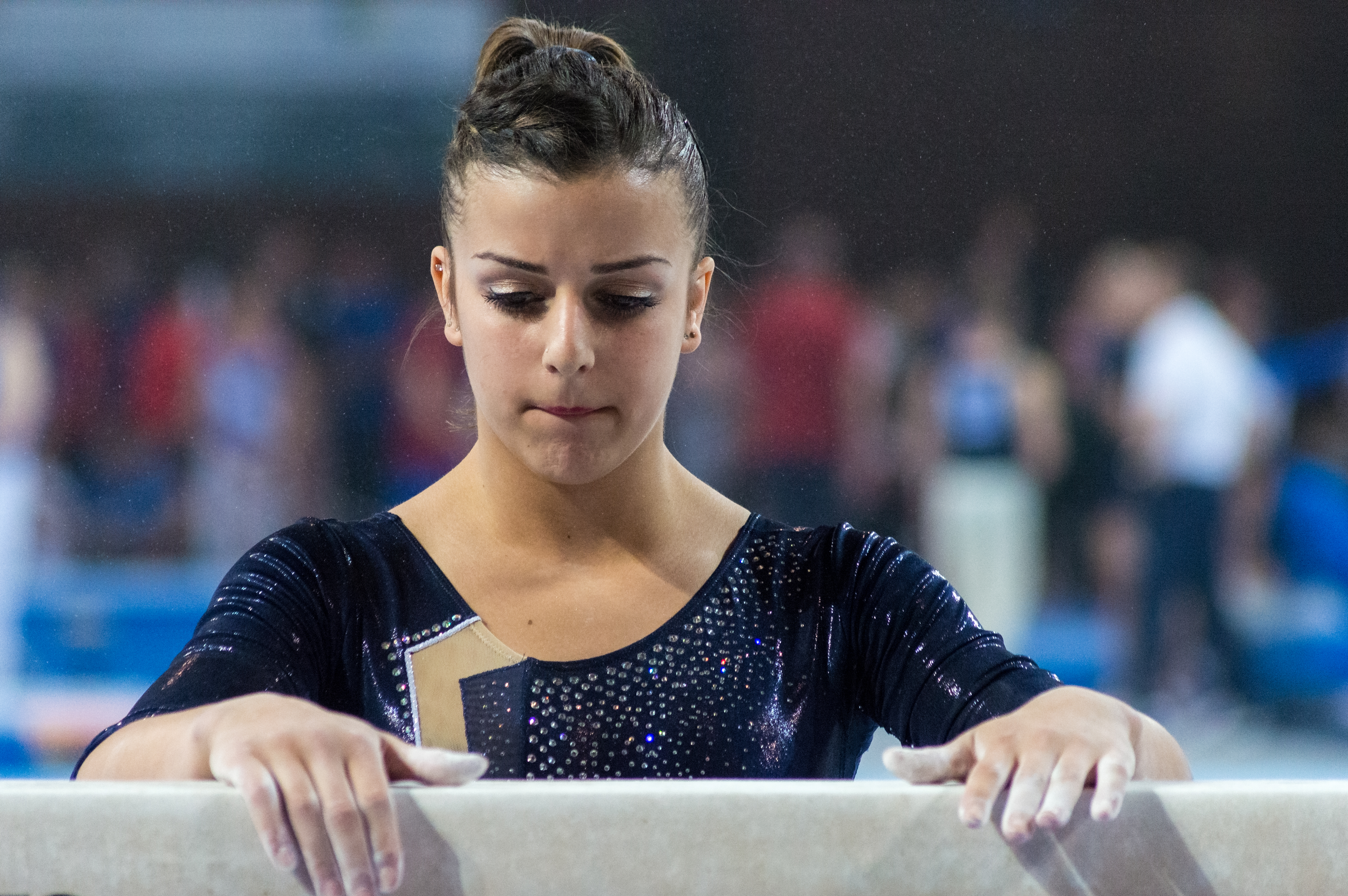
- Meneghini in 2015

Personal information
- Nickname: Mini
- Born: 24 July 1997 (age 29) Como, Italy
- Height: 153 cm (5 ft 0 in)

Gymnastics career
- Discipline: Women's artistic gymnastics
- Country represented: Italy (2013–2018)
Medal record
Women's artistic gymnastics
Representing Italy
Junior European Championships
| Silver medal – second place | 2012 Bruxelles | Team |
| Bronze medal – third place | 2012 Bruxelles | Balance beam |
FIG World Cup
Event / 1st / 2nd / 3rd; Apparatus World Cup / 1 / 0 / 0

Elisa Meneghini (born 24 July 1997) is an Italian former artistic gymnast who represented Italy at the 2016 Summer Olympics. She is the 2014 Italian champion in the all-around, floor exercise, and balance beam. As a junior, she won a silver medal in the team competition and a bronze medal on the balance beam at the 2012 European Championships.

== Gymnastics career ==
=== Junior ===
Meneghini helped Italy win the team event at the 2011 European Youth Olympic Festival. Individually, she won a bronze medal in the all-around behind Romania's Larisa Iordache and teammate Erika Fasana. She competed at the 2012 Junior European Championships alongside Enus Mariani, Lara Mori, Tea Ugrin, and Alessia Leolini, and they won the team silver medal behind Russia. Individually, she finished fourth in the all-around final and was only 0.075 points away from the bronze medalist Andreea Munteanu. She then won the bronze medal in the balance beam final, behind Maria Kharenkova and Munteanu. Additionally, she placed sixth in the vault final, seventh in the uneven bars final, and fifth in the floor exercise final.

=== Senior ===
Meneghini became age-eligible for senior-level competitions in 2013. She competed at the 2013 European Championships and advanced to the all-around final, finishing seventh. She also finished seventh in the balance beam final. She won the silver medal in the all-around at the 2013 Italian Championships behind Tea Ugrin.

Meneghini tied with Alyssa Baumann for the balance beam silver medal at the 2014 City of Jesolo Trophy. She competed on all four apparatuses in the team final of the 2014 European Championships to help the team finish fifth. She won the all-around title at the 2014 Italian Championships by three full points ahead of Iosra Abdelaziz. She won two more gold medals in the balance beam and floor exercise finals.

At the 2015 City of Jesolo Trophy, Meneghini won a silver medal with the Italian team. On the balance beam, she finished eighth. She won the silver medal in the all-around at the 2015 Italian Championships, behind Tea Ugrin. She competed on the vault and the floor exercise in the team final at the 2015 World Championships, where the Italian team finished seventh.

Meneghini finished eighth in the all-around at the 2016 Stuttgart World Cup. She competed with the Italian team that placed fifth at the 2016 European Championships. At the 2016 Italian Championships, she won the gold medal on the floor exercise, the silver medal on the balance beam, and the bronze medal in the all-around. As a result, she was selected to represent Italy at the 2016 Summer Olympics. She competed on the vault, balance beam, and floor exercise to help Italy place tenth in the team qualifications.

Meneghini won a gold medal on the floor exercise at the 2018 Doha World Cup in a three-way tie with Kim Su-jong and Axelle Klinckaert. This was the final international competition of her career, and she stopped competing domestically in 2020.

== Personal life ==
Meneghini with her teammates Carlotta Ferlito and Sophia Campana was part of the reality show Ginnaste - Vite parallele that aired on MTV Italia.

== Competitive history ==
| Year | Event | TF | AA | VT | UB | BB | FX |
|---|---|---|---|---|---|---|---|
| 2011 | 9th International City of Lugano Trophy | | 1st | 3rd | 1st | 2nd | 1st |
| 2011 | European Youth Olympic Festival | 1st | 3rd | | | | |
| 2012 | European Junior Championships | 2nd | 4 | 5 | 7 | 3rd | 5 |
| 2013 | City of Jesolo Trophy | 2nd | 7 | | | | |
| 2013 | Tokyo World Cup | | 7 | | | | |
| 2013 | European Championships | | 7 | | | 7 | |
| 2013 | Italian National Championships | | 2nd | | 5 | 6 | 5 |
| 2013 | Germany-Italy Friendly Meet | 1st | 3rd | | | | |
| 2014 | 1st Italian Serie A Nationale | 3rd | | | | | |
| 2014 | 2nd Italian Serie A Nationale | 5 | | | | | |
| 2014 | City of Jesolo Trophy | 2nd | 6 | | | 2nd | 4 |
| 2014 | 3rd Italian Serie A Nationale | 3rd | | | | | |
| 2014 | European Championships | 5 | | | | | |
| 2014 | Italian National Championships | | 1st | | 8 | 1st | 1st |
| 2014 | Novara Cup | 1st | | | | | |
| 2014 | Golden League | 2nd | 2nd | | 7 | 1st | 6 |
| 2015 | 1st Italian Serie A Nationale | 5 | | | | | |
| 2015 | 2nd Italian Serie A Nationale | 4 | | | | | |
| 2015 | 3rd Italian Serie A Nationale | 2nd | | | | | |
| 2015 | City of Jesolo Trophy | 2nd | 23 | | | 8 | |
| 2015 | World Championships | 7th | | | | | |
| 2015 | Elite Gym Massilia | 5th | 10th | | | | 4th |
