= Giorgia Campana =

Italian artistic gymnast

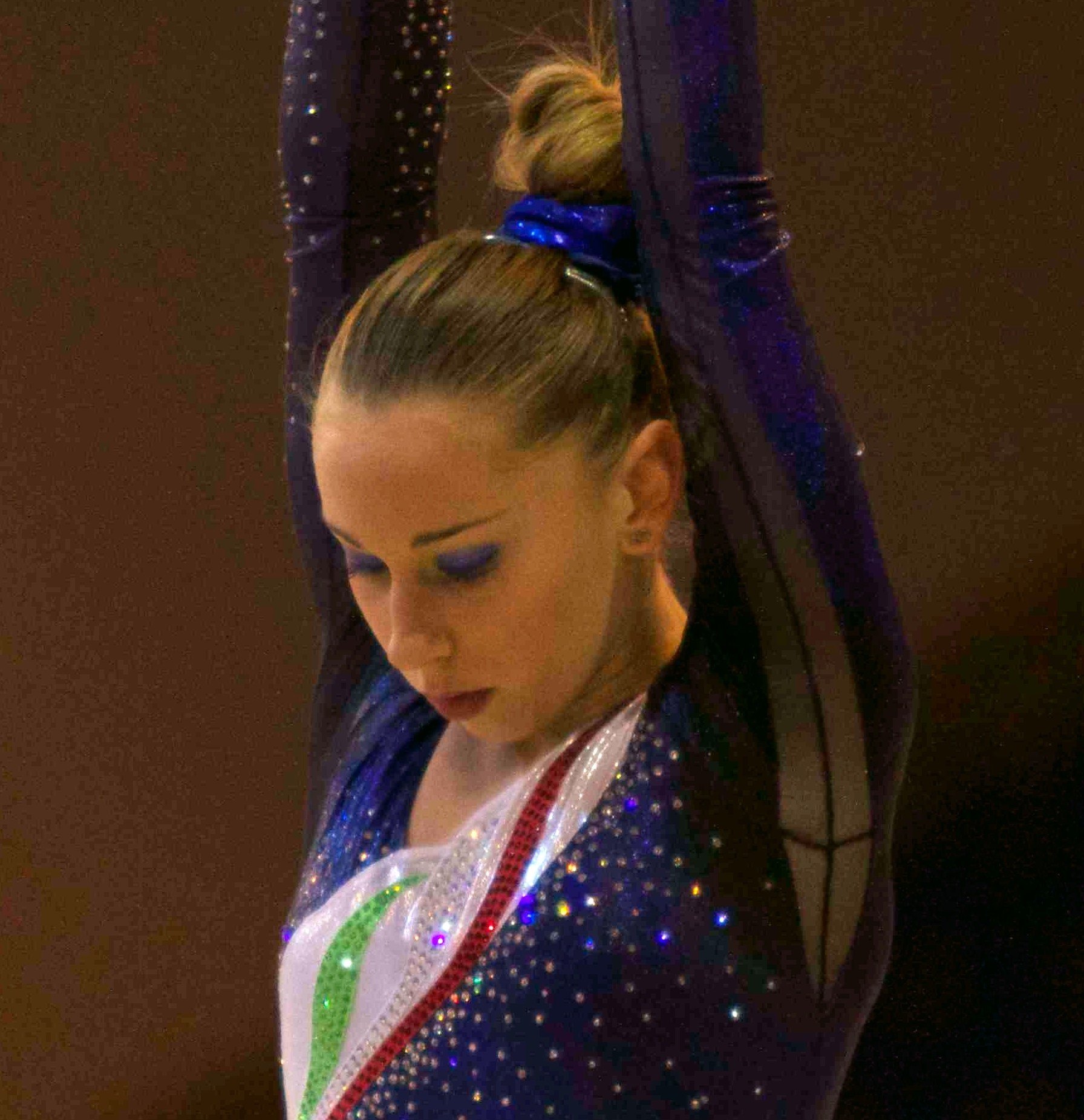
- Campana at the 2013 City of Jesolo Trophy

Personal information
- Nickname: Gio
- Born: 16 May 1995 (age 31) Rome, Italy
- Height: 151 cm (4 ft 11 in)

Gymnastics career
- Discipline: Women's artistic gymnastics
- Country represented: Italy
- Club: Centro Sportivo Esercito
- Gym: Nuova Tor Sapienza
- Head coach: Mauro Di Rienzo
- Choreographer: Chiara Fereazzi
- Music: "Bangkok" (2011-2013)
Medal record
Representing Italy
European Championships
Bronze medal – third place	2012 Brussels	Team
Mediterranean Games
Gold medal – first place	2013 Mersin	Team
Gold medal – first place	2013 Mersin	Balance beam
Bronze medal – third place	2013 Mersin	Uneven bars

Giorgia Campana (born 16 May 1995) is an Italian former artistic gymnast. She competed for her country at the 2012 Summer Olympics and won a bronze medal in the team event at the 2012 European Championships.

== Gymnastics career ==
Campana began gymnastics when she was seven years old.

=== 2011 ===
In May, Campana competed at the Italian Championships in Meda, Italy. She placed eighth in the all-around competition with a score of 51.450. In October, Campana competed at the World Championships in Tokyo, Japan. She contributed scores of 13.533 on uneven bars and 13.700 on balance beam towards the Italian team's ninth-place finish.

=== 2012 ===
In March, Campana competed at the City of Jesolo Trophy in Jesolo, Italy. She contributed an all-around score of 54.850 toward the Italian team's second-place finish. In May, Campana competed at the European Championships in Brussels, Belgium. In the team final, she scored 14.233 on the uneven bars which helped the Italian team win the bronze medal. In June, Campana competed at the Italian Championships in Catania, Italy. In event finals, she won the gold medal on uneven bars with a score of 14.200.

==== London Olympics ====
At the end of July, Campana competed at the 2012 Summer Olympics in London, United Kingdom. In the team final, she contributed an uneven bars score of 13.900 toward the Italian team's seventh-place finish.

=== 2013 ===
Campana won a silver medal on the uneven bars at the City of Jesolo Trophy behind Kyla Ross and also won a silver medal in the team event. She advanced to the uneven bars final at the European Championships and finished fifth, and she placed 11th in the all-around final. She then won the uneven bars title at the Italian Championships and also won the all-around bronze medal. At the Mediterranean Games, she helped Italy win the team gold medal. Individually, she won the gold medal on the balance beam and the bronze medal on the uneven bars. She could not compete at the World Championships after fracturing her elbow.

=== 2014 ===
At the City of Jesolo Trophy, Campana won a bronze medal on the uneven bars and a silver medal with the Italian team. She competed with the Italian team that finished fifth in the team final at the European Championships. Then at the Italian Championships, she won the uneven bars title. She helped Italy advance into the team final at the World Championships, where they also finished fifth. At the Elite Gym Massilia, she helped Italy win the team competition and won the silver medal in the all-around behind Russia's Daria Spiridonova.

=== 2015–2016 ===
Campana represented Italy at the 2015 European Games alongside Tea Ugrin and Alessia Leolini, and they placed fifth in the team competition. She won a silver medal on the uneven bars at the 2015 Italian Championships, behind Martina Rizzelli.

Campana helped Italy win the team bronze at the 2016 City of Jesolo Trophy. She competed at the Olympic Test Event and placed 23rd in the all-around. She then finished sixth in the all-around at the 2016 Italian Championships.

Campana retired from competition after not being selected for the 2016 Olympic team and began working as a coach.
