= Iosra Abdelaziz =

Italian artistic gymnast

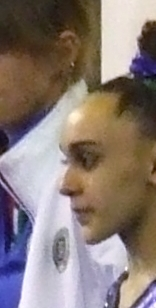
- Abdelaziz at the 2014 City of Jesolo Trophy

Personal information
- Nickname: Iosy
- Born: 7 December 1999 (age 26) Segrate, Italy
- Height: 1.51 m (4 ft 11 in)

Gymnastics career
- Discipline: Women's artistic gymnastics
- Country represented: Italy; (2014)
- Club: Bollate Sports Centre
- Retired: 2016
Medal record
Representing Italy
Youth Olympic Games
Silver medal – second place	2014 Nanjing	Uneven bars

Iosra Abdelaziz (born 7 December 1999) is an Italian former artistic gymnast. She represented Italy at the 2014 Summer Youth Olympics and won the silver medal on the uneven bars.

== Junior gymnastics career ==
Abdelaziz's international debut was at the 2014 International Gymnix in Montreal where she won a bronze medal with the Italian team. She also won a team bronze medal at the City of Jesolo Trophy. Additionally, she placed fifth on bars and eighth in the all-around. At the Munich Friendly, she won a bronze medal in the all-around and with the team. Then at the Junior European Championships, she helped the Italian team place fifth. She finished 18th in the all-around during the qualification round, but she did not advance into the final due to the two-per-country rule. Then, she won the silver medal in the all-around behind Elisa Meneghini at the Italian Championships in addition to bronze on the floor exercise.

Abdelaziz was selected to represent Italy at the 2014 Youth Olympics and was the youngest Italian athlete at the Games. She qualified fifth into the all-around final with a score of 53.150. In the all-around final, she finished sixth. She won the silver medal on the uneven bars behind Russia's Seda Tutkhalyan. She placed fourth on the balance beam and sixth on the floor exercise.

== Senior gymnastics career ==
Abdelaziz's senior debut was delayed due to an ankle injury in January 2015. She returned to competition at the 2015 2nd Italian Serie A2 where she scored a 13.250 on the uneven bars, and she scored a 13.000 at the 3rd Italian Serie A2. She then had surgery on her foot, and after this surgery, Abdelaziz only competed uneven bars at domestic competitions. In 2016, she competed at four Italian Serie A2 events, but her highest score was only an 11.900. She is now retired from gymnastics.

== Personal life ==
Abdelaziz is of Egyptian descent.

== Competitive history ==
Competitive history of Iosra Abdelaziz
Year	Event	Team	AA	VT	UB	BB	FX
2014	International Gymnix	3rd place, bronze medalist(s)	11	6	7		
2014	City of Jesolo Trophy	3rd place, bronze medalist(s)	8		5		
2014	Munich Friendly	3rd place, bronze medalist(s)	3rd place, bronze medalist(s)				
2014	Junior European Championships	5					
2014	Italian Championships		2nd place, silver medalist(s)		5	6	3rd place, bronze medalist(s)
2014	Youth Olympic Games		6		2nd place, silver medalist(s)	4	6
