= Sydney Townsend =

Canadian artistic gymnast

- Full name: Sydney Blair Townsend
- Nickname: Syd
- Born: December 24, 1999 (age 26) Burlington, Ontario

Gymnastics career
- Discipline: Women's artistic gymnastics
- Country represented: Canada; (2012–2017)
- Club: Milton Springers Gymnastics
- Head coaches: Craig Smith and Jessica LeBlanc
- Retired: May 8, 2018

Sydney Blair Townsend (born December 24, 1999) is a Canadian former artistic gymnast. She represented Canada at the 2014 Summer Youth Olympics and at the 2015 World Championships.

== Gymnastics career ==
At the 2014 Junior Pan American Championships, Townsend helped Canada win the team gold medal, and she qualified to represent Canada at the 2014 Summer Youth Olympics. There, she advanced to the all-around final and finished 12th. She also advanced to the vault and floor exercise finals, finishing seventh in both.

Townsend became age-eligible for senior competitions in 2015. She finished 11th in the all-around at the 2015 International Gymnix and also finished seventh in the floor final. At the 2015 City of Jesolo Trophy, she won a bronze medal with the Canadian team. She competed at the 2015 World Championships and helped Canada advance into the team final and thus earn an Olympic berth. She competed on the vault in the team final where Canada finished sixth. After the World Championships, she competed at the Toyota International and finished tenth on the vault and seventh on the balance beam.

Townsend joined the University of Michigan gymnastics team in the fall of 2017. She won the Big Ten Freshman of the Week award for week 2 after helping Michigan beat Ohio State with a career-highs 9.925 on the vault and 9.900 on the uneven bars. She helped Michigan win the 2018 Big Ten Conference Championships and was named to the All Big Ten Second Team.

In October 2018, Townsend was arrested for indecent or obscene conduct in public alongside assistant coach Scott Vetere. She then did not compete in the 2019 season and was removed from the roster prior to the 2020 season.
