= Lexie Priessman =

American artistic gymnast (born 1997)

- Full name: Alexis Amber Priessman
- Nickname: Lexie
- Born: January 23, 1997 (age 29)
- Height: 5 ft 6 in (168 cm)

Gymnastics career
- Discipline: Women's artistic gymnastics
- Country represented: United States (2010–13 (USA))
- College team: LSU Tigers (Class of 2019)
- Gym: Perfection Gymnastics
- Head coach: D-D Breaux
- Assistant coach: Jay Clark
- Former coaches: Mary Lee Tracy; Enrique Trabanino
- Choreographer: Dominic Zito
- Music: Quiero Montarme (2009-2010), Cumbia Jam/Africa Dream (2011-2012)
- Retired: April 20, 2019
Medal record
Representing United States
Jr. Pacific Rim Championships
Gold medal – first place	2012 Seattle	Team
Gold medal – first place	2012 Seattle	Vault
Silver medal – second place	2012 Seattle	All-Around

Alexis Amber "Lexie" Priessman (born January 23, 1997) is a former American artistic gymnast. She represented the U.S. in various international competitions and was a National Team member from 2010 through to 2013.

== Personal life ==
She was born in Cincinnati, Ohio, the daughter of Kraig and Vickie Priessman, and started training in gymnastics at the age of five. She is of Romanian Jewish descent. She has a brother Nicholas, a sister Jenna, and a twin sister Leah. Nicholas played baseball at Eastern Illinois University. Jenna was a member of the cheerleading team at the University of Cincinnati. Leah is an NFL cheerleader for the Cincinnati Bengals. She has multiple nieces and nephews.

Priessman attended Louisiana State University where she competed as a member of their college gymnastics team.

== Junior career ==
=== 2010 ===
Priessman made her national debut at the 2010 Nastia Liukin Supergirl Cup in Worcester, Massachusetts, where she won the all-around.

At the 2010 CoverGirl Classic in Chicago, IL, Priessman tied for second on vault with gymnast McKayla Maroney. She placed sixth all-around and on floor exercise, and she placed eighth on uneven bars.

Priessman placed second on vault at the 2010 U.S. Junior National Championships in Hartford, Connecticut, and she placed seventh on floor.

=== 2011 ===
In September, Priessman captured the all-around title (55.70) at the 2011 Japan Junior International in Yokohama, Japan. Competing her Amanar, she won the vault title with a meet-high score of 15.8. On balance beam (12.8), her skills included a standing full and a tucked full-in dismount. Her bars set (13.8) featured a giant full to Tkatchev, a toe-blind to Jaeger and a double layout dismount. On floor (13.30), she tumbled a double-double first pass, a 1 1/2 to 2 1/2, and a tucked full-in.

At the 2011 U.S. Junior Gymnastics Championships in St. Paul, Minnesota during August, Priessman claimed her first national vault title, with a two-night score of 31.55. She placed second on floor exercise (29.150) behind winner Katelyn Ohashi, and she tied for seventh on uneven bars with gymnast Amelia Hundley (27.45).

In July, Priessman claimed the junior vault title at the 2011 CoverGirl Classic Marshmallow Champion in Chicago, Illinois. She won the silver medals in the all-around and floor exercise. She also placed third on balance beam and eighth on bars.

In the junior division of the 2011 City of Jesolo Trophy in Jesolo, Italy, Priessman won vault and earned a share of the U.S. team gold medal. She placed fourth all-around and fifth on uneven bars. She also competed two new skills at the meet: a standing full and a tourjete half.

=== 2012 ===
At the Pacific Rim Championships in Everett, Washington, Priessman helped the USA team to win the gold medal ahead of China and Canada. Priessman finished second in the all-around with a 57.800. She earned a gold medal on vault scoring a 15.325, placed fourth on uneven bars and sixth on balance beam.

Priessman competed at the City of Jesolo Trophy in 2012. She helped the USA team to win the team gold medal ahead of Italy and Russia. Individually, Priessman won the all-around title with a 56.950. She placed first on vault with a 15.850, second on uneven bars scoring a 14.700 and third on floor exercise with a 14.200.

At the Secret US Classic in Chicago, IL, Priessman finished fourth in the all-around with a 57.050 in the junior session. She placed fifth on uneven barswith a 13.950, third on balance beam scoring a 14.300 and first on floor exercise with a 14.650.

At the 2012 U.S. Junior Gymnastics Championships, Priessman became the 2012 Junior US National Floor Exercise and All-Around Champion. She also earned silver medals on vault and uneven bars.

In October, Priessman verbally committed to the gymnastics program at the University of Georgia.

== Senior career ==
=== 2013 ===
Priessman competed at the Secret U.S Classic. She placed twelfth with a score of 43.900 because she didn't compete on beam. After, she was touted to compete at the P&G Championships. She was at the competition but didn't compete.

=== 2014 ===
Priessman decided to leave her gym, Cincinnati Gymnastics Academy. She had trained at CGA for 12 years. As of 2014, she was training at Perfection Gymnastics School with gym owner, Enrique Trabanino.

Priessman was scheduled to compete at the 2014 Secret U.S. Classic but withdrew due to injury.

Priessman officially signed to the LSU Lady Tigers gymnastics program on November 12, 2014, and planned to attend LSU, starting in fall 2015.

=== 2015 ===
On June 6, 2015, Priessman posted a photo on her Instagram account, announcing that she would be retiring from elite gymnastics and confirming her college attendance in the fall of this year. The photo is a photocollage of her and McKenna Kelley.

== College career ==
=== 2016 ===
Priessman joined the LSU program for the 2015–16 season. Academically, she planned to major in mass communication. She graduated from LSU in 2019 with her two roommates, Sarah Finnegan and McKenna Kelley. d
