= Francesca Deagostini =

Italian artistic gymnast

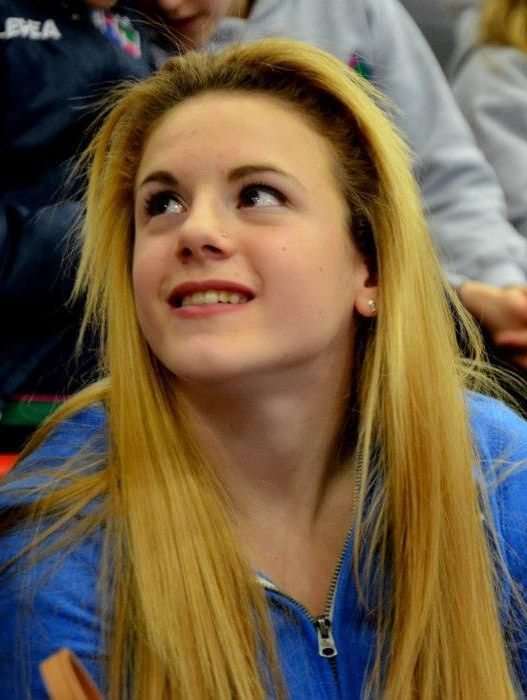

Personal information
- Born: August 5, 1996 (age 30) Aosta, Italy
- Height: 161 cm (5 ft 3 in)

Gymnastics career
- Discipline: Women's artistic gymnastics
- Country represented: Italy
- Head coach: Enrico Casella
- Assistant coach: Paolo Bucci
Medal record
European Championships
Bronze medal – third place	2012 Brussels	Team

Francesca Deagostini (born 5 August 1996) is an Italian artistic gymnast. She was an alternate for the Italian team at the 2012 Summer Olympics.

== Junior career ==
=== 2010 ===
At the end of April, Deagostini competed at the European Championships in Birmingham, United Kingdom. She contributed an all around score of 51.525 toward the Italian team's third-place finish.

=== 2011 ===
In May, Deagostini competed at the Italian Championships in Meda, Italy. She placed third in the all around competition with a score of 55.100. In event finals, she placed second on balance beam scoring 14.550, second on uneven bars scoring 13.850, and third on floor scoring 14.300.

== Senior career ==
=== 2012 ===
In January, Deagostini competed at the London Prepares series in London, United Kingdom. She helped the Italian team win first place which meant that they qualified a full team to the 2012 Summer Olympics. In event finals, she placed fifth on balance beam with a score of 14.133.

In May, Deagostini competed at the European Championships in Brussels, Belgium. She contributed a balance beam score of 14.300 toward the Italian team's third-place finish.
