= Martina Rizzelli =

Italian artistic gymnast

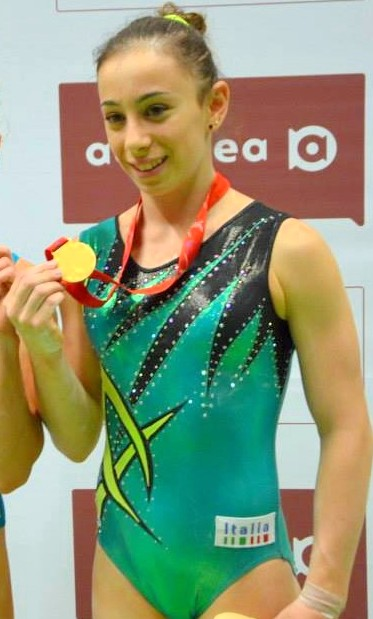
- Rizzelli at the 2013 European Youth Olympic Festival

Personal information
- Full name: Martina Rizzelli
- Nickname: Rizz
- Born: 24 March 1998 (age 28) Como, Italy
- Height: 1.53 m (5 ft 0 in)

Gymnastics career
- Discipline: Women's artistic gymnastics
- Country represented: Italy (2013–2019)
- Club: Brixia Brescia
- Head coach: Enrico Casella
- Retired: 2022
Medal record
Representing Italy
Summer Universiade
Bronze medal – third place	2019 Napoli	Team

Martina Rizzelli (born 24 March 1998) is an Italian former artistic gymnast who represented Italy at the 2016 Summer Olympics. She won a team bronze medal at the 2019 Summer Universiade and also competed at the 2014 and 2018 World Championships.

== Gymnastics career ==
Rizzelli made her international debut at the 2013 City of Jesolo Trophy and won a gold medal with the junior Italian team. Individually, she won a silver medal in the uneven bars final, which was held on her 15th birthday, behind teammate Enus Mariani. She finished fourth in the all-around at the 2013 Italian Championships. At the 2013 European Youth Olympic Festival, she won a gold medal on the uneven bars.

Rizzelli became age-eligible to compete at the senior level in 2014. She competed with the Italian team that finished fifth in the team final at the 2014 European Championships. She won a silver medal on the uneven bars at the 2014 Italian Championships and placed fifth in the all-around. She helped Italy advance into the team final at the 2014 World Championships, where they also finished fifth.

Rizzelli helped Italy win the silver medal to the United States at the 2015 City of Jesolo Trophy. At the 2015 European Championships, she advanced to the all-around final, where she finished ninth, and to the uneven bars final, where she finished sixth. After winning the uneven bars title at the Italian Championships, she was selected for the 2015 World Championships. However, she broke multiple bones in her foot, requiring surgery and had to withdraw from the team. After this injury, she stopped competing in the all-around and became primarily an uneven bars specialist.

Rizzelli returned to international competition at the 2016 European Championships and helped Italy finish fifth in the team final. She also advanced to the uneven bars final and finished eighth. After winning the uneven bars title and the vault silver medal at the Italian Championships, she was selected to represent Italy at the 2016 Summer Olympics. She competed on the vault and uneven bars to help Italy place tenth in the team qualifications.

Rizzelli missed most of the 2017 season due to a back injury. She competed with the Italian team that placed 12th at the 2018 World Championships. She won a bronze medal in the team event at the 2019 Summer Universiade alongside Carlotta Ferlito and Lara Mori. This ended up being the final competition of her career, as she broke her elbow in 2019. She announced her retirement in 2022.
