= Erika Fasana =

Italian artistic gymnast

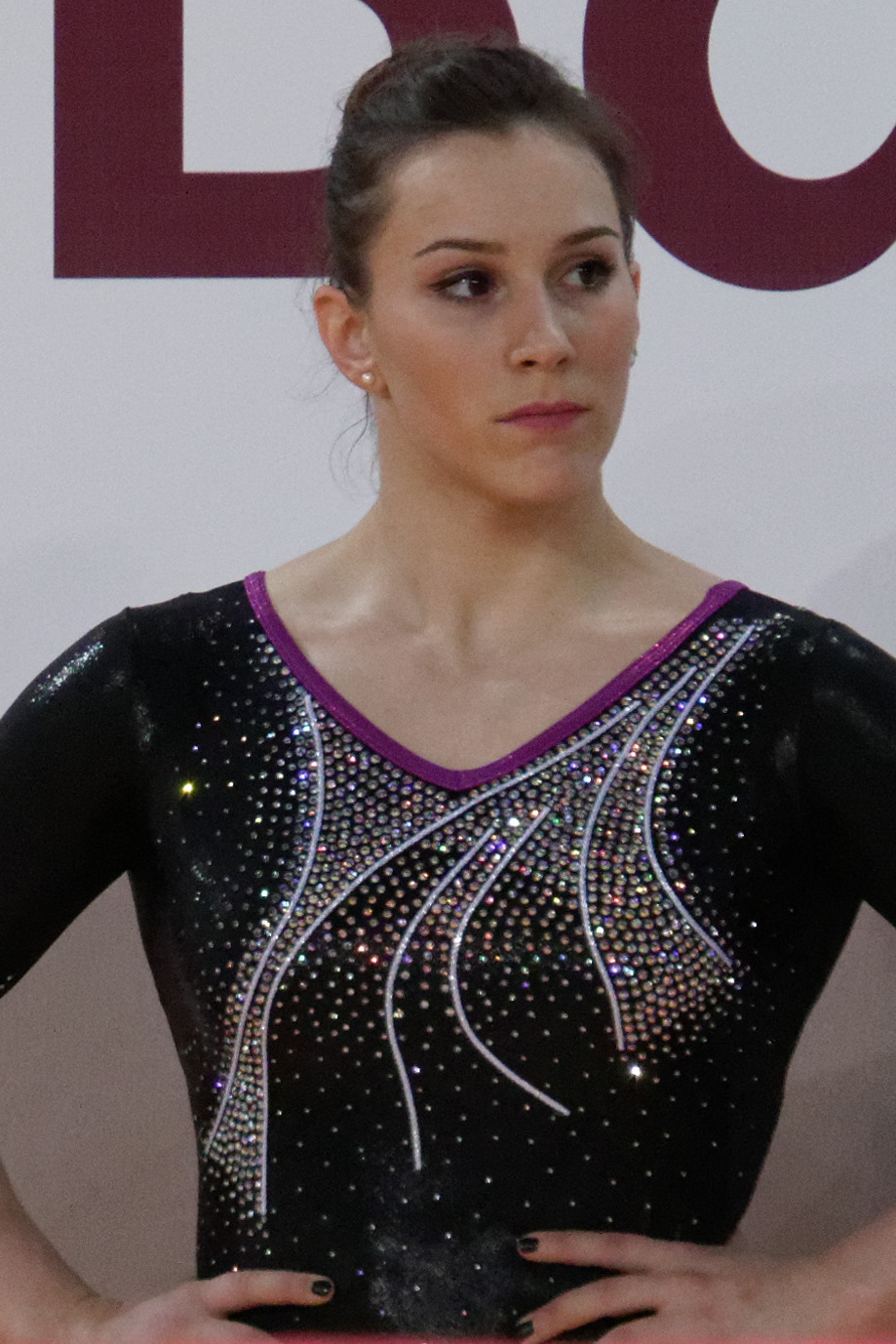
- Fasana in 2015

Personal information
- Born: 17 February 1996 (age 30) Como, Italy
- Height: 155 cm (5 ft 1 in)

Gymnastics career
- Discipline: Women's artistic gymnastics
- Country represented: Italy
- Club: Brixia Gymnastics
- Head coaches: Laura Rizzoli and Enrico Casella
- Music: Grieg's Piano (2008-2012) Master of puppets-Metallica (2013)
- Retired: March 2, 2021
Medal record
Representing Italy
European Championships
Bronze medal – third place	2012 Brussels	Team

Erika Fasana (born 17 February 1996) is an Italian artistic gymnast. She competed for her country at the 2012 Summer Olympics and the 2016 Summer Olympics. She is the first Italian gymnast to accomplish the "Chusovitina" on floor (full twisting double straight, H) and the second (after Vanessa Ferrari) to accomplish the "Silivas" (double double, H)

== Junior career ==
=== 2010 ===
In March, Fasana competed at the City of Jesolo Trophy in Jesolo, Italy. She placed third in the all around competition with a score of 56.050.

At the end of April, Fasana competed at the European Championships in Birmingham, United Kingdom. She contributed an all around score of 54.325 toward the Italian team's third-place finish and individually she placed fifth in the all around final with a score of 52.925. In event finals, she placed third on vault scoring 13.912, eighth on uneven bars scoring 11.575, and fifth on floor scoring 13.675.

=== 2011 ===
In July, Fasana competed at the European Youth Summer Olympic Festival in Trabzon, Turkey. She contributed an all around score of 55.300 toward the Italian team's first-place finish and individually she placed second in the all around final with a score of 55.450. In event finals, she placed third on vault scoring 14.088, third on uneven bars scoring 13.450, and second on floor scoring 13.525.

== Senior career ==
=== 2012 ===
In January, Fasana competed at the London Prepares series in London, United Kingdom. She contributed an all around score of 56.016 toward the Italian team's first-place finish which meant that they qualified a full team for the Olympics. In event finals, Fasana placed sixth on vault with a score of 13.708.

In May, Fasana competed at the European Championships in Brussels, Belgium. She contributed an all around score of 56.799 toward the Italian team's third-place finish. In event finals, she placed seventh on vault with a score of 14.003. Fasana said, "The main reason for our medal was the team, first of all. We support each other and were determined to do our best. We were sure that, even if we have to do our routine alone, we always have strong support from all the team, juniors, seniors and all the coaches."

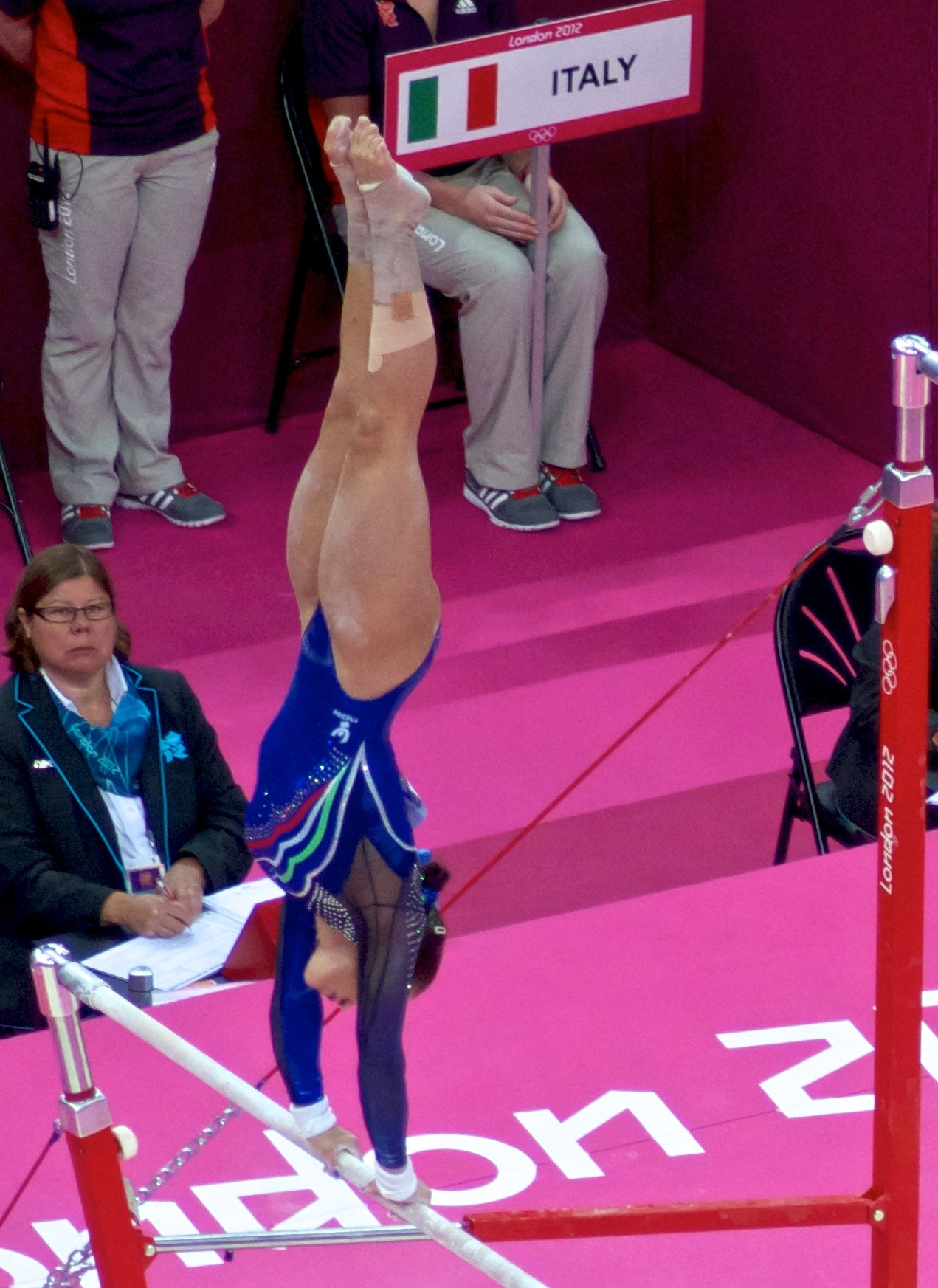
Fasana competing on the uneven bars during qualification at the 2012 Summer Olympics on 29 July 2012

==== London Olympics ====
At the end of July, Fasana competed at the 2012 Summer Olympics in London, United Kingdom. In qualifications, she placed thirtieth all around with a score of 53.965. In the team final, Fasana contributed scores of 13.733 on vault, 13.600 on uneven bars, and 14.233 floor toward the Italian team's seventh-place finish.

=== 2015 ===
Fasana competed at the American Cup in March 2015, winning the bronze.
