= Alessia Leolini =

Italian artistic gymnast

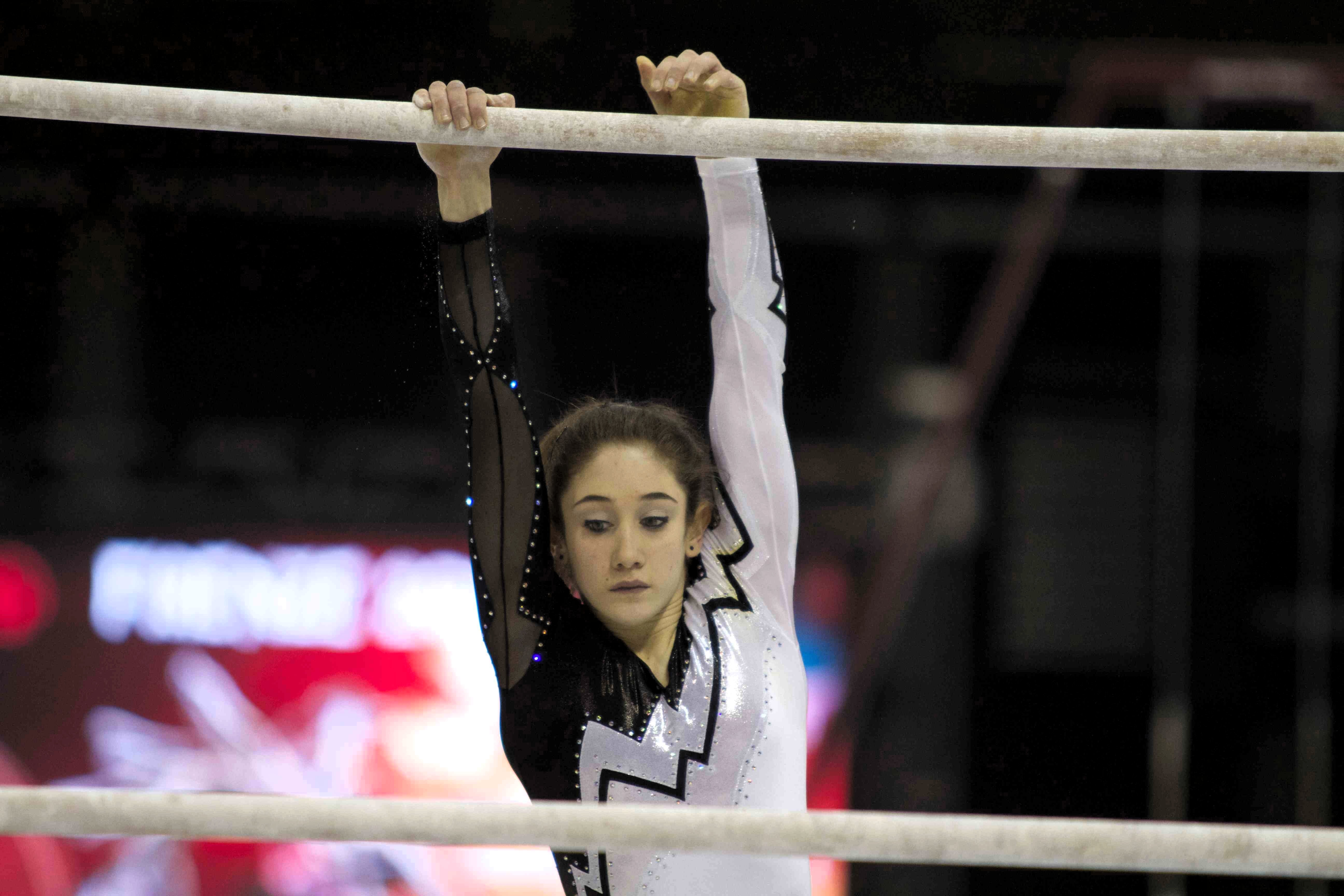
- Leolini at the 2013 City of Jesolo Trophy

Personal information
- Full name: Alessia Leolini
- Born: February 3, 1997 (age 29) Montevarchi, Italy

Gymnastics career
- Discipline: Women's artistic gymnastics
- Country represented: Italy
- Gym: Ginnica Giglio
- Head coach: Stefania Bucci
- Retired: September 29, 2016
Medal record
Women's artistic gymnastics
Representing Italy
City of Jesolo Trophy
Silver medal – second place	2014 Jesolo	Vault
Silver medal – second place	2015 Jesolo	Team
Bronze medal – third place	2016 Jesolo	Team

Alessia Leolini (born 3 February 1997) is an Italian artistic gymnast.

== Early life ==
Leolini was born in Montevarchi, Italy in 1997.

== Gymnastics career ==
=== Junior ===
Leolini competed at various national competitions in 2010 and 2011. She made her international debut at the 2011 City of Jesolo Trophy, in which Italy placed third in team finals. In November Leolini competed at the Top Gym Invitational in Belgium where she placed second in the all-around behind Evgeniya Shelgunova of Russia. She also won silver on uneven bars and floor exercise.

In 2012 Leolini competed at the junior European Championships where Italy won silver in the team final.

=== Senior ===
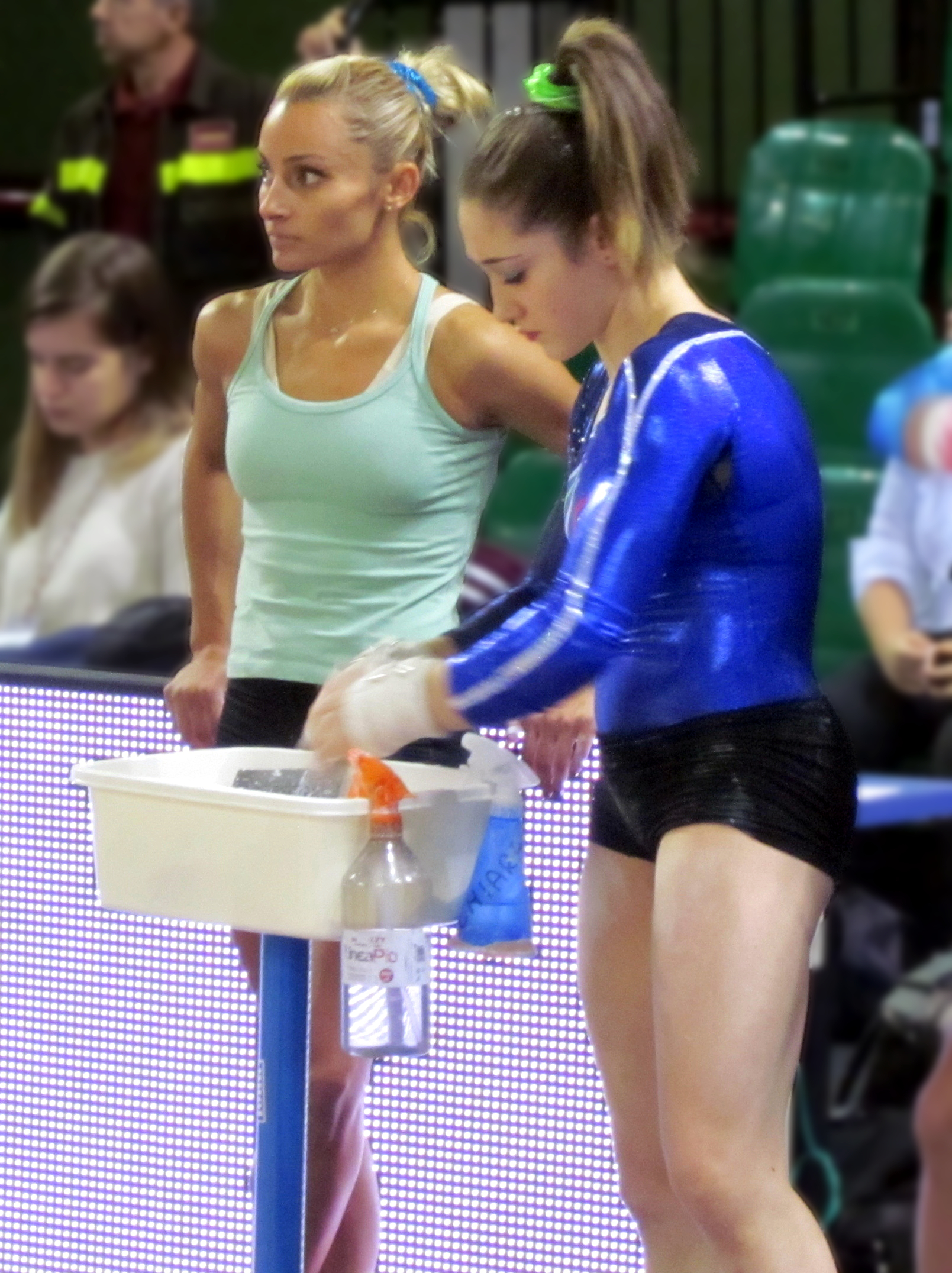
Leolini & Greek Vasiliki Millousi (left) in 2013

Leolini became senior in 2013. She competed at the 2013 World Championships. She placed 22nd in vault qualifications and did not qualify to the final.

Leolini competed at the 2014 City of Jesolo Trophy where she placed second on vault behind MyKayla Skinner of the US. She also placed 22nd in the all-around.

In 2015 Leolini competed at the European Games where Italy placed fifth in the team final.

== Competitive history ==
Year	Event	Team	AA	VT	UB	BB	FX
Junior
2011	1st Italian Serie A2	2nd place, silver medalist(s)					
2011	City of Jesolo Trophy	3rd place, bronze medalist(s)					
2011	Top Gym		2nd place, silver medalist(s)		2nd place, silver medalist(s)		2nd place, silver medalist(s)
2012	1st Italian Serie A	6					
2012	European Championships	2nd place, silver medalist(s)					
2012	Italian Championships						5
Senior
2013	1st Italian Serie A	8					
2014	1st Italian Serie A	5					
2014	2nd Serie A Nationale	2nd place, silver medalist(s)					
2014	City of Jesolo Trophy		21	2nd place, silver medalist(s)			
2014	3rd Serie A Nationale	7					
2014	Italian Championships		12	2nd place, silver medalist(s)	7		
2015	1st Serie A Nationale	4					
2015	2nd Serie A Nationale	3rd place, bronze medalist(s)					
2015	3rd Serie A Nationale	5					
2015	City of Jesolo Trophy	2nd place, silver medalist(s)	26				
2015	4th Serie A Nationale	8					
2015	Four Nations Trophy	2nd place, silver medalist(s)	8				
2015	European Games	5					
2015	Golden League	4	13				
2015	Italian Championships		12				
2016	1st Italian Serie A	3rd place, bronze medalist(s)	10				
2016	2nd Italian Serie A	4	7				
2016	City of Jesolo Trophy	3rd place, bronze medalist(s)	21	4			
2016	3rd Italian Serie A	3rd place, bronze medalist(s)	6				
2016	4th Italian Serie A	4	5				
