= Gymnastics at the 2015 European Games – Women's artistic individual all-around =

Women's artistic individual all-around at the 2015 European Games
- Venue: National Gymnastics Arena
- Dates: 18 June
- Competitors: 18 from 18 nations

Medalists
gold medal	(Russia) Aliya Mustafina
silver medal	(Switzerland) Giulia Steingruber
bronze medal	(Netherlands) Lieke Wevers

The Women's artistic gymnastics individual all-around competition at the 2015 European Games was held in the National Gymnastics Arena, Baku on 18 June 2015.

== Qualification ==
The top 18 gymnasts with one per country qualified for the all-around final.

Rank	Gymnast	Nation	Vault (gymnastics)	Uneven bars	Balance beam	Floor (gymnastics)	Total	Qual.
1	Aliya Mustafina	Russia	15.133	15.200	14.566	13.966	58.865	Q
2	Seda Tutkhalyan	Russia	14.966	14.166	14.600	13.600	57.332	
3	Viktoria Komova	Russia	14.566	14.866	14.233	13.300	56.965	
4	Giulia Steingruber	Switzerland	15.466	13.066	14.400	13.633	56.565	Q
5	Sophie Scheder	Germany	14.033	15.000	14.133	13.266	56.432	Q
6	Lieke Wevers	Netherlands	13.533	13.600	14.066	13.900	55.099	Q
7	Tea Ugrin	Italy	13.900	13.766	13.533	13.566	54.765	Q
8	Valentine Pikul	France	14.100	13.433	13.433	13.600	54.566	Q
9	Céline van Gerner	Netherlands	13.800	13.900	13.700	13.000	54.400	
10	Marine Brevet	France	14.133	13.033	13.600	13.266	54.032	
11	Dorina Böczögő	Hungary	14.066	13.366	12.766	13.566	53.764	Q
12	Noémi Makra	Hungary	14.066	14.466	12.466	12.400	53.398	
13	Kelly Simm	Great Britain	14.233	12.933	12.533	13.600	53.299	Q
14	Anne Kuhm	France	13.900	12.800	13.666	12.766	53.132	
15	Giorgia Campana	Italy	13.833	12.766	13.400	13.100	53.099	
16	Gaelle Mys	Belgium	13.866	12.100	13.500	13.600	53.066	Q
17	Andreea Iridon	Romania	12.566	13.733	14.100	12.600	52.999	Q
18	Elisabeth Seitz	Germany	14.033	15.000	11.033	12.866	52.932	
19	Alessia Leolini	Italy	14.166	13.366	12.166	12.766	52.464	
20	Gabriela Janik	Poland	14.400	13.233	12.566	12.166	52.365	Q
21	Laura Jurca	Romania	14.800	10.433	13.400	13.700	52.333	
22	Lisa Verschueren	Belgium	13.700	13.400	11.633	13.600	52.333	
23	Katarzyna Jurkowska-Kowalska	Poland	13.666	11.900	13.033	13.366	51.965	
24	Charlie Fellows	Great Britain	13.966	13.700	10.966	13.166	51.798	
25	Cindy Vandenhole	Belgium	13.833	13.366	11.166	13.333	51.698	
26	Tutya Yılmaz	Turkey	13.866	11.333	13.700	12.633	51.532	Q
27	Lisa Top	Netherlands	14.133	13.566	11.833	12.000	51.532	
28	Vasiliki Millousi	Greece	13.233	12.933	13.600	11.700	51.466	Q
29	Ainhoa Carmona	Spain	13.900	12.366	12.833	12.233	51.332	Q
30	Georgina Hockenhull	Great Britain	13.533	11.166	13.833	12.600	51.132	
31	Silvia Zarzu	Romania	14.333	10.500	11.966	13.933	50.732	
32	Leah Griesser	Germany	13.133	12.566	11.766	13.166	50.631	
33	Jessica Diacci	Switzerland	13.800	12.900	11.333	12.566	50.599	
34	Marina Nekrasova	Azerbaijan	13.566	11.300	12.966	12.700	50.532	Q
35	Angelina Kysla	Ukraine	13.733	13.566	11.433	11.700	50.432	Q
36	Ana Pérez	Spain	13.600	12.100	11.800	12.833	50.333	
37	Tzuf Feldon	Israel	13.000	12.133	12.966	12.200	50.299	Q
38	Barbora Mokošová	Slovakia	13.933	11.166	12.333	12.600	50.032	Q
39	Ana Đerek	Croatia	13.866	10.600	12.900	12.600	49.966	R1
40	Jasmin Mader	Austria	13.800	12.500	10.466	12.666	49.432	R2
41	Veronika Cenková	Czech Republic	12.600	11.366	12.800	12.166	48.932	R3
42	Valērija Grišāne	Latvia	13.500	10.266	12.433	12.600	48.799	R4

== Results ==
Oldest and youngest competitors

	Name	Country	Date of birth	Age
Youngest	Laura Jurca	Romania	September 14, 1999	15 years, 9 months and 4 days
Oldest	Vasiliki Millousi	Greece	May 4, 1984	31 years, 1 month and 14 days

Rank	Gymnast	Vault (gymnastics)	Uneven bars	Balance beam	Floor (gymnastics)	Total
1st place, gold medalist(s)	Aliya Mustafina (RUS)	14.866	15.500	14.500	13.700	58.566
2nd place, silver medalist(s)	Giulia Steingruber (SUI)	15.600	13.133	13.766	14.200	56.699
3rd place, bronze medalist(s)	Lieke Wevers (NED)	13.700	13.966	13.533	13.866	55.065
4	Sophie Scheder (GER)	13.900	13.766	14.233	13.033	54.932
5	Tea Ugrin (ITA)	13.566	13.833	13.466	13.466	54.331
6	Gaelle Mys (BEL)	13.766	13.233	13.500	13.300	53.799
7	Dorina Böczögő (HUN)	13.766	13.100	13.266	13.333	53.465
8	Valentine Pikul (FRA)	14.033	13.433	13.300	12.233	52.999
9	Laura Jurca (ROU)	13.400	12.200	13.666	13.366	52.632
10	Ainhoa Carmona (ESP)	14.000	12.633	13.100	12.233	51.966
11	Kelly Simm (GBR)	14.133	14.266	10.233	13.300	51.932
12	Gabriela Janik (POL)	13.833	13.233	12.566	11.900	51.532
13	Tutya Yılmaz (TUR)	13.766	11.966	12.333	12.766	50.831
14	Angelina Kysla (UKR)	13.666	12.666	12.633	11.666	50.631
15	Marina Nekrasova (AZE)	13.966	10.233	13.166	12.733	50.098
16	Vasiliki Millousi (GRE)	13.300	11.766	12.933	11.600	49.599
17	Tzuf Feldon (ISR)	12.800	11.966	12.933	11.900	49.599
18	Barbora Mokošová (SVK)	13.833	12.166	10.633	12.200	48.832
