= Teal Grindle =

British artistic gymnast

- Born: 15 February 2000 (age 26) Tring England, United Kingdom

Gymnastics career
- Discipline: Women's artistic gymnastics
- Country represented: United Kingdom
- Club: Sapphire School of Gymnastics
- Head coach: Steven Price
Medal record
Representing United Kingdom
European Junior Championships
Silver medal – second place	2014 Sofia	Team
Australian Youth Olympic Festival
Gold medal – first place	2013 Sydney	Balance Beam
Silver medal – second place	2013 Sydney	Team
Silver medal – second place	2013 Sydney	All-Around

Teal Grindle (born 15 February 2000) is a British artistic gymnast. She was part of the silver medal winning junior team at the 2014 European Junior Championships in Sofia, Bulgaria.

== Junior career ==
=== 2013 ===
In January, Grindle competed at the Australian Youth Olympic Festival in Sydney. She was part of the silver medal winning team, she contributed scores on three apparatuses, on the vault Grindle scored 13.600, 12.266 on the uneven bars and 13.933 on the balance beam. She also won the all-around silver medal behind teammate Tyesha Mattis with a final score of 54.065 and became the balance beam champion with a score of 14.500.

In March, Grindle competed at the British Espoir Championships. She won the silver medal on uneven bars with a score of 12.850, the gold on the balance beam with 13.900 and shared first place with Catherine Lyons on the floor exercise with 13.900.

=== 2014 ===
In March Grindle competed at the British Championships, her first year as a junior. She won the silver medal in the all-around competition behind Amy Tinkler. She scored 13.900 on the vault, 13.35 on the uneven bars, 13.800 on the balance beam and 13.350 on the floor exercise for a total on 54.400. She was fourth in the vault final scoring 13.700 for her first vault and 13.250 for her second for an averaged total of 13.475. Grindle won the bronze medal on the uneven bars with a score of 13.550 a gold medal on the balance beam with a score of 14.400 and a second bronze on the floor exercise with a score of 13.450.
