= 2014 European Women's Artistic Gymnastics Championships =

30th European Women's Artistic Gymnastics Championships
- Venue: Arena Armeec
- Location: Sofia, Bulgaria
- Dates: 12 to 18 May 2014
- Nations: Members of the European Union of Gymnastics

The 30th European Women's Artistic Gymnastics Championships was held from 12 to 18 May 2014 at the Arena Armeec in Sofia, Bulgaria. They were held in conjunction with the 2014 European Men's Artistic Gymnastics Championships, which began 19 May in the same arena. It was the fourth time the senior and junior women's and men's European championships had been held in one location, which posed logistical difficulties for the organizers; there were also issues with installing the podiums and apparatuses.

288 gymnasts from 37 nations competed. The event functioned as a qualification for the 2014 Summer Youth Olympics and for the 2015 European Games. For the team event, teams consisted of up to five gymnasts, of whom four could compete on any apparatus, with the top three scores counting. A team could count fewer scores if necessary; for example, the senior Bulgarian team finished last after one gymnast, Valentina Rashkova, broke her leg performing her vault and they only had two gymnasts perform on the uneven bars.

The junior team from Great Britain won the first British junior team medal, a silver, behind Russia. Angelina Melnikova won the junior all-around as well as the balance beam final and silver on the uneven bars.

In the senior event, Romania won their second consecutive team title. In the apparatus finals, Giulia Steingruber won her second consecutive vault gold, while Anna Pavlova won the first European medal (silver) by a gymnast representing Azerbaijan. On the floor exercise, Vanessa Ferrari and Larisa Iordache tied for gold. On the uneven bars, Becky Downie won her first European title, while Maria Kharenkova, in her first year of senior eligibility, won the balance beam final. Iordache won the most medals overall, with her Romanian team medal and three event final medals, followed by Aliya Mustafina, with her Russian team medal and two individual event final medals, and Steingruber, who won bronze on the floor exercise in addition to her vault title.

== Schedule ==
The competition schedule is as follows (all times are local, EEST, UTC+03:00).

Wednesday, 14 May 2014

- 10:00 – 19:30 Junior team final and individual qualifying competition

Thursday, 15 May 2014

- 10:00 – 19:30 Senior qualifying competition

Friday, 16 May 2014

- 15:00 – 17:00 Junior all-around final

Saturday, 17 May 2014

- 15:00 – 16:40 Senior team final

Sunday, 18 May 2014

- 09:30 – 11:50 Junior individual event finals
- 14:00 – 16:20 Senior individual event finals

== Medalists ==
Event	Gold	Silver	Bronze
Seniors
Team	Romania; Larisa Iordache; Diana Bulimar; Andreea Munteanu; Ștefania Stănilă; Silvia Zarzu	United Kingdom; Rebecca Downie; Ruby Harrold; Claudia Fragapane; Rebecca Tunney; Hannah Whelan	Russia; Maria Kharenkova; Aliya Mustafina; Daria Spiridonova; Alla Sosnitskaya; Anna Rodionova
Vault	(Switzerland) Giulia Steingruber	(Azerbaijan) Anna Pavlova	(Romania) Larisa Iordache
Uneven bars	(United Kingdom) Rebecca Downie	(Russia) Aliya Mustafina	(Russia) Daria Spiridonova
Balance beam	(Russia) Maria Kharenkova	(Romania) Larisa Iordache	(Russia) Aliya Mustafina
Floor	(Italy) Vanessa Ferrari (Romania) Larisa Iordache	none awarded	(Switzerland) Giulia Steingruber
Juniors
Team	Russia; Angelina Melnikova; Seda Tutkhalyan; Maria Bondareva; Anastasia Dmitrieva; Daria Skrypnik	United Kingdom; Ellie Downie; Catherine Lyons; Rhyannon Jones; Amy Tinkler; Teal Grindle	Romania; Laura Jurcă; Andreea Iridon; Anda Butuc; Andra Stoica; Andreea Ciurusniuc
Individual all-around	(Russia) Angelina Melnikova	(Romania) Laura Jurcă	(United Kingdom) Ellie Downie
Vault	(United Kingdom) Ellie Downie	(Romania) Laura Jurcă	(United Kingdom) Amy Tinkler
Uneven bars	(Russia) Daria Skrypnik	(Russia) Angelina Melnikova	(Germany) Maike Enderle
Balance beam	(Russia) Angelina Melnikova	(Romania) Andreea Iridon	(Germany) Tabea Alt
Floor	(United Kingdom) Catherine Lyons	(United Kingdom) Amy Tinkler (Romania) Andreea Iridon	none awarded

== Senior Results ==
The Great Britain team lead during the qualification round. In the final, the British team performed very well on the uneven bars but counted a fall on the floor event and several balance issues on the balance beam and came in second behind the Romanian team, which won their second consecutive European title.

=== Team competition ===
Senior	Name	Country	Date of birth	Age
Youngest	Silvia Zarzu	Romania	16/12/98	15 years
Oldest	Kim Bùi	Germany	20/01/89	25 years

Rank	Team	Vault (gymnastics)	Uneven bars	Balance beam	Floor (gymnastics)	Total
1st place, gold medalist(s)	Romania	44.165 (1)	41.599 (4)	44.166 (1)	42.824 (1)	172.754
1st place, gold medalist(s)	Larisa Iordache	14.866	13.966	14.700	14.466	172.754
1st place, gold medalist(s)	Diana Bulimar		14.133	14.533	14.225	172.754
1st place, gold medalist(s)	Andreea Munteanu			14.933	14.133	172.754
1st place, gold medalist(s)	Ștefania Stănilă	14.666	13.500			172.754
1st place, gold medalist(s)	Silvia Zarzu	14.633				172.754
2nd place, silver medalist(s)	Great Britain	43.733 (2)	44.332 (1)	41.333 (3)	41.265 (3)	170.663
2nd place, silver medalist(s)	Rebecca Downie	14.700	14.833	14.133		170.663
2nd place, silver medalist(s)	Ruby Harrold		14.733	13.300	12.866	170.663
2nd place, silver medalist(s)	Rebecca Tunney	14.533	14.766			170.663
2nd place, silver medalist(s)	Claudia Fragapane	14.500			14.766	170.663
2nd place, silver medalist(s)	Hannah Whelan			13.900	13.633	170.663
3rd place, bronze medalist(s)	Russia	43.366 (3)	43.665 (3)	41.666 (2)	40.632 (4)	169.329
3rd place, bronze medalist(s)	Aliya Mustafina	14.700	15.166	14.800		169.329
3rd place, bronze medalist(s)	Maria Kharenkova	13.933		14.566	13.766	169.329
3rd place, bronze medalist(s)	Daria Spiridonova		15.066	12.300	13.100	169.329
3rd place, bronze medalist(s)	Alla Sosnitskaya	14.733			13.766	169.329
3rd place, bronze medalist(s)	Anna Rodionova		13.433			169.329
4	Germany	42.899 (4)	43.899 (2)	41.099 (4)	38.899 (8)	166.796
4	Kim Bùi	14.033	14.766		13.300	166.796
4	Pauline Schäfer	13.900		14.033	12.233	166.796
4	Çağla Akyol			13.533	13.366	166.796
4	Janine Berger	14.966	14.133			166.796
4	Sophie Scheder		15.000	13.533		166.796
5	Italy	42.899 (4)	36.599 (8)	39.666 (5)	42.324 (2)	161.488
5	Elisa Meneghini	14.066	12.366	13.933	14.000	161.488
5	Giorgia Campana		13.833	12.500		161.488
5	Erika Fasana	14.433			13.833	161.488
5	Vanessa Ferrari			13.233	14.491	161.488
5	Martina Rizzelli	14.400	10.400			161.488
6	Spain	41.965 (7)	41.166 (6)	37.633 (8)	40.157 (5)	160.921
6	Claudia Colom	13.666	13.400	12.000	12.891	160.921
6	Roxana Popa	14.466	14.166	12.600	14.200	160.921
6	Cintia Rodríguez		13.600	13.033	13.066	160.921
6	Ana Perez	13.833				160.921
6	Laura Gamell					160.921
7	Belgium	41.366 (8)	41.365 (5)	38.365 (6)	39.632 (6)	160.728
7	Gaelle Mys	13.800	13.233	12.766	13.100	160.728
7	Lisa Verschueren	13.800	13.866	12.533	13.166	160.728
7	Laura Waem	13.766	14.266	13.066	13.366	160.728
7	Dorien Motten					160.728
7	Lin Versonnen					160.728
8	Switzerland	42.299 (6)	40.833 (7)	37.999 (7)	39.266 (7)	160.397
8	Giulia Steingruber	15.100	14.133	12.833	13.000	160.397
8	Ilaria Käslin		13.200	14.100	13.100	160.397
8	Nadia Mülhauser	13.533	13.500			160.397
8	Laura Schulte	13.666			13.166	160.397
8	Stefanie Siegenthaler			11.066		160.397

=== Vault ===
Senior	Name	Country	Date of birth	Age
Youngest	Noémi Makra	Hungary	18/11/97	16 years
Oldest	Anna Pavlova	Azerbaijan	06/09/87	26 years

Rank	Gymnast	D Score	E Score	Pen.	Score 1	D Score	E Score	Pen.	Score 2	Total
1st place, gold medalist(s)	Giulia Steingruber (SUI)	6.200	9.000		15.200	5.000	9.133		14.133	14.666
2nd place, silver medalist(s)	Anna Pavlova (AZE)	5.800	8.966		14.766	5.600	8.800		14.400	14.583
3rd place, bronze medalist(s)	Larisa Iordache (ROU)	5.800	9.066		14.866	5.200	9.000		14.200	14.533
4	Alla Sosnitskaya (RUS)	5.800	8.966		14.766	5.600	8.833	-0.3	14.133	14.449
5	Janine Berger (GER)	6.200	8.666	-0.1	14.766	5.200	8.833		13.966	14.366
6	Claudia Fragapane (GBR)	5.800	8.633		14.433	5.600	8.633		14.233	14.333
7	Kim Bùi (GER)	5.400	8.666		14.066	5.000	8.766		13.766	13.899
8	Noémi Makra (HUN)	5.000	8.958		13.958	4.000	8.766		12.766	13.362
Rank	Gymnast	Vault 1				Vault 2				Total

=== Uneven Bars ===
Senior	Name	Country	Date of birth	Age
Youngest	Daria Spiridonova	Russia	08/07/98	15 years
Oldest	Kim Bùi	Germany	20/01/89	25 years

Position	Gymnast	D Score	E Score	Penalty	Total
1st place, gold medalist(s)	Rebecca Downie (GBR)	6.600	8.900		15.500
2nd place, silver medalist(s)	Aliya Mustafina (RUS)	6.300	8.966		15.266
3rd place, bronze medalist(s)	Daria Spiridonova (RUS)	6.400	8.566		14.966
4	Rebecca Tunney (GBR)	6.600	8.333		14.933
5	Sophie Scheder (GER)	6.400	8.333		14.733
6	Larisa Iordache (ROU)	6.000	8.533		14.533
7	Kim Bùi (GER)	6.000	8.400		14.400
8	Roxana Popa (ESP)	6.200	8.066		14.266

=== Balance Beam ===
Senior	Name	Country	Date of birth	Age
Youngest	Maria Kharenkova	Russia	29/10/98	15 years
Oldest	Marta Pihan-Kulesza	Poland	23/07/87	26 years

Position	Gymnast	D Score	E Score	Penalty	Total
1st place, gold medalist(s)	Maria Kharenkova (RUS)	6.400	8.533		14.933
2nd place, silver medalist(s)	Larisa Iordache (ROU)	6.400	8.400		14.800
3rd place, bronze medalist(s)	Aliya Mustafina (RUS)	6.000	8.733		14.733
4	Rebecca Downie (GBR)	5.900	8.466		14.366
5	Vanessa Ferrari (ITA)	5.700	8.433		14.133
6	Marta Pihan-Kulesza (POL)	5.900	7.833		13.733
7	Claire Martin (FRA)	5.800	7.566		13.366
8	Giulia Steingruber (SUI)	5.900	7.300		13.200

=== Floor ===
Senior	Name	Country	Date of birth	Age
Youngest	Claudia Fragapane	United Kingdom	24/10/97	16 years
Oldest	Marta Pihan-Kulesza	Poland	23/07/87	26 years

Position	Gymnast	D Score	E Score	Penalty	Total
1st place, gold medalist(s)	Larisa Iordache (ROU)	6.100	8.700		14.800
1st place, gold medalist(s)	Vanessa Ferrari (ITA)	6.300	8.500		14.800
3rd place, bronze medalist(s)	Giulia Steingruber (SUI)	6.100	8.400		14.500
4	Diana Bulimar (ROU)	5.800	8.600		14.400
4	Marta Pihan-Kulesza (POL)	6.000	8.400		14.400
6	Alla Sosnitskaya (RUS)	5.700	8.566		14.266
7	Roxana Popa (ESP)	5.800	8.391		14.191
8	Claudia Fragapane (GBR)	6.000	8.133		14.133

== Junior Results ==
=== Team competition ===
The junior team competition served as qualification to the all-around and individual event finals. The results of the top 8 teams are below. The other competing teams were Austria, Azerbaijan, Belarus, Bulgaria, Croatia, Czech Republic, Cyprus, Denmark, Finland, Georgia, Greece, Hungary, Iceland, Ireland, Israel, Latvia, Lithuania, Luxembourg, the Netherlands, Norway, Poland, Portugal, Slovakia, Slovenia, Spain, Sweden, Ukraine and Turkey.

Oldest and youngest competitors

	Name	Country	Date of birth	Age
Youngest	Carina Kröll	Germany	29 December 2000	13 years, 4 months and 15 days
Oldest	Anastasia Dmitrieva	Russia	21 January 1999	15 years, 3 months and 23 days

Rank	Team	Vault (gymnastics)	Uneven bars	Balance beam	Floor (gymnastics)	Total
1st place, gold medalist(s)	Russia	42.966 (2)	43.032 (1)	41.332 (2)	40.932 (3)	168.262
1st place, gold medalist(s)	Angelina Melnikova	14.200	14.633	14.400	13.466	168.262
1st place, gold medalist(s)	Seda Tutkhalyan	14.700	14.166	13.566	13.900	168.262
1st place, gold medalist(s)	Maria Bondareva	14.033	13.966	12.800	13.400	168.262
1st place, gold medalist(s)	Anastasia Dmitrieva	14.066			13.566	168.262
1st place, gold medalist(s)	Daria Skrypnik		14.233	13.366		168.262
2nd place, silver medalist(s)	Great Britain	43.532 (1)	40.199 (3)	40.108 (3)	41.166 (1)	165.005
2nd place, silver medalist(s)	Ellie Downie	14.800	13.600	12.908	13.633	165.005
2nd place, silver medalist(s)	Catherine Lyons	14.066	13.366	13.700	13.800	165.005
2nd place, silver medalist(s)	Rhyannon Jones	13.533	13.233	12.433	13.600	165.005
2nd place, silver medalist(s)	Amy Tinkler	14.666			13.733	165.005
2nd place, silver medalist(s)	Teal Grindle		12.533	13.500		165.005
3rd place, bronze medalist(s)	Romania	42.233 (3)	40.066 (4)	41.574 (1)	41.099 (2)	164.972
3rd place, bronze medalist(s)	Laura Jurcă	14.633	13.500	13.575	13.933	164.972
3rd place, bronze medalist(s)	Andreea Iridon	12.666	13.400	13.933	13.966	164.972
3rd place, bronze medalist(s)	Anda Butuc		12.900	14.066	13.200	164.972
3rd place, bronze medalist(s)	Andra Stoica	13.900		12.933	12.700	164.972
3rd place, bronze medalist(s)	Andreea Ciurusniuc	13.700	13.166			164.972
4	Germany	41.533 (6)	41.166 (2)	38.032 (5)	39.566 (8)	161.297
4	Tabea Alt	13.900	14.166	13.500	13.300	161.297
4	Maike Enderle	13.900	14.200	12.266	12.333	161.297
4	Pauline Tratz	13.733	12.466	11.333	13.300	161.297
4	Rebecca Matzon	13.000	13.800			161.297
4	Carina Kröll			12.266	12.966	161.297
5	Italy	41.932 (5)	39.732 (6)	37.873 (6)	40.499 (4)	160.036
5	Sofia Busato	13.966	13.233	12.641	13.366	160.036
5	Pilar Rubagotti	13.633	13.266	12.666	13.533	160.036
5	Iosra Abdelaziz	13.933	12.300	12.466	13.233	160.036
5	Chiara Imeraj		13.233	12.566	13.600	160.036
5	Desirée Carofiglio	14.033				160.036
6	Belgium	40.699 (8)	39.666 (7)	39.365 (4)	40.299 (5)	160.029
6	Axelle Klinckaert	13.666	13.166	13.266	13.633	160.029
6	Rune Hermans	13.600	13.100	13.033	13.233	160.029
6	Nina Derwael	13.000	13.400	13.066	13.433	160.029
6	Jelle Beullens	13.433		12.066	12.833	160.029
6	Cindy Vandenhole		12.400			160.029
7	France	41.499 (7)	39.499 (8)	37.824 (7)	40.066 (6)	158.888
7	Loan His	14.033	14.033	13.033	13.400	158.888
7	Marine Boyer	13.433	12.566	11.866	13.333	158.888
7	Camille Bahl	13.433	11.100	12.925	13.333	158.888
7	Océane Pause	14.033	12.900	11.433		158.888
7	Juliette Bossu				12.800	158.888
8	Switzerland	40.432 (9)	39.740 (5)	36.166 (8)	39.165 (9)	155.503
8	Giada Grisetti	13.500	13.508	11.833	13.133	155.503
8	Anja Schwarz	12.866	13.666	12.133	12.666	155.503
8	Thea Brogli	13.166	12.566	12.200	12.966	155.503
8	Gaia Nesurini	13.766	12.000	11.433	13.066	155.503
8	Rebekka Schuster					155.503

=== Individual All-Around ===
Oldest and youngest competitors

	Name	Country	Date of birth	Age
Youngest	Maike Enderle	Germany	15 September 2000	13 years, 8 months and 1 day
Oldest	Veronika Cenková	Czech Republic	11 February 1999	15 years, 3 months and 5 days

Rank	Gymnast	Vault (gymnastics)	Uneven bars	Balance beam	Floor (gymnastics)	Total
1st place, gold medalist(s)	Angelina Melnikova (RUS)	14.500	14.566	14.175	13.866	57.107
2nd place, silver medalist(s)	Laura Jurcă (ROU)	14.733	12.933	14.066	13.966	55.698
3rd place, bronze medalist(s)	Ellie Downie (GBR)	14.800	13.366	13.333	13.833	55.332
4	Catherine Lyons (GBR)	13.766	13.266	14.166	14.033	55.231
5	Maike Enderle (GER)	13.933	14.333	13.066	13.166	54.498
6	Andreea Iridon (ROU)	13.400	13.400	13.200	13.933	53.933
7	Seda Tutkhalyan (RUS)	14.333	12.900	12.833	13.866	53.932
8	Loan His (FRA)	13.966	13.033	13.133	13.766	53.898
9	Rune Hermans (BEL)	13.333	13.266	13.433	13.733	53.765
10	Giada Grisetti (SUI)	13.533	13.400	13.050	13.400	53.383
11	Anja Schwarz (SUI)	13.366	13.400	12.966	13.066	52.798
12	Yana Horokhova (UKR)	13.433	12.833	13.400	12.800	52.466
13	Marine Boyer (FRA)	13.633	12.900	12.533	13.233	52.299
14	Tabea Alt (GER)	13.733	14.300	11.733	12.133	51.899
15	Pilar Rubagotti (ITA)	13.433	12.366	12.800	13.200	51.799
16	Wendy de Jong (NED)	13.533	13.133	12.166	12.900	51.732
17	Sofia Busato (ITA)	12.833	12.766	12.066	13.266	50.931
18	Emmy Haavisto (SWE)	13.066	13.266	11.733	12.600	50.665
19	Zsófia Kovács (HUN)	12.775	12.366	12.833	12.566	50.540
20	Ellen Haavisto (SWE)	13.000	12.400	11.933	13.033	50.366
21	Veronika Cenková (CZE)	12.866	11.700	12.533	12.866	49.965
22	Casey Bell (IRL)	13.341	11.966	12.266	12.333	49.906
23	Boglárka Dévai (HUN)	13.700	11.866	12.000	12.333	49.899
24	Axelle Klinckaert (BEL)	9.833	12.400	13.766	13.633	49.632

=== Vault ===
Oldest and youngest competitors

	Name	Country	Date of birth	Age
Youngest	Sofia Busato	Italy	4 September 2000	13 years, 8 months and 14 days
Oldest	Isa Maassen	Netherlands	4 March 1999	15 years, 2 months and 14 days

Rank	Gymnast	D Score	E Score	Pen.	Score 1	D Score	E Score	Pen.	Score 2	Total
1st place, gold medalist(s)	Ellie Downie (GBR)	5.800	9.133		14.933	5.200	9.133		14.333	14.633
2nd place, silver medalist(s)	Laura Jurcă (ROU)	5.800	8.966		14.766	5.000	9.000		14.000	14.383
3rd place, bronze medalist(s)	Amy Tinkler (GBR)	5.800	8.933		14.733	5.000	8.966		13.966	14.349
4	Seda Tutkhalyan (RUS)	5.800	8.666	-0.1	14.366	5.200	8.966		14.166	14.266
5	Sofia Busato (ITA)	5.300	9.066		14.366	5.000	9.133		14.133	14.249
6	Angelina Melnikova (RUS)	5.000	9.000	-0.1	13.900	5.800	8.800	-0.1	14.500	14.200
7	Desirée Carofiglio (ITA)	5.300	8.966		14.266	5.000	8.941		13.941	14.103
8	Isa Maassen (NED)	5.800	7.700	-0.3	12.700	4.400	8.766		13.166	12.933
Rank	Gymnast	Vault 1				Vault 2				Total

=== Uneven Bars ===
Oldest and youngest competitors

	Name	Country	Date of birth	Age
Youngest	Daria Skrypnik	Russia	4 October 2000	13 years, 7 months and 14 days
Oldest	Loan His	France	10 April 1999	15 years, 1 month and 8 days

Position	Gymnast	D Score	E Score	Penalty	Total
1st place, gold medalist(s)	Daria Skrypnik (RUS)	6.300	8.533		14.833
2nd place, silver medalist(s)	Angelina Melnikova (RUS)	6.100	8.666		14.633
3rd place, bronze medalist(s)	Maike Enderle (GER)	6.100	8.400		14.500
4	Tabea Alt (GER)	5.900	8.166		14.066
5	Ellie Downie (GBR)	5.300	8.500		13.800
6	Anja Schwarz (SUI)	5.200	8.533		13.733
7	Giada Grisetti (SUI)	5.300	8.133		13.433
8	Loan His (FRA)	5.500	7.866		13.366

=== Balance Beam ===
Oldest and youngest competitors

	Name	Country	Date of birth	Age
Youngest	Catherine Lyons	Great Britain	30 August 2000	13 years, 8 months and 18 days
Oldest	Seda Tutkhalyan	Russia	15 July 1999	14 years, 10 months and 3 days

Position	Gymnast	D Score	E Score	Penalty	Total
1st place, gold medalist(s)	Angelina Melnikova (RUS)	6.100	8.475		14.575
2nd place, silver medalist(s)	Andreea Iridon (ROU)	5.800	8.633		14.433
3rd place, bronze medalist(s)	Tabea Alt (GER)	5.700	8.500		14.200
4	Teal Grindle (GBR)	5.600	8.133		13.733
5	Catherine Lyons (GBR)	5.300	8.366		13.666
6	Anda Butuc (ROU)	5.600	7.733		13.333
7	Seda Tutkhalyan (RUS)	5.200	7.900		13.100
8	Axelle Klinckaert (BEL)	5.100	7.833		12.933

=== Floor ===
Oldest and youngest competitors

	Name	Country	Date of birth	Age
Youngest	Catherine Lyons	Great Britain	30 August 2000	13 years, 8 months and 18 days
Oldest	Anastasia Dmitrieva	Russia	21 January 1999	15 years, 3 months and 27 days

Position	Gymnast	D Score	E Score	Penalty	Total
1st place, gold medalist(s)	Catherine Lyons (GBR)	5.200	8.833		14.033
2nd place, silver medalist(s)	Amy Tinkler (GBR)	5.400	8.566		13.966
2nd place, silver medalist(s)	Andreea Iridon (ROU)	5.300	8.666		13.966
4	Chiara Imeraj (ITA)	5.200	8.500		13.700
5	Laura Jurcă (ROU)	5.500	8.233	-0.1	13.633
6	Anastasia Dmitrieva (RUS)	5.200	8.300		13.500
7	Axelle Klinckaert (BEL)	5.200	8.166		13.366
8	Seda Tutkhalyan (RUS)	5.200	8.133	-0.3	13.033

== Qualification ==
=== Seniors ===
==== Team competition ====
Rank	Team	Vault (gymnastics)	Uneven bars	Balance beam	Floor (gymnastics)	Total
1	Great Britain	43.825 (2)	44.732 (2)	41.324 (3)	42.266 (2)	172.147
1	Becky Downie	14.600	15.100	14.200		172.147
1	Ruby Harrold		14.666	13.033	13.800	172.147
1	Claudia Fragapane	14.625			14.766	172.147
1	Rebecca Tunney	14.600	14.966			172.147
1	Hannah Whelan			14.091	13.700	172.147
2	Romania	44.066 (1)	41.266 (6)	43.232 (2)	42.566 (1)	171.130
2	Larisa Iordache	14.800	14.533	15.166	15.000	171.130
2	Diana Bulimar		14.100	14.033	14.366	171.130
2	Andreea Munteanu			14.033	13.200	171.130
2	Ștefania Stănilă	14.700	12.633			171.130
2	Silvia Zarzu	14.566				171.130
3	Russia	42.532 (6)	44.866 (1)	43.357 (1)	39.866 (11)	170.621
3	Maria Kharenkova	14.033		15.066	13.833	170.621
3	Daria Spiridonova		14.900	14.058	11.900	170.621
3	Aliya Mustafina		15.100	14.233		170.621
3	Anna Rodionova	13.933	14.866			170.621
3	Alla Sosnitskaya	14.566			14.133	170.621
4	Italy	42.632 (5)	41.365 (5)	41.032 (4)	41.899 (3)	166.928
4	Elisa Meneghini	14.033	13.733	13.566	13.966	166.928
4	Giorgia Campana		13.866	13.300		166.928
4	Erika Fasana	14.266			13.400	166.928
4	Vanessa Ferrari			14.166	14.533	166.928
4	Martina Rizzelli	14.333	13.766			166.928
5	Germany	42.898 (3)	42.999 (3)	40.632 (5)	40.166 (8)	166.695
5	Kim Bùi	13.966	14.500		13.200	166.695
5	Pauline Schäfer	14.066		13.833	13.600	166.695
5	Çağla Akyol			13.833	13.366	166.695
5	Janine Berger	14.866	13.633			166.695
5	Sophie Scheder		14.866	12.966		166.695
6	Switzerland	42.733 (4)	39.966 (9)	39.732 (8)	41.232 (4)	163.663
6	Ilaria Käslin	13.700	13.133	13.966	13.533	163.663
6	Giulia Steingruber	15.133	13.933	14.133	14.566	163.663
6	Laura Schulte	13.900			13.133	163.663
6	Nadia Mülhauser		12.900			163.663
6	Stefanie Siegenthaler			11.633		163.663
7	Belgium	41.399 (12)	40.966 (7)	39.766 (7)	40.499 (6)	162.630
7	Gaelle Mys	13.800	13.200	13.233	13.500	162.630
7	Lisa Verschueren	13.766	13.633	13.233	13.633	162.630
7	Laura Waem	13.833	14.133	13.300	13.366	162.630
7	Dorien Motten					162.630
7	Lin Versonnen					162.630
8	Spain	42.266 (7)	41.932 (4)	38.141 (12)	39.932 (10)	162.271
8	Claudia Colom	13.700	13.766	12.600	12.766	162.271
8	Roxana Popa	14.766	14.433	12.741	14.000	162.271
8	Cintia Rodríguez		13.733	12.800	13.166	162.271
8	Ana Pérez	13.800				162.271
8	Laura Gamell					162.271

==== Vault ====
Rank	Gymnast	D Score	E Score	Pen.	Score 1	D Score	E Score	Pen.	Score 2	Total
1	Giulia Steingruber (SUI)	6.200	8.933		15.133	5.000	9.216		14.216	14.674
2	Anna Pavlova (AZE)	5.800	8.966		14.766	5.600	8.666		14.266	14.516
3	Claudia Fragapane (GBR)	5.800	8.825		14.625	5.600	8.700		14.300	14.462
4	Larisa Iordache (ROU)	5.800	9.000		14.800	5.200	8.900		14.100	14.450
5	Janine Berger (GER)	6.200	8.666		14.866	5.200	8.766		13.966	14.416
6	Alla Sosnitskaya (RUS)	5.800	8.866	-0.1	14.566	5.600	8.800	-0.3	14.100	14.333
7	Noémi Makra (HUN)	5.000	8.933		13.933	5.000	9.033		14.033	13.983
8	Kim Bùi (GER)	5.400	8.566		13.966	5.000	8.833		13.833	13.899
Rank	Gymnast	Vault 1				Vault 2				Total

==== Uneven Bars ====
Position	Gymnast	D Score	E Score	Penalty	Total
1	Becky Downie (GBR)	6.200	8.900		15.100
1	Aliya Mustafina (RUS)	6.300	8.800		15.100
3	Rebecca Tunney (GBR)	6.600	8.366		14.966
4	Daria Spiridonova (RUS)	6.300	8.600		14.900
5	Sophie Scheder (GER)	6.400	8.466		14.866
6	Larisa Iordache (ROU)	6.000	8.533		14.533
7	Kim Bùi (GER)	6.000	8.500		14.500
8	Roxana Popa (ESP)	6.200	8.233		14.433

==== Balance Beam ====
Position	Gymnast	D Score	E Score	Penalty	Total
1	Larisa Iordache (ROU)	6.400	8.766		15.166
2	Maria Kharenkova (RUS)	6.400	8.666		15.066
3	Marta Pihan-Kulesza (POL)	5.900	8.500		14.400
4	Aliya Mustafina (RUS)	5.800	8.433		14.233
5	Rebecca Downie (GBR)	5.900	8.300		14.200
6	Vanessa Ferrari (ITA)	5.800	8.366		14.166
7	Claire Martin (FRA)	5.800	8.333		14.133
8	Giulia Steingruber (SUI)	5.900	8.233		14.133

==== Floor ====
Position	Gymnast	D Score	E Score	Penalty	Total
1	Larisa Iordache (ROU)	6.300	8.700		15.000
2	Claudia Fragapane (GBR)	6.000	8.766		14.766
3	Giulia Steingruber (SUI)	6.100	8.466		14.566
4	Vanessa Ferrari (ITA)	6.000	8.533		14.533
5	Diana Bulimar (ROU)	5.700	8.666		14.366
6	Marta Pihan-Kulesza (POL)	6.000	8.300		14.300
7	Alla Sosnitskaya (RUS)	5.700	8.433		14.133
8	Roxana Popa (ESP)	5.900	8.100		14.000

=== Juniors ===
==== Individual All-Around ====
Rank	Gymnast	Vault (gymnastics)	Uneven bars	Balance beam	Floor (gymnastics)	Total
1	Angelina Melnikova (RUS)	14.200	14.633	14.400	13.466	56.699
2	Seda Tutkhalyan (RUS)	14.700	14.166	13.566	13.900	56.332
3	Laura Jurcă (ROU)	14.633	13.500	13.575	13.933	55.641
4	Ellie Downie (GBR)	14.800	13.600	12.908	13.633	54.941
5	Catherine Lyons (GBR)	14.066	13.366	13.700	13.000	54.932
6	Tabea Alt (GER)	13.900	14.166	13.500	13.300	54.866
7	Loan His (FRA)	14.033	14.033	13.033	13.400	54.199
8	Andreea Iridon (ROU)	12.666	13.400	13.933	13.966	53.965
9	Axelle Klinckaert (BEL)	13.666	13.166	13.266	13.633	53.731
10	Sofia Busato (ITA)	13.966	13.233	12.641	13.366	53.206
11	Pilar Rubagotti (ITA)	13.633	13.266	12.666	13.533	53.098
12	Rune Hermans (BEL)	13.600	13.100	13.033	13.233	52.966
13	Maike Enderle (GER)	13.900	14.200	12.266	12.333	52.699
14	Giada Grisetti (SUI)	13.500	13.508	11.833	13.133	51.974
15	Anja Schwarz (SUI)	12.866	13.666	12.133	12.666	51.331
16	Wendy de Jong (NED)	13.566	12.900	12.000	12.833	51.299
17	Marine Boyer (FRA)	13.433	12.566	11.866	13.333	51.198
18	Zsófia Kovács (HUN)	12.233	13.333	12.700	12.900	51.166
19	Ellen Haavisto (SWE)	12.966	13.100	11.866	13.033	50.965
20	Boglárka Dévai (HUN)	13.800	12.166	11.633	12.666	50.265
21	Emmy Haavisto (SWE)	13.066	12.866	11.566	12.500	49.998
21	Veronika Cenková (CZE)	13.000	11.766	12.566	12.666	49.998
23	Yana Horokhova (UKR)	13.533	12.200	11.033	13.200	49.966
24	Casey Bell (IRL)	13.333	12.366	11.566	12.300	49.565

==== Vault ====
Rank	Gymnast	D Score	E Score	Pen.	Score 1	D Score	E Score	Pen.	Score 2	Total
1	Ellie Downie (GBR)	5.800	9.000		14.800	5.200	9.033		14.233	14.516
2	Seda Tutkhalyan (RUS)	5.800	8.900		14.700	5.200	8.966		14.166	14.433
3	Laura Jurcă (ROU)	5.800	8.833		14.633	5.000	9.033		14.033	14.333
4	Amy Tinkler (GBR)	5.800	8.866		14.666	5.000	8.900		13.900	14.283
5	Angelina Melnikova (RUS)	5.800	8.700	-0.3	14.200	5.000	9.066		14.066	14.133
6	Sofia Busato (ITA)	5.300	8.666		13.966	5.000	9.066		14.066	14.016
7	Desirée Carofiglio (ITA)	5.300	8.733		14.033	5.000	8.733		13.733	13.883
8	Isa Maassen (NED)	5.800	8.933		14.733	4.400	8.900	-0.3	13.000	13.866
Rank	Gymnast	Vault 1				Vault 2				Total

==== Uneven Bars ====
Position	Gymnast	D Score	E Score	Penalty	Total
1	Angelina Melnikova (RUS)	6.100	8.533		14.633
2	Daria Skrypnik (RUS)	6.200	8.033		14.233
3	Maike Enderle (GER)	6.100	8.100		14.200
4	Tabea Alt (GER)	6.100	8.066		14.166
5	Loan His (FRA)	5.800	8.233		14.033
6	Anja Schwarz (SUI)	5.200	8.466		13.666
7	Ellie Downie (GBR)	5.200	8.400		13.600
8	Giada Grisetti (SUI)	5.300	8.208		13.508

==== Balance Beam ====
Position	Gymnast	D Score	E Score	Penalty	Total
1	Angelina Melnikova (RUS)	6.100	8.300		14.400
2	Anda Butuc (ROU)	5.800	8.266		14.066
3	Andreea Iridon (ROU)	5.700	8.233		13.933
4	Catherine Lyons (GBR)	5.500	8.200		13.700
5	Seda Tutkhalyan (RUS)	6.000	7.566		13.566
6	Teal Grindle (GBR)	5.700	7.800		13.500
6	Tabea Alt (GER)	5.700	7.800		13.500
8	Axelle Klinckaert (BEL)	5.500	7.766		13.266

==== Floor ====
Position	Gymnast	D Score	E Score	Penalty	Total
1	Andreea Iridon (ROU)	5.300	8.666		13.966
2	Laura Jurcă (ROU)	5.500	8.433		13.933
3	Seda Tutkhalyan (RUS)	5.300	8.600		13.900
4	Catherine Lyons (GBR)	5.200	8.700	-0.1	13.800
5	Amy Tinkler (GBR)	5.400	8.333		13.733
6	Axelle Klinckaert (BEL)	5.200	8.433		13.633
7	Chiara Imeraj (ITA)	5.100	8.500		13.600
8	Anastasia Dmitrieva (RUS)	5.200	8.366		13.566

== Medal Count ==
=== Combined ===
Rank	Nation	Gold	Silver	Bronze	Total
1	Russia	5	2	3	10
2	Great Britain	3	3	2	8
3	Romania	2	5	2	9
4	Switzerland	1	0	1	2
5	Italy	1	0	0	1
6	Azerbaijan	0	1	0	1
7	Germany	0	0	2	2
Totals (7 entries)		12	11	10	33

=== Seniors ===
Rank	Nation	Gold	Silver	Bronze	Total
1	Romania	2	1	1	4
2	Russia	1	1	3	5
3	Great Britain	1	1	0	2
4	Switzerland	1	0	1	2
5	Italy	1	0	0	1
6	Azerbaijan	0	1	0	1
Totals (6 entries)		6	4	5	15

=== Juniors ===
Rank	Nation	Gold	Silver	Bronze	Total
1	Russia	4	1	0	5
2	Great Britain	2	2	2	6
3	Romania	0	4	1	5
4	Germany	0	0	2	2
Totals (4 entries)		6	7	5	18

== Entries ==
National associations began announcing their selections in 2014.

Country	Senior	Junior
Austria	Elisa Hämmerle; Katharina Fa; Olivia Jochum; Hanna Grosch; Jasmin Mader	Bianca Frysak; Beatrice Stritzl; Linda Hamersak; Ceyda Sirbu
Azerbaijan	Yulia Inshina; Marina Nekrasova; Mariia Smirnova; Anna Pavlova	Anastasiia Bolshova
Belgium	Laura Waem; Lisa Verschueren; Gaelle Mys; Dorien Motten; Lin Versonnen	Axelle Klinckaert; Rune Hermans; Cindy Vandenhole; Jelle Beullens; Nina Derwael
Belarus	Katsiaryna Fiadutsik; Anastasiya Yekimenka; Yuliya Khramiankova; Natalia Karpovich; Anastasiya Miklashevich	Aliaksandra Koshaleva; Natalia Yakubava; Valeriya Tsekhmistrenka
Bulgaria	Valentina Rashkova; Ralitsa Mileva; Monika Romanova; Yanitsa Dobreva; Albena Zlatkova	Nicole Duneva; Iliana Gevezova; Magdalena Georgieva; Greta Banishka; Elizabet Vasileva
Croatia	Ana Đerek; Ana Poščić; Stella Petran; Ema Kajić; Petra Furač	Dora Kranželić; Jana Vrsalović
Cyprus	Rafaella Zannettou	Anastasia Theocharous
Czech Republic	Jana Šikulová; Kristýna Pálešová; Petra Fialová; Anna Maria Kányai	Veronika Cenková; Julie Hájková; Marie Nevrklová; Romana Majerechová; Barbora Fišerová
Denmark	Mette Hulgaard; Michelle Lauritsen; Mathilde Kirk; Sarah El Dabagh; Kirstine Søndergaard	Victoria Gilberg; Sara Strauss; Julie Krogsgaard; Linnea Wang; Clara Meincke
Spain	Roxana Popa; Cintia Rodríguez; Claudia Colom; Laura Gamell; Ana Pérez	Eva Pérez; Andrea Fernández; Elena Casado; Ana Palacios; Paula Norberto
Finland	Anna Pakkala	Anna Fihlman; Monica Sileoni; Anna Salmi; Riina Kaleva; Helmi Murto
France	Marine Brevet; Valentine Pikul; Youna Dufournet; Claire Martin; Valentine Sabatou	Loan His; Camille Bahl; Marine Boyer; Juliette Bossu; Océane Pause
United Kingdom	Ruby Harrold; Rebecca Tunney; Becky Downie; Hannah Whelan; Claudia Fragapane	Amy Tinkler; Catherine Lyons; Ellie Downie; Rhyannon Jones; Teal Grindle
Georgia	Nato Dzidziguri; Tamara Chachua	Magda Robakidze
Germany	Çağla Akyol; Pauline Schäfer; Sophie Scheder; Kim Bùi; Janine Berger	Tabea Alt; Maike Enderle; Carina Kröll; Rebecca Matzon; Pauline Tratz
Greece	Vasiliki Millousi; Maria Simou; Evangelia Plyta; Ioanna Xoulogi; Maria Trichopoulou	Zoi Toka; Mina Vartholomaiou; Christina Kiosk; Evangelia Monokrousou
Hungary	Dorina Böczögő; Tünde Csillag; Noémi Makra; Boglárka Tóth; Eszter Romhányi	Kitti Honti; Boglárka Dévai; Júlianna Csányi; Dóra Székely; Zsófia Kovács
Ireland	India McPeak; Nicole Mawhinney; Ellis O'Reilly; Sarah Beck; Ciara Roberts	Casey Bell; Niamh Rogers; Hannah Morrison; Emmeline Anghileri
Iceland	Andrea Órradóttir; Freyja Jósepsdóttir; Norma Róbertsdóttir; Sigriður Bergþorsdottir; Thelma Hermannsdóttir	Andrea Þorvaldsdóttir; Kristjana Kristinsdóttir; Lilja Ólafsdóttir; Nanna Guðmundsdóttir; Thelma Aðalsteinsdóttir
Israel	Gaya Giladi	Tzuf Feldon; Ofir Kremer; Lior Hasan; Yahali Shalit; Ron Dagan
Italy	Vanessa Ferrari; Erika Fasana; Elisa Meneghini; Giorgia Campana; Martina Rizzelli	Iosra Abdelaziz; Sofia Busato; Chiara Imeraj; Pilar Rubagotti; Desirée Carofiglio
Latvia	Valērija Grišāne; Diāna Jerofejeva; Sabīne Goša; Anastasija Dubova; Sabīne Kornijanova	Aleksandra Kurčenko; Alīna Circene
Lithuania	Laura Švilpaitė; Vaida Žitinevičiūtė	Gabrielė Blažytė; Agata Vostruchovaitė
Luxembourg	Conny Giussani	
Netherlands	Julia Bombach; Lisa Top; Lieke Wevers; Sanne Wevers; Vera van Pol	Wendy de Jong; Dyonnailys Supriana; Isa Maassen; Pien Jansen; Tisha Volleman
Norway	Dina Nygaard; Nora Munkvold; Katarina Rønbeck; Tiril Dovre; Anna Hansen	Martine Magnussen; Solveig Berg; Malene Ravn Gundersrud; Linn Finstad; Martine Skregelid
Poland	Marta Pihan-Kulesza; Katarzyna Jurkowska; Gabriela Janik; Paula Plichta; Alma Kuc	Maria Bieda; Wiktoria Łopuszańska; Klara Kopeć
Portugal	Ana Filipa Martins; Diana Abrantes	Sara Raposeiro; Mariana Pitrez; Catarina Moreira; Mariana Marianito
Romania	Larisa Iordache; Diana Bulimar; Andreea Munteanu; Ștefania Stănilă; Silvia Zarzu	Laura Jurcă; Andreea Iridon; Anda Butuc; Andra Stoica; Asiana Peng
Russia	Aliya Mustafina; Maria Kharenkova; Alla Sosnitskaya; Anna Rodionova; Daria Spiridonova	Maria Bondareva; Anastasia Dmitrieva; Angelina Melnikova; Seda Tutkhalyan; Daria Skrypnik
Slovenia	Saša Golob; Teja Belak	Lana Voler; Pia Belak; Lara Omahen; Neli Struc; Alenka Pipus
Serbia	Aleksandra Rajčić; Tamara Mrđenović	
Switzerland	Giulia Steingruber; Ilaria Käslin; Laura Schulte; Nadia Mülhauser; Stefanie Siegenthaler	Giada Grisetti; Thea Brogli; Gaia Nesurini; Anja Schwarz; Rebekka Schuster
Slovakia	Barbora Mokosová	Radoslava Kalamárová
Sweden	Jonna Adlerteg; Emma Larsson; Lovisa Estberg; Kim Singmuang; Nicole Wanström	Ellen Haavisto; Emmy Haavisto
Turkey	Demet Mutlu; Kamile Ahsen Göktekin	Ekin Morova; Cansu Altın; Tutya Yılmaz; Beyza Türkmen; Sudenur Demir
Ukraine	Angelina Kysla; Krystyna Sankova; Olena Vasylieva; Olesya Sazonova; Darya Matveieva	Iryna Sahaydak; Alona Seleznova; Yana Horokhova; Vlada Duylovska; Anastasiia Tkachenko

== Start List ==
=== Senior Qualification ===
Vault (gymnastics)	Uneven bars	Balance beam	Floor (gymnastics)
Subdivision 1
Norway	Finland	Bulgaria	Ukraine
Azerbaijan	Sweden	Czech Republic	Latvia
Subdivision 2
Luxembourg; Lithuania	Slovenia; Serbia	Austria	Greece
Denmark	Croatia	Switzerland	Georgia; Cyprus
Subdivision 3
Ireland	Belarus	Hungary	Slovakia; Israel
Iceland	Portugal; Turkey	Poland	Netherlands
Subdivision 4
Germany	Romania	Spain	France
Russia	Belgium	United Kingdom	Italy

=== Senior Team Final ===
Vault (gymnastics)	Uneven bars	Balance beam	Floor (gymnastics)
4	3	1	7
2	8	6	5

=== Senior Event Final ===
Start Order	Vault (gymnastics)	Uneven bars	Balance beam	Floor (gymnastics)
	Rank			
1	6	6	8	5
2	1	3	3	6
3	7	4	4	2
4	3	7	2	8
5	5	8	1	1
6	4	2	6	3
7	2	1	5	4
8	8	5	7	7

=== Junior Team Final ===
Vault (gymnastics)	Uneven bars	Balance beam	Floor (gymnastics)
Subdivision 1
Israel	Slovenia	Azerbaijan; Belarus	Ireland
Hungary	Denmark	Austria	
Subdivision 2
Georgia; Luxembourg	Norway	Lithuania; Cyprus	Belgium
Bulgaria	Spain	Finland	Sweden; Slovakia
Subdivision 3
Ireland	Latvia; Croatia	Turkey	Poland
Portugal	Czech Republic	Greece	Switzerland
Subdivision 4
France	Russia	Romania	United Kingdom
Netherlands	Germany	Ukraine	Italy

=== Junior All-Around Final ===
Vault (gymnastics)	Uneven bars	Balance beam	Floor (gymnastics)
2	20	14	18
24	15	6	9
11	13	16	10
19	7	21	8
4	1	17	5
12	22	3	23

=== Junior Event Final ===
Start Order	Vault (gymnastics)	Uneven bars	Balance beam	Floor (gymnastics)
	Rank			
1	3	7	5	2
2	2	2	8	6
3	6	8	1	4
4	5	5	3	1
5	7	6	6	7
6	4	1	7	3
7	8	4	4	5
8	1	3	2	8
