= Andreea Ciurusniuc =

Romanian artistic gymnast

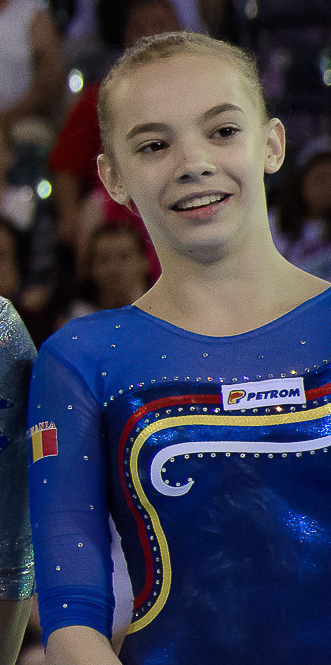
- Ciurusniuc at the 2016 Romanian Championships

Personal information
- Full name: Andreea Daniela Ciurusniuc
- Born: 28 May 2000 (age 26) Bucharest, Romania

Gymnastics career
- Discipline: Women's artistic gymnastics
- Country represented: Romania

Andreea Daniela Ciurusniuc (born 28 May 2000) is a Romanian former artistic gymnast. She won a bronze medal with the Romanian team at the 2014 Junior European Championships. She is the 2018 Romanian national champion on the uneven bars.

== Gymnastics career ==
=== Junior ===
Ciurusniuc competed at the 2014 Junior European Championships alongside Laura Jurca, Andreea Iridon, Anda Butuc, and Andra Stoica, and they won the bronze medal behind Russia and Great Britain. She then won a silver medal on the vault at the 2014 Romanian Championships, behind Larisa Iordache. She won the all-around silver medal behind Canada's Sydney Soloski at the 2014 Coupe Avenir and helped Romania win the team competition.

Ciurusniuc helped Romania finish third at the 2015 Four Nations Trophy. She then competed with the Romanian team that finished fourth at the 2015 European Youth Olympic Festival. At the 2015 Romanian Championships, she finished fourth in the balance beam final, missing the bronze medal by 0.050 points behind Anamaria Ocolișan. She then helped the Romanian team win the bronze medal at the 2015 Elite Gym Massilia.

=== Senior ===
Ciurusniuc became age-eligible for senior international competitions in 2016. She made her senior debut at the Encuentro Internacional and won a silver medal with the Romanian team. She won a bronze medal on the balance beam at the 2016 Romanian Championships behind Cătălina Ponor and Larisa Iordache. Additionally, she finished fourth in the vault final and sixth in the uneven bars final.

Ciurusniuc won the uneven bars title at the 2018 Romanian Championships and also finished tenth in the all-around. She then represented Romania at the 2019 Summer Universiade and qualified for the all-around final, finishing 14th.

== Competitive history ==
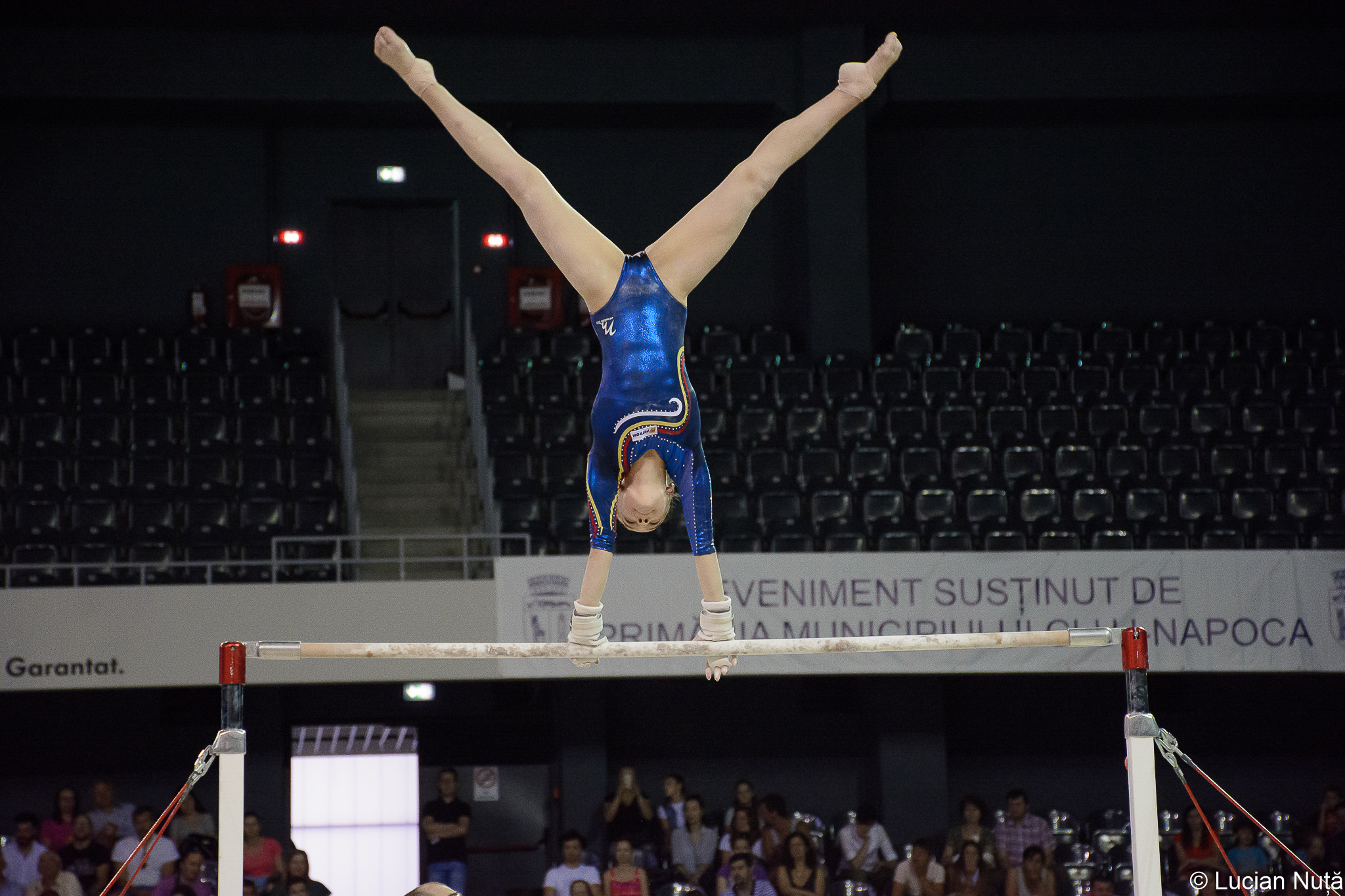
Ciurusniuc at the 2016 Romanian Championships

Competitive history of Andreea Ciurusniuc
Year	Event	Team	AA	VT	UB	BB	FX
Junior
2014	Beaumont en Veront	1st place, gold medalist(s)	11				
2014	Junior European Championships	3rd place, bronze medalist(s)					
2014	Romanian Championships		10	2nd place, silver medalist(s)	6		
2014	Coupe Avenir	1st place, gold medalist(s)	2nd place, silver medalist(s)	2nd place, silver medalist(s)	3rd place, bronze medalist(s)	2nd place, silver medalist(s)	3rd place, bronze medalist(s)
2015	Four Nations Trophy	3rd place, bronze medalist(s)	9				
2015	European Youth Olympic Festival	4					
2015	Romanian Championships		9			4	
2015	Elite Gym Massilia	3rd place, bronze medalist(s)	18				
Senior
2016	Encuentro Internacional	2nd place, silver medalist(s)	8				
2016	Romanian Championships	3rd place, bronze medalist(s)	7	4	6	3rd place, bronze medalist(s)	
2017	Romanian Championships	4	11	6	4		
2018	Romanian Championships		10		1st place, gold medalist(s)		
2019	Summer Universiade		14				
