= Gymnastics at the 2014 Summer Youth Olympics – Girls' artistic individual all-around =

Girls' All-Around at the II Summer Youth Olympic Games
- Venue: Nanjing Olympic Sports Center Gymnasium
- Date: 20 August
- Competitors: 18 from 18 nations
- Winning score: 54.900

Medalists
1st place, gold medalist(s)		Seda Tutkhalyan	Russia
2nd place, silver medalist(s)		Flávia Saraiva	Brazil
3rd place, bronze medalist(s)		Ellie Downie	Great Britain

The girl's artistic individual all-around at the 2014 Summer Youth Olympics was held on August 20 at the Nanjing Olympic Sports Centre.

== Qualification ==
Eighteen gymnasts qualified into the all-around final.

== Medalists ==
Gold	Silver	Bronze
Seda Tutkhalyan; Russia	Flávia Saraiva; Brazil	Ellie Downie; Great Britain

== Final results ==
Position	Gymnast	Vault (gymnastics)	Uneven bars	Balance beam	Floor (gymnastics)	Total
1st place, gold medalist(s)	Seda Tutkhalyan (RUS)	14.400	14.050	14.000	12.450	54.900
2nd place, silver medalist(s)	Flávia Saraiva (BRA)	13.900	12.950	14.050	13.800	54.700
3rd place, bronze medalist(s)	Ellie Downie (GBR)	14.750	13.350	13.150	12.900	54.150
4	Wang Yan (CHN)	14.650	11.950	13.400	13.800	53.800
5	Sae Miyakawa (JPN)	14.700	12.650	13.400	12.550	53.300
6	Iosra Abdelaziz (ITA)	13.750	13.350	12.500	12.950	52.550
7	Laura Jurca (ROU)	14.600	12.300	13.000	12.200	52.100
8	Camille Bahl (FRA)	13.650	12.100	12.300	12.700	50.750
9	Antonia Alicke (GER)	13.475	12.350	12.600	12.250	50.675
10	Tutya Yilmaz (TUR)	13.750	11.550	12.050	12.950	50.300
11	Ava Verdeflor (PHI)	12.900	12.450	12.850	11.600	49.800
12	Sydney Townsend (CAN)	13.600	12.600	11.950	11.650	49.800
13	Gaia Nesurini (SUI)	13.650	12.400	11.350	12.350	49.750
14	Veronika Cenkova (CZE)	12.750	11.750	12.600	12.500	49.600
15	Stephanie Hernandez (MEX)	13.350	12.150	11.400	12.450	49.450
16	Boglárka Dévai (HUN)	13.400	11.550	10.400	12.100	47.450
17	Natallia Yakubava (BLR)	12.150	12.400	11.200	11.600	47.350
18	Nadine Joy Nathan (SIN)	13.600	10.200	11.650	10.850	46.300

== Reserves ==
The reserves for the All Around Final were:

- Millie Williamson (NZL) (19th place)
- Martine Skregelid (NOR) (20th place)
- Veronika Orlova (UZB) (21st place)
- Paola Irizarry (PUR) (22nd place)
