= Gymnastics at the 2015 European Games – Women's floor exercise =

Sporting event

Women's floor exercise at the 2015 European Games
- Venue: National Gymnastics Arena
- Dates: 20 June 2015
- Competitors: 6 from 6 nations

The Women's artistic gymnastics floor exercise competition at the 2015 European Games was held in the National Gymnastics Arena, Baku, Azerbaijan on 20 June 2015.

== Medalists ==
| Gold | Silver | Bronze |
|---|---|---|
| Switzerland; Giulia Steingruber | Russia; Aliya Mustafina | Netherlands; Lieke Wevers |

== Qualification ==
The top six gymnasts with one per country advanced to the final.

| Rank | Gymnast | Nation | D Score | E Score | Pen. | Total | Qual. |
|---|---|---|---|---|---|---|---|
| 1 | Aliya Mustafina | Russia | 6.100 | 8.166 | 0.3 | 13.966 | Q |
| 2 | Silvia Zarzu | Romania | 5.700 | 8.233 | | 13.933 | Q |
| 3 | Lieke Wevers | Netherlands | 5.400 | 8.500 | | 13.900 | Q |
| 4 | Laura Jurca | Romania | 5.700 | 8.000 | | 13.700 | |
| 5 | Giulia Steingruber | Switzerland | 6.000 | 7.733 | 0.1 | 13.633 | Q |
| 6 | Lisa Verschueren | Belgium | 5.400 | 8.200 | | 13.600 | Q |
| 6 | Valentine Pikul | France | 5.400 | 8.200 | | 13.600 | Q |
| 8 | Gaelle Mys | Belgium | 5.500 | 8.100 | | 13.600 | |
| 9 | Seda Tutkhalyan | Russia | 5.700 | 7.900 | | 13.600 | |
| 10 | Kelly Simm | Great Britain | 5.800 | 7.800 | | 13.600 | R1 |
| 11 | Dorina Böczögő | Hungary | 5.400 | 8.166 | | 13.566 | R2 |
| 12 | Tea Ugrin | Italy | 5.500 | 8.066 | | 13.566 | R3 |

- The tie between Lisa Verschueren, Valentine Pikul, Gaelle Mys, Seda Tutkhalyan, and Kelly Simm for sixth place was broken by highest execution score. Lisa Verschueren and Valentine Pikul both received the same execution score, and because they also received the same difficulty score, the tie remained. The same process was followed to break the tie between Dorina Böczögő and Tea Ugrin.

== Results ==
Oldest and youngest competitors

| | Name | Country | Date of birth | Age |
|---|---|---|---|---|
| Youngest | Silvia Zarzu | Romania | December 16, 1998 | 16 years, 6 months and 4 days |
| Oldest | Lieke Wevers | Netherlands | September 17, 1991 | 23 years, 9 months and 3 days |

| Position | Gymnast | D Score | E Score | Penalty | Total |
|---|---|---|---|---|---|
| 1st place, gold medalist(s) | Giulia Steingruber (SUI) | 6.000 | 8.366 | 0.1 | 14.266 |
| 2nd place, silver medalist(s) | Aliya Mustafina (RUS) | 5.900 | 8.300 | | 14.200 |
| 3rd place, bronze medalist(s) | Lieke Wevers (NED) | 5.400 | 8.400 | | 13.800 |
| 4 | Lisa Verschueren (BEL) | 5.400 | 8.166 | | 13.566 |
| 5 | Silvia Zarzu (ROU) | 5.700 | 8.066 | 0.2 | 13.566 |
| 6 | Valentine Pikul (FRA) | 5.100 | 7.666 | | 12.766 |

- The tie between Lisa Verschueren and Silvia Zarzu for fourth place was broken by the execution score.
