= Camille Bahl =

French artistic gymnast

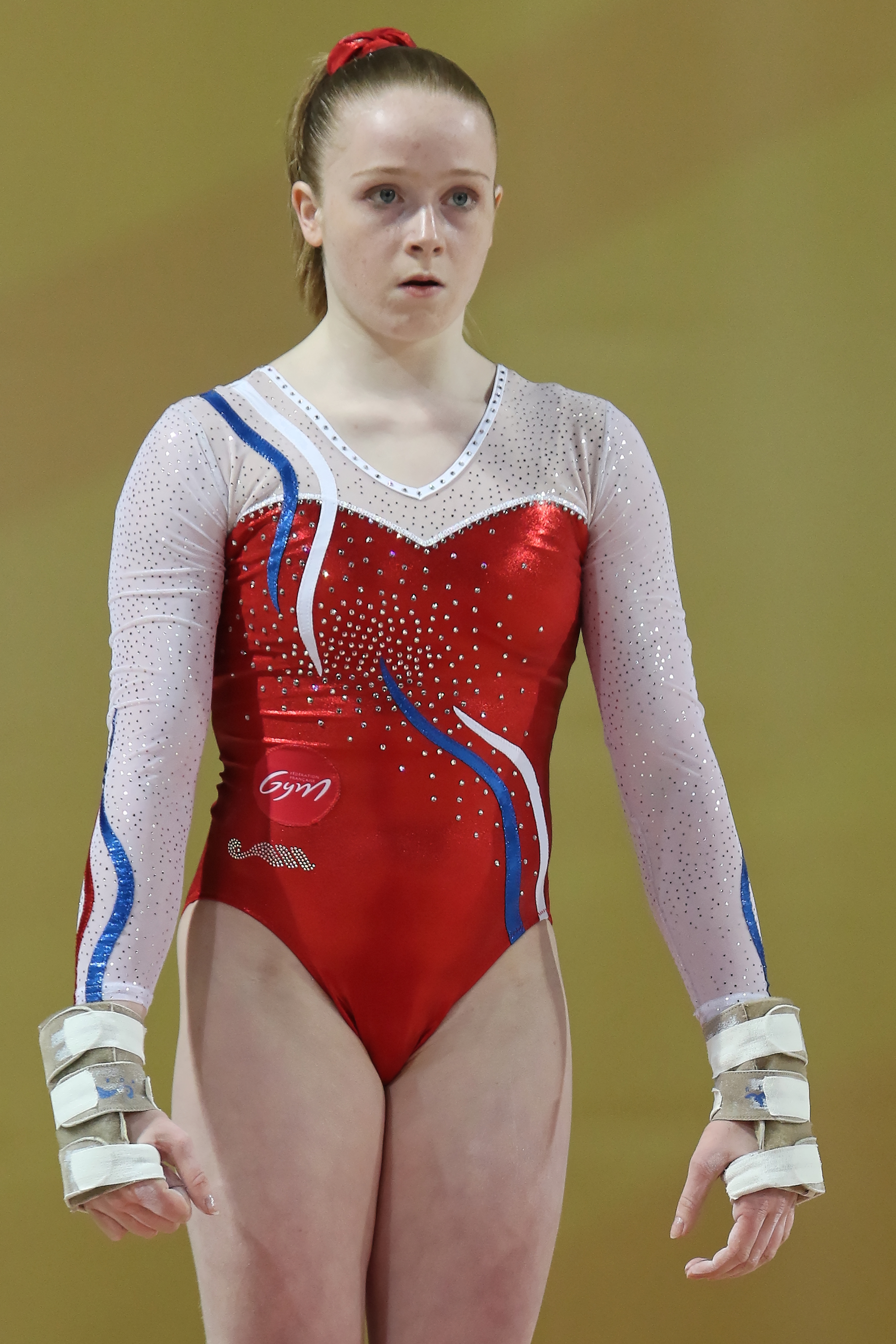
- Bahl at the 2015 European Championships

Personal information
- Born: 13 October 1999 (age 26) Schiltigheim, Alsace, France
- Height: 152 cm (5 ft 0 in)

Gymnastics career
- Discipline: Women's artistic gymnastics
- Country represented: France (2012-2016 (France))
- Club: Comb la ville
- Gym: INSEP
- Head coach: Veronique Legras Snoeck

Camille Bahl (born 13 October 1999) is a French artistic gymnast and former gymnast of the French national team. She represented France at the 2014 Summer Youth Olympics and the 2015 European Championships.

== Personal life ==
Camille Bahl was born on 13 October 1999, in Schiltigheim. She began gymnastics at the age of five in Oberhoffen-sur-Moder and was recruited to join the Union Haguenau club. She began training at the INSEP in the summer of 2014. She speaks French, English, and German.

== Career ==
=== Junior career: 2013–2014 ===
Bahl finished 7th in the junior all-around at the 2013 French Championships, and Union Haguenau won the team silver medal. At the 2014 French Championships, she finished 5th in the all-around and won the silver medal on vault behind Loan His, and Union Haguenau finished 4th. At a friendly meet against Romania and Belgium, the French team finished 3rd, and Bahl finished 6th in the all-around and won the bronze medal on the vault. She competed at the 2014 Junior European Championships alongside Loan His, Marine Boyer, Océane Pause, and Juliette Bossu, and they finished 7th as a team. She was then selected to compete at the 2014 Youth Olympic Games where she finished 8th in the all-around final. Her last competition of the season was the Élite Gym Massilia, where she finished 6th on vault, 8th with her team, and 24th in the all-around.

=== Senior career ===
==== 2015–2016 ====
Bahl made her senior debut at the 2015 French Championships, where she won the gold medal on the vault and finished 4th in the all-around. She competed at the 2015 City of Jesolo Trophy, where the French team finished 4th, and Bahl finished 4th on the vault and 8th on the floor exercise. She competed at the 2015 European Championships where she finished 7th in the vault event final. She competed at a friendly meet where the French team lost to Romania. Then at a friendly meet against Spain, the French team won, and Bahl won the gold medal on vault. She was the alternate for the French team at the 2015 World Championships. She won the bronze medal on vault at the Elite Gym Massilia and finished 4th in the all-around.

Bahl competed at the 2016 City of Jesolo Trophy, where the French team finished 4th. She pulled out of the Olympic Test Event and France's Olympic Trials due to an ankle injury. She continued to struggle with injuries and initially retired in March 2017.

==== Comeback: 2018–present ====
Bahl returned to competition in December 2018 at the Top 12 Series 2, where she only competed on the balance beam and helped Haguenau beat Combs la Ville.

In 2021, after a break, she returned to competition with her new club "Combs la Ville" and has since competed in the Top 12 Championships. At most meets she doesn't compete on bars.
