= Desiree Carofiglio =

Italian artistic gymnast

- Full name: Desiree Carofiglio
- Nickname: Desy
- Born: March 11, 2000 (age 26) Casarile, Italy

Gymnastics career
- Discipline: Women's artistic gymnastics
- Country represented: Italy (2014–present)
- Club: Fanfulla 1874
Medal record
Representing Italy
World Championships
Bronze medal – third place	2019 Stuttgart	Team

Desiree Carofiglio (born 11 March 2000) is an Italian artistic gymnast. She was part of the Italian team that won bronze at the 2019 World Championships.

== Personal life ==
Carofiglio was born in Casarile on 11 March 2000.

== Gymnastics career ==
=== Junior ===
==== 2014–15 ====
Carofiglio made her international debut at the 2014 City of Jesolo Trophy where she placed sixteenth in the all-around, eighth on vault, and sixth on balance beam. She later competed at a friendly competition in Munich where she placed thirteenth. In May she competed at the European Championships where she helped Italy place fifth in the team final and individually she placed seventh in the vault final. She later competed at the Italy National Championships where she placed seventeenth in the all-around and fifth on vault. In September Carofiglio competed at the Golden League where she won bronze on vault.

In 2015 Carofiglio competed at the Golden League, winning bronze in the team final and placing tenth in the all-around. At the Italian National Championships she placed eleventh in the all-around, third on vault, and seventh on balance beam.

=== Senior ===
==== 2016 ====
Carofiglio turned senior in 2016. She competed at the 1st Italian Serie A where she placed third in the all-around behind Giorgia Villa and Carlotta Ferlito and fourth in the team competition. She made her international senior debut at the 2016 City of Jesolo Trophy where she helped Italy finish third and individually she placed 22nd in the all-around, fifth on vault, and eighth on floor exercise.

==== 2017 ====
Carofiglio competed at the first Italian Serie A where her club placed third and individually she placed fourth in the all-around. She next competed at the 2017 City of Jesolo Trophy where she placed 21st in the all-around, fourth on vault, and fifth in the team final. At the second Italian Serie A she placed third in the all-around behind Martina Maggio and Asia D'Amato. Carofiglio competed at the Italian Gold Championships in May where she won silver in the all-around and on vault behind Maggio, fifth on uneven bars and balance beam, and won gold on floor exercise. In June she competed at the FIT Challenge where she placed 12th in the all-around and helped Italy win gold. At the Italian National Championships Carofiglio placed sixth in the all-around, second on vault behind D'Amato, and fourth on floor exercise. In October Carofiglio competed at the 2017 World Championships but did not qualify for any event finals.

==== 2018 ====
Carofiglio competed at the first Italian Serie A where she placed fourth in the all-around behind Giorgia Villa, Asia D'Amato, and Alice D'Amato. In April she competed at the City of Jesolo Trophy where she helped Italy win bronze and individually she placed fifteenth in the all-around, sixth on vault, and won bronze on floor exercise, tied with Grace McCallum. In June Carofiglio had surgery on her knee and was out for the remainder of the season.

==== 2019 ====
Carofiglio competed at the 2019 City of Jesolo Trophy where she helped Italy place third and individually she placed tenth in the all-around, second on vault, and fifth on floor exercise. She later competed at a friendly competition in Heerenveen where she helped Italy place first and individually she placed sixth in the all-around. At the Italian National Championships Carofiglio placed second in the all-around behind Asia D'Amato, fourth on vault, uneven bars, and balance beam, and won gold on floor exercise.

On September 4 Carofiglio was named to the team to compete at the 2019 World Championships in Stuttgart, Germany alongside D'Amato, Alice D'Amato, Giorgia Villa, and Elisa Iorio.

During qualifications at the World Championships Carofiglio helped Italy qualify to the team final in eighth place; as a result Italy also qualified to the 2020 Olympic Games in Tokyo. In the team final, Carofiglio helped Italy win the bronze medal – Italy's first team medal since the 1950 World Artistic Gymnastics Championships. They ended up finishing behind the United States and Russia but ahead of China, who originally qualified to the final in second place.

==== 2020 ====
Carofiglio was selected to represent Italy at the Birmingham World Cup taking place in March. However the Birmingham World Cup was later canceled due to the COVID-19 pandemic in the United Kingdom. In October Carofiglio injured her Achilles tendon.

==== 2021 ====
Carofiglio returned to competition at the 2021 Italian national championships where she only competed on balance beam and uneven bars. Although she was not sufficiently recovered enough to be selected to represent Italy at the Olympic Games, she was selected to compete at the 2021 World Championships.

== Competitive history ==
Year	Event	Team	AA	VT	UB	BB	FX
Junior
2014	City of Jesolo Trophy	3rd place, bronze medalist(s)	16	8		6	
2014	Munich Friendly		13				
2014	European Championships	5		7			
2014	Italian Championships		17	5			
2014	Golden League		19	3rd place, bronze medalist(s)			
2015	1st Italian Serie A	8					
2015	2nd Italian Serie A	10					
2015	3rd Italian Serie A	11					
2015	4th Italian Serie A	11					
2015	Golden League	3rd place, bronze medalist(s)	10				
2015	Italian Championships		11	3rd place, bronze medalist(s)		7	
Senior
2016	1st Italian Serie A	4	3rd place, bronze medalist(s)				
2016	2nd Italian Serie A	6	16				
2016	City of Jesolo Trophy	3rd place, bronze medalist(s)	22	5			8
2016	3rd Italian Serie A	4	8				
2016	4th Italian Serie A	5	6				
2017	1st Italian Serie A	3rd place, bronze medalist(s)	4				
2017	City of Jesolo Trophy	5	21	4			
2017	2nd Italian Serie A	2nd place, silver medalist(s)	3rd place, bronze medalist(s)				
2017	3rd Italian Serie A	3rd place, bronze medalist(s)	8				
2017	Italian Gold Championships		2nd place, silver medalist(s)	2nd place, silver medalist(s)	5	5	1st place, gold medalist(s)
2017	FIT Challenge	1st place, gold medalist(s)	12				
2017	Italian Championships		6	2nd place, silver medalist(s)			4
2017	4th Italian Serie A	2nd place, silver medalist(s)	4				
2018	1st Italian Serie A	7	4				
2018	City of Jesolo Trophy	3rd place, bronze medalist(s)	15	6			3rd place, bronze medalist(s)
2018	2nd Italian Serie A	3rd place, bronze medalist(s)	10	6			
2018	3rd Italian Serie A	3rd place, bronze medalist(s)	3rd place, bronze medalist(s)	2nd place, silver medalist(s)			
2019	1st Italian Serie A	1st place, gold medalist(s)	1st place, gold medalist(s)				
2019	City of Jesolo Trophy	3rd place, bronze medalist(s)	10	2nd place, silver medalist(s)			5
2019	2nd Italian Serie A	7	4				
2019	3rd Italian Serie A	1st place, gold medalist(s)	1st place, gold medalist(s)				
2019	Heerenveen Friendly	1st place, gold medalist(s)	6				
2019	Italian Championships		2nd place, silver medalist(s)	4	4	4	1st place, gold medalist(s)
2019	World Championships	3rd place, bronze medalist(s)					
2020	1st Italian Serie A	8	1st place, gold medalist(s)				
2021	National Championships				5		
2022	DTB Pokal Mixed Cup	3rd place, bronze medalist(s)					
