= Agata Vostruchovaitė =

Lithuanian artistic gymnast

- Full name: Agata Vostruchovaitė
- Born: 2 December 2000 (age 25) Vilnius, Lithuania

Gymnastics career
- Discipline: Women's artistic gymnastics
- Country represented: Lithuania (2013 – Present)
- Club: Vilnius City Sports Centre
- Head coach: Inga Levanienė
Medal record
Women's artistic gymnastics
Representing Lithuania
FIG World Cup
Event	1st	2nd	3rd
World Challenge Cup	0	0	1
Total	0	0	1
- Education: Lithuanian Sports University

Agata Vostruchovaitė (born 2 December 2000) is a Lithuanian artistic gymnast and was the 2016 Lithuanian national champion. She represented Lithuania at the 2017 and 2019 World Championships.

== Early life ==
Vostruchovaitė was born in Vilnius in 2000. She began gymnastics when she was four years old.

== Gymnastics career ==
=== 2014–15 ===
Vostruchovaitė competed at the 2014 Junior European Championships. In 2015 she competed at the European Youth Olympic Festival alongside Diana Balkytė and they finished 25th as a team. Individually Vostruchovaitė placed 52nd in the all-around during qualification. She next competed at the Bosphorus Tournament where she placed sixth.

=== 2016–17 ===
Vostruchovaitė became age-eligible for senior-level competition in 2016. She made her senior debut at the Antonia Koshel Cup where she finished sixth in the all-around. She placed first at the Lithuanian national championships. At the 2016 European Championships Vostruchovaitė finished 33rd during qualifications.

At the 2017 European Championships Vostruchovaitė finished 72nd in the all-around qualifications. She next competed at the Szombathely Challenge Cup but did not qualify for any event finals. Vostruchovaitė was selected to represent Lithuania at the 2017 World Championships; she finished 72nd in qualifications.

=== 2018–19 ===
Vostruchovaitė competed at Gym Festival Trnava where she placed 19th in the all-around and fourth on vault. At the 2018 European Championships, while practicing on vault, Vostruchovaitė strained her knee ligaments.

Vostruchovaitė returned to competition at the 2019 Lithuanian Championships where she only competed on uneven bars; she placed second behind Greta Semionova. She competed at the 2019 World Championships but did not qualify for any event finals nor did she qualify to the 2020 Olympic Games.

=== 2020–21 ===
At the 2020 European Championships Vostruchovaitė placed thirteenth on vault during qualifications but did not qualify for the event final.

At the 2021 Lithuanian national championships Vostruchovaitė placed third in the all-around behind Ūla Bikinaitė and Ema Pleškytė. She placed first on vault. At the 2021 European Championships Vostruchovaitė finished 71st in the all-around qualifications and 14th on vault. She next competed at the Ukrainian International Cup where she placed eighth in the all-around, third on vault, and sixth on balance beam. Vostruchovaitė competed at the Mersin Challenge Cup where she placed third on vault behind Csenge Bácskay and Tjaša Kysselef.

== Competitive history ==
Year	Event	Team	AA	VT	UB	BB	FX
Junior
2015	Euro Youth Olympic Festival	25	54				
2015	Bosphorus Tournament		6				
Senior
2016	Antonia Koshel Cup		6				
2016	LTU National Championships		1st place, gold medalist(s)				
2016	Gym Festival Trnava		12	4			
2016	European Championships		33				
2017
2017	European Championships		72				
2017	World Championships		72				
2018	Gym Festival Trnava		19	4			
2019	LTU National Championships				2nd place, silver medalist(s)		
2019	World Championships		136				
2020	Tiger Cup				2nd place, silver medalist(s)		
2020	LTU National Championships			1st place, gold medalist(s)			
2020	European Championships			13			
2021	LTU National Championships		3rd place, bronze medalist(s)	1st place, gold medalist(s)	8	5	2nd place, silver medalist(s)
2021	European Championships		71	14			
2021	Ukrainian International Cup		8	3rd place, bronze medalist(s)		6	
2021	Mersin Challenge Cup			3rd place, bronze medalist(s)			
2023	Cottbus World Cup			7			
2023	Doha World Cup			6			
