= Gaia Nesurini =

Swiss artistic gymnast

- Born: 4 December 1999 (age 26)
- Height: 1.62 m (5 ft 4 in)

Gymnastics career
- Discipline: Women's artistic gymnastics
- Country represented: Switzerland
- Club: SFG Bellinzona
- Head coach: Alberto Tolomini
- Retired: 3 October 2018

Gaia Nesurini (born 4 December 1999) is a Swiss retired artistic gymnast who represented her country at the 2014 Summer Youth Olympics.

== Personal life ==
Nesurini was born on 4 December 1999. She is from Ticino, and her native language is Italian.

== Gymnastics career ==
=== Junior ===
Nesurini started the 2013 season by competing at the City of Jesolo Trophy where she competed on vault, balance beam, and floor exercise, but she did not qualify for any event finals. She also competed at the Lugano Trophy, where she finished ninth with a score of 48.400. She helped the Swiss team finish seventeenth at the 2013 European Youth Olympic Festival.

Nesurini competed at the 2014 Munich Friendly where the Swiss Junior team finished fourth, and individually, she finished twenty-first in the all-around with a score of 48.250. At the 2014 Junior European Championships Nesurini finished twenty-seventh in the all-around and did not qualify for the final due to the two-per country rule. The Swiss team finished eighth which was a massive improvement after not placing at the 2012 Junior European Championships.

Nesurini was selected to compete at the 2014 Summer Youth Olympics for Switzerland. She qualified for the all-around final in eleventh place with a score of 50.425. In the all-around final, she finished thirteenth with a score of 49.750.

=== Senior ===
Nesurini made her senior international debut at the 2015 Cottbus World Cup where she finished fifteenth on uneven bars, twenty-third on balance beam, and twenty-sixth on floor exercise in the qualification round. She also competed at the 2015 Ljubljana World Cup where she finished fourteenth on beam and twenty-second on floor in the qualification round. At the 2016 National Championships, Nesurini finished fourth in the all-around. Nesurini was not selected to represent Switzerland at the 2016 Olympics, but she continued to compete. At the 2017 National Championships, she won the silver medal on vault behind Giulia Steingruber, and she won the bronze medal on balance beam. In 2018, she competed at the 1st Bundesliga in Stuttgart, Germany where she finished fourteenth in the all-around.

Nesurini announced her retirement on 3 October 2018 in an Instagram post saying, "Gymnastics has made me the woman I am now, but recently, I have had to make the hardest choice of my life; to stop. Unfortunately, my body and my head can no longer move forward. This sport has been my life for 15 years, and it was not at all easy to decide. I wanted to thank all the people who supported me in these wonderful years."

== Competitive history ==
Competitive history of Gaia Nesurini
Year	Event	Team	AA	VT	UB	BB	FX
2013	Lugano Trophy		9				
2013	European Youth Olympic Festival	17					
2014	Munich Friendly	4	21				
2014	Junior European Championships	8					
2014	Youth Olympic Games		13				
2014	KSI Matsz Cup		5				
2016	Swiss Championships		4				
2017	Swiss Championships			2nd place, silver medalist(s)		3rd place, bronze medalist(s)	
