= Valentine Pikul =

French artistic gymnast

- Born: 4 September 1997 (age 29) Amiens, France

Gymnastics career
- Discipline: Women's artistic gymnastics
- Country represented: France; (2012-2016)
- Club: Henin Gym
- Retired: 2016

Valentine Pikul (born 4 September 1997) is a French former artistic gymnast. She competed for France at the 2015 European Games and at the 2015 World Championships.

== Gymnastics career ==
Pikul made her international debut at the 2012 International Gymnix in Montreal where the French team won the bronze medal. Individually, Pikul finished 7th in the uneven bars event final. Then at the 2012 Junior European Championships, she competed with Louise Vanhille, Claire Martin, Clara Chambellant, and Maëlys Plessis, and the team finished 7th. Pikul finished 21st in the all-around final.

Pikul made her senior debut at the 2014 French Championships where she won the silver medals in the all-around, uneven bars, and balance beam behind Youna Dufournet and on vault behind Marine Brevet. She competed at the 2014 European Championships alongside Brevet, Dufournet, Claire Martin, and Valentine Sabatou, and the team finished 11th in the qualification round. At the Élite Gym Massilia in Marseille, she finished 5th in the all-around.

At the 2015 French Championships, Pikul finished 4th on the uneven bars. She competed at the 2015 City of Jesolo Trophy where the French team finished 4th, and Pikul finished 5th in the uneven bars event final with a score of 14.050. She then competed at the 2015 European Games alongside Marine Brevet and Anne Kuhm, and they finished 4th in the team competition. Pikul finished 8th in the all-around final with a total score of 52.999, and she finished 6th in the floor exercise event final. She was then selected to compete at the 2015 World Championships with Marine Brevet, Loan His, Anne Kuhm, Claire Martin, and Louise Vanhille, and they finished 10th in the qualification round.

At the 2016 French Championships, Pikul finished 9th in the all-around. She was not selected for the 2016 Olympic Team, and she then retired due to injuries.
