= Veronika Cenková =

Czech artistic gymnast

- Nickname: Ceci
- Born: 11 February 1999 (age 27) Ostrava, Czech Republic

Gymnastics career
- Discipline: Women's artistic gymnastics
- Country represented: Czech Republic; (2013–2018)
- Club: Sokol Moravská Ostrava
Medal record
Women's artistic gymnastics
Representing Czech Republic
FIG World Cup
Event	1st	2nd	3rd
World Challenge Cup	0	1	1

Veronika Cenková (born 11 February 1999) is a Czech former artistic gymnast. She represented the Czech Republic at the 2014 Summer Youth Olympics and at the 2015 European Games. She is the 2016 and 2017 Czech all-around champion. At the 2016 Szombathely World Challenge Cup, she won two medals.

== Gymnastics career ==
=== Junior ===
Cenková advanced into the all-around final at the 2014 Junior European Championships and finished 21st. She then competed at the 2014 Summer Youth Olympics and finished 14th in the all-around final. She also advanced into the balance beam final and finished sixth.

=== Senior ===
Cenková became age-eligible for senior competitions in 2015. She competed at the 2015 European Championships and was the fourth reserve for the all-around final. She then represented the Czech Republic at the 2015 European Games and helped the team finish 15th. Individually, she was the third reserve for the all-around final. At the 2015 World Championships, she finished 125th in the all-around qualifications.

Cenková finished eighth in the floor exercise final at the 2016 Cottbus World Challenge Cup. She won the all-around title at the 2016 Czech Championships. She won the balance beam bronze medal and the floor exercise silver medal at the 2016 Szombathely World Challenge Cup. In 2017, she successfully defended her national all-around title, and she won national titles on the uneven bars, balance beam, and floor exercise. She finished 49th in the all-around at the 2017 European Championships. She competed at the 2017 World Championships and finished 48th in the all-around qualifications. She stopped competing in 2018.
