= Gymnastics at the 2016 Summer Olympics – Women's floor =

Women's floor at the Games of the XXXI Olympiad
- Venue: HSBC Arena
- Date: 16 August 2016
- Competitors: 14 from 8 nations
- Winning score: 15.966

Medalists
1st place, gold medalist(s)		Simone Biles	United States
2nd place, silver medalist(s)		Aly Raisman	United States
3rd place, bronze medalist(s)		Amy Tinkler	Great Britain

The women's floor competition at the 2016 Summer Olympics was held at the HSBC Arena on 16 August.

Simone Biles and Aly Raisman of the United States finished first and second in qualifications and then won the gold and silver medals in the event final. Raisman was the defending Olympic champion on floor. For Biles, it was her fourth gold medal and fifth overall medal of the 2016 Olympics.

== Competition format ==
The top 8 qualifiers in the qualification phase (limit two per NOC), based on combined score of each apparatus, advanced to the individual all-around final. The finalists performed on each apparatus again. Qualification scores were then ignored, with only final round scores counting.

== Qualification ==
The gymnasts who rank in the top eight qualify for the final round, with a maximum of two gymnasts from any single NOC eligible to move to the finals. When more than two competitors from one country finish in the top eight, the gymnast(s) who are third or lower ranked from that country are replaced by the next best ranking gymnast.

Rank	Gymnast	Nation	D Score	E Score	Pen.	Total	Qual.
1	Simone Biles	United States	6.800	8.933		15.733	Q
2	Aly Raisman	United States	6.600	8.675		15.275	Q
3	Vanessa Ferrari	Italy	6.200	8.666		14.866	Q
4	Laurie Hernandez	United States	6.000	8.800		14.800	–
5	Giulia Steingruber	Switzerland	6.200	8.466		14.666	Q
6	Wang Yan	China	6.300	8.366		14.666	Q
7	Amy Tinkler	Great Britain	6.300	8.300		14.600	Q
8	Mai Murakami	Japan	6.200	8.366		14.566	Q
9	Gabby Douglas	United States	6.100	8.366	−0.100	14.366	–
10	Erika Fasana	Italy	6.200	8.133		14.333	Q
11	Claudia Fragapane	Great Britain	6.600	7.733		14.333	R1
12	Pauline Schäfer	Germany	5.700	8.600		14.300	R2
13	Elisa Meneghini	Italy	5.600	8.633		14.233	–
14	Cătălina Ponor	Romania	5.900	8.300		14.200	R3

Only two gymnasts from each country may advance to the floor exercise final. Therefore, in some cases, a third and/or fourth gymnast placed high enough to qualify, but did not advance to the final because of the quota. Gymnasts who did not advance to the final, but had high enough scores to do so were:

- Laurie Hernandez (USA) (4th place)
- Gabby Douglas (USA) (9th place)

== Final ==
Rank	Name	Difficulty	Execution	Penalty	Total
1st place, gold medalist(s)	Simone Biles (USA)	6.900	9.066		15.966
2nd place, silver medalist(s)	Aly Raisman (USA)	6.600	8.900		15.500
3rd place, bronze medalist(s)	Amy Tinkler (GBR)	6.400	8.533		14.933
4	Vanessa Ferrari (ITA)	6.300	8.466		14.766
5	Wang Yan (CHN)	6.300	8.366		14.666
6	Erika Fasana (ITA)	6.100	8.433		14.533
7	Mai Murakami (JPN)	6.300	8.233		14.533
8	Giulia Steingruber (SUI)	5.400	6.700	−0.300	11.800

The medals were presented by Larry Probst, IOC member, and Ali Zaater, FIG Executive Committee Member.
