= Amy Tinkler =

British artistic gymnast (born 1999)

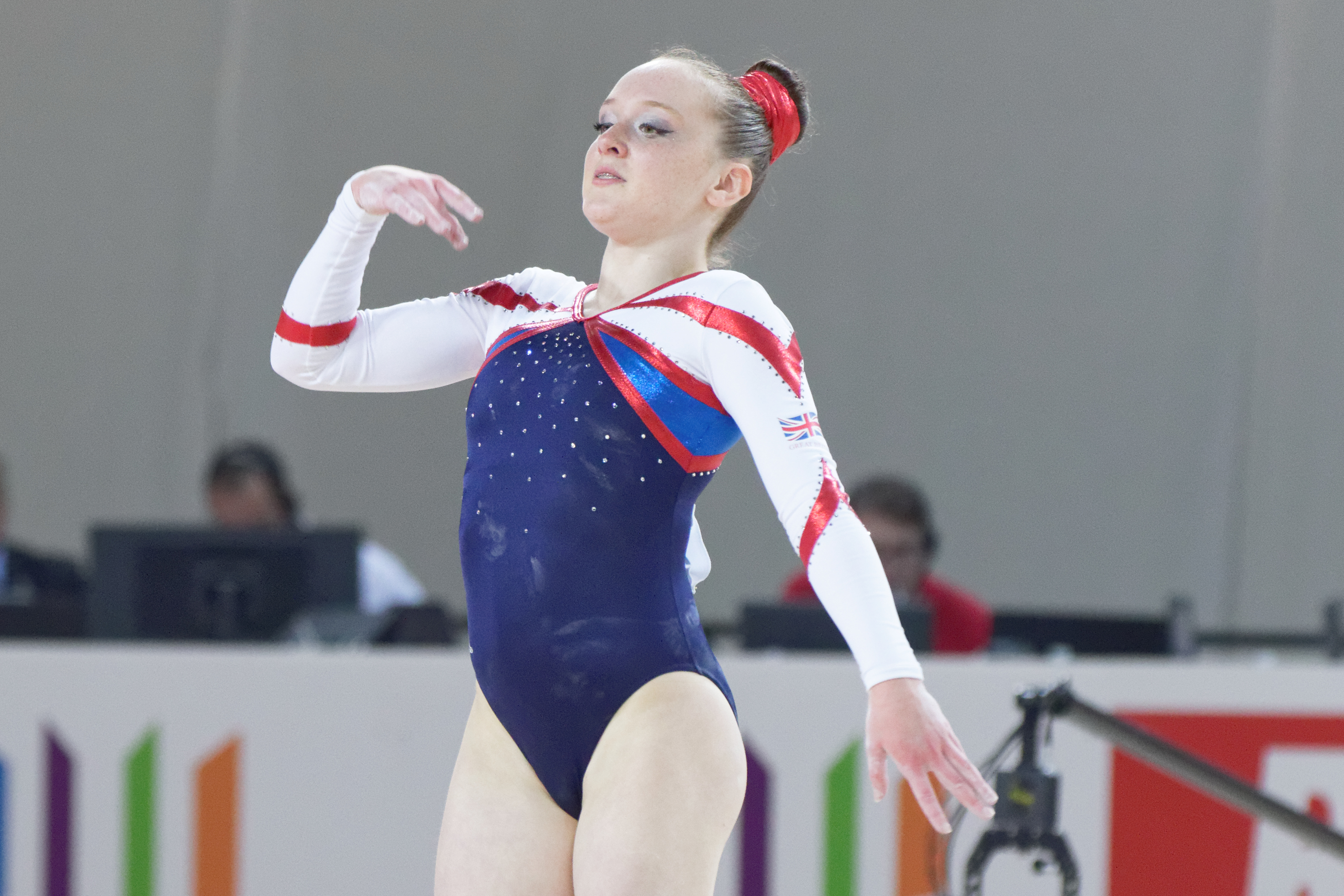
- Tinkler at the 2015 European Artistic Gymnastics Championships

Personal information
- Born: 27 October 1999 (age 26) Durham, United Kingdom
- Height: 152 cm (5 ft 0 in)

Gymnastics career
- Discipline: Women's artistic gymnastics
- Country represented: (United Kingdom) Great Britain (2012–2020)
- Club: South Essex Gymnastics Club (2016–20); South Durham (until 2016)
- Head coach: Ross Falsetta
- Assistant coach: Scott Hann
- Former coaches: Rachael Wright; Nicola Preston
- Retired: 15 January 2020
Medal record
Women's artistic gymnastics
Representing Great Britain
Olympic Games
Bronze medal – third place	2016 Rio de Janeiro	Floor Exercise
World Championships
Bronze medal – third place	2015 Glasgow	Team
FIG World Cup
Event	1st	2nd	3rd
All-Around World Cup	0	0	1
World Challenge Cup	0	0	1
Total	0	0	2

Amy Tinkler (born 27 October 1999) is a retired British artistic gymnast. She is the 2016 Olympic floor exercise bronze medallist and the 2015 British all-around champion.

== Junior career ==
=== 2013 ===
In late March, Tinkler competed at the 2013 British Artistic Championships. In the All-Around competition Tinkler took second place with a final score of 53.800. She scored 14.050 in the vault, 12.100 on the uneven bars, 13.650 on the balance beam and 14.000 on the floor exercise. She competed in all four apparatus finals. In the vault final, Tinkler scored 14.100 for her first vault and 13.400 for her second vault for an average total of 13.750, which gave her the silver medal. Tinkler took the Gold medal on the uneven bars with a score of 12.900. In the beam final, she posted a score of 13.400, earning her the bronze medal, and in floor exercise final she scored 14.200 and became the floor exercise champion.

In July, Tinkler took part in the 2013 European Youth Olympic Festival in Utrecht, Netherlands. She was one third of the Great British silver medal-winning team. Due to only the 2 highest scores counting in each four apparatuses, the only score contributing to Great Britain's final score of 109.750 was her floor exercise result of 13.400, despite posting a 14.600 on the vault, 11.550 on the uneven bars and 12.900 on the balance beam.

=== 2014 ===
In March Tinkler competed at the 2014 British Artistic Gymnastics Championships, her second Junior British Championships after her first in 2013. She became the Junior All-Around champion with a winning score of 55.250. She scored 14.650 on vault, 13.150 on the uneven bars, 13.350 on the balance beam and 14.100 on the floor exercise. In an interview with British Gymnastics, Tinkler said "It’s amazing to win, I can’t believe it really I’m just so happy! I just came in and wanted to do my job and have a good competition". As in the 2013 British Championships, Tinkler competed in all four event finals. In the Vault final, Tinkler's first vault scored 14.750 and her second scored 14.150 for an average total of 14.450 earning her the silver medal behind 2013 All-Around champion, Tyesha Mattis. She placed fourth in the uneven bars final with a score of 13.250. Tinkler won the bronze medal in the balance beam final with a score of 12.850. Tinkler shared first place on the floor exercise with Catherine Lyons with a score of 13.600.

In May, Tinkler attended the 2014 European Artistic Gymnastics Championships in Sofia, Bulgaria. She helped the British junior team to a historic team silver medal, contributing scores of 14.666 on the vault and 13.733 on the floor exercise. In the event finals, Tinkler won the bronze medal on the vault behind gold medalist and teammate Ellie Downie. Her first vault scored 14.733 and her second vault scored 13.966 for an average of 14.349. Tinkler also qualified for the floor exercise final, where she tied for second place with Romanian Andreea Iridon behind teammate Catherine Lyons with 13.966. Tinkler contributed two individual medals to Great Britain's largest junior haul with a total of 6 medals, two gold, 2 silver and 2 bronze medals.

== Senior career ==
=== 2015 ===
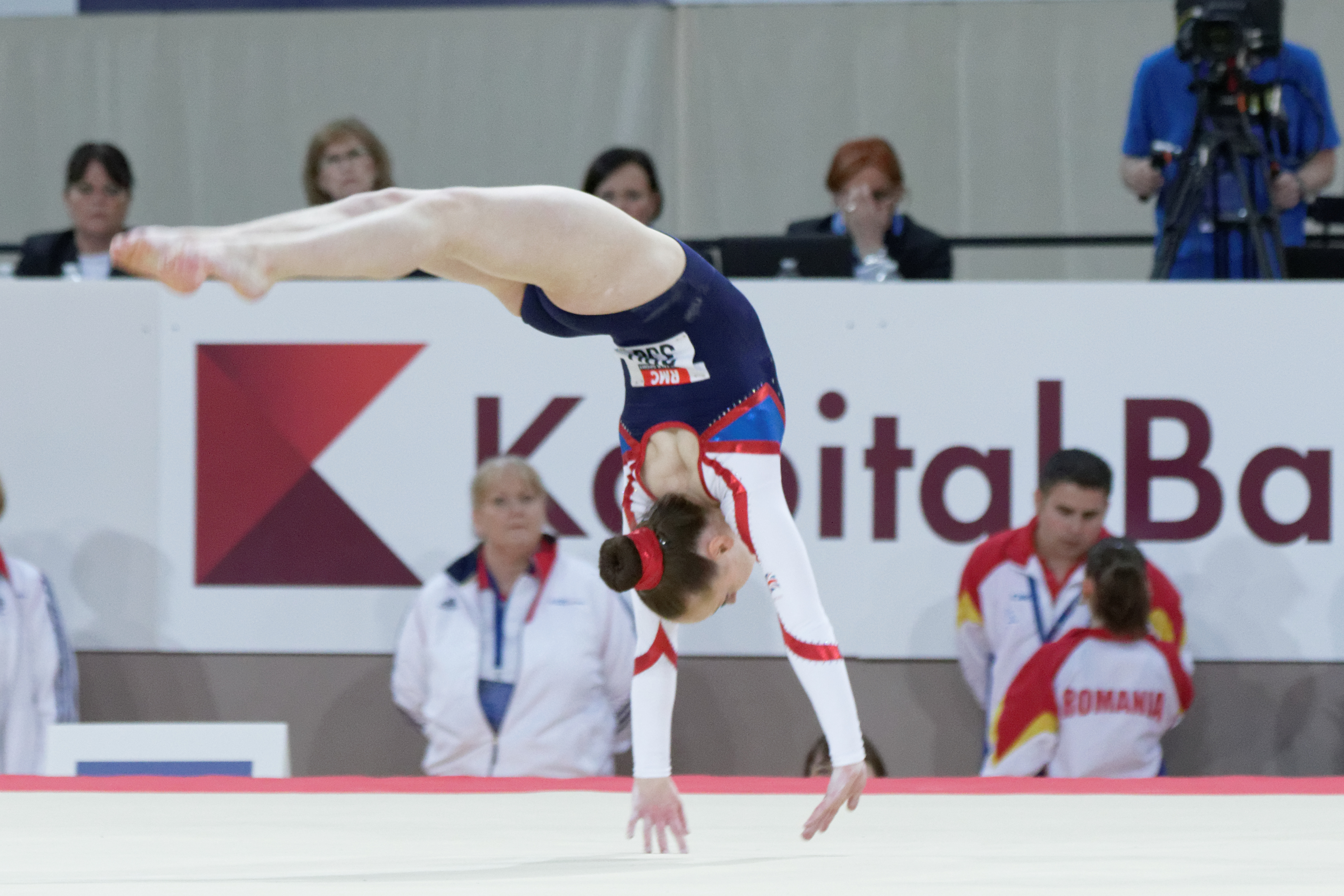
Amy Tinkler competes on 19 April 2015 in the floor final of the European Artistic Gymnastics Championships.

At the beginning of March, Tinkler made her senior debut at the English National Championships, at the Sir David Wallace Hall in Loughborough. She became the new senior all-around champion, previous 2014 champion Ruby Harrold had not competed in 2015. Tinkler scored 14.650 on the vault, 14.050 on the uneven bars, 13.800 on the balance beam and 13.700 on the floor exercise for a total of 56.200. She won by a margin of 1.300 points to Commonwealth all-around champion Claudia Fragapane who took second place with a total of 54.900.

Towards the end of March, Tinkler competed at the British Championships at the Echo Arena in Liverpool. In the all-around final she became the British champion and like in the English Championships, the winner from 2014, Rebecca Tunney didn't attend this competition. She scored 14.850 on the vault. 13.650 on the uneven bars, 13.750 on the balance beam and 14.400 on the floor exercise to improve on the English Championships result of 56.200 to end with a total of 56.650. Tinkler competed in 3 out of the 4 apparatus finals, in the uneven bars final, Tinkler placed 4th with a score of 13.300, and in the balance beam final she finished in 5th place with a score of 12.550, although in the floor exercise final, Tinkler won the gold medal with a score of 14.450, beating Commonwealth floor exercise champion and fan favourite, Claudia Fragapane.

On 2 April, Tinkler was chosen to be part of the 2015 European Championships held in Montpellier, France from 15 to 19 April alongside teammates Becky and Ellie Downie and Claudia Fragapane. This was her first major international competition as a senior gymnast.

Tinkler competed at the 6th Men's and Women's European Championships on 15 April, in the all-around qualifications she scored 14.625 on the vault, 13.300 on the uneven bars, 12.833 on the balance beam and 14.200 on the floor exercise, for a total of 54.958 and finishing in 6th place. Unfortunately due to the two-per-country rule, Tinkler failed to qualify for the final after Ellie Downie finished in 3rd place with 56.190 and Claudia Fragapane qualified in 5th-place finishing less than a tenth of a point, 0.073, in front of Tinkler. Although she did qualify in third place for the floor exercise final behind 2014 European bronze medalist Giulia Steingruber and 2011 world champion, Ksenia Afanasyeva. In the final, Tinkler posted a solid score of 14.000 to finish in 6th place at her first senior European Championships.

In September, Tinkler competed at the British Team Championships, where she helped the South Durham Gymnastics Club finish in fourth place contributing 14.300 on the vault, 13.600 on the uneven bars, 13.200 on the balance beam and 13.600 on the floor exercise, also making her first all-around in the competition.

=== 2016 ===
Tinkler competed at the 2016 AT&T American Cup in Newark, New Jersey on 5 March 2016. She came fourth with a score of 55.932 Later that month, Tinkler finished second in the all-around at the 2016 English Championships, behind Claudia Fragapane. In July, British Gymnastics announced that she had been selected as a member of the British team at the 2016 Summer Olympics in Rio. At age 16, she was the youngest member of Team GB. Tinkler won the bronze medal in the floor exercise with a score of 14.933, finishing behind Americans Simone Biles and Aly Raisman. She was the second British woman, after Beth Tweddle, to win a gymnastics medal in Olympics history. Following the Olympics, Tinkler left her gym, South Durham in Spennymoor to train at South Essex Gymnastics Club in Basildon.

=== 2017 ===
Tinkler competed at the American Cup, after the withdrawal of Rebecca Tunney and finished ninth in the all-around after withdrawing from the Floor Exercise. At the British Championships that year, she only competed on the uneven bars. In April, Tinkler competed at the London World Cup, coming in third behind Tabea Alt of Germany and Victoria Nguyen of the United States. Following these competitions, she had surgery on her knee, to remove pieces of floating bone.

She returned to competition in September, competing at the Szombathely Challenge Cup and the British Team Championships. In September, Tinkler was named to the team for the World Championships in Montreal, along with Georgia-Mae Fenton, Claudia Fragapane and Alice Kinsella. At the World Championships, she qualified thirteenth to the all-around final and was third reserve for the vault final. In the all-around final, Tinkler finished seventeenth after a fall on the uneven bars.

=== 2018 ===
Tinkler competed at the English Championships, where she won the all-around and medaled in every event. In February, Tinkler was named to the England team for the Commonwealth Games in the Gold Coast, alongside Georgia-Mae Fenton, Claudia Fragapane, Alice Kinsella and Kelly Simm. At the British Championships, Tinkler placed second in the all-around to Kelly Simm after a fall on the balance beam. She also placed second in the vault final and first in the floor final. Whilst warming up for the Birmingham World Cup, she tore ligaments in her ankle and withdrew from the competition. This injury caused her withdraw from the Commonwealth Games and was replaced by Taeja James.

=== 2019 ===
Tinkler did not compete due to injury.

=== 2020 ===
Tinkler announced her retirement from gymnastics in January 2020.

== Personal life ==
Tinkler is originally from Bishop Auckland, and lived there until moving to Essex after changing gyms. She attended Durham High School for Girls and took her GCSEs over three years to accommodate her gymnastics training.

On 26 January 2021, it was announced that Tinkler would be a contestant on the thirteenth series of Dancing on Ice, partnered with Joe Johnson. Tinkler made her debut in the competition in week 3, replacing Denise van Outen who was forced to withdraw from the show due to injury. She became the fourth celebrity to be eliminated in week 5.

Following her retirement from gymnastics, Tinkler took up cheerleading and competed at the 2022 World Cheerleading Championships with her team Coventry Dynamite.

== Competitive highlights ==
Year	Event	Team	AA	VT	UB	BB	FX
Espoir
2011	English Espoir Championships		1st place, gold medalist(s)		3rd place, bronze medalist(s)	3rd place, bronze medalist(s)	1st place, gold medalist(s)
2011	British Espoir Championships			1st place, gold medalist(s)	7	3rd place, bronze medalist(s)	
2011	UK School Games	2nd place, silver medalist(s)	9				3rd place, bronze medalist(s)
2012	British Espoir Championships		3rd place, bronze medalist(s)	2nd place, silver medalist(s)	3rd place, bronze medalist(s)	6	19
2012	UK School Games	1st place, gold medalist(s)	3rd place, bronze medalist(s)	3rd place, bronze medalist(s)	3rd place, bronze medalist(s)	6	2nd place, silver medalist(s)
Junior
2013	Australian Youth Olympic Festival	2nd place, silver medalist(s)		2nd place, silver medalist(s)			1st place, gold medalist(s)
2013	British Junior Championships		2nd place, silver medalist(s)	2nd place, silver medalist(s)	1st place, gold medalist(s)	3rd place, bronze medalist(s)	1st place, gold medalist(s)
2013	British Team Championships	5					
2013	European Youth Olympic Festival	2nd place, silver medalist(s)					6
2014	WOGA Classic	4	2nd place, silver medalist(s)	2nd place, silver medalist(s)			1st place, gold medalist(s)
2014	English Junior Championships		3rd place, bronze medalist(s)	3rd place, bronze medalist(s)	9	2nd place, silver medalist(s)	1st place, gold medalist(s)
2014	British Junior Championships		1st place, gold medalist(s)	2nd place, silver medalist(s)	4	3rd place, bronze medalist(s)	1st place, gold medalist(s)
2014	Munich Friendly	2nd place, silver medalist(s)	2nd place, silver medalist(s)				
2014	European Championships	2nd place, silver medalist(s)		3rd place, bronze medalist(s)			2nd place, silver medalist(s)
2014	Top Gym	2nd place, silver medalist(s)	10	3rd place, bronze medalist(s)	3rd place, bronze medalist(s)		2nd place, silver medalist(s)
Senior
2015	English Championships		1st place, gold medalist(s)		2nd place, silver medalist(s)	1st place, gold medalist(s)	3rd place, bronze medalist(s)
2015	British Championships		1st place, gold medalist(s)		4	5	1st place, gold medalist(s)
2015	European Championships						6
2015	British Team Championships	4					
2015	World Championships	3rd place, bronze medalist(s)	23				
2016	AT&T American Cup		4				
2016	English Championships		2nd place, silver medalist(s)	1st place, gold medalist(s)	3rd place, bronze medalist(s)	2nd place, silver medalist(s)	2nd place, silver medalist(s)
2016	British Championships		4		6		1st place, gold medalist(s)
2016	Olympic Games	5					3rd place, bronze medalist(s)
2017	American Cup		9				
2017	British Championships				4		
2017	London World Cup		3rd place, bronze medalist(s)				
2017	Szombathely Challenge Cup			DNF	4	6	3rd place, bronze medalist(s)
2017	World Championships		17	R3			
2018	English Championships		1st place, gold medalist(s)	1st place, gold medalist(s)	1st place, gold medalist(s)	3rd place, bronze medalist(s)	2nd place, silver medalist(s)
2018	British Championships		2nd place, silver medalist(s)	2nd place, silver medalist(s)	5		1st place, gold medalist(s)
