= Lisa Verschueren =

Belgian artistic gymnast (born 1995)

- Full name: Lisa Marie-Louise Verschueren
- Born: 14 June 1995 (age 31) Sint-Niklaas, Belgium

Gymnastics career
- Discipline: Women's artistic gymnastics
- Club: Sportiva Sint-Gillis-Waas
- Retired: 16 December 2015

Lisa Marie-Louise Verschueren (born 14 June 1995) is a retired Belgian artistic gymnast.

== Biography ==
In 2014, aged 18, she was crowned Belgian all-around champion in Mechelen, scoring 14.000 on vault, 13.800 on uneven bars, 12.633 on beam, and 12.766 on floor exercise, for an all-around score of 53.199.

In October of the same year she participated in the 2014 World Artistic Gymnastics Championships with Belgium, finishing eleventh. In June 2015 she and Gaelle Mys led Belgium to a silver in the first edition of the Flanders Team Challenge, won by Germany.

In 2015 she finished fourth on floor exercise at the 2015 European Games in Baku, missing the podium only narrowly.

In December 2015 she retired from artistic gymnastics due to a heart condition.

== Competitive history ==
Year	Event	Team	AA	VT	UB	BB	FX
2011	Ghent World Cup					20th	
2011	World Championships	16th	174th				
2012	Olympic Test Event	5th			57th	74th	83rd
2012	Ghent World Cup				10th	14th	
2012	Elite Gym Massilia	6th	20th				
2013	Anadia World Challenge Cup				19th	17th	
2013	World Championships		36th				
2014	International Gymnix		5th		2nd		
2014	Belgian Championships		1st				
2014	Beaumont en Veron	3rd	7th				
2014	European Championships	7th					
2014	Novara Cup	3rd	11th		8th		7th
2014	World Championships	11th	30th				
2015	Belgian Championships		3rd	1st	3rd		1st
2015	Flanders Team Challenge	2nd	7th				
2015	European Games	10th					4th
2015	BEL-SUI-AUS Friendly	1st	4th	2nd	2nd		3rd
2015	Novara Cup	3rd	6th				
2015	World Championships	11th	17th				
