= Catherine Lyons =

British gymnast (born 2000)

- Born: 30 August 2000 (age 26) United Kingdom

Gymnastics career
- Discipline: Women's artistic gymnastics
- Country represented: Great Britain; England (2013-2018)
- Gym: Europa
- Music: 2012: "Requim for a Tower" by Escala; 2013-2014: "Kissing You" by Des'ree; 2015: "Hello" by Evanescence
Medal record
Representing Great Britain
European Junior Championships
Gold medal – first place	2014 Sofia	Floor Exercise
Silver medal – second place	2014 Sofia	Team
Australian Youth Olympic Festival
Silver medal – second place	2013 Sydney	Team
British Junior Championships
Gold medal – first place	2014 Liverpool	Floor Exercise
Gold medal – first place	2015 Liverpool	All-Around
Gold medal – first place	2015 Liverpool	Vault
Gold medal – first place	2015 Liverpool	Balance Beam
Gold medal – first place	2015 Liverpool	Floor Exercise
Silver medal – second place	2014 Liverpool	Balance Beam
Silver medal – second place	2015 Liverpool	Uneven Bars
Bronze medal – third place	2014 Liverpool	All-Around
Bronze medal – third place	2014 Liverpool	Vault

Catherine Lyons (born 30 August 2000) is a retired British artistic gymnast. She has represented Great Britain numerous times in a prodigious junior career, most notably at the 2014 European Championships where she was crowned Junior European Floor Champion as well as taking home a silver with the team. Lyons retired from the sport in 2018, aged 17.

In 2020 Lyons, with fellow gymnast Lisa Mason went public with allegations of serious physical and mental abuse within the British Gymnastics system In response several elite and former elite gymnasts came forward, corroborating Lyons and Mason's allegations in their own careers, including European champions Becky Downie and Ellie Downie and Olympic medallist Amy Tinkler. Later that year, British Gymnastics CEO Jane Allen resigned from her role, although denied her resignation was linked to the Lyons and Mason interviews and their fallout.

== Junior career ==
=== 2014 ===
At the 2014 British Championships, Lyons took home all-around bronze as well as Floor gold and Beam silver. In May, Lyons competed at the 2014 European Women's Artistic Gymnastics Championships in Sofia, Bulgaria winning a silver with the team and a gold on the Floor.

=== 2015 ===
In March, Lyons competed at the English Championships in Loughborough. In the all-around competition she scored 14.450 on the vault, 12.200 on the uneven bars, 14.550 on the balance beam and 13.500 on the floor exercise finishing with a score of 54.700. Lyons' balance beam was over half a point higher than any senior gymnast in the English gymnast, the highest senior balance beam score was 13.900 posted by Olympic medallist Amy Tinkler, Lyons' all-around total would have been enough for the bronze medal if she were a senior.

Later in March, Lyons competed at the British Championships in Liverpool. Lyons had a solid performance in the all-around competition scoring 14.100 on the vault, 13.200 on the uneven bars, 14.100 on the balance beam and 14.200 on the floor exercise for a total score of 55.600 winning gold and 2.800 points better than the second place gymnast. Lyons medalled in every event final, winning gold in the vault final with an average score of 13.675, a silver in the uneven bars final with 13.600, another gold in the balance beam final after a positive routine and a solid score of 14.700 and another final gold medal in the floor exercise with 14.350 to finish off a positive meet at the championships.

=== 2018 ===
After struggles with injury during transition to the senior ranks, Lyons confirmed her retirement from the sport.

== Personal life ==
Lyons was born on 30 August 2000; making the age requirement for her school year by just two days. She attended St.Anthony's RC Primary School. She attended Kingsdale Foundation School, taking her GCSE exams in 2016.

== Competitive Highlights ==
Year	Event	Team	AA	VT	UB	BB	FX
2012	British Espoir Championships		1st	12th	18th	1st	1st
2012	UK School Games	1st	4th		9	1st	5th
2012	Coupe Avenir		3rd				
2013	Australian Youth Olympic Festival	2nd				4th	4th
2013	UK School Games	1st	1st	1st	1st	1st	1st
2013	Japan Junior International		8th		6th	4th	7th
2013	British Espoir Championships		1st	1st	1st	1st	1st
2014	English Junior Championships		2nd	4th	8th	1st	1st
2014	British Junior Championships		3rd	3rd		2nd	1st
2014	Munich Friendly	2nd	15th				
2014	European Junior Championships	2nd	4th			5th	1st
2015	Welsh Open		1st	2nd	1st	1st	1st
2015	English Junior Championships		1st	1st	6th	1st	1st
2015	British Junior Championships		1st	1st	2nd	1st	1st
