= Tabea Alt =

German artistic gymnast (born 2000)

- Full name: Tabea Lara Alt
- Born: 18 March 2000 (age 26) Baden-Wurttemburg, Germany
- Height: 1.58 m (5 ft 2 in)

Gymnastics career
- Discipline: Women's artistic gymnastics
- Country represented: Germany; (2016)
Medal record
Representing Germany
World Championships
Bronze medal – third place	2017 Montreal	Balance Beam
FIG World Cup
Event / 1st / 2nd / 3rd; All-Around World Cup / 2 / 0 / 0

Tabea Lara Alt (born 18 March 2000) is a former German elite artistic gymnast. She is the 2017 World bronze medalist on balance beam, and a 2016 Olympian. She competed at the 2016 Gymnastics Olympic Test Event, contributing to the team placing of second, which qualified the German team for the 2016 Summer Olympics. At the 2016 Summer Olympics, the German team finished 6th in the team all-around competition.

== Career ==
=== 2016 ===
At the 2016 American Cup, Alt finished seventh in the all-around with a score of 54.399. She competed at the 2016 Gymnastics Olympic Test Event in April. There she helped her team qualify for the 2016 Summer Olympics with a team finish of second place. Individually, she was third in the all-around. At the 2016 Rio Summer Olympics, the German team finished 6th in the team all-around competition. Alt did not qualify for any of the event finals.

=== 2017 ===
Alt won the 2017 Stuttgart World Cup in March 2017, beating Angelina Melnikova and Morgan Hurd. Alt would also go on to win the 2017 London World Cup in April, placing ahead of Angelina Melnikova, Victoria Nguyen and Amy Tinkler. At the 2017 European Championships, she finished ninth on balance beam (10.966) after qualifying in fifth place (13.700).

In the 2017 World Gymnastics Championships in Montreal, Canada, Alt qualified first into the balance beam final, and won the bronze medal with the score 13.300, behind her teammate Pauline Schäfer and Morgan Hurd from the USA.

In December 2017, the Alt and the Alt II were added to the Code of Points. Alt debuted both uneven bars elements at the 2017 World Championships.

=== 2018 ===
In October 2018, Alt had surgery on a persistent shoulder injury.

=== 2021 ===
Alt retired in 2021 at age 21 due to injuries. In 2024, she came forward with allegations that her training environment in Stuttgart had been abusive and that she had competed with fractures during her career. She said that in 2021, she had sent a letter to her trainers and the president of the German Gymnastics Federation, among others, detailing the issues that occurred, but she felt that it had been ignored. The German Gymnastics Federation responded to her allegations by saying they would launch an investigation with external help.

== Eponymous skills ==
Alt has two uneven bars skills named after her in the Code of Points.

Apparatus	Name	Description	Difficulty (Note: Valid for the 2025–2028 Code of Points)	Added to the Code of Points
Uneven bars	Alt	Stoop trough on high bar, dislocate and release with ½ (180°) turn in flight between the bars to catch low bar in hang	C (0.3)	2017 World Championships
Uneven bars	Alt II	Clear straddle circle with salto forward tucked with ½ turn (180°)	C (0.3)	2017 World Championships
