= Asiana Peng =

Romanian artistic gymnast

- Full name: Asiana Lidia Peng
- Born: 21 January 2000 (age 26) Deva, Romania

Gymnastics career
- Country represented: Romania
- Club: CNS Cetate Deva
- Head coaches: Cristinel Micu, Gina Gogean, Luciana Rusan Menciu, Lenuța Slabu, Ioan Coroiu
- Former coach: Adela Popa

Asiana Peng (born January 21, 2000, in Deva) is a former elite Romanian gymnast. Her mother is Romanian and her father is Chinese. She trains at CNS Cetate Deva, and is coached by former World and European Champion Gina Gogean.

== Early life ==
In 2009, a Romanian magazine reported that Peng and her parents were threatening to take her to Europe or China to be trained because the Deva school couldn't provide her with a scholarship for her tuition, training and board at the school. Her mother, who is unemployed, claimed she could not afford the monthly 320 lei and was planning to take her from the school to another country who will give her a scholarship. Deva director Adrian Liga called the threat emotional blackmail, and claimed that the school was powerless financially to help. The matter has since been resolved.

== Career ==
=== 2009-2011 ===
Peng competed at the Romanian School Nationals, winning balance beam gold, team and uneven bars silver, and placed eighth in the all-around. She won another team silver at the Romanian "Little Girls" Nationals, and placed fourth on bars, fifth on beam, and ninth in the all-around.

Peng made her international debut at the Alden Adria Cup in Austria, winning bronze in the all-around. She also swept the DKMT Cup, and won floor exercise gold, all-around silver, vault and uneven bars bronze, and placed fifth on balance beam at the Krstic & Dzelatovic Memorial.

Peng competed at the Romanian School Nationals, winning vault silver and all-around, uneven bars, and floor exercise bronze, and went on to win all-around bronze at the Alden Adria Cup.

=== 2012 ===
Peng competed at the Romanian School Nationals, winning team gold, all-around silver, vault and balance beam bronze, and placing fifth on bars and sixth on floor. At the Romanian Junior Individual Nationals, she won all-around, uneven bars, and floor exercise gold and vault and balance beam silver medals. At the Romanian Nationals in November, she helped her team place first in the team final, and won a bronze medal on floor exercise.

=== 2013 ===
That year, Peng competed at the Nadia Comaneci Invitational, placing fifth in the all-around and eighth with her team. Later that year, she competed at the Romanian Nationals in September, placing fourth with her team, sixth on bars, and ninth in the all-around. She went on to compete at the Romanian Junior Nationals in October, winning silver on floor, and placing fifth in the all-around, sixth on beam, and eighth on bars.

=== 2014 ===
In early March, she was named to the Romanian team for the City of Jesolo Trophy. She won silver with the Romanian team, but didn't have her best day individually, and placed twenty-second in the all-around. In April, she competed at a friendly meet against gymnasts from Belgium and France, winning team gold and placing eighth in the all-around.

In August, she competed at the Romanian Nationals, placing fifth on beam. In November, she competed at the Coupe Avenir, winning team, balance beam, and floor exercise gold, and placing fifth in the all-around.

Peng becomes a senior gymnast in 2016, just in time for the Olympics in Rio de Janeiro.
