= Andreea Iridon =

Romanian artistic gymnast

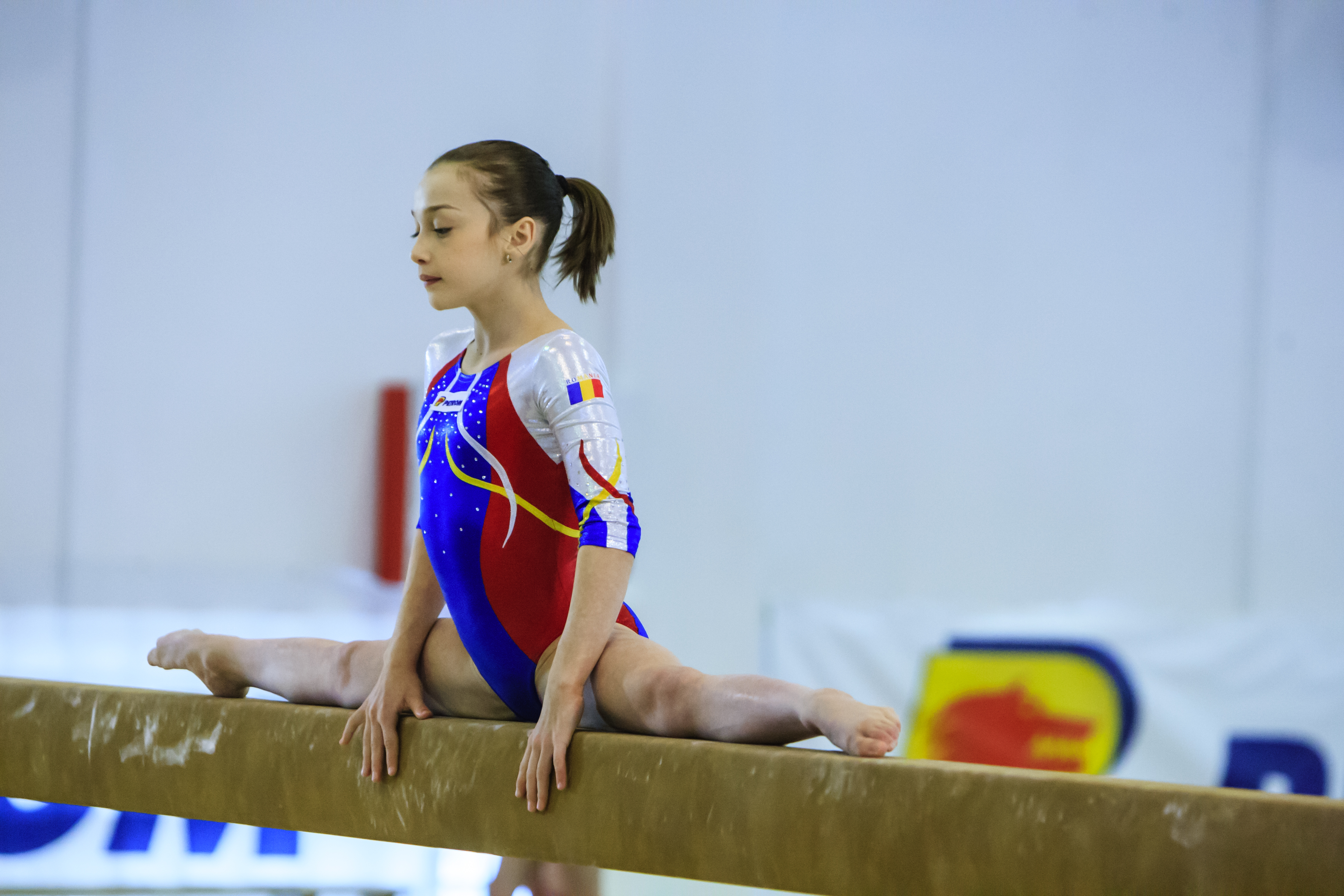
- Iridon in 2015

Personal information
- Full name: Andreea Maria Iridon
- Born: 23 November 1999 (age 26) Tilișca, Sibiu County, Romania

Gymnastics career
- Discipline: Women's artistic gymnastics
- Country represented: Romania (2013–2016)
- Club: CNS Cetate Deva
- Head coaches: Octavian Bellu and Mariana Bitang
- Assistant coaches: Lacramioara and Cristian Moldovan
- Former coaches: Adela Popa, Alex Militaru and Ioan Coroiu
- Music: 2013: Amvaj (Instrumental-violin) – Bijan Mortazavi
- Retired: 2016
Medal record
Representing Romania
European Games
Silver medal – second place	2015 Baku	Balance beam
Bronze medal – third place	2015 Baku	Uneven bars

Andreea Maria Iridon (born 23 November 1999) is a Romanian former artistic gymnast. She won a silver medal on the balance beam and a bronze medal on the uneven bars at the 2015 European Games. At the 2014 Junior European Championships, Iridon won silver medals on the balance beam and floor exercise, and a bronze medal with the team.

== Personal life ==
Iridon's family lived in Tilişca, but she trained in Deva, Romania.

== Junior gymnastics career ==
=== 2013 ===
Iridon's international debut was at a friendly meet with Germany and the United States. She placed third with the Romanian team and tenth in the all-around.

In July, Iridon competed at the 2013 European Youth Summer Olympic Festival with teammates Laura Jurca and Silvia Zarzu, and they won a bronze medal. Individually, she tied with Claire Martin of France for the bronze on beam. She finished fourth on floor, just 0.1 behind her teammate Silvia Zarzu. At the Japan Junior International, Iridon won a silver medal on bars behind Bailie Key.

At the Romanian National Championships, she won a bronze in the all-around behind Larisa Iordache and Andreea Munteanu. She won a bronze on uneven bars, and she finished sixth on balance beam. At the Japan Junior International, Iridon won a silver medal on bars behind Bailie Key. In October, she competed at the Romanian Junior National Championships, she won gold on bars and beam but finished twentieth in the all-around.

=== 2014 ===
Iridon competed at the City of Jesolo Trophy where she won a silver medal with the Romanian team by contributing on bars and beam. She won the bronze medal on beam with a 14.300. She competed in the France-Romania-Belgium Tri-Friendly meet where she won team and all-around gold.

In May, Irdion competed at the European Championships. She contributed scores on all events towards Romania's bronze medal finish. In the all-around final, she finished 6th with a total of 53.933. She won a silver medal in the balance beam final behind Angelina Melnikova with a score of 14.433. She tied for the silver medal in the floor final with British gymnast Amy Tinkler.

At the Romanian National Championships, Iridon won a bronze medal in the all-around behind Larisa Iordache and Ștefania Stănilă. She won a silver on the uneven bars behind Larisa Iordache, and she finished third on beam behind Andreea Munteanu and Larisa Iordache.

== Senior gymnastics career ==
=== 2015 ===
Andreea competed at Trofeo Torino 4 Nazioni where she placed 3rd with the Romanian team after Russia and Italy. In June she was selected to compete at the 2015 European Games and helped Romanian team finish in 7th place. She placed 3rd on uneven bars with 12.800 after she fell and 2nd on balance beam with 14.000, behind Lieke Wevers. She also qualified in the all-around final, but was replaced by Laura Jurca.

=== 2016 ===
Iridon's final competition was the Belgium Friendly where the Romanian team finished second to Belgium. Andreea Iridon announced her retirement following Romania's failure to qualify a full team to the 2016 Olympic Games.

== Competitive history ==
Competitive history of Andreea Iridon
Year	Event	Team	AA	VT	UB	BB	FX
2013	GER-ROU-USA Friendly	3rd place, bronze medalist(s)	10				
2013	France-Romania Junior Friendly	1st place, gold medalist(s)	3rd place, bronze medalist(s)		1st place, gold medalist(s)	2nd place, silver medalist(s)	2nd place, silver medalist(s)
2013	European Youth Olympic Festival	3rd place, bronze medalist(s)				3rd place, bronze medalist(s)	4
2013	Romanian Championships	1st place, gold medalist(s)	3rd place, bronze medalist(s)		3rd place, bronze medalist(s)	6	
2013	Japan Junior International		15		2nd place, silver medalist(s)		
2013	Romanian Junior Championships		20		1st place, gold medalist(s)	1st place, gold medalist(s)	
2014	City of Jesolo Trophy	2nd place, silver medalist(s)				3rd place, bronze medalist(s)	
2014	BEL-FRA-ROU Friendly	1st place, gold medalist(s)	1st place, gold medalist(s)				
2014	Junior European Championships	3rd place, bronze medalist(s)	6			2nd place, silver medalist(s)	2nd place, silver medalist(s)
2014	Romanian Championships		3rd place, bronze medalist(s)		2nd place, silver medalist(s)	3rd place, bronze medalist(s)	5
2015	Trofeo Torino 4 Nazioni	3rd place, bronze medalist(s)					
2015	European Games	7			3rd place, bronze medalist(s)	2nd place, silver medalist(s)	
2015	Romanian Championships	2nd place, silver medalist(s)			6		
2015	Novara Cup	1st place, gold medalist(s)					
2016	Belgium-Romania-Germany Friendly	2nd place, silver medalist(s)					
