= Laura Jurca =

Romanian artistic gymnast

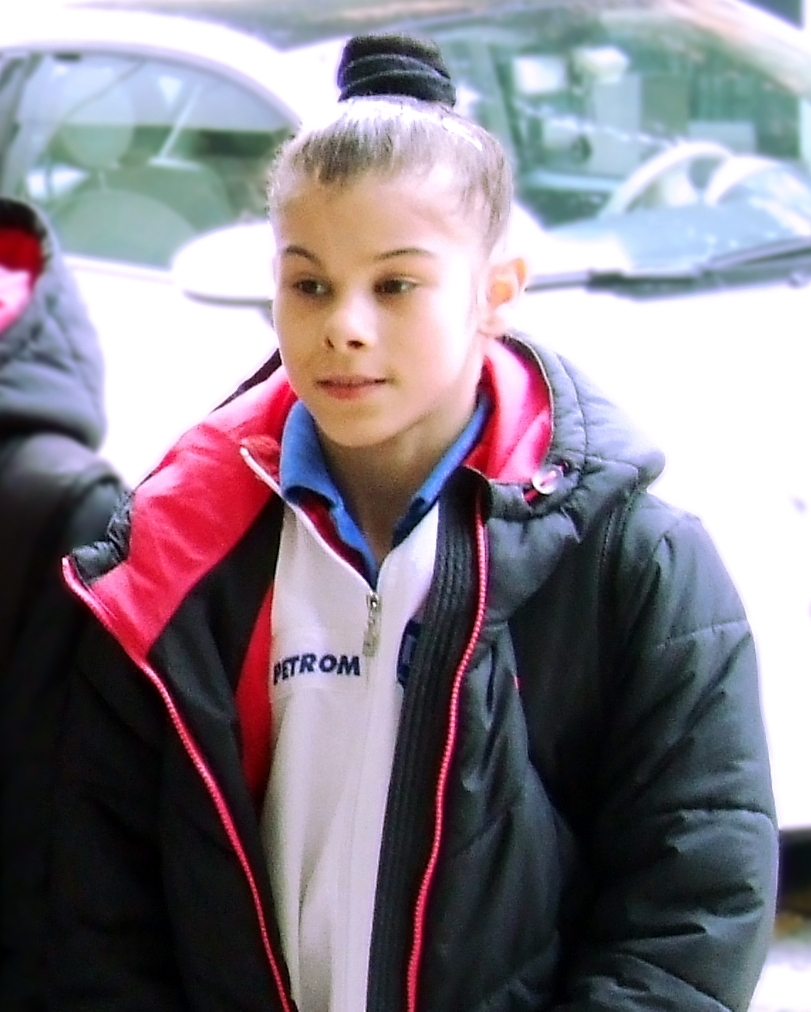
- Laura Jurca at the 2014 City of Jesolo Trophy

Personal information
- Born: 14 September 1999 (age 26) Munich, Germany

Gymnastics career
- Discipline: Women's artistic gymnastics
- Country represented: Romania (2012–2017, 2023–present)
- Club: CNS Cetate Deva, STV Lenzburg
- Head coach: Ioan Coroiu
- Assistant coach: Adela Popa
- Former coach: Ulpia Barbu
Medal record
Representing Romania
FIG World Cup
| Event | 1st | 2nd | 3rd |
|---|---|---|---|
| World Challenge Cup | 0 | 1 | 0 |

Laura Jurca (born 14 September 1999, in Munich) is a Romanian artistic gymnast and a member of Romania's women's artistic gymnastics team. She is the 2014 European junior all-around silver medalist. She also represented Romania at the 2014 Youth Olympic Games.

== Junior career ==
=== 2012 ===
Jurca competed at the Trnava Gym Festival and placed first with the Romanian team. A few months later she placed fourth on vault and seventh on vault at Romanian Nationals.

=== 2013 ===
Jurca debuted internationally at the International Gymnix where she placed seventh with the Romanian junior team. A few months later she competed in a friendly meet against France, winning the gold medal with her team and the bronze in the vault, and additionally she placed fifth on floor and eighth in the all-around. In July, she was selected, along Silvia Zarzu and Andreea Iridon, to represent Romania at the European Youth Olympic Festival, held in Utrecht, Nederlands. There, Laura had a good meet, placing 3rd with her team and second on vault. She also qualified to the balance beam and all-around final, placing sixth and seventh respectively. In September she tied for first on vault and with her team at Romanian Nationals.

=== 2014 ===
In March, Jurca traveled to Italy to represent her country at the 2014 City of Jesolo Trophy. She placed second with her team and won the silver medal on floor and bronze on vault. She also placed fourth in the all-around, fifth on beam and eight on bars. In April, she competed at a tri-meet against France and Belgium as a preparation for the European Championships. She won gold with the Romanian team and bronze in the all-around. In May she was selected to compete at the 2014 Junior European Gymnastics Championships in Sofia, Bulgaria. She won bronze with the team, behind Russia and Great Britain and individually placed 2nd in the all-around and on vault and placed fifth on floor. In August, she was chosen to represent her country at the Youth Olympic Games held in Nanjing, China. While she qualified to all event finals, she left Nanjing empty handed. She was one of the favorites for an all-around medal, but mistakes on floor kept her out of the podium and finished 7th. In the vault final, she performed a full twisting yurchenko and a double twisting yurchenko, and while they were well-executed, she didn't have enough difficulty to challenge for a medal, so she finished 4th. In the bars final, she fell on her gienger release and finished 7th. In the beam final she fell on her layout step-out series, finishing last. In the floor final she finished 0.1 away from the bronze medal, which went to Great Britain's Ellie Downie.

== Senior career ==
=== 2015 ===
Laura competed at the Doha World Cup where she placed 4th on balance beam and uneven bars and 2nd on floor. She placed 7th in the all-around at the 2015 European Artistic Gymnastics Championships. In May, she also competed at Trofeo Torino 4 Nazioni where she placed 7th in the all-around and 3rd with the Romanian team. In June, she was selected to compete at the 2015 European Games, where she placed 7th with the team and 9th in the all-around after replacing Andreea Iridon. In September she competed at the friendly meet between Romania and France and helped the Romanian team finish in 1st place. Individually she placed 5th in the all-around.

== Competitive history ==
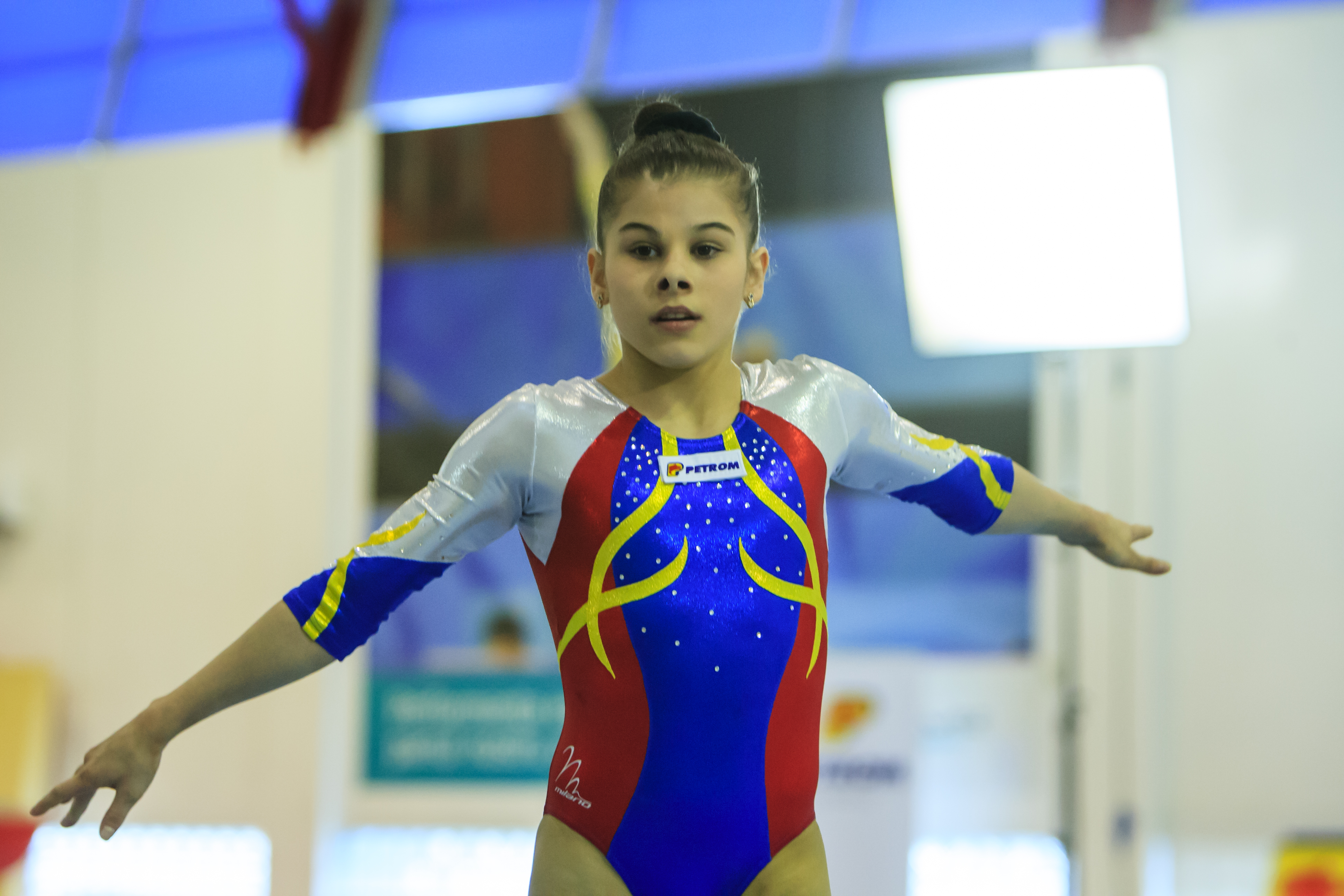
Laura Jurca in 2015.

| Year | Event | Team | AA | VT | UB | BB | FX |
Junior
| 2012 | Gym Festival Trnava | 1st place, gold medalist(s) | | | | | |
| 2012 | National Championships | | | 4 | | | 7 |
| 2013 | International Gymnix | 7 | | | | | |
| 2013 | France-Romania Junior Friendly | 1st place, gold medalist(s) | 8 | 3rd place, bronze medalist(s) | | | 5 |
| 2013 | European Youth Olympic Festival | 3rd place, bronze medalist(s) | 7 | 2nd place, silver medalist(s) | | 6 | |
| 2013 | National Championships | 1st place, gold medalist(s) | 6 | 1st place, gold medalist(s) | 4 | | |
| 2014 | City of Jesolo Trophy | 2nd place, silver medalist(s) | 4 | 3rd place, bronze medalist(s) | 8 | 5 | 2nd place, silver medalist(s) |
| 2014 | BEL-FRA-ROU Friendly | 1st place, gold medalist(s) | 3rd place, bronze medalist(s) | | | | |
| 2014 | Junior European Championships | 3rd place, bronze medalist(s) | 2nd place, silver medalist(s) | 2nd place, silver medalist(s) | | | 5 |
| 2014 | Youth Olympic Games | | 7 | 4 | 7 | 8 | 4 |
Senior
| 2015 | Doha Challenge Cup | | | | 4 | 4 | 2nd place, silver medalist(s) |
| 2015 | European Championships | | 7 | | | | |
| 2015 | Trofeo Torino 4 Nazioni | 3rd place, bronze medalist(s) | 7 | | | | |
| 2015 | European Games | 7 | 9 | | | | |
| 2015 | FRA-ROU Friendly | 1st place, gold medalist(s) | 5 | | | | |
| 2015 | National Championships | 2nd place, silver medalist(s) | | | 2nd place, silver medalist(s) | | 3rd place, bronze medalist(s) |
| 2015 | Novara Cup | 1st place, gold medalist(s) | 8 | | | | |
| 2015 | World Championships | | 8 | | | | |
| 2015 | Elite Gym Massilia | 3rd place, bronze medalist(s) | 8 | 1st place, gold medalist(s) | | 1st place, gold medalist(s) | |
| 2016 | Bundesliga Semifinals | 1st place, gold medalist(s) | | | | | |
| 2017 | First Bundesliga | 2nd place, silver medalist(s) | | | | | |
| 2017 | National Championships | 1st place, gold medalist(s) | | 5 | 5 | | |
| 2017 | Szombathely Challenge Cup | | | | 6 | | |
