= Ștefania Stănilă =

Romanian artistic gymnast (born 1997)

- Full name: Alina Ștefania Stănilă
- Nickname: Ștefi
- Born: 27 December 1997 (age 28) Aninoasa, Hunedoara County, Romania

Gymnastics career
- Discipline: Women's artistic gymnastics
- Country represented: Romania
- Club: CNS Cetate Deva
- Head coaches: Gheorghe Orban, Lacramioara Moldovan and Cristian Moldovan
- Retired: 2014
Medal record
European Championships
Gold medal – first place	2014 Sofia	Team

Alina Ștefania Stănilă (born 27 December 1997) is a retired Romanian artistic gymnast. She was part of the Romanian team that won the gold medal in the team event at the 2014 European Championships.

== Career ==
=== Junior ===
Stănilă competed at the 2012 City of Jesolo Trophy and placed 4th with the team and 11th in the all-around. She competed at the 2012 Junior European Championships alongside Andreea Munteanu, Miriam Aribășoiu, Silvia Zarzu and Paula Tudorache, and they won the team bronze medal. Individually, Stănilă won the silver medal on the vault behind Chantysha Netteb and placed 12th in the all-around.

=== Senior ===
Stănilă was added to the Romanian team for the 2013 World Championships after Diana Bulimar withdrew due to a knee injury. She competed on the balance beam and the floor exercise, but she did not qualify for any event finals.

At the 2014 City of Jesolo Trophy, Stănilă placed 14th in the all-around and 5th on the floor exercise. She competed in a friendly meet between Belgium, France, and Romania and helped the Romanian team win the gold medal. Individually, she won the bronze medal in the all-around and on the floor exercise. both behind Larisa Iordache and Diana Bulimar. She competed at the 2014 European Championships alongside Iordache, Bulimar, Andreea Munteanu, and Silvia Zarzu, and they won the team gold medal. In August, at the National Championships, she won the silver medal in the all-around behind Iordache and the bronze medal on the vault and on the floor exercise. She competed at the 2014 World Championships with Larisa Iordache, Silvia Zarzu, Andreea Munteanu, Anamaria Ocolișan, and Paula Tudorache, and they placed 4th in the team final. She placed 19th in the all-around final with a total score of 53.533. Stănilă retired after the World Championships.

== Competitive history ==
Year	Event	Team	AA	VT	UB	BB	FX
2011	Nadia Comaneci Invitational		5				
2012	City of Jesolo Trophy	4	11				
2012	FRA-ROU Friendly	1st place, gold medalist(s)	1st place, gold medalist(s)				
2012	Junior European Championships	3rd place, bronze medalist(s)		2nd place, silver medalist(s)			
2012	National Championships	1st place, gold medalist(s)	4	1st place, gold medalist(s)	1st place, gold medalist(s)	3rd place, bronze medalist(s)	
2013	National Championships	1st place, gold medalist(s)	5	4	8	8	5
2013	Élite Gym Massilia	1st place, gold medalist(s)					
2014	City of Jesolo Trophy		14				5
2014	BEL-FRA-ROU Friendly	1st place, gold medalist(s)	3rd place, bronze medalist(s)				
2014	European Championships	1st place, gold medalist(s)					
2014	National Championships		2nd place, silver medalist(s)	3rd place, bronze medalist(s)		8	3rd place, bronze medalist(s)
2014	SUI-GER-ROU Friendly	2nd place, silver medalist(s)	5	10	9	6	4
2014	World Championships	4	19				
