= Paula Tudorache =

Romanian artistic gymnast

- Full name: Cristina Paula Tudorache
- Born: 23 December 1998 (age 27) Bucharest

Gymnastics career
- Discipline: Women's artistic gymnastics
- Country represented: Romania (2011 - 2015)
- Club: CS Dinamo Bucharest
- Head coaches: Anca Draghici, Adriana Musat, Dan Potra, Valentin Frunzac
- Retired: 2016

Cristina Paula Tudorache (born 23 December 1998 in Bucharest) is a retired Romanian artistic gymnast. She competed at the 2014 World Championships.

== Career ==
=== Junior ===
Tudorache competed at the 2012 City of Jesolo Trophy, and the Romanian team placed 4th. She competed at the 2012 Junior European Championships alongside Andreea Munteanu, Miriam Aribășoiu, Silvia Zarzu and Ștefania Stănilă, and they won the team bronze medal. At the 2013 International Gymnix, she finished 11th in the all-around, 6th on the uneven bars, and 5th on the balance beam. At the Chemnitz Friendly, the Romanian team won the bronze medal behind the United States and Germany, and Tudorache won the bronze medal on the balance beam behind Bailie Key and Andreea Munteanu.

=== Senior ===
At the 2014 National Championships, Tudorache placed 4th on the balance beam and uneven bars and 6th in the all-around and on the floor exercise. At the friendly meet against Germany and Switzerland, the Romanian team finished 2nd behind Germany. She competed at the 2014 World Championships with Larisa Iordache, Silvia Zarzu, Andreea Munteanu, Anamaria Ocolișan, and Ștefania Stănilă, and they placed 4th in the team final. Tudorache was removed from the senior national team at the end of 2015, and she retired in 2016.
