= Silvia Zarzu =

Romania artistic gymnast

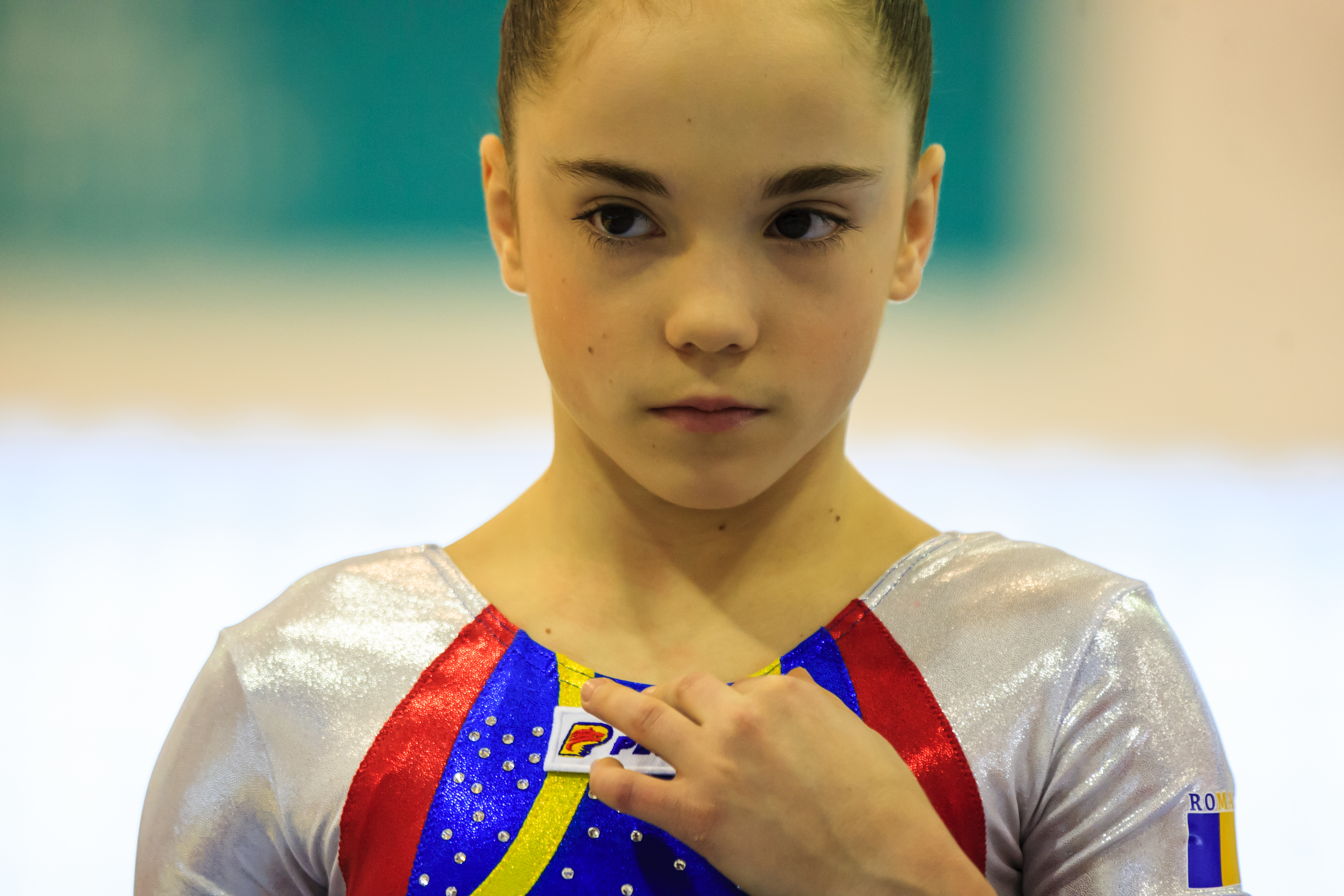

Personal information
- Full name: Silvia Andreea Zarzu
- Born: 16 December 1998 (age 27) Onești, Bacău County, Romania

Gymnastics career
- Discipline: Women's artistic gymnastics
- Country represented: Romania
- Club: CSM Onesti
- Retired: 2016
Medal record
Representing Romania
European Championships
Gold medal – first place	2014 Sofia	Team

Silvia Andreea Zarzu (born 16 December 1998) is a retired Romanian artistic gymnast. She was part of the Romanian team that won the gold medal in the team event at the 2014 European Championships and placed fourth at the 2014 World Championships.

== Junior career ==
Zarzu competed with Andreea Munteanu, Miriam Aribășoiu, Ștefania Stănilă, and Paula Tudorache at the 2012 European Junior Championships, and they won the bronze medal. Individually, Zarzu won the silver medal on the floor exercise behind Maria Kharenkova from Russia. She competed with Andreea Iridon and Laura Jurca at the 2013 European Youth Summer Olympic Festival, and they won the team bronze medal behind Russia and Great Britain. Zarzu won the bronze medal on the floor exercise behind Kharenkova and Kim Janas.

== Senior career ==
=== 2014 ===
Zarzu competed in a friendly meet between Belgium, France, and Romania and helped the Romanian team win the gold medal. She competed at the 2014 European Championships alongside Larisa Iordache, Diana Bulimar, Andreea Munteanu, and Ștefania Stănilă, and they won the team gold medal. In August, at the National Championships, Zarzu placed 13th in the all-around, 6th on vault, and 4th on floor. She competed at the 2014 World Championships with Larisa Iordache, Ștefania Stănilă, Andreea Munteanu, Anamaria Ocolișan, and Paula Tudorache, and they placed 4th in the team final.

=== 2015 ===
In May, Zarzu competed at Four Nations Trophy and helped the Romanian team place 3rd after Russia and Italy. She represented Romania at the 2015 European Games with Andreea Iridon and Laura Jurca, and they placed 7th in the team competition. Individually, Zarzu finished 5th in the floor exercise event final. In September, she competed at a friendly meet between Romania and France and helped the team win the gold medal. She won the silver medal on the floor exercise at the National Championships behind Larisa Irodache, and she finished 4th in the all-around.

Zarzu was selected to compete at the 2015 World Championships along with Diana Bulimar, Ana Maria Ocolişan, Laura Jurca, Larisa Iordache, and Catalina Ponor. However, Ponor withdrew after having surgery, and alternate Andreea Iridon was put in. On the day before the qualification round, Ocolisan injured her ankle and could not compete. The Romanian team finished in thirteenth place, meaning that they did not directly qualify for the 2016 Olympics and had to compete at the Test Event.

=== 2016 ===
Zarzu competed at the 2016 Olympic Test Event with Diana Bulimar, Maria Holbură, Anamaria Ocolișan, Cătălina Ponor, and Dora Vulcan, but the team finished 7th, meaning they did not qualify for the 2016 Olympic Games. She then competed with Anda Butuc, Ocolișan, Ponor, and Holbură at the 2016 European Championships where they finished 6th in the team final. In July, she placed seventh on uneven bars at the National Championships.

== Competitive history ==
Year	Event	TF	AA	VT	UB	BB	FX
2011	ITA-FIN-GER-ROU Junior Friendly	2nd					
2012
2012	Junior European Championships	3rd					2nd
2012	FRA-ROU Friendly	1st					
2013	France-Romania Junior Friendly	1st	4th	6th			3rd
2013	European Youth Olympic Festival	3rd					3rd
2013	National Championships	5th		5th			6th
2013	Junior National Championships		9th				
2014	BEL-FRA-ROU Friendly	1st					
2014	European Championships	1st					
2014	National Championships		13th	6th			4th
2014	SUI-GER-ROU Friendly	2nd		8th			7th
2014	World Championships	4th					
2015	Trofeo Torino 4 Nazioni	3rd					
2015	European Games	7th					5th
2015	FRA-ROU Friendly	1st					
2015	National Championships		4th			6th	2nd
2015	Novara Cup	1st					
2016	Belgium-Romania-Germany Friendly	2nd					
2016	Olympic Test Event	7th					
2016	European Championships	6th					
2016	National Championships				7th		
