= Andreea Munteanu =

Romanian artistic gymnast

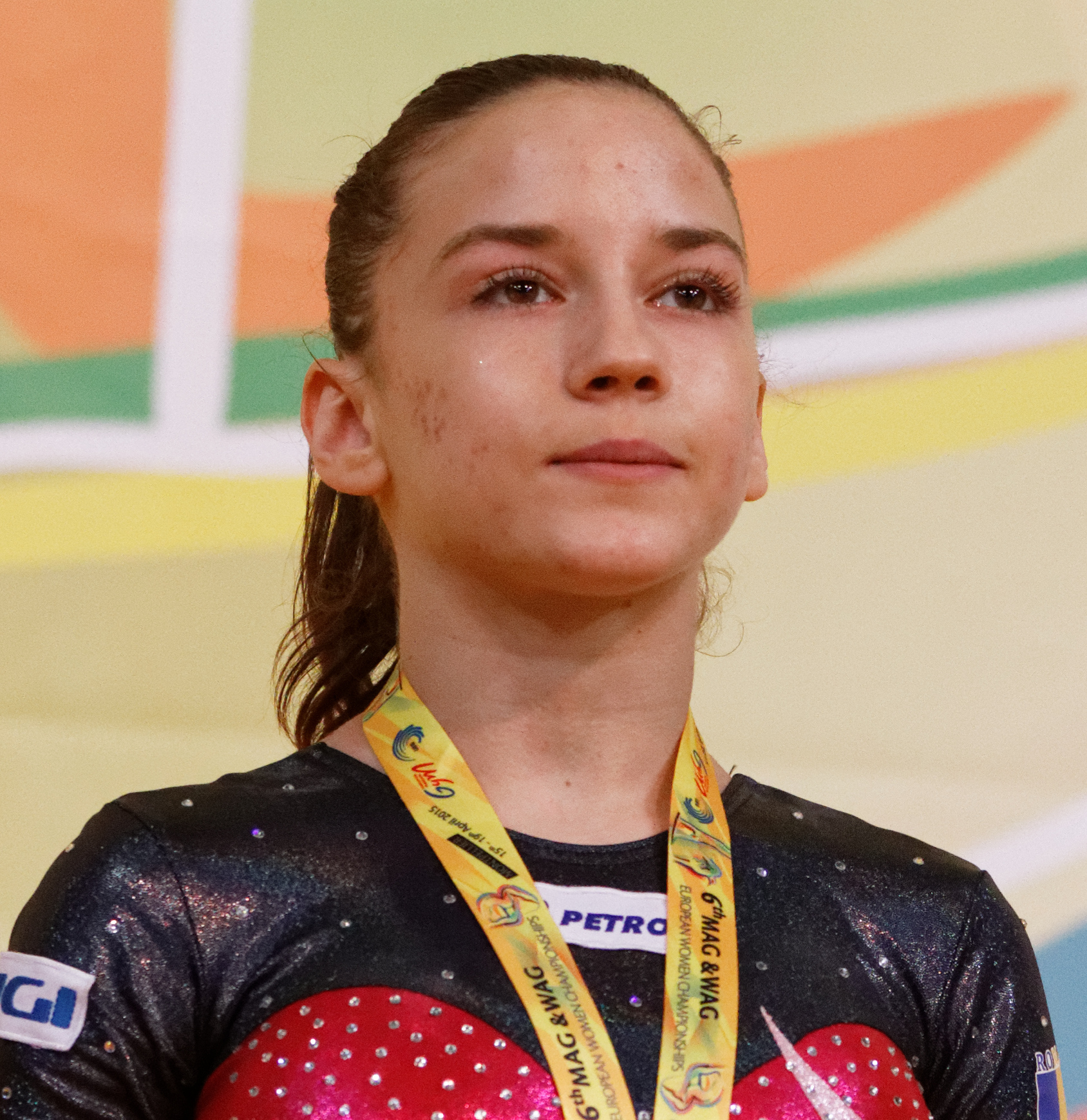
- Munteanu at the 2015 European Championships

Personal information
- Full name: Andreea Eugenia Munteanu
- Born: 29 May 1998 (age 28) Bustuchin, Gorj County, Romania

Gymnastics career
- Discipline: Women's artistic gymnastics
- Country represented: Romania (2010-2015 (ROU))
- Club: CNS Cetate Deva
- Head coach: Octavian Bellu
- Assistant coach: Mariana Bitang
- Retired: 2016
Medal record
Representing Romania
European Championships
Gold medal – first place	2014 Sofia	Team
Gold medal – first place	2015 Montpellier	Balance beam
FIG World Cup
Event	1st	2nd	3rd
World Challenge Cup	1	1	1
Total	1	1	1

Andreea Eugenia Munteanu (Romanian pronunciation: [anˈdree̯a e.uˈdʒeni.a munˈte̯anu]; born 29 May 1998) is a Romanian retired artistic gymnast. She is a two-time European champion, with a team title in 2014 and a balance beam gold in 2015. She competed at the 2014 World Championships.

== Career ==
Munteanu began gymnastics when she was five years old.

=== Junior ===
==== 2012 ====
Munteanu was named to the Romanian junior team for the Junior European Championships in Brussels alongside Miriam Aribășoiu, Ștefania Stănilă, Silvia Zarzu, and Paula Tudorache. She helped the Romanian team finish in third place behind Russia and Italy. She also took home three individual medals: bronze in the all-around with a score of 54.857, silver on the balance beam behind Maria Kharenkova, and bronze on the floor exercise, tied with Gabrielle Jupp of Great Britain).

==== 2013 ====
Munteanu began the season at the International Gymnix in Montreal and finished fourth in the all-around. In the vault final, she won the bronze medal behind Canadians Shallon Olsen and Aleeza Yu. She then won gold medals on both the balance beam and floor exercise. Then at the Chemnitz Friendly, she helped the Romanian team finish third behind the United States and Germany, and she won the silver medal in the all-around behind American Bailie Key. Then at the Lugano Trophy, she won the gold medal in the all-around with the highest score on each event except for the uneven bars where she scored below Maria Bondareva. She then helped Romania win a friendly meet against France by winning the all-around and every event except for uneven bars. At the Junior Japan International, she finished fifth in the all-around and won the silver medals on the balance beam and floor exercise, both behind Bailie Key. Her final competition of the season was the Élite Gym Massilia where the Romanian team of Larisa Iordache, Ștefania Stănilă, and Anamaria Ocolișan won the gold medal. Individually, she won the silver medal in the all-around, balance beam, and floor exercise, all behind Iordache.

=== Senior ===
==== 2014 ====
Munteanu's senior debut came at the Cottbus World Challenge Cup in March. She won a bronze medal on the balance beam behind Noémi Makra and Maria Kharenkova, and she finished fifth on the floor exercise. She competed at the City of Jesolo Trophy and won gold on the balance beam with a score of 14.833 and bronze on the floor exercise with a score of 13.967, and she placed thirteenth in the all-around (54.500). In April, she competed at the Beaumont en Véron friendly meet against gymnasts from Belgium and France, winning team gold and placing sixth in the all-around. She was selected to compete at the European Championships in Sofia, Bulgaria alongside Larisa Iordache, Diana Bulimar, Ștefania Stănilă, and Silvia Zarzu, and the team won the gold medal. She only competed on the balance beam and floor exercise at the Romanian Championships. She won the balance beam title with a score of 15.325, and she won the silver medal on the floor exercise behind Larisa Iordache. Then at the Länderkampf Kunstturnen, a friendly meet against Germany and Switzerland, the Romanian team finished second behind Germany, and Munteanu won the silver medal on the balance beam behind Iordache. She was then selected to compete at the 2014 World Championships alongside Iordache, Ștefania Stănilă, Anamaria Ocolișan, Paula Tudorache, and Silvia Zarzu. She competed on the balance beam and floor exercise during the team finals where Romania finished fourth.

==== 2015 ====
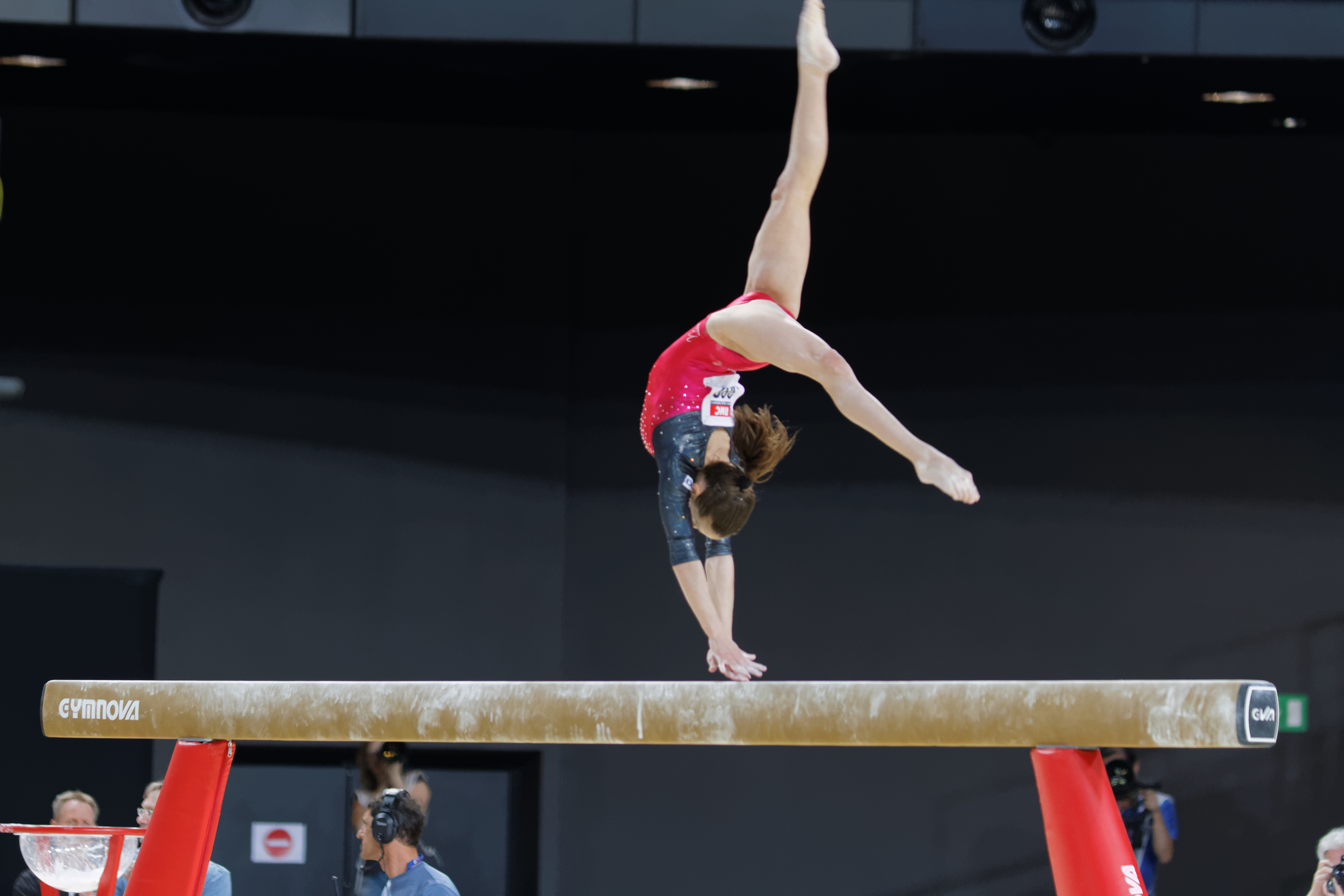
Munteanu on the balance beam at the 2015 European Championships

Munteanu once again used the Cottbus World Cup as her first meet of the season. She won gold on the balance beam and silver on the floor exercise behind Poland's Marta Pihan-Kulesza. She was originally the alternate for the European Championships, but she was selected to compete after Larisa Iordache withdrew due to injury. She was the only Romanian female to qualify for any event finals. Munteanu went on to win the gold medal in the balance beam final with a score of 14.366 after qualifying in fourth place. She finished eighth in the floor final with a score of 13.866. After the European Championships, she stopped consistently training, but she was added as an alternate to the World Championships team after Cătălina Ponor withdrew due to injury. Although Anamaria Ocolișan went down with an ankle injury right before the competition, Munteanu was not added to the competition lineups. Munteanu was not selected for the training squad for the 2016 Olympic Games and was transferred out of the national training center in Izvorani.

Munteanu retired from gymnastics in 2016. She shared in an interview that after the 2015 European Championships, she dealt with anxiety which led to her reduced training and eventual retirement.

== Competitive history ==
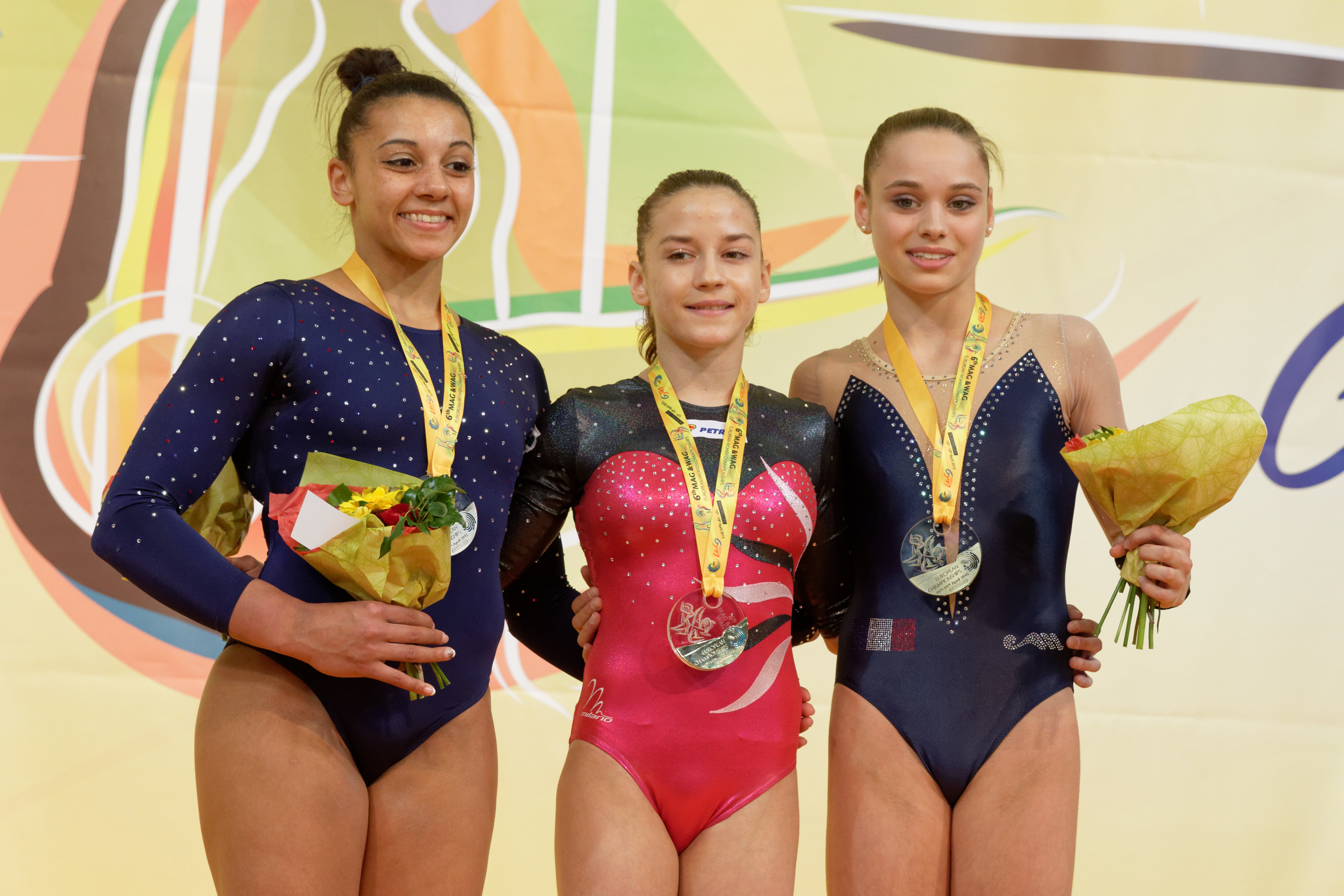
Munteanu (center) with her gold medal from the 2015 European Championships

Year	Event	Team	AA	VT	UB	BB	FX
Junior
2012
2012	Junior European Championships	3rd place, bronze medalist(s)	3rd place, bronze medalist(s)			2nd place, silver medalist(s)	3rd place, bronze medalist(s)
2013	International Gymnix		4	3rd place, bronze medalist(s)		1st place, gold medalist(s)	1st place, gold medalist(s)
2013	Chemnitz Friendly	3rd place, bronze medalist(s)	2nd place, silver medalist(s)				
2013	Lugano Trophy		1st place, gold medalist(s)	1st place, gold medalist(s)	2nd place, silver medalist(s)	1st place, gold medalist(s)	1st place, gold medalist(s)
2013	FRA-ROU Friendly	1st place, gold medalist(s)	1st place, gold medalist(s)	1st place, gold medalist(s)	4	1st place, gold medalist(s)	1st place, gold medalist(s)
2013	Japan Junior International		5			2nd place, silver medalist(s)	2nd place, silver medalist(s)
2013	Élite Gym Massilia	1st place, gold medalist(s)	2nd place, silver medalist(s)			2nd place, silver medalist(s)	3rd place, bronze medalist(s)
Senior
2014	Cottbus World Challenge Cup					3rd place, bronze medalist(s)	5
2014	City of Jesolo Trophy		13			1st place, gold medalist(s)	3rd place, bronze medalist(s)
2014	Beaumont en Véron Friendly	1st place, gold medalist(s)	6				
2014	European Championships	1st place, gold medalist(s)					
2014	Romanian Championships					1st place, gold medalist(s)	2nd place, silver medalist(s)
2014	Länderkampf Kunstturnen	2nd place, silver medalist(s)				2nd place, silver medalist(s)	5
2014	World Championships	4					
2015	Cottbus World Challenge Cup					1st place, gold medalist(s)	2nd place, silver medalist(s)
2015	European Championships					1st place, gold medalist(s)	8
