= Claire Martin (gymnast) =

French artistic gymnast

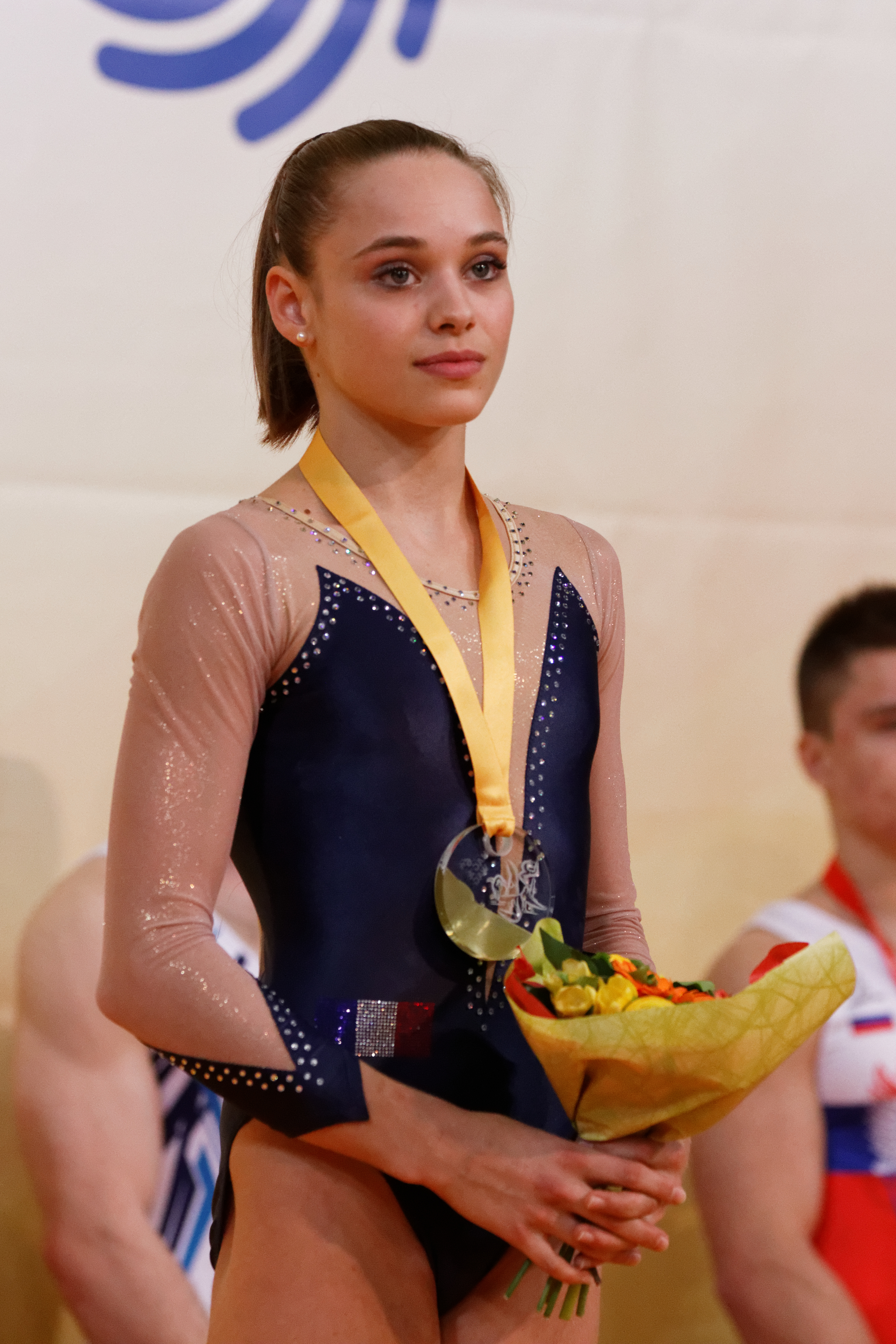
- Martin with her bronze medal at the 2015 European Championships

Personal information
- Full name: Claire Suzanne Martin
- Born: 12 May 1998 (age 28) Versailles, Île-de-France, France

Gymnastics career
- Discipline: Women's artistic gymnastics
- Country represented: France (2012-2017)
- Club: La Persévérante de Marsannay la Côte
- Head coach: Nellu Pop
- Retired: 2017
Medal record
Representing France
European Championships
Bronze medal – third place	2015 Montpellier	Balance beam

Claire Suzanne Martin (born 12 May 1998) is a French former artistic gymnast. She is the 2015 European bronze medalist on the balance beam. She finished seventh on the balance beam at the 2014 European Championships and represented France at the 2014 and 2015 World Championships.

== Early life ==
Claire Martin began gymnastics at the age of three at a club in Marsannay-la-Côte in a baby gymnastics class. At age eleven, Martin won the French Championships in the avenir division, and then at thirteen she won the espoir division.

== Junior gymnastics career ==
=== 2012 ===
Martin made her international debut at the International Gymnix in Montreal where she placed thirty-third in the all-around and fifth on the balance beam. She competed at the Junior European Championships and finished seventh with the French team. She won the all-around bronze medal at the French Junior Championships.

=== 2013 ===
Martin began her season by becoming French junior champion on the floor exercise and finishing second in the all-around and on the balance beam. A few months later, she competed in a friendly meet against Romania where she took silver in the all-around and bronze on the floor exercise. She then competed at the European Youth Olympic Festival in the Netherlands. She finished fourth in the team competition and won the bronze medal on the balance beam. At the end of the summer, she decided to leave her training center in Dijon to join INSEP in Paris. In September 2013, Martin won the all-around bronze medal at the National Cup in Mouilleron-le-Captif. She also finished fourth in the team competition, seventh in the all-around, and fifth on the balance beam at the Élite Gym Massilia in Marseille.

== Senior gymnastics career ==
=== 2014 ===
At her first senior competition, Martin finished fifth in the all-around at the French Championships. She then competed at a friendly meet against Romania and Belgium and helped the French team finish second. At the European Championships, she qualified for the balance beam final, but she crashed her double back dismount and finished in seventh place. She competed at a friendly meet against the Netherlands and Austria and helped the French team finish second. At the end of the season, Martin was selected to compete at the World Championships in Nanning, China where the French team finished thirteenth. She ended her season at the Élite Gym Massilia where she won the gold medal on the balance beam, finished twelfth on the all-around and sixth on the floor exercise.

=== 2015 ===
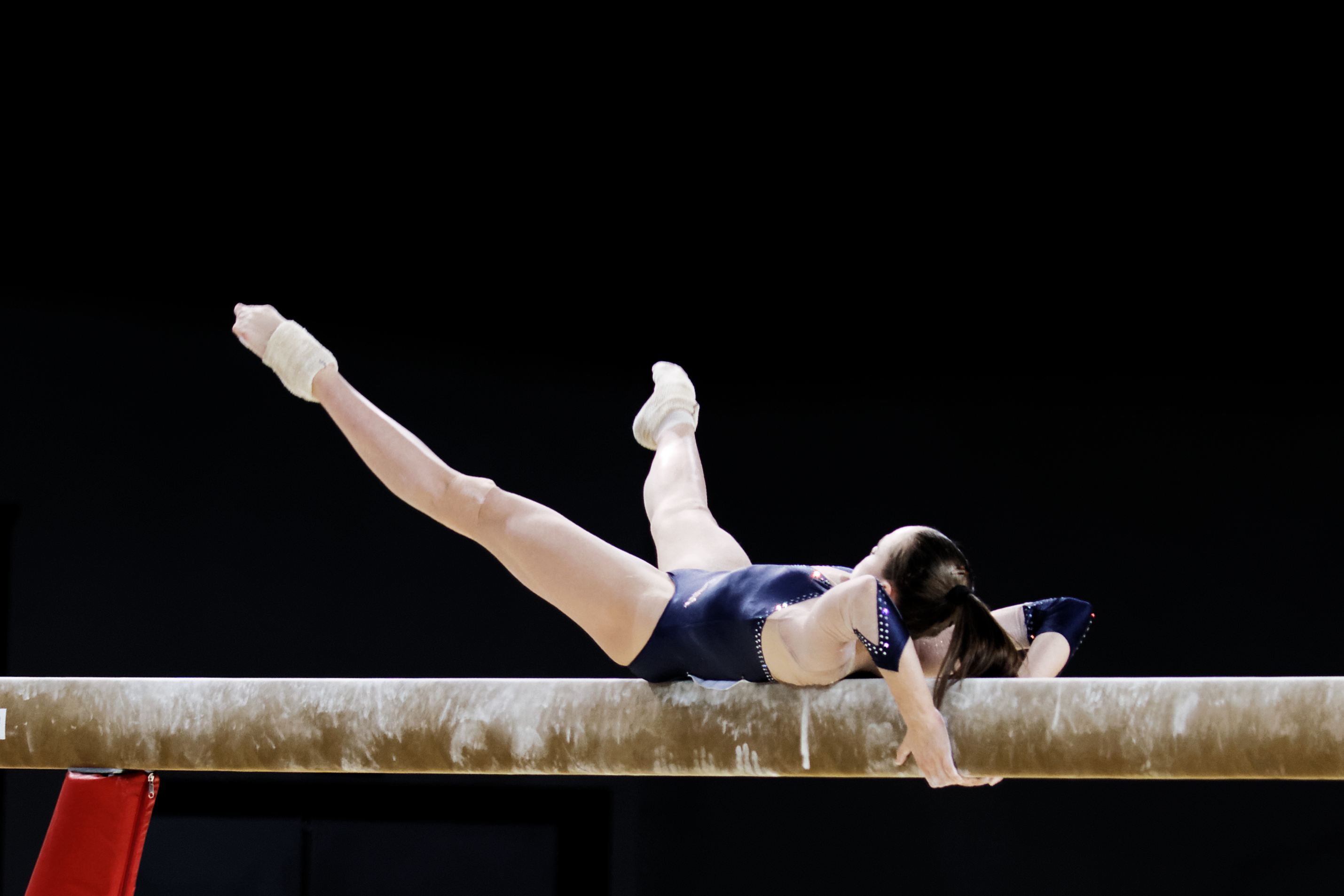
Martin on the balance beam at the 2015 European Championships.

Martin finished second on the balance beam and the floor exercise and fifth in the all-around at the French Championships in Rouen. At the Doha World Cup, she finished eighth on the floor exercise. She was selected for the European Championships in Montpellier where she finished thirteenth in the all-around and won the bronze medal on the balance beam behind Andreea Munteanu and Becky Downie. She then competed at two friendly meets- first against Romania where the French team finished second and then against Spain which France won. She was then selected to compete at the World Championships in Glasgow alongside Marine Brevet, Loan His, Anne Kuhm, Valentine Pikul, and Louise Vanhille, and they placed tenth. She finished her season at the Élite Gym Massilia where she finished sixth on the balance beam.

=== 2016–2017 ===
Martin's final competition was the 2016 French Championships where she only competed on the balance beam and floor exercise- failing to qualify for either event final. She retired in January 2017 due to various injuries following the 2015 World Championships.

== Personal life ==
In 2017, Martin obtained a Bachelor of Science degree and moved to Antibes, and she started a BTS in dietetics. Since September 2021, she has been in nursing school at IFSI Macon.

== Competitive history ==
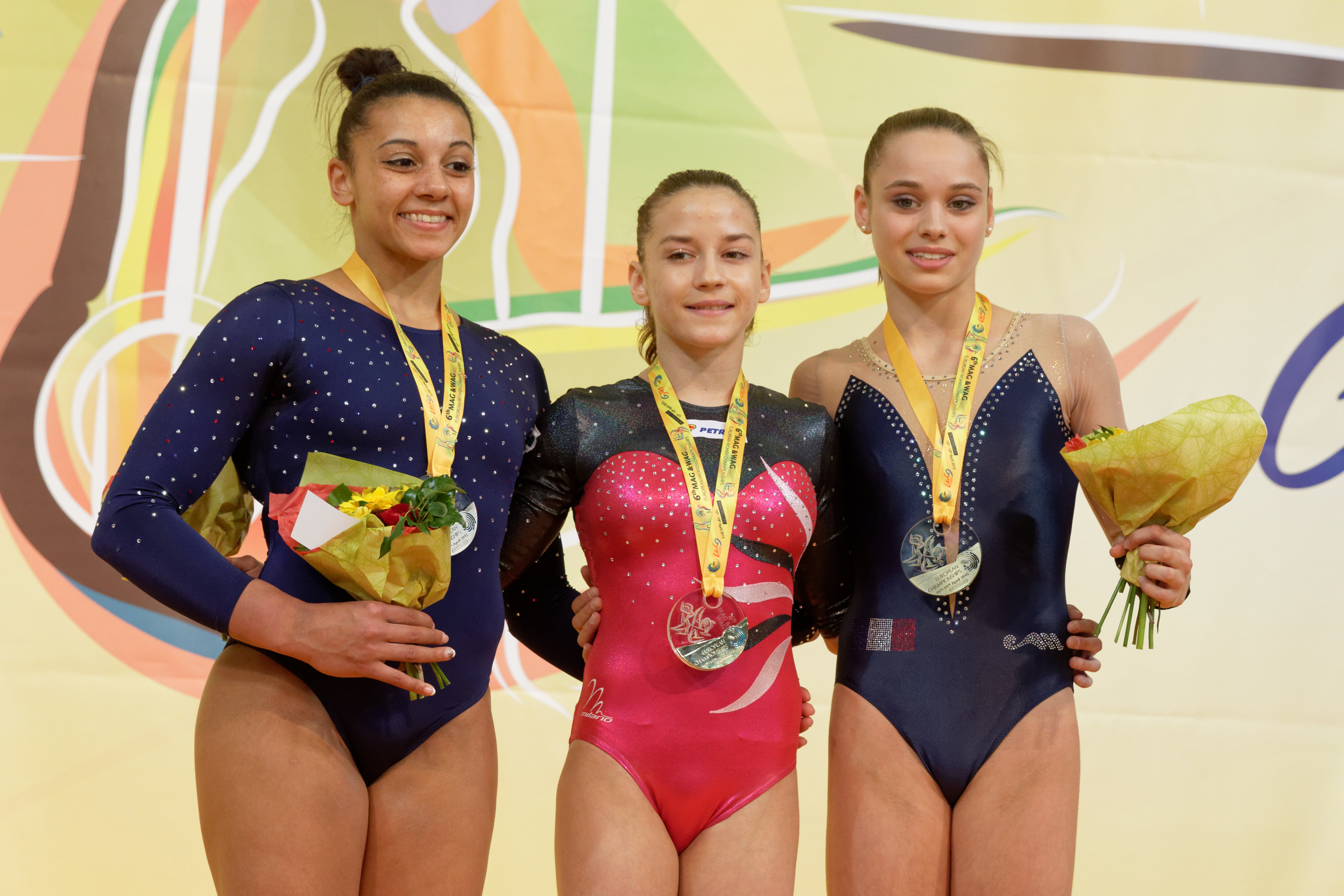
Martin (right) with her bronze medal at the 2015 European Championships.

Competitive history of Claire Martin at the junior level
Year	Event	Team	AA	VT	UB	BB	FX
2012	International Gymnix		33			5	
2012	Junior European Championships	7					
2012	French Championships		3rd place, bronze medalist(s)				
2013	French Championships		2nd place, silver medalist(s)			2nd place, silver medalist(s)	1st place, gold medalist(s)
2013	FRA-ROU Friendly	2nd place, silver medalist(s)	2nd place, silver medalist(s)			1st place, gold medalist(s)	3rd place, bronze medalist(s)
2013	European Youth Olympic Festival	4	15			3rd place, bronze medalist(s)	
2013	National Cup		3rd place, bronze medalist(s)				
2013	Élite Gym Massilia	4	7			5	

Competitive history of Claire Martin at the senior level
Year	Event	Team	AA	VT	UB	BB	FX
2014	French Championships		5				
2014	BEL-FRA-ROU Friendly	2nd place, silver medalist(s)					
2014	European Championships					7	
2014	FRA-NED-AUT Friendly	2nd place, silver medalist(s)					
2014	World Championships	13					
2014	Élite Gym Massilia		12			1st place, gold medalist(s)	6
2015	French Championships		5			2nd place, silver medalist(s)	2nd place, silver medalist(s)
2015	Doha World Cup						8
2015	European Championships		13			3rd place, bronze medalist(s)	
2015	FRA-ROU Friendly	2nd place, silver medalist(s)					
2015	FRA-ESP Friendly	1st place, gold medalist(s)					
2015	World Championships	10					
2015	Élite Gym Massilia					6	
