= 2012 European Women's Artistic Gymnastics Championships =

29th European Women's Artistic Gymnastics Championships
- Location: Brussels, Belgium
- Dates: 9 May to 13 May 2012
- Nations: Members of the European Union of Gymnastics

The 29th European Women's Artistic Gymnastics Championships were held from 9 May to 13 May 2012 in Brussels.

== Timetable ==
Date	Time	Event
9 May	13.00 - 20.30	Qualifications Juniors
10 May	10.00 – 19.25	Qualifications Seniors
11 May	19.00 – 21.15	Individual Competition Juniors
12 May	15.00 – 17.15	Group Competition Seniors
13 May	9.00 – 12.30	Apparatus Finals Juniors
13 May	14.00 – 17.00	Apparatus Finals Seniors

== Medalists ==
Event	Gold	Silver	Bronze
Seniors
Team	Romania; Larisa Iordache; Cătălina Ponor; Diana Bulimar; Sandra Izbașa; Raluca Haidu	Russia; Anastasia Grishina; Aliya Mustafina; Viktoria Komova; Anastasia Sidorova; Maria Paseka	Italy; Erika Fasana; Vanessa Ferrari; Carlotta Ferlito; Francesca Deagostini; Giorgia Campana
Vault	(Romania) Sandra Izbașa	(Germany) Oksana Chusovitina	(Switzerland) Giulia Steingruber
Uneven bars	(Russia) Viktoria Komova	(Russia) Anastasia Grishina	(Ukraine) Natalia Kononenko
Balance beam	(Romania) Cătălina Ponor	(Romania) Larisa Iordache	(United Kingdom) Hannah Whelan
Floor	(Romania) Larisa Iordache	(Romania) Cătălina Ponor	(United Kingdom) Hannah Whelan
Juniors
Team	Russia; Evgeniya Shelgunova; Maria Kharenkova; Yulia Tipaeva; Viktoria Kuzmina; Ekaterina Baturina	Italy; Elisa Meneghini; Enus Mariani; Lara Mori; Tea Ugrin; Alessia Leolini	Romania; Andreea Munteanu; Miriam Aribășoiu; Ștefania Stănilă; Silvia Zarzu; Paula Tudorache
Individual all-around	(Italy) Enus Mariani	(Russia) Evgeniya Shelgunova	(Romania) Andreea Munteanu
Vault	(Netherlands) Chantysha Netteb	(Romania) Ștefania Stănilă	(Russia) Maria Kharenkova
Uneven bars	(Germany) Sophie Scheder	(Russia) Victoria Kuzmina	(Russia) Evgeniya Shelgunova
Balance beam	(Russia) Maria Kharenkova	(Romania) Andreea Munteanu	(Italy) Elisa Meneghini
Floor	(Russia) Maria Kharenkova	(Romania) Silvia Zarzu	(United Kingdom) Gabrielle Jupp (Romania) Andreea Munteanu

== Detail results ==
=== Seniors ===
==== Team ====
Senior	Name	Country	Date of birth	Age
Youngest	Anne Kuhm	France	17/12/96	15 years
Oldest	Oksana Chusovitina	Germany	19/06/75	36 years

Rank	Team	Vault (gymnastics)	Uneven bars	Balance beam	Floor (gymnastics)	Total
1st place, gold medalist(s)	Romania	45.291 (1)	42.099 (4)	44.499 (1)	44.399 (1)	176.288
1st place, gold medalist(s)	Larisa Iordache	15.058	14.333	14.333	15.033	176.288
1st place, gold medalist(s)	Cătălina Ponor	15.033		15.433	14.733	176.288
1st place, gold medalist(s)	Diana Bulimar		13.933	14.733	14.633	176.288
1st place, gold medalist(s)	Sandra Izbașa	15.200				176.288
1st place, gold medalist(s)	Raluca Haidu		13.833			176.288
2nd place, silver medalist(s)	Russia	44.732 (2)	46.932 (1)	41.398 (3)	42.474 (3)	175.536
2nd place, silver medalist(s)	Anastasia Grishina	14.733	15.333	14.366	14.466	175.536
2nd place, silver medalist(s)	Aliya Mustafina	15.166	15.833		13.933	175.536
2nd place, silver medalist(s)	Viktoria Komova		15.766	13.966		175.536
2nd place, silver medalist(s)	Anastasia Sidorova			13.066	14.075	175.536
2nd place, silver medalist(s)	Maria Paseka	14.833				175.536
3rd place, bronze medalist(s)	Italy	43.065 (5)	42.599 (3)	43.200 (2)	42.566 (2)	171.430
3rd place, bronze medalist(s)	Erika Fasana	14.633	13.900	14.000	14.266	171.430
3rd place, bronze medalist(s)	Vanessa Ferrari	14.266	14.466		14.400	171.430
3rd place, bronze medalist(s)	Carlotta Ferlito	14.166		14.900	13.900	171.430
3rd place, bronze medalist(s)	Francesca Deagostini			14.300		171.430
3rd place, bronze medalist(s)	Giorgia Campana		14.233			171.430
4	Great Britain	43.232 (3)	42.632 (2)	40.333 (7)	41.566 (4)	167.763
4	Hannah Whelan	14.066	14.033	13.333	14.066	167.763
4	Rebecca Tunney	14.600	14.266		13.900	167.763
4	Ruby Harrold	14.566	14.333			167.763
4	Jennifer Pinches			13.000	13.600	167.763
4	Danusia Francis			14.000		167.763
5	France	43.132 (4)	41.266 (6)	40.665 (4)	39.232 (8)	164.295
5	Anne Kuhm	14.533	13.700	13.833	14.166	164.295
5	Youna Dufournet	14.433	14.100	13.866		164.295
5	Sophia Serseri	14.166		12.966	12.500	164.295
5	Valentine Sabatou		13.466		12.866	164.295
5	Marine Brevet					164.295
6	Belgium	41.924 (8)	40.999 (7)	40.366 (6)	40.532 (5)	163.821
6	Julie Croket	14.233	13.433	13.500	13.066	163.821
6	Gaelle Mys	13.733		14.300	13.600	163.821
6	Terri Grand'ry	13.958	13.666		13.866	163.821
6	Eline Vandersteen			12.566		163.821
6	Lisa Verschueren		13.900			163.821
7	Spain	42.066 (7)	41.400 (5)	40.499 (5)	39.557 (7)	163.522
7	Ana María Izurieta	14.300	14.000	13.333	13.566	163.522
7	María Paula Vargas	13.966	14.000	13.233	13.366	163.522
7	Silvia Colussi		13.400	13.933		163.522
7	Toya Rojas	13.800				163.522
7	Ainhoa Carmona				12.625	163.522
8	Germany	42.933 (6)	39.599 (8)	38.099 (8)	39.866 (6)	160.497
8	Lisa Katharina Hill	14.000	13.800	13.133	13.433	160.497
8	Nadine Jarosch	13.900	13.133	12.466		160.497
8	Kim Bùi		12.666	12.500	13.233	160.497
8	Oksana Chusovitina	15.033				160.497
8	Pia Tolle				13.200	160.497

==== Vault ====
Oldest and youngest competitors

Senior	Name	Country	Date of birth	Age
Youngest	Erika Fasana	Italy	17/02/96	16 years
Oldest	Oksana Chusovitina	Germany	19/06/75	36 years

Rank	Gymnast	D Score	E Score	Pen.	Score 1	D Score	E Score	Pen.	Score 2	Total
1st place, gold medalist(s)	Sandra Izbașa (ROU)	6.100	8.800		14.900	5.800	9.066		14.866	14.883
2nd place, silver medalist(s)	Oksana Chusovitina (GER)	6.300	8.633		14.933	5.500	8.933		14.433	14.683
3rd place, bronze medalist(s)	Giulia Steingruber (SUI)	6.300	8.916		15.216	5.200	8.833		14.033	14.624
4	Valeriia Maksiuta (ISR)	5.800	8.900		14.700	5.900	8.400		14.300	14.500
5	Anastasia Grishina (RUS)	5.800	8.733		14.533	5.200	8.800		14.000	14.266
6	Wyomi Masela (NED)	5.800	8.700		14.500	5.000	8.833		13.833	14.166
7	Erika Fasana (ITA)	5.800	8.441		14.241	5.000	8.766		13.766	14.003
8	Dorina Böczögő (HUN)	5.300	7.733	-0.3	12.733	5.000	7.733		12.733	12.733
Rank	Gymnast	Vault 1				Vault 2				Total

==== Uneven Bars ====
Oldest and youngest competitors

	Name	Country	Date of birth	Age
Youngest	Ruby Harrold	United Kingdom	04/06/96	15 years
Oldest	Kim Bùi	Germany	20/01/89	23 years

Rank	Gymnast	D Score	E Score	Pen.	Total
1st place, gold medalist(s)	Viktoria Komova (RUS)	6.700	8.966		15.666
2nd place, silver medalist(s)	Anastasia Grishina (RUS)	6.500	8.700		15.200
3rd place, bronze medalist(s)	Natalia Kononenko (UKR)	6.700	8.433		15.133
4	Kim Bùi (GER)	6.200	8.500		14.700
5	Céline van Gerner (NED)	6.200	8.433		14.633
6	Lisa Katharina Hill (GER)	5.900	8.525		14.425
7	Ruby Harrold (GBR)	6.100	8.266		14.366
8	Youna Dufournet (FRA)	6.200	7.866		14.066

==== Balance Beam ====
Oldest and youngest competitors

	Name	Country	Date of birth	Age
Youngest	Larisa Iordache	Romania	19/06/96	15 years
Oldest	Vasiliki Millousi	Greece	04/05/84	28 years

Rank	Gymnast	D Score	E Score	Pen.	Total
1st place, gold medalist(s)	Cătălina Ponor (ROU)	6.400	8.900		15.300
2nd place, silver medalist(s)	Larisa Iordache (ROU)	6.400	8.733		15.133
3rd place, bronze medalist(s)	Hannah Whelan (GBR)	6.000	8.333		14.333
4	Anastasia Grishina (RUS)	6.300	7.766		14.066
5	Youna Dufournet (FRA)	5.800	7.566		13.366
6	Viktoria Komova (RUS)	5.800	7.300		13.100
7	Vasiliki Millousi (GRE)	6.100	6.800		12.900
8	Valeriia Maksiuta (ISR)	5.800	6.266		12.066

==== Floor ====
Oldest and youngest competitors

	Name	Country	Date of birth	Age
Youngest	Rebecca Tunney	United Kingdom	26/10/96	15 years
Oldest	Marta Pihan-Kulesza	Poland	23/07/87	24 years

Rank	Gymnast	D Score	E Score	Pen.	Total
1st place, gold medalist(s)	Larisa Iordache (ROU)	6.400	8.833		15.233
2nd place, silver medalist(s)	Cătălina Ponor (ROU)	6.000	8.633		14.633
3rd place, bronze medalist(s)	Hannah Whelan (GBR)	5.900	8.633		14.533
4	Vanessa Ferrari (ITA)	5.900	8.500		14.400
5	Rebecca Tunney (GBR)	5.700	8.300	-0.2	13.800
6	Mariya Livchikova (UKR)	5.100	8.366		13.466
7	Marta Pihan-Kulesza (POL)	5.300	8.100		13.400
8	Julie Croket (BEL)	5.600	7.266		12.866

=== Juniors ===
==== Team ====
Rank	Team	Vault (gymnastics)	Uneven bars	Balance beam	Floor (gymnastics)	Total
1st place, gold medalist(s)	Russia	41.366 (1)	42.966 (1)	41.266 (2)	41.732 (1)	167.330
1st place, gold medalist(s)	Evgeniya Shelgunova	13.200	14.333	13.766	13.866	167.330
1st place, gold medalist(s)	Maria Kharenkova	14.100		14.100	14.366	167.330
1st place, gold medalist(s)	Yulia Tipaeva	14.066	14.300		13.500	167.330
1st place, gold medalist(s)	Viktoria Kuzmina		14.333	13.400		167.330
1st place, gold medalist(s)	Ekaterina Baturina					167.330
2nd place, silver medalist(s)	Italy	41.199 (2)	40.433 (3)	40.833 (3)	41.566 (2)	164.031
2nd place, silver medalist(s)	Elisa Meneghini	13.800	13.700	14.100	13.833	164.031
2nd place, silver medalist(s)	Enus Mariani	13.766	13.433	13.100	13.900	164.031
2nd place, silver medalist(s)	Lara Mori	13.633			13.833	164.031
2nd place, silver medalist(s)	Tea Ugrin		13.300	13.633		164.031
2nd place, silver medalist(s)	Alessia Leolini					164.031
3rd place, bronze medalist(s)	Romania	40.965 (3)	37.907 (8)	41.333 (1)	40.832 (3)	161.037
3rd place, bronze medalist(s)	Andreea Munteanu	13.666	13.033	14.300	13.666	161.037
3rd place, bronze medalist(s)	Miriam Aribășoiu		12.208	13.500	13.266	161.037
3rd place, bronze medalist(s)	Ștefania Stănilă	13.966		13.533		161.037
3rd place, bronze medalist(s)	Silvia Zarzu	13.333			13.900	161.037
3rd place, bronze medalist(s)	Paula Tudorache		12.666			161.037
4	Great Britain	40.499 (6)	39.699 (5)	40.024 (4)	39.899 (4)	160.121
4	Gabrielle Jupp	13.666		14.283	13.433	160.121
4	Charlie Fellows	13.300	13.433		13.333	160.121
4	Angel Romaeo		13.333	13.333	13.133	160.121
4	Raer Theaker	13.533	12.933			160.121
4	Georgina Hockenhull			12.408		160.121
5	Germany	40.566 (5)	40.174 (4)	38.433 (8)	38.699 (7)	157.872
5	Sophie Scheder	13.433	14.441	13.433	12.933	157.872
5	Alina Ehret	13.333	13.233	12.300	12.733	157.872
5	Pauline Schäfer	13.800		12.700		157.872
5	Leah Griesser				13.033	157.872
5	Nicole Ster		12.500			157.872
6	Netherlands	40.832 (4)	38.532 (7)	39.065 (5)	38.932 (6)	157.361
6	Eythora Thorsdottir	13.700	12.833	13.566	13.133	157.361
6	Chantysha Netteb	14.266	12.633	12.533	13.033	157.361
6	Sanna Overbeek	12.866	13.066			157.361
6	Daphne Slingerland			12.966	12.766	157.361
6	Shirley van Deene					157.361
7	France	39.299 (8)	39.399 (6)	38.698 (6)	39.066 (5)	156.462
7	Louise Vanhille	13.133	13.266		13.200	156.462
7	Claire Martin		13.100	12.866	13.000	156.462
7	Valentine Pikul	13.366		12.066	12.866	156.462
7	Clara Chambellant	12.800	13.033			156.462
7	Maëlys Plessis			13.766		156.462
8	Ukraine	39.898 (7)	40.666 (2)	38.665 (7)	37.166 (8)	156.395
8	Darya Matveyeva	13.466	13.533	13.033	11.466	156.395
8	Darya Kloptsova		13.233	12.366	12.800	156.395
8	Olena Vasylieva	13.266	13.900			156.395
8	Yana Fedorova	13.166			12.900	156.395
8	Anastasia Ilnytska			13.266		156.395

==== All-Around ====
Senior	Name	Country	Date of birth	Age
Youngest	Alina Ehret	Germany	27/11/98	13 years
Oldest	Sophie Scheder	Germany	07/01/97	15 years

Rank	Gymnast	Vault (gymnastics)	Uneven bars	Balance beam	Floor (gymnastics)	Total
1st place, gold medalist(s)	Enus Mariani (ITA)	13.700	14.566	13.966	14.033	56.265
2nd place, silver medalist(s)	Evgeniya Shelgunova (RUS)	14.133	13.400	14.066	13.600	55.199
3rd place, bronze medalist(s)	Andreea Munteanu (ROU)	13.858	12.766	14.400	13.833	54.857
4	Elisa Meneghini (ITA)	13.833	14.266	13.000	13.683	54.782
5	Gabrielle Jupp (GBR)	13.766	13.433	13.833	13.666	54.698
6	Maria Kharenkova (RUS)	13.866	13.666	12.966	14.133	54.631
7	Bérengère Fransolet (BEL)	13.775	12.833	13.541	12.900	53.049
8	Sophie Scheder (GER)	13.533	14.333	11.966	13.166	52.998
9	Noémi Makra (HUN)	13.366	13.00	13.533	13.033	52.932
10	Eythora Thorsdottir (NED)	13.466	12.566	13.266	13.433	52.731
11	Roxana Popa (ESP)	14.641	13.233	12.300	12.366	52.540
12	Ștefania Stănilă (ROU)	14.166	12.366	13.333	12.066	51.931
13	Darya Matveyeva (UKR)	13.500	11.566	13.700	12.933	51.699
14	Olena Vasylieva (UKR)	13.666	14.433	12.033	11.150	51.282
15	Angel Romaeo (GBR)	13.233	11.400	13.333	13.200	51.166
16	Emma Larsson (SWE)	13.333	11.800	13.000	12.841	50.974
17	Alina Ehret (GER)	13.400	12.733	12.566	12.133	50.832
18	Ilaria Käslin (SUI)	12.833	11.266	13.333	12.966	50.398
19	Dayana Hryhoryeva (BLR)	12.866	12.266	12.366	12.866	50.364
20	Clara Chambellant (FRA)	12.933	11.900	12.633	12.633	50.099
21	Valentine Pikul (FRA)	12.566	12.866	11.433	12.833	49.698
22	Chantysha Netteb (NED)	14.200	9.500	12.500	13.000	49.200
23	Petra Fialová (CZE)	12.433	12.900	11.600	11.266	48.199
24	Katsiaryna Fiadutsik (BLR)	12.833	10.466	11.800	11.733	46.832

==== Vault ====
Oldest and youngest competitors

	Name	Country	Date of birth	Age
Youngest	Maria Kharenkova	Russia	29/10/98	13 years
Oldest	Roxana Popa	Spain	02/06/97	14 years

Rank	Gymnast	D Score	E Score	Pen.	Score 1	D Score	E Score	Pen.	Score 2	Total
1st place, gold medalist(s)	Chantysha Netteb (NED)	5.0	9.100		14.100	5.3	8.866		14.166	14.133
2nd place, silver medalist(s)	Ștefania Stănilă (ROU)	5.0	8.600		13.600	5.8	8.333		14.133	13.866
3rd place, bronze medalist(s)	Maria Kharenkova (RUS)	4.7	8.733		13.433	5.0	8.966		13.966	13.699
4	Ana Đerek (CRO)	5.2	8.483		13.683	4.8	8.866		13.666	13.674
5	Enus Mariani (ITA)	5.0	8.900		13.900	4.4	8.916		13.316	13.608
6	Roxana Popa (ESP)	5.0	8.766		13.766	5.8	7.466		13.266	13.516
6	Elisa Meneghini (ITA)	5.0	8.800		13.800	4.4	8.833		13.233	13.516
8	Noémi Makra (HUN)	5.0	8.466		13.466	4.6	8.733		13.333	13.399
Rank	Gymnast	Vault 1				Vault 2				Total

==== Uneven Bars ====
Rank	Gymnast	D Score	E Score	Pen.	Total
1st place, gold medalist(s)	Sophie Scheder (GER)	6.0	8.566		14.566
2nd place, silver medalist(s)	Viktoria Kuzmina (RUS)	6.0	8.466		14.466
3rd place, bronze medalist(s)	Evgeniya Shelgunova (RUS)	5.7	8.66		14.366
4	Darya Matveyeva (UKR)	5.7	8.300		14.000
5	Dayana Hryhoryeva (BLR)	5.2	8.66		13.866
6	Evangelia Plyta (GRE)	5.7	8.133		13.833
7	Elisa Meneghini (ITA)	5.6	7.600		13.200
8	Olena Vasylieva (UKR)	5.8	6.933		12.733

==== Balance Beam ====
Oldest and youngest competitors

	Name	Country	Date of birth	Age
Youngest	Maria Kharenkova	Russia	29/10/98	13 years
Oldest	Gabrielle Jupp	United Kingdom	12/06/97	14 years

Rank	Gymnast	D Score	E Score	Pen.	Total
1st place, gold medalist(s)	Maria Kharenkova (RUS)	6.1	8.666		14.766
2nd place, silver medalist(s)	Andreea Munteanu (ROU)	5.7	8.733		14.433
3rd place, bronze medalist(s)	Elisa Meneghini (ITA)	5.6	8.633		14.233
4	Tea Ugrin (ITA)	5.5	8.633		14.133
4	Evgeniya Shelgunova (RUS)	5.7	8.433		14.133
6	Gabrielle Jupp (GBR)	5.5	8.200		13.700
7	Maëlys Plessis (FRA)	5.2	7.733	-0.1	12.833
8	Eythora Thorsdottir (NED)	5.3	5.866		11.166

==== Floor ====
Oldest and youngest competitors

	Name	Country	Date of birth	Age
Youngest	Silvia Zarzu	Romania	16/12/98	13 years
Oldest	Charlie Fellows	United Kingdom	01/01/97	15 years

Rank	Gymnast	D Score	E Score	Pen.	Total
1st place, gold medalist(s)	Maria Kharenkova (RUS)	5.6	8.733	-0.1	14.233
2nd place, silver medalist(s)	Silvia Zarzu (ROU)	5.4	8.533		13.933
3rd place, bronze medalist(s)	Gabrielle Jupp (GBR)	5.4	8.500		13.900
3rd place, bronze medalist(s)	Andreea Munteanu (ROU)	5.2	8.700		13.900
5	Elisa Meneghini (ITA)	5.3	8.533		13.833
6	Evgeniya Shelgunova (RUS)	5.3	8.266		13.566
7	Charlie Fellows (GBR)	5.4	8.066		13.466
8	Enus Mariani (ITA)	5.4	8.333	-0.3	13.433

== Medal Count ==
=== Combined ===
Rank	Nation	Gold	Silver	Bronze	Total
1	Romania	4	5	3	12
2	Russia	4	4	2	10
3	Italy	1	1	2	4
4	Germany	1	1	0	2
5	Netherlands	1	0	0	1
6	Great Britain	0	0	3	3
7	Switzerland	0	0	1	1
7	Ukraine	0	0	1	1
Totals (8 entries)		11	11	12	34

=== Seniors ===
Rank	Nation	Gold	Silver	Bronze	Total
1	Romania	4	2	0	6
2	Russia	1	2	0	3
3	Germany	0	1	0	1
4	Great Britain	0	0	2	2
5	Italy	0	0	1	1
5	Switzerland	0	0	1	1
5	Ukraine	0	0	1	1
Totals (7 entries)		5	5	5	15

=== Juniors ===
Rank	Nation	Gold	Silver	Bronze	Total
1	Russia	3	2	2	7
2	Italy	1	1	1	3
3	Germany	1	0	0	1
3	Netherlands	1	0	0	1
5	Romania	0	3	3	6
6	Great Britain	0	0	1	1
Totals (6 entries)		6	6	7	19

== Oldest and youngest competitors ==
Senior	Name	Country	Date of birth	Age
Youngest	Anne Kuhm	France	17/12/96	15 years
Oldest	Oksana Chusovitina	Germany	19/06/75	36 years

Junior	Name	Country	Date of birth	Age
Youngest	Cristina Tudorache	Romania	23/12/98	13 years
Oldest	Charlie Fellows	United Kingdom	01/01/97	15 years
