= Diana Bulimar =

Romanian artistic gymnast (born 1995)

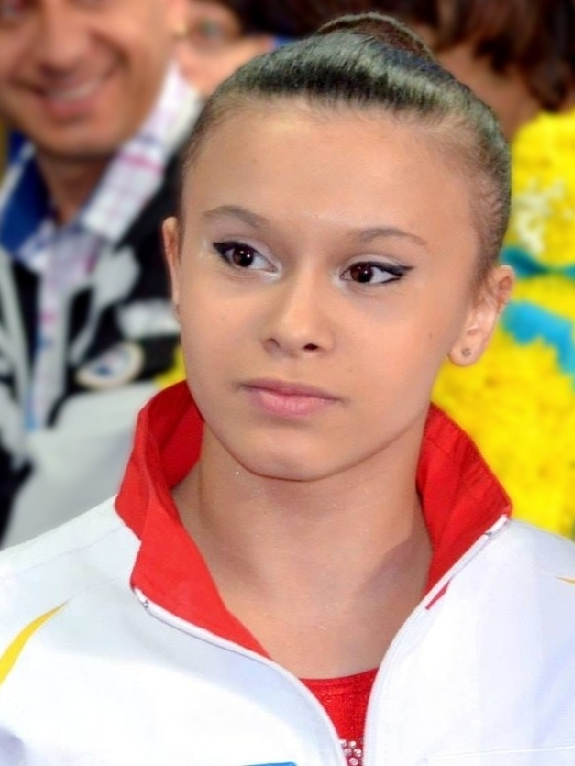
- Bulimar in 2014

Personal information
- Full name: Diana Laura Bulimar
- Nickname: Didi
- Born: 22 August 1995 (age 31) Timișoara, Romania
- Height: 155 cm (5 ft 1 in)

Gymnastics career
- Discipline: Women's artistic gymnastics
- Country represented: Romania; (2008–16 (ROU))
- Club: CS Dinamo Bucharest
- Head coaches: Octavian Bellu, Mariana Bitang
- Assistant coaches: Lucian Sandu, Mircea Vintila, Raluca Bugner
- Former coaches: Cristian Moldovan, Lacramioara Moldovan
- Choreographer: Mariana Ristea
- Music: 2011–2013:"Areg" by Samvel Yervinyan; 2013–2014:"Butterfly Dance" by HANA; 2015: "Janaam Samhja Karo"
- Eponymous skills: Switch leap with 1/4 with additional full turn (D) – Floor exercise
Medal record
Event	1st	2nd	3rd
Olympic Games	0	0	1
European Championships	2	1	1
Youth Olympic Games	0	1	0
Total	2	2	2
Representing Romania
Olympic Games
Bronze medal – third place	2012 London	Team
European Championships
Gold medal – first place	2012 Brussels	Team
Gold medal – first place	2014 Sofia	Team
Silver medal – second place	2013 Moscow	Balance Beam
Bronze medal – third place	2013 Moscow	Floor Exercise
Youth Olympic Games
Silver medal – second place	2010 Singapore	Floor Exercise
Event	1st	2nd	3rd
FIG World Cup	2	6	3

Diana Laura Bulimar (Romanian pronunciation: [diˈana buliˈmar]; born 22 August 1995) is a Romanian artistic gymnast and a 2-time European Champion with Romania. She was part of the Romanian team at the 2012 Summer Olympics that won the bronze medal.

== Junior career ==
=== 2010 ===
In April, Bulimar competed at the 2010 European Women's Artistic Gymnastics Championships in Birmingham, United Kingdom. She contributed an all around score of 54.525 toward the Romanian team's second-place finish. Individually, she placed fourth in the all around final with a score of 54.175. In event finals, she placed third on uneven bars scoring 13.575 and fourth on floor scoring 14.175.

In August, Bulimar competed at the Youth Olympic Games in Singapore. She placed sixth in the all around competition with a score of 53.950. In event finals, she placed seventh on vault scoring 13.412, seventh on uneven bars scoring 12.525, and second on floor scoring 14.325.

In September, Bulimar competed at the Romanian National Championships in Reşiţa, Romania. She placed second in the all around competition with a score of 54.750.

== Senior career ==
=== 2011 ===
In August, Bulimar competed at the Romanian National Championships in Onesti, Romania. She placed fourth in the all around with a score of 56.375.

In September, Bulimar at an international meet against Germany and Switzerland in Erzingen, Germany. She helped Romania to win the team competition and individually she placed third in the all around with a score of 56.350.

In October, Bulimar competed at the 2011 World Artistic Gymnastics Championships in Tokyo, Japan. She contributed a floor score of 14.266 toward the Romanian team's fourth-place finish.

=== 2012 ===
In March, Bulimar competed at the Artistic Gymnastics World Cup event in Doha, Qatar. She placed fifth on uneven bars with a score of 14.275 and second on floor with a score of 14.725. The following month Bulimar competed at an international meet against France in Cholet, France. She helped Romania to win the team competition with scores of 13.550 on uneven bars, 14.900 on balance beam, and 14.400 on floor. She next competed at an international meet against Germany and the United Kingdom in Ulm, Germany. She helped Romania to win the team competition with scores of 13.950 on uneven bars, 14.550 on balance beam, and 14.450 on floor.

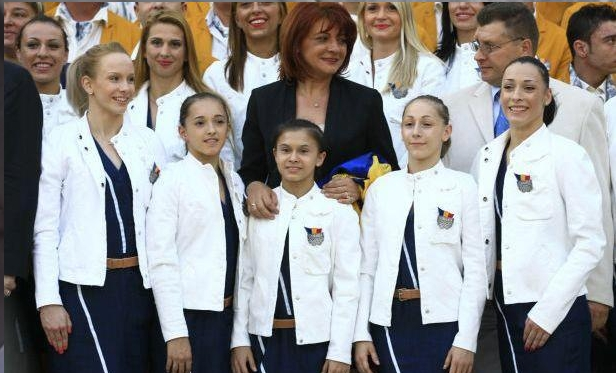
Bulimar (center) with the 2012 Olympic Romanian team.

In May, Bulimar competed at the 2012 European Women's Artistic Gymnastics Championships in Brussels, Belgium. She contributed scores of 13.933 on uneven bars, 14.733 on balance beam, and 14.633 on floor towards the Romanian team's first-place finish. In June Bulimar competed at the Artistic Gymnastics World Cup event in Ghent, Belgium. She placed second on balance beam with a score of 14.625 and first on floor with a score of 14.375.

At the beginning of July, Bulimar competed at an international meet against France, Germany, and Italy in Bucharest, Romania. She helped Romania to win the team competition with scores of 14.100 on uneven bars, 15.400 on balance beam, and 14.500 on floor.

==== London Olympics ====
At the end of July, Bulimar competed at the 2012 Summer Olympics in London, United Kingdom. She helped the Romanian team qualify in fourth place to the team final and individually she qualified to the balance beam final with a score of 14.866. In the team final, she contributed scores of 14.066 on uneven bars, 14.533 on balance beam, and 14.700 on floor towards the Romanian team's third-place finish. However, it was decided that Larisa Iordache would take place in the balance beam final instead of Bulimar.

=== 2013 ===
At the 2013 La Roche-sur-Yon World Cup, Bulimar placed second on floor.

At the 6th Doha FIG World Challenge Cup in Qatar, Bulimar placed fifth on the uneven bars final on 28 March 2013. On 29 March, she placed fourth on the balance beam final and first on the floor exercise final ahead of compatriot Larisa Iordache with a score of 14.625.

At the 2013 European Championships in Moscow, Russia, Bulimar placed second in the all-around qualification, sixth on individual vault, twenty-sixth on the uneven bars qualification, second on balance beam qualification and fifth on floor exercise qualification on 18 April. On 19 April, she tied with Giulia Steingruber of Switzerland for fourth place in the all-around final with a score of 57.065.

In June she won gold on floor exercise (tied with teammate Larisa Iordache) and bronze on beam at the 2013 Anadia World Cup. Her last competition of the year was the Turnen Dames Interland where she won gold in the all-around, balance beam, and floor exercise, and a bronze on uneven bars. She was scheduled to compete at the Romanian National Championships, but she dislocated her kneecap during podium training and needed immediate surgery, taking her out for the rest of the season.

=== 2014 ===
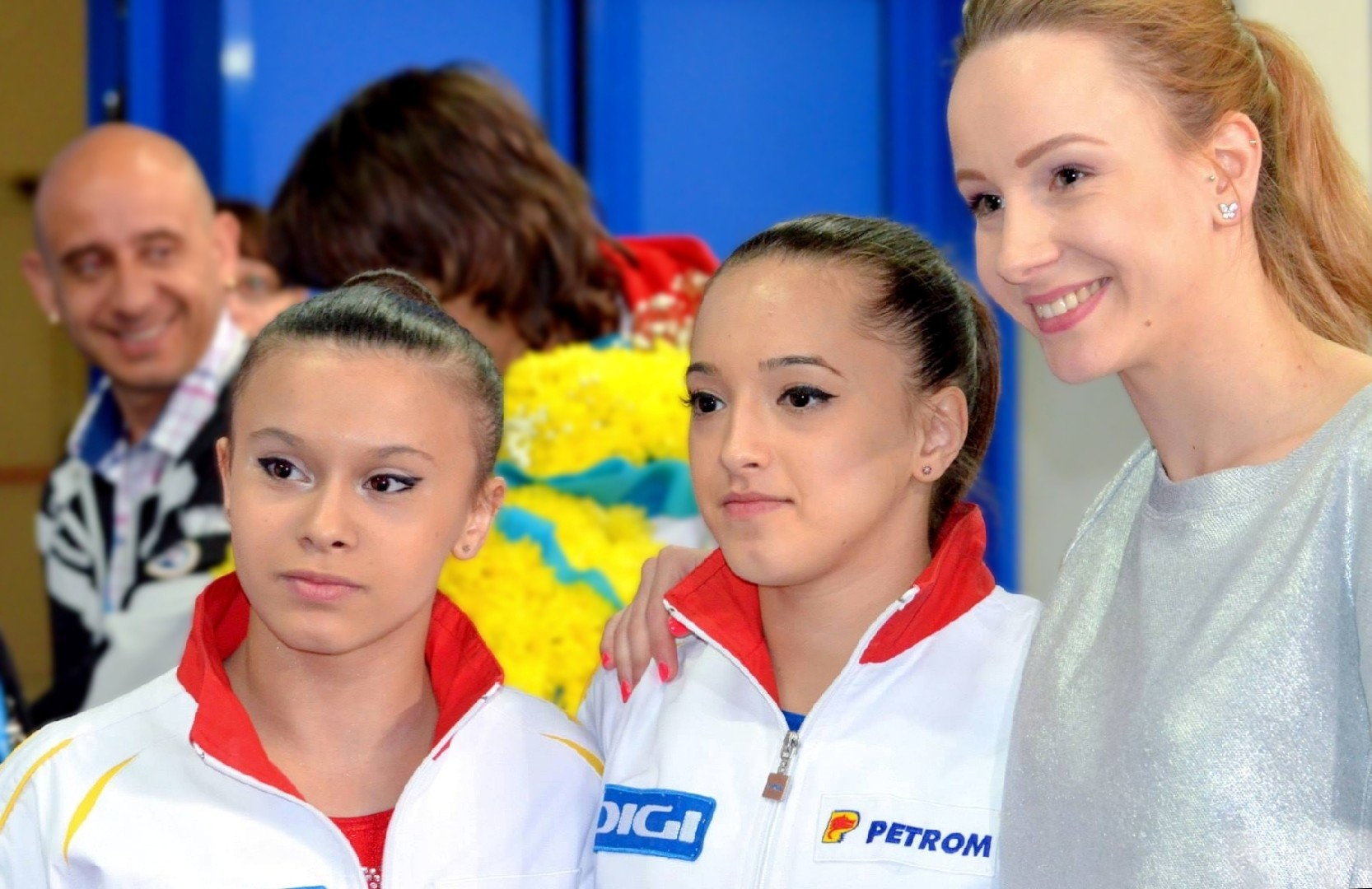
Bulimar (left) at the 2014 European Championships with Larisa Iordache (centre) and Sandra Izbașa (right)

Bulimar's first competition back was the Doha World Cup. She finished in fourth on beam with a 13.650, and she won silver on floor behind teammate Larisa Iordache with a 14.300. She competed at a friendly meet against Belgium and France where she won gold with the team and silver in the all-around.

Bulimar's last competition of the season was the European Championships. She contributed a 14.133 on bars, a 14.533 on beam, and a 14.225 on floor towards Romania's team gold medal. She qualified for the floor final where she tied with Marta Pihan-Kulesza for fourth. For the second year in a row, Bulimar had to miss Romanian Nationals and the World Championships due to a knee injury.

=== 2015 ===
Bulimar once again made her return at the Doha World Cup. She won a silver on bars with a 13.600 behind Youna Dufournet. She also won a bronze on beam with a 14.025 behind Phan Thị Hà Thanh and Giulia Steingruber.

In April she competed at the 2015 European Artistic Gymnastics Championships and placed 10th in the all-around.

In June, Bulimar underwent surgery on her right knee, causing her to miss the European Games. She returned to competition in September at a friendly meet between Romania and France where she helped her team to the gold medal, competing on bars and beam, and performing her floor routine on a tumble track to facilitate her recovery. At the Romanian Championships at the end of September, she won the bronze medal in the all-around competition along with a silver on the beam. She followed this with good results at the Novara Cup in Novara, Italy, where the Romanian team triumphed over Italy, Belgium and Spain, and Bulimar individually finished fourth and took the bronze medal on beam.

Bulimar was named to the Romanian team for the World Championships along with Larisa Iordache, Anamaria Ocolișan, Laura Jurca, Silvia Zarzu, and Cătălina Ponor. However, Ponor withdrew after having surgery, and alternate Andreea Iridon was put in. On the day before the qualification round, Ocolișan injured her ankle and could not compete. The Romanians were in the first subdivision of qualifications and had a very bad competition, qualifying in thirteenth place and failing to automatically qualify their team to the Olympic Games for the first time since 1966. Their performance was described as a meltdown as everyone except Jurca fell off the uneven bars and they had several falls off the balance beam. Diana fell twice on the uneven bars and finished individually in 56th place after qualifications with an all-around score of 52.591. Nadia Comăneci was interviewed after their performance, and she stated, "It's not the best year for them. I know they have a few girls that aren't of age who are in the plan for next year's Olympics. There's been a lot of accidents also. It wasn't very smooth for everybody and psychologically on top of that, Ocolisan's injury hit them hard." Bulimar and her teammates were seen crying afterwards.

In November Bulimar competed at the Arthur Gander Memorial in Morges, Switzerland, a competition in which each gymnast competes on only three pieces of apparatus. She chose to perform on the vault, beam and floor, and won the bronze medal behind teammate Larisa Iordache and Germany's Pauline Schäfer. She followed this with the Elite Gym Massilia meet in Marseille, France, where she performed cleanly to help team Romania to the bronze medal, along with winning the bronze all-around medal behind Russia's Angelina Melnikova and France's Marine Brevet, and winning the gold medal on the floor exercise.

=== 2016 ===
Bulimar competed at the Doha World Cup in March. She finished eighth on the uneven bars with a score of 11.925. In April, she competed in the Belgium Friendly. The Romanian team won silver behind Belgium. She won a bronze medal in the all-around with a score of 55.400. She tied for gold on the balance beam with Belgium's Axelle Klinckaert and Bulimar won gold on floor.

Bulimar was named to the team for the 2016 Olympic Test Event, Romania's last chance to qualify as a full team to the 2016 Olympics along with Cătălina Ponor, Anamaria Ocolișan, Laura Jurca, Silvia Zarzu, and Dora Vulcan. However, Jurca had to withdraw due an ankle injury and was replaced by Andreea Iridon, who also withdrew and was replaced by Maria Holbura. Romania competed in the first subdivision, and they finished seventh out of the eight teams. Bulimar only scored an 11.733 on the uneven bars because of a fall, and Romania had to count her score towards their total. Bulimar's all-around total was 53.940. In a press conference after the competition, Adrian Stoica, the president of the Romanian Gymnastics Federation, announced that the one individual spot Romania had at the Olympics would go to either Iordache or Ponor, leaving Bulimar out of contention.

In May, Bulimar ruptured her Achilles tendon while training floor exercise.

== Eponymous skill ==
Bulimar has one eponymous skill listed in the Code of Points.

Apparatus	Name	Description	Difficulty (Note: Valid for the 2025–2028 Code of Points)	Added to the Code of Points
Floor exercise	Bulimar	Switch leap with 1/4 with additional full turn	D (0.4)	2011 World Championships

== Competitive history ==
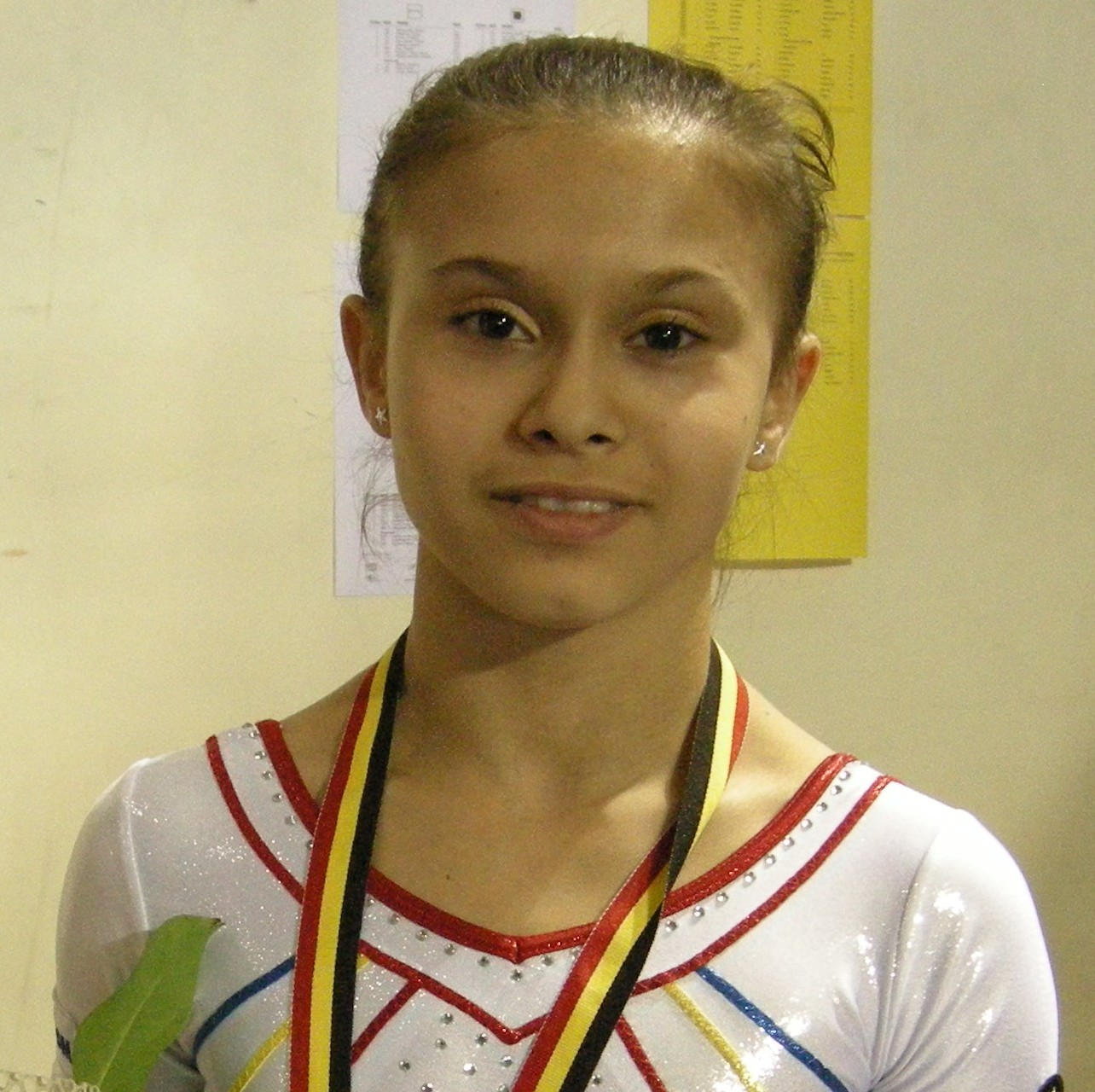
Bulimar at the 2012 Ghent World Cup

Year	Event	Team	AA	VT	UB	BB	FX
2010
2010	Junior European Championships	2nd place, silver medalist(s)	4		3rd place, bronze medalist(s)		4
2010	Youth Olympic Games		6	7	7		2nd place, silver medalist(s)
2010	National Championships		2nd place, silver medalist(s)				
2011	National Championships		4				3rd place, bronze medalist(s)
2011	SUI-GER-ROU Friendly	1st place, gold medalist(s)	3rd place, bronze medalist(s)				
2011	World Championships	4					WD
2012	Doha World Cup				5		2nd place, silver medalist(s)
2012	FRA-ROU Friendly	1st place, gold medalist(s)					
2012	GER-GBR-ROU Friendly	1st place, gold medalist(s)					
2012	European Championships	1st place, gold medalist(s)					
2012	Ghent World Cup					2nd place, silver medalist(s)	3rd place, bronze medalist(s)
2012	ROU-FRA-GER-ITA Friendly	1st place, gold medalist(s)					
2012	Olympic Games	3rd place, bronze medalist(s)				WD	
2013	La Roche-sur-Yon World Cup						2nd place, silver medalist(s)
2013	Doha World Cup				5	4	1st place, gold medalist(s)
2013	European Championships		4			2nd place, silver medalist(s)	3rd place, bronze medalist(s)
2013	Anadia World Cup					3rd place, bronze medalist(s)	1st place, gold medalist(s)
2013	Turnen Dames Interland		1st place, gold medalist(s)		3rd place, bronze medalist(s)	1st place, gold medalist(s)	1st place, gold medalist(s)
2014	Doha World Cup					4	2nd place, silver medalist(s)
2014	BEL-FRA-ROU Friendly	1st place, gold medalist(s)	2nd place, silver medalist(s)				
2014	European Championships	1st place, gold medalist(s)					4
2015	Doha World Cup				2nd place, silver medalist(s)	3rd place, bronze medalist(s)	
2015	European Championships		10				
2015	FRA-ROU Friendly	1st place, gold medalist(s)					
2015	National Championships	1st place, gold medalist(s)	3rd place, bronze medalist(s)			2nd place, silver medalist(s)	
2015	Novara Cup	1st place, gold medalist(s)	4				
2015	World Championships	13	56				
2015	Arthur Gander Memorial		3rd place, bronze medalist(s)				
2015	Elite Gym Massilia	3rd place, bronze medalist(s)	3rd place, bronze medalist(s)			5	1st place, gold medalist(s)
2016	Doha World Cup				8		2nd place, silver medalist(s)
2016	Belgium Friendly	2nd place, silver medalist(s)	3rd place, bronze medalist(s)			1st place, gold medalist(s)	1st place, gold medalist(s)
2016	Olympic Test Event	7	24				
