= Larisa Iordache =

Romanian artistic gymnast (born 1996)

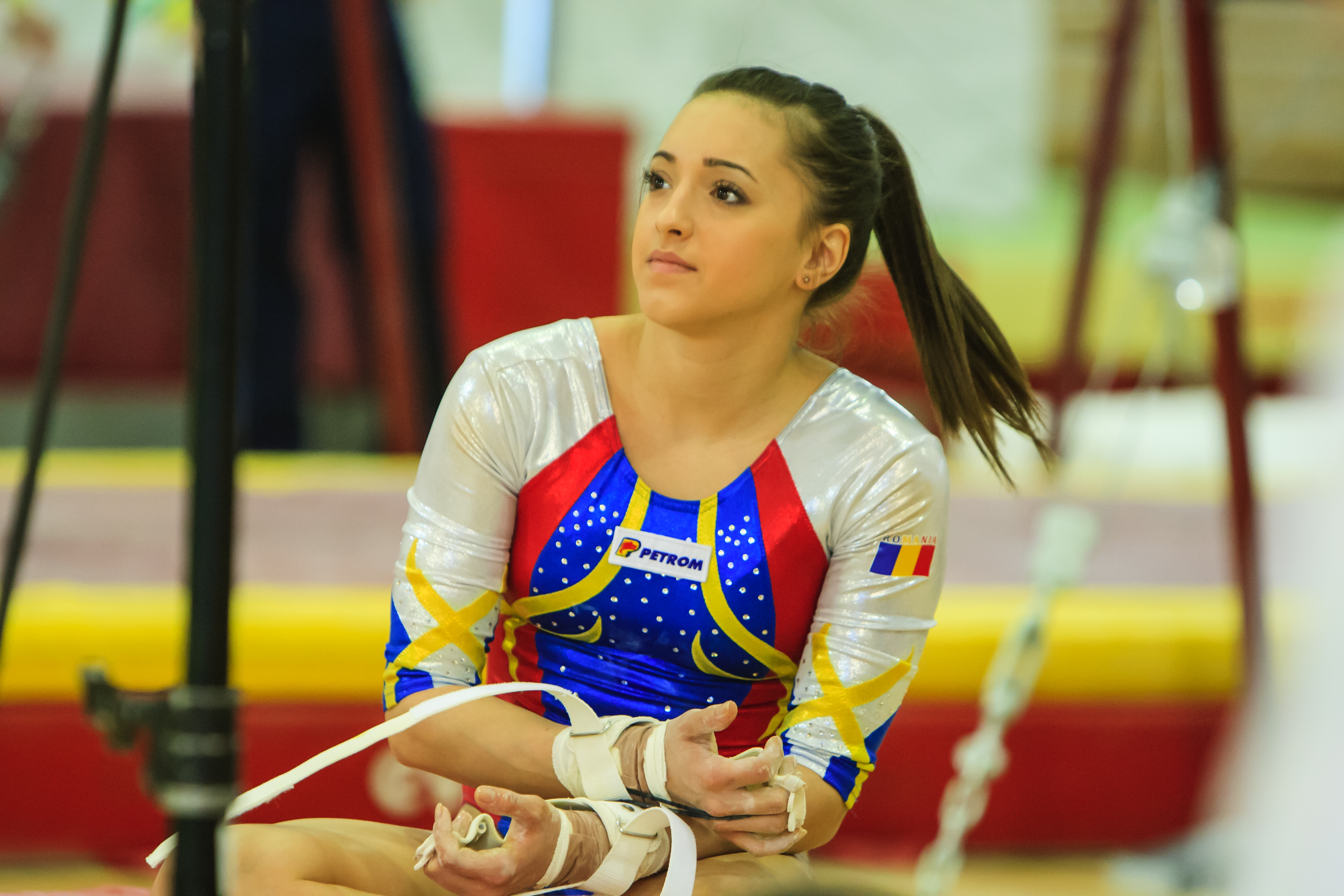
- Iordache in 2015

Personal information
- Full name: Larisa Andreea Iordache
- Nicknames: Lari, Pikachu, Piciul
- Born: 19 June 1996 (age 30) Bucharest, Romania

Gymnastics career
- Discipline: Women's artistic gymnastics
- Country represented: (2008–2021 (ROU))
- Club: CSS Dinamo
- Former coaches: Octavian Bellu, Mariana Bitang, Lacramioara Moldovan, Claudiu Moldovan, Gheorghe Orban, Ramona Micu, Adela Popa, Daniel Nistor, Aurica Nistor
- Choreographer: Corina Dorean
- Retired: 16 December 2021
- Awards: Shooting Star Award (2021)
Medal record
Event	1st	2nd	3rd
Olympic Games	0	0	1
World Championships	0	2	2
European Championships	7	7	2
Summer Universiade	2	0	1
Total	9	9	6
Representing Romania
Olympic Games
Bronze medal – third place	2012 London	Team
World Championships
Silver medal – second place	2014 Nanning	All-Around
Silver medal – second place	2014 Nanning	Floor Exercise
Bronze medal – third place	2013 Antwerp	Floor Exercise
Bronze medal – third place	2015 Glasgow	All-Around
European Championships
Gold medal – first place	2012 Brussels	Team
Gold medal – first place	2012 Brussels	Floor Exercise
Gold medal – first place	2013 Moscow	Balance Beam
Gold medal – first place	2014 Sofia	Team
Gold medal – first place	2014 Sofia	Floor Exercise
Gold medal – first place	2020 Mersin	Balance Beam
Gold medal – first place	2020 Mersin	Floor Exercise
Silver medal – second place	2012 Brussels	Balance Beam
Silver medal – second place	2013 Moscow	All-Around
Silver medal – second place	2013 Moscow	Vault
Silver medal – second place	2013 Moscow	Floor Exercise
Silver medal – second place	2014 Sofia	Balance Beam
Silver medal – second place	2020 Mersin	Team
Silver medal – second place	2020 Mersin	Vault
Bronze medal – third place	2014 Sofia	Vault
Bronze medal – third place	2017 Cluj-Napoca	Balance Beam
Summer Universiade
Gold medal – first place	2017 Taipei	All-Around
Gold medal – first place	2017 Taipei	Floor Exercise
Bronze medal – third place	2017 Taipei	Balance Beam
FIG World Cup
Event	1st	2nd	3rd
All-Around World Cup	3	1	1
Apparatus World Cup	4	2	0
World Challenge Cup	6	1	1
Total	13	4	2

Larisa Andreea Iordache (Romanian pronunciation: [laˈrisa anˈdree̯a jorˈdake]; born 19 June 1996) is a Romanian former artistic gymnast. She represented Romania at the 2012 Olympic Games, winning a bronze medal with the team, and at the 2020 Olympic Games.

The Romanian press referred to Iordache as "The New Nadia" as early as 2008, when she was 12, due to her skills and potential. In her first year of competition as a senior, Iordache won two gold medals at the 2012 European Championships, with her team and on floor exercise. She then won a bronze medal at the 2012 Summer Olympics in the team competition. Iordache is the 2013 World bronze medalist on floor exercise, the 2014 World silver medalist in the all-around and on floor exercise, and the 2015 World bronze medalist in the all-around.

Iordache was the 2013 European champion on beam, and the most successful gymnast at the 2014 European Championships, winning gold with her team and as an individual on floor exercise, silver on balance beam, and bronze on vault. She won bronze on beam at the 2017 European Championships, held in her home country in Cluj-Napoca. In 2020, she came back from a three-year break to win gold medals on balance beam and floor exercise at the 2020 European Championships, along with a silver with her team and as an individual on vault. Overall, Iordache has won sixteen medals at the European Championships, making her the second most decorated gymnast at the European level behind Svetlana Khorkina. She is also a twelve-time gold medalist in the World Cups and the 2017 Universiade champion in the all-around and on floor exercise.

== Early life ==
Iordache was born in Bucharest, Romania, where she still lives today. Her mother, Adriana Iordache, was a handball player, and her father played football. She has an older brother named Răzvan who also plays football. Iordache was introduced to gymnastics after being spotted rollerblading by her first coach, Mariana Câmpeanu-Silişteanu. Câmpeanu-Silişteanu asked Iordache's mother to put her into gymnastics classes, and although her mother was initially reluctant, Iordache began gymnastics at the age of five. When explaining how she began gymnastics, Iordache stated, "I think [Câmpeanu-Silişteanu] noticed the speed and the energy and that impressed her. I didn't choose gymnastics – it chose me. It just happened. I am very glad to have got so far." She also said that on her first day of training, she was too afraid to go into the gym, but after three days, she went into the gym and then she fell in love with gymnastics.

Iordache began her gymnastics training at CSS Dinamo Club in Bucharest. She became a member of the junior national team in 2008, and she was coached by Ramona Micu, Adela Popa, Lacramioara Moldovan, and Claudiu Moldovan. In 2008, she began receiving press attention in Romania comparing her to Nadia Comăneci, the 1976 Olympic all-around champion. Iordache later said of the comparison that "I feel honored to be compared to Nadia, but every gymnast has her own qualities and every gymnast is good enough on her own and doesn't have to be compared to anyone."

== Junior career ==
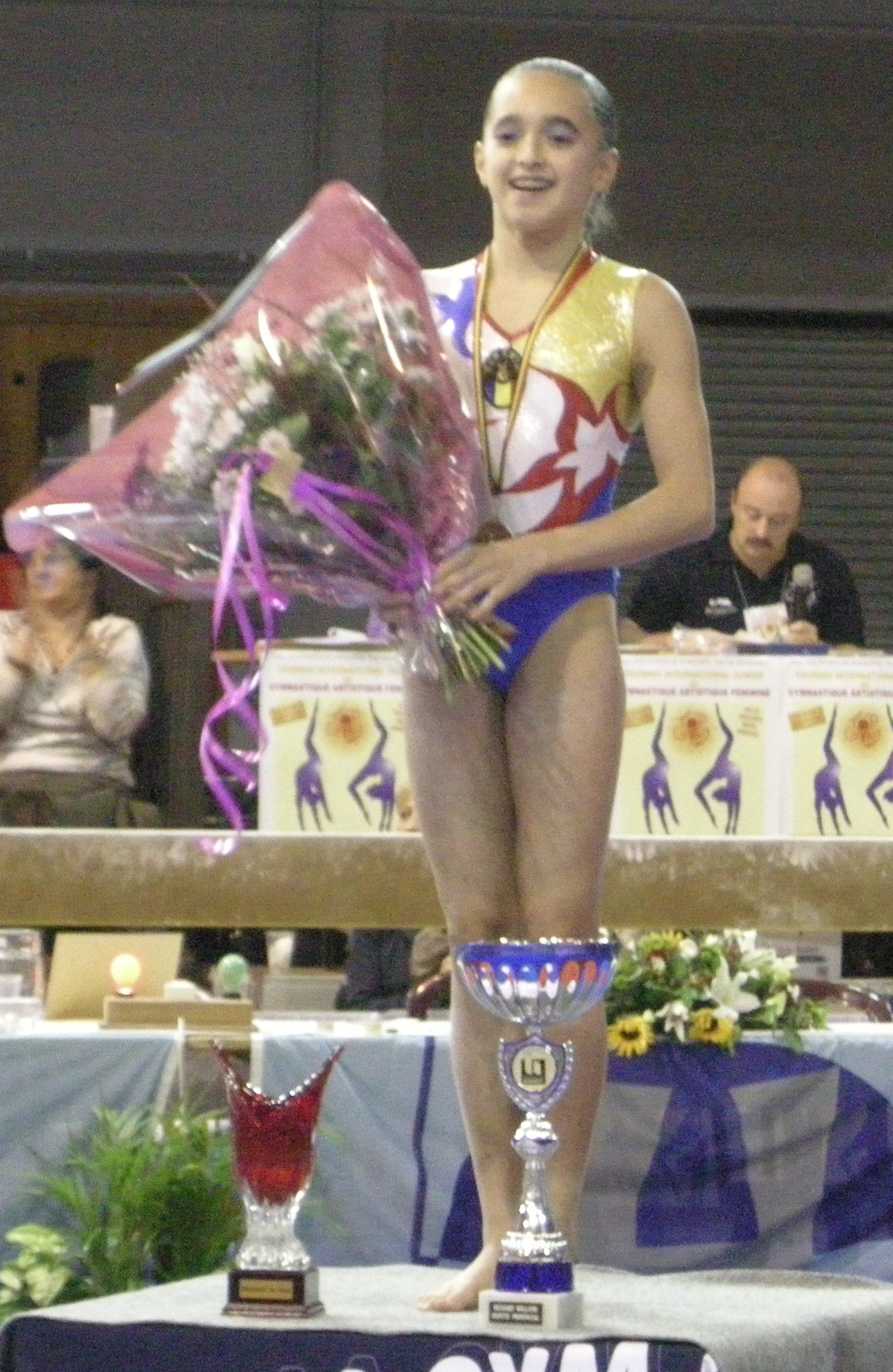
Iordache at the 2009 Top Gym Trophy

Iordache made her junior international debut at the 2009 Top Gym Trophy in Charleroi, Belgium. She won a bronze medal in the team event with Diana Bulimar and Slovenian gymnasts Rebeka Sarec and Tatjana Holeczek. Individually, she won a gold medal in the all-around and on the balance beam.

=== 2010 ===
Iordache's first major international competition was the European Championships in Birmingham, United Kingdom. She contributed an all-around score of 55.550 toward the Romanian team's second-place finish behind Russia. Iordache won the bronze medal in the all-around final behind Russians Viktoria Komova and Anastasia Grishina, with a score of 55.675. In the event finals, she placed fourth on vault, scoring 13.862, second on balance beam scoring 14.575, and tied first on floor with Anastasia Grishina, scoring 14.275.

In September, Iordache competed at the Romanian Championships in Reșița. She won the all around competition with a score of 58.400, nearly four points ahead of second-place teammate Diana Bulimar. Then in October, she competed at the Schiltigheim International in Schiltigheim, France. She won the all-around final with a score of 58.000. She placed second on vault behind France's Elodie Perez scoring 14.350, first on uneven bars, scoring 14.250, first on balance beam scoring 14.900, and first on floor scoring 14.500.

=== 2011 ===
In May, Iordache competed as a guest at the French Team Championships, held in Toulouse. She contributed an all-around score of 58.800 towards Alliance Dijon's first-place finish. The Alliance Dijon team included Iordache, Daniela Andrei, and Raluca Haidu from Romania, and French gymnasts Sophia Serseri, Laurie Antoniazzi, and Julie Roemer. Then in June, Iordache competed at the Gym Festival in Trnava, Slovakia, where 29 gymnasts from nine countries competed. She won the all-around final with a score of 59.500, and she finished nearly two points ahead of two-time Olympian Anna Pavlova. In the event finals, she placed first on uneven bars scoring 14.250, first on balance beam scoring 15.600, and first on floor exercise scoring 14.850. Later that month, she competed in an international meet against Great Britain in Lilleshall. The Romanian team finished in first, and they outscored the British on every event except the uneven bars. Iordache won the all-around title with a score of 58.300, nearly five points ahead of British silver medalist Gabby Jupp.

In July, Iordache competed at the 2011 European Youth Summer Olympic Festival in Trabzon, Turkey. She contributed an all around score of 57.800 towards the Romanian team's second-place finish behind Italy. Iordache won the all-around final with a score of 57.550, over two points ahead of the second-place finisher Erika Fasana. In the event finals, she placed second on vault scoring 14.225, second on uneven bars, scoring 13.475, first on balance beam, scoring 15.000, and first on floor exercise, scoring 14.275.

== Senior career ==
=== 2012 ===
Iordache became age eligible for senior international competition in 2012. At the beginning of March, Iordache competed at the American Cup in New York City, United States. She placed third in the all-around behind Americans Jordyn Wieber and Aly Raisman with a score of 59.332. Then at the end of March, she competed at the World Cup in Doha, Qatar. She placed fourth in the uneven bars final with a score of 14.525.

In April, Iordache competed at an international meet against France in Cholet, France. She helped Romania win the team competition, and individually, she won the all-around with a score of 60.150. Later that month, she competed at an international meet against Germany and the United Kingdom in Ulm, Germany. She helped Romania win the team competition, and individually, she won the all-around with a score of 59.750.

In May, Iordache competed at the 2012 European Championships in Brussels, Belgium. She contributed an all-around score of 58.757 toward the Romanian team's first-place finish. In the event finals, she placed second on the balance beam behind teammate Cătălina Ponor with a score of 15.133 and first on the floor exercise with a score of 15.233. At the beginning of July, she competed at an international meet against France, Germany, and Italy in her hometown, Bucharest. Romania won the team competition, and individually, she won the all-around with a score of 60.850.

==== London Olympics ====
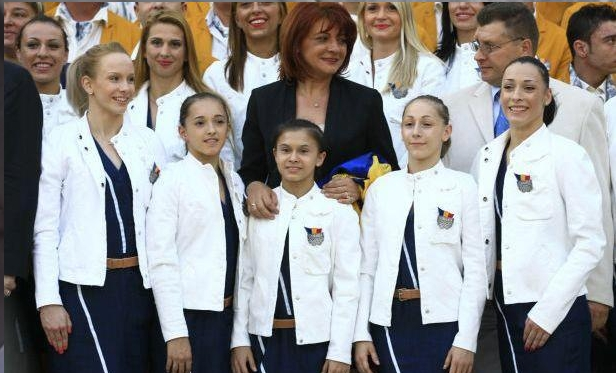
Iordache (second from the left) with the 2012 Romanian Olympic team

At the end of July, Iordache represented Romania at the 2012 Summer Olympics alongside teammates Diana Bulimar, Diana Chelaru, Sandra Izbașa, and Cătălina Ponor. Prior to the competition, she developed plantar fasciitis in her left foot, which caused severe pain. Her coach, Mariana Bitang said about Iordache's condition prior to the Olympics, "We don't know what will happen — it depends how things go after this. If she's fine, she will do all events to qualify to the all-around final. It's hard to say now." During podium training, Iordache only performed full routines on the uneven bars and the balance beam. Mariana Bitang explained that there was a 50–50 chance of whether she would be able to compete in all four events.

Iordache did compete in all four events in the qualification round, and she helped Romania finish fourth. Individually, she qualified for the all-around final in ninth place with a score of 57.800. In the team final, she contributed scores of 14.800 on vault, 13.766 on uneven bars, and 15.300 on balance beam toward the Romanian team's third-place finish behind Russia and the United States. After the team final, Iordache said on Romania's performance, "You always want to do better, but any Olympic medal is important for a team. We are happy." She placed ninth in the all around final with a score of 57.965 and sixth in the balance beam final with a score of 14.200. The Olympics were Iordache's last competition of the season.

=== 2013 ===
Iordache performing on the floor exercise during the all-around final at the 2013 World Championships on 4 October 2013

At the 2013 Doha World Cup, Iordache placed second in the vault final behind Phan Thị Hà Thanh with a score of 14.675, and seventh in the uneven bars final with a score of 13.325. She also placed first in the balance beam final ahead of Zeng Siqi and Gabrielle Jupp with a score of 15.500, and second in the floor exercise final behind Diana Bulimar with a score of 14.425.

At the 2013 European Championships in Moscow, Iordache qualified first into the all-around final and the balance beam final, second to the floor exercise final, and fourth to vault final. In the all-around final, she scored 14.833 on beam, 14.866 on floor exercise, 14.900 on vault, and 13.833 on uneven bars. She won the silver medal behind Aliya Mustafina of Russia. In the vault final, she tied with Dutch gymnast Noël van Klaveren for the silver medal with a score of 14.466. Additionally, she won the silver medal in the floor exercise final behind Russia's Ksenia Afanasyeva and the gold medal in the balance beam final. Then at the 2013 Anadia World Cup, Iordache won the gold medal on the balance beam and on the floor exercise.

In October, Iordache competed at the 2013 World Championships in Antwerp, Belgium. In the all-around final, she finished fourth due to a fall from the balance beam on a back handspring full twist. She fell on the same skill in the balance beam final and scored 13.933 for seventh place. Then, in the floor exercise final, she won the bronze medal behind American Simone Biles and Italian Vanessa Ferrari.

After the World Championships, Iordache competed at the Arthur Gander Memorial in Morges, Switzerland where she won the gold medal in the all-around. She then competed at the Swiss Cup, which is a team competition where each country is represented by one female and one male gymnast. With her teammate Andrei Muntean, Romania won the gold medal ahead of Germany, Switzerland, and Ukraine. She competed at the Elite Gym Massilia in Marseille, France where she won the gold medal in the all-around, the silver medal on vault behind Russia's Alla Sosnitskaya, and the gold medal on both balance beam and floor exercise. Then, she won the silver medal in the all-around at the Stuttgart World Cup behind American Elizabeth Price. Her last competition of the season was the Glasgow World Cup where she won the gold medal in the all-around.

=== 2014 ===
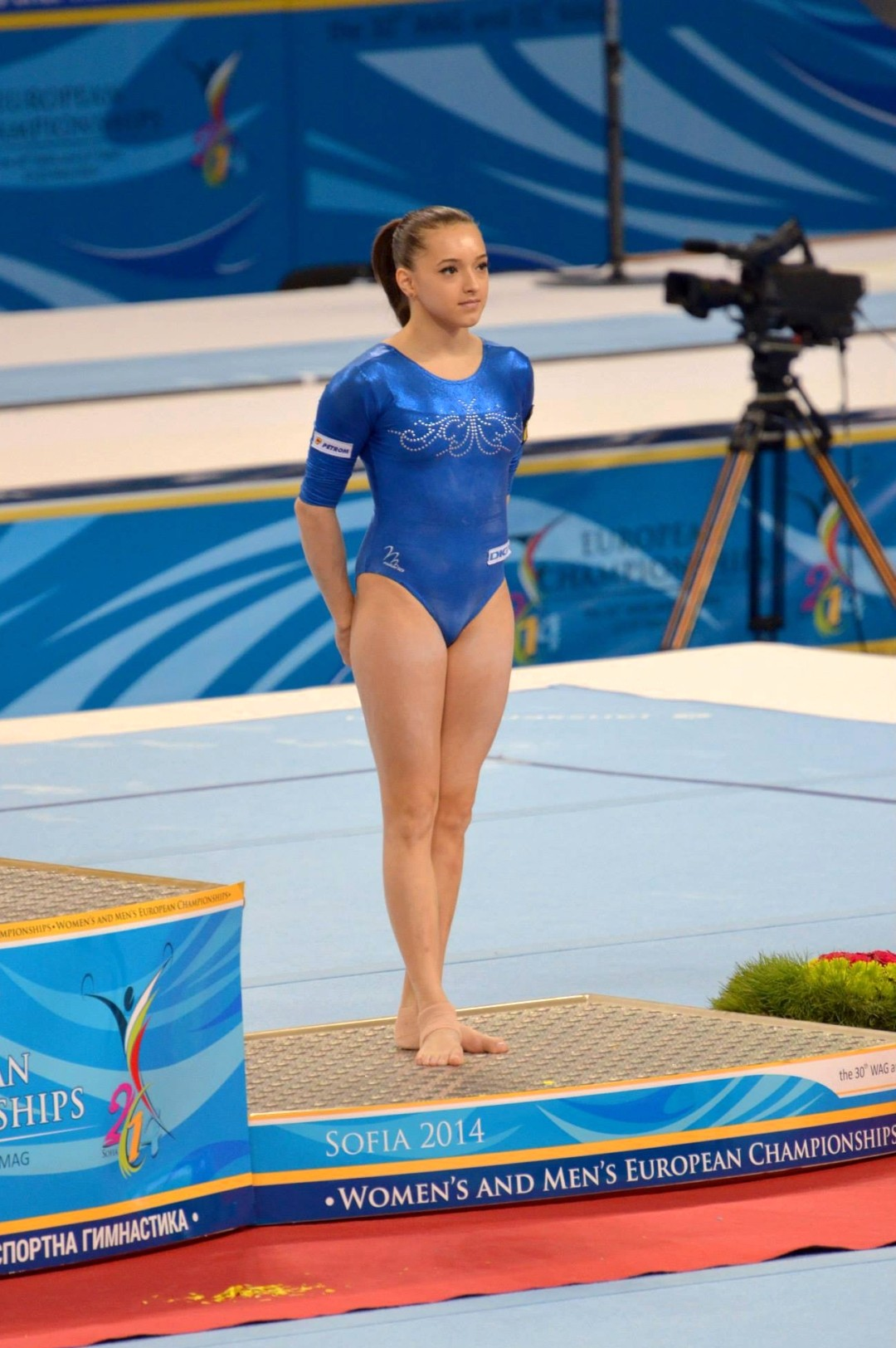
Iordache at the 2014 European Championships

In March, Iordache competed at the Doha World Cup where she won gold on vault, balance beam, and floor exercise. Then in April, she helped her team win gold at the France-Romania-Belgium Tri-Friendly meet. She had the highest scores of the competition on every apparatus, and she won the all-around title by three points over teammate Diana Bulimar.

At the 2014 European Championships, Iordache was the most decorated gymnast with four medals. She was the only gymnast to qualify for all four apparatus finals. Then in the team finals, the Romanian team of Iordache, Diana Bulimar, Andreea Munteanu, Ștefania Stănilă, and Silvia Zarzu won the gold medal. In the event finals, she won the bronze medal on vault, placed sixth on uneven bars, won the silver medal on balance beam behind Maria Kharenkova, and tied for the gold medal on floor exercise with Vanessa Ferrari.

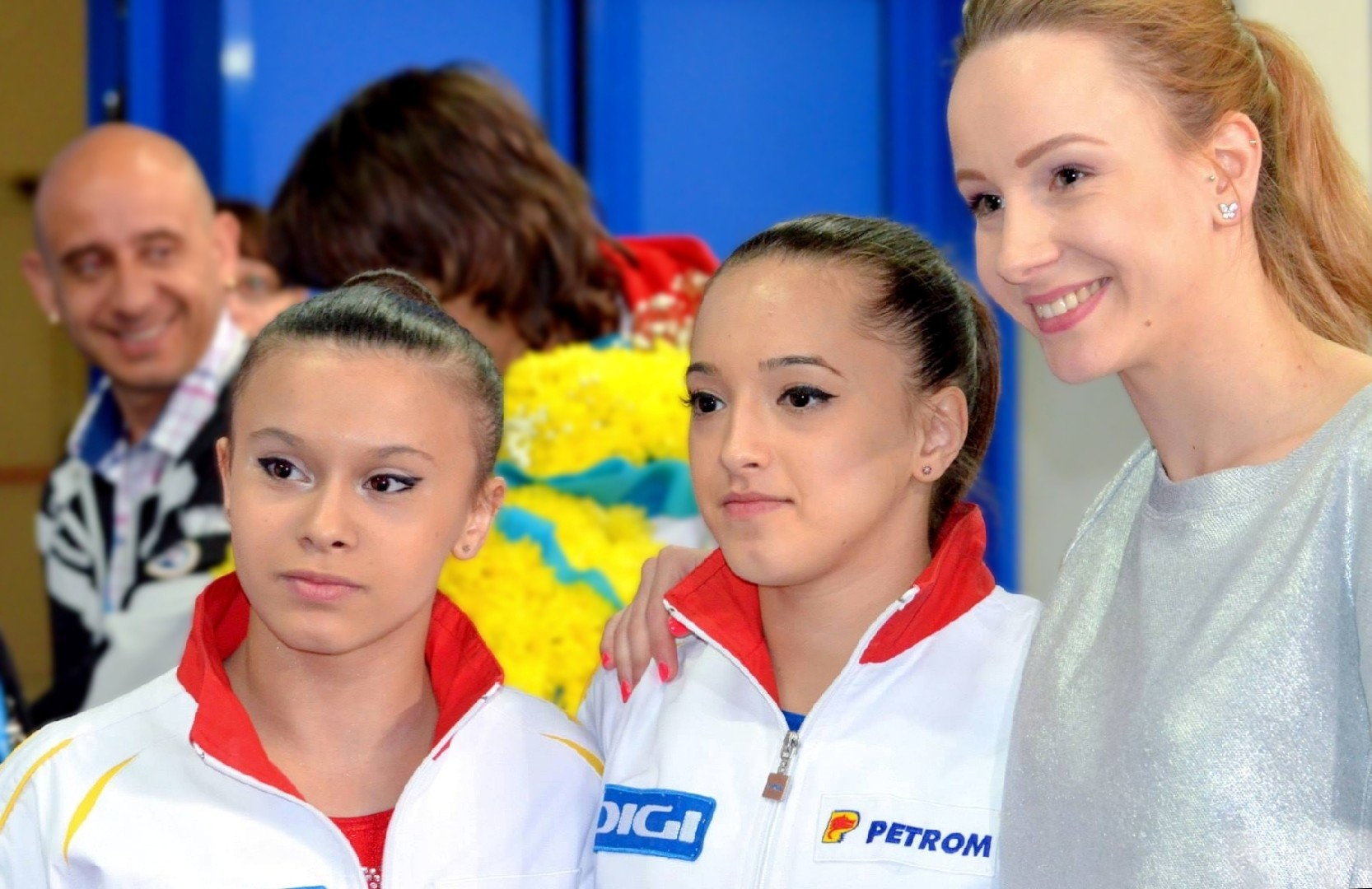
Iordache (center) with Diana Bulimar and Sandra Izbașa in 2014

The Romanian National Championships were held at the end of August, and Iordache won four of the five gold medals. She won the all-around competition with 59.650, beating second-place finisher Ștefania Stănilă by nearly four points. The only gold she did not win was on the balance beam, where Andreea Munteanu won gold and Iordache took silver. In September, she competed at the Switzerland-Germany-Romania Tri-Friendly meet in Obersiggenthal, Switzerland, and the Romanian team finished second behind Germany. She won the all-around competition, finishing nearly two points ahead of silver medalist Giulia Steingruber.

In October, Iordache was named to the Romanian team for the 2014 World Championships in Nanning, China. After the team finished seventh in the qualification round, she led the largely inexperienced Romanian team to a fourth-place finish. Individually, she won a silver medal in the all-around competition, behind Simone Biles and ahead of Kyla Ross. Afterwards, she said, "It is a good result. I am quite pleased with what I did today, but that does not mean I can not do even better. Everything is possible at any one competition. Today I did not get gold but next time there is always a chance." In the balance beam final, she fell on her back handspring tuck full series and finished fifth. Later that day, she won the silver medal in the floor exercise final behind Simone Biles. At the end of the World Championships, she said of her performance and her future,

After I lost on beam, it was so difficult for me to come back. It was fortunate that I came back well on floor, and I was happy to finally perform my routine without mistakes. I want to practice and practice so I can hit all of my elements and add difficulty. Time will tell if I am able to someday beat [Simone Biles]. It's hard to say what the future will bring. Next year is next year ... we will see then. But I will try my best.

After the World Championships, she competed at the Arthur Gander Memorial, placing second in the all-around behind Russian Daria Spiridonova. She then competed at the Swiss Cup with Marius Berbecar, and they placed seventh. She then competed in the Stuttgart and Glasgow World Cups. In Stuttgart, she won the all-around title with a score of 59.766 ahead of Jessica López and Kim Bùi. She received the highest score on every event except the uneven bars. In Glasgow, Iordache posted the highest score on every event to take home the all-around gold with 59.232. She finished nearly three points ahead of silver medalist Ellie Black.

=== 2015 ===
Iordache was scheduled to compete at the World Cups in Doha and Cottbus, but she withdrew due to an ankle injury. She later withdrew from the 2015 European Championships due to the same injury. She also had to skip the 2015 European Games due to school exams.

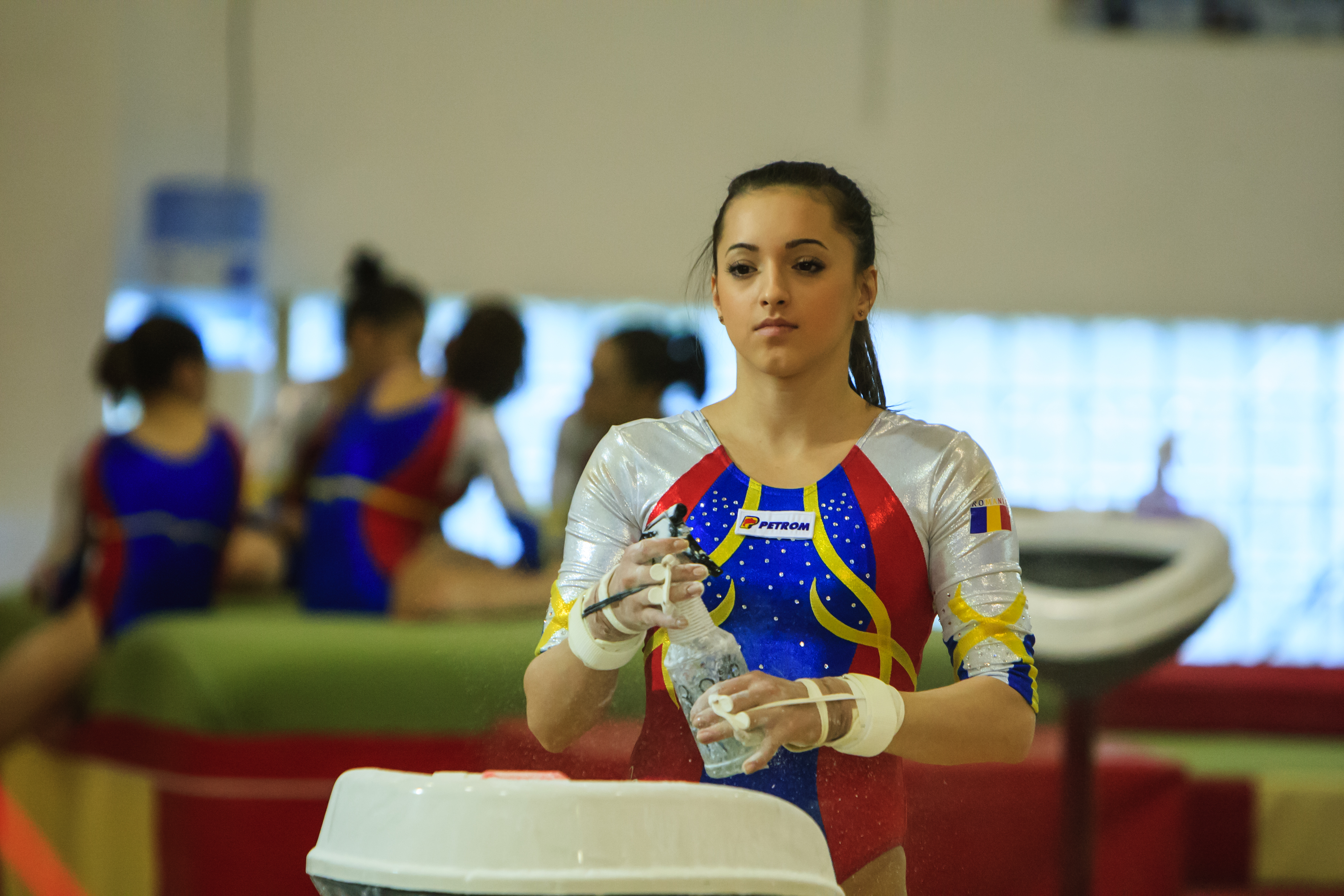
Iordache in 2015

Iordache returned to competition on 12 September at the Romania-France Friendly competition, winning the all-around gold with a total score of 58.150 and helping Romania to the team gold. At the Romanian National Championships, Iordache won gold with her club team and in the all-around with a score of 60.900. She also won gold on uneven bars, balance beam, and floor exercise. In October, Iordache competed at the Novara cup against Italy, Belgium, and Spain. The Romanian team of Iordache, Diana Bulimar, Ana Maria Ocolişan, Laura Jurca, Silvia Zarzu, and Andreea Iridon won the gold medal, and Iordache won the all-around with a 59.750.

Iordache was selected to compete at the 2015 World Championships along with Diana Bulimar, Ana Maria Ocolişan, Laura Jurca, Silvia Zarzu, and Cătălina Ponor. However, Ponor withdrew after having surgery, and the alternate Andreea Iridon was put in. On the day before the qualification round, Ocolisan injured her ankle and could not compete. In the qualification round, Iordache scored a disappointing 55.698 in the all-around after downgrading her floor routine and falling off the uneven bars and balance beam. The Romanian team finished in thirteenth place, meaning that they did not directly qualify for the 2016 Olympics. Their performance was described as a meltdown, as everyone except Jurca fell off the uneven bars and team members had several falls off the balance beam. Iordache and her teammates were seen crying afterwards. Iordache finished sixteenth all-around in the qualification round, but in the all-around final, she won the bronze medal, with a score of 59.107 behind Gabby Douglas and Simone Biles. After winning the bronze medal in the all-around she explained, "I feel much better now than Friday, but I want much more, all the time. It was so hard for me. But I have my coach, my parents, my girls and my team with me. Today was good for me. It was so good for me."

After the World Championships, Iordache competed at the Arthur Gander Memorial, where she won the all-around gold medal ahead of Pauline Schäfer from Germany and Romanian teammate Diana Bulimar. Then at the Swiss Cup, she competed with Marius Berbecar, and they won the silver medal behind Ukraine.

=== 2016 ===
In March, Iordache fractured her fourth metacarpal bone during balance beam training and had to have surgery. She missed the Olympic Test Event in April, and Romania failed to qualify a full team to the Olympics. In May, Iordache's injury required another operation, and Romanian newspapers began reporting that Cătălina Ponor would be sent to the Olympic Games instead of Iordache, but this was not initially confirmed by the Romanian Gymnastics Federation.

She returned to competition in July at the National Championships, and she competed despite suffering from a concussion during training. She won the gold medal in the all-around on the uneven bars, and the silver medal on the balance beam behind Ponor. She hurt her knee on the dismount of her uneven bars routine, and after competing in the balance beam final, she withdrew from the floor exercise final. Ponor was then named the Olympic flag-bearer for Romania, essentially confirming the Ponor would compete instead of Iordache despite the Romanian Gymnastics Federation stating that both of them would travel to Rio.

Iordache then competed at a friendly meet against France, and the Romanian team finished second. She tied for the silver medal in the all-around with Louise Vanhille. She then competed at a friendly meet in Chemnitz, Germany where she finished ninth in the all-around. Iordache was officially named the alternate for the Olympic Games. Following the Olympic Games, she confirmed that she would continue to compete.

=== 2017 ===
Iordache opened her season by competing at the Sainté Gym Cup in Saint-Étienne, France. She only competed on the uneven bars, where she won the gold medal, and the balance beam, where she won the silver medal. She was selected for the European Championships in Cluj-Napoca along with first-year seniors Olivia Cîmpian and Ioana Crișan, and London Olympic teammate Cătălina Ponor. She was not yet ready to compete in the all-around, competing only on uneven bars and balance beam, and she qualified first into balance beam finals. In the balance beam final, she won the bronze medal, with Ponor winning gold and Eythora Thorsdottir winning silver.

In May, Iordache competed at the World Cup held in Koper. She decided to perform only on the balance beam and uneven bars. Iordache won gold in both finals, with a score of 13.800 on the uneven bars and a 14.150 on the balance beam. She was then selected to represent Romania at the 2017 Summer Universiade. She competed in the all-around for the first time of the year, and she qualified for the all-around final in second place behind Ellie Black. In the all-around final, she won the gold medal with a total score of 56.750. In the event finals, she placed fifth on the uneven bars, won the bronze medal on the balance beam behind Black and Natsumi Sasada, and won the gold medal on the floor exercise.

Then at the Romanian Championships, Iordache won the gold medal in the all-around by five-and-a-half points over Denisa Golgotă. She also won the gold medal on uneven bars, balance beam, and floor exercise. She then competed at the Paris World Cup where she placed fourth on the uneven bars, won the gold on the balance beam, and won the silver on the floor exercise behind Claudia Fragapane.

In October, Iordache traveled to Montreal for the 2017 World Championships but suffered an Achilles tendon tear during the warm-ups for the qualification round. She then flew back to Romania and had surgery. She had a second surgery on her Achilles tendon a month and a half later.

=== 2018–2019 ===
In June 2018, Iordache told the Romanian media that her recovery has been going slowly and that there is a 50% chance of her returning to gymnastics. In September 2018, Larisa went to Dr. Weinstable in Vienna, Austria, with the help of former Romanian head coaches, Mariana Bitang and Octavian Bellu, to have her third surgery on her Achilles tendon. In January 2019, she had a final examination on her Achilles tendon by Dr. Weinstable in Vienna. She was told that she was able to begin training at full capacity, and Iordache officially announced her comeback to elite gymnastics.

=== 2020 ===
In late October 2020, Iordache reported on Twitter that she had tested positive for COVID-19, forcing her to forego a verification meet that would have been her first competition in three years. Her symptoms were mild. In November, Iordache made her comeback debut at the Romanian National Championships. She had the fourth-highest all-around score with a 52.234, just over half a point behind all-around bronze medalist Ioana Stănciulescu. However, because she was not competing for her club team and was instead competing as an individual, she was not allowed to be ranked. She still competed in the uneven bars and balance beam finals, and had she been eligible, she would have won gold on uneven bars and silver on balance beam. Shortly thereafter she was named to Romania's team for the 2020 European Championships.

At the European Championships, the Romanian team of Iordache, Antonia Duță, Silviana Sfiringu, Ioana Stănciulescu, and Daniela Trică won the silver medal behind Ukraine. Iordache won the silver medal on vault behind Hungary's Zsófia Kovács, and she placed fourth on uneven bars. Then, she won the gold medal on both balance beam and floor exercise.

=== 2021 ===
In April 2021, Iordache competed at the 2021 European Championships, which was her last chance to qualify for the 2020 Olympic Games in Tokyo. Despite waking up the morning of the competition with severe abdominal pain and being told by doctors to withdraw, Iordache competed in the qualification round. In the qualification round, she placed fourth in the all-around with a score of 54.698 behind Russians Angelina Melnikova, Viktoria Listunova, and Vladislava Urazova. Because Russia could only earn one Olympic spot at the European Championships, Iordache qualified a nominative spot for the Olympics. She also qualified in first place to the balance beam final, despite a fall, and sixth place in the floor exercise final. She later withdrew from the all-around and event finals due to a kidney infection that required hospitalization. She had to take two weeks off of training once she was released from the hospital. At the end of the European Championships, Iordache was presented with the Shooting Star award from the event's sponsor, SmartScoring, alongside Ireland's Rhys McClenaghan. The award is given to a female and a male gymnast who have an exceptional story and are inspirations for future gymnasts.

Iordache competed at the Cairo World Challenge Cup in June where she won the gold medal on the balance beam and the bronze medal on the uneven bars behind Diana Varinska and Zója Székely. She was originally going to compete at the FIT Challenge in Ghent; however, she withdrew from the competition after her mother died from a long-term illness.

==== Tokyo Olympics ====
Iordache qualified to represent Romania at the 2020 Summer Olympics alongside her teammate Maria Holbură. On 21 July, it was announced that she would only compete on the balance beam due to an ankle injury. She qualified to the balance beam final in fourth place, behind American Sunisa Lee and Chinese gymnasts Tang Xijing and Guan Chenchen. However, she withdrew from the final due to her ankle injury.

In December, Iordache traveled to Vienna to have surgery on her ankle. On 16 December, she announced her retirement from gymnastics on her Instagram account.

== Competitive history ==
Competitive history of Larisa Iordache at the junior level
Year	Event	Team	AA	VT	UB	BB	FX
2009	Top Gym Trophy	3rd place, bronze medalist(s)	1st place, gold medalist(s)		7	1st place, gold medalist(s)	
2010
2010	Junior European Championships	2nd place, silver medalist(s)	3rd place, bronze medalist(s)			2nd place, silver medalist(s)	1st place, gold medalist(s)
2010	Romanian Championships		1st place, gold medalist(s)				
2010	Schiltigheim International		1st place, gold medalist(s)	2nd place, silver medalist(s)	1st place, gold medalist(s)	1st place, gold medalist(s)	1st place, gold medalist(s)
2011	French Championships	1st place, gold medalist(s)					
2011	Gym Festival		1st place, gold medalist(s)				
2011	ROU-GBR Friendly		1st place, gold medalist(s)				
2011	European Youth Olympic Festival	2nd place, silver medalist(s)	1st place, gold medalist(s)	2nd place, silver medalist(s)	2nd place, silver medalist(s)	1st place, gold medalist(s)	1st place, gold medalist(s)

Competitive history of Larisa Iordache at the senior level
Year	Event	Team	AA	VT	UB	BB	FX
2012	American Cup		3rd place, bronze medalist(s)				
2012	Doha World Challenge Cup				4		
2012	FRA-ROU Friendly	1st place, gold medalist(s)	1st place, gold medalist(s)				
2012	GER-GBR-ROU Friendly	1st place, gold medalist(s)	1st place, gold medalist(s)				
2012	European Championships	1st place, gold medalist(s)				2nd place, silver medalist(s)	1st place, gold medalist(s)
2012	FRA-GER-ITA-ROU Friendly	1st place, gold medalist(s)	1st place, gold medalist(s)				
2012	Olympic Games	3rd place, bronze medalist(s)	9			6	
2013	Doha World Challenge Cup			2nd place, silver medalist(s)	7	1st place, gold medalist(s)	2nd place, silver medalist(s)
2013	European Championships		2nd place, silver medalist(s)	2nd place, silver medalist(s)		1st place, gold medalist(s)	2nd place, silver medalist(s)
2013	Anadia World Challenge Cup					1st place, gold medalist(s)	1st place, gold medalist(s)
2013	World Championships		4			7	3rd place, bronze medalist(s)
2013	Arthur Gander Memorial		1st place, gold medalist(s)				
2013	Swiss Cup	1st place, gold medalist(s)					
2013	Elite Gym Massilia		1st place, gold medalist(s)	2nd place, silver medalist(s)		1st place, gold medalist(s)	1st place, gold medalist(s)
2013	Stuttgart World Cup		2nd place, silver medalist(s)				
2013	Glasgow World Cup		1st place, gold medalist(s)				
2014	Doha World Challenge Cup			1st place, gold medalist(s)		1st place, gold medalist(s)	1st place, gold medalist(s)
2014	BEL-FRA-ROU Friendly	1st place, gold medalist(s)	1st place, gold medalist(s)				
2014	European Championships	1st place, gold medalist(s)		3rd place, bronze medalist(s)	6	2nd place, silver medalist(s)	1st place, gold medalist(s)
2014	Romanian Championships		1st place, gold medalist(s)	1st place, gold medalist(s)	1st place, gold medalist(s)	2nd place, silver medalist(s)	1st place, gold medalist(s)
2014	SUI-GER-ROU Friendly	2nd place, silver medalist(s)	1st place, gold medalist(s)	1st place, gold medalist(s)	3rd place, bronze medalist(s)	1st place, gold medalist(s)	1st place, gold medalist(s)
2014	World Championships	4	2nd place, silver medalist(s)			5	2nd place, silver medalist(s)
2014	Arthur Gander Memorial		2nd place, silver medalist(s)				
2014	Swiss Cup	7					
2014	Stuttgart World Cup		1st place, gold medalist(s)				
2014	Glasgow World Cup		1st place, gold medalist(s)				
2015	FRA-ROU Friendly	1st place, gold medalist(s)	1st place, gold medalist(s)				
2015	Romanian Championships	1st place, gold medalist(s)	1st place, gold medalist(s)		1st place, gold medalist(s)	1st place, gold medalist(s)	1st place, gold medalist(s)
2015	Novara Cup	1st place, gold medalist(s)	1st place, gold medalist(s)				
2015	World Championships		3rd place, bronze medalist(s)				
2015	Arthur Gander Memorial		1st place, gold medalist(s)				
2015	Swiss Cup	2nd place, silver medalist(s)					
2016	Romanian Championships		1st place, gold medalist(s)		1st place, gold medalist(s)	2nd place, silver medalist(s)	
2016	FRA-ROU Friendly	2nd place, silver medalist(s)	2nd place, silver medalist(s)				
2016	Chemnitz Friendly	3rd place, bronze medalist(s)	9				
2017
2017	European Championships					3rd place, bronze medalist(s)	
2017	Koper World Challenge Cup				1st place, gold medalist(s)	1st place, gold medalist(s)	
2017	French Championships	1st place, gold medalist(s)					
2017	Summer Universiade		1st place, gold medalist(s)		5	3rd place, bronze medalist(s)	1st place, gold medalist(s)
2017	Romanian Championships	2nd place, silver medalist(s)	1st place, gold medalist(s)		1st place, gold medalist(s)	1st place, gold medalist(s)	1st place, gold medalist(s)
2017	Paris World Challenge Cup				4	1st place, gold medalist(s)	2nd place, silver medalist(s)
2018	Did not compete						
2019	Did not compete						
2020
2020	European Championships	2nd place, silver medalist(s)		2nd place, silver medalist(s)	4	1st place, gold medalist(s)	1st place, gold medalist(s)
2021
2021	European Championships		WD			WD	WD
2021	Cairo World Challenge Cup				3rd place, bronze medalist(s)	1st place, gold medalist(s)	
2021	Olympic Games					WD	

== See also ==
- List of Olympic female gymnasts for Romania
