= Anamaria Ocolișan =

Romanian artistic gymnast

- Born: 10 December 1997 (age 28) Petroșani, Romania

Gymnastics career
- Discipline: Women's artistic gymnastics
- Country represented: Romania
Medal record
Representing Romania
FIG World Cup
Bronze medal – third place	2018 Osijek	Floor Exercise

Anamaria Ocolișan (born 10 December 1997) is a Romanian artistic gymnast. She was part of her country's team at the 2014 World Artistic Gymnastics Championships, competing in the team event where Romania placed fourth.

== Senior career ==
=== 2014 ===
Ocolisan competed at the National Championships where she placed 7th in the all-around, 3rd on vault and 3rd on the uneven bars. She also competed at a friendly meet between Switzerland, Germany and Romania where she placed 2nd with the Romanian team, 2nd on vault, 12th on the uneven bars and 8th on beam.

She was part of the Romanian team at the 2014 World Artistic Gymnastics Championships who placed 4th in the team final.

She also competed at the Joaquim Blume Memorial and placed 10th in the all-around.

=== 2015 ===
Ocolisan competed at Trofeo Torino 4 Nazioni and placed 3rd with the team and 10th in the all-around.

In September she competed in a friendly meet between Romania and France and placed first with the team and second in the all-around behind Larisa Iordache. She also placed 1st on vault with 15.000 (tied with Larisa Iordache) and 3rd on uneven bars with 14.050.

Ocolisan was named to the Romanian team that would represent the country at the 2015 World Artistic Gymnastics Championships in Glasgow, Scotland. However, an ankle injury during a training session at the event rendered her unable to participate in the competition.

== Competitive history ==
Year	Event	Team	AA	VT	UB	BB	FX
2011	Nadia Comaneci International Invitational	2nd	3rd				
2011	ROU-GBR Friendly	1st					
2012	Junior National Championships		2nd				
2012	Top Gym				3rd		
2012	Tournoi Internationale de Gymnastique D'Arques	5th	6th	5th		5th	4th
2013	National Championships	4th	7th	1st		7th	
2013	Élite Gym Massilia	1st	9th	5th			
2014	National Championships		7th	3rd	3rd		
2014	SUI-GER-ROU Friendly	2nd		2nd	12th	8th	
2014	World Championships	4th					
2014	Joaquim Blume Memorial		10th				
2015	Trofeo Torino 4 Nazioni	3rd	10th				
2015	FRA-ROU Friendly	1st	2nd				
2015	National Championships	2nd	2nd		5th	3rd	4th
2015	Novara Cup	1st	9th				
2016	European Championships	6th					
2018	Osijek Challenge Cup						3rd
