= 2014 in artistic gymnastics =

Below is a list of notable artistic gymnastics events scheduled to be held in 2014, as well as the WAG medalists at each event.

== Calendar of events ==
Date	Location	Event	Winner(s)
6–9 February	(Canada) Gatineau	Elite Canada	Senior AA: Victoria Moors; Senior VT: Maegan Chant; Senior UB: Natalie Vaculik; Senior BB: Ellie Black; Senior FX: Aleeza Yu; Junior AA: Rose-Kaying Woo; Junior VT: Shallon Olsen; Junior UB: Rose-Kaying Woo; Junior BB: Rose-Kaying Woo; Junior FX: Shallon Olsen
8–9 February	(United States) Frisco, Texas	WOGA Classic	TF: (United States) WOGA; Senior AA: (Brazil) Letícia Costa; Senior VT: (Japan) Mizuho Nagai; Senior UB: (United States) Madison Kocian; Senior BB: (United States) Alyssa Baumann; Senior FX: (Brazil) Letícia Costa; Junior AA: (Brazil) Rebeca Andrade; Junior VT: (Brazil) Rebeca Andrade; Junior UB: (Brazil) Rebeca Andrade; Junior BB: (Brazil) Flávia Saraiva; Junior FX: (United Kingdom) Amy Tinkler
21–23 February	(United States) Oklahoma City	Nadia Comăneci Invitational	TF: Australia; Senior AA: Georgia Godwin; Junior AA: (Russia) Irina Alexeeva
22–23 February	(United States) Los Angeles	All Olympia Legends International	Senior AA: (Switzerland) Ilaria Käslin; Junior AA: (Canada) Audrey Rousseau
22–23 February	(Scotland) Perth	Scottish National Championships	Senior AA: Emma White; Senior VT: Emma White; Senior UB: Emma White; Senior BB: Erin McLachlan; Senior FX: Carly Smith; Junior AA: Izzy Tolometti; Junior VT: Sofija Ignatova; Junior UB: Sofia Ramzan; Junior BB: Izzy Tolometti; Junior FX: Izzy Tolometti; Espoir AA: Louise McColgan; Espoir VT: Louise McColgan; Espoir UB: Louise McColgan; Espoir BB: Louise McColgan; Espoir FX: Louise McColgan
28 February	(United States) Greensboro, North Carolina	Nastia Liukin Cup	Senior AA: Mackenzie Brannan (Capital, Texas) & McKenna Kelley (Stars Houston, Texas); Junior AA: Rachael Flam (Stars Houston, Texas) & Lauren Ramirez (gold medal, Arizona)
1 March	(United States) Greensboro, North Carolina	AT&T American Cup	Men: (United States) Sam Mikulak; Women: (United States) Elizabeth Price
1–2 March	(Wales) Cardiff	Welsh National Championships	Open Senior AA: (England) Hannah Whelan; National Senior AA: Raer Theaker; Senior VT: Jessica Hogg; Senior UB: Rebecca Moore; Senior BB: Georgina Hockenhull; Senior FX: Raer Theaker; Open Junior AA: (England) April Maslen; National Junior AA: Rhyannon Jones; Junior VT: Rhyannon Jones; Junior UB: Rhyannon Jones; Junior BB: Rhyannon Jones; Junior FX: Sasha Winton; Open Espoir AA: (Wales) Latalia Bevan; National Espoir AA: Latalia Bevan; Espoir VT: Maisie Methuen; Espoir UB: Latalia Bevan; Espoir BB: Latalia Bevan; Espoir FX: Latalia Bevan
6–9 March	(Canada) Montreal	2014 L'International Gymnix	Challenge Cup: (Canada) Ellie Black; Junior Cup TF: Russia; Junior Cup AA: (Canada) Rose-Kaying Woo; Junior Cup VT: (Canada) Shallon Olsen; Junior Cup UB: Daria Skrypnik; Junior Cup BB: (Canada) Rose-Kaying Woo; Junior Cup FX: (Canada) Rose-Kaying Woo
7–18 March	(Chile) Santiago	2014 South American Games	TF: Brazil; AA: Jade Barbosa; VT: Jade Barbosa; UB: (Colombia) Bibiana Velez; BB: (Chile) Simona Castro; FX: Daniele Hypólito
13–16 March	(Germany) Cottbus	Cottbus World Cup	VT: (Germany) Janine Berger; UB: (Germany) Sophie Scheder; BB: (Hungary) Noémi Makra; FX: (Poland) Marta Pihan-Kulesza
14–16 March	(England) Wigan	English Championships	Senior AA: Ruby Harrold; Senior VT: Claudia Fragapane; Senior UB: Ruby Harrold; Senior BB: Becky Downie; Senior FX: Kelly Simm; Junior AA: Tyesha Mattis; Junior VT: Tyesha Mattis; Junior UB: Georgia Mae Fenton; Junior BB: Catherine Lyons; Junior FX: Catherine Lyons & Amy Tinkler; Espoir AA: Lucy Stanhope; Espoir VT: Elise Waugh; Espoir UB: Alice Kinsella; Espoir BB: Lana Chilton; Espoir FX: Maisie Lloyd Jones
22–23 March	(Italy) Jesolo	City of Jesolo Trophy	Senior TF: United States; Senior AA: Kyla Ross; Senior VT: Mykayla Skinner; Senior UB: Madison Kocian; Senior BB: (Romania) Andreea Munteanu; Senior FX: Mykayla Skinner; Junior TF: United States; Junior AA: Bailie Key; Junior VT: Bailie Key; Junior UB: Bailie Key; Junior BB: Norah Flatley; Junior FX: Bailie Key
24 March – 1 April	(South Africa) Pretoria	African Gymnastics Championships	Senior TF: South Africa; Senior AA: Kirsten Beckett; Senior VT: Fadwa Mahmoud; Senior UB: Kirsten Beckett; Senior BB: Farida Shokry; Senior FX: Kirsten Beckett; Junior TF: Egypt; Junior AA: Nada Ayman Ibrahir; Junior VT: Nada Ayman Ibrahir; Junior UB: Mammule Rankoe; Junior BB: Farida Nassa; Junior FX: Nada Ayman Ibrahir
26–28 March	(Qatar) Doha	Doha World Cup	VT: (Romania) Larisa Iordache; UB: (Czech Republic) Kristýna Pálešová; BB: (Romania) Larisa Iordache; FX: (Romania) Larisa Iordache
26–30 March	(Brazil) Aracaju	Junior Pan American Championships	TF: Canada; AA: (Brazil) Flávia Saraiva; VT: (Brazil) Rebeca Andrade; UB: (Brazil) Rebeca Andrade & Rose-Kaying Woo; BB: (Brazil) Rebeca Andrade; FX: (Brazil) Flávia Saraiva
28–30 March	(United Kingdom) Liverpool	British National Championships	Senior AA: Rebecca Tunney; Senior VT: Kelly Simm; Senior UB: Rebecca Tunney; Senior BB: Becky Downie; Senior FX: Elizabeth Beddoe; Junior AA: Amy Tinkler; Junior VT: Tyesha Mattis; Junior UB: Tyesha Mattis; Junior BB: Teal Grindle; Junior FX: Catherine Lyons & Amy Tinkler
31 March – 6 April	(Russia) Penza	Russian National Championships	Senior AA: Aliya Mustafina; Senior VT: Alla Sosnitskaya; Senior UB: Daria Spiridonova; Senior BB: Maria Kharenkova; Senior FX: Polina Fedorova; Junior (MS) AA: Angelina Melnikova; Junior (MS) VT: Seda Tutkhalyan; Junior (MS) UB: Daria Skrypnik; Junior (MS) BB: Angelina Melnikova; Junior (MS) FX: Angelina Melnikova; Junior (CMS) AA: Elena Eremina; Junior (CMS) VT: Elena Eremina; Junior (CMS) UB: Elena Eremina; Junior (CMS) BB: Ekaterina Sokova; Junior (CMS) FX: Elena Likhodolskaya
5–6 April	(Belgium) Mechelen	Belgian National Championships	National Senior AA: Lisa Vershueren; Interland TF: Sweden; Interland AA: Jonna Adlerteg
5–6 April	(Japan) Tokyo	Tokyo World Cup	AA: (Italy) Vanessa Ferrari
5–6 April	(France) Boé	French National Championships	Senior AA: Youna Dufournet; Junior AA: Loan His; VT: Coline Devillard; UB: Youna Dufournet; BB: Youna Dufournet; FX: Anne Kuhm
9–12 April	(Canada) Richmond	Pacific Rim Championships	TF: United States; Senior AA: Elizabeth Price; Senior VT: (Canada) Ellie Black; Senior UB: Elizabeth Price; Senior BB: Kyla Ross; Senior FX: Elizabeth Price; Junior AA: Bailie Key; Junior VT: Bailie Key; Junior UB: (China) Luo Huan; Junior BB: Norah Flatley; Junior FX: Bailie Key
10–14 April	(Uzbekistan) Tashkent	Junior Asian Championships	TF: Japan; AA: (China) Wang Yan; VT: Sae Miyakawa; UB: (China) Zhu Xiaofang; BB: (Uzbekistan) Turdikhon Islomova; FX: Sae Miyakawa
12 April	(Germany) Munich	Munich Friendly	Senior TF: (United Kingdom) Great Britain; Senior AA: (Spain) Roxana Popa; Junior TF: (Germany); Junior AA: (Germany) Tabea Alt
18–20 April	(Slovenia) Ljubljana	Ljubljana World Cup	VT: (Slovenia) Teja Belak; UB: (Azerbaijan) Anna Pavlova; BB: (Slovenia) Teja Belak; FX: (Argentina) Ayelen Tarabini & (Slovenia) Saša Golob
19 April	(France) Véron	BEL-FRA-ROU Friendly	Senior TF: Romania; Senior AA: Larisa Iordache; Junior TF: Romania; Junior AA: Andreea Iridon
19–20 April	(South Korea) Incheon	Korea Cup	VT: (Vietnam) Phan Thị Hà Thanh; UB: (Czech Republic) Kristýna Pálešová; BB: (Greece) Vasiliki Millousi; FX: (Poland) Paula Plichtai
25–27 April	(Croatia) Osijek	Osijek World Cup	VT: (Vietnam) Phan Thị Hà Thanh; UB: (North Korea) Kang Yong Mi; BB: (Vietnam) Phan Thị Hà Thanh; FX: (Switzerland) Giulia Steingruber
3 May	(Spain) Guadalajara	Spanish Cup	TF: Roxana Popa, Melania Rodriguez, & Marta Costa; AA: Roxana Popa; VT: Roxana Popa; UB: Roxana Popa; BB: Cintia Rodriguez; FX: Roxana Popa
9–13 May	(China) Nanning	Chinese National Championships	AA: Yao Jinnan; VT: Wang Yan; UB: Yao Jinnan; BB: Shang Chunsong; FX: Shang Chunsong
10–11 May	(Japan) Tokyo	Japanese National Championships (AA)	Natsumi Sasada
12–18 May	(Bulgaria) Sofia	2014 European Women's Artistic Gymnastics Championships	Senior TF: Romania; Senior VT: (Switzerland) Giulia Steingruber; Senior UB: (United Kingdom) Becky Downie; Senior BB: Maria Kharenkova; Senior FX: (Italy) Vanessa Ferrari & Larisa Iordache; Junior TF: Russia; Junior AA: Angelina Melnikova; Junior VT: (United Kingdom) Ellie Downie; Junior UB: Daria Skrypnik; Junior BB: Angelina Melnikova; Junior FX: (United Kingdom) Catherine Lyons
21–25 May	(Australia) Melbourne	Australian National Championships	Senior AA: Georgia Godwin; Senior VT: Isis Lowery; Senior UB: Larrissa Miller; Senior BB: Mary-Anne Monckton; Senior FX: Lauren Mitchell; Junior AA: Alysha Djuric; Junior VT: Alysha Djuric; Junior UB: Darcy Norman; Junior BB: Emily Whitehead; Junior FX: Paige James
26–31 May	(Canada) Ottawa	Canadian National Championships	Senior AA: Ellie Black; Senior VT: Briannah Tsang; Senior UB: Ellie Black; Senior BB: Isabela Onyshko; Senior FX: Victoria Moors; Junior AA: Rose-Kaying Woo; Junior VT: Shallon Olsen; Junior UB: Rose-Kaying Woo; Junior BB: Audrey Rousseau; Junior FX: Rose-Kaying Woo
29 May – 1 June	(Portugal) Anadia	Anadia World Cup	VT: (Slovenia) Teja Belak; UB: (Venezuela) Jessica López; BB: (Venezuela) Jessica López; FX: (Portugal) Ana Filipa Martins
31 May – 6 June	(Italy) Ancona	Italian National Championships	AA: Elisa Meneghini; VT: Arianna Rocca; UB: Giorgia Campana; BB: Elisa Meneghini; FX: Elisa Meneghini
6–8 June	(Slovakia) Trnava	2014 Gym Festival Trnava	International AA: (Azerbaijan) Anna Pavlova; National Senior AA: (Slovakia) Barbora Mokosova; National Junior AA: (Slovakia) Dominika Korpova; Senior VT: (Azerbaijan) Anna Pavlova; Senior UB: (Germany) Lisa Katharina Hill; Senior BB: (Azerbaijan) Anna Pavlova; Senior FX: (Russia) Alexandra Yazydzhyan
7–8 June	(Japan) Tokyo	NHK CUP	AA: Natsumi Sasada
14–15 June	(Germany) Traunreut	German Youth National Championships	AA (born 1999): Sarah Voss; AA (born 2000): Tabea Alt; AA (born 2001): Emma Höfele; AA (born 2002): Hala Sidaoui
14–22 June	(China) Shenzhen	Junior Chinese National Championships	Group A AA: Liu Tingting; Group A VT: Liu Jinru; Group A UB: Liu Tingting; Group A BB: Zhang Wenxin; Group A FX: Liu Tingting; Group B AA: Li Qi; Group B VT: Yang Yinbao; Group B UB: Li Qi; Group B BB: Li Qi; Group B FX: Li Qi
21–22 June	(Netherlands) Rotterdam	Dutch National Championships	Senior AA: Lisa Top; Senior VT: Noël van Klaveren; Senior UB: Vera van Pol; Senior BB: Sanne Wevers; Senior FX: Lisa Top; Junior AA: Tisha Volleman; Junior VT: Isa Maassen; Junior UB: Dana de Groot; Junior BB: Helene Houbraken; Junior FX: Tisha Volleman; Youth AA: Sanna Veerman; Youth VT: Sanna Veerman; Youth UB: Sanna Veerman; Youth BB: Juliette Berens; Youth FX: Juliette Berens
1–4 July	(Russia) Penza	Student Spartakiada	AA: Seda Tutkhalyan; VT: Seda Tutkhalyan; UB: Viktoria Kuzmina; BB: Ekaterina Tyunina; FX: Lilia Akhaimova
5 July	(United States) Huntsville	American Classic	Senior AA: Macy Toronjo; Junior AA: Jazmyn Foberg
5–6 July	(Japan) Tokyo	Japanese National Championships (EF)	VT: Sae Miyakawa; UB: Asuka Teramoto; BB: Yu Minobe & Yuna Hiraiwa; FX: Mai Murakami
5–6 July	(Spain) Valladolid	Spanish National Championships	AA: Roxana Popa; VT: Roxana Popa; UB: Roxana Popa; BB: Laura Gamell; FX: Roxana Popa
17–19 July	(Mexico) Guadalajara	Pan American Sports Festival	AA: (Cuba) Yesenia Ferrera; VT: (Cuba) Yesenia Ferrera; UB: (Cuba) Yesenia Ferrera; BB: (Argentina) Ayelén Tarabini; FX: (Cuba) Yesenia Ferrera
24 July – 1 August	(Scotland) Glasgow	2014 Commonwealth Games	TF: England; AA: Claudia Fragapane; VT: Claudia Fragapane; UB: Becky Downie; BB: (Canada) Ellie Black; FX: Claudia Fragapane
31 July – 2 August	(United States) Chicago	U.S. Classic	Senior AA: Simone Biles; Senior VT: Simone Biles; Senior UB: Ashton Locklear; Senior BB: Simone Biles & Kyla Ross; Senior FX: Simone Biles; Junior AA: Jordan Chiles; Junior VT: Jordan Chiles; Junior UB: Nia Dennis; Junior BB: Norah Flatley; Junior FX: Ragan Smith
31 July – 3 August	(Brazil) Aracaju	Brazilian National Championships	Senior AA: Daniele Hypólito; Junior AA: Flávia Saraiva; VT: Jade Barbosa; UB: Letícia Costa; BB: Daniele Hypólito; FX: Daniele Hypólito
16–28 August	(China) Nanjing	2014 Summer Youth Olympics	AA: (Russia) Seda Tutkhalyan; VT: (China) Wang Yan; UB: (Russia) Seda Tutkhalyan; BB: (China) Wang Yan; FX: (Brazil) Flávia Saraiva
21–24 August	(United States) Pittsburgh	US National Championships	Senior AA: Simone Biles; Senior VT: Simone Biles; Senior UB: Ashton Locklear; Senior BB: Kyla Ross; Senior FX: Simone Biles; Junior AA: Jazmyn Foberg; Junior VT: Nia Dennis; Junior UB: Jazmyn Foberg; Junior BB: Alexis Vasquez; Junior FX: Nia Dennis
23–24 August	(Belgium) Ghent	Ghent World Cup	N/A – Cancelled
23–24 August	(Germany) Stuttgart	German National Championships	AA: Kim Bùi; VT: Pauline Schäfer; UB: Lisa Katharina Hill; BB: Pauline Schäfer; FX: Kim Bùi
27–31 August	(Russia) Penza	Russian Cup	TF: Moscow (Aliya Mustafina, Maria Paseka, Alla Sosnitskaya, & Daria Spiridonova); AA: Aliya Mustafina; VT: Alla Sosnitskaya; UB: Viktoria Komova; BB: Aliya Mustafina; FX: Aliya Mustafina
29–31 August	(Hungary) Budapest	Hungarian National Championships	AA: Noémi Makra; VT: Noémi Makra; UB: Noémi Makra; BB: Noémi Makra; FX: Noémi Makra
30–31 August	(Romania) Bucharest	Romanian National Championships	AA: Larisa Iordache; VT: Larisa Iordache; UB: Larisa Iordache; BB: Andreea Munteanu; FX: Larisa Iordache
30–31 August	(Switzerland) Widen	Swiss National Championships	Elite AA: Giulia Steingruber; Amateur AA: Yasmin Trachsel; VT: Giulia Steingruber; UB: Giulia Steingruber; BB: Ilaria Käslin; FX: Giulia Steingruber
30 August – 1 September	(Canada) Toronto	Senior Pan American Championships	TF: United States; AA: Mykayla Skinner; VT: Mykayla Skinner; UB: Ashton Locklear; BB: (Guatemala) Ana Sofía Gómez; FX: Mykayla Skinner
6 September	(Switzerland) Obersiggenthal	Länderkampf Kunstturnen (SUI-GER-ROU Friendly)	TF: (Germany); AA: (Romania) Larisa Iordache; VT: (Romania) Larisa Iordache; UB: (Germany) Lisa Katharina Hill; BB: (Romania) Larisa Iordache; FX: (Romania) Larisa Iordache
6 September	(Italy) Novara	Novara Cup	TF: Italy; AA: Vanessa Ferrari
6–7 September	(United Kingdom) West Midlands	British Team Championships	The City of Liverpool (Charlie Fellows, Hannah Whelan, Jade Stedford, Kelsey Moore, Lucy Stanhope, & Olivia Williams)
6–7 September	(Turkey) Istanbul	International Bosphorus Tournament	AA: (Azerbaijan) Anna Pavlova; VT: (Azerbaijan) Anna Pavlova; UB: (Azerbaijan) Anna Pavlova; BB: (Azerbaijan) Anna Pavlova; FX: (Kazakhstan) Aida Bauyrzhanova
6–7 September	(Italy) Ragusa	Junior Mediterranean Championships	AA: (Italy) Sofia Busato; VT: (Italy) Sofia Busato; UB: (Spain) Melania Rodriguez; BB: (Turkey) Tutya Yilmaz; FX: (Italy) Sofia Busato
6–7 September	(United Kingdom) Manchester	UK School Games	TF: England; AA: Georgia-Mae Fenton; VT: (Northern Ireland) Casey Jo Bell; UB: Alice Kinsella; BB: Amelia Montague; FX: Georgia-Mae Fenton
12–14 September	(Denmark) Greve	Northern European Championships	TF: Wales; AA: Maisie Methuen; VT: (Finland) Annika Urvikko; UB: Angel Romaeo; BB: Latalia Bevan; FX: Angel Romaeo
12–14 September	(Ukraine) Brovary	Stella Zakharova Cup	N/A – Cancelled
13 September	(Japan) Kitakyushu	All Japan Senior Championships	AA: Yu Minobe
13 September	(France) Rouen	Rencontre Internationale de Gymnastique (AUT-FRA-NED Friendly)	TF: Netherlands; AA: Céline van Gerner
13–14 September	(Italy) Porto San Giorgio	Gymnastics Golden League	AA: Vanessa Ferrari; VT (1): Erika Fasana; VT (2): Arianna Rocca; UB: Giorgia Campana; BB: Elisa Meneghini; FX: Erika Fasana
13–14 September	(Hungary) Szombathely	Hungarian Grand Prix	AA: (Hungary) Dorina Böczögő; VT: (Hungary) Luca Divéky; UB: (Hungary) Dorina Böczögő; BB: (Hungary) Luca Divéky; FX: (Hungary) Dorina Böczögő
17 September – 4 October	(South Korea) Incheon	2014 Asian Games	TF: (China); AA: (China) Yao Jinnan; VT: (North Korea) Hong Un-jong; UB: (China) Yao Jinnan; BB: (North Korea) Kim Un-hyang; FX: (China) Yao Jinnan
3–4 October	(Germany) Hamburg	Hamburg Gymnastics Meet	TF: Italy; AA: (Netherlands) Eythora Thorsdottir
3–12 October	(China) Nanning	2014 World Artistic Gymnastics Championships	TF: United States; AA: Simone Biles; VT: (North Korea) Hong Un-jong; UB: (China) Yao Jinnan; BB: Simone Biles; FX: Simone Biles
15–18 October	(Iceland) Reykjavík	European TeamGym Championships	Senior TF: Sweden; Junior TF: Denmark
23–25 October	(Romania) Deva	Romanian Junior National Championships	Division 1 (born 1999); AA: Dora Vulcan; VT: Dora Vulcan; UB: Dora Vulcan; BB: Dora Vulcan; FX: Teea Milea & Dora Vulcan
28 October – 4 November	(China) Shanghai	Chinese Individual National Championships	AA: Luo Huan; VT: Liu Jinru; UB: Luo Huan; BB: Xu Li; FX: Liu Jinru
29 October	(Switzerland) Chiasso	Arthur Gander Memorial	(Russia) Daria Spiridonova
2 November	(Switzerland) Zürich	Swiss Cup	(Russia) Daria Spiridonova & Nikita Ignatyev
7–9 November	(Colombia) Medellín	Medellín World Cup	VT: (Dominican Republic) Yamilet Peña; UB: (Portugal) Ana Filipa Martins; BB: (Panama) Isabella Amado; FX: (Peru) Mariana Chiarella
8 November	(Czech Republic) Liberec	Olympic Hopes' Cup	TF: (United Kingdom) Great Britain; AA: (United Kingdom) Alice Kinsella
8–9 November	(France) Combs-la-Ville	18th Tournoi International	TF: Russia; AA: Natalia Kapitonova; VT: (France) Coline Devillard; UB: Natalia Kapitonova; BB: (France) Coline Devillard; FX: Daria Mikhailova
14–16 November	(France) Marseille	2014 Elite Gym Massilia	Open TF: Belgium 2 Master TF: Italy; Open AA: (Switzerland) Giada Grisetti; Master AA: (Russia) Daria Spiridonova; VT: (Russia) Maria Paseka; UB: (Russia) Daria Spiridonova; BB: (France) Claire Martin; FX: Axelle Klinckaert
15 November	(Spain) Barcelona	Joaquim Blume Memorial	AA: (Spain) Roxana Popa; VT: (Spain) Roxana Popa; UB: (Spain) Roxana Popa; BB: (Poland) Marta Pihan-Kulesza; FX: (Spain) Roxana Popa
15–16 November	(Hungary) Budapest	KSI-Matsz Cup	VT: (Croatia) Ana Derek; UB: (Russia) Viktoria Komova; BB: (Russia) Viktoria Komova; FX: (Hungary) Tünde Csillag
15–30 November	(Mexico) Veracruz	2014 Central American and Caribbean Games	TF: Mexico; AA: (Venezuela) Jessica López; VT: (Cuba) Yesenia Ferrera; UB: (Venezuela) Jessica López; BB: (Venezuela) Jessica López; FX: (Cuba) Yesenia Ferrera
22–23 November	(Austria) Lustenau	Austrian National Championships	Senior AA: Lisa Ecker; Senior VT: Elisa Hämmerle; Senior UB: Jasmin Mader; Senior BB: Elisa Hämmerle; Senior FX: Lisa Ecker; Junior AA: Bianca Frysak; Junior VT: Bianca Frysak; Junior UB: Bianca Frysak; Junior BB: Bianca Frysak; Junior FX: Erja Metzler
22–23 November	(Belgium) Malmedy	Coupe Avenir	TF: Romania; AA: (Canada) Sydney Soloski; VT: (Canada) Sydney Soloski; UB: (Canada) Sydney Laird; BB: Asiana Peng; FX: Asiana Peng
27 November – 2 December	(Russia) Penza	Russian Hopes	Master of Sport; AA: Ekaterina Sokova; VT: Evgenia Menovshikova; UB: Daria Skrypnik; BB: Daria Skrypnik; FX: Evgeniya Shelgunova; Candidate Master of Sport; AA: Anastasia Ilyankova; VT: Anastasia Ilyankova; UB: Anastasia Ilyankova; BB: Anastasia Ilyankova; FX: Natalia Kapitonova
29 November	(Czech Republic) Brno	Sokol Grand Prix	(Ukraine) Krystyna Sankova & Maksym Semyankiv
29–30 November	(Germany) Stuttgart	DTB Team Challenge	(Germany)
29–30 November	(Germany) Stuttgart	2014 Stuttgart World Cup	(Romania) Larisa Iordache
29–30 November	(Belgium) Charleroi	Top Gym	TF: Canada 1/Hungary; AA: (Russia) Angelina Melnikova; VT: (Russia) Angelina Melnikova; UB: (Russia) Angelina Melnikova; BB: (France) Marine Boyer; FX: (Romania) Olivia Cîmpian
5–6 December	(Mexico) Acapulco	Mexican Open	(Poland) Marta Pihan-Kulesza
6 December	(United Kingdom) Glasgow	Glasgow World Cup	(Romania) Larisa Iordache
6–7 December	(United Kingdom) Glasgow	British Espoir Championships	AA: Maisie Methuen; VT: Alice Kinsella; UB: Taeja James; BB: Lucy Stanhope; FX: Laura Kaletha
6–11 December	(Australia) Lake Macquarie	International Children's Games	TF: Hungary; AA: Boglárka Dévai; VT: Boglárka Dévai; UB: Boglárka Dévai; BB: (Russia) Svetlana Mazunina; FX: (Russia) Svetlana Mazunina
10–15 December	(Bolivia) Cochabamba	South American Championships	TF: Peru; AA: (Argentina) Ailen Valente; VT: Ariana Orrego; UB: Ariana Orrego; BB: Mariana Chiarella; FX: Mariana Chiarella
12–13 December	(France) Arque	Pas de Calais International	Senior/Junior TF: (United Kingdom) Great Britain; Senior AA: (United Kingdom) Angel Romaeo; Junior AA: (United Kingdom) Georgia-Mae Fenton; Senior/Junior VT: Lilia Akhaimova; Senior/Junior UB: (United Kingdom) Georgia-Mae Fenton; Senior/Junior BB: (United Kingdom) Georgia-Mae Fenton; Senior/Junior FX: (Netherlands) Mara Titarsolej; Espoir TF: Russia; Espoir AA: Valeriya Sayfulina; Espoir VT: Valeriya Sayfulina; Espoir UB: Valeriya Sayfulina; Espoir BB: Valeriya Sayfulina; Espoir FX: Aleksandra Kalkutina
13–14 December	(Japan) Toyota	Toyota International	VT: (Japan) Mai Murakami; UB: (Japan) Wakana Inoue; BB: (Japan) Asuka Teramoto; FX: (Japan) Mai Murakami
16–17 December	(Russia) Moscow	2014 Voronin Cup	TF: Russia; Senior AA: Ekaterina Kramarenko; Senior VT: Maria Paseka; Senior UB: Ekaterina Kramarenko; Senior BB: Ekaterina Kramarenko; Senior FX: Ksenia Afanasyeva; Junior AA: Anastasia Ilyankova; Junior VT: Ekaterina Sokova; Junior UB: Natalia Kapitonova; Junior BB: Ekaterina Sokova; Junior FX: Ekaterina Sokova

== International medalists (WAG) ==
=== Major Competitions ===
==== International Competitions ====
World Championships
Competition	Gold	Silver	Bronze
World Championships	TF: United States; AA: Simone Biles; VT: (North Korea) Hong Un-jong; UB: (China) Yao Jinnan; BB: Simone Biles; FX: Simone Biles	TF: China; AA: (Romania) Larisa Iordache; VT: (United States) Simone Biles; UB: Huang Huidan; BB: Bai Yawen; FX: (Romania) Larisa Iordache	TF: Russia; AA: (United States) Kyla Ross; VT: (United States) Mykayla Skinner; UB: Daria Spiridonova; BB: Aliya Mustafina; FX: Aliya Mustafina

Youth Olympics
Competition	Gold	Silver	Bronze
Youth Olympics	AA: (Russia) Seda Tutkhalyan; VT: (China) Wang Yan; UB: (Russia) Seda Tutkhalyan; BB: (China) Wang Yan; FX: (Brazil) Flávia Saraiva	AA: (Brazil) Flávia Saraiva; VT: (United Kingdom) Ellie Downie; UB: (Italy) Iosra Abdelaziz; BB: (Brazil) Flávia Saraiva; FX: (Russia) Seda Tutkhalyan	AA: (United Kingdom) Ellie Downie; VT: (Japan) Sae Miyakawa; UB: (China) Wang Yan; BB: (United Kingdom) Ellie Downie; FX: (United Kingdom) Ellie Downie

==== Continental Championships ====
Continental Championships
Competition	Gold	Silver	Bronze
European	Senior TF: Romania; Senior VT: (Switzerland) Giulia Steingruber; Senior UB: (United Kingdom) Becky Downie; Senior BB: (Russia) Maria Kharenkova; Senior FX: (Italy) Vanessa Ferrari & Larisa Iordache	Senior TF: (United Kingdom) Great Britain; Senior VT: (Azerbaijan) Anna Pavlova; Senior UB: (Russia) Aliya Mustafina; Senior BB: (Romania) Larisa Iordache	Senior TF: Russia; Senior VT: (Romania) Larisa Iordache; Senior UB: Daria Spiridonova; Senior BB: Aliya Mustafina; Senior FX: (Switzerland) Giulia Steingruber
Pacific Rim	TF: United States; Senior AA: Elizabeth Price; Senior VT: (Canada) Ellie Black; Senior UB: Elizabeth Price; Senior BB: Kyla Ross; Senior FX: Elizabeth Price	TF: Canada; Senior AA: (United States) Kyla Ross; Senior VT: (New Zealand) Courtney McGregor; Senior UB: (United States) Kyla Ross; Senior BB: (China) Xie Yufen; Senior FX: (United States) Kyla Ross	TF: China; Senior AA: (Canada) Ellie Black; Senior VT: (Canada) Maegan Chant; Senior UB: (Australia) Georgia-Rose Brown; Senior BB: (United States) Elizabeth Price; Senior FX: (Canada) Aleeza Yu
Pan American	TF: United States; AA: Mykayla Skinner; VT: Mykayla Skinner; UB: Ashton Locklear; BB: (Guatemala) Ana Sofía Gómez; FX: Mykayla Skinner	TF: Brazil; AA: (Venezuela) Jessica López; VT: (Cuba) Yesenia Ferrera; UB: (United States) Madison Kocian; BB: (Venezuela) Jessica López; FX: (Venezuela) Jessica López	TF: Mexico; AA: (United States) Maggie Nichols; VT: (Cuba) Dovelis Torres; UB: Ahtziri Sandoval; BB: (Brazil) Julie Sinmon; FX: (Cuba) Yesenia Ferrera
African	Senior TF: South Africa; Senior AA: Kirsten Beckett; Senior VT: (Egypt) Fadwa Mahmoud; Senior UB: Kirsten Beckett; Senior BB: (Egypt) Farida Shokry; Senior FX: Kirsten Beckett	Senior TF: Egypt; Senior AA: (South Africa) Bianca Mann; Senior VT: (South Africa) Kirsten Beckett; Senior UB: (South Africa) Bianca Mann; Senior BB: (South Africa) Bianca Mann; Senior FX: Rana Elbialy	Senior TF: Morocco; Senior AA: (Egypt) Rowan Wageeh; Senior VT: (Egypt) Rowan Wageeh; Senior UB: (Egypt) Mariam Elkoukho; Senior BB: (South Africa) Kirsten Beckett; Senior FX: (Egypt) Farida Shokry
South American	TF: Peru; AA: (Argentina) Ailen Valente; VT: Ariana Orrego; UB: Ariana Orrego; BB: Mariana Chiarella; FX: Mariana Chiarella	TF: Ecuador; AA: (Peru) Ariana Orrego; VT: (Peru) Andrea Camino; UB: (Argentina) Ailen Valente; UB: (Peru) Ariana Orrego; UB: (Peru) Ariana Orrego	TF: Bolivia; AA: (Peru) Mariana Chiarella; VT: Dianne Soria; UB: (Peru) Mariana Chiarella; BB: (Argentina) Ailen Valente; FX: (Argentina) Ailen Valente

==== Multi-sport Games ====
Multi-sport
Competition	Gold	Silver	Bronze
Commonwealth Games	TF: England; AA: Claudia Fragapane; VT: Claudia Fragapane; UB: Becky Downie; BB: (Canada) Ellie Black; FX: Claudia Fragapane	TF: Australia; AA: (England) Ruby Harrold; VT: (Canada) Ellie Black; UB: Larrissa Miller; BB: Mary-Anne Monckton; FX: Lauren Mitchell	TF: Wales; AA: (England) Hannah Whelan; VT: (India) Dipa Karmakar; UB: (England) Ruby Harrold; BB: Georgina Hockenhull; FX: (Canada) Ellie Black
Asian Games	TF: China; AA: Yao Jinnan; VT: (North Korea) Hong Un-jong; UB: Yao Jinnan; BB: (North Korea) Kim Un-hyang; FX: Yao Jinnan	TF: North Korea; AA: (China) Shang Chunsong; VT: (Uzbekistan) Oksana Chusovitina; UB: (China) Huang Huidan; BB: (Vietnam) Phan Thị Hà Thanh; FX: (China) Shang Chunsong	TF: Japan; AA: (South Korea) Yun Na-rae; VT: (Vietnam) Phan Thị Hà Thanh; UB: (North Korea) Kang Yong-mi; BB: (China) Shang Chunsong; FX: (South Korea) Yun Na-rae
South American Games	TF: Brazil; AA: Jade Barbosa; VT: Jade Barbosa; UB: (Colombia) Bibiana Velez; BB: (Chile) Simona Castro; FX: Daniele Hypólito	TF: Chile; AA: Simona Castro; VT: (Brazil) Isabelle Cruz; UB: (Brazil) Jade Barbosa; BB: (Peru) Mariana Chiarella; FX: Barbara Achondo & Makarena Pinto	TF: Colombia; AA: (Brazil) Julie Sinmon & (Chile) Makarena Pinto; VT: (Chile) Makarena Pinto; UB: Yurany Avendano; BB: (Chile) Melany Cabrera
Central American and Caribbean Games	TF: Mexico; AA: (Venezuela) Jessica López; VT: (Cuba) Yesenia Ferrera; UB: (Venezuela) Jessica López; BB: (Venezuela) Jessica López; FX: (Cuba) Yesenia Ferrera	TF: Cuba; AA: (Mexico) Elsa García; VT: Dovelis Torres; UB: (Guatemala) Ana Sofía Gómez; BB: (Mexico) Ana Lago; FX: (Venezuela) Jessica López	TF: Colombia; AA: (Cuba) Yesenia Ferrera; VT: (Puerto Rico) Nicolle Vasquez; UB: Bibiana Velez; BB: (Cuba) Yesenia Ferrera; FX: (Cuba) Dovelis Torres

=== World Cup Series ===
FIG World Cup
Competition	Gold	Silver	Bronze
American Cup	(United States) Elizabeth Price	(United States) Brenna Dowell	(Switzerland) Giulia Steingruber
Cottbus	VT: (Germany) Janine Berger; UB: (Germany) Sophie Scheder; BB: (Hungary) Noémi Makra; FX: (Poland) Marta Pihan-Kulesza	VT: (Germany) Kim Bùi; UB: (Russia) Anna Rodionova; BB: (Russia) Maria Kharenkova; FX: (Germany) Kim Bùi	VT: (Poland) Paula Plichta; UB: (Hungary) Noémi Makra; BB: (Romania) Andreea Munteanu; FX: (Russia) Maria Kharenkova
Doha	VT: (Romania) Larisa Iordache; UB: (Czech Republic) Kristýna Pálešová; BB: (Romania) Larisa Iordache; FX: (Romania) Larisa Iordache	VT: (Slovenia) Teja Belak; UB: (Czech Republic) Jana Šikulová; BB: (Australia) Mary-Anne Monckton; FX: (Romania) Diana Bulimar	VT: (Hong Kong) Angel Hiu Ying Wong; UB: (Switzerland) Laura Schulte; BB: (Vietnam) Phan Thị Hà Thanh; FX: (Canada) Isabela Onyshko
Tokyo	(Italy) Vanessa Ferrari	(Spain) Roxana Popa	(United States) Maggie Nichols
Ljubljana	VT: (Slovenia) Teja Belak; UB: (Azerbaijan) Anna Pavlova; BB: (Slovenia) Teja Belak; FX: (Argentina) Ayelen Tarabini & (Slovenia) Saša Golob	VT: (Croatia) Ana Derek; UB: (Belarus) Anastasiya Yekimenka; BB: (Austria) Jessica Stabinger	VT: (Argentina) Ayelen Tarabini; UB: (Switzerland) Stefanie Siegenthaler; BB: (Switzerland) Stefanie Siegenthaler; FX: (Kazakhstan) Ekaterina Chuikina
Osijek	VT: (Vietnam) Phan Thị Hà Thanh; UB: (North Korea) Kang Yong Mi; BB: (Vietnam) Phan Thị Hà Thanh; FX: (Switzerland) Giulia Steingruber	VT: (Switzerland) Giulia Steingruber; UB: (Hungary) Noémi Makra; BB: (North Korea) Kim Un-hyang; FX: (Canada) Isabela Onyshko	VT: (Slovenia) Teja Belak; UB: (Sweden) Kim Singmuang; BB: (Switzerland) Giulia Steingruber; FX: (Vietnam) Phan Thị Hà Thanh
Anadia	VT: (Slovenia) Teja Belak; UB: (Venezuela) Jessica López; BB: (Venezuela) Jessica López; FX: (Portugal) Ana Filipa Martins	VT: (Austria) Elisa Haemmerle; UB: (Portugal) Ana Filipa Martins; BB: (Slovenia) Teja Belak; FX: (Austria) Jasmin Mader	VT: (Portugal) Ana Filipa Martins; UB: (Uzbekistan) Asal Saparbaeva & (Austria) Elisa Haemmerle; BB: (Portugal) Diana Abrantes; FX: (Uzbekistan) Elena Rega
Ghent	N/A	N/A	N/A
Medellín	VT: (Dominican Republic) Yamilet Peña; UB: (Portugal) Ana Filipa Martins; BB: (Panama) Isabella Amado; FX: (Peru) Mariana Chiarella	VT: (Croatia) Ana Derek; UB: (Colombia) Marcela Sandoval; BB: (Colombia) Marcela Sandoval; FX: (Slovenia) Saša Golob	VT: (Panama) Isabella Amado; UB: (Colombia) Bibiana Velez; BB: (Slovenia) Tjasa Kyselef; FX: (Portugal) Ana Filipa Martins
Stuttgart	(Romania) Larisa Iordache	(Venezuela) Jessica López	(Germany) Kim Bùi
Glasgow	(Romania) Larisa Iordache	(Canada) Ellie Black	(Venezuela) Jessica López

=== National Championships ===
Note: Although England, Scotland, and Wales are listed as individual countries in the table below, gymnasts from these countries compete under the flag of Great Britain in all international competitions except for the Commonwealth Games.

National Championships
Nation	Gold	Silver	Bronze
Australia	Senior AA: Georgia Godwin; Senior VT: Isis Lowery; Senior UB: Larrissa Miller; Senior BB: Mary-Anne Monckton; Senior FX: Lauren Mitchell	Senior AA: Madelaine Leydin; Senior VT: Kiara Munteanu; Senior UB: Olivia Vivian; Senior BB: Emma Jane Nedov; Senior FX: Georgia Godwin	Senior AA: Kiara Munteanu; Senior VT: Grace Flood; Senior UB: Madelaine Leydin; Senior BB: Lauren Mitchell; Senior FX: Olivia Vivian
Austria	Senior AA: Lisa Ecker; Senior VT: Elisa Hämmerle; Senior UB: Jasmin Mader; Senior BB: Elisa Hämmerle; Senior FX: Lisa Ecker	Senior AA: Elisa Hämmerle; Senior VT: Jasmin Mader; Senior UB: Lisa Ecker; Senior BB: Lisa Ecker; Senior FX: Elisa Hämmerle	Senior AA: Jessica Stabinger; Senior VT: Christina Meixner; Senior UB: Jessica Stabinger; Senior BB: Jessica Stabinger; Senior FX: Jessica Stabinger
Belgium	AA: Lisa Vershueren	AA: Laura Waem	AA: Gaelle Mys
Brazil	Senior AA: Daniele Hypólito; VT: Jade Barbosa; UB: Letícia Costa; BB: Daniele Hypólito; FX: Daniele Hypólito	Senior AA: Jade Barbosa; VT: Daniele Hypólito; UB: Jade Barbosa; BB: Julie Sinmon; FX: Mariana Valentin	Senior AA: Maria Cecília; VT: Joselane Santos; UB: Maria Cecília; BB: Flávia Saraiva; FX: Julie Sinmon
Canada	Senior AA: Ellie Black; Senior VT: Briannah Tsang; Senior UB: Ellie Black; Senior BB: Isabela Onyshko; Senior FX: Victoria Moors	Senior AA: Isabela Onyshko; Senior VT: Maegan Chant; Senior UB: Isabela Onyshko; Senior BB: Kirsten Peterman; Senior FX: Maegan Chant	Senior AA: Victoria Moors; Senior VT: Kirsten Peterman; Senior UB: Victoria Moors; Senior BB: Stefanie Merkle; Senior FX: Stefanie Merkle
China	AA: Yao Jinnan; VT: Wang Yan; UB: Yao Jinnan; BB: Shang Chunsong; FX: Shang Chunsong	AA: Shang Chunsong; VT: Deng Yalan; UB: Shang Chunsong & Huang Huidan; BB: Bai Yawen; FX: Yao Jinnan	AA: Wang Yan; VT: Liu Jinru; BB: Liu Tingting; FX: Wang Yan
England	Senior AA: Ruby Harrold; Senior VT: Claudia Fragapane; Senior UB: Ruby Harrold; Senior BB: Becky Downie; Senior FX: Kelly Simm	Senior AA: Kelly Simm; Senior VT: Lisa Mason; Senior UB: Becky Downie; Senior BB: Jade Armstrong; Senior FX: Emily Crowe	Senior AA: Claudia Fragapane; Senior VT: Kelly Simm; Senior UB: Charlie Fellows; Senior BB: Loriah James; Senior FX: Ruby Harrold
France	Senior AA: Youna Dufournet; VT: Coline Devillard; UB: Youna Dufournet; BB: Youna Dufournet; FX: Anne Kuhm	Senior AA: Valentine Pikul; VT: Camille Bahl; UB: Loan His; BB: Valentine Sabatou; FX: Marine Brevet & Manon Cormoreche	Senior AA: Valentine Sabatou; VT: Gaelle Gourtay; UB: Valentine Pikul; BB: Coline Devillard
Germany	AA: Kim Bùi; VT: Pauline Schäfer; UB: Lisa Katharina Hill; BB: Pauline Schäfer; FX: Kim Bùi	AA: Pauline Schäfer; VT: Janine Berger; UB: Kim Bùi; BB: Maike Roll; FX: Pauline Schäfer	AA: Lisa Katharina Hill; VT: Kim Bùi; UB: Sophie Scheder; BB: Cagla Akyol; FX: Marlene Bindig
(United Kingdom) Great Britain	Senior AA: Rebecca Tunney; Senior VT: Kelly Simm; Senior UB: Rebecca Tunney; Senior BB: Becky Downie; Senior FX: Elizabeth Beddoe	Senior AA: Becky Downie; Senior VT: Claudia Fragapane; Senior UB: Becky Downie; Senior BB: Hannah Whelan; Senior FX: Emily Crowe	Senior AA: Claudia Fragapane; Senior VT: Emma White; Senior UB: Claudia Fragapane; Senior BB: Rebecca Tunney; Senior FX: Hannah Whelan
Hungary	AA: Noémi Makra; VT: Noémi Makra; UB: Noémi Makra; BB: Noémi Makra; FX: Noémi Makra	AA: Luca Divéky; VT: Luca Divéky; UB: Tunde Csillag; BB: Luca Divéky; FX: Dorina Böczögő	AA: Tunde Csillag; VT: Tunde Csillag; UB: Dalia Al-Salty; BB: Enikő Horváth; FX: Eszter Romhányi
Italy	AA: Elisa Meneghini; VT: Arianna Rocca; UB: Giorgia Campana; BB: Elisa Meneghini; FX: Elisa Meneghini	AA: Iosra Abdelaziz; VT: Alessia Leolini; UB: Martina Rizzelli; BB: Arianna Rocca; FX: Lara Mori	AA: Lavinia Marongiu; VT: Adriana Crisci; UB: Chiara Gandolfi; BB: Jessica Mattoni; FX: Iosra Abdelaziz & Pilar Rubagotti
Japan	AA: Natsumi Sasada; VT: Sae Miyakawa; UB: Asuka Teramoto; BB: Yu Minobe & Yuna Hiraiwa; FX: Mai Murakami	AA: Asuka Teramoto; VT: Mai Murakami; UB: Yuki Uchiyama; FX: Sae Miyakawa	AA: Yuna Hiraiwa; VT: Asuka Teramoto; UB: Chinami Otaki; BB: Wakana Inoue; FX: Wakana Inoue
Netherlands	Senior AA: Lisa Top; Senior VT: Noël van Klaveren; Senior UB: Vera van Pol; Senior BB: Sanne Wevers; Senior FX: Lisa Top	Senior AA: Maartje Ruikes; Senior VT: Vera van Pol; Senior UB: Sanne Wevers; Senior BB: Maartje Ruikes; Senior FX: Vera van Pol	Senior AA: Vera van Pol; Senior VT: Kimberley van der Zal; Senior UB: Lisa Top; Senior BB: Shirley van Deene; Senior FX: Noël van Klaveren
Romania	AA: Larisa Iordache; VT: Larisa Iordache; UB: Larisa Iordache; BB: Andreea Munteanu; FX: Larisa Iordache	AA: Ștefania Stănilă; VT: Andreea Ciurusniuc; UB: Andreea Iridon; BB: Larisa Iordache; FX: Andreea Munteanu	AA: Andreea Iridon; VT: Ana Maria Ocolișan, Ștefania Stănilă, & Silvia Orzu; UB: Ana Maria Ocolișan; BB: Andreea Iridon; FX: Ștefania Stănilă
Russia	Senior AA: Aliya Mustafina; Senior VT: Alla Sosnitskaya; Senior UB: Daria Spiridonova; Senior BB: Maria Kharenkova; Senior FX: Polina Fedorova	Senior AA: Alla Sosnitskaya; Senior VT: Maria Paseka; Senior UB: Anna Rodionova; Senior BB: Daria Spiridonova; Senior FX: Alla Sosnitskaya	Senior AA: Anastasia Grishina; Senior VT: Tatiana Nabieva; Senior UB: Alla Sosnitskaya; Senior BB: Aliya Mustafina; Senior FX: Kristina Goryunova
Scotland	Senior AA: Emma White; Senior VT: Emma White; Senior UB: Emma White; Senior BB: Erin McLachlan; Senior FX: Carly Smith	Senior AA: Carly Smith; Senior VT: Erin McLachlan; Senior UB: Kirsty Campbell; Senior BB: Beth McKellar; Senior FX: Beth McKellar	Senior AA: Beth McKellar; Senior VT: Kirsty Campbell; Senior UB: Carly Smith; Senior BB: Cara Kennedy; Senior FX: Kirsty Campbell
Spain	AA: Roxana Popa; VT: Roxana Popa; UB: Roxana Popa; BB: Laura Gamell; FX: Roxana Popa	AA: Maria Paula Vargas; VT: Marianna Colussi; UB: Maria Paula Vargas; BB: Roxana Popa; FX: Laura Gamell	AA: Cintia Rodriguez; VT: Ainhoa Carmano; UB: Cintia Rodriguez; BB: Cintia Rodriguez; FX: Cintia Rodriguez
Switzerland	AA: Giulia Steingruber; VT: Giulia Steingruber; UB: Giulia Steingruber; BB: Ilaria Käslin; FX: Giulia Steingruber	AA: Caterina Barloggio; VT: Laura Schulte; UB: Caterina Barloggio; BB: Giulia Steingruber; FX: Laura Schulte	AA: Stefanie Siegenthaler; VT: Jessica Diacci; UB: Laura Schulte; BB: Caterina Barloggio; FX: Ilaria Käslin
United States	Senior AA: Simone Biles; Senior VT: Simone Biles; Senior UB: Ashton Locklear; Senior BB: Kyla Ross; Senior FX: Simone Biles	Senior AA: Kyla Ross; Senior VT: Mykayla Skinner; Senior UB: Madison Kocian; Senior BB: Simone Biles & Alyssa Baumann; Senior FX: Mykayla Skinner	Senior AA: Maggie Nichols; Senior UB: Maggie Nichols; Senior FX: Maggie Nichols
Wales	Senior AA: Raer Theaker; Senior VT: Jessica Hogg; Senior UB: Rebecca Moore; Senior BB: Georgina Hockenhull; Senior FX: Raer Theaker	Senior AA: Jessica Hogg; Senior UB: Raer Theaker; Senior BB: Angel Romaeo; Senior FX: Jessica Hogg	Senior AA: Georgina Hockenhull; Senior UB: Jessica Hogg; Senior BB: Elizabeth Beddoe; Senior FX: Georgina Hockenhull

== Season's best scores ==
Note: Only senior gymnasts have been included below. The following have been limited to six-per-country for AA rankings and four-per-country for event rankings. In major international competitions such as the World Championships, countries are limited to only two athletes in each final. Finalists in the 2014 World Championships are highlighted in green.

=== Women's All-Around ===
Rank	Name	Country	Best: Total score	Event
1	Simone Biles	(United States)	61.500	US Championships Day 1
2	Kyla Ross	(United States)	60.050	US Championships Day 2
3	Elizabeth Price	(United States)	59.966	American Cup
4	Larisa Iordache	(Romania)	59.766	Stuttgart World Cup
5	Aliya Mustafina	(Russia)	59.566	Russian Championships AA
6	Yao Jinnan	(China)	59.400	Chinese Championships AA
7	Maggie Nichols	(United States)	58.950	US Championships Day 2
8	Shang Chunsong	(China)	58.650	Chinese Championships AA
9	Alyssa Baumann	(United States)	58.400	US Championships Day 1
10	Alla Sosnitskaya	(Russia)	58.067	Russian Championships AA
11	Asuka Teramoto	(Japan)	58.050	School Championships Day 2
12	Ellie Black	(Canada)	58.025	Canadian Championships AA
13	Maria Kharenkova	(Russia)	57.834	Russian Cup AA
14	Mykayla Skinner	(United States)	57.800	US Championships Day 2
15	Jessica López	(Venezuela)	57.799	Stuttgart World Cup
16	Giulia Steingruber	(Switzerland)	57.765	European Championships QF
17	Roxana Popa	(Spain)	57.450	Spanish Championships
18	Vanessa Ferrari	(Italy)	57.231	World Championships QF
19	Victoria Moors	(Canada)	56.898	American Cup
20	Daria Spiridonova	(Russia)	56.799	Russian Cup AA

=== Women's Vault ===
Rank	Name	Country	Best: Total score	Event
1	Mykayla Skinner	(United States)	15.634	Jesolo EF
2	Hong Un-jong	(North Korea)	15.599	World Championships EF
3	Simone Biles	(United States)	15.554	World Championships EF
4	Alla Sosnitskaya	(Russia)	15.016	World Championships QF
5	Jade Barbosa	(Brazil)	14.875	Brazilian Championships EF
6	Alexa Moreno	(Mexico)	14.816	World Championships QF
7	Phan Thị Hà Thanh	(Vietnam)	14.800	World Championships QF
8	Claudia Fragapane	(United Kingdom)	14.716	World Championships EF
8	Giulia Steingruber	(Switzerland)	14.716	World Championships EF
10	Janine Berger	(Germany)	14.712	Cottbus World Cup
11	Oksana Chusovitina	(Uzbekistan)	14.675	Asian Games QF
12	Noël van Klaveren	(Netherlands)	14.666	Dutch Championships AA
13	Yesenia Ferrera	(Cuba)	14.663	Pan American Festival
14	Larisa Iordache	(Romania)	14.649	World Championships QF
15	Anna Pavlova	(Azerbaijan)	14.583	European Championships EF
16	Yang Tianyi	(China)	14.550	Chinese Championships QF
16	Maria Paseka	(Russia)	14.550	Voronin Cup EF
18	Ksenia Afanasyeva	(Russia)	14.500	Voronin Cup EF
19	Ellie Black	(Canada)	14.483	World Championships QF
19	Dipa Karmakar	(India)	14.483	World Championships QF
19	Pauline Schäfer	(Germany)	14.483	German Championships EF

=== Women's Uneven Bars ===
Rank	Name	Country	Best: Total score	Event
1	Ashton Locklear	(United States)	15.850	US Championships Day 1
2	Yao Jinnan	(China)	15.666	World Championships QF
3	Huang Huidan	(China)	15.566	World Championships EF
4	Becky Downie	(United Kingdom)	15.500	European Championships EF
5	Larrissa Miller	(Australia)	15.475	Australian Championships Day 2
6	Aliya Mustafina	(Russia)	15.400	Russian Cup AA
6	Rebecca Tunney	(United Kingdom)	15.400	British Championships EF
6	Shang Chunsong	(China)	15.400	Chinese Championships AA
6	Madison Kocian	(United States)	15.400	US Championships Day 2
10	Viktoria Komova	(Russia)	15.367	Russian Cup EF
11	Tan Jiaxin	(China)	15.333	World Championships QF
12	Brenna Dowell	(United States)	15.300	US Championships Day 1
13	Daria Spiridonova	(Russia)	15.283	World Championships EF
14	Elizabeth Price	(United States)	15.200	American Cup
15	Lisa Katharina Hill	(Germany)	15.100	World Championships QF
16	Anna Rodionova	(Russia)	15.067	Russian Championships AA
17	Sophie Scheder	(Germany)	15.066	American Cup
18	Jonna Adlerteg	(Sweden)	14.950	Swedish Cup EF
19	Ruby Harrold	(United Kingdom)	14.900	Welsh Championships
20	Larisa Iordache	(Romania)	14.866	World Championships AA

=== Women's Balance Beam ===
Rank	Name	Country	Best: Total score	Event
1	Maria Kharenkova	(Russia)	16.200	Russian Cup AA
2	Simone Biles	(United States)	15.600	US Championships Day 1
3	Aliya Mustafina	(Russia)	15.567	Russian Cup EF
4	Larisa Iordache	(Romania)	15.500	World Championships TF
4	Lauren Mitchell	(Australia)	15.500	Australian Championships Day 2
6	Kyla Ross	(United States)	15.350	US Championships Day 2
7	Andreea Munteanu	(Romania)	15.325	Romanian Championships EF
8	Shang Chunsong	(China)	15.167	Chinese Championships EF
9	Becky Downie	(United Kingdom)	15.150	British Championships EF
9	Alyssa Baumann	(United States)	15.150	US Championships Days 1&2
11	Hannah Whelan	(United Kingdom)	15.050	British Championships EF
12	Bai Yawen	(China)	15.033	World Championships EF
13	Ellie Black	(Canada)	15.000	Pacific Rim Championships AA
13	Asuka Teramoto	(Japan)	15.000	School Championships EF
15	Yu Minobe	(Japan)	14.950	All Japan Senior Championships
16	Xie Yufen	(China)	14.900	Pacific Rim Championships EF
16	Yao Jinnan	(China)	14.900	World Championships QF
18	Rachel Gowey	(United States)	14.850	US Classic
19	Viktoria Kuzmina	(Russia)	14.800	Black Sea Games
20	Daniele Hypólito	(Brazil)	14.775	Meeting Brazil

=== Women's Floor Exercise ===
Rank	Name	Country	Best: Total score	Event
1	Simone Biles	(United States)	15.700	US Classic
2	Larisa Iordache	(Romania)	15.500	Romanian Championships EF
3	Aliya Mustafina	(Russia)	15.100	Russian Championships AA
3	Elizabeth Price	(United States)	15.100	Pacific Rim Championships AA
3	Mykayla Skinner	(United States)	15.100	US Championships Day 2
6	Vanessa Ferrari	(Italy)	15.050	Golden League AA
7	Ksenia Afanasyeva	(Russia)	15.000	Voronin Cup AA
8	Alla Sosnitskaya	(Russia)	14.833	Russian Championships AA
9	Kim Bùi	(Germany)	14.800	German Championships EF
10	Claudia Fragapane	(United Kingdom)	14.766	European Championships QF
11	Shang Chunsong	(China)	14.700	Chinese Championships EF
11	Kyla Ross	(United States)	14.700	US Championships Day 2
13	Victoria Moors	(Canada)	14.633	Tokyo World Cup
13	Roxana Popa	(Spain)	14.633	Spanish Cup
15	Viktoria Kuzmina	(Russia)	14.600	Black Sea Games
16	Giulia Steingruber	(Switzerland)	14.566	European Championships QF
17	Lauren Mitchell	(Australia)	14.550	Australian Championships EF
18	Daria Elizarova	(Russia)	14.467	Russian Cup AA
19	Jessica López	(Venezuela)	14.450	Pan American Championships EF
19	Andreea Munteanu	(Romania)	14.450	Romanian Championships AA

[27]
