= Nicole Hitz =

Swiss artistic gymnast

- Born: 25 April 1997 (age 29) Hutten, Switzerland

Gymnastics career
- Discipline: Women's artistic gymnastics
- Country represented: Switzerland
- Club: TV Rueti
- Head coach: Zoltan Jordanov

Nicole Hitz (born 25 April 1997) is a Swiss artistic gymnast.

== Career ==
Hitz competed at the 2012 Junior European Championships and helped the Swiss team finish 13th. She competed at the 2013 DTB Team Challenge in Stuttgart with Jessica Diacci, Ilaria Käslin, and Sara Metzger, and the team finished 4th while Hitz finished 10th in the all-around.

Hitz competed at the 2014 Cottbus World Cup, but she did not qualify for any event finals. At the 2014 Swiss Championships, she finished 6th in the all-around, 4th on the vault, 6th on the uneven bars, and 4th on the balance beam. She competed at the 2014 World Championships alongside Giulia Steingruber, Caterina Barloggio, Ilaria Käslin, Laura Schulte, and Stefanie Siegenthaler, and they finished 19th in the qualification round. She competed at the 2014 Stuttgart World Cup with Ilaria Käslin, Stefanie Siegenthaler, and Jessica Diacci, and they won the team bronze medal behind Germany and Russia.

Hitz began dealing with back injuries in mid-2015. She finished 5th in the all-around, 4th on the vault, and 5th on the balance beam and the floor exercise at the 2015 Swiss Championships. She then competed at the 2015 World Championships with Giulia Steingruber, Jessica Diacci, Caterina Barloggio, Ilaria Käslin, and Laura Schulte, and they finished 16th in the qualification round, which qualified them for the 2016 Olympic Test Event.

At the 2016 Swiss Championships, Hitz won the bronze medal in the all-around behind Giulia Steingruber and Thea Brogli. Additionally, she won the silver medal on the vault behind Steingruber and the bronze medal on the balance beam and the floor exercise. At the 2019 Swiss Turnfest, she won the bronze medal on vault and finished 6th in the all-around.
