= Laura Schulte =

Swiss artistic gymnast

- Born: 15 April 1997 (age 29)

Gymnastics career
- Discipline: Women's artistic gymnastics
- Country represented: Switzerland
- Club: Kunstturnerinnen Stein-Fricktal
- Head coach: Zoltan Jordanov
- Retired: 2016

Laura Schulte (born 15 April 1997) is a Swiss former artistic gymnast. She is a FIG World Cup bronze medalist on the uneven bars.

== Career ==
Schulte competed at the 2012 Junior European Championships and helped the Swiss team finish 13th. She made her senior debut at the 2013 City of Jesolo Trophy and the Swiss team finished 5th. Individually, she finished 5th in the uneven bars event final. She competed at the 2013 European Championships where she finished 25th in the all-around during the qualification round.

At the 2014 FIG World Cup in Doha and won the bronze medal on the uneven bars behind Kristýna Pálešová and Jana Šikulová. She competed at the 2014 European Championships with Ilaria Käslin, Giulia Steingruber, Stefanie Siegenthaler, and Nadia Muelhauser, and they finished 8th in the team final. At the 2014 Swiss Championships, she finished 5th in the all-around and won the silver medal on the vault and the floor exercise and the bronze medal on the uneven bars. She competed at the 2014 World Championships alongside Giulia Steingruber, Caterina Barloggio, Ilaria Käslin, Nicole Hitz, and Stefanie Siegenthaler, and they finished 19th in the qualification round.

Schulte had surgery on her left foot in May 2015 and did not train for six weeks. She returned to competition at the 2015 Swiss Championships in September and won the bronze medal in the all-around behind Giulia Steingruber and Ilaria Käslin. She then competed at the 2015 World Championships with Steingruber, Käslin, Jessica Diacci, Caterina Barloggio, and Nicole Hitz, and they finished 16th in the qualification round, which qualified them for the 2016 Olympic Test Event.

At the 2016 Olympic Test Event, Schulte competed with Thea Brogli, Ilaria Käslin, Caterina Barloggio, Stefanie Siegenthaler, and Giulia Steingruber, and they placed 6th- which meant they failed to qualify as a full team for the 2016 Olympic Games. She then retired from gymnastics.
