= Caterina Barloggio =

Swiss artistic gymnast (born 1996)

- Born: 29 August 1996 (age 30) Lavertezzo, Switzerland

Gymnastics career
- Discipline: Women's artistic gymnastics
- Country represented: Switzerland
- Club: SFG Sementina
- Head coach: Fabien Martin
- Retired: 2020

Caterina Barloggio (born 29 August 1996) is a Swiss former artistic gymnast. She competed in three European Championships and four World Championships.

== Personal life ==
Caterina Barloggio was born on 29 August 1996 in Lavertezzo. She graduated from the Federal High School of Sports in Macolin, and she speaks English, French, German, and Italian.

== Gymnastics career ==
Barloggio competed at the 2012 European Championships and helped the Swiss team finish 11th in the qualification round.

At the 2014 FIG World Cup in Osijek, Barloggio competed on the floor exercise and finished 13th in the qualification round. She won the silver medal in the all-around at the 2014 Swiss Championships behind Giulia Steingruber. She competed at the 2014 World Championships alongside Steingruber, Nicole Hitz, Ilaria Käslin, Laura Schulte, and Stefanie Siegenthaler, and they finished 19th in the qualification round.

At the 2015 Cottbus World Cup, Barloggio finished 6th on the uneven bars and on the balance beam. She then competed at the 2015 European Championships and finished 24th in the all-around during the qualification round, but she did not qualify for the all-around final due to the two-per-country rule as she finished behind Giulia Steingruber and Jessica Diacci. She then competed for Switzerland at the 2015 European Games alongside Steingruber and Diacci, and they finished 6th in the team competition. At the 2015 Swiss Championships, she won the bronze medal on the uneven bars and finished 6th in the all-around. She then competed at the 2015 World Championships with Steingruber, Diacci, Nicole Hitz, Ilaria Käslin, and Laura Schulte, and they finished 16th in the qualification round, which qualified them for the 2016 Olympic Test Event.

At the 2016 Olympic Test Event, Barloggio competed with Thea Brogli, Ilaria Käslin, Laura Schulte, Stefanie Siegenthaler, and Giulia Steingruber, and they placed 6th- which meant they failed to qualify as a full team for the 2016 Olympic Games. The same team except for Schulte then competed at the 2016 European Championships where they finished 4th behind Russia, Great Britain, and France. She competed at the 2017 Summer Universiade, but she did not qualify for any event finals.

At the 2018 Swiss Championships, Barloggio won the silver medal on the balance beam behind Ilaria Käslin. She then competed at the 2018 World Championships with Käslin, Leonie Meier, Stefanie Siegenthaler, and Anina Wildi, and they finished 21st in the qualification round. She competed at the Arthur Gander Memorial and won the silver medal on the balance beam behind Flavia Saraiva.

Barloggio competed at the 2019 Swiss Championships, and she won the silver medal on the uneven bars behind Stefanie Siegenthaler and on the floor exercise behind Giulia Steingruber. She then competed at the 2019 World Championships with Siegenthaler, Steingruber, Ilaria Käslin, and Anny Wu, and they finished 17th in the qualification round.

Barloggio retired on 15 October 2020 in order to concentrate on her studies.
