= Jessica Diacci =

Swiss artistic gymnast

- Nickname: Jessy
- Born: 13 January 1994 (age 32) Zurich, Switzerland

Gymnastics career
- Discipline: Women's artistic gymnastics
- Country represented: Switzerland
- Club: Kutu-Obersiggenthal
- Head coach: Fabien Martin
- Retired: 2018

Jessica Diacci (born 13 January 1994) is a Swiss former artistic gymnast.

== Gymnastics career ==
Diacci competed at the 2010 European Championships alongside Giulia Steingruber, Ariella Käslin, and Jennifer Senn, and they finished 6th in the team final. She won the bronze medal on the floor exercise at the 2010 Cottbus World Cup behind Kristina Vaculik and Marta Pihan-Kulesza. She then competed at the 2010 World Championships with Ariella Käslin, Giulia Steingruber, Jennifer Senn, Linda Stämpfli, and Jennifer Rutz, and they finished 16th in the qualification round. She also competed at the 2011 World Championships where the Swiss team finished 18th.

At the 2012 Osijek World Cup, Diacci won the bronze medal on the balance beam behind Giulia Steingruber and Vasiliki Millousi. She competed at the 2012 European Championships and helped the Swiss team finish 11th in the qualification round.

Diacci competed at the 2013 City of Jesolo Trophy, and the Swiss team finished 5th. Individually, she finished 7th in the balance beam event final. At the 2013 Doha World Cup, she finished 7th in the balance beam event final. She competed at the 2013 European Championships where she finished 31st in the all-around during the qualification round. She competed at the 2013 DTB Team Challenge in Stuttgart with Nicole Hitz, Ilaria Käslin, and Sara Metzger, and the team finished 4th. She won the bronze medal on vault at the 2014 Swiss Championships. She competed at the 2014 Stuttgart World Cup with Ilaria Käslin, Stefanie Siegenthaler, and Nicole Hitz, and they won the team bronze medal behind Germany and Russia.

At the 2015 FIG World Cup in Doha, Diacci won the bronze medal on the uneven bars behind Youna Dufournet and Diana Bulimar. She competed at the 2015 European Championships and finished 21st in the all-around final. She then competed for Switzerland at the 2015 European Games alongside Giulia Steingruber and Caterina Barloggio, and they finished 6th in the team competition. At the 2015 Swiss Championships, she won the silver medal on the vault, uneven bars, and balance beam and finished 4th in the all-around. She then competed at the 2015 World Championships with Giulia Steingruber, Caterina Barloggio, Nicole Hitz, Ilaria Käslin, and Laura Schulte, and they finished 16th in the qualification round, which qualified them for the 2016 Olympic Test Event.

Diacci had surgery for a shoulder injury in April 2016. At the 2017 Swiss Championships, she won the bronze medal in the all-around behind Giulia Steingruber and Fabienne Studer. At the 2018 Swiss Championships, she won the bronze medal on the uneven bars. She retired after the 2018 Swiss Championships due to a foot injury.
