= Adrienn Varga =

Hungarian artistic gymnast

- Born: 6 August 1980 (age 46) Gyula, Békes, Hungary

Gymnastics career
- Discipline: Women's artistic gymnastics
- Country represented: Hungary
- Club: Torna Club Bekescsaba
Medal record
European Championships
Gold medal – first place	1998 St Petersburg	Vault

Adrienn Varga (born 6 August 1980) is a Hungarian former artistic gymnast. She competed at the 1996 Summer Olympics. Varga won a gold medal on vault at the 1998 European Championships.

== Eponymous skill ==
Varga has an uneven bars dismount named after her in the Code of Points.

Apparatus	Name	Description
Uneven bars	Varga	Salto backwards laid out with half turn into front pike with half turn
