= 2014 Stuttgart World Cup =

The 2014 Stuttgart World Cup, also known as the EnBW Turn-WeltCup, was an artistic gymnastics competition held from November 28–30 in Stuttgart, Germany. The competition included a team and a separate individual all-around competition that was part of the 2014 FIG World Cup series.

== Medalists ==
Event	Gold	Silver	Bronze
Team all-around	Germany; Pauline Schaefer; Sophie Scheder; Michelle Timm; Nadja Schulze	Russia; Ekaterina Kramarenko; Polina Fedorova; Ksenia Afanasyeva	Switzerland; Ilaria Kaeslin; Stefanie Siegenthaler; Jessica Diacci; Nicole Hitz
All-Around	Larisa Iordache (ROU)	Jessica López (VEN)	Kim Bui (GER)

== Results ==
=== Team final ===
Rank	Team	Vault (gymnastics)	Uneven bars	Balance beam	Floor (gymnastics)	Total
1st place, gold medalist(s)	Germany	28.966	28.466	28.566	26.700	112.698
1st place, gold medalist(s)	Pauline Schaefer	14.733	13.333	14.600	14.000	112.698
1st place, gold medalist(s)	Sophie Scheder		15.133	13.966		112.698
1st place, gold medalist(s)	Michelle Timm	14.233	9.900	12.000	12.700	112.698
1st place, gold medalist(s)	Nadja Schulze	13.333			11.200	112.698
2nd place, silver medalist(s)	Russia	29.166	28.133	25.966	27.533	110.831
2nd place, silver medalist(s)	Ekaterina Kramarenko	14.166	14.600	12.833	13.433	110.831
2nd place, silver medalist(s)	Polina Fedorova	13.600	13.533	13.133	13.533	110.831
2nd place, silver medalist(s)	Ksenia Afanasyeva	15.000			14.033	110.831
3rd place, bronze medalist(s)	Switzerland	27.432	24.666	26.566	26.433	105.097
3rd place, bronze medalist(s)	Jessica Diacci	13.133	12.100	12.600	12.833	105.097
3rd place, bronze medalist(s)	Ilaria Kaeslin	14.166	12.000	13.766	13.600	105.097
3rd place, bronze medalist(s)	Nicole Hitz	13.266				105.097
3rd place, bronze medalist(s)	Stefanie Siegenthaler		12.566	12.800	12.533	105.097
4	Swabia	26.566	20.632	21.400	24.800	93.398
4	Nicole Fritz		10.366			93.398
4	Dorothee Henzler	13.333	10.066	10.600	12.600	93.398
4	Sarina Maier	13.233	10.266	10.800	12.200	93.398

=== All-around ===
Position	Gymnast	Vault (gymnastics)	Uneven bars	Balance beam	Floor (gymnastics)	Total
1st place, gold medalist(s)	Larisa Iordache (ROU)	15.133	14.700	15.333	14.600	59.766
2nd place, silver medalist(s)	Jessica López (VEN)	14.600	14.833	14.200	14.166	57.799
3rd place, bronze medalist(s)	Kim Bui (GER)	14.133	14.600	13.666	14.266	56.665
4	Vanessa Ferrari (ITA)	13.800	13.933	14.333	14.366	56.432
5	Aliya Mustafina (RUS)	15.000	13.833	13.600	13.966	56.399
6	Alla Sosnitskaya (RUS)	14.333	14.000	12.933	14.100	55.366
7	Elsabeth Black (CAN)	13.933	13.733	13.700	13.833	55.199
8	Lisa Katharina Hill (GER)	13.933	14.966	12.700	13.266	54.865
