= Noémi Makra =

Hungarian artistic gymnast

- Born: 18 November 1997 (age 28) Bèkèscsaba, Hungary

Gymnastics career
- Discipline: Women's artistic gymnastics
- Country represented: Hungary (2012–2020)
- Club: Torna Club Békéscsaba
- Music: 2012-2014: Atlanta by Bond
- Retired: 2021
Medal record
Women's artistic gymnastics
Representing Hungary
FIG World Cup
Event	1st	2nd	3rd
Apparatus World Cup	1	3	2
World Challenge Cup	1	0	1
Total	2	3	3

Noémi Makra (born 18 November 1997) is a Hungarian retired artistic gymnast. She is a two-time gold medalist on the FIG World Cup series and a two-time World all-around finalist. She is the 2014 and 2019 Hungarian national all-around champion.

== Gymnastics career ==
=== Junior ===
Makra made her international debut at the 2011 European Youth Summer Olympic Festival where she won gold on the uneven bars. At the 2012 Junior European Championships, she placed tenth with her team, ninth in the all-around, and eighth on vault.

=== Senior ===
Makra made her senior debut at the 2013 European Championships where she placed eleventh in the all-around. She was the third reserve for the floor final. At the 2013 Ljubljana World Cup, she won gold on floor, silver on uneven bars, and silver on beam. She placed fourth on bars at the Anadia World Challenge Cup. At the Osijek World Challenge Cup, she finished fourth on beam and floor, fifth on vault, and sixth on bars. At the 2013 World Championships, Makra finished fourteenth in the all-around final. She was also the first reserve for the floor final.

At the 2014 Cottbus World Cup, Makra won a bronze on bars, and finished fourth on vault. She also won a gold medal on beam, beating Maria Kharenkova and Andreea Munteanu. At the 2014 Osijek World Cup, she won a silver on uneven bars. Makra finished eighth on vault at the 2014 European Championships. At the end of August, Makra competed at the Hungarian National Championships in Budapest, where she swept the gold medals.

Makra represented Hungary at the 2015 European Games and finished fourth in the uneven bars final. She advanced to the all-around final at the 2015 World Championships and finished 21st after falling off the balance beam. She competed at the 2016 Olympic Test Event despite dealing with a knee injury and finished 49th in the all-around. Because her teammate Zsófia Kovács finished 14th, Hungary received an Olympic berth. Kovács was eventually chosen to compete at the Olympic Games over Makra. She competed with the Hungarian team that placed eighth at the 2016 European Championships.

Makra missed most of the 2017 season due to various injuries. She returned to international competition at the 2018 Osijek World Challenge Cup and won a bronze medal on the uneven bars. She helped Hungary advance into the team final at the 2018 European Championships, where they finished eighth. She was selected for the 2018 World Championships with Dorina Böczögő, Nóra Fehér, Zsofia Kovacs, and Sára Péter, and they finished 17th in the team qualification round.

Makra won the all-around title at the 2019 Hungarian Championships. She then won a gold medal on the balance beam at the 2019 Szombathely World Challenge Cup. She competed at the 2019 World Championships, and the Hungarian team of Böczögő, Péter, Kovács, and Bianka Schermann finished 18th.

Makra became sick with COVID-19 in October 2020 and, as a result, missed the 2020 European Championships. She announced her retirement from the sport in January 2021.

== Competitive history ==
Competitive history of Noémi Makra
Year	Event	Team	AA	VT	UB	BB	FX
2011	European Youth Olympic Festival				1st place, gold medalist(s)		
2012
2012	Junior European Championships	10	9	8			
2013
2013	European Championships		11				
2013	Ljubljana World Cup				2nd place, silver medalist(s)	2nd place, silver medalist(s)	1st place, gold medalist(s)
2013	Anadia World Challenge Cup				4		
2013	Hungarian Grand Prix		1st place, gold medalist(s)	1st place, gold medalist(s)	1st place, gold medalist(s)	2nd place, silver medalist(s)	
2013	Osijek World Challenge Cup			5	6	4	4
2013	World Championships		14				
2013	Gymnasiade		4	7	1st place, gold medalist(s)		4
2014	Cottbus World Cup			4	3rd place, bronze medalist(s)	1st place, gold medalist(s)	
2014	Osijek World Cup			4	2nd place, silver medalist(s)		7
2014	European Championships			8			
2014	Hungarian Championships		1st place, gold medalist(s)	1st place, gold medalist(s)	1st place, gold medalist(s)	1st place, gold medalist(s)	1st place, gold medalist(s)
2015	Hungarian Event Championships				3rd place, bronze medalist(s)		
2015	European Games	9			4		
2015	Hungarian Championships		3rd place, bronze medalist(s)	3rd place, bronze medalist(s)	1st place, gold medalist(s)	4	3rd place, bronze medalist(s)
2015	World Championships		21				
2015	Toyota International			12	3rd place, bronze medalist(s)	2nd place, silver medalist(s)	5
2016	Olympic Test Event		49				
2016	European Championships	8					
2016	Anadia World Challenge Cup				7		
2016	Győr Trophy		6		3rd place, bronze medalist(s)		5
2018	Elek Matolay Memorial		7		2nd place, silver medalist(s)		3rd place, bronze medalist(s)
2018	Osijek World Challenge Cup				3rd place, bronze medalist(s)		
2018	Koper World Challenge Cup				8		
2018	Budapest Friendly	1st place, gold medalist(s)					
2018	Hungarian Event Championships				3rd place, bronze medalist(s)	4	
2018	European Championships	8					
2018	Hungarian Championships					4	2nd place, silver medalist(s)
2018	Hungarian Masters Championships		3rd place, bronze medalist(s)		5	2nd place, silver medalist(s)	5
2019	Hungarian League Championships				2nd place, silver medalist(s)	1st place, gold medalist(s)	3rd place, bronze medalist(s)
2019	DTB Team Challenge	7					
2019	Elek Matolay Memorial				4	2nd place, silver medalist(s)	2nd place, silver medalist(s)
2019	Gym Festival Trnava		3rd place, bronze medalist(s)		3rd place, bronze medalist(s)	1st place, gold medalist(s)	1st place, gold medalist(s)
2019	Hungarian Championships		1st place, gold medalist(s)	2nd place, silver medalist(s)	3rd place, bronze medalist(s)	2nd place, silver medalist(s)	3rd place, bronze medalist(s)
2019	Szombathely World Challenge Cup					1st place, gold medalist(s)	7
2019	2nd Heerenveen Friendly	4					
2019	Hungarian Master Championships		3rd place, bronze medalist(s)		2nd place, silver medalist(s)	1st place, gold medalist(s)	
2020	Szombathely World Challenge Cup					6	5
2020	Hungarian Championships		4		4	4	2nd place, silver medalist(s)
