= Victoria Moors =

Canadian artistic gymnast

- Full name: Victoria Ashley Moors
- Born: November 5, 1996 (age 30) Surrey, British Columbia

Gymnastics career
- Discipline: Women's artistic gymnastics
- Country represented: Canada
- Club: Dynamo Gymnastics
- Head coach: Elvira Saadi
- Assistant coach: Valdimir Kondratenko
- Music: "Torn" by Nathan Lanier (2014) "Assassin's Tango" by John Powell (2011–2012 & Oct 2013 at the 2013 World Championships), Artsakh by Ara Gevorgian (Nov 2012-Sept 2013)
- Eponymous skills: Floor Exercise: Double Twisting (720 degrees) Double Layout
- Retired: May 31, 2015
- World ranking: All Around 4 (2014) Beam 31 (2012) Floor 6 (2012)
Medal record
Representing Canada
Pacific Rim Championships
Bronze medal – third place	2012 Seattle	Team
Pan American Championships
Silver medal – second place	2013 San Juan	Floor Exercise

Victoria Ashley Moors (born November 5, 1996) is a retired Canadian artistic gymnast who represented her country at the 2012 Summer Olympics. She is the older sister of 2020 Olympic gymnast Brooklyn Moors.

== Junior career ==
=== 2010 ===
In December, Moors competed at Elite Canada in Gatineau, Quebec. She won the all-around competition with a score of 53.100. In event finals, Moors placed first on vault, scoring 13.450; first on uneven bars, scoring 13.400; and first on floor, scoring 15.250.

=== 2011 ===
In May, Moors won the all-around title at the Canadian Championships in Charlottetown, Prince Edward Island, with a score of 56.925. In event finals, she placed third on vault, scoring 13.625; first on uneven bars, scoring 13.925; and first on floor, scoring 15.425.

Moors left the Cambridge Kips gymnastics club to move to Dynamo Gymnastics, a new club opened by her longtime coach, Elvira Saadi.

== Senior career ==
=== 2012 ===
In January, Moors competed at the London Prepares series, where Canada placed second and qualified a full team to the 2012 Summer Olympics. She contributed an all-around score of 54.282 and placed second in the floor final with a score of 14.200.

In February, Moors competed at Elite Canada in Mississauga, Ontario. She placed third in the all-around competition with a score of 55.050, third in the uneven bars final with a score of 13.300, and first in the floor final with a score of 14.650.

At the beginning of March, Moors placed fourth at the American Cup in New York City with an all-around score of 56.365.

Later in March, Moors competed at the Pacific Rim Championships in Everett, Washington. She contributed to the Canadian team's bronze medal with an all-around score of 54.850. Individually, she placed sixth in the floor final with a score of 13.250.

In April, Moors won the silver medal in the floor final at the Artistic Gymnastics World Cup in Zibo, China, with a score of 14.025.

In May, Moors competed at the Canadian Championships in Regina, Saskatchewan. She tied for the silver medal in the all-around competition with a score of 56.300. In event finals, Moors placed second on uneven bars, scoring 13.650, and first on floor, scoring 14.600.

That summer, Moors hoped to be chosen as part of the five-member team that would represent Canada at the 2012 Summer Olympics. After she helped Canada qualify a full team in January, Moors said, "I never really thought about it. Now, I have my mind set and I'm motivated to get to the Olympics. I really want to go."

At the end of June, Moors was one of the twelve gymnasts chosen to compete at the Final Olympic Selection meet in Gatineau, Quebec. On the first day of competition, she placed second in the all-around with a score of 55.000. Based on her performances here and at the Canadian Championships, she was selected to the five-member Olympic team. Moors said, "I'm just so excited to be going to the Olympics. I've been doing my floor routine for several years, and it's just a case of practice makes perfect. I'm still working to make it better."

==== London Olympics ====
At the end of July, Moors competed at the 2012 Summer Olympics in London, United Kingdom. She contributed scores of 13.700 on uneven bars and 14.600 on floor toward the Canadian team's fifth-place finish. Moors said, "Our goal was to just finish top eight. But coming to the Olympics and finishing fifth, we weren't expecting that. It's unreal right now. We upset a lot of big countries. We definitely raised the bar for Canada; we're leaving a trail for the next people, and for Rio. We just decided to go out there and go strong."

=== 2013 ===
In March, Moors competed for Canada in the FIG World Cup event in Worcester, Massachusetts, known as the American Cup. She got the highest score among the women on the floor during competition with a score of 14.600 and won the bronze medal behind American gymnasts Katelyn Ohashi and Simone Biles with an all-around score of 57.066. In August, Moors was the first female gymnast to perform a double-twisting double layout in international competition during her floor exercise routine at the Pan American Senior Apparatus Championship. At the 2013 World Artistic Gymnastics Championships in October, she finished 10th in the all-around.

The double-twisting double layout skill on floor exercise is now called the "Moors" in the Code of Points. It is currently the only "I" skill in the code of points and has a difficulty of 0.9. Since Moors debuted the skill, relatively few other gymnasts have successfully competed it, except for Brits Amy Tinkler and Jessica Gadirova as well as Americans MyKayla Skinner, Jade Carey, Simone Biles, Morgan Hurd, and Joscelyn Roberson.

=== 2014 ===
In January, Moors was announced as a competitor for the 2014 American Cup (Greensboro, North Carolina) in early March. Then, in early February, she was announced as a competitor for the Tokyo World Cup in April.

In February, Moors competed at Elite Canada in Gatineau, Quebec. She won the all-around competition with a total score of 56.250 and qualified for the bars final, where she scored 13.225 and tied for the fourth place with Victoria-Kayen Woo, and for the beam final, where she scored 10.850 and came seventh. She also qualified for the floor final, but she didn't compete.

=== 2015 ===
On 31 May 2015, Victoria announced her retirement from the sport via an Instagram post

== Eponymous skills ==
Moors has two eponymous skills listed in the Code of Points.

Apparatus	Name	Description	Difficulty (Note: Valid for the 2025–2028 Code of Points)	When Added to the Code of Points
Uneven bars	Moors	Underswing with laid-out salto forward with 1/2 turn	D (0.4)	2012 Olympic Games
Floor exercise	Moors	Double-twisting (2/1) double laid out salto backwards	I (0.9)	2013 World Championships

== Competitive History ==
Year	Event	Team	AA	VT	UB	BB	FX
2008	Elite Canada		6				1st place, gold medalist(s)
2009	Canadian Novice National Championships		1st place, gold medalist(s)	4	2nd place, silver medalist(s)	1st place, gold medalist(s)	1st place, gold medalist(s)
2010	Elite Canada		1st place, gold medalist(s)	1st place, gold medalist(s)	1st place, gold medalist(s)		1st place, gold medalist(s)
2011	Canadian Junior National Championships		1st place, gold medalist(s)	3rd place, bronze medalist(s)	1st place, gold medalist(s)		1st place, gold medalist(s)
2012	London Test Event	2nd place, silver medalist(s)					2nd place, silver medalist(s)
2012	Elite Canada		3rd place, bronze medalist(s)		3rd place, bronze medalist(s)		1st place, gold medalist(s)
2012	American Cup		4				
2012	Pacific Rim Championships	3rd place, bronze medalist(s)					6
2012	Canadian National Championships		2nd place, silver medalist(s)		2nd place, silver medalist(s)		1st place, gold medalist(s)
2012	Olympic Games	5					
2013	American Cup		3rd place, bronze medalist(s)	2nd place, silver medalist(s)	7	3rd place, bronze medalist(s)	1st place, gold medalist(s)
2013	Canadian National Championships						5
2013	Pan American Championships					5	2nd place, silver medalist(s)
2013	World Championships		10				
2014	Elite Canada		1st place, gold medalist(s)		4	7	
2014	American Cup		4				
2014	Tokyo World Cup		4				
2014	Canadian National Championships		3rd place, bronze medalist(s)		3rd place, bronze medalist(s)		1st place, gold medalist(s)
