= Torna Club Békéscsaba =

Gymnastics facility in Békéscsaba, Hungary

Torna Club Békéscsaba is a gymnastics facility in Békéscsaba, Hungary.

The head coaches are Juliet and Michael Unyatinszki.

== History ==
Békéscsaba has produced many Olympians and National Champions.

== Notable gymnasts & alumni ==
- Henrietta Ónodi - 1992 Olympic Vault Champion, 1992 World Vault Champion
- Adrienn Varga - 1995 Hungarian Team Member
- Adrienne Nyeste - 2000 Olympian
- Ildiko Balog - 1992 and 1996 Olympian
- Angela Strifler - 2001 European Hungarian Team Member
- Renáta Kiss - 2002 and 2003 World Hungarian Team Member
- Enikő Korcsmáros - 2008 European Team Member, 2007 European Vault Finalist
- Dorina Böczögő - 2008 and 2012 Olympian
- Noémi Makra - 2013 European All-around Finalist
