= 2014 FIG Artistic Gymnastics World Cup series =

International gymnastics competition series

FIG Artistic Gymnastics World Cup series
- Location: various — see locations
- Date: March 1 – December 6, 2014 see schedule

The 2014 FIG Artistic Gymnastics World Cup series was a series of stages where events in men's and women's artistic gymnastics were contested.

== World Cup stages ==
Date	Event	Location	Type
1 March	American Cup	Greensboro, United States	C II – All Around
13–16 March	Turnier der Meister World Challenge Cup	Cottbus, Germany	C III – Apparatus
26–28 March	Doha World Challenge Cup	Doha, Qatar	C III – Apparatus
5–6 April	Tokyo Cup	Tokyo, Japan	C II – All Around
17–20 April	Ljubljana World Challenge Cup	Ljubljana, Slovenia	C III – Apparatus
25–27 April	Osijek World Challenge Cup	Osijek, Croatia	C III – Apparatus
29 May – 1 June	Anadia World Challenge Cup	Anadia, Portugal	C III – Apparatus
23–24 August	Ghent World Challenge Cup (canceled)	Ghent, Belgium	C III – Apparatus
5–7 September	Medellín World Challenge Cup	Medellín, Colombia	C III – Apparatus
29 November – 30 November	DTB-Pokal World Cup	Stuttgart, Germany	C II – All Around
6 December	Glasgow World Cup	Glasgow, United Kingdom	C II – All Around

== Medalists ==
=== Men ===
Competition	Event	Gold	Silver	Bronze
Greensboro	All-around	(United States) Sam Mikulak	(Japan) Shogo Nonomura	(United Kingdom) Daniel Purvis
Cottbus	Floor exercise	(Russia) Denis Ablyazin	(Switzerland) Claudio Capelli	(Brazil) Diego Hypólito
Cottbus	Pommel horse	(Hungary) Krisztián Berki	(Japan) Kohei Kameyama	(Croatia) Robert Seligman
Cottbus	Rings	(Russia) Denis Ablyazin	(Greece) Eleftherios Petrounias	(Russia) Aleksandr Balandin (Japan) Koji Yamamuro
Cottbus	Vault	(Finland) Tomi Tuuha	(Brazil) Diego Hypólito	(Spain) Rayderley Zapata
Cottbus	Parallel bars	(Japan) Koji Uematsu	(United Kingdom) Frank Baines	(Slovenia) Mitja Petkovšek
Cottbus	Horizontal bar	(Germany) Andreas Bretschneider	(Brazil) Petrix Barbosa	(Switzerland) Oliver Hegi
Doha	Floor exercise	(Japan) Kenzo Shirai	(United States) Paul Ruggeri	(China) Peng Wang
Doha	Pommel horse	(Armenia) Harutyun Merdinyan	(Croatia) Robert Seligman	(Slovenia) Sašo Bertoncelj
Doha	Rings	(Armenia) Artur Tovmasyan	(Armenia) Vahagn Davtyan (Brazil) Henrique Flores	None awarded
Doha	Vault	(Armenia) Artur Davtyan	(Japan) Yusuke Saito	(Japan) Kenzo Shirai
Doha	Parallel bars	(Netherlands) Epke Zonderland (Germany) Marcel Nguyen	None awarded	(Slovenia) Mitja Petkovšek
Doha	Horizontal bar	(Netherlands) Epke Zonderland	(United States) Paul Ruggeri	(Belarus) Dzmitry Barkalau
Tokyo	All-around	(Japan) Kohei Uchimura	(Germany) Fabian Hambuechen	(Japan) Ryohei Kato
Ljubljana	Floor exercise	(Netherlands) Casimir Schmidt	(Croatia) Tomislav Markovic	(Israel) Alexander Shatilov
Ljubljana	Pommel horse	(Ukraine) Oleg Verniaiev	(Croatia) Filip Ude	(Belarus) Vasili Mikhalitsyn
Ljubljana	Rings	(Netherlands) Yuri van Gelder	(United Kingdom) Courtney Tulloch	(France) Danny Rodrigues
Ljubljana	Vault	(Belarus) Pavel Bulauski	(Israel) Andrey Medvedev	(Netherlands) Casimir Schmidt
Ljubljana	Parallel bars	(Ukraine) Oleg Verniaiev	(Netherlands) Epke Zonderland	(Slovenia) Alen Dimic
Ljubljana	Horizontal bar	(Netherlands) Epke Zonderland	(Netherlands) Bart Deurloo	(Belarus) Aliaksandr Tsarevich
Osijek	Floor exercise	(Croatia) Tomislav Markovic	(Israel) Alexander Shatilov (Germany) Matthias Fahrig	None awarded
Osijek	Pommel horse	(Croatia) Filip Ude	(Italy) Alberto Busnari	(Croatia) Robert Seligman
Osijek	Rings	(Italy) Matteo Morandi	(North Korea) Ri Se-gwang	(Turkey) İbrahim Çolak
Osijek	Vault	(Finland) Tomi Tuuha	(North Korea) Ri Se-gwang (Germany) Matthias Fahrig	None awarded
Osijek	Parallel bars	(Slovenia) Mitja Petkovšek	(Vietnam) Phạm Phước Hưng	(Azerbaijan) Oleg Stepko
Osijek	Horizontal bar	(Croatia) Marijo Možnik (Israel) Alexander Shatilov	None awarded	(United Kingdom) Reiss Beckford
Anadia	Floor exercise	(United States) Eddie Penev	(United States) Sam Mikulak	(Chile) Tomás González
Anadia	Pommel horse	(United States) Alexander Naddour	(Hungary) Zoltán Kállai	(Latvia) Dmitrijs Trefilovs
Anadia	Rings	(Brazil) Arthur Zanetti	(United States) Alexander Naddour	(Finland) Markku Vahtila
Anadia	Vault	(United States) Eddie Penev	(Dominican Republic) Audris Nin Reyes	(China) Qu Ruiyang
Anadia	Parallel bars	(France) Kevin Antoniotti	(Slovenia) Mitja Petkovšek	(United States) Sam Mikulak
Anadia	Horizontal bar	(United States) Sam Mikulak	(Croatia) Marijo Možnik	(Brazil) Francisco Barreto
Ghent	Not held			
Medellín	Floor exercise	(Brazil) Diego Hypólito	(Japan) Toshiya Ikejiri	(Slovenia) Ziga Silc
Medellín	Pommel horse	(Colombia) Jhonny Muñoz	(Croatia) Robert Seligman	(Colombia) Jorge Hugo Giraldo
Medellín	Rings	(Brazil) Henrique Flores	(Argentina) Federico Molinari (Venezuela) Regulo Carmona	None awarded
Medellín	Vault	(Brazil) Diego Hypólito	(Dominican Republic) Audris Nin Reyes	(Brazil) Miguel Hudson
Medellín	Parallel bars	(Colombia) Jossimar Calvo	(Japan) Ryoma Kawamoto	(Slovenia) Alen Dimic
Medellín	Horizontal bar	(Argentina) Nicolás Córdoba	(Colombia) Jhonny Muñoz	(Slovenia) Alen Dimic
Stuttgart	All-around	(Ukraine) Oleg Verniaiev	(Brazil) Sérgio Sasaki	(United States) Donnell Whittenburg
Glasgow	All-around	(Ukraine) Oleg Verniaiev	(Japan) Yusuke Tanaka	(United States) John Orozco

=== Women ===
Competition	Event	Gold	Silver	Bronze
Greensboro	All-around	(United States) Elizabeth Price	(United States) Brenna Dowell	(Switzerland) Giulia Steingruber
Cottbus	Vault	(Germany) Janine Berger	(Germany) Kim Bùi	(Poland) Paula Plichta
Cottbus	Uneven bars	(Germany) Sophie Scheder	(Russia) Anna Rodionova	(Hungary) Noémi Makra
Cottbus	Balance beam	(Hungary) Noémi Makra	(Russia) Maria Kharenkova	(Romania) Andreea Munteanu
Cottbus	Floor exercise	(Poland) Marta Pihan-Kulesza	(Germany) Kim Bùi	(Russia) Maria Kharenkova
Doha	Vault	(Romania) Larisa Iordache	(Slovenia) Teja Belak	(Hong Kong) Angel Hiu Ying Wong
Doha	Uneven bars	(Czech Republic) Kristýna Pálešová	(Czech Republic) Jana Šikulová	(Switzerland) Laura Schulte
Doha	Balance beam	(Romania) Larisa Iordache	(Australia) Mary-Anne Monckton	(Vietnam) Phan Thị Hà Thanh
Doha	Floor exercise	(Romania) Larisa Iordache	(Romania) Diana Bulimar	(Canada) Isabela Onyshko
Tokyo	All-around	(Italy) Vanessa Ferrari	(Spain) Roxana Popa	(United States) Maggie Nichols
Ljubljana	Vault	(Slovenia) Teja Belak	(Croatia) Ana Derek	(Argentina) Ayelén Tarabini
Ljubljana	Uneven bars	(Azerbaijan) Anna Pavlova	(Belarus) Anastasiya Yekimenka	(Switzerland) Stefanie Siegenthaler
Ljubljana	Balance beam	(Slovenia) Teja Belak	(Austria) Jessica Stabinger	(Switzerland) Stefanie Siegenthaler
Ljubljana	Floor exercise	(Argentina) Ayelén Tarabini (Slovenia) Saša Golob	None awarded	(Kazakhstan) Ekaterina Chuikina
Osijek	Vault	(Vietnam) Phan Thị Hà Thanh	(Switzerland) Giulia Steingruber	(Slovenia) Teja Belak
Osijek	Uneven bars	(North Korea) Kang Yong-mi	(Hungary) Noémi Makra	(Sweden) Kim Singmuang
Osijek	Balance beam	(Vietnam) Phan Thị Hà Thanh	(North Korea) Kim Un-hyang	(Switzerland) Giulia Steingruber
Osijek	Floor exercise	(Switzerland) Giulia Steingruber	(Canada) Isabela Onyshko	(Vietnam) Phan Thị Hà Thanh
Anadia	Vault	(Slovenia) Teja Belak	(Austria) Elisa Haemmerle	(Portugal) Ana Filipa Martins
Anadia	Uneven bars	(Venezuela) Jessica López	(Portugal) Ana Filipa Martins	(Uzbekistan) Asal Saparbaeva (Austria) Elisa Haemmerle
Anadia	Balance beam	(Venezuela) Jessica López	(Slovenia) Teja Belak	(Portugal) Diana Abrantes
Anadia	Floor exercise	(Portugal) Ana Filipa Martins	(Austria) Jasmin Mader	(Uzbekistan) Elena Rega
Ghent	Not held			
Medellín	Vault	(Dominican Republic) Yamilet Peña	(Croatia) Ana Derek	(Panama) Isabella Amado
Medellín	Uneven bars	(Portugal) Ana Filipa Martins	(Colombia) Marcela Sandoval	(Colombia) Bibiana Vélez
Medellín	Balance beam	(Panama) Isabella Amado	(Colombia) Marcela Sandoval	(Slovenia) Tjasa Kyselef
Medellín	Floor exercise	(Peru) Mariana Chiarella	(Slovenia) Saša Golob	(Portugal) Ana Filipa Martins
Stuttgart	All-around	(Romania) Larisa Iordache	(Venezuela) Jessica López	(Germany) Kim Bùi
Glasgow	All-around	(Romania) Larisa Iordache	(Canada) Ellie Black	(Venezuela) Jessica López

== See also ==
- 2014 FIG Rhythmic Gymnastics World Cup series
