= 2014 Student Spartakiada =

The 2014 Student Spartakiada were held at the Penza Sports Palace in Penza, Russia from July 1 to 4. The competition featured junior gymnasts in the Master of Sport division.

== Medal winners ==
Event	Gold	Silver	Bronze
Women
Team all-around	Moscow; Viktoria Kuzmina; Alexandra Yazydzhyan; Seda Tutkhalyan; Daria Mikhailova	Saint Petersburg; Polina Petukhova; Lilia Akhaimova; Alexandra Sadkova; Anastasia Cheong	Bashkortostan Republic; Elena Bobyleva; Lina Akhmetshina; Olga Balekzhanina; Elina Kaigulova
Individual all-around	Seda Tutkhalyan	Daria Mikhailova	Viktoria Kuzmina
Vault	Seda Tutkhalyan	Daria Mikhailova	Anastasia Ocetova
Uneven Bars	Viktoria Kuzmina	Alexandra Yazydzhyan	Seda Tutkhalyan
Balance Beam	Ekaterina Tyunina	Daria Mikhailova	Viktoria Kuzmina
Floor Exercise	Lilia Akhaimova	Alexandra Pudovkina	Ekaterina Shchtronda

=== Individual all-around ===
Position	Gymnast	Vault (gymnastics)	Uneven bars	Balance beam	Floor (gymnastics)	Total
1st place, gold medalist(s)	Seda Tutkhalyan	14.900	13.466	13.500	13.366	56.232
2nd place, silver medalist(s)	Daria Mikhailova	13.833	12.633	14.100	14.333	54.899
3rd place, bronze medalist(s)	Viktoria Kuzmina	13.166	13.833	13.733	13.700	54.432

=== Vault ===
Rank	Gymnast	Score
1st place, gold medalist(s)	Seda Tutkhalyan	14.283
2nd place, silver medalist(s)	Daria Mikhailova	13.850
3rd place, bronze medalist(s)	Anastasia Ocetova	13.766

=== Uneven Bars ===
Rank	Gymnast	Score
1st place, gold medalist(s)	Viktoria Kuzmina	14.400
2nd place, silver medalist(s)	Alexandra Yazydzhyan	14.200
3rd place, bronze medalist(s)	Seda Tutkhalyan	14.000

=== Balance Beam ===
Rank	Gymnast	Score
1st place, gold medalist(s)	Ekaterina Tyunina	13.533
2nd place, silver medalist(s)	Daria Mikhailova	13.300
3rd place, bronze medalist(s)	Viktoria Kuzmina	13.266

=== Floor Exercise ===
Rank	Gymnast	Score
1st place, gold medalist(s)	Lilia Akhaimova	13.366
2nd place, silver medalist(s)	Alexandra Pudovkina	12.766
3rd place, bronze medalist(s)	Ekaterina Shchtronda	12.733
