= Saša Golob =

Slovenian artistic gymnast (born 1991)

- Born: 17 August 1991 (age 35) Ljubljana, Slovenia
- Height: 1.60 m (5 ft 3 in)

Gymnastics career
- Discipline: Women's artistic gymnastics
- Country represented: Slovenia
- Club: Gim Klub Siska
- Head coach: Liudmyla Korolenko
Medal record
Women's artistic gymnastics
Representing Slovenia
FIG World Cup
Event	1st	2nd	3rd
World Challenge Cup	1	2	1

Saša Golob (born 17 August 1991) is a Slovenian former artistic gymnast. She represented Slovenia at the 2012 Summer Olympics. She won four medals in the FIG World Cup series.

== Early life ==
Saša Golob was born on 17 August 1991 in Ljubljana to Vlado and Bernarda Golob. She has one older sister. She grew up in Domžale and began gymnastics when she was six years old.

== Gymnastics career ==
Golob made her World Championships debut in 2007 and only competed on the uneven bars. She competed on the balance beam and the floor exercise at the 2009 World Championships and did not advance to either final.

Golob received a scholarship for Towson University's gymnastics team and enrolled for the 2011 season, but she returned to Slovenia after one year to train for the Olympic Games. She competed at the 2011 World Championships and finished 86th in the all-around during the qualification round. She competed at the 2012 Olympic Test Event and finished 51st in the all-around, earning Slovenia an Olympic berth. The Slovenian Gymnastics Federation selected Golob because she placed higher than teammate Adela Šajn.

Golob tied with Lisa Top for a silver medal on the floor exercise at the 2012 Ghent World Challenge Cup. She then represented Slovenia at the 2012 Summer Olympics and did not advance beyond the qualification round.

Golob represented Slovenia at the 2013 Mediterranean Games and finished fourth in the floor exercise final. She also finished fourth on the floor exercise at the 2014 Cottbus World Cup. She then tied with Argentina's Ayelén Tarabini for the floor exercise title at the Ljubljana World Challenge Cup. She then won a silver medal on the floor exercise at the Medellin World Challenge Cup.

At the 2015 Anadia World Challenge Cup, Golob won a bronze medal on the floor exercise. She had knee surgery at the end of 2015 and stopped competing to concentrate on her studies.
