= Giulia Steingruber =

Swiss artistic gymnast

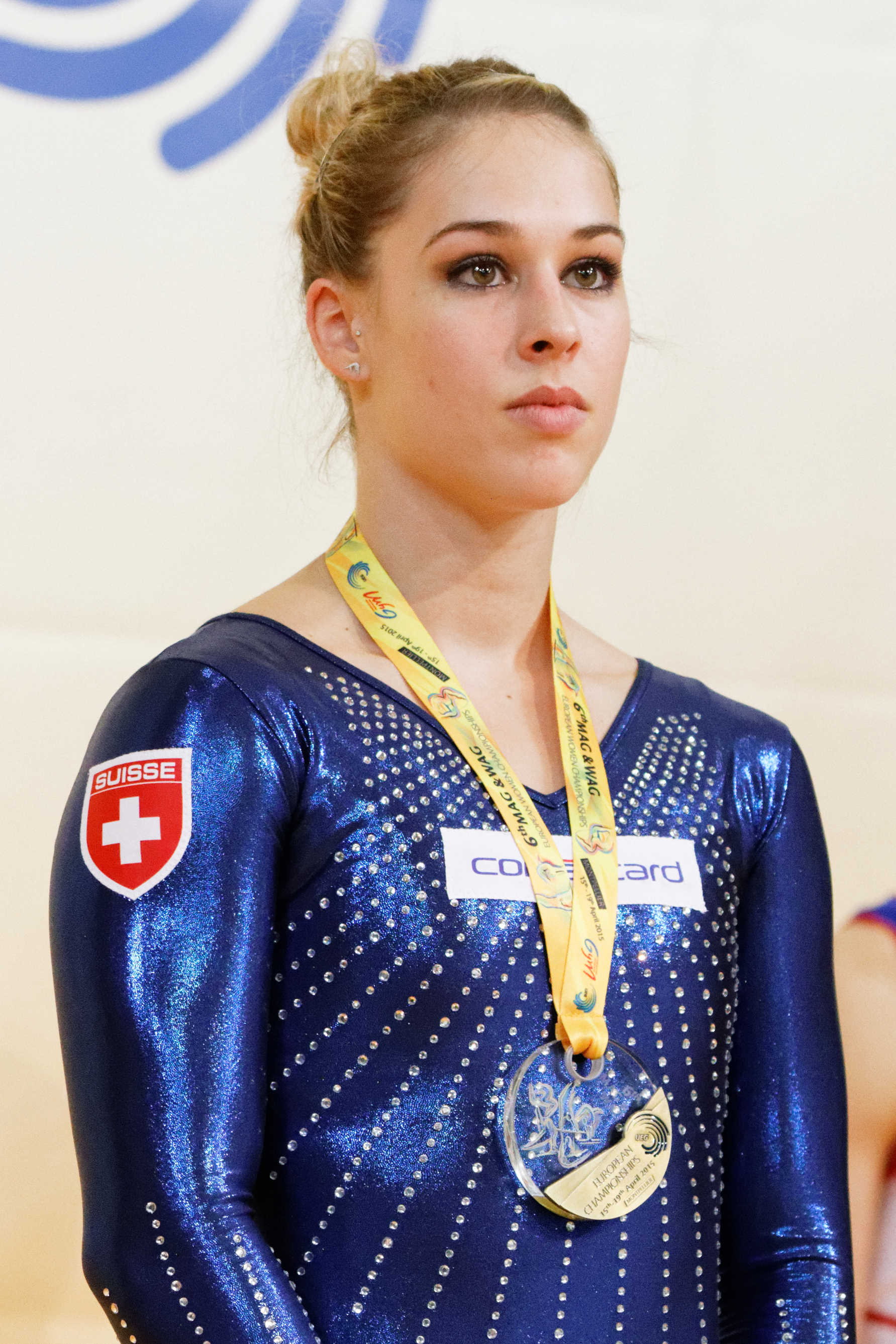
- Steingruber at the 2015 European Championships

Personal information
- Nickname: Giuly
- Born: 24 March 1994 (age 32) St. Gallen, Switzerland
- Height: 1.60 m (5 ft 3 in)

Gymnastics career
- Discipline: Women's artistic gymnastics
- Country represented: Switzerland; (2010–2021)
- Club: TZ Fürstenland / TV Gossau, Magglingen
- Head coach: Zoltan Jordanov
- Assistant coaches: Fabien Martin, Sznezsana Jordanov
- Eponymous skills: Steingruber (D): gainer salto backward stretched with 1/1 turn (360°) at the end of beam (Balance beam)
- Retired: 1 October 2021
- Awards: Longines Prize for Elegance (2015)
Medal record
Representing Switzerland
Olympic Games
Bronze medal – third place	2016 Rio de Janeiro	Vault
World Championships
Bronze medal – third place	2017 Montreal	Vault
European Games
Gold medal – first place	2015 Baku	Vault
Gold medal – first place	2015 Baku	Floor exercise
Silver medal – second place	2015 Baku	All-around
Bronze medal – third place	2015 Baku	Balance beam
European Championships
Gold medal – first place	2013 Moscow	Vault
Gold medal – first place	2014 Sofia	Vault
Gold medal – first place	2015 Montpellier	All-around
Gold medal – first place	2016 Bern	Vault
Gold medal – first place	2016 Bern	Floor exercise
Gold medal – first place	2021 Basel	Vault
Silver medal – second place	2015 Montpellier	Vault
Bronze medal – third place	2012 Brussels	Vault
Bronze medal – third place	2014 Sofia	Floor exercise
Bronze medal – third place	2015 Montpellier	Floor exercise
FIG World Cup
Event	1st	2nd	3rd
All-Around World Cup	0	0	3
Apparatus World Cup	5	2	1
World Challenge Cup	5	2	2
Total	10	4	6

Giulia Steingruber (born 24 March 1994) is a Swiss retired artistic gymnast. She is the 2016 Olympic and 2017 World bronze medalist on vault. Additionally, she is the 2015 European all-around champion, a four-time European vault champion (2013, 2014, 2016, and 2021) and the 2016 European floor exercise champion.

Steingruber competed for Switzerland at the 2012, 2016 and 2020 Olympic Games. She is the first Swiss female gymnast to win the European all-around title and the first Swiss female gymnast ever to win an Olympic gymnastics medal of any color.

== Career ==
Steingruber began gymnastics when she was seven years old.

=== 2011 ===
Steingruber competed at the European Championships in Berlin and finished ninth in the all-around and sixth on vault. She then competed in a friendly meet against Romania and Germany where the Swiss team finished third. She was selected to compete at the World Championships, and the Swiss team finished eighteenth. Individually, she finished sixteenth in the all-around and fifth in the vault final.

=== 2012 ===
Steingruber finished seventh in the all-around at the Olympic Test Event and qualified a spot for the 2012 Olympic Games. She won the bronze medal on vault at the 2012 European Championships behind Sandra Izbașa and Oksana Chusovitina. Then at the Doha World Challenge Cup, she won the gold medal on vault. Then at the Osijek World Challenge Cup, she won the silver medal on vault behind Ellie Black, and she won gold on the balance beam and tied for gold on the floor exercise with Black. She won the silver medal on vault at the Ghent World Challenge Cup behind Alexa Moreno.

Steingruber represented Switzerland at the 2012 Summer Olympics. She qualified for the all-around final where she finished fourteenth with a score of 56.148. She was also a reserve for the vault final. After the Olympics, she competed at the Swiss Cup alongside Claudio Capelli, and they won the silver medal behind the German team. In December, she competed at the Stuttgart World Cup and won bronze in the all-around behind Elizabeth Price and Elisabeth Seitz with a total score of 55.565.

=== 2013 ===
Steingruber competed at the La Roche-sur-Yon World Cup in France and placed first on the vault and uneven bars with scores of 13.433 and 13.600, respectively. Later that month, she competed at the City of Jesolo Trophy in March and placed eighth in the all-around, with a total score of 55.550. She went on to win bronze in the vault final at the Doha World Challenge Cup, scoring a 15.225 on her first vault and a 14.100 on her second, for an average of 14.662.

At the European Championships in Moscow, Steingruber qualified first for the vault final and went on to take gold with an average of 14.750. She also qualified for the individual all-around and floor finals. In the all-around final, she tied for fourth with Romanian gymnast Diana Bulimar with a score of 57.065, while on the floor she finished sixth with a score of 14.100. Then at the World Championships, she finished seventh in the all-around, fourth on vault, and fifth on floor exercise.

After the World Championships, Steingruber won the silver medal in the all-around at the Arthur Gander Memorial behind Larisa Iordache. Then at the Swiss Cup, she competed with Claudio Capelli, and they won the bronze medal behind Romania and Germany. She then finished fourth in the all-around at the Stuttgart World Cup.

=== 2014 ===
Steingruber won the all-around bronze medal behind Americans Elizabeth Price and Brenna Dowell at the American Cup. Then at the Osijek World Challenge Cup, she won the gold medal on the floor exercise, the silver medal on the vault, and the bronze medal on the balance beam. At the European Championships, she won a gold medal on vault with a score of 14.666. She also won the bronze medal on the floor exercise behind Vanessa Ferrari and Larisa Iordache.

Steingruber won the all-around title at the Swiss Championships, and she won gold in every event final except for balance beam where she won silver behind Ilaria Käslin. In September, she competed at the Switzerland-Germany-Romania Tri-Friendly meet in Obersiggenthal, Switzerland where the Swiss team finished third, and Steingruber finished second in the all-around behind Larisa Iordache. At the World Championships, Steingruber qualified for the all-around final and placed fifteenth with a total score of 55.132. She also tied for fifth place in the vault final with Great Britain's Claudia Fragapane, with an average score of 14.716. After the World Championships, she finished fourth in the all-around at the Arthur Gander Memorial. Then at the Swiss Cup, she finished fourth with teammate Claudio Capelli after injuring her foot on her vault.

=== 2015 ===
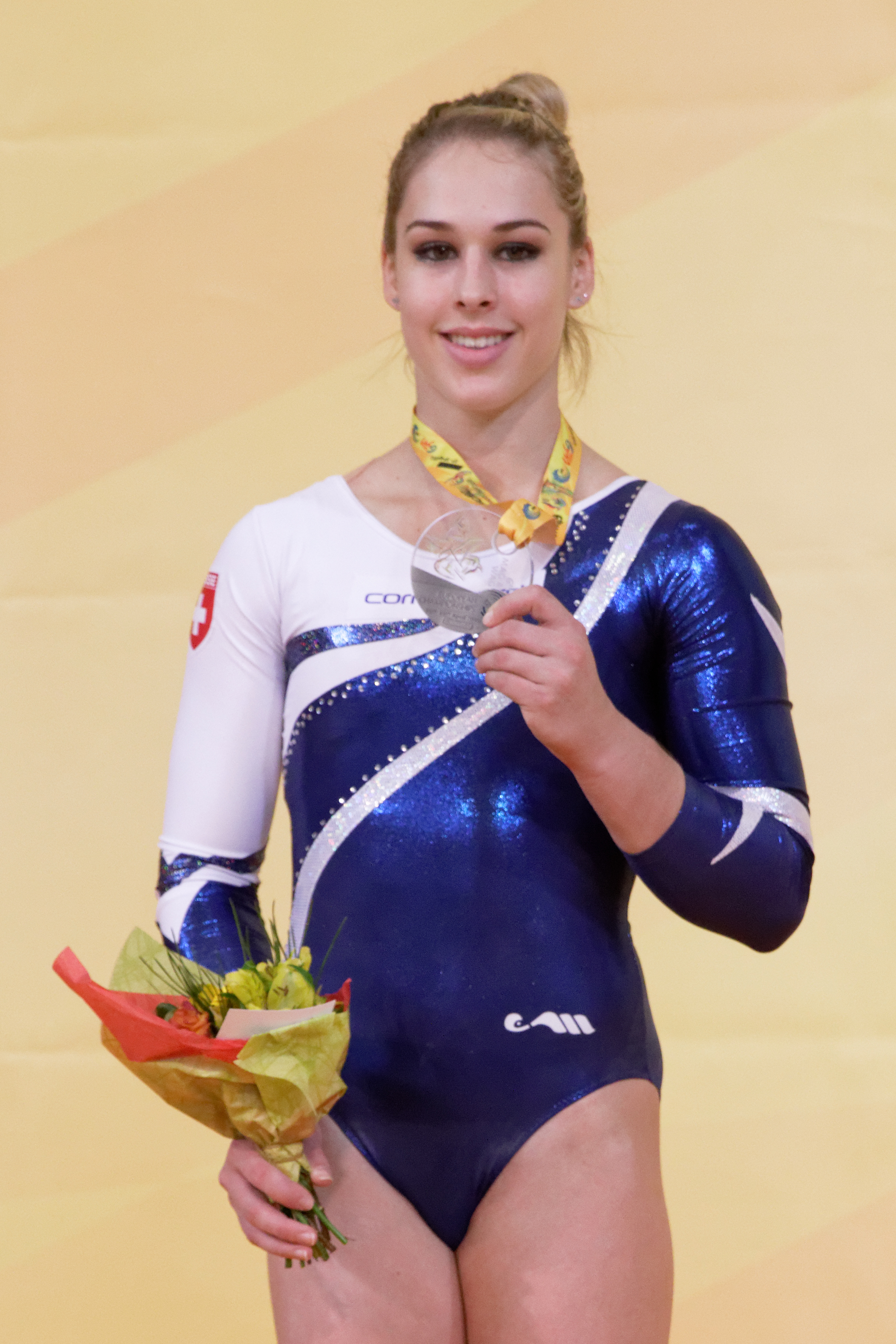
Steingruber at the 2015 European Championships

Steingruber was able to return to competition in February at the Austrian Team Open where she won the gold medal in the all-around, and Switzerland won the team silver medal behind China. Then at the Doha World Cup, she won the gold medals on vault and floor and the silver medal on balance beam. At the European Championships, she won the all-around title ahead of Maria Kharenkova of Russia and Ellie Downie of Great Britain, with a score of 57.873, becoming the first Swiss gymnast ever to win the European all-around title. However, she failed to defend her vault title, and was beaten by the 2012 Olympic vault bronze medalist Maria Paseka. She also qualified for the uneven bars final and placed sixth with a score of 13.766. She won the bronze medal on the floor with a score of 14.466 behind Claudia Fragapane of Great Britain and Ksenia Afanasyeva of Russia.

Steingruber won bronze medals on both the vault and the uneven bars at the Varna World Cup. In June, she competed at the 2015 European Games held in Baku, along with teammates Jessica Diacci and Caterina Barloggio, and they finished sixth in the team competition. She won the silver medal in the all-around behind Aliya Mustafina, with a score of 56.699. In addition, she won the gold medal on the vault, with a total score of 14.999, and on the floor, with a score of 14.266. She was also the bronze medalist on the balance beam, with a 13.700. Then at the Swiss Championships, she swept the gold medals except for balance beam where she won the bronze. She helped the Swiss team finish third behind Brazil and Germany at the Länderkampf Kunstturnen. At the World Championships in Glasgow, she finished second in the all-around behind Simone Biles during the qualification round. In the final, she finished fifth after falling off the balance beam. She was awarded the Longines Prize for Elegance after the all-around final. She injured her knee during the vault final and had to withdraw from the floor final.

=== 2016 ===
Steingruber returned to competition at the Austrian Team Open, helping her team win the gold medal and winning silver in the all-around behind Hungarian Zsófia Kovács. Then at the DTB Team Challenge, she helped the Swiss team win bronze behind Russia and Germany. She won gold medals on both vault and floor exercise at the Doha World Challenge Cup. She competed with the Swiss team at the Olympic Test Event. Although the Swiss team did not qualify, Steingruber won the all-around gold medal and qualified an individual spot for the 2016 Olympic Games.

Steingruber won the gold medals on vault and floor exercise and the bronze medal on the uneven bars at the Varna World Challenge Cup. At the European Championships, she helped the Swiss team qualify for the team final in third place, behind only Great Britain and Russia. She also qualified first for the vault final with an average score of 15.433, eighth for the uneven bars final with a score of 14.033, and second for the floor final with a score of 14.966. In the team final, she contributed an all-around score of 57.657 to lead the Swiss team to a fourth-place finish. In event finals, Steingruber won her third European vault title with an average score of 14.983, just 0.050 ahead of Ellie Downie. She then placed sixth in the uneven bars final with a score of 14.166, and won the floor final for her first European title on the event with a score of 15.200, finishing 0.634 ahead of Downie, the silver medalist. She then swept the gold medals at the Swiss Championships. Then at the Chemnitz Friendly, she helped the Swiss team finish fourth, and she won the gold medal in the all-around.

At the Olympic Games in Rio de Janeiro, Steingruber was chosen to be the flag bearer for Switzerland at the opening ceremony. During the qualification round, she qualified in fourteenth place for the all-around final with a score of 56.899. She also qualified third for the vault final with an average of 15.266, and fourth for the floor final with a score of 14.666. In the all-around final, Steingruber finished in tenth place with a score of 57.565, the highest finish by a Swiss gymnast in non-boycotted Olympic games. In the vault final, she won the bronze medal with an average of 15.216, 0.037 behind the silver medalist Maria Paseka of Russia. Steingruber's bronze is the first-ever Olympic medal of any color for Switzerland in women's gymnastics. Steingruber went on to finish eighth in the floor exercise with a score of 11.800 after falling on her double-double mount and springing out of bounds and later falling on her tucked full-in dismount. She injured her foot during this routine, and she had surgery in January 2017.

=== 2017 ===
Steingruber returned to competition at the Swiss Championships and won the all-around gold medal by nearly three points. She won gold in the vault final and silver in the uneven bars final. She then competed at the World Championships in Montreal. She finished in seventh place in the all-around final with a total score of 53.666. During the event finals, she won her first World medal with the bronze on vault by finishing behind Maria Paseka and Jade Carey. At the Swiss Cup, she won the gold medal with teammate Pablo Brägger.

In 2017, she was made an honorary citizen of her hometown of Gossau, St. Gallen.

=== 2018 ===
Steingruber began the season at the DTB Pokal Team Challenge, and the Swiss team won the silver medal behind Belgium, and she won bronze in the all-around behind Nina Derwael and Hitomi Hatakeda. Then at the Koper World Cup in Slovenia, she won gold medals on vault and floor, and a silver medal on the balance beam behind Céline van Gerner. At the Sainté Gym Cup in early July, she injured herself during her floor routine and fractured her Tibia, as well as tearing her ACL and meniscus, and she missed the rest of the season.

=== 2019 ===
Steingruber made her comeback at the Swiss Championships in September, over a year after sustaining her injury, where she won the all-around with a score of 53.100. Afterwards, she was named to the team to compete at the World Championships in Stuttgart, Germany, alongside Ilaria Käslin, Stenfanie Siegenthaler, Anny Wu, and Caterina Barloggio. The following week, she competed at the Second Heerenveen Friendly where she helped the Switzerland finish in third behind the Netherlands and Spain. Individually, she placed second in the all-around behind Naomi Visser of the Netherlands. At the World Championships Steingruber qualified for the all-around final and as a result qualified as an individual to the 2020 Olympic Games in Tokyo. She was also the first reserve for the vault final and the third reserve for the floor exercise final. During the all-around final, she finished in eighteenth place with a total score of 53.866.

=== 2020–21 ===
As a result of the COVID-19 pandemic, Steingruber did not participate in any competitions during 2020 as most competitions were canceled or postponed. She competed at the 2021 European Championships held in Basel. Although she qualified for the all-around final, she withdrew in order to focus on the event finals. She won gold on vault ahead of Jessica Gadirova and Angelina Melnikova. She then withdrew from the floor final due to a left thigh injury. Then at the Swiss Championships, she won the gold medal in the all-around. Steingruber represented Switzerland at the 2020 Summer Olympics. She was the first reserve for the vault final, and she qualified for the all-around final where she finished fifteenth.

On 1 October 2021, Steingruber announced her retirement from gymnastics. She began coaching at the Swiss national team training center in Magglingen.

== Eponymous skill ==
Steingruber has one eponymous skill listed in the Code of Points.

Apparatus	Name	Description	Difficulty (Note: Valid for the 2025–2028 Code of Points)	Added to the Code of Points
Balance beam	Steingruber	Gainer salto backward stretched with 1/1 turn (360°) at the end of beam	D (0.4)	2011 World Championships

== Competitive history ==
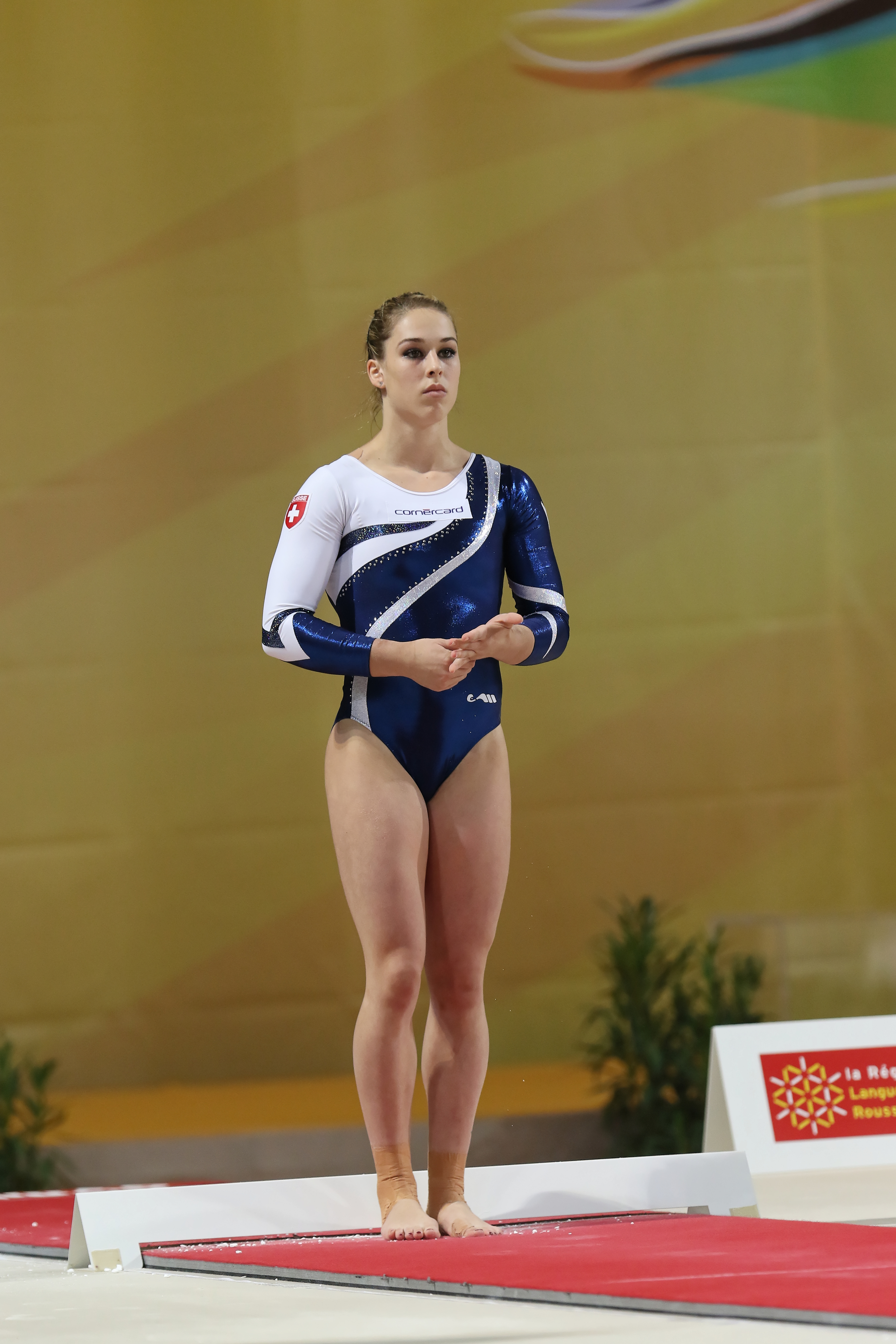
Steingruber about to vault at the 2015 European Championships

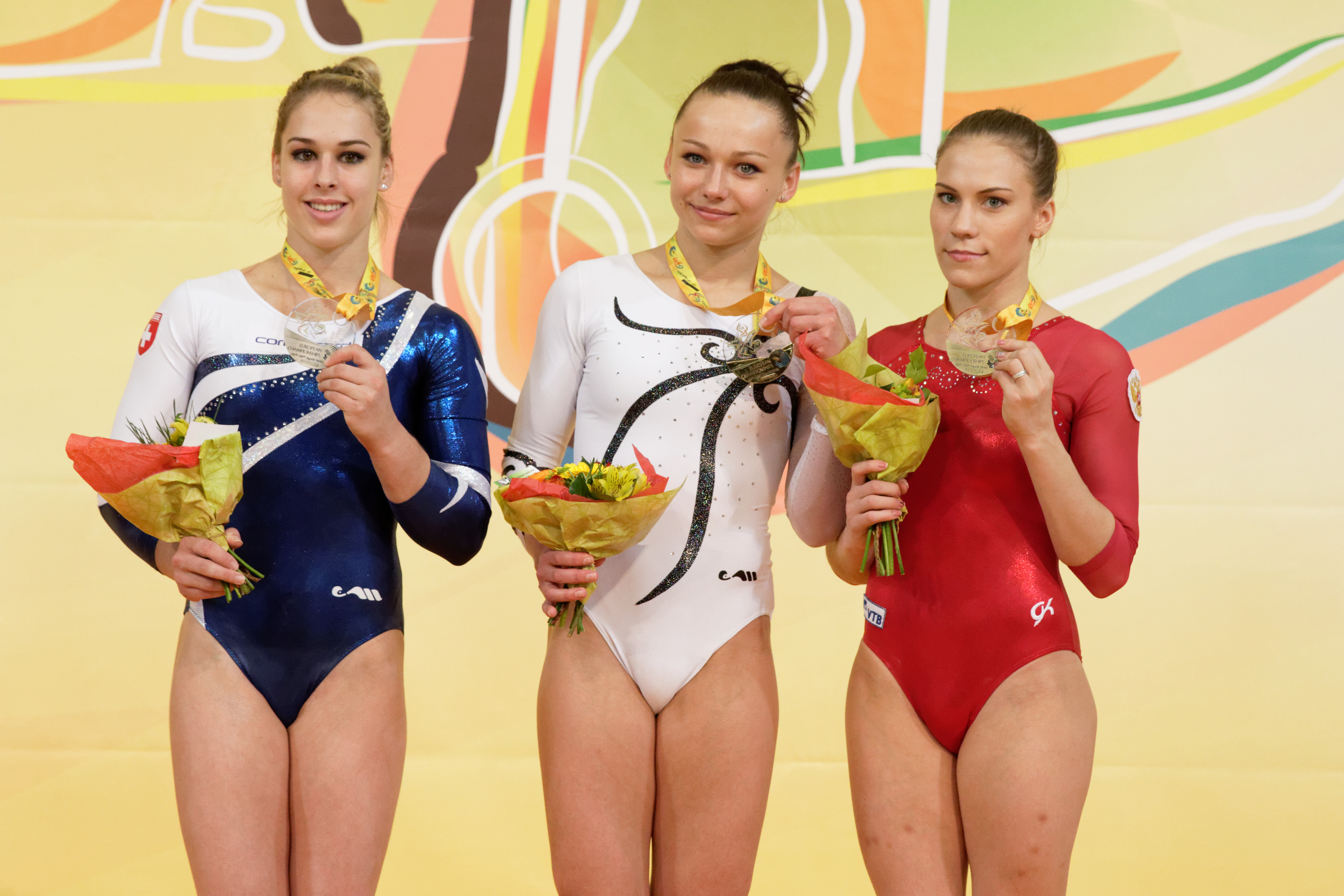
Steingruber (left) with Maria Paseka (centre) and Ksenia Afanasyeva (right) on the vault podium at the 2015 European Championships

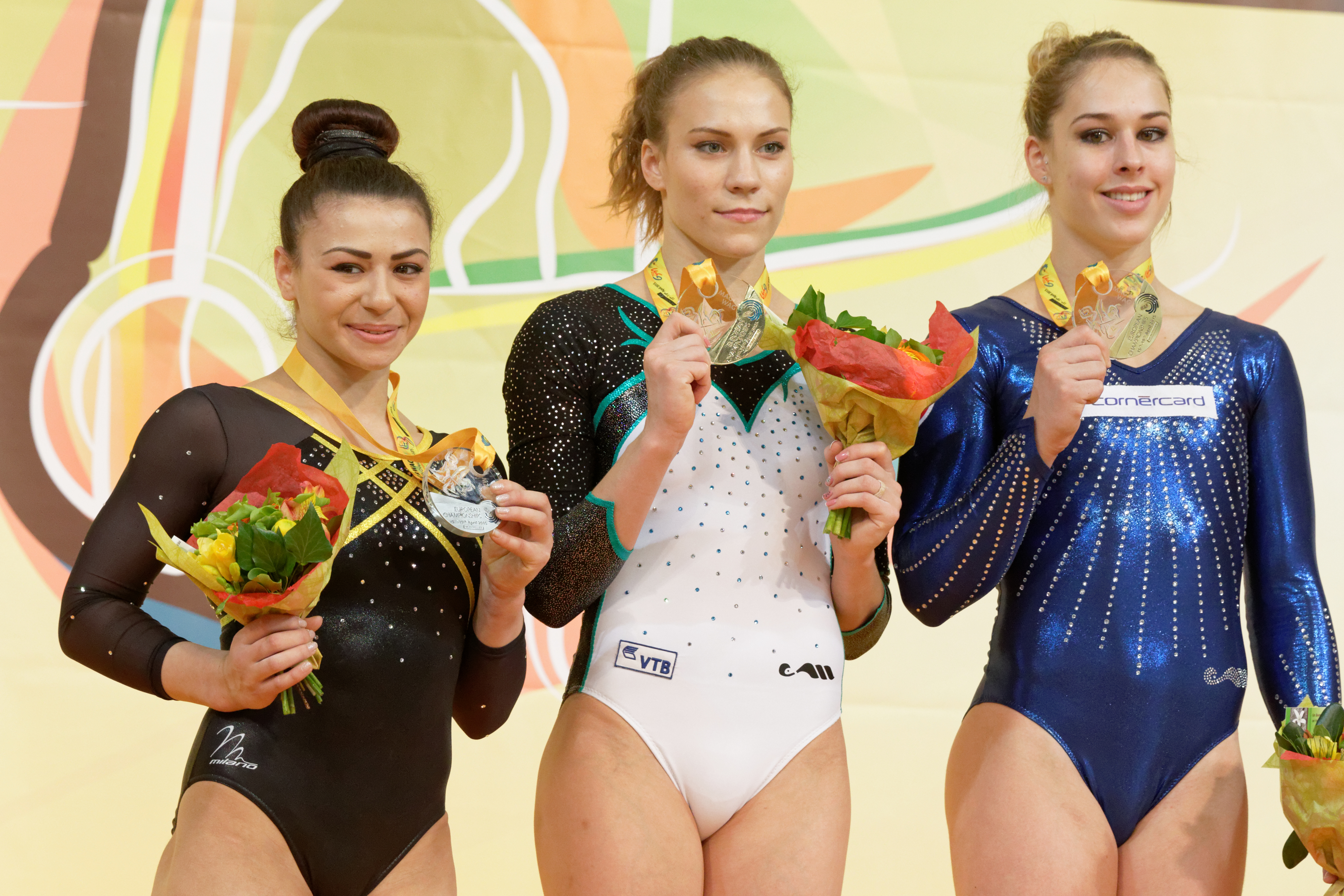
Steingruber (right) with Claudia Fragapane (left) and Ksenia Afanasyeva (centre) on the floor exercise podium at the 2015 European Championships

Competitive history of Giulia Steingruber
Year	Event	Team	AA	VT	UB	BB	FX
2011
2011	European Championships		9	6			
2011	SUI-GER-ROU Friendly	3rd place, bronze medalist(s)	8				
2011	World Championships		16	5			
2012	Olympic Test Event		7	5			
2012	European Championships			3rd place, bronze medalist(s)			
2012	Doha World Challenge Cup			1st place, gold medalist(s)	8	6	
2012	Osijek World Challenge Cup			2nd place, silver medalist(s)		1st place, gold medalist(s)	1st place, gold medalist(s)
2012	Ghent World Challenge Cup			2nd place, silver medalist(s)		6	
2012	Olympic Games		14	R1			
2012	Swiss Cup	2nd place, silver medalist(s)					
2012	Stuttgart World Cup		3rd place, bronze medalist(s)				
2013	La Roche sur Yon World Cup			1st place, gold medalist(s)	1st place, gold medalist(s)		
2013	City of Jesolo Trophy	5	8				
2013	Doha World Challenge Cup			3rd place, bronze medalist(s)	4		
2013	European Championships		4	1st place, gold medalist(s)			6
2013	World Championships		7	4			5
2013	Arthur Gander Memorial		2nd place, silver medalist(s)				
2013	Swiss Cup	3rd place, bronze medalist(s)					
2013	Stuttgart World Cup		4				
2014	American Cup		3rd place, bronze medalist(s)				
2014	Osijek World Cup			2nd place, silver medalist(s)	5	3rd place, bronze medalist(s)	1st place, gold medalist(s)
2014	European Championships	8		1st place, gold medalist(s)		8	3rd place, bronze medalist(s)
2014	Swiss Championships		1st place, gold medalist(s)	1st place, gold medalist(s)	1st place, gold medalist(s)	2nd place, silver medalist(s)	1st place, gold medalist(s)
2014	SUI-GER-ROU Friendly	3rd place, bronze medalist(s)	2nd place, silver medalist(s)	3rd place, bronze medalist(s)	6	3rd place, bronze medalist(s)	3rd place, bronze medalist(s)
2014	World Championships		15	5			
2014	Arthur Gander Memorial		4				
2014	Swiss Cup	4					
2015	Austrian Team Open	2nd place, silver medalist(s)	1st place, gold medalist(s)				
2015	Doha World Cup			1st place, gold medalist(s)		2nd place, silver medalist(s)	1st place, gold medalist(s)
2015	European Championships		1st place, gold medalist(s)	2nd place, silver medalist(s)	6		3rd place, bronze medalist(s)
2015	Varna World Cup			3rd place, bronze medalist(s)	3rd place, bronze medalist(s)		
2015	European Games	6	2nd place, silver medalist(s)	1st place, gold medalist(s)		3rd place, bronze medalist(s)	1st place, gold medalist(s)
2015	Swiss Championships		1st place, gold medalist(s)	1st place, gold medalist(s)	1st place, gold medalist(s)	3rd place, bronze medalist(s)	1st place, gold medalist(s)
2015	Länderkampf Kunstturnen	3rd place, bronze medalist(s)	7				
2015	World Championships		5	7			WD
2016	Austrian Team Open	1st place, gold medalist(s)	2nd place, silver medalist(s)				
2016	DTB Team Challenge	3rd place, bronze medalist(s)					
2016	Doha World Challenge Cup			1st place, gold medalist(s)		7	1st place, gold medalist(s)
2016	Olympic Test Event	6	1st place, gold medalist(s)				
2016	Varna World Challenge Cup			1st place, gold medalist(s)	3rd place, bronze medalist(s)		1st place, gold medalist(s)
2016	European Championships	4		1st place, gold medalist(s)		6	1st place, gold medalist(s)
2016	Swiss Championships		1st place, gold medalist(s)	1st place, gold medalist(s)	1st place, gold medalist(s)	1st place, gold medalist(s)	1st place, gold medalist(s)
2016	Chemnitz Friendly	4	1st place, gold medalist(s)				
2016	Olympic Games		10	3rd place, bronze medalist(s)			8
2017	Swiss Championships		1st place, gold medalist(s)	1st place, gold medalist(s)	2nd place, silver medalist(s)		
2017	World Championships		7	3rd place, bronze medalist(s)			
2017	Swiss Cup	1st place, gold medalist(s)					
2018	DTB Pokal Team Challenge	2nd place, silver medalist(s)	3rd place, bronze medalist(s)	3rd place, bronze medalist(s)		3rd place, bronze medalist(s)	2nd place, silver medalist(s)
2018	Koper World Challenge Cup			1st place, gold medalist(s)	5	2nd place, silver medalist(s)	1st place, gold medalist(s)
2018	Sainté Gym Cup	3rd place, bronze medalist(s)					
2019	Swiss Championships		1st place, gold medalist(s)				
2019	Second Heerenveen Friendly	3rd place, bronze medalist(s)	2nd place, silver medalist(s)				
2019	World Championships		18				
2019	Arthur Gander Memorial		4				
2019	Swiss Cup	3rd place, bronze medalist(s)					
2021
2021	European Championships		WD	1st place, gold medalist(s)			WD
2021	Swiss Championships		1st place, gold medalist(s)				
2021	Olympic Games		15	R1			

Awards and achievements
Preceded by Nicola Spirig	Swiss Sportswoman of the Year; 2013	Succeeded by Dominique Gisin
Olympic Games
Preceded by Stanislas Wawrinka	Flagbearer for Switzerland; Rio de Janeiro 2016	Succeeded by Mujinga Kambundji & Max Heinzer
