= Mary-Anne Monckton =

Australian artistic gymnast

- Nickname: Mez
- Born: 16 November 1994 (age 31) Belmont, Newcastle, New South Wales, Australia
- Height: 150 cm (4 ft 11 in)

Gymnastics career
- Discipline: Women's artistic gymnastics
- Country represented: Australia; (2006 – present)
- Club: AIS, Victorian Women's High Performance Centre
- Head coaches: Misha Barabach & Tracey Penaluna
- Former coach: Michelle Rostas (Newcastle Australia)
- Choreographer: Lisa Bradley
- Music: The Child of Nazareth, Martine Rodriguez
- Eponymous skills: The Monckton
- Retired: 2017
- World ranking: Top 10 on Beam in 2014 and 2015
Medal record
Representing Australia
Commonwealth Games
Silver medal – second place	2014 Glasgow	Team
Silver medal – second place	2014 Glasgow	Balance Beam
World Cup
Silver medal – second place	2014 Doha	Balance Beam
Australian Youth Olympic Festival
Silver medal – second place	2007 Sydney	Floor Exercise
Australian National Championships
Gold medal – first place	2011 Perth	Team
Gold medal – first place	2012 Sydney	Team
Gold medal – first place	2013 Sydney	Team
Gold medal – first place	2014 Melbourne	Team
Gold medal – first place	2014 Melbourne	Balance Beam
Silver medal – second place	2010 Perth	All-Around
Silver medal – second place	2010 Perth	Uneven Bars
Silver medal – second place	2011 Perth	Uneven Bars
Silver medal – second place	2011 Perth	Floor Exercise
Silver medal – second place	2012 Sydney	Uneven Bars
Silver medal – second place	2013 Sydney	Balance Beam
Bronze medal – third place	2011 Perth	All-Around
Bronze medal – third place	2011 Perth	Balance Beam
Bronze medal – third place	2012 Sydney	All-Around

Mary-Anne Monckton (born 16 November 1994) is an Australian artistic gymnast. She won two silver medals at the 2014 Commonwealth Games and has represented Australia at three world championships (2011, 2014, 2015). In 2020, she was the first of several former gymnasts to speak out about a "toxic" culture within the country's elite programme.

== Senior career ==
=== 2014 ===
At the 2014 Commonwealth Games, Monckton helped the Australian team finish in second place, scoring 14.000 on vault, 13.333 on the uneven bars and 13.100 on the balance beam. Monckton also qualified for the balance beam final, where she scored 13.666 and earned a second silver medal.

== Eponymous skill ==
Monckton has one eponymous skill listed in the Code of Points.

Apparatus	Name	Description	Difficulty (Note: Valid for the 2025-2028 Code of Points)	Added to Code of Points
Uneven bars	Monckton	Long Swing forward with ½ turn (180°), pike vault over high bar to hang	D	2011 World Championships
