= Switzerland women's national artistic gymnastics team =

National sports team

Switzerland
- Continental union: European Union of Gymnastics
- National federation: Swiss Gymnastics Federation

Olympic Games
- Appearances: 2

The Switzerland women's national artistic gymnastics team represents Switzerland in FIG international competitions.

== History ==
Switzerland has participated in the Olympic Games women's team competition two times, in 1972 and 1984.

== Senior roster ==
Name	Birth date and age	Birthplace
Thea Brogli	January 31, 2000 (age 26)	Wittnau
Lilli Habisreutinger	June 11, 2004 (age 22)	Wuppenau
Nicole Hitz	April 25, 1997 (age 29)	Hütten
Stefanie Siegenthaler	April 20, 1998 (age 28)	Wiesendangen
Anina Wildi	October 31, 2002 (age 24)	Schafisheim

== Most decorated gymnasts ==
This list includes all Swiss female artistic gymnasts who have won a medal at the Olympic Games or the World Artistic Gymnastics Championships.

Rank	Gymnast	Team	AA	VT	UB	BB	FX	Olympic Total	World Total	Total
1	Giulia Steingruber			2016; 2017				1	1	2
2	Ariella Käslin			2009				0	1	1

== See also ==
- List of Olympic female artistic gymnasts for Switzerland
- Switzerland men's national artistic gymnastics team
