= Ilaria Käslin =

Swiss artistic gymnast

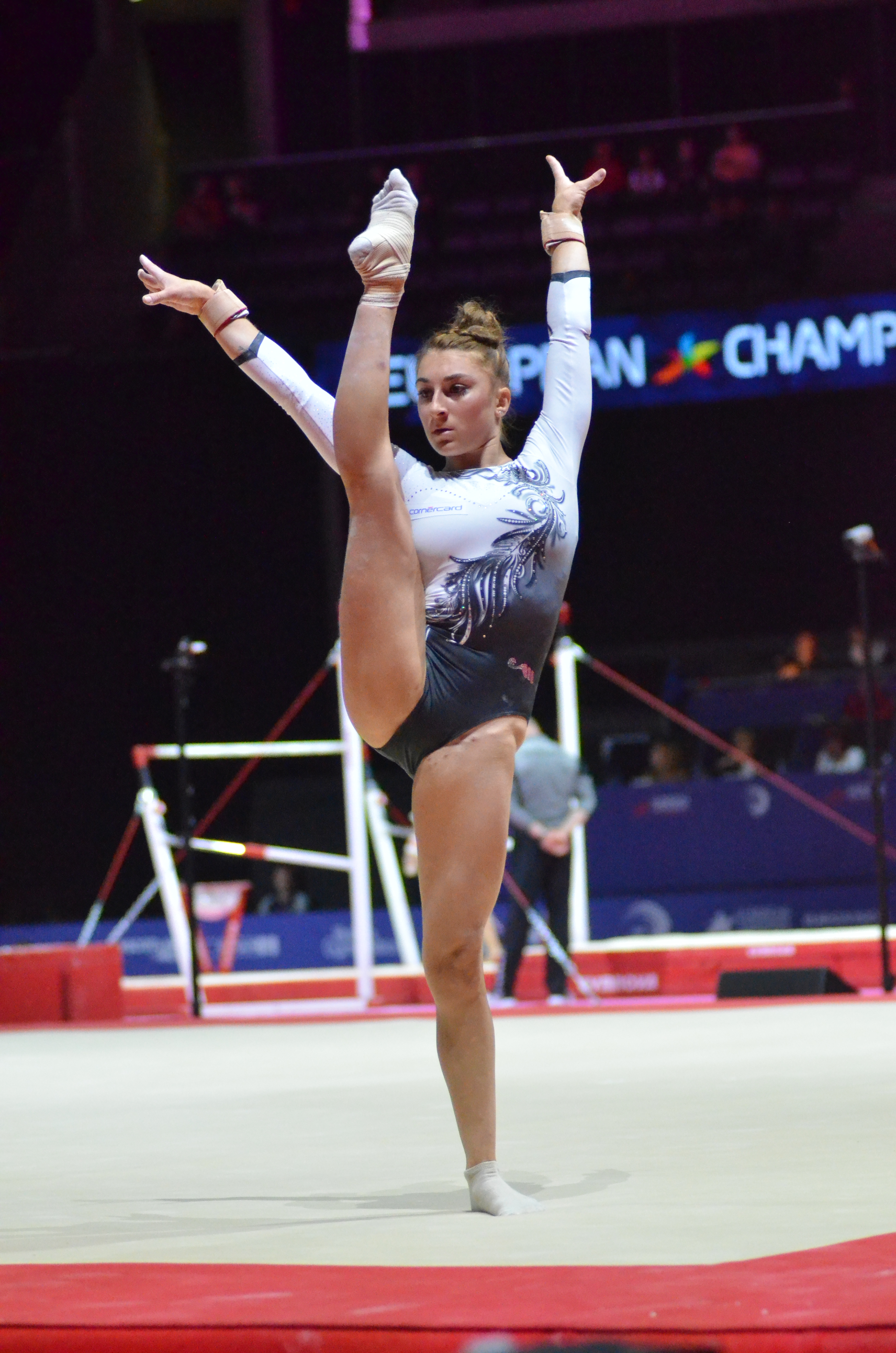
- Käslin in 2018

Personal information
- Full name: Ilaria Marina Käslin
- Born: 8 December 1997 (age 28) Sagno, Switzerland

Gymnastics career
- Discipline: Women's artistic gymnastics
- Country represented: Switzerland; (2012–20)
- Club: SFG Chiasso
- Head coach: Zoltan Jordanov
- Former coach: Monia Marazzi
- Music: Nuvole Blanche by Einaldi (2013)
- Retired: 14 May 2020

Ilaria Marina Käslin (or Kaeslin; born 8 December 1997) is a retired Swiss artistic gymnast. She competed at the World Artistic Gymnastics Championships from 2013 to 2015 and in 2019.

== Junior career ==
=== 2012 ===
Ilaria Käslin began her international career at the 2012 Junior European Championships. She competed in the team final with the Swiss team, contributing scores towards their 13th-place finish, and qualified individually 15th into the all-around final. On finals day, she posted 12.833 on vault, 11.266 on bars, 13.333 on beam and 12.966 on floor to finish eighteenth.

== Senior career ==
=== 2013 ===
Käslin made her senior debut at the 2013 European Championships in Moscow, Russia, qualifying 18th into the all-around with a 51.499 and improving her final score to 53.632 to finish thirteenth overall. In early fall, she was named to the Swiss team for the 2013 World Championships in Antwerp. In qualifications, Käslin competed in the third subdivision and qualified to the all-around in twenty-fourth place, where she finished twenty-second with an overall score of 51.566.

At the end of October, she competed at the Arthur Gander Memorial in Morges, Switzerland, where she performed on vault, bars and beam to finish ninth overall; then headed straight to Zurich for the Swiss Cup, where she teamed up with Olivier Hegi to finish eighth.

She was named to the Swiss team for the Stuttgart World Cup at the end of November, contributing scores on all four pieces towards their fourth-place finish.

=== 2014 ===
Käslin performed at the World Challenge Cup in Osijek, Croatia in April, finishing 8th on bars and 6th on beam after falling. In May she competed at the European Championships in Sofia, Bulgaria, contributing a 13.200 on bars, a 14.100 on beam (by far the team's best beam score) and a 13.100 on floor towards the Swiss team's eighth-place finish.

In August, she competed at the Swiss Championships, winning gold on beam, bronze on floor, and placing fourth all-around. In September, the Swiss team competed at a friendly meet against Germany and Romania, where Käslin contributed a 13.300 on bars and a 13.850 on beam. The Couch Gymnast commented, "She might be lacking a bit in difficulty but she makes up and then more with her toe point and fluidity." She competed as part of the Swiss team at the World Championships in Nanning, China, where she qualified in 84th place, missing the all-around final.

Käslin then competed at the Arthur Gander Memorial in Chiasso in October, finishing in 6th place, and at the Swiss Cup a few days later where she teamed up with Pascal Bucher but failed to make team finals. Two weeks later she travelled to Barcelona for the Joaquim Blume Memorial, where she placed sixth all-around with a total score of 52.200.

Later in November, Käslin competed at the Stuttgart World Cup where she helped her team to the bronze medal.

=== 2015 ===
In February, she competed at the Austrian Open, helping her team to the silver medal and placing fifth individually. At the World Challenge Cup in Doha in March, she placed seventh on bars and won the bronze medal in the floor final with a score of 13.750.

At the European Championships in April, her qualifying score put her in 31st place but she failed to advance to the all-around final as her teammates Giulia Steingruber and Jessica Diacci had qualified ahead of her. In May she performed at the World Challenge Cup in Varna, Bulgaria, where she won bronze on beam and gold on floor.

Käslin competed at the World Championships in Glasgow, where she posted an all-around score of 53.456 towards the Swiss team's 16th-place finish, ensuring them a spot at the Olympic test event in April 2016. Individually Ilaria finished 46th all-around in qualification.

Directly after the World Championships, Käslin headed to the Arthur Gander Memorial where she placed 5th, then went straight to compete at the Swiss Cup where she and Pablo Braegger teamed up to finish 4th.

=== 2016 ===
In 2016, it was Ilaria's best year of her career. For the first time, she qualified for the balance beam final at the European Championships in Bern. It was an emotionally rich European Championship for the Swiss team, which finished fourth in the team final. In 2016, Ilaria participated with the Swiss team in the Test events in Rio de Janeiro, the final qualifying stage for the Olympic Games. Despite the team's excellent performance, Switzerland narrowly missed out on qualification.

=== 2019–2020 ===
Käslin was named to the team to compete at the 2019 World Championships in Stuttgart, Germany alongside Giulia Steingruber, Stenfanie Siegenthaler, Anny Wu, and Caterina Barloggio.

On 14 May 2020 Käslin announced her retirement from gymnastics.

== Coaching career ==
Käslin is a coach for acrobatic gymnastics at the AcroGym Neuchâtel club, founded by Filka Pennisi Stoykova and Giuseppe Pennisi in 2015. She holds a Bachelor's degree in Psychology and is currently pursuing a Certificate of Advanced Studies (CAS) at the University of Lausanne in Mental Preparation for Athletes, Musicians, and Dancers. Additionally, she is an instructor of Pilatesflows.
