= 2014 World Artistic Gymnastics Championships – Women's qualification =

The women's qualification rounds at the 2014 World Artistic Gymnastics Championships took place on October 5–6, 2014, in the Guangxi Gymnasium in Nanning.

== Team qualification ==
Team	Vault (gymnastics)		Uneven bars		Balance beam		Floor (gymnastics)		Total (All-around)	
Team	Score	Rank	Score	Rank	Score	Rank	Score	Rank	Score	Rank
United States	61.599	1	58.083	3	57.490	2	57.866	1	235.038	1
Simone Biles (USA)	15.800	2	13.300	57	15.133	1	15.366	1	59.599	1
Kyla Ross (USA)	15.100	8	14.650	12	14.391	7	13.800	15	57.941	5
MyKayla Skinner (USA)	15.666	3	13.900	29	13.533	37	14.700	3	57.799	6
Madison Kocian (USA)	14.133	43	14.300	18	13.900	21	13.633	20	55.966	14
Alyssa Baumann (USA)	15.033	9			14.066	14	14.000	10		
Ashton Locklear (USA)			15.233	4						
China	58.265	5	60.890	1	58.633	1	52.965	9	230.753	2
Yao Jinnan (CHN)	14.833	14	15.666	1	14.900	3	12.633	95	58.032	4
Shang Chunsong (CHN)	13.966	67	14.558	14	14.633	5	13.966	11	57.123	8
Chen Siyi (CHN)	14.333	32	11.458	142	13.533	38	12.533	106	51.832	55
Tan Jiaxin (CHN)	15.133	5	15.333	3			13.600	24		
Bai Yawen (CHN)	13.666	120			14.800	4	12.766	79		
Huang Huidan (CHN)			15.333	2	14.300	9				
Russia	59.265	2	59.632	2	54.473	6	54.765	5	228.135	3
Aliya Mustafina (RUS)	14.900	11	15.166	5	14.308	8	14.500	5	58.874	2
Alla Sosnitskaya (RUS)	15.133	5	14.408	16	13.666	30	13.533	29	56.740	10
Ekaterina Kramarenko (RUS)	14.466	29	14.766	9	13.566	33	13.066	60	55.864	15
Maria Kharenkova (RUS)	13.900	76			12.933	74	13.666	19		
Daria Spiridonova (RUS)			15.100	7	12.166	126	12.833	73		
Tatiana Nabieva (RUS)	14.766	20	14.600	13						
United Kingdom	58.400	4	56.431	4	54.999	5	54.766	4	224.596	4
Ruby Harrold (GBR)	14.600	26	14.733	10	13.700	28	13.733	18	56.766	9
Claudia Fragapane (GBR)	15.000	10	13.466	49	13.133	60	14.400	6	55.999	13
Gabrielle Jupp (GBR)	14.033	56	13.066	72	12.600	93	13.400	35	53.099	37
Hannah Whelan (GBR)	14.100	49			13.966	19	12.633	94		
Kelly Simm (GBR)	14.700	21	12.433	105			13.233	44		
Becky Downie (GBR)			15.166	6	14.200	12				
Italy	57.965	6	54.231	8	54.098	8	56.165	2	222.459	5
Vanessa Ferrari (ITA)	14.866	12	13.766	35	14.033	15	14.566	4	57.231	7
Erika Fasana (ITA)	14.833	14	13.466	50	12.866	76	14.233	7	55.398	18
Giorgia Campana (ITA)	13.800	93	13.466	50	13.766	25				
Lara Mori (ITA)			13.533	42	13.433	43	13.900	12		
Martina Rizzelli (ITA)	14.466	29	12.266	115			11.600	169		
Lavinia Marongiu (ITA)	13.783	103			12.633	91	13.466	31		
Japan	57.266	8	55.298	6	55.464	3	53.332	8	221.360	6
Asuka Teramoto (JPN)	14.333	32	14.266	19	14.266	10	13.466	30	56.331	12
Natsumi Sasada (JPN)	14.033	56	13.966	23	13.533	36	13.600	22	55.132	20
Wakana Inoue (JPN)	14.200	39	13.466	47	13.566	33				
Mai Murakami (JPN)	14.700	21	13.533	41			12.775	77		
Azumi Ishikura (JPN)	13.633	126			13.966	18	13.200	47		
Yu Minobe (JPN)			13.533	42	13.666	29	13.066	58		
Romania	58.565	3	49.999	25	55.331	4	55.866	3	219.261	7
Larisa Iordache (ROU)	15.133	5	13.233	62	15.066	2	14.933	2	58.365	3
Ștefania Stănilă (ROU)	14.866	12	13.233	59	13.066	68	13.600	23	54.765	24
Anamaria Ocolișan (ROU)	14.800	17	10.033	187	12.066	136	13.800	13	50.699	75
Andreea Munteanu (ROU)					13.833	24	13.533	28		
Silvia Zarzu (ROU)	13.766	104					12.666	89		
Paula Tudorache (ROU)			13.000	74	13.366	45				
Australia	55.807	16	55.998	5	54.065	9	52.264	12		
Georgia-Rose Brown (AUS)	14.133	43	13.666	37	13.333	47	13.566	26	54.698	25
Kiara Munteanu (AUS)	13.908	75	13.866	30	13.166	56	11.500	177	52.440	47
Olivia Vivian (AUS)	12.966	191	13.800	32	13.066	65	12.366	116	52.198	51
Mary-Anne Monckton (AUS)	13.800	93	13.333	55	13.300	49				
Emma Nedov (AUS)	13.966	67			14.266	11	12.166	127		
Larrissa Miller (AUS)			14.666	11			14.166	8		

Lauren Mitchell was due to compete in the line up for the Australian women's team, but suffered an ankle injury in training before the qualification competition and was unable to compete.

== Individual all-around ==
Rank	Gymnast	Nation	Vault (gymnastics)	Uneven bars	Balance beam	Floor (gymnastics)	Total	Qual.
1	Simone Biles	United States	15.800	13.300	15.133	15.366	59.599	Q
2	Aliya Mustafina	Russia	14.900	15.166	14.308	14.500	58.874	Q
3	Larisa Iordache	Romania	15.133	13.233	15.066	14.933	58.365	Q
4	Yao Jinnan	China	14.833	15.666	14.900	12.633	58.032	Q
5	Kyla Ross	United States	15.100	14.650	14.391	13.800	57.941	Q
6	MyKayla Skinner	United States	15.666	13.900	13.533	14.700	57.799	–
7	Vanessa Ferrari	Italy	14.866	13.766	14.033	14.566	57.231	Q
8	Shang Chunsong	China	13.966	14.558	14.633	13.966	57.123	Q
9	Ruby Harrold	Great Britain	14.600	14.733	13.700	13.733	56.766	Q
10	Alla Sosnitskaya	Russia	15.133	14.408	13.666	13.533	56.740	Q
11	Roxana Popa	Spain	14.833	14.033	13.366	14.166	56.398	Q
12	Asuka Teramoto	Japan	14.333	14.266	14.266	13.466	56.331	Q
13	Claudia Fragapane	Great Britain	15.000	13.466	13.133	14.400	55.999	Q
14	Madison Kocian	United States	14.133	14.300	13.900	13.633	55.966	–
15	Ekaterina Kramarenko	Russia	14.466	14.766	13.566	13.066	55.864	–
16	Marta Pihan-Kulesza	Poland	14.066	13.933	13.766	13.900	55.665	Q
17	Ellie Black	Canada	14.300	13.766	14.466	13.000	55.532	Q
18	Erika Fasana	Italy	14.833	13.466	12.866	14.233	55.398	Q
19	Lisa Katharina Hill	Germany	14.033	15.100	13.200	12.900	55.233	Q
20	Natsumi Sasada	Japan	14.033	13.966	13.533	13.600	55.132	Q
21	Giulia Steingruber	Switzerland	15.300	13.500	14.033	12.133	54.966	Q
22	Jessica López	Venezuela	14.800	14.433	13.000	12.733	54.966	Q
23	Elsa García	Mexico	14.100	13.600	13.500	13.633	54.833	Q
24	Ștefania Stănilă	Romania	14.866	13.233	13.066	13.600	54.765	Q
25	Georgia-Rose Brown	Australia	14.133	13.666	13.333	13.566	54.698	Q
26	Ana Filipa Martins	Portugal	13.900	13.900	13.266	13.466	54.532	Q
27	Laura Waem	Belgium	13.800	13.908	13.433	13.100	54.241	Q
28	Vasiliki Millousi	Greece	13.400	13.233	14.100	13.200	53.933	R
29	Isabela Onyshko	Canada	13.733	13.933	13.133	13.100	53.899	R
30	Lisa Verschueren	Belgium	13.666	13.433	13.466	13.300	53.865	R
31	Kim Bui	Germany	14.133	13.966	13.833	11.833	53.765	R
32	Marine Brevet	France	5.000 13.766 ﴾104﴿	5.400 12.766 ﴾86﴿	5.500 14.000 ﴾17﴿	5.300 13.066 ﴾60﴿	53.598	
33	Céline van Gerner	Netherlands	5.000 13.833 ﴾88﴿	4.800 13.300 ﴾56﴿	5.500 13.600 ﴾31﴿	4.900 12.733 ﴾82﴿	53.466	
34	Daniele Hypólito	Brazil	5.300 14.333 ﴾32﴿	4.900 12.400 ﴾107﴿	5.700 13.200 ﴾55﴿	5.400 13.466 ﴾31﴿	53.399	
35	Sophie Scheder	Germany	5.000 14.166 ﴾41﴿	5.800 12.766 ﴾87﴿	5.500 13.166 ﴾58﴿	5.000 13.200 ﴾46﴿	53.298	
36	Noémi Makra	Hungary	5.000 14.083 ﴾53﴿	5.700 13.866 ﴾31﴿	5.400 12.433 ﴾105﴿	4.800 12.733 ﴾83﴿	53.115	
37	Gabrielle Jupp	United Kingdom	5.000 14.033 ﴾56﴿	5.600 13.066 ﴾72﴿	5.500 12.600 ﴾93﴿	5.100 13.400 ﴾35﴿	53.099	
38	Julie Croket	Belgium	4.600 13.700 ﴾116﴿	4.700 12.700 ﴾88﴿	5.100 12.866 ﴾75﴿	5.300 13.833 ﴾14﴿	53.099	
39	Alexa Moreno	Mexico	6.200 14.800 ﴾17﴿	5.400 12.666 ﴾91﴿	5.300 13.166 ﴾56﴿	5.400 12.366 ﴾117﴿	52.998	
40	Maartje Ruikes	Netherlands	5.000 13.833 ﴾88﴿	5.400 13.133 ﴾68﴿	5.400 13.000 ﴾71﴿	5.200 12.933 ﴾68﴿	52.899	
41	Pauline Schäfer	Germany	5.400 14.666 ﴾24﴿	5.000 12.433 ﴾104﴿	5.700 13.233 ﴾51﴿	5.500 12.566 ﴾101﴿	52.898	
42	Ana Sofía Gómez	Guatemala	5.800 14.566 ﴾27﴿	5.600 13.000 ﴾76﴿	6.100 12.566 ﴾97﴿	5.600 12.766 ﴾80﴿	52.898	
43	Emma Larsson	Sweden	5.000 13.933 ﴾72﴿	5.400 12.233 ﴾120﴿	5.700 13.866 ﴾22﴿	5.300 12.800 ﴾76﴿	52.832	
44	Lieke Wevers	Netherlands	4.200 13.033 ﴾189﴿	5.800 13.366 ﴾54﴿	4.800 12.833 ﴾77﴿	5.000 13.533 ﴾27﴿	52.765	
45	Yun Na-rae	South Korea	5.000 14.033 ﴾56﴿	5.500 13.566 ﴾40﴿	5.700 12.333 ﴾111﴿	5.200 12.766 ﴾78﴿	52.698	
46	Mariana Oliveira	Brazil	5.300 14.300 ﴾36﴿	5.400 12.866 ﴾81﴿	5.200 13.066 ﴾66﴿	5.300 12.400 ﴾115﴿	52.632	
47	Kiara Munteanu	Australia	5.000 13.908 ﴾75﴿	5.600 13.866 ﴾30﴿	5.300 13.166 ﴾56﴿	5.100 11.500 ﴾177﴿	52.44	
48	Kang Yong-mi	North Korea	5.000 13.700 ﴾116﴿	5.700 14.033 ﴾21﴿	5.300 12.633 ﴾90﴿	5.200 12.066 ﴾134﴿	52.432	
49	Elisa Hämmerle	Austria	5.200 14.000 ﴾63﴿	4.300 12.133 ﴾122﴿	5.400 13.300 ﴾48﴿	5.200 12.833 ﴾74﴿	52.266	
50	Gaelle Mys	Belgium	5.000 13.966 ﴾67﴿	5.100 12.266 ﴾114﴿	5.600 12.433 ﴾106﴿	5.400 13.566 ﴾25﴿	52.231	
51	Olivia Vivian	Australia	4.400 12.966 ﴾191﴿	5.400 13.800 ﴾32﴿	5.100 13.066 ﴾65﴿	5.400 12.366 ﴾116﴿	52.198	
52	Victoria-Kayen Woo	Canada	5.000 13.866 ﴾82﴿	5.300 13.266 ﴾58﴿	5.400 11.908 ﴾146﴿	4.900 13.066 ﴾57﴿	52.106	
53	Katarzyna Jurkowska-Kowalska	Poland	5.000 13.733 ﴾110﴿	4.800 13.000 ﴾73﴿	5.700 12.600 ﴾95﴿	5.200 12.733 ﴾84﴿	52.066	
54	Julie Sinmon	Brazil	5.000 14.033 ﴾56﴿	4.500 12.433 ﴾102﴿	5.300 13.433 ﴾42﴿	5.300 12.133 ﴾131﴿	52.032	
55	Chen Siyi	China	5.800 14.333 ﴾32﴿	5.500 11.458 ﴾142﴿	5.900 13.533 ﴾38﴿	5.700 12.533 ﴾106﴿	51.857	
56	Jasmin Mader	Austria	5.000 13.866 ﴾82﴿	5.000 13.000 ﴾74﴿	4.800 12.700 ﴾83﴿	4.800 12.266 ﴾123﴿	51.832	
57	Kim Chae-yeon	South Korea	5.000 13.633 ﴾126﴿	5.300 12.633 ﴾93﴿	5.300 13.033 ﴾69﴿	5.300 12.533 ﴾105﴿	51.832	
58	Dorina Böczögő	Hungary	4.600 13.666 ﴾120﴿	4.900 13.100 ﴾69﴿	5.000 11.733 ﴾160﴿	5.400 13.300 ﴾39﴿	51.799	
59	Dilnoza Abdusalimova	Uzbekistan	4.600 13.466 ﴾141﴿	4.700 12.533 ﴾99﴿	5.000 13.133 ﴾59﴿	5.100 12.666 ﴾88﴿	51.798	
60	Kim Un-hyang	North Korea	5.000 13.800 ﴾93﴿	5.300 12.800 ﴾84﴿	5.600 13.566 ﴾35﴿	5.100 11.566 ﴾172﴿	51.732	
61	Maegan Chant	Canada	5.200 14.066 ﴾54﴿	5.000 12.900 ﴾78﴿	5.500 11.566 ﴾172﴿	5.800 13.100 ﴾55﴿	51.632	
62	Kristýna Pálešová	Czech Republic	5.000 13.900 ﴾76﴿	5.500 13.800 ﴾33﴿	5.200 12.100 ﴾133﴿	5.000 11.800 ﴾157﴿	51.6	
63	Kim Singmuang	Sweden	5.000 13.666 ﴾120﴿	5.600 13.500 ﴾45﴿	4.500 12.516 ﴾100﴿	4.500 11.800 ﴾156﴿	51.482	
64	Catalina Escobar	Colombia	5.800 14.558 ﴾28﴿	5.200 12.133 ﴾125﴿	5.100 11.666 ﴾163﴿	5.400 13.100 ﴾53﴿	51.457	
65	Ivet Rojas	Venezuela	5.000 13.900 ﴾76﴿	5.100 13.200 ﴾63﴿	5.100 12.200 ﴾120﴿	5.100 12.133 ﴾132﴿	51.433	
66	Argyro Afrati	Greece	4.800 13.866 ﴾82﴿	5.100 10.600 ﴾170﴿	5.100 13.100 ﴾63﴿	5.700 13.800 ﴾17﴿	51.366	
67	Anna-Mária Kányai	Czech Republic	4.400 13.116 ﴾182﴿	5.500 13.166 ﴾66﴿	4.600 12.133 ﴾128﴿	4.700 12.733 ﴾81﴿	51.148	
68	Letícia Costa	Brazil	5.000 14.158 ﴾42﴿	5.100 11.900 ﴾132﴿	5.100 12.566 ﴾96﴿	5.400 12.500 ﴾108﴿	51.124	
69	Tünde Csillag	Hungary	5.200 13.800 ﴾93﴿	4.500 12.233 ﴾119﴿	4.400 11.966 ﴾139﴿	5.400 13.100 ﴾53﴿	51.099	
70	Anna Pavlova	Azerbaijan	5.300 12.933 ﴾193﴿	4.500 12.833 ﴾82﴿	5.100 12.166 ﴾123﴿	4.700 13.166 ﴾48﴿	51.098	
71	Angelina Kysla	Ukraine	5.000 14.033 ﴾56﴿	5.200 11.433 ﴾145﴿	5.300 12.500 ﴾101﴿	5.500 13.100 ﴾52﴿	51.066	
72	Ailen Valente	Argentina	5.000 14.108 ﴾48﴿	4.800 12.300 ﴾111﴿	4.400 11.633 ﴾165﴿	5.000 12.966 ﴾65﴿	51.007	
73	Hong Un-jong	North Korea	6.300 15.833 ﴾1﴿	4.300 10.200 ﴾183﴿	5.500 11.566 ﴾172﴿	5.700 13.266 ﴾43﴿	50.865	
74	Lisa Top	Netherlands	5.300 14.400 ﴾31﴿	4.300 10.600 ﴾169﴿	5.300 12.700 ﴾85﴿	5.400 13.066 ﴾59﴿	50.766	
75	Anamaria Ocolișan	Romania	5.800 14.800 ﴾17﴿	3.600 10.033 ﴾187﴿	5.500 12.066 ﴾136﴿	5.500 13.800 ﴾16﴿	50.699	
76	Clara Chambellant	France	5.000 13.500 ﴾136﴿	4.600 12.866 ﴾80﴿	5.300 13.500 ﴾39﴿	4.600 10.800 ﴾198﴿	50.666	
77	Park Ji-soo	South Korea	5.000 13.800 ﴾93﴿	5.300 11.000 ﴾159﴿	5.700 13.233 ﴾51﴿	5.100 12.633 ﴾92﴿	50.666	
78	Luca Divéky	Hungary	4.800 13.866 ﴾82﴿	4.600 12.533 ﴾98﴿	4.600 11.833 ﴾152﴿	5.000 12.433 ﴾113﴿	50.665	
79	Ana Pérez	Spain	5.000 13.900 ﴾76﴿	5.100 11.933 ﴾131﴿	5.300 11.833 ﴾154﴿	5.300 12.933 ﴾69﴿	50.599	
80	Elena Rega	Uzbekistan	4.200 12.766 ﴾198﴿	5.100 12.766 ﴾85﴿	4.800 12.733 ﴾80﴿	4.400 12.333 ﴾118﴿	50.598	
81	Barbora Mokošová	Slovakia	5.000 13.766 ﴾104﴿	5.500 12.300 ﴾112﴿	4.400 11.966 ﴾139﴿	4.600 12.433 ﴾111﴿	50.465	
82	Camila Klesa	Argentina	4.900 13.533 ﴾134﴿	4.900 12.150 ﴾121﴿	4.600 12.100 ﴾130﴿	5.000 12.633 ﴾90﴿	50.416	
83	Paloma Guerrero	Argentina	4.400 13.366 ﴾152﴿	4.100 11.866 ﴾133﴿	5.100 12.166 ﴾123﴿	5.000 13.000 ﴾62﴿	50.398	
84	Ilaria Käslin	Switzerland	5.000 13.916 ﴾74﴿	5.000 11.100 ﴾156﴿	5.400 12.266 ﴾116﴿	5.200 13.100 ﴾50﴿	50.382	
85	Mariana Chiarella	Peru	5.000 13.766 ﴾104﴿	4.700 11.333 ﴾148﴿	5.000 11.966 ﴾142﴿	5.300 13.266 ﴾40﴿	50.331	
86	Isabella Amado	Panama	5.000 13.666 ﴾120﴿	4.400 11.300 ﴾149﴿	5.700 13.133 ﴾62﴿	5.000 12.200 ﴾126﴿	50.299	
87	Stefanie Siegenthaler	Switzerland	4.400 13.266 ﴾165﴿	4.900 12.433 ﴾103﴿	4.800 11.966 ﴾141﴿	5.000 12.566 ﴾99﴿	50.231	
88	Anna Tempero	New Zealand	4.600 13.300 ﴾158﴿	3.100 11.400 ﴾146﴿	5.300 13.066 ﴾67﴿	4.900 12.433 ﴾114﴿	50.199	
89	Claudia Colom	Spain	5.000 13.766 ﴾104﴿	5.200 11.600 ﴾138﴿	4.400 11.566 ﴾168﴿	5.400 13.266 ﴾41﴿	50.198	
90	Ariana Orrego	Peru	5.000 13.733 ﴾110﴿	4.900 11.300 ﴾150﴿	4.700 12.633 ﴾89﴿	5.000 12.466 ﴾110﴿	50.132	
91	Jessica Stabinger	Austria	4.400 13.233 ﴾169﴿	4.800 12.600 ﴾95﴿	5.200 12.333 ﴾109﴿	5.000 11.966 ﴾141﴿	50.132	
92	Marina Nekrasova	Azerbaijan	5.000 13.433 ﴾142﴿	4.000 11.433 ﴾143﴿	5.400 12.600 ﴾92﴿	5.100 12.633 ﴾92﴿	50.099	
93	Tylah Lotter	South Africa	5.000 13.500 ﴾136﴿	4.300 12.000 ﴾128﴿	4.800 12.166 ﴾122﴿	4.600 12.133 ﴾129﴿	49.799	
94	Simona Castro	Chile	5.000 13.766 ﴾104﴿	4.500 12.366 ﴾108﴿	5.000 11.433 ﴾178﴿	4.800 12.133 ﴾130﴿	49.698	
95	Alma Kuc	Poland	5.000 13.633 ﴾126﴿	5.500 13.166 ﴾66﴿	5.300 11.666 ﴾164﴿	4.800 10.933 ﴾193﴿	49.398	
96	Maria Stoffel	Argentina	4.600 13.300 ﴾158﴿	4.600 11.266 ﴾151﴿	4.500 11.766 ﴾157﴿	4.900 13.000 ﴾63﴿	49.332	
97	Ellis O'Reilly	Ireland	4.400 13.333 ﴾155﴿	4.400 12.566 ﴾97﴿	4.800 11.933 ﴾144﴿	4.700 11.500 ﴾176﴿	49.332	
98	Claudia Cummins	South Africa	5.000 13.800 ﴾93﴿	4.700 12.066 ﴾126﴿	5.400 11.566 ﴾171﴿	4.900 11.766 ﴾158﴿	49.198	
99	Melba Avendaño	Colombia	4.400 13.316 ﴾157﴿	5.000 12.666 ﴾90﴿	4.600 10.966 ﴾192﴿	5.000 12.233 ﴾125﴿	49.181	
100	Charlotte Sullivan	New Zealand	4.700 13.433 ﴾142﴿	4.700 11.500 ﴾139﴿	5.500 12.600 ﴾93﴿	5.400 11.600 ﴾168﴿	49.133	
101	Phan Thị Hà Thanh	Vietnam	5.800 14.700 ﴾21﴿	3.1 9.833 ﴾189﴿	5.100 12.266 ﴾115﴿	5.500 12.333 ﴾120﴿	49.132	
102	Farah Ann Abdul Hadi	Malaysia	5.000 13.233 ﴾169﴿	4.400 10.633 ﴾168﴿	5.200 12.300 ﴾113﴿	5.100 12.966 ﴾66﴿	49.132	
103	Yana Fedorova	Ukraine	5.000 14.133 ﴾43﴿	4.400 10.866 ﴾162﴿	5.400 13.033 ﴾70﴿	5.100 11.000 ﴾192﴿	49.032	
104	Krystyna Sankova	Ukraine	5.000 14.200 ﴾39﴿	5 9.633 ﴾193﴿	5.700 13.200 ﴾54﴿	5.200 11.933 ﴾143﴿	48.966	
105	Anna Pakkala	Finland	4.400 13.266 ﴾165﴿	4.500 12.475 ﴾101﴿	4.200 12.133 ﴾127﴿	4.800 11.066 ﴾190﴿	48.94	
106	Ioanna Xoulogi	Greece	4.200 12.333 ﴾211﴿	5.100 11.966 ﴾130﴿	5.100 11.900 ﴾148﴿	4.600 12.466 ﴾109﴿	48.665	
107	Bianca Mann	South Africa	4.800 13.500 ﴾136﴿	5.100 11.833 ﴾134﴿	4.800 11.300 ﴾183﴿	4.900 12.000 ﴾140﴿	48.633	
108	Merlina Galera	Argentina	5.000 13.166 ﴾180﴿	4.700 11.600 ﴾137﴿	4.600 11.533 ﴾175﴿	4.800 12.333 ﴾119﴿	48.632	
109	Anastasiya Ilnytska	Ukraine	5.000 13.800 ﴾93﴿	4.800 11.133 ﴾155﴿	5.000 11.733 ﴾161﴿	5.200 11.866 ﴾150﴿	48.532	
110	Valentina Brostella	Panama	5.000 13.700 ﴾116﴿	3.300 10.066 ﴾185﴿	4.900 12.433 ﴾104﴿	5.000 12.300 ﴾121﴿	48.499	
111	Maciel Peña	Venezuela	5.000 13.366 ﴾152﴿	5.000 12.250 ﴾117﴿	5.000 12.266 ﴾114﴿	5.000 10.600 ﴾203﴿	48.482	
112	Maria Simou	Greece	5.000 13.566 ﴾131﴿	4.700 10.300 ﴾177﴿	5.100 11.533 ﴾176﴿	4.400 12.600 ﴾96﴿	47.999	
113	Nancy Mohamed Taman	Egypt	4.600 13.566 ﴾131﴿	3.700 10.633 ﴾167﴿	4.900 12.100 ﴾131﴿	4.800 11.700 ﴾162﴿	47.999	
114	Yulia Inshina	Azerbaijan	5.000 13.400 ﴾147﴿	3.000 10.533 ﴾172﴿	5.100 12.100 ﴾132﴿	4.800 11.566 ﴾171﴿	47.599	
115	Maria Smirnova	Azerbaijan	4.800 13.400 ﴾147﴿	3.700 10.866 ﴾161﴿	3.800 11.233 ﴾189﴿	5.100 12.033 ﴾135﴿	47.532	
116	Freyja Jósepsdóttir	Iceland	4.800 13.433 ﴾142﴿	4.800 10.433 ﴾173﴿	4.100 11.766 ﴾156﴿	4.500 11.733 ﴾159﴿	47.365	
117	Sarah Beck	Ireland	4.200 12.733 ﴾199﴿	4.000 11.033 ﴾158﴿	4.100 11.733 ﴾158﴿	4.400 11.866 ﴾147﴿	47.365	
118	Đỗ Thị Vân Anh	Vietnam	5.000 13.933 ﴾72﴿	2.800 10.300 ﴾176﴿	5.200 11.366 ﴾182﴿	4.800 11.700 ﴾163﴿	47.299	
119	Angela Maguire	South Africa	4.600 13.333 ﴾155﴿	4.900 10.300 ﴾178﴿	5.100 11.600 ﴾167﴿	4.800 12.033 ﴾136﴿	47.266	
120	Annika Urvikko	Finland	5.000 13.800 ﴾93﴿	4.600 10.066 ﴾186﴿	5.100 11.566 ﴾170﴿	4.800 11.700 ﴾163﴿	47.132	
121	Lo Yu-Ju	Chinese Taipei	5.000 13.533 ﴾134﴿	3.200 10.200 ﴾182﴿	4.500 11.533 ﴾174﴿	4.500 11.833 ﴾153﴿	47.099	
122	Nicole Hein	Peru	4.400 13.100 ﴾183﴿	4.300 11.400 ﴾147﴿	4.200 11.266 ﴾187﴿	4.300 11.333 ﴾182﴿	47.099	
123	Asal Saparbaeva	Uzbekistan	4.800 13.233 ﴾169﴿	4.7 9.433 ﴾199﴿	4.000 11.800 ﴾155﴿	4.800 12.500 ﴾107﴿	46.966	
124	Samara Maxwell	New Zealand	5.000 13.600 ﴾129﴿	3.4 9.600 ﴾194﴿	4.900 11.866 ﴾149﴿	4.900 11.900 ﴾144﴿	46.966	
125	Nicole Wanström	Sweden	5.000 12.266 ﴾212﴿	4.700 12.066 ﴾126﴿	4.600 11.100 ﴾191﴿	4.700 11.533 ﴾174﴿	46.965	
126	Mette Hulgaard	Denmark	4.400 13.133 ﴾181﴿	4.000 10.008 ﴾188﴿	4.400 12.066 ﴾135﴿	4.700 11.733 ﴾160﴿	46.94	
127	Rowan Hazem Wageeh	Egypt	4.400 13.066 ﴾187﴿	4.800 12.000 ﴾129﴿	4.500 10.433 ﴾200﴿	4.800 11.433 ﴾179﴿	46.932	
128	Khilola Doniyorova	Uzbekistan	4.200 12.733 ﴾199﴿	4.900 11.066 ﴾157﴿	4.300 12.000 ﴾138﴿	4.600 10.908 ﴾194﴿	46.707	
129	Petra Fialová	Czech Republic	4.400 13.100 ﴾183﴿	5.200 12.900 ﴾79﴿	4.400 10.133 ﴾209﴿	4.400 10.500 ﴾204﴿	46.633	
130	Zeng Qiyan	Singapore	4.000 12.566 ﴾204﴿	4.500 11.466 ﴾140﴿	3.700 10.733 ﴾197﴿	4.200 11.800 ﴾155﴿	46.565	
131	Sofie Bråten	Norway	4.400 13.100 ﴾183﴿	3.7 9.433 ﴾198﴿	4.700 12.300 ﴾112﴿	4.600 11.700 ﴾161﴿	46.533	
132	Thelma Hermannsdóttir	Iceland	4.600 13.200 ﴾174﴿	3.3 9.500 ﴾197﴿	4.600 12.233 ﴾117﴿	4.500 11.566 ﴾170﴿	46.499	
133	Tereza Ochynská	Czech Republic	4.000 12.566 ﴾204﴿	4.600 11.800 ﴾135﴿	4.500 11.266 ﴾188﴿	4.700 10.800 ﴾199﴿	46.432	
134	Nicole Mawhinney	Ireland	4.600 13.233 ﴾169﴿	4.000 10.833 ﴾163﴿	4.800 11.500 ﴾177﴿	4.900 10.866 ﴾196﴿	46.432	
135	Andrea Camino	Peru	5.000 13.800 ﴾93﴿	4.500 10.833 ﴾164﴿	4.200 10.200 ﴾206﴿	4.500 11.400 ﴾181﴿	46.233	
136	Tan Ing Yueh	Malaysia	4.600 13.433 ﴾142﴿	5 9.666 ﴾192﴿	4.800 10.900 ﴾194﴿	4.500 12.133 ﴾128﴿	46.132	
137	Zhanerke Duisek	Kazakhstan	4.200 12.700 ﴾201﴿	4 9.300 ﴾200﴿	5.600 12.700 ﴾87﴿	4.500 11.233 ﴾185﴿	45.933	
138	Norma Róbertsdóttir	Iceland	5.300 14.100 ﴾49﴿	3.700 10.566 ﴾171﴿	4.000 10.133 ﴾208﴿	4.700 11.100 ﴾188﴿	45.899	
139	Miriam Fouad El-Hajj	Egypt	4.400 13.200 ﴾174﴿	3.2 9.766 ﴾190﴿	5.000 11.300 ﴾185﴿	4.600 11.433 ﴾178﴿	45.699	
140	Vaida Žitinevičiūtė	Lithuania	4.400 12.800 ﴾197﴿	2.900 10.933 ﴾160﴿	4.500 10.333 ﴾202﴿	4.500 11.600 ﴾167﴿	45.666	
141	Demet Mutlu	Turkey	5.000 13.266 ﴾165﴿	5.2 9.600 ﴾195﴿	5.100 10.333 ﴾203﴿	4.600 12.266 ﴾122﴿	45.465	
142	Ralitsa Mileva	Bulgaria	4.800 13.366 ﴾152﴿	3.1 8.808 ﴾205﴿	4.700 11.933 ﴾143﴿	4.400 11.300 ﴾183﴿	45.407	
143	Lin Tseng-Ning	Chinese Taipei	5.000 13.200 ﴾174﴿	4.300 10.200 ﴾183﴿	4.100 10.200 ﴾207﴿	4.500 11.533 ﴾173﴿	45.133	
144	Wu Jhih-Han	Chinese Taipei	4.400 12.900 ﴾194﴿	2.2 9.700 ﴾191﴿	4.200 11.200 ﴾190﴿	4.600 10.733 ﴾200﴿	44.533	
145	Paola Márquez	Venezuela	4.600 13.300 ﴾158﴿	4.500 10.700 ﴾165﴿	4.8	5.000 10.700 ﴾201﴿	44.433	
146	Anna Geidt	Kazakhstan	4.800 13.400 ﴾147﴿	4 8.850 ﴾204﴿	4.000 10.800 ﴾196﴿	4.700 11.233 ﴾186﴿	44.283	
147	Tan Jiaxin	China	5.800 15.133 ﴾5﴿	6.900 15.333 ﴾3﴿		5.600 13.600 ﴾24﴿	44.066	
148	Ciara Roberts	Ireland	4.000 12.533 ﴾208﴿	3.200 10.233 ﴾180﴿	4.8	4.600 11.233 ﴾184﴿	43.832	
149	Rana El-Bialy	Egypt	4.600 12.266 ﴾212﴿	4.800 10.366 ﴾175﴿	4.3	4.800 10.833 ﴾197﴿	43.431	
150	Chen Feng-chih	Chinese Taipei	4.200 12.466 ﴾209﴿	2.9 8.600 ﴾206﴿	4.100 11.833 ﴾151﴿	3.900 10.466 ﴾205﴿	43.365	
151	Pranati Das	India	4.200 12.600 ﴾203﴿	4.2 9.033 ﴾202﴿	4.700 11.600 ﴾166﴿	4.500 10.033 ﴾207﴿	43.266	
152	Alyssa Baumann	United States	5.800 15.033 ﴾9﴿		6.000 14.066 ﴾14﴿	5.700 14.000 ﴾10﴿	43.099	
153	Sarah El Dabagh	Denmark	4.600 13.300 ﴾158﴿	1.8 8.033 ﴾208﴿	4.500 10.433 ﴾199﴿	4.600 11.100 ﴾189﴿	42.866	
154	Malak Zaghloul	Egypt	4.200 12.566 ﴾204﴿	4.5 8.900 ﴾203﴿	4.6	4.300 11.400 ﴾180﴿	42.599	
155	Aruna Budda Reddy	India	4.600 13.433 ﴾142﴿	3 7.233 ﴾210﴿	4.500 10.833 ﴾195﴿	4.800 11.016 ﴾191﴿	42.515	
156	Youna Dufournet	France	5.000 13.833 ﴾88﴿	6.000 14.400 ﴾17﴿	5.600 13.600 ﴾32﴿		41.833	
157	Bai Yawen	China	5.000 13.666 ﴾120﴿		6.200 14.800 ﴾4﴿	5.300 12.766 ﴾79﴿	41.232	
157	Wakana Inoue	Japan	5.300 14.200 ﴾39﴿	5.000 13.466 ﴾47﴿	5.500 13.566 ﴾33﴿		41.232	
159	Giorgia Campana	Italy	5.000 13.800 ﴾93﴿	5.500 13.466 ﴾50﴿	5.600 13.766 ﴾25﴿		41.032	
160	Mai Murakami	Japan	5.800 14.700 ﴾21﴿	5.000 13.533 ﴾41﴿		5.800 12.775 ﴾77﴿	41.008	
161	Lara Mori	Italy		5.600 13.533 ﴾42﴿	5.400 13.433 ﴾43﴿	5.500 13.900 ﴾12﴿	40.866	
162	Azumi Ishikura	Japan	5.000 13.633 ﴾126﴿		5.500 13.966 ﴾18﴿	5.500 13.200 ﴾47﴿	40.799	
163	Hannah Whelan	United Kingdom	5.000 14.100 ﴾49﴿		5.700 13.966 ﴾19﴿	5.300 12.633 ﴾94﴿	40.699	
164	Maria Kharenkova	Russia	5.000 13.900 ﴾76﴿		6.300 12.933 ﴾74﴿	5.500 13.666 ﴾19﴿	40.499	
165	Mary-Anne Monckton	Australia	5.000 13.800 ﴾93﴿	5.100 13.333 ﴾55﴿	5.900 13.300 ﴾49﴿		40.433	
166	Emma Nedov	Australia	5.000 13.966 ﴾67﴿		5.900 14.266 ﴾11﴿	4.900 12.166 ﴾127﴿	40.398	
167	Kelly Simm	United Kingdom	5.800 14.700 ﴾21﴿	5.400 12.433 ﴾105﴿		5.600 13.233 ﴾44﴿	40.366	
168	Rucha Divekar	India	4.400 13.033 ﴾189﴿	3.1 7.500 ﴾209﴿	4	4.200 10.066 ﴾206﴿	40.365	
169	Yu Minobe	Japan		5.600 13.533 ﴾42﴿	5.600 13.666 ﴾29﴿	5.200 13.066 ﴾58﴿	40.265	
170	Daria Spiridonova	Russia		6.400 15.100 ﴾7﴿	5.500 12.166 ﴾126﴿	4.900 12.833 ﴾73﴿	40.099	
171	Lavinia Marongiu	Italy	5.000 13.783 ﴾103﴿		5.600 12.633 ﴾91﴿	5.400 13.466 ﴾31﴿	39.882	
172	Vera van Pol	Netherlands	4.900 12.900 ﴾194﴿	5.500 13.600 ﴾38﴿		5.500 13.266 ﴾42﴿	39.766	
173	Isabelle Cruz	Brazil	5.000 14.100 ﴾49﴿		5.300 12.700 ﴾85﴿	5.300 12.900 ﴾72﴿	39.7	
174	Claire Martin	France		4.800 13.166 ﴾64﴿	5.700 13.100 ﴾64﴿	4.900 13.400 ﴾34﴿	39.666	
175	Lisa Ecker	Austria	5.000 13.833 ﴾88﴿	4.800 12.833 ﴾83﴿	5.200 12.700 ﴾84﴿		39.366	
175	Ainhoa Carmona	Spain	5.000 13.966 ﴾67﴿		5.300 12.100 ﴾134﴿	5.100 13.300 ﴾37﴿	39.366	
177	Kirsten Peterman	Canada	5.300 14.333 ﴾32﴿	5.200 12.366 ﴾110﴿		5.200 12.600 ﴾97﴿	39.299	
178	Karla Retiz	Mexico		5.500 13.733 ﴾36﴿	5.100 12.933 ﴾73﴿	5.100 12.533 ﴾103﴿	39.199	
179	Cintia Rodríguez	Spain		5.500 13.066 ﴾71﴿	4.700 12.733 ﴾79﴿	4.900 13.333 ﴾36﴿	39.132	
180	Eum Da-yeon	South Korea	5.000 13.733 ﴾110﴿	5.300 12.600 ﴾96﴿	5.000 12.791 ﴾78﴿		39.124	
181	Çağla Akyol	Germany	5.000 13.733 ﴾110﴿		5.500 12.533 ﴾99﴿	5.200 12.808 ﴾75﴿	39.074	
182	Dayana Ardila	Colombia	5.300 13.966 ﴾67﴿		5.200 12.533 ﴾98﴿	5.300 12.566 ﴾100﴿	39.065	
182	Ana Lago	Mexico	5.000 14.233 ﴾38﴿	5.000 12.366 ﴾109﴿	5.200 12.466 ﴾102﴿		39.065	
184	Manon Cormoreche	France	4.600 13.200 ﴾174﴿		5.400 12.708 ﴾81﴿	4.800 12.933 ﴾67﴿	38.841	
185	Olesya Sazonova	Ukraine	5.000 13.900 ﴾76﴿		5.000 11.900 ﴾147﴿	5.100 12.533 ﴾103﴿	38.333	
186	Martina Rizzelli	Italy	5.800 14.466 ﴾29﴿	5.500 12.266 ﴾115﴿		5.400 11.600 ﴾169﴿	38.332	
186	Ahtziri Sandoval	Mexico	5.200 13.566 ﴾131﴿	5.500 13.100 ﴾70﴿		4.700 11.666 ﴾166﴿	38.332	
188	Mira Boumejmajen	France	5.000 13.500 ﴾136﴿	4.600 12.133 ﴾123﴿		4.700 12.666 ﴾86﴿	38.299	
189	Eline Vandersteen	Belgium	4.600 13.666 ﴾120﴿		4.800 11.366 ﴾181﴿	4.800 13.166 ﴾49﴿	38.198	
190	Ri Un-ha	North Korea	5.800 14.625 ﴾25﴿		5.200 11.700 ﴾162﴿	5.400 11.866 ﴾151﴿	38.191	
191	Bibiana Vélez	Colombia	5.000 13.600 ﴾129﴿	5.500 12.266 ﴾115﴿	4.800 12.233 ﴾118﴿		38.099	
191	Amaranta Torres	Mexico	5.000 14.000 ﴾63﴿		5.400 12.133 ﴾129﴿	5.100 11.966 ﴾142﴿	38.099	
193	Evangelia Plyta	Greece	4.400 12.966 ﴾191﴿	6.100 12.633 ﴾94﴿	4.800 12.166 ﴾121﴿		37.765	
194	Simone Penker	Austria	4.400 13.200 ﴾174﴿	4.400 12.233 ﴾118﴿		4.400 12.233 ﴾124﴿	37.666	
195	Nato Dzidziguri	Georgia	4.600 13.700 ﴾116﴿		4.800 11.833 ﴾153﴿	4.000 12.000 ﴾139﴿	37.533	
196	Paula Plichta	Poland	5.000 14.033 ﴾56﴿		4.700 10.933 ﴾193﴿	5.000 12.533 ﴾102﴿	37.499	
197	Ginna Escobar	Colombia	4.400 13.200 ﴾174﴿	4.800 12.400 ﴾106﴿		4.600 11.866 ﴾149﴿	37.466	
198	Enikő Horváth	Hungary	4.400 13.300 ﴾158﴿		4.500 12.333 ﴾108﴿	4.600 11.666 ﴾165﴿	37.299	
199	Zoi Lima	Portugal	4.400 13.066 ﴾187﴿		4.900 11.566 ﴾169﴿	5.100 12.633 ﴾91﴿	37.265	
200	Anastasiya Yekimenka	Belarus	4.200 12.866 ﴾196﴿	0 0.000 ﴾213﴿	4.700 12.433 ﴾103﴿	4.500 11.866 ﴾146﴿	37.165	
201	Courtney McGregor	New Zealand	5.000 13.733 ﴾110﴿	4.100 11.433 ﴾144﴿	4.900 11.866 ﴾150﴿		37.032	
202	Claudia Chmielowska	Poland	5.000 13.841 ﴾87﴿	4.500 11.166 ﴾153﴿		4.700 11.833 ﴾152﴿	36.84	
203	Stina Estberg	Sweden		4.600 11.200 ﴾152﴿	4.700 12.700 ﴾82﴿	5.000 12.666 ﴾87﴿	36.566	
204	Laura Schulte	Switzerland	5.000 13.991 ﴾66﴿	2.7		5.200 12.900 ﴾71﴿	36.091	
205	Franchesca Santi	Chile	5.300 14.133 ﴾43﴿	4.200 10.666 ﴾166﴿		4.800 10.900 ﴾195﴿	35.699	
206	Caterina Barloggio	Switzerland		4.800 12.633 ﴾92﴿	5.000 11.300 ﴾185﴿	4.800 11.500 ﴾175﴿	35.433	
207	Mackenzie Slee	New Zealand	4.400 13.283 ﴾164﴿	2.2		4.900 12.033 ﴾137﴿	34.882	
208	Kim So-yong	North Korea		4.900 10.266 ﴾179﴿	5.600 12.333 ﴾110﴿	4.900 11.900 ﴾144﴿	34.499	
209	Kim Ju-ran	South Korea		5.300 12.500 ﴾100﴿	4.900 11.300 ﴾184﴿	4.000 10.633 ﴾202﴿	34.433	
210	Denise Moloney	Ireland	4.200 12.683 ﴾202﴿		3.2	4.100 11.200 ﴾187﴿	33.649	
211	Veronika Drápalová	Czech Republic	4.400 13.216 ﴾173﴿		4.000 10.200 ﴾205﴿	4.2	32.216	
212	Huang Huidan	China		6.800 15.333 ﴾2﴿	6.000 14.300 ﴾9﴿		29.633	
213	Becky Downie	United Kingdom		6.600 15.166 ﴾6﴿	5.900 14.200 ﴾12﴿		29.366	
213	Tatiana Nabieva	Russia	5.800 14.766 ﴾20﴿	6.000 14.600 ﴾13﴿			29.366	
215	Larrissa Miller	Australia		6.100 14.666 ﴾11﴿		5.800 14.166 ﴾8﴿	28.832	
216	Veronica Wagner	Sweden	5.000 14.000 ﴾63﴿		5.600 13.766 ﴾25﴿		27.766	
217	Andreea Munteanu	Romania			6.300 13.833 ﴾24﴿	5.700 13.533 ﴾28﴿	27.366	
218	Lee Hye-been	South Korea	5.000 13.833 ﴾88﴿			5.100 12.600 ﴾98﴿	26.433	
219	Silvia Zarzu	Romania	5.000 13.766 ﴾104﴿			5.500 12.666 ﴾89﴿	26.432	
220	Paula Tudorache	Romania		5.000 13.000 ﴾74﴿	5.300 13.366 ﴾45﴿		26.366	
221	Payel Bhattacharjee	India		2.4	3.800 10.366 ﴾201﴿	4.2	25.999	
222	Nicole Hitz	Switzerland	4.600 13.300 ﴾158﴿		5.400 12.666 ﴾88﴿		25.966	
223	Gabriela Janik	Poland		5.600 13.533 ﴾42﴿	4.700 12.033 ﴾137﴿		25.566	
224	Cindy Ruíz	Venezuela	4.600 13.266 ﴾165﴿		5.200 12.166 ﴾125﴿		25.432	
225	Michelle Lauritsen	Denmark	4.400 13.100 ﴾183﴿	4.500 12.266 ﴾113﴿			25.366	
226	Hiu Ying Angel Wong	Hong Kong	5.200 13.500 ﴾136﴿		4.900 11.366 ﴾180﴿		24.866	
226	Jong Un-gyong	North Korea	5.000 13.400 ﴾147﴿	5.300 11.466 ﴾141﴿			24.866	
228	Olivia Jochum	Austria			4.700 12.366 ﴾107﴿	4.700 12.433 ﴾112﴿	24.799	
229	Marta Costa	Spain	4.000 12.566 ﴾204﴿	5.100 12.133 ﴾124﴿			24.699	
230	Marcela Sandoval	Colombia		4.900 12.900 ﴾77﴿	4.500 11.366 ﴾179﴿		24.266	
231	Choi Nim Yan	Hong Kong	5.200 12.466 ﴾209﴿		4.400 11.733 ﴾159﴿		24.199	
232	Katriel de Sousa	Venezuela		4.200 10.233 ﴾181﴿		5.300 12.033 ﴾138﴿	22.266	
233	Valērija Grišāne	Latvia		2.9	4.700 12.200 ﴾119﴿		20.3	
234	Ashton Locklear	United States		6.500 15.233 ﴾4﴿			15.233	
235	Jonna Adlerteg	Sweden		6.300 14.100 ﴾20﴿			14.1	
236	Sanne Wevers	Netherlands			5.800 13.933 ﴾20﴿		13.933	
237	Dipa Karmakar	India	5.200 13.866 ﴾82﴿				13.866	
238	Anastasiya Miklashevich	Belarus		5.100 13.466 ﴾48﴿			13.466	
239	Maria Cecília Cruz	Brazil		5.500 13.366 ﴾53﴿			13.366	
240	Elisabeth Seitz	Germany		5.900 13.233 ﴾61﴿			13.233	
241	Lin Versonnen	Belgium		5.200 13.166 ﴾65﴿			13.166	
242	Daria Matveieva	Ukraine		5.300 12.700 ﴾89﴿			12.7	
243	Pranati Nayak	India		3.6	1.8	0	12.166	
244	Aleeza Yu	Canada			5.700 11.933 ﴾145﴿		11.933	
245	Maria Trichopoulou	Greece				4.400 11.866 ﴾147﴿	11.866	
246	Eszter Romhányi	Hungary		4.800 11.666 ﴾136﴿			11.666	
247	Farah Mahmoud	Qatar		4.100 11.133 ﴾154﴿			11.133	
248	Brittany Robertson	New Zealand			4.800 10.733 ﴾198﴿		10.733	
249	Sabine Goša	Latvia		3.400 10.400 ﴾174﴿			10.4	
250	Britt Reusche	Peru			4.700 10.233 ﴾204﴿		10.233	

== Vault ==
Rank	Gymnast	Nation	D Score	E Score	Pen.	Score 1	D Score	E Score	Pen.	Score 2	Total	Qual.
Rank	Gymnast	Nation	Vault 1				Vault 2				Total	Qual.
1	Simone Biles	United States	6.300	9.500		15.800	5.600	9.500		15.100	15.450	Q
2	Hong Un-jong	North Korea	6.300	9.533		15.833	6.400	8.575	−0.1	14.875	15.354	Q
3	MyKayla Skinner	United States	6.400	9.266		15.666	5.800	9.233		15.033	15.349	Q
4	Alla Sosnitskaya	Russia	6.400	8.833	−0.1	15.133	5.800	9.100		14.900	15.016	Q
5	Alexa Moreno	Mexico	6.200	8.700	−0.1	14.800	6.000	8.833		14.833	14.816	Q
6	Phan Thị Hà Thanh	Vietnam	5.800	9.000	−0.1	14.700	6.200	8.800	−0.1	14.900	14.800	Q
7	Claudia Fragapane	Great Britain	5.800	9.200		15.000	5.600	8.833		14.433	14.716	Q
8	Giulia Steingruber	Switzerland	6.200	9.100		15.300	5.000	9.100		14.100	14.700	Q
9	Larisa Iordache	Romania	5.800	9.333		15.133	5.200	8.966		14.166	14.649	R
10	Dipa Karmakar	India	5.200	8.666		13.866	7.000	8.100		15.100	14.483	R
11	Ellie Black	Canada	5.500	8.800		14.300	6.200	8.566	−0.1	14.666	14.483	R

== Uneven bars ==
Rank	Gymnast	Nation	D Score	E Score	Pen.	Total	Qual.
1	Yao Jinnan	China	6.900	8.766		15.666	Q
2	Huang Huidan	China	6.800	8.533		15.333	Q
3	Tan Jiaxin	China	6.900	8.433		15.333	–
4	Ashton Locklear	United States	6.500	8.733		15.233	Q
5	Aliya Mustafina	Russia	6.300	8.866		15.166	Q
6	Becky Downie	Great Britain	6.600	8.566		15.166	Q
7	Daria Spiridonova	Russia	6.400	8.700		15.100	Q
8	Lisa Katharina Hill	Germany	6.500	8.600		15.100	Q
9	Ekaterina Kramarenko	Russia	6.000	8.766		14.766	–
10	Ruby Harrold	Great Britain	6.300	8.433		14.733	Q
11	Larrissa Miller	Australia	6.100	8.566		14.666	R
12	Kyla Ross	United States	5.900	8.750		14.650	R
13	Tatiana Nabieva	Russia	6.000	8.600		14.600	–
14	Shang Chunsong	China	6.300	8.258		14.558	–
15	Jessica López	Venezuela	6.400	8.033		14.433	R

== Balance beam ==
Rank	Gymnast	Nation	D Score	E Score	Pen.	Total	Qual.
1	Simone Biles	United States	6.400	8.733		15.133	Q
2	Larisa Iordache	Romania	6.300	8.766		15.066	Q
3	Yao Jinnan	China	6.200	8.700		14.900	Q
4	Bai Yawen	China	6.200	8.600		14.800	Q
5	Shang Chunsong	China	6.200	8.433		14.633	–
6	Ellie Black	Canada	6.500	7.966		14.466	Q
7	Kyla Ross	United States	6.000	8.391		14.391	Q
8	Aliya Mustafina	Russia	5.900	8.408		14.308	Q
9	Huang Huidan	China	6.000	8.300		14.300	–
10	Asuka Teramoto	Japan	5.800	8.466		14.266	Q
11	Emma Nedov	Australia	6.200	8.066		14.266	R
12	Becky Downie	Great Britain	5.900	8.300		14.200	R
13	Vasiliki Millousi	Greece	5.700	8.400		14.100	R

== Floor exercise ==
Rank	Gymnast	Nation	D Score	E Score	Pen.	Total	Qual.
1	Simone Biles	United States	6.500	8.866		15.366	Q
2	Larisa Iordache	Romania	6.200	8.733		14.933	Q
3	MyKayla Skinner	United States	6.400	8.300		14.700	Q
4	Vanessa Ferrari	Italy	6.200	8.366		14.566	Q
5	Aliya Mustafina	Russia	6.000	8.500		14.500	Q
6	Claudia Fragapane	Great Britain	6.000	8.400		14.400	Q
7	Erika Fasana	Italy	6.000	8.233		14.233	Q
8	Larrissa Miller	Australia	5.900	8.266		14.166	Q
9	Roxana Popa	Spain	6.000	8.166		14.166	R
10	Alyssa Baumann	United States	5.700	8.300		14.000	–
11	Shang Chunsong	China	6.000	7.966		13.966	R
12	Lara Mori	Italy	5.500	8.400		13.900	–
13	Marta Pihan-Kulesza	Poland	5.800	8.100		13.900	R
