= Gymnastics at the 2014 Asian Games – Women's uneven bars =

Women's uneven bars at the 2014 Asian Games
- Venue: Namdong Gymnasium
- Date: 22–24 September 2014
- Competitors: 50 from 14 nations

Medalists
gold medal	Yao Jinnan	China
silver medal	Huang Huidan	China
bronze medal	Kang Yong-mi	North Korea

The women's uneven bars competition at the 2014 Asian Games in Incheon, South Korea was held on 22 and 24 September 2014 at the Namdong Gymnasium.

== Schedule ==
All times are Korea Standard Time (UTC+09:00)

Date	Time	Event
Monday, 22 September 2014	11:00	Qualification
Wednesday, 24 September 2014	21:25	Final

== Results ==
=== Qualification ===
Rank	Athlete	Score
1	Yao Jinnan (CHN)	15.650
2	Huang Huidan (CHN)	15.450
3	Tan Jiaxin (CHN)	15.150
4	Chen Siyi (CHN)	14.650
5	Shang Chunsong (CHN)	14.150
6	Yuriko Yamamoto (JPN)	13.750
7	Yun Na-rae (KOR)	13.750
8	Minami Honda (JPN)	13.700
9	Azumi Ishikura (JPN)	13.600
10	Hong Un-jong (PRK)	13.400
11	Sakura Yumoto (JPN)	13.000
12	Kim Un-hyang (PRK)	12.950
13	Jong Un-gyong (PRK)	12.900
14	Akiho Sato (JPN)	12.850
15	Kang Yong-mi (PRK)	12.850
16	Eum Da-yeon (KOR)	12.650
17	Jeong Hee-yeon (KOR)	12.600
17	Kim Chae-yeon (KOR)	12.600
19	Lim Heem Wei (SIN)	12.475
20	Dilnoza Abdusalimova (UZB)	12.450
21	Janessa Dai (SIN)	11.950
22	Park Ji-soo (KOR)	11.900
23	Asal Saparbaeva (UZB)	11.750
24	Elena Rega (UZB)	11.750
25	Arailym Darmenova (KAZ)	11.250
26	Khilola Doniyorova (UZB)	10.850
27	Zhanerke Duisek (KAZ)	10.750
28	Farah Ann Abdul Hadi (MAS)	10.450
29	Đỗ Thị Thu Huyền (VIE)	10.350
30	Đỗ Thị Vân Anh (VIE)	10.200
31	Farah Tarek Mahmoud (QAT)	10.200
32	Dipa Karmakar (IND)	10.150
33	Anna Geidt (KAZ)	10.050
34	Praewpraw Doungchan (THA)	9.950
35	Aida Bauyrzhanova (KAZ)	9.900
36	Baatarjavyn Ichinkhorloo (MGL)	9.875
37	Lin Tseng-nung (TPE)	9.850
38	Lo Yu-ju (TPE)	9.750
39	Kim So-yong (PRK)	9.725
40	Pranati Nayak (IND)	9.450
41	Chen Feng-chih (TPE)	9.350
42	Wu Jhih-han (TPE)	9.200
43	Pranati Das (IND)	8.650
44	Fan Chieh-ting (TPE)	8.050
45	Payel Bhattacharjee (IND)	7.900
46	Aruna Reddy (IND)	7.650
47	Batbaataryn Soyolsaikhan (MGL)	7.600
48	Yekaterina Chuikina (KAZ)	7.300
49	Enkhtüvshingiin Batmaa (MGL)	7.200
50	Oksana Chusovitina (UZB)	0.000

=== Final ===
Rank	Athlete	Score
1st place, gold medalist(s)	Yao Jinnan (CHN)	15.466
2nd place, silver medalist(s)	Huang Huidan (CHN)	14.375
3rd place, bronze medalist(s)	Kang Yong-mi (PRK)	13.633
4	Yuriko Yamamoto (JPN)	13.600
5	Minami Honda (JPN)	13.533
6	Eum Da-yeon (KOR)	13.300
7	Yun Na-rae (KOR)	13.125
8	Hong Un-jong (PRK)	0.000
