= Gymnastics at the 2014 Asian Games – Women's floor =

Schedule and results of the women's floor competition at the 2014 Asian Games

Women's floor at the 2014 Asian Games
- Venue: Namdong Gymnasium
- Date: 22–25 September 2014
- Competitors: 50 from 14 nations

Medalists
gold medal	Yao Jinnan	China
silver medal	Shang Chunsong	China
bronze medal	Yun Na-rae	South Korea

The women's floor competition at the 2014 Asian Games in Incheon, South Korea was held on 22 and 25 September 2014 at the Namdong Gymnasium.

== Schedule ==
All times are Korea Standard Time (UTC+09:00)

Date	Time	Event
Monday, 22 September 2014	11:00	Qualification
Thursday, 25 September 2014	20:35	Final

== Results ==
=== Qualification ===
Rank	Athlete	Score
1	Shang Chunsong (CHN)	13.950
2	Yao Jinnan (CHN)	13.800
3	Chen Siyi (CHN)	13.775
4	Phan Thị Hà Thanh (VIE)	13.500
5	Yun Na-rae (KOR)	13.400
6	Kang Yong-mi (PRK)	13.400
7	Akiho Sato (JPN)	13.250
8	Park Ji-soo (KOR)	13.250
9	Farah Ann Abdul Hadi (MAS)	13.225
10	Hong Un-jong (PRK)	13.200
11	Yuriko Yamamoto (JPN)	13.150
12	Lee Hye-been (KOR)	13.150
13	Dilnoza Abdusalimova (UZB)	13.050
14	Azumi Ishikura (JPN)	13.000
15	Asal Saparbaeva (UZB)	12.900
16	Kim Un-hyang (PRK)	12.800
17	Kim So-yong (PRK)	12.800
18	Angel Wong (HKG)	12.750
19	Elena Rega (UZB)	12.650
20	Zhanerke Duisek (KAZ)	12.650
21	Anna Geidt (KAZ)	12.650
22	Arailym Darmenova (KAZ)	12.600
23	Aida Bauyrzhanova (KAZ)	12.600
24	Lim Heem Wei (SIN)	12.550
25	Jeong Hee-yeon (KOR)	12.500
26	Ri Un-ha (PRK)	12.400
27	Lo Yu-ju (TPE)	12.250
28	Đỗ Thị Vân Anh (VIE)	12.200
29	Khilola Doniyorova (UZB)	12.150
30	Mizuho Nagai (JPN)	12.050
31	Chen Feng-chih (TPE)	12.000
32	Tan Jiaxin (CHN)	11.950
33	Joey Tam (SIN)	11.900
34	Fan Chieh-ting (TPE)	11.850
35	Lin Tseng-nung (TPE)	11.850
36	Bai Yawen (CHN)	11.700
37	Sakura Yumoto (JPN)	11.700
38	Yekaterina Chuikina (KAZ)	11.600
39	Aruna Reddy (IND)	11.300
40	Đỗ Thị Thu Huyền (VIE)	11.150
41	Dipa Karmakar (IND)	11.150
42	Kim Chae-yeon (KOR)	11.050
43	Pranati Nayak (IND)	10.850
44	Pranati Das (IND)	10.750
45	Praewpraw Doungchan (THA)	10.600
46	Wu Jhih-han (TPE)	10.575
47	Baatarjavyn Ichinkhorloo (MGL)	10.300
48	Rucha Divekar (IND)	10.200
49	Batbaataryn Soyolsaikhan (MGL)	8.600
50	Oksana Chusovitina (UZB)	0.000

=== Final ===
Rank	Athlete	Score
1st place, gold medalist(s)	Yao Jinnan (CHN)	13.966
2nd place, silver medalist(s)	Shang Chunsong (CHN)	13.800
3rd place, bronze medalist(s)	Yun Na-rae (KOR)	13.700
4	Akiho Sato (JPN)	13.500
5	Kang Yong-mi (PRK)	13.366
6	Park Ji-soo (KOR)	13.333
7	Farah Ann Abdul Hadi (MAS)	13.266
8	Phan Thị Hà Thanh (VIE)	13.033
