= Gymnastics at the 2014 Asian Games =

- Venue: Namdong Gymnasium
- Dates: 21 September – 2 October 2014
- Competitors: 187 from 23 nations

Gymnastics at the 2014 Asian Games was held at Namdong Gymnasium in Incheon, South Korea from September 21 to October 2, 2014.

== Schedule ==
Q	Qualification	F	Final

Event↓/Date →	21st Sun	22nd Mon	23rd Tue	24th Wed	25th Thu	26th Fri		27th Sat	28th Sun	29th Mon	30th Tue	1st Wed	2nd Thu
Artistic
Men's team	F												
Men's individual all-around	Q		F										
Men's floor	Q			F									
Men's pommel horse	Q			F									
Men's rings	Q			F									
Men's vault	Q				F								
Men's parallel bars	Q				F								
Men's horizontal bar	Q				F								
Women's team		F											
Women's individual all-around		Q	F										
Women's vault		Q		F									
Women's uneven bars		Q		F									
Women's balance beam		Q			F								
Women's floor		Q			F								
Rhythmic
Women's team												F	
Women's individual all-around												Q	F
Trampoline
Men's individual						Q	F						
Women's individual						Q	F						

== Medalists ==
=== Men's artistic ===
Event	Gold	Silver	Bronze
Team	Japan; Tomomasa Hasegawa; Yuya Kamoto; Yusuke Saito; Shotaro Shirai; Kazuyuki Takeda; Masayoshi Yamamoto	South Korea; Kim Hee-hoon; Lee Hyeok-jung; Lee Sang-wook; Park Min-soo; Shin Dong-hyen; Yang Hak-seon	China; Huang Xi; Huang Yuguo; Liao Junlin; Wang Peng; Yang Shengchao; Zou Kai
Individual all-around	Yuya Kamoto; Japan	Masayoshi Yamamoto; Japan	Lee Sang-wook; South Korea
Floor	Zou Kai; China	Huang Yuguo; China	Yuya Kamoto; Japan
Pommel horse	Masayoshi Yamamoto; Japan	Abdulla Azimov; Uzbekistan	Park Min-soo; South Korea
Rings	Liao Junlin; China	Kazuyuki Takeda; Japan	Đặng Nam; Vietnam
Vault	Shek Wai Hung; Hong Kong	Yang Hak-seon; South Korea	Huang Xi; China
Parallel bars	Yuya Kamoto; Japan	Anton Fokin; Uzbekistan	Đinh Phương Thành; Vietnam
Horizontal bar	Zou Kai; China	Yusuke Saito; Japan	Masayoshi Yamamoto; Japan

=== Women's artistic ===
Event	Gold	Silver	Bronze
Team	China; Bai Yawen; Chen Siyi; Huang Huidan; Shang Chunsong; Tan Jiaxin; Yao Jinnan	North Korea; Hong Un-jong; Jong Un-gyong; Kang Yong-mi; Kim So-yong; Kim Un-hyang; Ri Un-ha	Japan; Minami Honda; Azumi Ishikura; Mizuho Nagai; Akiho Sato; Yuriko Yamamoto; Sakura Yumoto
Individual all-around	Yao Jinnan; China	Shang Chunsong; China	Yun Na-rae; South Korea
Vault	Hong Un-jong; North Korea	Oksana Chusovitina; Uzbekistan	Phan Thị Hà Thanh; Vietnam
Uneven bars	Yao Jinnan; China	Huang Huidan; China	Kang Yong-mi; North Korea
Balance beam	Kim Un-hyang; North Korea	Phan Thị Hà Thanh; Vietnam	Shang Chunsong; China
Floor	Yao Jinnan; China	Shang Chunsong; China	Yun Na-rae; South Korea

=== Rhythmic ===
Event	Gold	Silver	Bronze
Team	Uzbekistan; Valeriya Davidova; Ravilya Farkhutdinova; Djamila Rakhmatova; Anastasiya Serdyukova	South Korea; Gim Yun-hee; Lee Da-ae; Lee Na-kyung; Son Yeon-jae	Kazakhstan; Sabina Ashirbayeva; Aliya Assymova; Viktoriya Gorbunova; Yekaterina Skorikova
Individual all-around	Son Yeon-jae; South Korea	Deng Senyue; China	Anastasiya Serdyukova; Uzbekistan

=== Trampoline ===
Event	Gold	Silver	Bronze
Men's individual	Dong Dong; China	Tu Xiao; China	Yasuhiro Ueyama; Japan
Women's individual	Li Dan; China	Zhong Xingping; China	Ayano Kishi; Japan

== Medal table ==
Rank	Nation	Gold	Silver	Bronze	Total
1	China (CHN)	9	7	3	19
2	Japan (JPN)	4	3	5	12
3	North Korea (PRK)	2	1	1	4
4	South Korea (KOR)	1	3	4	8
5	Uzbekistan (UZB)	1	3	1	5
6	Hong Kong (HKG)	1	0	0	1
7	Vietnam (VIE)	0	1	3	4
8	Kazakhstan (KAZ)	0	0	1	1
Totals (8 entries)		18	18	18	54

== Participating nations ==
A total of 187 athletes from 23 nations competed in gymnastics at the 2014 Asian Games:

- Bangladesh (1)
- China (20)
- Chinese Taipei (15)
- Hong Kong (3)
- India (12)
- Iran (5)
- Japan (19)
- Kazakhstan (16)
- Kuwait (3)
- Kyrgyzstan (2)
- Malaysia (1)
- Mongolia (6)
- Nepal (2)
- North Korea (12)
- Pakistan (2)
- Philippines (1)
- Qatar (5)
- Saudi Arabia (3)
- Singapore (7)
- South Korea (18)
- Thailand (6)
- Uzbekistan (19)
- Vietnam (9)
