= Gymnastics at the 2008 Summer Olympics – Women's vault =

Women's vault at the Games of the XXIX Olympiad

Medalists
1st place, gold medalist(s)		Hong Un-jong	North Korea
2nd place, silver medalist(s)		Oksana Chusovitina	Germany
3rd place, bronze medalist(s)		Cheng Fei	China

Women's vault competition at the 2008 Summer Olympics was held on August 17 at the Beijing National Indoor Stadium.

The eight competitors (with a maximum of two per nation) with the highest scores in qualifying proceeded to the women's vault finals. There, each gymnast performed two vaults; the scores from the final round (ignoring qualification) determining the final ranking.

== Disputes ==
There was a major controversy concerning the Russian gymnast Anna Pavlova. Her first vault scored a 15.625, placing her in medal contention. On her second vault, she thought she had received confirmation from the judges and, as a result, began before the green light and received a 0.

== Final ==
Rank	Gymnast	Vault 1				Vault 2				Total
Rank	Gymnast	A Score	B Score	Penalty	Vault Score	A Score	B Score	Penalty	Vault Score	Total
Gold medal	Hong Un-jong (PRK)	6.500	9.350	0.300	15.550	6.500	9.250		15.750	15.650
Silver medal	Oksana Chusovitina (GER)	6.300	9.425		15.725	6.000	9.425		15.425	15.575
Bronze medal	Cheng Fei (CHN)	6.500	9.575		16.075	6.500	8.550		15.050	15.562
4	Alicia Sacramone (USA)	6.300	9.450		15.750	5.800	9.525		15.325	15.537
5	Ariella Käslin (SUI)	6.300	9.100		15.400	5.500	9.200		14.700	15.050
6	Carlotta Giovannini (ITA)	5.800	9.225	0.100	14.925	5.900	8.275		14.175	14.550
7	Jade Barbosa (BRA)	5.800	8.925		14.725	5.600	8.650		14.250	14.487
8	Anna Pavlova (RUS)	6.500	9.125		15.625	0.000	0.000		0.000	7.812*

*Pavlova had the second vault disqualified due to a false start.

== Qualified competitors ==
Rank	Gymnast	Vault 1				Vault 2				Total
Rank	Gymnast	A Score	B Score	Penalty	Vault Score	A Score	B Score	Penalty	Vault Score	Total
1	Cheng Fei (CHN)	6.500	9.650		16.150	6.500	9.175		15.675	15.912
2	Hong Un-jong (PRK)	6.500	9.150		15.650	6.500	9.300		15.800	15.725
3	Alicia Sacramone (USA)	6.300	9.550		15.850	5.800	9.600		15.400	15.625
4	Oksana Chusovitina (GER)	6.300	9.500		15.800	5.700	9.550		15.250	15.525
5	Anna Pavlova (RUS)	5.800	9.550		15.350	5.600	9.600		15.200	15.275
6	Carlotta Giovannini (ITA)	5.800	9.300		15.100	5.900	9.275		15.175	15.137
7	Jade Barbosa (BRA)	5.800	9.400	0.100	15.100	5.600	9.400		15.000	15.050
8	Ariella Käslin (SUI)	6.300	8.925		15.225	5.500	9.225		14.725	14.975
