= 2015 World Artistic Gymnastics Championships =

Gymnastics competition

2015 World Artistic Gymnastics Championships

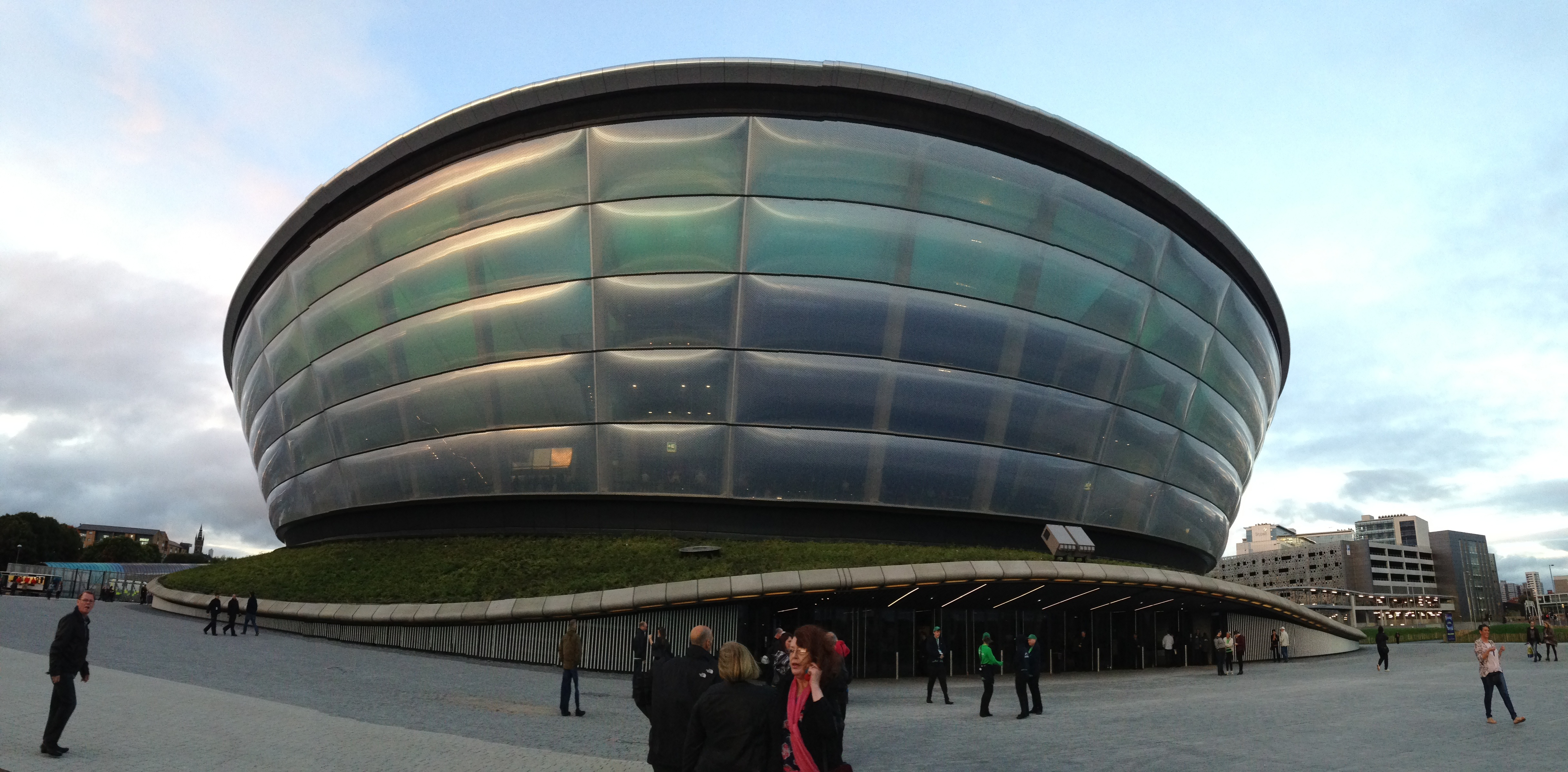
- The SSE Hydro, where the competition took place
- Venue: The SSE Hydro
- Location: Glasgow, United Kingdom
- Start date: 23 October 2015
- End date: 1 November 2015

The 2015 World Artistic Gymnastics Championships was the 46th edition of the Artistic Gymnastics World Championships. The competition was held from 23 October – 1 November 2015 at The SSE Hydro in Glasgow, United Kingdom, and is the first time that Scotland hosted the event. The competition served as a qualification for the 2016 Summer Olympics.

Japan won the men's team all-around competition for the first time since 1978, and the United States won the women's team all-around title for the third straight time. In the individual all-around competitions, Kōhei Uchimura and Simone Biles won their sixth and third successive title, respectively. Qualifying in thirteenth place, team Romania failed to automatically qualify to the Olympic Games for the first time since 1966.

On 4 December 2015, British Gymnastics announced that the event had been named "Sporting Event of the Year" by The Sunday Mail.

== Competition schedule ==
All times are BST (UTC+1) from 23 to 24 October 2015 and GMT (UTC±0) from 25 October to 1 November 2015.

Date	Time	Round
23 October 2015	09:40	Women's qualifying (Day 1 – morning)
23 October 2015	14:40	Women's qualifying (Day 1 – afternoon)
24 October 2015	09:40	Women's qualifying (Day 2 – morning)
24 October 2015	14:40	Women's qualifying (Day 2 – afternoon)
25 October 2015	09:40	Men's qualifying (Day 1 – morning)
25 October 2015	16:10	Men's qualifying (Day 1 – afternoon)
26 October 2015	09:40	Men's qualifying (Day 2 – morning)
26 October 2015	16:10	Men's qualifying (Day 2 – afternoon)
27 October 2015	18:15	Women's team final
28 October 2015	17:30	Men's team final
29 October 2015	18:25	Women's all-around final
30 October 2015	17:45	Men's all-around final
31 October 2015	13:30	Apparatus finals
1 November 2015	13:30	Apparatus finals

== Venue ==
The competition was held in The SSE Hydro, which opened in 2013. This arena hosted the Gymnastics events at the 2014 Commonwealth Games.

== Olympic qualification ==
As is traditional for any World Championships prior to the Olympic year, the Championships served as the first of two qualification rounds for artistic gymnasts to the 2016 Olympics in Rio de Janeiro, Brazil. In the qualification round of Worlds, the top 8 teams in both MAG and WAG competitions received an automatic qualification berth to the Games. Teams placed 9–16th at the World Championships were invited to the 2016 Olympic Test Event in Rio and the top 4 teams from that event made up the 12 teams at the Olympics.

== Medalists ==
Event	Gold	Silver	Bronze
Men
Team all-around	Japan; Naoto Hayasaka; Ryohei Kato; Kazuma Kaya; Kenzō Shirai; Yusuke Tanaka; Kōhei Uchimura; Tomomasa Hasegawa	Great Britain; Brinn Bevan; Daniel Purvis; Louis Smith; Kristian Thomas; Max Whitlock; Nile Wilson; James Hall	China; Deng Shudi; Lin Chaopan; Liu Yang; Xiao Ruoteng; You Hao; Zhang Chenglong; Liu Rongbing
Individual all-around	Kōhei Uchimura (JPN)	Manrique Larduet (CUB)	Deng Shudi (CHN)
Floor	Kenzō Shirai (JPN)	Max Whitlock (GBR)	Rayderley Zapata (ESP)
Pommel horse	Max Whitlock (GBR)	Louis Smith (GBR)	Harutyun Merdinyan (ARM) Kazuma Kaya (JPN)
Rings	Eleftherios Petrounias (GRE)	You Hao (CHN)	Liu Yang (CHN)
Vault	Ri Se-gwang (PRK)	Marian Drăgulescu (ROU)	Donnell Whittenburg (USA)
Parallel bars	You Hao (CHN)	Oleg Verniaiev (UKR)	Oleg Stepko (AZE) Deng Shudi (CHN)
Horizontal bar	Kōhei Uchimura (JPN)	Danell Leyva (USA)	Manrique Larduet (CUB)
Women
Team all-around	United States; Simone Biles; Gabby Douglas; Brenna Dowell; Madison Kocian; Maggie Nichols; Aly Raisman; MyKayla Skinner	China; Chen Siyi; Fan Yilin; Mao Yi; Shang Chunsong; Tan Jiaxin; Wang Yan; Zhu Xiaofang	Great Britain; Becky Downie; Ellie Downie; Claudia Fragapane; Ruby Harrold; Kelly Simm; Amy Tinkler; Charlie Fellows
Individual all-around	Simone Biles (USA)	Gabby Douglas (USA)	Larisa Iordache (ROU)
Vault	Maria Paseka (RUS)	Hong Un-jong (PRK)	Simone Biles (USA)
Uneven bars	Fan Yilin (CHN) Viktoria Komova (RUS) Daria Spiridonova (RUS) Madison Kocian (USA)	None awarded	None awarded
Balance beam	Simone Biles (USA)	Sanne Wevers (NED)	Pauline Schäfer (GER)
Floor	Simone Biles (USA)	Ksenia Afanasyeva (RUS)	Maggie Nichols (USA)

== Medal table ==
The United States led the medal table for second consecutive time, followed by Japan and Russia, while host Great Britain finished 5th with 5 medals.

=== Medal standings ===
==== Overall ====
Rank	Nation	Gold	Silver	Bronze	Total
1	United States (USA)	5	2	3	10
2	Japan (JPN)	4	0	1	5
3	Russia (RUS)	3	1	0	4
4	China (CHN)	2	2	4	8
5	Great Britain (GBR)	1	3	1	5
6	North Korea (PRK)	1	1	0	2
7	Greece (GRE)	1	0	0	1
8	Cuba (CUB)	0	1	1	2
8	Romania (ROU)	0	1	1	2
10	Netherlands (NED)	0	1	0	1
10	Ukraine (UKR)	0	1	0	1
12	Armenia (ARM)	0	0	1	1
12	Azerbaijan (AZE)	0	0	1	1
12	Germany (GER)	0	0	1	1
12	Spain (ESP)	0	0	1	1
Totals (15 entries)		17	13	15	45

==== Men ====
Rank	Nation	Gold	Silver	Bronze	Total
1	Japan	4	0	1	5
2	Great Britain	1	3	0	4
3	China	1	1	4	6
4	Greece	1	0	0	1
4	North Korea	1	0	0	1
6	Cuba	0	1	1	2
6	United States	0	1	1	2
8	Romania	0	1	0	1
8	Ukraine	0	1	0	1
10	Armenia	0	0	1	1
10	Azerbaijan	0	0	1	1
10	Spain	0	0	1	1
Totals (12 entries)		8	8	10	26

==== Women ====
Rank	Nation	Gold	Silver	Bronze	Total
1	United States	5	1	2	8
2	Russia	3	1	0	4
3	China	1	1	0	2
4	Netherlands	0	1	0	1
4	North Korea	0	1	0	1
6	Germany	0	0	1	1
6	Great Britain	0	0	1	1
6	Romania	0	0	1	1
Totals (8 entries)		9	5	5	19

== Men's results ==
=== Team competition ===
Oldest and youngest competitors

	Name	Country	Date of birth	Age
Youngest	Brinn Bevan	Great Britain	16 June 1997	18 years, 4 months and 12 days
Oldest	Yoo Won-chul	South Korea	20 July 1984	31 years, 3 months and 8 days

Rank	Team	Floor (gymnastics)	Pommel horse	Rings (gymnastics)	Vault (gymnastics)	Parallel bars	Horizontal bar	Total
1st place, gold medalist(s)	Japan	47.258 (1)	45.166 (1)	43.798 (5)	45.766 (2)	45.665 (5)	43.165 (7)	270.818
1st place, gold medalist(s)	Naoto Hayasaka	15.133			14.833			270.818
1st place, gold medalist(s)	Ryohei Kato		14.733	14.366		15.533	15.033	270.818
1st place, gold medalist(s)	Kazuma Kaya		15.400					270.818
1st place, gold medalist(s)	Kenzo Shirai	16.325			15.533			270.818
1st place, gold medalist(s)	Yusuke Tanaka			14.466		14.266	13.666	270.818
1st place, gold medalist(s)	Kōhei Uchimura	15.800	15.033	14.966	15.400	15.866	14.466	270.818
2nd place, silver medalist(s)	Great Britain	45.766 (2)	44.999 (2)	43.666 (6)	45.499 (4)	45.532 (6)	44.883 (2)	270.345
2nd place, silver medalist(s)	Brinn Bevan		13.966		15.133			270.345
2nd place, silver medalist(s)	Daniel Purvis	15.400		14.333		15.466		270.345
2nd place, silver medalist(s)	Louis Smith		15.333					270.345
2nd place, silver medalist(s)	Kristian Thomas	14.600			15.333		15.000	270.345
2nd place, silver medalist(s)	Max Whitlock	15.766	15.700	14.400	15.033	15.033	15.000	270.345
2nd place, silver medalist(s)	Nile Wilson			14.933		15.033	14.833	270.345
3rd place, bronze medalist(s)	China	44.565 (4)	41.565 (7)	45.999 (1)	45.666 (3)	47.765 (1)	44.399 (3)	269.959
3rd place, bronze medalist(s)	Deng Shudi	14.966		14.600	15.233	16.066		269.959
3rd place, bronze medalist(s)	Lin Chaopan	15.133	13.466		15.200	15.766	15.333	269.959
3rd place, bronze medalist(s)	Liu Yang			15.766				269.959
3rd place, bronze medalist(s)	Xiao Ruoteng		13.433		15.233		14.233	269.959
3rd place, bronze medalist(s)	You Hao		14.666	15.633		15.933		269.959
3rd place, bronze medalist(s)	Zhang Chenglong	14.466					14.833	269.959
4	Russia	44.366 (5)	43.600 (3)	44.165 (4)	45.900 (1)	46.266 (2)	44.065 (4)	268.362
4	Denis Ablyazin	15.100		14.433	15.700			268.362
4	David Belyavskiy	14.666	14.100	14.866	15.200	15.600	14.566	268.362
4	Nikita Ignatyev			14.866		15.400	14.966	268.362
4	Nikolai Kuksenkov		14.800			15.266	14.533	268.362
4	Nikita Nagornyy	14.600			15.000			268.362
4	Ivan Stretovich		14.700					268.362
5	United States	43.933 (7)	42.032 (6)	45.066 (2)	44.624 (6)	46.133 (3)	46.065 (1)	267.853
5	Chris Brooks						14.933	267.853
5	Danell Leyva		13.100			15.800	15.666	267.853
5	Alexander Naddour	15.100	15.066	14.700	14.466			267.853
5	Paul Ruggeri	14.633			15.100	14.733	15.466	267.853
5	Donnell Whittenburg	14.200	13.866	15.166	15.058	15.600		267.853
5	Brandon Wynn			15.200				267.853
6	Switzerland	44.232 (6)	42.998 (4)	42.165 (8)	43.333 (8)	45.799 (4)	43.133 (8)	261.660
6	Christian Baumann		14.666	13.933		15.266	13.300	261.660
6	Pablo Brägger	14.866		13.766	15.133		15.433	261.660
6	Pascal Bucher		13.666			15.333		261.660
6	Claudio Capelli	14.800			14.300			261.660
6	Oliver Hegi		14.666				14.400	261.660
6	Eddy Yusof	14.566		14.466	13.900	15.200		261.660
7	South Korea	43.082 (8)	42.066 (5)	42.823 (7)	44.999 (5)	43.832 (7)	43.233 (6)	260.035
7	Kim Han-sol	15.283		14.166	15.400			260.035
7	Lee Jun-ho	13.433			14.766			260.035
7	Lee Sang-wook		13.200			14.866	14.333	260.035
7	Park Min-soo		14.200	14.066		13.533	14.600	260.035
7	Shin Dong-hyen	14.366	14.666		14.833			260.035
7	Yoo Won-chul			14.591		15.433	14.300	260.035
8	Brazil	44.666 (3)	39.432 (8)	44.699 (3)	44.316 (7)	42.932 (8)	43.532 (5)	259.577
8	Francisco Barretto		11.100			14.966	13.700	259.577
8	Lucas Bitencourt		13.866	14.400		14.600	14.666	259.577
8	Diego Hypólito	15.233			14.716			259.577
8	Arthur Mariano	14.733	14.466		14.700		15.166	259.577
8	Caio Souza	14.700		14.766	14.900	13.366		259.577
8	Arthur Zanetti			15.533				259.577

=== Individual all-around ===
Oldest and youngest competitors

	Name	Country	Date of birth	Age
Youngest	Kazuma Kaya	Japan	19 November 1996	18 years, 11 months and 11 days
Oldest	Andrey Likhovitskiy	Belarus	23 June 1986	29 years, 4 months and 7 days

Rank	Gymnast	Floor (gymnastics)	Pommel horse	Rings (gymnastics)	Vault (gymnastics)	Parallel bars	Horizontal bar	Total
1st place, gold medalist(s)	Kōhei Uchimura (JPN)	15.733	15.100	14.933	15.633	15.833	15.100	92.332
2nd place, silver medalist(s)	Manrique Larduet (CUB)	14.666	14.300	15.233	15.433	15.733	15.333	90.698
3rd place, bronze medalist(s)	Deng Shudi (CHN)	15.133	14.400	14.533	15.300	15.933	14.800	90.099
4	Oleg Verniaiev (UKR)	14.975	13.566	15.233	15.300	16.000	14.566	89.640
5	Max Whitlock (GBR)	15.700	16.100	14.516	15.000	15.100	12.833	89.249
6	Nikolai Kuksenkov (RUS)	14.666	14.933	14.800	14.866	15.033	14.900	89.198
7	Daniel Purvis (GBR)	15.166	14.666	14.466	14.900	15.400	14.466	89.064
8	Donnell Whittenburg (USA)	15.266	14.166	15.533	14.533	15.633	13.666	88.797
9	Xiao Ruoteng (CHN)	14.866	14.033	14.266	15.166	14.733	15.166	88.230
10	Kazuma Kaya (JPN)	14.666	15.400	14.033	14.700	14.933	14.466	88.198
11	David Belyavskiy (RUS)	14.700	14.700	14.766	14.033	15.366	14.466	88.031
12	Arthur Mariano (BRA)	15.000	14.500	14.000	14.466	14.800	15.200	87.966
13	Pablo Brägger (SUI)	14.866	13.833	13.800	14.800	15.300	15.200	87.799
14	Bart Deurloo (NED)	15.200	14.666	14.166	14.700	13.466	14.966	87.164
15	Christian Baumann (SUI)	14.200	14.433	14.066	14.416	15.000	14.400	86.515
16	Andrey Likhovitskiy (BLR)	14.066	14.766	13.900	14.100	14.700	14.466	85.998
17	Danell Leyva (USA)	13.733	12.933	14.233	14.300	15.366	14.000	84.565
18	Park Min-soo (KOR)	13.975	14.566	13.766	14.033	14.966	13.033	84.339
19	Rubén López (ESP)	14.266	12.333	14.133	14.666	14.166	14.533	84.097
20	Lucas Bitencourt (BRA)	12.966	14.066	14.200	14.733	13.566	14.300	83.831
21	Cristian Bățagă (ROU)	14.500	13.366	14.166	14.558	13.966	13.033	83.589
22	Jim Zona (FRA)	14.733	13.466	12.866	14.433	14.166	13.633	83.297
23	Axel Augis (FRA)	14.233	14.200	14.166	14.866	13.533	11.266	82.264
	Florian Landuyt (BEL)	4.591			14.733	11.866	13.933	45.123

=== Floor ===
Oldest and youngest competitors

	Name	Country	Date of birth	Age
Youngest	Kenzo Shirai	Japan	24 August 1996	19 years, 2 months and 8 days
Oldest	Tomás González	Chile	22 November 1985	29 years, 11 months and 10 days

Position	Gymnast	D Score	E Score	Penalty	Total
1st place, gold medalist(s)	Kenzo Shirai (JPN)	7.600	8.633		16.233
2nd place, silver medalist(s)	Max Whitlock (GBR)	6.800	8.766		15.566
3rd place, bronze medalist(s)	Rayderley Zapata (ESP)	6.700	8.500		15.200
4	Deng Shudi (CHN)	6.700	8.466		15.166
5	Daniel Purvis (GBR)	6.500	8.600		15.100
6	Kim Han-sol (KOR)	6.800	8.133		14.933
7	Manrique Larduet (CUB)	6.800	8.000		14.800
8	Tomás González (CHI)	6.800	8.033	−0.100	14.733

=== Pommel horse ===
Oldest and youngest competitors

	Name	Country	Date of birth	Age
Youngest	Kazuma Kaya	Japan	19 November 1996	18 years
Oldest	Harutyun Merdinyan	Armenia	16 August 1984	31 years

Position	Gymnast	D Score	E Score	Penalty	Total
1st place, gold medalist(s)	Max Whitlock (GBR)	7.300	8.833		16.133
2nd place, silver medalist(s)	Louis Smith (GBR)	7.200	8.833		16.033
3rd place, bronze medalist(s)	Harutyun Merdinyan (ARM)	6.700	8.800		15.500
3rd place, bronze medalist(s)	Kazuma Kaya (JPN)	6.800	8.700		15.500
5	Vid Hidvégi (HUN)	6.600	8.766		15.366
6	Oleg Verniaiev (UKR)	7.000	8.266		15.266
7	Alexander Naddour (USA)	6.700	8.500		15.200
8	Robert Seligman (CRO)	6.400	8.033		14.433

=== Rings ===
Oldest and youngest competitors

	Name	Country	Date of birth	Age
Youngest	Donnell Whittenburg	United States	18 August 1994	21 years
Oldest	Yuri van Gelder	Netherlands	20 April 1983	32 years

Position	Gymnast	D Score	E Score	Penalty	Total
1st place, gold medalist(s)	Eleftherios Petrounias (GRE)	6.800	9.000		15.800
2nd place, silver medalist(s)	You Hao (CHN)	7.000	8.733		15.733
3rd place, bronze medalist(s)	Liu Yang (CHN)	6.900	8.800		15.700
4	Samir Aït Saïd (FRA)	6.800	8.833		15.633
5	Brandon Wynn (USA)	6.800	8.800		15.600
6	Yuri van Gelder (NED)	6.800	8.700		15.500
7	Vahagn Davtyan (ARM)	6.600	8.733		15.333
8	Donnell Whittenburg (USA)	6.700	8.600		15.300

=== Vault ===
Oldest and youngest competitors

	Name	Country	Date of birth	Age
Youngest	Kenzo Shirai	Japan	24 August 1996	19 years
Oldest	Marian Drăgulescu	Romania	18 December 1980	34 years

Position	Gymnast	Vault 1				Vault 2				Total
Position	Gymnast	D Score	E Score	Pen.	Score 1	D Score	E Score	Pen.	Score 2	Total
1st place, gold medalist(s)	Ri Se-gwang (PRK)	6.400	9.200		15.600	6.400	8.900		15.300	15.450
2nd place, silver medalist(s)	Marian Drăgulescu (ROU)	6.000	9.300		15.300	6.200	9.300		15.500	15.400
3rd place, bronze medalist(s)	Donnell Whittenburg (USA)	6.000	9.100		15.100	6.400	9.200		15.600	15.350
4	Oleg Verniaiev (UKR)	6.000	9.466		15.466	6.000	9.100		15.100	15.283
5	Ihor Radivilov (UKR)	6.000	9.200		15.200	6.000	8.966		14.966	15.083
6	Denis Ablyazin (RUS)	6.400	8.000	−0.100	14.300	6.200	9.200		15.400	14.850
7	Kenzo Shirai (JPN)	5.600	8.900		14.500	5.200	9.333		14.533	14.516
8	Kim Han-sol (KOR)	6.000	8.000		14.000	6.000	9.000		15.000	14.500

=== Parallel bars ===
Oldest and youngest competitors

	Name	Country	Date of birth	Age
Youngest	Manrique Larduet	Cuba	10 July 1996	19 years
Oldest	Yusuke Tanaka	Japan	29 November 1989	25 years

Position	Gymnast	D Score	E Score	Penalty	Total
1st place, gold medalist(s)	You Hao (CHN)	7.300	8.916		16.216
2nd place, silver medalist(s)	Oleg Verniaiev (UKR)	7.100	8.966		16.066
3rd place, bronze medalist(s)	Oleg Stepko (AZE)	7.000	8.966		15.966
3rd place, bronze medalist(s)	Deng Shudi (CHN)	7.100	8.866		15.966
5	Manrique Larduet (CUB)	6.900	8.833		15.733
6	Danell Leyva (USA)	6.900	8.766		15.666
7	Yusuke Tanaka (JPN)	6.600	9.000		15.600
8	Nile Wilson (GBR)	6.600	8.633		15.233

=== Horizontal bar ===
Oldest and youngest competitors

	Name	Country	Date of birth	Age
Youngest	Manrique Larduet	Cuba	10 July 1996	19 years
Oldest	Chris Brooks	United States	19 December 1986	28 years

Manrique Larduet was qualified for the Olympics, as an individual, by medaling on this event.

Position	Gymnast	D Score	E Score	Penalty	Total
1st place, gold medalist(s)	Kōhei Uchimura (JPN)	7.100	8.733		15.833
2nd place, silver medalist(s)	Danell Leyva (USA)	7.300	8.400		15.700
3rd place, bronze medalist(s)	Manrique Larduet (CUB)	7.000	8.600		15.600
4	Arthur Mariano (BRA)	6.500	8.666		15.166
5	Andreas Bretschneider (GER)	7.200	7.766		14.966
6	Chris Brooks (USA)	6.400	7.400		13.800
7	Fabian Hambüchen (GER)	7.200	6.300		13.500
7	Oliver Hegi (SUI)	6.000	7.500		13.500

== Women's results ==
=== Team competition ===
Oldest and youngest competitors

	Name	Country	Date of birth	Age
Youngest	Sydney Townsend	Canada	24 December 1999	15 years
Oldest	Ksenia Afanasyeva	Russia	13 September 1991	24 years

Rank	Team	Vault (gymnastics)	Uneven bars	Balance beam	Floor (gymnastics)	Total
1st place, gold medalist(s)	United States	46.665 (1)	45.433 (2)	43.432 (1)	45.808 (1)	181.338
1st place, gold medalist(s)	Maggie Nichols	15.466	14.800	13.966	15.000	181.338
1st place, gold medalist(s)	Simone Biles	15.966		15.200	15.733	181.338
1st place, gold medalist(s)	Gabby Douglas	15.233	15.333			181.338
1st place, gold medalist(s)	Aly Raisman			14.266	15.075	181.338
1st place, gold medalist(s)	Madison Kocian		15.300			181.338
1st place, gold medalist(s)	Brenna Dowell					181.338
2nd place, silver medalist(s)	China	45.233 (3)	45.632 (1)	42.300 (2)	42.999 (3)	176.164
2nd place, silver medalist(s)	Shang Chunsong		15.233	14.600	14.366	176.164
2nd place, silver medalist(s)	Wang Yan	15.200		13.300	14.633	176.164
2nd place, silver medalist(s)	Tan Jiaxin	15.200	15.133			176.164
2nd place, silver medalist(s)	Fan Yilin		15.266	14.400		176.164
2nd place, silver medalist(s)	Mao Yi	14.833			14.000	176.164
2nd place, silver medalist(s)	Chen Siyi					176.164
3rd place, bronze medalist(s)	Great Britain	45.049 (4)	42.299 (5)	41.733 (3)	43.299 (2)	172.380
3rd place, bronze medalist(s)	Ellie Downie	15.133	13.033	14.133	14.133	172.380
3rd place, bronze medalist(s)	Claudia Fragapane	14.833		13.800	14.733	172.380
3rd place, bronze medalist(s)	Amy Tinkler	15.083			14.433	172.380
3rd place, bronze medalist(s)	Becky Downie		14.833	13.800		172.380
3rd place, bronze medalist(s)	Ruby Harrold		14.433			172.380
3rd place, bronze medalist(s)	Kelly Simm					172.380
4	Russia	45.766 (2)	43.874 (3)	40.133 (6)	42.191 (6)	171.964
4	Maria Paseka	15.600	14.733		13.766	171.964
4	Viktoria Komova	15.100	14.000	13.300		171.964
4	Ksenia Afanasyeva	15.066			14.500	171.964
4	Seda Tutkhalyan			13.300	13.925	171.964
4	Daria Spiridonova		15.141			171.964
4	Maria Kharenkova			13.533		171.964
5	Japan	44.832 (5)	42.424 (4)	40.066 (7)	42.565 (5)	169.887
5	Asuka Teramoto	14.600	14.225	13.900	13.966	169.887
5	Mai Murakami	15.066	13.966	12.200	13.966	169.887
5	Sae Miyakawa	15.166			14.633	169.887
5	Aiko Sugihara		14.233			169.887
5	Sakura Yumoto			13.966		169.887
5	Natsumi Sasada					169.887
6	Canada	44.533 (6)	40.666 (7)	41.032 (5)	41.466 (7)	167.697
6	Ellie Black	15.100		13.566	14.233	167.697
6	Brittany Rogers	15.000	13.200	13.700		167.697
6	Isabela Onyshko		13.933	13.766	13.900	167.697
6	Sydney Townsend	14.433				167.697
6	Victoria-Kayen Woo		13.533			167.697
6	Audrey Rousseau				13.333	167.697
7	Italy	43.699 (7)	41.766 (6)	39.399 (8)	42.733 (4)	167.597
7	Carlotta Ferlito	14.466		14.300	14.033	167.597
7	Erika Fasana	14.800			14.500	167.597
7	Elisa Meneghini	14.433			14.200	167.597
7	Enus Mariani		14.166	12.566		167.597
7	Lara Mori		13.800	12.533		167.597
7	Tea Ugrin		13.800			167.597
8	Netherlands	41.599 (8)	38.432 (8)	41.500 (4)	41.199 (8)	162.730
8	Eythora Thorsdottir		13.066	13.800	13.400	162.730
8	Lieke Wevers		11.133	14.200	13.866	162.730
8	Tisha Volleman	14.100			13.933	162.730
8	Sanne Wevers		14.233	13.500		162.730
8	Mara Titarsolej	14.066				162.730
8	Lisa Top	13.433				162.730

=== Individual all-around ===
Oldest and youngest competitors

	Name	Country	Date of birth	Age
Youngest	Wang Yan	China	30 October 1999	15 years
Oldest	Lieke Wevers	Netherlands	17 September 1991	24 years

Rank	Gymnast	Vault (gymnastics)	Uneven bars	Balance beam	Floor (gymnastics)	Total
1st place, gold medalist(s)	Simone Biles (USA)	15.833	14.900	14.400	15.266	60.399
2nd place, silver medalist(s)	Gabby Douglas (USA)	15.300	15.033	14.400	14.583	59.316
3rd place, bronze medalist(s)	Larisa Iordache (ROU)	15.066	14.800	14.766	14.475	59.107
4	Shang Chunsong (CHN)	13.866	15.166	14.700	14.533	58.265
5	Giulia Steingruber (SUI)	15.600	13.900	13.333	14.500	57.333
6	Mai Murakami (JPN)	14.966	13.800	14.033	14.333	57.132
7	Ellie Black (CAN)	15.033	14.000	13.300	14.425	56.758
8	Laura Jurca (ROU)	15.133	13.733	13.966	13.900	56.732
9	Asuka Teramoto (JPN)	15.166	14.366	13.233	13.366	56.131
10	Elisabeth Seitz (GER)	14.133	15.233	13.433	12.966	55.765
11	Wang Yan (CHN)	14.875	13.566	13.800	13.500	55.741
12	Carlotta Ferlito (ITA)	14.066	13.600	14.441	13.633	55.740
13	Lieke Wevers (NED)	13.733	14.333	14.200	13.366	55.632
14	Tea Ugrin (ITA)	14.066	14.000	13.766	13.733	55.565
15	Seda Tutkhalyan (RUS)	14.866	14.300	12.700	13.566	55.432
16	Isabela Onyshko (CAN)	14.233	14.400	13.066	13.633	55.332
17	Lisa Verschueren (BEL)	14.133	13.900	13.600	13.666	55.299
18	Lorrane Oliveira (BRA)	15.166	13.733	12.966	13.166	55.031
19	Pauline Schäfer (GER)	14.633	13.433	13.133	13.766	54.965
19	Rune Hermans (BEL)	14.033	13.466	13.866	13.600	54.965
21	Noémi Makra (HUN)	13.933	14.266	12.833	13.833	54.865
22	Ruby Harrold (GBR)	14.633	14.533	12.433	13.100	54.699
23	Amy Tinkler (GBR)	14.866	13.033	12.233	13.966	54.098
24	Flávia Saraiva (BRA)	14.233	13.700	12.266	13.033	53.232

=== Vault ===
Medaling on the event allowed North Korea's Hong Un-jong to qualify to the Olympics as an individual.

Oldest and youngest competitors

	Name	Country	Date of birth	Age
Youngest	Wang Yan	China	30 October 1999	16 years
Oldest	Hong Un-jong	North Korea	9 March 1989	26 years

Position	Gymnast	Vault 1				Vault 2				Total
Position	Gymnast	D Score	E Score	Pen.	Score 1	D Score	E Score	Pen.	Score 2	Total
1st place, gold medalist(s)	Maria Paseka (RUS)	6.400	9.233		15.633	6.300	9.400		15.700	15.666
2nd place, silver medalist(s)	Hong Un-jong (PRK)	6.300	9.366		15.666	6.400	9.200		15.600	15.633
3rd place, bronze medalist(s)	Simone Biles (USA)	6.300	9.600		15.900	5.600	9.583		15.183	15.541
4	Ellie Downie (GBR)	5.800	9.166		14.966	5.600	9.233		14.833	14.899
5	Dipa Karmakar (IND)	7.000	8.300		15.300	6.000	8.366	−0.300	14.066	14.683
6	Wang Yan (CHN)	6.000	9.066		15.066	6.200	7.900		14.100	14.583
7	Giulia Steingruber (SUI)	6.200	9.400	−0.100	15.500	5.300	8.333		13.633	14.566
7	Alexa Moreno (MEX)	6.200	8.566	−0.100	14.666	6.000	8.566	−0.100	14.466	14.566

=== Uneven bars ===
This was the first four-way tie in history for gold at a World Artistic Gymnastics Championships, but this is unlikely to happen again because the World Championships has instituted a tie-breaking procedure since then similar to the Olympics to prevent a situation like this from happening again.

Oldest and youngest competitors

	Name	Country	Date of birth	Age
Youngest	Fan Yilin	China	11 November 1999	15 years
Oldest	Viktoria Komova	Russia	30 January 1995	20 years

Position	Gymnast	D Score	E Score	Penalty	Total
1st place, gold medalist(s)	Fan Yilin (CHN)	6.900	8.466		15.366
1st place, gold medalist(s)	Viktoria Komova (RUS)	6.600	8.766		15.366
1st place, gold medalist(s)	Daria Spiridonova (RUS)	6.700	8.666		15.366
1st place, gold medalist(s)	Madison Kocian (USA)	6.600	8.766		15.366
5	Gabby Douglas (USA)	6.400	8.733		15.133
6	Shang Chunsong (CHN)	6.700	8.200		14.900
7	Ruby Harrold (GBR)	6.300	8.466		14.766
8	Sophie Scheder (GER)	6.600	8.000		14.600

=== Balance beam ===
Simone Biles of the USA defended her beam title from 2014, becoming the first back-to-back world champion on beam. With her ninth career world championships gold medal, she tied the record held by Larisa Latynina, Gina Gogean, and Svetlana Khorkina. Sanne Wevers of the Netherlands and Pauline Schäfer of Germany won the first medals for their countries on the balance beam. Schäfer also qualified as an individual to the Olympics by medaling (she had not directly qualified as Germany failed to make the team final, but made the Test Event).

Oldest and youngest competitors

	Name	Country	Date of birth	Age
Youngest	Wang Yan	China	30 October 1999	16 years
Oldest	Sanne Wevers	Netherlands	17 September 1991	24 years

Position	Gymnast	D Score	E Score	Penalty	Total
1st place, gold medalist(s)	Simone Biles (USA)	6.400	8.958		15.358
2nd place, silver medalist(s)	Sanne Wevers (NED)	5.700	8.633		14.333
3rd place, bronze medalist(s)	Pauline Schäfer (GER)	5.800	8.333		14.133
4	Viktoria Komova (RUS)	5.700	8.233		13.933
5	Wang Yan (CHN)	6.400	7.233		13.633
6	Seda Tutkhalyan (RUS)	6.000	7.500		13.500
7	Ellie Black (CAN)	6.000	7.466		13.466
8	Eythora Thorsdottir (NED)	5.700	7.033		12.733

=== Floor ===
Due to an elbow injury prior to the final, Erika Fasana withdrew from the final, being replaced by Shang Chunsong. Additionally, Swiss gymnast Giulia Steingruber sustained a knee injury during the vault final the day before, rendering her unable to participate in the floor final. She was replaced by Lieke Wevers of the Netherlands. Simone Biles won a record 10th career world championships gold medal.

Oldest and youngest competitors

	Name	Country	Date of birth	Age
Youngest	Sae Miyakawa	Japan	10 September 1999	16 years
Oldest	Ksenia Afanasyeva	Russia	13 September 1991	24 years

Position	Gymnast	D Score	E Score	Penalty	Total
1st place, gold medalist(s)	Simone Biles (USA)	6.800	9.000		15.800
2nd place, silver medalist(s)	Ksenia Afanasyeva (RUS)	6.400	8.700		15.100
3rd place, bronze medalist(s)	Maggie Nichols (USA)	6.200	8.800		15.000
4	Shang Chunsong (CHN)	6.400	8.533		14.933
4	Sae Miyakawa (JPN)	6.300	8.633		14.933
6	Ellie Downie (GBR)	6.000	8.733		14.733
7	Claudia Fragapane (GBR)	6.200	8.366	−0.100	14.466
8	Lieke Wevers (NED)	5.400	8.700		14.100
