= Yao Jinnan =

Chinese artistic gymnast

- 姚金男
- Full name: Yao Jinnan
- Born: February 8, 1995 (age 31) Fuzhou, Fujian, China
- Height: 145 cm (4 ft 9 in)

Gymnastics career
- Discipline: Women's artistic gymnastics
- Country represented: China; (2011–16 (CHN))
- Head coach: 王群策 (Wang Qunce)、徐惊雷 (Xu Jinglei)
- Music: 2010-2011 - West Side Story 2012-2013 - A for Angel; 2014 Chinese Nationals - Sphynx 2014 Worlds - The Question of U by Prince
Medal record
Representing China
World Championships
Gold medal – first place	2014 Nanning	Uneven Bars
Silver medal – second place	2011 Tokyo	Balance Beam
Silver medal – second place	2014 Nanning	Team
Bronze medal – third place	2011 Tokyo	Team
Bronze medal – third place	2011 Tokyo	All-Around
Asian Games
Gold medal – first place	2014 Incheon	Team
Gold medal – first place	2014 Incheon	All-Around
Gold medal – first place	2014 Incheon	Uneven Bars
Gold medal – first place	2014 Incheon	Floor Exercise
National Games
Gold medal – first place	2013 Liaoning	All-Around
Silver medal – second place	2013 Liaoning	Uneven Bars
- Awards: Longines Prize for Elegance

Yao Jinnan (born February 8, 1995) is a retired artistic gymnast who represented China at the 2012 Summer Olympics. She is the 2014 world champion on the uneven bars, and the 2011 world all-around bronze medalist and balance beam silver medalist.

Yao is one of only a handful of gymnasts, all Chinese, to successfully perform the "Mo salto" on uneven bars.

== Gymnastics career ==
=== 2011 ===
Yao made her international debut at a World Cup event in Cottbus, Germany, where she won gold medals on the uneven bars, balance beam and floor exercise. She then won gold on floor and bronze on bars at the Doha World Cup.

At the 2011 Chinese National Championships, Yao received silver medals in the all-around and on uneven bars, and bronze on floor exercise. At the Japan Cup, she won the bronze medal in the all-around and gold in the team event with teammates Yang Yilin, Sui Lu and Huang Qiushuang.

Yao was named to the Chinese women's team for the 2011 World Artistic Gymnastics Championships and performed well in the preliminary round, qualifying to the all-around, beam and floor finals. In the team final, she contributed high scores on every apparatus to help China win the bronze medal. In the all-around, she fell off the beam and placed third, behind fellow first-year seniors Jordyn Wieber of the United States and Viktoria Komova of Russia. Had she not fallen, she would have become the first world all-around champion from China.

In the balance beam event final, she won the silver medal behind Sui. In the floor final, she placed fourth, 0.134 points behind bronze medalist Aly Raisman of the United States.

=== 2012 ===
At the Olympic Test Event in London in January, Yao competed on uneven bars and balance beam, finishing third and fifth, respectively. She made some mistakes in the bars final but still managed to take the bronze medal behind Russia's Anastasia Grishina and France's Youna Dufournet. In the balance beam final, she fell and finished in sixth place.

At the Zibo World Cup in May 2012, Yao won gold medals on uneven bars and balance beam, ahead of her teammate Huang Qiushuang, who won the silver on both events. She was scheduled to compete at the Chinese National Championships later that month, but had to withdraw after injuring her knee in podium training. She was nonetheless named to the Chinese women's gymnastics team for the 2012 Olympic Games in London, along with Huang, Sui, Deng Linlin and He Kexin.

==== Olympic Games ====
Due to a thigh injury, Yao was not at full strength at the Olympics, but she still competed on all four events in the qualifications round. She fell on three of the four: beam, where she scored 12.833 (51st place); floor, where she scored 13.066 (54th place), and vault, where she scored 13.133. On uneven bars, however, she posted a 15.766 and qualified in fourth place to the event final. She finished 22nd overall but did not qualify to the all-around final because of the two-per-country rule (Deng and Huang placed ahead of her).

In the team final, Yao scored 15.533 on bars and 14.333 for her double-twisting Yurchenko vault. China placed fourth, failing to defend its title from the 2008 Olympics. In the uneven bars final, Yao performed a nearly perfect routine with a stuck double-layout dismount. She was awarded a 15.766 and finished in fourth place, 0.15 behind bronze medalist Beth Tweddle of Great Britain.

=== 2013 ===
In September, Yao competed at the Chinese National Games and tied for gold in the all-around with Shang Chunsong. She was selected to compete at the 2013 World Championships along with Shang, Zeng Siqi and Huang Huidan.

At the World Championships, Yao qualified for the all-around and uneven bars finals. In the all-around, she performed the Mo salto on bars, an element that had not been done by a woman in World or Olympic competition since 1996, when Mo Huilan (who debuted the skill in 1994) and Bi Wenjing performed it. With this routine, she earned the highest uneven bars score of the day. Later, she fell on beam and finished outside of the medals, in fifth place. In the uneven bars finals, she attempted the Mo salto again, but fell and did not medal.

=== 2014 ===
In May, Yao successfully defended her all-around title at the Chinese National Championships and also won gold on the uneven bars.

In the fall, she competed at the Asian Games in Incheon, where she won gold with the team, in the all-around, and on floor exercise and uneven bars. She was selected to compete at the 2014 World Championships in Nanning, where she won the team silver with Huang, Shang, Tan Jiaxin, Bai Yawen and Chen Siyi. Individually, she finished fifth in the all-around, where Simone Biles of the United States won gold; first in the uneven bars final, her first gold medal at a World Championships, with a score of 15.633; and eighth in the balance beam finals. She was awarded the Longines Prize for Elegance and received a trophy, a Longines watch and US$5,000.

=== 2015 ===
In January, it was announced that Yao would take the year off due to a shoulder injury that required surgery. She traveled to the United States for the operation.

=== 2016 ===
Yao competed in the Chinese Nationals in May but failed to medal due to her shoulder injury. She was left out of the Olympic squad for the 2016 Summer Olympics. Yao retired from artistic gymnastics due to a shoulder injury.

== Personal life ==
Yao has a twin sister who started gymnastics training with her but did not continue to the elite level. There has been some investigation into her actual birthdate, which may have been altered to allow her to compete in competitions she would not have been age-eligible for.

== Competitive history ==
Year	Event	Team	AA	VT	UB	BB	FX
2010	National Championships		4th		4th	7th	6th
2011	Cottbus World Cup				1st	1st	1st
2011	Doha World Cup				1st	4th	1st
2011	National Championships		2nd		2nd		3rd
2011	Japan Cup	1st	3rd				
2011	World Championships	3rd	3rd			2nd	4th
2012	Zibo World Cup				1st	1st	
2012	Olympic Games	4th			4th		
2013	National Championships	7th	1st		3rd	5th	3rd
2013	National Games	6th	1st		2nd		7th
2013	World Championships		5th		6th		
2013	Stuttgart World Cup	1st					
2014	National Championships	5th	1st		1st	7th	2nd
2014	Asian Games	1st	1st		1st		1st
2014	World Championships	2nd	5th		1st	8th	
