= Tan Jiaxin =

Chinese artistic gymnast

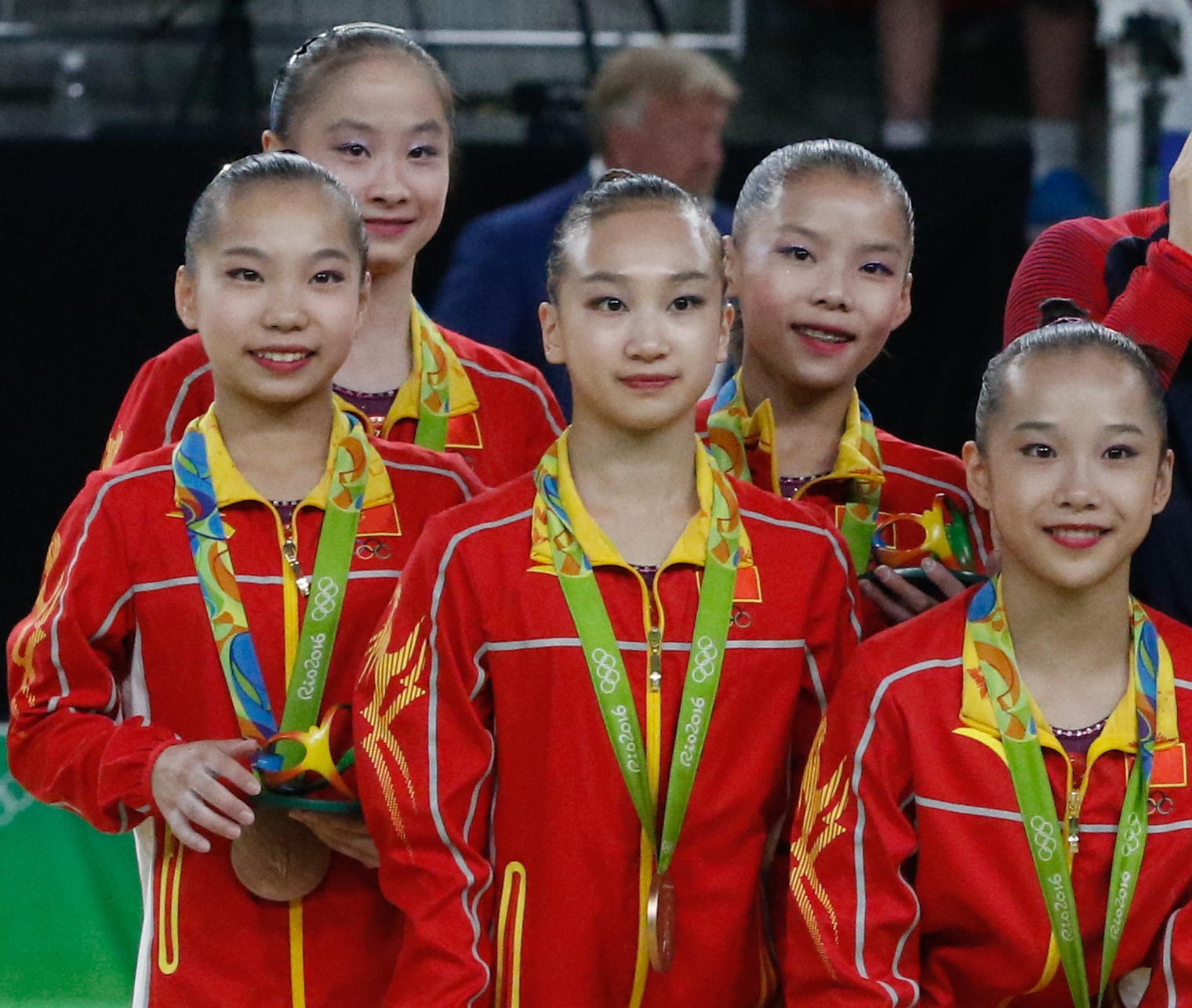
- Full name: 譚佳薪 (Tan Jiaxin)
- Born: 3 December 1996 (age 29)

Gymnastics career
- Discipline: Women's artistic gymnastics
- Country represented: China
- Head coaches: Xiong Jingbin (熊景斌), Zhang Xia(张霞)
- Retired: September 2017
Medal record
Representing China
Olympic Games
Bronze medal – third place	2016 Rio de Janeiro	Team
World Championships
Silver medal – second place	2014 Nanning	Team
Silver medal – second place	2015 Glasgow	Team
Asian Games
Gold medal – first place	2014 Incheon	Team
Asian Championships
Gold medal – first place	2017 Bangkok	Team
East Asian Games
Gold medal – first place	2013 Tianjin	Team
Gold medal – first place	2013 Tianjin	Uneven Bars
Silver medal – second place	2013 Tianjin	Vault

Tan Jiaxin (simplified Chinese: 谭佳薪; traditional Chinese: 譚佳薪; pinyin: Tán Jiāxīn; born December 3, 1996, in Changsha) is an elite Chinese gymnast.

== Career ==
=== 2012 ===
Although she did not make the 2012 Summer Olympics in London, Tan has continued to compete and become a strong player for China. Later in 2012, she competed at the Chinese Individual Nationals in the fall, winning silver on uneven bars.

=== 2013 ===
In 2013, she won gold on uneven bars at the Doha World Cup. She won team bronze medals at the Chinese Nationals and Chinese National Games, and also placed sixth on vault in the latter competition. She was named to the Chinese team for the East Asian Games, where she won gold with her team and on uneven bars, and silver on vault.

In November, she was named to the Chinese team for the Stuttgart World Cup, where she won the gold medal in the Team Challenge

=== 2014 ===
Tan did not compete at Chinese Nationals in May.

Tan was named to the team selected to compete at both the Asian Games in Incheon and World Championships in Nanning. Alongside teammates Yao Jinnan, Shang Chunsong, Huang Huidan, Chen Siyi, and Bai Yawen, the Chinese team won gold in Incheon ahead of the North Korean and Japanese teams and silver in Nanning behind the United States and ahead of Russia. Individually at Worlds, Tan placed third in the uneven bars qualifications with a score of 15.333 points but was unable to compete in the final due to the two-per-country rule; teammates Yao and Huang placed ahead of her in first and second place, respectively.

=== 2015 ===
Tan participated in the World Championships in Glasgow. Again, the Chinese team won a silver medal behind the United States, and this time ahead of Great Britain. Tan contributed one of the highest scores in vault (tied with Wang Yan) of the Chinese team and 15.133 in the uneven bars behind Fan Yilin and Shang Chunsong during the team final.

=== 2016 ===
At age 19, Tan won gold medal with her team at the Chinese Nationals, and also won silver medal on the uneven bars. Tan was initially named as an alternate to China's 2016 Olympics team, but after teammate Liu Tingting suffered an injury and pulled out, she was named to the 2016 Olympic team.

== Competitive history ==
Year	Event	Team	AA	VT	UB	BB	FX
2012	National Championships	3rd			3rd		
2013	Doha World Cup				1st		
2013	National Championships	3rd					
2013	National Games	3rd		6th			
2013	East Asian Games	1st		2nd	1st		
2013	Stuttgart World Cup	1st					
2014	Asian Games	1st					
2014	World Championships	2nd					
2015	National Championships	1st			5th		
2015	World Championships	2nd					
2016	National Championships	1st			2nd		
2016	Olympic Games	3rd					
