= Chen Siyi =

Chinese artistic gymnast

- Full name: 陈思怡 (Chen Siyi)
- Born: 12 February 1998 (age 28) Lianjiang, Fuzhou, China

Gymnastics career
- Discipline: Women's artistic gymnastics
- Country represented: China (2012–15 (CHN))
- Head coaches: Xiong Jingbin(熊景斌), Zhang Xia(张霞)
- Music: 2014 (Worlds & Asian Games) - Moon River
Medal record
Representing China
World Championships
Silver medal – second place	2014 Nanning	Team
Silver medal – second place	2015 Glasgow	Team
Asian Games
Gold medal – first place	2014 Incheon	Team
Asian Championships
Silver medal – second place	2015 Hiroshima	Team

Chen Siyi (Chinese: 陈思怡) is an elite Chinese gymnast. She trains at the National Training Center in Beijing. She's coached by Xiong Jingbin and Zhang Xia, who also coached Deng Linlin and Jiang Yuyuan. Her best events are uneven bars and balance beam.

== Junior career ==
Chen competed in the Junior Nationals in 2010, where she placed tenth on vault.

At the Individual Nationals, she had a sixth-place finish on bars. At the Élite Gym Massilia in the fall, where she made her international debut, she won gold on bars, silver in AA and placed fourth on beam, despite a fall.

In January, she competed at the Australian Olympic Youth Festival with three other Chinese juniors. She won gold with the team and silver on balance beam. In September, she competed at the Chinese National Games, placing sixth with her team and eighteenth in the all-around.

== Senior career ==
=== 2014 ===
Chen was named to the team selected to compete at both the Asian Games in Incheon and World Championships in Nanning. Alongside teammates Yao Jinnan, Shang Chunsong, Huang Huidan, Tan Jiaxin, and Bai Yawen, the Chinese team won gold in Incheon ahead of the North Korean and South Korean teams and silver in Nanning behind the United States and ahead of Russia. In Incheon, Chen placed third in the individual all-around qualifications, placing only 0.100 points behind teammate Shang. However, due to the two-per-country rule, only Yao and Shang were able to compete in the finals. In Nanning, she was less successful due to having a cold throughout much of the competition.

== Competitive history ==
Year	Event	Team	AA	VT	UB	BB	FX
2012	Elite Gym Massilia	4th	2nd		1st	4th	
2013	Australian Youth Olympic Festival	1st	4th			2nd	
2013	National Championships	7th					
2013	National Games	6th	18th				
2014	National Championships	5th	5th		8th		
2014	Asian Games	1st					
2014	World Championships	2nd					
2015	São Paulo World Cup				5th	4th	5th
2015	National Championships	7th	3rd			6th	4th
2015	Asian Championships	2nd	4th				
2015	World Championships	2nd					
