= Shang Chunsong =

Chinese artistic gymnast and traceur

Shāng Chūnsōng
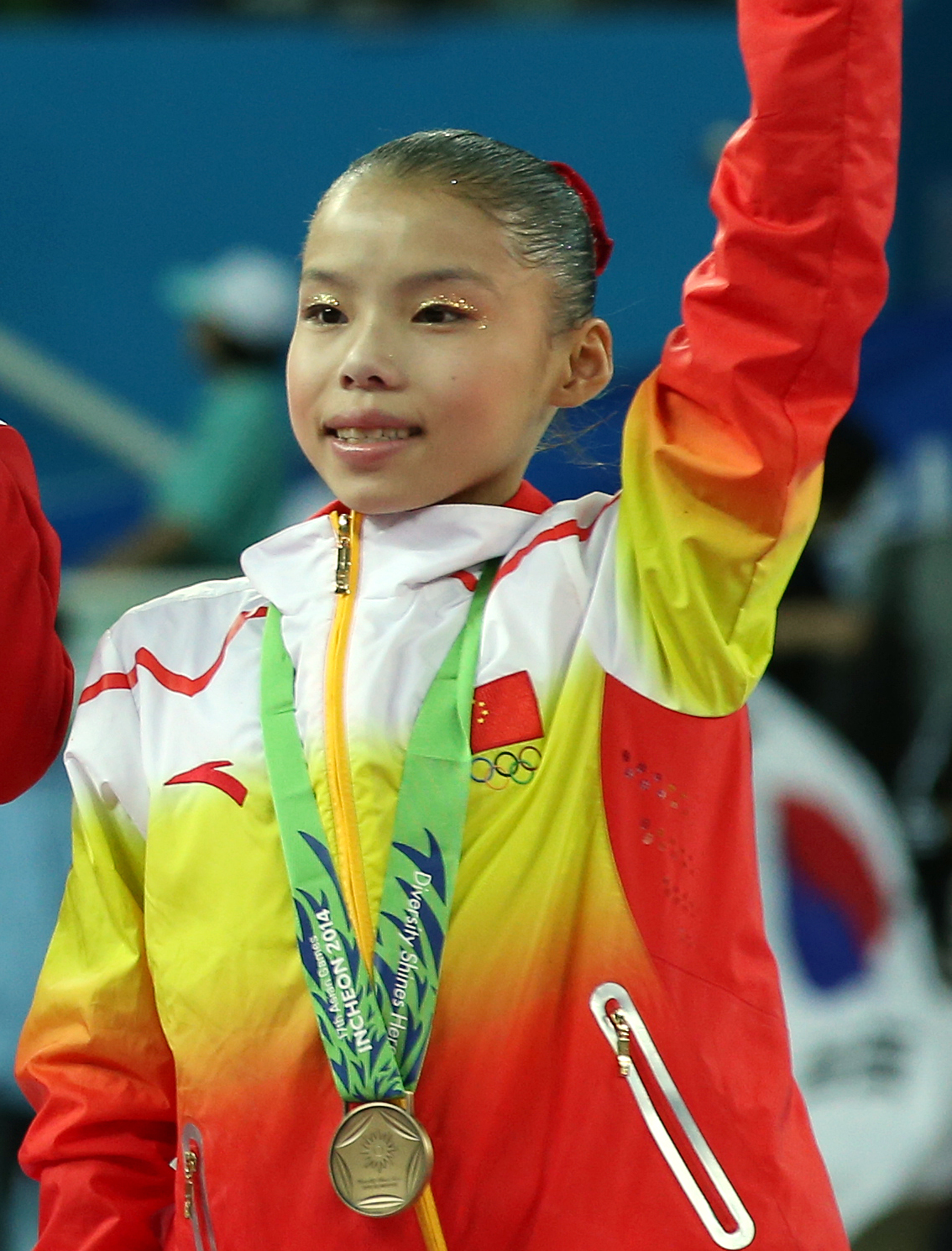
- Shang at the 2014 Asian Games

Personal information
- Full name: 商春松 (Shāng Chūnsōng)
- Born: 18 March 1996 (age 30) Zhangjiajie, Hunan, China
- Height: 142 cm (4 ft 8 in)

Gymnastics career
- Discipline: Women's artistic gymnastics Parkour
- Country represented: China; (2010–2017 (artistic) 2019–present (parkour))
- Club: Hunan Provincial Team
- Head coaches: Xiong Jingbin(熊景斌), Zhang Xia(张霞)
Medal record
Representing China
Women's artistic gymnastics
Olympic Games
Bronze medal – third place	2016 Rio de Janeiro	Team
World Championships
Silver medal – second place	2014 Nanning	Team
Silver medal – second place	2015 Glasgow	Team
Asian Games
Gold medal – first place	2014 Incheon	Team
Silver medal – second place	2014 Incheon	All-around
Silver medal – second place	2014 Incheon	Floor exercise
Bronze medal – third place	2014 Incheon	Balance beam
Asian Championships
Gold medal – first place	2012 Putian	Team
Gold medal – first place	2012 Putian	Balance beam
Gold medal – first place	2012 Putian	Floor exercise
Bronze medal – third place	2012 Putian	All-around
Pacific Rim Championships
Silver medal – second place	2012 Everett	Team
National Games
Gold medal – first place	2013 Liaoning	All-Around
Gold medal – first place	2013 Liaoning	Uneven Bars
Gold medal – first place	2013 Liaoning	Floor Exercise
Bronze medal – third place	2013 Liaoning	Team
Bronze medal – third place	2013 Liaoning	Balance Beam
Parkour
World Championships
Gold medal – first place	2024 Kitakyushu	Freestyle
World Games
Gold medal – first place	2025 Chengdu	Freestyle

Shang Chunsong (Chinese: 商春松; pinyin: Shāng Chūnsōng; born 18 March 1996) is a Chinese artistic gymnast and traceur. Shang was the captain of the bronze medal-winning team at the 2016 Summer Olympics in Rio de Janeiro. Additionally she represented China at the 2013, 2014, and 2015 World Championships where she won silver with the team at the latter two. Domestically she is the 2015 and 2016 Chinese national all-around champion. In Parkour she is the 2024 World and 2025 World Games freestyle champion.

== Personal life ==
Shang was born on 18 March 1996. She grew up in a very poor family, and she was malnourished as a child. Both of Shang's parents are construction workers in Changsha. She has a brother who has a visual impairment, and her biggest hope is to earn enough money to cure her brother's eyesight. She bought a house for her brother in Changsha after winning $163,425 USD from the 2013 Chinese National Games. Her brother, Shang Lei, said, “My sister said it’s for me when I get married. She paid down most of the payment, and I’m working hard as well." When told of his sister's winnings, Shang Lei said, “It doesn't matter how much the prize money is, I just want my sister to smile more.”

== Artistic gymnastics career ==
=== 2012 ===
Shang's senior debut came in 2012. She competed with the Chinese team at the Pacific Rim Championships, winning silver with the team. She also placed fourth on bars and beam, and fifth in the all-around. She was later named to the Chinese team for the Asian Championships. She won gold on balance beam and floor exercise, gold with the Chinese team, and bronze in the all-around.

=== 2013 ===
Shang made her 2013 debut at the Tokyo World Cup, where she placed fourth in the all-around, first on balance beam, and second on floor exercise.

At the 2013 Anadia World Cup, she won a silver medal on balance beam (15.150) and bronze on floor exercise (14.125) and uneven bars (14.175) after a fall on bars.

In September, Shang competed at the Chinese National Games in Dalian and tied for first place in the all-around with Yao Jinnan, ahead of bronze medalist Deng Linlin. She also won the titles on both uneven bars and floor exercise and earned bronze on the balance beam and with the Hunan team (Zeng Siqi, Tan Jiaxin, Xie Yufen, Deng Chunfen and Feng Xiao).

She was selected to compete at the World Championships in Antwerp alongside Yao Jinnan, Zeng Siqi and Huang Huidan. Shang qualified for the all-around final and the balance beam final. In the all-around final she finished eighth after a fall on balance beam. In the balance beam finals she finished sixth with a score of 14.133 points.

She later competed at the Arthur Gander Memorial alongside Zhang Chenglong. She placed sixth in the competition.

Shang competed at the Swiss Cup in November but failed to make it to the semi-finals.

=== 2014 ===
In 2014, at the Chinese Nationals in May, Shang won beam and floor gold, all-around and uneven bars silver, and team bronze.

Later that year, Shang competed at the Asian Games in Incheon with teammates Yao Jinnan, Chen Siyi, Tan Jiaxin, Bai Yawen and Huang Huidan. They won the team gold medal almost 15 points ahead of second-place North Korea. She won silver in the all-around and floor exercise, and bronze on the balance beam.

She was also selected to be a member of the Chinese team at the World Championships in Nanning with the same team that competed at the Asian Games, and they won the silver medal behind the United States team. Individually, Shang qualified for the all-around final and was the second reserve for the floor exercise final. She would have qualified to the balance beam final as well if not for the two-per-country rule; teammates Yao and Bai placed ahead of her in qualifications. She placed 12th in the all-around final after multiple falls on the uneven bars.

=== 2015 ===
Shang began the season at the 2015 São Paulo World Cup. She won gold on the uneven bars with a score of 15.025, and she won gold on the balance beam with a score of 15.400. She then competed at the 2015 Chinese National Championships. She won gold in the team competition representing Hunan. She also won gold in the all-around with a total of 57.100, gold on beam with a score of 14.467, and silver on floor behind Wang Yan with a score of 14.333. Shang was named to the team for the 2015 World Championships along with Chen Siyi, Fan Yilin, Mao Yi, Tan Jiaxin, and Wang Yan. The team won a silver medal behind the United States. Shang finished fourth in the individual all-around with a total of 58.265. She finished sixth in the uneven bars final with a score of 14.900, and she finished fourth in the floor exercise final, tied with Sae Miyakawa, with a score of 14.933.

=== 2016 ===
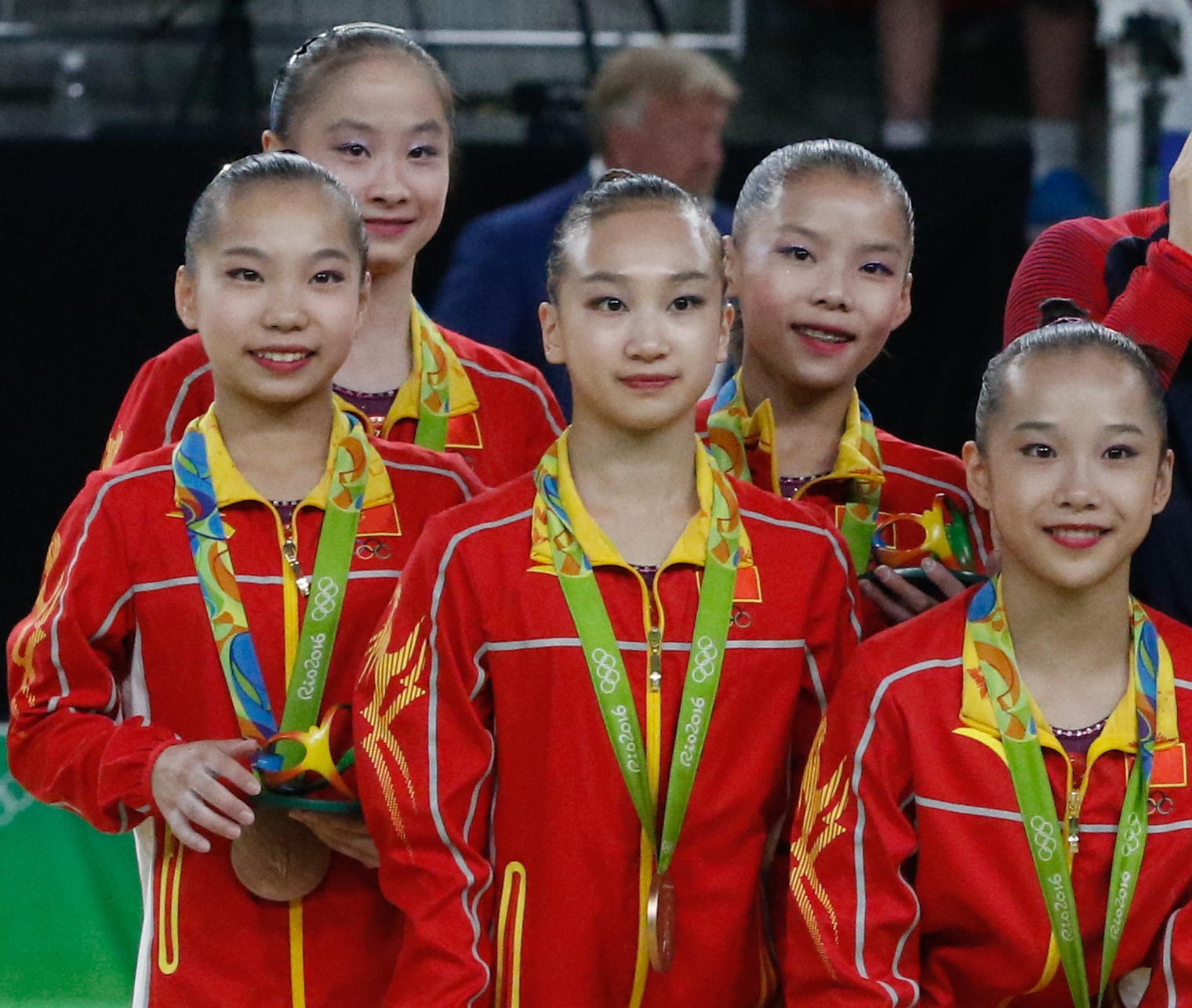
Shang with her Olympic teammates

At the 2016 Chinese National Championships, Shang won gold at the team competition representing Hunan. She then went on to win gold in the all-around competition with a score of 59.550, the balance beam with a score of 15.467, and the floor with a score of 15.100. She placed 4th on the uneven bars with a score of 15.134, just behind Huang Huidan of Zhejiang by only thirty-three-thousandths of a point. Shang was selected for the olympic team for China and was named team captain. At the Summer Olympics in Rio, she helped China bring home a bronze medal in the team competition but fell in her uneven bars routine. She placed 4th in the individual all-around competition, with a score of 58.549 just 0.116 behind bronze medallist Aliya Mustafina. An enquiry into her low balance beam score was rejected during the competition. She placed 5th on the uneven bars event final, just 0.133 away from bronze medalist Sophie Scheder. Shang Chunsong was among the favorites to medal on balance beam and floor exercise, but suffered a fever during the olympics, hindering her performance ability on her first days of competition.

=== 2017 ===
Shang Chunsong started off her season at the 2017 Baku World Cup where she qualified to the uneven bars final. However, she was unable to complete her routine during finals finishing 8th. She then competed at the national championships where she won gold on floor.

After failing to make the national team for the World Championship, Shang announced her retirement from the sport on 5 September.

=== 2019 ===
In 2019 it was announced that she had returned to the sport after a video surfaced of her performing a floor routine at a small domestic meet in March. She was then listed as a participant for the Chinese National Championships, competing for a new province after a coaching change. At the national championships she qualified for finals in the All-around, where she finished off the podium and floor exercise, where she once again won the national title.

== Parkour career ==
Shang discovered parkour while studying at the Central China Normal University. She was intrigued by the sport's "creativity and freedom". In her international debut in parkour, Shang won gold at the 2024 Montpellier World Cup in freestyle, earning China its first gold medal at a Parkour World Cup. The following year Shang won gold at the 2024 Parkour World Championships. At the 2025 World Games Shang won gold, completing her "Grand Slam" in Parkour.

== Eponymous skill ==
Shang has one eponymous skill listed in the Code of Points.

Apparatus	Name	Description	Difficulty (Note: Valid for the 2025-2028 Code of Points)	Added to the Code of Points
Uneven bars	Shang	Clear hip circle on high bar to counter-pike over high bar to hang back on high bar	F	2013 World Championships.

== Competitive history ==
=== Artistic gymnastics ===
Year	Event	Team	AA	VT	UB	BB	FX
2010	National Championships		21				
2012	Pacific Rim Championships	2nd place, silver medalist(s)	5		4	4	
2012	National Championships	3rd place, bronze medalist(s)	3rd place, bronze medalist(s)		8	5	4
2012	Asian Championships	1st place, gold medalist(s)	3rd place, bronze medalist(s)		8	1st place, gold medalist(s)	1st place, gold medalist(s)
2013	Tokyo World Cup		4			1st place, gold medalist(s)	2nd place, silver medalist(s)
2013	National Championships	3rd place, bronze medalist(s)	2nd place, silver medalist(s)		1st place, gold medalist(s)	2nd place, silver medalist(s)	1st place, gold medalist(s)
2013	Anadia World Cup				3rd place, bronze medalist(s)	2nd place, silver medalist(s)	3rd place, bronze medalist(s)
2013	National Games	3rd place, bronze medalist(s)	1st place, gold medalist(s)		1st place, gold medalist(s)	3rd place, bronze medalist(s)	1st place, gold medalist(s)
2013	World Championships		8			6	
2013	Arthur Gander Memorial		6				
2014	National Championships	3rd place, bronze medalist(s)	2nd place, silver medalist(s)		2nd place, silver medalist(s)	1st place, gold medalist(s)	1st place, gold medalist(s)
2014	Asian Games	1st place, gold medalist(s)	2nd place, silver medalist(s)			3rd place, bronze medalist(s)	2nd place, silver medalist(s)
2014	World Championships	2nd place, silver medalist(s)	12				
2015	São Paulo World Cup				1st place, gold medalist(s)	1st place, gold medalist(s)	
2015	National Championships	1st place, gold medalist(s)	1st place, gold medalist(s)			1st place, gold medalist(s)	2nd place, silver medalist(s)
2015	World Championships	2nd place, silver medalist(s)	4		6		4
2016	National Championships	1st place, gold medalist(s)	1st place, gold medalist(s)		4	1st place, gold medalist(s)	1st place, gold medalist(s)
2016	Olympic Games	3rd place, bronze medalist(s)	4		5		
2017	Baku World Cup				8		
2017	National Championships	3rd place, bronze medalist(s)	24			5	1st place, gold medalist(s)
2017	National Games	4	5		4	5	8
2018	National Championships					7	
2019	National Championships	4					1st place, gold medalist(s)
2020	National Championships	4	16				6
2020	National Individual Championships		6				7
2021	National Championships		18				3rd place, bronze medalist(s)
2021	National Games	6					
2023	National Championships	8	17				3rd place, bronze medalist(s)
2023	Chinese Shanti Group Cup						3rd place, bronze medalist(s)

=== Parkour ===
Year	Event	Speed	Freestyle
2023	Chinese Parkour Championships		1st place, gold medalist(s)
2024	Montpellier World Cup		1st place, gold medalist(s)
2024	World Championships		1st place, gold medalist(s)
2025	Amsterdam World Cup		5
2025	World Games		1st place, gold medalist(s)
2026	Montpellier World Cup		1st place, gold medalist(s)
2026	Bejing World Cup		1st place, gold medalist(s)
