= Hong Un-jong =

North Korean artistic gymnast (born 1989)

- Full name: Hong Un-jong
- Born: 9 March 1989 (age 37) Hamgyong Province, North Korea
- Height: 1.55 m (5 ft 1 in)

Gymnastics career
- Discipline: Women's artistic gymnastics
- Country represented: North Korea
- Club: Pyongyang Sports Club
- Head coach: Kim Chun-phil
- Assistant coach: Choe Kyong-hui
- Choreographer: Kim Chun-phil
Medal record
Representing North Korea
Olympic Games
Gold medal – first place	2008 Beijing	Vault
World Championships
Gold medal – first place	2014 Nanning	Vault
Silver medal – second place	2015 Glasgow	Vault
Bronze medal – third place	2013 Antwerp	Vault
Asian Games
Gold medal – first place	2014 Incheon	Vault
Silver medal – second place	2014 Incheon	Team
Bronze medal – third place	2006 Doha	Vault
Summer Universiade
Gold medal – first place	2009 Belgrade	Vault
Gold medal – first place	2013 Kazan	Vault
Bronze medal – third place	2009 Belgrade	Uneven bars
Asian Championships
Gold medal – first place	2006 Surat	Vault
Silver medal – second place	2012 Putian	Vault
Silver medal – second place	2012 Putian	Team
East Asian Games
Gold medal – first place	2013 Tianjin	Vault
Bronze medal – third place	2013 Tianjin	Team

- Hong Un-jong
- Hangul: 홍은정
- Hanja: 洪恩情
- RR: Hong Eunjeong
- MR: Hong Ŭnjŏng

Hong Un-jong (Korean: 홍은정; born 9 March 1989) is a North Korean artistic gymnast. She is the 2008 Olympic champion and 2014 World Champion on vault. She was the first North Korean female gymnast to win a medal at the Olympics.

== Career ==
She was an individual event finalist on the vault at the 2007 World Championships and the bronze medalist on the event at the 2006 Asian Games.

Hong represented North Korea at the 2008 Summer Olympics in Beijing, where she won the gold medal in the women's vault competition. This was the first Olympic medal for a North Korean woman in Olympic gymnastics.

Hong won the gold medal in vault at the 2013 Summer Universiade in Kazan (tied with Russian gymnast Ksenia Afanasyeva) and was the bronze medalist on vault at the 2013 World Championships.

The following year she won the vault final at the World Championships. She performed the two most difficult vaults in the final. In 2015 Hong again represented North Korea at the World Championships held in Glasgow. Though she retained her full difficulties and performed impressively, she failed to defend her title and won a silver medal instead. She was behind Russia's Maria Paseka by 0.033 point. At the 2016 Summer Olympics, she qualified second into vault finals behind Simone Biles. In the finals she performed a solid Cheng to start. For her second vault, she became the first female gymnast to ever attempt a triple twisting Yurchenko vault; however she under-rotated and sat down the vault, getting the vault devalued to an Amanar, and ultimately missed the podium.

== Age controversy ==
Hong Un-jong is the sister of Hong Su-jong, with whom she shares a 9 March birthday. Hong Su-jong had three different birth dates listed for her (1985, 1986, or 1989) at various competitions. At the 2004 Summer Olympics, she competed under the 1985 birth date, but the 1989 birth date would have meant that she was too young to compete. In November 2010, Hong Su-jong was permanently banned from all international competition as a consequence of providing inconsistent age information. North Korea was also banned from all international competition until October 2012 due to this incident, which most significantly included the 2012 Summer Olympics. Hong Un-jong has never been personally implicated in the age falsification, but the consequent country-wide ban meant that she could not defend her Olympic title on vault.

In a video, Hong Un-jong appeared to admit that Hong Su-jong is her twin. If accurate, this would mean that Hong Su-jong was in fact born in 1989, confirming the age falsification.

== Competitive history ==
Year	Event	Team	AA	VT	UB	BB	FX
2005	East Asian Games	3rd place, bronze medalist(s)					
2006	Asian Championships	2nd place, silver medalist(s)		1st place, gold medalist(s)			
2006	Asian Games	DQ		3rd place, bronze medalist(s)			
2007
2007	World Championships			4			
2008	Maribor World Cup			1st place, gold medalist(s)	4		
2008	Olympic Games			1st place, gold medalist(s)			
2009	Summer Universiade	DQ		1st place, gold medalist(s)	3rd place, bronze medalist(s)		
2009	World Championships	—N/a		5			
2010	Moscow World Cup			1st place, gold medalist(s)	6		
2011	North Korea banned from international competition						
2012	North Korea banned from international competition						
2013	Summer Universiade			1st place, gold medalist(s)			
2013	World Championships	—N/a		3rd place, bronze medalist(s)			
2013	East Asian Games	3rd place, bronze medalist(s)		1st place, gold medalist(s)		7	6
2014	Osijek World Cup			8			
2014	Asian Games	2nd place, silver medalist(s)		1st place, gold medalist(s)			
2014	World Championships			1st place, gold medalist(s)			
2015
2015	World Championships			2nd place, silver medalist(s)			
2016
2016	Olympic Games			6			
