= Yun Na-rae =

South Korean artistic gymnast

- Born: 24 April 1997 (age 29) Daegu, South Korea
- Height: 5 ft 1 in (155 cm)

Gymnastics career
- Discipline: Women's artistic gymnastics
- Country represented: South Korea
- Club: Jecheon City Hall
- Head coach: Lee Gwang-yeon
Medal record
Representing South Korea
Asian Games
Bronze medal – third place	2014 Incheon	All-around
Bronze medal – third place	2014 Incheon	Floor exercise

Korean name
- Hangul: 윤나래
- RR: Yun Narae
- MR: Yun Narae

Yun Na-rae (Korean: 윤나래; born 24 April 1997) is a South Korean artistic gymnast. She won bronze medals in the individual all-around and on the floor exercise at the 2014 Asian Games. It was the first medal won by South Korea in the women's artistic individual all-around at the Asian Games. She has competed at the Artistic Gymnastics World Championships three times.

== Gymnastics career ==
Yun began gymnastics when she was six years old, following her older sister into the sport. At the 2012 Junior Asian Championships, she won a bronze medal in the all-around and a silver medal with the team. In the event finals, she won gold medals on the vault, uneven bars, and floor exercise. She then missed the 2013 season due to an elbow injury that required surgery.

Yun made her senior international debut at the 2014 Asian Games and won the all-around bronze medal. This marked the first time a South Korean female gymnast won an all-around medal at the Asian Games. She then won another bronze medal on the floor exercise. After the Asian Games, she competed at the 2014 World Championships in Nanning, China, and finished 45th in the all-around qualifications.

At the 2015 World Championships, Yun competed on the vault, balance beam, and floor exercise for the team that finished 15th and earned a berth to the 2016 Olympic Test Event. There, Yun competed with the South Korean team that finished eighth, and they did not earn a team berth to the 2016 Summer Olympics. Yun was not selected for the individual berth South Korea received.

Yun won the all-around bronze medal at the 2018 South Korean Championships. She returned to international competition at the 2018 Asian Games and helped South Korea finish fourth in the team event. She then competed on all four appartuses at the 2018 World Championships for the team that placed 14th. As of 2025, Yun continues to compete in domestic competitions but has not competed internationally since the 2018 World Championships.
