= Huang Huidan =

Chinese artistic gymnast

- Full name: 黃慧丹 (Huang Huidan)
- Born: 16 May 1996 (age 30)

Gymnastics career
- Discipline: Women's artistic gymnastics
- Country represented: China (2009–2016)
- Head coach: 王群策 (Wang Qunce)、徐惊雷 (Xu Jinglei)
Medal record
Representing China
World Championships
Gold medal – first place	2013 Antwerp	Uneven bars
Silver medal – second place	2014 Nanning	Team
Silver medal – second place	2014 Nanning	Uneven bars
Asian Games
Gold medal – first place	2014 Incheon	Team
Silver medal – second place	2014 Incheon	Uneven bars
Asian Championships
Gold medal – first place	2012 Putian	Team
Silver medal – second place	2012 Putian	Uneven bars
National Games
Silver medal – second place	2013 Liaoning	Team
Bronze medal – third place	2013 Liaoning	Uneven bars

Huang Huidan (Chinese: 黃慧丹) is a Chinese artistic gymnast. She is the 2013 world uneven bars champion and 2014 world uneven bars silver medalist. She represents Zhejiang in domestic competitions.

== Junior career ==
Huang joined the Chinese national team in 2009. At the 2012 Chinese National Championships, she won a silver medal in the uneven bars behind then-reigning Olympic champion He Kexin. Later that year, she competed at the Asian Championships, where she won gold with the Chinese team and another silver in uneven bars.

== 2013 ==
At the 2013 National Games, Huang bested He in uneven bars, taking the gold medal. In October, she competed at the 2013 World Artistic Gymnastics Championships in Antwerp and won the bars title with a score of 15.400.

== 2014 ==
At the Asian Games in the fall of 2014, Huang earned a gold medal with the team and a silver in uneven bars. At the 2014 World Artistic Gymnastics Championships in Nanning, she helped the Chinese team to a silver medal and won another silver in uneven bars.

== 2015 ==
Huang competed at the 2015 Chinese National Championships, where she won a silver medal in bars behind teammate Fan Yilin. She did not compete at the 2015 World Championships in Glasgow because of a shoulder injury.

== Competitive history ==
Year	Event	Team	AA	VT	UB	BB	FX
2009	National Championships	2nd					
2009	National Games	4th					
2010	Asian Championships (Junior)	1st					
2010	National Championships	2nd	5th		3rd		7th
2011	National Championships	2nd	6th		3rd	8th	
2012	National Championships		8th		2nd		
2012	Asian Championships	1st			2nd		
2013	National Championships	4th	7th		1st		
2013	National Games	2nd	8th		3rd	7th	
2013	World Championships				1st		
2014	National Championships	1st			2nd	4th	8th
2014	Asian Games	1st			2nd		
2014	World Championships	2nd			2nd		
2015	National Championships	4th			2nd		
2016	National Championships	4th			3rd		
