= 2015 World Artistic Gymnastics Championships – Women's qualification =

The women's qualification rounds at the 2015 World Artistic Gymnastics Championships took place on 23–24 October 2015 in The SSE Hydro in Glasgow. The top 8 teams advanced to team finals and guaranteed Olympic team berths; teams 9–16 qualified to the Olympic test event in early 2016 to compete for the final 4 team spots.

== Team qualification ==
The top eight teams in qualification advance to the team finals in Glasgow and earn direct qualification status as a team to the 2016 Summer Olympics in Rio de Janeiro, Brazil. Teams placed 9th-16th advance to the Test Event held at the Olympic site in April 2016, from which the top four teams also earn qualification status for the Games.

Rank	Team	Vault (gymnastics)	Uneven bars	Balance beam	Floor (gymnastics)	Total
1	United States	62.099	57.715	57.198	59.599	236.611 Q
1	Simone Biles	16.000	14.666	14.966	15.966	61.598
1	Gabby Douglas	15.300	14.750	13.066	14.400	57.516
1	Brenna Dowell	15.100	11.333	–	13.966	–
1	Madison Kocian	–	15.233	14.000	–	–
1	Maggie Nichols	15.666	–	14.166	14.700	–
1	Aly Raisman	15.133	13.066	14.066	14.533	56.798
2	Russia	60.299	59.907	56.532	54.699	231.437 Q
2	Ksenia Afanasyeva	14.866	–	0.000	14.633	–
2	Maria Kharenkova	–	14.341	14.366	13.300	–
2	Viktoria Komova	15.033	15.300	14.533	–	–
2	Maria Paseka	15.500	14.800	–	13.666	–
2	Daria Spiridonova	13.966	15.466	13.100	12.466	54.998
2	Seda Tutkhalyan	14.900	14.066	14.533	13.100	56.599
3	Great Britain	59.531	55.566	55.299	56.766	227.162 Q
3	Becky Downie	–	13.500	14.100	–	–
3	Ellie Downie	15.066	12.133	13.966	14.400	55.565
3	Claudia Fragapane	14.866	–	13.233	14.600	–
3	Ruby Harrold	14.666	14.666	13.600	13.466	56.398
3	Kelly Simm	14.433	13.700	–	13.566	–
3	Amy Tinkler	14.933	13.700	13.633	14.200	56.466
4	China	58.931	56.098	55.199	54.899	225.127 Q
4	Chen Siyi	14.233	12.800	13.700	13.533	54.266
4	Fan Yilin	–	14.966	13.833	–	–
4	Mao Yi	14.766	–	–	12.500	–
4	Shang Chunsong	14.100	14.666	13.166	14.400	56.332
4	Tan Jiaxin	14.866	13.666	–	12.766	–
4	Wang Yan	15.066	11.800	14.500	14.200	55.566
5	Italy	58.290	54.332	55.432	56.398	224.452 Q
5	Erika Fasana	15.058	13.766	–	14.466	–
5	Vanessa Ferrari	14.366	13.633	13.733	13.933	55.665
5	Carlotta Ferlito	14.266	13.233	14.233	13.933	55.665
5	Elisa Meneghini	14.600	–	12.900	14.066	–
5	Lara Mori	–	12.400	13.733	–	–
5	Tea Ugrin	14.066	13.700	13.733	13.800	55.299
6	Japan	58.033	55.199	54.832	55.799	223.863 Q
6	Sae Miyakawa	14.900	–	–	14.900	–
6	Mai Murakami	14.900	13.700	13.666	14.100	56.366
6	Natsumi Sasada	14.133	13.500	13.233	13.033	53.899
6	Aiko Sugihara	–	13.966	12.800	–	–
6	Asuka Teramoto	13.633	14.033	14.100	13.766	55.532
6	Sakura Yumoto	14.100	12.700	13.833	12.966	53.599
7	Canada	58.133	55.732	54.649	54.266	222.780 Q
7	Ellie Black	14.800	13.733	14.600	14.166	57.299
7	Isabela Onyshko	14.000	14.100	13.416	13.700	55.216
7	Brittany Rogers	15.000	14.166	13.500	–	–
7	Audrey Rousseau	–	13.166	12.500	13.400	–
7	Sydney Townsend	14.333	–	–	12.500	–
7	Victoria Kayen-Woo	13.666	13.733	13.133	13.000	53.532
8	Netherlands	56.016	55.499	55.565	55.274	222.354 Q
8	Mara Titarsolej	13.900	13.366	10.633	13.166	51.065
8	Eythora Thorsdottir	13.766	13.633	14.233	13.508	55.140
8	Lisa Top	14.300	–	12.333	13.700	–
8	Tisha Volleman	13.916	13.333	–	13.866	–
8	Lieke Wevers	13.900	14.400	14.233	14.200	56.733
8	Sanne Wevers	–	14.100	14.766	–	–
9	Brazil	58.132	51.966	56.132	55.631	221.861 R
9	Jade Barbosa	14.833	11.633	14.200	13.433	54.099
9	Daniele Hypólito	14.300	12.300	13.866	13.966	54.432
9	Thauany Araújo	14.144	12.800	12.800	–	–
9	Letícia Costa	–	–	–	12.433	–
9	Flávia Saraiva	14.233	13.266	14.133	14.166	55.798
9	Lorrane Oliveira	14.766	13.600	13.933	14.066	56.365
10	France	56.232	55.357	53.031	55.299	219.919
10	Marine Brevet	14.133	13.633	13.233	14.133	55.132
10	Loan His	14.200	14.466	–	13.800	–
10	Anne Kuhm	13.933	13.600	13.366	–	–
10	Claire Martin	–	–	13.466	13.766	–
10	Valentine Pikul	13.833	13.659	12.200	13.100	52.791
10	Louise Vanhille	13.966	13.300	12.966	13.600	53.832
11	Belgium	56.149	53.732	54.800	55.099	219.780
11	Julie Croket	–	–	12.800	–	–
11	Rune Hermans	14.000	13.566	13.800	13.966	55.322
11	Gaelle Mys	14.133	12.233	13.300	13.800	53.466
11	Cindy Vandenhole	14.100	14.033	–	12.933	–
11	Lisa Verschueren	13.916	13.900	13.700	13.933	55.499
11	Laura Waem	13.700	12.066	14.000	13.400	53.166
12	Germany	56.898	55.532	53.432	53.399	219.261
12	Leah Griesser	–	13.200	12.433	12.766	–
12	Lisa Katharina Hill	13.933	12.766	–	–	–
12	Pauline Schäfer	14.533	13.233	14.300	13.733	55.799
12	Sophie Scheder	14.166	15.033	12.533	12.566	54.298
12	Elisabeth Seitz	14.066	14.066	13.766	13.400	55.298
12	Pauline Tratz	14.133	–	12.833	13.500	–
13	Romania	58.156	49.133	54.932	54.990	217.220
13	Diana Bulimar	13.958	11.100	13.766	13.800	53.599
13	Larisa Iordache	14.866	13.200	13.866	13.766	55.698
13	Andreea Iridon	–	11.900	13.500	12.300	–
13	Laura Jurca	14.766	12.933	13.833	13.800	55.332
13	Silvia Zarzu	14.566	11.066	11.700	13.633	50.965
14	Australia	56.600	52.748	51.632	53.832	214.812
14	Georgia Godwin	14.000	13.066	12.300	13.766	53.132
14	Madelaine Leydin	14.000	13.383	12.933	13.333	53.649
14	Emily Little	14.800	–	13.166	13.233	–
14	Larrissa Miller	–	14.166	–	13.500	–
14	Mary-Anne Monckton	13.800	11.933	12.200	–	–
14	Kiara Munteanu	13.733	12.133	13.233	13.166	52.265
15	South Korea	55.932	53.298	52.082	52.432	213.744
15	Eum Da-yeon	13.833	13.533	12.700	–	–
15	Heo Seon-mi	14.066	13.966	13.533	13.433	54.998
15	Kim Chae-yeon	13.800	13.133	11.833	13.133	51.889
15	Lee Hye-been	14.000	12.666	–	13.100	–
15	Park Ji-soo	–	10.666	12.466	12.766	–
15	Yun Na-rae	14.033	–	13.383	12.633	–
16	Switzerland	56.765	50.065	52.965	53.699	213.494
16	Caterina Barloggio	–	11.633	13.333	12.500	–
16	Jessica Diacci	13.566	11.266	12.600	–	–
16	Nicole Hitz	12.966	–	11.833	13.100	–
16	Ilaria Käslin	13.833	12.891	13.566	13.166	53.456
16	Laura Schulte	13.866	11.400	–	12.900	–
16	Giulia Steingruber	15.500	14.141	13.466	14.533	57.640
17	Spain	55.865	52.964	50.366	50.899	210.094
17	Claudia Colom	13.666	12.966	12.333	12.266	51.231
17	Nora Fernández	14.100	–	13.200	12.366	–
17	Ana Pérez	13.966	12.666	11.700	13.200	51.532
17	Roxana Popa	–	12.766	–	–	–
17	Natalia Ros	13.933	13.566	12.033	12.800	52.332
17	Maria Paula Vargas	13.866	13.666	12.800	12.533	52.865
18	Hungary	56.156	51.632	49.465	52.299	209.552
18	Dorina Böczögő	13.100	13.133	12.466	13.433	52.132
18	Boglárka Dévai	14.858	11.866	–	–	–
18	Luca Divéky	13.666	11.733	11.433	12.400	–
18	Kitti Honti	–	12.400	10.600	12.333	–
18	Enikő Horváth	13.666	–	11.733	12.766	–
18	Noémi Makra	13.966	14.233	13.833	13.700	55.732
19	Poland	55.765	51.465	51.065	50.232	208.527
19	Claudia Chmielowska	13.866	–	–	12.533	–
19	Gabriela Janik	14.200	12.633	12.233	11.366	50.432
19	Katarzyna Jurkowska-Kowalska	12.900	13.366	13.033	12.833	52.132
19	Klara Kopeć	–	–	11.400	–	–
19	Alma Kuc	13.766	11.933	11.966	12.100	49.765
19	Marta Pihan-Kulesza	13.933	13.533	13.833	12.766	54.065
20	North Korea	56.732	50.825	48.365	52.065	207.987
20	Hong Un-jong	15.566	12.825	11.566	13.033	52.990
20	Jong Un-gyong	13.666	12.900	9.900	12.666	49.132
20	Kang Yong-mi	13.700	11.633	8.966	12.733	47.032
20	Kim So-yong	12.866	12.700	13.233	13.033	51.832
20	Pak Sin-hyang	13.800	12.400	13.666	13.266	53.132
21	Mexico	56.966	51.265	48.298	50.099	206.628
21	Elsa García	–	–	–	–	–
21	Ana Lago	14.633	12.166	12.066	12.200	51.065
21	Alexa Moreno	15.033	13.066	12.400	13.366	53.865
21	Karla Retiz	13.600	12.833	11.866	12.033	50.332
21	Ahtziri Sandoval	12.666	13.200	–	–	–
21	Karla Torres	13.700	10.833	11.966	12.500	48.999
22	Sweden	55.432	49.632	50.866	50.332	206.262
22	Ece Ayan	–	11.466	12.000	12.900	–
22	Stina Estberg	13.400	12.900	13.200	11.433	50.933
22	Emma Larsson	14.100	10.866	11.366	12.866	49.198
22	Kim Singmuang	13.766	13.233	12.333	11.800	51.132
22	Marcela Torres	13.866	12.033	–	12.766	–
22	Veronica Wagner	13.700	–	13.333	–	–
23	Austria	54.198	49.865	47.632	50.098	201.793
23	Lisa Ecker	13.866	12.933	12.966	12.766	52.531
23	Elisa Hämmerle	13.966	13.266	12.533	13.666	53.431
23	Olivia Jochum	–	10.866	10.933	12.100	–
23	Jasmin Mader	13.533	12.800	10.766	11.566	48.665
23	Marlies Männersdorfer	12.833	10.200	11.200	11.166	45.399
24	Greece	52.365	48.381	48.998	49.199	198.943
24	Argyro Afrati	13.500	12.891	11.433	12.133	49.957
24	Vasiliki Millousi	–	13.066	13.766	11.633	–
24	Evangelia Monokrousou	13.366	–	11.866	12.433	–
24	Evangelia Plyta	12.533	10.933	10.166	11.833	45.465
24	Maria Simou	–	11.166	–	–	–
24	Ioanna Xoulogi	12.966	11.258	11.933	12.800	48.957

== Individual all-around ==
Rank	Gymnast	Nation	Vault (gymnastics)	Uneven bars	Balance beam	Floor (gymnastics)	Total	Qual.
1	Simone Biles	United States	16.000	14.666	14.966	15.966	61.598	Q
2	Giulia Steingruber	Switzerland	15.500	14.141	13.466	14.533	57.640	Q
3	Gabby Douglas	United States	15.300	14.750	13.066	14.400	57.516	Q
4	Ellie Black	Canada	14.800	13.733	14.600	14.166	57.299	Q
5	Aly Raisman	United States	15.133	13.066	14.066	14.533	56.798	-
6	Lieke Wevers	Netherlands	13.900	14.400	14.233	14.200	56.733	Q
7	Seda Tutkhalyan	Russia	14.900	14.066	14.533	13.100	56.599	Q
8	Amy Tinkler	United Kingdom	14.933	13.700	13.633	14.200	56.466	Q
9	Ruby Harrold	United Kingdom	14.666	14.666	13.600	13.466	56.398	Q
10	Mai Murakami	Japan	14.900	13.700	13.666	14.100	56.366	Q
11	Lorrane Oliveira	Brazil	14.766	13.600	13.933	14.066	56.365	Q
12	Shang Chunsong	China	14.100	14.666	13.166	14.400	56.332	Q
13	Pauline Schäfer	Germany	14.533	13.233	14.300	13.733	55.799	Q
14	Flávia Saraiva	Brazil	14.233	13.266	14.133	14.166	55.798	Q
15	Noémi Makra	Hungary	13.966	14.233	13.833	13.700	55.732	Q
16	Larisa Iordache	Romania	14.866	13.200	13.866	13.766	55.698	Q
17	Carlotta Ferlito	Italy	14.266	13.233	14.233	13.933	55.665	Q
18	Vanessa Ferrari	Italy	14.366	13.633	13.733	13.933	55.665	Q
19	Wang Yan	China	15.066	11.800	14.500	14.200	55.566	Q
20	Ellie Downie	United Kingdom	15.066	12.133	13.966	14.400	55.565	–
21	Asuka Teramoto	Japan	13.633	14.033	14.100	13.766	55.532	Q
22	Lisa Verschueren	Belgium	13.916	13.900	13.700	13.933	55.449	Q
23	Laura Jurca	Romania	14.766	12.933	12.933	13.800	55.332	Q
24	Rune Hermans	Belgium	14.000	13.566	13.800	13.966	55.332	Q
25	Tea Ugrin	Italy	14.066	13.700	13.733	13.800	55.299	–
26	Elisabeth Seitz	Germany	14.066	14.066	13.766	13.400	55.298	Q
27	Isabela Onyshko	Canada	14.000	14.100	13.416	13.700	55.216	Q
28	Eythora Thorsdottir	Netherlands	13.766	13.633	14.233	13.508	55.140	R
29	Marine Brevet	France	14.133	13.633	13.233	14.133	55.132	R
30	Daria Spiridonova	Russia	13.966	15.466	13.100	12.466	54.998	R
31	Heo Seon-mi	South Korea	14.066	13.966	13.533	13.433	54.998	R
32	Daniele Hypólito	Brazil	5.300 14.300 (52)	5.300 12.300 (108)	5.700 13.866 (22)	5.900 13.966 (24)	54.432	
33	Sophie Scheder	Germany	5.000 14.166 (60)	6.600 15.033 (4)	5.600 12.533 (101)	5.000 12.566 (131)	54.298	
34	Chen Siyi	China	5.800 14.233 (55)	5.800 12.800 (87)	5.600 13.700 (37)	5.500 13.533 (48)	54.266	
35	Jessica López	Venezuela	5.800 14.733 (35)	6.000 13.066 (69)	5.400 12.966 (77)	5.500 13.466 (54)	54.231	
36	Ana Filipa Martins	Portugal	5.000 13.966 (86)	5.600 12.933 (76)	5.400 13.300 (56)	5.700 14.000 (21)	54.199	
37	Jade Barbosa	Brazil	5.800 14.833 (26)	5.900 11.633 (140)	5.700 14.200 (12)	5.700 13.433 (57)	54.099	
38	Marta Pihan-Kulesza	Poland	5.000 13.933 (97)	5.600 13.533 (45)	5.900 13.833 (27)	5.400 12.766 (116)	54.065	
39	Natsumi Sasada	Japan	5.000 14.133 (63)	5.400 13.500 (46)	5.900 13.233 (63)	5.300 13.033 (87)	53.899	
40	Alexa Moreno	Mexico	6.200 15.033 (13)	5.400 13.066 (66)	5.100 12.400 (109)	5.700 13.366 (62)	53.865	
41	Louise Vanhille	France	5.000 13.966 (86)	5.800 13.300 (53)	5.100 12.966 (76)	5.100 13.600 (45)	53.832	
42	Madelaine Leydin	Australia	5.300 14.000 (80)	5.500 13.383 (48)	5.200 12.933 (80)	5.400 13.333 (63)	53.649	
43	Sakura Yumoto	Japan	5.000 14.100 (68)	4.800 12.700 (90)	5.500 13.833 (25)	5.600 12.966 (92)	53.599	
44	Victoria-Kayen Woo	Canada	5.000 13.666 (150)	5.500 13.733 (28)	5.100 13.133 (69)	5.100 13.000 (90)	53.532	
45	Gaelle Mys	Belgium	5.000 14.133 (63)	5.100 12.233 (110)	5.600 13.300 (57)	5.300 13.800 (30)	53.466	
46	Ilaria Käslin	Switzerland	5.000 13.833 (117)	5.200 12.891 (81)	5.600 13.566 (42)	5.200 13.166 (73)	53.456	
47	Elisa Hämmerle	Austria	5.200 13.966 (86)	5.200 13.266 (54)	5.500 12.533 (100)	5.600 13.666 (43)	53.431	
48	Laura Waem	Belgium	5.000 13.700 (143)	5.800 12.066 (119)	5.500 14.000 (18)	5.000 13.400 (58)	53.166	
49	Georgia Godwin	Australia	5.000 14.000 (80)	5.500 13.066 (67)	5.800 12.300 (120)	5.800 13.766 (36)	53.132	
50	Pak Sin-hyang	North Korea	5.000 13.800 (123)	5.800 12.400 (105)	5.800 13.666 (38)	5.300 13.266 (65)	53.132	
51	Oksana Chusovitina	Uzbekistan	7.000 14.766 (30)	4.500 12.033 (120)	5.300 13.466 (47)	4.900 12.733 (118)	52.998	
52	Hong Un-jong	North Korea	6.300 15.566 (3)	5.100 12.825 (84)	4.900 11.566 (155)	5.700 13.033 (88)	52.99	
53	Maria Paula Vargas	Spain	5.000 13.866 (107)	5.500 13.666 (34)	5.400 12.800 (88)	5.100 12.533 (134)	52.865	
54	Valentine Pikul	France	5.200 13.833 (117)	5.700 13.658 (36)	5.300 12.200 (123)	5.000 13.100 (82)	52.791	
55	Marcia Vidiaux	Cuba	6.000 14.833 (26)	5.300 12.433 (101)	5.500 12.400 (110)	5.600 12.966 (92)	52.632	
56	Diana Bulimar	Romania	5.000 13.958 (96)	5.200 11.100 (166)	5.700 13.733 (35)	5.800 13.800 (33)	52.591	
57	Lisa Ecker	Austria	5.000 13.866 (107)	4.800 12.933 (74)	5.600 12.966 (78)	5.000 12.766 (111)	52.531	
58	Teja Belak	Slovenia	5.300 14.366 (49)	5.000 12.891 (80)	5.500 12.666 (95)	5.100 12.566 (130)	52.489	
59	Thema Williams	Trinidad and Tobago	5.000 13.966 (86)	4.700 12.600 (98)	4.700 12.400 (108)	5.300 13.500 (50)	52.466	
60	Natalia Ros	Spain	5.000 13.933 (97)	5.900 13.566 (43)	5.200 12.033 (132)	5.000 12.800 (106)	52.332	
61	Kiara Munteanu	Australia	5.000 13.733 (139)	5.600 12.133 (115)	5.300 13.233 (59)	5.400 13.166 (74)	52.265	
62	Ariana Orrego	Peru	5.000 14.033 (77)	5.500 12.633 (96)	4.900 12.833 (83)	5.200 12.666 (122)	52.165	
63	Dorina Böczögő	Hungary	4.400 13.100 (185)	5.200 13.133 (63)	4.900 12.466 (104)	5.500 13.433 (56)	52.132	
64	Katarzyna Jurkowska-Kowalska	Poland	5.400 12.900 (200)	5.200 13.366 (50)	5.700 13.033 (73)	5.100 12.833 (103)	52.132	
65	Ana Sofia Gómez	Guatemala	5.800 14.433 (44)	5.600 11.500 (146)	6.000 13.066 (72)	5.600 13.000 (91)	51.999	
66	Danusia Francis	Jamaica	5.000 13.866 (107)	4.600 12.200 (111)	4.700 12.933 (79)	4.900 13.000 (89)	51.999	
67	Tutya Yılmaz	Turkey	5.000 13.966 (86)	4.900 11.300 (159)	5.900 13.533 (44)	5.300 13.166 (75)	51.965	
68	Houry Gebeshian	Armenia	5.000 14.100 (68)	4.800 12.966 (71)	4.900 12.033 (131)	4.700 12.866 (100)	51.965	
69	Farah Ann Abdul Hadi	Malaysia	5.000 13.866 (107)	5.700 12.566 (100)	5.300 12.500 (103)	5.100 13.033 (86)	51.965	
70	Farah Boufadene	Algeria	5.000 13.766 (132)	5.600 12.633 (97)	5.300 12.633 (96)	5.200 12.933 (96)	51.965	
71	Courtney McGregor	New Zealand	5.800 14.766 (30)	5.100 11.600 (141)	5.400 12.800 (88)	5.300 12.766 (115)	51.932	
72	Kim Chae-yeon	South Korea	5.000 13.800 (123)	5.500 13.133 (64)	5.600 11.833 (143)	5.300 13.133 (78)	51.899	
73	Alaina Kwan	Belarus	5.000 13.900 (103)	5.500 11.833 (133)	5.500 13.000 (75)	5.400 13.133 (77)	51.866	
74	Kim So-yong	North Korea	4.400 12.866 (204)	5.100 12.700 (91)	5.700 13.233 (61)	5.000 13.033 (85)	51.832	
75	Kylie Dickson	Belarus	5.800 14.533 (42)	5.500 12.600 (99)	5.200 12.300 (119)	5.100 12.200 (169)	51.633	
76	Ana Pérez	Spain	5.000 13.966 (86)	5.700 12.666 (93)	5.200 11.700 (147)	5.400 13.200 (70)	51.532	
77	Marisa Dick	Trinidad and Tobago	5.000 13.733 (139)	4.600 12.400 (102)	5.100 13.000 (74)	4.900 12.366 (152)	51.499	
78	Demet Mutlu	Turkey	5.000 13.800 (123)	5.200 12.633 (94)	4.800 12.300 (118)	4.700 12.633 (124)	51.366	
79	Claudia Colom	Spain	5.000 13.666 (150)	5.800 12.966 (73)	5.200 12.333 (114)	5.100 12.266 (165)	51.231	
80	Ailen Valente	Argentina	5.000 13.766 (132)	5.400 12.366 (107)	5.000 12.566 (99)	4.900 12.466 (144)	51.164	
81	Kim Singmuang	Sweden	5.000 13.766 (132)	5.700 13.233 (58)	5.200 12.333 (114)	5.100 11.800 (195)	51.132	
82	Ang Tracie	Malaysia	4.800 13.766 (132)	4.800 11.466 (148)	5.000 12.733 (92)	5.000 13.166 (71)	51.131	
83	Mara Titarsolej	Netherlands	5.200 13.900 (103)	5.100 13.366 (49)	5.200 10.633 (201)	5.000 13.166 (71)	51.065	
84	Ana Lago	Mexico	5.800 14.633 (37)	5.400 12.166 (113)	5.700 12.066 (130)	5.400 12.200 (170)	51.065	
85	Phan Thị Hà Thanh	Vietnam	5.800 14.400 (47)	4.100 10.233 (193)	5.800 13.300 (58)	5.500 13.100 (84)	51.033	
86	Silvia Zarzu	Romania	5.800 14.566 (41)	5.000 11.066 (168)	5.400 11.700 (148)	5.700 13.633 (44)	50.965	
87	Stina Estberg	Sweden	4.400 13.400 (168)	5.000 12.900 (78)	5.000 13.200 (64)	5.000 11.433 (213)	50.933	
88	Marina Nekrasova	Azerbaijan	5.000 13.733 (139)	4.600 11.900 (127)	4.500 12.066 (128)	5.300 13.233 (66)	50.932	
89	Dovélis Torres	Cuba	5.800 14.433 (44)	5.200 12.141 (114)	5.300 12.833 (84)	5.600 11.333 (216)	50.74	
90	Barbora Mokošová	Slovakia	5.000 13.800 (123)	5.200 13.058 (70)	4.800 11.566 (153)	4.600 12.300 (161)	50.724	
91	Angelina Kysla	Ukraine	5.000 14.033 (77)	5.700 13.333 (52)	5.400 10.733 (197)	5.100 12.566 (132)	50.665	
92	Simona Castro	Chile	5.000 13.966 (86)	4.900 12.933 (75)	5.200 10.300 (208)	5.300 13.400 (60)	50.599	
93	Toni-Ann Williams	Jamaica	5.000 14.133 (63)	3.800 10.766 (180)	5.000 12.766 (91)	5.400 12.866 (102)	50.531	
94	Ellis O'Reilly	Ireland	4.800 13.533 (162)	4.300 11.966 (122)	4.800 12.700 (93)	4.600 12.300 (160)	50.499	
95	Ana Đerek	Croatia	5.200 13.866 (107)	3.800 10.266 (192)	4.700 12.800 (85)	5.400 13.566 (46)	50.498	
96	Tjaša Kysselef	Slovenia	5.300 14.400 (47)	3.300 11.166 (163)	4.600 12.100 (126)	4.700 12.800 (104)	50.466	
97	Gabriela Janik	Poland	5.300 14.200 (57)	5.300 12.633 (95)	4.900 12.233 (121)	4.900 11.366 (215)	50.432	
98	Irina Sazonova	Iceland	5.000 13.833 (117)	5.600 11.333 (156)	5.200 12.066 (129)	5.400 13.166 (76)	50.398	
99	Karla Retiz	Mexico	5.000 13.600 (160)	5.600 12.833 (83)	4.500 11.866 (140)	5.000 12.033 (183)	50.332	
100	Ginna Escobar	Colombia	5.000 13.866 (107)	5.400 11.966 (123)	5.100 12.433 (106)	4.800 12.033 (184)	50.298	
101	Ivet Rojas	Venezuela	5.000 13.800 (123)	5.200 12.966 (72)	4.900 11.000 (183)	5.100 12.500 (140)	50.266	
102	Maria Smirnova	Azerbaijan	5.000 13.700 (143)	4.000 11.466 (147)	4.000 12.066 (127)	5.000 12.800 (106)	50.032	
103	Dipa Karmakar	India	7.000 15.100 (8)	4.500 10.000 (201)	5.700 12.333 (117)	5.400 12.533 (135)	49.966	
104	Argyro Afrati	Greece	4.800 13.500 (165)	5.300 12.891 (82)	4.600 11.433 (166)	5.500 12.133 (177)	49.957	
105	Alma Kuc	Poland	5.000 13.766 (132)	5.500 11.933 (126)	5.400 11.966 (136)	5.100 12.100 (179)	49.765	
106	Mariana Chiarella	Peru	5.000 13.700 (143)	4.500 11.133 (165)	5.200 12.000 (134)	5.100 12.800 (108)	49.633	
107	Claudia Cummins	South Africa	5.000 13.833 (117)	4.800 11.733 (135)	5.300 11.633 (150)	5.000 12.433 (146)	49.632	
108	Nadine Joy Nathan	Singapore	5.000 13.533 (162)	4.700 10.933 (173)	5.100 12.366 (111)	5.100 12.766 (112)	49.598	
109	Bianca Mann	South Africa	5.000 13.666 (150)	4.900 11.500 (145)	4.700 11.533 (157)	4.900 12.733 (118)	49.432	
110	Yulia Inshina	Azerbaijan	5.000 13.800 (123)	5.000 10.966 (172)	5.100 11.500 (164)	5.300 13.133 (78)	49.399	
111	Marcela Sandoval	Colombia	4.400 13.266 (175)	4.600 12.200 (111)	4.900 12.566 (98)	4.300 11.366 (214)	49.398	
112	Luca Divéky	Hungary	4.800 13.666 (150)	4.800 11.733 (135)	4.300 11.433 (165)	4.600 12.400 (148)	49.232	
113	Emma Larsson	Sweden	5.000 14.100 (68)	5.300 10.866 (176)	5.000 11.366 (170)	5.200 12.866 (101)	49.198	
114	Paula Mejías	Puerto Rico	6.000 14.900 (17)	4.400 10.233 (194)	5.000 10.800 (191)	5.500 13.233 (68)	49.166	
115	Dilnoza Abdusalimova	Uzbekistan	4.800 13.300 (173)	4.700 11.666 (137)	5.000 11.266 (177)	5.200 12.933 (96)	49.165	
116	Jong Un-gyong	North Korea	5.000 13.666 (150)	5.400 12.900 (79)	4.5 9.900 (219)	5.400 12.666 (123)	49.132	
117	Kirsten Beckett	South Africa	4.700 13.433 (167)	4.700 11.866 (130)	4.800 11.833 (142)	4.900 12.000 (186)	49.132	
118	Charlotte Sullivan	New Zealand	4.700 13.366 (170)	4.700 10.166 (198)	5.400 13.166 (67)	5.300 12.366 (155)	49.064	
119	Sherine El-Zeiny	Egypt	5.000 13.633 (157)	5.400 11.433 (150)	4.500 11.566 (152)	4.900 12.400 (150)	49.032	
120	Amaranta Torres	Mexico	5.000 13.700 (143)	4.300 10.833 (177)	5.300 11.966 (135)	5.100 12.500 (140)	48.999	
121	Ioanna Xoulogi	Greece	4.400 12.966 (192)	5.200 11.258 (161)	5.000 11.933 (138)	4.700 12.800 (104)	48.957	
122	Ava Verdeflor	Philippines	5.000 13.733 (139)	4.600 12.366 (106)	4.100 10.666 (200)	4.600 12.066 (180)	48.831	
123	Ashly Lau	Singapore	4.400 12.900 (200)	4.400 11.833 (132)	5.300 11.533 (160)	4.600 12.500 (137)	48.766	
124	Jasmin Mader	Austria	5.000 13.533 (162)	5.100 12.800 (85)	4.900 10.766 (194)	4.800 11.566 (208)	48.665	
125	Veronika Cenková	Czech Republic	4.400 13.016 (190)	4.800 11.566 (142)	5.100 11.300 (175)	4.900 12.633 (126)	48.515	
126	Rifda Irfanaluthfi	Indonesia	4.400 12.966 (192)	3	5.100 12.366 (112)	5.200 13.200 (69)	48.332	
127	Aleksandra Rajčić	Serbia	4.200 13.100 (185)	4.800 12.233 (109)	3.400 10.766 (192)	4.500 12.133 (176)	48.232	
128	Tzuf Feldon	Israel	4.200 12.933 (196)	4.700 11.500 (143)	5.100 11.566 (156)	4.900 12.233 (168)	48.232	
129	Maria Stoffel	Argentina	4.400 12.900 (200)	5.200 11.366 (153)	5.100 11.766 (144)	5.000 12.166 (175)	48.198	
130	Isabella Amado	Panama	5.000 13.800 (123)	4.700 11.000 (170)	5.500 11.533 (161)	4.800 11.800 (194)	48.133	
131	Franchesca Santi	Chile	5.800 14.600 (39)	4.800 11.400 (151)	4.5 9.700 (223)	5.300 12.400 (151)	48.1	
132	Anna Geidt	Kazakhstan	4.800 13.400 (168)	4.700 11.333 (155)	4.800 11.533 (158)	4.900 11.833 (192)	48.099	
133	Yamilet Peña	Dominican Republic	7.000 14.633 (37)	4.500 11.333 (154)	4.100 10.166 (209)	5.300 11.766 (197)	47.898	
134	Yu Ju Lo	Chinese Taipei	5.000 13.833 (117)	3.200 10.633 (184)	4.500 11.233 (178)	4.500 12.166 (173)	47.865	
135	Linnea Wang	Denmark	4.400 13.166 (182)	4.000 11.066 (167)	4.500 11.366 (168)	4.700 12.266 (163)	47.864	
136	Annika Urvikko	Finland	5.000 13.983 (85)	5.4	4.400 11.500 (163)	5.100 12.600 (129)	47.849	
137	Janessa Dai	Singapore	4.600 12.933 (196)	4.500 10.500 (185)	4.800 12.200 (122)	4.700 12.191 (171)	47.824	
138	Nancy Mohamed Taman	Egypt	5.000 14.166 (60)	4.500 10.000 (201)	4.800 11.300 (173)	4.800 12.266 (164)	47.732	
139	Radoslava Kalamárová	Slovakia	4.000 12.533 (221)	5.000 11.933 (124)	5.100 11.533 (159)	4.900 11.633 (202)	47.632	
140	Tan Ing Yueh	Malaysia	5.200 13.233 (178)	4.900 10.433 (189)	5.400 11.333 (172)	4.600 12.600 (128)	47.599	
141	Romana Majerechová	Czech Republic	4.400 13.200 (180)	4.400 10.433 (187)	5.000 11.566 (154)	4.700 12.400 (149)	47.599	
142	Diana Vásquez	Bolivia	5.000 13.700 (143)	2.300 10.133 (199)	4.800 12.133 (125)	4.700 11.433 (212)	47.399	
143	Monica Sileoni	Finland	4.600 13.466 (166)	4.500 10.800 (179)	4.400 11.266 (176)	4.500 11.866 (189)	47.398	
144	Nada Ayman Ibrahim	Egypt	4.200 12.833 (205)	4.600 12.100 (117)	4.600 10.066 (215)	5.000 12.333 (158)	47.332	
145	Ekin Morova	Turkey	4.800 13.266 (175)	4.800 11.500 (144)	5.100 11.000 (184)	5.300 11.566 (207)	47.332	
146	Nicole Mawhinney	Ireland	4.600 13.266 (175)	4.100 10.700 (182)	4.900 11.100 (181)	4.800 12.166 (174)	47.232	
147	Mariana Carvalho	Portugal	4.600 13.166 (182)	4.600 11.300 (158)	4.700 10.933 (187)	4.600 11.766 (196)	47.165	
148	Dominiqua Belányi	Iceland	4.400 13.166 (182)	4.800 11.200 (162)	4.500 10.533 (203)	4.400 12.166 (172)	47.065	
149	Kang Yong-mi	North Korea	5.000 13.700 (143)	5.000 11.633 (138)	4.3 8.966 (229)	5.100 12.733 (120)	47.032	
150	Thea Nygaard	Norway	4.200 12.966 (192)	4.500 10.966 (171)	4.800 10.833 (188)	4.500 12.033 (181)	46.798	
151	Eva Mičková	Czech Republic	4.200 12.600 (219)	4.000 11.033 (169)	4.100 10.800 (189)	4.400 12.300 (159)	46.733	
152	Giulianna Pino	Ecuador	4.200 12.733 (212)	3.8	5.100 11.300 (174)	4.900 12.633 (126)	46.632	
153	Valērija Grišāne	Latvia	4.600 13.366 (170)	3.3	3.900 10.500 (204)	4.900 12.933 (95)	46.499	
154	Katriel de Sousa	Venezuela	5.200 13.666 (150)	4.800 10.433 (188)	4.800 10.766 (193)	5.200 11.600 (206)	46.465	
155	Andrea Maldonado	Puerto Rico	5.000 13.766 (132)	4.7	5.300 10.966 (185)	5.100 12.700 (121)	46.432	
156	Valentina Rashkova	Bulgaria	4.400 13.000 (191)	5.000 11.900 (128)	3.700 10.033 (217)	4.500 11.300 (217)	46.233	
157	Alina Circene	Latvia	4.200 12.933 (196)	3.3	5.200 12.333 (114)	4.600 11.500 (209)	46.199	
158	Norma Róbertsdóttir	Iceland	5.300 14.200 (57)	2.9	4.100 11.600 (151)	5.000 11.633 (203)	46.166	
159	Tara Donnelly	Ireland	4.400 13.100 (185)	2.800 10.000 (200)	4.800 10.733 (196)	4.700 12.333 (157)	46.166	
160	Valentina Brostella	Panama	4.000 12.516 (223)	3.900 10.166 (196)	4.700 11.633 (149)	4.700 11.700 (199)	46.015	
161	Paola Moreira	Puerto Rico	5.200 13.966 (86)	3.8	4.500 10.366 (207)	4.900 11.733 (198)	45.965	
162	Mai Liu Hsiang-Han	Chinese Taipei	4.200 12.800 (208)	4.400 10.800 (178)	5.000 10.700 (198)	4.600 11.600 (204)	45.9	
163	Stella Savvidou	Cyprus	5.000 13.900 (103)	4.600 10.333 (191)	4.400 10.166 (210)	4.700 11.500 (210)	45.899	
164	Đỗ Thị Vân Anh	Vietnam	5.000 13.633 (157)	4.2	5.200 10.700 (199)	4.900 12.366 (153)	45.699	
165	Sara Raposeiro	Portugal	4.600 13.233 (178)	4.400 10.366 (190)	4.7 9.800 (222)	4.000 12.233 (166)	45.632	
166	Albena Zlatkova	Bulgaria	5.000 13.800 (123)	3.6	4.300 10.400 (205)	5.100 12.500 (138)	45.466	
167	Evangelia Plyta	Greece	4.000 12.533 (221)	5.800 10.933 (174)	4.900 10.166 (211)	4.500 11.833 (191)	45.465	
168	Dina Madir	Croatia	4.400 13.200 (180)	4.500 10.166 (197)	4.4 9.800 (221)	4.600 12.233 (167)	45.399	
169	Marlies Männersdorfer	Austria	4.200 12.833 (205)	4.500 10.200 (195)	4.300 11.200 (179)	4.200 11.166 (219)	45.399	
170	Martine Skregelid	Norway	4.400 13.066 (188)	3.5	4.700 11.366 (169)	4.700 11.866 (190)	45.298	
171	Viktoria Komova	Russia	5.800 15.033 (13)	6.500 15.300 (2)	5.700 14.533 (4)		44.866	
172	Kaisa Chirinos	Honduras	4.000 12.366 (226)	3.6	4.400 11.733 (145)	4.500 11.900 (187)	44.832	
173	Sofie Bråten	Norway	4.400 12.733 (212)	4.4	4.200 10.366 (206)	4.500 12.033 (181)	44.632	
174	Nato Dzidziguri	Georgia	4.600 12.766 (209)	2.900 10.466 (186)	5.1 9.900 (220)	4.800 11.466 (211)	44.598	
175	Maggie Nichols	United States	6.300 15.666 (2)		5.800 14.166 (13)	6.200 14.700 (3)	44.532	
176	Elena Rega	Uzbekistan	4.200 12.633 (217)	5.1	4.200 11.500 (162)	3.700 11.633 (200)	44.366	
177	Zhanerke Duisek	Kazakhstan	4.400 11.900 (228)	4.500 10.000 (201)	5.200 11.366 (171)	4.500 11.033 (223)	44.299	
178	Sarah El Dabagh	Denmark	4.200 12.700 (214)	1.8	4.500 11.033 (182)	4.600 11.800 (193)	44.233	
179	Maria Paseka	Russia	6.400 15.500 (4)	6.100 14.800 (6)		5.400 13.666 (42)	43.966	
180	Diana Jerofejeva	Latvia	4.400 12.900 (200)	2.2	4 9.533 (224)	4.200 12.000 (185)	43.666	
181	Erika Fasana	Italy	5.800 15.058 (12)	5.700 13.766 (27)		6.000 14.466 (8)	43.29	
182	Karmen Koljanin	Croatia	4.200 12.566 (220)	3.5	4.600 11.100 (180)	4.600 11.066 (221)	42.732	
183	Claudia Fragapane	United Kingdom	5.800 14.866 (21)		5.700 13.233 (61)	6.300 14.600 (5)	42.699	
184	Brittany Rogers	Canada	5.800 15.000 (15)	6.300 14.166 (16)	5.600 13.500 (45)		42.666	
185	Vaida Žitinevičiūtė	Lithuania	4.600 12.766 (209)	3.5	4.6 9.500 (225)	4.400 11.233 (218)	42.565	
186	Loan His	France	5.000 14.200 (57)	6.100 14.466 (11)		5.400 13.800 (31)	42.466	
187	Maria Kharenkova	Russia		5.800 14.341 (13)	5.900 14.366 (7)	5.600 13.300 (64)	42.007	
188	Debora Reis	Uruguay	4.400 11.766 (229)	3.6	4.200 10.800 (190)	3.800 11.033 (222)	41.899	
189	Kelly Simm	United Kingdom	5.600 14.433 (44)	6.100 13.700 (33)		5.800 13.566 (47)	41.699	
190	Elisa Meneghini	Italy	5.300 14.600 (39)		5.600 12.900 (81)	5.600 14.066 (19)	41.566	
191	Aida Bauyrzhanova	Kazakhstan	4.400 12.933 (196)	4.9	4.8 9.333 (227)	4.300 11.600 (205)	41.466	
192	Tan Jiaxin	China	5.800 14.866 (21)	6.700 13.666 (35)		5.600 12.766 (117)	41.298	
193	Emily Little	Australia	5.800 14.800 (28)		5.000 13.166 (66)	5.300 13.233 (66)	41.199	
194	Tisha Volleman	Netherlands	5.000 13.916 (101)	5.000 13.333 (51)		5.600 13.866 (28)	41.115	
195	Cindy Vandenhole	Belgium	5.000 14.100 (68)	5.800 14.033 (22)		4.700 12.933 (94)	41.066	
196	Suzanne Buttigieg	Malta	4.200 12.766 (209)	1	4.500 10.100 (214)	3.800 11.133 (220)	40.999	
197	Anne Kuhm	France	5.000 13.933 (97)	5.200 13.600 (40)	5.100 13.366 (52)		40.899	
198	Pauline Tratz	Germany	5.000 14.133 (63)		4.400 12.833 (82)	5.300 13.500 (50)	40.466	
198	Hebatallah Serry	Morocco	4.200 12.500 (224)	3.2	3.7 9.900 (218)	3.800 10.066 (229)	40.466	
200	Brenna Dowell	United States	5.800 15.100 (8)	5.900 11.333 (157)		5.800 13.966 (23)	40.399	
201	Lisa Top	Netherlands	5.300 14.300 (52)		5.000 12.333 (113)	5.500 13.700 (39)	40.333	
202	Eum Da-yeon	South Korea	5.000 13.833 (117)	5.500 13.533 (44)	4.900 12.700 (94)		40.066	
203	Yun Na-rae	South Korea	5.000 14.033 (77)		5.200 13.383 (51)	5.300 12.633 (125)	40.049	
204	Thauany Araújo	Brazil	5.000 14.166 (60)	5.500 12.800 (86)	5.400 12.800 (88)		39.766	
204	Lee Hye-been	South Korea	5.000 14.000 (80)	5.600 12.666 (92)		5.300 13.100 (80)	39.766	
206	Nora Fernández	Spain	5.000 14.100 (68)		5.200 13.200 (65)	5.200 12.366 (154)	39.666	
207	Audrey Rousseau	Canada		5.500 13.166 (62)	5.200 12.500 (102)	5.200 13.400 (59)	39.066	
208	Marcela Torres	Sweden	5.200 13.866 (107)	4.500 12.033 (120)		4.700 12.766 (109)	38.665	
209	Vasiliki Millousi	Greece		5.000 13.066 (65)	5.900 13.766 (31)	4.700 11.633 (201)	38.465	
210	Leah Griesser	Germany		5.500 13.200 (59)	5.100 12.433 (107)	5.200 12.766 (114)	38.399	
211	Laura Schulte	Switzerland	5.000 13.866 (107)	5.300 11.400 (152)		5.000 12.900 (99)	38.166	
212	Enikő Horváth	Hungary	5.000 13.666 (150)		4.700 11.733 (146)	4.700 12.766 (109)	38.165	
213	Mary-Anne Monckton	Australia	5.000 13.800 (123)	5.400 11.933 (125)	5.700 12.200 (124)		37.933	
214	Nicole Hitz	Switzerland	4.600 12.966 (192)		4.700 11.833 (141)	5.100 13.100 (81)	37.899	
215	Batmaa Enkhtuvshin	Mongolia	4.200 12.433 (225)	3.2 7.200 (229)	4.000 9.266 (228)	3.3 8.900 (233)	37.799	
216	Andreea Iridon	Romania		5.700 11.900 (129)	5.600 13.500 (46)	5.100 12.300 (162)	37.7	
217	Evangelia Monokrousou	Greece	5.000 13.366 (170)		4.400 11.866 (139)	4.800 12.433 (145)	37.665	
218	Caterina Barloggio	Switzerland		5.100 11.633 (139)	5.100 13.333 (54)	4.800 12.500 (136)	37.466	
219	Jessica Diacci	Switzerland	5.000 13.566 (161)	5.200 11.266 (160)	5.200 12.600 (97)		37.432	
220	Najwa Dassalm	Morocco	4.400 13.033 (189)	7.200 (228)	3.2 6.533 (233)	4.2 9.766 (231)	36.532	
221	Ece Ayan	Sweden		5.300 11.466 (149)	4.900 12.000 (133)	4.900 12.900 (98)	36.366	
222	Kianna Dean	Bahamas	4.200 12.700 (214)	6.166 (232)	2.5 7.566 (231)	3 9.766 (230)	36.198	
223	Dianne Soria	Bolivia	4.000 11.466 (230)	7.100 (230)	3.5 7.300 (232)	3.500 10.066 (228)	35.932	
224	Park Ji-soo	South Korea		4.700 10.666 (183)	5.700 12.466 (105)	5.300 12.766 (113)	35.898	
225	Milla Fabre	Monaco	4.200 12.633 (217)	3.633 (237)	4.300 10.133 (212)	2.7 9.266 (232)	35.665	
226	Katja Serrer	Namibia	4.000 12.366 (226)	6.000 (233)	2.7 9.483 (226)	3.1 7.700 (235)	35.549	
227	Kitti Honti	Hungary		5.300 12.400 (103)	4.700 10.600 (202)	4.600 12.333 (156)	35.333	
228	Carmen Horvat	Slovenia		4.000 10.700 (181)	4.200 11.933 (137)	3.800 11.866 (188)	34.499	
229	Olivia Jochum	Austria		4.100 10.866 (175)	4.600 10.933 (186)	4.400 12.100 (178)	33.899	
229	Kabuba Masule	Namibia	2.400 10.933 (231)	5.700 (234)	2.1 8.600 (230)	2.4 8.666 (234)	33.899	
231	Simone Hall	Bahamas	4.700 13.300 (173)	7.700 (226)		4.200 10.633 (226)	31.633	
232	Sofía Rodríguez	Uruguay	0 0.000 (232)	8.500 (222)	4.300 10.741 (195)	4.400 11.000 (224)	30.241	
233	Sae Miyakawa	Japan	6.200 14.900 (17)			6.300 14.900 (2)	29.8	
234	Ksenia Afanasyeva	Russia	5.800 14.866 (21)			6.100 14.633 (4)	29.499	
235	Madison Kocian	United States		6.600 15.233 (3)	5.500 14.000 (18)		29.233	
236	Sanne Wevers	Netherlands		5.600 14.100 (18)	5.900 14.766 (2)		28.866	
237	Fan Yilin	China		6.800 14.966 (5)	6.100 13.833 (28)		28.799	
238	Larrissa Miller	Australia		6.100 14.166 (15)		5.400 13.500 (52)	27.666	
239	Becky Downie	United Kingdom		6.600 13.500 (47)	5.600 14.100 (15)		27.6	
240	Mao Yi	China	5.800 14.766 (30)			5.600 12.500 (142)	27.266	
241	Claire Martin	France			5.700 13.466 (48)	5.300 13.766 (34)	27.232	
242	Veronica Wagner	Sweden	4.600 13.700 (143)		5.100 13.333 (54)		27.033	
243	Sydney Townsend	Canada	5.300 14.333 (51)			5.200 12.500 (139)	26.833	
244	Aiko Sugihara	Japan		5.900 13.966 (25)	5.000 12.800 (86)		26.766	
245	Boglárka Dévai	Hungary	5.800 14.858 (25)	5.100 11.866 (131)			26.724	
246	Lisa Katharina Hill	Germany	5.000 13.933 (97)	6.500 12.766 (89)			26.699	
247	Claudia Chmielowska	Poland	5.000 13.866 (107)			4.900 12.533 (133)	26.399	
248	Lara Mori	Italy		5.500 12.400 (104)	5.200 13.733 (32)		26.133	
249	Ahtziri Sandoval	Mexico	5.200 12.666 (216)	5.800 13.200 (60)			25.866	
250	Ayelén Tarabini	Argentina			5.400 13.366 (53)	5.200 11.000 (225)	24.366	
251	Morgan Lloyd	Cayman Islands	0 0.000 (232)	3.8	2.400 10.033 (216)	2.900 10.333 (227)	24.166	
252	Peppijna Dalli	Malta	4.200 12.833 (205)	2.700 9.533 (209)			22.366	
253	Melba Avendaño	Colombia	5.000 13.866 (107)				13.866	
254	Julie Croket	Belgium			5.200 12.800 (87)		12.800	
255	Roxana Popa	Spain		5.900 12.766 (88)			12.766	
256	Letícia Costa	Brazil				5.500 12.433 (147)	12.433	
257	Michelle Lauritsen	Denmark		4.600 12.100 (117)			12.100	
258	Klara Kopeć	Poland			4.600 11.400 (167)		11.400	
259	Maria Simou	Greece		4.700 11.166 (164)			11.166	
260	Maya Williams	Jamaica			4.500 10.133 (213)		10.133	
261	Annelise Koster	Namibia		2.200 4.133 (235)			4.133	

== Vault ==
Rank	Gymnast	Nation	D Score	E Score	Pen.	Score 1	D Score	E Score	Pen.	Score 2	Total	Qual.
Rank	Gymnast	Nation	Vault 1				Vault 2				Total	Qual.
1	Simone Biles	United States	6.300	9.700		16.000	5.600	9.666		15.266	15.633	Q
2	Maria Paseka	Russia	6.400	9.100		15.500	6.300	9.366		15.666	15.583	Q
3	Hong Un-jong	North Korea	6.300	9.266		15.566	6.400	9.100		15.500	15.533	Q
4	Giulia Steingruber	Switzerland	6.200	9.300		15.500	5.800	9.333		15.133	15.316	Q
5	Wang Yan	China	6.000	9.066		15.066	6.200	8.933		15.133	15.099	Q
6	Ellie Downie	Great Britain	5.800	9.266		15.066	5.600	9.233		14.833	14.949	Q
7	Dipa Karmakar	India	7.000	8.100		15.100	6.000	8.700		14.700	14.900	Q
8	Alexa Moreno	Mexico	6.200	8.833		15.033	6.000	8.766		14.766	14.899	Q
9	Seda Tutkhalyan	Russia	5.800	9.100		14.900	5.600	9.133		14.733	14.816	R
10	Brittany Rogers	Canada	5.800	9.200		15.000	5.600	8.933		14.533	14.766	R
11	Paula Mejías	Puerto Rico	6.000	8.900		14.900	5.700	8.800		14.500	14.700	R

== Uneven bars ==
Rank	Gymnast	Nation	D Score	E Score	Pen.	Total	Qual.
1	Daria Spiridonova	Russia	6.700	8.766		15.466	Q
2	Viktoria Komova	Russia	6.500	8.800		15.300	Q
3	Madison Kocian	United States	6.600	8.633		15.233	Q
4	Sophie Scheder	Germany	6.600	8.433		15.033	Q
5	Fan Yilin	China	6.800	8.166		14.966	Q
6	Maria Paseka	Russia	6.100	8.700		14.800	–
7	Gabby Douglas	United States	6.200	8.550		14.750	Q
8	Simone Biles	United States	6.100	8.566		14.666	–
9	Ruby Harrold	Great Britain	6.300	8.366		14.666	Q
10	Shang Chunsong	China	6.500	8.166		14.666	Q
11	Loan His	France	6.100	8.366		14.466	R
12	Lieke Wevers	Netherlands	6.000	8.400		14.400	R
13	Maria Kharenkova	Russia	5.800	8.541		14.341	–
14	Noémi Makra	Hungary	6.100	8.133		14.233	R

== Balance beam ==
Rank	Gymnast	Nation	D Score	E Score	Pen.	Total	Qual.
1	Simone Biles	United States	6.300	8.666		14.966	Q
2	Sanne Wevers	Netherlands	5.900	8.866		14.766	Q
3	Ellie Black	Canada	6.400	8.200		14.600	Q
4	Viktoria Komova	Russia	5.700	8.833		14.533	Q
5	Seda Tutkhalyan	Russia	6.300	8.233		14.533	Q
6	Wang Yan	China	6.300	8.200		14.500	Q
7	Maria Kharenkova	Russia	5.900	8.466		14.366	—
8	Pauline Schäfer	Germany	5.800	8.500		14.300	Q
9	Eythora Thorsdottir	Netherlands	5.600	8.633		14.233	Q
10	Carlotta Ferlito	Italy	5.700	8.533		14.233	R
11	Lieke Wevers	Netherlands	5.700	8.533		14.233	—
12	Jade Barbosa	Brazil	5.700	8.500		14.200	R
13	Maggie Nichols	United States	5.800	8.366		14.166	R

== Floor exercise ==
Rank	Gymnast	Nation	D Score	E Score	Pen.	Total	Qual.				
Rank	Gymnast	Nation	1	Simone Biles	United States	Total	Qual.	6.900	9.066	15.966	Q
2	Sae Miyakawa	Japan	6.300	8.600		14.900	Q				
3	Maggie Nichols	United States	6.200	8.500		14.700	Q				
4	Ksenia Afanasyeva	Russia	6.100	8.533		14.633	Q				
5	Claudia Fragapane	Great Britain	6.300	8.300		14.600	Q				
6	Giulia Steingruber	Switzerland	6.000	8.533		14.533	Q				
7	Aly Raisman	United States	6.600	8.233	-0.3	14.533	—				
8	Erika Fasana	Italy	6.000	8.466		14.466	Q				
9	Gabby Douglas	United States	5.900	8.500		14.400	—				
10	Ellie Downie	Great Britain	6.000	8.400		14.400	Q				
11	Shang Chunsong	China	6.400	8.000		14.400	R				
12	Lieke Wevers	Netherlands	5.600	8.600		14.200	R				
13	Amy Tinkler	Great Britain	6.000	8.200		14.200	—				
14	Wang Yan	China	6.200	8.000		14.200	R				
