= 2013 World Artistic Gymnastics Championships – Women's qualification =

This page lists the women's qualification results of the 2013 World Artistic Gymnastics Championships.

== Total qualified by country ==
Rank	Nation	AA		V		UB		BB		FX		Total	
Rank	Nation	Q	R	Q	R	Q	R	Q	R	Q	R	Q	R
1	United States	2		2		2		2		2		10	
2	Russia	2			1	1	1	2				5	2
3	China	2				2		1	1			5	1
4	Italy	2						2		1		5	
5	Great Britain	2				2						4	
5	Switzerland	2		1						1		4	
5	Romania	1						1		2		4	
8	Canada	2			1					1		3	1
8	Japan	2					1			1		3	1
10	Germany	1				1	1					2	1
10	Netherlands	1		1							1	2	1
12	Belgium	2										2	
13	Hungary	1	1								1	1	2
14	Venezuela	1									1	1	1
15	Spain	1										1	
15	Dominican Republic			1								1	
15	North Korea			1								1	
15	Uzbekistan			1								1	
15	Vietnam			1								1	
20	Brazil		1						1				2
21	Greece		1										1
21	Portugal		1										1
21	Slovenia				1								1
21	Ukraine								1				1

== Individual all-around ==
Rank	Gymnast	Nation	Vault (gymnastics)	Uneven bars	Balance beam	Floor (gymnastics)	Total	Qual.
1	Simone Biles	United States	15.900	14.800	14.400	15.033	60.133	Q
2	Kyla Ross	United States	15.166	15.133	14.566	14.333	59.198	Q
3	Yao Jinnan	China	14.766	15.433	14.100	13.666	57.965	Q
4	Larisa Iordache	Romania	14.933	13.166	15.266	14.500	57.865	Q
5	Aliya Mustafina	Russia	14.966	14.900	14.133	13.166	57.165	Q
6	McKayla Maroney	United States	15.850	14.300	12.666	14.333	57.149	-
7	Shang Chunsong	China	13.966	14.400	14.866	13.766	56.998	Q
8	Vanessa Ferrari	Italy	14.366	13.833	14.216	14.500	56.915	Q
9	Giulia Steingruber	Switzerland	15.366	13.233	13.833	14.033	56.465	Q
10	Elsabeth Black	Canada	14.266	13.366	13.833	14.000	55.465	Q
11	Roxana Popa	Spain	14.866	13.900	12.966	13.600	55.332	Q
12	Jessica López	Venezuela	14.733	13.433	13.133	13.766	55.065	Q
13	Noël van Klaveren	Netherlands	14.400	12.966	13.700	13.933	54.999	Q
14	Carlotta Ferlito	Italy	13.866	13.400	14.216	13.466	54.948	Q
15	Victoria Moors	Canada	14.766	13.166	13.366	13.500	54.798	Q
16	Anna Rodionova	Russia	13.933	13.800	14.466	12.400	54.599	Q
17	Ruby Harrold	Great Britain	13.766	14.600	12.600	13.266	54.232	Q
18	Natsumi Sasada	Japan	14.033	14.100	12.933	13.100	54.166	Q
19	Rebecca Tunney	Great Britain	14.866	13.600	12.200	13.466	54.132	Q
20	Noémi Makra	Hungary	13.741	13.566	12.633	13.966	53.906	Q
21	Gaelle Mys	Belgium	13.766	13.033	13.700	13.166	53.665	Q
22	Laura Waem	Belgium	13.900	13.533	13.433	12.766	53.632	Q
23	Elisabeth Seitz	Germany	14.400	14.266	12.433	12.433	53.532	Q
24	Asuka Teramoto	Japan	13.866	13.033	12.683	13.600	53.182	Q
25	Ilaria Käslin	Switzerland	13.966	12.666	13.733	12.766	53.131	Q
26	Vasiliki Millousi	Greece	13.100	13.300	13.833	12.800	53.033	R
27	Ana Filipa Martins	Portugal	13.233	13.533	13.166	12.900	52.832	R
28	Leticia Costa	Brazil	14.300	12.466	13.533	12.366	52.665	R
29	Dorina Böczögő	Hungary	13.666	13.033	13.066	12.733	52.498	R
30	Kristýna Pálešová	Czech Republic	13.766 (50)	13.733 (19)	12.766 (36)	12.066 (62)	52.331	
31	Silvia Colussi	Spain	14.000 (32)	12.833 (42)	12.900 (35)	12.433 (46)	52.166	
32	Ida Gustafsson	Sweden	13.866 (44)	12.541 (49)	12.633 (41)	13.100 (27)	52.14	
33	Sophie Scheder	Germany	14.166 (28)	14.566 (8)	10.966 (87)	12.433 (44)	52.131	
34	Sung Ji-hye	South Korea	13.066 (86)	13.933 (14)	12.366 (51)	12.700 (40)	52.065	
35	Chantysha Netteb	Netherlands	14.833 (13)	12.108 (58)	11.966 (66)	12.933 (30)	51.840	
36	Lisa Verschueren	Belgium	13.700 (58)	13.200 (32)	12.966 (33)	11.733 (77)	51.599	
37	Angelina Kysla	Ukraine	13.900 (40)	13.500 (24)	11.000 (86)	13.100 (29)	51.5	
38	Ivet Rojas	Venezuela	13.900 (40)	13.433 (25)	12.466 (46)	11.633 (80)	51.432	
39	Barbora Mokošová	Slovakia	13.400 (68)	12.000 (62)	13.266 (26)	12.333 (50)	50.999	
40	Elisa Hämmerle	Austria	13.966 (34)	12.741 (44)	11.700 (69)	12.366 (48)	50.773	
41	Marta Pihan-Kulesza	Poland	12.266 (102)	13.266 (30)	13.066 (30)	12.033 (68)	50.631	
42	Nadia Mülhauser	Switzerland	13.900 (40)	12.500 (50)	12.000 (65)	12.033 (66)	50.433	
43	Kirsten Beckett	South Africa	13.466 (66)	12.600 (46)	12.366 (50)	11.900 (71)	50.332	
44	Cintia Rodríguez	Spain	13.200 (80)	12.566 (48)	11.400 (75)	13.100 (26)	50.266	
45	Toni-Ann Williams	Jamaica	13.933 (38)	11.133 (77)	12.433 (49)	12.766 (37)	50.265	
46	Marcela Sandoval	Colombia	13.233 (76)	12.758 (43)	12.033 (61)	12.133 (59)	50.157	
47	Lisa Ecker	Austria	13.833 (49)	12.466 (52)	11.600 (73)	11.700 (78)	49.599	
48	Dilnoza Abdusalimova	Uzbekistan	13.266 (74)	12.066 (60)	11.966 (67)	12.200 (55)	49.498	
49	Yamilet Peña	Dominican Republic	14.900 (9)	11.933 (64)	11.200 (80)	11.366 (88)	49.399	
50	Marisa Dick	Trinidad and Tobago	13.633 (61)	12.066 (59)	12.733 (38)	10.800 (100)	49.232	
51	Karla Torres	Mexico	13.766 (50)	11.666 (70)	12.033 (62)	11.433 (87)	48.898	
52	Mira Boumejmajen	France	13.183 (82)	12.266 (55)	11.200 (81)	12.166 (57)	48.815	
53	Mette Hulgaard	Denmark	13.400 (68)	11.291 (75)	12.000 (64)	12.033 (67)	48.724	
54	Zhanerke Duisek	Kazakhstan	13.008 (88)	11.100 (78)	12.966 (32)	11.466 (86)	48.54	
55	Nicolette Lim	Singapore	4.400 13.133 ﴾83﴿	?	?	?	48.533	
56	Farida Ahmed Shokry	Egypt	4.400 13.366 ﴾71﴿	?	?	?	48.531	
57	Park Ji-soo	South Korea	5.000 13.233 ﴾76﴿	?	?	?	48.523	
58	Catalina Escobar	Colombia	5.800 14.500 ﴾21﴿	?	?	?	47.799	
59	Heem Wei Lim	Singapore	4.600 13.066 ﴾86﴿	?	?	?	47.331	
60	Jasmin Mader	Austria	5.000 13.266 ﴾74﴿	?	?	?	47.265	
61	Mariana Sanchez Reid	Costa Rica	4.400 12.333 ﴾101﴿	?	?	?	47.182	
62	Rosanna Ojala	Finland	4.600 13.375 ﴾70﴿	?	?	?	46.907	
63	Dipa Karmakar	India	5.000 13.866 ﴾44﴿	?	?	?	46.648	
64	Mathilde Kirk	Denmark	4.400 12.833 ﴾94﴿	?	?	?	45.923	
65	Demet Mutlu	Turkey	5.000 13.600 ﴾62﴿	?	?	?	45.858	
66	Claudia Cummins	South Africa	5.000 13.100 ﴾84﴿	?	?	?	45.799	
67	India McPeak	Ireland	4.200 12.566 ﴾98﴿	?	?	?	45.798	
68	Agnes Suto	Iceland	4.000 12.466 ﴾100﴿	?	?	?	45.565	
69	Alice Jáňová	Czech Republic	4.000 11.266 ﴾105﴿	?	?	?	45.531	
70	Haldis Naerum	Norway	4.200 12.700 ﴾97﴿	?	?	?	45.5	
71	Chen Yu-chun	Chinese Taipei	5.000 13.500 ﴾65﴿	?	?	?	45.499	
72	Nicole Szabo	South Africa	4.000 11.600 ﴾104﴿	?	?	?	45.499	
73	Karina Regidor	Costa Rica	4.600 13.233 ﴾76﴿	?	?	?	45.274	
74	Ng Yan Yin	Hong Kong	4.900 12.900 ﴾90﴿	?	?	?	44.174	
75	Lo Yu-ju	Chinese Taipei	5.000 13.741 ﴾56﴿	?	?	?	44.04	
76	Shaked Malec	Israel	5.000 13.600 ﴾62﴿	?	?	?	43.932	
77	Valentina Rashkova	Bulgaria	4.000 12.233 ﴾103﴿	?	?	?	43.766	
78	Nicole Mawhinney	Ireland	4.200 12.566 ﴾98﴿	?	?	?	43.49	
79	Norma Róbertsdóttir	Iceland	5.000 13.300 ﴾73﴿	?	?	?	43.299	
80	Ayana Lee	Jamaica	4.800 12.900 ﴾90﴿	?	?	?	42.099	
81	Alessia Leolini	Italy	5.000 13.866 ﴾44﴿	?	?	?	39.023	
82	Valentine Sabatou	France	0	?	?	?	37.665	
83	Laura Švilpaitė	Lithuania	4.400 13.416 ﴾67﴿	?	?	?	37.049	
84	Teja Belak	Slovenia	5.800 14.566 ﴾18﴿	?	?	?	36.932	
85	Paula Plichta	Poland	5.000 14.100 ﴾29﴿	?	?	?	35.799	
86	Martina Castro	Chile	5.200 13.766 ﴾50﴿	?	?	?	34.932	
87	Aruna Budda Reddy	India	4.400 13.200 ﴾80﴿	?	?	?	33.566	
88	Shaden Wohdan	Qatar	4.400 12.766 ﴾95﴿	?	8.066 ﴾88﴿	10.866 ﴾88﴿	31.698	
89	Rucha Divekar	India	4.200 12.733 ﴾96﴿	?	?	?	31.457	
90	Tatiana Nabieva	Russia	5.800 14.633 ﴾17﴿	?	?	?	29.166	
91	Mai Murakami	Japan	5.800 14.558 ﴾20﴿	?	?	14.466 ﴾5﴿	29.024	
92	Rebecca Downie	United Kingdom		?	15.100 ﴾4﴿	?	28.7	
93	Hong Un-jong	North Korea	6.300 15.633 ﴾3﴿	?	?	?	27.649	
94	Krystyna Sankova	Ukraine		?	?	?	27.566	
95	Pauline Schäfer	Germany	5.200 14.033 ﴾30﴿	?	?	?	26.933	
96	Maegan Chant	Canada	5.500 13.366 ﴾71﴿	?	?	?	26.699	
97	Makarena Pinto	Chile	5.200 14.000 ﴾32﴿	?	?	?	26.633	
98	Kaitlyn Hofland	Canada		?	?	?	26.533	
99	Valērija Grišāne	Latvia	5.200 13.766 ﴾50﴿	?	?	?	26.232	
100	Olena Vasylieva	Ukraine		?	?	?	26.133	
101	Yu Minobe	Japan		?	?	?	25.899	
102	Daria Matveieva	Ukraine	5.000 13.600 ﴾62﴿	?	?	?	25.891	
103	Nicolle Vazquez Avilés	Puerto Rico	5.300 13.966 ﴾34﴿	?	?	?	25.832	
104	Çağla Akyol	Germany		?	?	?	25.5	
105	Phan Thị Hà Thanh	Vietnam	5.800 14.866 ﴾10﴿	?	?	?	25.366	
106	Fadwa Mohamed Mahmoud	Egypt	7.000 14.566 ﴾18﴿	?	?	?	25.299	
107	Michelle Lauritsen	Denmark	4.800 13.000 ﴾89﴿	?	?	?	25.2	
108	Ștefania Stănilă	Romania		?	?	?	24.966	
109	Vera van Pol	Netherlands		?	?	?	24.832	
110	Emma Lunn	Ireland		?	?	?	24.799	
111	Anna Geidt	Kazakhstan	4.600 12.866 ﴾92﴿	?	?	?	24.732	
111	Daniele Hypólito	Brazil		?	?	?	24.732	
113	Paula Mejías	Puerto Rico	5.500 12.866 ﴾92﴿	?	?	?	24.199	
114	Ginna Escobar	Colombia		?	?	?	24	
115	Ekaterina Kislinskaya	Portugal		?	?	?	23.699	
116	Melany Cabrera	Chile		?	?	?	23.533	
117	Inna Vassilyeva	Kazakhstan		11.800 (67)	11.700 (68)		23.5	
118	Tinna Óðinsdóttir	Iceland		10.633 (86)	12.066 (59)		22.699	
119	Alexandra Choon	Portugal			10.700 (91)	11.733 (76)	22.433	
120	Sarah El Dabagh	Denmark			9.633 (105)	11.500 (84)	21.133	
121	Huang Huidan	China		15.133 (3)			15.133	
122	Oksana Chusovitina	Uzbekistan	15.000 (6)				15.000	
123	Sandra Izbaşa	Romania				14.733 (2)	14.733	
124	Ofir Netzer	Israel	14.300 (25)				14.3	
125	Francesca Deagostini	Italy			13.908 (11)		13.908	
126	Zeng Siqi	China			13.900 (12)		13.9	
127	Hiu Ying Angel Wong	Hong Kong	13.700 ﴾58﴿				13.7	
128	Hannah Whelan	United Kingdom				13.366 (21)	13.366	
129	Sanne Wevers	Netherlands			12.233 (56)		12.233	
130	Mai Ahmed Saad	Egypt		11.700 (69)			11.7	
131	Evangelia Plyta	Greece		11.466 (72)			11.466	
132	Nancy Mohamed Taman	Egypt			11.166 (82)		11.166	
133	Karina Hube	Chile		9.975 (94)			9.975	
134	Vandita Nilesh Raval	India		8.166 (101)			8.166	

== Vault ==
Rank	Gymnast	Nation	D Score	E Score	Pen.	Score 1	D Score	E Score	Pen.	Score 2	Total	Qual.
Rank	Gymnast	Nation	Vault 1				Vault 2				Total	Qual.
1	McKayla Maroney	United States	6.300	9.550		15.850	6.000	9.433		15.433	15.641	Q
2	Simone Biles	United States	6.300	9.600		15.900	5.600	9.600		15.200	15.550	Q
3	Hong Un-jong	North Korea	6.300	9.333		15.633	6.400	8.566	0.1	14.866	15.249	Q
4	Phan Thị Hà Thanh	Vietnam	5.800	9.066		14.866	6.200	8.866		15.066	14.966	Q
5	Giulia Steingruber	Switzerland	6.200	9.166		15.366	5.000	9.233		14.233	14.799	Q
6	Oksana Chusovitina	Uzbekistan	6.200	8.800		15.000	5.500	9.100	0.1	14.500	14.750	Q
7	Yamilet Peña	Dominican Republic	7.000	7.900		14.900	5.800	8.666		14.466	14.683	Q
8	Chantysha Netteb	Netherlands	5.800	9.133	0.1	14.833	5.200	9.000		14.200	14.516	Q
9	Ellie Black	Canada	6.000	8.366	0.1	14.266	6.200	8.400	0.1	14.500	14.383	R
10	Aliya Mustafina	Russia	5.800	9.166		14.966	6.000	7.766		13.766	14.366	R
11	Teja Belak	Slovenia	5.800	8.766		14.566	5.300	8.866		14.166	14.366	R

== Uneven bars ==
Rank	Gymnast	Nation	D Score	E Score	Pen.	Total	Qual.
1	Yao Jinnan	China	6.700	8.733		15.433	Q
2	Kyla Ross	United States	6.400	8.733		15.133	Q
3	Huang Huidan	China	6.600	8.533		15.133	Q
4	Becky Downie	Great Britain	6.600	8.500		15.100	Q
5	Aliya Mustafina	Russia	6.200	8.700		14.900	Q
6	Simone Biles	United States	6.000	8.800		14.800	Q
7	Ruby Harrold	Great Britain	6.300	8.300		14.600	Q
8	Sophie Scheder	Germany	6.400	8.166		14.566	Q
9	Tatiana Nabieva	Russia	6.000	8.533		14.533	R
10	Shang Chunsong	China	6.300	8.100		14.400	-
11	McKayla Maroney	United States	5.900	8.400		14.300	-
12	Elisabeth Seitz	Germany	6.300	7.966		14.266	R
13	Natsumi Sasada	Japan	5.900	8.200		14.100	R

== Balance beam ==
Rank	Gymnast	Nation	D Score	E Score	Pen.	Total	Qual.
1	Larisa Iordache	Romania	6.400	8.866		15.266	Q
2	Shang Chunsong	China	6.100	8.766		14.866	Q
3	Kyla Ross	United States	5.900	8.666		14.566	Q
4	Anna Rodionova	Russia	5.900	8.566		14.466	Q
5	Simone Biles	United States	6.100	8.300		14.400	Q
6	Vanessa Ferrari	Italy	5.700	8.516		14.216	Q
7	Carlotta Ferlito	Italy	6.200	8.016		14.216	Q
8	Aliya Mustafina	Russia	6.000	8.133		14.133	Q
9	Yao Jinnan	China	6.400	7.700		14.100	R
10	Krystyna Sankova	Ukraine	6.100	7.900		14.000	R
11	Francesca Deagostini	Italy	5.800	8.108		13.908	-
12	Zeng Siqi	China	6.500	7.400		13.900	-
13	Daniele Hypólito	Brazil	6.300	7.566		13.866	R

== Floor exercise ==
Rank	Gymnast	Nation	D Score	E Score	Pen.	Total	Qual.
1	Simone Biles	United States	6.500	8.533		15.033	Q
2	Sandra Izbașa	Romania	6.200	8.533		14.733	Q
3	Larisa Iordache	Romania	6.100	8.400		14.500	Q
4	Vanessa Ferrari	Italy	6.300	8.200		14.500	Q
5	Mai Murakami	Japan	6.300	8.166		14.466	Q
6	Kyla Ross	United States	5.700	8.633		14.333	Q
7	McKayla Maroney	United States	6.100	8.333	0.1	14.333	-
8	Giulia Steingruber	Switzerland	6.100	8.033	0.1	14.033	Q
9	Ellie Black	Canada	5.800	8.200		14.000	Q
10	Noémi Makra	Hungary	6.000	7.966		13.966	R
11	Noël van Klaveren	Netherlands	5.600	8.333		13.933	R
12	Jessica López	Venezuela	5.300	8.466		13.766	R
