= Klara Kopeć =

Polish artistic gymnast

- Full name: Klara Stefania Kopeć
- Born: 12 August 1999 (age 27) Kraków, Poland

Gymnastics career
- Discipline: Women's artistic gymnastics
- Country represented: Poland
- Club: TS Wisla Krakow

Klara Stefania Kopeć (born 12 August 1999) is a Polish artistic gymnast.

== Career ==
Kopeć competed at the 2014 Junior European Championships with Maria Bieda and Wiktoria Łopuszańska where they finished 21st.

Kopeć made her senior debut at the 2015 Polish International where she won the silver on the balance beam behind Katarzyna Jurkowska-Kowalska. She competed at the Barborka Cup, and the Polish team won the gold medal ahead of the Czech Republic and Latvia. She then competed at the 2015 World Championships with Gabriela Janik, Katarzyna Jurkowska-Kowalska, Claudia Chmielowska, Alma Kuc, and Marta Pihan-Kulesza, and the team finished 19th in the qualification round.

At the 2016 Polish Championships, Kopeć won the silver medal on the balance beam behind Katarzyna Jurkowska-Kowalska. She then competed at the 2016 European Championships alongside Jurkowska-Kowalska, Gabriela Janik, Paula Plichta, and Alma Kuc, and they finished 11th.

She competed at the 2017 Stella Zakharova Cup in Kyiv where she won the bronze medal on the balance beam. At the 2017 Polish Championships, she won the bronze medal on the uneven bars and finished 4th in the all-around. She was initially named to the team for the 2018 European Championships, but she withdrew and was replaced by Marta Pihan-Kulesza.
