= Alma Kuc =

Polish artistic gymnast

- Full name: Alma Alexandra Kuc
- Born: September 21, 1998 (age 27) Toronto, Ontario
- Height: 5 ft 1 in (155 cm)

Gymnastics career
- Discipline: Women's artistic gymnastics
- Country represented: Poland (2013-2017)
- College team: California Golden Bears
- Club: All Olympia Gymnastics Center
- Head coach: Artur Akopyan
- Assistant coaches: Galina Marinova, Marcello Figue

Alma Alexandra Kuc (born September 21, 1998) is a Polish artistic gymnast. She began competing for the California Golden Bears gymnastics team in 2018.

== Personal life ==
Alma Kuc was born on September 21, 1998, in Toronto, Ontario. She has also lived in Argentina and Brazil, and her extended family lives in Poland. Her younger brother, Thomas Kuc, is an actor. She graduated from Laurel Springs High School in Ojai, California. She began attending UC Berkeley in 2017 where she studies Molecular and Cell Biology, and she competes on their gymnastics team.

== Gymnastics career ==
Kuc competed at the 2014 European Championships with Marta Pihan-Kulesza, Katarzyna Jurkowska-Kowalska, Gabriela Janik, Claudia Chmielowska, and the team finished 10th. She then competed at the 2014 World Championships alongside Pihan-Kulesza, Jurkowska-Kowalska, Janik, Chmielowska, and Paula Plichta, and the team finished 17th.

At the 2015 World Championships, Kuc competed with Claudia Chmielowska, Katarzyna Jurkowska-Kowalska, Klara Kopeć, Gabriela Janik, and Marta Pihan-Kulesza, and the team finished 19th. She finished 4th in the all-around and won the gold medal on the uneven bars at the 2016 Polish Championships. Then at the Gym Festival Trnava, she won the silver medal in the all-around behind Hitomi Hatakeda of Japan. She competed at the 2016 European Championships alongside Katarzyna Jurkowska-Kowalska, Klara Kopeć, Gabriela Janik, and Paula Plichta, and they finished 11th. At the 2017 European Championships, Kuc competed only on the uneven bars and finished 18th in the qualification round.
