= Claudia Chmielowska =

Polish artistic gymnast

- Full name: Claudia Anna Chmielowska
- Born: 27 April 1998 (age 28) Łagiewniki, Poland

Gymnastics career
- Discipline: Women's artistic gymnastics
- Country represented: Poland (2014-2016)
- Club: East London Gymnastics

Claudia Anna Chmielowska (born 27 April 1998) is a Polish former artistic gymnast.

== Gymnastics career ==
Chmielowska trained at East London Gymnastics and competed in domestic competitions within Great Britain, but she competed internationally for Poland. At the 2014 English Championships, she finished 18th in the all-around. She competed at the 2014 European Championships with Marta Pihan-Kulesza, Katarzyna Jurkowska-Kowalska, Gabriela Janik, and Alma Kuc, and the team finished 10th. She competed at the 2014 World Championships alongside Pihan-Kulesza, Jurkowska-Kowalska, Janik, Kuc, and Paula Plichta, and the team finished 17th.

Chmielowska competed at the 2015 FIG World Cup in Cottbus and finished 12th on vault and 14th on the floor exercise. She competed at the Barborka Cup, and the Polish team won the gold medal ahead of the Czech Republic and Latvia. She then competed at the 2015 World Championships with Gabriela Janik, Katarzyna Jurkowska-Kowalska, Klara Kopeć, Alma Kuc, and Marta Pihan-Kulesza, and the team finished 19th.

She competed for East London at the 2016 British Team Championships alongside Samanta Katkevica, Georgia-Mae Fenton, and Tyesha Mattis, and they finished 10th.
