= Paula Plichta =

Polish artistic gymnast (born 1991)

- Born: 20 September 1991 (age 34) Olsztyn, Poland
- Height: 154 cm (5 ft 1 in)

Gymnastics career
- Discipline: Women's artistic gymnastics
- Country represented: Poland
- Club: UKS SMS Olsztyn
- Head coach: Przemyslaw Lis

Paula Plichta (born 20 September 1991) is a Polish artistic gymnast.

== Personal life ==
Paula Plichta was born on 20 September 1991, in Olsztyn. In addition to gymnastics, she also competes in CrossFit.

== Gymnastics career ==
Plichta competed at her first World Championships in 2006 alongside Marta Pihan, Joanna Skowrońska, Joanna Litewka, Paula Koza, and Anna Turczyńska, and they finished 21st in the team all-round. Then at the 2007 World Championships, Plitcha competed with Pihan, Litewka, Monika Frandofert, Katarzyna Jurkowska, and Sara Szczawińska, and they finished 22nd in the team all-around.

Plichta won the gold medal on vault at the 2010 FIG World Cup in Osijek. She competed at the 2010 World Championships alongside Gabriela Janik, Marta Pihan-Kulesza, Katarzyna Jurkowska, Monika Frandofert, and Joanna Litewka, and they finished 17th in the team qualification round. She competed at the 2011 World Championships, but she did not qualify for any event finals.

At the 2013 FIG World Cup in Osijek, Plichta finished 7th on vault. She competed at the 2013 World Championships but did not qualify for any event finals. Plichta won the bronze medal on vault behind Janine Berger and Kim Bui at the 2014 Cottbus World Cup. She competed at the 2014 World Championships alongside Claudia Chmielowska, Marta Pihan-Kulesza, Katarzyna Jurkowska-Kowalska, Gabriela Janik, and Alma Kuc, and the team finished 17th.

At the 2015 Cottbus World Cup, Plichta finished 4th on vault. Plichta competed at the 2015 European Games with Katarzyna Jurkowska-Kowalska and Gabriela Janik. Plichta only competed on the uneven bars because she dislocated her elbow during the warm-ups on the vault. The team finished in 11th in the team competition.

At the 2016 Polish Championships, Plichta won the bronze medal in the all-around behind Katarzyna Jurkowska-Kowalska and Gabriela Janik. She competed at the 2016 European Championships alongside Jurkowska-Kowalska, Janik, Klara Kopeć, and Alma Kuc, and they finished 11th.

Plichta has only competed domestically since 2016. She won a bronze medal in the all-around at the 2017 Polish Championships behind Gabriela Janik and Patrycja Dronia. Then at the 2018 Polish Championships, she only competed on the floor exercise, and she won the silver medal behind Janik. At the 2019 Polish Championships she won the silver medal on vault and floor exercise, and she won the bronze medal on balance beam. Then at the 2020 Polish Championships, she won the bronze medal on the floor exercise.

== Eponymous skill ==
Plichta has as uneven bars dismount named after her in the Code of Points.

Apparatus	Name	Description	Difficulty (Note: Valid for the 2025–2028 Code of Points)
Uneven bars	Plichta	Clear straddle circle with salto forward tucked	C (0.3)
