= 2014 Cottbus World Cup =

The 2014 Cottbus World Challenger Cup was a competition held in Cottbus, Germany from March 13–16 in Lausitz Arena. It was a part of the 2014 FIG World Cup Series.

== Medal winners ==
Event	Gold	Silver	Bronze
Men
Floor	Denis Ablyazin (RUS)	Claudio Capelli (SUI)	Diego Hypólito (BRA)
Pommel horse	Kristian Berki (HUN)	Kohei Kameyama (JPN)	Robert Seligman (CRO)
Rings	Denis Ablyazin (RUS)	Eleftherios Petrounias (GRE)	Aleksandr Balandin (RUS); Koji Yamamuro (JPN)
Vault	Tomi Tuuha (FIN)	Diego Hypólito (BRA)	Rayderley Santana (ESP)
Parallel bars	Koji Uematsu (JPN)	Frank Baines (GBR)	Mitja Petkovšek (SLO)
Horizontal bar	Andreas Bretschneider (GER)	Petrix Barbosa (BRA)	Oliver Hegi (SUI)
Women
Vault	Janine Berger (GER)	Kim Bui (GER)	Paula Plichta (POL)
Uneven Bars	Sophie Scheder (GER)	Anna Rodionova (RUS)	Noémi Makra (HUN)
Balance Beam	Noémi Makra (HUN)	Maria Kharenkova (RUS)	Andreea Munteanu (ROU)
Floor	Marta Pihan-Kulesza (POL)	Kim Bui (GER)	Maria Kharenkova (RUS)

== Result ==
=== Women ===
==== Vault ====
Rank	Gymnast	D Score	E Score	Pen.	Total
1st place, gold medalist(s)	Janine Berger (GER)	6.2	9.000		14.712
2nd place, silver medalist(s)	Kim Bui (GER)	5.4	8.975		14.262
3rd place, bronze medalist(s)	Paula Plichta (POL)	5.2	8.950		14.100
4	Noemi Makra (HUN)	5.0	9.000		14.012
5	Kirsten Beckett (RSA)	5.3	8.950		13.987
6	Marina Nekrasova (AZE)	5.0	8.650		13.625
7	Angel Wong Hiu Ying (HKG)	5.2	8.250		13.562
8	Jasmin Mader (AUT)	5.0	8.875		13.425

==== Uneven Bars ====
Rank	Gymnast	D Score	E Score	Pen.	Total
1st place, gold medalist(s)	Sophie Scheder (GER)	6.4	8.525		14.925
2nd place, silver medalist(s)	Anna Rodionova (RUS)	6.0	8.625		14.625
3rd place, bronze medalist(s)	Noémi Makra (HUN)	5.8	8.475		14.275
4	Kim Bui (GER)	6.0	8.125		14.125
5	Natalie Vaculik (CAN)	5.5	8.350		13.850
6	Ana Filipa Martins (POR)	5.3	8.800		13.300
7	Marta Pihan-Kulesza (POL)	5.6	7.625		13.225
8	Aleeza Yu (CAN)	5.1	8.000		13.100

==== Balance Beam ====
Rank	Gymnast	D Score	E Score	Pen.	Total
1st place, gold medalist(s)	Noémi Makra (HUN)	5.6	8.325		13.925
2nd place, silver medalist(s)	Maria Kharenkova (RUS)	5.9	7.950		13.850
3rd place, bronze medalist(s)	Andreea Munteanu (ROU)	6.1	7.650		13.750
4	Sophie Scheder (GER)	5.3	7.950		13.250
5	Katarzyna Jurkowska (POL)	5.2	7.975	0.1	13.075
6	Cagla Akyol (GER)	5.7	7.350		13.050
7	Aleeza Yu (CAN)	5.8	7.025		12.825
8	Natalie Vaculik (CAN)	5.6	6.875		12.475

==== Floor Exercise ====
Rank	Gymnast	D Score	E Score	Pen.	Total
1st place, gold medalist(s)	Marta Pihan-Kulesza (POL)	5.5	8.450		13.950
2nd place, silver medalist(s)	Kim Bui (GER)	5.6	8.325		13.925
3rd place, bronze medalist(s)	Maria Kharenkova (RUS)	5.6	8.250	0.1	13.750
4	Saša Golob (SLO)	5.4	7.850		13.250
5	Andreea Munteanu (ROU)	5.6	7.550		13.150
6	Cagla Akyol (GER)	5.2	7.725	0.1	12.825
7	Aleeza Yu (CAN)	5.4	6.675		12.075
8	Kirsten Beckett (RSA)	5.2	5.875	0.1	10.975
