= Gabriela Sasnal =

Polish artistic gymnast

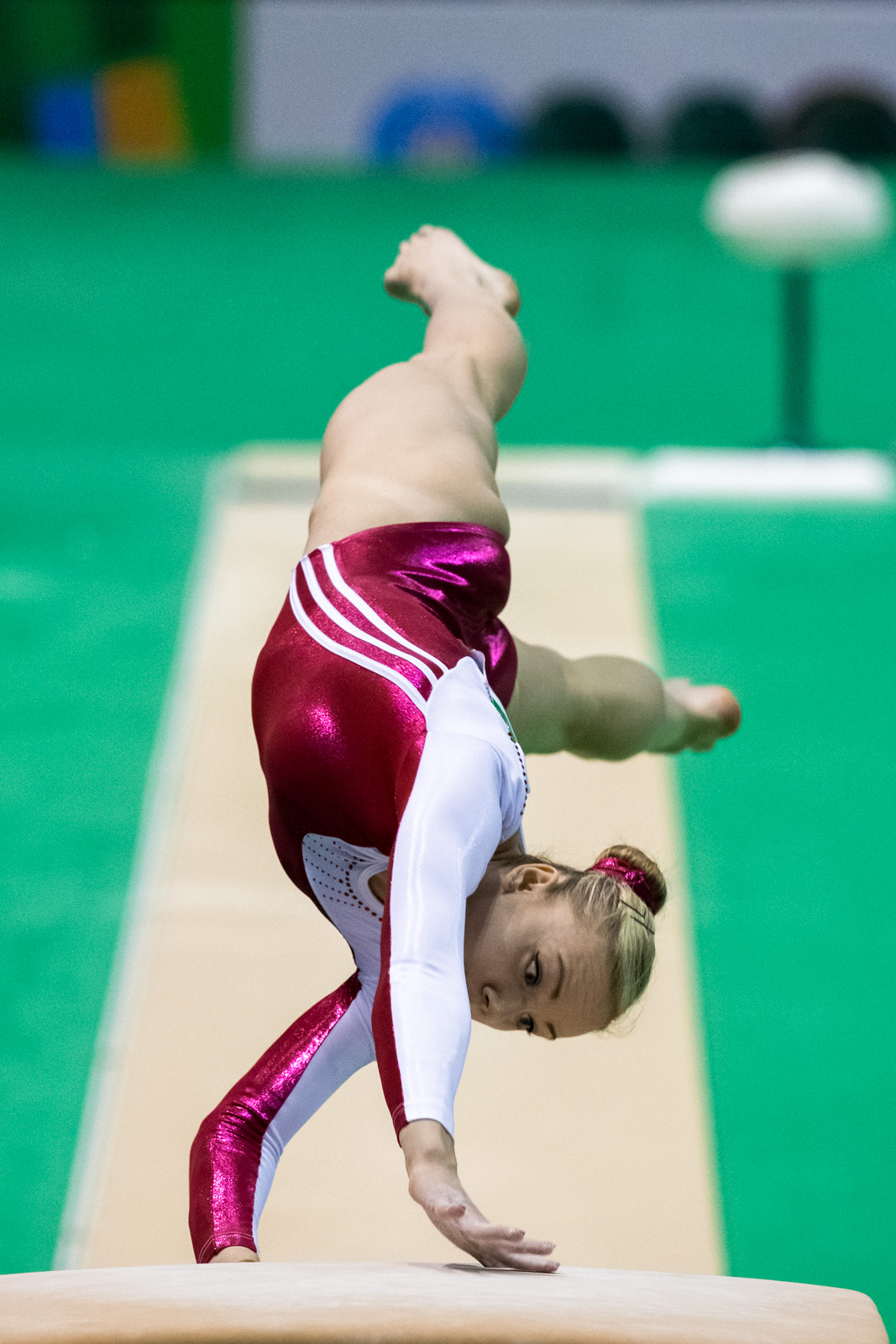
- Sasnal vaulting at the 2016 Gymnastics Olympic Test Event

Personal information
- Full name: Gabriela Weronika Sasnal
- Nicknames: Gabrysia, Gabi
- Born: 10 March 1993 (age 33) Kraków, Poland

Gymnastics career
- Discipline: Women's artistic gymnastics
- Country represented: Poland (2008-present)
- Club: CWZS Zawisza Bydgoszcz
- Head coach: Piotr Mikolajek
Medal record
Representing Poland
FIG World Cup
Event	1st	2nd	3rd
Apparatus World Cup	0	1	1
World Challenge Cup	0	1	2
Total	0	2	3

Gabriela Weronika Sasnal (née Janik; born 10 March 1993) is a Polish artistic gymnast who represented Poland at the 2020 Summer Olympics. She is a five-time medalist on the FIG World Cup series and has competed in six World Championships.

== Personal life ==
Gabriela Janik was born on 10 March 1993, in Kraków. She studied at the University of Technology and Life Sciences in Bydgoszcz. In May 2021, she married fellow artistic gymnast Filip Sasnal.

== Gymnastics career ==
=== 2008-2012 ===
Sasnal competed at the 2008 Junior European Championships and finished seventh in the vault final. She won the silver medal on vault behind teammate Paula Plichta at the 2010 FIG World Cup in Osijek. She made her World Championships debut at the 2010 World Championships alongside Plichta, Marta Pihan-Kulesza, Katarzyna Jurkowska, Monika Frandofert, and Joanna Litewka, and they finished 17th in the team qualification round.

At the 2011 FIG World Cup in Osijek, Sasnal won the bronze medal on vault behind Valeria Maksyuta and Brittany Rogers. She then competed at the 2011 European Championships and finished 29th in the qualification round, which made her the first reserve for the all-around final. She competed at the 2011 World Championships where she finished 72nd in the qualification round. Because Marta Pihan-Kulesza placed higher than her and Poland was only allowed one spot, Sasnal did not qualify for the 2012 Olympic Games. At the 2012 FIG World Cup in Ostrava, Sasnal finished seventh in the vault final and fifth in the uneven bars final.

=== 2014 ===
Sasnal helped the Polish team win the gold medal at the 2014 Austrian Team Open. Then at the International Women meet in Brno, she tied with Elisa Hämmerle for the silver medal in the all-around and won gold with the Polish team. She competed at the 2014 European Championships with Marta Pihan-Kulesza, Katarzyna Jurkowska-Kowalska, Claudia Chmielowska, and Alma Kuc, and the team finished tenth. She then competed at the 2014 World Championships alongside Chmielowska, Pihan-Kulesza, Jurkowska-Kowalska, Kuc, and Paula Plichta, and the team finished 17th. In November 2014, she had shoulder surgery and stopped training for six months to recover.

=== 2015 ===
Sasnal began the 2015 season at the Polish International where she finished fourth in the all-around. In the event finals, she won gold on vault and uneven bars and bronze on balance beam and floor exercise. She competed at the European Games with Katarzyna Jurkowska-Kowalska and Paula Plichta. The team finished 11th in the team competition. Individually, she finished 12th in the all-around final with a total score of 51.532. She finished fourth in the vault final with a score of 13.966. She was a part of the Polish team that finished second at a friendly meet against Hungary and Austria. Then at a friendly meet against the Czech Republic and Latvia, Poland won the gold medal. She then competed at the World Championships with Claudia Chmielowska, Katarzyna Jurkowska-Kowalska, Klara Kopeć, Alma Kuc, and Marta Pihan-Kulesza, and the team finished 19th in the qualification round.

=== 2016 ===
Sasnal began the season at the Austrian Team Open where Poland won the bronze medal behind Switzerland and Hungary. Then at the DTB Team Challenge, the Polish team finished fourth. At the FIG World Challenge Cup in Cottbus, she won the bronze medal on the uneven bars behind Sophie Scheder and Zhu Xiaofang. She then competed at Olympic Test Event and finished 35th in the all-around. Because Poland was only allowed to qualify one spot and Katarzyna Jurkowska-Kowalska placed higher than her, Sasnal did not qualify for the 2016 Olympic Games. Then at the Polish Championships, she finished second behind Jurkowska-Kowalska. She competed at the 2016 European Championships alongside Jurkowska-Kowalska, Klara Kopeć, Alma Kuc, and Paula Plichta, and they finished 11th.

=== 2017 ===
Sasnal began the season at the Polish Senior Cup and won the all-around gold. Then at the Stella Zakharova Cup, she won the gold medal on uneven bars, silver on balance beam behind Hanna Traukova, and bronze on floor exercise. She was the second reserve for the vault event final at the European Championships. At the FIG World Cup in Osijek, she won the bronze medal on the uneven bars behind Anastasia Iliankova and Zsófia Kovács. She swept the gold medals at the Polish Championships. She then competed at the Summer Universiade, and she finished seventh in the all-around final with a total score of 52.050, and she finished fifth in the vault final. At the FIG World Cup in Cottbus, she finished seventh in the vault final.

=== 2018 ===
Sasnal won the all-around gold at the Unni & Haralds Trophy in Oslo. She also won the all-around gold at the Polish Cup. At the FIG World Cup in Guimarães, she won the silver medal on vault behind Yeo Seo-jeong. Then at the Polish Championships, she won the silver medal in the all-around behind Marta Pihan-Kulesza. She then competed at the 2018 European Championships with Katarzyna Jurkowska-Kowalska, Wiktoria Łopuszanska, and Marta Pihan-Kulesza, and the team finished 13th. The same team competed at the World Championships and finished 22nd.

=== 2019 ===
Sasnal began the season at the Doha World Cup where she finished seventh in the vault final. She competed at the European Championships, and she was the second reserve for the all-around final. She then swept the gold medals at the Polish Championships. She competed with a mixed team at the FIT Challenge that finished ninth. At the European Games, she finished 13th in the all-around final with a total of 50.033. Additionally, she finished fourth in the vault final. She finished seventh in the vault final at the Paris World Challenge Cup. At the World Championships, Sasnal finished 79th in the all-around, and she qualified an individual spot for the 2020 Olympic Games.

=== 2021 ===
Sasnal won the all-around silver medal at the Polish Senior Cup behind Marta Pihan-Kulesza. She withdrew from the 2021 European Championships due to an ankle injury. She returned to competition at the FIT Challenge and finished 32nd in the all-around. At the Olympic Games in Tokyo, Sasnal finished 54th in the all-around during the qualification round with a total score of 50.932.

== Competitive history ==
Competitive history of Gabriela Sasnal
Year	Event	Team	AA	VT	UB	BB	FX
2008
2008	Junior European Championships			7			
2010	Osijek World Cup			2nd place, silver medalist(s)			
2010	World Championships	17					
2011	Osijek World Cup			3rd place, bronze medalist(s)			
2011	European Championships		R1				
2011	World Championships		72				
2012	Osijek World Cup			7	5		
2014	Austrian Team Open	1st place, gold medalist(s)					
2014	International Women	1st place, gold medalist(s)	2nd place, silver medalist(s)				
2014	European Championships	10					
2014	World Championships	17					
2015	Polish International		4	1st place, gold medalist(s)	1st place, gold medalist(s)	3rd place, bronze medalist(s)	3rd place, bronze medalist(s)
2015	European Games	11	12	4			
2015	AUT-HUN-POL Friendly	2nd place, silver medalist(s)	5				
2015	Barborka Cup	1st place, gold medalist(s)	3rd place, bronze medalist(s)				
2015	World Championships	19					
2016	Austrian Team Open	3rd place, bronze medalist(s)					
2016	DTB Team Challenge	4					
2016	Cottbus World Challenge Cup			4	3rd place, bronze medalist(s)		
2016	Olympic Test Event		35	6			
2016	Polish Championships		2nd place, silver medalist(s)				
2016	European Championships	11					
2017	Polish Senior Cup		1st place, gold medalist(s)				
2017	Stella Zakharova Cup		10	4	1st place, gold medalist(s)	2nd place, silver medalist(s)	3rd place, bronze medalist(s)
2017	European Championships			R2			
2017	Osijek World Challenge Cup			4	3rd place, bronze medalist(s)		
2017	Polish Championships		1st place, gold medalist(s)	1st place, gold medalist(s)	1st place, gold medalist(s)	1st place, gold medalist(s)	1st place, gold medalist(s)
2017	Summer Universiade		7	5			
2017	Cottbus World Cup			7			
2018	Unni & Haralds Trophy		1st place, gold medalist(s)	1st place, gold medalist(s)	5	3rd place, bronze medalist(s)	4
2018	Polish Cup		1st place, gold medalist(s)				
2018	Guimaraes World Challenge Cup			2nd place, silver medalist(s)	7		
2018	Polish Championships		2nd place, silver medalist(s)	1st place, gold medalist(s)	1st place, gold medalist(s)	3rd place, bronze medalist(s)	1st place, gold medalist(s)
2018	European Championships	13					
2018	World Championships	22					
2019	Doha World Cup			7			
2019	European Championships		R2				
2019	Polish Championships		1st place, gold medalist(s)	1st place, gold medalist(s)	1st place, gold medalist(s)	1st place, gold medalist(s)	1st place, gold medalist(s)
2019	FIT Challenge	9	15				
2019	European Games		13	4			
2019	Paris World Challenge Cup			7			
2019	World Championships		79				
2021	Polish Senior Cup		2nd place, silver medalist(s)				
2021	FIT Challenge		32				
2021	Olympic Games		54				
