= Gymnastics at the 2015 Summer Universiade – Women's balance beam =

Women's balance beam at the 2015 Summer Universiade
- Venue: Gwangju Women's University Universiade Gymnasium
- Date: July 7, 2015
- Competitors: 8 from 7 nations

Medalists
gold medal	Yu Minobe	Japan
silver medal	Polina Fedorova	Russia
bronze medal	Ana Filipa Martins	Portugal

The Women's balance beam Gymnastics at the 2015 Summer Universiade in Gwangju was held on 7 July at the Gwangju Women's University Universiade Gymnasium.

== Schedule ==
All times are Korea Standard Time (UTC+09:00)

Date	Time	Event
Tuesday, 7 July 2015	16:00	Final

== Results ==
Rank	Athlete	Score
1st place, gold medalist(s)	Yu Minobe (JPN)	14.000
2nd place, silver medalist(s)	Polina Fedorova (RUS)	13.733
3rd place, bronze medalist(s)	Ana Filipa Martins (POR)	13.366
4	Dilnoza Abdusalimova (UZB)	13.266
5	Emma Jane Nedov (AUS)	12.733
6	Eum Da-yeon (KOR)	12.333
7	Park Ji-soo (KOR)	11.700
8	Natsumi Sasada (JPN)	10.800
