= Gymnastics at the 2017 Summer Universiade – Women's artistic individual all-around =

Women's artistic individual all-around at the XXIX Summer Universiade
- Venue: Taipei Nangang Exhibition Center, Hall 1, 4F
- Dates: August 22, 2017
- Competitors: 18 from 14 nations

Medalists
| 1st place, gold medalist(s) | | Larisa Iordache | Romania |
| 2nd place, silver medalist(s) | | Asuka Teramoto | Japan |
| 3rd place, bronze medalist(s) | | Ellie Black | Canada |

The women's artistic individual all-around gymnastics event at the 2017 Summer Universiade on August 22 at the Taipei Nangang Exhibition Center, Hall 1, 4F in Taipei, Taiwan.

== Schedule ==
All times are Taiwan Standard Time (UTC+08:00)

| Date | Time | Event |
|---|---|---|
| Tuesday, 22 August 2017 | 18:30 | Final |

== Final results ==
| Rank | Athlete | Vault (gymnastics) | Uneven bars | Balance beam | Floor (gymnastics) | Total |
|---|---|---|---|---|---|---|
| 1st place, gold medalist(s) | Larisa Iordache (ROU) | 14.400 | 14.300 | 14.000 | 14.050 | 56.750 |
| 2nd place, silver medalist(s) | Asuka Teramoto (JPN) | 14.500 | 13.950 | 13.800 | 13.400 | 55.650 |
| 3rd place, bronze medalist(s) | Ellie Black (CAN) | 14.500 | 12.900 | 14.000 | 13.550 | 54.950 |
| 4 | Evgeniya Shelgunova (RUS) | 13.850 | 13.900 | 13.600 | 12.850 | 54.200 |
| 5 | Natsumi Sasada (JPN) | 13.700 | 13.200 | 13.850 | 12.500 | 53.250 |
| 6 | Ana Filipa Martins (POR) | 13.300 | 12.700 | 13.150 | 13.250 | 52.400 |
| 7 | Gabriela Janik (POL) | 13.900 | 13.150 | 12.500 | 12.500 | 52.050 |
| 8 | Daria Spiridonova (RUS) | 13.650 | 14.450 | 12.200 | 11.400 | 51.700 |
| 9 | Barbora Mokosova (SVK) | 13.750 | 12.775 | 12.350 | 12.450 | 51.325 |
| 10 | Leah Grießer (GER) | 12.850 | 13.200 | 12.100 | 13.050 | 51.200 |
| 11 | Briannah Tsang (CAN) | 14.000 | 11.850 | 12.950 | 12.200 | 51.000 |
| 12 | Dorien Eva Motten (BEL) | 13.500 | 12.950 | 11.250 | 12.900 | 50.600 |
| 13 | Pauline Tratz (GER) | 13.850 | 12.900 | 11.650 | 11.950 | 50.350 |
| 14 | Jasmin Mader (AUT) | 13.400 | 12.400 | 11.750 | 12.600 | 49.400 |
| 15 | Vera van Pol (NED) | 13.300 | 12.100 | 11.400 | 12.600 | 49.400 |
| 16 | Dalia Al-Salty (HUN) | 12.400 | 11.900 | 12.350 | 12.150 | 48.800 |
| 17 | Mai Liu Hsiang-han (TPE) | 12.450 | 12.400 | 10.525 | 12.950 | 48.325 |
| 18 | Maija Karoliina Leinonen (FIN) | 13.000 | 11.700 | 11.150 | 11.550 | 47.400 |
