= Ana Filipa Martins =

Portuguese artistic gymnast (born 1996)

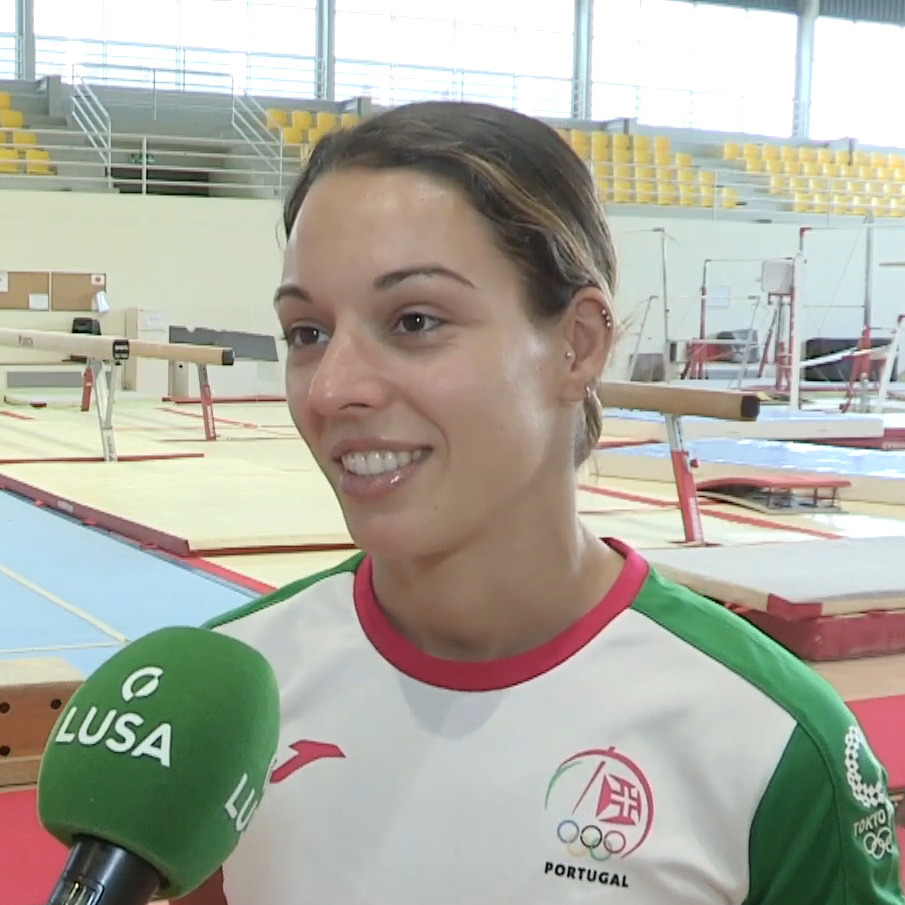
- Martins in 2024

Personal information
- Full name: Ana Filipa da Silva Martins
- Born: 9 January 1996 (age 30) Porto, Portugal
- Height: 1.63 m (5 ft 4 in)

Gymnastics career
- Discipline: Women's artistic gymnastics
- Country represented: Portugal; (2012–2024)
- Club: Acro Clube da Maia
- Head coach: Cristina Gomes
- Retired: 1 September 2024
- Awards: Shooting Star Award (2024)
Medal record
Representing Portugal
Summer Universiade
Bronze medal – third place	2015 Gwangju	Balance beam
Mediterranean Games
Bronze medal – third place	2022 Oran	Uneven Bars
FIG World Cup
Event	1st	2nd	3rd
Apparatus World Cup	0	1	3
World Challenge Cup	3	2	5
Total	3	3	8

Ana Filipa da Silva Martins (born 9 January 1996) is a retired Portuguese artistic gymnast who competed at the 2016, 2020, and 2024 Olympic Games. She won a bronze medal at the 2015 Summer Universiade on the balance beam. She is the first Portuguese gymnast to win a World Cup gold medal.

At the 2021 European Championships, Martins became the first Portuguese gymnast to qualify to a European Championships event final, earning a spot in the uneven bars final. She also debuted a new skill, a Hindorff to mixed-grip, making her the first Portuguese gymnast to get a skill named after them in the Code of Points.

== Career ==
Martins competed at the 2012 European Championships, and the Portuguese team finished twenty-first in the qualification round.

=== 2013 ===
Martins competed at the Cottbus World Cup and finished seventh on the uneven bars, sixth on the balance beam, and tied for seventh on the floor exercise. She then went to the European Championships in Moscow and qualified for the all-around final where she finished fifteenth. At the Ljubljana World Cup, she finished fourth on the uneven bars and seventh on the balance beam, and she won the bronze medal on the floor exercise behind Ellie Black and Noémi Makra. Then at the Anadia Challenge Cup, she finished sixth on the balance beam. She then competed at the World Championships where she finished twenty-seventh in the all-around during the qualification round, and she was the second reserve for the all-around final.

=== 2014 ===
Martins competed at the Cottbus World Cup where she finished sixth on the uneven bars. She then went to the Osijek Challenge Cup and finished fourth on the uneven bars and floor exercise and eighth on the balance beam. At the European Championships in Sofia, she finished twelfth in the all-around. Then at the Anadia Challenge Cup, she won the bronze medal on vault behind Teja Belak and Elisa Hämmerle, the silver medal on the uneven bars behind Jessica López, and finished fifth on the balance beam. She won the gold medal on the floor exercise, and this was the first gold medal won by a Portuguese gymnast on the World Cup Circuit. At the World Championships, she qualified for the all-around final and finished sixteenth. She then went to the Medellín Challenge Cup where she won the gold medal on the uneven bars. She finished fifth on the balance beam, and she won the bronze medal on the floor exercise behind Mariana Chiarella and Saša Golob. At the Joaquin Blume Memorial, she won the bronze medal in the all-around behind Roxana Popa and Marta Pihan-Kulesza.

=== 2015 ===
Martins began her season at the Cottbus World Cup where she won the bronze medal on both the uneven bars and the floor exercise. Additionally, she tied for sixth place on the balance beam. Then, she went to the Doha World Cup where she finished eighth on the uneven bars, sixth on the balance beam, and fourth on the floor exercise. At the European Championships, she qualified for the all-around final and finished eighth with a total score of 54.699. She won the all-around at the Portuguese Championships with a total score of 52.900- over eight points higher than the second-place finisher. Then at the Anadia World Cup, she won the silver medal on the uneven bars behind Jessica López. She then competed at the 2015 Summer Universiade and qualified for the all-around final where she finished fourth. She placed fifth in the uneven bars final and eighth in the floor exercise final. In the balance beam final, she won the bronze medal behind Yu Minobe and Polina Fedorova. At the World Championships, she finished thirty-sixth in the all-around during the qualification round. This result earned Portugal a spot at the 2016 Olympic Test Event.

=== 2016 ===
Martins competed at the Doha World Challenge Cup where she won the bronze medal in the uneven bars and the balance beam. She then competed at the Olympic Test Event and finished thirtieth in the all-around. This result earned her an individual spot at the Olympic Games. She competed at the European Championships and the Portuguese team finished sixteenth in the qualification round. She competed at the 2016 Olympic Games and finished thirty-seventh in the all-around during the qualification round. This was the best-ever result for a Portuguese gymnast at the Olympic Games.

=== 2017 ===
At the European Championships, Martins finished eighth in the all-around final. She then won the all-around at the Portuguese Championships. At the International GymSport in Sangalhos, she won the gold medal in the all-around, the uneven bars, and the balance beam. She then represented Portugal at the 2017 Summer Universiade with Diana Abrantes and Inês Romero, and they finished seventh in the team competition. Individually, Martins finished sixth in the all-around final. She then competed at the World Championships and qualified for the all-around final and finished eighteenth.

=== 2018 ===
Martins competed as a guest of the Egiba Club at the 2nd Spanish League, and the club won the bronze medal. At the International GymSport in her hometown Porto, she only competed on the uneven bars but won the gold medal on that event. She then won the gold medal in the all-around at the Portuguese Championships. At the Guimarães Challenge Cup, she won the silver medal on the uneven bars behind Ahtziri Sandoval, and she placed fourth on the balance beam. She then only competed on the uneven bars and the balance beam at the European Championships, but she did not qualify for either event final, and the Portuguese team finished fourteenth in the qualification round. At the Szombathely Challenge Cup, she finished eighth on the uneven bars and fifth on the balance beam. At the World Championships, the Portuguese team finished twenty-eighth in the qualification round.

=== 2019 ===
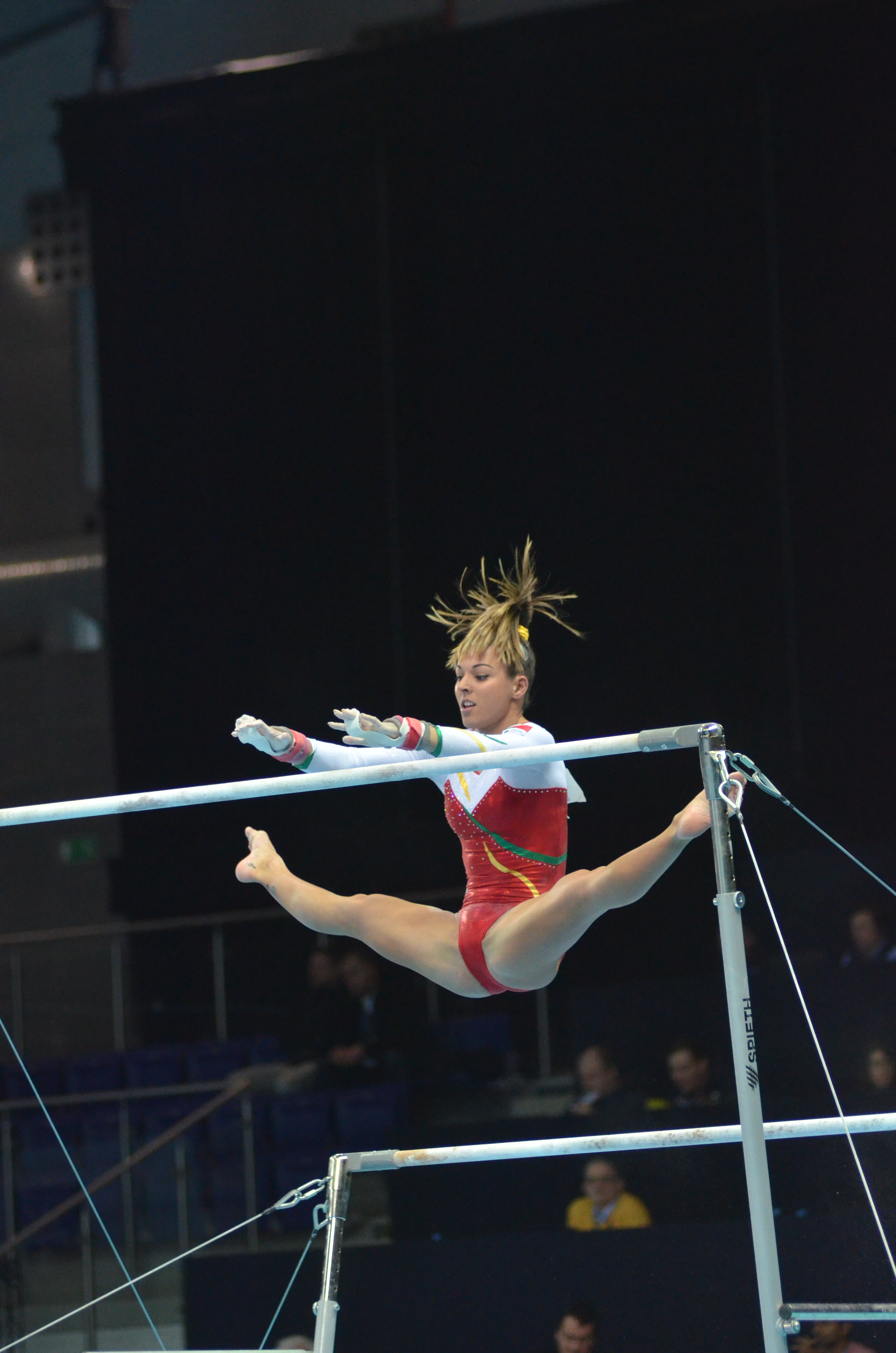
Martins on the uneven bars at the 2019 European Championships

Martins competed at the European Championships and qualified for the all-around final where she finished in tenth place. She then won the gold medal in the all-around at the Portuguese Championships. She was then selected to represent Portugal at the 2019 European Games, and she qualified for the all-around final and finished fifteenth. At the Paris Challenge Cup, she finished fifth on the uneven bars. She then went to the Guimarães Challenge Cup and won the bronze medal on the uneven bars behind Frida Esparza and Elsa García and the gold medal on the balance beam. She then went to the World Championships and finished sixty-fifth in the all-around during the qualification round. This result earned her an individual spot at the 2020 Olympics.

=== 2020–2021 ===
Due to the COVID-19 pandemic in Portugal, Martins only competed in one competition in 2020- the Portuguese Open in November. She won the gold medal on vault, uneven bars, and balance beam.

She then competed at the 2021 European Championships. She made history by becoming the first Portuguese gymnast to qualify for a European event final after qualifying fourth into the uneven bars final. She also became the first Portuguese gymnast to have a skill added to the Code of Points- a Hindorff release with a half turn to mixed grip. She explained on the Portuguese radio show TSF that she learned the move during the COVID pandemic while there were no competitions. She also qualified for the all-around final where she finished eleventh. In the uneven bars final, she fell and finished eighth. She then represented Portugal at the 2020 Summer Olympics but did not advance past the qualification round. After the Olympics, she competed at the World Championships in Kitakyushu, Japan. She qualified for the all-around final and finished in seventh place. She also qualified for the uneven bars final where she finished eighth. She was the first Portuguese gymnast to ever qualify for an event final, and she bested her own record for the highest all-around finish by a Portuguese gymnast.

=== 2022 ===
Martins won the gold medal on the uneven bars at the Portuguese Championships. She then represented Portugal at the 2022 Mediterranean Games and led the team to a fifth-place finish. She won the bronze medal in the uneven bars final behind Italians Giorgia Villa and Martina Maggio.

=== 2023 ===
Martins won the bronze medal on the balance beam at the Cottbus World Cup. She then finished eighth on the uneven bars at the Baku World Cup. She won the all-around title at the Portuguese Championships by nearly five points. At the 2023 World Championships, she secured an individual quota for the 2024 Olympic Games by finished fourth in the all-around among athletes whose teams did not qualify. She finished 21st in the all-around final.

=== 2024 ===
In September 2024, Martins announced her retirement from gymnastics.

== Post-retirement career ==
In 2025, Martins was elected as the women's artistic gymnastics (WAG) athlete representative for the International Federation of gymnastics' (FIG) athlete commission for the 2025-2028 term.

== Eponymous skill ==
Martins has one uneven bars release move named after her in the Code of Points.

Apparatus	Name	Description	Difficulty (Note: Valid for the 2025–2028 Code of Points)	Added to the Code of Points
Uneven bars	Martins	Clear hip circle on high bar with counter straddle over the high bar with ½ turn (180°) to hang in mixed L grip	E	2021 European Championships

== Competitive history ==
Year	Event	Team	AA	VT	UB	BB	FX
Senior
2013	Cottbus World Cup				7	6	7
2013	European Championships		15				
2013	Ljubljana World Cup				4	7	3rd place, bronze medalist(s)
2013	Anadia World Challenge Cup					6	
2014	Cottbus World Challenge Cup				6		
2014	Osijek World Challenge Cup				4	8	4
2014	Anadia World Challenge Cup			3rd place, bronze medalist(s)	8	2nd place, silver medalist(s)	1st place, gold medalist(s)
2014	World Championships		16				
2014	Medellin World Challenge Cup				1st place, gold medalist(s)	5	3rd place, bronze medalist(s)
2014	Joaquin Blume Memorial		3rd place, bronze medalist(s)				
2015	Cottbus World Cup				3rd place, bronze medalist(s)	6	3rd place, bronze medalist(s)
2015	Doha World Cup				8	6	4
2015	European Championships		12				
2015	Portuguese Championships		1st place, gold medalist(s)				
2015	Anadia World Cup				2nd place, silver medalist(s)		7
2015	Summer Universiade		4		5	3rd place, bronze medalist(s)	8
2016	Doha World Challenge Cup				3rd place, bronze medalist(s)	3rd place, bronze medalist(s)	
2016	Olympic Test Event		30				
2016	Olympic Games		37				
2017
2017	European Championships		8				
2017	Portuguese Championships		1st place, gold medalist(s)				
2017	International GymSport		1st place, gold medalist(s)		1st place, gold medalist(s)	1st place, gold medalist(s)	
2017	Summer Universiade	7	6				
2017	World Championships		18				
2018	2nd Spanish League	3rd place, bronze medalist(s)					
2018	International GymSport				1st place, gold medalist(s)		
2018	Portuguese Championships		1st place, gold medalist(s)				
2018	Guimaraes World Challenge Cup				2nd place, silver medalist(s)	4	
2018	Szombathely World Challenge Cup				8	5	
2019
2019	European Championships		10				
2019	Portuguese Championships		1st place, gold medalist(s)				
2019	Portuguese Super Finals				1st place, gold medalist(s)	1st place, gold medalist(s)	1st place, gold medalist(s)
2019	European Games		15				
2019	Paris World Challenge Cup				5		
2019	Guimaraes World Challenge Cup				3rd place, bronze medalist(s)	1st place, gold medalist(s)	
2020	Portuguese Open			1st place, gold medalist(s)	1st place, gold medalist(s)	1st place, gold medalist(s)	
2021
2021	European Championships		11		8		
2021	Olympic Games		43				
2021	World Championships		7		8		
2022	Portuguese Championships				1st place, gold medalist(s)		
2022	Mediterranean Games	5			3rd place, bronze medalist(s)	7	
2023	Cottbus World Cup					3rd place, bronze medalist(s)	
2023	Baku World Cup				8		
2023	Portuguese Championships		1st place, gold medalist(s)				
2023	World Championships		21				
2024	Doha World Cup				4	6	
2024	European Championships		13		5		
2024	Olympic Games		20				
