= Barbora Mokošová =

Slovak artistic gymnast (born 1997)

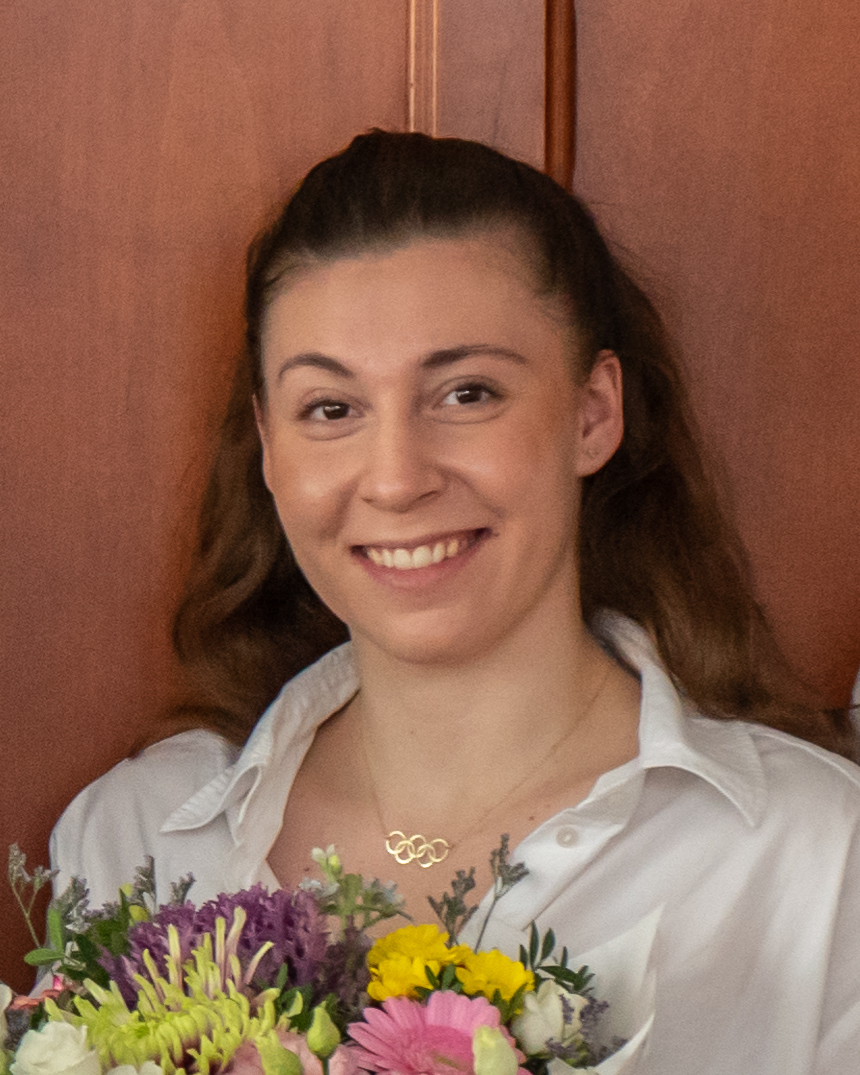
- Mokošová in 2021

Personal information
- Full name: Barbora Kundrát
- Nickname: Barča
- Born: 10 March 1997 (age 29) Bratislava, Slovakia
- Height: 1.68 m (5 ft 6 in)
- Spouse: Filip Kundrát (m. 2025)

Gymnastics career
- Discipline: Women's artistic gymnastics
- Country represented: Slovakia (2012-present)
- Club: Slavia UK Bratislava
- Head coach: Martin Žvalo
Medal record
Women's artistic gymnastics
Representing Slovakia
European Championships
Bronze medal – third place	2020 Mersin	Uneven bars
FIG World Cup
Event	1st	2nd	3rd
World Challenge Cup	2	3	3
Total	2	3	3

Barbora Kundrát (née Mokošová born 10 March 1997) is a Slovak artistic gymnast. She is the 2020 European bronze medalist on the uneven bars and the first gymnast representing Slovakia to receive a medal at the European Championships. She represented Slovakia at the 2016 and 2020 Olympic Games. She is also a two-time World Challenge Cup champion on the uneven bars.

== Early life ==
Mokošová was born on 10 March 1997 in Bratislava. She began gymnastics when she was four years old because her mother is a gymnastics coach.

== Career ==
Mokošová competed at the 2012 Austrian Team Open and placed tenth with the Slovak team and twenty-fifth in the individual all-around. Her first major international competition was the 2012 Junior European Championships where she finished thirty-seventh in the all-around during the qualification round.

=== 2013 ===
Mokošová became age-eligible for senior competition in 2013. She made her senior debut at the Cottbus World Cup but did not qualify for any of the event finals. Then at the European Championships in Moscow, she finished thirty-eighth in the all-around during the qualification round. She then competed at the Ljubljana World Cup and once again did not qualify for the event finals. Then at the Gym Festival Trnava, she won the bronze medal in the all-around behind Oksana Chusovitina and Anna Pavlova. In the event finals, she won the gold medal on the uneven bars and the bronze medal on the floor exercise. She also placed fourth on vault and balance beam. At the Hungarian Grand Prix, she finished fifth in the floor exercise event final. She competed at the Osijek Challenge Cup but did not make any of the event finals. Her final competition of the season was the World Championships where she finished thirty-ninth in the all-around during the qualification round with a total score of 50.999.

=== 2014 ===
Mokošová won the silver medal in the all-around at the Salamunov Memorial in Ruše, Slovenia behind Lithuanian gymnast Laura Švilpaitė. Her next competition was the Osijek World Cup but did not qualify for any finals. At the European Championships, she finished nineteenth in the all-around during the qualification round. Then at the Gym Festival Trnava, she won the bronze medal in the all-around behind Anna Pavlova and Lisa Katharina Hill. At the Hungarian Grand Prix, she finished fourth in the all-around. Then in the event finals, she won the silver medal on the uneven bars behind Dorina Böczögő and bronze medals on the balance beam and floor exercise. She competed at the World Championships and placed eighty-first in the all-around during the qualification round.

=== 2015 ===
Mokošová competed at the Ljubljana and Varna World Cups but did not qualify for any finals. Then at the European Championships, she finished seventeenth in the all-around with a total score of 51.866. At the Gym Festival Trnava, she won the gold medal on the floor exercise and the silver medal on the uneven bars, and she placed sixth on the balance beam. She represented Slovakia at the 2015 European Games and finished eighteenth in the all-around final. She finished fifth on the uneven bars at the Osijek World Cup. Then at the Hungarian Grand Prix, she finished fourth in the all-around and floor exercise and sixth on the balance beam. She competed at the World Championships and finished ninetieth in the all-around during the qualification round.

=== 2016 ===
Mokošová finished fourth with the Slovak team and won the bronze medal in the all-around behind Zsófia Kovács and Giulia Steingruber at the Austrian Team Open. Then at the Olympic Test Event she placed forty-third in the all-around and earned an individual spot at the 2016 Olympic Games. She then won the gold medal on the balance beam and a bronze on the uneven bars at the Gym Festival Trnava, and she also finished fourth in the all-around. At the European Gymnastics, she finished thirteenth in the all-around during the qualification round. She was invited to compete as a guest at the Dutch Olympic Qualifier and finished twelfth in the all-around. She then represented Slovakia at the 2016 Summer Olympics and finished forty-fifth in the all-around during the qualification round with a total score of 52.799.

=== 2017 ===
Mokošová won the gold medal with the team and the silver medal in the all-around at the Austrian Team Challenge. Then at the Elek Matolay Memorial, she won the silver medal in the all-around behind Zsófia Kovács. In the event finals, she won the gold medal on the floor exercise and the silver medal on the uneven bars and balance beam behind Kovács. At the European Championships, she finished seventeenth in the all-around final. She her first World Cup medal with a bronze medal on the floor exercise at the Koper World Challenge Cup behind Carina Kröll and Ellie Black. Then at the Osijek Challenge Cup, she finished seventh on the uneven bars and fifth on the balance beam. She won a silver medal in the all-around at the Gym Festival Trnava behind Hitomi Hatakeda. In the event finals, she won the bronze medal behind Hatakeda and Evgenia Shelgunova, and she placed fourth on the balance beam and floor exercise. She then represented Slovakia at the 2017 Summer Universiade and finished ninth in the all-around final. At the Szombathely Challenge Cup, she finished fifth on both the uneven bars and floor exercise. Then at the Paris Challenge Cup, she finished sixth on the uneven bars. At the World Championships, she finished thirty-first in the all-around during the qualification round.

=== 2018 ===
Mokošová began the season at the Austrian Team Open with a gold medal in the all-around and a silver medal with the team. Then at the Elek Matolay Memorial, she won a silver medal in the all-around behind Zsófia Kovács and gold medals on the uneven bars and balance beam. At the Osijek World Challenge Cup, she won silver medals on the uneven bars and the balance beam, both behind Ukrainian Diana Varinska. Then at the Koper World Challenge Cup, she won her first World Cup gold medal on the uneven bars and also won the bronze medal on the floor exercise. She won the gold medal in the all-around at the Gym Festival Trnava with a total score of 53.900. In the event finals, she won the gold medals on the uneven bars and floor exercise and the silver medal on the balance beam behind Katarzyna Jurkowska-Kowalska. She won another all-around gold medal at the Budapest Friendly and also won a bronze medal with the team. She then competed at the European Championships and helped the Slovak team place nineteenth during the qualification round. She won two more World Cup medals at the Szombathely World Challenge Cup, a silver on the uneven bars and a bronze on the floor exercise. At the end of 2018, she tore several ligaments in her ankle at a training camp in Hungary and had surgery.

=== 2019 ===
Mokošová returned to competition at the Osijek Challenge Cup and placed sixth on the uneven bars. Then at the Gym Festival Trnava, she won the silver medal in the all-around behind Bianka Schermann. In the event finals, she won the silver medal on the uneven bars behind Schermann and on the balance beam behind Noémi Makra. She then represented Slovakia at the 2019 Summer Universiade and placed eighth in both the uneven bars and balance beam event finals. Then at the Szombathely Challenge Cup, she placed fourth on the uneven bars and seventh on the balance beam. She then competed at the World Championships and finished sixty-third in the all-around during the qualification round. This result qualified her for the 2020 Olympic Games.

=== 2020 ===
The competitions Mokošová was scheduled to compete in during the 2020 season were either canceled or postponed due to the COVID-19 pandemic. At the postponed European Championships in December, she won the bronze medal on the uneven bars with a score of 13.300 behind Hungarian gymnasts Zsófia Kovács and Zója Székely. This made her the first gymnast representing Slovakia to win a medal at the European Championships.

=== 2021 ===
Mokošová began the 2021 season at the European Championships where she finished eighteenth in the all-around final. Then at the Varna Challenge Cup, she finished fourth on the uneven bars. At the FIT Challenge, she finished eleventh with the team, seventh on the uneven bars, and twenty-seventh in the all-around. She then represented Slovakia at the 2020 Summer Olympics where she finished fifty-second in the all-around during the qualification round. She won her second World Cup gold medal on the uneven bars at the Koper World Challenge Cup with a score of 13.650. Then at the Gym Festival Trnava, she won gold medals on the uneven bars and balance beam. She competed on the uneven bars and balance beam at the World Championships but did not advance into the finals.

== Awards ==
In 2021, Mokošová was named to Forbes Slovakia's 30 Under 30 list.

== Personal life ==
Mokošová speaks Slovak, English, and German. She is a European Young Ambassador (EYA) for the European Youth Olympic Festival. In August 2025, she married former hockey player Filip Kundrát.
