= Janine Berger =

German artistic gymnast

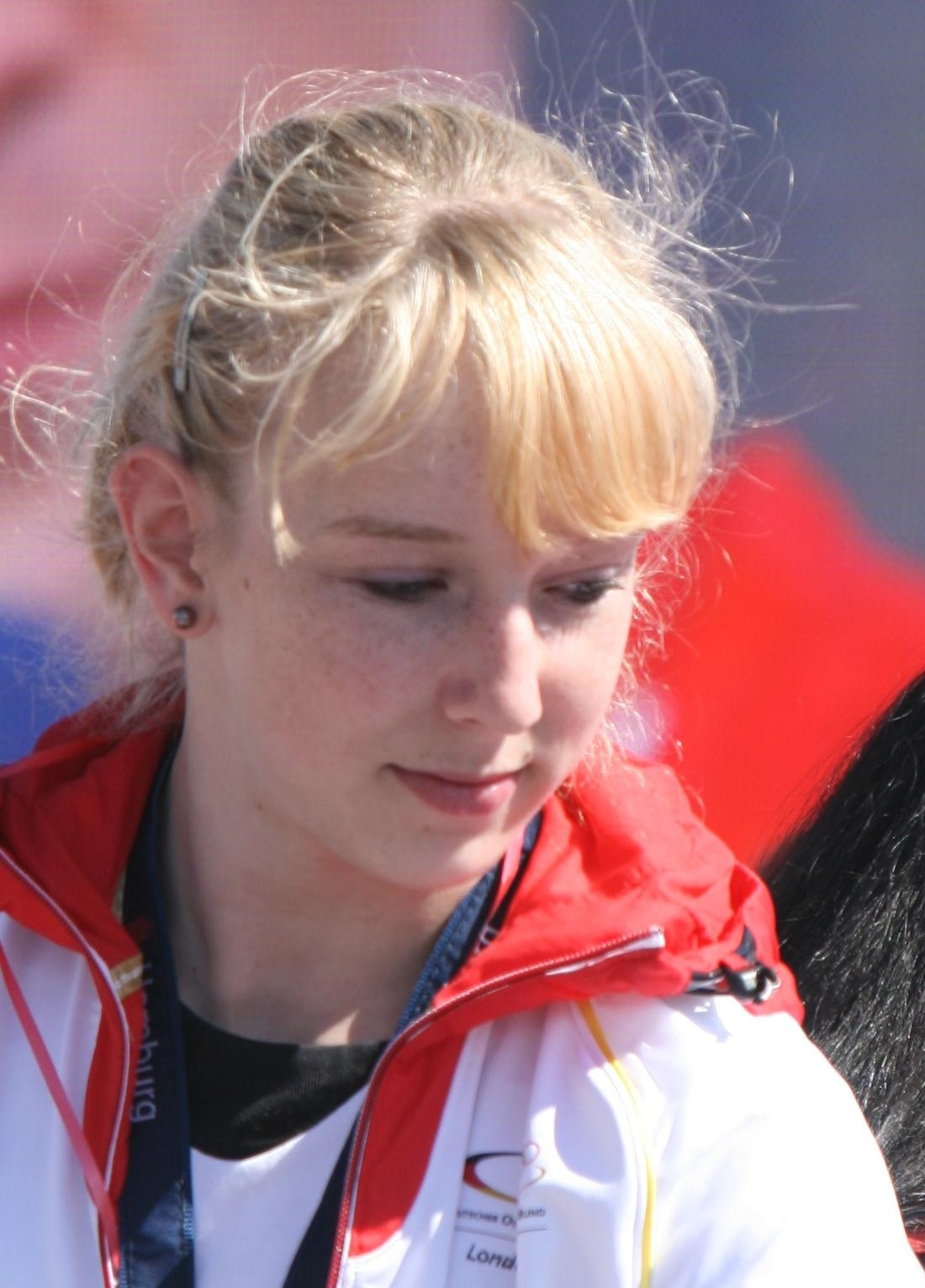
- Berger in 2012

Personal information
- Born: 21 April 1996 (age 30) Dillingen an der Donau, Germany
- Height: 1.63 m (5 ft 4 in)

Gymnastics career
- Discipline: Women's artistic gymnastics
- Country represented: Germany
- Club: SSV Ulm 1846
- Head coach: Gabor Szucs
Medal record
Women's artistic gymnastics
Representing Germany
FIG World Cup
Event	1st	2nd	3rd
Apparatus World Cup	1	0	0

Janine Berger (born 21 April 1996) is a German retired artistic gymnast. She represented Germany at the 2012 Summer Olympics and finished fourth on the vault. She also competed at the 2014 European Championships and finished fifth on the vault.

== Gymnastics career ==
Berger became age-eligible for senior international competitions in 2012 and won the German national title on the vault. As a result, she was selected for the 2012 Summer Olympics team. During the qualification round, she competed on the vault, uneven bars, and floor exercise, but failed to reach the finals in the latter two. She did qualify for the vault final, where she performed a Rudi and a double-twisting Tsukahara to finish fourth. She only finished 0.034 points behind the bronze medalist, Maria Paseka.

In April 2013, she tore her medial collateral ligament and had surgery. She competed later that year at the 2013 Anadia World Challenge Cup and finished fifth on the vault. She won the vault competition at the 2014 Cottbus World Cup. Then at the 2014 European Championships, she competed on the vault and uneven bars to help Germany place fourth in the team final. Additionally, she finished fifth in the vault final.

Berger placed fifth in the all-around at the 2014 German Championships. However, during the vault final, she tore her ACL, LCL, and menisucus on a double-twisting Tsukahara. She underwent two surgeries to repair the knee. She was able to return to competition on the uneven bars at the 2015 German Championships, but she fell. She continued to deal with knee pain throughout 2015 and 2016 and had to miss the 2016 Summer Olympics. She tore her meniscus again in September 2016 and had another surgery.

Berger advanced into the uneven bars final at the 2018 German Championships and placed fifth. Prior to the 2019 Summer Universiade, she tore her meniscus again, but she continued to train and compete. There, she finished fourth on the uneven bars. At the 2019 German Championships, she placed fourth on both the vault and uneven bars.

In 2025, Berger went public with allegations of abuse from the German Gymnastics Federation and discussed her experience with depression and eating disorders.
