= Annelise Koster =

Namibian artistic gymnast

- Born: 16 October 1999 (age 26)

Gymnastics career
- Discipline: Women's artistic gymnastics
- Country represented: Namibia (2015)

Annelise Koster (born 16 October 1999) is a Namibian artistic gymnast, representing her nation at international competitions.

In September 2015 Koster competed in the All Africa Games held in Brazzaville. She finished sixth in the uneven bars and seventh in the balance beam, having failed to make the final of the vault. (The floor exercise was cancelled after event organisers ordered the wrong gymnastics floor.)

Koster competed at the 2015 World Artistic Gymnastics Championships in Glasgow in October 2015. She took part in the uneven bars event, but did not progress through to the final.
