= Monika Frandofert =

Polish artistic gymnast

- Full name: Monika Frandofert
- Born: June 16, 1991 (age 35) Kraków, Poland

Gymnastics career
- Discipline: Women's artistic gymnastics
- Country represented: Poland (2007 - 2013)
- Club: Wisła Kraków
- Head coach: Mariola Frandofert
- Retired: 2013

Monika Frandofert (born 16 June 1991) is a Polish female artistic gymnast and the 2011 Polish all-around champion. She represented Poland at the 2007 and 2010 World Artistic Gymnastics Championships.

== Career ==
Frandofert started her senior career in 2007, when she won her first national title on the floor exercise. She also took silver on the balance beam, as well as two bronze medals in the all-around and vault finals. Later that year, she represented Poland at the 2007 World Artistic Gymnastics Championships in Stuttgart, where she placed 22nd in the team event.

In 2008, she won two bronze medals at the Polish Championships in Szczecin. One year later, she competed at the 2009 European Artistic Gymnastics Championships in London, where she finished 53rd in the individual all-around qualifications. At the National Championships that year, she won silver medals in the all-around and floor finals, as well as bronze on the uneven bars.

She was a part of the Polish team at the 2010 European Artistic Gymnastics Championships in Birmingham, where she helped the Polish team finish 10th in the team competition. She then competed at the Polish Championships, where she only took bronze on the floor exercise. At the end of the year, Poland finished 17th in the team event at the 2010 World Artistic Gymnastics Championships in Rotterdam, with Frandofert as one of its representatives.

In 2011, she won the national all-around title and finished 48th at the 2011 European Artistic Gymnastics Championships in Berlin. She also performed in the 4th season of Mam talent!, a Polish version of Got Talent, alongside 2016 Olympian Katarzyna Jurkowska-Kowalska.

Her last big international competition was in Brussels at the 2012 European Artistic Gymnastics Championships, where she placed 13th in the team competition.

Frandofert also made event finals at multiple FIG World Cup competitions.

== Personal life ==
She was born on June 16, 1991, in Kraków, Poland. After retiring from the competitive sport, Frandofert got her degree in cosmetology and became a professional make up artist.
