= Katarzyna Jurkowska-Kowalska =

Polish artistic gymnast

- Full name: Katarzyna Iwona Jurkowska-Kowalska
- Born: 18 February 1992 (age 34) Kraków, Poland
- Height: 1.61 m (5 ft 3 in)

Gymnastics career
- Discipline: Women's artistic gymnastics
- Country represented: Poland (2007 - 2019)
- Club: Wisła Kraków
- Head coaches: Joanna-Uracz-Kocur, Przemysław Lis
- Former coaches: Beata Bodzoń, Valerij Kovalenko
- Eponymous skills: Floor Exercise: split jump with 1/1 turn to ring Balance Beam: double twisting Gainer dismount
Medal record
Women's artistic gymnastics
Representing Poland
FIG World Cup
| Event | 1st | 2nd | 3rd |
|---|---|---|---|
| World Challenge Cup | 1 | 3 | 1 |

Katarzyna Iwona Jurkowska-Kowalska (born 18 February 1992) is a Polish former artistic gymnast and a two-time Polish all-around champion. She represented Poland at the 2016 Summer Olympic Games in Rio de Janeiro.

== Gymnastics career ==
Jurkowska-Kowalska began gymnastics when she was six years old. She competed at her first World Championships in 2007 and helped the Polish team finish 22nd. She also competed at the 2009 World Championships and finished 52nd in the all-around qualification round.

Jurkowska-Kowalska competed at the 2010 World Championships alongside Marta Pihan-Kulesza, Gabriela Sasnal, Paula Plichta, Monika Frandofert, and Joanna Litewka, and they finished 17th in the team qualification round. At the 2011 Ostrava World Challenge Cup, she won a silver medal on the balance beam.

Jurkowska-Kowalska won a silver medal on the balance beam at the 2012 Maribor World Challenge Cup behind Céline van Gerner. She qualified for the balance beam final at the 2013 European Championships and finished fifth. She also finished fifth on the balance beam at the 2014 Cottbus World Cup. She then helped the Polish team finish 10th at the 2014 European Championships. Then at the 2014 World Championships, she competed with the Polish team that finished 17th.

Jurkowska-Kowalska was the second reserve for the all-around final at the 2015 European Championships. She then competed with the Polish team that finished 11th at the 2015 European Games. She then helped the Polish team finish 19th at the 2015 World Championships.

Jurkowska-Kowalska competed at the 2016 Olympic Test Event and finished 32nd in the all-around, helping Poland receive an Olympic berth. The Polish Gymnastics Association announced Jurkowska-Kowalska would be selected for the berth since she was the highest-placing Polish gymnast at the Olympic Test Event. She won a gold medal on the balance beam at the 2016 Cottbus World Challenge Cup, where she also won the floor exercise silver medal. Then at the Varna World Challenge Cup, she won a bronze medal on the vault. She finished eighth in the vault final at the 2016 European Championships.

Jurkowska-Kowalska represented Poland at the 2016 Summer Olympics and finished 49th in the all-around during the qualification round, failing to advance to any finals.

Jurkowska-Kowalska announced her retirement from gymnastics in January 2019.

== Eponymous skills ==
Jurkowska-Kowalska has two eponymous skills listed in the Code of Points.

| Apparatus | Name | Description | Difficulty (Note: Valid for the 2025–2028 Code of Points) | Added to the Code of Points |
|---|---|---|---|---|
| Balance beam | Jurkowska-Kowalska | Gainer salto stretched with 2/1 twist (720°) at end of the beam | E (0.5) | 2018 World Championships |
| Floor exercise | Jurkowska-Kowalska | Split jump with 1/1 turn (360°) to ring position | C (0.3) | 2014 World Championships |

== Family ==
She is married to Arkadiusz Kowalski, a professional handball player. On September 3, 2019, she gave birth to a son.
