= Marta Pihan-Kulesza =

Polish artistic gymnast

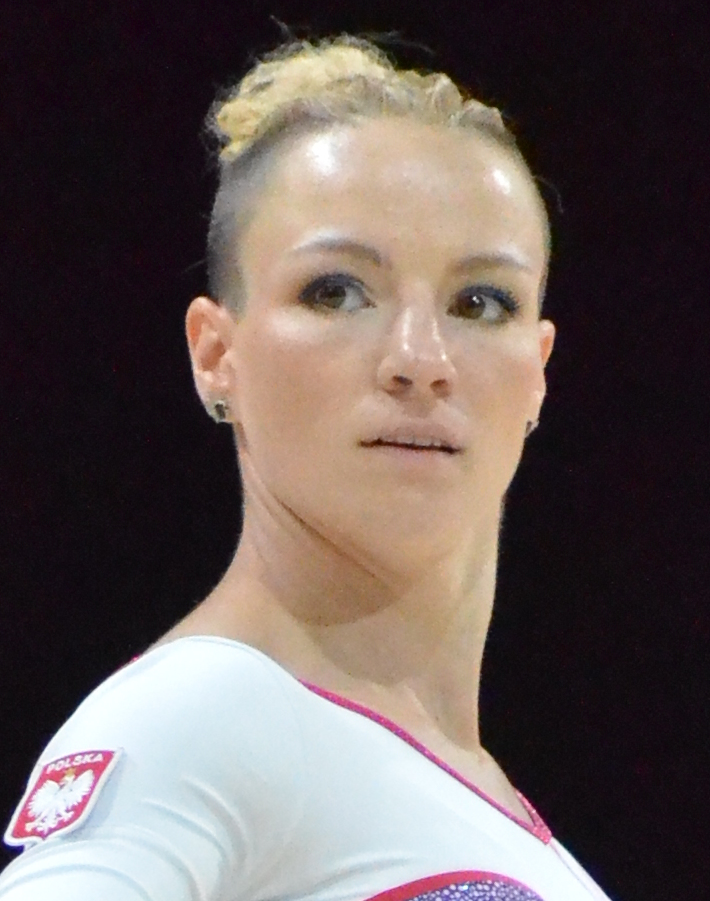
- Pihan-Kulesza in 2019

Personal information
- Full name: Marta Pihan-Kulesza
- Born: 23 July 1987 (age 39) Szczecin, Poland
- Height: 162 cm (5 ft 4 in)

Gymnastics career
- Discipline: Women's artistic gymnastics
- Country represented: Poland; (2003–2016, 2018–present)
- Club: MKS Kusy Szczecin
- Head coach: Jarosław Duda
Medal record
Representing Poland
Women's artistic gymnastics
Event	1st	2nd	3rd
FIG World Cup	3	2	2
FIG World Challenge Cup	4	4	3
Total	7	6	5

Marta Pihan-Kulesza (Polish pronunciation: [ˈmarta ˈpixan kuˈlɛʂa]; born 23 July 1987) is a Polish artistic gymnast. She represented her country at the 2008 and 2012 Summer Olympics. She is a 12-time Polish all-around champion (2004–2005, 2007–2010, 2012–2014, 2018, 2020, 2024) and a multiple-time World Cup medalist.

== Personal life ==
Marta Pihan was born on 23 July 1987 in Szczecin, Zachodniopomorskie, Poland. She has been married to fellow gymnast Roman Kulesza since 2009. In 2017, she gave birth to her daughter Jagna. In 2022, she gave birth to her son Radlimir.

== Career ==
Pihan-Kulesza became the Polish all-around champion nine times – in 2004, 2005, 2007, 2008, 2009, 2010, 2012, 2013 and 2014. She competed at the 2008 Summer Olympics in Beijing, China. She also represented her country at the 2012 Summer Olympics in London where she had a chance to be in the top 12 all-around after first three rotations, but eventually finished 19th due to a fall on the balance beam. She was also third reserve for the floor exercise final, where she placed 11th.

She is known for a difficult beam routine which includes a clean switch 1/1 and a double front (and later double Arabian) dismount. Her floor routine also had considerable difficulty.

=== 2014 ===
In the qualifying round at the 2014 European Championships in Sofia, Pihan-Kulesza posted a 56.499, which was the third highest all-around score. She qualified third on the balance beam with a 14.400 and sixth on floor with a 14.300. In the finals Pihan-Kulesza had a wobbly beam routine placing sixth with a 13.733 score. She performed a clean floor routine and tied for the fourth place with Romania's Diana Bulimar.

At the 2014 World Championships in Nanning, China, Pihan-Kulesza qualified 13th for the all-around final with a 55.665 score. She finished third reserve on floor with 13.900 after experiencing difficulty with her last pass where she debuted and stuck her piked double Arabian. She also finished 25th on both the balance beam and the uneven bars with a score of 13.766 and 13.933 respectively. Her scores contributed to Polish team's 17th-place finish, which was enough to qualify for the 2015 World Championships held in Glasgow. She made a few mistakes in the all-around final and finished 14th with a 55.156.

=== 2015–2016 ===
In 2015, Pihan-Kulesza competed at the European Championships in Montpellier, France, where she finished fifth in the all-around competition with a 55.198, as well as fifth in the floor exercise final with a 14.233. A few weeks later, she was set to compete at the 2015 European Games in Baku, but had to withdraw from the competition due to an injury sustained at the Polish Championships. At the 2015 World Championships in Glasgow, she made a few mistakes in the qualifications and did not reach any finals.

In early 2016, Pihan-Kulesza announced her retirement from competitive gymnastics at the age of 29.

=== 2017–2020 ===
In 2017, she gave birth to her daughter, Jagna. At the end of the year, she came back to training and made a comeback at the 2018 Polish Cup, where she took the all-around gold. At the end of June, she won her 9th national all-around title at the Polish Championships in Gdańsk. She competed at the 2018 World Artistic Gymnastics Championships in Doha, however, she failed to make any finals.

In 2019, she competed at the 2019 European Artistic Gymnastics Championships in her hometown, but mistakes in qualifications did not allow her to compete in any of the finals.

In November 2020, Marta won her 11th national all-around title at the Polish Championships in Kraków. Due to the scandal of the Polish Gymnastics Federation failing to pay back the money it owes to the European Gymnastics after hosting the 2019 European Championships, Poland was banned from competing at any international sports events organized by the continental union, therefore Pihan-Kulesza was not able to participate in the 2020 European Artistic Gymnastics Championships in Mersin.

== Floor music ==
Year	Music Title
2008	Assassin's Tango from Mr & Mrs Smith
2014	The Pink Panther theme
