= Kevin Crovetto =

Monegasque artistic gymnast (born 1992)

Kévin Crovetto
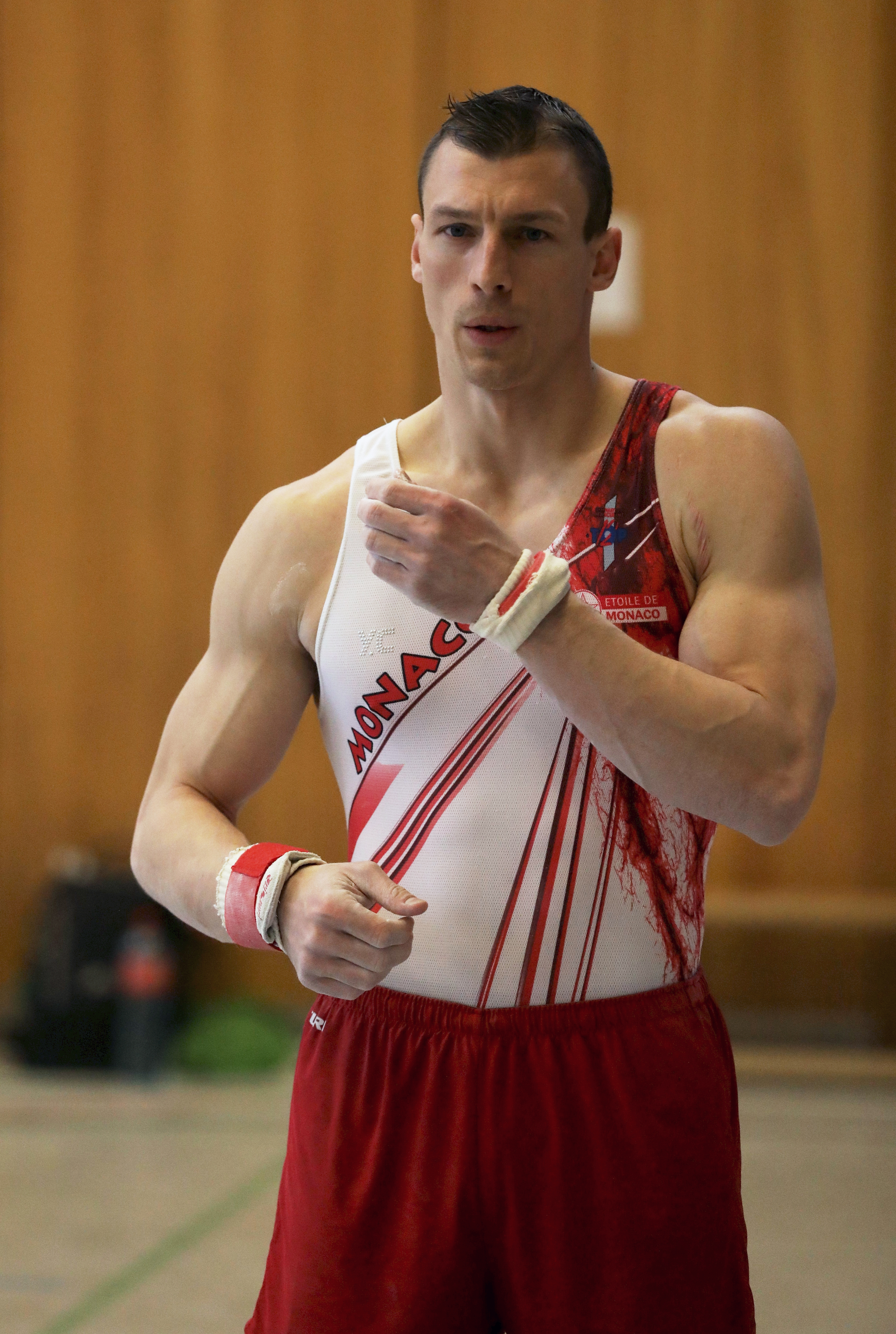
- Crovetto in 2022

Personal information
- Full name: Kévin Florient Edmond Jean Crovetto
- Born: 10 June 1992 (age 34) Monaco
- Height: 1.83 m (6 ft 0 in)

Gymnastics career
- Discipline: Men's artistic gymnastics
- Country represented: Monaco
- Club: Étoile de Monaco
- Head coach: Thierry Aymes
Medal record
Men's artistic gymnastics
Representing Monaco
Games of the Small States of Europe
Gold medal – first place	2013 Luxembourg	Team
Silver medal – second place	2025 Andorra la Vella	Horizontal Bar
Silver medal – second place	2025 Andorra la Vella	Team
Bronze medal – third place	2013 Luxembourg	Vault

Kévin Florient Edmond Jean Crovetto OLY (born 10 June 1992) is a Monegasque male artistic gymnast. He represented Monaco at the 2016 Summer Olympics, becoming the country's first Olympic gymnast since 1920.

== Career ==
Crovetto competed at his first World Championships in 2011 and finished 159th in the all-around qualification round. At the 2013 European Championships, he finished 40th in the all-around during the qualification round. He then competed at the 2013 Games of the Small States of Europe and won a gold medal with the Monegasque team. Additionally, he won a bronze medal on the vault. At the 2014 European Championships, he finished 35th in the all-around. He then finished 133rd in the all-around qualifications at the 2014 World Championships.

Crovetto finished 181st in the all-around qualification round at the 2015 World Championships. He received a berth from the Tripartite Commission to compete at the 2016 Summer Olympics. He became the first gymnast to represent Monaco at the Olympics since 1920. He finished 49th in the all-around during the qualification round with a total score of 76.056.

Crovetto represented Monaco at the 2018 Mediterranean Games and finished 17th in the all-around final. In October 2018, he had a biceps tendon rupture and a torn muscle in his shoulder that kept him out of competition until February 2019. He competed at the 2019 World Championships and finished 139th in the all-around qualification round.

During the 2021 European Championships, Crovetto fell off the parallel bars and sustained a head injury, forcing him to withdraw from the rest of the competition. He represented Monaco at the 2022 Mediterranean Games and repeated his 17th-place finish in the all-around final.
