= Elisa Hämmerle =

Austrian artistic gymnast

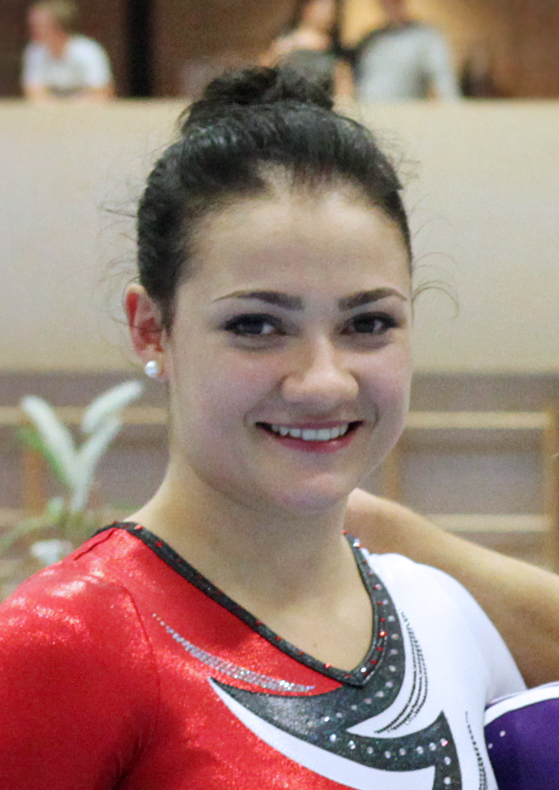
- Hämmerle in 2014

Personal information
- Alternative name: Elisa Haemmerle
- Nicknames: Eli, Lisl
- Born: 10 December 1995 (age 30) Lustenau, Austria
- Height: 166 cm (5 ft 5 in)

Gymnastics career
- Discipline: Women's artistic gymnastics
- Country represented: Austria (2009 - present)
- Club: SV PAX Haarlemermeer
- Head coaches: Patrick Kiens, Daymon Montaigne-Jones
- Former coach: Laurens Van der Hout
- Music: 2019: "Seven Nation Army" by The White Stripes
Medal record
Representing Austria
FIG World Cup
Event	1st	2nd	3rd
World Challenge Cup	0	1	3

Elisa Hämmerle (born 10 December 1995) is an Austrian artistic gymnast. She represented Austria at the 2020 Summer Olympics and finished sixty-sixth in the all-around during the qualification round. She also represented Austria at the 2010 Summer Youth Olympics and finished twelfth in the all-around final. She has won four medals on the FIG World Cup circuit, one silver and three bronze. At the 2020 European Championships, she became the first Austrian gymnast to qualify for an event final at the European Women's Artistic Gymnastics Championships when she finished eighth on the balance beam

== Career ==
Hämmerle began gymnastics when she was four years old. She was selected to represent Austria at the 2010 Summer Youth Olympics which were held in Singapore. She qualified for the all-around final where she placed twelfth with a total score of 51.850.

=== 2011 ===
Hämmerle became age-eligible for senior competition in 2011 and made her senior debut at the Maribor World Challenge Cup, placing fifth on floor exercise and sixth on balance beam. She was selected to compete at the World Championships in Tokyo with teammates Barbara Gasser and Lisa Ecker and finished ninety-sixth in the all-around during the qualification round with a total score of 48.798. Then at the Ostrava World Cup, she placed fourth on floor exercise and eighth on uneven bars.

=== 2012 ===
Hämmerle was a member of the gold medal-winning team at the Austrian Team Open, and she won the individual all-around gold with a score of 53.324. Then at the Osijek World Challenge Cup, she placed sixth on the uneven bars and seventh on the floor exercise. She was then selected to compete at the European Championships in Brussels where the Austrian team finished twentieth in the qualification round.

=== 2013 ===
Hämmerle qualified for the all-around finals at the European Championships in Moscow and finished twenty-third with a total score of 49.932. The next week she competed at the Ljubljana World Challenge Cup and finished sixth on vault and eighth on the uneven bars. In August, she finished nineteenth in the all-around at the Dutch Invitational. Then at the Osijek World Challenge Cup, she finished eighth on the floor exercise. She then competed at the World Championships in Antwerp and finished fortieth in the all-around during the qualification round with a total score of 50.773. Her final competition of the year was the Sokol Grand Prix where she competed on a mixed team with Michael Fussenegger that finished fourth.

=== 2014 ===
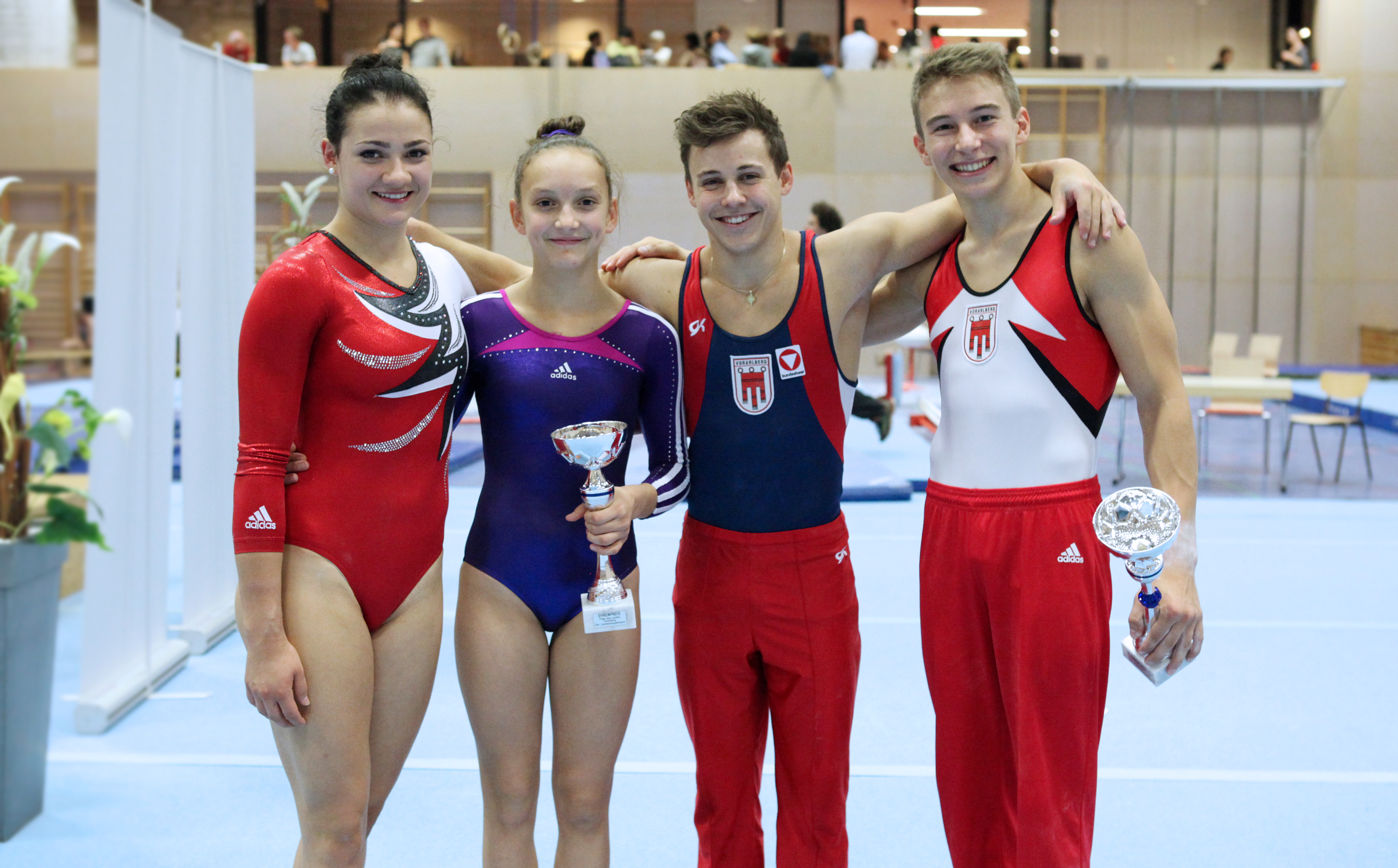
Hämmerle (left) in 2014

Hämmerle tied with Polish gymnast Gabriela Janik for the all-around silver medal at the International Women competition in Brno, Czech Republic, and Austria won the team bronze medal. Then at the European Championships, she led the Austrian team to a fourteenth-place finish. She won her first two FIG World Cup at the Anadia World Challenge Cup with a silver medal on vault behind Teja Belak and a bronze medal on the uneven bars behind Jessica López and Ana Filipa Martins. At a friendly meet against France and the Netherlands, the Austrian team finished third, and Hämmerle placed seventh in the all-around. Then at the World Championships, she helped the Austrian team place twenty-second, the country's best result at the World Artistic Gymnastics Championships since 1983. After the World Championships, she won the all-around silver medal at the Austrian Championships behind Lisa Ecker. In the event finals, she won gold on vault and balance beam and silver on floor exercise, and she placed fourth on uneven bars.

=== 2015 ===
Hämmerle began her 2015 season at the Austrian Team Open, finishing seventh with her team and thirteenth in the all-around. At the Anadia World Challenge Cup, she placed fifth on both the uneven bars and the balance beam. She then helped Austria win a friendly meet against Poland and Hungary. Then at the Austrian Championships, she won the all-around silver medal behind Lisa Ecker. In the event finals, she won silver on vault and floor exercise and bronze on uneven bars. At the 2015 World Championships, the Austrian team placed twenty-third and Hämmerle scored a personal-best 53.431 in the all-around.

=== 2016 ===
Hämmerle won a bronze medal on the balance beam at the Baku World Challenge Cup behind Flávia Saraiva and Emma Larsson. Then at the Austrian Team Open, she placed fifth with her team and in the all-around. She then helped her team place sixth at the DTB Team Challenge in Stuttgart. She finished fifteenth in the all-around at the Belgium Friendly with a total score of 52.200. She was scheduled to compete at the Olympic Test Event with a chance to qualify an individual spot for the 2016 Olympics, but she tore her Achilles tendon during podium training and withdrew.

=== 2017 ===
Hämmerle returned to training in February 2017. She returned to competition in September at the Paris World Challenge Cup, only competing on the uneven bars and balance beam and not making either final. Then in November, she won the gold medal on the uneven bars at the Austrian Championships.

=== 2018 ===
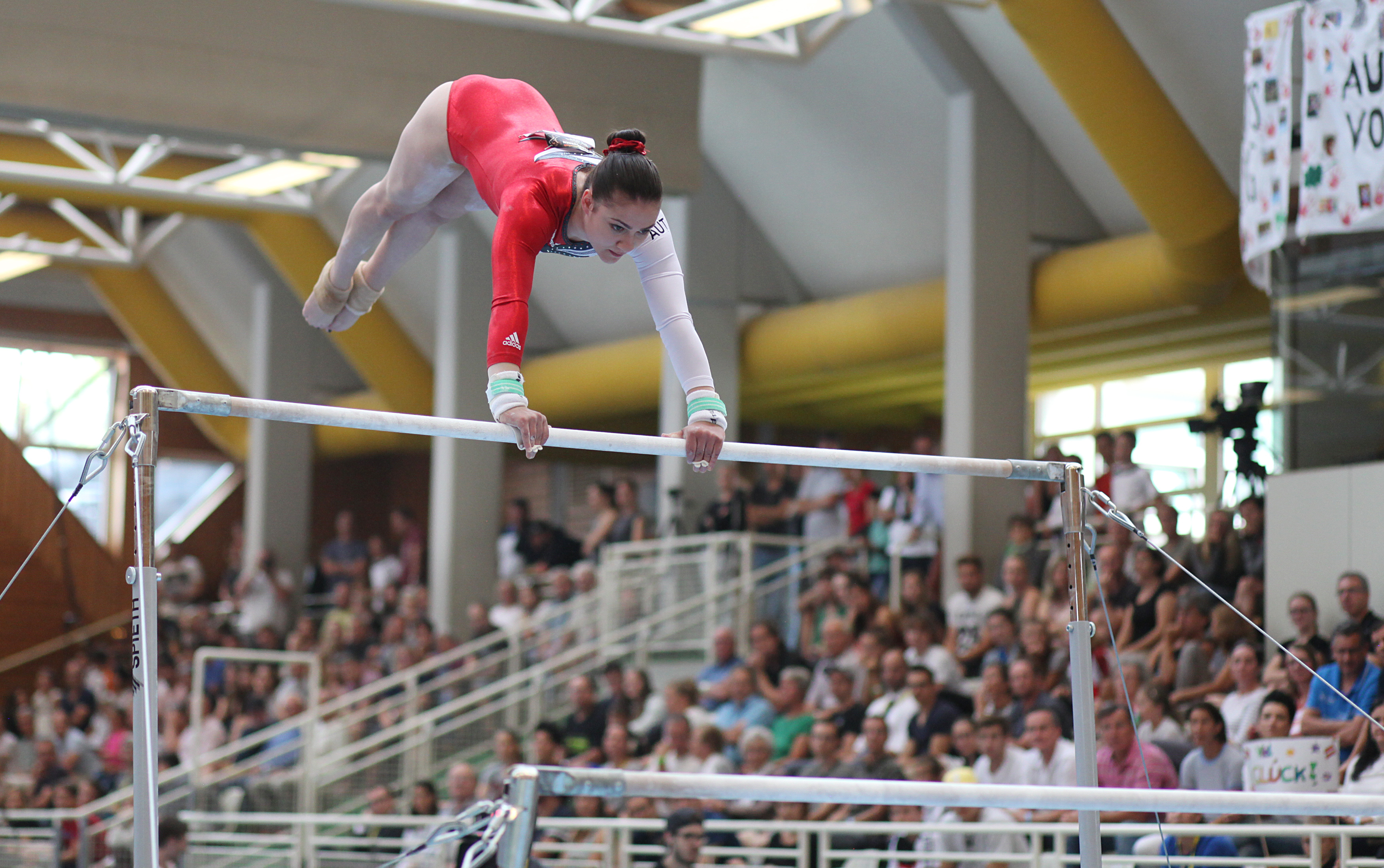
Hämmerle competing on the uneven bars at the 2018 Austrian Championships

Hämmerle began her 2018 season at the Austrian Team Open helping the Austrian team place fourth. Then at the Austrian Championships in Wolfurt, she won gold medals on both the uneven bars and balance beam. She then competed at the Budapest Friendly where the Austrian team finished fourth. She was selected to compete at the European Championships in Glasgow helping the Austrian team place twenty-third. At the Szombathely World Challenge Cup, she won the bronze medal on the balance beam behind Zsófia Kovács and Cintia Rodriguez and also placed fourth on the uneven bars. At the World Championships in Doha, she helped the Austrian team finish twenty-seventh.

=== 2019 ===
In March, Hämmerle helped the Austrian team place fourth at the Austrian Team Open. She relocated from Austria to the Netherlands in April 2019 in order to train at SV PAX Haarlemermeer with coaches Patrick Kiens and Daymon Montaigne-Jones who also coach Eythora Thorsdottir and Mandy Mohamed. Then in August, she returned to competing on all four events for the first time since 2016 at the Heerenveen Friendly and placed twelfth. At the World Championships in Stuttgart, she finished fifty-fifth in the all-around and qualified for an individual spot for the 2020 Olympic Games.

=== 2020-2021 ===
In November 2020 at the Austrian Championships, Hämmerle won the all-around and uneven bars silver medal and the floor exercise gold medal, and she placed fifth on the balance beam. She qualified for the balance beam final at the 2020 European Championships in eighth place with a score of 12.066, becoming the first Austrian gymnast to qualify for an apparatus final at the European Women's Artistic Gymnastics Championships. She was also the second reserve for both the uneven bars and floor exercise finals. In the balance beam event final, she fell twice and finished in eighth place.

Prior to the Olympic Games, Hämmerle competed at the 2021 FIT Challenge in Ghent and finished twenty-ninth in the all-around. She represented Austria at the 2020 Summer Olympics in Tokyo, Japan, and placed sixty-sixth in the all-around during the qualification round with a total score of 48.933.

== Personal life ==
Hämmerle has been a member of the Austrian Armed Forces since 2017 as a sports soldier. In 2022, she began studying in the Master of Advanced Studies in Sport Administration and Technology program at the International Academy of Sport Science and Technology in Lausanne, Switzerland and received an athlete scholarship.

== Competitive history ==
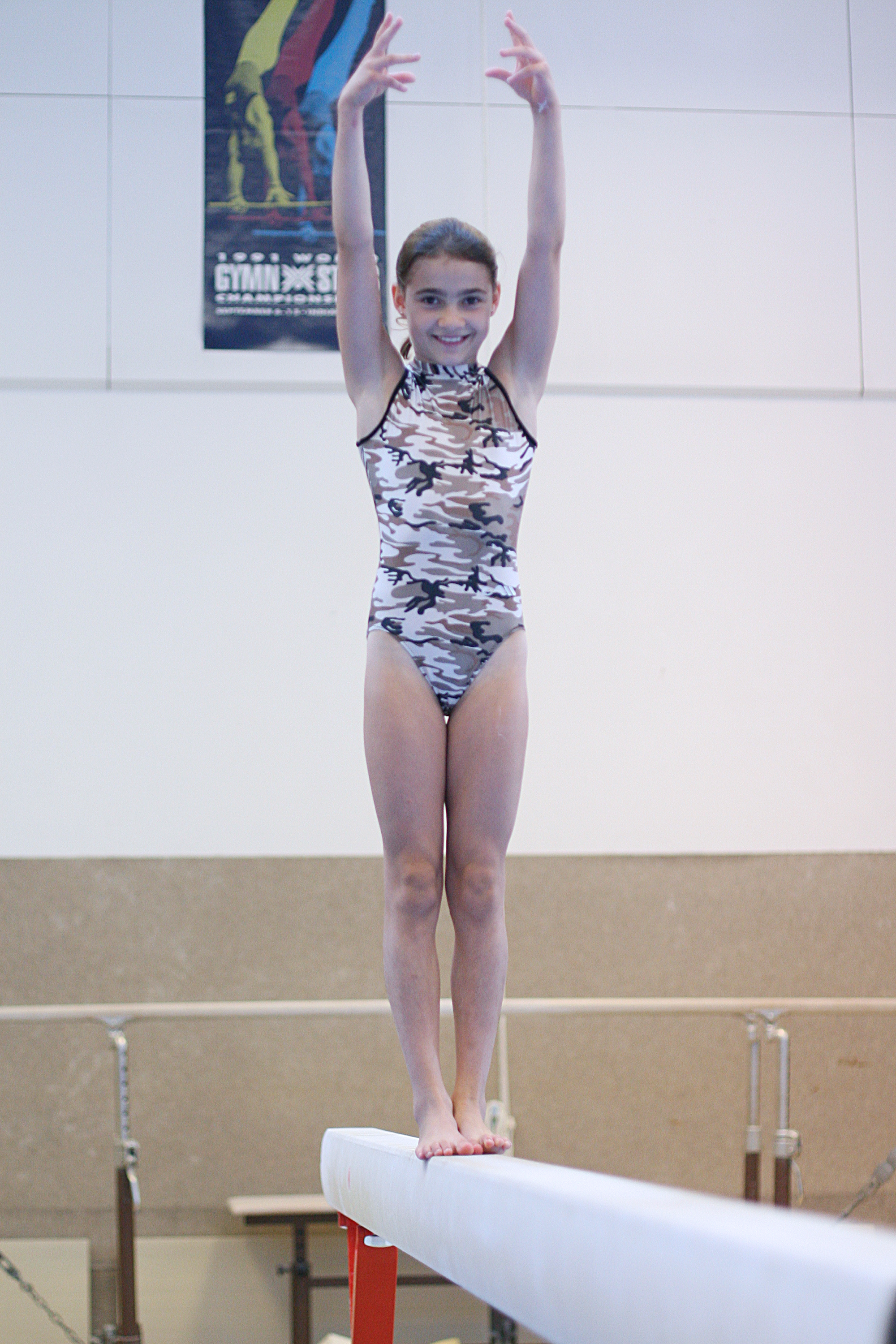
Hämmerle in 2007

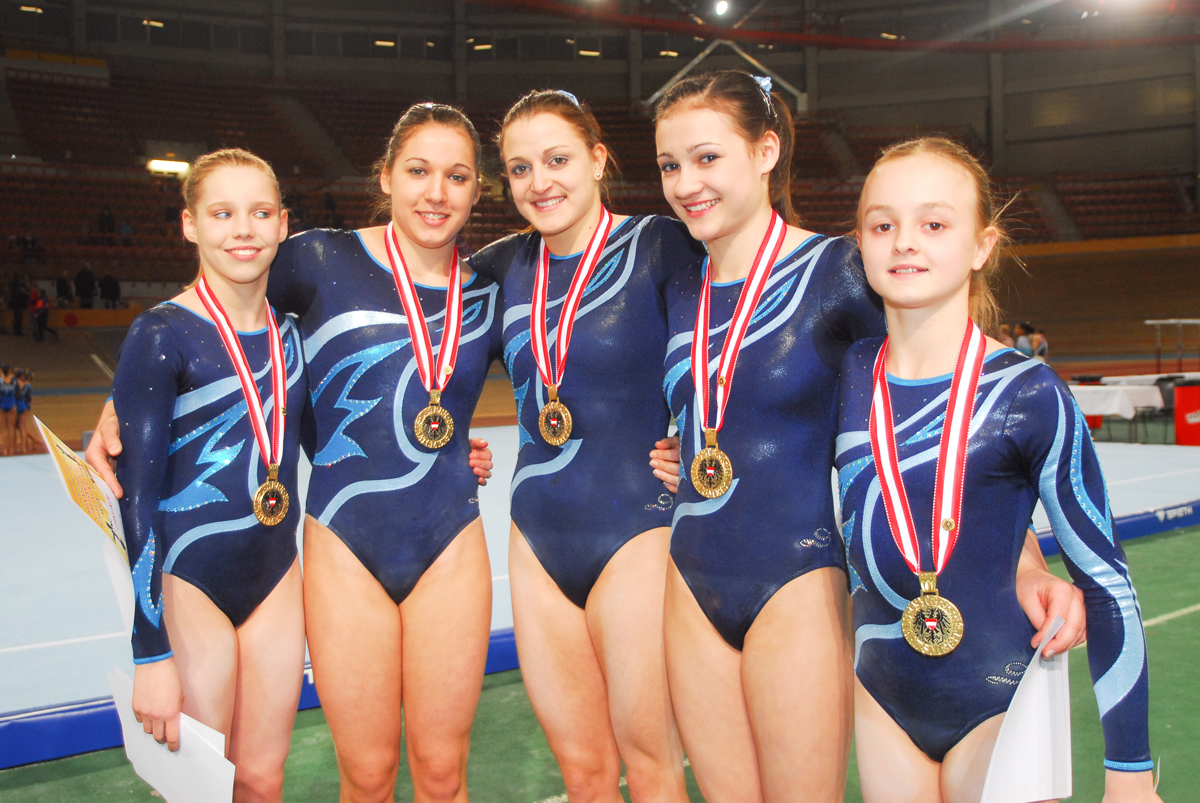
Hämmerle (second from the right) in 2011

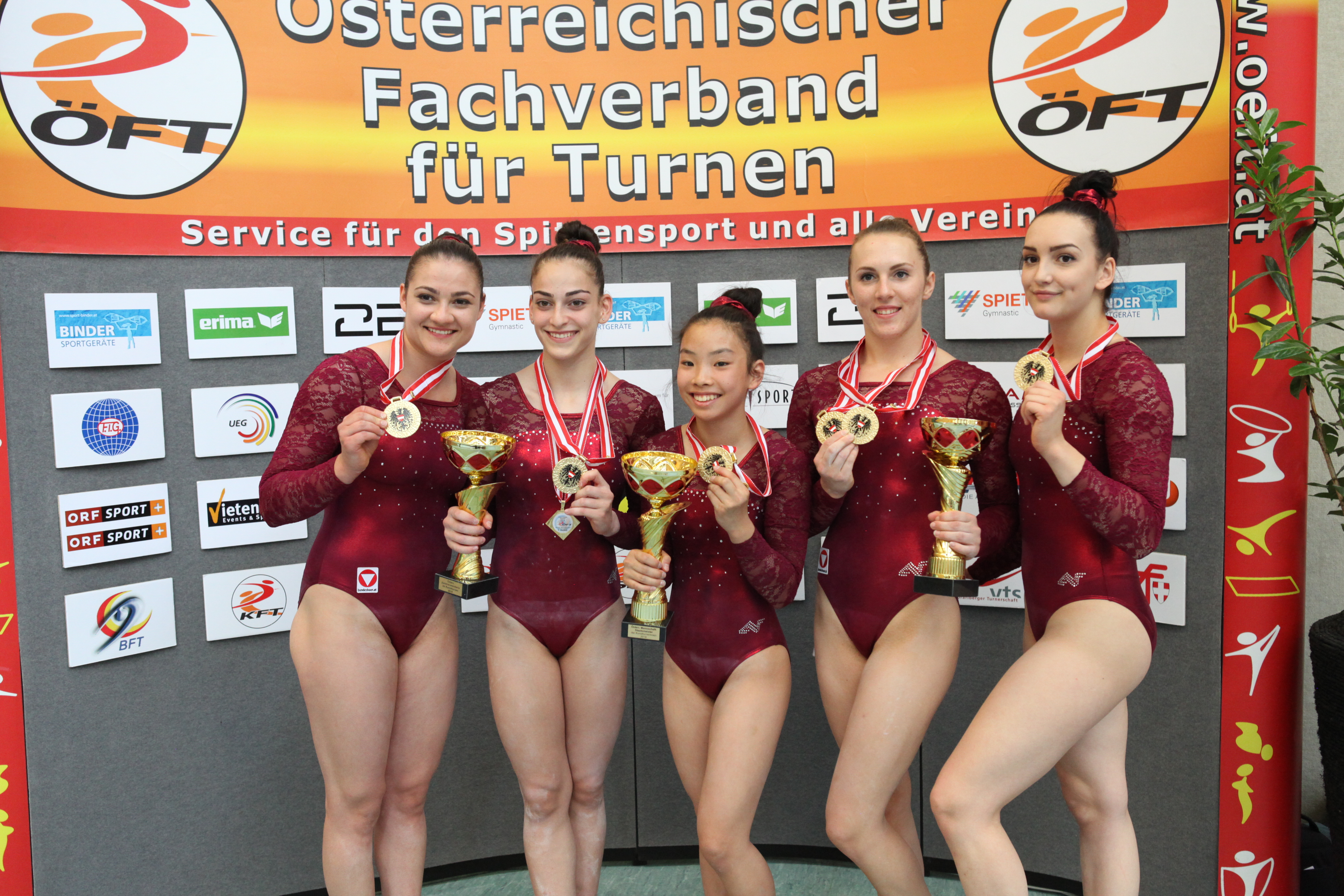
Hämmerle (left) at the 2018 Austrian Championships

Year	Event	Team	AA	VT	UB	BB	FX
Junior
2010
2010	Youth Olympic Games		12				
Senior
2011	Maribor World Challenge Cup					6	5
2011	World Championships		96				
2011	Ostrava World Cup				8		4
2012	Austrian Team Open	1st place, gold medalist(s)	1st place, gold medalist(s)				
2012	Osijek World Challenge Cup				6		7
2012	European Championships	20					
2013
2013	European Championships		23				
2013	Ljubljana World Challenge Cup			6	8		
2013	Dutch Invitational		19				
2013	Osijek World Challenge Cup						8
2013	World Championships		40				
2013	Sokol Grand Prix	4					
2014	International Women	3rd place, bronze medalist(s)	2nd place, silver medalist(s)				
2014	European Championships	14					
2014	Anadia World Challenge Cup			2nd place, silver medalist(s)	3rd place, bronze medalist(s)		
2014	Recontre Internationale	3rd place, bronze medalist(s)	7				
2014	World Championships	22					
2014	Austrian Championships		2nd place, silver medalist(s)	1st place, gold medalist(s)	4	1st place, gold medalist(s)	2nd place, silver medalist(s)
2015	Austrian Team Open	7	13				
2015	Anadia World Challenge Cup				5	5	
2015	Austria-Hungary-Poland Friendly	1st place, gold medalist(s)					
2015	Austrian Championships		2nd place, silver medalist(s)	2nd place, silver medalist(s)	3rd place, bronze medalist(s)		2nd place, silver medalist(s)
2015	World Championships	23					
2016	Baku World Challenge Cup					3rd place, bronze medalist(s)	
2016	Austrian Team Open	5	5				
2016	DTB Team Challenge	6					
2016	Belgium Friendly		15				
2016	Olympic Test Event		WD				
2017	Austrian Championships				1st place, gold medalist(s)		
2018	Austrian Team Open	4					
2018	Austrian Championships				1st place, gold medalist(s)	1st place, gold medalist(s)	
2018	Budapest Friendly	4					
2018	European Championships	23					
2018	Szombathely World Challenge Cup				4	3rd place, bronze medalist(s)	
2018	World Championships	27					
2019	Austrian Team Open	4					
2019	Heerenveen Friendly		12				
2019	World Championships		55				
2020	Austrian Championships		2nd place, silver medalist(s)		2nd place, silver medalist(s)	5	1st place, gold medalist(s)
2020	European Championships				R2	8	R2
2021	FIT Challenge		29				
2021	Olympic Games		66				
