= Julien Gobaux =

French artistic gymnast

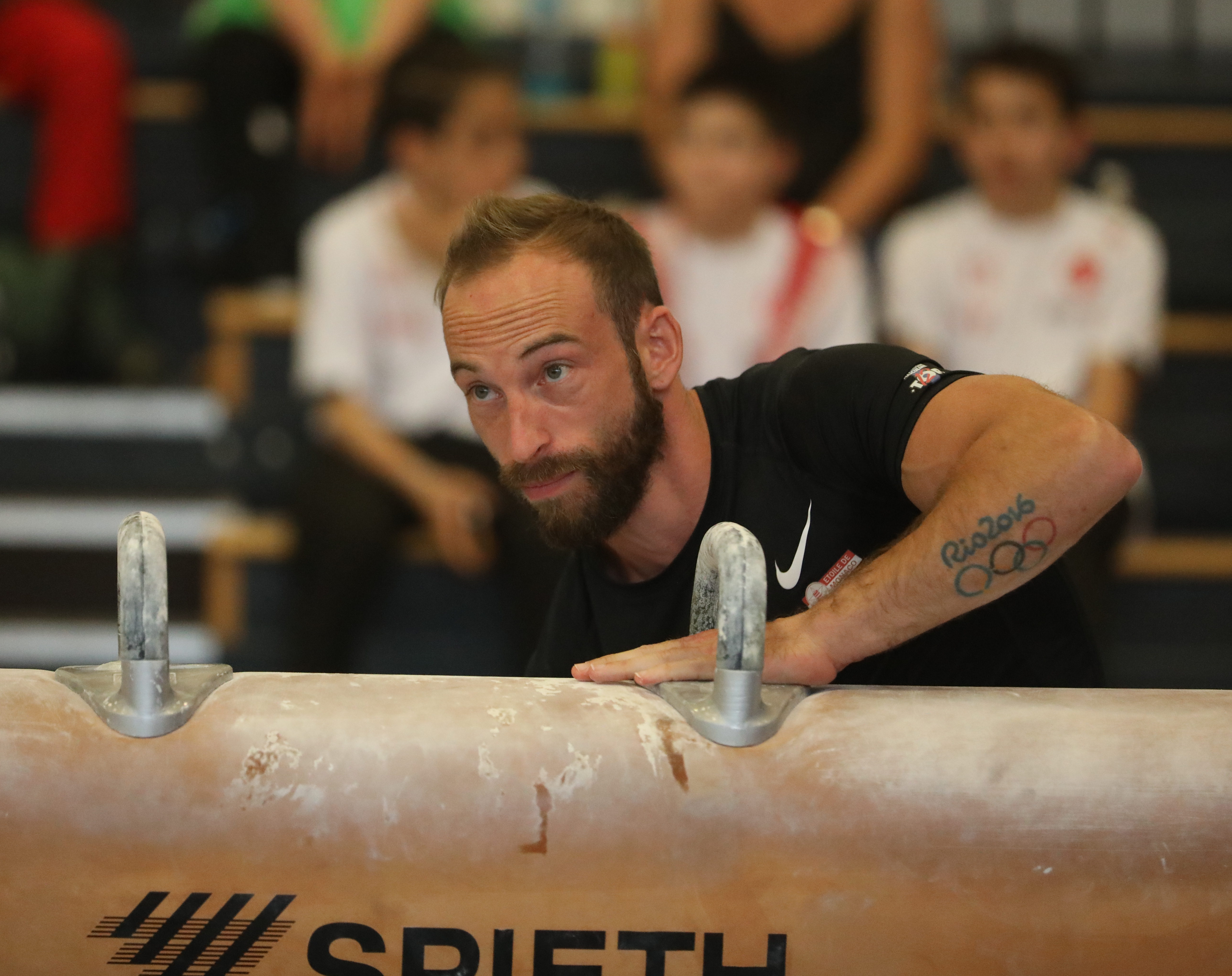
- Julien Gobaux, 2023

Personal information
- Full name: Julien Jean-Marc Gilbert Gobaux
- Born: 11 December 1990 (age 35) Soissons, France
- Height: 1.67 m (5 ft 6 in)

Gymnastics career
- Discipline: Men's artistic gymnastics
- Country represented: France; (2014)
- Former countries represented: Monaco
- Club: L'Etoile de Monaco
- Head coach: Thierry Aymes
Medal record
Men's artistic gymnastics
Representing France
European Championships
Bronze medal – third place	2018 Glasgow	Team
Mediterranean Games
Silver medal – second place	2018 Tarragona	All-around
Bronze medal – third place	2018 Tarragona	Team
Bronze medal – third place	2018 Tarragona	Parallel bars
Representing Monaco
Games of the Small States of Europe
Gold medal – first place	2013 Luxembourg	Team
Gold medal – first place	2013 Luxembourg	All-Around
Gold medal – first place	2013 Luxembourg	Parallel bars
Gold medal – first place	2013 Luxembourg	Vault
Silver medal – second place	2013 Luxembourg	Horizontal bar
Silver medal – second place	2013 Luxembourg	Pommel horse

Julien Jean-Marc Gilbert Gobaux (born 11 December 1990) is a French male artistic gymnast and a member of the national team. He participated at the 2014 World Artistic Gymnastics Championships in Nanjing, China, and qualified for the 2016 Summer Olympics.

== Biography ==
Julien Gobaux plays for the Étoile de Monaco club, which qualified for the 2015 French National Division 2 Championship. In 2013, he won the all-around competition at the 15th Games of the Small States of Europe held in Luxembourg. He also took first place in the team competition, as well as in the individual apparatus competitions on the vault and parallel bars. He won the silver medal on the pommel horse and the horizontal bar.

In May 2015, he competed in the World Cup event in Varna, Bulgaria, and took part in his first international final on the parallel bars, where he finished 6th.

After dominating the French Elite Championships in June 2016 with no fewer than five medals, including three golds (all-around, floor exercise, and parallel bars), his selection for the French national team for the 2016 Rio Olympics was confirmed two weeks later.

He won the bronze medal in the team event at the 2018 Mediterranean Games.

He won a bronze medal in the team event at the 2018 European Men's Artistic Gymnastics Championships in Glasgow alongside Axel Augis, Loris Frasca, Edgar Boulet, and Cyril Tommasone.
