= Gymnastics at the 2015 Games of the Small States of Europe =

Gymnastics at the 2015 Games of the Small States of Europe will take place 2–3 June 2015 at the Laugaból Ármann Gymnastic Hall in Reykjavík, Iceland.

== Medal summary ==
=== Medal table ===
* Host nation (Iceland)

Rank	Nation	Gold	Silver	Bronze	Total
1	Cyprus	7	1	4	12
2	Iceland*	6	8	2	16
3	Luxembourg	1	3	3	7
4	Malta	0	2	2	4
5	Monaco	0	1	3	4
Totals (5 entries)		14	15	14	43

=== Medalists ===
Event	Gold	Silver	Bronze
Men
Team all-around	Cyprus	Iceland	Monaco
Individual all-around	Marios Georgiou (CYP)	Michalis Krasias (CYP)	Valgarð Reinhardsson (ISL)
Floor	Sascha Palgen (LUX)	Valgarð Reinhardsson (ISL)	Marios Georgiou (CYP)
Pommel horse	Marios Georgiou (CYP)	Sascha Palgen (LUX)	Michalis Krasias (CYP)
Rings	Irodotos Georgallas (CYP)	Sascha Palgen (LUX)	Michalis Krasias (CYP)
Vault	Marios Georgiou (CYP)	Valgarð Reinhardsson (ISL)	Eydor Baldursson (ISL)
Parallel bars	Marios Georgiou (CYP)	Valgarð Reinhardsson (ISL); Sascha Palgen (LUX)	
Horizontal bar	Marios Georgiou (CYP)	Olafur Gunnarsson (ISL)	Michalis Krasias (CYP)
Women
Team all-around	Iceland	Malta	Luxembourg
Individual all-around	Dominiqua Belanyi (ISL)	Thelma Hermannsdottir (ISL)	Lisa Pastoret (LUX)
Vault	Norma Róbertsdóttir (ISL)	Sigríður Bergþórsdóttir (ISL)	Lisa Pastoret (LUX)
Uneven bars	Dominiqua Belanyi (ISL)	Peppijna Dalli (MLT)	Elodie Mont Roches (MON)
Balance beam	Norma Róbertsdóttir (ISL)	Milla Fabre (MON)	Suzanne Buttigieg (MLT)
Floor	Thelma Hermannsdottir (ISL)	Sigríður Bergþórsdóttir (ISL)	Claire Azzopardi (MLT); Elodie Mont Roches (MON)

== Men's results ==
=== Team competition ===
Rank	Nation	Floor (gymnastics)	Pommel horse	Rings (gymnastics)	Vault (gymnastics)	Parallel bars	Horizontal bar	Total
1st place, gold medalist(s)	Cyprus	40.400	41.200	41.050	42.050	41.950	40.500	247.150
2nd place, silver medalist(s)	Iceland	40.650	34.600	38.950	40.250	39.400	38.250	232.100
3rd place, bronze medalist(s)	Monaco	38.150	35.800	36.850	38.750	37.950	33.100	220.600
4	Luxembourg	24.900	24.150	24.100	25.750	25.950	22.750	147.600

=== Individual all-around ===
Rank	Gymnast	Floor (gymnastics)	Pommel horse	Rings (gymnastics)	Vault (gymnastics)	Parallel bars	Horizontal bar	Total
1st place, gold medalist(s)	Marios Georgiou (CYP)	14.100	14.650	13.300	14.700	14.650	14.600	86.000
2nd place, silver medalist(s)	Michalis Krasias (CYP)	13.250	12.650	13.650	13.900	14.050	13.200	80.700
3rd place, bronze medalist(s)	Valgarð Reinhardsson (ISL)	14.050	11.750	12.750	14.250	13.450	13.350	79.600
4	Sascha Palgen (LUX)	12.600	13.250	13.650	13.900	13.500	11.900	78.800
5	Loris Racca (MON)	12.500	12.150	12.450	13.100	12.400	10.900	73.500
6	Frédéric Unternaehr (MON)	12.950	11.800	12.400	13.000	12.800	8.600	71.550
7	Paul Alexis Ranc (MON)	12.700	9.700	12.000	12.650	12.750	10.800	70.600
8	Tom Steichen (LUX)	12.300	10.900	10.450	11.850	12.450	10.850	68.800
9	Irodotos Georgallas (CYP)	13.050	11.500	14.100	13.450	13.250	0.000	65.350
10	Eyþór Baldursson (ISL)	13.000	0.000	11.750	13.200	12.800	11.900	62.650
11	Bjarki Ásgeirsson (ISL)	13.600	8.700	12.950	12.400	11.450	10.800	59.100
12	Ólafur Gunnarsson (ISL)	0.000	11.050	13.250	0.000	13.150	13.000	50.450
13	Dimitris Krasias (CYP)	11.600	13.900	0.000	0.000	11.550	12.700	49.750
14	Hrannur Jónsson (ISL)	11.950	11.800	0.000	12.800	0.000	11.150	47.700
15	Yann Franc de Ferriere (MON)	11.950	0.000	10.400	11.450	12.350	0.000	46.150
16	Lilian Piotte (MON)	0.000	11.850	0.000	0.000	0.000	11.400	23.250

=== Floor ===
Rank	Gymnast	Nation	Total
Gold medal	Sascha Palgen	Luxembourg	14.350
Silver medal	Valgarð Reinhardsson	Iceland	14.300
Bronze medal	Marios Georgiou	Cyprus	14.050
4	Michalis Krasias	Cyprus	13.700
5	Loris Racca	Monaco	12.800
6	Frédéric Unternaehr	Monaco	12.750
7	Tom Steichen	Luxembourg	12.300
8	Bjarki Ásgeirsson	Iceland	11.750

=== Pommel horse ===
Rank	Gymnast	Nation	Total
Gold medal	Marios Georgiou	Cyprus	14.500
Silver medal	Sascha Palgen	Luxembourg	13.200
Bronze medal	Michalis Krasias	Cyprus	12.650
4	Valgarð Reinhardsson	Iceland	12.550
5	Loris Racca	Monaco	12.050
6	Hrannur Jónsson	Iceland	11.100
7	Tom Steichen	Luxembourg	10.600
8	Lilian Piotte	Monaco	9.750

=== Rings ===
Rank	Gymnast	Nation	Total
Gold medal	Irodotos Georgallas	Cyprus	14.100
Silver medal	Sascha Palgen	Luxembourg	12.950
Bronze medal	Michalis Krasias	Cyprus	12.750
4	Ólafur Gunnarsson	Iceland	12.650
5	Bjarki Ásgeirsson	Iceland	12.550
6	Frédéric Unternaehr	Monaco	12.300
7	Paul Alexis Ranc	Monaco	12.250
8	Tom Steichen	Luxembourg	10.500

=== Vault ===
Rank	Gymnast	Nation	Total
Gold medal	Marios Georgiou	Cyprus	14.550
Silver medal	Valgarð Reinhardsson	Iceland	14.250
Bronze medal	Eyþór Baldursson	Iceland	13.350
4	Tom Steichen	Luxembourg	13.300
5	Frédéric Unternaehr	Monaco	13.050
6	Loris Racca	Monaco	13.000

=== Parallel bars ===
Rank	Gymnast	Nation	Total
Gold medal	Marios Georgiou	Cyprus	14.200
Silver medal	Valgarð Reinhardsson	Iceland	13.400
Silver medal	Sascha Palgen	Luxembourg	13.400
4	Paul Alexis Ranc	Monaco	13.050
5	Michalis Krasias	Cyprus	12.900
6	Ólafur Gunnarsson	Iceland	12.850
7	Tom Steichen	Luxembourg	12.650
8	Loris Racca	Monaco	12.000

=== Horizontal bar ===
Rank	Gymnast	Nation	Total
Gold medal	Marios Georgiou	Cyprus	14.250
Silver medal	Ólafur Gunnarsson	Iceland	12.950
Bronze medal	Michalis Krasias	Cyprus	12.100
4	Frédéric Unternaehr	Monaco	11.700
5	Lilian Piotte	Monaco	11.350
6	Valgarð Reinhardsson	Iceland	10.750
7	Tom Steichen	Luxembourg	10.400
8	Sascha Palgen	Luxembourg	0.000

== Women's results ==
=== Team competition ===
Rank	Nation	Vault (gymnastics)	Uneven bars	Balance beam	Floor (gymnastics)	Total
1st place, gold medalist(s)	Iceland	40.950	34.600	35.500	38.000	149.050
2nd place, silver medalist(s)	Malta	39.000	28.700	34.750	35.100	137.550
3rd place, bronze medalist(s)	Luxembourg	38.900	29.100	34.100	34.100	136.200
4	Monaco	35.050	22.450	30.900	32.250	120.650
5	Cyprus	24.500	14.450	20.600	22.700	82.250
6	Andorra	12.750	8.250	10.400	11.600	43.000

=== Individual all-around ===
Rank	Gymnast	Vault (gymnastics)	Uneven bars	Balance beam	Floor (gymnastics)	Total
1st place, gold medalist(s)	Dominqua Belányi (ISL)	13.150	12.550	11.800	12.400	49.900
2nd place, silver medalist(s)	Thelma Hermannsdóttir (ISL)	13.250	10.500	11.850	12.800	48.400
3rd place, bronze medalist(s)	Lisa Pastoret (LUX)	12.950	9.350	12.100	11.700	46.100
4	Kirsty Caruana (MLT)	12.850	9.200	11.250	11.150	44.450
5	Elodie Mont Roches (MON)	11.800	10.800	9.650	11.650	43.900
6	Chloe Marie Baltenneck Tixador (AND)	12.750	8.250	10.400	11.600	43.000
7	Eleni Eliades (CYP)	12.800	8.650	9.750	11.350	42.550
8	Cindy Staar (LUX)	12.700	7.400	10.700	11.400	42.200
9	Rafaella Zannettou (CYP)	11.700	5.800	10.850	11.350	39.700
10	Jemma Gorski (MON)	11.950	7.700	10.050	9.800	39.500
11	Sana Grillo (MLT)	12.650	3.150	11.950	11.600	39.350
12	Norma Róbertsdóttir (ISL)	14.000	0.000	11.850	12.250	38.100
13	Milla Fabre (MON)	11.300	3.950	11.200	10.800	37.250
14	Sigríður Bergþórsdóttir (ISL)	13.700	9.450	0.000	12.800	35.950
15	Alona Albrecht (LUX)	13.000	0.000	11.300	11.000	35.300
16	Claire Azzopardi (MLT)	12.750	0.000	10.600	11.700	35.050
17	Nathalie Vicente Simoes (LUX)	12.950	9.200	9.950	0.000	32.100
18	Suzanne Buttigieg (MLT)	0.000	8.050	11.550	11.800	31.400
19	Peppijna Dalli (MLT)	13.400	11.450	0.000	0.000	24.850
20	Tinna Óðinsdóttir (ISL)	0.000	11.550	11.750	0.000	23.300
21	Christelle Timis (LUX)	0.000	10.550	0.000	9.650	20.200

=== Vault ===
Rank	Gymnast	Nation	Total
Gold medal	Norma Róbertsdóttir	Iceland	14.000
Silver medal	Sigríður Bergþórsdóttir	Iceland	13.450
Bronze medal	Lisa Pastoret	Luxembourg	12.900
4	Kirsty Caruana	Malta	12.850
5	Nathalie Vicente Simoes	Luxembourg	12.700
6	Eleni Eliades	Cyprus	12.550
6	Jemma Gorski	Monaco	12.550
8	Peppijna Dalli	Malta	12.000

=== Uneven bars ===
Rank	Gymnast	Nation	Total
Gold medal	Dominqua Belányi	Iceland	12.600
Silver medal	Peppijna Dalli	Malta	11.800
Bronze medal	Elodie Mont Roches	Monaco	10.550
4	Christelle Timis	Luxembourg	10.350
5	Tinna Óðinsdóttir	Iceland	10.100
6	Lisa Pastoret	Luxembourg	9.800
7	Kirsty Caruana	Malta	9.200
8	Eleni Eliades	Cyprus	7.650

=== Balance beam ===
Rank	Gymnast	Nation	Total
Gold medal	Norma Róbertsdóttir	Iceland	12.900
Silver medal	Milla Fabre	Monaco	12.250
Bronze medal	Suzanne Buttigieg	Malta	11.850
4	Alona Albrecht	Luxembourg	11.750
4	Sana Grillo	Malta	11.750
6	Thelma Hermannsdóttir	Iceland	11.550
7	Lisa Pastoret	Luxembourg	11.250
8	Rafaella Zannettou	Cyprus	8.400

=== Floor ===
Rank	Gymnast	Nation	Total
Gold medal	Thelma Hermannsdóttir	Iceland	13.300
Silver medal	Sigríður Bergþórsdóttir	Iceland	12.900
Bronze medal	Claire Azzopardi	Malta	11.800
Bronze medal	Elodie Mont Roches	Monaco	11.800
5	Suzanne Buttigieg	Malta	11.700
6	Lisa Pastoret	Luxembourg	11.500
7	Cindy Staar	Luxembourg	11.350
8	Chloe Marie Baltenneck Tixador	Andorra	11.000
