= Sascha Palgen =

Luxembourgish gymnast (born 1984)

- Born: 15 August 1984 (age 42) Esch-sur-Alzette
- Height: 1.76 m (5 ft 9 in)

Gymnastics career
- Discipline: Men's artistic gymnastics
- Country represented: Luxembourg
- Club: Etoile Rumelange (LUX); TT Stuttgart (GER)
- Head coaches: Gunter Schoenherr; Manfred Diehl
Medal record
Men's gymnastics
Representing Luxembourg
Games of the Small States of Europe
Gold medal – first place	2013 Luxembourg	Floor
Gold medal – first place	2015 Iceland	Floor
Silver medal – second place	2013 Luxembourg	Parallel bars
Silver medal – second place	2013 Luxembourg	Rings
Silver medal – second place	2015 Iceland	Pommel horse
Silver medal – second place	2015 Iceland	Rings
Silver medal – second place	2015 Iceland	Parallel bars
Bronze medal – third place	2013 Luxembourg	All-Around

Sascha Palgen (born 15 August 1984 in Esch-sur-Alzette) is a Luxembourgish gymnast, who represented his nation at the Olympics for the first time in his sporting discipline since 1964. He competed at the 2008 Summer Olympics in Beijing, where he finished thirty-seventh in the men's individual all-around event. He is also a member of Etoile Rumelange, a local gymnastics club in Luxembourg, and TT Stuttgart, under his coach Manfred Diehl. Palgen named as reserve for the 2012 Summer Olympics in London by qualifying for the Olympic test event, but did not compete at the games.

== Career achievements ==
- Finished fifth and sixth for the floor exercises at the Turnier der Meister in Cottbus, Germany, 2007 and 2008
- Thirty-seventh place in the individual all-around event at the 2008 Summer Olympics in Beijing
