= 2016 FIG Artistic Gymnastics World Cup series =

International gymnastics competition series

FIG Artistic Gymnastics World Cup series
- Location: various — see locations
- Date: February 19 – November 20, 2016 see schedule

The 2016 FIG Artistic Gymnastics World Cup series was a series of stages where events in men's and women's artistic gymnastics were contested.

== World Cup stages ==
Date	Event	Location	Type
19–21 February	AGF Trophy	Baku, Azerbaijan	C III – Apparatus
5 March	American Cup	Newark, United States	C II – All Around
12 March	Glasgow World Cup	Glasgow, United Kingdom	C II – All Around
19–20 March	DTB-Pokal World Cup	Stuttgart, Germany	C II – All Around
24–26 March	Doha World Challenge Cup	Doha, Qatar	C III – Apparatus
31 March – 3 April	Turnier Der Meister World Challenge Cup	Cottbus, Germany	C III – Apparatus
8–10 April	Ljubljana World Challenge Cup	Ljubljana, Slovenia	C III – Apparatus
28 April – 1 May	Osijek World Challenge Cup	Osijek, Croatia	C III – Apparatus
13–15 May	Varna World Challenge Cup	Varna, Bulgaria	C III – Apparatus
20–22 May	São Paulo World Challenge Cup	São Paulo, Brazil	C III – Apparatus
23–26 June	Anadia World Challenge Cup	Anadia, Portugal	C III – Apparatus
1–2 July	Mersin World Challenge Cup	Mersin, Turkey	C III – Apparatus
7–9 October	Szombathely World Challenge Cup	Szombathely, Hungary	C III – Apparatus
17–20 November	Turnier der Meister World Cup	Cottbus, Germany	C III – Apparatus

== Medalists ==
=== Men ===
FIG World Cup
Competition	Event	Gold	Silver	Bronze
(United States) Newark	All-around	(Japan) Ryohei Kato	(United States) Donnell Whittenburg	(China) Wei Sun
(United Kingdom) Glasgow	All-around	(United Kingdom) Max Whitlock	(Brazil) Arthur Mariano	(United Kingdom) Daniel Purvis
(Germany) Stuttgart	All-around	(Germany) Andreas Bretschneider	(United States) Danell Leyva	(Russia) Nikolai Kuksenkov
(Germany) Cottbus	Floor exercise	(Japan) Naoto Hayasaka	(Spain) Rayderley Zapata	(Slovenia) Rok Klavora
(Germany) Cottbus	Pommel horse	(Hungary) Krisztián Berki	(Japan) Naoto Hayasaka	(Croatia) Robert Seligman
(Germany) Cottbus	Rings	(Ukraine) Igor Radivilov	(Japan) Yuya Kamoto	(Germany) Nick Klessing
(Germany) Cottbus	Vault	(Ukraine) Igor Radivilov	(Spain) Adria Vera Mora	(Finland) Tomi Tuuha
(Germany) Cottbus	Parallel bars	(Japan) Yuya Kamoto	(Slovenia) Alen Dimic	(Japan) Naoto Hayasaka
(Germany) Cottbus	Horizontal bar	(Germany) Andreas Bretschneider	(Japan) Yuya Kamoto	(Slovenia) Alen Dimic
FIG World Challenge Cup
Competition	Event	Gold	Silver	Bronze
(Azerbaijan) Baku	Floor exercise	(Japan) Kenzo Shirai	(Slovenia) Rok Klavora	(Israel) Alexander Shatilov
(Azerbaijan) Baku	Pommel horse	(Japan) Tomomasa Hasegawa	(Belgium) Maxime Gentges	(Iran) Saeid Reza Keikha
(Azerbaijan) Baku	Rings	(Turkey) İbrahim Çolak	(Japan) Kazuma Kaya	(Azerbaijan) Oleg Stepko
(Azerbaijan) Baku	Vault	(Japan) Kenzo Shirai	(Azerbaijan) Oleg Stepko	(Turkey) Ahmet Önder
(Azerbaijan) Baku	Parallel bars	(Azerbaijan) Oleg Stepko	(Turkey) Ferhat Arıcan	(Japan) Kazuma Kaya
(Azerbaijan) Baku	Horizontal bar	(Japan) Tomomasa Hasegawa	(Turkey) Ahmet Önder	(Croatia) Tin Srbić
(Qatar) Doha	Floor exercise	(Brazil) Diego Hypólito	(Slovenia) Rok Klavora	(United Kingdom) Sam Oldham
(Qatar) Doha	Pommel horse	(Armenia) Harutyun Merdinyan	(Croatia) Robert Seligman	(Azerbaijan) Oleg Stepko (Slovenia) Sašo Bertoncelj
(Qatar) Doha	Rings	(Greece) Eleftherios Petrounias	(Armenia) Davtyan Vahagn	(Armenia) Artur Tovmasyan
(Qatar) Doha	Vault	(China) Huang Mingqi	(Australia) Christopher Remkes	(Brazil) Diego Hypólito
(Qatar) Doha	Parallel bars	(Azerbaijan) Oleg Stepko	(Cuba) Manrique Larduet	(Vietnam) Phạm Phước Hưng
(Qatar) Doha	Horizontal bar	(Japan) Fuya Maeno	(United Kingdom) Ashley Watson	(Croatia) Marijo Možnik
(Germany) Cottbus	Floor exercise	(Brazil) Diego Hypólito	(Slovenia) Rok Klavora	(Ukraine) Oleg Verniaiev
(Germany) Cottbus	Pommel horse	(United Kingdom) Louis Smith	(Ukraine) Oleg Verniaiev	(Slovenia) Sašo Bertoncelj (Mexico) Daniel Corral
(Germany) Cottbus	Rings	(Ukraine) Igor Radivilov	(Brazil) Henrique Flores	(Belgium) Dennis Goossens
(Germany) Cottbus	Vault	(Ukraine) Oleg Verniaiev	(China) Qu Ruiyang	(Switzerland) Benjamin Gischard
(Germany) Cottbus	Parallel bars	(Germany) Marcel Nguyen	(Switzerland) Christian Baumann	(Germany) Lukas Dauser
(Germany) Cottbus	Horizontal bar	(Ukraine) Oleg Verniaiev	(Switzerland) Christian Baumann (Switzerland) Pablo Braegger	—N/a
(Slovenia) Ljubljana	Floor exercise	(Slovenia) Rok Klavora	(Slovenia) Ziga Silc	(Hungary) Mark Feher
(Slovenia) Ljubljana	Pommel horse	(Belarus) Vasili Mikhalitsyn	(Slovenia) Sašo Bertoncelj	(Croatia) Kristijan Vugrinski
(Slovenia) Ljubljana	Rings	(Turkey) İbrahim Çolak	(Ukraine) Yevgen Yudenkov	(Hungary) Norbert Dudas
(Slovenia) Ljubljana	Vault	(Belarus) Pavel Bulauski	(Latvia) Vitalijs Kardasovs	(Slovakia) Ivan Vargovsky
(Slovenia) Ljubljana	Parallel bars	(Slovenia) Alen Dimic	(Ukraine) Yevgen Yudenkov	(Turkey) İbrahim Çolak
(Slovenia) Ljubljana	Horizontal bar	(Turkey) Ümit Şamiloğlu	(Slovenia) Alen Dimic	(Hungary) David Vecsernyes (Croatia) Tin Srbić
(Croatia) Osijek	Floor exercise	(Germany) Matthias Fahrig	(Israel) Alexander Shatilov	(United States) Paul Ruggeri (United States) Steven Legendre
(Croatia) Osijek	Pommel horse	(Ukraine) Oleg Verniaiev	(Slovenia) Sašo Bertoncelj	(Slovakia) Slavomir Michnak
(Croatia) Osijek	Rings	(Russia) Denis Ablyazin	(Turkey) İbrahim Çolak	(Ukraine) Igor Radivilov
(Croatia) Osijek	Vault	(Ukraine) Oleg Verniaiev	(United States) Paul Ruggeri	(Ukraine) Igor Radivilov
(Croatia) Osijek	Parallel bars	(Russia) Emin Garibov	(Cuba) Manrique Larduet	(United States) Sean Melton
(Croatia) Osijek	Horizontal bar	(Turkey) Ümit Şamiloğlu	(United States) Paul Ruggeri	(Switzerland) Oliver Hegi (Croatia) Tin Srbić
(Bulgaria) Varna	Floor exercise	(Ukraine) Oleg Verniaiev	(Slovenia) Rok Klavora	(United Kingdom) Dominick Cunningham
(Bulgaria) Varna	Pommel horse	(Ukraine) Oleg Verniaiev	(Croatia) Robert Seligman (France) Cyril Tommasone	—N/a
(Bulgaria) Varna	Rings	(Ukraine) Igor Radivilov	(Ukraine) Oleg Verniaiev	(Russia) Daniil Kazachkov
(Bulgaria) Varna	Vault	(Ukraine) Igor Radivilov	(France) Zachari Hrimeche	(Israel) Andrey Medvedev
(Bulgaria) Varna	Parallel bars	(Ukraine) Oleg Verniaiev	(France) Axel Augis	(Russia) Dmitrii Lankin
(Bulgaria) Varna	Horizontal bar	(Belarus) Andrey Likhovitskiy	(Lithuania) Robert Tvorogal (Slovenia) Alen Dimic	—N/a
(Brazil) São Paulo	Floor exercise	(Chile) Tomás González	(Brazil) Diego Hypólito	(Japan) Jumpei Oka
(Brazil) São Paulo	Pommel horse	(Japan) Kaito Imabayashi	(Brazil) Sérgio Sasaki	(Japan) Fuya Maeno
(Brazil) São Paulo	Rings	(Brazil) Arthur Zanetti	(Argentina) Federico Molinari	(Japan) Kaito Imabayashi
(Brazil) São Paulo	Vault	(Brazil) Arthur Mariano	(Brazil) Sérgio Sasaki	(Japan) Jumpei Oka
(Brazil) São Paulo	Parallel bars	(Colombia) Jossimar Calvo	(Colombia) Javier Sandoval	(Brazil) Francisco Barreto
(Brazil) São Paulo	Horizontal bar	(Brazil) Sérgio Sasaki	(Japan) Kaito Imabayashi	(Argentina) Nicolás Córdoba
(Portugal) Anadia	Floor exercise	(Israel) Alexander Shatilov	(Japan) Wataru Tanigawa	(Japan) Shoichi Yamamoto
(Portugal) Anadia	Pommel horse	(China) Weng Hao	(Croatia) Filip Ude	(France) Cyril Tommasone
(Portugal) Anadia	Rings	(France) Samir Aït Saïd	(Japan) Kazuyuki Takeda	(France) Danny Rodrigues
(Portugal) Anadia	Vault	(China) Cen Yu	(Brazil) Sérgio Sasaki	(Japan) Wataru Tanigawa
(Portugal) Anadia	Parallel bars	(Azerbaijan) Oleg Stepko	(Colombia) Jossimar Calvo	(Cuba) Manrique Larduet
(Portugal) Anadia	Horizontal bar	(Colombia) Jossimar Calvo	(Japan) Kazuyuki Takeda	(Cuba) Randy Lerú
(Turkey) Mersin	Floor exercise	(Turkey) Ferhat Arıcan	(Colombia) Jossimar Calvo	(Turkey) Ahmet Önder
(Turkey) Mersin	Pommel horse	(Colombia) Jossimar Calvo	(Turkey) Ferhat Arıcan	(Jordan) Ahmad Abu al Soud
(Turkey) Mersin	Rings	(Turkey) İbrahim Çolak	(Colombia) Jossimar Calvo	(Iran) Reza Farnia
(Turkey) Mersin	Vault	(Turkey) Ahmet Önder	(Hong Kong) Man Hin Jim	(Colombia) Jossimar Calvo
(Turkey) Mersin	Parallel bars	(Turkey) Ferhat Arıcan	(Colombia) Jossimar Calvo	(Turkey) Ahmet Önder
(Turkey) Mersin	Horizontal bar	(Turkey) Ümit Şamiloğlu	(Colombia) Jossimar Calvo	(Turkey) Ahmet Önder
(Hungary) Szombathely	Floor exercise	(Guatemala) Jorge Vega	(Slovenia) Rok Klavora	(Japan) Yuto Kato
(Hungary) Szombathely	Pommel horse	(Hungary) Krisztián Berki	(China) Xiaoming Wu	(Ukraine) Illia Yehorov
(Hungary) Szombathely	Rings	(Egypt) Ali Zahran	(China) Yunlong Zhang	(Vietnam) Nam Dang
(Hungary) Szombathely	Vault	(Vietnam) Tuan Dat Nguyen	(Finland) Tomi Tuuha	(Guatemala) Jorge Vega
(Hungary) Szombathely	Parallel bars	(Vietnam) Phuong Thanh Dinh (China) Xiaoming Wu	—N/a	(Japan) Kenta Chiba
(Hungary) Szombathely	Horizontal bar	(Japan) Kenta Chiba	(Japan) Fuya Maeno	(Hungary) David Vecsernyes (Croatia) Tin Srbić

=== Women ===
FIG World Cup
Competition	Event	Gold	Silver	Bronze
(United States) Newark	All-around	(United States) Gabby Douglas	(United States) Maggie Nichols	(Canada) Ellie Black
(United Kingdom) Glasgow	All-around	(United States) MyKayla Skinner	(Germany) Elisabeth Seitz	(United Kingdom) Claudia Fragapane
(Germany) Stuttgart	All-around	(Germany) Sophie Scheder	(Canada) Isabela Onyshko	(United States) Amelia Hundley
(Germany) Cottbus	Vault	(Australia) Emily Little	(Hungary) Dorina Böczögő	(Hungary) Zsófia Kovács
(Germany) Cottbus	Uneven Bars	(Hungary) Zsófia Kovács	(Hungary) Dorina Böczögő	(Ukraine) Angelina Kysla
(Germany) Cottbus	Balance Beam	(Hungary) Zsófia Kovács	(Germany) Carina Kroell	(Hungary) Dorina Böczögő
(Germany) Cottbus	Floor Exercise	(Germany) Carina Kroell	(Germany) Leah Griesser	(Australia) Emily Little
FIG World Challenge Cup
Competition	Event	Gold	Silver	Bronze
(Azerbaijan) Baku	Vault	(Uzbekistan) Oksana Chusovitina	(Slovenia) Tjaša Kysselef	(Austria) Lisa Ecker
(Azerbaijan) Baku	Uneven Bars	(Germany) Lina Philipp	(Brazil) Daniele Hypólito	(Brazil) Flávia Saraiva
(Azerbaijan) Baku	Balance Beam	(Brazil) Flávia Saraiva	(Sweden) Emma Larsson	(Austria) Elisa Haemmerle
(Azerbaijan) Baku	Floor Exercise	(Brazil) Flávia Saraiva	(Sweden) Emma Larsson	(Azerbaijan) Marina Nekrasova
(Qatar) Doha	Vault	(Switzerland) Giulia Steingruber	(Slovenia) Teja Belak	(Slovenia) Tjaša Kysselef
(Qatar) Doha	Uneven Bars	(Sweden) Jonna Adlerteg	(Brazil) Rebeca Andrade	(Portugal) Ana Filipa Martins
(Qatar) Doha	Balance Beam	(Romania) Cătălina Ponor	(Brazil) Thauany Araujo	(Portugal) Ana Filipa Martins
(Qatar) Doha	Floor Exercise	(Switzerland) Giulia Steingruber	(Romania) Diana Bulimar	(Hungary) Zsófia Kovács
(Germany) Cottbus	Vault	(Uzbekistan) Oksana Chusovitina	(China) Wu Jing	(Slovenia) Tjaša Kysselef
(Germany) Cottbus	Uneven Bars	(Germany) Sophie Scheder	(China) Zhu Xiaofang	(Poland) Gabriela Janik
(Germany) Cottbus	Balance Beam	(Poland) Katarzyna Jurkowska	(Germany) Sophie Scheder	(Netherlands) Sanne Wevers
(Germany) Cottbus	Floor Exercise	(Netherlands) Lisa Top	(Poland) Katarzyna Jurkowska	(Germany) Sophie Scheder
(Slovenia) Ljubljana	Vault	(Puerto Rico) Paula Mejias	(Slovenia) Teja Belak	(Slovenia) Tjaša Kysselef
(Slovenia) Ljubljana	Uneven Bars	(Slovenia) Ivana Kamnikar	(Malaysia) Farah Abdul	(Slovenia) Teja Belak
(Slovenia) Ljubljana	Balance Beam	(Malaysia) Yueh Tan Ing	(Slovenia) Adela Šajn	(Canada) Sydney Soloski
(Slovenia) Ljubljana	Floor Exercise	(Malaysia) Tracie Ang	(Canada) Sydney Soloski	(Hungary) Dorina Böczögő
(Croatia) Osijek	Vault	(United Kingdom) Ellie Downie	(Slovenia) Tjaša Kysselef	(Canada) Rose-Kaying Woo
(Croatia) Osijek	Uneven Bars	(United Kingdom) Ellie Downie	(Russia) Seda Tutkhalyan	(Russia) Natalia Kapitonova
(Croatia) Osijek	Balance Beam	(United Kingdom) Ellie Downie	(Russia) Maria Kharenkova	(Russia) Seda Tutkhalyan
(Croatia) Osijek	Floor Exercise	(United Kingdom) Ellie Downie	(Russia) Natalia Kapitonova	(Ukraine) Yana Horokhova
(Bulgaria) Varna	Vault	(Switzerland) Giulia Steingruber	(Vietnam) Phan Thị Hà Thanh	(Poland) Katarzyna Jurkowska
(Bulgaria) Varna	Uneven Bars	(Russia) Daria Skrypnik	(Russia) Evgenia Shelgunova	(Switzerland) Giulia Steingruber
(Bulgaria) Varna	Balance Beam	(France) Marine Boyer	(Vietnam) Phan Thị Hà Thanh	(Switzerland) Ilaria Käslin
(Bulgaria) Varna	Floor Exercise	(Switzerland) Giulia Steingruber	(Switzerland) Ilaria Käslin	(Russia) Evgenia Shelgunova
(Brazil) São Paulo	Vault	(Brazil) Daniele Hypólito	(Germany) Michelle Timm	(Finland) Annika Urvikko
(Brazil) São Paulo	Uneven Bars	(Venezuela) Jessica López	(Brazil) Rebeca Andrade (Germany) Kim Bùi	—N/a
(Brazil) São Paulo	Balance Beam	(Brazil) Daniele Hypólito	(Chile) Simona Castro	(Brazil) Rebeca Andrade
(Brazil) São Paulo	Floor Exercise	(Brazil) Daniele Hypólito	(Germany) Kim Bùi	(Brazil) Carolyne Pedro (Chile) Simona Castro
(Portugal) Anadia	Vault	(Cuba) Marcia Videaux	(Mexico) Alexa Moreno	(China) Wu Jing
(Portugal) Anadia	Uneven Bars	(Australia) Rianna Mizzen	(China) Xie Yufen	(China) Lyu Jiaqi
(Portugal) Anadia	Balance Beam	(Brazil) Flávia Saraiva	(Brazil) Rebeca Andrade	(China) Lyu Jiaqi
(Portugal) Anadia	Floor Exercise	(Brazil) Flávia Saraiva	(Brazil) Rebeca Andrade	(Italy) Vanessa Ferrari
(Turkey) Mersin	Vault	(Uzbekistan) Oksana Chusovitina	(Austria) Lisa Ecker	(Colombia) Catalina Escobar
(Turkey) Mersin	Uneven Bars	(Colombia) Catalina Escobar	(Turkey) Demet Mutlu	(Austria) Lisa Ecker
(Turkey) Mersin	Balance Beam	(Turkey) Tutya Yılmaz	(Uzbekistan) Oksana Chusovitina	(Austria) Lisa Ecker
(Turkey) Mersin	Floor Exercise	(Turkey) Göksu Üçtaş	(Austria) Lisa Ecker	(Colombia) Catalina Escobar
(Hungary) Szombathely	Vault	(China) Liu Jinru	(Australia) Emily Little	(Hungary) Boglárka Dévai
(Hungary) Szombathely	Uneven Bars	(China) Xie Yufen	(China) Lyu Jiaqi	(Hungary) Zsófia Kovács
(Hungary) Szombathely	Balance Beam	(Australia) Emily Little (China) Lyu Jiaqi	—N/a	(Czech Republic) Veronica Cenkova
(Hungary) Szombathely	Floor Exercise	(Hungary) Dorina Böczögő	(Czech Republic) Veronica Cenkova	(Croatia) Dora Kranzelic

== See also ==
- 2016 FIG Rhythmic Gymnastics World Cup series
