= Herodotos Giorgallas =

Cypriot gymnast (born 1977)

- Ηρόδοτος Γιωργαλλάς
- Born: 14 December 1977 (age 48)

Gymnastics career
- Discipline: Men's artistic gymnastics
- Country represented: Cyprus
Medal record
Men's gymnastics
Representing Cyprus
Summer Universiade
| Bronze medal – third place | 2001 Beijing | Rings |
Commonwealth Games
| Gold medal – first place | 2002 Manchester | Rings |
| Bronze medal – third place | 2006 Melbourne | Rings |
| Bronze medal – third place | 2010 Delhi | Rings |
Mediterranean Games
| Silver medal – second place | 2005 Almería | Rings |
Games of the Small States of Europe
| Gold medal – first place | 2013 Luxembourg | Rings |
| Gold medal – first place | 2015 Reykjavík | Rings |
| Gold medal – first place | 2015 Reykjavík | Team |
| Silver medal – second place | 2013 Luxembourg | Team |

Herodotos Giorgallas (Greek: Ηρόδοτος Γιωργαλλάς, born 14 December 1977) is a gymnast from Cyprus who took gold at the 2002 Commonwealth Games in Manchester. Herodotos shared the gold with Steve Frew of Scotland. He won the bronze medal in the Gymnastics for Men's Rings at the 2006 Commonwealth Games in Melbourne.
