= Yuto Kato =

Japanese artistic gymnast

- Full name: 加藤 裕斗
- Nickname: Yuto
- Born: 4 April 1997 (age 29)
- Height: 1.69 m (5 ft 7 in)

Gymnastics career
- Discipline: Men's artistic gymnastics
- Country represented: Japan
- College team: Juntendo University
- Club: Konami Sports
- Head coaches: Hiroyuki Kato; Takahiro Moriizumi; Kenya Kobayashi; Masataka Aoyamai
Medal record
Representing Japan
FIG World Cup
Bronze medal – third place	2016 Szombathely	Floor Exercise

Yuto Kato (加藤 裕斗, Kato Yuto; born 4 April 1997) is a Japanese artistic gymnast. Born in Sōka, Saitama, he graduated from Juntendo University and later join Konami Sports. Kato has represented Japan at several FIG World Cup competitions.

== See also ==
- Japan men's national gymnastics team
