= Gymnastics at the 2013 Games of the Small States of Europe =

Gymnastics at the 2013 Games of the Small States of Europe was held from 28–30 May 2013 in Stade Josy Barthel, Luxembourg.

== Medal summary ==
=== Medal table ===
* Host nation (Luxembourg)

Rank	Nation	Gold	Silver	Bronze	Total
1	Luxembourg*	4	6	2	12
2	Iceland	4	0	7	11
3	Monaco	3	2	1	6
4	Cyprus	1	3	3	7
5	Malta	0	1	0	1
Totals (5 entries)		12	12	13	37

=== Men ===
Event	Gold		Silver		Bronze	
Team All-around	Monaco; Julien Gobaux; Kévin Crovetto; Frédéric Unternaehr; Benjamin Niel; Lilian Piotte	233.495	Cyprus; Xenios Papaevripidou; Panagiotis Aristotelous; Michalis Krasias; Georgios Spanos; Herodotos Giorgallas	230.761	Iceland; Ólafur Gardar Gunnarsson; Robert Kristmannsson; Valgard Reinhardsson; Jón Sigurdur Gunnarsson; Pálmi Rafn Steindorsson	227.661
Parallel bars	Julien Gobaux (MON)	13.800	Sascha Palgen (LUX)	13.750	Vladimir Klimenko (LUX)	13.650
Floor	Sascha Palgen (LUX)	14.500	Vladimir Klimenko (LUX)	14.100	Robert Kristmannsson (ISL)	13.400
High bar	Vladimir Klimenko (LUX)	14.150	Julien Gobaux (MON)	13.850	Panagiotis Aristotelous (CYP)	13.500
Pommel horse	Vladimir Klimenko (LUX)	13.450	Julien Gobaux (MON)	13.150	Ólafur Gardar Gunnarsson (ISL)	12.550
Rings	Herodotos Georgallas (CYP)	14.750	Sascha Palgen (LUX)	14.400	Georgios Spanos (CYP)	14.100
Vault	Julien Gobaux (MON)	14.050	Vladimir Klimenko (LUX)	13.525	Kévin Crovetto (MON)	13.475

=== Women ===
Event	Gold		Silver		Bronze	
Team All-around	Iceland; Dominiqua Belanyi; Thelma Rut Hermannsdóttir; Norma Dogg Robertsdottir; Hildur Ólafsdóttir; Johanna Rakel Jónasdóttir	143.500	Luxembourg; Aline Bernar; Cindy Staar; Lisa Pastoret; Maite Baum; Christelle Timis	138.550	Cyprus; Lefki Louka; Rafaella Zannettou; Anastasia Theocharous; Coral Lee Dimitriadou; Eleni Eliades	135.950
Vault	Norma Dogg Robertsdottir (ISL)	13.625	Rafaella Zannettou (CYP)	13.225	Hildur Ólafsdóttir (ISL)	13.125
Uneven bars	Dominiqua Belanyi (ISL)	12.300	Christelle Timis (LUX)	10.650	Thelma Rut Hermannsdóttir (ISL)	10.100
Beam	Ali Bernar (LUX)	12.600	Suzanne Buttigieg (MLT)	12.100	Norma Dogg Robertsdottir (ISL); Dominiqua Belanyi (ISL)	12.000
Floor	Dominiqua Belanyi (ISL)	12.250	Lefki Louka (CYP)	12.150	Aline Bernar (LUX)	12.050
