= 2013 European Artistic Gymnastics Championships =

5th Individual European Artistic Gymnastics Championships
- Venue: Olympic Stadium
- Location: Moscow, Russia
- Dates: 17 to 21 April 2013
- Nations: Members of the European Union of Gymnastics

The 5th Individual European Artistic Gymnastics Championships for both men and women was held at the Olympic Stadium in Moscow, Russia, from 17 to 21 April 2013.

== Medal winners ==
Event	Gold	Silver	Bronze
Men
All-Around	David Belyavskiy (RUS)	Max Whitlock (GBR)	Oleg Verniaiev (UKR)
Floor	Max Whitlock (GBR) Alexander Shatilov (ISR)	None awarded	Andrea Cingolani (ITA)
Pommel Horse	Daniel Keatings (GBR)	Krisztián Berki (HUN)	Max Whitlock (GBR)
Still Rings	Samir Aït Saïd (FRA) Igor Radivilov (UKR)	None awarded	Danny Pinheiro Rodrigues (FRA) Matteo Morandi (ITA)
Vault	Denis Ablyazin (RUS)	Flavius Koczi (ROU)	Artur Davtyan (ARM)
Parallel Bars	Oleg Stepko (UKR)	Lucas Fischer (SUI)	David Belyavskiy (RUS)
Horizontal Bar	Emin Garibov (RUS)	Sam Oldham (GBR)	Aleksandr Tsarevich (BLR)
Women
All-Around	Aliya Mustafina (RUS)	Larisa Iordache (ROU)	Anastasia Grishina (RUS)
Vault	Giulia Steingruber (SUI)	Noël van Klaveren (NED) Larisa Iordache (ROU)	None awarded
Uneven Bars	Aliya Mustafina (RUS)	Jonna Adlerteg (SWE)	Maria Paseka (RUS)
Balance Beam	Larisa Iordache (ROU)	Diana Bulimar (ROU)	Anastasia Grishina (RUS)
Floor Exercise	Ksenia Afanasyeva (RUS)	Larisa Iordache (ROU)	Diana Bulimar (ROU)

== Men's results ==
=== Individual all-around ===
Rank	Gymnast	Floor (gymnastics)	Pommel horse	Rings (gymnastics)	Vault (gymnastics)	Parallel bars	Horizontal bar	Total
1st place, gold medalist(s)	David Belyavskiy (RUS)	15.266	14.900	14.633	15.400	15.000	14.600	89.799
2nd place, silver medalist(s)	Max Whitlock (GBR)	15.500	15.366	14.208	14.433	14.966	14.633	89.106
3rd place, bronze medalist(s)	Oleg Verniaiev (UKR)	14.333	14.066	14.733	15.500	15.666	14.100	88.393
4	Oleg Stepko (UKR)	14.733	14.900	14.666	13.966	15.433	14.400	88.098
5	Daniel Purvis (GBR)	14.400	14.200	14.533	14.800	14.466	14.333	86.732
6	Fabián González (ESP)	14.800	14.200	13.833	14.966	14.300	14.400	86.499
7	Andreas Toba (GER)	13.966	13.733	14.400	15.033	13.533	14.766	85.431
8	Artur Davtyan (ARM)	14.066	13.700	14.466	15.000	14.000	13.800	85.032
9	Claudo Capelli (SUI)	14.100	13.833	13.566	14.866	14.433	14.133	84.931
10	Nikita Ignatyev (RUS)	14.900	13.600	14.633	13.666	15.083	12.866	84.748
11	Guillaume Augugliaro (FRA)	13.333	13.600	14.633	14.266	14.383	14.433	84.348
12	Arnaud Willig (FRA)	14.466	13.000	14.333	14.300	14.391	13.666	84.156
13	Ludovico Edalli (ITA)	13.933	14.000	13.833	14.100	14.000	14.000	83.866
14	Daan Kenis (BEL)	14.033	13.533	13.100	14.533	13.966	14.100	83.265
15	Cristian Bățagă (ROU)	14.333	12.966	14.200	14.433	12.500	13.600	82.032
16	Rubén López (ESP)	14.300	11.733	14.233	13.666	13.900	13.866	81.698
17	Paolo Principi (ITA)	14.700	13.525	13.000	15.525	14.150	13.825	84.725
18	Dmitry Barkalov (BLR)	13.308	11.266	13.733	14.400	14.208	14.466	81.381
19	Serob Soghomonyan (ARM)	13.766	13.066	12.366	13.566	13.866	13.966	80.596
20	Bence Talas (HUN)	13.333	13.600	13.966	13.933	11.766	13.933	80.531
21	Jimmy Verbaeys (BEL)	14.066	13.033	13.466	13.900	11.800	14.066	80.331
22	Attila Racz (HUN)	13.400	11.633	14.200	13.000	13.966	13.900	80.099
23	Ferhat Arican (TUR)	12.666	13.933	13.300	14.366	12.533	13.200	79.998
24	Michel Bletterman (NED)	13.533	13.933	13.583	13.900	11.133	13.300	79.382

=== Floor exercise ===
Position	Gymnast	D Score	E Score	Penalty	Total
1st place, gold medalist(s)	Max Whitlock (GBR)	6.6	8.833	0.1	15.333
1st place, gold medalist(s)	Alexander Shatilov (ISR)	6.4	8.933		15.333
3rd place, bronze medalist(s)	Andrea Cingolani (ITA)	6.2	8.700		14.900
4	Flavius Koczi (ROU)	7.0	7.666		14.666
5	Sam Oldham (GBR)	6.3	8.200	0.1	14.400
5	David Belyavskiy (RUS)	6.3	8.200	0.1	14.400
7	Matthias Fahrig (GER)	6.3	7.433		13.733
8	Jeffrey Wammes (NED)	6.5	7.466	0.3	13.666

=== Pommel horse ===
Position	Gymnast	D Score	E Score	Penalty	Total
1st place, gold medalist(s)	Daniel Keatings (GBR)	6.7	8.900		15.600
2nd place, silver medalist(s)	Krisztián Berki (HUN)	6.7	8.833		15.533
3rd place, bronze medalist(s)	Max Whitlock (GBR)	6.7	8.800		15.500
4	Alberto Busnari (ITA)	6.7	8.733		15.433
5	Harutyun Merdinyan (ARM)	6.4	8.966		15.366
6	Donna-Donny Truyens (BEL)	6.6	8.533		15.133
7	Sašo Bertoncelj (SLO)	6.5	8.500		15.000
8	Filip Ude (CRO)	6.2	8.066		14.266

=== Still rings ===
Position	Gymnast	D Score	E Score	Penalty	Total
1st place, gold medalist(s)	Samir Aït Saïd (FRA)	6.8	8.666		15.466
1st place, gold medalist(s)	Igor Radivilov (UKR)	6.7	8.766		15.466
3rd place, bronze medalist(s)	Danny Pinheiro-Rodrigues (FRA)	6.7	8.733		15.433
3rd place, bronze medalist(s)	Matteo Morandi (ITA)	6.7	8.733		15.433
5	Eleftherios Petrounias (GRE)	7.0	8.400		15.400
5	Denis Ablyazin (RUS)	6.7	8.700		15.400
7	Yuri van Gelder (NED)	6.8	8.566		15.366
8	Marcel Nguyen (GER)	6.3	8.833		15.133

=== Vault ===
Rank	Gymnast	D Score	E Score	Pen.	Score 1	D Score	E Score	Pen.	Score 2	Total
1st place, gold medalist(s)	Denis Ablyazin (RUS)	6.0	9.433		15.433	6.2	9.183		15.383	15.408
2nd place, silver medalist(s)	Flavius Koczi (ROU)	6.0	9.158		15.158	5.6	9.016		14.616	14.887
3rd place, bronze medalist(s)	Artur Davtyan (ARM)	6.0	9.366	0.1	15.266	5.2	9.266		14.466	14.866
4	Petrus Laulumaa (FIN)	5.6	9.466		15.066	5.2	9.333		14.533	14.799
5	Igor Radivilov (UKR)	6.0	9.391		15.391	6.0	8.066	0.1	13.966	14.678
6	Oleg Verniaiev (UKR)	6.0	9.466		15.466	6.0	8.166	0.3	13.866	14.666
7	Jeffrey Wammes (NED)	5.6	9.200		14.800	5.8	8.066		13.866	14.333
8	Matthias Fahrig (GER)	6.0	8.166		14.166	5.6	8.233	0.3	13.533	13.849
Rank	Gymnast	Vault 1				Vault 2				Total

=== Parallel bars ===
Position	Gymnast	D Score	E Score	Penalty	Total
1st place, gold medalist(s)	Oleg Stepko (UKR)	6.6	9.166		15.766
2nd place, silver medalist(s)	Lucas Fischer (SUI)	6.5	9.133		15.633
3rd place, bronze medalist(s)	David Belyavskiy (RUS)	6.4	9.133		15.533
4	Marcel Nguyen (GER)	6.8	8.700		15.500
5	Oleg Verniaiev (UKR)	6.5	8.833		15.333
6	Emin Garibov (RUS)	6.2	8.000		14.200
7	Andrei Vasile Muntean (ROU)	6.0	7.866		13.866
8	Pascal Bucher (SUI)	5.7	7.866		13.566

=== Horizontal bar ===
Position	Gymnast	D Score	E Score	Penalty	Total
1st place, gold medalist(s)	Emin Garibov (RUS)	7.0	8.433		15.433
2nd place, silver medalist(s)	Sam Oldham (GBR)	6.5	8.633		15.133
3rd place, bronze medalist(s)	Aleksandr Tsarevich (BLR)	6.5	8.333		14.833
4	Alexander Shatilov (ISR)	6.5	8.233		14.733
5	Andrei Likhovitskiy (BLR)	6.0	8.466		14.466
6	Fabian Hambuechen (GER)	6.4	7.566		13.966
7	Marijo Možnik (CRO)	6.4	7.533		13.933
8	Ashley Watson (GBR)	5.8	7.033		12.833

== Women's results ==
=== Qualification ===
Team	Vault (gymnastics)		Uneven bars		Balance beam		Floor (gymnastics)		Total (All-around)	
Team	Score	Rank	Score	Rank	Score	Rank	Score	Rank	Score	Rank
Lisa Ecker (AUT)	13.733	24	12.400	33	12.300	26	12.433	28	50.866	21
Elisa Hämmerle (AUT)	14.000	15	12.666	28	11.866	35	11.833	44	50.365	26
Jasmin Mader (AUT)	13.700	27	12.233	37	11.666	39	12.533	27	50.132	29
Katsiaryna Fiadutsik (BLR)	12.900	47	11.900	40	11.400	45	12.600	24	48.800	33
Anastasia Miklashevich (BLR)			13.500	15	12.233	27			25.733	63
Ralitsa Mileva (BUL)	13.400	36	11.100	50	11.000	49	10.633	56	46.133	41
Tijana Tkalčec (CRO)	13.933	16							13.933	69
Jana Šikulová (CZE)	13.633	29	13.833	11	11.600	43	12.066	32	51.132	19
Kristýna Pálešová (CZE)	13.058	45	13.366	18	10.700	55	11.433	48	48.557	36
Mette Hulgaard (DEN)	12.733	49	11.033	51	10.433	57	11.833	42	46.032	42
Mia Furu (DEN)	13.100	41	9.700	56	9.933	61	11.566	46	44.299	46
Janneke Lanng (DEN)	12.100	57	10.000	55	9.933	60	10.533	57	42.566	48
Michelle Lauritsen (DEN)			12.333	34					12.333	73
Roxana Popa (ESP)	14.566	9	13.633	13	13.166	14	13.700	8	55.065	6
Maria Paula Vargas (ESP)	14.000	14	12.933	25	12.966	18	13.133	14	53.032	12
Ida Laisi (FIN)	13.666	28	12.333	35	11.766	38	12.433	29	50.198	27
Maija Leinonen (FIN)	13.066	43	13.066	22	12.000	33	12.066	33	50.198	28
Rosanna Ojala (FIN)	13.366	37	11.633	44	12.066	32	11.933	39	48.998	32
Annika Urvikko (FIN)	13.800	21	11.200	49	11.200	46	11.900	41	48.100	37
Ruby Harrold (GBR)	13.833	19	14.133	5	13.433	10	13.400	11	54.799	7
Charlie Fellows (GBR)	13.900	17	13.100	21	13.200	12	12.366	30	52.566	15
Gabrielle Jupp (GBR)			13.933	9	13.566	8			27.499	59
Becky Downie (GBR)			14.733	2					14.733	66
Lisa Katharina Hill (GER)	12.966	46	13.933	10	12.100	31	12.966	17	51.965	17
Çağla Akyol (GER)	13.600	32	11.233	48	12.900	20	12.766	19	50.499	23
Sophie Scheder (GER)			14.700	3					14.700	67
Myropi Christofilaki (GRE)	12.100	56	10.566	53	9.400	62	11.333	51	43.399	47
Maria Simou (GRE)	11.833	60	6.900	61	7.900	64	10.800	55	37.433	53
Vasiliki Millousi (GRE)					12.666	22			12.666	71
Dorina Böczögő (HUN)	13.800	20	13.166	20	12.633	23	13.133	13	52.732	13
Noémi Makra (HUN)	14.133	12	13.500	16	11.833	36	13.233	12	52.699	14
Luca Divéky (HUN)	13.633	30	11.433	45	12.700	21	11.500	47	49.266	30
India McPeak (IRL)	13.166	40	10.000	54	11.100	48	11.266	53	45.532	43
Emma Lunn (IRL)	11.900	59	4.000	63	8.066	63	11.966	37	35.932	55
Dominiqua Belányi (ISL)	12.766	48	11.966	39	12.200	28	11.633	45	48.565	35
Norma Róbertsdóttir (ISL)	13.600	32	9.133	59	10.700	54	11.900	40	45.333	44
Thelma Hermannsdóttir (ISL)	12.133	55	9.666	57	12.200	29	11.300	52	45.299	45
Tinna Óðinsdóttir (ISL)	12.500	52	9.500	58	6.600	65	10.933	54	39.533	51
Ofir Netzer (ISR)	14.266	11					10.400	58	24.666	64
Elisa Meneghini (ITA)	14.016	13	13.800	12	14.033	4	12.933	18	54.782	8
Giorgia Campana (ITA)	13.500	35	14.066	7	14.033	4	12.700	21	54.299	10
Carlotta Ferlito (ITA)					14.200	3	13.800	7	28.000	58
Vanessa Ferrari (ITA)					13.833	6	13.600	10	27.433	60
Valērija Grišāne (LAT)	13.600	31			11.933	34	12.566	25	38.099	52
Ana Koniuchovaitė (LTU)	13.100	41	8.900	60	9.966	59	10.133	60	42.099	49
Laura Švilpaitė (LTU)	0.000	61	11.866	41	10.758	53	0.000	61	22.624	65
Noël van Klaveren (NED)	14.866	5	13.000	23	11.566	44	12.633	23	52.065	16
Chantysha Netteb (NED)	13.800	20	12.666	27	10.633	56			37.099	54
Haldis Nærum (NOR)	12.466	53	11.333	46	11.766	37	11.833	42	47.398	40
Katarzyna Jurkowska (POL)					13.500	9			13.500	70
Ana Filipa Martins (POR)	13.333	38	13.466	17	13.200	13	13.100	15	53.099	11
Ekaterina Kislinskaya (POR)	12.700	50	11.266	47	12.366	25	12.300	31	48.632	34
Larisa Iordache (ROU)	14.766	8	12.966	24	15.066	1	14.400	2	57.198	1
Diana Bulimar (ROU)	14.833	6	12.700	26	14.366	2	14.233	5	56.132	2
Anastasia Grishina (RUS)	14.833	6	13.566	14	13.400	11	14.266	4	56.065	3
Aliya Mustafina (RUS)	15.066	2	15.025	1	11.666	40	14.300	3	56.057	4
Ksenia Afanasyeva (RUS)	14.900	4	12.466	30	13.100	15	14.633	1	55.099	5
Maria Paseka (RUS)	15.066	2	14.100	6					29.166	57
Teja Belak (SLO)	14.333	10			12.133	30			26.466	61
Saša Golob (SLO)							12.033	36	12.033	74
Giulia Steingruber (SUI)	15.300	1	12.466	31	13.033	16	13.933	6	54.732	9
Ilaria Käslin (SUI)	13.300	39	12.633	28	12.933	19	12.633	22	51.499	18
Laura Schulte (SUI)	13.800	21	12.250	36	11.633	41	12.700	20	50.383	25
Jessica Diacci (SUI)	12.000	58	11.700	43	13.000	17	12.566	26	49.266	31
Barbora Mokošová (SVK)	13.066	43	11.833	42	10.866	51	12.066	33	47.831	38
Ida Gustafsson (SWE)	13.866	18	14.066	8	10.800	52	11.966	38	50.698	22
Jonna Adlerteg (SWE)			14.333	4					14.333	68
Demet Mutlu (TUR)	13.600	32	10.900	52	11.200	47	12.041	35	47.741	39
Özlem Özkan (TUR)	12.666	51	5.933	62	10.200	58	11.400	49	40.199	50
Yağmur Alparslan (TUR)	12.400	54			10.966	50	11.333	50	34.699	56
Olena Vasylieva (UKR)	13.733	24	13.200	19	13.600	7	10.400	59	50.933	20
Angelina Kysla (UKR)	13.733	24	12.066	38	11.633	42	13.000	16	50.432	24
Krystyna Sankova (UKR)					12.566	24	13.666	9	26.232	62
Daria Matveieva (UKR)			12.433	32					12.433	72

=== Individual all-around ===
Rank	Gymnast	Vault (gymnastics)	Uneven bars	Balance beam	Floor (gymnastics)	Total
1st place, gold medalist(s)	Aliya Mustafina (RUS)	15.033	15.133	14.400	14.466	59.032
2nd place, silver medalist(s)	Larisa Iordache (ROU)	14.900	13.833	14.833	14.866	58.432
3rd place, bronze medalist(s)	Anastasia Grishina (RUS)	14.900	15.033	14.133	13.866	57.932
4	Diana Bulimar (ROU)	14.766	13.666	14.400	14.233	57.065
4	Giulia Steingruber (SUI)	15.066	13.800	14.366	13.833	57.065
6	Roxana Popa (ESP)	14.633	14.300	13.133	13.633	55.699
7	Elisa Meneghini (ITA)	13.866	13.633	14.000	13.700	55.199
8	Ruby Harrold (GBR)	13.900	14.033	13.300	13.400	54.633
9	Maria Paula Vargas (ESP)	13.833	13.900	13.400	13.200	54.333
10	Ida Gustafsson (SWE)	13.833	13.966	13.233	13.100	54.132
11	Noémi Makra (HUN)	13.833	13.466	13.700	12.966	53.965
11	Giorgia Campana (ITA)	13.900	13.933	13.166	12.966	53.965
13	Ilaria Käslin (SUI)	13.733	13.166	13.933	12.800	53.632
14	Lisa Katharina Hill (GER)	13.766	14.366	11.966	13.300	53.398
15	Ana Filipa Martins (POR)	13.233	13.300	12.800	13.000	52.333
16	Noël van Klaveren (NED)	14.366	11.733	12.366	13.333	51.798
17	Olena Vasylieva (UKR)	13.300	12.766	13.266	12.000	51.332
18	Charlie Fellows (GBR)	13.633	13.200	12.100	12.266	51.199
19	Lisa Ecker (AUT)	13.766	12.500	12.400	12.525	51.191
20	Jana Šikulová (CZE)	13.533	13.633	11.266	12.500	50.932
21	Çağla Akyol (GER)	13.600	11.733	12.500	12.533	50.366
22	Dorina Böczögő (HUN)	13.600	11.600	11.700	13.300	50.200
23	Elisa Hämmerle (AUT)	13.933	12.366	11.033	12.600	49.932
24	Angelina Kysla (UKR)	0.000	13.400	11.466	13.133	37.999

=== Vault ===
Rank	Gymnast	D Score	E Score	Pen.	Score 1	D Score	E Score	Pen.	Score 2	Total
1st place, gold medalist(s)	Giulia Steingruber (SUI)	6.2	9.100		15.300	5.2	9.000		14.200	14.750
2nd place, silver medalist(s)	Noël van Klaveren (NED)	5.8	9.100		14.900	5.2	8.833		14.033	14.466
2nd place, silver medalist(s)	Larisa Iordache (ROU)	5.8	9.100		14.900	5.2	8.833		14.033	14.466
4	Ofir Netzer (ISR)	5.3	8.900		14.200	5.2	8.933		14.133	14.166
4	Teja Belak (SLO)	5.3	8.900		14.200	5.3	8.833		14.133	14.166
6	Chantysha Netteb (NED)	5.3	7.766	0.1	12.966	5.2	8.800		14.100	13.533
7	Maria Paseka (RUS)	6.3	7.766	0.1	13.966	5.6	7.533	0.1	13.033	13.499
8	Tijana Tkalčec (CRO)	5.3	7.566		12.866	5.3	8.200		13.500	13.183
Rank	Gymnast	Vault 1				Vault 2				Total

=== Uneven bars ===
Position	Gymnast	D Score	E Score	Penalty	Total
1st place, gold medalist(s)	Aliya Mustafina (RUS)	6.3	9.000		15.300
2nd place, silver medalist(s)	Jonna Adlerteg (SWE)	6.0	8.633		14.633
3rd place, bronze medalist(s)	Maria Paseka (RUS)	5.8	8.600		14.400
4	Sophie Scheder (GER)	6.0	8.366		14.366
5	Giorgia Campana (ITA)	5.6	8.466		14.066
6	Ida Gustafsson (SWE)	5.8	7.366		13.166
7	Rebecca Downie (GBR)	5.9	7.100		13.000
8	Ruby Harrold (GBR)	5.8	7.100		12.900

=== Balance beam ===
Position	Gymnast	D Score	E Score	Penalty	Total
1st place, gold medalist(s)	Larisa Iordache (ROU)	6.4	8.866		15.266
2nd place, silver medalist(s)	Diana Bulimar (ROU)	6.0	8.833		14.833
3rd place, bronze medalist(s)	Anastasia Grishina (RUS)	5.6	8.766		14.366
4	Carlotta Ferlito (ITA)	5.8	8.266		14.066
5	Katarzyna Jurkowska (POL)	5.5	8.366		13.866
6	Ruby Harrold (GBR)	5.1	8.533		13.633
7	Elisa Meneghini (ITA)	5.7	7.433		13.133
8	Olena Vasylieva (UKR)	4.1	5.833		9.933

=== Floor exercise ===
Position	Gymnast	D Score	E Score	Penalty	Total
1st place, gold medalist(s)	Ksenia Afanasyeva (RUS)	6.3	8.866		15.166
2nd place, silver medalist(s)	Larisa Iordache (ROU)	6.1	8.633		14.733
3rd place, bronze medalist(s)	Diana Bulimar (ROU)	5.8	8.733		14.533
4	Anastasia Grishina (RUS)	5.8	8.433		14.233
5	Carlotta Ferlito (ITA)	5.6	8.616		14.216
6	Giulia Steingruber (SUI)	6.0	8.300	0.2	14.100
7	Roxana Popa (ESP)	5.7	8.200		13.900
8	Krystyna Sankova (UKR)	5.7	7.166		12.866

== Medal count ==
=== Combined ===
Rank	Nation	Gold	Silver	Bronze	Total
1	Russia	6	0	4	10
2	Great Britain	2	2	1	5
3	Ukraine	2	0	1	3
4	Romania	1	5	1	7
5	Switzerland	1	1	0	2
6	France	1	0	1	2
7	Israel	1	0	0	1
8	Hungary	0	1	0	1
8	Netherlands	0	1	0	1
8	Sweden	0	1	0	1
11	Italy	0	0	2	2
12	Armenia	0	0	1	1
12	Belarus	0	0	1	1
Totals (13 entries)		14	11	12	37

=== Men ===
Rank	Nation	Gold	Silver	Bronze	Total
1	Russia	3	0	1	4
2	Great Britain	2	2	1	5
3	Ukraine	2	0	1	3
4	France	1	0	1	2
5	Israel	1	0	0	1
6	Hungary	0	1	0	1
6	Romania	0	1	0	1
6	Switzerland	0	1	0	1
9	Italy	0	0	2	2
10	Armenia	0	0	1	1
10	Belarus	0	0	1	1
Totals (11 entries)		9	5	8	22

=== Women ===
Rank	Nation	Gold	Silver	Bronze	Total
1	Russia	3	0	3	6
2	Romania	1	4	1	6
3	Switzerland	1	0	0	1
4	Netherlands	0	1	0	1
4	Sweden	0	1	0	1
Totals (5 entries)		5	6	4	15
