= Étoile de Monaco =

Gymnastics and trampoline club

L'Étoile de Monaco is Monaco's men's gymnastics and trampoline club founded in 1890. It is the oldest sports club founded in Monaco. The club is affiliated with both the French Gymnastics Federation and the Monegasque Gymnastics Federation. It therefore participates both in the French Gymnastics Championship and can also represent the Principality of Monaco in international competitions under the International Olympic Committee.

== History ==
L'Étoile de Monaco was founded in 1890 by Eugène Marquet and Charles Vatrican.

In 1997 l’Étoile de Monaco's gymnast Grégory Salerno was the first to take part in international performance during the Games of the Small States of Europe.

In 2010 the club's gymnast Kevin Crovetto was the first Monegasque artistic gymnast who participated at the European Championships in Birmingham. In 2011, Crovetto was also the first Monegasque gymnast to participate in the World Gymnastics Championships in Tokyo and in the 2016 Rio Olympic Games.

Since September 2012, the club has been sponsored by Hamilton Sabot, a medalist at the London 2012 Olympic Games.

In the end of the 2017/2018 season, l’Étoile de Monaco acceded for the very first time in its history to the Elite division of French Gymnastics, the Top 12 by finishing vice-champion of France.

The President of the club is Dominique Bertolotto.

== Notable members ==
- Thierry Aymes, general coach
- Sébastien Guizol, gymnastics coach
- David Martin, trampoline coach
- Kévin Crovetto, gymnast
