= Ólafur Gunnarsson =

Icelandic author and translator

Ólafur Gunnarsson (born in Reykjavík, Iceland, on 18 July 1948) is a contemporary Icelandic author and translator.

== Life and work ==
After graduating from the Commercial College of Iceland in 1968, Gunnarsson worked from 1965 to 1971 for Ásbjörn Ólafsson ehf, and was a driver with the Reykjavík medical emergency services from 1972 to 1978. Since 1974 he has worked as an independent writer and translator.

Ólafur began his literary career as a poet, with poems appearing in newspapers, magazines and pamphlets before his first novel, Milljón prósent menn (Million Percent Men), which appeared in 1978. He has published novels, short stories and children's books as well as a travel story about his road trip with co-author and fellow novelist Einar Kárason in America in 2006. His novel Tröllakirkja (Trolls' Cathedral) was nominated for the Icelandic Literary Prize in 1992 and the English translation was nominated for the IMPAC Dublin Literature Award in 1996. A stage adaptation of the book was premiered at the National Theatre of Iceland in 1996, and the film rights were sold. Gunnarsson received the Icelandic Literary Prize for his novel, Öxin og jörðin (The Ax and the Earth), in 2003

Ólafur's work has been translated into other languages. The children's book Fallegi flughvalurinn (The Beautiful Flying Whale, 1989) has been published in English and was nominated for the Nordic Children's Book Prize in 1990. Some of his novels have been translated into English, German and French. Gunnarsson has also translated novels and plays into Icelandic.

Since 2000 Ólafur Gunnarsson has published two large-scale novels, Málarinn (The Painter, 2012) and Syndarinn (The Sinner, 2015). The Painter is a book about crimes, forgery and their consequences.

== Critical assessment ==
Ólafur is viewed as a realist, and he belongs to the realist school of modern Icelandic authors. In the standard English-language history of Icelandic literature Daisy Neijmann writes that "the novels of Einar Kárason, Einar Már Guðmundsson and Ólafur Gunnarsson can all be termed urban epics." Mitzi M. Brunsdale, in the Encyclopedia of Nordic Crime Fiction, calls Gunnarsson "one of Iceland's most important realist storytellers." Valerie Hemingway calls Gunnarsson "a masterful storyteller", and says that his tales "depict family intrigue with a skill, depth, and haunting quality that grasps the reader's attention and holds it tight."

In the Times Literary Supplement, critic Paul Binding noted an echo of the Japanese writer, Shusaku Endo, "who can also combine a scrupulous naturalism with a sense of metaphysical forces at work." Binding viewed Gunnarsson's novel as "a formidable work, mesmerically readable." Gisa Funk, in Frankfurter Allgemeine Zeitung, wrote that "of all the contemporary Icelandic authors that German readers have had an opportunity to read in translation, Olafur Gunnarsson is the one who most obviously picked up the torch from his great colleague and predecessor Halldor Laxness. He also paints an impressive portrait of how contemporary social and economic changes have affected traditional Icelandic society."

== Works ==
=== Novels ===
- Milljón prósent menn (1978)
- Ljóstollur (1980)
- Gaga (1984, 2000)
- Heilagur andi og englar vítis (1986),
- Tröllakirkja (1992
- Blóðakur (1996)
- Vetrarferðin (1999)
- Öxin og jörðin (2003)
- Höfuðlausn (2005)
- Dimmar Rósir (2008)
- Málarinn (2012)
- Syndarinn (2015)

=== Children's books ===
- Fallegi flughvalurinn
- Fallegi flughvalurinn og sagan af litla stjörnukerfinu
- Snjæljónin

=== Poetry ===
- Hrognkelsin: Cyclopteri Lumpi
- Ljóð
- Upprisan eða undan ryklokinu

=== Books in English translation ===
- Gaga, translated by David McDuff, 1988,
- Trolls' Cathedral, translated by David McDuff and Jill Burrows, 1996,
- The Beautiful Flying Whale and the Tale of the Little Galaxy, 1999,
- Potter's Field, translated by Jill Burrows, 1999,
- Million Percent Men, translated by David McDuff, 2008
