= Lisa Ecker =

Austrian artistic gymnast (born 1992)

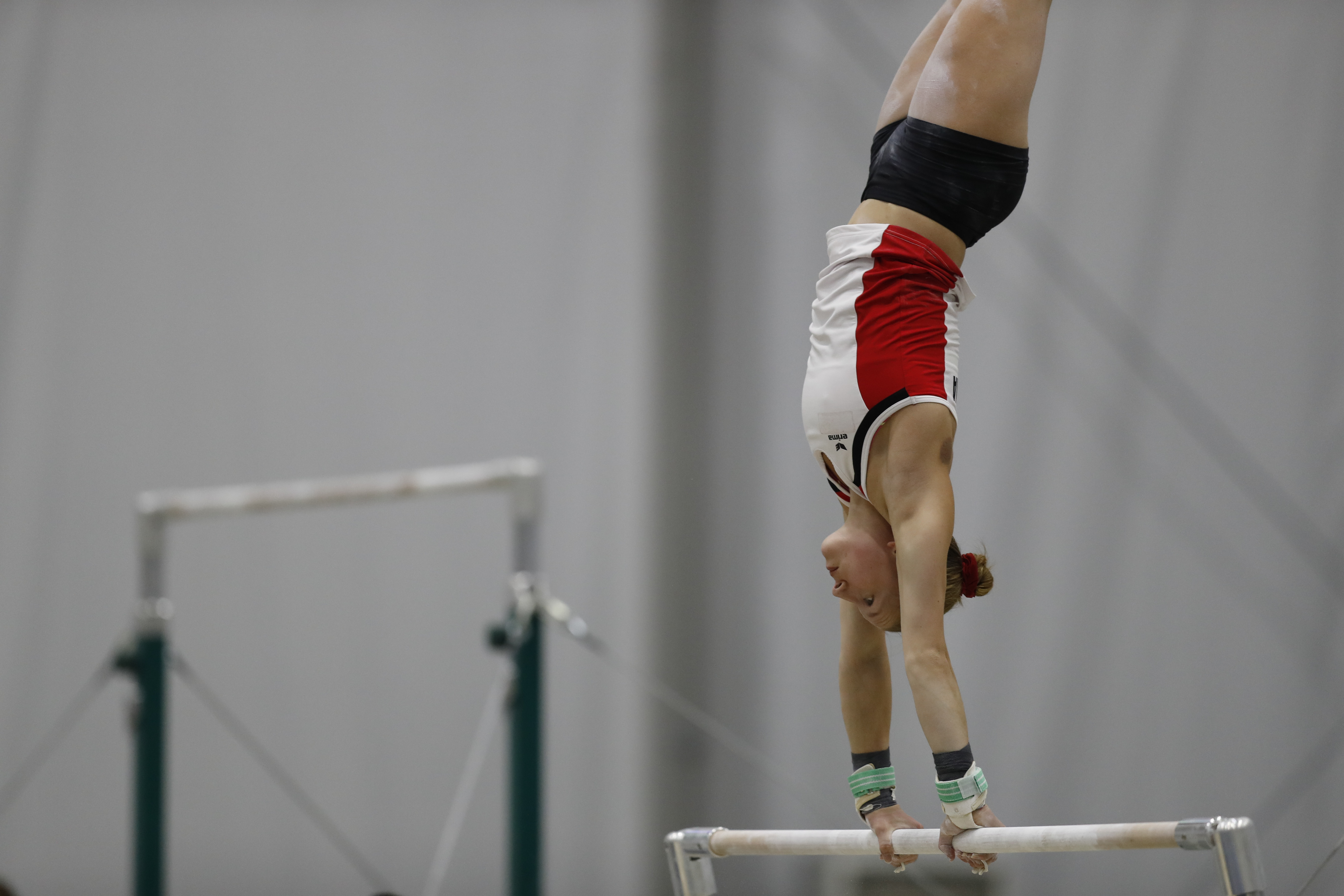
- Ecker in 2016

Personal information
- Full name: Lisa Ecker
- Born: 19 September 1992 (age 33) Linz, Austria
- Height: 1.57 m (5 ft 2 in)

Gymnastics career
- Discipline: Women's artistic gymnastics
- Country represented: Austria (2015)
- Club: ASKO Kleinmunchen
- Head coach: Johanna Gratt
Medal record
Women's artistic gymnastics
Representing Austria
Event	1st	2nd	3rd
2012 FIG World Challenge Cup	0	1	0
2013 FIG World Challenge Cup	0	0	1
2016 FIG World Challenge Cup	0	2	3
Total	0	3	4

Lisa Ecker (born 19 September 1992) is an Austrian female artistic gymnast who competed at the senior international elite level. She competed at the 2016 Summer Olympics in Rio, placing 43rd; it was only the second time that Austria was represented in artistic gymnastics at the Olympics, after a hiatus of 48 years. In 2017, she retired from competition, having won seven World Challenge Cup medals and 14 national titles, and having reached one European Championship final.

== Early life and training ==
Ecker first did gymnastics in kindergarten, and started training competitively in 2000 at the age of eight. She was coached by Johanna Gratt, who was also her physiotherapist, for 16 years. As of 2016, she was training at the TGW gymnastics performance center at the Linz winter port. Her home club was ASKÖ Kleinmünchen.

== Gymnastics career ==
Ecker's first Austrian all-around title came in 2012, when she won in the absence of Barbara Gasser. Her victory came after a year out with injury, due to a torn ACL, which she sustained shortly after the 2011 World Championships in Tokyo. She also took home her first international medal, winning silver at the 2012 FIG World Challenge Cup in Ostrava. That year, she was named Austria's Gymnast of the Year.

In 2013, Ecker reached the finals at the European Championship in Moscow, placing 19th in the individual all-around, the best result for an Austrian woman in 50 years. She subsequently won a bronze medal on the balance beam at the 2013 FIG World Challenge Cup in Ljubljana.

Ecker won her third national title in all-around artistic gymnastics in November 2014, despite having undergone knee surgery the year before. In 2015, Ecker participated at the 2015 World Championships in Glasgow.

In February 2016, Ecker won the bronze medal in vault at the FIG Artistic Gymnastics World Challenge Cup in Baku, Azerbaijan, with a score of 13.775 points. In April, she qualified for 2016 Summer Olympics in Rio de Janeiro, with an error-free performance on all four devices, ranking 12th with 53.132 all-around points. She qualified despite an injury to her fourth metatarsal which she had sustained in March. It was only the second time that Austria had qualified for the Olympics in artistic gymnastics after its absence for nearly half a century.

In July 2016, Ecker competed in the FIG Artistic Gymnastics World Challenge Cup in Mersin, Turkey, and won four medals, one on each device. At the 2016 Summer Olympics the following month, she finished 43rd in the preliminary phase of the women's artistic gymnastics with an all-around score of 52.966. She failed to qualify for the final or set a personal record, following a fall from the uneven bars.

Although Ecker had originally considered retiring immediately after the Olympics, she took a break instead. She retired in 2017, aged 24, due in part to an ankle injury and the unavailability of a suitable coach to replace Gratt.

== Personal life ==
Ecker is from Linz, Austria. Before retiring from competition, she studied as a masseuse and applied for a Fachhochschule course in physiotherapy. In 2020, she married her long-time partner Lukas Kranzlmüller, an international gymnast who had won the Austrian national men's title in 2014. Kranzlmüller is pursuing a career as a police officer, while Ecker works as a physiotherapist.
