= Anna Dementyeva =

Russian artistic gymnast

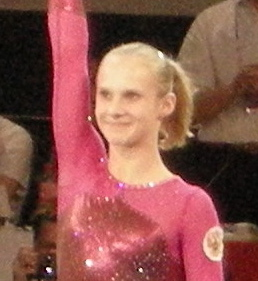
- Dementyeva at the 2011 European Artistic Gymnastics Championships

Personal information
- Full name: Anna Yurievna Dementyeva
- Born: 28 December 1994 (age 31) Samara, Russia
- Height: 144 cm (4 ft 9 in)

Gymnastics career
- Discipline: Women's artistic gymnastics
- Country represented: Russia (2007–2013)
- Club: CSKA Moscow
- Head coach: Elena Zigano
- Assistant coach: Mikhail Sarushkin
- Choreographer: Olga Burova
Medal record
Event	1st	2nd	3rd
World Championships	1	1	0
European Championships	2	0	0
Summer Universiade	1	0	0
Representing Russia
World Championships
Gold medal – first place	2010 Rotterdam	Team
Silver medal – second place	2011 Tokyo	Team
European Championships
Gold medal – first place	2011 Berlin	All-Around
Gold medal – first place	2011 Berlin	Balance Beam
Summer Universiade
Gold medal – first place	2013 Kazan	Team

Anna Yurievna Dementyeva (Russian: Анна Юрьевна Дементьева; born 28 December 1994) is a retired Russian artistic gymnast. She is the 2011 European all-around and beam champion, and a world gold medalist with the team.

== Personal life ==
Dementyeva was born on 28 December 1994 in Samara, Russia.

== Career ==
=== Junior ===
Dementyeva competed at the 2008 Junior European Championships in Clermont-Ferrand, France, winning the gold medal with the Russian team.

=== 2009–2010 ===
At the Japan Cup in July 2009, Dementyeva contributed to the team silver by competing on floor (scored 12.850). In August she competed at the Russian Cup where she won bronze in the all-around (overall score 55.133), and silver on beam (14.300) and on floor (14.625). She also placed fourth on uneven bars (13.900) and fifth on vault (13.475).

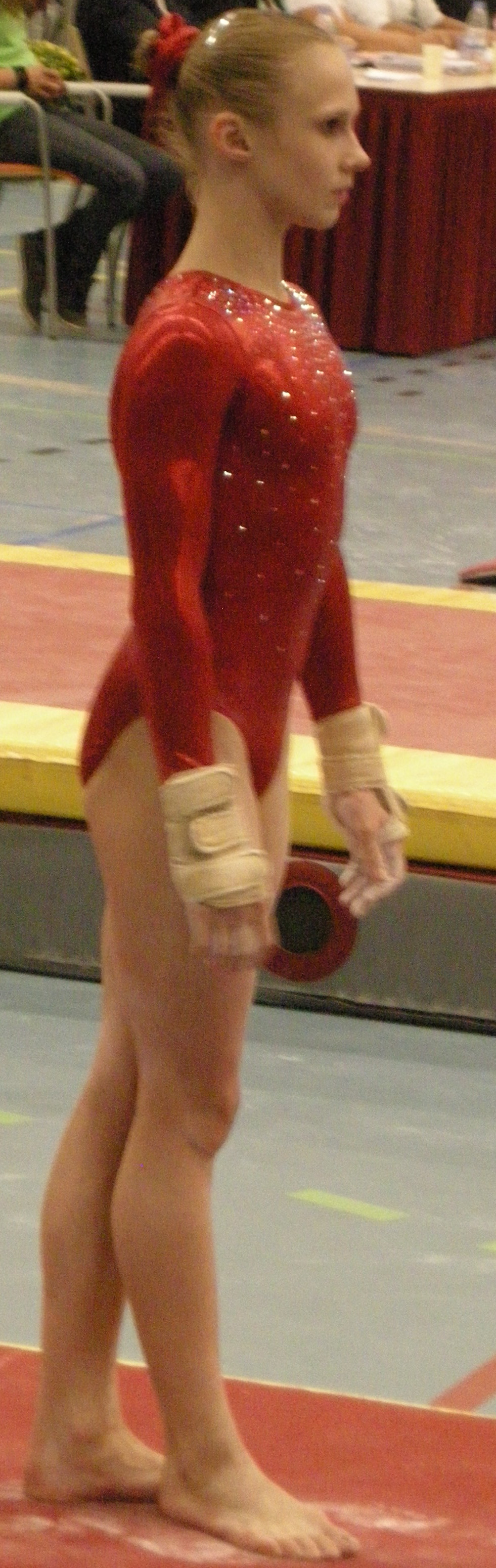
Demenyeva in Waalwijk 2010

In August of 2010, at the Russian Cup, she won gold on beam (15.375) and bronze on vault (13.463), and placed eighth all-around and fourth on floor. In October, Dementyeva was the youngest gymnast competing at the 2010 World Gymnastics Championships. Here, she made a significant contribution to Russia's team gold medal-winning performance by competing on uneven bars (13.366), beam (14.400), and on floor (14.533). She also made the beam final, placing sixth with a score of 13.966. Later that year she had a good showing at the DTB Cup in Stuttgart where she won silver on floor, and bronze on beam and uneven bars. Her final 2010 competition was the Toyota Cup, where she won silver on uneven bars and placed fifth on floor. She also placed seventh on beam after suffering two falls.

=== 2011 ===
In February, Dementyeva became Russian all-around national champion. She performed consistently well in all four disciplines, scoring 15.100 on floor exercise (the highest mark on that even among her teammates), 14.650 on uneven bars, 14.350 on balance beam, and 13.950 on vault, resulting in an overall score of 58.050. Next Dementyeva competed at the Bercy World Cup (French International) where she won bronze medal on balance beam and floor exercise.

In April, Dementyeva went to Berlin for the European Championships where she won gold in the all-around with a score of 57.475. The favourite going into the all-around event was Dementyeva's teammate Aliya Mustafina, but Mustafina injured her left knee on the vault during the first rotation and had to withdraw. In winning the competition, Dementyeva obtained the highest score on beam (15.150), the second highest on floor (14.475 - behind Diana Chelaru), and the third on uneven bars (14.250), and scored 13.600 on vault. These scores gave her an overall of 57.475 (0.775 ahead of second placed Elisabeth Seitz). In the event finals Dementyeva went on to win a second gold medal on beam (with a score of 15.350). She also placed fourth on the uneven bars and seventh in the floor exercise. At the Moscow World Cup event in May, Dementyeva was in dominant form, winning gold medals in the floor exercise and on the beam. She also won silver on the uneven bars. In July, coach Alexandrov confirmed that the focus was now firmly on upgrading Dementyeva's routines to make her more competitive at the 2011 World Championships and the 2012 Summer Olympics. Alexandrov stated: "Let’s wait and see. I did not know she could win Europeans. And she got on beam and got the highest score right off and was a point ahead of everyone on one event. She needs to improve her vault and if she does then she can be competitive. She has a good beam routine, even though you can always fall on beam, but for the all-around she has a very high difficulty score. And we are still trying to add difficulty to her programme".

Dementyeva next competed at the 2011 Russia Cup in Yekaterinburg between 17 and 21 August 2011. She won the all-around competition with a score of 59.800 (Vault 14.700, uneven bars 14.975, beam 15.300, floor 14.825), with Viktoria Komova (returning from injury) finishing second. As Blythe Lawrence pointed out in Universal Sports, Dementyeva brought out some upgrades to her routines during the competition: "In spite of Russian coach Aleksander Aleksandrov's assertion that Dementyeva is not an all-around threat outside of Europe, the baby of last year's World Team looked pretty darn good in her home country. Dementyeva showed off an upgraded double-twisting Yurchenko on vault and channeled a jazz age screen siren in her new floor routine when she wasn't landing some truly challenging tumbling, including a full in double tuck final pass." Dementyeva went on to win silver medals on the vault and on the beam during the event finals of the competition, and also finished fourth on the uneven bars and sixth in the floor event.

In her final event prior to the 2011 World Championships in Tokyo, Dementyeva competed in the 7th Dinamo International in Penza. However, her form during this competition was sub-par compared with her performances earlier in the year and she could only finish fourth in the all-around with a score of just 55.675. In the event finals, she finished fourth in the floor exercise and seventh on the beam.

=== 2012–2013 ===
In 2012 Dementyeva struggled with injuries and therefore did not make the Olympic team.

Dementyeva returned to competition in 2013 where she won two medals at the Cottbus World Cup. She also competed at the 2013 Summer Universiade where she contributed scores of 14.250 on uneven bars, 15.300 on balance beam, and 13.550 on floor exercise to the Russian team's first-place finish. She also qualified for balance beam finals in first place; however she finished fifth during the final. During the competition Dementyeva's back pain returned and she retired shortly afterwards.

== Competitive history ==
Year	Event	Team	AA	VT	UB	BB	FX
2008
2008	European Championships (Junior)	1st place, gold medalist(s)					
2009	Japan Cup	2nd place, silver medalist(s)					
2010	Japan Cup	1st place, gold medalist(s)					
2010	World Championships	1st place, gold medalist(s)				6	
2011	National Championships		1st place, gold medalist(s)	7	2nd place, silver medalist(s)	1st place, gold medalist(s)	2nd place, silver medalist(s)
2011	Paris World Cup					3rd place, bronze medalist(s)	3rd place, bronze medalist(s)
2011	European Championships		1st place, gold medalist(s)		4	1st place, gold medalist(s)	7
2011	Russian Cup		1st place, gold medalist(s)	2nd place, silver medalist(s)	4	2nd place, silver medalist(s)	6
2011	World Championships	2nd place, silver medalist(s)					
2012	Russian Cup	2nd place, silver medalist(s)			4	3rd place, bronze medalist(s)	
2012	Mexican Open		3rd place, bronze medalist(s)				
2013	National Championships	1st place, gold medalist(s)	6		4	4	6
2013	Cottbus World Cup					3rd place, bronze medalist(s)	2nd place, silver medalist(s)
2013	Stella Zakharova Cup	1st place, gold medalist(s)	2nd place, silver medalist(s)	2nd place, silver medalist(s)	2nd place, silver medalist(s)		1st place, gold medalist(s)
2013	Universiade	1st place, gold medalist(s)				5	

Year	Competition description	Location	Apparatus	Rank-Final	Score-Final	Rank-Qualifying	Score-Qualifying
2010	World Championships	Rotterdam	Team	1	175.397	1	234.521
2010	World Championships	Rotterdam	Uneven bars			17	14.200
2010	World Championships	Rotterdam	Balance beam	6	13.966	3	15.133
2010	World Championships	Rotterdam	Floor exercise			12	14.200
2011	European Championships	Berlin	All-around	1	57.475	2	56.900
2011	European Championships	Berlin	Uneven bars	4	14.475	5	14.450
2011	European Championships	Berlin	Balance beam	1	15.350	2	14.825
2011	European Championships	Berlin	Floor exercise	7	13.950	5	14.025
2011	World Championships	Tokyo	Team	2	175.329	2	231.062
2011	World Championships	Tokyo	All-around			31	54.333
2011	World Championships	Tokyo	Uneven bars			19	14.200
2011	World Championships	Tokyo	Balance beam			14	14.400
2011	World Championships	Tokyo	Floor exercise			132	12.133
