= Julie Croket =

Belgian artistic gymnast

- Born: 1 July 1994 (age 32) Bornem, Belgium

Gymnastics career
- Discipline: Women's artistic gymnastics
- Country represented: Belgium
- Club: GymMAX vzw
- Head coaches: Yves Kieffer, Marjorie Heuls
- Retired: 9 October 2016

Julie Croket (born 1 July 1994) is a Belgian former artistic gymnast. She was selected to represent Belgium at the 2012 Olympics, but one month before she tore her ACL, and could not compete. She was the Belgian all-around champion in 2010 and 2012, and she competed at the World Championships in 2010, 2011, 2014 and 2015.

== Personal life ==
Croket trained in Dendermonde at GymMAX vzw with her coaches Yves Kieffer and Marjorie Heuls. Along with doing gymnastics, Croket went to school to become a primary-school teacher. Her favorite event is floor exercise.

== Gymnastics career ==
=== 2010 ===
Croket became the 2010 Belgian all-around champion with a score of 53.000 She finished thirteenth with the Belgian team at the 2010 European Championships. She finished ninth in the all-around with a score of 53.375, and she was a reserve for the floor final. At the 2010 World Artistic Gymnastics Championships, Croket and her team finished fifteenth. In the qualification round, she finished 43rd in the all-around with a score of 52.782, and she did not qualify for the all-around final.

=== 2011 ===
At the International Gymnix meet in Montreal, Croket won the all-around, vault and floor exercise titles. After being selected to compete at the 2011 European Championships, she stated, "My performance in Montreal gave me high hopes that I can perform well in Berlin (the location of the 2011 European Championships), I'm well aware of the fact that one mistake might involve big consequences. I hope to get that little bit of luck to perform to my utmost best." Croket finished twelfth in the all-around final at the 2011 European Championships with a score of 54.300. She finished fourth in the beam final with a score of 14.150, and fifth in the floor final with a 14.275. Croket competed at the 2011 World Championships, and she finished sixteenth with her team.

=== 2012 ===
In January, Croket competed in the London Prepares series. The top four teams at the event would be allowed to send full teams to the 2012 Summer Olympics, but her team finished in fifth. This meant that Belgium could only send one female gymnast to the Olympics. Croket competed at the 2012 European Championships where Belgium finished in sixth place. She finished eighth in the floor final with a score of 12.866. Croket was officially named as the Belgian gymnast for the 2012 Summer Olympics. However, Croket tore her ACL at a competition in France a few weeks prior to the Olympics, so she could not compete. Gaelle Mys was selected to replace her. Afterwards, Croket said in an interview, "I went through a very difficult time, because, well, from a very early age I have been working on going to the Games. That just had to be a very good experience. And when you know that you can go, preparing all your routines for it, and then something like this happens, so close to it. That hurts, a lot! But well, after the Olympics you have to get over it."

=== 2013–2015 ===
Croket made her comeback at the 2013 FIG Challenger Cup in Anadia, Portugal, where she qualified for two event finals. She was not selected for the 2013 World Championships team due to an elbow injury.

Croket returned at the 2014 Novara Cup where Belgium won a bronze medal behind Italy and Spain. She competed at the 2014 World Championships, her first major competition since 2011, and she helped the Belgian team finish eleventh.

Croket sustained another injury and did not compete for most of 2015, but she returned in September at a friendly meet against Sweden and Austria. She scored a 13.200 on the floor exercise, but then, she had to withdraw from the rest of the meet due to an ankle injury sustained during the vault warm-ups. The injury turned out to simply be a sprained ankle, but she could only compete beam at the 2015 World Championships. The team finished eleventh and qualified to the Olympic Test Event.

=== 2016 ===
Croket began her season at the International Gymnix in Montreal where she placed fifth in the team competition along with Julie Meyers, Cindy Vandenhole, and Senna Deriks. She then helped Belgium defeat Romania in a friendly meet, and she finished sixth in the all-around with a 53.950. She was initially named the alternate for the Olympic Test Event, but she was added to the team to replace Cindy Vandenhole. At the Olympic Test Event, Croket helped Belgium finish third which qualified them as a full team to the 2016 Olympic Games for the first time since 1948. Croket was not named to Belgium's 2016 Olympic team, and after this decision she retired. In October 2016, Croket began coaching a girls' gymnastics team in Ghent.
