= 2011 Russian Cup =

Gymnastics competition in Russia

Russian Cup
- Location: Yekaterinburg, Russia
- Date: August 15–21, 2011

The 2011 Russian Cup (Russian: Кубок России 2011 Год) was held in Yekaterinburg, Russia, from 15 to 21 August 2011.

== Medalists ==
Event	Gold	Silver	Bronze
Women
Team	Central Federal District - 1	Central Federal District - 2	Moscow
All-Around	Anna Dementyeva	Viktoria Komova	Yulia Belokobylskaya
Vault	Anna Pavlova	Anna Dementyeva	Maria Paseka
Uneven Bars	Viktoria Komova	Tatiana Nabieva	Yulia Belokobylskaya
Balance Beam	Viktoria Komova	Anna Dementyeva	Yulia Belokobylskaya
Floor Exercise	Ksenia Afanasyeva	Yulia Inshina	Yulia Belokobylskaya
Men
Team	Moscow - 1	Central Federal District	Siberian Federal District
All-around	Emin Garibov	Sergey Khorokhordin	Nikita Ignatyev
Floor	Denis Ablyazin	Andrei Cherkasov	Dmitri Barkalov
Pommel horse	Andrei Perevoznikov	David Belyavskiy	Vladimir Olennikov
Rings	Konstantin Pluzhnikov	Nikita Ignatyev	Emin Garibov
Vault	Denis Ablyazin	Mikhail Bodnar	Nikita Lezhankin
Parallel bars	Nikita Ignatyev	Dmitri Gogotov	Maksim Devyatovskiy
High bar	Emin Garibov	Mikhail Bodnar	Maksim Devyatovskiy
