= Gymnastics at the 2010 Summer Youth Olympics – Women's balance beam =

These are the results of the women's balance beam competition, one of five events for female competitors of the artistic gymnastics discipline contested in the gymnastics at the 2010 Summer Youth Olympics in Singapore. The qualification and final rounds took place on August 17 at the Bishan Sports Hall.

== Medalists ==
Gold	Silver	Bronze
Tan Sixin; China	Carlotta Ferlito; Italy	Angela Donald; Australia

== Results ==
=== Qualification ===
42 gymnasts competed in the uneven bars event in the artistic gymnastics qualification round on August 17. The eight highest scoring gymnasts advanced to the final on August 22.

=== Final ===
Rank	Gymnast	A-score	B-score	Penalty	Total
Gold medal	Tan Sixin (CHN)	6.3	9.250	—	15.550
Silver medal	Carlotta Ferlito (ITA)	5.8	9.025	—	14.825
Bronze medal	Angela Donald (AUS)	6.0	8.450	—	14.450
4	Ana Sofía Gómez (GUA)	5.6	8.500	—	14.100
5	Harumy Freitas (BRA)	5.1	8.350	—	13.450
6	Alina Kravchenko (UKR)	4.7	8.100	—	12.800
7	Viktoria Komova (RUS)	5.4	6.600	—	12.000
8	Jonna Adlerteg (SWE)	4.7	7.125	—	11.825
