= Gymnastics at the 2010 Summer Youth Olympics – Women's artistic individual all-around =

Junior women's artistic individual all-around competition at the 2010 Summer Youth Olympics was held on August 19 at the Bishan Sports Hall.

For each competitor in the women's qualification, the scores in artistic gymnastics is based on two separate scores that are then combined in order to come to the final score. The A score measures the difficulty of each element (and combinations of elements) within the routine, while the B score evaluates the performance, i.e. the "execution, composition and artistry" of the routine. For further information, please see the Code of Points article. For all four apparatus were summed to give an all-around qualification score. The top 18 competitors moved on to the individual all-around final. In the individual all-around final, each gymnast competed on each apparatus again. Only scores from the final were used to determine final rankings.

== Medalists ==
Gold	Silver	Bronze
Viktoria Komova; Russia	Tan Sixin; China	Carlotta Ferlito; Italy

== Final round results ==
Position	Gymnast	Vault (gymnastics)	Uneven bars	Balance beam	Floor (gymnastics)	Total
1st place, gold medalist(s)	Viktoria Komova (RUS)	15.650	15.450	15.250	14.900	61.250
2nd place, silver medalist(s)	Tan Sixin (CHN)	14.400	14.350	15.350	14.400	58.500
3rd place, bronze medalist(s)	Carlotta Ferlito (ITA)	14.150	12.750	14.500	13.950	55.350
4	Natsumi Sasada (JPN)	13.800	14.050	14.100	13.150	55.100
5	Ana Sofía Gómez (GUA)	13.400	13.100	14.150	13.400	54.050
6	Diana Bulimar (ROU)	13.650	12.700	13.900	13.700	53.950
7	Angela Donald (AUS)	13.200	13.100	13.800	13.200	53.300
8	Tess Moonen (NED)	13.600	13.450	13.050	13.100	53.200
9	Maria Vargas (ESP)	14.250	12.800	13.150	12.650	52.850
10	Jonna Adlerteg (SWE)	13.650	13.250	12.550	13.150	52.600
11	Harumy Freitas (BRA)	13.850	11.800	13.450	13.150	52.250
12	Elisa Haemmerle (AUT)	13.400	12.400	12.700	13.350	51.850
13	Madeline Gardiner (CAN)	13.800	13.150	12.100	12.050	51.100
14	Dilnoza Abdusalimova (UZB)	13.450	12.350	12.350	12.550	50.700
15	Kosthia Requena (VEN)	13.350	11.150	13.250	12.150	49.900
16	Park Kyungjing (KOR)	13.600	11.000	13.250	11.650	49.500
17	Alina Kravchenko (UKR)	13.250	11.700	11.950	11.250	48.150
18	Jessica Hogg (GBR)	13.250	11.150	10.050	13.000	47.450

== Reserves ==
The reserves for the All Around Final were:

- Bianka S. Mityko (HUN) (19th place)
- Nadia Baeriswyl (SUI) (20th place)
- Elisavet Tsakou (GRE) (21st place)
- Demet Mutlu (TUR) (22nd place)
