= 2011 European Artistic Gymnastics Championships =

4th Individual European Artistic Gymnastics Championships
- Venue: Max-Schmeling-Halle
- Location: Berlin, Germany
- Dates: 4 to 10 April 2011
- Nations: Members of the European Union of Gymnastics

The 4th Individual European Artistic Gymnastics Championships for both Men and Women was held in Berlin, Germany from 4 April 2011 until 10 April 2011. The event was held at the Max-Schmeling-Halle. 157 male gymnasts from 39 countries with and 86 female gymnasts from 32 countries participated.

== Participation ==
=== Participating nations ===
In order to participate, nations must be members of the European Union of Gymnastics.

- Armenia
- Austria
- Azerbaijan
- Belgium
- Belarus
- Bulgaria
- Croatia
- Cyprus
- Czech Republic
- Denmark
- Finland
- France
- Great Britain
- Georgia
- Germany
- Greece
- Hungary
- Ireland
- Iceland
- Israel
- Italy
- Latvia
- Lithuania
- Luxembourg
- Monaco
- Netherlands
- Norway
- Poland
- Portugal
- Romania
- Russia
- Slovenia
- Serbia
- Spain
- Switzerland
- Slovakia
- Sweden
- Turkey
- Ukraine

=== Oldest and youngest competitors ===
Male

Senior	Name	Country	Date of birth	Age
Youngest	Christopher O'Connor	Ireland	12/12/93	17 years
Oldest	Espen Jansen	Norway	13/12/68	42 years

Female

Senior	Name	Country	Date of birth	Age
Youngest	Yulia Belokobylskaya	Russia	14/11/95	15 years
Oldest	Oksana Chusovitina	Germany	19/06/75	35 years

== Medal winners ==
Event	Gold	Silver	Bronze
Men
All-around	Philipp Boy (GER)	Flavius Koczi (ROU)	Daniel Purvis (GBR); Mykola Kuksenkov (UKR)
Floor	Flavius Koczi (ROU)	Alexander Shatilov (ISR)	Anton Golotsutskov (RUS)
Pommel horse	Krisztián Berki (HUN)	Cyril Tommasone (FRA)	Harutyun Merdinyan (ARM)
Rings	Konstantin Pluzhnikov (RUS)	Aleksandr Balandin (RUS)	Eleftherios Petrounias (GRE)
Vault	Thomas Bouhail (FRA)	Samir Aït Saïd (FRA)	Anton Golotsutskov (RUS)
Parallel bars	Marcel Nguyen (GER)	Epke Zonderland (NED)	Vasileios Tsolakidis (GRE)
Horizontal bar	Epke Zonderland (NED)	Philipp Boy (GER)	Marcel Nguyen (GER)
Women
All-around	Anna Dementyeva (RUS)	Elisabeth Seitz (GER)	Amelia Racea (ROM)
Vault	Sandra Izbașa (ROU)	Oksana Chusovitina (GER)	Ariella Käslin (SUI)
Uneven bars	Beth Tweddle (GBR)	Tatiana Nabieva (RUS)	Kim Bùi (GER)
Balance beam	Anna Dementyeva (RUS)	Carlotta Ferlito (ITA)	Elisabetta Preziosa (ITA)
Floor	Sandra Izbașa (ROU)	Diana Chelaru (ROU)	Yulia Belokobylskaya (RUS)

== Men's ==
=== Individual all-around ===
Oldest and youngest competitors

Senior	Name	Country	Date of birth	Age
Youngest	Artur Davtyan	Armenia	08/08/92	18 years
Oldest	Enrico Pozzo	Italy	12/02/81	30 years

Position	Gymnast	Floor (gymnastics)	Pommel horse	Rings (gymnastics)	Vault (gymnastics)	Parallel bars	Horizontal bar	Total
1st place, gold medalist(s)	Philipp Boy (GER)	15.150	13.825	14.625	15.950	14.200	15.125	88.875
2nd place, silver medalist(s)	Flavius Koczi (ROU)	15.250	14.575	14.450	16.100	14.225	14.225	88.825
3rd place, bronze medalist(s)	Daniel Purvis (GBR)	15.175	14.125	14.225	15.900	14.575	14.350	88.350
3rd place, bronze medalist(s)	Mykola Kuksenkov (UKR)	14.675	14.025	14.375	15.600	14.550	15.125	88.350
5	Nikita Ignatyev (RUS)	14.500	12.825	14.975	15.950	14.975	14.425	87.650
6	Marcel Nguyen (GER)	14.800	13.500	14.475	15.800	15.325	13.650	87.550
7	Rafael Martínez (ESP)	14.900	13.625	14.150	15.400	13.750	14.950	86.775
8	Vitaliy Nakonechnyy (UKR)	14.200	14.300	13.625	15.575	14.400	14.575	86.675
9	Maxim Devyatovskiy (RUS)	14.875	12.225	15.000	14.500	14.325	14.950	85.875
10	Claudio Capelli (SUI)	14.325	13.875	13.850	14.850	14.875	13.975	85.750
11	Kristian Thomas (GBR)	15.125	13.975	14.050	16.025	12.775	13.750	85.700
12	Samuel Piasecký (SVK)	14.125	13.650	13.300	15.350	14.600	14.625	85.650
13	Manuel Almeida Campos (POR)	14.425	13.275	13.900	15.300	14.425	14.150	85.475
14	Bart Deurloo (NED)	14.700	13.250	13.275	15.950	13.850	14.400	85.425
15	Dzmitry Savitski (BLR)	14.050	13.750	14.100	15.575	14.575	12.950	85.000
16	Cyril Tommasone (FRA)	13.300	14.300	13.300	15.200	14.250	14.550	84.900
17	Daniel Groves (SUI)	14.700	13.525	13.000	15.525	14.150	13.825	84.725
18	Roman Kulesza (POL)	13.625	12.800	13.325	15.450	14.725	14.600	84.525
19	Filip Ude (CRO)	14.900	14.700	12.450	14.825	13.025	14.525	84.425
20	Artur Davtyan (ARM)	13.750	13.625	14.125	15.600	13.950	13.300	84.350
21	Sergio Muñoz (ESP)	13.500	13.725	14.275	15.875	12.650	13.650	83.675
22	Enrico Pozzo (ITA)	14.000	11.600	13.625	15.775	13.925	14.550	83.475
23	Gustavo Palma Simões (POR)	13.900	13.575	14.475	13.925	12.900	12.825	81.600
24	Fabian Leimlehner (AUT)	13.150	11.075	13.150	15.125	13.825	14.325	80.650

=== Finals ===
==== Floor ====
Oldest and youngest competitors

Senior	Name	Country	Date of birth	Age
Youngest	Denis Ablyazin	Russia	03/08/92	18 years
Oldest	Anton Golotsutskov	Russia	28/07/85	25 years

Position	Gymnast	D Score	E Score	Penalty	Total
1st place, gold medalist(s)	Flavius Koczi (ROU)	6.600	8.900		15.500
2nd place, silver medalist(s)	Alexander Shatilov (ISR)	6.500	8.900		15.400
3rd place, bronze medalist(s)	Anton Golotsutskov (RUS)	6.400	8.925		15.325
4	Thomas Bouhail (FRA)	6.100	9.200		15.300
4	Kristian Thomas (GBR)	6.200	9.100		15.300
6	Denis Ablyazin (RUS)	6.700	8.650	0.1	15.250
7	Daniel Purvis (GBR)	6.400	8.000		14.400
8	Philipp Boy (GER)	6.200	8.075		14.275

==== Pommel horse ====
Oldest and youngest competitors

Senior	Name	Country	Date of birth	Age
Youngest	Sebastian Krimmer	Germany	21/06/90	20 years
Oldest	Alberto Busnari	Italy	04/10/78	32 years

Position	Gymnast	D Score	E Score	Penalty	Total
1st place, gold medalist(s)	Krisztián Berki (HUN)	6.700	8.925		15.625
2nd place, silver medalist(s)	Cyril Tommasone (FRA)	6.400	8.650		15.050
3rd place, bronze medalist(s)	Harutyun Merdinyan (ARM)	6.400	8.550		14.950
4	Vid Hidvégi (HUN)	6.300	8.425		14.725
5	Sebastian Krimmer (GER)	5.900	8.425		14.325
6	Louis Smith (GBR)	6.600	7.550		14.150
7	Alberto Busnari (ITA)	6.700	7.175		13.875
8	Pierre Yves Bény (FRA)	5.900	6.550		12.450

==== Rings ====
Oldest and youngest competitors

Senior	Name	Country	Date of birth	Age
Youngest	Eleftherios Petrounias	Greece	30/11/90	20 years
Oldest	Matteo Morandi	Italy	08/10/81	29 years

Position	Gymnast	D Score	E Score	Penalty	Total
1st place, gold medalist(s)	Konstantin Pluzhnikov (RUS)	6.700	9.150		15.850
2nd place, silver medalist(s)	Aleksandr Balandin (RUS)	6.700	9.075		15.775
3rd place, bronze medalist(s)	Eleftherios Petrounias (GRE)	6.800	8.875		15.675
4	Matteo Morandi (ITA)	6.700	8.950		15.650
5	Danny Pinheiro-Rodrigues (FRA)	6.800	8.725		15.525
6	Yuri van Gelder (NED)	6.800	8.675		15.475
7	Thomas Taranu (GER)	6.600	8.325		14.925
8	Pierre Yves Bény (FRA)	6.400	8.475		14.875

==== Vault ====
Oldest and youngest competitors

Senior	Name	Country	Date of birth	Age
Youngest	Igor Radivilov	Ukraine	19/10/92	18 years
Oldest	Anton Golotsutskov	Russia	28/07/85	25 years

Rank	Gymnast	D Score	E Score	Pen.	Score 1	D Score	E Score	Pen.	Score 2	Total
1st place, gold medalist(s)	Thomas Bouhail (FRA)	7.000	9.500		16.500	7.000	9.225		16.225	16.362
2nd place, silver medalist(s)	Samir Aït Saïd (FRA)	7.000	9.200		16.200	7.000	9.325		16.325	16.262
3rd place, bronze medalist(s)	Anton Golotsutskov (RUS)	7.000	9.300		16.300	7.000	9.050	0.1	15.950	16.125
4	Flavius Koczi (ROU)	7.000	9.375		16.375	7.000	8.325		15.325	15.850
4	Jeffrey Wammes (NED)	6.600	9.275	0.1	15.775	6.800	9.225	0.1	15.925	15.850
6	Oleksandr Yakubovskyi (UKR)	6.600	8.375	0.3	14.675	7.000	8.600		15.600	15.137
7	Marek Lyszczarz (POL)	7.000	8.325		15.325	6.600	8.225	0.1	14.725	15.025
8	Igor Radivilov (UKR)	7.000	8.125	0.3	14.850	6.600	8.175	0.3	14.475	14.662
Rank	Gymnast	Vault 1				Vault 2				Total

==== Parallel bars ====
Oldest and youngest competitors

Senior	Name	Country	Date of birth	Age
Youngest	Mykola Kuksenkov	Ukraine	02/06/89	21 years
Oldest	Mitja Petkovšek	Slovenia	06/02/77	34 years

Position	Gymnast	D Score	E Score	Penalty	Total
1st place, gold medalist(s)	Marcel Nguyen (GER)	6.700	8.825		15.525
2nd place, silver medalist(s)	Epke Zonderland (NED)	6.000	9.300		15.300
3rd place, bronze medalist(s)	Vasileios Tsolakidis (GRE)	6.000	9.075		15.075
4	Mykola Kuksenkov (UKR)	6.200	8.850		15.050
5	Pierre-Yves Bény (FRA)	6.000	8.950		14.950
6	Roman Kulesza (POL)	6.000	8.850		14.850
7	Maxim Devyatovskiy (RUS)	6.100	8.625		14.725
8	Mitja Petkovšek (SLO)	4.600	8.075		12.675

==== Horizontal bar ====
Oldest and youngest competitors

Senior	Name	Country	Date of birth	Age
Youngest	Sam Oldham	United Kingdom	17/02/93	18 years
Oldest	Roman Kulesza	Poland	02/03/83	28 years

Position	Gymnast	D Score	E Score	Penalty	Total
1st place, gold medalist(s)	Epke Zonderland (NED)	7.700	7.875		15.575
2nd place, silver medalist(s)	Philipp Boy (GER)	7.200	8.150		15.350
3rd place, bronze medalist(s)	Marcel Nguyen (GER)	7.100	8.200		15.300
4	Sam Oldham (GBR)	6.400	8.775		15.175
5	Marijo Možnik (CRO)	6.600	8.525		15.125
6	Mykola Kuksenkov (UKR)	6.700	7.750		14.450
7	Roman Kulesza (POL)	6.100	7.975		14.075
8	Fabian Gonzalez (ESP)	6.100	7.125		13.225

== Women's ==
=== Individual all-around ===
Oldest and youngest competitors

Senior	Name	Country	Date of birth	Age
Youngest	Jonna Adlerteg	Sweden	06/06/95	15 years
Oldest	Vasiliki Millousi	Greece	04/05/84	26 years

Position	Gymnast	Vault (gymnastics)	Uneven bars	Balance beam	Floor (gymnastics)	Total
1st place, gold medalist(s)	Anna Dementyeva (RUS)	13.600	14.250	15.150	14.475	57.475
2nd place, silver medalist(s)	Elisabeth Seitz (GER)	14.625	14.725	13.625	13.725	56.700
3rd place, bronze medalist(s)	Amelia Racea (ROM)	14.400	13.825	14.550	13.825	56.600
4	Diana Chelaru (ROM)	14.350	13.450	13.975	14.550	56.325
5	Carlotta Ferlito (ITA)	13.875	13.175	14.875	13.900	55.825
6	Vanessa Ferrari (ITA)	13.875	13.900	13.750	13.950	55.475
7	Céline van Gerner (NED)	13.525	14.375	13.750	13.800	55.450
8	Ariella Käslin (SUI)	14.750	13.625	14.150	12.850	55.375
9	Giulia Steingruber (SUI)	15.375	13.325	12.875	13.450	55.025
10	Marine Brevet (FRA)	13.525	13.350	14.025	13.775	54.675
11	Marta Pihan-Kulesza (POL)	13.575	13.025	14.225	13.700	54.525
12	Julie Croket (BEL)	14.000	13.050	13.075	14.175	54.300
13	Hannah Whelan (GBR)	13.525	12.850	13.950	13.850	54.175
14	Aagje Vanwalleghem (BEL)	13.775	13.150	13.150	13.500	53.575
15	Vasiliki Millousi (GRE)	12.700	13.725	13.975	13.125	53.525
16	Danusia Francis (GBR)	13.500	13.125	13.400	13.350	53.375
17	Dorina Böczögő (HUN)	13.500	13.075	13.175	12.850	52.600
18	Stefani Bismpikou (GRE)	13.200	12.925	13.575	12.525	52.225
19	Jana Šikulová (CZE)	13.650	13.750	11.975	12.700	52.075
20	Veronica Wagner (SWE)	13.600	11.850	13.525	12.775	51.750
21	Yvette Moshage (NED)	13.275	13.000	12.475	12.775	51.525
22	Valeriia Maksiuta (ISR)	13.925	11.950	11.575	12.125	49.575
23	Jonna Adlerteg (SWE)	13.200	13.350	10.275	12.675	49.500
24	Aliya Mustafina (RUS)	15.375				15.375*

- Aliya Mustafina tore her left ACL landing her Yurchenko 2.5 (the Amanar), and was forced to withdraw from the remainder of the competition.

=== Finals ===
==== Vault ====
Oldest and youngest competitors

Senior	Name	Country	Date of birth	Age
Youngest	Tatiana Nabieva	Russia	21/11/94	16 years
Oldest	Oksana Chusovitina	Germany	19/06/75	35 years

Rank	Gymnast	D Score	E Score	Pen.	Score 1	D Score	E Score	Pen.	Score 2	Total
1st place, gold medalist(s)	Sandra Izbașa (ROU)	5.800	8.900		14.700	5.600	9.050		14.650	14.675
2nd place, silver medalist(s)	Oksana Chusovitina (GER)	6.300	8.500		14.800	5.500	8.775		14.275	14.537
3rd place, bronze medalist(s)	Ariella Käslin (SUI)	6.300	8.650		14.950	5.800	8.200		14.000	14.475
4	Tatiana Nabieva (RUS)	5.800	8.700		14.500	5.200	8.875		14.075	14.287
5	Elisabeth Seitz (GER)	5.800	8.875		14.675	5.000	8.700		13.700	14.187
6	Giulia Steingruber (SUI)	6.300	7.600		13.900	5.200	8.900		14.100	14.000
7	Amelia Racea (ROU)	5.800	8.200		14.000	4.800	8.650		13.450	13.725
8	Nastassia Marachkouskaya (BLR)	5.000	8.825		13.825	4.600	7.700		12.300	13.062
Rank	Gymnast	Vault 1				Vault 2				Total

==== Uneven bars ====
Oldest and youngest competitors

Senior	Name	Country	Date of birth	Age
Youngest	Anna Dementyeva	Russia	28/12/94	16 years
Oldest	Beth Tweddle	United Kingdom	01/04/85	26 years

Position	Gymnast	D Score	E Score	Penalty	Total
1st place, gold medalist(s)	Beth Tweddle (GBR)	6.700	8.400		15.100
2nd place, silver medalist(s)	Tatiana Nabieva (RUS)	6.300	8.775		15.075
3rd place, bronze medalist(s)	Kim Bùi (GER)	6.200	8.475		14.675
4	Anna Dementyeva (RUS)	5.800	8.675		14.475
5	Elisabeth Seitz (GER)	6.400	7.775		14.175
6	Aagje Vanwalleghem (BEL)	6.000	8.075		14.075
7	Céline van Gerner (NED)	5.800	8.175		13.975
8	Vanessa Ferrari (ITA)	5.800	7.050		12.850

==== Balance beam ====
Oldest and youngest competitors

Senior	Name	Country	Date of birth	Age
Youngest	Carlotta Ferlito	Italy	15/02/95	16 years
Oldest	Vasiliki Millousi	Greece	04/05/84	26 years

Position	Gymnast	D Score	E Score	Penalty	Total
1st place, gold medalist(s)	Anna Dementyeva (RUS)	6.700	8.650		15.350
2nd place, silver medalist(s)	Carlotta Ferlito (ITA)	5.900	8.600		14.500
3rd place, bronze medalist(s)	Elisabetta Preziosa (ITA)	5.900	8.425		14.325
4	Julie Croket (BEL)	5.900	8.250		14.150
5	Ariella Käslin (SUI)	5.900	8.225		14.125
6	Vasiliki Millousi (GRE)	5.500	8.300		13.800
7	Marta Pihan-Kulesza (POL)	5.900	6.950		12.850
8	Hannah Whelan (GBR)	5.700	6.250		11.950

==== Floor ====
Oldest and youngest competitors

Senior	Name	Country	Date of birth	Age
Youngest	Yulia Belokobylskaya	Russia	14/12/95	15 years
Oldest	Beth Tweddle	United Kingdom	01/04/85	26 years

Position	Gymnast	D Score	E Score	Penalty	Total
1st place, gold medalist(s)	Sandra Izbașa (ROU)	5.800	8.700		14.500
2nd place, silver medalist(s)	Diana Chelaru (ROM)	5.900	8.575		14.475
3rd place, bronze medalist(s)	Yulia Belokobylskaya (RUS)	5.900	8.550		14.450
4	Beth Tweddle (GBR)	6.000	8.300		14.300
5	Julie Croket (BEL)	5.600	8.675		14.275
6	Carlotta Ferlito (ITA)	5.500	8.550		14.050
7	Anna Dementyeva (RUS)	5.700	8.250		13.950
8	Tünde Csillag (HUN)	5.300	7.950	0.1	13.150

== Medal count ==
=== Men ===
Rank	Nation	Gold	Silver	Bronze	Total
1	Germany	2	1	1	4
2	France	1	2	0	3
3	Russia	1	1	2	4
4	Netherlands	1	1	0	2
4	Romania	1	1	0	2
6	Great Britain	1	0	0	1
6	Hungary	1	0	0	1
8	Israel	0	1	0	1
9	Greece	0	0	2	2
10	Armenia	0	0	1	1
10	Ukraine	0	0	1	1
Totals (11 entries)		8	7	7	22

=== Women ===
Rank	Nation	Gold	Silver	Bronze	Total
1	Romania	2	1	1	4
1	Russia	2	1	1	4
3	Great Britain	1	0	0	1
4	Germany	0	2	1	3
5	Italy	0	1	1	2
6	Switzerland	0	0	1	1
Totals (6 entries)		5	5	5	15

=== Overall ===
Rank	Nation	Gold	Silver	Bronze	Total
1	Russia	3	2	3	8
2	Romania	3	2	1	6
3	Germany	2	3	2	7
4	France	1	2	0	3
5	Netherlands	1	1	0	2
6	Great Britain	1	0	1	2
7	Hungary	1	0	0	1
8	Italy	0	1	1	2
9	Israel	0	1	0	1
10	Greece	0	0	2	2
11	Armenia	0	0	1	1
11	Switzerland	0	0	1	1
11	Ukraine	0	0	1	1
Totals (13 entries)		12	12	13	37
