= Gymnastics at the 2012 Summer Olympics – Women's artistic individual all-around =

Women's artistic individual all-around at the Games of the XXX Olympiad
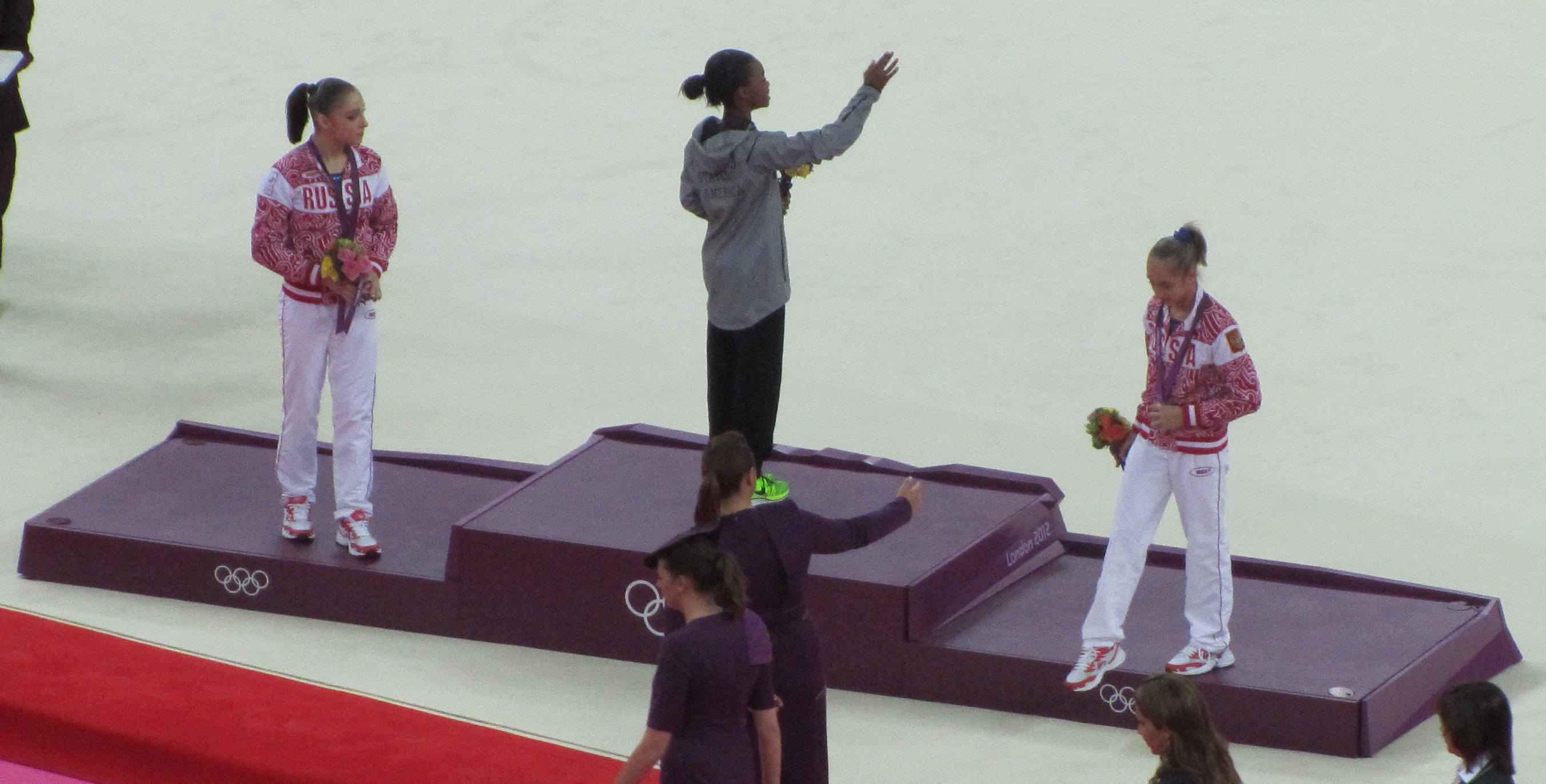
- Women's individual all-around medal ceremony (2012)
- Venue: North Greenwich Arena
- Date: 2 August 2012
- Competitors: 28 from 21 nations

Medalists
1st place, gold medalist(s)		Gabby Douglas	United States
2nd place, silver medalist(s)		Viktoria Komova	Russia
3rd place, bronze medalist(s)		Aliya Mustafina	Russia

The women's artistic individual all-around competition at the 2012 Summer Olympics in London was held at the North Greenwich Arena on 2 August.

== Format of competition ==
The top 24 competitors in the qualification round (with a limit of two per country), based on combined scores on the four apparatuses, advanced to the individual all-around final. In the final, gymnasts performed on each apparatus again. Qualification scores were then ignored, with only final-round scores counting.

== Qualification results ==
Position	Gymnast	Country	Vault (gymnastics)	Uneven bars	Balance beam	Floor (gymnastics)	Total
1st	Viktoria Komova	Russia	15.633	15.833	15.266	13.900	60.632
2nd	Aly Raisman	United States	15.800	14.166	15.100	15.325	60.391
3rd	Gabby Douglas	United States	15.900	15.333	15.266	13.766	60.265
5th	Aliya Mustafina	Russia	15.133	15.700	14.700	14.433	59.966
6th	Deng Linlin	China	14.833	14.166	15.166	13.833	57.998
7th	Vanessa Ferrari	Italy	14.366	14.233	14.433	14.900	57.932
8th	Asuka Teramoto	Japan	14.600	14.566	14.466	14.233	57.865
9th	Larisa Iordache	Romania	15.100	14.100	14.800	13.800	57.800
10th	Huang Qiushuang	China	15.000	15.266	13.866	13.575	57.707
11th	Sandra Izbașa	Romania	15.500	12.366	14.600	15.066	57.532
13th	Jessica López	Venezuela	14.566	14.266	13.933	13.900	56.665
14th	Elisabeth Seitz	Germany	14.800	15.166	12.700	13.800	56.466
15th	Rebecca Tunney	Great Britain	14.400	14.825	13.166	14.000	56.391
16th	Ana Sofía Gómez	Guatemala	14.533	13.266	14.333	14.000	56.132
17th	Hannah Whelan	Great Britain	14.500	14.200	13.066	13.933	55.699
18th	Dominique Pegg	Canada	14.133	13.275	13.566	14.233	55.657
19th	Céline van Gerner	Netherlands	13.700	14.866	14.100	12.966	55.632
20th	Carlotta Ferlito	Italy	14.100	13.075	14.425	13.900	55.500
23rd	Giulia Steingruber	Switzerland	14.783	13.266	13.766	12.900	54.715
24th	Emily Little	Australia	14.766	13.433	13.633	12.666	54.498
25th	Aurélie Malaussena	France	14.033	13.300	13.700	13.366	54.399
26th	Marta Pihan-Kulesza	Poland	13.833	14.033	12.166	14.333	54.365
27th	Rie Tanaka	Japan	13.000	14.633	13.400	13.300	54.333
28th	Ashleigh Brennan	Australia	13.700	13.266	13.066	14.200	54.232

Only two gymnasts from each country were allowed to advance to the all-around final. Four gymnasts placed in the top 24 in qualifications but did not advance because of the two-per-country rule:

- Jordyn Wieber (USA) (4th place)
- Anastasia Grishina (RUS) (12th place)
- Jennifer Pinches (GBR) (21st place)
- Yao Jinnan (CHN) (22nd place)

== Final results ==
Rank	Gymnast	Vault (gymnastics)	Uneven bars	Balance beam	Floor (gymnastics)	Total
1st place, gold medalist(s)	Gabby Douglas (USA)	15.966 (1)	15.733 (3)	15.500 (1)	15.033 (4)	62.232
2nd place, silver medalist(s)	Viktoria Komova (RUS)	15.466 (3)	15.966 (2)	15.441 (2)	15.100 (3)	61.973
3rd place, bronze medalist(s)	Aliya Mustafina (RUS)	15.233 (5)	16.100 (1)	13.633 (18)	14.600 (6)	59.566*
4	Aly Raisman (USA)	15.900 (2)	14.333 (=9)	14.200 (10)	15.133 (2)	59.566*
5	Sandra Izbașa (ROU)	15.333 (4)	13.900 (=17)	14.400 (=7)	15.200 (1)	58.833
6	Deng Linlin (CHN)	14.900 (9)	14.266 (12)	15.300 (3)	13.933 (=13)	58.399
7	Huang Qiushuang (CHN)	14.916 (8)	15.133 (5)	14.133 (=12)	13.933 (=13)	58.115
8	Vanessa Ferrari (ITA)	14.600 (16)	14.033 (15)	14.500 (6)	14.866 (5)	57.999
9	Larisa Iordache (ROU)	14.933 (7)	14.233 (13)	14.966 (4)	13.833 (16)	57.965
10	Elisabeth Seitz (GER)	14.766 (=13)	15.166 (4)	13.800 (14)	13.633 (18)	57.365
11	Asuka Teramoto (JPN)	14.766 (=13)	14.300 (11)	14.300 (9)	13.966 (12)	57.332
12	Céline van Gerner (NED)	14.133 (20)	14.966 (7)	14.133 (=12)	14.000 (11)	57.226
13	Rebecca Tunney (GBR)	14.866 (=10)	15.000 (6)	13.133 (=20)	13.933 (=13)	56.392
14	Giulia Steingruber (SUI)	15.116 (6)	13.600 (21)	14.166 (11)	13.266 (=21)	56.148
15	Emily Little (AUS)	14.866 (=10)	13.933 (16)	13.666 (17)	13.300 (20)	55.765
16	Rie Tanaka (JPN)	14.166 (=18)	14.500 (8)	13.700 (=15)	13.266 (=21)	55.632
17	Dominique Pegg (CAN)	14.566 (17)	13.800 (19)	13.166 (19)	14.033 (10)	55.565
18	Jessica López (VEN)	14.800 (12)	13.900 (=17)	13.000 (22)	13.800 (17)	55.500
19	Marta Pihan-Kulesza (POL)	13.933 (21)	14.333 (=9)	12.933 (23)	14.266 (7)	55.465
20	Ashleigh Brennan (AUS)	13.233 (23)	13.533 (22)	14.400 (=7)	14.166 (8)	55.332
21	Carlotta Ferlito (ITA)	14.166 (=18)	13.433 (23)	14.766 (5)	12.733 (23)	55.098
22	Ana Sofía Gómez (GUA)	14.633 (15)	13.733 (20)	13.133 (=20)	13.400 (19)	54.899
23	Aurélie Malaussena (FRA)	13.800 (22)	12.800 (24)	12.066 (24)	11.500 (24)	50.166
24	Hannah Whelan (GBR)	0.000 (24)	14.166 (14)	13.700 (=15)	14.133 (9)	41.999

*Aliya Mustafina and Aly Raisman finished with the same total score of 59.566. To break the tie, each gymnast's lowest score was dropped, and their remaining three scores were summed. The resulting totals were 45.933 for Mustafina and 45.366 for Raisman, breaking the tie and earning Mustafina the bronze medal.

== See also ==
- List of Olympic medalists in gymnastics (women)#All-Around, Individual
