= Aurélie Malaussena =

French artistic gymnast

Aurelie Malaussena
- Nicknames: Aurel, Malauss, Lili
- Born: 17 October 1993 (age 32) Grasse, France
- Height: 1.63 m (5 ft 4 in)

Gymnastics career
- Discipline: Women's artistic gymnastics
- Country represented: France (2010-2014)
- Club: Elan Gymnique Rouennais
- Head coaches: Celine Demay, Eric Demay
- Choreographer: Monique Hagard
- Music: 2010-2012 - "Seisouso" by Cirque du Soleil
- Retired: June 2014
Medal record
Women's artistic gymnastics
Representing France
Mediterranean Games
Gold medal – first place	2009 Pescara	Team All-Around

Aurélie Malaussena (born 17 October 1993) is a retired French artistic gymnast. She competed for the national team at the 2012 Summer Olympics, where she qualified for the Individual All-Around final, and finished 23rd.

== Career ==
At the 2007 and 2008 French National Championships, Malaussena finished third in the all-around in the junior division. Malaussena made her senior international debut at the 2009 Mediterranean Games. She helped the team win a gold medal by contributing scores on vault, bars, and beam. Malaussena finished second in the all-around at the 2010 National Championships. At the 2010 European Championships, she competed on vault and bars to help the team finish fourth. She then competed at the 2010 World Championships. The French team finished eleventh in the qualification, and Malaussena qualified for the all-around final in 22nd with a 55.098. She finished 23rd in the final with a 54.265 after a fall on floor.

Malaussena competed at the 2011 World Championships, and helped the French team finish 10th, which qualified them for the 2012 Gymnastics Olympic Test Event. Individually, she finished 21st in the all-around final with a 54.498. Malaussena began the Olympic season by competing in the Doha World Cup. She finished 18th on the uneven bars with an 11.750. She had qualified for the balance beam final in seventh, but withdrew.

=== 2012 Summer Olympics ===
France qualified a full team for the 2012 Summer Olympics at the 2012 Gymnastics Olympic Test Event. Malaussena was named the captain of the French team. In the qualification round, France finished 11th. Individually, she finished 23rd in the all-around final with a 50.166. When asked if she met her goals at the Olympics, she said, "Personally, yes. But when we part, it was more a collective goal. And no, it did not live up to what we thought. We wanted to make the team final, being in the top eight, and it was not the case. Individual objectives of the other girls were not made either. Collectively, it has been a disappointment. But individually, I was very happy to get in the final of the all-around competition."

After the Olympics, Malaussena competed only at domestic events, and she retired in 2014.
