= 2011 World Artistic Gymnastics Championships =

Gymnastics competition

2011 World Artistic Gymnastics Championships

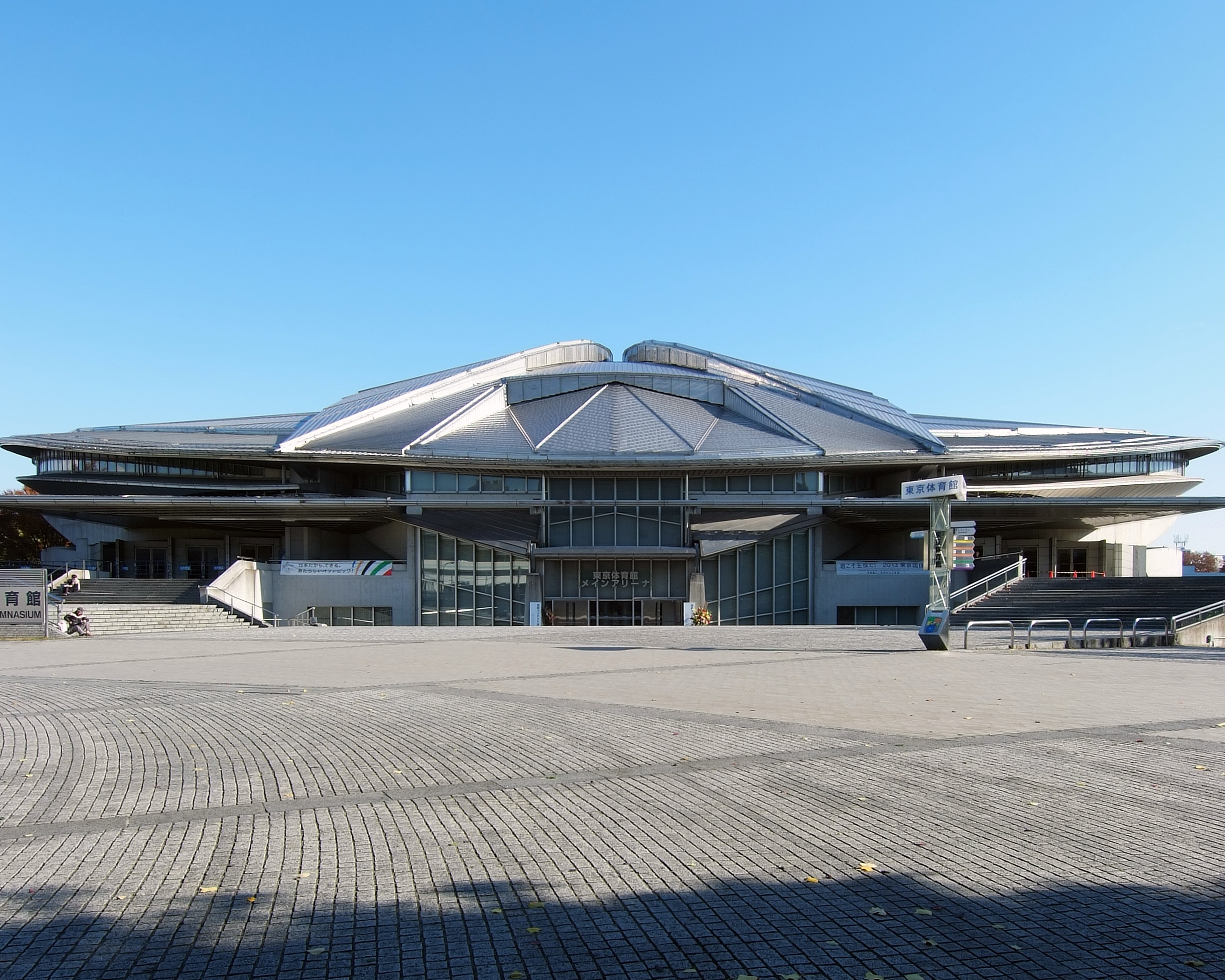
- Tokyo Metropolitan Gymnasium, where the competition took place
- Venue: Tokyo Metropolitan Gymnasium
- Location: Tokyo, Japan
- Start date: October 7, 2011
- End date: October 16, 2011
- Competitors: 528

The 2011 World Artistic Gymnastics Championships were held in Tokyo, Japan, from October 7–16, 2011, at the Tokyo Metropolitan Gymnasium. Due to uncertainty over the nuclear situation following the 2011 Tōhoku earthquake and tsunami, the International Federation of Gymnastics revealed it was considering moving the event, but on May 22 FIG president Bruno Grandi announced that the World Championships would take place in Tokyo as planned.

== Participating countries ==
83 countries participated, which included gymnasts from

- Albania
- Argentina
- Armenia
- Australia
- Austria
- Azerbaijan
- Bangladesh
- Belarus
- Belgium
- Brazil
- Bulgaria
- Canada
- Chile
- China
- Chinese Taipei
- Colombia
- Costa Rica
- Croatia
- Cyprus
- Czech Republic
- Denmark
- Dominican Republic
- Egypt
- El Salvador
- Finland
- France
- (Georgia (country)) Georgia
- Germany
- Greece
- Guatemala
- Hong Kong
- Hungary
- Iceland
- India
- Indonesia
- (Republic of Ireland) Ireland
- Israel
- Italy
- Jamaica
- Japan
- Kazakhstan
- Kuwait
- Latvia
- Lithuania
- Luxembourg
- Malaysia
- Mexico
- Monaco
- Mongolia
- Namibia
- Netherlands
- New Zealand
- Norway
- Peru
- Philippines
- Poland
- Portugal
- Puerto Rico
- Qatar
- Romania
- Russia
- Saudi Arabia
- Serbia
- Singapore
- Slovakia
- Slovenia
- South Africa
- South Korea
- Spain
- Sweden
- Switzerland
- Thailand
- Trinidad and Tobago
- Tunisia
- Turkey
- Ukraine
- United Kingdom
- United States
- Uzbekistan
- Venezuela
- Vietnam

== Olympic qualification ==
=== Teams ===
This event was the first qualifying stage for the 2012 Summer Olympics, which were held in London. The top 24 men's and women's teams from the 2010 World Artistic Gymnastics Championships were allowed to send a full team of gymnasts. The top 8 men's and women's teams directly qualified for the team events at the 2012 Olympics. Teams placed 9th to 16th got a second chance to qualify a full team at the Olympic Test Event on January 10–18, 2012, from which four men's and women's teams qualified.

=== Individuals ===
The winners of gold, silver and bronze medals in each apparatus qualified for the Olympics, either as individuals or as members of their national team. Additional individual gymnasts qualified from the Test Event in January.

== Competition schedule ==
All times are JST (UTC+9).

Date	Time	Round
7 October 2011	11:30	Women's team qualifying (Day 1)
8 October 2011	11:30	Women's team qualifying (Day 2)
9 October 2011	11:15	Men's team qualifying (Day 1)
10 October 2011	11:15	Men's team qualifying (Day 2)
11 October 2011	19:00	Women's team final
12 October 2011	18:00	Men's team final
13 October 2011	18:00	Women's All-around final
14 October 2011	19:00	Men's All-around final

Date	Time	Round
15 October 2011	13:30	Men's floor final
15 October 2011	13:55	Women's vault final
15 October 2011	14:45	Men's pommel horse final
15 October 2011	15:10	Women's uneven bars final
15 October 2011	15:35	Men's rings final
16 October 2011	14:00	Men's vault final
16 October 2011	14:25	Women's balance beam final
16 October 2011	15:15	Men's parallel bars final
16 October 2011	15:40	Women's floor final
16 October 2011	16:10	Men's horizontal bar final

Oldest and youngest competitors

Female	Name	Country	Date of birth	Age
Youngest	Gabby Douglas	United States	December 31, 1995	15 years
Oldest	Oksana Chusovitina	Germany	June 19, 1975	36 years

Male	Name	Country	Date of birth	Age
Youngest	Abdullah Khalid A Albuwasi	Saudi Arabia	August 10, 1995	16 years
Oldest	Yordan Yovchev	Bulgaria	February 24, 1973	38 years

== Medalists ==
Event	Gold	Silver	Bronze
Women
Team all-around	United States; Sabrina Vega; Jordyn Wieber; McKayla Maroney; Aly Raisman; Gabby Douglas; Alicia Sacramone	Russia; Ksenia Afanasyeva; Viktoria Komova; Anna Dementyeva; Yulia Belokobylskaya; Tatiana Nabieva; Yulia Inshina	China; Huang Qiushuang; Yao Jinnan; Tan Sixin; Sui Lu; Jiang Yuyuan; He Kexin
Individual all-around	Jordyn Wieber (USA)	Viktoria Komova (RUS)	Yao Jinnan (CHN)
Vault	McKayla Maroney (USA)	Oksana Chusovitina (GER)	Phan Thị Hà Thanh (VIE)
Uneven bars	Viktoria Komova (RUS)	Tatiana Nabieva (RUS)	Huang Qiushuang (CHN)
Balance beam	Sui Lu (CHN)	Yao Jinnan (CHN)	Jordyn Wieber (USA)
Floor	Ksenia Afanasyeva (RUS)	Sui Lu (CHN)	Aly Raisman (USA)
Men
Team all-around	China; Zou Kai; Teng Haibin; Chen Yibing; Zhang Chenglong; Feng Zhe; Guo Weiyang	Japan; Kōhei Uchimura; Kazuhito Tanaka; Kenya Kobayashi; Koji Yamamuro; Makoto Okiguchi; Yusuke Tanaka	United States; Jacob Dalton; Jonathan Horton; Danell Leyva; Steven Legendre; Alexander Naddour; John Orozco
Individual all-around	Kōhei Uchimura (JPN)	Philipp Boy (GER)	Koji Yamamuro (JPN)
Floor	Kōhei Uchimura (JPN)	Zou Kai (CHN)	Diego Hypólito (BRA) Alexander Shatilov (ISR)
Pommel horse	Krisztián Berki (HUN)	Cyril Tommasone (FRA)	Louis Smith (GBR)
Rings	Chen Yibing (CHN)	Arthur Zanetti (BRA)	Koji Yamamuro (JPN)
Vault	Yang Hak-Seon (KOR)	Anton Golotsutskov (RUS)	Makoto Okiguchi (JPN)
Parallel bars	Danell Leyva (USA)	Vasileios Tsolakidis (GRE) Zhang Chenglong (CHN)	none awarded
High bar	Zou Kai (CHN)	Zhang Chenglong (CHN)	Kōhei Uchimura (JPN)

== Women's results ==
=== Qualification ===
2011 World Artistic Gymnastics Championships – Women's qualification

=== Team all-around ===
In the qualifying round, 5 gymnasts performed on each apparatus, and the top 4 scores were counted towards the team's total. The top 8 teams qualified to the final.

In the final round, held on October 11, only 3 gymnasts performed on each apparatus, and all the scores counted. The United States team won the gold medal with solid performances by all gymnasts on all apparatus, while the Russian team made several mistakes and finished a distant second. China narrowly beat Romania to win the bronze medal, followed by Great Britain in fifth place. This was the highest ranking finish Great Britain had ever had for a team at a World Championship.

Oldest and youngest competitors

	Name	Country	Date of birth	Age
Youngest	Gabby Douglas	United States	31/12/95	15 years
Oldest	Oksana Chusovitina	Germany	19/06/75	36 years

Rank	Team	Vault (gymnastics)	Uneven bars	Balance beam	Floor (gymnastics)	Total
1st place, gold medalist(s)	United States	46.816 (1)	43.865 (2)	44.732 (3)	43.998 (1)	179.411
1st place, gold medalist(s)	Jordyn Wieber	15.833	14.766	15.033	14.766	179.411
1st place, gold medalist(s)	Aly Raisman	14.950	-	14.866	14.666	179.411
1st place, gold medalist(s)	McKayla Maroney	16.033	-	-	14.566	179.411
1st place, gold medalist(s)	Sabrina Vega	-	14.366	14.833	-	179.411
1st place, gold medalist(s)	Gabby Douglas	-	14.733	-	-	179.411
1st place, gold medalist(s)	Alicia Sacramone*	-	-	-	-	179.411
1st place, gold medalist(s)	Anna Li	-	-	-	-	179.411
2nd place, silver medalist(s)	Russia	44.499 (2)	44.698 (1)	43.066 (4)	43.066 (3)	175.329
2nd place, silver medalist(s)	Viktoria Komova	15.033	15.566	13.866	13.800	175.329
2nd place, silver medalist(s)	Tatiana Nabieva	14.666	14.966	-	-	175.329
2nd place, silver medalist(s)	Ksenia Afanasyeva	14.800	-	-	14.633	175.329
2nd place, silver medalist(s)	Anna Dementyeva	-	14.166	14.900	-	175.329
2nd place, silver medalist(s)	Yulia Belokobylskaya	-	-	-	14.633	175.329
2nd place, silver medalist(s)	Yulia Inshina	-	-	14.300	-	175.329
2nd place, silver medalist(s)	Alena Polyan	-	-	-	-	175.329
3rd place, bronze medalist(s)	China	43.824 (5)	43.132 (4)	44.832 (2)	41.032 (7)	172.820
3rd place, bronze medalist(s)	Yao Jinnan	14.958	14.433	15.200	14.333	172.820
3rd place, bronze medalist(s)	Tan Sixin	-	14.966	13.966	12.066	172.820
3rd place, bronze medalist(s)	Sui Lu	-	-	15.666	14.633	172.820
3rd place, bronze medalist(s)	Huang Qiushuang	14.700	13.733	-	-	172.820
3rd place, bronze medalist(s)	Jiang Yuyuan	14.166	-	-	-	172.820
3rd place, bronze medalist(s)	He Kexin	-	-	-	-	172.820
4	Romania	44.149 (4)	40.032 (8)	45.099 (1)	43.132 (2)	172.412
4	Cătălina Ponor	14.933	-	15.166	14.633	172.412
4	Ana Porgras	-	14.066	15.300	-	172.412
4	Diana Chelaru	14.566	-	-	14.233	172.412
4	Amelia Racea	-	13.000	14.633	-	172.412
4	Raluca Haidu	14.650	12.966	-	-	172.412
4	Diana Bulimar	-	-	-	14.266	172.412
5	United Kingdom	41.665 (7)	43.565 (3)	42.607 (5)	41.833 (5)	169.670
5	Hannah Whelan	13.966	13.466	14.633	13.600	169.670
5	Elizabeth Tweddle	-	15.666	-	14.533	169.670
5	Imogen Cairns	14.133	-	-	13.700	169.670
5	Danusia Francis	13.566	-	14.141	-	169.670
5	Rebecca Downie	-	14.433	-	-	169.670
5	Jennifer Pinches	-	-	13.833	-	169.670
6	Germany	44.282 (3)	42.032 (6)	40.632 (8)	41.533 (6)	168.479
6	Elisabeth Seitz	14.616	13.466	14.166	13.700	168.479
6	Nadine Jarosch	14.333	-	13.700	14.100	168.479
6	Oksana Chusovitina	15.333	-	12.766	-	168.479
6	Kim Bui	-	14.300	-	13.733	168.479
6	Lisa Katharina Hill	-	14.266	-	-	168.479
6	Pia Tolle	-	-	-	-	168.479
7	Japan	41.866 (6)	42.066 (5)	42.066 (6)	39.691 (8)	167.122
7	Asuka Teramoto	14.033	14.600	14.500	-	167.122
7	Koko Tsurumi	-	13.366	14.833	14.058	167.122
7	Rie Tanaka	14.233	14.100	-	12.533	167.122
7	Yu Minobe	-	-	14.166	-	167.122
7	Yuko Shintake	13.600	-	-	-	167.122
7	Kyoko Oshima	-	-	-	13.100	167.122
8	Australia	41.499 (8)	41.541 (7)	41.399 (7)	42.300 (4)	166.739
8	Lauren Mitchell	13.200	13.666	14.566	14.900	166.739
8	Ashleigh Brennan	13.766	-	13.900	13.700	166.739
8	Larrissa Miller	-	14.075	-	13.700	166.739
8	Emily Little	14.533	-	-	-	166.739
8	Georgia-Rose Brown	-	13.800	-	-	166.739
8	Mary-Anne Monckton	-	-	12.933	-	166.739

Controversy

During the presentation of medals, the National Anthem of the United States was abruptly ended, causing some frustration amongst both the coaches and the gymnasts themselves.

It has since been reported that right before the team competition began, McKayla Maroney from the United States, who was a member of the team who won the gold medal in the team competition and later won the individual vault title, was sexually assaulted by the former national team and Olympic team doctor Larry Nassar. Maroney has since described this incident as "the scariest night of my life" Nassar, later convicted pedophile, was on the floor next to the gymnasts for most of the world championships.

- Alicia Sacramone injured her Achilles tendon during the last podium training and had already left Japan when the Team Final started. However, US National Team Coordinator Marta Karolyi opted to keep her on the roster instead of officially naming alternate Anna Li to the team and subsequently competed with only 5 instead of the usual 6 gymnasts. This led to Sacramone receiving her tenth World Championships medal and officially becoming the US gymnast with the most World Championship medals. As Sacramone was not present during the competition, Li dressed, supported the team on the floor, and accepted the team medal for Sacramone. Li later passed the medal on to Sacramone and received (as customary for the World team alternates) a copy from USAG.

=== Individual all-around ===
The final was held on October 13. None of the medalists from the previous year were able to compete to defend their title as the gold and bronze medalists—Aliya Mustafina and Rebecca Bross, respectively—were both unable to compete at worlds due to knee injuries, and silver medalist Jiang Yuyuan did not qualify high enough over her teammates. A number of gymnasts ranked high enough to make the all-around final, but did not qualify due to the two-per-country rule. All the gymnasts from the US that competed in the preliminary round ranked in the top 24. The gymnasts affected were Gabby Douglas (5th), Sabrina Vega (9th), and McKayla Maroney (12th) of the United States. Also affected were Tan Sixin (15th) and Jiang Yuyuan (20th) of China, Yuko Shintake (21st) and Yu Minobe (23rd) of Japan, and Anna Dementyeva (31st) of Russia. The last gymnast to qualify was Carlotta Ferlito, who ranked 32nd in the preliminary competition.

Oldest and youngest competitors

	Name	Country	Date of birth	Age
Youngest	Jordyn Wieber	United States	12/07/95	16 years
Oldest	Daniele Hypólito	Brazil	08/09/84	27 years

Rank	Gymnast	Vault (gymnastics)	Uneven bars	Balance beam	Floor (gymnastics)	Total
1st place, gold medalist(s)	Jordyn Wieber (USA)	15.716	13.600	15.266	14.800	59.382
2nd place, silver medalist(s)	Viktoria Komova (RUS)	14.933	15.400	14.683	14.333	59.349
3rd place, bronze medalist(s)	Yao Jinnan (CHN)	14.966	14.933	13.933	14.766	58.598
4	Aly Raisman (USA)	15.233	12.900	14.525	14.900	57.558
5	Huang Qiushuang (CHN)	14.733	14.966	13.633	14.100	57.432
6	Ana Porgras (ROU)	14.100	14.133	15.100	13.966	57.299
7	Ksenia Afanasyeva (RUS)	14.466	14.200	13.400	14.666	56.732
8	Lauren Mitchell (AUS)	14.600	13.133	13.933	15.033	56.699
9	Hannah Whelan (GBR)	14.400	13.258	14.333	14.133	56.124
10	Nadine Jarosch (GER)	14.300	13.733	14.000	14.000	56.033
11	Elisabeth Seitz (GER)	14.758	13.933	13.366	13.766	55.823
12	Vanessa Ferrari (ITA)	12.733	13.833	14.466	14.500	55.532
13	Daniele Hypólito (BRA)	14.300	12.866	14.333	13.866	55.365
14	Carlotta Ferlito (ITA)	14.200	12.866	14.616	13.400	55.082
15	Koko Tsurumi (JPN)	13.800	12.533	14.700	13.966	54.999
16	Giulia Steingruber (SUI)	14.866	13.433	13.400	13.233	54.932
17	Céline van Gerner (NED)	13.700	13.766	13.766	13.633	54.865
18	Raluca Haidu (ROU)	13.466	13.366	14.416	13.566	54.814
19	Peng-Peng Lee (CAN)	13.933	13.900	12.933	13.966	54.732
20	Rie Tanaka (JPN)	14.233	13.833	13.933	12.700	54.699
21	Aurélie Malaussena (FRA)	14.133	13.266	13.933	13.166	54.498
22	Ana María Izurieta (ESP)	13.966	13.466	12.933	13.366	53.731
23	Emily Little (AUS)	13.633	13.300	13.566	13.100	53.599
24	Jessica López (VEN)	14.000	10.300	14.266	13.733	52.299

=== Vault ===
Phan's bronze medal was the first medal for Vietnam at a World Championships. Maroney's performance secured the third consecutive World gold medal for the USA on women's vault following Kayla Williams in 2009 and teammate Alicia Sacramone in 2010. Chusovitina's silver was her 11th world medal (her 9th vault world medal). As her first world championships was in Indianapolis in 1991, she has been competing at an international level since before her fellow vault finalists were born.

Oldest and youngest competitors

	Name	Country	Date of birth	Age
Youngest	McKayla Maroney	United States	09/12/95	15 years
Oldest	Oksana Chusovitina	Germany	19/06/75	36 years

Position	Gymnast	D Score	E Score	Pen.	Score 1	Rk	D Score	E Score	Pen.	Score 2	Rk	Total
1st place, gold medalist(s)	McKayla Maroney (USA)	6.500	9.300		15.800	(1)	5.600	9.200		14.800	(1)	15.300
2nd place, silver medalist(s)	Oksana Chusovitina (GER)	6.300	8.766		15.066	(2)	5.500	8.900		14.333	(3)	14.733
3rd place, bronze medalist(s)	Phan Thị Hà Thanh (VIE)	5.900	8.700		14.600	(6)	5.800	8.933		14.733	(2)	14.666
4	Jade Barbosa (BRA)	5.800	9.066		14.866	(4)	5.600	8.666		14.266	(4)	14.566
5	Giulia Steingruber (SUI)	6.300	8.600		14.900	(3)	5.200	8.800		14.000	(6)	14.450
6	Tatiana Nabieva (RUS)	5.800	8.766		14.566	(7)	5.200	8.933		14.133	(5)	14.349
7	Alexa Moreno (MEX)	6.300	8.433		14.733	(5)	5.200	8.500		13.700	(7)	14.216
8	Yamilet Peña (DOM)	5.300	8.600		13.900	(8)	0.000*	0.000		0.000	(8)	6.950

- Yamilet Peña attempted a handspring double front vault, which has a 7.1 D Value score, but because she landed on her back, she scored a 0.000.

=== Uneven bars ===
Oldest and youngest competitors

	Name	Country	Date of birth	Age
Youngest	Gabby Douglas	United States	31/12/95	15 years
Oldest	Huang Qiushuang	China	28/05/92	19 years

Position	Gymnast	D Score	E Score	Pen.	Qual Rk	Total
1st place, gold medalist(s)	Viktoria Komova (RUS)	6.700	8.800		(1)	15.500
2nd place, silver medalist(s)	Tatiana Nabieva (RUS)	6.600	8.400		(5)	15.000
3rd place, bronze medalist(s)	Huang Qiushuang (CHN)	6.700	8.133		(4)	14.833
4	Jordyn Wieber (USA)	6.300	8.200		(7)	14.500
5	Gabby Douglas (USA)	6.300	7.900		(6)	14.200
5	Asuka Teramoto (JPN)	6.300	7.900		(8)	14.200
7	Koko Tsurumi (JPN)	6.400	7.666		(3)	14.066
8	Youna Dufournet (FRA)	6.300	6.341		(2)	12.641

=== Balance beam ===
Oldest and youngest competitors

	Name	Country	Date of birth	Age
Youngest	Jordyn Wieber	United States	12/07/95	16 years
Oldest	Cătălina Ponor	Romania	20/08/87	24 years

Position	Gymnast	D Score	E Score	Pen.	Qual Rk	Total
1st place, gold medalist(s)	Sui Lu (CHN)	6.600	9.266		(2)	15.866
2nd place, silver medalist(s)	Yao Jinnan (CHN)	6.300	8.933		(4)	15.233
3rd place, bronze medalist(s)	Jordyn Wieber (USA)	6.200	8.933		(3)	15.133
4	Aly Raisman (USA)	6.400	8.666		(6)	15.066
5	Amelia Racea (ROU)	5.900	8.633		(7)	14.533
6	Yulia Inshina (RUS)	5.700	8.825		(8)	14.525
7	Cătălina Ponor (ROU)	5.700	8.541		(5)	14.241
8	Viktoria Komova (RUS)	5.900	7.866		(1)	13.766

=== Floor ===
Oldest and youngest competitors

	Name	Country	Date of birth	Age
Youngest	Jordyn Wieber	United States	12/07/95	16 years
Oldest	Elizabeth Tweddle	United Kingdom	01/04/85	26 years

On the day before the competition, it was announced that Diana Bulimar injured her foot, and first reserve Lauren Mitchell would take her place in the final. Shortly after the women's beam competition, it was announced that Russia decided to pull Viktoria Komova from the competition to give her teammate (and second reserve) Ksenia Afanasyeva a chance to compete in the final instead. During warm up Vanessa Ferrari injured herself; so, third reserve Diana Chelaru was quickly added to replace her.

Position	Gymnast	D Score	E Score	Pen.	Qual Rk	Total
1st place, gold medalist(s)	Ksenia Afanasyeva (RUS)	6.100	9.033		(10)	15.133
2nd place, silver medalist(s)	Sui Lu (CHN)	6.100	8.966		(2)	15.066
3rd place, bronze medalist(s)	Aly Raisman (USA)	6.100	8.900		(1)	15.000
4	Yao Jinnan (CHN)	6.000	8.866		(4)	14.866
5	Lauren Mitchell (AUS)	6.300	8.433		(9)	14.733
6	Jordyn Wieber (USA)	6.000	8.700		(3)	14.700
7	Elizabeth Tweddle (GBR)	6.100	8.500	0.100	(7)	14.500
8	Diana Chelaru (ROU)	5.800	8.400		(11)	14.200

== Men's results ==
=== Team all-around ===
In the qualifying round, 5 gymnasts performed on each apparatus, and the top 4 scores counted towards the team's total. The top 8 teams qualified for the final.

In the final round, held on October 12, only 3 gymnasts performed on each apparatus, and all the scores were counted. The Chinese team won the title for the fifth successive time, benefiting from crucial mistakes by the last 2 Japanese gymnasts. Japan was still able to win the silver medal, with a margin of only 0.010 point from the United States in bronze medal position.

Oldest and youngest competitors

	Name	Country	Date of birth	Age
Youngest	Oleg Stepko	Ukraine	25/04/94	17 years
Oldest	Roman Zozulya	Ukraine	22/06/79	32 years

Rank	Team	Floor (gymnastics)	Pommel horse	Rings (gymnastics)	Vault (gymnastics)	Parallel bars	Horizontal bar	Total
1st place, gold medalist(s)	China	45.566	43.999	44.732	48.199	45.432	47.233	275.161
1st place, gold medalist(s)	Zou Kai	15.600	-	-	15.566	-	15.933	275.161
1st place, gold medalist(s)	Teng Haibin	-	15.233	14.300	-	14.166	15.100	275.161
1st place, gold medalist(s)	Chen Yibing	-	14.000	15.466	-	-	-	275.161
1st place, gold medalist(s)	Zhang Chenglong	15.400	-	-	16.333	15.600	16.200	275.161
1st place, gold medalist(s)	Feng Zhe	14.566	-	-	16.300	15.666	-	275.161
1st place, gold medalist(s)	Guo Weiyang	-	14.766	14.966	-	-	-	275.161
2nd place, silver medalist(s)	Japan	45.265	43.523	45.299	48.700	46.199	44.107	273.093
2nd place, silver medalist(s)	Kōhei Uchimura	15.466	14.991	15.000	16.200	15.366	14.700	273.093
2nd place, silver medalist(s)	Kazuhito Tanaka	-	-	-	-	15.500	15.141	273.093
2nd place, silver medalist(s)	Kenya Kobayashi	-	14.066	14.933	-	-	-	273.093
2nd place, silver medalist(s)	Koji Yamamuro	14.633	14.466	15.366	16.400	-	-	273.093
2nd place, silver medalist(s)	Makoto Okiguchi	15.166	-	-	16.100	-	-	273.093
2nd place, silver medalist(s)	Yusuke Tanaka	-	-	-	-	15.333	14.266	273.093
3rd place, bronze medalist(s)	United States	46.032	43.857	43.565	47.765	45.599	46.265	273.083
3rd place, bronze medalist(s)	Jacob Dalton	15.500	-	14.333	16.333	-	-	273.083
3rd place, bronze medalist(s)	Jonathan Horton	14.966	-	15.066	15.266	15.000	15.366	273.083
3rd place, bronze medalist(s)	Danell Leyva	-	14.366	-	-	15.366	15.533	273.083
3rd place, bronze medalist(s)	Steven Legendre	15.566	-	-	16.166	-	-	273.083
3rd place, bronze medalist(s)	Alexander Naddour	-	15.058	-	-	-	-	273.083
3rd place, bronze medalist(s)	John Orozco	-	14.433	14.166	-	15.233	15.366	273.083
4	Russia	44.366	41.966	44.999	48.357	44.491	44.866	269.045
4	Konstantin Pluzhnikov	-	-	15.466	-	-	-	269.045
4	Emin Garibov	-	14.133	-	-	14.525	15.466	269.045
4	Sergei Khorokhordin	-	13.233	14.533	-	14.700	14.800	269.045
4	David Belyavskiy	14.433	14.600	-	15.833	15.266	14.600	269.045
4	Denis Ablyazin	15.033	-	15.000	16.266	-	-	269.045
4	Anton Golotsutskov	14.600	-	-	16.258	-	-	269.045
5	Ukraine	43.857	42.565	43.966	46.882	42.266	44.566	264.102
5	Mykola Kuksenkov	14.633	-	14.400	-	-	15.133	264.102
5	Vitaly Nakonechny	-	14.366	-	-	13.966	14.800	264.102
5	Oleg Stepko	14.733	14.433	-	15.833	14.500	-	264.102
5	Igor Radivilov	-	-	14.933	16.166	-	-	264.102
5	Roman Zozulya	-	-	14.633	-	-	14.633	264.102
5	Oleg Verniaiev	14.461	13.866	-	14.833	13.800	-	264.102
6	Germany	44.399	40.465	43.399	46.699	43.199	45.765	263.926
6	Philipp Boy	14.833	13.166	-	14.966	14.600	15.433	263.926
6	Marcel Nguyen	14.833	-	14.666	16.033	13.366	14.466	263.926
6	Fabian Hambüchen	14.733	-	14.433	15.700	15.233	15.866	263.926
6	Sebastian Krimmer	-	13.566	-	-	-	-	263.926
6	Eugen Spiridonov	-	13.733	-	-	-	-	263.926
6	Thomas Taranu	-	-	14.300	-	-	-	263.926
7	South Korea	41.932	41.966	42.465	48.333	43.332	42.365	260.393
7	Ha Chang-Ju	-	13.600	-	15.600	14.566	-	260.393
7	Choi Jin-Sung	12.600	-	14.566	-	-	-	260.393
7	Kim Seung-Il	-	-	14.033	-	14.600	14.666	260.393
7	Kim Soo-Myun	14.766	14.166	-	15.900	14.166	13.566	260.393
7	Kim Ji-Hoon	-	14.200	-	-	-	14.133	260.393
7	Yang Hak-Seon	14.566	-	13.866	16.833	-	-	260.393
8	Romania	42.132	41.940	42.465	31.066	43.665	42.541	245.175
8	Flavius Koczi	15.233	14.708	-	15.600	14.566	-	245.175
8	Cristian Bățagă	-	14.166	14.533	15.466	-	-	245.175
8	Vlad Cotuna	13.266	-	14.266	-	-	14.400	245.175
8	Marius Berbecar	-	-	-	0.000*	15.533	13.908	245.175
8	Ovidiu Buidoso	13.633	14.066	13.666	-	13.466	14.223	245.175

- Berbecar landed on his back, therefore scored a 0.000.

=== Individual all-around ===
The all-around final was held on October 14. Three gymnasts had ranked high enough to qualify, but were not allowed to compete due to the two-per-country rule. The affected gymnasts were Jonathan Horton (5th), Fabian Hambüchen (19th) and Steven Legendre (24th). On the day of the final, Marian Drăgulescu pulled out of the competition and Nathan Gafuik took his place. Kōhei Uchimura's gold-medal-winning-margin was 3.101 points over runner-up Philipp Boy, who defended his silver medal from 2010 as well.

Oldest and youngest competitors

	Name	Country	Date of birth	Age
Youngest	Oleg Stepko	Ukraine	25/04/94	17 years
Oldest	Anton Fokin	Uzbekistan	13/11/82	28 years

Rank	Gymnast	Floor (gymnastics)	Pommel horse	Rings (gymnastics)	Vault (gymnastics)	Parallel bars	Horizontal bar	Total
1st place, gold medalist(s)	Kōhei Uchimura (JPN)	15.566	15.400	15.166	16.233	15.566	15.700	93.631
2nd place, silver medalist(s)	Philipp Boy (GER)	14.866	14.466	14.500	16.066	14.566	16.066	90.530
3rd place, bronze medalist(s)	Koji Yamamuro (JPN)	14.566	14.666	15.125	16.066	14.966	14.866	90.255
4	Daniel Purvis (GBR)	15.033	14.566	14.333	16.000	15.200	14.800	89.932
5	John Orozco (USA)	14.400	14.366	14.300	15.866	15.366	15.366	89.664
6	David Belyavskiy (RUS)	14.733	14.733	14.375	16.233	14.600	14.600	89.274
7	Mykola Kuksenkov (UKR)	14.366	15.000	14.500	16.033	14.033	15.200	89.132
8	Marcel Nguyen (GER)	15.233	13.866	14.933	15.133	15.200	14.466	88.831
9	Cyril Tommasone (FRA)	14.333	15.400	13.966	15.600	14.600	14.666	88.565
10	Rafael Martínez (ESP)	14.633	13.833	13.891	16.100	14.466	15.166	88.089
10	Kim Seung-Il (KOR)	14.466	14.466	14.291	15.600	14.433	14.833	88.089
12	Flavius Koczi (ROU)	15.366	14.333	13.633	16.433	14.433	13.800	87.998
13	Alexander Shatilov (ISR)	15.300	14.300	13.900	15.400	14.200	14.333	87.433
14	Anton Fokin (UZB)	14.066	14.566	14.233	15.700	14.966	13.833	87.364
15	Emin Garibov (RUS)	14.433	13.566	14.408	15.500	13.966	15.458	87.331
16	Andrei Likhovitsky (BLR)	14.266	14.966	13.700	15.300	14.600	14.333	87.165
17	Kim Soo-Myun (KOR)	14.466	14.866	13.866	16.366	14.100	13.500	87.164
18	Teng Haibin (CHN)	14.266	15.066	13.600	15.633	15.233	13.233	87.031
19	Oleg Stepko (UKR)	14.633	14.033	14.033	15.766	14.233	13.566	86.264
20	Pascal Bucher (SUI)	13.800	13.066	13.566	15.333	14.933	14.333	85.031
21	Javier Gomez (ESP)	14.066	13.500	14.300	14.800	14.475	13.766	84.907
22	Tomás González (CHI)	15.333	12.100	13.866	16.000	13.300	13.766	84.365
23	Nathan Gafuik (CAN)	13.633	12.900	13.566	15.833	12.533	14.233	82.698
24	Danell Leyva (USA)	14.833	14.433	14.341	14.800	15.333	6.466	80.206

=== Floor ===
The final for Men's Floor Exercise took place on October 15. Marian Drăgulescu had qualified in 2nd, but pulled out of the competition on the morning of the final. As the first reserve, Jake Dalton (USA) took his place. There was also an inquiry made by the Japanese coaches into the scoring when Kōhei Uchimura's difficulty score was only awarded a 6.500 because they had mistaken a triple twisting move for a double twisting move. The inquiry was accepted by the judges, and the score adjusted accordingly, which gave Uchimura the gold medal.

Oldest and youngest competitors

	Name	Country	Date of birth	Age
Youngest	Jacob Dalton	United States	19/08/91	20 years
Oldest	Tomás González	Chile	22/11/85	25 years

Rank	Gymnast	D Score	E Score	Pen.	Total
1st place, gold medalist(s)	Kōhei Uchimura (JPN)	6.700	8.933		15.633
2nd place, silver medalist(s)	Zou Kai (CHN)	6.900	8.600		15.500
3rd place, bronze medalist(s)	Diego Hypólito (BRA)	6.800	8.666		15.466
3rd place, bronze medalist(s)	Alexander Shatilov (ISR)	6.700	8.766		15.466
5	Steven Legendre (USA)	6.800	8.600		15.400
6	Flavius Koczi (ROU)	6.700	8.633		15.333
6	Tomás González (CHI)	6.500	8.833		15.333
8	Jacob Dalton (USA)	6.600	8.633	0.1	15.133

=== Pommel horse ===
Oldest and youngest competitors

	Name	Country	Date of birth	Age
Youngest	Louis Smith	United Kingdom	22/04/89	22 years
Oldest	Sašo Bertoncelj	Slovenia	16/07/84	27 years

Rank	Gymnast	D Score	E Score	Pen.	Total
1st place, gold medalist(s)	Krisztián Berki (HUN)	6.700	9.133		15.833
2nd place, silver medalist(s)	Cyril Tommasone (FRA)	6.500	8.766		15.266
3rd place, bronze medalist(s)	Louis Smith (GBR)	7.000	8.066		15.066
4	Vid Hidvégi (HUN)	6.400	8.600		15.000
5	Kōhei Uchimura (JPN)	6.700	7.833		14.533
6	Prashanth Sellathurai (AUS)	6.600	7.733		14.333
7	Sašo Bertoncelj (SLO)	6.500	7.766		14.266
7	Teng Haibin (CHN)	6.600	7.666		14.266

=== Rings ===
Oldest and youngest competitors

	Name	Country	Date of birth	Age
Youngest	Arthur Nabarrete Zanetti	Brazil	16/04/90	21 years
Oldest	Regulo Carmona	Venezuela	31/01/80	31 years

Rank	Gymnast	D Score	E Score	Pen.	Total
1st place, gold medalist(s)	Chen Yibing (CHN)	6.800	9.000		15.800
2nd place, silver medalist(s)	Arthur Nabarrete Zanetti (BRA)	6.500	9.100		15.600
3rd place, bronze medalist(s)	Koji Yamamuro (JPN)	6.700	8.800		15.500
4	Matteo Morandi (ITA)	6.800	8.400		15.200
5	Yuri van Gelder (NED)	6.800	7.866		14.666
6	Kōhei Uchimura (JPN)	6.400	8.233		14.633
7	Jonathan Horton (USA)	6.100	8.200		14.300
8	Regulo Carmona (VEN)	6.700	7.566		14.266

=== Vault ===
Originally, Marian Drăgulescu was to compete in this final, but had to pull out of competition due to an injury. Denis Ablyazin replaced him in the final as the first reserve.

Oldest and youngest competitors

	Name	Country	Date of birth	Age
Youngest	Yang Hak-Seon	South Korea	06/12/92	18 years
Oldest	Dzmitry Kaspiarovich	Belarus	15/10/77	34 years

Position	Gymnast	D Score	E Score	Penalty	Score 1	D Score	E Score	Penalty	Score 2	Total
1st place, gold medalist(s)	Yang Hak-Seon (KOR)	7.400	9.466		16.866	7.000	9.366	0.1	16.266	16.566
2nd place, silver medalist(s)	Anton Golotsutskov (RUS)	7.000	9.333		16.333	7.000	9.400		16.400	16.366
3rd place, bronze medalist(s)	Makoto Okiguchi (JPN)	7.000	9.400	0.1	16.300	7.000	9.283		16.283	16.291
4	Thomas Bouhail (FRA)	7.000	9.666		16.666	7.000	8.808	0.1	15.708	16.187
5	Denis Ablyazin (RUS)	7.000	9.333		16.333	7.200	8.916	0.1	16.016	16.174
6	Dzmitry Kaspiarovich (BLR)	7.000	9.333		16.533	7.000	8.733	0.1	15.633	16.083
7	Shek Wai Hung (HKG)	6.600	9.000		15.600	7.000	9.300		16.300	15.950
8	Jeffrey Wammes (NED)	6.800	8.633		15.433	6.600	9.333		15.933	15.683

=== Parallel bars ===
Oldest and youngest competitors

	Name	Country	Date of birth	Age
Youngest	Danell Leyva	United States	30/10/91	19 years
Oldest	Vasileios Tsolakidis	Greece	09/09/79	32 years

Rank	Gymnast	D Score	E Score	Pen.	Total
1st place, gold medalist(s)	Danell Leyva (USA)	6.400	9.233		15.633
2nd place, silver medalist(s)	Vasileios Tsolakidis (GRE)	6.500	9.033		15.533
2nd place, silver medalist(s)	Zhang Chenglong (CHN)	6.500	9.033		15.533
4	Kōhei Uchimura (JPN)	6.500	9.000		15.500
5	Yann Cucherat (FRA)	6.400	8.933		15.333
6	Marius Berbecar (ROU)	6.600	8.666		15.266
7	Feng Zhe (CHN)	6.600	8.600		15.200
8	Kazuhito Tanaka (JPN)	6.800	8.366		15.166

=== Horizontal bar ===
Oldest and youngest competitors

	Name	Country	Date of birth	Age
Youngest	John Orozco	United States	30/12/92	18 years
Oldest	Epke Zonderland	Netherlands	16/04/86	25 years

Rank	Gymnast	D score	E score	Pen.	Total
1st place, gold medalist(s)	Zou Kai (CHN)	7.700	8.741		16.441
2nd place, silver medalist(s)	Zhang Chenglong (CHN)	7.600	8.766		16.366
3rd place, bronze medalist(s)	Kōhei Uchimura (JPN)	7.300	9.033		16.333
4	Fabian Hambüchen (GER)	7.500	8.733		16.233
5	Epke Zonderland (NED)	7.400	7.433		14.833
6	Yusuke Tanaka (JPN)	7.000	7.700		14.700
7	Philipp Boy (GER)	7.000	7.300		14.300
8	John Orozco (USA)	5.900	8.233		14.133

== Medal table ==
=== Overall ===
Rank	Nation	Gold	Silver	Bronze	Total
1	China	4	5	3	12
2	United States	4	0	3	7
3	Russia	2	4	0	6
4	Japan	2	1	4	7
5	Hungary	1	0	0	1
5	South Korea	1	0	0	1
7	Germany	0	2	0	2
8	Brazil	0	1	1	2
9	France	0	1	0	1
9	Greece	0	1	0	1
11	Great Britain	0	0	1	1
11	Israel	0	0	1	1
11	Vietnam	0	0	1	1
Totals (13 entries)		14	15	14	43

=== Men ===
Rank	Nation	Gold	Silver	Bronze	Total
1	China	3	3	0	6
2	Japan	2	1	4	7
3	United States	1	0	1	2
4	Hungary	1	0	0	1
4	South Korea	1	0	0	1
6	Brazil	0	1	1	2
7	France	0	1	0	1
7	Germany	0	1	0	1
7	Greece	0	1	0	1
7	Russia	0	1	0	1
11	Great Britain	0	0	1	1
11	Israel	0	0	1	1
Totals (12 entries)		8	9	8	25

=== Women ===
Rank	Nation	Gold	Silver	Bronze	Total
1	United States	3	0	2	5
2	Russia	2	3	0	5
3	China	1	2	3	6
4	Germany	0	1	0	1
5	Vietnam	0	0	1	1
Totals (5 entries)		6	6	6	18
