= Carlotta Ferlito =

Italian artistic gymnast

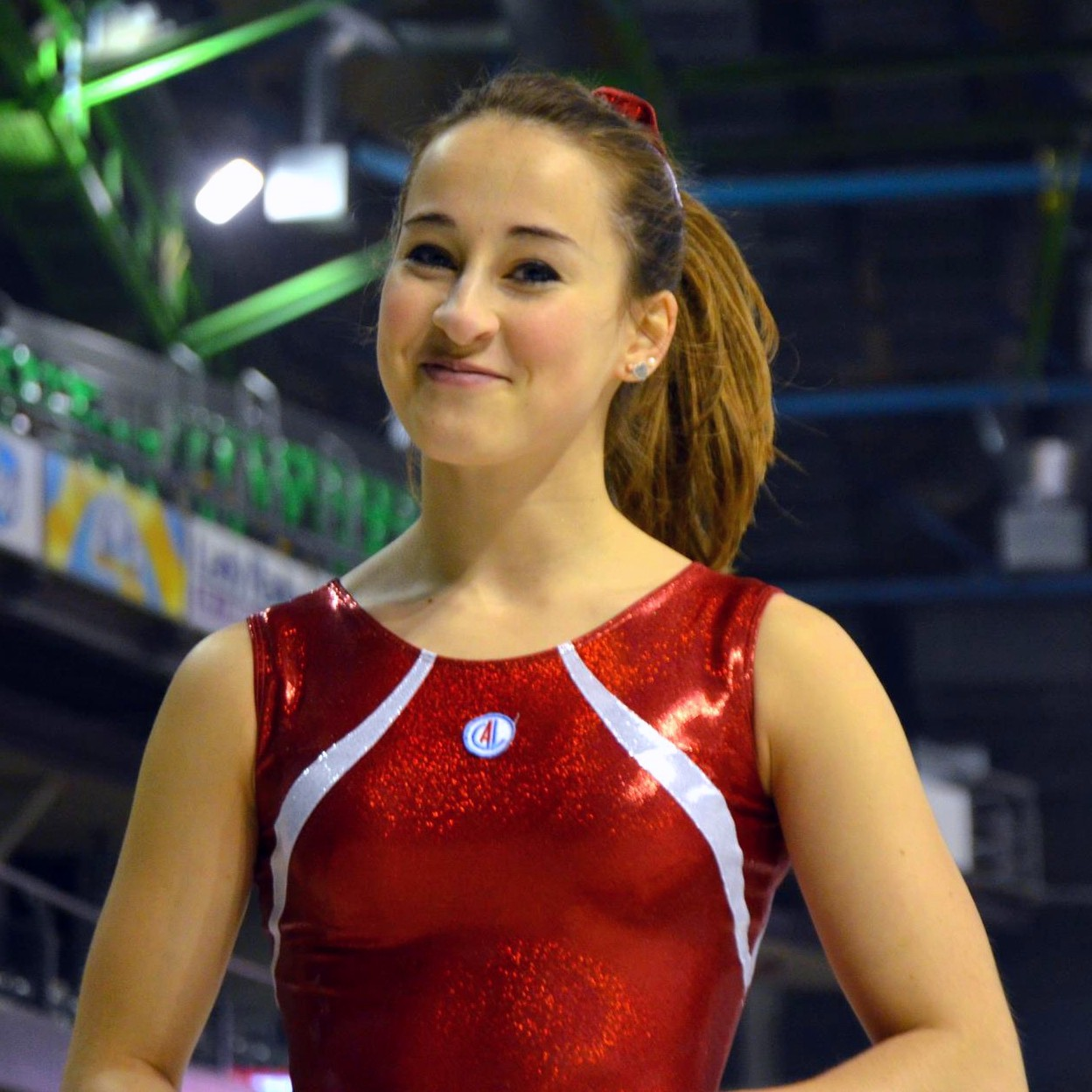
- Ferlito in 2013

Personal information
- Full name: Carlotta Ferlito
- Born: 15 February 1995 (age 31) Catania, Italy
- Height: 157 cm (5 ft 2 in)

Gymnastics career
- Discipline: Women's artistic gymnastics
- Country represented: Italy; (2008–present (ITA))
- Club: Centro Sportivo Esercito
- Head coaches: Claudia Ferré, Paolo Bucci
- Choreographer: Tiziana Dipilato
Medal record
Representing Italy
European Championships
Silver medal – second place	2011 Berlin	Balance Beam
Bronze medal – third place	2012 Brussels	Team
Summer Universiade
Gold medal – first place	2019 Naples	Floor Exercise
Bronze medal – third place	2019 Naples	Team
Youth Olympic Games
Silver medal – second place	2010 Singapore	Balance Beam
Bronze medal – third place	2010 Singapore	All-Around
Bronze medal – third place	2010 Singapore	Vault

Carlotta Ferlito (born 15 February 1995) is an Italian artistic gymnast. Since starting her senior career in 2011, Ferlito has won two medals at the European Championships and represented her country at the 2012 and 2016 Summer Olympics. She is the first Italian gymnast to have competed the "Mustafina" on floor (triple turn with the leg held up in split, Difficulty E).

== Personal life ==
Ferlito was born on 15 February 1995 in Catania, Sicily, to Roberta Parasilti and Massimo Ferlito. She has an older brother, Gianpaolo, and an older sister, Ludovica.

== Gymnastics career ==
She began gymnastics when she was six years old. In 2007, she moved to Lissone, near Milan, to train at GAL Lissone.

=== Junior career ===
==== 2009 ====
In March 2009, Ferlito competed at the annual City of Jesolo Trophy in Jesolo, Italy, for the first time. She placed second in the all-around with a total score of 54.850.

In December, she placed sixth in the all-around at the Gymnasiade in Doha, Qatar, with a score of 53.950. In event finals, she placed fifth on vault, scoring 13.212; second on balance beam, scoring 14.175; and fifth on floor, scoring 13.675.

==== 2010 ====
In March, Ferlito placed tenth in the all-around at the City of Jesolo Trophy with a score of 54.500. The following month, she competed at the 2010 European Women's Artistic Gymnastics Championships in Birmingham, where she contributed an all-around score of 53.725 toward the Italian team's third-place finish. Individually, she placed eighth in the all-around final (52.200) and eighth on balance beam (12.500).

At the Youth Olympic Games in Singapore in August, Ferlito placed third in the all-around final with a score of 55.350. In event finals, she placed third on vault (13.700), sixth on uneven bars (12.725), second on balance beam (14.850), and eighth on floor (12.900).

=== Senior career ===
==== 2011 ====
At her third City of Jesolo Trophy, and first as a senior, Ferlito placed fifth in the all-around competition with a score of 55.600. She also placed fifth at the 2011 European Championships in Berlin, with a score of 55.825. In event finals at the European Championships, she placed second on balance beam (14.500) and sixth on floor (14.050).

In May, at the Italian Championships in Meda, Ferlito placed second in the all-around with a score of 56.350. She also placed second on vault (13.750), sixth on uneven bars (11.800), first on balance beam (14.800), and first on floor (14.400).

In October, Ferlito competed in Tokyo at her first World Championships. She scored 54.332 in the team competition, in which Italy finished ninth, just missing the cut for guaranteed qualification to the 2012 Summer Olympics. In the all-around final, she placed fourteenth with a score of 55.082.

==== 2012 ====
In January, Ferlito competed at the London Prepares series, Italy's last chance to qualify a full team to the Olympics. She scored 14.066 on vault, 13.433 on uneven bars, 14.533 on balance beam, and 14.100 on floor, and the Italian team finished first, successfully qualifying. In event finals, Ferlito placed first on balance beam (14.500) and fifth on floor (13.966).

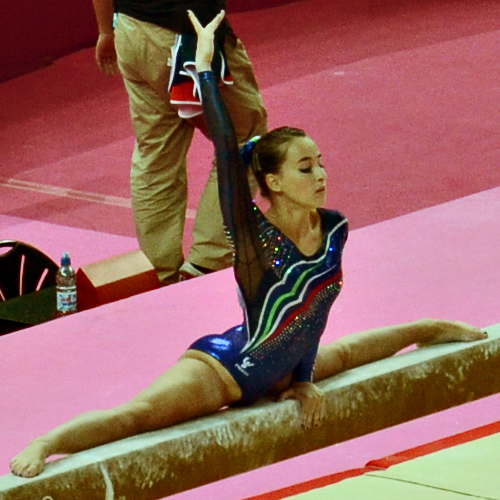
Ferlito performing on balance beam at the London Olympics on 29 July 2012

In March, Ferlito placed eighth at the City of Jesolo Trophy with a score of 56.550. Her club, GAL Lissone, also won the Serie A1 Scudetto for the second consecutive year.

At the 2012 European Championships in Brussels in May, she contributed scores of 14.166 on vault, 14.900 on balance beam, and 13.900 on floor toward the Italian team's third-place finish. The following month, at the Italian Championships in Catania, she placed second in the all-around (55.950), fourth on uneven bars (13.500), first on balance beam (14.900), and fourth on floor (13.200).

At the end of July, Ferlito competed at the 2012 Summer Olympics in London. In qualifications, she placed 20th with a score of 55.500 and qualified to the all around final, where she finished 21st with a score of 55.098. In the team final, she contributed scores of 14.300 on vault, 14.366 on balance beam, and 14.100 on floor toward the Italian team's seventh-place finish.

==== 2013–14 ====
Ferlito performing on balance beam at the 2013 World Artistic Gymnastics Championships in Antwerp on 6 October 2013

At the 2013 European Championships in Moscow in April, Ferlito finished fourth in the balance beam final (14.066) and fifth in the floor exercise final (14.216).

In October, she competed at the 2013 World Championships in Antwerp. She placed 14th in the all-around in qualifications (54.948) and 11th in the all-around final (55.399). In the beam final, she finished fifth with a score of 14.283.

At the 2014 American Cup, Ferlito finished eighth with an all-around score of 53.632. She was sick with mononucleosis for most of the rest of the year, and spent several months recovering from injuries and illness.

==== 2015 ====
In March, Ferlito competed at the City of Jesolo Trophy and qualified for beam finals, where she won bronze. At the European Championships in April, she scored 13.866 on vault, 13.000 on bars, 14.058 on beam, and 13.400 on floor, placing 13th in the all-around qualifications, but she did not make the all-around final because only two gymnasts per country could do so. She also finished 10th on beam, missing the event final by about a tenth of a point.

After several successful competitions, Ferlito was chosen to participate in the 2015 World Championships. She qualified to the all-around final in 16th place with a total score of 55.665, and the Italian team qualified for the 2016 Summer Olympics in seventh place. On beam, with a score of 14.233 (difficulty: 5.7; execution: 8.533), Ferlito tied with Eythora Thorsdottir of the Netherlands (D-Score: 5.6, E-Score: 8.633). However, because Thorsdottir had the higher execution score, she earned the last place in the beam final over Ferlito. In the all-around final, Ferlito scored 14.441 on beam, the third-best score in that final (after Larisa Iordache's 14.766 and Shang Chunsong's 14.700). She finished in 12th place.

==== 2016 ====
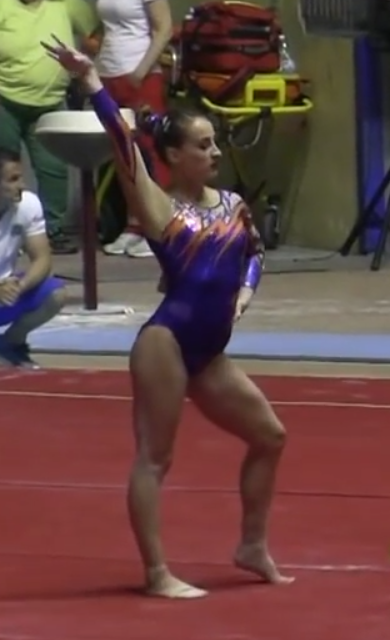
Ferlito at the 2016 Italian Championships in Turin

Ferlito was the only Italian competitor at the 2016 American Cup in Newark, where she finished fifth.

At the 2016 City of Jesolo Trophy on 20 March, Ferlito fell on her head when her foot slipped off the end of the beam as she dismounted. She was taken to a hospital in Portogruaro, but scans revealed no spinal damage or other serious injuries.

At the Olympics in Rio de Janeiro, Ferlito placed 27th in qualifications with a total score of 55.599, and twelfth in the all-around final with a score of 56.598. The Italian team finished tenth in qualifications and did not qualify for the team final.

==== 2019 ====
Ferlito won the gold medal on floor and bronze in the team event at the 2019 Summer Universiade.

== Competitive history ==
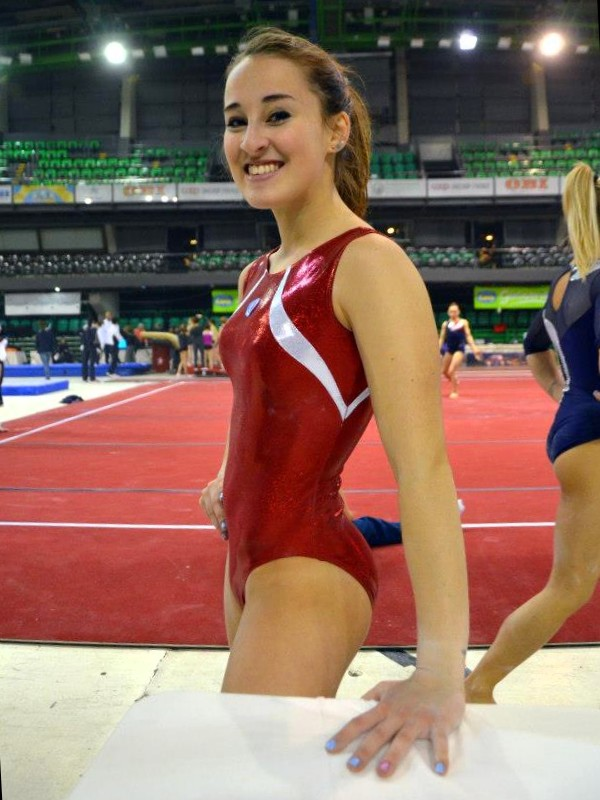
Ferlito in 2013

Year	Event	Team	AA	VT	UB	BB	FX
Junior
2005	Italian National Championships		2nd place, silver medalist(s)			1st place, gold medalist(s)	
2006	Italian National Championships		1st place, gold medalist(s)				
2008	Italy-Switzerland Friendly	1st place, gold medalist(s)	2nd place, silver medalist(s)				
2008	Leverkusen Cup	2nd place, silver medalist(s)	6				
2009	Italian National Championships			3rd place, bronze medalist(s)		4	3rd place, bronze medalist(s)
2009	Gymnasiade	2nd place, silver medalist(s)	6	5		2nd place, silver medalist(s)	5
2010	Italian National Championships		3rd place, bronze medalist(s)	1st place, gold medalist(s)		2nd place, silver medalist(s)	5
2010	European Championships	3rd place, bronze medalist(s)	8			8	
2010	Youth Olympic Games		3rd place, bronze medalist(s)	3rd place, bronze medalist(s)	6	2nd place, silver medalist(s)	8
Senior
2011	A1 Championships	1st place, gold medalist(s)	2nd place, silver medalist(s)				
2011	City of Jesolo Trophy	2nd place, silver medalist(s)	5				
2011	European Championships		5			2nd place, silver medalist(s)	6
2011	Italian National Championships		2nd place, silver medalist(s)	2nd place, silver medalist(s)	8	1st place, gold medalist(s)	1st place, gold medalist(s)
2011	World Championships	9	14				
2012	Olympic Test Event	1st place, gold medalist(s)				1st place, gold medalist(s)	5
2012	First A1 Championships	3rd place, bronze medalist(s)	1st place, gold medalist(s)			1st place, gold medalist(s)	
2012	Second A1 Championships	1st place, gold medalist(s)	2nd place, silver medalist(s)				
2012	City of Jesolo Trophy	2nd place, silver medalist(s)	8				
2012	Third A1 Championships		1st place, gold medalist(s)				
2012	European Championships	3rd place, bronze medalist(s)					
2012	Italian National Championships		(silver) |		1st place, gold medalist(s)	4	
2012	Olympic Games	7	21				
2013	La Roche-sur-Yon World Cup					1st place, gold medalist(s)	3rd place, bronze medalist(s)
2013	European Championships					4	5
2013	Germany-Italy Friendly	1st place, gold medalist(s)	2nd place, silver medalist(s)				
2013	World Championships	—N/a	11			5	
2013	Stuttgart World Cup		6				
2013	Glasgow World Cup		6				
2014	American Cup		8				
2014	Golden League	2nd place, silver medalist(s)				4	
2015	City of Jesolo Trophy	2nd place, silver medalist(s)	14			3rd place, bronze medalist(s)	
2015	Italian National Championships		6			1st place, gold medalist(s)	3rd place, bronze medalist(s)
2015	World Championships	7	12				
2016	American Cup		5				
2016	City of Jesolo Trophy	3rd place, bronze medalist(s)	8			8	
2016	Italian National Championships		2nd place, silver medalist(s)			1st place, gold medalist(s)	
2016	Olympic Games		12				
2017	Italian National Championships						7
2019	Summer Universiade	3rd place, bronze medalist(s)				5	1st place, gold medalist(s)

== Television ==
From 2011 to 2013, Ferlito was a star of the reality television series Gymnasts: Parallel Lives on MTV Italy, which follows the lives of different elite gymnasts who train in Milan.

In 2018, Ferlito participated in the second season of the Italian version of the talent show Dance Dance Dance, aired on Fox Life. She was paired with Frank Chamizo. They were the fourth pair to be eliminated.

== Controversies ==
After American gymnast Simone Biles, who is African-American, won the bronze medal on balance beam at the 2013 World Championships, Ferlito said in a video interview that she had told Italian teammate Vanessa Ferrari "that next time we should also paint our skin black, so then we can win, too." Ferlito later apologized on Twitter.

Two years later, at the 2015 European Championships, Ferlito was excluded from the all-around final because of the two-per-country rule and narrowly missed the beam final. Afterward, she posted on Twitter in Italian, "I am used to being a few tenths out and taking it in the ass. I will overcome these assholes." She later deleted the tweet and apologized in another tweet, writing, "Under stress, I do the worst of myself. I apologize, I did not want to cause offense and I'm sorry to have been misunderstood. Good luck to all."

== Floor music ==
Year	Music Title
2008	"Singapore"
2009	"The Hunt"
2010	"Standing in Motion"
2011	"Flamenko"
2012	"Fiesta Loca"
2013	"Moon Trance"
2013–2014	"Americano"
2015	"Timber"
