= Angela Donald =

Australian artistic gymnast

Angela D

Gymnastics career
- Discipline: Women's artistic gymnastics
- Country represented: Australia
- Club: Waverley/VIS
- Head coach: John Hart
- Assistant coach: Shao Yi Jiang
Medal record
Youth Olympic Games
Bronze medal – third place	2010 Singapore	Beam

Angela D is an Australian artistic gymnast and is the 2010 Bronze Medal Winner for the Beam at the Youth Olympic Games in Singapore.

Angela began her gymnastics career at age 9. She says that her favorite memory in gymnastics is "Hearing the head coach call my name for the Australian Team to compete for Germany." Her tips on how to become a top athlete; "Work Hard and never lose sight of your goals and dreams." She cites Nastia Liukin, Georgia Bonora, Shona Morgan and Emma Dennis as her influences.

== Career ==
=== 2010s ===
Angela competed at the 2010 Youth Olympics in Singapore where she won the bronze medal in the Beam Competition, coming behind China's Tan Sixin and Italy's Carlotta Ferlito.

She was also a contender training for the 2012 Olympics team.
