= Konstantin Pluzhnikov (gymnast) =

Russian artistic gymnast

- Full name: Konstantin Sergeyevich Pluzhnikov
- Born: 28 April 1987 (age 39) Seversk

Gymnastics career
- Discipline: Men's artistic gymnastics
- Country represented: Russia
Medal record
Men's artistic gymnastics
Representing Russia
European Championships
Gold medal – first place	2011 Berlin	Rings

Konstantin Sergeyevich Pluzhnikov (Russian: Константин Серге́евич Плужников, born 28 April 1987 in Seversk) is a Russian gymnast. He is the 2011 European Champion on rings.

== See also ==
- List of Olympic male artistic gymnasts for Russia
