= Viktoria Komova =

Russian artistic gymnast (born 1995)

- Виктория Комова
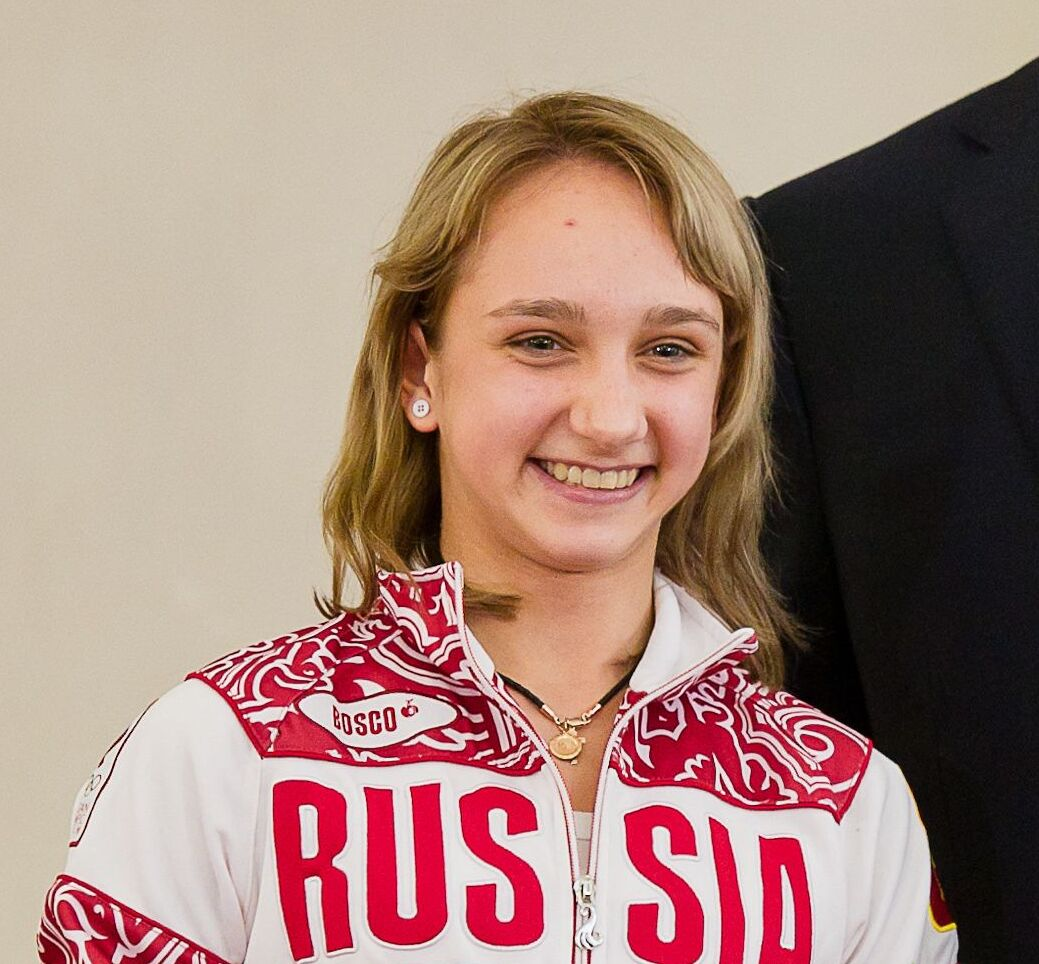
- Komova in 2012

Personal information
- Full name: Viktoria Aleksandrovna Komova
- Nickname: Vika
- Born: 30 January 1995 (age 31) Voronezh, Russia
- Height: 162 cm (5 ft 4 in)
- Relatives: Vera Kolesnikova (mother)

Gymnastics career
- Discipline: Women's artistic gymnastics
- Country represented: Russia; (2008–2018)
- Club: Dynamo
- Gym: Lake Krugloe
- Head coach: Gennady Yelfimov
- Assistant coach: Olga Bulgakova
- Choreographer: Nadezhda Sezina
- Eponymous skills: Komova I: Clear pike circle bwd through hstd with flight and 1/2 turn to hang on HB; Komova II: Clear pike circle backward through handstand with flight to hang on HB
- Retired: 1 January 2019
Medal record
Event	1st	2nd	3rd
Olympic Games	0	2	0
World Championships	2	2	0
European Games	1	0	0
European Championships	1	1	0
Youth Olympic Games	3	0	1
Total	7	5	1
Representing Russia
Olympic Games
Silver medal – second place	2012 London	Team
Silver medal – second place	2012 London	All-Around
World Championships
Gold medal – first place	2011 Tokyo	Uneven Bars
Gold medal – first place	2015 Glasgow	Uneven Bars
Silver medal – second place	2011 Tokyo	Team
Silver medal – second place	2011 Tokyo	All-Around
European Games
Gold medal – first place	2015 Baku	Team
European Championships
Gold medal – first place	2012 Brussels	Uneven Bars
Silver medal – second place	2012 Brussels	Team
Youth Olympic Games
Gold medal – first place	2010 Singapore	All-Around
Gold medal – first place	2010 Singapore	Vault
Gold medal – first place	2010 Singapore	Uneven Bars
Bronze medal – third place	2010 Singapore	Floor Exercise

Viktoria Aleksandrovna Komova (Russian: Виктория Александровна Комова; born 30 January 1995) is a retired Russian artistic gymnast. She is a two-time Olympic medalist, having won silver medals in the all-around and team events at the 2012 Olympics. She is also the 2011 world uneven bars champion and all-around silver medalist, and the 2015 co-world champion on uneven bars. At the junior level, she was the 2010 Youth Olympics all-around champion, uneven bars champion, vault champion, and floor exercise bronze medalist. Komova is known for her fluidity, form and old school Soviet style.

== Early life ==
Komova was born in Voronezh, Russia, to Vera Kolesnikova and Alexander Komov. Her parents both competed successfully in gymnastics. Her mother won a gold medal with the Soviet team at the 1985 World Artistic Gymnastics Championships and is the 1986 Goodwill Games all-around champion. She has an older brother, Alexander, who is nicknamed Sasha.

== Junior career ==
Komova began gymnastics when she was five years old. Her mother coached her for her first three years in the sport. When she was seven, Gennady Yelfimov became her coach. "Now, gymnastics is my life," Komova said in 2010. "I can't imagine my life without it."

=== 2007 ===
In December, Komova competed at her first major junior competition, the 2007 Voronin Memorial Cup. She placed first on vault and floor exercise.

=== 2008 ===
In February, Komova competed at the WOGA Classic in Frisco, Texas. She placed third in the individual all-around competition, with a score of 56.450. In March, she competed at the 2008 Pacific Rim Gymnastics Championships and finished third in the individual all-around competition. In December, she competed at the 2008 Voronin Memorial Cup, where she finished first in the individual all-around, on the vault and the floor exercise; second on the uneven bars and the balance beam.

=== 2009 ===
In July 2009, Komova competed at the 2009 European Youth Summer Olympic Festival in Tampere, Finland. She won a total of 3 gold medals in the individual all-around competition, on the uneven bars and the balance beam. In September, Komova repeated her success in Tampere at the 2009 Junior Japan International Competition in Yokohama, Japan. She won the individual all-around competition with a score of 59.800. In the event finals, she placed first on the uneven bars, scoring 15.050; first on balance beam, scoring 15.150; second on the vault, scoring 15.025; and third on the floor exercise, with 13.850. She finished off her year at the 2009 Voronin Memorial Cup, where she finished first in the individual all-around, on the uneven bars, the floor exercise, and second on the balance beam.

=== 2010 ===
In March, Komova competed at the 2010 Russian Artistic Gymnastics Championships in Penza, Russia. She won the individual all-around with a score of 60.875.

At the end of April, Komova competed at the 2010 European Women's Artistic Gymnastics Championships in Birmingham, United Kingdom. She contributed an all-around score of 57.050 toward the Russian team's first-place finish. Individually, she won the all-around final with a total score of 58.375. In event finals, she placed first on vault, scoring 14.425, and second on balance beam, scoring 14.625.

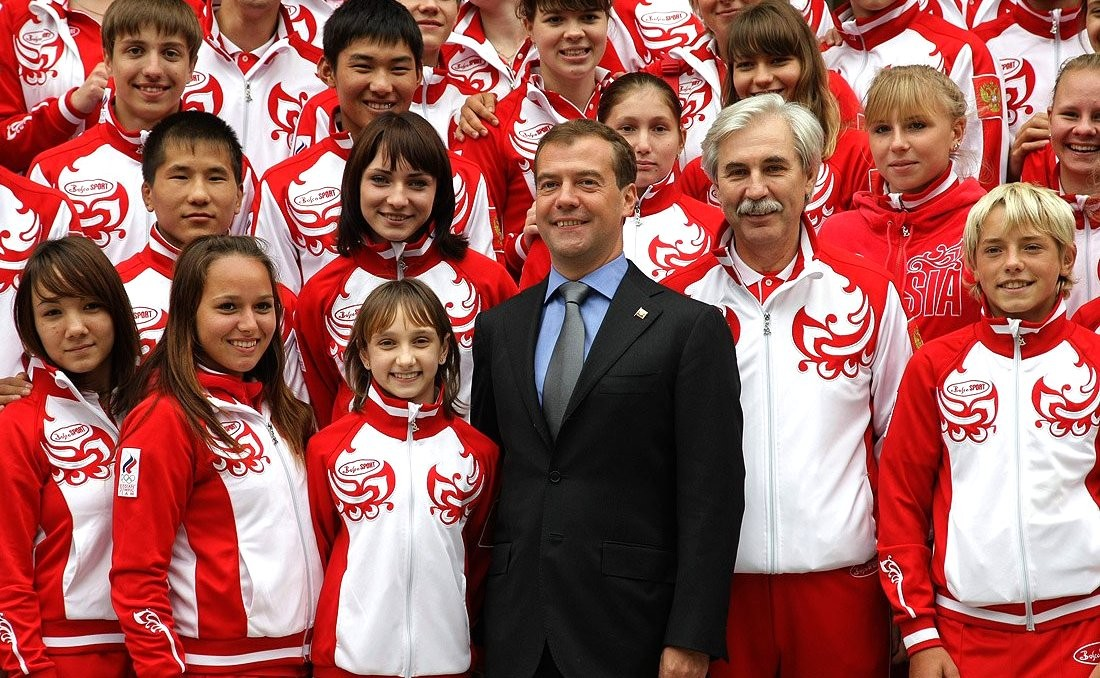
Komova with President Dmitry Medvedev and medalists of the Russian team that participated in the 2010 Summer Youth Olympics on 30 August 2010.

In August, Komova competed at the Youth Olympic Games in Singapore. Before the competition, she said: "It is a big responsibility being the only Russian gymnast competing. There is a lot of pressure on my shoulders because I won the European Junior Championships. I hope I will earn a medal either in the all-around or on an apparatus, and hopefully it will be gold". She won the all-around competition with a total score of 61.250.

In event finals, Komova placed first on vault, scoring 15.312; first on uneven bars, scoring 14.525; seventh on balance beam, scoring 12.000; and third on floor, scoring 14.175.

In November, Komova competed at the "Freddy Cup" Italian Grand Prix in Cagliari, Sardinia. She placed first on uneven bars, scoring 15.500, and second on balance beam, scoring 14.600.

In December, Komova sprained her ankle while walking through the gym. This prevented her from competing in the Voronin Cup.

== Senior career ==
=== 2011 ===
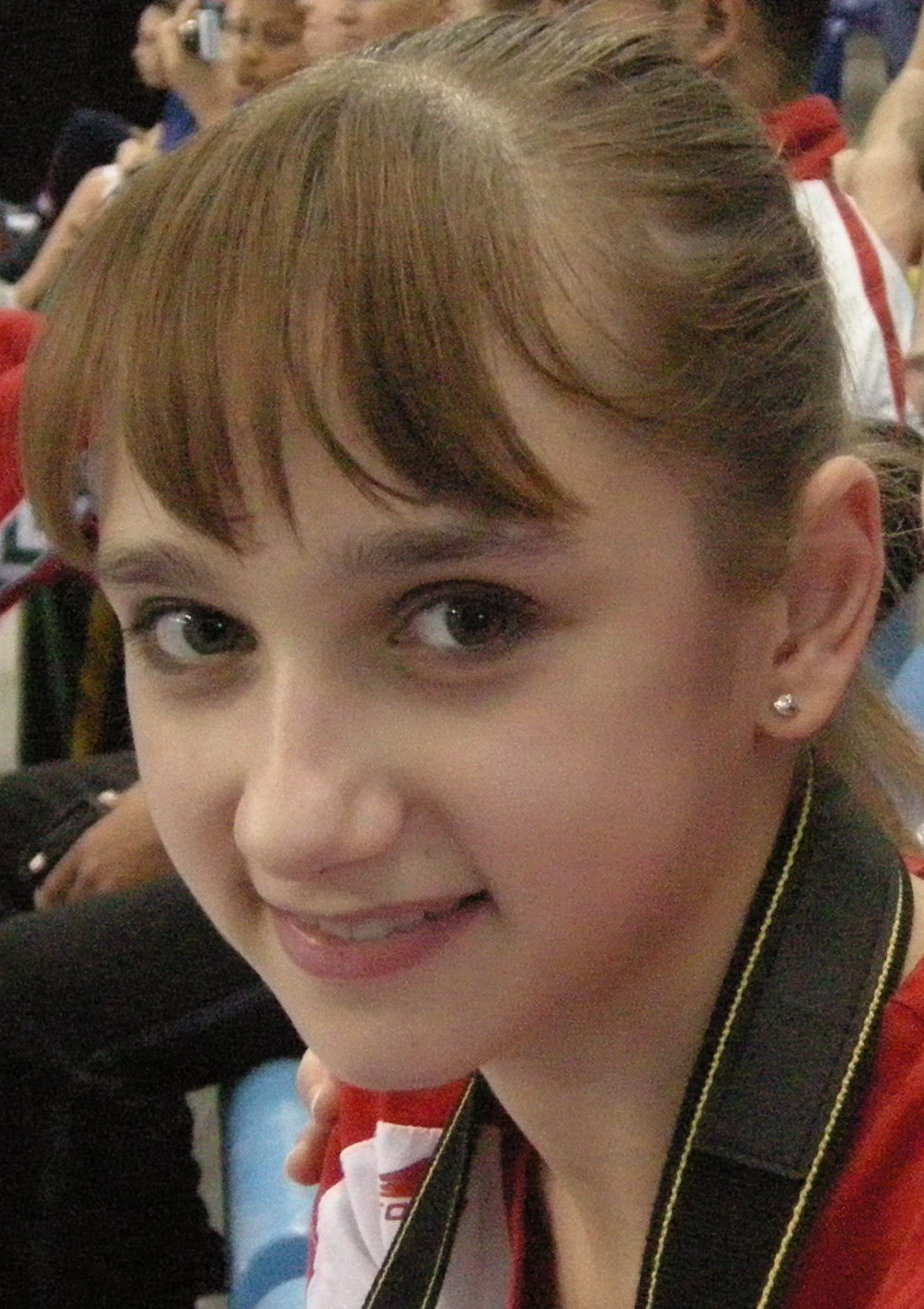
Komova in 2011

In February, Komova re-injured her ankle at the Russian Championships. In May, she had arthroscopic surgery on her right ankle at the Sporthopaedicum Clinic in Germany to tighten the loose ligaments in her ankle. She resumed training in July.

In August, Komova competed at the Russian Cup in Yekaterinburg. She placed second in the all-around competition with a total score of 58.875. In event finals, she placed first on uneven bars, scoring 15.875, and first on balance beam, scoring 15.525.

In September, she competed at the Artistic Gymnastics World Cup event in Ghent, Belgium. She placed first on uneven bars with a score of 15.650.

Later in September, Komova competed at the Dinamo Cup in Penza, Russia. She won the all-around competition with a total of 58.350. In event finals, she placed first on uneven bars, scoring 15.667; first on balance beam, scoring 15.134; and fifth on floor, scoring 13.567.

In October, Komova competed at the World Championships in Tokyo, Japan. She contributed an all-around score of 58.265 toward the Russian team's second-place finish. In the all-around final, she placed second with a score of 59.349. She said afterward: "My vault was not as fully ready as it should have been. On beam, I had mistakes, and my bars were not very well done. My floor routine was mediocre. Today on a beam I did not make some connections, therefore, that's why the lower score. So (this ranking is) deserved. But the Olympics are ahead." In event finals, she placed first on uneven bars, scoring 15.500, and eighth on balance beam, scoring 13.766.

=== 2012 ===
In May, Komova competed at the European Championships in Brussels, Belgium. She contributed scores of 15.508 on uneven bars and 14.916 on balance beam toward the Russian team's second-place finish. In event finals, she placed first on uneven bars with a score of 15.666 and sixth on balance beam with a score of 13.100

In June, Komova competed at the Russian Cup in Penza. She won the all-around competition with a score of 60.767. In event finals, she placed third on uneven bars, scoring 15.100; first on balance beam, scoring 15.325; and second on floor, scoring 14.300.

==== London Olympics ====
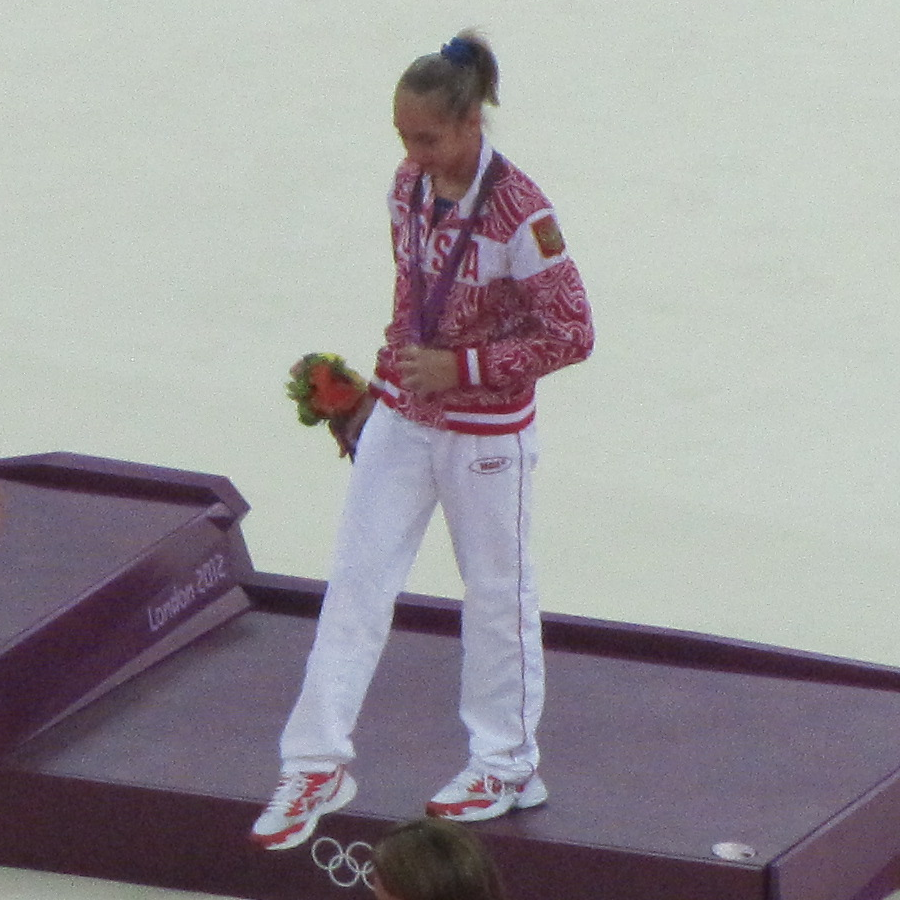
Komova with her silver medal after the individual all-around final at the 2012 Olympics in London.

At the end of July, Komova competed at the 2012 Summer Olympics in London. She qualified in first place for the all-around final with a score of 60.632, third for the uneven bars final with a score of 15.833, and second for the balance beam final with a score of 15.266. In the team final, she contributed scores of 15.833 on vault, 15.766 on uneven bars, and 15.033 on balance beam toward the Russian team's second-place finish. In the all-around final, she placed second with scores of 15.466 on vault, 15.966 on uneven bars, 15.441 on balance beam, and 15.100 on floor exercise, giving her a total of 61.973. In an interview after the competition, Komova said: "I am proud about what I’ve done today, although I am a bit disappointed because I wanted to win the gold. I think I did well. The vault was not very successful, but overall I did well." In this instance on the vault, she took off a little sideways, which caused her to under rotate and step completely off the mat on landing. In the uneven bars final, she placed fifth with a score of 15.666, after hitting the lower bar on a swing leading to dismount. In the balance beam final, she placed eighth with a score of 13.166, after falling off the beam on a front somersault and then falling again on her dismount. After the event finals, she said: "I was not very lucky at these Olympics. I failed them 100%. I don't know if I will continue sports. I will go back home, take some time off, and think through the situation. My parents say everything is okay, but I don't feel that."

=== 2013 ===
Komova took a break from competition to rest a back injury. She said in an interview with International Gymnast Magazine:

"I haven't disappeared. I still train at Round Lake. In competition, I have a temporary break. Maybe I'll come back for the University Games in Kazan, but that will depend on being accepted to university. In the summer, I'll finish school, and I have to apply. If I don't go to the University Games, I will go a little later to a World Cup, this is for sure. Also, competing at the World Championships in September is definitely not out of the question, of course!"

In late August, she was diagnosed with viral meningitis and was unable to compete at the World Championships. Later in the year, she planned to compete but backed out because of having been unable to prepare adequately.

=== 2014 ===
Komova made her return to competition at the 2014 Russian Artistic Gymnastics Championships in Penza in April. She placed 47th in the senior all-around with a total score of 40.767, not competing on floor exercise. In the team final, Komova contributed scores of 14.467 on vault and 15.333 on uneven bars toward the Central Federal District region's first-place finish. In the senior uneven bars final, she placed eighth with a score of 11.467 after falling twice. She also performed an exhibition on balance beam, earning a score of 14.367.

After her performance at the Russian Championships, she was named to the team for the 30th European Championships in Sofia, Bulgaria. Komova was slated to compete on two apparatuses, bars and beam. Only days afterward, she was removed from the roster and slated to undergo surgery in Germany on her right ankle. Ekaterina Kramarenko was called in to replace Komova, but she withdrew shortly after because of illness. Anna Rodionova was selected to replace Kramarenko. Head coach Andrei Rodionenko said that, despite her injury, Komova had a good shot to make the Worlds team because of her experience. However, on 19 September she was taken out of Worlds contention because of an ankle injury.

After her surgery in Germany, Komova returned to Russia, where she was assigned to the Gymnastics Gala in Mexico. There, she competed watered-down beam and floor routines. She returned to the all-around at a small Hungarian meet. Even though she had watered-down routines on every apparatus except for the uneven bars, she performed cleanly and won the competition. In December, she was slated to compete at the Voronin Cup alongside her 2012 Olympic teammates Ksenia Afanasyeva and Anastasia Grishina, both of whom were recovering from injuries of their own.

=== 2015 ===
In June, Komova made her return to major international competition at the 2015 European Games in Baku, Azerbaijan. Competing on a three-person team with Aliya Mustafina and Seda Tutkhalyan, she won the team gold medal. Individually, she had an all-around score of 56.965, third-highest of the competition. However, because the two higher scores were from her own teammates, she did not qualify into the individual all-around final, which is limited to only one gymnast per country in this particular competition.

In September, Komova competed at the Russian Cup, a qualifying meet for the World Championship team. Competing on bars and beam, she helped earn a silver medal for the Central Federal District team. However, her performance in the team qualification and final and in the all-around final was inconsistent, and she did not qualify to event finals. She was allowed to perform an exhibition routine during the uneven bars final, earning a 15.300, unofficially the highest score.

After the Russian Cup, she was named to the provisional team for the 2015 World Artistic Gymnastics Championships in Glasgow, Scotland, as a specialist on vault, uneven bars, and balance beam because her floor exercise was not ready for the all-around competition. After advancing to the bars final, she scored a 15.366, which put her in an unprecedented four-way tie for first place with countrywoman Daria Spiridonova, Fan Yilin of China, and Madison Kocian of the United States.

=== 2016 ===
Despite being named to the Olympic team with 2012 Olympic teammates Aliya Mustafina, Maria Paseka, and Ksenia Afanasyeva, she withdrew herself from Rio contention as a result of severe back pain. It was unclear whether or not she would continue in the sport. In an interview preceding the 2016 Russian Cup, Komova announced that she would head to Munich in late July. She said that if the doctors recommended she stop gymnastics, she would quit. If not, she would continue her elite career. Komova revealed that the results of an analysis in Munich revealed a stress fracture of her fifth vertebrate. She said that she would undergo six months of rest followed by a second analysis of her back to decide if she can compete again. In September, she posted a picture of herself in training on her Instagram account.

=== 2017 ===
Komova returned to the national team training center, Round Lake in May. Dmitry Zanin from Match TV filmed a special about her comeback.

She returned to competition at the 2017 Voronin Cup in December, and finished second in the all-around competition, behind Angelina Melnikova.

=== 2018 ===
In March, Komova competed at the DTB Pokal Team challenge in Stuttgart, Germany as part of the Russian team, alongside Maria Kharenkova, Lilia Akhaimova, Anastasia Ilyankova, and Viktoria Gorbatova. They did not qualify to Team Finals. In April Komova competed at the Russian National Championships where she finished third in the All-Around behind Angelina Melnikova and Angelina Simakova. In June Komova competed at the Russian Cup where she placed third in the All-Around, behind Melnikova and Ilyankova.

=== 2019 ===
In January the Russian Ministry of Sports released the roster for the National Team and Komova was noticeably absent, once again sparking rumors of retirement. At the Russian National Championships Komova was not competing, but rather was commentating alongside retired gymnast Emin Garibov.

== Skills ==
=== Eponymous skills ===
Komova has two eponymous uneven bars transition moves named after her in the Code of Points.

Apparatus	Name	Description	Difficulty (Note: Valid for the 2025–2028 Code of Points)	When Added to Code of Points
Uneven bars	Komova	Clear pike circle backward through handstand with flight and half turn to hang on high bar	E (0.5)	2010 Youth Olympic Games
Uneven bars	Komova II	Clear pike circle backward through handstand with flight to hang on high bar	E (0.5)	2011 World Championships

=== Selected competitive skills ===
Apparatus	Name	Description	Difficulty (Note: Valid for the 2017-2020 Code of Points)	Performed
Vault	Baitova	Yurchenko entry, laid out salto backwards with two twists	5.0	2011, 2015, 2018
Vault	Amanar	Yurchenko entry, laid out salto backwards with 2½ twists	5.4	2010, 2012
Uneven Bars	Komova I	Clear pike circle backward through handstand with flight and half turn to hang on high bar	E	2010–12, 2014
Uneven Bars	Komova II	Clear pike circle backward through handstand with flight to hang on high bar	E	2011–12, 2014–15
Uneven Bars	Inbar Stalder 1/1	Inbar Stalder to full (1/1) pirouette	E	2010–12, 2014
Uneven Bars	Piked Tkatchev	Tkatchev piked	E	2012, 2015, 2018
Uneven Bars	Piked Jaeger	Jaeger Salto piked to hang on high bar	D	2017–18
Uneven Bars	Van Leeuwen	Toe-On Shaposhnikova transition with ½ twist to high bar	E	2015, 2017–18
Uneven Bars	Layout Jaeger	Jaeger Salto stretched to hang on high bar	F	2010–12, 2015
Uneven Bars	Fabrichnova	Swing forward to double salto backward tucked with 2/1 turn (720°)	F	2012
Balance Beam	Arabian	Immediate ½ twist to tucked salto forward	F	2010–12, 2015, 2017–18
Balance Beam	Patterson	Arabian double salto forward tucked	G	2012
Floor Exercise	Andreasen	Tucked Arabian double salto forward	E	2010–12, 2017–18
Floor Exercise	Triple twist	Triple-twisting (3/1) laid out salto backward	E	2010–12
Floor Exercise	Double Layout	Double laid out salto backwards	F	2018

== Later life ==
As of May 2020, Valentina Rodionenko said Komova was asked to be a WAG judge. In June 2022, Komova announced on her Instagram that she married Valery Gorshkov, a Russian ice hockey player. She gave birth to a child in May 2023.

== Public image and impact ==
In 2012, Komova was awarded Order "For Merit to the Fatherland" Order I for her sporting contributions.

In an interview with Bolshoi Sport in 2017, Nellie Kim named Komova, alongside Olga Mostepanova and Simone Biles as who she considers a perfect female gymnast.

Lauded for her supple carriage and ability to combine both artistry and strength, Komova is considered one of the most dominant female gymnasts of the 2010s, despite being plagued with injuries and long breaks away from competitions in the later half of her senior career.

== Competitive history ==
Competitive history of Viktoria Komova at the junior level
Year	Event	Team	AA	VT	UB	BB	FX
2007	Voronin Cup			1st place, gold medalist(s)			1st place, gold medalist(s)
2008	WOGA Classic		3rd place, bronze medalist(s)				
2008	Pacific Rim Championships	6	3rd place, bronze medalist(s)	8	4	4	7
2008	Massilia Gym Cup		11				7
2008	Voronin Cup		1st place, gold medalist(s)	1st place, gold medalist(s)	2nd place, silver medalist(s)		1st place, gold medalist(s)
2009	European Youth Olympic Festival	1st place, gold medalist(s)	1st place, gold medalist(s)	3rd place, bronze medalist(s)	1st place, gold medalist(s)	1st place, gold medalist(s)	6
2009	Japan Junior International		1st place, gold medalist(s)	2nd place, silver medalist(s)	1st place, gold medalist(s)	1st place, gold medalist(s)	3rd place, bronze medalist(s)
2009	Voronin Cup		1st place, gold medalist(s)		1st place, gold medalist(s)		1st place, gold medalist(s)
2010	National Championships		1st place, gold medalist(s)		2nd place, silver medalist(s)		
2010	European Championships	1st place, gold medalist(s)	1st place, gold medalist(s)	1st place, gold medalist(s)	2nd place, silver medalist(s)	1st place, gold medalist(s)	
2010	Youth Olympic Games		1st place, gold medalist(s)	1st place, gold medalist(s)	1st place, gold medalist(s)	7	3rd place, bronze medalist(s)
2010	Italian Grand Prix				1st place, gold medalist(s)	2nd place, silver medalist(s)	

Competitive history of Viktoria Komova at the senior level
Year	Event	Team	AA	VT	UB	BB	FX
2011	National Championships	1st place, gold medalist(s)			3rd place, bronze medalist(s)	4	
2011	Russian Cup		2nd place, silver medalist(s)		1st place, gold medalist(s)	1st place, gold medalist(s)	
2011	Ghent World Cup				1st place, gold medalist(s)	5	
2011	Dinamo International		1st place, gold medalist(s)		1st place, gold medalist(s)	1st place, gold medalist(s)	5
2011	World Championships	2nd place, silver medalist(s)	2nd place, silver medalist(s)		1st place, gold medalist(s)	8	WD
2011	Massilia Gym Cup	1st place, gold medalist(s)	1st place, gold medalist(s)		1st place, gold medalist(s)	2nd place, silver medalist(s)	
2011	Italian Grand Prix				1st place, gold medalist(s)	1st place, gold medalist(s)	
2011	Voronin Cup		1st place, gold medalist(s)		1st place, gold medalist(s)	1st place, gold medalist(s)	1st place, gold medalist(s)
2012	SWI vs. GBR vs. RUS	1st place, gold medalist(s)					
2012	European Championships	2nd place, silver medalist(s)			1st place, gold medalist(s)	6	
2012	Russian Cup	1st place, gold medalist(s)	1st place, gold medalist(s)		2nd place, silver medalist(s)	1st place, gold medalist(s)	2nd place, silver medalist(s)
2012	Olympic Games	2nd place, silver medalist(s)	2nd place, silver medalist(s)		5	8	
2014	National Championships	1st place, gold medalist(s)			8		
2014	Russian Cup	3rd place, bronze medalist(s)			1st place, gold medalist(s)		
2014	KSI Cup (Senior)		1st place, gold medalist(s)		1st place, gold medalist(s)	1st place, gold medalist(s)	2nd place, silver medalist(s)
2015	National Championships	1st place, gold medalist(s)			5	5	
2015	European Games	1st place, gold medalist(s)					
2015	Rusudan Sikharulidze tournament				1st place, gold medalist(s)		
2015	Russian Cup	2nd place, silver medalist(s)				7	
2015	World Championships	4			1st place, gold medalist(s)	4	
2015	Toyota International Cup				7	1st place, gold medalist(s)	
2017	Voronin Cup		2nd place, silver medalist(s)				
2018	National Championships	2nd place, silver medalist(s)	3rd place, bronze medalist(s)		3rd place, bronze medalist(s)	6	
2018	Russian Cup		3rd place, bronze medalist(s)		2nd place, silver medalist(s)		

== Floor music ==
Year	Music Title
2009–10	Carmen Cubana
2011–12	Swan Lake Remix
2012–13	"You Know I'm No Good"/ "The Show Must Go On"
2014–15	Fanatico

== See also ==
- List of Olympic female gymnasts for Russia
