= Wrestling at the 1976 Summer Olympics – Men's Greco-Roman 57 kg =

Men's Greco-Roman 57 kg at the Games of the XXI Olympiad
- Venue: Maurice Richard Arena
- Dates: 20–24 July 1976
- Competitors: 17 from 17 nations

Medalists
| 1st place, gold medalist(s) | | Pertti Ukkola | Finland |
| 2nd place, silver medalist(s) | | Ivan Frgić | Yugoslavia |
| 3rd place, bronze medalist(s) | | Farhat Mustafin | Soviet Union |

The Men's Greco-Roman 57 kg at the 1976 Summer Olympics as part of the wrestling program were held at the Maurice Richard Arena.

== Medalists ==
| Gold | Pertti Ukkola; Finland |
| Silver | Ivan Frgić; Yugoslavia |
| Bronze | Farhat Mustafin; Soviet Union |

== Tournament results ==
The competition used a form of negative points tournament, with negative points given for any result short of a fall. Accumulation of 6 negative points eliminated the loser wrestler. When only three wrestlers remain, a special final round is used to determine the order of the medals.

Legend

- TF — Won by Fall
- IN — Won by Opponent Injury
- DQ — Won by Passivity
- D1 — Won by Passivity, the winner is passive too
- D2 — Both wrestlers lost by Passivity
- FF — Won by Forfeit
- DNA — Did not appear
- TPP — Total penalty points
- MPP — Match penalty points

Penalties

- 0 — Won by Fall, Technical Superiority, Passivity, Injury and Forfeit
- 0.5 — Won by Points, 8-11 points difference
- 1 — Won by Points, 1-7 points difference
- 2 — Won by Passivity, the winner is passive too
- 3 — Lost by Points, 1-7 points difference
- 3.5 — Lost by Points, 8-11 points difference
- 4 — Lost by Fall, Technical Superiority, Passivity, Injury and Forfeit

=== Round 1 ===
| TPP | MPP | | Score | | MPP | TPP |
|---|---|---|---|---|---|---|
| 4 | 4 | Luís Grilo (POR) | DQ / 8:00 | Ali Lachkar (MAR) | 0 | 0 |
| 4 | 4 | Nyamyn Jargalsaikhan (MGL) | DQ / 5:51 | Krasimir Stefanov (BUL) | 0 | 0 |
| 4 | 4 | Joseph Sade (USA) | TF / 0:58 | Josef Krysta (TCH) | 0 | 0 |
| 1 | 1 | Yoshima Suga (JPN) | 6 - 5 | An Han-yeong (KOR) | 3 | 3 |
| 4 | 4 | Józef Lipień (POL) | DQ / 8:00 | Mihai Boţilă (ROU) | 0 | 0 |
| 0 | 0 | Pertti Ukkola (FIN) | DQ / 5:31 | Hans-Jürgen Veil (FRG) | 4 | 4 |
| 1 | 1 | Farhat Mustafin (URS) | 9 - 2 | József Doncsecz (HUN) | 3 | 3 |
| 3 | 3 | Per Lindholm (SWE) | 1 - 8 | Ivan Frgić (YUG) | 1 | 1 |
| 0 | | Douglas Yeats (CAN) | | Bye | | |

=== Round 2 ===
| TPP | MPP | | Score | | MPP | TPP |
|---|---|---|---|---|---|---|
| 4 | 4 | Douglas Yeats (CAN) | TF / 4:05 | Luís Grilo (POR) | 0 | 4 |
| 7.5 | 3.5 | Nyamyn Jargalsaikhan (MGL) | 11 - 22 | Joseph Sade (USA) | 0.5 | 4.5 |
| 3 | 3 | Krasimir Stefanov (BUL) | 9 - 16 | Josef Krysta (TCH) | 1 | 1 |
| 4 | 3 | Yoshima Suga (JPN) | 12 - 16 | Józef Lipień (POL) | 1 | 5 |
| 6.5 | 3.5 | An Han-Young (KOR) | 0 - 8 | Mihai Boţilă (ROU) | 0.5 | 0.5 |
| 1 | 1 | Pertti Ukkola (FIN) | 6 - 5 | Farhat Mustafin (URS) | 3 | 4 |
| 7 | 3 | Hans-Jürgen Veil (FRG) | 7 - 7 | Per Lindholm (SWE) | 1 | 4 |
| 4 | 1 | József Doncsecz (HUN) | 5 - 2 | Ivan Frgić (YUG) | 3 | 4 |
| 0 | | Ali Lachkar (MAR) | | DNA | | |

=== Round 3 ===
| TPP | MPP | | Score | | MPP | TPP |
|---|---|---|---|---|---|---|
| 8 | 4 | Douglas Yeats (CAN) | TF / 5:14 | Krasimir Stefanov (BUL) | 0 | 3 |
| 8 | 4 | Luís Grilo (POR) | 1 - 30 | Joseph Sade (USA) | 0 | 4.5 |
| 4 | 3 | Josef Krysta (TCH) | 6 - 9 | Yoshima Suga (JPN) | 1 | 5 |
| 6 | 1 | Józef Lipień (POL) | 9 - 4 | Pertti Ukkola (FIN) | 3 | 4 |
| 4 | 3.5 | Mihai Boţilă (ROU) | 6 - 14 | Farhat Mustafin (URS) | 0.5 | 4.5 |
| 4 | 0 | József Doncsecz (HUN) | DQ / 8:23 | Per Lindholm (SWE) | 4 | 8 |
| 4 | | Ivan Frgić (YUG) | | Bye | | |

=== Round 4 ===
| TPP | MPP | | Score | | MPP | TPP |
|---|---|---|---|---|---|---|
| 5 | 1 | Ivan Frgić (YUG) | 7 - 3 | Krasimir Stefanov (BUL) | 3 | 6 |
| 8.5 | 4 | Joseph Sade (USA) | TF / 2:12 | Yoshima Suga (JPN) | 0 | 5 |
| 8 | 4 | Josef Krysta (TCH) | 0 - 12 | Mihai Boţilă (ROU) | 0 | 4 |
| 10 | 4 | Józef Lipień (POL) | 4 - 29 | Farhat Mustafin (URS) | 0 | 4.5 |
| 4.5 | 0.5 | Pertti Ukkola (FIN) | 14 - 3 | József Doncsecz (HUN) | 3.5 | 7.5 |

=== Round 5 ===
| TPP | MPP | | Score | | MPP | TPP |
|---|---|---|---|---|---|---|
| 6 | 1 | Ivan Frgić (YUG) | 9 - 4 | Yoshima Suga (JPN) | 3 | 8 |
| 8 | 4 | Mihai Boţilă (ROU) | DQ / 5:19 | Pertti Ukkola (FIN) | 0 | 4.5 |
| 4.5 | | Farhat Mustafin (URS) | | Bye | | |

=== Final ===
Results from the preliminary round are carried forward into the final (shown in yellow).

| TPP | MPP | | Score | | MPP | TPP |
|---|---|---|---|---|---|---|
| | 1 | Pertti Ukkola (FIN) | 6 - 5 | Farhat Mustafin (URS) | 3 | |
| 7 | 4 | Farhat Mustafin (URS) | DQ / 6:03 | Ivan Frgić (YUG) | 0 | |
| 3 | 3 | Ivan Frgić (YUG) | 4 - 5 | Pertti Ukkola (FIN) | 1 | 2 |

== Final standings ==
1. Pertti Ukkola (FIN)
2. Ivan Frgić (YUG)
3. Farhat Mustafin (URS)
4. Yoshima Suga (JPN)
5. Mihai Boţilă (ROU)
6. Krasimir Stefanov (BUL)
7. József Doncsecz (HUN)
8. Josef Krysta (TCH)
