= Wrestling at the 1980 Summer Olympics – Men's Greco-Roman 57 kg =

Men's Greco-Roman 57 kg at the Games of the XXII Olympiad
- Venue: Central Sports Club of the Army
- Dates: 22–24 July 1980
- Competitors: 13 from 13 nations

Medalists
1st place, gold medalist(s)		Shamil Serikov	Soviet Union
2nd place, silver medalist(s)		Józef Lipień	Poland
3rd place, bronze medalist(s)		Benni Ljungbeck	Sweden

The Men's Greco-Roman 57 kg at the 1980 Summer Olympics as part of the wrestling program were held at the Athletics Fieldhouse, Central Sports Club of the Army.

== Medalists ==
Gold	Shamil Serikov; Soviet Union
Silver	Józef Lipień; Poland
Bronze	Benni Ljungbeck; Sweden

== Tournament results ==
The competition used a form of negative points tournament, with negative points given for any result short of a fall. Accumulation of 6 negative points eliminated the loser wrestler. When only three wrestlers remain, a special final round is used to determine the order of the medals.

Legend

- TF — Won by Fall
- IN — Won by Opponent Injury
- DQ — Won by Passivity
- D1 — Won by Passivity, the winner is passive too
- D2 — Both wrestlers lost by Passivity
- FF — Won by Forfeit
- DNA — Did not appear
- TPP — Total penalty points
- MPP — Match penalty points

Penalties

- 0 — Won by Fall, Technical Superiority, Passivity, Injury and Forfeit
- 0.5 — Won by Points, 8-11 points difference
- 1 — Won by Points, 1-7 points difference
- 2 — Won by Passivity, the winner is passive too
- 3 — Lost by Points, 1-7 points difference
- 3.5 — Lost by Points, 8-11 points difference
- 4 — Lost by Fall, Technical Superiority, Passivity, Injury and Forfeit

=== Round 1 ===
TPP	MPP		Score		MPP	TPP
4	4	Julien Mewis (BEL)	TF / 2:28	Shamil Serikov (URS)	0	0
0.5	0.5	Mihai Boţilă (ROU)	14 - 3	Mohamed Nakdali (SYR)	3.5	3.5
0	0	Antonino Caltabiano (ITA)	DQ / 6:45	Herbert Nigsch (AUT)	4	4
0	0	Benni Ljungbeck (SWE)	DQ / 5:27	Leonel Pérez (CUB)	4	4
4	4	Pertti Ukkola (FIN)	TF / 7:23	Georgi Donev (BUL)	0	0
1	1	Józef Lipień (POL)	11 - 5	Josef Krysta (TCH)	3	3
0		Gyula Molnár (HUN)		Bye		

=== Round 2 ===
TPP	MPP		Score		MPP	TPP
0	0	Gyula Molnár (HUN)	TF / 4:26	Julien Mewis (BEL)	4	8
0	0	Shamil Serikov (URS)	TF / 1:25	Mihai Boţilă (ROU)	4	4.5
7.5	4	Mohamed Nakdali (SYR)	DQ / 7:37	Antonino Caltabiano (ITA)	0	0
8	4	Herbert Nigsch (AUT)	DQ / 7:05	Benni Ljungbeck (SWE)	0	0
8	4	Leonel Pérez (CUB)	DQ / 8:43	Pertti Ukkola (FIN)	0	4
4	4	Georgi Donev (BUL)	TF / 7:17	Józef Lipień (POL)	0	1
3		Josef Krysta (TCH)		Bye		

=== Round 3 ===
TPP	MPP		Score		MPP	TPP
3	0	Josef Krysta (TCH)	TF / 4:00	Gyula Molnár (HUN)	4	4
1	1	Shamil Serikov (URS)	3 - 2	Antonino Caltabiano (ITA)	3	3
5.5	1	Mihai Boţilă (ROU)	6 - 4	Pertti Ukkola (FIN)	3	7
1	1	Benni Ljungbeck (SWE)	10 - 4	Georgi Donev (BUL)	3	7
1		Józef Lipień (POL)		Bye		

=== Round 4 ===
TPP	MPP		Score		MPP	TPP
2	1	Józef Lipień (POL)	10 - 4	Gyula Molnár (HUN)	3	7
7	4	Josef Krysta (TCH)	DQ / 7:58	Shamil Serikov (URS)	0	1
7.5	2	Mihai Boţilă (ROU)	D1 / 8:11	Antonino Caltabiano (ITA)	4	7
1		Benni Ljungbeck (SWE)		Bye		

=== Round 5 ===
TPP	MPP		Score		MPP	TPP
5	4	Benni Ljungbeck (SWE)	TF / 2:42	Shamil Serikov (URS)	0	1
6	4	Józef Lipień (POL)	D2 / 8:37	Mihai Boţilă (ROU)	4	11.5

=== Final ===
Results from the preliminary round are carried forward into the final (shown in yellow).

TPP	MPP		Score		MPP	TPP
	4	Benni Ljungbeck (SWE)	TF / 2:42	Shamil Serikov (URS)	0	
8	4	Benni Ljungbeck (SWE)	D2 / 8:25	Józef Lipień (POL)	4	
1	1	Shamil Serikov (URS)	11 - 4	Józef Lipień (POL)	3	7

== Final standings ==
1. Shamil Serikov (URS)
2. Józef Lipień (POL)
3. Benni Ljungbeck (SWE)
4. Mihai Boţilă (ROU)
5. Antonino Caltabiano (ITA)
6. Josef Krysta (TCH)
7. Gyula Molnár (HUN)
8. Georgi Donev (BUL)
