= Gymnastics at the 2013 Summer Universiade – Women's artistic individual all-around =

The women's artistic individual all-around gymnastics competition at the 2013 Summer Universiade was held on July 9 at the Gymnastics Centre in Kazan.

== Results ==
Rank	Gymnast	Vault (gymnastics)	Uneven bars	Balance beam	Floor (gymnastics)	Total
1st place, gold medalist(s)	Aliya Mustafina (RUS)	14.750	15.200	14.050	13.900	57.900
2nd place, silver medalist(s)	Ksenia Afanasyeva (RUS)	14.950	13.750	13.150	15.000	56.850
3rd place, bronze medalist(s)	Kim Bùi (GER)	13.650	14.500	13.550	13.500	55.200
4	Elsabeth Black (CAN)	14.700	13.250	14.600	12.450	55.000
5	Lisa Katharina Hill (GER)	13.900	14.350	13.250	12.650	54.150
6	Hannah Whelan (GBR)	14.050	12.750	14.100	12.750	53.650
7	Elsa García (MEX)	14.200	12.300	13.950	12.700	53.150
8	Zhang Yelinzi (CHN)	13.750	12.450	14.400	12.450	53.050
9	Yu Minobe (JPN)	12.450	12.850	14.250	13.400	52.950
9	Dorina Böczögő (HUN)	14.000	12.550	12.700	13.700	52.950
11	Mizuho Nagai (JPN)	14.500	13.000	12.300	13.000	52.800
12	Heo Seon-mi (KOR)	13.900	13.150	12.700	12.450	52.200
13	Angelina Kysla (UKR)	13.750	13.000	12.350	13.000	52.100
14	Jana Šikulová (CZE)	13.550	13.600	12.500	12.350	52.000
15	Karla Salazar Gutierrez (MEX)	13.500	12.850	12.850	12.250	51.450
16	Kang Yong Mi (PRK)	13.600	12.800	12.350	12.500	51.250
17	Heem Wei Lim (SIN)	13.500	12.350	12.800	12.300	50.950
18	Mackenzie Itcush (CAN)	13.550	11.150	12.750	12.400	49.850
19	Pak Sin Hyang (PRK)	13.750	11.800	11.850	12.050	49.450
20	Annika Urvikko (FIN)	13.200	13.500	11.550	11.050	49.300
21	Carmen Horvat (SLO)	13.450	11.850	12.050	11.300	48.650
21	Rita Oliveira (POR)	13.100	11.800	12.250	11.500	48.650
23	Charlotte Lindsley (GBR)	12.450	12.950	10.900	11.950	48.250
24	Mai Liu Hsiang Han (TPE)	12.600	10.750	13.100	11.050	47.500
