= Gymnastics at the 2013 Summer Universiade – Women's artistic team all-around =

The women's artistic team all-around gymnastics competition at the 2013 Summer Universiade was held on July 7 at the Gymnastics Centre in Kazan.

== Results ==
Rank	Team	Vault (gymnastics)	Uneven bars	Balance beam	Floor (gymnastics)	Total
1st place, gold medalist(s)	Russia	45.050 (1)	43.650 (1)	44.750 (1)	42.050 (1)	175.500
1st place, gold medalist(s)	Aliya Mustafina	14.950	15.000	15.200	13.750	175.500
1st place, gold medalist(s)	Ksenia Afanasyeva	15.000	12.550	14.250	14.750	175.500
1st place, gold medalist(s)	Tatiana Nabieva	14.850	14.400	13.750	13.050	175.500
1st place, gold medalist(s)	Anna Dementyeva		14.250	15.300	13.550	175.500
1st place, gold medalist(s)	Maria Paseka	15.100				175.500
2nd place, silver medalist(s)	Japan	41.900 (4)	40.600 (2)	41.950 (2)	40.550 (2)	165.000
2nd place, silver medalist(s)	Yu Minobe	13.150	14.050	14.350	13.600	165.000
2nd place, silver medalist(s)	Mizuho Nagai	14.600	13.000	13.600	13.400	165.000
2nd place, silver medalist(s)	Sakura Noda	13.500	13.200	14.000	13.550	165.000
2nd place, silver medalist(s)	Arisa Tominaga	13.800	13.350	13.200		165.000
2nd place, silver medalist(s)	Shizuka Tozawa				13.350	165.000
3rd place, bronze medalist(s)	Germany	41.700 (5)	40.550 (3)	39.450 (3)	40.350 (3)	162.050
3rd place, bronze medalist(s)	Kim Bùi	13.900	14.050	13.150	13.700	162.050
3rd place, bronze medalist(s)	Lisa Katharina Hill	14.000	14.100	12.500	13.400	162.050
3rd place, bronze medalist(s)	Pia Tolle	13.800	10.950	13.800	13.250	162.050
3rd place, bronze medalist(s)	Annabelle Hölzer	13.300	12.400	12.400	11.500	162.050
4	Mexico	42.550 (3)	38.250 (5)	37.350 (6)	40.200 (4)	158.350
4	Elsa García	14.300	13.600	13.050	14.300	158.350
4	Karla Salazar Gutierrez	13.250	11.900	12.300	13.050	158.350
4	Marisela Cantu Mata	13.000	12.750	10.500	12.850	158.350
4	Alexa Moreno	15.000	9.200	12.000	11.200	158.350
5	DPR Korea	43.650 (2)	38.150 (7)	37.900 (5)	36.900 (8)	156.600
5	Pak Sin Hyang	13.900	12.200	13.900	11.550	156.600
5	Kang Yong Mi	13.400	13.500	11.100	12.650	156.600
5	Hong Un Jong	15.050	12.000	9.150	11.550	156.600
5	Ri Un Ha	14.700			12.700	156.600
5	Kim Un Hyang		12.450	12.900		156.600
6	United Kingdom	39.550 (9)	37.400 (8)	39.350 (4)	39.400 (5)	155.700
6	Hannah Whelan	14.000	12.500	13.550	13.100	155.700
6	Charlotte Lindsley	12.550	12.000	13.000	12.200	155.700
6	Danusia Francis		12.900	12.800	13.750	155.700
6	Rebecca Hall	13.000		11.100	12.550	155.700
7	Canada	40.900 (6)	36.100 (9)	36.850 (7)	38.200 (6)	152.050
7	Elsabeth Black	14.850	12.900	13.850	13.600	152.050
7	Mackenzie Itcush	13.650	11.500	11.350	12.200	152.050
7	Natalie Gervais	12.400	10.850	10.800	12.400	152.050
7	Erica Devereaux	12.300			12.000	152.050
7	Sarah Flett		11.700	11.650		152.050
8	Ukraine	39.600 (8)	38.250 (5)	36.300 (8)	37.750 (7)	151.900
8	Angelina Kysla	13.900	13.400	12.200	13.550	151.900
8	Viktoriya Oshurkova	12.950	10.250	11.500	11.450	151.900
8	Maryna Kostyuchenko	12.750	13.450		12.350	151.900
8	Valentina Holenkova	12.250		11.150	11.850	151.900
8	Yana Demyanchuk		11.400	12.600		151.900
9	Republic of Korea	38.300 (10)	38.450 (4)	34.650 (10)	35.100 (10)	146.500
9	Heo Seon-mi	13.700	13.550	12.700	12.750	146.500
9	Eum Eun-hui	12.250	13.000	10.950	11.150	146.500
9	Park Ji-yeon		11.900	10.050	11.200	146.500
9	Park Do-eun	11.100		11.000	10.350	146.500
9	Moon Eun-mee	12.350	10.200			146.500
10	Chinese Taipei	38.000 (11)	30.800 (10)	35.150 (9)	35.350 (9)	139.300
10	Mai Liu Hsiang Han	12.400	11.100	12.450	11.900	139.300
10	Chen Yu Chun	12.150	10.550	12.000	11.300	139.300
10	Lo Yu Ju	13.450	9.150	10.700	12.150	139.300
11	Slovenia	40.250 (7)	21.950 (11)	34.400 (11)	21.800 (11)	118.400
11	Carmen Horvat	13.150	12.050	11.650	11.400	118.400
11	Tina Ribic	13.100	9.900	10.000	10.400	118.400
11	Teja Belak	14.000		12.750		118.400
