= Gymnastics at the 2013 Summer Universiade – Women's uneven bars =

The women's uneven bars gymnastics competition at the 2013 Summer Universiade was held on July 10 at the Gymnastics Centre in Kazan.

== Results ==
Rank	Gymnast	D Score	E Score	Pen.	Total
1st place, gold medalist(s)	Aliya Mustafina (RUS)	6.3	8.900		15.200
2nd place, silver medalist(s)	Tatiana Nabieva (RUS)	6.0	8.525		14.525
3rd place, bronze medalist(s)	Lisa Katharina Hill (GER)	6.1	8.400		14.500
4	Kim Bùi (GER)	6.1	8.350		14.450
5	Kang Yong-mi (PRK)	6.1	8.225		14.325
6	Yu Minobe (JPN)	5.8	8.325		14.125
7	Heo Seon-mi (KOR)	5.7	8.225		13.925
8	Maryna Kostiuchenko (UKR)	4.9	6.875		11.775
