= Lipien =

Lipień is a Polish surname. Notable people with the surname include:

- Józef Lipień (born 1949), Polish Greco-Roman wrestler
- Kazimierz Lipień (1949–2005), Polish Greco-Roman wrestler, twin-brother of Józef
