= Gymnastics at the 2011 Summer Universiade – Women's balance beam =

The Women's balance beam competition at the 2011 Summer Universiade in Shenzhen, China was held at the Bao'an Stadium on August 16. Yu Minobe and Mai Yamagishi from Japan won the gold and bronze, Guan Wenli from China took the silver.

== Medalists ==
| Gold | Silver | Bronze |
|---|---|---|
| Yu Minobe; Japan | Guan Wenli; China | Mai Yamagishi; Japan |

== Final results ==
| Rank | Gymnast | Nation | D Score | E Score | Pen. | Total |
|---|---|---|---|---|---|---|
| 1st place, gold medalist(s) | Yu Minobe | Japan | 5.800 | 8.675 | | 14.475 |
| 2nd place, silver medalist(s) | Guan Wenli | China | 6.400 | 7.600 | | 14.000 |
| 3rd place, bronze medalist(s) | Mai Yamagishi | Japan | 5.800 | 8.025 | | 13.825 |
| 4 | Yana Demyanchuk | Ukraine | 6.300 | 7.500 | | 13.800 |
| 5 | Xiao Kangjun | China | 5.500 | 8.275 | 0.1 | 13.675 |
| 6 | Jo Hyun-joo | South Korea | 5.500 | 7.850 | | 13.350 |
| 7 | Anastasia Koval | Ukraine | 6.000 | 7.050 | | 13.050 |
| 8 | Alena Polyan | Russia | 5.400 | 7.150 | | 12.550 |
