= Gyula Molnár (wrestler) =

Hungarian wrestler (born 1947)

Personal information
- Nationality: Hungarian
- Born: 13 November 1947 (age 78) Pestszenterzsébet, Hungary

Sport
- Sport: Wrestling
Medal record
Representing Hungary
Summer Universiade
Silver medal – second place	1973 Moscow	57 kg

Gyula Molnár (born 13 November 1947) is a Hungarian wrestler. He competed in the men's Greco-Roman 57 kg at the 1980 Summer Olympics.
