= Krasimir Stefanov =

Bulgarian wrestler

Personal information
- Nationality: Bulgarian
- Born: 1 February 1949 (age 77)

Sport
- Sport: Wrestling

Krasimir Stefanov (born 1 February 1949) is a Bulgarian wrestler. He competed in the men's Greco-Roman 57 kg at the 1976 Summer Olympics.
