= Georgi Donev =

Bulgarian wrestler

Personal information
- Nationality: Bulgarian
- Born: 25 May 1958 (age 68)

Sport
- Sport: Wrestling

Georgi Donev (born 25 May 1958) is a Bulgarian wrestler. He competed in the men's Greco-Roman 57 kg at the 1980 Summer Olympics.
