= Benni Ljungbeck =

Swedish wrestler (born 1958)

Medal record

Men's Greco-Roman wrestling

Representing Sweden

Olympic Games
| Bronze medal – third place | 1980 Moscow | 57 kg |

Benni Ljungbeck (born 20 July 1958) is a Swedish wrestler. He was born in Skåne. He won an Olympic bronze medal in Greco-Roman wrestling in 1980. He also competed at the 1984 and 1988 Olympics.
