= Leonel Pérez =

Cuban wrestler (born 1953)

Personal information
- Full name: Leonel Pérez Almeida
- Nationality: Cuban
- Born: 28 October 1953 (age 72)
- Height: 165 cm (5 ft 5 in)

Sport
- Sport: Wrestling
- Weight class: 57 kg
Medal record
Men's Greco-Roman wrestling
Representing Cuba
Pan American Games
Gold medal – first place	1979 San Juan	57 kg
Silver medal – second place	1975 Mexico	57 kg

Leonel Pérez Almeida (Note: In this Spanish name, the first or paternal surname is Pérez and the second or maternal family name is Almeida.) (born 28 October 1953) is a Cuban wrestler. He competed for Cuba at the 1980 Summer Olympics in the men's Greco-Roman 57 kg event.

Pérez earned two medals for Cuba at the Pan American Games, a gold medal in 1979 and a silver medal in 1975.
