= Shamil Serikov =

Soviet wrestler (1956–1989)

Medal record

Men's Greco-Roman wrestling

Representing the Soviet Union

Olympic Games
Gold medal – first place	1980 Moscow	57 kg

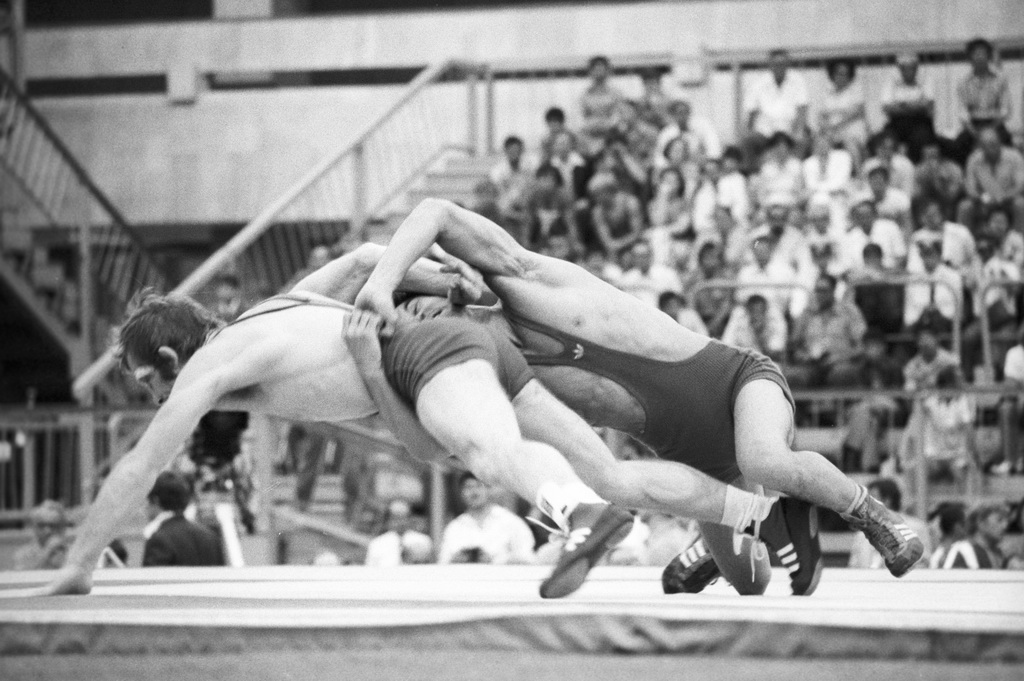

Shamil Serikov (5 March 1956 – 22 November 1989) was a Soviet wrestler and Olympic Champion, who was born in Alma-Ata, Kazakh SSR.

He competed at the 1980 Summer Olympics in Moscow where he won a gold medal in Greco-Roman wrestling, the bantamweight class. Serikov died by suicide in 1989.
