= Farhat Mustafin =

Russian wrestler (born 1950)

Medal record

Men's Greco-Roman wrestling

Representing the Soviet Union

Olympic Games
Bronze medal – third place	1976 Montreal	57 kg

Farhat Mustafin (born 7 September 1950), also spelled Farkhat or Farkhad, is a Russian former wrestler of Volga Tatar descent who competed for the Soviet Union in the 1976 Summer Olympics where he won a bronze medal in Greco-Roman wrestling as a bantamweight.

He is the father of Russian artistic gymnast and Olympic Gold medalist Aliya Mustafina.
