= Ivan Frgić =

Serbian wrestler (1953–2015)

Personal information
- Born: 18 July 1953 Sombor, Yugoslavia
- Died: 31 October 2015 (aged 62) Sombor, Serbia

Sport
- Sport: Greco-Roman wrestling
Medal record
Representing Yugoslavia
Olympic Games
Silver medal – second place	1976 Montreal	57 kg
World Championships
Silver medal – second place	1978 Mexico City	57 kg
Bronze medal – third place	1974 Katowice	57 kg
Bronze medal – third place	1977 Gothenburg	57 kg
European Championships
Gold medal – first place	1975 Ludwigshafen	57 kg
Bronze medal – third place	1973 Helsinki	57 kg
Mediterranean Games
Gold medal – first place	1975 Algiers	57 kg
Gold medal – first place	1979 Split	62 kg
Summer Universiade
Silver medal – second place	1977 Sofia	62 kg

Ivan Frgić (18 July 1953 – 31 October 2015) was a Serbian wrestler of Croat origin who competed in the 1976 Summer Olympics and in the 1980 Summer Olympics.
