= 2014 World Artistic Gymnastics Championships =

Gymnastics competition

2014 World Artistic Gymnastics Championships

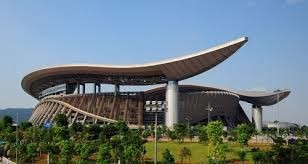
- Guangxi Gym, where the competition took place
- Venue: Guangxi Gymnasium
- Location: Nanning, China
- Start date: 3 October 2014
- End date: 12 October 2014

The 2014 World Artistic Gymnastics Championships was held in Nanning, China at the Guangxi Gymnasium from 3–12 October 2014. The competition was the fourth time a World Artistic Gymnastics Championships has been held in the continent of Asia.

== Competition schedule ==
All times are CST (UTC+8).

| Date | Time | Round |
|---|---|---|
| 3 October 2014 | 09:00 | Men's qualifying (Day 1) |
| 4 October 2014 | 09:00 | Men's qualifying (Day 2) |
| 5 October 2014 | 09:00 | Women's qualifying (Day 1) |
| 6 October 2014 | 09:00 | Women's qualifying (Day 2) |
| 7 October 2014 | 19:00 | Men's team final |
| 8 October 2014 | 19:00 | Women's team final |
| 9 October 2014 | 19:00 | Men's all-around final |
| 10 October 2014 | 19:00 | Women's all-around final |

| Date | Time | Round |
|---|---|---|
| 11 October 2014 | 13:00 | Men's floor final |
| 11 October 2014 | 14:55 | Women's vault final |
| 11 October 2014 | 15:45 | Men's pommel horse final |
| 11 October 2014 | 16:10 | Women's uneven bars final |
| 11 October 2014 | 16:35 | Men's rings final |
| 12 October 2014 | 13:00 | Men's vault final |
| 12 October 2014 | 14:55 | Women's balance beam final |
| 12 October 2014 | 15:45 | Men's parallel bars final |
| 12 October 2014 | 16:10 | Women's floor final |
| 12 October 2014 | 16:40 | Men's horizontal bar final |

== Venues ==
=== Main Arena ===
The main arena where the competition was held was the Guangxi Gymnasium, which opened in 2012.

=== Training Gymnasium ===
The training facility for the competition was held at the Li Ning Sports Park. As per any International Gymnastics Federation competition format, there was a podium training session where the gymnast trains on the podium in the arena to get a feel for the competition equipment on a raised surface.

== Mascots ==
In April 2013, the mascots Nannan (male) and Ningning (female) were unveiled as the official mascots of the event.

== Medalists ==
| Event | Gold | Silver | Bronze |
|---|---|---|---|
Men
| Team all-around | China; Cheng Ran; Deng Shudi; Lin Chaopan; Liu Yang; You Hao; Zhang Chenglong; Liu Rongbing | Japan; Kohei Kameyama; Ryohei Kato; Shogo Nonomura; Kenzo Shirai; Yusuke Tanaka; Kōhei Uchimura; Kazuyuki Takeda | United States; Jacob Dalton; Danell Leyva; Sam Mikulak; Alexander Naddour; John Orozco; Donnell Whittenburg; Paul Ruggeri |
| Individual all-around | Kōhei Uchimura (JPN) | Max Whitlock (GBR) | Yusuke Tanaka (JPN) |
| Floor | Denis Ablyazin (RUS) | Kenzo Shirai (JPN) | Diego Hypólito (BRA) |
| Pommel horse | Krisztián Berki (HUN) | Filip Ude (CRO) | Cyril Tommasone (FRA) |
| Rings | Liu Yang (CHN) | Arthur Zanetti (BRA) | You Hao (CHN) Denis Ablyazin (RUS) |
| Vault | Ri Se-gwang (PRK) | Ihor Radivilov (UKR) | Jacob Dalton (USA) |
| Parallel bars | Oleg Verniaiev (UKR) | Danell Leyva (USA) | Ryohei Kato (JPN) |
| Horizontal bar | Epke Zonderland (NED) | Kōhei Uchimura (JPN) | Marijo Možnik (CRO) |
Women
| Team all-around | United States; Kyla Ross; Simone Biles; Mykayla Skinner; Alyssa Baumann; Madison Kocian; Ashton Locklear; Madison Desch | China; Yao Jinnan; Chen Siyi; Shang Chunsong; Huang Huidan; Bai Yawen; Tan Jiaxin; Xie Yufen | Russia; Aliya Mustafina; Tatiana Nabieva; Ekaterina Kramarenko; Alla Sosnitskaya; Daria Spiridonova; Maria Kharenkova; Polina Fedorova |
| Individual all-around | Simone Biles (USA) | Larisa Iordache (ROU) | Kyla Ross (USA) |
| Vault | Hong Un-jong (PRK) | Simone Biles (USA) | Mykayla Skinner (USA) |
| Uneven bars | Yao Jinnan (CHN) | Huang Huidan (CHN) | Daria Spiridonova (RUS) |
| Balance beam | Simone Biles (USA) | Bai Yawen (CHN) | Aliya Mustafina (RUS) |
| Floor | Simone Biles (USA) | Larisa Iordache (ROU) | Aliya Mustafina (RUS) |

=== Medal table ===
| Rank | Nation | Gold | Silver | Bronze | Total |
|---|---|---|---|---|---|
| 1 | United States (USA) | 4 | 2 | 4 | 10 |
| 2 | China (CHN) | 3 | 3 | 1 | 7 |
| 3 | North Korea (PRK) | 2 | 0 | 0 | 2 |
| 4 | Japan (JPN) | 1 | 3 | 2 | 6 |
| 5 | Ukraine (UKR) | 1 | 1 | 0 | 2 |
| 6 | Russia (RUS) | 1 | 0 | 5 | 6 |
| 7 | Hungary (HUN) | 1 | 0 | 0 | 1 |
| 7 | Netherlands (NED) | 1 | 0 | 0 | 1 |
| 9 | Romania (ROU) | 0 | 2 | 0 | 2 |
| 10 | Brazil (BRA) | 0 | 1 | 1 | 2 |
| 10 | Croatia (CRO) | 0 | 1 | 1 | 2 |
| 12 | Great Britain (GBR) | 0 | 1 | 0 | 1 |
| 13 | France (FRA) | 0 | 0 | 1 | 1 |
| Totals (13 entries) | | 14 | 14 | 15 | 43 |

==== Men ====
| Rank | Nation | Gold | Silver | Bronze | Total |
|---|---|---|---|---|---|
| 1 | China | 2 | 0 | 1 | 3 |
| 2 | Japan | 1 | 3 | 2 | 6 |
| 3 | Ukraine | 1 | 1 | 0 | 2 |
| 4 | Russia | 1 | 0 | 1 | 2 |
| 5 | Hungary | 1 | 0 | 0 | 1 |
| 5 | Netherlands | 1 | 0 | 0 | 1 |
| 5 | North Korea | 1 | 0 | 0 | 1 |
| 8 | United States | 0 | 1 | 2 | 3 |
| 9 | Brazil | 0 | 1 | 1 | 2 |
| 9 | Croatia | 0 | 1 | 1 | 2 |
| 11 | Great Britain | 0 | 1 | 0 | 1 |
| 12 | France | 0 | 0 | 1 | 1 |
| Totals (12 entries) | | 8 | 8 | 9 | 25 |

==== Women ====
| Rank | Nation | Gold | Silver | Bronze | Total |
|---|---|---|---|---|---|
| 1 | United States | 4 | 1 | 2 | 7 |
| 2 | China | 1 | 3 | 0 | 4 |
| 3 | North Korea | 1 | 0 | 0 | 1 |
| 4 | Romania | 0 | 2 | 0 | 2 |
| 5 | Russia | 0 | 0 | 4 | 4 |
| Totals (5 entries) | | 6 | 6 | 6 | 18 |

== Men's results ==
=== Team competition ===
| Rank | Team | Floor (gymnastics) | Pommel horse | Rings (gymnastics) | Vault (gymnastics) | Parallel bars | Horizontal bar | Total |
|---|---|---|---|---|---|---|---|---|
| 1st place, gold medalist(s) | China | 44.766 (5) | 43.724 (4) | 46.532 (1) | 46.066 (1) | 46.324 (1) | 45.957 (1) | 273.369 |
| 1st place, gold medalist(s) | Cheng Ran | 14.000 | - | - | 15.400 | - | - | 273.369 |
| 1st place, gold medalist(s) | Deng Shudi | 15.666 | 14.233 | 15.166 | 15.300 | 14.791 | 14.758 | 273.369 |
| 1st place, gold medalist(s) | Lin Chaopan | 15.100 | 14.558 | - | 15.366 | 15.900 | 15.233 | 273.369 |
| 1st place, gold medalist(s) | Liu Yang | - | - | 15.900 | - | - | - | 273.369 |
| 1st place, gold medalist(s) | You Hao | - | 14.933 | 15.466 | - | 15.633 | - | 273.369 |
| 1st place, gold medalist(s) | Zhang Chenglong | - | - | - | - | - | 15.966 | 273.369 |
| 2nd place, silver medalist(s) | Japan | 46.732 (1) | 45.341 (2) | 44.532 (4) | 45.766 (2) | 46.032 (2) | 44.866 (2) | 273.269 |
| 2nd place, silver medalist(s) | Kohei Kameyama | - | 15.300 | - | - | - | - | 273.269 |
| 2nd place, silver medalist(s) | Ryohei Kato | 15.266 | 14.775 | - | 14.966 | 15.233 | 14.200 | 273.269 |
| 2nd place, silver medalist(s) | Shogo Nonomura | - | - | 14.666 | - | 15.633 | - | 273.269 |
| 2nd place, silver medalist(s) | Kenzo Shirai | 15.766 | - | - | 15.400 | - | - | 273.269 |
| 2nd place, silver medalist(s) | Yusuke Tanaka | - | - | 15.033 | - | 15.166 | 15.266 | 273.269 |
| 2nd place, silver medalist(s) | Kōhei Uchimura | 15.700 | 15.266 | 14.833 | 15.400 | - | 15.400 | 273.269 |
| 3rd place, bronze medalist(s) | United States | 46.500 (2) | 44.240 (3) | 44.766 (3) | 45.065 (5) | 45.365 (4) | 44.433 (3) | 270.369 |
| 3rd place, bronze medalist(s) | Jacob Dalton | 15.900 | - | 15.000 | 14.933 | - | 14.500 | 270.369 |
| 3rd place, bronze medalist(s) | Danell Leyva | - | 14.466 | - | - | 15.666 | 15.100 | 270.369 |
| 3rd place, bronze medalist(s) | Samuel Mikulak | 15.300 | 14.708 | - | 15.166 | - | - | 270.369 |
| 3rd place, bronze medalist(s) | Alexander Naddour | - | 15.066 | 15.000 | - | - | - | 270.369 |
| 3rd place, bronze medalist(s) | John Orozco | - | - | - | - | 15.066 | 14.833 | 270.369 |
| 3rd place, bronze medalist(s) | Donnell Whittenburg | 15.300 | - | 14.766 | 14.966 | 14.633 | - | 270.369 |
| 4 | Great Britain | 45.633 (4) | 45.649 (1) | 44.166 (6) | 45.657 (3) | 43.966 (5) | 44.099 (4) | 269.170 |
| 4 | Daniel Keatings | - | 15.633 | - | - | 13.933 | - | 269.170 |
| 4 | Daniel Purvis | 15.100 | 14.500 | - | - | 15.200 | - | 269.170 |
| 4 | Kristian Thomas | 15.233 | - | - | 15.491 | - | 14.900 | 269.170 |
| 4 | Courtney Tulloch | - | - | 14.966 | - | - | - | 269.170 |
| 4 | Max Whitlock | 15.300 | 15.516 | 14.600 | 15.366 | - | 14.366 | 269.170 |
| 4 | Nile Wilson | - | - | 14.600 | 14.800 | 14.833 | 14.833 | 269.170 |
| 5 | Russia | 45.715 (3) | 42.933 (7) | 46.391 (2) | 44.999 (6) | 43.032 (8) | 43.433 (6) | 266.503 |
| 5 | Denis Ablyazin | 15.583 | - | 15.800 | 15.000 | - | - | 266.503 |
| 5 | David Belyavskiy | 15.066 | 14.933 | - | 14.966 | 14.366 | 14.500 | 266.503 |
| 5 | Nikita Ignatyev | 15.066 | - | 15.333 | 15.033 | 13.833 | 14.333 | 266.503 |
| 5 | Daniil Kazachkov | - | - | 15.258 | - | - | - | 266.503 |
| 5 | Nikolai Kuksenkov | - | 13.200 | - | - | 14.833 | 14.600 | 266.503 |
| 5 | Ivan Stretovich | - | 14.800 | - | - | - | - | 266.503 |
| 6 | Brazil | 44.699 (6) | 43.000 (5) | 44.466 (5) | 45.532 (4) | 43.199 (7) | 42.666 (7) | 263.562 |
| 6 | Francisco Barretto | - | 14.200 | 14.100 | - | 14.200 | 13.600 | 263.562 |
| 6 | Lucas Bitencourt | - | 14.200 | - | - | 14.333 | - | 263.562 |
| 6 | Diego Hypólito | 15.633 | - | - | 15.000 | - | - | 263.562 |
| 6 | Arthur Zanetti | - | - | 15.633 | - | - | - | 263.562 |
| 6 | Arthur Oyakawa Mariano | 14.533 | - | - | 14.966 | - | 14.066 | 263.562 |
| 6 | Sérgio Sasaki | 14.533 | 14.600 | 14.733 | 15.566 | 14.666 | 15.000 | 263.562 |
| 7 | Switzerland | 43.666 (7) | 42.957 (6) | 42.240 (8) | 44.133 (7) | 43.765 (6) | 40.532 (8) | 257.293 |
| 7 | Christian Baumann | - | 13.666 | 13.866 | - | - | 14.200 | 257.293 |
| 7 | Pascal Bucher | - | 14.566 | - | 14.400 | 15.033 | 12.866 | 257.293 |
| 7 | Benjamin Gischard | 14.600 | - | 13.966 | 14.600 | - | - | 257.293 |
| 7 | Oliver Hegi | - | 14.725 | - | - | 13.966 | 13.466 | 257.293 |
| 7 | Kevin Rossi | 14.266 | - | - | - | - | - | 257.293 |
| 7 | Eddy Yusof | 14.800 | - | 14.408 | 15.133 | 14.766 | - | 257.293 |
| 8 | Germany | 41.299 (8) | 39.765 (8) | 43.366 (7) | 42.466 (8) | 45.466 (3) | 43.798 (5) | 256.160 |
| 8 | Andreas Bretschneider | 13.800 | - | 14.133 | - | 14.900 | 14.166 | 256.160 |
| 8 | Lukas Dauser | - | - | - | 13.533 | 15.366 | - | 256.160 |
| 8 | Fabian Hambüchen | 15.166 | - | 14.633 | 14.033 | 15.200 | 15.366 | 256.160 |
| 8 | Helge Liebrich | - | 11.766 | - | 14.900 | - | - | 256.160 |
| 8 | Andreas Toba | 12.333 | 14.366 | 14.600 | - | - | 14.266 | 256.160 |
| 8 | Daniel Weinert | - | 13.633 | - | - | - | - | 256.160 |

=== Individual all-around ===
In the men's all-around final, only two gymnasts per country can compete. Ryohei Kato and Shogo Nonomura of Japan, Lin Chaopan of China, Max Whitlock and Daniel Keatings of Great Britain, and Nikita Ignatyev of Russia were among those who had earned scores in the qualification round high enough to qualify for the individual all-around final, but could not compete due to the two-per-country rule. On October 8, Nile Wilson withdrew from the all-around final due to a wrist injury, and his teammate, Max Whitlock, competed in his place. On that day, it was also announced that Alexander Shatilov of Israel had pulled out of the competition and would be replaced by reserve athlete Ferhat Arıcan of Turkey.

Kōhei Uchimura of Japan once again made history by winning his fifth consecutive World all-around title.

| Rank | Gymnast | Floor (gymnastics) | Pommel horse | Rings (gymnastics) | Vault (gymnastics) | Parallel bars | Horizontal bar | Total |
|---|---|---|---|---|---|---|---|---|
| 1st place, gold medalist(s) | Kōhei Uchimura (JPN) | 15.766 | 15.133 | 15.000 | 15.633 | 15.200 | 15.233 | 91.965 |
| 2nd place, silver medalist(s) | Max Whitlock (GBR) | 15.466 | 16.000 | 14.466 | 15.366 | 14.975 | 14.200 | 90.473 |
| 3rd place, bronze medalist(s) | Yusuke Tanaka (JPN) | 15.200 | 14.200 | 14.733 | 14.933 | 15.883 | 15.500 | 90.449 |
| 4 | Oleg Verniaiev (UKR) | 14.833 | 15.233 | 14.333 | 15.400 | 16.033 | 14.466 | 90.298 |
| 5 | David Belyavskiy (RUS) | 15.133 | 15.133 | 14.700 | 15.033 | 15.366 | 14.400 | 89.765 |
| 6 | Deng Shudi (CHN) | 15.300 | 13.833 | 14.866 | 15.200 | 15.700 | 14.833 | 89.732 |
| 7 | Sérgio Sasaki (BRA) | 14.966 | 14.633 | 14.800 | 15.200 | 14.900 | 15.066 | 89.565 |
| 8 | Fabian Hambüchen (GER) | 14.966 | 13.466 | 14.533 | 15.066 | 15.433 | 15.100 | 88.564 |
| 9 | Nikolai Kuksenkov (RUS) | 14.766 | 14.800 | 14.666 | 14.600 | 15.108 | 14.466 | 88.406 |
| 10 | Jossimar Calvo (COL) | 14.200 | 14.566 | 14.400 | 14.266 | 15.600 | 15.233 | 88.265 |
| 11 | Daniel Purvis (GBR) | 15.133 | 14.633 | 14.000 | 14.733 | 15.100 | 14.100 | 87.699 |
| 12 | Sam Mikulak (USA) | 15.300 | 14.800 | 14.800 | 14.633 | 13.400 | 14.658 | 87.591 |
| 13 | Cheng Ran (CHN) | 15.300 | 13.666 | 14.683 | 14.133 | 15.233 | 14.566 | 87.581 |
| 14 | Andrey Likhovitskiy (BLR) | 14.466 | 15.333 | 13.800 | 14.433 | 14.933 | 14.433 | 87.398 |
| 15 | Petro Pakhnyuk (AZE) | 14.433 | 14.366 | 13.966 | 14.966 | 15.375 | 13.933 | 87.039 |
| 16 | Andreas Toba (GER) | 14.466 | 14.166 | 14.633 | 14.333 | 14.333 | 14.333 | 86.264 |
| 17 | Donnell Whittenburg (USA) | 15.100 | 13.783 | 15.266 | 13.700 | 14.533 | 13.866 | 86.248 |
| 18 | Oliver Hegi (SUI) | 14.000 | 14.433 | 13.933 | 14.400 | 15.133 | 13.333 | 85.232 |
| 19 | Cristian Bățagă (ROU) | 14.566 | 14.100 | 14.466 | 14.566 | 14.133 | 13.366 | 85.197 |
| 20 | Cyril Tommasone (FRA) | 14.366 | 15.666 | 13.700 | 14.166 | 13.266 | 13.466 | 84.630 |
| 21 | Arthur Oyakawa Mariano (BRA) | 15.208 | 13.300 | 14.000 | 15.000 | 14.100 | 12.566 | 84.174 |
| 22 | Lee Hyeok-jung (KOR) | 14.366 | 13.000 | 13.433 | 14.366 | 14.233 | 13.766 | 83.164 |
| 23 | Ferhat Arıcan (TUR) | 12.566 | 14.133 | 13.666 | 14.366 | 14.200 | 13.533 | 82.464 |
| 24 | Ludovico Edalli (ITA) | 13.666 | 13.700 | 13.533 | 14.266 | 13.133 | 13.966 | 82.264 |

=== Floor ===
2011 World champion and 2013 bronze medalist on floor Kohei Uchimura qualified in 5th, but did not progress to the final because his Japanese teammates Kenzo Shirai and Ryohei Kato qualified ahead of him.

| Position | Gymnast | D Score | E Score | Penalty | Total |
|---|---|---|---|---|---|
| 1st place, gold medalist(s) | Denis Ablyazin (RUS) | 7.100 | 8.650 | | 15.750 |
| 2nd place, silver medalist(s) | Kenzo Shirai (JPN) | 7.400 | 8.433 | 0.1 | 15.733 |
| 3rd place, bronze medalist(s) | Diego Hypólito (BRA) | 7.000 | 8.700 | | 15.700 |
| 4 | Jacob Dalton (USA) | 6.700 | 8.900 | | 15.600 |
| 5 | Kim Han-sol (KOR) | 6.500 | 9.000 | | 15.500 |
| 6 | Ryohei Kato (JPN) | 7.100 | 8.366 | | 15.466 |
| 7 | Eleftherios Kosmidis (GRE) | 6.600 | 8.550 | 0.1 | 15.050 |
| 8 | Rayderley Zapata (ESP) | 6.600 | 7.300 | | 13.900 |

=== Pommel Horse ===
After failing to make the finals in Antwerp in 2013, 2011 World and 2012 Olympic champion Krisztián Berki reclaimed his title on his specialty.

| Position | Gymnast | D Score | E Score | Penalty | Total |
|---|---|---|---|---|---|
| 1st place, gold medalist(s) | Krisztián Berki (HUN) | 7.000 | 9.033 | | 16.033 |
| 2nd place, silver medalist(s) | Filip Ude (CRO) | 6.700 | 9.083 | | 15.783 |
| 3rd place, bronze medalist(s) | Cyril Tommasone (FRA) | 6.900 | 8.700 | | 15.600 |
| 4 | Sašo Bertoncelj (SLO) | 6.700 | 8.833 | | 15.533 |
| 5 | Robert Seligman (CRO) | 6.400 | 9.000 | | 15.400 |
| 6 | Alexander Naddour (USA) | 6.800 | 8.500 | | 15.300 |
| 7 | Andrey Likhovitskiy (BLR) | 6.500 | 8.700 | | 15.200 |
| 8 | Daniel Keatings (GBR) | 7.100 | 8.033 | | 15.133 |

=== Rings ===
Reigning Olympic and defending World champion Arthur Zanetti was edged out by newcomer Liu Yang by 0.200.

| Position | Gymnast | D Score | E Score | Penalty | Total |
|---|---|---|---|---|---|
| 1st place, gold medalist(s) | Liu Yang (CHN) | 6.900 | 9.033 | | 15.933 |
| 2nd place, silver medalist(s) | Arthur Zanetti (BRA) | 6.800 | 8.933 | | 15.733 |
| 3rd place, bronze medalist(s) | You Hao (CHN) | 7.000 | 8.700 | | 15.700 |
| 3rd place, bronze medalist(s) | Denis Ablyazin (RUS) | 6.800 | 8.900 | | 15.700 |
| 5 | Samir Aït Saïd (FRA) | 6.800 | 8.766 | | 15.566 |
| 6 | Courtney Tulloch (GBR) | 6.800 | 8.600 | | 15.400 |
| 6 | Eleftherios Petrounias (GRE) | 6.700 | 8.700 | | 15.400 |
| 8 | Nikita Ignatyev (RUS) | 6.600 | 8.666 | | 15.266 |

=== Vault ===
Reigning Olympic and 2-time World champion Yang Hak-Seon failed to defend his title or even make the podium because he fell on both of his vaults. The 2007 World bronze medalist Ri Se-Gwang grabbed his first world title. Only Yang Hak-Seon and Ri Se-Gwang attempted two top 6.4 difficulty vaults with the former failing at both the Yang Hak Seon on vault and Tsukahara 3½, and latter succeeding in the Ri Se Gwang and Ri Se Gwang 2 on vault. Yang was trying to successfully complete the Tsukahara 3½ to become his second eponymous skill on men's vault, but since he fell on landing, his attempt was only credited for its difficulty score and not his name. Yang was the top qualifier, despite using two 6.0-difficulty vaults in qualifying before increasing them to two 6.4s in the final. Gwang used own 6.4s in all rounds. Shirai's lower difficulty of 5.6 of his second vault, which was also the only vault performed in the finals with a difficulty less than 6.0, was a contributor significant enough to miss him a spot on the podium here as he only trailed American Jacob Dalton in an average combined score by just 0.137, a deduction on landing equivalent to a small step.

| Rank | Gymnast | D Score | E Score | Pen. | Score 1 | D Score | E Score | Pen. | Score 2 | Total |
|---|---|---|---|---|---|---|---|---|---|---|
| 1st place, gold medalist(s) | Ri Se-gwang (PRK) | 6.400 | 9.233 | | 15.633 | 6.400 | 9.100 | 0.3 | 15.200 | 15.416 |
| 2nd place, silver medalist(s) | Ihor Radivilov (UKR) | 6.000 | 9.200 | | 15.200 | 6.000 | 9.466 | | 15.466 | 15.333 |
| 3rd place, bronze medalist(s) | Jacob Dalton (USA) | 6.000 | 9.233 | 0.1 | 15.133 | 6.000 | 9.266 | | 15.266 | 15.199 |
| 4 | Kenzo Shirai (JPN) | 6.000 | 9.058 | | 15.058 | 5.600 | 9.466 | | 15.066 | 15.062 |
| 5 | Sérgio Sasaki (BRA) | 6.000 | 9.166 | 0.1 | 15.066 | 6.000 | 9.066 | 0.1 | 14.966 | 15.016 |
| 6 | Shek Wai Hung (HKG) | 6.000 | 9.166 | 0.1 | 15.066 | 6.000 | 9.033 | 0.1 | 14.933 | 14.999 |
| 7 | Yang Hak-seon (KOR) | 6.400 | 8.166 | 0.1 | 14.466 | 6.400 | 8.066 | 0.1 | 14.366 | 14.416 |
| 8 | Denis Ablyazin (RUS) | 6.000 | 8.133 | | 14.133 | 6.200 | 8.000 | 0.1 | 14.100 | 14.116 |

=== Parallel bars ===
Reigning World champion Lin Chaopan of China failed to qualify for the final, placing 17th in qualifications. Former World champion Kōhei Uchimura failed to qualify due to the two-per-country rule, with his teammates Ryohei Kato and Yusuke Tanaka qualifying ahead of him.

| Position | Gymnast | D Score | E Score | Penalty | Total |
|---|---|---|---|---|---|
| 1st place, gold medalist(s) | Oleg Verniaiev (UKR) | 6.900 | 9.225 | | 16.125 |
| 2nd place, silver medalist(s) | Danell Leyva (USA) | 6.900 | 9.033 | | 15.933 |
| 3rd place, bronze medalist(s) | Ryohei Kato (JPN) | 6.700 | 8.966 | | 15.666 |
| 4 | Deng Shudi (CHN) | 7.100 | 8.533 | | 15.633 |
| 5 | Yusuke Tanaka (JPN) | 6.200 | 8.841 | | 15.041 |
| 6 | Cheng Ran (CHN) | 6.800 | 8.066 | | 14.866 |
| 7 | Donnell Whittenburg (USA) | 6.100 | 8.266 | | 14.366 |
| 8 | Nikolai Kuksenkov (RUS) | 6.500 | 7.166 | | 13.666 |

=== Horizontal bar ===
Reigning Olympic and defending World champion Epke Zonderland successfully took home the gold on horizontal bar. 2013 World silver medalist Fabian Hambüchen failed to qualify. He finished in 22nd place with a score of 14.366.

| Position | Gymnast | D Score | E Score | Penalty | Total |
|---|---|---|---|---|---|
| 1st place, gold medalist(s) | Epke Zonderland (NED) | 7.700 | 8.525 | | 16.225 |
| 2nd place, silver medalist(s) | Kōhei Uchimura (JPN) | 7.200 | 8.525 | | 15.725 |
| 3rd place, bronze medalist(s) | Marijo Možnik (CRO) | 6.700 | 8.300 | | 15.000 |
| 4 | Nile Wilson (GBR) | 6.200 | 8.566 | | 14.766 |
| 5 | David Belyavskiy (RUS) | 6.400 | 8.333 | | 14.733 |
| 6 | Nikolai Kuksenkov (RUS) | 6.900 | 7.633 | | 14.533 |
| 7 | Zhang Chenglong (CHN) | 7.400 | 6.966 | | 14.366 |
| 8 | Jossimar Calvo (COL) | 6.700 | 6.600 | | 13.300 |

== Women's results ==
=== Team competition ===
| Rank | Team | Vault (gymnastics) | Uneven bars | Balance beam | Floor (gymnastics) | Total |
|---|---|---|---|---|---|---|
| 1st place, gold medalist(s) | United States | 46.741 (1) | 44.733 (1) | 43.799 (3) | 44.007 (1) | 179.280 |
| 1st place, gold medalist(s) | Kyla Ross | 15.100 | 14.733 | 14.333 | 13.966 | 179.280 |
| 1st place, gold medalist(s) | Simone Biles | 15.866 | | 14.966 | 15.375 | 179.280 |
| 1st place, gold medalist(s) | Mykayla Skinner | 15.775 | | | 14.666 | 179.280 |
| 1st place, gold medalist(s) | Ashton Locklear | | 15.100 | | | 179.280 |
| 1st place, gold medalist(s) | Madison Kocian | | 14.900 | | | 179.280 |
| 1st place, gold medalist(s) | Alyssa Baumann | | | 14.500 | | 179.280 |
| 2nd place, silver medalist(s) | China | 44.123 (4) | 43.599 (3) | 44.066 (1) | 40.799 (5) | 172.587 |
| 2nd place, silver medalist(s) | Yao Jinnan | 14.966 | 14.533 | 14.400 | | 172.587 |
| 2nd place, silver medalist(s) | Shang Chunsong | | 13.933 | 15.066 | 14.033 | 172.587 |
| 2nd place, silver medalist(s) | Huang Huidan | | 15.133 | 14.600 | | 172.587 |
| 2nd place, silver medalist(s) | Tan Jiaxin | 14.991 | | | 13.900 | 172.587 |
| 2nd place, silver medalist(s) | Chen Siyi | 14.166 | | | 12.866 | 172.587 |
| 2nd place, silver medalist(s) | Bai Yawen | | | | | 172.587 |
| 3rd place, bronze medalist(s) | Russia | 44.699 (3) | 44.655 (2) | 41.932 (5) | 40.166 (7) | 171.462 |
| 3rd place, bronze medalist(s) | Aliya Mustafina | 15.133 | 15.066 | 14.766 | 14.033 | 171.462 |
| 3rd place, bronze medalist(s) | Maria Kharenkova | | | 15.033 | 13.233 | 171.462 |
| 3rd place, bronze medalist(s) | Alla Sosnitskaya | 14.633 | | | 12.900 | 171.462 |
| 3rd place, bronze medalist(s) | Ekaterina Kramarenko | | 14.633 | 12.133 | | 171.462 |
| 3rd place, bronze medalist(s) | Daria Spiridonova | | 14.966 | | | 171.462 |
| 3rd place, bronze medalist(s) | Tatiana Nabieva | 14.933 | | | | 171.462 |
| 4 | Romania | 44.757 (2) | 40.232 (8) | 43.900 (2) | 42.074 (3) | 170.963 |
| 4 | Larisa Iordache | 15.066 | 14.466 | 15.500 | 14.708 | 170.963 |
| 4 | Ștefania Stănilă | 14.758 | 12.933 | 13.200 | 13.666 | 170.963 |
| 4 | Andreea Munteanu | | | 15.200 | 13.700 | 170.963 |
| 4 | Anamaria Ocolișan | 14.933 | | | | 170.963 |
| 4 | Paula Tudorache | | 12.833 | | | 170.963 |
| 4 | Silvia Zarzu | | | | | 170.963 |
| 5 | Italy | 43.900 (6) | 41.391 (6) | 41.066 (6) | 42.666 (2) | 169.023 |
| 5 | Vanessa Ferrari | 14.900 | 14.066 | 14.300 | 14.666 | 169.023 |
| 5 | Erika Fasana | 14.900 | | | 14.200 | 169.023 |
| 5 | Lara Mori | | 13.825 | | 13.800 | 169.023 |
| 5 | Giorgia Campana | | 13.500 | 12.933 | | 169.023 |
| 5 | Martina Rizzelli | 14.100 | | | | 169.023 |
| 5 | Lavinia Marongiu | | | 13.833 | | 169.023 |
| 6 | Great Britain | 44.032 (5) | 43.232 (4) | 39.632 (8) | 41.599 (4) | 168.495 |
| 6 | Ruby Harrold | 14.800 | 14.066 | | 13.700 | 168.495 |
| 6 | Gabrielle Jupp | | 14.066 | 13.833 | 13.366 | 168.495 |
| 6 | Becky Downie | | 15.100 | 14.033 | | 168.495 |
| 6 | Claudia Fragapane | 14.466 | | | 14.533 | 168.495 |
| 6 | Kelly Simm | 14.766 | | | | 168.495 |
| 6 | Hannah Whelan | | | 11.766 | | 168.495 |
| 7 | Australia | 42.132 (8) | 42.700 (5) | 42.165 (4) | 38.991 (8) | 165.988 |
| 7 | Georgia Rose Brown | 14.233 | 13.900 | 13.766 | 12.900 | 165.988 |
| 7 | Mary Anne Monckton | 13.933 | | 14.333 | | 165.988 |
| 7 | Larrissa Miller | | 14.700 | | 13.300 | 165.988 |
| 7 | Olivia Vivian | | 14.100 | | 12.791 | 165.988 |
| 7 | Kiara Munteanu | 13.966 | | | | 165.988 |
| 7 | Emma Nedov | | | 14.066 | | 165.988 |
| 8 | Japan | 43.166 (7) | 41.124 (7) | 40.866 (7) | 40.266 (6) | 165.422 |
| 8 | Mai Murakami | 14.566 | 13.400 | | 13.700 | 165.422 |
| 8 | Asuka Teramoto | 14.300 | 14.266 | 12.866 | | 165.422 |
| 8 | Yu Minobe | | 13.458 | 14.100 | | 165.422 |
| 8 | Natsumi Sasada | | | 13.900 | 13.533 | 165.422 |
| 8 | Wakana Inoue | 14.300 | | | | 165.422 |
| 8 | Azumi Ishikura | | | | 13.033 | 165.422 |

=== Individual all-around ===
Only two athletes per country are allowed to compete in this event. The following athletes scored enough to qualify for the individual all-around final but did not compete due to the two-per-country rule: Mykayla Skinner of the United States (6th), Madison Kocian of the United States (14th), and Ekaterina Kramarenko of Russia (15th).

Simone Biles successfully defended her title. Larisa Iordache gave Romania its first medal of the 2014 Worlds with a silver. 2013 World all-around silver medalist Kyla Ross took the bronze. Russia's Aliya Mustafina placed fourth, not making the podium for only the second time in her senior career after falling on floor.

| Rank | Gymnast | Vault (gymnastics) | Uneven bars | Balance beam | Floor (gymnastics) | Total |
|---|---|---|---|---|---|---|
| 1st place, gold medalist(s) | Simone Biles (USA) | 15.866 | 14.533 | 14.766 | 15.066 | 60.231 |
| 2nd place, silver medalist(s) | Larisa Iordache (ROU) | 15.066 | 14.866 | 15.100 | 14.733 | 59.765 |
| 3rd place, bronze medalist(s) | Kyla Ross (USA) | 15.166 | 14.700 | 14.433 | 13.933 | 58.232 |
| 4 | Aliya Mustafina (RUS) | 15.100 | 15.041 | 14.341 | 13.433 | 57.915 |
| 5 | Yao Jinnan (CHN) | 14.533 | 15.533 | 14.566 | 12.833 | 57.465 |
| 6 | Vanessa Ferrari (ITA) | 14.866 | 13.700 | 13.900 | 14.700 | 57.166 |
| 7 | Alla Sosnitskaya (RUS) | 14.833 | 13.933 | 13.500 | 13.900 | 56.166 |
| 8 | Jessica López (VEN) | 14.400 | 14.500 | 14.133 | 13.100 | 56.133 |
| 9 | Elsabeth Black (CAN) | 13.900 | 13.833 | 14.533 | 13.866 | 56.132 |
| 10 | Claudia Fragapane (GBR) | 14.600 | 13.066 | 14.166 | 14.266 | 56.098 |
| 11 | Ruby Harrold (GBR) | 14.683 | 14.400 | 13.066 | 13.466 | 55.615 |
| 12 | Shang Chunsong (CHN) | 14.000 | 12.300 | 15.033 | 14.166 | 55.499 |
| 13 | Roxana Popa (ESP) | 14.900 | 14.300 | 13.066 | 13.033 | 55.299 |
| 14 | Marta Pihan-Kulesza (POL) | 13.966 | 13.691 | 14.133 | 13.366 | 55.156 |
| 15 | Giulia Steingruber (SUI) | 15.033 | 12.633 | 13.833 | 13.633 | 55.132 |
| 16 | Ana Filipa Martins (POR) | 13.800 | 13.966 | 13.533 | 13.433 | 54.732 |
| 17 | Erika Fasana (ITA) | 14.500 | 13.300 | 13.466 | 12.733 | 53.999 |
| 18 | Asuka Teramoto (JPN) | 13.766 | 13.766 | 12.866 | 13.466 | 53.864 |
| 19 | Ștefania Stănilă (ROU) | 14.500 | 12.733 | 12.700 | 13.600 | 53.533 |
| 20 | Natsumi Sasada (JPN) | 14.000 | 13.233 | 12.700 | 13.233 | 53.166 |
| 21 | Georgia Rose Brown (AUS) | 14.066 | 12.300 | 13.500 | 12.966 | 52.832 |
| 22 | Lisa Katharina Hill (GER) | 14.033 | 13.633 | 11.366 | 13.166 | 52.198 |
| 23 | Elsa García (MEX) | 13.933 | 11.266 | 13.766 | 13.066 | 52.031 |
| 24 | Laura Waem (BEL) | 13.900 | 13.800 | 13.633 | 10.633 | 51.966 |

=== Vault ===
Reigning 2011 and 2013 World champion McKayla Maroney missed the competition to recover from a knee injury. She was the only 2013 World champion not to compete in Nanning. 2008 Olympic champion and 2013 World bronze medalist Hong Un-jong claimed her first world title on vault, the first North Korean World champion since Kim Gwang-Suk in 1991. Simone Biles claimed silver again as she did in 2013, and Mykayla Skinner grabbed her first individual medal, a bronze.

| Rank | Gymnast | D Score | E Score | Pen. | Score 1 | D Score | E Score | Pen. | Score 2 | Total |
|---|---|---|---|---|---|---|---|---|---|---|
| 1st place, gold medalist(s) | Hong Un-jong (PRK) | 6.300 | 9.466 | | 15.766 | 6.400 | 9.033 | | 15.433 | 15.599 |
| 2nd place, silver medalist(s) | Simone Biles (USA) | 6.300 | 9.600 | | 15.900 | 5.600 | 9.608 | | 15.208 | 15.554 |
| 3rd place, bronze medalist(s) | Mykayla Skinner (USA) | 6.400 | 9.300 | | 15.700 | 5.800 | 9.233 | | 15.033 | 15.366 |
| 4 | Alla Sosnitskaya (RUS) | 6.400 | 8.866 | 0.3 | 14.966 | 5.800 | 9.166 | | 14.966 | 14.966 |
| 5 | Giulia Steingruber (SUI) | 6.200 | 9.033 | | 15.233 | 5.000 | 9.200 | | 14.200 | 14.716 |
| 5 | Claudia Fragapane (GBR) | 5.800 | 9.033 | | 14.833 | 5.600 | 9.000 | | 14.600 | 14.716 |
| 7 | Alexa Moreno (MEX) | 6.200 | 8.833 | | 15.033 | 6.000 | 8.366 | 0.3 | 14.066 | 14.549 |
| 8 | Phan Thị Hà Thanh (VIE) | 5.800 | 8.608 | 0.3 | 14.108 | 6.200 | 8.533 | 0.1 | 14.633 | 14.370 |

=== Uneven bars ===
Due to the two-per-country rule, Tan Jiaxin of China and Ekaterina Kramarenko of Russia were not able to compete in the final due to other members of their national team qualifying ahead of them. 2013 World champion Huang Huidan settled for the silver by 0.067 to her compatriot Yao Jinnan, who claimed her first World championship gold medal. 2014 European bronze medalist Daria Spiridonova grabbed another bronze at her first World Championships, edging out Ashton Locklear by 0.017.

| Position | Gymnast | D Score | E Score | Penalty | Total |
|---|---|---|---|---|---|
| 1st place, gold medalist(s) | Yao Jinnan (CHN) | 6.900 | 8.733 | | 15.633 |
| 2nd place, silver medalist(s) | Huang Huidan (CHN) | 6.800 | 8.766 | | 15.566 |
| 3rd place, bronze medalist(s) | Daria Spiridonova (RUS) | 6.400 | 8.883 | | 15.283 |
| 4 | Ashton Locklear (USA) | 6.500 | 8.766 | | 15.266 |
| 5 | Becky Downie (GBR) | 6.600 | 8.566 | | 15.166 |
| 6 | Aliya Mustafina (RUS) | 6.300 | 8.800 | | 15.100 |
| 7 | Lisa Katharina Hill (GER) | 6.300 | 8.033 | | 14.333 |
| 8 | Ruby Harrold (GBR) | 6.100 | 7.566 | | 13.666 |

=== Balance beam ===
Due to the two-per-country rule, Shang Chunsong and Huang Huidan of China were not able to compete in the final as they qualified behind teammates Yao Jinnan and Bai Yawen. 2013 World champion Aliya Mustafina of Russia had a hiccup in her routine and did not complete a required acrobatic series, and despite a 0.5 deduction, claimed the bronze over Asuka Teramoto of Japan by 0.066. 2013 World bronze medalist Simone Biles claimed her third gold medal of the competition on beam, 0.067 over silver medalist Bai Yawen of China.

| Position | Gymnast | D Score | E Score | Penalty | Total |
|---|---|---|---|---|---|
| 1st place, gold medalist(s) | Simone Biles (USA) | 6.400 | 8.700 | | 15.100 |
| 2nd place, silver medalist(s) | Bai Yawen (CHN) | 6.200 | 8.833 | | 15.033 |
| 3rd place, bronze medalist(s) | Aliya Mustafina (RUS) | 5.500 | 8.666 | | 14.166 |
| 4 | Asuka Teramoto (JPN) | 5.600 | 8.500 | | 14.100 |
| 5 | Larisa Iordache (ROU) | 6.200 | 7.866 | | 14.066 |
| 6 | Kyla Ross (USA) | 5.600 | 8.266 | | 13.866 |
| 7 | Elsabeth Black (CAN) | 6.300 | 7.400 | | 13.700 |
| 8 | Yao Jinnan (CHN) | 5.700 | 7.666 | | 13.366 |

=== Floor ===
Simone Biles successfully defended her title from 2013, her fourth gold medal in Nanning and ninth overall. 2013 World bronze medalist Larisa Iordache grabbed the silver, and 2012 Olympic Floor bronze medalist Aliya Mustafina edged out Mykayla Skinner by 0.033 to claim the bronze, her 11th medal overall.

| Position | Gymnast | D Score | E Score | Penalty | Total |
|---|---|---|---|---|---|
| 1st place, gold medalist(s) | Simone Biles (USA) | 6.400 | 8.933 | | 15.333 |
| 2nd place, silver medalist(s) | Larisa Iordache (ROU) | 6.300 | 8.500 | | 14.800 |
| 3rd place, bronze medalist(s) | Aliya Mustafina (RUS) | 6.200 | 8.533 | | 14.733 |
| 4 | Mykayla Skinner (USA) | 6.500 | 8.200 | | 14.700 |
| 5 | Vanessa Ferrari (ITA) | 6.300 | 8.366 | | 14.666 |
| 6 | Larrissa Miller (AUS) | 5.800 | 8.433 | | 14.233 |
| 7 | Erika Fasana (ITA) | 5.700 | 8.200 | | 13.900 |
| 8 | Claudia Fragapane (GBR) | 6.000 | 7.400 | 0.3 | 13.100 |
