= Yoshima Suga =

Japanese wrestler

Personal information
- Nationality: Japanese
- Born: 2 January 1947 (age 79)

Sport
- Sport: Wrestling

Yoshima Suga (菅 芳松, Suga Yoshima; born 2 January 1947) is a Japanese wrestler. He competed in the men's Greco-Roman 57 kg at the 1976 Summer Olympics.
