= Guangxi Gymnasium =

Sports venue in Nanning, Guangxi, China

- Full name: Guangxi Sports Center Gymnasium
- Location: Nanning, China
- Capacity: 9,247
- Surface: 2982 square meters

Construction
- Opened: 2012

Tenant
- International Gymnastics Federation (Oct 2014)

Guangxi Gymnasium is an indoor sporting arena located in Nanning, China. The capacity of the arena will be 9,247 spectators and opened in 2012. It hosts indoor sporting events such as basketball and volleyball. It hosted the 2014 World Artistic Gymnastics Championships

== See also ==
- List of indoor arenas in China
