= Aliya Mustafina =

Russian artistic gymnast (born 1994)

Aliya Mustafina Алия Мустафина
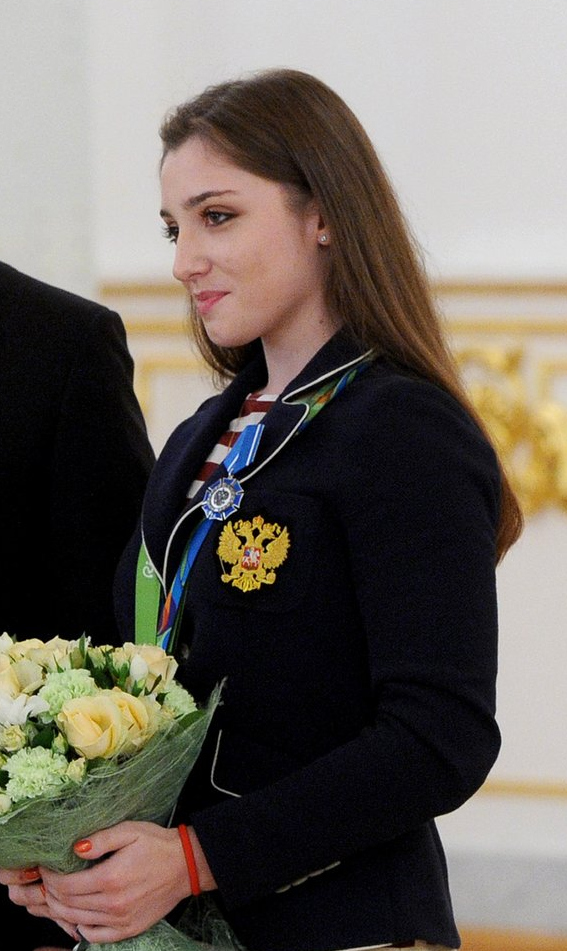
- Mustafina in August 2017

Personal information
- Full name: Aliya Farkhatovna Mustafina
- Born: 30 September 1994 (age 31) Yegoryevsk, Russia
- Height: 1.62 m (5 ft 4 in)
- Spouse: Alexey Zaitsev (m. 2016; div. 2018)

Gymnastics career
- Discipline: Women's artistic gymnastics
- Country represented: Russia (2007–2021)
- Club: CSKA Moscow
- Gym: Ozero Krugloye
- Head coaches: Sergei Starkin; Raisa Ganina; Olga Sikorro; Sergei Zelikson; Evgeny Grebenkin
- Former coaches: Dina Kamalova; Alexander Alexandrov
- Choreographer: Olga Burova
- Eponymous skills: Uneven Bars: 1½-twisting double back tuck dismount Floor Exercise: 3/1 turn with leg held up in 180° split
- Retired: June 8, 2021
Medal record
Women's artistic gymnastics
Representing Russia
Event	1st	2nd	3rd
Olympic Games	2	2	3
World Championships	3	4	5
European Games	3	1	0
European Championships	5	4	3
Summer Universiade	3	1	0
Total	16	12	11
Olympic Games
Gold medal – first place	2012 London	Uneven bars
Gold medal – first place	2016 Rio de Janeiro	Uneven bars
Silver medal – second place	2012 London	Team
Silver medal – second place	2016 Rio de Janeiro	Team
Bronze medal – third place	2012 London	All-around
Bronze medal – third place	2012 London	Floor exercise
Bronze medal – third place	2016 Rio de Janeiro	All-around
World Championships
Gold medal – first place	2010 Rotterdam	Team
Gold medal – first place	2010 Rotterdam	All-around
Gold medal – first place	2013 Antwerp	Balance beam
Silver medal – second place	2010 Rotterdam	Vault
Silver medal – second place	2010 Rotterdam	Uneven bars
Silver medal – second place	2010 Rotterdam	Floor exercise
Silver medal – second place	2018 Doha	Team
Bronze medal – third place	2013 Antwerp	All-around
Bronze medal – third place	2013 Antwerp	Uneven bars
Bronze medal – third place	2014 Nanning	Team
Bronze medal – third place	2014 Nanning	Balance beam
Bronze medal – third place	2014 Nanning	Floor exercise
European Games
Gold medal – first place	2015 Baku	Team
Gold medal – first place	2015 Baku	All-around
Gold medal – first place	2015 Baku	Uneven bars
Silver medal – second place	2015 Baku	Floor exercise
European Championships
Gold medal – first place	2010 Birmingham	Team
Gold medal – first place	2013 Moscow	All-around
Gold medal – first place	2013 Moscow	Uneven bars
Gold medal – first place	2016 Bern	Team
Gold medal – first place	2016 Bern	Balance beam
Silver medal – second place	2010 Birmingham	Uneven bars
Silver medal – second place	2010 Birmingham	Balance beam
Silver medal – second place	2012 Brussels	Team
Silver medal – second place	2014 Sofia	Uneven bars
Bronze medal – third place	2014 Sofia	Team
Bronze medal – third place	2014 Sofia	Balance beam
Bronze medal – third place	2016 Bern	Uneven bars
Summer Universiade
Gold medal – first place	2013 Kazan	Team
Gold medal – first place	2013 Kazan	All-around
Gold medal – first place	2013 Kazan	Uneven bars
Silver medal – second place	2013 Kazan	Balance beam
FIG World Cup
Event	1st	2nd	3rd
All-Around World Cup	1	1	0
World Cup	0	1	0
World Challenge Cup	3	0	0
Total	4	2	0

Aliya Farkhatovna Mustafina (Russian: Алия Фархатовна Мустафина; born 30 September 1994) is a Russian former artistic gymnast.

She was the 2010 all-around world champion, the 2013 European all around champion, the 2012 and 2016 Olympic uneven bars champion and a seven-time Olympic medalist. Mustafina has tied with Svetlana Khorkina for the most Olympic medals won by a Russian gymnast (not including Soviet Union women's national artistic gymnastics team). She was the ninth gymnast to win medals on every event at the World Championship.

At the 2012 Summer Olympics, Mustafina won four medals, making her the most decorated gymnast of the competition and the most decorated athlete in any sport except swimming. At the 2016 Summer Olympics, she became the first female gymnast since 2000 to win an all-around medal in two consecutive Olympics, and the first since Svetlana Khorkina (also in 2000) to defend her title in an Olympic apparatus final.

== Early life ==
Mustafina was born in Yegoryevsk, Russia, on 30 September 1994. Her father, Farhat Mustafin, a Volga Tatar born in Nizhny Novgorod Oblast Mishar village Bolshoye Rybushkino, was a bronze medalist in Greco-Roman wrestling at the 1976 Summer Olympics, and her mother, Yelena Kuznetsova, an ethnic Russian, is a physics teacher.

== Junior career ==
=== 2007 ===
Mustafina's first major international competition was the International Gymnix in Montreal in March 2007. She placed second in the all-around with a score of 58.825. The following month, she competed at the Stella Zakharova Cup in Kyiv and placed second in the all-around with a score of 55.150.

In September 2007, Mustafina competed at the Japan Junior International in Yokohama. She placed second in the all-around with a score of 59.800 and second in all four event finals, scoring 14.750 on vault, 15.250 on uneven bars, 15.450 on balance beam, and 14.100 on floor exercise.

=== 2008 ===
At the 2008 European Women's Artistic Gymnastics Championships in Clermont-Ferrand, France, Mustafina helped the Russian junior team finish in first place and won the silver medal in the individual all-around with a score of 60.300. In event finals, she placed fourth on uneven bars, scoring 14.475, and fourth on floor, scoring 14.375.

In November, she competed in the senior division at the Massilia Cup in Marseille. She placed sixth in the all-around with a score of 57.300; fourth on vault, scoring 13.950; and second on floor, scoring 14.925.

=== 2009 ===
Mustafina competed in the senior division at the Russian national championships in Bryansk in March, and won the all-around with a score of 58.550. She also placed second on uneven bars, scoring 15.300; first on balance beam, scoring 14.950; and third on floor, scoring 14.700. The new Russian head coach, Alexander Alexandrov, lamented the fact that "girls of that age cannot compete at senior international competitions".

She competed twice over the summer, placing second in the all-around (58.250) at the Japan Cup in Tokyo in July and winning the all-around (59.434) in the senior division at the Russian Cup in Penza in August. In December, she won the all-around at the Gymnasiade competition in Doha, Qatar, with a score of 57.350, and went on to place second on vault (13.900), first on uneven bars (14.825), first on balance beam (14.175), and first on floor (14.575).

== Senior career ==
=== 2010 ===
Mustafina was injured during a training session in March and was unable to compete in the Russian national championships.

In April, she competed at an Artistic Gymnastics World Cup event in Paris. She placed fourth on uneven bars after an error, scoring 14.500, and second on balance beam, scoring 14.175. At the end of the month, she competed at the 2010 European Championships in Birmingham, where she contributed an all-around score of 58.175 toward the Russian team's first-place finish and placed second on uneven bars, scoring 15.050; second on balance beam, scoring 14.375; and eighth on floor, scoring 13.225.

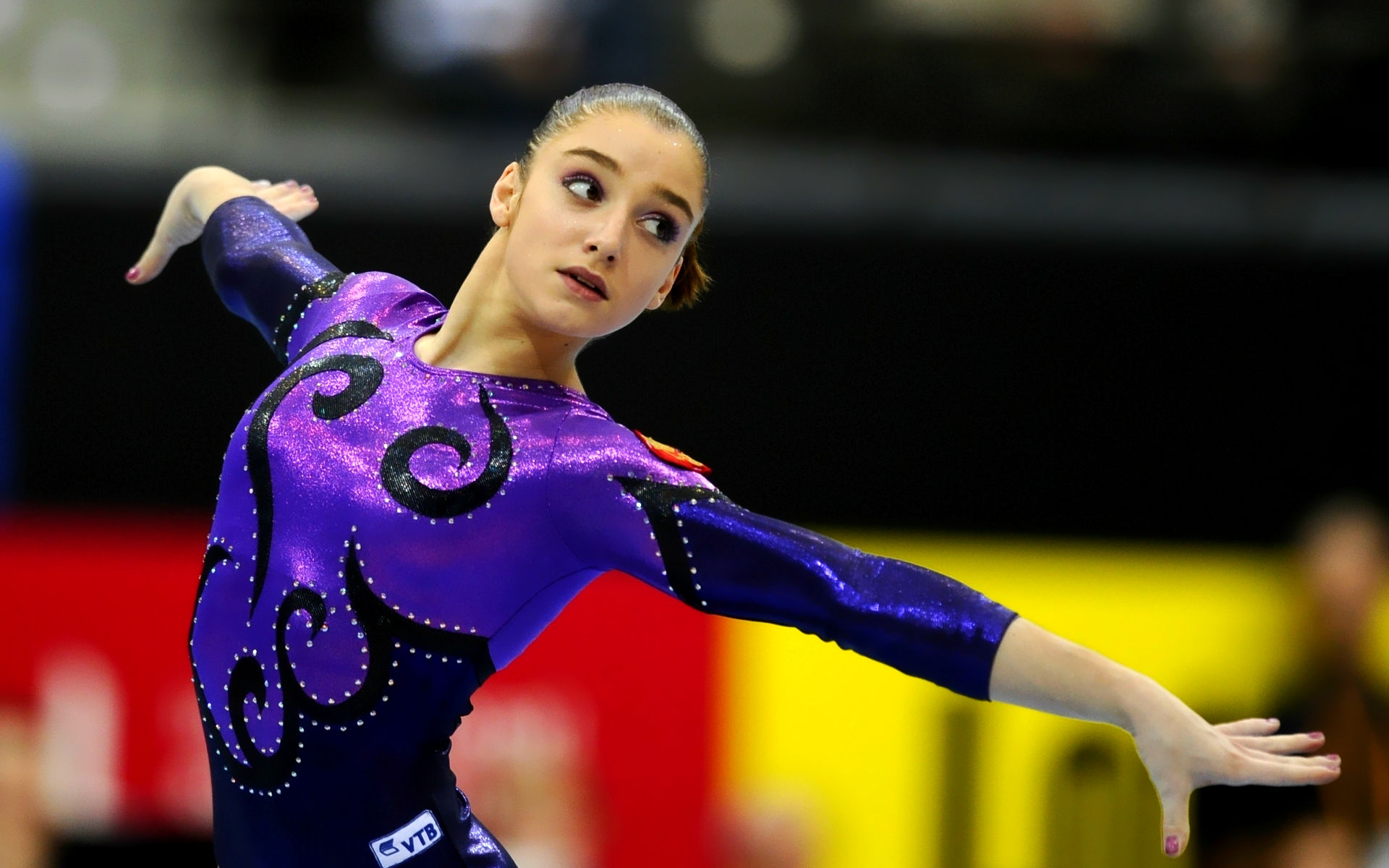
Mustafina at the 2010 World Artistic Gymnastics Championships

At the Russian Cup in Chelyabinsk in August, Mustafina won the all-around competition with a score of 62.271. In event finals, she placed second on vault, scoring 13.963; first on uneven bars, scoring 14.775; third on balance beam, scoring 14.850; and first on floor, scoring 15.300.

In October, she competed at the 2010 World Artistic Gymnastics Championships in Rotterdam and made history by qualifying for the all-around final and all four event finals—the first gymnast to do so since Shannon Miller and Svetlana Khorkina in 1996. She contributed an all-around score of 60.932 toward the Russian team's first-place finish and won the individual all-around with a score of 61.032. In event finals, she placed second on vault, scoring 15.066; second on uneven bars, scoring 15.600; seventh on balance beam, scoring 13.766 after a fall; and second on floor, scoring 14.766. She left Rotterdam with five medals, more than any other artistic gymnast, male or female. Andy Thornton wrote for Universal Sports:

The story behind Aliya Mustafina's all-around gold today is that of a revived dynasty; the dominant Soviet women's team of the 1980s and early 1990s—whom many consider to represent the absolute epitome of artistic gymnastics—was dead and now reborn. In addition to leading her teammates to their country's first world title as an independent nation, Mustafina has delivered one of the great performances by a female gymnast ever—capturing the very same artistry, difficulty, and competitive composure that made her Soviet predecessors so beloved and revered. Mustafina's four-event arsenal is so well balanced it's hard to pick a favorite event to watch her on, and a win so convincing and undeniable as hers gives a satisfying sense of closure to a competition. She has established herself and her Russian teammates as the absolute gymnasts to watch over the next two years—and the gymnasts to beat.

In November, Mustafina competed in the Italian Grand Prix in Cagliari, Sardinia. She placed fourth on uneven bars, scoring 13.570, and first on balance beam, scoring 14.700.

=== 2011 ===
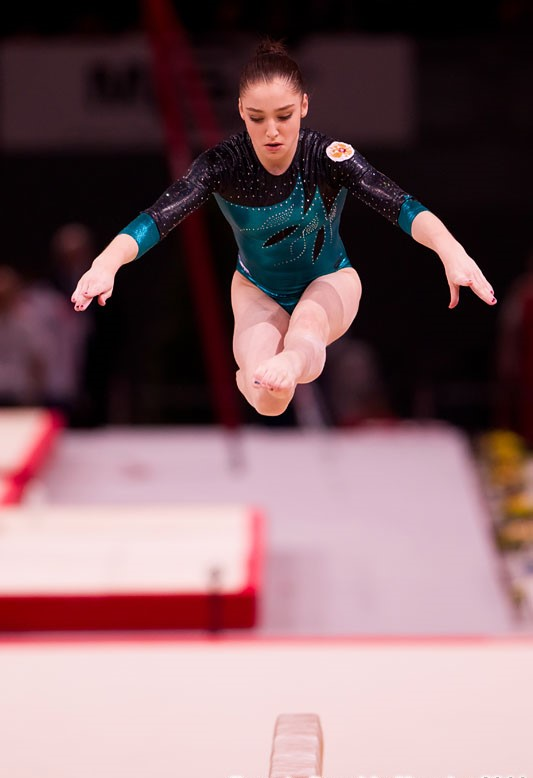
Mustafina at an Artistic Gymnastics World Cup event in Paris in 2011.

Mustafina competed at the American Cup in Jacksonville, Florida, in March. She finished in a controversial second to American Jordyn Wieber, with an all-around score of 59.831, after leading for three-quarters of the competition but falling on floor exercise, the last event. Later that month, she placed second on vault at a World Cup event in Paris, scoring 14.433; first on uneven bars, scoring 15.833; and first on balance beam, scoring 15.333.

In April, she competed at the 2011 European Championships in Berlin. She qualified to the all-around final in first place, with a score of 59.750, but tore her left anterior cruciate ligament while competing a 2.5 twisting Yurchenko vault in the final. Five days later, she had surgery in Straubing, Germany.

Mustafina's coaches had her resume workouts slowly. Coach Valentina Rodionenko said in May, "Only when we are told that she can proceed with training will we go forward. It's important to save her for the Olympic Games." By July, she was only doing upper body conditioning and rehabilitation on her leg. In August, after the Russian team was announced for the 2011 World Championships, Rodionenko said: "Aliya really wanted to go to Worlds—her heart and soul are literally crying, 'I can do it! I'm ready!' But we do not want to risk costing her the Olympics, and her surgeon in Germany said that she can start real training only in December. She just thinks she's ready now. But she does not really understand what she will face. She must be protected. Sometimes it takes years for people to recover from these injuries, and she hasn't even had five months."

In December, Mustafina returned to competition at the Voronin Cup in Moscow. She placed fourth in the all-around and second on uneven bars with a score of 15.475. Coach Alexander Alexandrov said, "I was pleasantly surprised and happy about her first meet. She didn't do her full routines and full difficulty, but she tried what she was ready for at the time, and for me, it was enough to see. She was nervous, even though her goal was just to compete, to see how she does after eight months off and how well she could handle the pressure and how her knee would feel. I came up to her and said, 'Well, it seems like you're not very nervous at all, and I'm surprised!' And she said, 'Look at my hands, Alexander', and her hands were shaking. 'Maybe I'm not showing that I'm nervous, but inside I have butterflies!'"

=== 2012 ===
Mustafina competed at the Russian national championships in Penza in March at what Alexandrov said was "75 to 80 percent". She won the all-around with a score of 59.533 and uneven bars with a score of 16.220, and finished fifth on balance beam with a score of 13.680. In May, at the 2012 European Championships in Brussels, she contributed scores of 15.166 on vault, 15.833 on uneven bars, and 13.933 on floor toward the Russian team's second-place finish.

At the Russian Cup in Penza in June, she placed second in the all-around, behind Viktoria Komova, with a score of 59.167. In event finals, she placed first on uneven bars, scoring 16.150; second on balance beam, scoring 15.000; and first on floor, scoring 14.750.

==== London Olympics ====
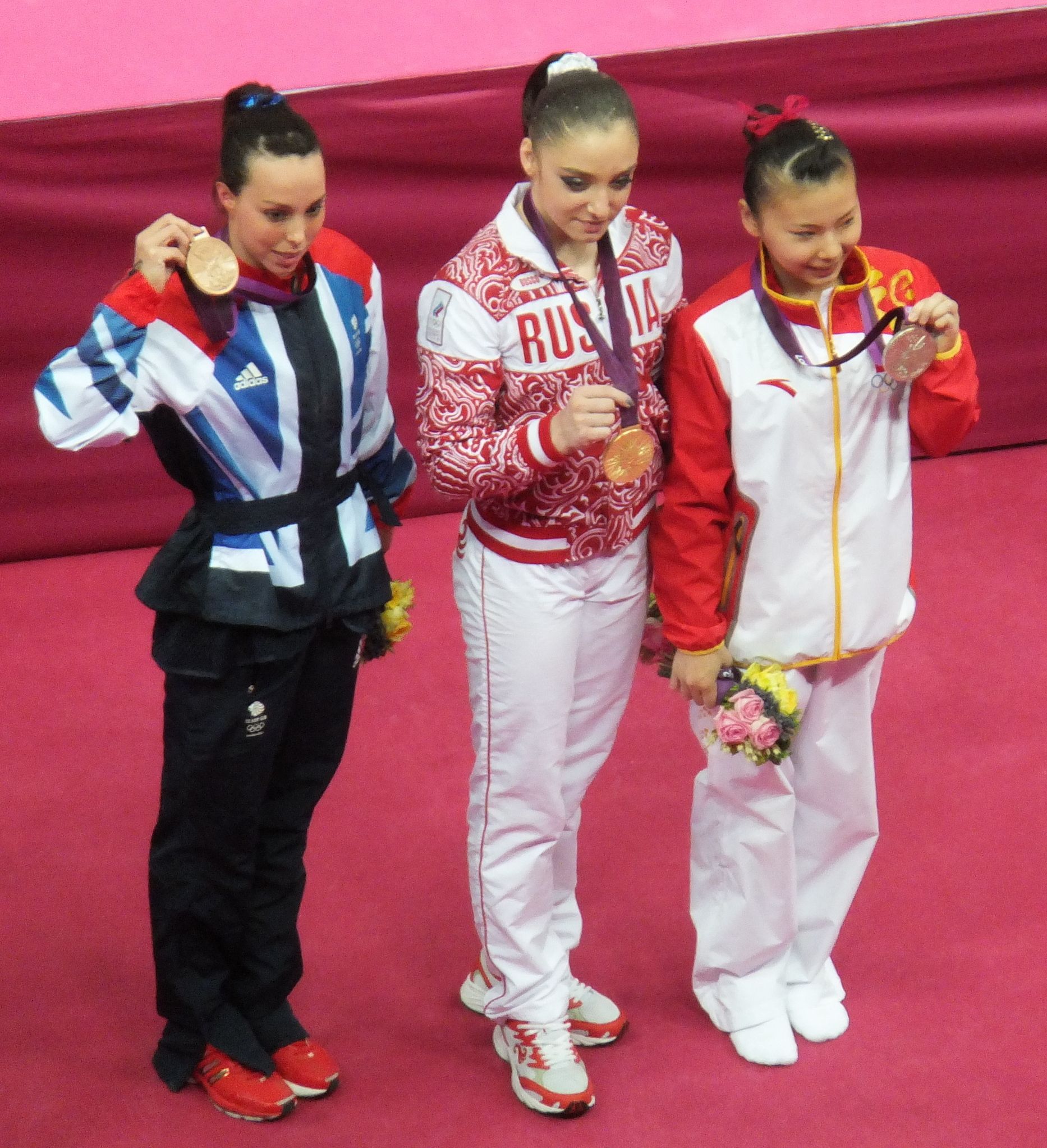
Mustafina (center) holding her gold medal from the 2012 Olympic uneven bars final along with the silver and bronze medalists, He Kexin (right) and Beth Tweddle.

At the end of July, Mustafina competed at the 2012 Summer Olympics in London. She helped Russia to qualify to the team final in second place, and qualified to the individual all-around final in fifth place with a score of 59.966. She also qualified fifth for the uneven bars final, scoring 15.700, and eighth for the floor final, scoring 14.433.

In the team final, Mustafina contributed an all-around score of 60.266 toward the Russian team's second-place finish.

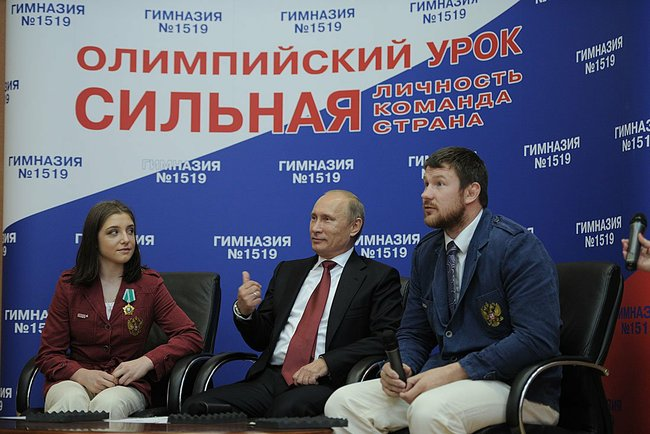
Aliya Mustafina with Russian president Vladimir Putin and Judo Olympic silver medalist Alexander Mikhaylin in 2012

On 15 August, Russian President Vladimir Putin awarded Mustafina the Order of Friendship at a special ceremony at the Kremlin in Moscow. She was one of 33 Russian athletes to receive the award.

In the all-around final, she finished in third place with a score of 59.566. She earned the same score as American Aly Raisman, but after tie-breaking rules were applied, Mustafina was awarded the bronze medal.

Mustafina went on to win the uneven bars final with a score of 16.133, ending Russia's 12-year gold medal drought in Olympic gymnastics.

In the floor final, she placed third with a score of 14.900, earning the bronze medal in a tie-breaker over Italy's Vanessa Ferrari.

In December, she competed at the DTB Stuttgart World Cup, where the Russian team finished first.

=== 2013 ===
At the 2013 Russian national championships, Mustafina successfully defended her all-around title with a score of 59.850, earning a 15.450 on beam, 15.500 on bars, 13.600 on floor, and 15.300 on vault. These scores qualified her to the beam and uneven bars finals in first place, and to the floor exercise final in third place, but she withdrew from all but the bars final to protect her knee. She received a silver medal with the Moscow Central team and finished third in the uneven bars final, behind Anastasia Grishina and Tatiana Nabieva.

Later, Mustafina won the all-around and team titles at the Stella Zakharova Cup. In event finals, she won gold on uneven bars and silver on balance beam after a fall on the latter.

At the 2013 European Championships in Moscow, she fell twice off the balance beam in qualifications and entered the all-around final in fourth place, with a score of 56.057. In the final, she scored 15.033 on vault, 15.133 on uneven bars, 14.400 on balance beam, and 14.466 on floor, winning the all-around title—her first individual European title—with a total of 59.032. The next day, she won the uneven bars final with a score of 15.300. She also qualified to the floor exercise final in third place, but withdrew and gave her spot to Grishina, who had been left out of the final due to the limit of two gymnasts per country.

In July, Mustafina competed at the 2013 Summer Universiade in Kazan, Russia, alongside teammates Nabieva, Ksenia Afanasyeva, Maria Paseka, and Anna Dementyeva. Before the competition, her participation had been in question after she was hospitalized for flu. In the team competition, which also served as a qualification round for the individual finals, Mustafina contributed scores of 13.750 on floor, 14.950 on vault, 15.000 on uneven bars, and 15.200 on beam toward Russia's first-place finish. She qualified to the all-around final as well as the uneven bars, balance beam, and floor finals. In the all-around final, she won the title with a score of 57.900. Individually, she won gold on bars and silver on beam. In the floor final, she fell on her last tumbling pass and finished 9th.

In October, just after turning 19, Mustafina competed at the 2013 World Artistic Gymnastics Championships in Antwerp. Prior to the competition, she had been sick for weeks and had been experiencing knee pain. In qualifications, she fell on her first tumbling pass on floor (two whips into a double Arabian) and crashed her second vault (round-off, half-on, full twist off), causing her to miss the finals in both events. However, she still qualified fifth for the all-around final with a score of 57.165, fifth for uneven bars, and eighth for balance beam. In the all-around final, she finished third with a total of 58.856 (14.891 on vault, 15.233 on uneven bars, 14.166 on balance beam, and 14.566 on floor), behind Simone Biles and Kyla Ross of the United States. In the uneven bars final, she scored 15.033 and finished in third place, behind Huang Huidan and Ross. She went on to win her first world beam title with a score of 14.900, ahead of Ross and Biles.

In her last competition of 2013, Mustafina helped her team finish second at the Stuttgart World Cup, competing only on balance beam.

=== 2014 ===
On 3 April, Mustafina successfully defended her Russian national all-around title, scoring 14.733 for a double-twisting Yurchenko vault, 14.333 on uneven bars, 15.400 on balance beam, and 15.100 on floor exercise.

In May, she competed at the 2014 European Championships in Sofia, Bulgaria. Hampered by an ankle injury, she performed on only two events in qualifications: uneven bars and balance beam. She qualified to both finals, with scores of 15.100 and 14.233, respectively. In the team final, she scored 14.700 on vault, 15.166 on bars, and 14.800 on beam, leading an inexperienced Russian team to a third-place finish behind Romania and Great Britain, which took gold and silver, respectively. In event finals, she placed second on the uneven bars with a score of 15.266, and third on balance beam with a score of 14.733.

At the Russian Cup in Penza in August, Mustafina represented Moscow alongside Paseka, Alla Sosnitskaya, and Daria Spiridonova, and they easily won the team title by five points over silver medalist Saint Petersburg. Individually, Mustafina won the all-around with a total score of 59.133. In the event finals, she won beam with a score of 15.567 and floor with a score of 14.700, and placed second on the uneven bars with a score of 15.267. At the end of the meet, she was selected—along with Paseka, Sosnitskaya, Spiridonova, Maria Kharenkova, and Ekaterina Kramarenko—to represent Russia at the 2014 World Championships in Nanning, China.

In the qualifying round at the World Championships, Mustafina scored 14.900 on vault, 15.166 on bars, 14.308 on beam, and 14.500 on floor, for a total of a 58.874. She qualified second to the all-around final, fourth on bars, seventh on beam, and fifth on floor. Russia qualified to the team final in third place, behind the United States and China. In the team final, Mustafina contributed a 15.133 on vault, 15.066 on bars, 14.766 on beam, and 14.033 on floor to Russia's third-place finish. In the all-around final, she finished fourth with a total score of 57.915, performing well on vault and bars but making mistakes on beam and floor. She would later state that a fever was the cause of her poor performance. In the uneven bars final, she finished in sixth place with a score of 15.100. She then won bronze medals in the balance beam and floor exercise finals, scoring 14.166 on beam and 14.733 on floor to beat out Asuka Teramoto of Japan and MyKayla Skinner of the United States. At the time, this made her the ninth-most decorated female artistic gymnast at the World Championships, with a total of 11 medals.

At the Stuttgart World Cup in late 2014, Mustafina fell on uneven bars and balance beam and made several errors on floor exercise, causing her to finish fifth. In December, after competing for two seasons without a coach, she began working with Sergei Starkin, who coached world champion Denis Ablyazin.

=== 2015 ===
In order to recover from injuries and stress, Mustafina did not compete at the 2015 Russian Championships or the 2015 European Championships. She returned to competition at the 2015 European Games in Baku in June with Viktoria Komova and Seda Tutkhalyan. They won the team final, and in the individual all-around final, Mustafina again placed first with a score of 58.566. She also received a gold medal on bars (15.400) and silver on floor (14.200, her best score of the competition on that apparatus).

On 18 September, Mustafina announced that she was withdrawing from the World Championships in Glasgow due to back pain.

=== 2016 ===
At the end of March, Mustafina was reportedly hospitalized for back pain. On 6 April, she returned to competition at the Russian Championships in Penza. In the first round, she performed watered-down routines on bars and beam, which scored 15.333 and 14.400 respectively. Next day in the team final, she scored 15.300 on bars and 14.133 on beam, helping her team to a silver. In the event finals, she won bronze on bars and beam, scoring 15.200 and 14.800 respectively.

At the European Championships in Bern in June, she qualified first to the uneven bars and balance beam finals, scoring 15.166 and 14.733, respectively. She also performed a downgraded floor routine, for which she scored 13.533. In the team final, she received a 15.333 on bars, 14.800 on beam, and 13.466 on floor. Russia won the gold with a team total of 175.212, five points ahead of the second-place British team. In the uneven bars final, Mustafina won a bronze medal with a score of 15.100, followed by a gold medal on beam with a 15.100:

Her next appearance was at the Russian Cup. In qualifying, she placed fifth after failing to perform an acrobatic series on beam and falling twice on the uneven bars. In the all-around final, she placed third, with one fall on bars. This was her first all-around competition since the 2015 European Games, which she won. Despite withdrawing from event finals to work with a physiotherapist in Moscow, she was named to the Olympic team for Russia along with first-year senior and Russian Cup champion Angelina Melnikova, 2015 World Championships team member Tutkhalyan, and 2015 world champions Paseka and Spiridonova.

==== Rio Olympics ====
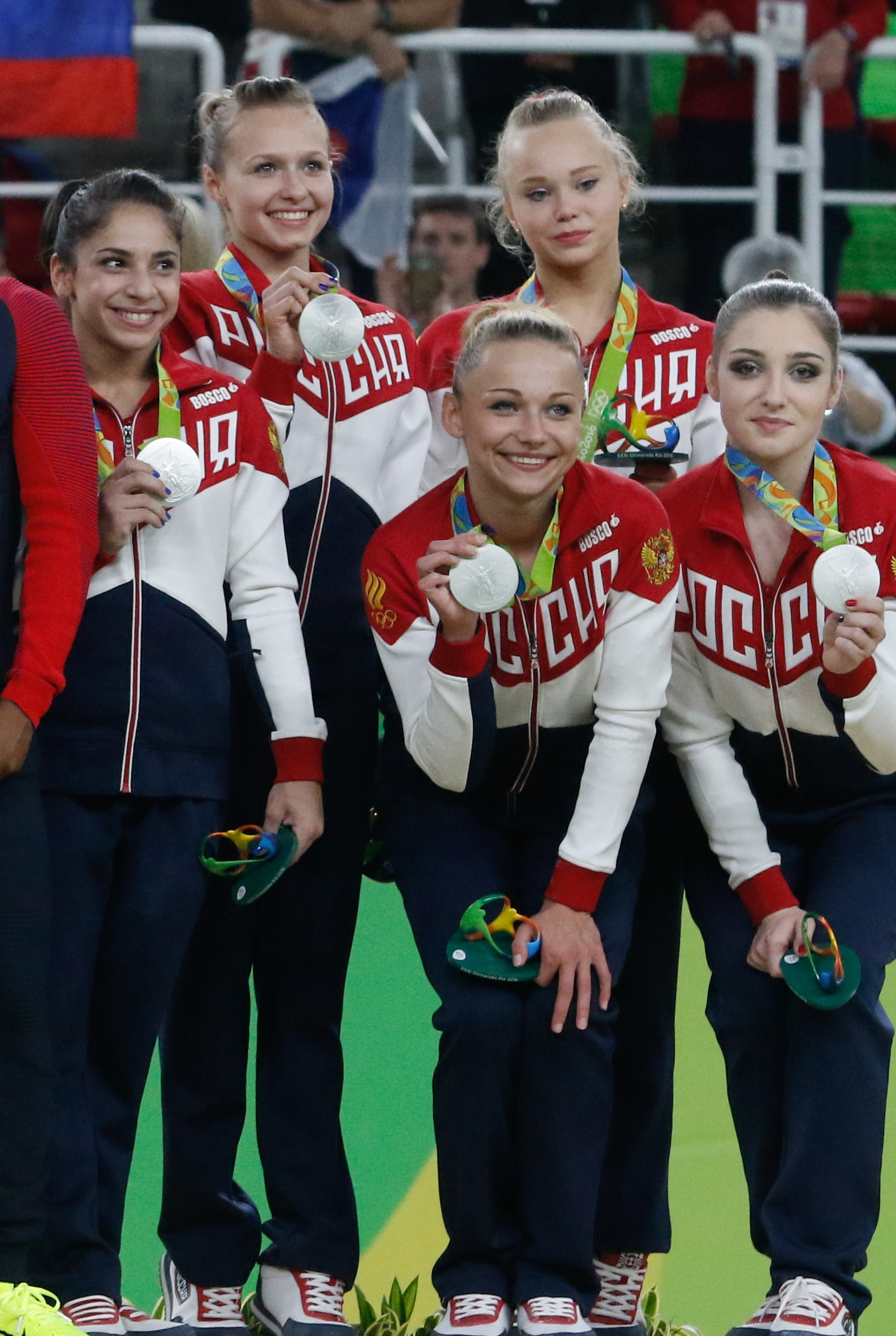
Mustafina (right) with the Russian team after their silver-medal performance at the 2016 Olympics.

At the 2016 Summer Olympics in Rio de Janeiro, Mustafina qualified to the all-around final with a total of 58.098, despite a fall on the balance beam. She also qualified in second place to the uneven bars final with a score of 15.833, and scored 15.166 on vault and 14.066 on floor. Russia qualified to the team final in third place, behind the United States and China.

In the team final on 9 August, Mustafina helped Russia win a silver medal behind the US, with a total team score of 176.688. Mustafina contributed a 15.133 on vault, 15.933 on bars, 14.958 on beam, and 14.000 on floor.

Two days later, Mustafina competed in the individual all-around final and scored 58.665 (15.200 on vault, 15.666 on uneven bars, 13.866 on balance beam, and 13.933 on floor). She placed third behind Americans Simone Biles and Aly Raisman, repeating her bronze-medal performance from the 2012 Olympics. On 14 August, Mustafina competed in the individual uneven bars final. She defended her 2012 title and scored a 15.900, winning the gold medal ahead of American silver medallist Madison Kocian and bronze medallist Sophie Scheder of Germany.

=== 2017 ===
Mustafina returned to training in 2017 after the birth of her daughter, Alisa, with the hope of returning to competition for the 2018 European Championships and eventually the 2020 Tokyo Olympics.

=== 2018 ===
In April, Mustafina competed for the first time in a year and a half at the Russian National Championships in Kazan, Russia. On the first day of competition, she earned a gold medal with the Moscow team and qualified to the all-around, uneven bars, balance beam, and floor exercise finals. Two days later, after crashing her 1.5 Yurchenko and scoring a 12.433 on vault, 14.966 on bars, 12.533 on beam, and 13.066 on floor, she placed fourth in the all-around behind Angelina Melnikova, first-year senior Angelina Simakova, and Viktoria Komova. She later placed sixth in the bars final, fourth in the beam final, and withdrew from the floor final.

In May, Mustafina was scheduled to compete at the Osijek Challenge Cup but withdrew from the competition because of a minor meniscus injury.

On September 29, Mustafina was named on the nominative team to compete at the 2018 World Championships in Doha, Qatar alongside Lilia Akhaimova, Irina Alexeeva, Melnikova, and Simakova. On October 17, the Worlds team was officially announced and was unchanged from the nominative team. During qualifications Mustafina was originally only planning to compete on balance beam and uneven bars, but due to an ankle injury for Simakova she also competed on floor exercise. She qualified for the uneven bars final in sixth place and Russia qualified to the team final in second place.

In the team final on 30 October, Mustafina helped Russia win a silver medal behind the US, with a total team score of 162.863. Mustafina contributed a 14.5 on bars (the second highest score of the day on bars), 13.266 on beam, and 13.066 on floor.

=== 2019 ===
In January it was announced that Mustafina would compete at the Stuttgart World Cup in early March. It was the first time she competed in the all-around in international competition since the Rio Olympics. In March, at the Russian National Championships, Mustafina finished third in the all-around behind Angelina Simakova and Angelina Melnikova. At the Stuttgart World Cup Mustafina finished in fifth place after falling off the balance beam. The following week Mustafina competed at the Birmingham World Cup where she finished first despite falling off the balance beam. After a winning in Birmingham, Mustafina was named to the team to compete at the 2019 European Championships, replacing national champion Simakova who had inconsistent performances in Stuttgart earlier in the month. In April it was announced that Mustafina had withdrawn from the European Championships team in order to focus on preparing for the European Games in June.

In May Mustafina was officially named to the team to compete at the European Games alongside Angelina Melnikova and Aleksandra Shchekoldina. In June Mustafina withdrew from the European Games due to a partial ligament tear in her ankle.

In July, Mustafina trained in Tokyo alongside the rest of the Russian national team, including Juniors Vladislava Urazova and Elena Gerasimova, in preparation for the 2020 Tokyo Olympics. In August Mustafina withdrew from the Russian Cup, but did not cite her reason for doing so. While in attendance at the Russian Cup, Mustafina announced that she would not be competing at the 2019 World Championships, opting to physically and mentally rest and start the 2020 season with "a brand new energy".

=== 2021 ===
Mustafina officially announced her retirement from the sport on June 8, 2021, at the Russian Cup.

== Coaching career ==
In 2021 Mustafina began working as a coach for the junior national team. In February she was announced as the acting head coach of the junior national team.

== Influences ==
When asked about being compared to Khorkina following her success at the 2010 World Championships, Mustafina said, "I have no idols and never have. Svetlana was, of course, an amazing gymnast."

In response to a question about her gymnastics role models, Mustafina praised Nastia Liukin's "elegant and beautiful performances with difficult elements" and Ksenia Afanasyeva's "strong and beautiful gymnastics".

== Personal life ==
Mustafina began dating Russian bobsledder Alexey Zaitsev in Autumn 2015. They met at a hospital where both were recovering from sports injuries. They married on 3 November 2016 in his hometown of Krasnodar.

In January 2017, it was reported that Mustafina was pregnant and that the baby was due in July. Mustafina gave birth to her daughter, Alisa, on 9 June 2017. She was reported to have divorced her husband in April 2018.

== Skills ==
=== Selected competitive skills ===
Apparatus	Name	Description	Difficulty (Note: Valid for the 2017-2020 Code of Points)	Performed
Vault	Baitova	Yurchenko entry, layout salto backwards with two twists	5.4	2012–2019
Vault	½-on Layout 1/1	Yurchenko ½-on entry, layout salto forwards with full twist	5.6	2010, 2013
Vault	Amanar	Yurchenko entry, layout salto backwards with 2½ twists	5.8	2010–2011
Uneven Bars	Chow ½	Stalder Shaposhnikova transition with ½ twist to high bar	E	2012–2013
Uneven Bars	Inbar 1/1	Inbar Stalder to full (1/1) pirouette	E	2010–2016
Uneven Bars	Mustafina	Dismount: 1½-twisting double tucked salto backwards	E	2010–2016
Uneven Bars	Piked Jaeger	Reverse grip swing to piked salto forwards to catch high bar	E	2010–2019
Uneven Bars	Van Leeuwen	Toe-On Shaposhnikova transition with ½ twist to high bar	E	2010–2019
Uneven Bars	Komova II	Inbar Stalder Shaposhnikova transition to high bar	E	2016
Uneven Bars	Seitz	Toe-On Shaposhnikova transition with full twist to high bar	E	2013
Balance Beam	Switch Ring	Switch Leap to Ring Position (180° split with raised back leg)	E	2011–2018
Balance Beam	Arabian	Immediate ½ twist to tucked salto forwards	F	2010–2015
Balance Beam	Triple Twist	Dismount: Triple-twisting (3/1) layout salto backwards	F	2010–2011
Floor Exercise	Andreasen	Tucked Arabian double salto forwards	E	2010–2019
Floor Exercise	Triple Twist	Triple-twisting (3/1) layout salto backwards	E	2010–2014
Floor Exercise	Gómez	1440° (4/1) turn with leg below horizontal	E	2014–2019
Floor Exercise	Mustafina	1080° (3/1) turn with leg held up in 180° split position	E	2014–2019
Floor Exercise	Mukhina	Full-twisting (1/1) double tucked salto backwards	E	2016–2019
Floor Exercise	Double Layout	Double layout salto backwards	F	2015
Floor Exercise	3½ Twist	3½-twisting layout salto backwards	F	2011

=== Eponymous skills ===
Mustafina has two eponymous skills listed in the Code of Points.

Apparatus	Name	Description	Difficulty (Note: Valid for the 2025-2028 Code of Points)	Added to Code of Points
Uneven bars	Mustafina	Dismount: 1½-twisting double tucked salto backwards	E (0.5)	2010 World Championships
Floor exercise	Mustafina	1080° (3/1) turn with leg held up in 180° split position	E (0.5)	2014 World Championships

== Competitive history ==
Competitive history of Aliya Mustafina at the junior level
Year	Event	Team	AA	VT	UB	BB	FX
2007	Japan Junior International		2nd place, silver medalist(s)	2nd place, silver medalist(s)	2nd place, silver medalist(s)	2nd place, silver medalist(s)	2nd place, silver medalist(s)
2007	Gymnix International		2nd place, silver medalist(s)		2nd place, silver medalist(s)	1st place, gold medalist(s)	
2007	Stella Zakharova Cup	2nd place, silver medalist(s)			4		6
2008
2008	European Championships	1st place, gold medalist(s)	2nd place, silver medalist(s)		4		4
2008	Massilia Gym Cup		7	4			2nd place, silver medalist(s)
2009	National Championships	1st place, gold medalist(s)	1st place, gold medalist(s)		2nd place, silver medalist(s)	1st place, gold medalist(s)	3rd place, bronze medalist(s)
2009	Japan Cup	2nd place, silver medalist(s)	2nd place, silver medalist(s)				
2009	Russian Cup		1st place, gold medalist(s)				
2009	Gymnasiade	1st place, gold medalist(s)	1st place, gold medalist(s)	2nd place, silver medalist(s)	1st place, gold medalist(s)	1st place, gold medalist(s)	1st place, gold medalist(s)

Competitive history of Aliya Mustafina at the senior level
Year	Event	Team	AA	VT	UB	BB	FX
2010	Paris World Cup				4	2nd place, silver medalist(s)	
2010	European Championships	1st place, gold medalist(s)	—N/a		2nd place, silver medalist(s)	2nd place, silver medalist(s)	8
2010	Japan Cup	1st place, gold medalist(s)	3rd place, bronze medalist(s)				
2010	Russian Cup			2nd place, silver medalist(s)	1st place, gold medalist(s)	3rd place, bronze medalist(s)	1st place, gold medalist(s)
2010	Netherlands Invitational	1st place, gold medalist(s)	1st place, gold medalist(s)				
2010	World Championships	1st place, gold medalist(s)	1st place, gold medalist(s)	2nd place, silver medalist(s)	2nd place, silver medalist(s)	7	2nd place, silver medalist(s)
2010	Italian Grand Prix				4	1st place, gold medalist(s)	
2010	Toyota International			1st place, gold medalist(s)		2nd place, silver medalist(s)	1st place, gold medalist(s)
2010	Voronin Cup		1st place, gold medalist(s)		1st place, gold medalist(s)		1st place, gold medalist(s)
2011	American Cup		2nd place, silver medalist(s)				
2011	Paris World Cup			1st place, gold medalist(s)	1st place, gold medalist(s)	1st place, gold medalist(s)	
2011	European Championships	—N/a	DNF	WD	WD	WD	WD
2011	Voronin Cup		6		2nd place, silver medalist(s)		
2012	National Championships	1st place, gold medalist(s)	1st place, gold medalist(s)		1st place, gold medalist(s)	5	
2012	CHE vs. GBRn vs. RUS	1st place, gold medalist(s)	1st place, gold medalist(s)				
2012	European Championships	2nd place, silver medalist(s)	—N/a				
2012	Russian Cup	1st place, gold medalist(s)	2nd place, silver medalist(s)		1st place, gold medalist(s)	2nd place, silver medalist(s)	1st place, gold medalist(s)
2012	Olympic Games	2nd place, silver medalist(s)	3rd place, bronze medalist(s)		1st place, gold medalist(s)		3rd place, bronze medalist(s)
2012	Stuttgart World Cup	1st place, gold medalist(s)					
2013	National Championships	2nd place, silver medalist(s)	1st place, gold medalist(s)		3rd place, bronze medalist(s)	WD	WD
2013	Stella Zakharova Cup	1st place, gold medalist(s)	1st place, gold medalist(s)		1st place, gold medalist(s)	2nd place, silver medalist(s)	
2013	European Championships	—N/a	1st place, gold medalist(s)		1st place, gold medalist(s)		WD
2013	Universiade	1st place, gold medalist(s)	1st place, gold medalist(s)		1st place, gold medalist(s)	2nd place, silver medalist(s)	9
2013	World Championships	—N/a	3rd place, bronze medalist(s)		3rd place, bronze medalist(s)	1st place, gold medalist(s)	
2013	Stuttgart World Cup	2nd place, silver medalist(s)					
2014	National Championships	2nd place, silver medalist(s)	1st place, gold medalist(s)		6	3rd place, bronze medalist(s)	WD
2014	European Championships	3rd place, bronze medalist(s)	—N/a		2nd place, silver medalist(s)	3rd place, bronze medalist(s)	
2014	Russian Cup	1st place, gold medalist(s)	1st place, gold medalist(s)		2nd place, silver medalist(s)	1st place, gold medalist(s)	1st place, gold medalist(s)
2014	World Championships	3rd place, bronze medalist(s)	4		6	3rd place, bronze medalist(s)	3rd place, bronze medalist(s)
2014	Stuttgart World Cup		5				
2015
2015	European Games	1st place, gold medalist(s)	1st place, gold medalist(s)		1st place, gold medalist(s)		2nd place, silver medalist(s)
2016	National Championships	2nd place, silver medalist(s)			3rd place, bronze medalist(s)	3rd place, bronze medalist(s)	
2016	European Championships	1st place, gold medalist(s)	—N/a	3rd place, bronze medalist(s)	1st place, gold medalist(s)		
2016	Russian Cup	4	3rd place, bronze medalist(s)			WD	WD
2016	Olympic Games	2nd place, silver medalist(s)	3rd place, bronze medalist(s)		1st place, gold medalist(s)		
2018	National Championships	1st place, gold medalist(s)	4		6	4	WD
2018	World Championships	2nd place, silver medalist(s)			5		
2019	National Championships	1st place, gold medalist(s)	3rd place, bronze medalist(s)		4	8	3rd place, bronze medalist(s)
2019	Stuttgart World Cup		5				
2019	Birmingham World Cup		1st place, gold medalist(s)				

== International scores ==
Year	Competition Description	Location	Apparatus	Rank-Final	Score-Final	Rank-Qualifying	Score-Qualifying
2010	European Championships	Birmingham	Team	1	169.700	1	168.325
2010	European Championships	Birmingham	Uneven Bars	2	15.050	2	15.200
2010	European Championships	Birmingham	Balance Beam	2	14.375	2	14.750
2010	European Championships	Birmingham	Floor Exercise	8	13.225	2	14.325
2010	World Championships	Rotterdam	Team	1	175.397	1	234.521
2010	World Championships	Rotterdam	All-Around	1	61.032	1	60.666
2010	World Championships	Rotterdam	Vault	2	15.066	1	15.283
2010	World Championships	Rotterdam	Uneven Bars	2	15.600	4	15.300
2010	World Championships	Rotterdam	Balance Beam	7	13.766	6	14.933
2010	World Championships	Rotterdam	Floor Exercise	2	14.766	1	14.833
2011	European Championships	Berlin	All-Around	DNF	15.375 (Note: Mustafina was injured in the first rotation and withdrew from the remainder of the competition)	1	59.750
2011	European Championships	Berlin	Vault	WD		3	14.487
2011	European Championships	Berlin	Uneven Bars	WD		1	15.600
2011	European Championships	Berlin	Balance Beam	WD		1	14.900
2011	European Championships	Berlin	Floor Exercise	WD		2	14.525
2012	European Championships	Brussels	Team	2	175.536	2	172.562
2012	European Championships	Brussels	Uneven Bars			5	14.533
2012	European Championships	Brussels	Floor Exercise			32	12.966
2012	Olympic Games	London	Team	2	178.530	2	180.429
2012	Olympic Games	London	All-Around	3	59.566	5	59.966
2012	Olympic Games	London	Uneven Bars	1	16.133	5	15.700
2012	Olympic Games	London	Balance Beam			12	14.700
2012	Olympic Games	London	Floor Exercise	3	14.900	8	14.433
2013	European Championships	Moscow	All-Around	1	59.032	4	56.057
2013	European Championships	Moscow	Uneven Bars	1	15.300	1	15.025
2013	European Championships	Moscow	Balance Beam			40	11.666
2013	European Championships	Moscow	Floor Exercise	WD		3	14.300
2013	World Championships	Antwerp	All-Around	3	58.856	5	57.165
2013	World Championships	Antwerp	Vault			10	14.366
2013	World Championships	Antwerp	Uneven Bars	3	15.033	5	14.900
2013	World Championships	Antwerp	Balance Beam	1	14.900	8	14.133
2013	World Championships	Antwerp	Floor Exercise			25	13.166
2014	European Championships	Sofia	Team	3	169.329	3	170.621
2014	European Championships	Sofia	Uneven Bars	2	15.266	2	15.100
2014	European Championships	Sofia	Balance Beam	3	14.733	4	14.233
2014	World Championships	Nanning	Team	3	171.462	3	228.135
2014	World Championships	Nanning	All-Around	4	57.915	2	58.874
2014	World Championships	Nanning	Uneven Bars	6	15.100	5	15.166
2014	World Championships	Nanning	Balance Beam	3	14.166	8	14.308
2014	World Championships	Nanning	Floor Exercise	3	14.733	5	14.500
2015	European Games	Baku	Team	1	116.897		
2015	European Games	Baku	All-Around	1	58.566	1	58.865
2015	European Games	Baku	Uneven Bars	1	15.400	1	15.200
2015	European Games	Baku	Balance Beam			2	14.566
2015	European Games	Baku	Floor Exercise	2	14.200	1	13.966
2016	European Championships	Bern	Team	1	175.212	2	173.261
2016	European Championships	Bern	Uneven Bars	3	15.100	1	15.166
2016	European Championships	Bern	Balance Beam	1	15.100	1	14.733
2016	European Championships	Bern	Floor Exercise			17	13.533
2016	Olympic Games	Rio de Janeiro	Team	2	176.688	3	174.620
2016	Olympic Games	Rio de Janeiro	All-Around	3	58.665	6	58.098
2016	Olympic Games	Rio de Janeiro	Uneven Bars	1	15.900	2	15.833
2016	Olympic Games	Rio de Janeiro	Balance Beam			59	13.033
2016	Olympic Games	Rio de Janeiro	Floor Exercise			17	14.066
2018	World Championships	Doha	Team	2	162.863	2	165.497
2018	World Championships	Doha	Uneven Bars	5	14.433	6	14.433
2018	World Championships	Doha	Balance Beam			16	13.233

== Floor music ==
Year	Music Title
2007	Sahra Saidi
2008	The Blue Danube
2009	Hijo de la Luna
2010	Por Una Cabeza
2011	Hood Jump
2012	Final Hour
2013	Queen of Hearts and Soulseeker
2014	Ancient Lands and Runaway
2015	My Way
2016	Moscow Nights and Consuelo (Vals para Mimi)
2018	Ancient Lands and Runaway
2019	Survivor (2WEI)

== See also ==
- List of multiple Olympic medalists at a single Games
- List of Olympic female gymnasts for Russia
- List of Olympic medal leaders in women's gymnastics
- List of top female medalists at the World Artistic Gymnastics Championships
