= Joseph Sade =

American wrestler

Personal information
- Born: October 19, 1952 (age 73) Detroit, Michigan, U.S.

Sport
- Country: United States
- Sport: Wrestling
- Event: Greco-Roman
- College team: Oregon, Eastern Michigan
- Club: Minnesota Wrestling Club
- Team: USA

Joseph Sade (born October 19, 1952) is an American wrestler. He competed in the men's Greco-Roman 57 kg at the 1976 Summer Olympics.
