= Grozești, Mehedinți =

Grozești
- Commune
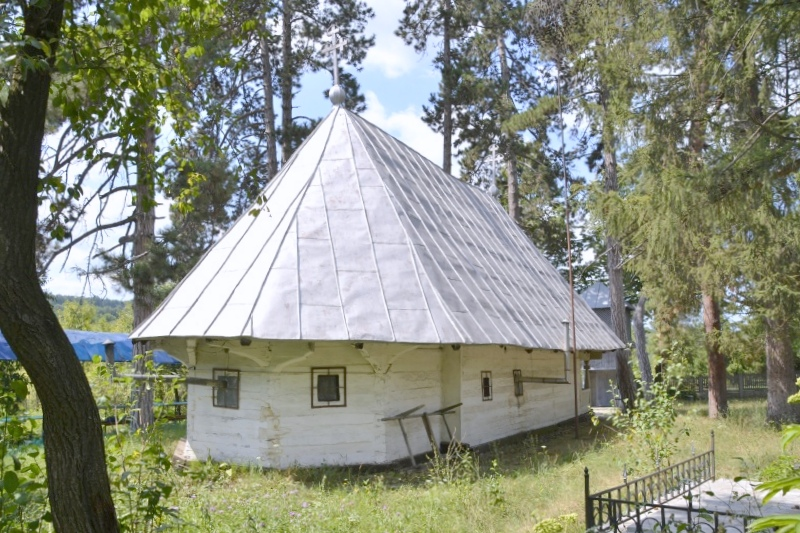
- Wooden church in Șușița

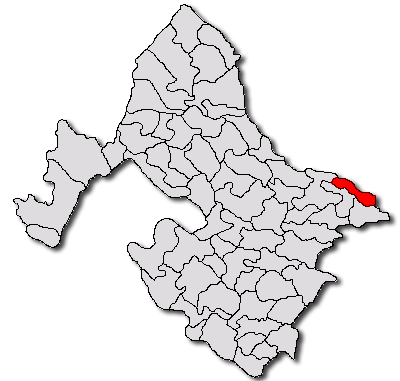
- Location in Mehedinți County

- Location in Romania
- Coordinates: 44°39′N 23°19′E
- Country: Romania
- County: Mehedinți

Government
  - Mayor (2020–2024): Gheorghe Coman (PSD)
- Area: 42.95 km^{2} (16.58 sq mi)
- Elevation: 193 m (633 ft)
- Population (2021-12-01): 1,879
  - Density: 43.75/km^{2} (113.3/sq mi)
- Time zone: UTC+02:00 (EET)
  - Summer (DST): UTC+03:00 (EEST)
- Postal code: 227235
- Vehicle reg.: MH
- Website: comunagrozestimh.ro

Grozești is a commune in Mehedinți County, Oltenia, Romania. It is composed of four villages: Cârceni, Grozești, Păsărani, and Șușița.

The commune is located in the eastern part of Mehedinți County, 67 km (42 mi) from the county seat, Drobeta-Turnu Severin, on the border with Gorj County. The closest towns are Turceni, in Gorj County, and Filiași, 22 km (14 mi) to the southeast, across the Jiu River, in Dolj County.

== Natives ==
- Mihai Boțilă (born 1952), wrestler
