= Nyamyn Jargalsaikhan =

Mongolian wrestler

Personal information
- Nationality: Mongolian
- Born: 24 August 1955 (age 70)

Sport
- Sport: Wrestling

Nyamyn Jargalsaikhan (born 24 August 1955) is a Mongolian wrestler. He competed in the men's Greco-Roman 57 kg at the 1976 Summer Olympics.
