= Alexander Alexandrov (gymnastics coach) =

Russian gymnast

Alexander Alexandrov is the former head of the USSR, Russian, and Brazilian women's artistic gymnastics national teams, and former personal coach of World and Olympic Champions Aliya Mustafina, Rozalia Galiyeva, Dmitry Bilozerchev, Valentin Mogilny, and others. Alexandrov also coached for a period in the United States, where he led Carly Patterson, Mohini Bhardwaj, Dominique Moceanu, and Kim Zmeskal to World and Olympic medals as the head of the Houston Gymnastics Club.

Alexandrov currently resides in the United States, after leaving his position as head of the Brazilian women's team.
