= An Han-young =

South Korean wrestler (born 1948)

Personal information
- Nationality: South Korean
- Born: 19 March 1948 (age 78)

Sport
- Sport: Wrestling

An Han-young (born 19 March 1948) is a South Korean wrestler. He competed in the men's Greco-Roman 57 kg at the 1976 Summer Olympics.
