= Pertti Ukkola =

Finnish wrestler (born 1950)

Medal record

Representing Finland

Men's Greco-Roman wrestling

Olympic Games
Gold medal – first place	1976 Montreal	Bantamweight

Pertti Ukkola Portrait

Pertti Ukkola (born 10 August 1950 in Sodankylä) is a Finnish wrestler and Olympic champion in Greco-Roman wrestling. He was selected Finnish Sportspersonality of the year 1977.
