= Lisa Katharina Hill =

German artistic gymnast

- Born: 16 July 1992 (age 34) Hanover, Germany

Gymnastics career
- Discipline: Women's artistic gymnastics
- Country represented: Germany
- Club: MTV Stuttgart
- Head coach: Ulla Koch
Medal record
Representing Germany
Universiade
Bronze medal – third place	2013 Kazan	Team
Bronze medal – third place	2013 Kazan	Uneven bars

|

Lisa Katharina Hill (born 16 July 1992) is a German artistic gymnast. She competed at four World Championships (2010, 2011, 2014, 2015) and was Germany's alternate for the 2012 Summer Olympics. She won a bronze medal on the uneven bars at the 2013 Summer Universiade in addition to winning bronze with the team.

== Gymnastics career ==
Hill competed at the 2006 Junior European Championships alongside Marie-Sophie Hindermann, Anja Brinker, Joeline Möbius, and Dorothee Henzler, and they won the bronze medal in the team competition behind Russia and Romania.

Hill was a member of the German team that finished eleventh at the 2010 World Championships, and she helped the team finish sixth at the 2011 World Championships. After the 2011 World Championships, she won a silver medal on the floor exercise and a bronze medal on the balance beam at the Toyota Cup in Japan.

Hill won a bronze medal on the uneven bars at the 2012 Doha World Cup behind Beth Tweddle and Jiang Yuyuan. She then placed sixth in the European Championships uneven bars final. She was the alternate for the German team that finished ninth at the 2012 Summer Olympics.

Hill qualified for the all-around final at the 2013 European Championships and finished 14th. She then won a silver medal on the uneven bars at the Anadia World Challenge Cup behind Russia's Anastasia Grishina. At the 2013 Summer Universiade, she won a bronze medal with her team and on the uneven bars. She could not compete at the 2013 World Championships due to a foot injury while training a Yurchenko double twist vault.

Hill competed at the 2014 Gym Festival Trnava in Slovakia and won the silver medal in the all-around behind Anna Pavlova. Additionally, she won the gold medal on the uneven bars by nearly a full point and placed fifth on the balance beam and floor exercise. At the 2014 World Championships, she helped the German team finish ninth. She was the only member of the German team to qualify for the all-around final, where she finished 22nd. She also finished seventh in the uneven bars final after brushing her feet on the ground during a Pak salto. After the World Championships, she competed at the 2014 Stuttgart World Cup and placed eighth in the all-around.

Hill missed the beginning of the 2015 season, including the European Championships, due to a meniscus injury. She competed at the 2015 World Championships with the German team that finished 12th in the qualification round. She won a gold medal on the uneven bars at the 2018 Salamunov Memorial in Maribor, Slovenia. She competed on the uneven bars and the balance beam at the 2019 Doha World Cup but did not advance beyond the qualification round.

As of 2023, Hill continues to compete in the domestic Bundesliga league, but she has not appeared in international competition since 2019.
