= Josef Krysta =

Czech wrestler

Personal information
- Nationality: Czech
- Born: 24 October 1956 (age 68); Český Těšín, Czechoslovakia

Sport
- Sport: Wrestling

Josef Krysta (born 24 October 1956) is a Czech wrestler. He competed at the 1976 Summer Olympics and the 1980 Summer Olympics.
