= Mihai Boțilă =

Romanian wrestler

Personal information
- Nationality: Romanian
- Born: 14 January 1952 (age 73); Grozești, Romania

Sport
- Sport: Wrestling

Mihai Boțilă (born 14 January 1952) is a Romanian wrestler. He competed at the 1976 Summer Olympics and the 1980 Summer Olympics.
