= Józef Lipień =

Polish wrestler (1949–2026)

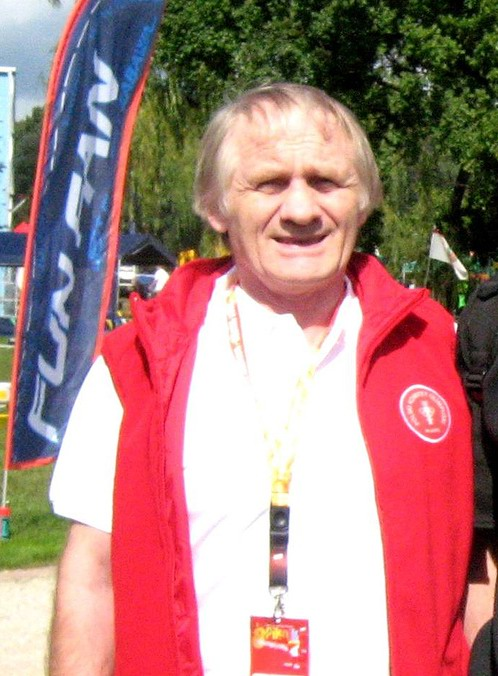
- Lipień in 2007

Medal record

Men's Greco-Roman wrestling

Representing Poland

Olympic Games
Silver medal – second place	1980 Moscow	57 kg

World Championships
Gold medal – first place	1973 Tehran	57 kg
Silver medal – second place	1974 Katowice	57 kg
Silver medal – second place	1975 Minsk	57 kg

European Championships
Bronze medal – third place	1978 Sofia	57 kg

Józef Lipień (6 February 1949 – 25 October 2026) was a Polish wrestler (Greco-Roman style).

== Biography ==
Lipień was born in Jaczków on 6 February 1949. He was the twin brother of the Polish wrestler Kazimierz Lipień.

Lipień died on 25 October 2026, at the age of 77.

== Sources ==
- sports-reference.com
- sports123.com
- Profile (Polish)
