= Yu Minobe =

Japanese artistic gymnast

- Born: 23 February 1990 (age 36) Tokyo, Japan
- Height: 1.48 m (4 ft 10 in)

Gymnastics career
- Country represented: Japan
- Club: Asahi Seimei Gymnastics Club
- Head coach: Chieko Tsukahara
- Retired: 2016, 2020
Medal record
Representing Japan
Summer Universiade
Gold medal – first place	2011 Shenzhen	Team
Gold medal – first place	2011 Shenzhen	Uneven bars
Gold medal – first place	2011 Shenzhen	Balance beam
Gold medal – first place	2015 Gwangju	Balance beam
Silver medal – second place	2013 Kazan	Team
Silver medal – second place	2015 Gwangju	Team
Asian Championships
Gold medal – first place	2008 Doha	Team
Silver medal – second place	2008 Doha	Balance beam

Yu Minobe (美濃部 ゆう, Minobe Yū; born 23 February 1990) is a Japanese former artistic gymnast who competed at the 2008 and 2012 Summer Olympics. She won three gold medals at the 2011 Summer Universiade and also won the balance beam title at the 2015 Summer Universiade.

== Gymnastics career ==
Minobe represented Japan at the 2008 Summer Olympics, the first major international competition of her career. She competed on the vault, uneven bars, and balance beam in the qualifications to help Japan advance into the team final. She did not compete in the team final, but Japan finished fifth. After the Olympics, she competed at the 2008 Asian Championships and won a gold medal with the team. She also won a silver medal in the balance beam final. She missed most of the 2010 season due to stress fractures in her ribs.

Minobe helped Japan win the team gold medal at the 2011 Summer Universiade. She then finished fourth in the all-around final. She went on to win gold medals on both the uneven bars and the balance beam in the apparatus finals. At the 2011 World Championships, Minobe and the Japanese team finished fifth in the team final and earned a berth to the 2012 Summer Olympics.

Minobe was selected to represent Japan at the 2012 Summer Olympics after finishing second at the NHK Trophy. She fell off the uneven bars in the qualification round, but Japan still advanced into the team final. She also fell on her balance beam dismount in the team final, where Japan finished eighth.

Minobe competed with the Japanese team that won the silver medal, behind Russia, at the 2013 Summer Universiade. Individually, she advanced into the all-around final and finished ninth. In the apparatus finals, she finished sixth on the uneven bars, eighth on the balance beam, and fifth on the floor exercise. At the 2013 World Championships, she competed on the uneven bars and the balance beam but did not advance into either apparatus final.

Minobe competed on the uneven bars and the balance beam in the 2014 World Championships team final, where Japan finished eighth. At the 2015 Summer Universiade, she helped Japan win the team silver medal, behind Russia. She advanced into the balance beam final, where she won the gold medal.

Minobe was not selected to compete at the 2016 Summer Olympics. She announced her initial retirement from the sport in 2016 and moved to Canada to work as a coach. She spent three years in Canada but returned to Japan for surgery on a dislocated shoulder. She decided to return to competition after recovering from the surgery. At the 2020 All-Japan Senior Championships, she finished 43rd in the all-around.
