= 2015 in artistic gymnastics =

Below is a list of women's artistic gymnastics events held in 2015, as well as the medalists.

== Calendar of events ==
Date	Location	Event	Winner(s)
January 29 – February 1	(Canada) Trois-Rivières	Elite Canada	Senior AA: Rose-Kaying Woo; Senior VT: Shallon Olsen; Senior UB: Sabrina Gill; Senior BB: Ellie Black; Senior FX: Hélody Cyrenne; Junior AA: Megan Roberts; Junior VT: Megan Roberts; Junior UB: Megan Roberts; Junior BB: Jade Chrobok; Junior FX: Megan Roberts
February 3–6	(India) Kerala	National Games of India	TF: West Bengal; AA: Dipa Karmakar; VT: Dipa Karmakar; UB: Dipa Karmakar; BB: Dipa Karmakar; FX: Dipa Karmakar
February 6–8	(United States) Houston	Houston National Invitational	AA: (Brazil) Letícia Costa; VT: (Uzbekistan) Oksana Chusovitina; UB: (Venezuela) Jessica López; BB: (Venezuela) Jessica López; FX: (Brazil) Letícia Costa
February 7	(Italy) Ancona	1st Italian Serie A Nationale	Brixia Brescia (Erika Fasana, Vanessa Ferrari, Martina Rizzelli, Francesca Linari, Chiara Imeraj, Sofia Busato)
February 13–15	(United States) Oklahoma City	Nadia Comăneci International Invitational	Junior TF: Romania; Junior AA: Olivia Cîmpian and Ioana Crisan; Junior VT: Ioana Crisan; Junior UB: (Canada) Laurie-Lou Vezina; Junior BB: Ioana Crisan; Junior FX: Olivia Cîmpian
February 13–15	(United States) Frisco	WOGA Classic	Senior AA: (China) Xie Yufen; Senior VT: (United States) Katelyn Ohashi; Senior UB: (China) Xie Yufen; Senior BB: (Netherlands) Céline van Gerner; Senior FX: (Japan) Natsumi Sasada; Junior AA: (United States) Elena Arenas; Junior VT: (United States) Aria Brusch; Junior UB: (United States) Aria Brusch; Junior BB: (United States) Elena Arenas and (United States) Morgan Hurd; Junior FX: (Russia) Irina Alexeeva and (Japan) Kajita Nagi
February 15–19	(Canada) Prince George	Canada Winter Games	TF: Québec; AA: Rose-Kaying Woo; VT: Megan Roberts; UB: Audrey Rousseau; BB: Rose-Kaying Woo; FX: Megan Roberts
February 21–22	(Scotland) Perth	Scottish National Championships	Senior AA: Amy Regan; Senior VT: Amy Regan; Senior UB: Amy Regan; Senior BB: Amy Regan and Megan Wright; Senior FX: Amy Regan; Junior AA: Louise McColgan; Junior VT: Louise McColgan; Junior UB: Louise McColgan; Junior BB: Louise McColgan; Junior FX: Louise McColgan; Espoir AA: Isla Warr; Espoir VT: Erin Gallacher; Espoir UB: Laura-Jane Core; Espoir BB: Isla Warr; Espoir FX: Kacey Morrison
February 21–22	(Netherlands) Heerenveen	Sidijk Tournament	Senior AA: Eythora Thorsdottir; Junior AA: Sering Perdok
February 28	(Austria) Linz	Austrian Team Open	TF: China; AA: (Switzerland) Giulia Steingruber; VT: (Switzerland) Giulia Steingruber; UB: Zhou Linlin; BB: (Switzerland) Giulia Steingruber; FX: (Switzerland) Giulia Steingruber
February 28	(Wales) Cardiff	Welsh National Championships	Senior AA: Raer Theaker; Senior VT: Raer Theaker; Senior UB: Raer Theaker; Senior BB: Raer Theaker; Senior FX: Raer Theaker; Junior AA: Maisie Methuen; Junior VT: Maisie Methuen; Junior UB: Latalia Bevan; Junior BB: Maisie Methuen; Junior FX: Maisie Methuen; Open Senior AA: (Wales) Raer Theaker; Open Senior VT: (England) Eshe Bernard; Open Senior UB: (England) Chelsea Court; Open Senior BB: (England) Georgina Clements; Open Senior FX: (Wales) Raer Theaker; Open Junior AA: (England) Catherine Lyons; Open Junior VT: (England) Abigail Solari; Open Junior UB: (England) Catherine Lyons; Open Junior BB: (England) Catherine Lyons; Open Junior FX: (England) Catherine Lyons
February 28	(Italy) Milan	2nd Italian Serie A Nationale	Brixia Brescia (Erika Fasana, Vanessa Ferrari, Francesca Linari, Martina Rizzelli, Chiara Imeraj, Sofia Busato)
March 4–8	(Russia) Penza	Russian National Championships	TF: Central Federal District; AA: Maria Kharenkova; VT: Alla Sosnitskaya; UB: Daria Spiridonova; BB: Maria Kharenkova; FX: Ksenia Afanasyeva
March 5–6	(Azerbaijan) Baku	Baku Prepares	AA: (Azerbaijan) Kristina Pravdina; VT: (Azerbaijan) Maria Smirnova; UB: (Azerbaijan) Kristina Pravdina; BB: (Norway) Martine Skregelid; FX: (Azerbaijan) Maria Smirnova
March 5–8	(Canada) Montreal	L'International Gymnix	Challenge AA: Victoria-Kayen Woo; Challenge VT: Hélody Cyrenne; Challenge UB: Sabrina Gill; Challenge BB: Isabela Onyshko; Challenge FX: Sydney Soloski; Junior Cup TF: Canada; Junior Cup AA: Rose-Kaying Woo; Junior Cup VT: Shallon Olsen; Junior Cup UB: (Russia) Natalia Kapitonova; Junior Cup BB: Rose-Kaying Woo; Junior Cup FX: Rose-Kaying Woo
March 6	(United States) Arlington	Nastia Liukin Cup	Senior: Maddie Karr; Junior: Kiya Johnson
March 7	(United States) Arlington	AT&T American Cup	(United States) Simone Biles
March 13–15	(England) Loughborough	English Championships	Senior AA: Amy Tinkler; Senior VT: Claudia Fragapane; Senior UB: Becky Downie; Senior BB: Amy Tinkler; Senior FX: Kelly Simm; Junior AA: Catherine Lyons; Junior VT: Catherine Lyons; Junior UB: Alice Kinsella; Junior BB: Catherine Lyons; Junior FX: Catherine Lyons; Espoir AA: Chiara Bunce; Espoir VT: Annabel Agba; Espoir UB: Chiara Bunce; Espoir BB: Amelie Morgan; Espoir FX: Isabel Davis
March 13–15	(France) Rouen	French National Championships	TF: Alliance Dijon Gym 21; Senior AA: Loan His; Junior AA: Lorette Charpy; VT: Camille Bahl; UB: Louise Vanhille; BB: Marine Boyer; FX: Loan His
March 14	(Italy) Florence	3rd Italian Serie A Nationale	Brixia Brescia (Martina Rizzelli, Giorgia Villa, Francesca Linari, Erika Fasana, Vanessa Ferrari, Chiara Imeraj, Lavinia Marongiu)
March 19–22	(Germany) Cottbus	Cottbus World Cup	VT: (Uzbekistan) Oksana Chusovitina; UB: (Sweden) Jonna Adlerteg; BB: (Romania) Andreea Munteanu; FX: (Poland) Marta Pihan-Kulesza
March 25–27	(Qatar) Doha	Doha World Cup	VT: (Switzerland) Giulia Steingruber; UB: (France) Youna Dufournet; BB: (Vietnam) Phan Thị Hà Thanh; FX: (Switzerland) Giulia Steingruber
March 27–29	(United Kingdom) Liverpool	British National Championships	Senior AA: Amy Tinkler; Senior VT: Claudia Fragapane; Senior UB: Tyesha Mattis; Senior BB: Tyesha Mattis; Senior FX: Amy Tinkler; Junior AA: Catherine Lyons; Junior VT: Catherine Lyons; Junior UB: Georgia-Mae Fenton; Junior BB: Catherine Lyons; Junior FX: Catherine Lyons
March 28–29	(Belgium) Malmedy	Belgian Championships	Senior AA: Cindy Vandenhole; Junior AA: Nina Derwael; Espoir AA: Imke Wolthuzien
March 28–29	(Italy) Jesolo	City of Jesolo Trophy	Senior TF: United States; Senior AA: Simone Biles; Senior VT: Simone Biles; Senior UB: Kyla Ross; Senior BB: Simone Biles; Senior FX: Simone Biles; Junior TF: United States; Junior AA: Laurie Hernandez; Junior VT: Jazmyn Foberg; Junior UB: Laurie Hernandez; Junior BB: Norah Flatley; Junior FX: Laurie Hernandez
March 28–29	(Germany) Heidelberg	German Junior Championships	AA: Tabea Alt; VT: Tabea Alt; UB: Tabea Alt and Maike Enderle; BB: Tabea Alt; FX: Amélie Föllinger
March 28–29	(Hungary) Budapest	Hungarian Apparatus Championships	VT: Boglárka Dévai; UB: Dorina Böczögő; BB: Dorina Böczögő; FX: Dorina Böczögő and Tünde Csillag
March 31 – April 4	(Russia) Penza	Russian Junior National Championships	TF: Central Federal District 1 MS AA: Daria Skrypnik; MS VT: Elena Eremina; MS UB: Daria Skrypnik; MS BB: Angelina Melnikova; MS FX: Ekaterina Sokova; CMS AA: Angelina Simakova; CMS VT: Angelina Simakova; CMS UB: Yuliana Perebinosova; CMS BB: Varvara Zubova; CMS FX: Viktoria Gorbatova and Angelina Simakova
April 3–8	(Mexico) Monterrey	Mexican National Championships	AA: Elsa García; VT: Elsa García; UB: Elsa García; BB: Elsa García; FX: Elsa García
April 4–5	(Slovenia) Ljubljana	Ljubljana World Cup	VT: (Uzbekistan) Oksana Chusovitina; UB: (Canada) Isabela Onyshko; BB: (Canada) Isabela Onyshko; FX: (Netherlands) Eythora Thorsdottir
April 15–19	(France) Montpellier	European Championships	AA: (Switzerland) Giulia Steingruber; VT: (Russia) Maria Paseka; UB: (Russia) Daria Spiridonova; BB: (Romania) Andreea Munteanu; FX: (Russia) Ksenia Afanasyeva
April 24–26	(Japan) Tokyo	Japanese All-Around Championships	Asuka Teramoto
April 25	(Germany) Mannheim	Bundesliga	TF: MTV Stuttgart; AA: (Russia) Ekaterina Kramarenko
May 1–2	(Sweden) Halmstad	Swedish National Championships	Senior AA: Marcela Torres; Junior AA: Sofie Emilson
May 1–3	(Brazil) São Paulo	São Paulo World Cup	VT: (China) Deng Yalan; UB: (China) Shang Chunsong; BB: (China) Shang Chunsong; FX: (Brazil) Flávia Saraiva
May 7–9	(Bulgaria) Varna	Varna World Cup	VT: (Uzbekistan) Oksana Chusovitina; UB: (North Korea) Kang Yong-mi; BB: (Vietnam) Phan Thị Hà Thanh; FX: (Switzerland) Ilaria Käslin
May 9	(Portugal) Anadia	Portuguese Championships	Senior AA: Ana Filipa Martins; Junior AA: Mariana Marianito
May 9	(Italy) Rimini	4th Italian Serie A Nationale	Brixia Brescia (Giorgia Villa, Martina Rizzelli, Sofia Busato, Erika Fasana, Lavinia Marongiu, Francesca Linari, Vanessa Ferrari, Chiara Imeraj)
May 9–10	(Finland) Espoo	Finnish National Championships	Senior AA: Annika Urvikko; Senior VT: Annika Urvikko; Senior UB: Annika Urvikko; Senior BB: Agnes Suto; Senior FX: Annika Urvikko; Junior AA: Riina Kaleva; Junior VT: Riina Kaleva; Junior UB: Isabella Ahlblad; Junior BB: Helmi Murto; Junior FX: Riina Kaleva
May 13	(Mexico) Monterrey	Olympiada Nacional de Gimnasia	Ana Lago
May 13–17	(Russia) Saint Petersburg	Diyatin Cup	Senior AA: (Russia) Daria Elizarova; Senior VT: (Russia) Tatiana Nabieva; Senior UB: (Germany) Elisabeth Seitz; Senior BB: (Russia) Daria Elizarova; Senior FX: (Russia) Daria Elizarova; Junior AA: (Russia) Elena Eremina; Junior VT: (Russia) Elena Eremina; Junior UB: (Russia) Natalia Kapitonova; Junior BB: (Russia) Elena Eremina; Junior FX: (Russia) Natalia Kapitonova
May 16–17	(Japan) Tokyo	NHK Cup	Aiko Sugihara
May 21–24	(Australia) Melbourne	Australian National Championships	Senior TF: Victoria; Senior AA: Georgia Godwin; Senior VT: Emily Little; Senior UB: Rianna Mizzen; Senior BB: Georgia Godwin; Senior FX: Lauren Mitchell; Junior TF: Victoria; Junior AA: Emily Whitehead; Junior VT: Talia Folino; Junior UB: Emily Whitehead; Junior BB: Talia Folino; Junior FX: Emily Whitehead
May 21–24	(Portugal) Anadia	Anadia World Cup	VT: (Cuba) Marcia Videaux; UB: (Venezuela) Jessica López; BB: (Sweden) Emma Larsson; FX: (Hungary) Dorina Böczögő
May 22–24	(Poland) Szczecin	Polish International Championship	Senior AA: Katarzyna Jurkowska-Kowalska; Senior VT: Gabriela Janik and Paula Plichta; Senior UB: Gabriela Janik; Senior BB: Katarzyna Jurkowska-Kowalska; Senior FX: Paula Plichta; Junior AA: Patrycja Dronia; Junior VT: Wanda Drelicharz; Junior UB: Patrycja Dronia; Junior BB: Oliwia Szymska; Junior FX: Patrycja Dronia
May 28–31	(Canada) Gatineau	Canadian National Championships	Senior AA: Ellie Black; Senior VT: Shallon Olsen; Senior UB: Isabela Onyshko; Senior BB: Ellie Black; Senior FX: Isabela Onyshko; Junior AA: Megan Roberts; Junior VT: Megan Roberts; Junior UB: Jade Chrobok; Junior BB: Meixi Semple; Junior FX: Megan Roberts
May 30	(United States) Huntsville	American Classic	Colbi Flory
May 30	(Italy) Turin	Four Nations Trophy	TF: Russia; AA: Seda Tutkhalyan
May 30–31	(Belgium) Ghent	Flanders International Team Challenge	Super TF: Germany; Senior AA: (Brazil) Flávia Saraiva; Junior AA: (Belgium) Nina Derwael
June 1–4	(China) Fuzhou	Chinese National Championships	TF: Hunan; AA: Shang Chunsong; VT: Wang Yan; UB: Fan Yilin; BB: Shang Chunsong; FX: Wang Yan
June 1–6	(Iceland) Reykjavík	Games of the Small States of Europe	TF: Iceland; AA: Dominiqua Belanyi; VT: Norma Róbertsdóttir; UB: Dominiqua Belanyi; BB: Norma Róbertsdóttir; FX: Thelma Hermannsdottir
June 6	(France) Saint-Étienne	French Cup Final	TF: Avoine
June 6–7	(Slovakia) Trnava	Gym Festival Trnava	AA: (Slovakia) Barbora Mokošová; VT: (United Kingdom) Lisa Mason; UB: (Germany) Lea Wolff; BB: (Czech Republic) Aneta Holasová; FX: (Slovakia) Barbora Mokošová
June 6–14	Singapore	Southeast Asian Games	TF: Malaysia; AA: (Vietnam) Phan Thị Hà Thanh; VT: (Vietnam) Phan Thị Hà Thanh; UB: Ing Yueh Tan; BB: (Vietnam) Phan Thị Hà Thanh; FX: Farah Ann Abdul Hadi
June 14–20	(Azerbaijan) Baku	European Games	TF: Russia; AA: Aliya Mustafina; VT: (Switzerland) Giulia Steingruber; AA: Aliya Mustafina; BB: (Netherlands) Lieke Wevers; FX: (Switzerland) Giulia Steingruber
June 14–21	(China) Zibo	Chinese Junior National Championships	TF: Ningbo; AA: Liu Tingting; VT: Liu Jinru; UB: Luo Huan; BB: Liu Tingting; FX: Lu Yufei
June 16–22	(Colombia) Santiago de Cali	South American Gymnastics Championships	TF: Brazil; AA: Daniele Hypólito; VT: Daniele Hypólito; UB: Jade Barbosa; BB: Daniele Hypólito; FX: Letícia Costa
June 20–21	(Japan) Tokyo	Japanese Event Championships	VT: Sae Miyakawa; UB: Asuka Teramoto; BB: Yu Minobe; FX: Mai Murakami
June 24–29	(Netherlands) Alkmaar	International Children's Games	TF: Russia; VT: (Iceland) Inga Sigurdardottir; UB: Ekaterina Levchenko; BB: (Chinese Taipei) Pin-Ju Lai; FX: Svetlana Mazunina
July 4–7	(South Korea) Gwangju	Summer Universiade	TF: Russia; AA: (United Kingdom) Kelly Simm; VT: Maria Paseka; UB: Ekaterina Kramarenko; BB: (Japan) Yu Minobe; FX: Polina Fedorova
July 11–15	(Canada) Toronto	Pan American Games	TF: United States; AA: (Canada) Ellie Black; VT: (Cuba) Marcia Videaux; UB: Rachel Gowey; BB: (Canada) Ellie Black; FX: (Canada) Ellie Black
July 25	(United States) Hoffman Estates	U.S. Classic	Senior AA: Simone Biles; Senior VT: Simone Biles; Senior UB: Madison Kocian; Senior BB: Simone Biles; Senior FX: Simone Biles; Junior AA: Laurie Hernandez; Junior VT: Laurie Hernandez; Junior UB: Laurie Hernandez; Junior BB: Jazmyn Foberg; Junior FX: Ragan Smith
July 25 – August 1	(Georgia (country)) Tbilisi	European Youth Summer Olympic Festival	TF: Russia; AA: Daria Skrypnik; VT: (France) Marine Boyer; UB: Daria Skrypnik; BB: (Belgium) Axelle Klinckaert; FX: (Belgium) Axelle Klinckaert
July 31 – August 2	(Japan) Hiroshima	Asian Championships	TF: Japan; AA: Aiko Sugihara; VT: (China) Wang Yan; UB: (China) Zhu Xiaofang; BB: (China) Fan Yilin; FX: (China) Wang Yan
August 7–8	(Australia) Leederville	Australia-China Friendly	AA: (China) Li Qi; VT: (China) Yuan Xiaoyang; UB: (Australia) Georgia-Rose Brown; BB: (China) Li Qi; FX: (China) Li Qi
August 13–16	(United States) Indianapolis	U.S. National Championships	Senior AA: Simone Biles; Senior VT: Simone Biles; Senior UB: Madison Kocian; Senior BB: Simone Biles; Senior FX: Aly Raisman; Junior AA: Laurie Hernandez; Junior VT: Jordan Chiles; Junior UB: Laurie Hernandez; Junior BB: Ragan Smith; Junior FX: Ragan Smith
August 20–22	(Japan) Niigata	All Japan College Championships	AA: Asuka Teramoto; VT: Mai Murakami; UB: Asuka Teramoto; BB: Asuka Teramoto; FX: Wakana Inoue
August 28–30	(Georgia (country)) Batumi	Batumi International	AA: (Russia) Evgenia Shelgunova; VT: (Russia) Maria Paseka; UB: (Russia) Viktoria Komova; BB: (Russia) Seda Tutkhalyan; FX: (Russia) Evgenia Shelgunova
September 4–19	(Republic of the Congo) Brazzaville	All-Africa Games	TF: South Africa; AA: Kirsten Beckett; VT: (Algeria) Farah Boufadene; UB: (Algeria) Farah Boufadene; BB: Kirsten Beckett
September 12	(United Kingdom) Stoke-on-Trent	British Team Championships	TF: Liverpool; AA: Amy Tinkler
September 12	(Romania) Bucharest	Romania-France Friendly	AA: (Romania) Larisa Iordache; VT: (Romania) Larisa Iordache and (Romania) Anamaria Ocolișan; UB: (France) Louise Vanhille; BB: (Romania) Larisa Iordache; FX: (Romania) Larisa Iordache
September 12–13	(Italy) Porto San Giorgio	Golden League	TF: GAL Lissone; AA: Carlotta Ferlito; VT: Sofia Busato and Martina Rizzelli; UB: Enus Mariani; BB: Carlotta Ferlito; FX: Francesca Linari
September 13–20	(China) Liupanshui	Chinese Individual National Championships	AA: Wang Cenyu; VT: Li Linxi; UB: Zhou Linlin; BB: Luo Youjuan; FX: Lou Youjuan
September 16–20	(Russia) Penza	Russian Cup	TF: Moscow; Senior AA: Daria Spiridonova; Junior AA: Angelina Melnikova; VT: Maria Paseka; UB: Alla Sosnitskaya; BB: Maria Kharenkova; FX: Ksenia Afanasyeva
September 17–20	(Croatia) Osijek	Osijek World Cup	VT: (Puerto Rico) Paula Mejias; UB: (United Kingdom) Ruby Harrold; BB: (Brazil) Jade Barbosa; FX: (Puerto Rico) Paula Mejias
September 18–20	(Republic of Ireland) Limerick	Northern European Championships	TF: Wales; AA: Latalia Bevan; VT: (Iceland) Norma Róbertsdóttir; UB: (Iceland) Irina Sazonova; BB: Latalia Bevan; FX: Latalia Bevan
September 19–20	(Germany) Giessen	German National Championships	AA: Elisabeth Seitz; VT: Pauline Schäfer; UB: Elisabeth Seitz; BB: Pauline Schäfer; FX: Marlene Bindig and Leah Geisser
September 22–23	(Japan) Yokohama	Junior Japan International	AA: (United States) Laurie Hernandez; VT: (United States) Laurie Hernandez and (Japan) Kiko Kuwajima; UB: (Russia) Anastasia Ilyankova; BB: (China) Liu Tingting; FX: (United States) Laurie Hernandez
September 24–27	(Romania) Bucharest	Romanian National Championships	AA: Larisa Iordache; VT: Denisa Golgota; UB: Larisa Iordache; BB: Larisa Iordache; FX: Larisa Iordache
September 26–27	(Hungary) Szombathely	Hungarian Grand Prix	AA: (Hungary) Dorina Böczögő; VT: (Hungary) Boglárka Dévai; UB: (United Kingdom) Tyesha Mattis; BB: (Greece) Vasiliki Millousi; FX: (Hungary) Dorina Böczögő
September 26–27	(Italy) Turin	Italian National Championships	AA: Tea Ugrin; VT: Sofia Busato; UB: Martina Rizzelli; BB: Carlotta Ferlito; FX: Erika Fasana
October 10	(Italy) Novara	Novara Cup	TF: Romania; AA: Larisa Iordache; VT: Larisa Iordache; UB: Larisa Iordache; BB: Larisa Iordache; FX: Larisa Iordache
October 18–27	(China) Fuzhou	Chinese National Youth Games	TF: Ningbo; AA: Liu Tingting; VT: Liu Jinru; UB: Liu Tingting; BB: Liu Tingting; FX: Lu Yufei
October 23 – November 1	(United Kingdom) Glasgow	World Championships	TF: United States; AA: Simone Biles; VT: (Russia) Maria Paseka; UB: (China) Fan Yilin, (Russia) Viktoria Komova, (Russia) Daria Spiridonova, and Madison Kocian; BB: Simone Biles; FX: Simone Biles
November 4	(Switzerland) Morges	Arthur Gander Memorial	(Romania) Larisa Iordache
November 7	(Czech Republic) Liberec	Olympic Hopes Cup	TF: Great Britain; AA: (United Kingdom) Alice Kinsella
November 8	(Switzerland) Zürich	Swiss Cup	(Ukraine) Angelina Kysla and Oleg Verniaiev
November 17–22	(Brazil) Belo Horizonte	Brazilian National Championships	TF: Paraná – CEGIN; AA: Lorrane Oliveira; VT: Letícia Costa; UB: Lorrane Oliveira; BB: Jade Barbosa; FX: Lorrane Oliveira
November 20–22	(France) Marseille	Elite Gym Massilia	TF: France; Master AA: (Russia) Angelina Melnikova; Master VT: (Romania) Laura Jurca; Master UB: (Russia) Natalia Kapitonova; Master BB: (Romania) Laura Jurca; Master FX: (Romania) Diana Bulimar; Open AA: Juliette Bossu
November 8	(Czech Republic) Brno	Sokol Grand Prix	(Hungary) Dorina Böczögő and Levente Vagner
November 28–29	(Belgium) Charleroi	Top Gym	AA: (Belgium) Axelle Klinckaert; VT: (Belgium) Axelle Klinckaert; UB: (France) Alison Lepin; BB: (Russia) Angelina Simakova; FX: (Belgium) Axelle Klinckaert
November 28–29	Mexico City	Mexican Open	AA: (Canada) Isabela Onyshko
November 30 – December 6	(Russia)	Russian Hopes	
December 7–12	(Russia)	Olympic Hopes	
December 11–12	(France) Arques	Tournoi International du Pas-de-Calais	Senior AA: (Wales) Rebecca Moore; Junior AA: (Russia) Elena Eremina; Youth AA: (Russia) Alena Belomoeva; VT: (Russia) Elena Eremina; UB: (Russia) Elena Eremina; BB: (Russia) Elena Eremina; FX: (Russia) Lilia Akhaimova
December 12–13	(Japan) Toyota City	Toyota International Cup	VT: (Russia) Maria Paseka; UB: (Russia) Daria Spiridonova; BB: (Russia) Viktoria Komova; FX: (Russia) Ksenia Afanasyeva
December 13–17	(Russia) Moscow	Voronin Cup	Senior AA: (Russia) Maria Kharenkova; Senior VT: (Russia) Alla Sosnitskaya; Senior UB: (Russia) Maria Kharenkova; Senior BB: (Russia) Maria Kharenkova; Senior FX: (Russia) Seda Tutkhalyan; Junior AA: (Russia) Natalia Kapitonova; Junior VT: (Russia) Angelina Melnikova; Junior UB: (Russia) Natalia Kapitonova; Junior BB: (Russia) Natalia Kapitonova; Junior FX: (Russia) Angelina Melnikova; Team: (Russia) Maria Kharenkova and (Russia) Angelina Melnikova

== International Medalists (WAG) ==
=== Major Competitions ===
==== International Championships ====
World Championships
Competition	Event	Gold	Silver	Bronze
World Championships	Team	United States	China	Great Britain
World Championships	All-Around	(United States) Simone Biles	(United States) Gabby Douglas	(Romania) Larisa Iordache
World Championships	Vault	(Russia) Maria Paseka	(North Korea) Hong Un-jong	(United States) Simone Biles
World Championships	Uneven Bars	(China) Fan Yilin (Russia) Viktoria Komova (Russia) Daria Spiridonova (United States) Madison Kocian	—N/a	—N/a
World Championships	Balance Beam	(United States) Simone Biles	(Netherlands) Sanne Wevers	(Germany) Pauline Schäfer
World Championships	Floor Exercise	(United States) Simone Biles	(Russia) Ksenia Afanasyeva	(United States) Maggie Nichols

==== Multi-sport Games ====
Continental Games
Competition	Event	Gold	Silver	Bronze
Games of the Small States of Europe	Team	Iceland	Malta	Luxembourg
Games of the Small States of Europe	All-Around	(Iceland) Dominiqua Belanyi	(Iceland) Thelma Hermannsdottir	(Luxembourg) Lisa Pastoret
Games of the Small States of Europe	Vault	(Iceland) Norma Róbertsdóttir	(Iceland) Sigríður Bergþórsdóttir	(Luxembourg) Lisa Pastoret
Games of the Small States of Europe	Uneven Bars	(Iceland) Dominiqua Belanyi	(Malta) Peppijna Dalli	(Monaco) Elodie Mont Roches
Games of the Small States of Europe	Balance Beam	(Iceland) Norma Róbertsdóttir	(Monaco) Milla Fabre	(Malta) Suzanne Buttigieg
Games of the Small States of Europe	Floor Exercise	(Iceland) Thelma Hermannsdottir	(Iceland) Sigríður Bergþórsdóttir	(Malta) Claire Azzopardi (Monaco) Elodie Mont Roches
Southeast Asian Games	Team	Malaysia	Singapore	Philippines
Southeast Asian Games	All-Around	(Vietnam) Phan Thị Hà Thanh	(Malaysia) Farah Ann Abdul Hadi	(Singapore) Nadine Nathan
Southeast Asian Games	Vault	(Vietnam) Phan Thị Hà Thanh	(Malaysia) Ing Yueh Tan	(Malaysia) Farah Ann Abdul Hadi
Southeast Asian Games	Uneven Bars	(Malaysia) Ing Yueh Tan	(Philippines) Ava Verdeflor	(Malaysia) Farah Ann Abdul Hadi
Southeast Asian Games	Balance Beam	(Vietnam) Phan Thị Hà Thanh	(Vietnam) Do Thi Van Anh	(Malaysia) Farah Ann Abdul Hadi
Southeast Asian Games	Floor Exercise	(Malaysia) Farah Ann Abdul Hadi	(Indonesia) Rifda Irfanalutfi	(Vietnam) Phan Thị Hà Thanh
European Games	Team	Russia	Germany	Netherlands
European Games	All-Around	(Russia) Aliya Mustafina	(Switzerland) Giulia Steingruber	(Netherlands) Lieke Wevers
European Games	Vault	(Switzerland) Giulia Steingruber	(Russia) Seda Tutkhalyan	(Netherlands) Lisa Top
European Games	Uneven Bars	(Russia) Aliya Mustafina	(Germany) Sophie Scheder	(Romania) Andreea Iridon
European Games	Balance Beam	(Netherlands) Lieke Wevers	(Romania) Andreea Iridon	(Switzerland) Giulia Steingruber
European Games	Floor Exercise	(Switzerland) Giulia Steingruber	(Russia) Aliya Mustafina	(Netherlands) Lieke Wevers
Pan American Games	Team	United States	Canada	Brazil
Pan American Games	All-Around	(Canada) Ellie Black	(United States) Madison Desch	(Brazil) Flávia Saraiva
Pan American Games	Vault	(Cuba) Marcia Videaux	(Dominican Republic) Yamilet Peña	(Canada) Ellie Black
Pan American Games	Uneven Bars	(United States) Rachel Gowey	(Venezuela) Jessica López	(United States) Amelia Hundley
Pan American Games	Balance Beam	(Canada) Ellie Black	(United States) Megan Skaggs	(Canada) Victoria-Kayen Woo
Pan American Games	Floor Exercise	(Canada) Ellie Black	(United States) Amelia Hundley	(Guatemala) Ana Sofía Gómez
European Youth Summer Olympic Festival	Team	Russia	Belgium	Germany
European Youth Summer Olympic Festival	All-Around	(Russia) Daria Skrypnik	(Belgium) Axelle Klinckaert	(Russia) Anastasia Ilyankova
European Youth Summer Olympic Festival	Vault	(France) Marine Boyer	(Russia) Daria Skrypnik	(Russia) Elena Eremina
European Youth Summer Olympic Festival	Uneven Bars	(Russia) Daria Skrypnik	(Belgium) Nina Derwael	(Russia) Anastasia Ilyankova
European Youth Summer Olympic Festival	Balance Beam	(Belgium) Axelle Klinckaert	(United Kingdom) Maisie Methuen	(Russia) Daria Skrypnik
European Youth Summer Olympic Festival	Floor Exercise	(Belgium) Axelle Klinckaert	(Russia) Daria Skrypnik	(Belgium) Nina Derwael
International
Competition	Event	Gold	Silver	Bronze
Summer Universiade	Team	Russia	Japan	South Korea
Summer Universiade	All-Around	(United Kingdom) Kelly Simm	(Japan) Asuka Teramoto	(Japan) Natsumi Sasada
Summer Universiade	Vault	(Russia) Maria Paseka	(United Kingdom) Kelly Simm	(Russia) Daria Elizarova
Summer Universiade	Uneven Bars	(Russia) Ekaterina Kramarenko	(Japan) Asuka Teramoto	(Russia) Maria Paseka
Summer Universiade	Balance Beam	(Japan) Yu Minobe	(Russia) Polina Fedorova	(Portugal) Ana Filipa Martins
Summer Universiade	Floor Exercise	(Russia) Polina Fedorova	(Russia) Daria Elizarova	(United Kingdom) Kelly Simm

==== Continental Championships ====
Continental Championships
Competition	Event	Gold	Silver	Bronze
European	All-Around	(Switzerland) Giulia Steingruber	(Russia) Maria Kharenkova	(United Kingdom) Ellie Downie
European	Vault	(Russia) Maria Paseka	(Switzerland) Giulia Steingruber	(Russia) Ksenia Afanasyeva
European	Uneven Bars	(Russia) Daria Spiridonova	(United Kingdom) Becky Downie	(Netherlands) Sanne Wevers
European	Balance Beam	(Romania) Andreea Munteanu	(United Kingdom) Becky Downie	(France) Claire Martin
European	Floor Exercise	(Russia) Ksenia Afanasyeva	(United Kingdom) Claudia Fragapane	(Switzerland) Giulia Steingruber
South American	Team	Brazil	Argentina; Colombia	—N/a
South American	All-Around	(Brazil) Daniele Hypólito	(Brazil) Leticia Costa	(Colombia) Yurany Avendaño
South American	Vault	(Brazil) Daniele Hypólito	(Chile) Franchesca Santi	(Colombia) Yurany Avendaño
South American	Uneven Bars	(Brazil) Jade Barbosa	(Argentina) Ailen Valente	(Colombia) Yurany Avendaño
South American	Balance Beam	(Brazil) Daniele Hypólito	(Colombia) Marcela Sandoval	(Brazil) Leticia Costa
South American	Floor Exercise	(Brazil) Leticia Costa	(Brazil) Daniele Hypólito	(Argentina) Paloma Guerrero
Asian	Team	Japan	China	South Korea
Asian	All-Around	(Japan) Aiko Sugihara	(China) Wang Yan	(Japan) Asuka Teramoto
Asian	Vault	(China) Wang Yan	(Japan) Sae Miyakawa	(India) Dipa Karmakar
Asian	Uneven Bars	(China) Zhu Xiaofang	(Japan) Aiko Sugihara	(China) Fan Yilin
Asian	Balance Beam	(China) Fan Yilin	(Japan) Asuka Teramoto	(China) Wang Yan
Asian	Floor Exercise	(China) Wang Yan	(Japan) Aiko Sugihara	(Japan) Sae Miyakawa
All-Africa Games	Team	South Africa	Egypt	Algeria
All-Africa Games	All-Around	(South Africa) Kirsten Beckett	(Egypt) Nancy Taman	(Algeria) Farah Boufadene
All-Africa Games	Vault	(Algeria) Farah Boufadene	(South Africa) Claudia Cummins	(Egypt) Nancy Taman
All-Africa Games	Uneven Bars	(Algeria) Farah Boufadene	(South Africa) Kirsten Beckett	(South Africa) Tylah Lotter
All-Africa Games	Balance Beam	(South Africa) Kirsten Beckett	(South Africa) Angela Maguire	(Algeria) Farah Boufadene
All-Africa Games	Floor Exercise	—N/a	—N/a	—N/a

=== World Cup Series ===
FIG World Cup
Competition	Event	Gold	Silver	Bronze
(United States) American Cup	All-Around	(United States) Simone Biles	(United States) Mykayla Skinner	(Italy) Erika Fasana
(Germany) Cottbus	Vault	(Uzbekistan) Oksana Chusovitina	(Slovenia) Tjaša Kysselef	(Slovenia) Teja Belak
(Germany) Cottbus	Uneven Bars	(Sweden) Jonna Adlerteg	(Azerbaijan) Kristina Pravdina	(Portugal) Ana Filipa Martins
(Germany) Cottbus	Balance Beam	(Romania) Andreea Munteanu	(Germany) Kim Janas	(Spain) Ana Pérez
(Germany) Cottbus	Floor Exercise	(Poland) Marta Pihan-Kulesza	(Romania) Andreea Munteanu	(Portugal) Ana Filipa Martins
(Qatar) Doha	Vault	(Switzerland) Giulia Steingruber	(Vietnam) Phan Thị Hà Thanh	(Slovenia) Teja Belak
(Qatar) Doha	Uneven Bars	(France) Youna Dufournet	(Romania) Diana Bulimar	(Switzerland) Jessica Diacci
(Qatar) Doha	Balance Beam	(Vietnam) Phan Thị Hà Thanh	(Switzerland) Giulia Steingruber	(Romania) Diana Bulimar
(Qatar) Doha	Floor Exercise	(Switzerland) Giulia Steingruber	(Romania) Laura Jurca	(Switzerland) Ilaria Käslin
(Slovenia) Ljubljana	Vault	(Uzbekistan) Oksana Chusovitina	(Slovenia) Teja Belak	(Netherlands) Noël van Klaveren
(Slovenia) Ljubljana	Uneven Bars	(Canada) Isabela Onyshko	(Sweden) Jonna Adlerteg	(Brazil) Rebeca Andrade
(Slovenia) Ljubljana	Balance Beam	(Canada) Isabela Onyshko	(Brazil) Lorrane Oliveira	(Brazil) Julie Kim Sinmon
(Slovenia) Ljubljana	Floor Exercise	(Netherlands) Eythora Thorsdottir	(Canada) Isabela Onyshko	(Argentina) Ayelen Tarabini
(Brazil) São Paulo	Vault	(China) Deng Yalan	(Brazil) Rebeca Andrade	(Chile) Franchesca Santi
(Brazil) São Paulo	Uneven Bars	(China) Shang Chunsong	(Germany) Sophie Scheder	(Germany) Elisabeth Seitz
(Brazil) São Paulo	Balance Beam	(China) Shang Chunsong	(Brazil) Flávia Saraiva	(Germany) Sophie Scheder
(Brazil) São Paulo	Floor Exercise	(Brazil) Flávia Saraiva	(Germany) Elisabeth Seitz	(Germany) Leah Griesser
(Bulgaria) Varna	Vault	(Uzbekistan) Oksana Chusovitina	(Slovenia) Teja Belak	(Switzerland) Giulia Steingruber
(Bulgaria) Varna	Uneven Bars	(North Korea) Kang Yong-mi	(France) Youna Dufournet	(Switzerland) Giulia Steingruber
(Bulgaria) Varna	Balance Beam	(Vietnam) Phan Thị Hà Thanh	(North Korea) Kim Un-hyang	(Switzerland) Ilaria Käslin
(Bulgaria) Varna	Floor Exercise	(Switzerland) Ilaria Käslin	(Panama) Isabella Amado	(Peru) Mariana Chiarella
(Portugal) Anadia	Vault	(Cuba) Marcia Videaux	(Mexico) Alexa Moreno	(Chile) Makarena Pinto
(Portugal) Anadia	Uneven Bars	(Venezuela) Jessica López	(Portugal) Ana Filipa Martins	(Cuba) Marcia Videaux
(Portugal) Anadia	Balance Beam	(Sweden) Emma Larsson	(Argentina) Ayelen Tarabini	(Israel) Tzuf Feldon (New Zealand) Charlotte Sullivan
(Portugal) Anadia	Floor Exercise	(Hungary) Dorina Böczögő	(Argentina) Ayelen Tarabini	(Slovenia) Saša Golob
(Croatia) Osijek	Vault	(Puerto Rico) Paula Mejias	(Hungary) Boglárka Dévai	(Chile) Franchesca Santi
(Croatia) Osijek	Uneven Bars	(United Kingdom) Ruby Harrold	(Finland) Annika Urvikko	(Brazil) Thauany Araújo
(Croatia) Osijek	Balance Beam	(Brazil) Jade Barbosa	(Hungary) Dorina Böczögő	(Panama) Isabella Amado
(Croatia) Osijek	Floor Exercise	(Puerto Rico) Paula Mejias	(Hungary) Tünde Csillag (Cuba) Marcia Videaux	—N/a

=== National Championships ===
Note: Although England, Scotland, and Wales are listed as individual countries in the table below, gymnasts from these countries compete under the flag of Great Britain at all major international competitions, except for the Commonwealth Games.

National Championships
Nation	Event	Gold	Silver	Bronze
Australia	All-Around	Senior: Georgia Godwin; Junior: Emily Whitehead	Senior: Emily Little; Junior: Talia Folino	Senior: Madelaine Leydin; Junior: Charleis Kingston-White
Australia	Vault	Senior: Emily Little; Junior: Talia Folino	Senior: Stephanie Magiros; Junior: Yasmin Collier	Senior: Madelaine Leydin; Junior: Emily Whitehead
Australia	Uneven Bars	Senior: Rianna Mizzen; Junior: Emily Whitehead	Senior: Madelaine Leydin; Junior: Talia Folino	Senior: Georgia Godwin; Junior: Yasmin Collier
Australia	Balance Beam	Senior: Georgia Godwin; Junior: Talia Folino	Senior: Emily Little; Junior: Emily Whitehead	Senior: Madelaine Leydin; Junior: Charleis Kingston-White
Australia	Floor Exercise	Senior: Lauren Mitchell; Junior: Emily Whitehead	Senior: Emily Little; Junior: Talia Folino	Senior: Madelaine Leydin; Junior: Charleis Kingston-White
Belgium	All-Around	Senior: Cindy Vandenhole; Junior: Nina Derwael; Espoir: Imke Wolthuzien	Senior: Gaelle Mys; Junior: Senna Deriks; Espoir: Oriane Jungers	Senior: Lisa Verschueren; Junior: Julie Meyers; Espoir: Alysha Senders
Brazil	All-Around	Senior: Lorrane Oliveira; Junior: Carolyne Pedro	Senior: Jade Barbosa; Junior: Luísa Kirchmayer	Senior: Letícia Costa; Junior: Luana Silva and Jackelyne Silva
Brazil	Vault	Letícia Costa	Thayse Silva	Isabelle Cruz
Brazil	Uneven Bars	Lorrane Oliveira	Letícia Costa	Jade Barbosa
Brazil	Balance Beam	Jade Barbosa	Isabel Barbosa	Lorrane Oliveira
Brazil	Floor Exercise	Lorrane Oliveira	Thayse Silva	Carolyne Pedro
Canada	All-Around	Senior: Ellie Black; Junior: Megan Roberts	Senior: Isabela Onyshko; Junior: Jade Chrobok	Senior: Rose-Kaying Woo; Junior: Meixi Semple
Canada	Vault	Senior: Shallon Olsen; Junior: Megan Roberts	Senior: Rose-Kaying Woo; Junior: Jade Chrobok	Senior: Maegan Chant; Junior: Laurie Denommee and Meixi Semple
Canada	Uneven Bars	Senior: Isabela Onyshko; Junior: Jade Chrobok	Senior: Ellie Black; Junior: Megan Roberts	Senior: Madison Copiak and Victoria-Kayen Woo; Junior: Meaghan Ruttan
Canada	Balance Beam	Senior: Ellie Black; Junior: Meixi Semple	Senior: Isabela Onyshko; Junior: Meaghan Ruttan	Senior: Rose-Kaying Woo; Junior: Alyson Arcand and Madeline McLellan
Canada	Floor Exercise	Senior: Isabela Onyshko; Junior: Megan Roberts	Senior: Maegan Chant; Junior: Jade Chrobok	Senior: Ellie Black; Junior: Meixi Semple
China	All-Around	Senior: Shang Chunsong; Junior: Liu Tingting	Senior: Wang Yan; Junior: Luo Huan	Senior: Chen Siyi; Junior: Lu Yufei
China	Vault	Senior: Wang Yan; Junior: Liu Jinru	Senior: Li Linxi; Junior: Zhang Jin	Senior: Liu Jinru; Junior: Liu Tingting
China	Uneven Bars	Senior: Fan Yilin; Junior: Luo Huan	Senior: Huang Huidan; Junior: Liu Tingting	Senior: Zhu Xiaofang; Junior: Zhou Linlin
China	Balance Beam	Senior: Shang Chunsong; Junior: Liu Tingting	Senior: Luo Youjuan; Junior: Li Qi	Senior: Fan Yilin; Junior: Zhang Jin
China	Floor Exercise	Senior: Wang Yan; Junior: Lu Yufei	Senior: Shang Chunsong; Junior: Li Qi	Senior: Luo Huan; Junior: Zhang Jin
England	All-Around	Senior: Amy Tinkler; Junior: Catherine Lyons; Espoir: Chiara Bunce	Senior: Claudia Fragapane; Junior: Phoebe Turner; Espoir: Amelie Morgan	Senior: Kelly Simm; Junior: Alice Kinsella; Espoir: Isabel Davis
England	Vault	Senior: Claudia Fragapane; Junior: Catherine Lyons; Espoir: Annabel Agba	Senior: Kelly Simm; Junior: Sophie Scott; Espoir: Laura Kaletha	Senior: Lisa Mason; Junior: Lucy Stanhope; Espoir: Teri Williams
England	Uneven Bars	Senior: Becky Downie; Junior: Alice Kinsella; Espoir: Chiara Bunce	Senior: Claudia Fragapane, Amy Tinkler, and Tyesha Mattis; Junior: Lucy Stanhope; Espoir: Courtney Burton	Senior: N/A; Junior: Megan Parker; Espoir: Isabel Davis
England	Balance Beam	Senior: Amy Tinkler; Junior: Catherine Lyons; Espoir: Amelie Morgan	Senior: Ellie Downie; Junior: Phoebe Turner; Espoir: Chiara Bunce	Senior: Claudia Fragapane; Junior: Lucy Stanhope; Espoir: Mia Scott
England	Floor Exercise	Senior: Kelly Simm; Junior: Catherine Lyons; Espoir: Isabel Davis	Senior: Lisa Mason; Junior: Georgia-Mae Fenton; Espoir: Caitlin Williams	Senior: Amy Tinkler; Junior: Amelia Montague; Espoir: Hallie Copperwheat
Finland	All-Around	Senior: Annika Urvikko; Junior: Riina Kaleva	Senior: Rosanna Ojala; Junior: Helmi Murto	Senior: Maija Leinonen; Junior: Siiri Saukkonen
Finland	Vault	Senior: Annika Urvikko; Junior: Riina Kaleva	Senior: Rosanna Ojala; Junior: Alessa Anttalainen	Senior: Maija Leinonen; Junior: Cassandra Kapanen
Finland	Uneven Bars	Senior: Annika Urvikko; Junior: Isabella Ahlblad	Senior: Maija Leinonen; Junior: Helmi Murto	Senior: Elina Ahmala; Junior: Riina Kaleva
Finland	Balance Beam	Senior: Agnes Suto; Junior: Helmi Murto	Senior: Maija Leinonen; Junior: Riina Kaleva	Senior: Rosanna Ojala; Junior: Siiri Hakopää
Finland	Floor Exercise	Senior: Annika Urvikko; Junior: Riina Kaleva	Senior: Monica Sileoni; Junior: Helmi Murto	Senior: Veronika Vuosjoki; Junior: Wilma Malin
France	All-Around	Senior: Loan His; Junior: Lorette Charpy	Senior: Louise Vanhille; Junior: Melanie Dos Santos	Senior: Marine Brevet; Junior: Océane Pausé
France	Vault	Camille Bahl	Coline Devillard	Manon Strosberg
France	Uneven Bars	Louise Vanhille	Marine Boyer	Lorette Charpy
France	Balance Beam	Marine Boyer	Claire Martin	Lorette Charpy
France	Floor Exercise	Loan His	Claire Martin and Louise Vanhille	N/A
Germany	All-Around	Senior: Elisabeth Seitz; Junior: Tabea Alt	Senior: Pauline Schäfer; Junior: Rebecca Matzon	Senior: Sophie Scheder; Junior: Florine Harder
Germany	Vault	Senior: Pauline Schäfer; Junior: Tabea Alt	Senior: Pauline Tratz; Junior: Amélie Föllinger	Senior: Nicole Fritz; Junior: Florine Harder
Germany	Uneven Bars	Senior: Elisabeth Seitz; Junior: Tabea Alt and Maike Enderle	Senior: Sophie Scheder; Junior: N/A	Senior: Lisa Katharina Hill; Junior: Florine Harder
Germany	Balance Beam	Senior: Pauline Schäfer; Junior: Tabea Alt	Senior: Elisabeth Seitz; Junior: Rebecca Matzon	Senior: Sophie Scheder; Junior: Carina Kröll
Germany	Floor Exercise	Senior: Marlene Bindig and Leah Greisser; Junior: Amélie Föllinger	Senior: N/A; Junior: Rebecca Matzon	Senior: Pauline Tratz; Junior: Tabea Alt
Great Britain	All-Around	Senior: Amy Tinkler; Junior: Catherine Lyons	Senior: Claudia Fragapane; Junior: Maisie Methuen	Senior: Ellie Downie; Junior: Georgia-Mae Fenton
Great Britain	Vault	Senior: Claudia Fragapane; Junior: Catherine Lyons	Senior: Ellie Downie and Kelly Simm; Junior: Lucy Stanhope	Senior: N/A; Junior: Jenna Arnot
Great Britain	Uneven Bars	Senior: Tyesha Mattis; Junior: Georgia-Mae Fenton	Senior: Ellie Downie; Junior: Catherine Lyons	Senior: Claudia Fragapane; Junior: Maisie Methuen
Great Britain	Balance Beam	Senior: Tyesha Mattis; Junior: Catherine Lyons	Senior: Georgina Hockenhull; Junior: Maisie Methuen	Senior: Claudia Fragapane; Junior: Louise McColgan
Great Britain	Floor Exercise	Senior: Amy Tinkler; Junior: Catherine Lyons	Senior: Claudia Fragapane; Junior: Louise McColgan	Senior: Lisa Mason; Junior: Maisie Methuen
Hungary	Vault	Boglárka Dévai	Kitti Honti	Dália Al-Salty
Hungary	Uneven Bars	Dorina Böczögő	Kitti Honti	Noémi Makra
Hungary	Balance Beam	Dorina Böczögő	Enikő Horváth	Dália Al-Salty
Hungary	Floor Exercise	Dorina Böczögő and Tünde Csillag	N/A	Boglárka Dévai
Italy	All-Around	Tea Ugrin	Elisa Meneghini	Erika Fasana
Italy	Vault	Sofia Busato	Adriana Crisci	Desirée Carofiglio
Italy	Uneven Bars	Martina Rizzelli	Giorgia Campana and Giada Grisetti	N/A
Italy	Balance Beam	Carlotta Ferlito	Lara Mori	Elisa Meneghini
Italy	Floor Exercise	Erika Fasana	Elisa Meneghini	Carlotta Ferlito
Japan	All-Around	Asuka Teramoto	Yuki Uchiyama	Aiko Sugihara
Japan	Vault	Sae Miyakawa	Shima Himeko	Mai Murakami
Japan	Uneven Bars	Asuka Teramoto	Honoka Koga	Yumika Nakamura
Japan	Balance Beam	Yu Minobe	Shima Himeko	Aiko Sugihara
Japan	Floor Exercise	Mai Murakami	Aiko Sugihara; Yuki Uchiyama	N/A
Mexico	All-Around	Elsa García	Ana Lago	Alexa Moreno
Mexico	Vault	Elsa García	Karla Torres	Ana Lago
Mexico	Uneven Bars	Elsa García	Alexa Moreno	Karla Hernandez
Mexico	Balance Beam	Elsa García	Ana Lago	Alexa Moreno
Mexico	Floor Exercise	Elsa García	Ana Lago	Alexa Moreno
Portugal	All-Around	Senior: Ana Filipa Martins; Junior: Mariana Marianito	Senior: Mariana Pitrez; Junior: Rita Araújo	Senior: Inês Romero; Junior: Leonor Feijó
Romania	All-Around	Larisa Iordache	Anamaria Ocolișan	Diana Bulimar
Romania	Vault	Denisa Golgota	Alexandra Mihai	Olivia Cîmpian
Romania	Uneven Bars	Larisa Iordache	Laura Jurca	Olivia Cîmpian
Romania	Balance Beam	Larisa Iordache	Diana Bulimar	Anamaria Ocolișan
Romania	Floor Exercise	Larisa Iordache	Silvia Zarzu	Laura Jurca
Russia	All-Around	Senior: Maria Kharenkova; Junior (MS): Daria Skrypnik; Junior (CMS): Angelina Simakova	Senior: Alla Sosnitskaya; Junior (MS): Angelina Melnikova; Junior (CMS): Valeria Saifulina	Senior: Seda Tutkhalyan; Junior (MS): Ekaterina Sokova; Junior (CMS): Varvara Zubova
Russia	Vault	Senior: Alla Sosnitskaya; Junior (MS): Elena Eremina; Junior (CMS): Angelina Simakova	Senior: Maria Paseka; Junior (MS): Elizaveta Kochetkova; Junior (CMS): Valeria Saifulina	Senior: Seda Tutkhalyan; Junior (MS): Inga Galeeva; Junior (CMS): Viktoria Gorbatova
Russia	Uneven Bars	Senior: Daria Spiridonova; Junior (MS): Daria Skrypnik; Junior (CMS): Yuliana Perebinosova	Senior: Ekaterina Kramarenko; Junior (MS): Natalia Kapitonova; Junior (CMS): Angelina Simakova	Senior: Maria Paseka; Junior (MS): Elena Eremina; Junior (CMS): Polina Borzykh
Russia	Balance Beam	Senior: Maria Kharenkova; Junior (MS): Angelina Melnikova; Junior (CMS): Varvara Zubova	Senior: Daria Spiridonova; Junior (MS): Elena Eremina; Junior (CMS): Angelina Simakova	Senior: Seda Tutkhalyan; Junior (MS): Ekaterina Sokova; Junior (CMS): Polina Borzykh and Viktoria Gorbatova
Russia	Floor Exercise	Senior: Ksenia Afanasyeva; Junior (MS): Ekaterina Sokova; Junior (CMS): Viktoria Gorbatova and Angelina Simakova	Senior: Evgenia Shelgunova; Junior (MS): Angelina Melnikova; Junior (CMS): N/A	Senior: Maria Kharenkova; Junior (MS): Daria Skrypnik; Junior (CMS): Valeria Saifulina
Scotland	All-Around	Senior: Amy Regan; Junior: Louise McColgan; Espoir: Isla Warr	Senior: Izzy Tolometti; Junior: Sofia Ramzan; Espoir: Laura-Jane Core	Senior: Megan Wright; Junior: Sarah McKenzie; Espoir: Kacey Morrison
Scotland	Vault	Senior: Amy Regan; Junior: Louise McColgan; Espoir: Erin Gallacher	Senior: Rebecca Dunn; Junior: Sofia Ramzan; Espoir: Ellie Russell	Senior: N/A; Junior: Sarah McKenzie; Espoir: Laura-Jane Core
Scotland	Uneven Bars	Senior: Amy Regan; Junior: Louise McColgan; Espoir: Laura-Jane Core	Senior: Izzy Tolometti; Junior: Sofia Ramzan; Espoir: Isla Warr	Senior: Gaynor McGiffen; Junior: Lucy Orr; Espoir: Ellie Breadner
Scotland	Balance Beam	Senior: Amy Regan and Megan Wright; Junior: Louise McColgan; Espoir: Isla Warr	Senior: N/A; Junior: Sofia Ramzan; Espoir: Emily Bremner	Senior: Gaynor McGiffen; Junior: Sarah McKenzie; Espoir: Erin Gallacher
Scotland	Floor Exercise	Senior: Amy Regan; Junior: Louise McColgan; Espoir: Kacey Morrison	Senior: Shannon Archer; Junior: Sofia Ramzan and Sarah McKenzie; Espoir: Ellie Breadner	Senior: Izzy Tolometti and Megan Wright; Junior: N/A; Espoir: Eilish Campbell
Sweden	All-Around	Senior: Marcela Torres; Junior: Sofie Emilson	Senior: Lovisa Estberg; Junior: Alva Eriksson	Senior: Julia Rumbutis; Junior: Agnes Åkerman
United States	All-Around	Senior: Simone Biles; Junior: Laurie Hernandez	Senior: Maggie Nichols; Junior: Jazmyn Foberg	Senior: Aly Raisman; Junior: Ragan Smith
United States	Vault	Senior: Simone Biles; Junior: Jordan Chiles	Senior: Mykayla Skinner; Junior: Jazmyn Foberg	Senior: N/A; Junior: Emily Gaskins and Laurie Hernandez
United States	Uneven Bars	Senior: Madison Kocian; Junior: Laurie Hernandez	Senior: Ashton Locklear; Junior: Jazmyn Foberg	Senior: Bailie Key; Junior: Alyona Shchennikova
United States	Balance Beam	Senior: Simone Biles; Junior: Ragan Smith	Senior: Alyssa Baumann; Junior: Jazmyn Foberg	Senior: Kyla Ross; Junior: Laurie Hernandez
United States	Floor Exercise	Senior: Aly Raisman; Junior: Ragan Smith	Senior: Simone Biles; Junior: Laurie Hernandez	Senior: Bailie Key and Mykayla Skinner; Junior: Christina Desiderio
Wales	All-Around	Senior: Raer Theaker; Junior: Maisie Methuen	Senior: Rebecca Moore; Junior: Latalia Bevan	Senior: N/A; Junior: Holly Jones
Wales	Vault	Senior: Raer Theaker; Junior: Maisie Methuen	Senior: Rebecca Moore; Junior: Holly Jones	Senior: N/A; Junior: Hana Davies and Harriet O'Sullivan
Wales	Uneven Bars	Senior: Raer Theaker; Junior: Latalia Bevan	Senior: Rebecca Moore; Junior: Maisie Methuen	Senior: Angel Romaeo; Junior: Holly Jones
Wales	Balance Beam	Senior: Raer Theaker; Junior: Maisie Methuen	Senior: Rebecca Moore; Junior: Latalia Bevan	Senior: N/A; Junior: Harriet Moore
Wales	Floor Exercise	Senior: Raer Theaker; Junior: Maisie Methuen	Senior: Rebecca Moore; Junior: Holly Jones	Senior: N/A; Junior: Hana Davies

== Season's best scores ==
Only the scores of senior gymnasts from international events have been included below; one score per gymnast.

=== Women's All-Around ===
Rank	Name	Country	Score	Event
1	Simone Biles	United States	62.299	American Cup
2	Bailie Key	United States	59.500	City of Jesolo Trophy AA
3	Gabby Douglas	United States	59.316	World Championships AA
4	Maggie Nichols	United States	59.232	World Championships TF
5	Larisa Iordache	Romania	59.107	World Championships AA
6	Aly Raisman	United States	59.100	City of Jesolo Trophy AA
7	Aliya Mustafina	Russia	58.865	European Games TF
8	Alyssa Baumann	United States	58.700	City of Jesolo Trophy AA
9	Shang Chunsong	China	58.265	World Championships AA
10	Ellie Black	Canada	58.150	Pan American Games AA
11	Aiko Sugihara	Japan	58.050	Asian Championships AA
12	Wang Yan	China	58.000	Asian Championships AA
13	Giulia Steingruber	Switzerland	57.873	European Championships AA
14	MyKayla Skinner	United States	57.832	American Cup
15	Asuka Teramoto	Japan	57.750	Asian Championships AA
16	Chen Siyi	China	57.700	Asian Championships AA
17	Maria Kharenkova	Russia	57.698	European Championships QF
18	Amelia Hundley	United States	57.650	Pan American Games TF
19	Erika Fasana	Italy	57.550	City of Jesolo Trophy AA
20	Madison Desch	United States	57.450	Pan American Games AA

=== Women's Vault ===
Rank	Name	Country	Score	Event
1	Simone Biles	United States	15.825	U.S. Championships Day 2
2	Maria Paseka	Russia	15.666	World Championships EF
3	Hong Un Jong	North Korea	15.633	World Championships EF
4	Giulia Steingruber	Switzerland	15.316	World Championships QF
5	Mykayla Skinner	United States	15.150	U.S. Championships Day 2
6	Alla Sosnitskaya	Russia	15.133	Russian Championships AA
7	Marcia Videaux	Cuba	15.112	Anadia World Cup EF
8	Mai Murakami	Japan	15.100	All Japan College Championships EF
9	Wang Yan	China	15.099	World Championships QF
10	Asuka Teramoto	Japan	15.050	All Japan College Championships EF
11	Mizuho Nagai	Japan	15.000	All Japan College Championships EF
12	Deng Yalan	China	14.962	São Paulo World Cup EF
13	Alexa Moreno	Mexico	14.950	Anadia World Cup QF
14	Ellie Downie	Great Britain	14.949	Worlds Championships QF
15	Emily Little	Australia	14.937	Australian Championships EF
16	Oksana Chusovitina	Uzbekistan	14.925	Ljubljana World Cup QF
16	Sae Miyakawa	Japan	14.925	All Japan Apparatus Championships EF
18	Dipa Karmakar	India	14.900	World Championships QF
19	Seda Tutkhalyan	Russia	14.884	Russian Championships AA
20	Ksenia Afanasyeva	Russia	14.866	Euros EF
20	Noël van Klaveren	Netherlands	14.866	1st Euros Trial

=== Women's Uneven Bars ===
Rank	Name	Country	Score	Event
1	Fan Yilin	China	15.650	Asian Championships TF
2	Madison Kocian	United States	15.600	U.S. Classic & U.S. Championships Day 2
3	Daria Spiridonova	Russia	15.533	Russian Championships TF
4	Aliya Mustafina	Russia	15.500	European Games AA
5	Viktoria Komova	Russia	15.467	Russian Cup AA
6	Elisabeth Seitz	Germany	15.466	German Nationals EF
7	Ashton Locklear	United States	15.450	U.S. Championships Day 2
8	Sophie Scheder	Germany	15.433	German Nationals EF
9	Gabby Douglas	United States	15.400	U.S. Classic
9	Yuki Uchiyama	Japan	15.400	Japanese Championships Day 1
11	Rachel Gowey	United States	15.350	U.S. Championships Day 1
11	Xie Yufen	China	15.350	WOGA Classic
13	Bailie Key	United States	15.300	U.S. Classic
13	Maria Paseka	Russia	15.300	Batumi International AA & Russian Cup TF
15	Kyla Ross	United States	15.250	Jesolo Trophy EF
16	Becky Downie	Great Britain	15.233	Euros QF&EF
16	Shang Chunsong	China	15.233	Worlds TF
18	Simone Biles	United States	15.200	American Cup
18	Koko Tsurumi	Japan	15.200	Japanese Championships Day 2
20	Brenna Dowell	United States	15.150	U.S. Championships Day 1

=== Women's Balance Beam ===
Rank	Name	Country	Score	Event
1	Simone Biles	United States	15.900	U.S. Championships Day 2
2	Larisa Iordache	Romania	15.625	Romanian Championships EF
3	Seda Tutkhalyan	Russia	15.600	Batumi International AA
4	Pauline Schäfer	Germany	15.466	German Nationals EF
5	Shang Chunsong	China	15.400	São Paulo World Cup EF
6	Maria Kharenkova	Russia	15.367	Russian Championships AA
7	Kyla Ross	United States	15.250	U.S. Championships Day 2
8	Sakura Yumoto	Japan	15.200	NHK Cup
9	Alyssa Baumann	United States	15.150	U.S. Championships Day 1
10	Flávia Saraiva	Brazil	15.100	São Paulo World Cup EF
10	Aly Raisman	United States	15.100	U.S. Classic
12	Ellie Black	Canada	15.050	Pan Am Games EF
12	Fan Yilin	China	15.050	Asian Championships TF
12	Carlotta Ferlito	Italy	15.050	Golden League AA
12	Mary-Anne Monckton	Australia	15.050	Australia-China Friendly AA
16	Viktoria Komova	Russia	15.000	Russian Championships AA
16	Yu Minobe	Japan	15.000	Japanese Championships Day 1
18	Asuka Teramoto	Japan	14.950	All Japan College Championships EF
18	Wang Yan	China	14.950	Asian Championships TF
20	Gabby Douglas	United States	14.900	Jesolo Trophy TF & U.S. Classic
20	Cătălina Ponor	Romania	14.900	ROU-FRA friendly
20	Koko Tsurumi	Japan	14.900	Japanese Championships Day 1

=== Women's Floor Exercise ===
Rank	Name	Country	Score	Event
1	Simone Biles	United States	16.050	Jesolo Trophy EF & U.S. Classic
2	Aly Raisman	United States	15.550	U.S. Championships Day 1
3	Larisa Iordache	Romania	15.200	Romanian Championships EF
4	Ksenia Afanasyeva	Russia	15.133	Russian Championships EF
5	Gabby Douglas	United States	15.000	U.S. Classic
5	Bailie Key	United States	15.000	Jesolo Trophy TF
5	Maggie Nichols	United States	15.000	World Championships TF&EF
8	Sae Miyakawa	Japan	14.950	Asian Championships TF
9	Shang Chunsong	China	14.933	World Championships EF
9	Mykayla Skinner	United States	14.933	American Cup
11	Erika Fasana	Italy	14.900	Jesolo Trophy EF
11	Claudia Fragapane	Great Britain	14.900	British Championships AA
13	Rebeca Andrade	Brazil	14.850	FIT Challenge QF
14	Daria Elizarova	Russia	14.800	Diyatin Cup EF
14	Silvia Zarzu	Romania	14.800	Romanian Championships AA
16	Ellie Downie	Great Britain	14.733	World Championships EF
17	Diana Bulimar	Romania	14.700	Romanian Championships AA
18	Madison Desch	United States	14.650	Pan Am Games TF
18	Flávia Saraiva	Brazil	14.650	Pan Am Games AA
20	Wang Yan	China	14.633	World Championships TF
