= Gymnastics at the 2011 Commonwealth Youth Games =

Gymnastics at the IV Commonwealth Youth Games
- Host city: Isle of Man
- Dates: 9–11 September 2011

Artistic Gymnastics was one of the seven sports of the 2011 Commonwealth Youth Games. Between 9 and 11 September 2011, the girls' events were held in Manx Gymnastics Centre of Excellence and the boys' events were held at the Ellan Vannin Gymnastics Club, both in Douglas, Isle of Man. Artistic gymnastics was previously held at the Commonwealth Youth Games in 2004 and 2000, but it has not been held since.

Each Commonwealth Games Association could send a team of up to three athletes in girls and boys each. The age limit for the girls' events was 13–15 (born 1996–1998) and for boys, it was 14–18 (born 1993–1997). In the girls competition, twenty-eight gymnasts from thirteen countries competed, and in the boys event, twenty-six gymnasts from twelve countries competed.

England won both the boys and girls team titles. Dominick Cunningham from England was the most successful gymnast of the event with three gold medals, one silver medal, and one bronze medal. Overall, England was the most successful country of the event- winning eight out of the fourteen gold medal awarded as well as five silver medals and five bronze medals.

== Medal summary ==
Event	Gold	Silver	Bronze
Boys
Team	England; Brinn Bevan; Dominick Cunningham; Gaius Thompson	Canada; Zachary Clay; Curtis Graves; Kal Nemier	Australia; Tyson Bull; Kent Pieterse; Declan Stacey
Individual all-around	(England) Dominick Cunningham	(England) Gaius Thompson	(Wales) Harry Owen
Floor	(Australia) Declan Stacey	(England) Brinn Bevan	(Cyprus) Michails Krasias
Pommel horse	(Cyprus) Michails Krasias	(England) Gaius Thompson	(England) Dominick Cunningham
Rings	(Cyprus) Michails Krasias	(Australia) Tyson Bull	(Canada) Curtis Graves
Vault	(Scotland) Douglas Ross	(England) Dominick Cunningham	(Singapore) Wei-An Terry Tay
Parallel bars	(England) Gaius Thompson	(England) Brinn Bevan	(Canada) Curtis Graves
Horizontal bar	(England) Dominick Cunningham	(Canada) Curtis Graves	(Canada) Kal Nemier
Girls
Team	England; Abi Caig; Charlie Fellows; Rebecca Tunney	Wales; Kiera Brennan; Angel Romaeo; Raer Theaker	Australia; Alexandra Eade; Madelaine Leydin; Emma Nedov
Individual all-around	(Wales) Angel Romaeo	(New Zealand) Brittany Robertson	(England) Abi Caig
Vault	(England) Rebecca Tunney	(South Africa) Kirsten Beckett	(England) Abi Caig
Uneven bars	(England) Charlie Fellows	(Wales) Raer Theaker	(Wales) Angel Romaeo
Balance beam	(Australia) Emma Nedov	(Wales) Raer Theaker	(England) Charlie Fellows
Floor	(England) Abi Caig	(New Zealand) Brittany Robertson	(England) Rebecca Tunney
