= Carver Bank =

Carver Bank may refer to several black-owned or -operated banks named after George Washington Carver:

- Carver Federal Savings Bank, founded in 1848
- Carver State Bank, established in 1927, based and operating in Georgia
- Carver Savings and Loan Association, Omaha, Nebraska, founded in 1944, now defunct
