= Kevin Cohee =

American business executive

- Born: October 20, 1957 (age 68); Kansas City, Missouri, U.S.
- Education: Harvard Law School (JD); University of Wisconsin (MBA)
- Occupation: Bank executive
- Years active: 1985–present
- Known for: Co-founder, chairman, and CEO, OneUnited Bank
- Spouse: Teri Williams Cohee
- Children: 2

Kevin Cohee (/ˈkoʊhiːˈ/ born October 20, 1957) is an American multi-millionaire business executive. Since 1996, he has been the co-founder, chairman, and chief executive officer of One United Bank, the largest black-owned bank and the first black-owned internet bank in America.

== Early life and education ==
Cohee was born in Kansas City, Missouri, to African-American parents. He never met his father, and his mother died due to an allergic reaction to penicillin when he was six years old. Cohee was raised by his uncle, Richard Carr, a pediatric dentist in Boston.

Cohee graduated from Harvard Law School with a Juris Doctor degree. He also holds a Master of Business Administration and a Bachelor of Arts degree from the University of Wisconsin; where he was a 4-year letterman in football.

== Career ==
Following university, Cohee became an investment banker at Salomon Smith Barney.

In 1989, Cohee and his colleague and wife, Teri Williams, acquired Military Professional Services, Inc. (MPS), a 29-year-old company that marketed Visa and MasterCard credit cards to military personnel. Cohee and Williams built MPS into a profitable company, establishing a US$40 million portfolio with over 20,000 customers. They sold Military Professional Services to First Chicago Corp in 1991.

In 1995, Cohee acquired majority controlling interest in Boston Bank of Commerce. In the next couple of years they would purchase three more banks and consolidated them into OneUnited, an institution focused on empowering Black Americans. He was elected chairman and CEO the following year; and Williams serves as president and COO. The bank has offices in Miami and Los Angeles. On October 7, 2019, Cohee and Williams announced BankBlack X: A nationwide plan to close the racial wealth gap. Its goal is to "Galvanize the community to share the truth about Black people and money, and make financial literacy a core value of the Black community." As of 2025, OneUnited had helped finance almost $1 billion in communities with low-to-medium income.
