= Kameko Tarnez =

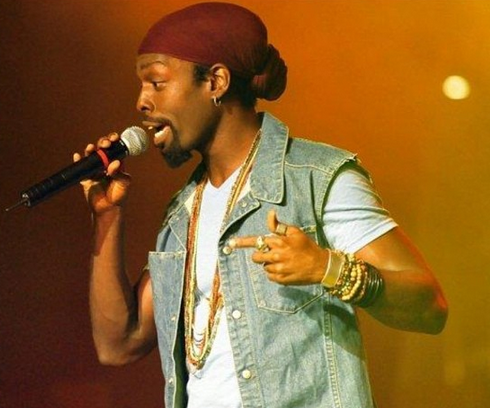

Background information
- Born: October 2, 1984 (age 42); Baltimore, Maryland
- Genres: world music, Soul
- Occupations: Singer, Songwriter, Actor, Film Producer, Director, Screen Writer
- Instrument: Vocals
- Years active: 1994 -present
- Labels: Archrok Entertainment, SRG/Universal Records, Interscope, and Black Kat /Sony Music

Kameko Tarnez is an American world music and soul singer, writer, director, and feature film producer. He has collaborated with artists such as Michael Jackson, Erykah Badu, Toni Braxton, Grace Jones, Rita Marley, Vanessa Williams, and others. Tarnez is the owner of Archrok Entertainment. His company has partnered with Rhonda Ross (daughter of icon Diana Ross and entertainment mogul Berry Gordy) and actor Hill Harper to produce the Egyptian feature film trilogy Protector of the Gods, which he wrote and directed.

"WBAI Interview"
radio reference from Kameko's "Peace Revolution "charity tour

== Education ==
Kameko Tarnez was born in Baltimore, Maryland on October 2, 1984. He is single, has never married, and has no children. After high school, he moved to New York City with a scholarship to attend AMDA (The American Music And Dramatic Academy)

== Career ==
Tarnez started singing professionally at the age of 12, touring nightclubs, schools, and amusement parks. In 1994 he was the opening act for Disney star Raven-Symoné. In 1997, he starred as the "Scarecrow", alongside music icon Grace Jones, Grammy winner Peabo Bryson, and dance artist CeCe Peniston in the touring revival of the hit Broadway show The Wiz. Next he toured Italy with Bob Singleton and his group "Golden Gospel Singers" for the "Gospel America Tour" as a featured singer and dancer. He later recorded a cast album with the group, which sold over 500,000 copies.

In 2000, Tarnez moved to London and signed a recording deal with "SugerReff/BlakKat" on the Sony Music label. In 2002, he and the label parted ways. With the support and guidance of Universal Music Group president Monte Lipman, Tarnez released his first studio album in 2003 entitled "Evalt" (Evolutionary Alternative) on his own label Tarpaul Records. His music video was featured on MTV2's show "Advance Warning". The album received positive reviews which led to Tarnez's 2006 collaboration with Michael Jackson.

Also in 2006, Tarnez's "Crazy 4 Your Love" reached No. 1 on the UK Dance Charts (for DJ play list), and the song was featured on the hit TV show "Hero". Then he was a featured guest performer for the Imagination's Revolution Awards Show at the Apollo Theater, honoring rap group Dead Prez, music mogul Damon Dash, and Oscar winner Lee Daniels.

In 2007 Tarnez was invited to perform alongside Grammy Award winner Erykah Badu and others for a Stevie Wonder music tribute concert in Dallas at the Black Forest Theater. In 2007, Tarnez's original song "Tired of Being Broke" was used in a Showtime documentary American Drug War: The Last White Hope.

In 2009 Tarnez moved to Paris for a music collaboration with Paulo Goude, son of music icon Grace Jones. They released a dance single "Never Gonna Get It" in 2010. Tarnez and the Marley family were photographed for Essence magazine at the Marley mansion in 2011.

== Formation of Archrok Entertainment ==
Tarnez and a group of international investorsformed Archrok Entertainment. The company offers creative consulting and marketing, artist management, and film production. It has an independent record label which has had select release, and distribution deals with Interscope Records, Universal Music Group, Sony Music, and other labels. Archrok also has a number of significant film projects in the works. The company is building film and recording studios in 5 African countries starting in Ghana with the first 100,000 sq foot facility. In addition to Protector of the Gods, other Archrok films include the 2013 release Samuel Bleak and upcoming releases Oronpoto, AYAN and Africa’s Iron King.

== Fundraising and charity ==
In 2008, in an attempt to support Barack Obama's campaign, Tarnez launched a national tour and was then invited by the president's team to perform for select inaugural events.

"Evalt Music Festival"
radio reference from Kameko's "Evalt music Festival" charity tour

Tarnez partnered with Starbucks, Carver Federal Savings Bank, Oscar-winning actor Matt Damon, and Rita Marley (the widow of Bob Marley) in 2011 for his "Tired of Being Broke Fundraising Tour" which was launched to raise money and provide clean water supply in developing countries. The tour's opening night was sold out with a crowd of 15,000 people, raising over $250,000 for the charity.
