= 2014 Voronin Cup =

Mikhail Voronin Cup
- Location: Moscow, Russia
- Date: December 16–17, 2014

The 2014 Voronin Cup took place on December 16–17 in Moscow, Russia.

== Medal winners ==
Event	Gold	Silver	Bronze
Team	Russia; Ekaterina Kramarenko; Anastasia Ilyankova	Russia (Dynamo); Natalia Kapitonova; Polina Spirina	Finland; Monica Sileoni; Tira Kuitunen
Senior
All-Around	Ekaterina Kramarenko (RUS)	Kristina Kruglikova (RUS)	Anna Pavlova (AZE)
Vault	Maria Paseka (RUS)	Ksenia Afanasyeva (RUS)	Anna Pavlova (AZE)
Uneven Bars	Ekaterina Kramarenko (RUS)	Maria Paseka (RUS)	Anna Pavlova (AZE)
Balance Beam	Ekaterina Kramarenko (RUS)	Anna Pavlova (AZE)	Yulia Inshina (AZE)
Floor Exercise	Ksenia Afanasyeva (RUS)	Ekaterina Kramarenko (RUS)	Anna Pavlova (AZE)
Junior
All-Around	Anastasia Ilyankova (RUS)	Daria Skrypnik (RUS)	Monica Sileoni (FIN)
Vault	Ekaterina Sokova (RUS)	Isa Maassen (NED)	Anastasia Ilyankova (RUS)
Uneven Bars	Natalia Kapitonova (RUS)	Daria Skrypnik (RUS)	Natalia Yakubova (BLR)
Balance Beam	Ekaterina Sokova (RUS)	Anastasia Ilyankova (RUS)	Magda Robakidze (GEO)
Floor Exercise	Ekaterina Sokova (RUS)	Isa Maassen (NED)	Monica Sileoni (FIN)

== Senior Result ==
=== All-Around ===
Position	Gymnast	Vault (gymnastics)	Uneven bars	Balance beam	Floor (gymnastics)	Total
1st place, gold medalist(s)	Ekaterina Kramarenko (RUS)	14.050	14.550	13.250	13.800	55.650
2nd place, silver medalist(s)	Kristina Kruglikova (RUS)	14.200	11.900	13.250	13.500	52.850
	Irina Sazonova (RUS)	13.600	13.300	13.200	12.000	52.100
3rd place, bronze medalist(s)	Anna Pavlova (AZE)	13.550	12.900	12.800	12.450	51.700
	Ekaterina Shtronda (RUS)	13.300	11.350	13.500	12.800	50.950
4	Dominiqua Belanyi (ISL)	12.750	12.533	12.600	12.600	50.483
5	Yulia Inshina (AZE)	13.700	10.950	12.150	12.150	48.950
6	Zhanerke Duisek (KAZ)	12.050	10.150	14.100	12.550	48.850
	Valentina Shohina (RUS)	13.650	10.100	11.800	12.800	48.350
	Ksenia Artemova (RUS)	12.950	12.750	11.750	11.050	47.500
	Maria Paseka (RUS)	14.900	14.350		13.100	42.350
	Ksenia Afanasyeva (RUS)	15.050			15.000	30.050

=== Vault ===
Rank	Gymnast	Score
1st place, gold medalist(s)	Maria Paseka (RUS)	14.550
2nd place, silver medalist(s)	Ksenia Afanasyeva (RUS)	14.500
3rd place, bronze medalist(s)	Anna Pavlova (AZE)	13.250
4	Nato Dzidziguri (GEO)	12.400

=== Uneven Bars ===
Rank	Gymnast	Score
1st place, gold medalist(s)	Ekaterina Kramarenko (RUS)	14.750
2nd place, silver medalist(s)	Maria Paseka (RUS)	14.050
3rd place, bronze medalist(s)	Anna Pavlova (AZE)	12.750
4	Dominigua Belanyi (ISL)	12.400
5	Aleksandra Rascic (SRB)	11.500
6	Yulia Inshina (AZE)	10.700
7	Janerke Duysek (KAZ)	10.500
8	Anastasija Zulina (LAT)	5.050

=== Balance Beam ===
Rank	Gymnast	Score
1st place, gold medalist(s)	Ekaterina Kramarenko (RUS)	14.400
2nd place, silver medalist(s)	Anna Pavlova (AZE)	13.550
3rd place, bronze medalist(s)	Yulia Inshina (AZE)	13.000
4	Ekaterina Shtronda (RUS)	12.450
5	Dominigua Belanyi (ISL)	12.300
6	Janerke Duysek (KAZ)	12.200
7	Ominakhon Khalilova (UZB)	12.150
8	Nato Dzidziguri (GEO)	10.800

=== Floor Exercise ===
Rank	Gymnast	Score
1st place, gold medalist(s)	Ksenia Afanasyeva (RUS)	14.800
2nd place, silver medalist(s)	Ekaterina Kramarenko (RUS)	12.950
3rd place, bronze medalist(s)	Anna Pavlova (AZE)	12.800
4	Ominakhon Khalilova (UZB)	12.600
5	Nato Dzidziguri (GEO)	12.550
6	Dominigua Belanyi (ISL)	12.500
7	Janerke Duysek (KAZ)	12.500
8	Aleksandra Rascic (SRB)	10.850

== Junior Result ==
=== All-Around ===
Position	Gymnast	Vault (gymnastics)	Uneven bars	Balance beam	Floor (gymnastics)	Total
1st place, gold medalist(s)	Anastasia Ilyankova (RUS)	13.700	13.800	14.350	13.400	55.250
2nd place, silver medalist(s)	Daria Skrypnik (RUS)	13.850	13.900	13.450	13.650	54.850
	Ekaterina Sokova (RUS)	13.600	12.250	13.600	14.350	53.800
	Natalia Kapitonova (RUS)	13.250	14.400	11.750	14.050	53.450
3rd place, bronze medalist(s)	Monica Sileoni (FIN)	13.550	12.400	12.950	13.600	52.500
4	Natallia Yakubava (BLR)	12.800	12.750	13.450	13.250	52.250
	Viktoria Gazeeva (RUS)	13.300	13.050	10.250	13.600	50.200
	Polina Spirina (RUS)	13.500	11.700	12.000	12.950	50.150
	Anastasia Kuznetsova (RUS)	12.650	10.450	12.600	12.750	48.450
	Elena Guseva (RUS)	13.700	10.600	11.500	12.250	48.050
	Margarita Vamakova (RUS)	12.650	10.850	12.200	11.100	46.800
	Anastasia Kuzmicheva (RUS)	13.000	9.700	10.100	11.700	44.500

=== Vault ===
Rank	Gymnast	Score
1st place, gold medalist(s)	Ekaterina Sokova (RUS)	13.875
2nd place, silver medalist(s)	Isa Maassen (NED)	13.775
3rd place, bronze medalist(s)	Anastasia Ilyankova (RUS)	13.750

=== Uneven Bars ===
Rank	Gymnast	Score
1st place, gold medalist(s)	Natalia Kapitonova (RUS)	14.450
2nd place, silver medalist(s)	Daria Skrypnik (RUS)	13.850
3rd place, bronze medalist(s)	Natallia Yakubava (BLR)	12.650

=== Balance Beam ===
Rank	Gymnast	Score
1st place, gold medalist(s)	Ekaterina Sokova (RUS)	13.450
2nd place, silver medalist(s)	Anastasia Ilyankova (RUS)	13.100
3rd place, bronze medalist(s)	Magda Robakidze (GEO)	12.700

=== Floor Exercise ===
Rank	Gymnast	Score
1st place, gold medalist(s)	Ekaterina Sokova (RUS)	13.900
2nd place, silver medalist(s)	Isa Maassen (NED)	13.300
3rd place, bronze medalist(s)	Monica Sileoni (FIN)	13.150
4	Natalia Kapitonova (RUS)	13.000
