= Teri Williams =

21st-century American bank executive

- Born: 1964 (age 61–62); Indiantown, Florida, U.S.
- Education: Brown University; Harvard University
- Occupation: Bank executive
- Known for: Co-founder, president and COO, OneUnited Bank
- Spouse: Kevin Cohee
- Children: 2

Teri Williams (born 1964) is an American bank executive. She is the co-founder, president, and chief operating officer of OneUnited Bank, the largest black-owned bank in the United States, that strives to close the racial wealth gap. OneUnited Bank is based in Boston, MA, with branches in Los Angeles and Miami.

== Early life and education ==
Teri Williams was born in Indiantown, Florida in 1964. She graduated from Brown University with a Bachelor of Arts with distinctions in economics, and then graduated from Harvard with a Master of Business Administration with honors.

== Career ==
Williams began her career in finance in 1983 at American Express, where she was the youngest-ever vice president.

In 1989, Williams and her colleague and husband, Kevin Cohee, acquired Military Professional Services, Inc. (MPS), a 29-year-old company that marketed Visa and MasterCard credit cards to military personnel. Williams and Cohee built MPS into a profitable company, establishing a US$40 million portfolio with over 20,000 customers. They sold MPS to First Chicago Corp in 1991.

In 1995, Williams and Cohee acquired majority controlling interest in Boston Bank of Commerce. In the next couple of years they would purchase three more banks and consolidated them into OneUnited, an institution focused on empowering Black Americans. Cohee was appointed as chairman and CEO; Williams as president and COO. On October 7, 2019, Cohee and Williams announced BankBlack X: A nationwide plan to close the racial wealth gap. Its goal is to "Galvanize the community to share the truth about Black people and money, and make financial literacy a core value of the Black community." In a 2025 interview broadcast on CNBC's The Shift, Williams noted that a Federal Reserve study concluded that almost 50% of Black Americans are highly vulnerable to predatory lenders. As of 2025, OneUnited had helped finance almost $1 billion in communities with low-to-medium income.

In 2019, Williams published I Got Bank!: What My Granddad Taught Me About Money, a children's book, to teach financial literacy to children of color and highlight the importance of saving and developing good financial habits. She is also the founder of the Black Economic Council of Massachusetts and serves on the board of CCC Intelligent Solutions and the Boston Foundation Racial Wealth Gap Partnership.

== Honors and awards ==
In 2013, Williams was presented with the Sapphire Award at the North Eastern University's John D. O’Bryant African American Institute, in recognition of Williams' commitment to the African American community, specifically to ensure access to quality and affordable financial guidance. In 2022, she was featured in Forbes 50 over 50 list for women in financial services. The following year, she was recognized as one of "Boston’s most admired, beloved, and successful Black Women leaders" by the Black Women Lead project. In 2025, Williams was recognized in Black Enterprise's "10 Black Women Who Broke Barriers in Business" for her work fighting for Black American's right to control their own financial future.

== Published works ==
- Williams, Teri (2019). I Got Bank!: What My Granddad Taught Me About Money (illustrated ed.). Beckham Publications Group, Incorporated. ISBN 978-0-98279-437-1.
