= M. Moran Weston =

African-American priest, banker, and activist (1910–2002)

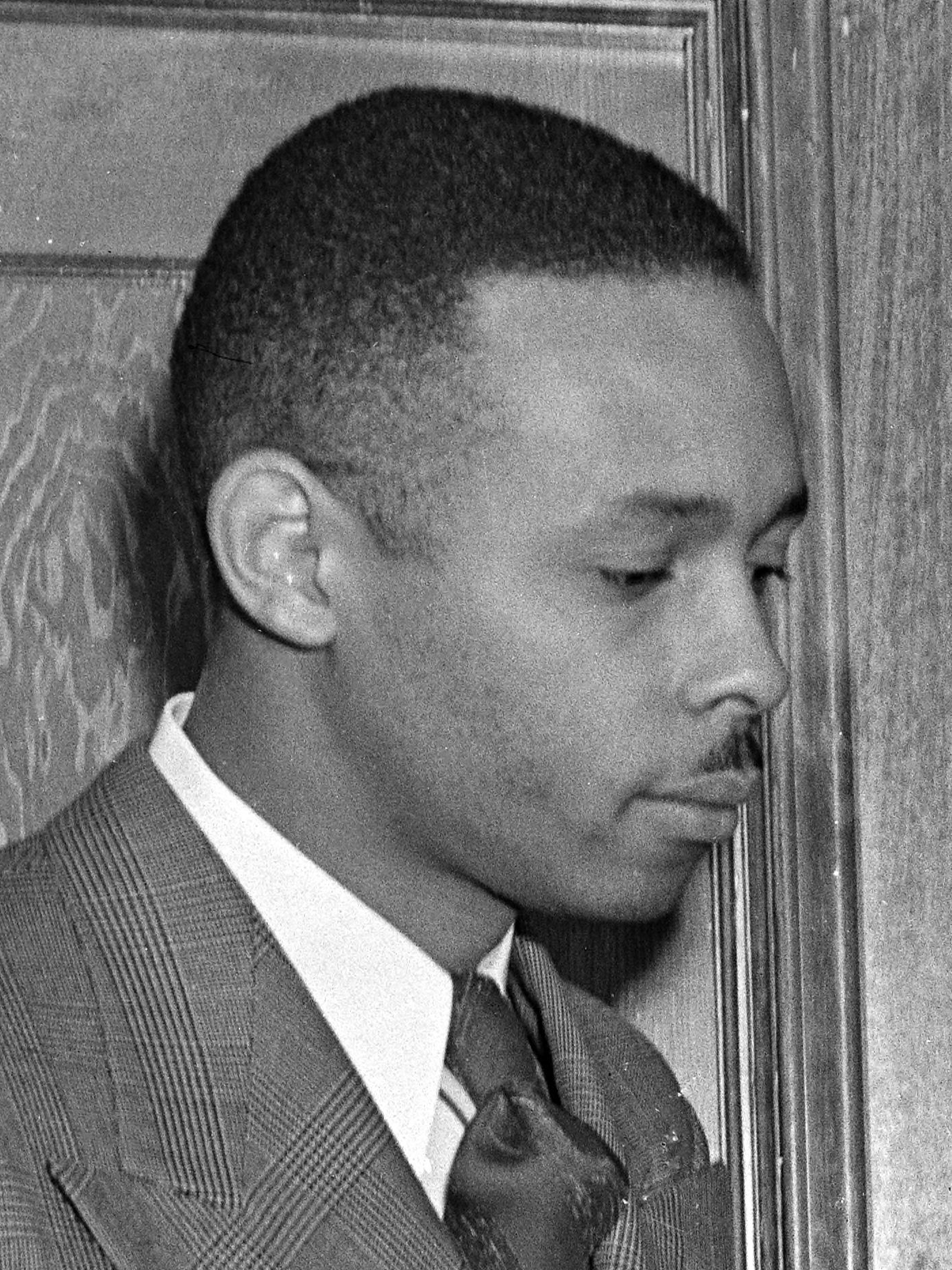
- Weston in 1941
- Born: Milton Moran Weston II; September 10, 1910; Tarboro, North Carolina, U.S.
- Died: May 18, 2002 (aged 91); Seminole County, Florida, U.S.
- Education: Columbia University (BA, PhD); Union Theological Seminary (BD, MDiv)
- Occupations: Priest; activist

Milton Moran Weston II (better known as M. Moran Weston, September 10, 1910 – May 18, 2002) was an African-American Episcopal priest who "led one of Harlem's most prominent churches, helped found what became the nation's largest black-owned financial institution and built housing for thousands." In 1969 Weston explained his eclectic career saying "A banker-priest is really no more strange than an educator-priest or a social worker priest." Although he told the New York Times in 1986 "I do nothing ... I cause things to happen. If I have a gift, it is to encourage people that they can do the impossible" he also was willing to make things not happen: He opposed a school boycott "by arguing that it did no good to keep children out of school."

Fifteen years after accepting his position as rector of St. Philip's Episcopal Church in Manhattan, "the largest Protestant Episcopal church in the country" he was described as "one of the nation's busiest men, involved in a score of educational, financial, housing, health, youth and senior-citizen projects."

When Knickerbocker Hospital closed, it was repurposed as senior housing with his name.

== Early life ==
Weston was born in Tarboro, North Carolina, "the son and grandson of Episcopal ministers". He came to New York in 1928 as a teenager to continue his college education, which he had started at St. Augustine's Junior College in Raleigh, N.C. Weston "earned a bachelor's degree and a doctorate in history from Columbia University" at a time when he was one of five black undergraduates.

Weston then trained as a clergyman and received his bachelor and master of divinity degrees from Union Theological Seminary in 1934. His formal ordination, following in the path of his father and grandfather, was in 1950.

== Carver Bank ==
Having already gained experience through the 1945 founding of a church credit union, Weston, along with a supporting team of 14, applied for a state charter to open a bank. Having been refused, they applied for a federal charter; the basis of Carver Bank. It opened "in a simple storefront," and grew.

== Civil rights and labor activism ==
Prior to his formal 1950 ordination, Weston was active in labor and social causes and joined the National Negro Congress as field secretary. He organized civil rights rallies in New York City and worked to provide jobs and housing for the local community.

He also worked, prior to attaining ordination as a deacon, first as a caseworker, then as a supervisor, for New York City's Department of Social Welfare.

== Housing ==
He continued for more than a decade "in his so-called retirement" to add to "some of the 10 or so buildings that stand because of his efforts over the last 20 years." Decades earlier he had "directed construction of five nonprofit housing developments in Harlem." The first built was 14 stories; the second was 16 stories, with significant focus on senior housing.

His construction focus wasn't just housing: "another of his legacies" is the Upper Manhattan Child Development/Day Care Center.

== Civic leadership ==
In 1965 Weston advocated that his followers support "a civilian police review board and oppose individual residential water meters."

In 1969, he was elected as the first African American trustee of Columbia University; his election was followed by the appointment of another African American member, Franklin A. Thomas.

His scholarly pursuits include writing as a columnist for the New York Amsterdam News and serving as a tenured professor at the State University of New York at Albany from 1968 to 1977.

== Family ==
He married "the former Miriam Yvonne Drake" in 1946. Offspring include their daughter Katherine ("a nun of the Serbian Orthodox Church"), son Gregory, and two grandchildren. Weston died at age 91 in his Heathrow Seminole County, Florida home; "he is also survived by his sister, Catherine."
