= 2014 Northern European Gymnastics Championships =

International gymnastics competition

- Venue: Greve Idrætscenter
- Location: Greve, Denmark
- Start date: 12 September 2014
- End date: 14 September 2014

The 2014 Northern European Gymnastics Championships was an artistic gymnastics competition held in Greve, Denmark. The event was held between the 12th and 14 September at the Greve Idrætscenter.

== Medalists ==
Event	Gold	Silver	Bronze
Men
Team all-around	Denmark; Helge Vammen; Marcus Frandsen; Joao Fuglsig; Joachim Winther; Stig Kjeldsen	Sweden; Pontus Kallanvaara; Michael Trane; Carl Green; Christopher Soos	Ireland; Kieran Behan; Andrew Smith; Rohan Sebastian; Christopher O'Connor; Daniel Fox
Individual all-around	Helge Vammen (DEN)	Pontus Kallanvaara (SWE)	Marcus Frandsen (DEN)
Floor	Andrew Smith (IRL)	Rohan Sebastian (IRL)	Tom Barnes (SCO)
Pommel horse	Helge Vammen (DEN)	Anthony Duchars (IOM)	Marcus Frandsen (DEN)
Rings	Rohan Sebastian (IRL)	Kieran Behan (IRL)	Pontus Kallanvaara (SWE)
Vault	Stig Kjeldsen (DEN)	Carl Green (SWE)	Joao Fuglsig (DEN)
Parallel bars	Helge Vammen (DEN)	Jack Neill (NIR) Joao Fuglsig (DEN)	None awarded
Horizontal bar	Kieran Behan (IRL)	Rohan Sebastian (IRL)	Joachim Winther (DEN)
Women
Team all-around	Wales; Maisie Methuen; Rebecca Moore; Angel Romaeo; Emily Thomas; Latalia Bevan	Denmark; Mette Hulgaard; Marie Skammelsen; Victoria Gilberg; Sarah El-Dabagh; Michelle Lauritsen	Finland; Annika Urvikko; Erika Pakkala; Veronika Vuosjoki; Anna Salmi; Monica Sileoni
Individual all-around	Maisie Methuen (WAL)	Annika Urvikko (FIN)	Rebecca Moore (WAL)
Vault	Annika Urvikko (FIN)	Marie Skammelsen (DEN)	Casey Jo Bell (NIR)
Uneven bars	Irina Sazonova (ISL)	Jolie Ruckley (WAL)	Casey Jo Bell (NIR)
Balance beam	Latalia Bevan (WAL)	Martine Skregelid (NOR)	Casey Jo Bell (NIR)
Floor	Angel Romaeo (WAL)	Maisie Methuen (WAL)	Martine Skregelid (NOR)

== Medal table ==
Rank	Nation	Gold	Silver	Bronze	Total
1	Denmark (DEN)	5	3	4	12
2	Wales (WAL)	4	2	1	7
3	Ireland (IRL)	3	3	1	7
4	Finland (FIN)	1	1	1	3
5	Iceland (ISL)	1	0	0	1
6	Sweden (SWE)	0	3	1	4
7	Northern Ireland (NIR)	0	1	3	4
8	Norway (NOR)	0	1	1	2
9	Isle of Man (IOM)	0	1	0	1
10	Scotland (SCO)	0	0	1	1
Totals (10 entries)		14	15	13	42
