= Carver State Bank =

Black-operated bank in Georgia, US

- Formerly: Georgia Savings and Realty Corp (1927–1947); Carver Savings Bank (1947–1962); Carver State Bank (1962)
- Industry: Financial services
- Founded: 23 February 1927; 99 years ago (Georgia Savings and Realty Corp)
- Founder: Louis B. Toomer
- Headquarters: Savannah, Georgia
- Products: Banking

Carver State Bank is a Black-operated 1927-founded bank that operates in Georgia.

== History ==
The multi-branch banks's headquarters are in Savannah. It was founded February 23, 1927, by Savannah-born Louis B. Toomer as Georgia Savings and Realty Corp.

On April 29, 1947 it became a state-supervised bank (with FDIC-insured effective June 1, 1947)), and their name was changed to Carver Savings Bank. In 1962, when "Carver became a full-service commercial bank offering checking accounts" it assumed its present name: Carver State Bank. Like Carver Federal Savings Bank, to which it is not connected, it is named after George Washington Carver. Carver, like New York-based Carver Federal Savings Bank, "is among the roughly 1,000 government-recognized Community Development Financial Institutions dedicated to economically underserved areas." As a CDFI, Carver is eligible for New Market Tax Credits.
