= Rohan Sebastian =

Irish artistic gymnast

- Born: March 14, 1991 (age 35) Belfast, Northern Ireland
- Height: 1.78 m (5 ft 10 in)

Gymnastics career
- Country represented: (Republic of Ireland) Ireland
- College team: University of Michigan
- Head coaches: Kurt Golder, Ivan Ivankov
Medal record
Representing Ireland
Northern European Gymnastics Championships
Gold medal – first place	2015 Limerick	Team All-around
Gold medal – first place	2014 Greve	Rings
Silver medal – second place	2014 Greve	Floor
Silver medal – second place	2014 Greve	High Bar
Bronze medal – third place	2014 Greve	Team

Rohan Mathew Sebastian (born March 14, 1991) is an artistic gymnast who has represented Ireland at numerous World Championships and European Championships. He is the first Irish gymnast to qualify to the World University Games and also competed at the first ever European Games governed by the European Olympic Committees (EOC). He was also a member of the two-time National Champion Michigan Wolverines men's gymnastics team.

== Early life ==
Sebastian was born in Belfast, Northern Ireland to parents Anthony and Veronique, both physicians educated in India. He grew up in Oklahoma City, Oklahoma where he attended Bart Conner Gymnastics Academy training under World Champion and Olympic gymnast Ivan Ivankov. Holding dual U.S. and Irish citizenship, he first represented Ireland at the 2008 European Championships in Lausanne, Switzerland. Sebastian signed with the University of Michigan in 2009. As a freshman in 2010, he earned Michigan's first ever Big Ten Freshman of the Week award and helped lead Michigan to an NCAA Division I team championship as the lead off gymnast in the final rotation. He was elected co-captain of the Michigan men's gymnastics team as a senior and led the team to another NCAA Team Championship and Big Ten Conference team championship, alongside US Olympian Samuel Mikulak.
