= OneUnited Bank =

African-American-owned bank based in Boston, Massachusetts

Coordinates: 42°21′26″N 71°03′26″W

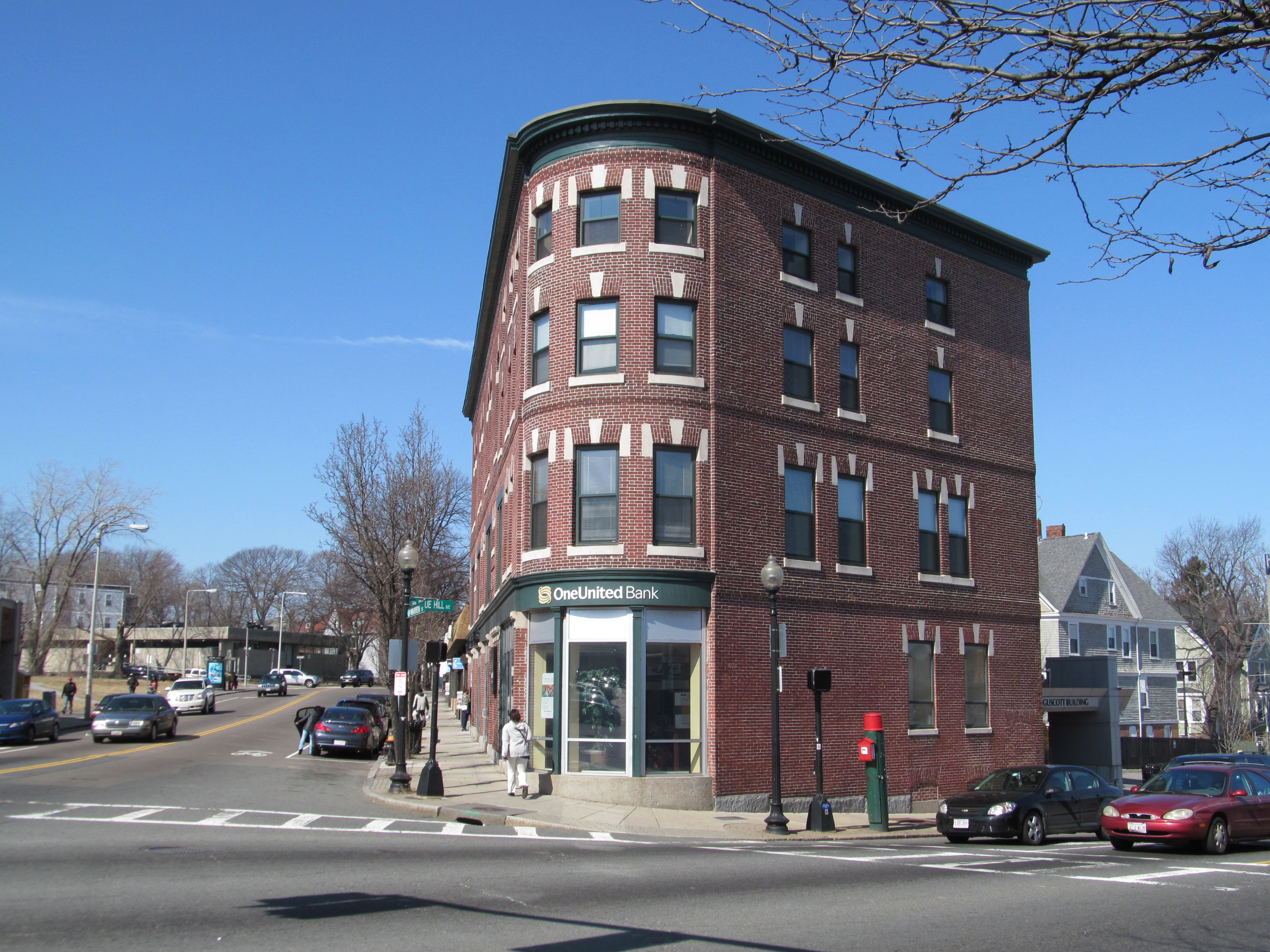
- OneUnited branch in Dorchester, MA
- Type: Chartered trust company; Community Development Financial Institution
- Industry: Community development banking; African-American bank
- Predecessors: Unity Bank & Trust Company; Boston Bank of Commerce; Peoples National Bank of Commerce; Founders National Bank of Los Angeles; Family Savings Bank
- Founded: 1968; 58 years ago (as Unity) in Boston, Massachusetts; 1995 (as OneUnited)
- Headquarters: 185 Devonshire Street, Boston, Massachusetts, United States
- Number of locations: 6 branches
- Areas served: Boston, MA; Miami, FL; Los Angeles, CA
- Key people: Kevin Cohee (Chairman & CEO); Teri Williams (President & COO)
- Products: Financial services; Mortgages; Credit cards
- Number of employees: 92 (2021)
- Website: oneunited.com

OneUnited Bank is an African-American-owned and managed Massachusetts-chartered trust company headquartered in Boston, Massachusetts. It is also registered by the Federal Deposit Insurance Corporation (FDIC), and certified as a community development financial institution (CDFI) by the United States Department of Treasury. As of April 30, 2018, OneUnited Bank maintained US$661.2 million in total assets.

== History ==
=== Beginnings ===
The bank was founded in 1968 as Unity Bank & Trust Company with $1.2 million in capital in the then-Dudley Square (now Nubian Square) neighborhood of Boston, aiming to revitalize the area by lending exclusively to local businesses and homeowners. Unity Bank failed after nine years of operations, and a newly organized bank, Bank of Boston Commerce, was formed.

Boston Bank of Commerce expanded the model of community development to include partnerships with large corporations and government agencies. Its chairmen included United States Senator Edward Brooke. With total assets of $257.183 million and total deposits of $125.216 million as of 31 December 2000, Boston Bank of Commerce filed for application to merge with Founders National Bank of Los Angeles, California, its four offices in operation and total resources of $107.009 million and total deposits of $98.659 million as of December 31, 2000. "Favorable" statutory factors, other relevant information and Comptroller of Currency reports led to the approval of the merger transaction application from Boston Bank of Commerce, by the Board of Governors of the Federal Reserve System, the Director of the Office of Thrift Supervision, and the Attorney General of the United States.

=== 1990s ===
In the mid-1990s, following the economic downturn that adversely affected other northeast-based regional banks, Boston Bank of Commerce was placed under a cease-and-desist order by the FDIC and charged to increase capital and improve the quality of its loan portfolio. In 1995 a significant capital infusion was made by Kevin Cohee and his wife, Teri Williams. Cohee was appointed as chairman and chief executive, and Williams as president and chief operating officer, roles that, as of 2026, they both continue to hold. They adopted a new strategy of acquiring African American-owned banks and thrift institutions in Miami, FL and Los Angeles, CA. At the time of acquiring the Boston Bank of Commerce, the institution temporarily had negative equity and significant asset problems. Over several years, led by Cohee and Williams, the bank subsequently acquired three African-American owned banks, all of which were troubled or on the verge of failure. Boston Bank of Commerce became the first interstate African American-owned bank in the country through its acquisition of Peoples National Bank of Commerce, South Florida’s only African-American-owned bank.

=== 2000s ===
In 2001 the institution merged with Founders National Bank of Los Angeles, of which the majority owners were former professional basketball player and businessman Earvin "Magic" Johnson, musician Janet Jackson, and former Motown Records President Jheryl Busby. Cohee and Williams rebranded Boston Bank of Commerce as OneUnited Bank.

OneUnited Bank offers an annual financial literacy essay contest for youth, and President Teri Williams wrote a children's book, I Got Bank! What My Granddad Taught Me About Money, to teach financial literacy to urban youth.

In the latter part of 2008 and the beginning of 2009, OneUnited experienced financial problems as their equity investment in Freddie Mac and Fannie Mae became worthless. In order to stabilize the institution, the bank applied for and received $12 million from the Troubled Asset Relief Program (TARP). Since 2009, the bank has demonstrated sustained profitability. As of October 2019, OneUnited was one of only six banks to have neither failed financially nor paid back the investments, having not made a dividend payment since 2009. As of 2019, it owed $8.7 million in dividends as well as the $12 million principal.

=== 2010s ===
OneUnited Bank's branch staff use Salesforce CRM software on iPads in its Boston, Los Angeles and Miami branches.

In 2013, regulators from the Massachusetts Division of Banks and the FDIC said there has been “minimal lending activity” in Boston. They also cited a lack of lending in the Miami market that amounted to "substantial noncompliance". OneUnited had made or purchased 34 loans in Massachusetts in three years, according to the report. Of those, 26 took place in Suffolk County, where the bank operates three offices. The bank expanded lending and refinancing, mostly for multi-family properties in Los Angeles, issuing 78 loans. But it made just eight loans in Boston and three in Miami. Nationally, only nine of the bank's loans last year were made to low- or moderate-income borrowers.

In January 2014, OneUnited introduced the UNITY Visa secured credit card called the "Comeback Card", for customers with low credit scores. The card includes training for customers to improve their credit score. OneUnited Bank received recognition as a Notable IT Initiative from Community Banks by American Banker for the UNITY Visa Card's "Me" app, which allows consumers to apply for the card and, if they are approved, it allows them to open a deposit account to fund it. Beginning November 1, 2014, OneUnited removed online and over-the-phone credit card balance pay services. Bank branches that currently provide these services over-the-counter are now only located in the metropolitan areas of Boston, Miami, and Los Angeles. Sending a check by mail is the current de facto payment method for Unity Credit Card holders who live at long distances from bank branches.

=== 2020s ===
OneUnited came to media attention in 2020 after offering a Visa card featuring an image of abolitionist, slave rescuer and political activist Harriet Tubman apparently performing a "Wakanda Forever" salute (from the film Black Panther). The image was created by Miami artist Addonis Parker; he claimed that the gesture was intended to be the American Sign Language sign for "love."

In 2024, the bank announced that it would relocate its downtown Boston head office to a new building at 54 John Eliot Square, Roxbury, in the heart of a Boston African-American community, not far from Nubian Square. It was anticipated that the move would be completed during 2025; however, during December 2024, the bank withdrew its application; and in January 2026, an application to relocate its head office to 185 Devonshire Street, in Boston's financial district was approved.

== Awards ==
OneUnited Bank won the Treasury Department's highest award – The Bank Enterprise Award in 2004, 2005, 2006, 2007 and 2008.

== Locations ==
As of March 2026, OneUnited had offices in the following locations:

Name	Type	Address	Notes
Boston	Corporate headquarters	185 Devonshire Street, Boston, MA 02110	Non-cash office
Compton	Branch	1495 N. Wilmington Avenue, Compton, CA 90222	
Crenshaw	Branch; California corporate office	3683 Crenshaw Blvd., Los Angeles, CA 90016	
Grove Hall	Branch	648 Warren Street, Dorchester, MA 02121	
Miami	Branch	3275 NW 79th Street, Miami, FL. 33147	
Roxbury	Branch	2343 Washington Street, Roxbury, MA 02119	Temporarily closed

== See also ==
- Credit One Bank
- Citizens Financial Group
- U.S. Bancorp
- Carver Bancorp
- Freedman's Savings Bank
