= Ekaterina Sokova =

Russian artistic ymnast

- Full name: Ekaterina Olegovna Sokova
- Born: 12 December 2000 (age 25)

Gymnastics career
- Discipline: Women's artistic gymnastics
- Country represented: Russia
- Head coaches: A.V. Kulkova, A.V. Makeeva, M.I. Khorosheva

Ekaterina Olegovna Sokova (Russian: Екатерина Олеговна Сокова, born 12 December 2000) is a former Russian artistic gymnast. She resides in Vladimir, Russia, and was coached by A.V. Kulkova, A.V. Makeeva, M.I. Khorosheva.

== Junior career ==
=== 2013 & 2014 ===
At both the 2013 and 2014 L'International Gymnix, Sokova was on the gold-medal-winning Russian team.

=== 2015 ===
Sokova competed at the Junior Russian Championships on April 1–4, 2015. She won gold with her team, as well as a bronze in the all-around, 4th on the uneven bars, bronze on the balance beam, and won gold on the floor exercise.

Sokova turned senior in 2016, but did not earn any major assignments due to ongoing injuries.

== Retirement ==
In April 2017, Sokova uploaded a video to her YouTube channel ("Katrin Sokova") entitled "OPERATION. PROSTHESIS. COMPLETE HISTORY. FINISHED WITH SPORTS". She explained that her coaches did not allow time enough for her hip problems to heal, and that they believed she was fabricating her continued pain during training. Sokova continued through constant pain. Eventually, her mother refused to allow her to attend a national training camp, and instead took her for further medical evaluation.

It transpired that Sokova's hip was sufficiently damaged that she required a hip replacement, at the age of 16. Naturally, she will be forever unable to return to serious sports. Regarding the ordeal, Sokova commented that even if she could return, she would not choose to.

Online outrage without the gymnastics community was swift and enormous, as key Tumblr and forum users translated Sokova's 17-minute video into English within one day. Fans deplored the treatment of Sokova by her coaches, and noted parallels with Soviet gymnastics greats such as Yelena Mukhina, whose cast was removed prematurely by order of her coaches and never allowed to properly heal. There was an outpouring of supportive and sympathetic messages for Sokova across her YouTube channel and social networks, from both Russian and international fans.

== Competitive history ==
Year	Event	Team	AA	VT	UB	BB	FX
2013	L'International Gymnix (Junior International Cup)	1st					
2013	Olympic Hopes	1st	1st			1st	2nd
2013	KSI Cup (Youth)	1st	2nd				
2014	L'International Gymnix (Junior International Cup)	1st				6th	
2014	National Championships (Junior) (CMS)	1st	2nd	3rd	2nd	1st	2nd
2014	KSI Cup (Junior)	1st	1st				
2014	Russian Hopes (MS)		1st		2nd	2nd	WD
2014	Voronin Cup (Junior)			1st		1st	1st
2015	National Championships (Junior) (MS)	1st	3rd		4th	3rd	1st
2015	ITA-RUS-ROU-COL Friendly	1st					
