= Annika Urvikko =

Finnish artistic gymnast

- Full name: Annika Kristiin Urvikko
- Born: 17 November 1990 (age 35) Tampere, Finland
- Height: 157 cm (5 ft 2 in)

Gymnastics career
- Discipline: Women's artistic gymnastics
- Country represented: Finland
- Club: Tampereen Voimistelijat
- Head coaches: Igor Tšerepov, Riitta Harju-Villamo
- Choreographer: Maiju Missokia
Medal record
Women's artistic gymnastics
Representing Finland
Northern European Championships
Gold medal – first place	2014 Greve	Vault
Silver medal – second place	2014 Greve	All-around
Bronze medal – third place	2014 Greve	Team
FIG World Cup
Event	1st	2nd	3rd
Apparatus World Cup	0	0	1
World Challenge Cup	0	1	1
Total	0	1	2

Annika Kristiin Urvikko (born 17 November 1990) is a Finnish artistic gymnast who competed at the 2012 Summer Olympics. She won three medals at the 2014 Northern European Championships.

== Early life ==
Urvikko was born on 17 November 1990 in Tampere. Her great-grandfather, Vihtori Urvikko, was a wrestler who participated the 1912 Summer Olympics in Stockholm. Her father, Jouko Urvikko, played ice hockey top division at the national level.

== Gymnastics career ==
Urvikko began gymnastics in 1997. She joined the junior national team in 2004 and the senior team a year later. She competed at her first World Championships in 2006 and finished 107th in the all-around qualification round. She then finished 111th at the 2007 World Championships.

Urvikko won a bronze medal on the vault at the 2009 Maribor World Cup behind Russians Anna Myzdrikova and Ekaterina Kurbatova. Then at the 2009 World Championships, she finished 41st in the all-around qualification round. She then helped the Finnish team finish 27th in the qualification round at the 2010 World Championships.

Due to her results at the 2011 World Championships, Urvikko qualified for the 2012 Olympic Test Event. At that event, she qualified for the 2012 Summer Olympics. She was the only Finnish gymnast to qualify. Before Urvikko, the last Finnish gymnast to compete at the Olympics was Mauno Nissinen, who competed at the Munich Olympics 40 years before, and the last Finnish female gymnasts to compete at the Olympics were Eira Lehtonen and Kaarina Koskinen in 1964. At the Olympic Games, Urvikko scored a total of 48.815 points in the qualification round and did not advance to any finals, finishing 55th in the all-around.

Urvikko finished 37th in the all-around qualifications at the 2013 European Championships. She then qualified for the all-around final at the 2013 Summer Universiade and finished 20th. At the 2014 Northern European Championships, Urvikko helped the Finnish team win the bronze medal, and she won the silver medal in the individual all-around behind Maisie Methuen. She then won the gold medal in the vault final. She then competed at the 2014 World Championships and finished 120th in the all-around qualifications.

Urvikko won a silver medal on the uneven bars behind Ruby Harrold at the 2015 Osijek World Challenge Cup. She then won a bronze medal on the vault at the 2016 São Paulo World Challenge Cup. She represented Finland at the 2017 Summer Universiade and was the country's flag bearer in the opening ceremony. She finished 22nd in the all-around during the qualification round and helped the Finnish team place ninth.
