= 2013 Olympic Hopes =

The 2013 Olympic Hopes competition was a women's artistic gymnastics competition for junior gymnasts. The competition was held in Penza, Russia from June 19-21. The gymnasts competing were from Russia, Ukraine, Brazil, Turkey, Uzbekistan, Kazakhstan, and Lithuania.

== Schedule ==
Date	Event
19 June 2013	Team and All-Around Final
20 June 2013	Vault Final
20 June 2013	Uneven Bars Final
21 June 2013	Balance Beam Final
21 June 2013	Floor Final

== Medal winners ==
Event	Gold	Silver	Bronze
Women
Team all-around	Russia; Ekaterina Sokova; Seda Tutkhalyan; Daria Spiridonova; Evgenia Zhukova; Viktoria Kuzmina	Brazil; Tamires Veiga; Lorrane Oliveira; Mariana Oliveira	Turkey; Altin Cansu; Tutya Yulmaz; Morova Ekin
Individual all-around	Ekaterina Sokova (RUS)	Seda Tutkhalyan (RUS)	Yulmaz Tutya (TUR)
Vault	Seda Tutkhalyan (RUS)	Marianna Oliveira (BRA)	Anastasia Belkova (UZB)
Uneven Bars	Daria Spiridonova (RUS)	Viktoria Kuzmina (RUS)	Irina Sagaudak (UKR)
Balance Beam	Ekaterina Sokova (RUS)	Viktoria Kuzmina (RUS)	Yulmaz Tutya (TUR)
Floor Exercise	Lorrane Oliveira (BRA)	Morova Ekin (TUR); Seda Tutkhalyan (RUS); Ekaterina Sokova (RUS)	none awarded

=== Individual all-around ===
Position	Gymnast	Vault	Uneven bars	Balance beam	Floor	Total
1st place, gold medalist(s)	Ekaterina Sokova (RUS)	13.100	13.800	14.700	13.533	55.133
2nd place, silver medalist(s)	Seda Tutkhalyan (RUS)	13.466	13.433	13.900	13.600	54.399
	Daria Spiridonova (RUS)	13.566	14.066	13.600	12.800	54.032
3rd place, bronze medalist(s)	Yulmaz Tutya (TUR)	13.266	12.833	14.166	12.900	53.165
4	Tamires Veiga (BRA)	13.366	12.000	13.800	13.300	52.466
5	Yana Fedorova (UKR)	13.800	11.966	13.500	12.600	51.866
	Evgenia Zhukova (RUS)	13.400	13.566	13.200	11.433	51.599
6	Lorrane Oliveira (BRA)	13.566	11.366	12.700	13.533	51.165
	Marianna Oliveira (BRA)	14.133	12.266	13.766	10.800	50.965
7	Irina Sagaidak (UKR)	13.533	12.833	12.400	12.000	50.766
8	Ekin Mrova (TUR)	13.600	11.633	11.433	13.166	49.832
9	Elvina Amzayeva (UZB)	13.566	11.333	11.600	12.566	49.065
	Anastasia Tkachenko (UKR)	13.100	10.766	12.600	12.500	48.966
	Atin Cansu (TUR)	13.133	11.100	11.800	12.666	48.699
10	Anastasia Belkova (UZB)	13.400	12.200	11.333	11.600	48.533
11	Arailym Khanseitova (KAZ)	12.433	11.166	12.366	10.833	46.798
12	Alina Circene (LTU)	12.733	9.233	10.833	10.200	42.999
13	Sabine Gosa (LTU)	12.600	9.733	9.400	10.466	42.199
	Alexandra Kurchenko (LTU)	11.400	9.133	9.200	10.066	39.799
	Viktoria Kuzmina (RUS)		14.300	14.366		28.666

=== Vault ===
Rank	Gymnast	Score
1st place, gold medalist(s)	Seda Tuthalyan (RUS)	14.033
2nd place, silver medalist(s)	Marianna Oliveira (BRA)	13.733
3rd place, bronze medalist(s)	Anastasia Belkova (UZB)	13.499
4	Tamires Veiga (BRA)	13.249
5	Daria Spiridonova (RUS)	13.183
6	Irina Sagaudak (UKR)	13.099
7	Atin Cansu (TUR)	12.883
8	Elvina Amzaeva (UZB)	12.866

=== Uneven Bars ===
Rank	Gymnast	Score
1st place, gold medalist(s)	Daria Spiridonova (RUS)	14.266
2nd place, silver medalist(s)	Viktoria Kuzmina (RUS)	13.566
3rd place, bronze medalist(s)	Irina Sagaudak (UKR)	12.433
4	Anastasia Belkova (UZB)	12.266
5	Yulmaz Tutya (TUR)	12.233
6	Yana Fyodorova (UKR)	11.866
7	Tamires Veiga (BRA)	11.800
8	Morova Ekin (TUR)	11.533

=== Balance Beam ===
Rank	Gymnast	Score
1st place, gold medalist(s)	Ekaterina Sokova (RUS)	14.333
2nd place, silver medalist(s)	Viktoria Kuzmina (RUS)	14.033
3rd place, bronze medalist(s)	Yulmaz Tutya (TUR)	13.966
4	Tamires Veiga (BRA)	13.933
5	Marianna Oliveira (BRA)	13.466
6	Yana Fyodorova (UKR)	11.333
7	Anastasia Tkachenko (UKR)	10.933
8	Arailym Khanseitova (KAZ)	10.700

=== Floor Exercise ===
Rank	Gymnast	Score
1st place, gold medalist(s)	Lorrane Oliveira (BRA)	14.033
2nd place, silver medalist(s)	Morova Ekin (TUR)	13.233
2nd place, silver medalist(s)	Seda Tuthalyan (RUS)	13.233
2nd place, silver medalist(s)	Ekaterina Sokova (RUS)	13.233
5	Yulmaz Tutya (TUR)	12.900
6	Tamires Veiga (BRA)	12.733
7	Yana Fyodorova (UKR)	12.566
8	Elvina Amzaeva (UZB)	11.300
