= Eira Lehtonen =

Finnish artistic gymnast

Eira Lydiard
Personal information
- Birth name: Eira Marita Lehtonen
- Born: 22 January 1939; Turku, Finland
- Died: 24 November 1984 (aged 45); Auckland, New Zealand

Eira Lydiard (22 January 1939, in Turku – 24 November 1984) was a Finnish gymnast. Eira Lehtonen finished the Rome 1960 Summer Olympics gymnastics team event in 13th and the 8-game for 82nd place. The Tokyo 1964 Summer Olympics 8-game, she finished 66th. She took part in the World Championships in 1958, 1962 and 1966 and European championships between 1963 and 1965.

At club level, Eira Lehtonen represented the Turku Sports League. She won the Finnish championship in a match in 1961, 1964 and 1966 boom years from 1955 to 1959 and 1966, parallel bars in 1956 and 1958, and the jump in 1966. In 1977 Eira Lehtonen married famous New Zealand endurance running coach Arthur Lydiard.

== Sources ==
Siukonen, Markku: Urheilukunniamme defenders - the Finnish Olympic representatives 1906-2000, p 172 Graface Jyväskylä, 2001. ISBN 951-98673-1-7 .
