= Monica Sileoni =

Finnish artistic gymnast

- Full name: Maria Monica Sileoni
- Born: 22 October 1999 (age 26) Espoo, Finland
- Height: 152 cm (5 ft 0 in)

Gymnastics career
- Discipline: Women's artistic gymnastics
- Country represented: Finland (2013–2015)
Medal record
Women's artistic gymnastics
Representing Finland
Northern European Championships
Bronze medal – third place	2014 Greve	Team

Maria Monica Sileoni (born 22 October 1999) is a Finnish former artistic gymnast. She represented Finland at the 2014 Summer Youth Olympics and at the 2015 World Artistic Gymnastics Championships. She won a team bronze medal at the 2014 Northern European Championships.

== Early life ==
Sileoni was born on 22 October 1999 in Espoo. Her paternal grandfather is Italian and her paternal grandmother is Argentine.

== Gymnastics career ==
Sileoni made her international debut at the 2013 Nordic Junior Championships and placed sixth in the uneven bars final. She helped the Finnish team win the bronze medal behind Sweden and Norway. She then competed with the Finnish team that finished 19th at the 2013 European Youth Olympic Festival.

Sileoni competed at the 2014 European Championships and finished 45th in the all-around during the qualification round. She was then selected to represent Finland at the 2014 Summer Youth Olympics and finished 36th in the all-around qualifications. She won a bronze medal with the Finnish team at the 2014 Northern European Championships. At the 2014 Voronin Cup, she won a bronze medal in the team event and in the floor exercise final.

Sileoni became age-eligible for senior international competitions in 2015. She competed at the 2015 European Championships and finished 41st in the all-around qualifications. At the 2015 Finnish Championships, she finished sixth in the all-around. She finished fourth in the floor exercise final at the 2015 Northern European Championships. She then competed at the 2015 World Championships and finished 143rd in the all-around during the qualification round. This was the final competition of her career.
