= Megan Roberts =

Canadian artistic gymnast

- Born: November 21, 2000 (age 25) Toronto, Ontario

Gymnastics career
- Discipline: Women's artistic gymnastics
- Country represented: Canada
- Club: East York Gymnastics
- Head coaches: Lawson Hamer, Lisa Cowan
Medal record
Representing Canada
Pacific Rim Championships
Silver medal – second place	2014 Richmond	Team
Silver medal – second place	2016 Everett	Team

Megan Roberts (born November 21, 2000) is a senior elite Canadian artistic gymnast and a member of the Canada National team. She trains at East York Gymnastics, coached by Lawson Hamer and Lisa Cowan.

== Novice career ==
=== 2013 ===
Roberts made her debut at the Elite Canada, winning every event except beam, on which she placed sixth. At the Canadian Championships that year, she won vault and floor exercise gold, all-around silver, and placed fourth on bars and fifth on beam.

== Junior career ==
=== 2014 ===
Roberts competed at the Elite Canada in February, placing fourth in the all-around, fifth on bars, and sixth on vault. She was named to the Canadian team for the International Gymnix, her international debut, where she won silver with her team and placed ninth in the all-around. She went on to compete at the Junior Pan American Championships, winning team gold and placing fourth in the all-around and on uneven bars. In April, she competed at the Pacific Rim Championships, winning team silver and placing eighth on beam and eleventh in the all-around. In May, Roberts competed at the Canadian Championships in Ottawa, winning silver on both the vault and floor, bronze in the all-around, and placing fourth on bars. In November, she competed at the Elite Gym Massilia in France. In the Open division, she won team and balance beam silver and placed tenth in the all-around. In the Master division, she placed fourth on floor, fifth with her team, sixth on vault, and twenty-fifth in the all-around.

=== 2015 ===
Roberts competed at the Elite Canada in January, she won gold in the all-arounds. In the Event finals she won gold on bars, floor and vault and bronze on beam. In February, Roberts competed with Team Ontario at the 2015 Canada Winter Games. She won Silver in the Team Event, Bronze in the All Arounds and was the only gymnast to win more than one final in the women's event taking Gold on both vault and floor and a silver medal on beam to cap a strong overall performance. In March, Roberts competed with Team Canada at Gymnix International, where they won Gold and she placed fifth in the all-arounds. She also won Silver on both vault and floor in the event finals. Later in March, Roberts competed with Team Canada at the City of Jesolo Trophy where they won Silver. Roberts also won Bronze in the Floor Event finals.

In May, Roberts competed at the Canadian Championships in Gatineau, winning Gold in the All Arounds with a score of 55.400. In the Event Finals, she won Gold on Vault and Floor as well as Silver on Bars. She had the highest score on Vault 15.050 and Floor 14.2 of all Juniors and Seniors both days combined. Megan also won the Juniors Qualification round with 1st place on Bars, Vault and Floor. As well, she was chosen as the Junior High Performance athlete of the year and received an award for earning Medals for Canada in International events.

In September, Roberts competed at the Japan Junior International. She won Silver on Floor in the event finals.

== Senior career ==
=== 2016 ===
Roberts made her Senior debut in January at Elite Canada in Halifax Nova Scotia. She won Silver in the All-Arounds and Bronze on floor in the Event Finals. In April, she competed at the 2016 Pacific Rim Gymnastics Championships, winning team silver and placing fifth on balance beam and sixth on floor exercise in the event finals. In June, Megan competed at the 2016 Canadian Gymnastics Championships in Edmonton. In the qualification round, she placed 4th with a score of 55.200 and in the All Around/Event Finals she placed 5th with a score of 54.950. She won the Bronze on Bars and placed 4th on Beam.

At the beginning of July, she competed at the Rio Olympic selection camp in Gatineau, Que. She came in 3rd (54.717) on Day 1 and 5th (54.250) on Day 2. She was named 1st alternate to the team.

=== 2017 ===
In February, Roberts competed at Elite Canada, she placed 4th in the all-arounds and won Gold on floor and 4th on beam in the Event Finals.

=== 2018 ===
In February, Roberts competed at Elite Canada, she placed 8th in the all-arounds.

In May, Roberts competed at The Canadian National Championships, she placed 13th in the two day combined all-arounds.

In September, Roberts started her NCAA career with the Georgia Gym Dogs.

== Competitive History ==
Year	Event	Team	AA	VT	UB	BB	FX
2013	Elite Canada Novice		1st	1st	1st	3rd	1st
2013	Novice National Championships		2nd	1st	4th	5th	1st
2014	Elite Canada Junior		4th	6th	5th		
2014	International Gymnix	2nd	9th				
2014	Junior Pam Am Games	1st	4th		4th		
2014	Pacific Rim Championships	2nd	11th			8th	
2014	Junior National Championships		3rd	2nd	4th		2nd
2014	Elite Gym OPEN Massilia	2nd	10th				
2014	Elite Gym MASTERS Massilia	5th	25th	6th			4th
2014	Elite Gym TOP Massilia						4th
2015	Elite Canada Junior		1st	1st	1st	2nd	1st
2015	Canada Winter Games	2nd	3rd	1st		2nd	1st
2015	International Gymnix	1st	5th	2nd			2nd
2015	City of Jesolo Trophy	2nd					3rd
2015	Junior National Championships		1st	1st	2nd		1st
2015	Japan Junior International		12th				2nd
2016	Elite Canada Senior		2nd				3rd
2016	Pacific Rim Championships	2nd				5th	6th
2016	Senior National Championships		5th		3rd	4th	
2017	Elite Canada Senior		4th				1st
2017	Gymnix International Senior	1st					2nd
2018	Elite Canada Senior		8th				
2018	Senior National Championships		12th				
