= Madelaine Leydin =

Australian gymnast

Madelaine Leydin (born July 28, 1997) is an Australian gymnast. She won Australia's National Senior All-Around title in 2013. She was part of Australia's team for the 2015 World Championships. In 2017 Leydin began competing for the Arizona Wildcats in the United States.

== Early life ==
Leydin was born in Mebourne, Victoria to parents Scott and Lisa. Leydin has one younger sister. She began practicing gymnastics at six years old following a cousin's gymnastics birthday party.

== Gymnastics career ==
As a junior gymnast, Leydin represented Australia at the 2011 Commonwealth Youth Olympics. Leydin won Australia's National Senior All-Around title in 2013 when she was 15 years old. The following year, Leydin suffered a foot injury which affected her ability to perform leading up to the 2014 national championships. That year, she finished second at the national championships. In 2015, Leydin finished third in the all-around at nationals and was part of Australia's gymnastics team for the 2015 World Championships in Glasgow, Scotland. Her final year competing in Australian nationals was 2016 when she placed seventh in the all-around event. Leydin trained at the Victorian Womens High Performance centre.

=== College gymnast ===
In 2017, Leydin competed for the Arizona Wildcats in the United States. Leydin was out for the majority of the season due to injury, but was well enough to compete at three meets and the NCAA gymnastics Regionals held in Lincoln, Nebraska. She was named a Scholastic All-American in 2017.
