= Bank officer =

Employee of a bank

A bank officer is an employee of a bank endowed with the legal capacity to agree to and sign documents on behalf of the institution. The title is usually held by branch managers, assistant managers, loan officers, and other experienced personnel. Executives are considered officers of the bank for legal purposes.

The title is also used to designate those branch personnel who act in a supervisory capacity and ensure good customer service.

In larger banks, an officer at the branch level sometimes reviews accounts and makes decisions on whether to honour NSF items or to return them. Such decisions are usually left up to those who are legally responsible to act on behalf of the bank.

== See also ==
- Bank
- Executive officer
- Chief financial officer
