= Raer Theaker =

Welsh artistic gymnast (born 1997)

- Full name: Raer Leigh Theaker
- Nickname: Rae
- Born: 30 April 1997 (age 29) Cardiff, Wales, United Kingdom

Gymnastics career
- Discipline: Women's artistic gymnastics
- Country represented: (United Kingdom) Great Britain; Wales (2011–2016)
- Club: Cardiff Central Youth
- Retired: 2016
Medal record
Representing Wales
Commonwealth Games
Bronze medal – third place	2014 Glasgow	Team
Northern European Championships
Gold medal – first place	2015 Limerick	Team

Raer Leigh Theaker (born 30 April 1997) is a Welsh retired artistic gymnast. She was part of the Welsh teams that won a gold medal at the 2015 Northern European Championships and a historic bronze medal at the 2014 Commonwealth Games. She is the 2014 and 2015 Welsh all-around champion.

== Gymnastics career ==
Theaker began gymnastics when she was six years old. She was invited to train at the Wales Women’s National High Performance Centre when she was ten years old.

At the 2011 Commonwealth Youth Games, Theaker won a silver medal with the Welsh team and also won silver medals on the uneven bars and balance beam. She won the vault titles at both the 2011 and 2012 British Championships. She was selected to compete for Great Britain at the 2012 Junior European Championships, where the British team finished fourth.

Theaker became age-eligible for senior international competition in 2013 and finished sixth in the all-around at her first senior British Championships. She also won a silver medal on the floor exercise, behind Gabrielle Jupp. She made her senior international debut at the 2013 Austrian Team Open, helping Great Britain win the team competition and winning a bronze medal in the all-around. She competed at the 2013 Glasgow World Cup and placed eighth in the all-around.

Theaker became the Welsh all-around champion in March 2014. She then finished fourth in the all-around at the British Championships. She was then selected to represent Wales at the 2014 Commonwealth Games and helped Wales win its first-ever Commonwealth Games team medal in artistic gymnastics. She also advanced into the uneven bars final, but she fell twice and was unable to finish her routine. Wales Gymnastics named her the Women’s Artistic Gymnast of the Year.

Theaker finished 13th in the all-around at the 2015 WOGA Classic. At the 2015 Welsh Championships, she successfully defended her all-around title. She then competed with the British team that placed fifth at the 2015 FIT Challenge. She helped Wales win the team competition at the 2015 Northern European Championships. She only competed on the balance beam at the 2016 Welsh Championships due to injury and finished second. She announced her retirement in March 2016 and began coaching.
