= Anna Rodionova =

Russian artistic gymnast (born 1996)

- Full name: Anna Aleksandrovna Rodionova
- Born: 21 November 1996 (age 29) Yoshkar-Ola, Mari El Republic, Russia
- Height: 1.54 m (5 ft 1 in)

Gymnastics career
- Discipline: Women's artistic gymnastics
- Country represented: Russia; (2010 - 2015)
- Club: Volga Federal District
- Head coach: Georgy Fomenko
- Former coach: Yulia Tyulkina
- Music: "One Kalina" by Sofiya Rotaru (2010-2011)
- Retired: 2015
Medal record
Representing Russia
European Championships
Bronze medal – third place	2014 Sofia	Team

Anna Aleksandrovna Rodionova (Russian: Анна Александровна Родионова; born 21 November 1996) is a Russian former artistic gymnast. She competed at the 2013 World Championships and won a bronze medal at the 2014 European Championships.

== Junior career ==
=== 2010 ===
At the 2010 Russian National Championships, Rodionova won all-around bronze in the Candidate for Master of Sport division behind Anastasia Grishina and Anastasia Sidorova with a two-day total of 111.750. She also won bronze on vault and silver on uneven bars. Rodionova made her international debut at the 2010 Pacific Rim Championships. She won a bronze medal in the all-around with a 53.450 behind Americans Jordyn Wieber and Kyla Ross, and she finished sixth on vault and beam. She competed at the 2010 Eurasian Youth Games and won team gold with Anastasia Sidorova, Kristina Sidorova, Evgenia Shelgunova, and Maria Dunayeva. Rodionova won silver in the all-around, uneven bars, and balance beam.

=== 2011 ===
Rodionova won three bronze medals in the Junior Master of Sport division of the 2011 Russian National Championships. She finished behind Anastasia Grishina and Anastasia Sidorova in the all-around with a two-day total of 106.025. Her other bronze medals were won on vault and beam. She competed at the 2011 City of Jesolo Trophy and won silver in the junior team competition with Grishina, Anastasia Sidorova, Kristina Sidorova, Shelgunova, and Yulia Chemaryova. Rodionova had a poor performance, scoring only 49.900 in the all-around. Rodionova competed at the 2011 European Youth Summer Olympic Festival where the Russian team finished in fourth. She finished 5th in the all-around final with a 53.850. She finished 7th in the balance beam final and 5th in the floor final.

== Senior career ==
=== 2012 ===
In January, Rodionova was selected for the Olympic training squad which was for the gymnasts that could have contended for a spot on the Russian Olympic team. She was the youngest gymnast selected. At the 2012 Russian National Championships, Rodionova placed eighth in the all-around with a 54.434. She finished fourth on the uneven bars and seventh on balance beam. Rodionova's first senior international meet was the 2012 City of Jesolo Trophy. Along with Anastasia Grishina, Yulia Inshina, and Yulia Belokobylskaya, she won a bronze medal in the team event. She finished 14th in the all-around with a 54.300, but Grishina was the only Russian to score higher than her. Rodionova competed at the 2012 Russian Cup where the Volga team won bronze. She finished tenth in the all-around with a 51.100. She was not selected to compete at the 2012 Summer Olympics. She competed at the Stuttgart World Cup and won team gold with Aliya Mustafina, Kristina Goryunova, and Inshina.

=== 2013 ===
Rodionova's first meet of the season was the Anadia World Cup where she place eighth on the uneven bars. She competed at the 2013 Russian Cup where the Volga Federal District team won silver behind Saint Petersburg. She finished fourth in the all-around with a 55.093. In the event finals, Rodionova finished sixth on uneven bars and balance beam.

==== 2013 World Championships ====
After Ksenia Afanasyeva had ankle surgery, Mustafina, Tatiana Nabieva, and Maria Paseka were named to the 2013 World Championship team. The fourth spot was between Viktoria Komova and Rodionova. Komova, who had viral meningitis, was told not to compete by doctors. Originally, Rodionova was scheduled to do balance beam only. However, Paseka withdrew due to back injury, and Nabieva suffered a fall that caused a large bruise on her forehead, and she only competed uneven bars. Rodionova competed all-around in the qualification round. She qualified for the all-around final in fifteenth with a 54.599. She qualified for the balance beam final in fourth behind Larisa Iordache, Shang Chunsong, and Kyla Ross with a 14.466. She finished sixteenth in the all-around final with a 53.298. She finished in last place in the balance beam final after falling on her Arabian salto.

After the World Championships, Rodionova competed at the 2013 Elite Gym Massilia with Alla Sosnitskaya, Ekaterina Kramarenko, and Evgenia Shelgunova. The team won silver behind Romania, and Rodionova finished tenth in the all-around with a 53.550. She finished sixth in the uneven bars final with a 12.233. She and her teammates – Kramarenko, Mustafina, and Nabieva – won silver behind China at the Stuttgart World Cup.

=== 2014 ===
In March 2014, Rodionova competed at the Cottbus World Cup event with Maria Kharenkova, Polina Fedorova and Daria Spiridonova. She qualified to the uneven bars final in second place and in the final won the silver medal behind Sophie Scheder of Germany. In May 2014, she competed at the European Championships in Sofia, Bulgaria. In qualifications she contributed scores of 13.933 on vault and 14.866 on uneven bars. In the team finals she contributed a score of 13.433 on uneven bars towards the Russian team's bronze medal finish. In August she competed at the Russian Cup and finished fourth with her team and sixth on the uneven bars.

Rodionova announced her retirement in 2015. After the 2014 European Championships, she sustained an ankle injury that she never recovered from.

== Competitive history ==
Year	Event	Team	AA	VT	UB	BB	FX
2010	National Championships (Junior) (CMS)		3rd	3rd	2nd		
2010	Pacific Rim Championships (Junior)		3rd	6th		6th	
2010	Eurasian Youth Games	1st	2nd		2nd	2nd	
2011	National Championships (Junior) (MS)		3rd	3rd	5th	3rd	6th
2011	City of Jesolo Trophy	2nd					
2011	European Youth Summer Olympic Festival	4th	5th			7th	5th
2012	National Championships	5th	8th		4th	7th	
2012	City of Jesolo Trophy	3rd					
2012	Russian Cup	3rd	10th		5th		
2012	Stuttgart World Cup	1st					
2013	Anadia World Cup				8th		
2013	Russian Cup	2nd	4th		6th	6th	
2013	World Championships		16th			8th	
2013	Massilia Cup (Master Massilia)	2nd	10th		6th		
2013	Stuttgart World Cup	2nd					
2014	Cottbus World Cup				2nd		
2014	National Championships	4th			2nd		
2014	European Championships	3rd					
2014	Russian Cup	4th			6th		
2015	Russian Hopes	5th	2nd				

Year	Competition description	Location	Apparatus	Rank-Final	Score-Final	Rank-Qualifying	Score-Qualifying
2013	World Championships	Antwerp	All-around	16	53.298	15	54.599
2013	World Championships	Antwerp	Uneven bars			17	13.800
2013	World Championships	Antwerp	Balance beam	8	13.100	4	14.466
2013	World Championships	Antwerp	Floor exercise			47	12.400
2014	European Championships	Sofia	Team	3	169.329	3	170.621
2014	European Championships	Sofia	Uneven bars			5	14.866
