= Yulia Belokobylskaya =

Russian artistic gymnast (born 1995)

- Full name: Yulia Yurievna Belokobylskaya
- Nickname: Belo
- Born: 14 December 1995 (age 30) Rostov-on-Don, Russia

Gymnastics career
- Discipline: Women's artistic gymnastics
- Country represented: Russia; (2009–2012)
- Head coach: Nadezhda Dolgoshina
- Retired: 2013
Medal record
Event	1st	2nd	3rd
World Championships	0	1	0
European Championships	0	0	1
Representing Russia
World Championships
Silver medal – second place	2011 Tokyo	Team
European Championships
Bronze medal – third place	2011 Berlin	Floor exercise

Yulia Yurievna Belokobylskaya (Russian: Ю́лия Ю́рьевна Белокобы́льская; born 14 December 1995) is a Russian former artistic gymnast. She is the 2011 Russian champion and European bronze medalist on the floor exercise. She also won a silver medal with the Russian team at the 2011 World Championships.

== Career ==
=== Junior ===
At the International Gymnix in Montreal in March 2009, Belokobylskaya won a bronze medal with the Russian team. She also won a bronze medal on the floor exercise, and she finished seventh on the vault and eighth in the all-around.

=== Senior ===
==== 2011 ====
In February, Belokobylskaya competed at the Russian Championships. She won gold on the floor exercise and bronze on the balance beam, and she finished fifth in the all-around. She then competed at the Cottbus Challenger Cup, where she finished seventh on the uneven bars. At the City of Jesolo Trophy later in March, she won bronze with the Russian team and finished seventh in the all-around with a score of 54.650.

Belokobylskaya competed at the European Championships where she won a bronze medal on the floor exercise with a score of 14.450 (just 0.050 behind the gold medal winner, Sandra Izbaşa). At the Russian Cup, she won the bronze medal in the all-around behind Anna Dementyeva and Viktoria Komova. In the event finals, she won the bronze medals on the uneven bars, balance beam, and floor exercise.

Belokobylskaya competed at the World Championships alongside Ksenia Afanasyeva, Viktoria Komova, Anna Dementyeva, Tatiana Nabieva, and Yulia Inshina. In the team finals, she competed on the floor exercise and scored a 14.633 to help the team win the silver medal behind the United States.

==== 2012–2013 ====
At the 2012 Russian Championships, she finished ninth in the all-around. In the event finals, she finished fifth on the uneven bars and fourth on the balance beam, and she won the bronze medal on the floor exercise behind Anastasia Grishina and Ksenia Afanasyeva. Then at the 2012 Russian Cup, she placed seventh in the all-around. She was not selected for the Olympic team. In November 2012, she competed at the Swiss Cup with Igor Pakhomenko, and they finished seventh in the team competition.

Belokobylskaya retired from gymnastics in 2013.

== Competitive history ==
Year	Event	Team	AA	VT	UB	BB	FX
2009	International Gymnix	3rd place, bronze medalist(s)	8	7			3rd place, bronze medalist(s)
2011	Russian Championships		5	5		3rd place, bronze medalist(s)	1st place, gold medalist(s)
2011	Cottbus World Cup				7		
2011	City of Jesolo Trophy	3rd place, bronze medalist(s)	7				
2011	European Championships						3rd place, bronze medalist(s)
2011	Russian Cup		3rd place, bronze medalist(s)		3rd place, bronze medalist(s)	3rd place, bronze medalist(s)	3rd place, bronze medalist(s)
2011	World Championships	2nd place, silver medalist(s)					
2012	Russian Championships	6	9		5	4	3rd place, bronze medalist(s)
2012	Russian Cup	4	7				
2012	Swiss Cup	7					

Year	Competition Description	Location	Apparatus	Rank-Final	Score-Final	Rank-Qualifying	Score-Qualifying
2011	European Championships	Berlin	All-Around			6	55.550
2011	European Championships	Berlin	Uneven Bars			19	13.500
2011	European Championships	Berlin	Balance Beam			12	14.075
2011	European Championships	Berlin	Floor Exercise	3	14.450	4	14.275
2011	World Championships	Tokyo	Team	2	175.329	2	231.062
2011	World Championships	Tokyo	Balance Beam			19	14.333
2011	World Championships	Tokyo	Floor Exercise			13	14.133
