= Hanna Traukova =

Belarusian artistic gymnast

- Full name: Hanna Aliaksandrauna Traukova
- Nickname: Anya
- Born: 1 August 2001 (age 25) Grodno, Belarus
- Height: 162 cm (5 ft 4 in)

Gymnastics career
- Discipline: Women's artistic gymnastics
- Country represented: Belarus (2015-2021)
- Club: Specialised Children's-Youth School of Olympic Reserve No.3
- Head coach: Olga Knysh

Hanna Aliaksandrauna Traukova (Belarusian: Ганна Аляксандраўна Траўкова; born 1 August 2001) is a Belarusian former artistic gymnast who competed at the 2020 Olympic Games.

== Personal life ==
Traukova began gymnastics when she was five years old. She is a student at Yanka Kupala State University of Grodno. Her hobbies include cycling and swimming.

== Gymnastics career ==
=== Junior ===
Traukova made her international debut at the 2015 European Youth Olympic Festival, and she helped the Belarusian team finish sixteenth. At the 2016 Stella Zakharova Cup, she won the gold medal in the all-around and a bronze medal in the team event. In the event finals, she finished fifth on the uneven bars, eighth on the floor exercise, and she won the bronze medal on the balance beam. She then competed at the 2016 Junior European Championships and helped the team finish fourteenth. At the 2016 Belarusian Championships, she won the silver medal in the all-around behind Dziyana Kirykovich. She also won the gold medal on the uneven bars and the bronze medal on the floor exercise. Then at the 2016 Voronin Cup, she finished twelfth in the all-around.

=== Senior ===
==== 2017 ====
Traukova made her senior debut at the Valkina Memorial where she won the gold medal in the all-around. She also won the gold medal on the uneven bars and the silver medal on the floor exercise, and she placed fourth on the balance beam. Then at the Stella Zakharova Cup, she finished fifth in the all-around, fourth with the team, eighth on the uneven bars, and sixth on the floor exercise, and she won the gold medal on the balance beam. She competed at the European Championships, but she did not qualify for any finals.

==== 2018 ====
In 2018, Traukova began competing in the Bundesliga series in Germany as a part of the Eintracht Frankfurt club. At the 2nd Bundesliga, she won the gold medal in the all-around and helped her club win the bronze medal. Then at the 3rd Bundesliga, she finished eleventh in the all-around and her club finished fifth. At the Dityatin Cup, Traukova won the bronze medal in the all-around behind Russian gymnasts Tatiana Nabieva and Polina Fedorova. In the event finals, she finished seventh on vault, and she won silver medals on the uneven bars, balance beam, and floor exercise. She finished fourth in the all-around at the Belarusian Championships, and she won the gold medal in the vault final and the bronze medal in the uneven bars final, and she finished fifth in the floor exercise final. She then competed at the World Championships and helped the Belarusian team finish thirty-ninth in the qualification round. At the 4th Bundesliga, she won the gold medal in the all-around and helped the Eintracht Frankfurt club finish fourth. Then at the Voronin Cup, she won the bronze medal in the all-around behind Alyona Shchennikova and Yeo Seo-jeong. She also finished seventh on the uneven bars and balance beam and eighth on the floor exercise.

==== 2019-2022 ====
At the 2019 1st Bundesliga, Traukova finished sixth in the all-around and the Eintracht Frankfurt finished seventh. She competed at the 2019 World Championships and finished ninety-seventh in the all-around during the qualification round. She was not initially granted a spot for the 2020 Olympic Games as Anastasiya Alistratava placed ahead of her. However, in July 2021, Traukova received the spot after Alistratava withdrew.

Traukova won the gold medal in the team event, all-around, vault, and balance beam and the bronze medal on the uneven bars and floor exercise at the 2021 Belarusian Open Cup. She then represented Belarus at the 2020 Summer Olympics. During the qualification round, she finished seventy-seventh in the all-around with a total score of 46.232.

In March 2022, Russian and Belarusian athletes, including Traukova, were banned from taking part in FIG-sanctioned competitions due to the 2022 Russian invasion of Ukraine. The 2020 Summer Olympics were the final international competition of her career.

== Competitive history ==
Competitive history of Hanna Traukova at the junior level
Year	Event	Team	AA	VT	UB	BB	FX
2015	European Youth Olympic Festival	16					
2016	Stella Zakharova Cup	3rd place, bronze medalist(s)	1st place, gold medalist(s)		5	3rd place, bronze medalist(s)	8
2016	Junior European Championships	14					
2016	Belarusian Championships		2nd place, silver medalist(s)		1st place, gold medalist(s)		3rd place, bronze medalist(s)
2016	Voronin Cup		12				

Competitive history of Hanna Traukova at the senior level
Year	Event	Team	AA	VT	UB	BB	FX
2017	Valkina Memorial		1st place, gold medalist(s)		1st place, gold medalist(s)	4	2nd place, silver medalist(s)
2017	Stella Zakharova Cup	4	5		8	1st place, gold medalist(s)	6
2018	2nd Bundesliga	3rd place, bronze medalist(s)	1st place, gold medalist(s)				
2018	3rd Bundesliga	5	11				
2018	Dityatin Cup		3rd place, bronze medalist(s)	7	2nd place, silver medalist(s)	2nd place, silver medalist(s)	2nd place, silver medalist(s)
2018	Belarusian Championships		4	1st place, gold medalist(s)	3rd place, bronze medalist(s)		5
2018	World Championships	39					
2018	4th Bundesliga	4	1st place, gold medalist(s)				
2018	Voronin Cup		3rd place, bronze medalist(s)		7	7	8
2019	1st Bundesliga	7	6				
2019	World Championships		97				
2021	Belarusian Open Cup	1st place, gold medalist(s)	1st place, gold medalist(s)	1st place, gold medalist(s)	3rd place, bronze medalist(s)	1st place, gold medalist(s)	3rd place, bronze medalist(s)
2021	Olympic Games		77				
