= Ekaterina Kramarenko =

Russian artistic gymnast

- Full name: Ekaterina Aleksandrovna Kramarenko
- Nickname: Kramaro
- Born: 22 April 1991 (age 35) Leningrad, Russian SFSR, Soviet Union

Gymnastics career
- Discipline: Women's artistic gymnastics
- Country represented: Russia
- Club: CSKA
- Head coaches: N.N. Kovruzhnikh, A.B. Cherentsova
- Retired: January 19, 2016
Medal record
Representing Russia
World Championships
Bronze medal – third place	2014 Nanning	Team
European Championships
Bronze medal – third place	2007 Amsterdam	Uneven Bars
Summer Universiade
Gold medal – first place	2015 Gwangju	Team
Gold medal – first place	2015 Gwangju	Uneven Bars

Ekaterina Aleksandrovna Kramarenko (Russian: Екатерина Александровна Крамаренко, born April 22, 1991, in Leningrad) is a Russian artistic gymnast. She is the 2007 European bronze medalist on the uneven bars and 2014 World bronze medalist in the team competition.

== Senior career ==
At the 2007 European Championships, Kramarenko placed 5th in the all-around final and won the bronze medal on the uneven bars.

=== 2007 World Championships ===
At the 2007 World Championships team final Kramarenko bailed on her vault and placed her hands on the vaulting table to stop her momentum. This automatically earned her a score of zero, dropping the Russian team from medal contention to last place. Kramarenko needed only a mediocre score to secure the bronze medal for Russia and theoretically could have sat down her vault and still won the medal. She was inconsolable after her vault and was comforted by her teammate Yulia Lozhechko as Elena Zamolodchikova completed her vault, knowing her score would not matter. This controversy reignited debate among the gymnastics community about the '3 up, 3 count' team final format and whether it ought to be abolished and the final reverted to a format where a score can be dropped.

When asked to comment on the incident, Russian coach Andrei Rodionenko explained, "Nobody knows what happened, it was a shock for everyone."

=== 2008 Olympics ===
Kramarenko was selected to represent Russia at the 2008 Summer Olympics. In the preliminary round she started off by sticking her double twisting Yurchenko, the vault she failed at during the last World Championships. She also rebounded on bars, scoring a 15.500. On beam, she had a fall on her front pike somersault, and only scored 14.625. She did a solid floor routine to earn 15.150 and a place in the floor exercise final. Even though she was 10th all around after the preliminary routine, she could not compete in the all around final due to the two per country rule. She went on to have solid performances in the team competition, bringing in 15.500 on bars and 15.125 on floor, contributing the highest score on the latter. However, multiple mistakes from her teammates, including two falls on beam and two large out of bounds deductions on floor, dropped Russia to 4th place, less than a point behind Romania. She placed fifth in the floor final with a score of 15.050.

=== 2012–2013 ===
Kramarenko continued to compete after Beijing, and even after London. In October 2012, she won gold on uneven bars and placed fourth in the all-around at the Dityatin Cup. In the summer of 2013, she was named the alternate to the Russian team for the Universiade, but she won gold with her team at the Russian Cup in August. She also placed fifth in the all-around, fourth on uneven bars, and eighth on balance beam. She went on to compete at the Osijek World Cup, winning gold on bars and finishing fifth on floor.

In late October, she was named to the Russian team for the Élite Gym Massilia in November. In the Master Team division, the Russian team placed second in the all-around, bars, and beam, and fourth on vault and floor. Individually, she won silver on bars, bronze in the all-around, and placed fifth on beam. She qualified to the Top Massilia, where she placed sixth on beam and tied for gold on bars with France's Louise Vanhille. However, a tie breaker was induced, and the gold was awarded to Vanhille, giving Kramarenko the silver.

She was named to the Russian team for the Team Challenge at the Stuttgart World Cup, where they won the silver medal.

=== 2014 ===
Kramarenko competed at the 2014 Russian Cup and won a silver medal with her team. She finished fourth in the uneven bars final with a score of 14.767, and she finished fifth in the all-around. She was put on the team that represented Russia at the 2014 World Championships along with Maria Kharenkova, Maria Paseka, Alla Sosnitskaya, Aliya Mustafina, and Daria Spiridonova. The team won bronze.

=== 2015 ===
Kramarenko competed at the Russian Championships in March 2015. She placed 4th with her team. Individually, she placed 6th in the all-around and won a silver on the uneven bars. She later withdrew from the floor exercise finals.

=== 2016 ===
Kramarenko's retirement, at age 24, was announced along with 2012 Olympian Anastasia Grishina and two-time World team member, Tatiana Nabieva, on January 19, 2016.

== Competitive history ==
Year	Event	Team	AA	VT	UB	BB	FX
2007	European Championships		5th		3rd		
2007	World Championships	8th	13th				
2008	Russian Cup		3rd		6th	7th	
2008	Olympic Games	4th					5th
2011	Russian Cup		7th				
2013	National Championships	4th	8th			7th	
2013	Dityatin Cup	1st			1st	1st	2nd
2013	Russian Cup	1st	5th		4th	8th	
2013	Osijek World Cup				1st		5th
2013	Massilia Cup (Master Massilia)	2nd	3rd		2nd	6th	
2013	Stuttgart World Cup	2nd					
2014	National Championships	3rd	4th		4th		6th
2014	Russian Cup	2nd	5th		4th		
2014	World Championships	3rd					
2014	Stuttgart World Cup	2nd					
2014	Voronin Cup	1st	1st		1st	1st	2nd
2015	National Championships	4th	6th		2nd		WD
2015	Bundesliga	4th	1st				
2015	Universiade	1st			1st		

Year	Competition description	Location	Apparatus	Rank-Final	Score-Final	Rank-Qualifying	Score-Qualifying
2007	European Championships	Amsterdam	All-around	5	57.825	13	56.075
2007	European Championships	Amsterdam	Uneven bars	3	15.425	7	14.675
2007	European Championships	Amsterdam	Balance beam			34	13.900
2007	European Championships	Amsterdam	Floor exercise			40	13.325
2007	World Championships	Stuttgart	Team	8	164.525	4	238.000
2007	World Championships	Stuttgart	All-around	13	57.850	15	58.225
2007	World Championships	Stuttgart	Unevne bars			25	14.975
2007	World Championships	Stuttgart	Balance beam			12	15.400
2007	World Championships	Stuttgart	Floor exercise			31	14.125
2008	Olympic Games	Beijing	Team	4	180.625	3	244.400
2008	Olympic Games	Beijing	All-around			10	60.425
2008	Olympic Games	Beijing	Uneven bars			10	15.500
2008	Olympic Games	Beijing	Balance beam			36	14.625
2008	Olympic Games	Beijing	Floor exercise	5	15.025	6	15.150
2014	World Championships	Nanning	Team	3	171.462	3	228.135
2014	World Championships	Nanning	All-around			15	55.864
2014	World Championships	Nanning	Uneven bars			9	14.766
2014	World Championships	Nanning	Balance beam			33	13.566
2014	World Championships	Nanning	Floor exercise			60	13.066

== See also ==
- List of Olympic female gymnasts for Russia
