= 2013 Russian Cup =

Gymnastics competition in Russia

The 2013 Russian Cup was held in Penza, Russia from 17 August 2013 until 21 August 2013.

== Medal winners ==
Event	Gold	Silver	Bronze
Women
Team	Saint Petersburg; Tatiana Nabieva; Ekaterina Kramarenko; Lilia Akhaimova; Alla Sidorenko	Volga Federal District; Polina Fedorova; Anna Rodionova; Olga Bikmurzina; Kristina Sidorova	Central Federal District; Anna Pavlova; Marina Nekrasova; Yulia Inshina; Yulia Chemareva
All-Around	Tatiana Nabieva	Alla Sosnitskaya	Anna Pavlova
Vault	Tatiana Nabieva	Maria Paseka	Alla Sosnitskaya
Uneven Bars	Tatiana Nabieva	Maria Paseka	Alla Sosnitskaya
Balance Beam	Tatiana Nabieva	Anna Pavlova	Polina Fedorova
Floor Exercise	Alla Sosnitskaya	Olga Bikmurzina	Maria Paseka

== Team Result ==
Rank	Team	Vault (gymnastics)	Uneven bars	Balance beam	Floor (gymnastics)	Total
1st place, gold medalist(s)	Saint Petersburg	42.465 (1)	41.967 (1)	38.830 (2)	39.434 (1)	162.696
1st place, gold medalist(s)	Tatiana Nabieva	14.666	14.667	13.130	13.367	162.696
1st place, gold medalist(s)	Ekaterina Kramarenko	14.033	14.200	13.500	12.867	162.696
1st place, gold medalist(s)	Lilia Akhaimova	13.766		12.200	13.200	162.696
1st place, gold medalist(s)	Alla Sidorenko		13.100			162.696
2nd place, silver medalist(s)	Volga Federal District	40.699 (2)	39.159 (2)	40.320 (1)	39.434 (1)	159.612
2nd place, silver medalist(s)	Polina Fedorova	13.566	13.133	13.860	13.167	159.612
2nd place, silver medalist(s)	Anna Rodionova	13.733	12.566	14.000	12.767	159.612
2nd place, silver medalist(s)	Olga Bikmurzina	13.400	13.460	12.460	13.500	159.612
2nd place, silver medalist(s)	Kristina Sidorova					159.612
3rd place, bronze medalist(s)	Central Federal District	38.932 (3)	36.900 (3)	37.290 (3)	37.601 (3)	150.723
3rd place, bronze medalist(s)	Anna Pavlova	14.533	13.100	13.660	12.934	150.723
3rd place, bronze medalist(s)	Marina Nekrasova	13.033	11.067	11.630	12.267	150.723
3rd place, bronze medalist(s)	Yulia Inshina			12.000	12.400	150.723
3rd place, bronze medalist(s)	Yulia Chemareva	11.366	12.733			150.723
4	Moscow	13.400 (4)	23.567 (4)	26.160 (4)	25.967 (4)	89.094
4	Alla Sosnitskaya	13.400		13.400	12.867	89.094
4	Anastasia Marchuk		11.267	12.760	13.100	89.094
4	Maria Paseka		12.300			89.094
4	Anastasia Grishina					89.094

=== All-Around Result ===
Rank	Gymnast	Represent	Vault (gymnastics)	Uneven bars	Balance beam	Floor (gymnastics)	Total
1st place, gold medalist(s)	Tatiana Nabieva	Saint Petersburg	14.267	14.633	13.666	13.460	56.026
2nd place, silver medalist(s)	Alla Sosnitskaya	Moscow	14.334	14.200	13.100	14.300	55.934
3rd place, bronze medalist(s)	Anna Pavlova	Central Federal District	14.976	13.000	13.633	13.530	55.139
4	Anna Rodionova	Volga Federal District	14.100	13.600	14.533	12.860	55.093
5	Ekaterina Kramarenko	Saint Petersburg	13.667	14.300	14.400	11.460	53.827
6	Polina Fedorova	Volga Federal District	13.400	13.066	13.933	13.030	53.429
7	Olga Bikmurzina	Volga Federal District	13.400	11.833	12.833	13.200	51.266
8	Daria Elizarova	Central Federal District	13.800	12.200	12.166	12.900	51.066
9	Alla Sidorenko	Saint Petersburg	12.500	12.733	12.166	13.030	50.429
10	Lilia Akhaimova	Saint Petersburg	13.567	11.000	11.966	13.200	49.733
11	Yulia Inshina	Central Federal District	12.967	10.933	12.700	12.760	49.360
12	Marina Nekrasova	Central Federal District	12.300	12.100	12.333	12.600	49.333
13	Kristina Sidorova	Volga Federal District	13.100	10.466	12.633	12.330	48.529
14	Anastasia Marchuk	Moscow	12.934	11.033	13.600	10.960	48.527
15	Kristina Kruglikova	Central Federal District	13.667	11.866	12.066	10.566	48.165
16	Yulia Chemareva	Central Federal District	11.134	12.433	11.800	11.300	46.667
17	Irina Andreeva	Southern Federal District	13.067	9.133	11.533	12.060	45.793
18	Yana Popova	Volga Federal District	12.500	11.000	11.233	10.700	45.433
19	Elena Shcherbakova	Southern Federal District	12.600	10.700	11.166	10.800	45.266
20	Yulia Tipaeva	Central Federal District	13.267	8.333	11.267	12.140	45.007
21	Maria Paseka	Moscow	15.034	14.033		13.660	42.727
22	Anastasia Cheong	Saint Petersburg	13.134	9.333	12.566		35.033
23	Diana Ravdina	Saint Petersburg	11.567	0.000	12.133	10.830	34.530
24	Yuna Nefedova	Central Federal District	11.167		10.333	9.730	31.230

== Vault Result ==
Rank	Gymnast	Represent	Total
1st place, gold medalist(s)	Tatiana Nabieva	Saint Petersburg	14.512
2nd place, silver medalist(s)	Maria Paseka	Moscow	14.400
3rd place, bronze medalist(s)	Alla Sosnitskaya	Moscow	14.200
4	Lilia Akhaimova	Saint Petersburg	13.712
5	Marina Nekrasova	Central Federal District	12.862
6	Olga Bikmurzina	Volga Federal District	12.637
6	Kristina Kruglikova	Central Federal District	12.637
8	Anna Pavlova	Central Federal District	6.850

== Uneven Bars Result ==
Rank	Gymnast	Represent	Total
1st place, gold medalist(s)	Tatiana Nabieva	Saint Petersburg	14.750
2nd place, silver medalist(s)	Maria Paseka	Moscow	14.325
3rd place, bronze medalist(s)	Alla Sosnitskaya	Moscow	14.225
4	Ekaterina Kramarenko	Saint Petersburg	14.075
5	Polina Fedorova	Volga Federal District	13.275
6	Anna Rodionova	Volga Federal District	13.100
7	Alla Sidorenko	Saint Petersburg	12.975
8	Yulia Chemareva	Central Federal District	10.100

== Balance Beam Result ==
Rank	Gymnast	Represent	Total
1st place, gold medalist(s)	Tatiana Nabieva	Saint Petersburg	14.300
2nd place, silver medalist(s)	Anna Pavlova	Central Federal District	13.875
3rd place, bronze medalist(s)	Polina Fedorova	Volga Federal District	13.750
4	Anastasia Marchuk	Moscow	13.350
5	Alla Sosnitskaya	Moscow	12.775
6	Anna Rodionova	Volga Federal District	12.450
7	Olga Bikmurzina	Volga Federal District	12.075
8	Ekaterina Kramarenko	Saint Petersburg	11.775

== Floor Exercise Result ==
Rank	Gymnast	Represent	Total
1st place, gold medalist(s)	Alla Sosnitskaya	Moscow	13.925
2nd place, silver medalist(s)	Olga Bikmurzina	Volga Federal District	13.800
3rd place, bronze medalist(s)	Maria Paseka	Moscow	13.275
4	Anna Pavlova	Central Federal District	13.250
5	Polina Fedorova	Volga Federal District	13.200
6	Daria Elizarova	Central Federal District	13.025
7	Lilia Akhaimova	Saint Petersburg	12.475
8	Alla Sidorenko	Saint Petersburg	11.775
