= Viktoria Gorbatova =

Russian artistic gymnast (born 2002)

- Full name: Viktoria Andreevna Gorbatova
- Born: 19 June 2002 (age 24)

Gymnastics career
- Discipline: Women's artistic gymnastics
- Country represented: Russia
- Head coach: Irina Kolobova

Viktoria Andreevna Gorbatova (Russian: Виктория Андриивна Горбатова; born 19 June 2002) is a Russian former artistic gymnast.

== Gymnastics career ==
Gorbatova made her international debut at the 2014 Gym Festival Trnava and won a bronze medal in the team competition alongside Varvara Zubova, and she placed seventh in the all-around. At the 2015 International Gymnix, she won a team silver medal alongside Natalia Kapitonova, Angelina Simakova, and Anastasia Ilyankova. Individually, she finished fourth in the vault final. She won a gold medal with the Central Federal District team at the 2015 Russian Championships. At the 2015 Voronin Cup, she won a bronze medal on the vault.

At the 2016 Russian Championships, Gorbatova won a silver medal on the vault, behind Aleksandra Shchekoldina, and on the floor exercise, behind Zubova. She only competed on the uneven bars and balance beam at the 2017 Russian Junior Championships, winning silver and bronze, respectively.

Gorbatove became age-eligible for senior competitions beginning in 2018. She made her senior debut at the 2018 DTB Pokal Team Challenge, where the Russian team placed fifth due to multiple mistakes. At the 2018 Russian Championships, she won a team bronze medal with the Moscow second team, and she placed ninth in the all-around. In the event finals, she finished fifth on the uneven bars and sixth on the floor exercise. She then placed 11th in the all-around at the 2018 Russian Cup. At the 2018 Voronin Cup, she finished 19th in the all-around.

Gorbatova finished 37th in the all-around qualifications and did not advance into any individual finals at the 2019 Russian Championships, the final competition of her career.

== Competitive history ==
Year	Event	Team	AA	VT	UB	BB	FX
2010	Khorkina Cup (2nd Level)		2nd				
2014	National Championships (Youth)(1st Level)		7th	8th	6th	2nd	
2014	Gym Festival Trnava (Junior)	3rd	7th				
2014	Russian Hopes (1st Class)	4th	3rd	3rd		4th	2nd
2015	L'International Gymnix (Junior International Cup)	2nd		4th			
2015	National Championships (Junior) (CMS)	1st	4th	3rd		3rd	1st
