= 2014 Russian Artistic Gymnastics Championships =

Gymnastics competition in Russia

Russian Artistic Gymnastics Championships
- Location: Penza, Russia
- Date: April 3–13, 2014

The 2014 Russian Artistic Gymnastics Championships will be held in Penza, Russia from April 3 to April 6 for WAG and April 10 to April 13 for MAG.

== Medal winners ==
Event	Gold	Silver	Bronze
Senior
Team	Central Federal District - 1 Kristina Kruglikova; Maria Kharenkova; Viktoria Komova; Ksenia Afanasyeva; Daria Elizarova; Galina Gannochenko	Moscow; Aliya Mustafina; Alla Sosnitskaya; Daria Spiridonova; Anastasia Grishina; Maria Paseka	Saint Petersburg; Ekaterina Kramarenko; Lilia Akhaimova; Tatiana Nabieva; Anastasia Cheong; Alla Sidorenko; Maria Dunaeva
All-Around	Aliya Mustafina	Alla Sosnitskaya	Anastasia Grishina
Vault	Alla Sosnitskaya	Maria Paseka	Tatiana Nabieva
Uneven Bars	Daria Spiridonova	Anna Rodionova	Alla Sosnitskaya
Balance Beam	Maria Kharenkova	Daria Spiridonova	Aliya Mustafina
Floor Exercise	Polina Fedorova	Alla Sosnitskaya	Kristina Goryunova
Junior
Team	Central Federal District; Angelina Melnikova; Maria Bondareva; Margarita Varnakova; Ekaterina Sokova; Elena Likhodolskaya; Elena Oganesyan	Moscow - 1 Daria Mikhailova; Seda Tutkhalyan; Elizaveta Kochetkova; Viktoria Trykina; Viktoria Gazeeva; Olga Khamidullina	Volga Federal District; Ilsya Amenova; Daria Lopatina; Maria Pavlova; Anastasia Grekova; Anastasia Dmitrieva; Olga Balekzhanina
All-Around	MS:Angelina Melnikova; CMS:Elena Eremina	MS:Seda Tutkhalyan; CMS:Ekaterina Sokova	MS:Daria Mikhailova; CMS:Viktoria Trykina
Vault	MS:Seda Tutkhalyan; CMS:Elena Eremina	MS:Daria Mikhailova; CMS:Irina Mitreneva	MS:Anastasia Dmitrieva; CMS:Ekaterina Sokova
Uneven Bars	MS:Daria Skrypnik; CMS:Elena Eremina	MS:Seda Tutkhalyan; CMS:Ekaterina Sokova	MS:Polina Petukhova; CMS:Elena Likhodolskaya
Balance Beam	MS:Angelina Melnikova; CMS:Ekaterina Sokova	MS:Daria Mikhailova; CMS:Elena Oganesyan	MS:Anastasia Dmitrieva; CMS:Viktoria Muhortova
Floor Exercise	MS:Angelina Melnikova; CMS:Elena Likhodolskaya	MS:Anastasia Dmitrieva; CMS:Ekaterina Sokova	MS:Daria Mikhailova; CMS:Alyona Arkusha
Youth
All-Around	1st Level:Angelina Simakova; 2nd Level:Olga Astafyeva	1st Level:Ksenia Klimenko; 2nd Level:Arina Strukova	1st Level:Varvara Zubova; 2nd Level:Sofia Suvorova
Vault	1st Level:Angelina Simakova; 2nd Level:Maria Minayeva	1st Level:Taisia Borozdyko; 2nd Level:Arina Strukova	1st Level:Valeria Saifulina; 2nd Level:Elizaveta Sokolova
Uneven Bars	1st Level:Angelina Simakova; 2nd Level:Ksenia Cheban	1st Level:Valeria Saifulina; 2nd Level:Yulia Grigoryeva	1st Level:Ksenia Klimenko; 2nd Level:Elizaveta Sokolova
Balance Beam	1st Level:Anastasia Shinkarenko; 2nd Level:Irina Komnova	1st Level:Viktoria Gorbatova; 2nd Level:Arina Strukova	1st Level:Ksenia Klimenko; 2nd Level:Olga Astafyeva
Floor Exercise	1st Level:Varvara Zubova; 2nd Level:Olga Astafyeva	1st Level:Taisia Borozdyko; 2nd Level:Arina Strukova	1st Level:Angelina Simakova; 2nd Level:Rukhshona Azamova

== Schedule of events ==
- Wednesday, April 2
  - 12:00 – 13:50 Jr. Team Final (Subdivision 1)
  - 14:00 – 15:50 Jr. Team Final (Subdivision 2)
- Thursday, April 3
  - 12:00 – 13:50 Sr. All-Around Final (Subdivision 1)
  - 14:00 – 15:50 Sr. All-Around Final (Subdivision 2)
- Friday, April 4
  - 11:00 – 12:30 Jr. All-Around Final(CMS)
  - 12:45 – 14:15 Jr. All-Around Final(MS)
- Saturday, April 5
  - 11:00 – 12:30 Sr. Team Final
- Sunday, April 6
  - 11:00 – Event Final

== Start List ==
Event	Vault (gymnastics)	Uneven bars	Balance beam	Floor (gymnastics)	Bye
Jr. Team Final (Subdivision 1)	Northwestern Federal District	Siberian Federal District	Southern Federal District	Moscow 1	Volga Federal District
Jr. Team Final (Subdivision 2)	Ural Federal District	Central Federal District	Far Eastern Federal District	Saint Petersburg	Moscow 2
Sr. All-Around Final (Subdivision 1)	Southern Federal District	Northwestern Federal District	Central Federal District 1	Central Federal District 2	Siberian Federal District
Sr. All-Around Final (Subdivision 2)	Volga Federal District	Ural Federal District	Moscow	Far Eastern Federal District	Saint Petersburg

== Results ==
=== Senior Team Final ===
Rank	Team	Vault (gymnastics)	Uneven bars	Balance beam	Floor (gymnastics)	Total
1st place, gold medalist(s)	Central Federal District	42.767	41.633	40.967	40.433	165.800
1st place, gold medalist(s)	Kristina Kruglikova	14.233	12.000	12.067	13.533	165.800
1st place, gold medalist(s)	Maria Kharenkova		14.300	15.600		165.800
1st place, gold medalist(s)	Viktoria Komova	14.467	15.333			165.800
1st place, gold medalist(s)	Ksenia Afanasyeva	14.067			13.400	165.800
1st place, gold medalist(s)	Daria Elizarova			13.300	13.500	165.800
1st place, gold medalist(s)	Galina Gannochenko					165.800
2nd place, silver medalist(s)	Moscow	44.700	45.133	44.100	31.337	165.270
2nd place, silver medalist(s)	Aliya Mustafina	15.067	15.033	15.333	13.700	165.270
2nd place, silver medalist(s)	Alla Sosnitskaya	14.800			14.437	165.270
2nd place, silver medalist(s)	Daria Spiridonova		14.767	14.167		165.270
2nd place, silver medalist(s)	Anastasia Grishina			14.600	3.200	165.270
2nd place, silver medalist(s)	Viktoria Komova *		15.333			165.270
2nd place, silver medalist(s)	Maria Paseka	14.833				165.270
3rd place, bronze medalist(s)	Saint Petersburg	41.767	39.933	40.066	41.067	162.833
3rd place, bronze medalist(s)	Ekaterina Kramarenko	13.867	13.167	13.233	13.267	162.833
3rd place, bronze medalist(s)	Lilia Akhaimova	13.767		13.700	13.800	162.833
3rd place, bronze medalist(s)	Tatiana Nabieva	14.133	13.933	13.133		162.833
3rd place, bronze medalist(s)	Anastasia Cheong				13.800	162.833
3rd place, bronze medalist(s)	Alla Sidorenko		12.833			162.833
3rd place, bronze medalist(s)	Maria Dunaeva					162.833
4	Volga Federal District	40.366	40.901	38.366	39.267	158.900
4	Polina Fedorova	13.833	13.267	14.433	14.200	158.900
4	Olga Bikmurzina	13.633		12.333	12.600	158.900
4	Irina Yashina	12.900			12.467	158.900
4	Anna Rodionova		14.367			158.900
4	Ksenia Kolokolneva		13.267			158.900
4	Anastasia Kadysheva			11.600		158.900
5	Southern Federal District	39.267	36.900	40.834	38.467	155.468
5	Valeria Golenisheva	12.500	12.167	12.267	12.667	155.468
5	Anastasia Osetrova	13.800	10.433	12.967		155.468
5	Maria Kharenkova *		14.300	15.600		155.468
5	Alina Martynova	12.967			13.700	155.468
5	Natalia Medvedeva				12.100	155.468
5	Elena Sherbakova					155.468
6	Siberian Federal District	39.767	34.400	36.133	38.267	148.567
6	Margarita Artemova	13.267		12.600	12.567	148.567
6	Maria Nechaeva		11.067	12.100	13.133	148.567
6	Ekaterina Shtronda		12.300	11.433	12.567	148.567
6	Marina Shashmurina	13.500	11.033			148.567
6	Alyona Nedovba	13.000				148.567
7	Central Federal District - 2	39.701	28.467	36.134	37.166	141.468
7	Kristina Kiseler	13.267	10.200		12.833	141.468
7	Milana Maximova	12.667	9.200	12.400		141.468
7	Anastasia Dulova		9.067	12.167	12.300	141.468
7	Yulia Bulatova			11.567	12.033	141.468
7	Yana Sakha	13.767				141.468
7	Yulia Chemareva					141.468
8	Urals Federal District	38.100	20.600	32.500	35.733	126.933
8	Anastasia Davydova	12.333	6.600	10.733	12.000	126.933
8	Yulia Sedova	13.067	6.900	9.567	11.833	126.933
8	Alisa Masloboeva	12.700			11.900	126.933
8	Anna Solomeina		7.100	12.200		126.933
8	Anastasia Darenskikh					126.933

=== Senior All-Around ===
Senior Team members Viktoria Kuzmina and Evgenia Shelgunova didn't attend. Senior Reserve members Evgenia Zhukova, Evgenia Korolkova, Kristina Levshina and Anastasia Marchuk didn't attend.

Rank	Gymnast	Team	Vault (gymnastics)	Uneven bars	Balance beam	Floor (gymnastics)	Total
1st place, gold medalist(s)	Aliya Mustafina	Moscow	14.733	14.333	15.400	15.100	59.566
2nd place, silver medalist(s)	Alla Sosnitskaya	Moscow	14.700	14.467	14.067	14.833	58.067
3rd place, bronze medalist(s)	Anastasia Grishina	Moscow	13.867	13.900	14.400	14.300	56.467
4	Ekaterina Kramarenko	Saint Petersburg	13.900	14.533	13.167	14.067	55.667
5	Daria Spiridonova	Moscow	13.600	15.133	13.733	13.200	55.666
6	Polina Fedorova	Volga Federal District	13.700	13.333	14.500	13.600	55.133
7	Tatiana Nabieva	Saint Petersburg	14.567	13.933	13.400	12.700	54.600
8	Daria Elizarova	Central Federal District	13.700	13.833	13.800	12.300	53.633
9	Lilia Akhaimova	Saint Petersburg	13.667	11.700	13.167	13.933	52.467
10	Kristina Kruglikova	Central Federal District	13.667	12.033	13.233	13.533	52.466
11	Kristina Goryunova	Northwestern Federal District	13.500	11.833	13.167	13.900	52.400
12	Alexandra Yazydzhyan	Moscow	13.800	12.667	12.600	13.000	52.067
13	Alla Sidorenko	Saint Petersburg	13.500	13.100	12.300	13.033	51.933
14	Anastasia Cheong	Saint Petersburg	13.800	11.833	13.067	13.033	51.733
15	Ekaterina Mikhalkina	Volga Federal District	14.067	11.833	13.200	12.600	51.700
16	Alina Martynova	Southern Federal District	13.400	11.400	12.233	13.367	50.400
17	Valeria Golenisheva	Southern Federal District	13.233	11.533	11.800	12.733	49.299
18	Anastasia Osetrova	Southern Federal District	13.567	11.267	12.767	11.633	49.234
19	Ekaterina Shtronda	Siberian Federal District	12.900	11.267	11.767	13.100	49.034
20	Irina Yashina	Volga Federal District	13.133	10.867	11.800	13.067	48.867
21	Yulia Ovcharova	Far Eastern Federal District	13.233	11.100	11.967	12.333	48.633
22	Marina Shashmurina	Siberian Federal District	13.267	11.300	11.167	12.600	48.334
23	Maria Nechaeva	Siberian Federal District	12.700	12.067	11.400	12.133	48.300
24	Anastasia Dulova	Central Federal District - 2	12.733	11.667	11.500	12.400	48.300
25	Olga Bikmurzina	Volga Federal District	13.700	10.900	11.000	12.600	48.200
26	Anna Solomeina	Urals Federal District	12.867	10.787	11.833	12.333	47.800
27	Ksenia Kolokolneva	Volga Federal District	12.667	12.300	11.000	11.800	47.767
28	Margarita Artemova	Siberian Federal District	12.767	10.467	11.767	12.700	47.701
29	Eleonora Goryunova	Northwestern Federal District	13.487	9.400	11.900	12.533	47.300
30	Arina Nedovesova	Far Eastern Federal District	12.867	8.900	12.467	12.967	47.201
31	Elena Sherbakova	Southern Federal District	12.100	11.900	11.733	11.433	47.166
32	Alyona Nedovba	Siberian Federal District	12.733	10.233	12.133	11.933	47.032
33	Milana Maximova	Central Federal District - 2	12.767	9.800	11.667	12.233	46.467
34	Valentina Lukovnikova	Central Federal District	13.100	9.467	12.433	11.433	46.433
35	Anastasia Kadysheva	Volga Federal District	12.267	9.733	13.133	11.100	46.233
36	Natalia Medvedeva	Southern Federal District	13.100	9.967	11.200	11.867	46.134
37	Galina Gannochenko	Central Federal District	12.800	9.800	11.833	11.700	46.133
38	Anna Vanyushkina	Northwestern Federal District	13.400	8.600	11.200	12.800	46.000
39	Alina Oshatinskaya	Southern Federal District	13.167	9.567	11.167	11.467	45.368
40	Kristina Kiseler	Central Federal District - 2	13.067	8.933	11.067	11.967	45.034
41	Anastasia Kutergina	Central Federal District	12.933	10.300	9.667	11.900	44.800
42	Yulia Sedova	Urals Federal District	13.033	9.033	10.000	11.833	43.899
43	Yana Sakha	Central Federal District - 2	13.333	7.900	10.533	11.567	43.333
44	Yulia Bulatova	Central Federal District - 2	12.567	6.467	11.067	12.533	42.634
45	Tatiana Ryzhova	Volga Federal District	12.400	7.333	11.333	11.400	42.466
46	Alisa Masloboeva	Urals Federal District	12.900	8.333	9.467	10.800	41.500
47	Viktoria Komova	Central Federal District	14.267	14.900	11.600	-	40.767
48	Anastasia Davydova	Urals Federal District	12.700	4.133	11.067	12.233	40.133
49	Anastasia Darenskikh	Urals Federal District	12.433	6.767	9.467	10.667	39.334
50	Anna Rodionova	Volga Federal District	13.800	15.067	-	-	28.867
51	Maria Paseka	Moscow	15.033	13.433	-	-	28.466
52	Maria Kharenkova	Southern Federal District	-	14.433	13.967	-	28.400
53	Ksenia Afanasyeva	Central Federal District	14.933	-	-	13.000	27.933
54	Maria Dunaeva	Saint Petersburg	-	-	10.567	11.300	21.867
55	Yulia Chemareva	Central Federal District - 2	-	12.567	-	-	12.567
56	Maria Napalkova	Central Federal District - 2	-	-	-	12.100	12.100

=== Senior Vault Final ===
Rank	Gymnast	Represent	Total
1st place, gold medalist(s)	Alla Sosnitskaya	Moscow	14.500
2nd place, silver medalist(s)	Maria Paseka	Moscow	14.384
3rd place, bronze medalist(s)	Tatiana Nabieva	Saint Petersburg	13.876
4	Lilia Akhaimova	Saint Petersburg	13.600
5	Anastasia Osetrova	Southern Federal District	13.500
6	Anastasia Cheong	Saint Petersburg	13.467
6	Ekaterina Mikhalkina	Volga Federal District	13.467
8	Olga Bikmurzina	Volga Federal District	13.183

=== Senior Uneven Bars Final ===
Rank	Gymnast	Represent	Total
1st place, gold medalist(s)	Daria Spiridonova	Moscow	14.733
2nd place, silver medalist(s)	Anna Rodionova	Volga Federal District	14.467
3rd place, bronze medalist(s)	Alla Sosnitskaya	Moscow	14.200
4	Ekaterina Kramarenko	Saint Petersburg	14.133
5	Maria Kharenkova	Southern Federal District	13.767
6	Aliya Mustafina	Moscow	13.667
7	Tatiana Nabieva	Saint Petersburg	13.267
8	Viktoria Komova	Central Federal District	11.467

=== Senior Balance Beam Final ===
Rank	Gymnast	Represent	Total
1st place, gold medalist(s)	Maria Kharenkova	Southern Federal District	15.300
2nd place, silver medalist(s)	Daria Spiridonova	Moscow	14.400
3rd place, bronze medalist(s)	Aliya Mustafina	Moscow	14.100
4	Polina Fedorova	Volga Federal District	14.067
5	Alla Sosnitskaya	Moscow	13.900
6	Kristina Goryunova	Northwestern Federal District	13.167
7	Kristina Kruglikova	Central Federal District	12.833
8	Daria Elizarova	Central Federal District	12.733

=== Senior Floor Exercise Final ===
Rank	Gymnast	Represent	Total
1st place, gold medalist(s)	Polina Fedorova	Volga Federal District	14.133
2nd place, silver medalist(s)	Alla Sosnitskaya	Moscow	14.033
3rd place, bronze medalist(s)	Kristina Goryunova	Northwestern Federal District	13.900
4	Lilia Akhaimova	Saint Petersburg	13.700
5	Alina Martynova	Southern Federal District	13.233
6	Ekaterina Kramarenko	Saint Petersburg	13.133
7	Daria Spiridonova	Moscow	13.100
8	Kristina Kruglikova	Central Federal District	13.067

=== Junior Team Final ===
Junior Team members Anastasia Ilyankova, Natalia Kapitonova and Alena Chernova didn't attend. Junior Reserve members Raisa Batyrova, Viktoria Bykova and Maria Iontef didn't attend.

Rank	Team	Vault (gymnastics)	Uneven bars	Balance beam	Floor (gymnastics)	Total
1st place, gold medalist(s)	Central Federal District	65.434	64.766	69.733	68.033	267.966
1st place, gold medalist(s)	Angelina Melnikova	14.167	14.800	15.233	14.567	267.966
1st place, gold medalist(s)	Ekaterina Sokova	13.667	14.100	13.700	13.033	267.966
1st place, gold medalist(s)	Maria Bondareva	13.833	12.500	14.033	14.033	267.966
1st place, gold medalist(s)	Elena Oganesyan	11.467	11.033	13.600	12.267	267.966
1st place, gold medalist(s)	Margarita Varnakova	12.300	9.000	13.167	12.167	267.966
1st place, gold medalist(s)	Elena Likhodolskaya		12.333	12.567	14.133	267.966
2nd place, silver medalist(s)	Moscow - 1	67.700	62.466	67.767	65.601	263.534
2nd place, silver medalist(s)	Seda Tutkhalyan	14.733	14.533	14.567	14.167	263.534
2nd place, silver medalist(s)	Daria Mikhailova	13.900	12.900	13.733	14.100	263.534
2nd place, silver medalist(s)	Elizaveta Kochetkova	13.633	11.800	13.767	12.967	263.534
2nd place, silver medalist(s)	Viktoria Trykina	12.767	11.633	12.600	13.000	263.534
2nd place, silver medalist(s)	Olga Khamidullina	12.667	9.167	12.967	11.367	263.534
2nd place, silver medalist(s)	Viktoria Gazeeva		11.600	12.733	10.634	263.534
3rd place, bronze medalist(s)	Volga Federal District	67.567	59.633	64.500	64.867	256.567
3rd place, bronze medalist(s)	Anastasia Dmitrieva	14.167	13.267	13.667	14.267	256.567
3rd place, bronze medalist(s)	Ilsia Aminova	13.667	12.667	12.200	13.367	256.567
3rd place, bronze medalist(s)	Olga Valekzhanina	13.333	12.833	11.667	12.767	256.567
3rd place, bronze medalist(s)	Daria Lopatina	13.833	11.333	12.933	11.733	256.567
3rd place, bronze medalist(s)	Anastasia Grekova	12.567	9.533	13.100	10.800	256.567
3rd place, bronze medalist(s)	Maria Pavlova	11.900	7.767	12.600	12.733	256.567
4	Saint Petersburg	65.533	60.134	61.200	64.399	251.266
4	Elena Eremina	14.100	14.033	12.267	14.000	251.266
4	Polina Petukhova	13.033	12.800	13.000	12.533	251.266
4	Aleksandra Sadkova	12.533	11.567	12.233	12.900	251.266
4	Varvara Batalova	12.767	11.967	11.400	13.033	251.266
4	Diana Dogmarova	13.100	9.767	11.100	11.933	251.266
4	Ekaterina Boeva	11.700	8.733	12.300	11.867	251.266
5	Siberian Federal District	65.867	57.766	61.566	65.233	250.432
5	Polina Spirina	13.567	11.633	12.900	13.233	250.432
5	Yulia Biryulya	13.767	11.100	12.200	13.667	250.432
5	Irina Mitreneva	13.467	12.500	11.333	12.700	250.432
5	Alyona Arkusha	12.533	11.733	12.333	13.400	250.432
5	Yulia Bashurova	12.533	10.400	12.800	11.900	250.432
5	Alexandra Shapovalova	12.500	10.800	10.333	12.233	250.432
6	Southern Federal District	65.233	60.866	61.235	58.799	246.133
6	Ksenia Molozhavenko	13.633	13.133	12.333	10.833	246.133
6	Maria Vaselenok	13.133	11.133	12.034	12.433	246.133
6	Viktoria Korikova	12.867	11.367	11.200	11.833	246.133
6	Yulia Minina	12.667	9.533	12.134	12.233	246.133
6	Diana Verevkina	12.933	10.733	9.067	11.467	246.133
6	Daria Skrypnik		14.500	13.534		246.133
7	Ural Federal District	64.200	58.700	60.700	60.944	244.544
7	Elena Alexenko	12.833	11.833	12.333	13.500	244.544
7	Inga Galeeva	13.467	11.767	12.467	11.877	244.544
7	Polina Borzykh	11.633	12.667	12.067	12.300	244.544
7	Alisa Spasova	12.667	11.533	11.733	10.867	244.544
7	Marina Muhortova	12.033	10.900	11.267	12.400	244.544
7	Anastasia Baiguzhina	13.200	8.533	12.100	10.667	244.544
8	Northwestern Federal District	64.667	54.100	57.067	61.134	236.968
8	Elizaveta Osina	13.200	11.200	11.467	12.967	236.968
8	Daria Savatkina	13.033	10.733	11.700	12.300	236.968
8	Elizaveta Eremina	13.067	11.333	11.767	10.833	236.968
8	Ulyana Borovykh	12.267	10.167	11.800	12.567	236.968
8	Vasilisa Tsupina	13.100	10.667	10.333	12.467	236.968
9	Moscow - 2	25.533	20.500	22.633	24.333	92.999
9	Anastasia Kuznetsova	12.733	9.900	11.333	12.833	92.999
9	Anastasia Fadeeva	12.800	10.600	11.300	11.500	92.999

=== Junior All-Around (MS) ===
Rank	Gymnast	Team	Vault (gymnastics)	Uneven bars	Balance beam	Floor (gymnastics)	Total
1st place, gold medalist(s)	Angelina Melnikova	Central Federal District	14.733	14.600	15.067	13.900	58.300
2nd place, silver medalist(s)	Seda Tutkhalyan	Moscow	14.633	14.167	14.733	13.000	56.533
3rd place, bronze medalist(s)	Daria Mikhailova	Moscow	13.833	11.933	13.667	14.100	53.533
4	Yulia Biryulya	Siberian Federal District	13.800	13.200	13.133	13.067	53.200
5	Anastasia Dmitrieva	Volga Federal District	14.067	12.600	12.533	13.900	53.100
6	Polina Spirina	Siberian Federal District	13.333	12.533	13.333	13.367	52.566
7	Ksenia Molozhavenko	Urals Federal District	13.600	12.267	13.367	12.300	51.534
8	Olga Valekzhanina	Volga Federal District	13.300	12.267	12.400	13.300	51.267
9	Daria Lopatina	Volga Federal District	13.800	10.767	12.867	13.033	50.467
10	Polina Petukhova	Saint Petersburg	13.000	12.433	12.167	12.467	50.067
11	Alexandra Sadkova	Saint Petersburg	12.267	11.900	13.067	12.400	49.634
12	Elena Alexenko	Southern Federal District	13.133	10.200	12.767	12.933	49.033
13	Inga Galeyeva	Southern Federal District	13.533	10.733	11.433	12.933	48.632
14	Ekaterina Tyunina	Central Federal District	12.767	11.100	11.600	12.967	48.434
15	Margarita Varnakova	Central Federal District	13.333	10.900	11.933	12.133	48.299
16	Ilina Kaigulova	Volga Federal District	13.000	10.200	11.367	13.200	47.767
17	Marina Mukhortova	Southern Federal District	12.033	12.200	11.233	12.200	47.666
18	Alina Bunina	Central Federal District	13.333	9.933	11.233	12.200	46.699
19	Ekaterina Tishkova	Central Federal District	12.400	9.300	11.800	12.833	46.333
20	Anastasia Kuznetsova	Moscow - 2	12.267	8.700	11.933	12.633	45.533
21	Alexandra Shapovalova	Siberian Federal District	12.400	10.333	10.667	12.100	45.500
22	Ksenia Ivanova	Central Federal District	13.100	10.500	10.200	11.567	45.367
23	Daria Savatkina	Northwestern Federal District	12.900	8.900	11.033	11.967	44.800
24	Vasilisa Tsupina	Northwestern Federal District	13.133	9.700	9.533	12.267	44.633

=== Junior All-Around (CMS) ===
Rank	Gymnast	Team	Vault (gymnastics)	Uneven bars	Balance beam	Floor (gymnastics)	Total
1st place, gold medalist(s)	Elena Eremina	Saint Petersburg	14.067	13.900	13.133	14.000	55.100
2nd place, silver medalist(s)	Ekaterina Sokova	Central Federal District	13.867	13.900	13.533	13.433	54.733
3rd place, bronze medalist(s)	Viktoria Trykina	Moscow	13.333	11.533	13.933	12.600	51.399
4	Elena Likhodolskaya	Central Federal District	13.300	11.233	12.900	13.733	51.166
5	Polina Borzykh	Southern Federal District	13.067	11.633	13.433	13.000	51.133
6	Elizaveta Kochetkova	Moscow	13.433	12.400	12.367	12.833	51.033
7	Irina Mitreneva	Siberian Federal District	13.333	12.333	11.667	12.700	50.033
8	Viktoria Mukhortova	Volga Federal District	13.600	11.600	12.067	12.467	49.734
9	Elena Oganesyan	Central Federal District	12.100	12.000	13.233	12.000	49.333
10	Elizaveta Osina	Northwestern Federal District	13.033	10.633	11.967	12.300	47.933
11	Varvara Batalova	Saint Petersburg	12.500	9.800	12.367	13.167	47.834
12	Alyona Arkusha	Siberian Federal District	13.133	10.200	11.600	12.700	47.633
13	Anastasia Frolova	Volga Federal District	12.800	10.733	11.300	12.733	47.566
14	Yulia Bashurova	Siberian Federal District	12.433	10.133	12.467	12.467	47.500
15	Viktoria Korikova	Ural Federal District	12.733	11.200	10.667	12.667	47.267
16	Ksenia Sabaldash	Volga Federal District	12.967	9.200	11.933	12.600	46.700
17	Ilsia Aminova	Volga Federal District	13.577	11.200	9.067	12.833	46.677
18	Maria Vaselenok	Ural Federal District	12.933	11.200	11.067	11.200	46.400
19	Ekaterina Polikarpova	Central Federal District	13.000	10.933	9.933	12.233	46.099
20	Elizaveta Eremina	Northwestern Federal District	12.700	10.867	9.733	12.533	45.833
21	Diana Dogmarova	Saint Petersburg	12.667	9.333	9.933	12.000	43.933
22	Ulyana Borovykh	Northwestern Federal District	12.367	7.367	12.067	12.100	43.901
23	Anastasia Fadeyeva	Moscow - 2	12.267	9.700	10.233	10.800	43.000
24	Alisa Spasova	Southern Federal District	11.767	8.400	11.000	10.600	41.767
25	Anastasia Grekova	Volga Federal District	12.067	6.367	11.000	9.300	38.734

=== Junior Vault Final (MC) ===
Rank	Gymnast	Represent	Total
1st place, gold medalist(s)	Seda Tutkhalyan	Moscow	14.417
2nd place, silver medalist(s)	Daria Mikhailova	Moscow	13.817
3rd place, bronze medalist(s)	Anastasia Dmitrieva	Volga Federal District	13.717
4	Polina Spirina	Siberian Federal District	13.484
5	Ksenia Molozhavenko	Urals Federal District	13.400
6	Daria Lopatina	Volga Federal District	13.084
7	Evgenia Menovschikova	Southern Federal District	12.967
8	Ksenia Ivanova	Central Federal District	12.750

=== Junior Uneven Bars Final (MC) ===
Rank	Gymnast	Represent	Total
1st place, gold medalist(s)	Daria Skrypnik	Southern Federal District	14.600
2nd place, silver medalist(s)	Seda Tutkhalyan	Moscow	14.333
3rd place, bronze medalist(s)	Polina Petukhova	Saint Petersburg	12.567
4	Daria Mikhailova	Moscow	12.400
5	Ksenia Molozhavenko	Urals Federal District	11.033
6	Olga Valekzhanina	Volga Federal District	10.967
7	Angelina Melnikova	Central Federal District	10.633
8	Anastasia Dmitrieva	Volga Federal District	9.833

=== Junior Balance Beam Final (MC) ===
Rank	Gymnast	Represent	Total
1st place, gold medalist(s)	Angelina Melnikova	Central Federal District	14.700
2nd place, silver medalist(s)	Daria Mikhailova	Moscow	14.433
3rd place, bronze medalist(s)	Anastasia Dmitrieva	Volga Federal District	14.367
4	Daria Skrypnik	Southern Federal District	14.200
5	Seda Tutkhalyan	Moscow	13.533
6	Ekaterina Tyunina	Central Federal District	12.567
7	Polina Petukhova	Saint Petersburg	11.700
8	Margarita Varnakova	Central Federal District	11.267

=== Junior Floor Exercise Final (MC) ===
Rank	Gymnast	Represent	Total
1st place, gold medalist(s)	Angelina Melnikova	Central Federal District	14.167
2nd place, silver medalist(s)	Anastasia Dmitrieva	Volga Federal District	13.933
3rd place, bronze medalist(s)	Daria Mikhailova	Moscow	13.467
4	Elena Alexenko	Urals Federal District	12.933
4	Ilina Kaigulova	Volga Federal District	12.933
6	Seda Tutkhalyan	Moscow	12.033
7	Polina Spirina	Siberian Federal District	12.000
8	Yulia Biryulya	Siberian Federal District	11.233

=== Junior Vault Final (KMC) ===
Rank	Gymnast	Represent	Total
1st place, gold medalist(s)	Elena Eremina	Saint Petersburg	13.950
2nd place, silver medalist(s)	Irina Mitreneva	Siberian Federal District	13.884
3rd place, bronze medalist(s)	Ekaterina Sokova	Central Federal District	13.500
4	Elizaveta Kochetkova	Moscow	13.367
5	Viktoria Muhortova	Volga Federal District	13.334
5	Ilsia Aminova	Volga Federal District	13.334
7	Ekaterina Polikarpova	Central Federal District	12.750
8	Elizaveta Osina	Northwestern Federal District	12.167

=== Junior Uneven Bars Final (KMC) ===
Rank	Gymnast	Represent	Total
1st place, gold medalist(s)	Elena Eremina	Saint Petersburg	13.867
2nd place, silver medalist(s)	Ekaterina Sokova	Central Federal District	13.167
3rd place, bronze medalist(s)	Elena Likhodolskaya	Central Federal District	12.567
4	Ilsia Aminova	Volga Federal District	12.433
4	Polina Borzykh	Ural Federal District	12.433
6	Irina Mitreneva	Siberian Federal District	11.933
7	Varvara Batalova	Saint Petersburg	11.267
8	Elizaveta Kochetkova	Moscow	10.933

=== Junior Balance Beam Final (KMC) ===
Rank	Gymnast	Represent	Total
1st place, gold medalist(s)	Ekaterina Sokova	Central Federal District	13.400
2nd place, silver medalist(s)	Elena Oganesyan	Central Federal District	13.167
3rd place, bronze medalist(s)	Viktoria Muhortova	Volga Federal District	12.567
4	Yulia Bashurova	Siberian Federal District	12.200
5	Viktoria Gazeeva	Moscow	11.400
6	Ksenia Sabaldash	Volga Federal District	11.233
7	Anastasia Grekova	Volga Federal District	11.200
8	Elizaveta Kochetkova	Moscow	11.167

=== Junior Floor Exercise Final (KMC) ===
Rank	Gymnast	Represent	Total
1st place, gold medalist(s)	Elena Likhodolskaya	Central Federal District	13.700
2nd place, silver medalist(s)	Ekaterina Sokova	Central Federal District	13.200
3rd place, bronze medalist(s)	Alyona Arkusha	Siberian Federal District	12.867
4	Ilsia Aminova	Volga Federal District	12.800
5	Varvara Batalova	Saint Petersburg	12.733
6	Elizaveta Kochetkova	Moscow	12.533
7	Elizaveta Osina	Northwestern Federal District	12.367
8	Viktoria Trykina	Moscow	11.667

=== Youth All-Around Final (1st Level) ===
Rank	Gymnast	Compulsories	Vault (gymnastics)	Uneven bars	Balance beam	Floor (gymnastics)	Total
1st place, gold medalist(s)	Angelina Simakova	37.287	14.350	13.450	12.050	13.375	90.512
2nd place, silver medalist(s)	Ksenia Klimenko	36.262	13.075	12.700	14.250	12.650	88.937
3rd place, bronze medalist(s)	Varvara Zubova	36.725	12.750	11.200	14.100	13.300	88.075
4	Anastasia Shinkarenko	35.687	13.375	12.300	13.300	13.125	87.787
5	Valeria Saifulina	36.425	13.650	13.050	13.150	11.375	87.650
6	Tatiana Krutikova	36.400	13.050	12.225	13.000	12.825	87.500
7	Viktoria Gorbatova	36.575	13.550	11.850	13.200	12.275	87.450
8	Anastasia Agafonova	35.525	13.300	12.400	12.850	13.175	87.250
9	Taisia Borozdyko	35.450	12.925	11.625	12.800	12.800	85.600
10	Evgeniya Baskova	35.687	13.425	12.050	11.300	12.550	85.012

=== Youth All-Around Final (2nd Level) ===
Rank	Gymnast	Compulsories	Vault (gymnastics)	Uneven bars	Balance beam	Floor (gymnastics)	Total
1st place, gold medalist(s)	Olga Astafyeva	37.725	12.700	11.425	11.800	11.450	85.100
2nd place, silver medalist(s)	Arina Strukova	38.350	13.275	9.500	10.850	11.225	83.200
3rd place, bronze medalist(s)	Sofia Suvorova	36.925	13.150	10.750	11.325	9.925	82.075
4	Elizaveta Sokolova	36.925	12.975	10.425	11.850	9.775	81.950
5	Yulia Grigoryeva	36.325	13.175	11.075	10.900	10.350	81.825
6	Irina Komnova	36.925	12.375	10.575	10.950	10.125	80.950
7	Maria Beletskaya	36.225	12.500	10.725	11.350	9.875	80.675
8	Polina Golubovskaya	36.200	12.825	10.200	10.875	10.175	80.275
9	Vladislava Urazova	36.950	12.750	9.575	10.250	10.550	80.075
10	Melek Sah	36.425	12.900	10.300	10.150	9.850	79.625

=== Youth Vault Final (1st Level) ===
Rank	Gymnast	Total
1st place, gold medalist(s)	Angelina Simakova	14.075
2nd place, silver medalist(s)	Taisia Borozdyko	13.525
3rd place, bronze medalist(s)	Valeria Saifulina	13.400
4	Anastasia Shinkarenko	13.325
5	Evgeniya Baskova	13.250
6	Alexandra Schekoldina	13.100
7	Anna Subbotina	12.050
8	Viktoria Gorbatova	11.713

=== Youth Uneven Bars Final (1st Level) ===
Rank	Gymnast	Total
1st place, gold medalist(s)	Angelina Simakova	13.000
2nd place, silver medalist(s)	Valeria Saifulina	12.825
3rd place, bronze medalist(s)	Ksenia Klimenko	12.675
4	Tatiana Krutikova	11.900
5	Anastasia Agafonova	11.875
6	Viktoria Gorbatova	11.850
7	Anastasia Shinkarenko	11.150
8	Evgeniya Baskova	11.075

=== Youth Balance Beam Final (1st Level) ===
Rank	Gymnast	Total
1st place, gold medalist(s)	Anastasia Shinkarenko	12.975
2nd place, silver medalist(s)	Viktoria Gorbatova	12.925
3rd place, bronze medalist(s)	Ksenia Klimenko	12.825
4	Zarina Daukayeva	12.550
5	Varvara Zubova	11.975
6	Anastasia Agafonova	11.625
7	Tatiana Krutikova	10.925
8	Tamara Konovalova	9.900

=== Youth Floor Exercise Final (1st Level) ===
Rank	Gymnast	Total
1st place, gold medalist(s)	Varvara Zubova	13.000
2nd place, silver medalist(s)	Taisia Borozdyko	12.975
3rd place, bronze medalist(s)	Angelina Simakova	12.925
4	Ksenia Klimenko	12.800
5	Anna Subbotina	12.700
6	Anastasia Shinkarenko	12.500
7	Alexander Kalkutina	12.325
8	Tatiana Krutikova	11.250

=== Youth Vault Final (2nd Level) ===
Rank	Gymnast	Total
1st place, gold medalist(s)	Maria Minayeva	13.250
2nd place, silver medalist(s)	Arina Strukova	13.250
3rd place, bronze medalist(s)	Elizaveta Sokolova	13.138
4	Rukhshona Azamova	13.125
5	Anna Rumyantseva	12.925
6	Alena Kochurova	12.863
7	Yulia Grigoryeva	12.775
8	Daria Vershinina	12.525

=== Youth Uneven Bars Final (2nd Level) ===
Rank	Gymnast	Total
1st place, gold medalist(s)	Ksenia Cheban	10.500
2nd place, silver medalist(s)	Yulia Grigoryeva	10.475
3rd place, bronze medalist(s)	Elizaveta Sokolova	10.225
4	Maria Beletskaya	9.700
5	Olga Astafyeva	9.575
6	Irina Komnova	9.475
7	Melek Sah	9.300
8	Sofia Suvorova	9.275

=== Youth Balance Beam Final (2nd Level) ===
Rank	Gymnast	Total
1st place, gold medalist(s)	Irina Komnova	10.375
2nd place, silver medalist(s)	Arina Strukova	10.355
3rd place, bronze medalist(s)	Olga Astafyeva	10.275
4	Rukhshona Azamova	10.250
5	Sofia Suvorova	10.075
6	Elizaveta Sokolova	9.850
7	Maria Beletskaya	9.825
8	Elena Gerasimova	9.450

=== Youth Floor Exercise Final (2nd Level) ===
Rank	Gymnast	Total
1st place, gold medalist(s)	Olga Astafyeva	10.925
2nd place, silver medalist(s)	Arina Strukova	10.875
3rd place, bronze medalist(s)	Rukhshona Azamova	10.700
4	Vladislava Urazova	10.250
5	Yana Vorona	10.100
6	Yulia Grigoryeva	9.875
7	Polina Golubovskaya	9.600
8	Maria Tatsenko	8.275

== European Championships team selections ==
The team to the 2014 European Women's Artistic Gymnastics Championships was announced in April 2014.

	Senior	Junior
1	Aliya Mustafina	Maria Bondareva
2	Maria Kharenkova	Anastasia Dmitrieva
3	Alla Sosnitskaya	Angelina Melnikova
4	~~Viktoria Komova~~	Seda Tutkhalyan
5	Daria Spiridonova	Daria Skrypnik
	~~Ekaterina Kramarenko~~	
	Anna Rodionova (added)	
