= 2014 Russian Cup =

Gymnastics competition in Russia

The 2014 Russian Cup was held in Penza, Russia from 27-31 August 2014.

== Medal winners ==
Event	Gold	Silver	Bronze
Women
Team	Moscow; Aliya Mustafina; Alla Sosnitskaya; Maria Paseka; Daria Spiridonova	Saint Petersburg; Tatiana Nabieva; Lilia Akhaimova; Alla Sidorenko; Ekaterina Kramarenko	Central Federal District; Viktoria Komova; Kristina Kruglikova; Daria Elizarova; Maria Kharenkova
All-Around	Aliya Mustafina	Maria Kharenkova	Daria Spiridonova
Vault	Alla Sosnitskaya	Tatiana Nabieva	Maria Paseka
Uneven Bars	Viktoria Komova	Aliya Mustafina	Daria Spiridonova
Balance Beam	Aliya Mustafina	Maria Kharenkova	Daria Spiridonova
Floor Exercise	Aliya Mustafina	Daria Elizarova	Maria Kharenkova

== Result ==
=== Senior Team Final ===
Rank	Team	Vault (gymnastics)	Uneven bars	Balance beam	Floor (gymnastics)	Total
1st place, gold medalist(s)	Moscow	43.367	43.166	41.700	40.400	168.633
1st place, gold medalist(s)	Alla Sosnitskaya	14.300	13.300	13.100	12.533	168.633
1st place, gold medalist(s)	Aliya Mustafina		15.033	14.900	14.300	168.633
1st place, gold medalist(s)	Daria Spiridonova	13.767	14.833	13.700		168.633
1st place, gold medalist(s)	Maria Paseka	15.300			13.567	168.633
2nd place, silver medalist(s)	Saint Petersburg	42.534	41.567	40.633	38.733	163.467
2nd place, silver medalist(s)	Ekaterina Kramarenko	14.067	14.567	14.333	12.433	163.467
2nd place, silver medalist(s)	Tatiana Nabieva	14.700	14.033	13.133		163.467
2nd place, silver medalist(s)	Lilia Akhaimova	13.767		13.367	13.633	163.467
2nd place, silver medalist(s)	Alla Sidorenko		12.967		12.667	163.467
3rd place, bronze medalist(s)	Central Federal District	41.000	40.667	39.101	39.333	160.101
3rd place, bronze medalist(s)	Maria Kharenkova	14.000	13.900	14.867	13.767	160.101
3rd place, bronze medalist(s)	Daria Elizarova	13.200	12.367	11.967	13.333	160.101
3rd place, bronze medalist(s)	Kristina Kruglikova	13.800		12.267	12.233	160.101
3rd place, bronze medalist(s)	Viktoria Komova		14.400			160.101
4	Volga Federal District	37.733	40.033	36.467	35.533	149.766
4	Polina Fedorova	13.300	13.033	12.267	12.400	149.766
4	Olga Bikmurzina	13.533	12.900	11.833	12.100	149.766
4	Anna Rodionova		14.100	12.367		149.766
4	Lina Akhmetshina	10.900			11.033	149.766
5	Southern Federal District	39.000	34.767	37.700	37.334	147.801 (-1.000)
5	Maria Kharenkova	14.000	13.900	14.867	13.767	147.801 (-1.000)
5	Elena Sherbakova	12.500	11.467	10.800		147.801 (-1.000)
5	Valeria Golenisheva		9.400	12.033	11.267	147.801 (-1.000)
5	Natalia Medvedeva	12.500			12.300	147.801 (-1.000)

=== All-Around Result ===
Rank	Gymnast	Team	Vault (gymnastics)	Uneven bars	Balance beam	Floor (gymnastics)	Total
1st place, gold medalist(s)	Aliya Mustafina	Moscow	14.833	15.400	14.600	14.300	59.133
2nd place, silver medalist(s)	Maria Kharenkova	Southern Federal District	14.100	13.867	16.200	13.667	57.834
3rd place, bronze medalist(s)	Daria Spiridonova	Moscow	13.833	15.033	14.233	13.700	56.799
4	Alla Sosnitskaya	Moscow	14.533	13.833	14.033	14.033	56.432
5	Ekaterina Kramarenko	Saint Petersburg	13.900	14.667	13.600	13.367	55.534
6	Daria Elizarova	Central Federal District	13.700	13.633	13.633	14.467	55.433
7	Tatiana Nabieva	Saint Petersburg	14.267	14.533	13.367	12.667	54.834
8	Olga Bikmurzina	Volga Federal District	13.533	13.300	13.733	13.700	54.266
9	Polina Fedorova	Volga Federal District	13.600	11.533	14.400	14.167	53.700
10	Lilia Akhaimova	Saint Petersburg	14.133	12.500	13.167	13.767	53.567
11	Alla Sidorenko	Saint Petersburg	13.333	13.367	13.133	13.300	53.133
12	Anastasia Cheong	Saint Petersburg	13.800	11.033	13.667	13.533	52.033
13	Alexandra Yazydzhyan	Moscow	13.533	12.600	11.667	13.367	51.167
14	Kristina Kruglikova	Central Federal District	13.700	11.267	12.900	12.800	50.667
15	Lina Akhmetshina	Volga Federal District	13.133	10.000	11.567	11.800	46.500
16	Elena Sherbakova	Southern Federal District	12.700	10.333	12.533	10.400	45.966
17	Natalia Medvedeva	Southern Federal District	13.033	9.467	11.067	12.367	45.934
18	Arina Nedovesova	Far Eastern Federal District	11.800	10.567	11.367	12.067	45.801
19	Valeria Golenisheva	Southern Federal District	10.267	9.133	11.867	12.000	43.267
20	Maria Paseka	Moscow	14.633	13.300		14.200	42.133
21	Anna Vanyushkina	Northwestern Federal District	12.533		11.467	12.100	36.100
22	Anna Rodionova	Volga Federal District		14.467	13.367		27.834
23	Viktoria Komova	Moscow		14.700			14.700
24	Anastasia Osetrova	Southern Federal District			10.100		10.100

=== Vault Final ===
Rank	Gymnast	Represent	Total
1st place, gold medalist(s)	Alla Sosnitskaya	Moscow	14.534
2nd place, silver medalist(s)	Tatiana Nabieva	Saint Petersburg	14.317
3rd place, bronze medalist(s)	Maria Paseka	Moscow	14.117
4	Lilia Akhaimova	Saint Petersburg	13.783
5	Kristina Kruglikova	Central Federal District	13.683
6	Anastasia Cheong	Saint Petersburg	13.350
7	Olga Bikmurzina	Volga Federal District	12.867
8	Anna Vanyushkina	Northwestern Federal District	12.600

=== Uneven Bars Final ===
Rank	Gymnast	Represent	Total
1st place, gold medalist(s)	Viktoria Komova	Central Federal District	15.367
2nd place, silver medalist(s)	Aliya Mustafina	Moscow	15.267
3rd place, bronze medalist(s)	Daria Spiridonova	Moscow	14.933
4	Ekaterina Kramarenko	Saint Petersburg	14.767
5	Tatiana Nabieva	Saint Petersburg	14.200
6	Anna Rodionova	Volga Federal District	14.067
7	Alla Sosnitskaya	Moscow	13.933
8	Maria Kharenkova	Southern Federal District	13.733

=== Balance Beam Final ===
Rank	Gymnast	Represent	Total
1st place, gold medalist(s)	Aliya Mustafina	Moscow	15.567
2nd place, silver medalist(s)	Maria Kharenkova	Southern Federal District	14.833
-	Ekaterina Kramarenko	Saint Petersburg	14.133
3rd place, bronze medalist(s)	Daria Spiridonova	Moscow	13.933
4	Polina Fedorova	Volga Federal District	13.867
5	Anastasia Cheong	Saint Petersburg	13.400
6	Daria Elizarova	Central Federal District	12.600
7	Alla Sosnitskaya	Moscow	12.467
8	Olga Bikmurzina	Volga Federal District	11.900

=== Floor Exercise Final ===
Rank	Gymnast	Represent	Total
1st place, gold medalist(s)	Aliya Mustafina	Moscow	14.700
2nd place, silver medalist(s)	Daria Elizarova	Central Federal District	14.000
3rd place, bronze medalist(s)	Maria Kharenkova	Southern Federal District	13.933
4	Alla Sosnitskaya	Moscow	13.633
5	Polina Fedorova	Volga Federal District	13.433
5	Maria Paseka	Moscow	13.433
7	Lilia Akhaimova	Saint Petersburg	13.400
8	Olga Bikmurzina	Volga Federal District	12.700
-	Ekaterina Kramarenko	Saint Petersburg	12.100

== World Championships team selections ==
The team to the 2014 World Artistic Gymnastics Championships was announced on 31 August 2014.

	Senior
1	Aliya Mustafina
2	Maria Kharenkova
3	~~Maria Paseka~~
4	Daria Spiridonova
5	Ekaterina Kramarenko
6	Alla Sosnitskaya
-	Tatiana Nabieva (added)
-	~~Ksenia Afanasyeva~~
-	Polina Fedorova (alternate)
