= Darya Elizarova =

Russian gymnast (born 1991)

- Full name: Darya Sergeyevna Elizarova
- Alternative name: Daria
- Born: 28 January 1991 (age 35) Tula, Russia
- Height: 142 cm (4 ft 8 in)

Gymnastics career
- Discipline: Women's artistic gymnastics
- Country represented: Russia
- Former countries represented: Uzbekistan
- Former coaches: Elena Gayderova, Olga Baranova
Medal record
Representing Russia
Summer Universiade
Gold medal – first place	2015 Gwangju	Team
Gold medal – first place	2017 Taipei	Team
Silver medal – second place	2015 Gwangju	Floor exercise
Bronze medal – third place	2015 Gwangju	Vault
Representing Uzbekistan
Asian Games
Bronze medal – third place	2010 Guangzhou	Team

Darya Sergeyevna Elizarova (Russian: Дарья Сергеевна Елизарова; born 28 January 1991) is a Russian former artistic gymnast who also competed for Uzbekistan. She won a bronze medal with Uzbekistan in the team competition at the 2010 Asian Games. While competing for Russia, she won three medals at the 2015 Summer Universiade. Earlier in her career, she won three gold medals at the 2006 Junior European Championships, including the all-around title.

== Gymnastics career ==
Elizarova competed with the Russian team that won the gold medal at the 2006 Junior European Championships. Additionally, she won the all-around and balance beam titles. She was an alternate for the 2007 World Championships and 2008 Olympic teams. She placed eighth in the all-around at the 2008 Russian Cup.

Elizarova started competing for Uzbekistan in 2010. At the Asian Games in Guangzhou, she came fourth in the all-around and won a bronze medal with the team. In the event finals, she finished fourth on the uneven bars and eighth on the balance beam and floor exercise. She won the all-around at the 2011 Pre-Olympic Youth Cup held in Bergisch Gladbach, Germany. Then at the 2011 World Championships, she placed 48th in the all-around during the qualification round. She competed at the 2012 Olympic Test Event and finished 48th in the all-around, earning Uzbekistan an Olympic berth that could go to her or Luiza Galiulina. Galiulina ultimately received the Olympic spot.

Elizarova was approved to represent Russia again in international competition in 2015. She represented Russia at the 2015 Summer Universiade and helped the team win the gold medal. Individually, she won a bronze medal on the vault behind teammate Maria Paseka and Great Britain's Kelly Simm. She also won a silver medal on the floor exercise, behind teammate Polina Fedorova. At the 2016 Voronin Cup, she won the all-around competition.

Elizarova won a gold medal with the Russian team at the 2017 Summer Universiade. At the 2018 Russian Cup, she won a gold medal on the balance beam and also won a gold medal in the team competition.

Since her retirement, Elizarova has worked as a gymnastics coach.

== Competitive history ==
Competitive history of Daria Elizarova
Year	Event	Team	AA	VT	UB	BB	FX
2010
2010	Asian Games	3rd place, bronze medalist(s)	4		4	8	8
2013	Russian Cup		8				6
2014	Russian Championships	1st place, gold medalist(s)	8			8	
2014	Russian Cup	3rd place, bronze medalist(s)	6			6	2nd place, silver medalist(s)
2015	Russian Championships	1st place, gold medalist(s)	9			7	
2015	Diyatin Cup	2nd place, silver medalist(s)	1st place, gold medalist(s)	3rd place, bronze medalist(s)		1st place, gold medalist(s)	1st place, gold medalist(s)
2015	Universiade	1st place, gold medalist(s)	7	3rd place, bronze medalist(s)			2nd place, silver medalist(s)
2015	Russian Cup		5				7
2016	Russian Championships	1st place, gold medalist(s)	10				
2016	Voronin Cup		1st place, gold medalist(s)		4	1st place, gold medalist(s)	3rd place, bronze medalist(s)
2017	Russian Championships	2nd place, silver medalist(s)	8	8	7		5
2017	Universiade	1st place, gold medalist(s)					7
2018	Top 12 Series 4	2nd place, silver medalist(s)					
2018	Russian Championships	2nd place, silver medalist(s)	8			5	4
2018	Russian Cup	1st place, gold medalist(s)	6			1st place, gold medalist(s)	
2018	Top 12 Series 1	2nd place, silver medalist(s)					
2018	Bundesliga Finals	3rd place, bronze medalist(s)	5				
2018	Voronin Cup		9				
2019	Top 12 Series 3	2nd place, silver medalist(s)					
2019	Russian Championships	2nd place, silver medalist(s)	5		7	4	6
