= 2016 Voronin Cup =

Mikhail Voronin Cup
- Location: Moscow, Russia
- Date: December 19–21, 2016

The 2016 Mikhail Voronin Cup took place on December 19–20 in Moscow, Russia.

== Competition format ==
All participating gymnasts, including those who were not part of a team, participated in a qualification round, which also served as the team and all-around final. The results of this competition determined which individuals participated in the event finals, in which the eight highest scoring individuals on each apparatus competed.

== Medal winners ==
Event	Gold	Silver	Bronze
Team	Russia; Lilia Akhaimova; Elena Eremina	Germany; Carina Kröll; Emelie Petz	Russia (Dynamo); Margarita Varnakova; Elizaveta Kochetkova
Senior
Individual all-around	Daria Elizarova (RUS)	Polina Fedorova (RUS)	Irina Sazonova (ISL)
Vault	Lilia Akhaimova (RUS)	Irina Sazonova (ISL)	Anna Geidt (KAZ)
Uneven Bars	Polina Fedorova (RUS)	Aleksandra Rajcic (SRB)	Irina Sazonova (ISL)
Balance Beam	Daria Elizarova (RUS)	Polina Fedorova (RUS)	Irina Sazonova (ISL)
Floor Exercise	Lilia Akhaimova (RUS)	Carina Kröll (GER)	Daria Elizarova (RUS)
Junior
Individual all-around	Elena Eremina (RUS)	Elizaveta Kochetkova (RUS)	Elina Vihrova (LAT)
Vault	Emelie Petz (GER)	Elena Eremina (RUS)	Elizaveta Kochetkova (RUS)
Uneven Bars	Elizaveta Kochetkova (RUS)	Elena Eremina (RUS)	Arailym Meiram (KAZ)
Balance Beam	Varvara Zubova (RUS)	Mariya Lastovskaya (BLR)	Viktoria Trykina (RUS)
Floor Exercise	Elizaveta Kochetkova (RUS)	Viktoria Trykina (RUS)	Elina Vihrova (LAT)
