= 2012 Russian Cup =

Gymnastics competition in Russia

The 2012 Russian Cup, a Russian national artistic gymnastics competition, was held in Penza, Russia, from 12 to 17 June 2012.

== Medal winners ==
Moscow, led by Aliya Mustafina, the women's individual all-around champion of the 2010 World Artistic Gymnastics Championships, won the women's team event, which also served as the qualification for all-around and event finals.

Event	Gold	Silver	Bronze
Women
Team	Moscow; Aliya Mustafina; Anna Myzdrikova; Maria Paseka	Central Federal District; Viktoria Komova; Ksenia Afanasyeva; Yulia Inshina; Anna Dementyeva	Volga Federal District; Anna Dementyeva; Anna Rodionova; Alyona Polyan; Olga Bikmurzina
All-Around	Viktoria Komova	Aliya Mustafina	Yulia Inshina
Vault	Anna Pavlova	Tatiana Nabieva	Anna Myzdrikova
Uneven Bars	Aliya Mustafina	Viktoria Komova	Tatiana Nabieva
Balance Beam	Viktoria Komova	Aliya Mustafina	Anna Dementyeva
Floor Exercise	Aliya Mustafina	Viktoria Komova	Anastasia Sidorova
