= 2014 Gym Festival Trnava =

Gymnastics competition in Slovakia

The 2014 Gym Festival Trnava was a competition held in Trnava, Slovakia from June 7–08.

== Medal winners ==
| Event | Gold | Silver | Bronze |
|---|---|---|---|
| Junior Team | VVS CSKA Dzerzhinsk | Czech Republic | Russia |
| Senior All-around | Anna Pavlova (AZE) | Lisa Katharina Hill (GER) | Barbora Mokošová (SVK) |
| Junior All-around | Angelina Simakova (RUS) | Aneta Holasová (CZE) | Maria Butskikh (RUS) |
| Vault | Anna Pavlova (AZE) | Lyubov Nosova (RUS) | Alexandra Yazydzhyan (RUS) |
| Uneven Bars | Lisa Katharina Hill (GER) | Alexandra Yazydzhyan (RUS) | Anna Pavlova (AZE) |
| Balance Beam | Anna Pavlova (AZE) | Maelys Plessis (FRA) | Julie Hajkova (CZE) |
| Floor Exercise | Alexandra Yazydzhyan (RUS) | Maelys Plessis (FRA) | Barbora Mokošová (SVK) |

== Result ==
=== Junior Team Final ===
| Rank | Team | Vault (gymnastics) | Uneven bars | Balance beam | Floor (gymnastics) | Total |
|---|---|---|---|---|---|---|
| 1st place, gold medalist(s) | VVS CSKA Dzerzhinsk | 26.650 | 23.650 | 24.950 | 27.150 | 102.400 |
| 1st place, gold medalist(s) | Angelina Simakova | 13.700 | 12.050 | 12.400 | 13.900 | 102.400 |
| 1st place, gold medalist(s) | Maria Butskikh | 12.950 | 11.600 | 12.550 | 13.250 | 102.400 |
| 2nd place, silver medalist(s) | Czech Republic | 26.050 | 23.100 | 23.350 | 26.900 | 99.400 |
| 3rd place, bronze medalist(s) | Russia | 25.050 | 23.050 | 25.900 | 24.200 | 98.200 |
| 3rd place, bronze medalist(s) | Varvara Zubova | 12.150 | 11.050 | 13.250 | 13.450 | 98.200 |
| 3rd place, bronze medalist(s) | Viktoria Gorbatova | 12.900 | 12.000 | 12.650 | 10.750 | 98.200 |
| 4 | Hungary | 24.700 | 22.350 | 23.200 | 24.050 | 94.300 |
| 5 | Dinamo Moscow | 24.550 | 16.950 | 23.500 | 24.700 | 89.700 |
| 5 | Elnara Ablyazova | 12.800 | 7.400 | 11.700 | 13.050 | 89.700 |
| 5 | Anastasia Fadeyeva | 11.750 | 9.550 | 11.800 | 11.650 | 89.700 |
