= 2011 Russian Artistic Gymnastics Championships =

Gymnastics competition in Russia

Russian Artistic Gymnastics Championships
- Location: Penza, Russia

The 2011 Russian Artistic Gymnastics Championships was held in Penza, Russia in February for WAG.

== Medal winners ==
Event	Gold	Silver	Bronze
Senior
Team	Central Federal District	Moscow	Volga Federal District
All-Around	Anna Dementyeva	Anna Pavlova	Alyona Polyan
Vault	Tatiana Nabieva	Anna Pavlova	Alyona Polyan
Uneven Bars	Tatiana Nabieva	Anna Dementyeva	Viktoria Komova
Balance Beam	Anna Dementyeva	Maria Dunaeva	Yulia Belokobylskaya
Floor Exercise	Yulia Belokobylskaya	Anna Dementyeva	Yulia Inshina
Junior
Team	Southern Federal District	Moscow	Volga Federal Okrug
All-Around	MS:Anastasia Grishina; CMS:Evgeniya Shelgunova	MS:Anastasia Sidorova; CMS:Yulia Chemareva	MS:Anna Rodionova; CMS:Alina Martynova
Vault	MS:Anastasia Sidorova; CMS:Evgeniya Shelgunova	MS:Anastasia Grishina; CMS:Anastasia Belova	MS:Anna Rodionova; CMS:Irina Yashina
Uneven Bars	MS:Anastasia Grishina; CMS:Viktoria Kuzmina	MS:Diana Elkina; CMS:Yulia Chemareva	MS:Kristina Sidorova; CMS:Daria Spiridonova
Balance Beam	MS:Anastasia Sidorova; CMS:Ekaterina Baturina	MS:Anastasia Grishina; CMS:Yulia Ovcharova	MS:Anna Rodionova; CMS:Daria Spiridonova
Floor Exercise	MS:Anastasia Sidorova; CMS:Maria Kharenkova	MS:Anastasia Grishina; CMS:Evgeniya Shelgunova	MS:Kristina Sidorova; CMS:Irina Yashina

Samara's Anna Dementyeva captured the women's all-around title Wednesday as the 2011 Russian Gymnastics Championships began Wednesday at Burtasy Sports Hall in Penza.
