= 2012 Russian Artistic Gymnastics Championships =

Gymnastics competition in Russia

Russian Artistic Gymnastics Championships
- Location: Penza, Russia
- Date: March 20–24, 2012

The 2012 Russian Artistic Gymnastics Championships were held in Penza, Russia in March for WAG.

== Medal winners ==
Event	Gold	Silver	Bronze
Senior
Team	Moscow; Anastasia Grishina; Aliya Mustafina; Maria Paseka; Maria Chibiskova; Anna Myzdrikova	Central Federal District - 2 Ksenia Afanasyeva; Yulia Inshina; Anna Pavlova	Northwestern Federal District; Kristina Goryunova; Maria Dunaeva; Svetlana Vlasova; Anastasia Tatiana Kirilova; Alyona Cheboksarova
All-Around	Aliya Mustafina	Ksenia Afanasyeva	Anastasia Grishina
Vault	Anna Pavlova	Anastasia Grishina	Maria Paseka
Uneven Bars	Aliya Mustafina	Yulia Inshina	Anastasia Grishina
Balance Beam	Ksenia Afanasyeva	Anastasia Grishina	Kristina Goryunova
Floor Exercise	Anastasia Grishina	Ksenia Afanasyeva	Yulia Belokobylskaya
Junior
Team	Moscow	Central Federal District - 2	Northwestern Federal Okrug
All-Around	MS:Polina Fedorova; CMS:Maria Bondareva	MS:Yuna Nefedova; CMS:Polina Spirina	MS:Irina Yashina; CMS:Kristina Levshina
Vault	MS:Irina Voropayeva; CMS:Evgeniya Korolkova	MS:Irina Yashina; CMS:Yulia Starchenko	MS:Marina Borisova; CMS:Maria Bondareva
Uneven Bars	MS:Irina Yashina; CMS:Maria Bondareva	MS:Yulia Chemareva; CMS:Viktoria Kuzmina	MS:Yuna Nefedova; CMS:Evgeniya Korolkova
Balance Beam	MS:Polina Fedorova; CMS:Maria Bondareva	MS:Yulia Ovcharova; CMS:Kristina Levshina	MS:Ekaterina Shtronda; CMS:Viktoria Kuzmina
Floor Exercise	MS:Polina Fedorova; CMS:Maria Bondareva	MS:Irina Voropaeva; CMS:Viktoria Kuzmina	MS:Galina Gannochenko; CMS:Kristina Levshina

2010 world all-around champion Aliya Mustafina continued her impressive comeback at the Russian championships, leading her Moscow team to first place in the team final in Penza.
