= Anastasia Sidorova =

Russian artistic gymnast

- Full name: Anastasia Sergyeevna Sidorova
- Born: September 28, 1996 (age 29) Volgograd, Russia

Gymnastics career
- Discipline: Women's artistic gymnastics
- Country represented: Russia
- Head coach: Olga Sagina
Medal record
Event / 1st / 2nd / 3rd; European Championships / 0 / 1 / 0
Representing Russia
European Championships
Silver medal – second place	2012 Brussels	Team

Anastasia Sidorova (Russian: Анастасия Сергеевна Сидорова, born 28 September 1996 in Volgograd, Russia) is a Russian artistic gymnast. She won three titles at the 2011 Russian junior championships. In 2012, she won silver in the team competition at the 2012 European Championships.

== Competitive history ==
Year	Event	Team	AA	VT	UB	BB	FX
2011	National Championships (Junior) (MS)		2nd	1st	4th	1st	1st
2012	Switzerland vs. Great Britain vs. Russia	1st					
2012	European Championships	2nd					
2012	Russian Cup	4th	8th				3rd
2012	Éva Kanyó Memorial			1st	3rd	1st	
2015	Diyatin Cup			5th			
2015	Russian Cup			7th			8th
2016	Russian Cup	5th		5th		6th	5th
2017	National Championships	5th					

Year	Competition description	Location	Apparatus	Rank-Final	Score-Final	Rank-Qualifying	Score-Qualifying
2012	European Championships	Brussels	Team	2	175.536	2	172.562
2012	European Championships	Brussels	Balance beam			12	14.400
2012	European Championships	Brussels	Floor exercise			33	12.908
