= Yulia Inshina =

Russian-born Azerbaijani artistic gymnast

- Full name: Yulia Andreyevna Inshina
- Born: 15 April 1995 (age 31) Voronezh, Russia

Gymnastics career
- Country represented: Azerbaijan
- Former countries represented: Russia
Medal record
Women's artistic gymnastics
Representing Russia
World Championships
Silver medal – second place	2011 Tokyo	Team
Representing Azerbaijan
Islamic Solidarity Games
Gold medal – first place	2017 Baku	Team
Gold medal – first place	2017 Baku	Floor exercise
Bronze medal – third place	2017 Baku	Balance beam

Yulia Andreyevna Inshina (Russian: Юлия Андреевна Иньшина, born 15 April 1995) is a Russian-born Azerbaijani artistic gymnast. She has been known for her consistent and reliable work, especially on balance beam. A competitor for Russia for several years, she began to represent Azerbaijan in November 2013.

== Personal life ==
Inshina was born on 15 April 1995 in Voronezh, Russia.

== Career ==
In the early years, Inshina trained alongside Viktoria Komova in Voronezh. The latter is her friend and in 2011 was the World all-around silver medalist.

=== 2011 ===
At the 2011 Russian Cup, Inshina placed 5th in the all-around, 5th on balance beam, and 5th on the uneven bars, winning silver on floor exercise. She was chosen as a team alternate for the 2011 World Championships, but made the Russian team after Maria Paseka was injured. The Russian team won the silver medal in the team final, with Inshina contributing a beam score of 14.300. She made the balance beam final, and she finished 6th with a score of 14.525.

=== 2012 ===
In June, Inshina competed at the Russian Cup. She placed third in the all-around behind Viktoria Komova and Aliya Mustafina. She placed fourth on balance beam and on floor exercise. She was added to the Russian Olympic selection squad. In July, Inshina was named an alternate to the Russian team for the Olympics.

=== 2013 ===
In late November, Inshina and fellow Russian gymnast Anna Pavlova changed nationalities and started competing for Azerbaijan. They wanted more opportunities to compete than they were getting in Russia. She continued training in Russia because Azerbaijan does not have adequate equipment or training centers.

== Competitive history ==
Year	Event	Team	AA	VT	UB	BB	FX
2011	National Championships		4th		5th		3rd
2011	Russian Cup		5th		5th	5th	2nd
2011	World Championships	2nd				6th	
2012	National Championships	2nd	4th		2nd	8th	4th
2012	Russian Cup	2nd	3rd			4th	4th
2013	Russian Cup	3rd	11th				
2014	European Championships						
2014	World Championships						
2014	Voronin Cup	4th	5th		6th	3rd	

- Competitor for Azerbaijan

Year	Competition Description	Location	Apparatus	Rank-Final	Score-Final	Rank-Qualifying	Score-Qualifying
2014	European Championships	Sofia	Team			16	147.729
2014	European Championships	Sofia	Balance Beam			65	11.033
2014	European Championships	Sofia	Floor Exercise			46	12.366
2014	World Championships	Nanning	Team			30	196.328
2014	World Championships	Nanning	All-Around			114	47.599
2014	World Championships	Nanning	Uneven Bars			172	10.533
2014	World Championships	Nanning	Balance Beam			132	12.100
2014	World Championships	Nanning	Floor Exercise			171	11.566

- Competitor for Russia

Year	Competition Description	Location	Apparatus	Rank-Final	Score-Final	Rank-Qualifying	Score-Qualifying
2011	World Championships	Tokyo	Team	2	175.329	2	231.062
2011	World Championships	Tokyo	Uneven Bars			26	13.900
2011	World Championships	Tokyo	Balance Beam	6	14.525	10	14.566
2011	World Championships	Tokyo	Floor Exercise			44	13.433

== See also ==
- Nationality changes in gymnastics
