= Alla Sosnitskaya =

Russian artistic gymnast

- Full name: Alla Arkadievna Sosnitskaya
- Born: 10 April 1997 (age 29)

Gymnastics career
- Discipline: Women's artistic gymnastics
- Country represented: Russia
- Club: CSKA Moscow
- Head coach: Marina Ulyankina
Medal record
Representing Russia
World Championships
Bronze medal – third place	2014 Nanning	Team
European Championships
Bronze medal – third place	2014 Sofia	Team

Alla Arkadievna Sosnitskaya (Russian: Алла Аркадьевна Сосницкая, born 10 April 1997) is a Russian artistic gymnast. She won team bronze medals at the 2014 World and European Championships.

== Career ==
Sosnitskaya is coached by Marina Ulyankina, who also coaches fellow national team members Maria Paseka and Viktoria Kuzmina. Her best events are vault and floor exercise.

=== Junior ===
Sosnitskaya competed at the Russian Championships in 2012, placing eighth on floor exercise.

=== Senior ===
Sosnitskaya made her senior debut at the Russian Championships in 2013, where she won silver with her team. She went on to make her international debut at the Anadia World Cup, where she placed eighth on vault. At the Russian Cup in August, she won gold on floor exercise, silver in the all-around, bronze on vault and uneven bars, and placed fourth with her team and on balance beam. At the Osijek World Cup in September, she placed fourth on vault and bars.

In late October, Sosnitskaya was named to the Russian team for the Élite Gym Massilia in November. In the Master Team division, the Russian team placed second in the all-around, bars, and beam, and fourth on vault and floor. Individually, she placed fourth on floor, sixth on vault, and nineteenth in the all-around. She qualified to the Top Massilia, placing fourth on floor and winning gold on vault. She went on to compete at the Brasilia Gymnasiade, winning gold with her team and in the all-around, silver on vault, and placing fifth on bars and eighth on floor.

Sosnitskaya competed at the 2014 European Championships in Sofia, Bulgaria. In qualifications she scored 14.566 on vault and 14.133 on floor. She qualified in 6th place to the vault final and 7th place to the floor final. In the team final she contributed scores of 14.733 on vault and 13.766 on floor towards the Russian team's bronze medal finish.

== Competitive history ==
Year	Event	Team	AA	VT	UB	BB	FX
2012	National Championships (Junior) (MS)						8th
2013	National Championships	2nd	9th		7th		
2013	Anadia World Cup			8th			
2013	Russian Cup	4th	2nd	3rd	3rd	5th	1st
2013	Osijek World Cup			4th	4th		
2013	Massilia Cup (Master Massilia)	2nd	19th	1st			4th
2013	Gymnasiade	1st	1st	2nd	5th		8th
2014	National Championships	2nd	2nd	1st	3rd	5th	2nd
2014	European Championships	3rd		4th			6th
2014	Russian Cup	1st	4th	1st	7th	7th	4th
2014	World Championships	3rd	7th	4th			
2014	Stuttgart World Cup		6th				
2015	National Championships	2nd	2nd	1st		8th	7th
2015	European Championships		WD				
2015	Russian Cup	1st	9th	4th	1st	5th	
2015	Voronin Cup			1st			
2016	National Championships	2nd		4th			
2017	National Championships	1st		5th			

Year	Competition description	Location	Apparatus	Rank-Final	Score-Final	Rank-Qualifying	Score-Qualifying
2014	European Championships	Sofia	Team	3	169.329	3	170.621
2014	European Championships	Sofia	Vault	4	14.449	6	14.333
2014	European Championships	Sofia	Floor exercise	6	14.266	7	14.133
2014	World Championships	Nanning	Team	3	171.462	3	228.135
2014	World Championships	Nanning	All-around	7	56.166	10	56.740
2014	World Championships	Nanning	Vault	4	14.966	4	15.016
2014	World Championships	Nanning	Uneven bars			16	14.408
2014	World Championships	Nanning	Balance beam			30	13.666
2014	World Championships	Nanning	Floor exercise			29	13.533
