= Tatiana Nabieva =

Russian artistic gymnast

- Full name: Tatiana Olegovna Nabieva
- Nicknames: Tanya, Nabs
- Born: November 21, 1994 (age 31) Pushkin, Russia
- Height: 160 cm (5 ft 3 in)

Gymnastics career
- Discipline: Women's artistic gymnastics
- Country represented: Russia; (2006–2016, 2019)
- Club: Dynamo Sports Club
- Gym: Lake Krugloe
- Head coach: Vera Kiryashova
- Assistant coach: Alexander Kiryashov
- Choreographer: Olga Burova
- Eponymous skills: Uneven bars: piked sole circle to laid-out reverse hecht
- Retired: 2016
Medal record
Event	1st	2nd	3rd
World Championships	1	2	1
European Championships	1	1	1
Summer Universiade	1	3	1
Representing Russia
World Championships
Gold medal – first place	2010 Rotterdam	Team
Silver medal – second place	2011 Tokyo	Team
Silver medal – second place	2011 Tokyo	Uneven Bars
Bronze medal – third place	2014 Nanning	Team
European Championships
Gold medal – first place	2010 Birmingham	Team
Silver medal – second place	2011 Berlin	Uneven Bars
Bronze medal – third place	2010 Birmingham	Vault
Summer Universiade
Gold medal – first place	2013 Kazan	Team
Silver medal – second place	2013 Kazan	Uneven Bars
Silver medal – second place	2019 Napoli	Team
Silver medal – second place	2019 Napoli	Uneven Bars
Bronze medal – third place	2019 Napoli	Vault

Tatiana Olegovna Nabieva (Russian: Татьяна Олеговна Набиева; born November 21, 1994, in Pushkin) is a retired Russian artistic gymnast who has won four World Championship medals. She is known for the F-rated uneven bars skill named after her.

== Gymnastics career ==
=== 2008 ===
Nabieva competed at the 2008 European Junior Championships, earning gold medals in the team competition and floor exercise and silver medals on balance beam, vault and uneven bars. Although no all-around final was held, Nabieva held the highest all-around score in the qualifying competition, ahead of teammate Aliya Mustafina.

=== 2009–10 ===
Nabieva competed at the 2009 and 2010 Russian Championships. In 2009, she finished third in the all-around. In 2010, she competed only on vault and uneven bars due to an injury, and earned a bronze and a gold medal, respectively.

At the 2010 Japan Cup, she introduced a toe-on laid-out Tkachev on the uneven bars (a piked sole circle backwards to a reverse hecht in a layout position over the high bar).

She won gold with the Russian team at the 2010 World Artistic Gymnastics Championships, despite falling on the uneven bars in the team final. It was at these world championships that her original skill was officially named after her. She also qualified for the all-around final, but multiple errors left her in seventh place.

=== 2011–12 ===
Nabieva performed consistently at the 2011 World Championships in Tokyo, competing on the uneven bars and vault and helping Russia win the silver medal. She qualified for the uneven bars event finals and won the silver medal behind teammate Viktoria Komova. She also placed sixth in the vault final with a double-twisting Yurchenko and a Yurchenko half-on piked half off.

In 2012, she struggled with back injuries. She was named as an alternate for the 2012 Summer Olympics in London.

=== 2013–2014 ===
In March 2013, Nabieva placed second at the Russian National Championships on uneven bars, behind Anastasia Grishina.

In July, she returned to international competition at the 2013 Summer Universiade in Kazan with teammates Mustafina, Ksenia Afanasyeva, Maria Paseka and Anna Dementyeva. She contributed scores of 14.850 on vault, 14.400 on uneven bars, 13.750 on beam and 13.050 on floor toward the Russian team's first-place finish, but did not qualify for the all-around final because Afanasyeva placed ahead of her. In the uneven bars finals, she won the silver medal behind Mustafina. She went on to win gold medals in the all-around, uneven bars and vault at the 2013 Russian Cup.

In late 2013, Nabieva announced her retirement from gymnastics via social media after a win at a small French meet. She said: "I want to be a coach. That's my dream, since the very moment I started gymnastics. My dream is to train children and participate with them in the most serious competitions."

Nabieva was persuaded to come out of retirement to compete at the 2014 World Championships. She scored 14.933 on vault and helped the Russian team win the bronze medal.

Tatiana retired from gymnastics in 2016 along with 2008 Olympian Ekaterina Kramarenko and 2012 Olympic team silver medalist Anastasia Grishina, but returned to compete at the 2018 Russia National Championships where she qualified to the vault final.

=== 2019 ===
In July Nabieva competed for the first time internationally since 2014 at the 2019 Summer Universiade alongside Lilia Akhaimova and Ulyana Perebinosova. Together they won silver in the team final behind Japan. During event finals Nabieva won silver on uneven bars behind Hitomi Hatakeda of Japan and won bronze on vault behind Marina Nekrasova of Azerbaijan and teammate Akhaimova.

== Eponymous skill ==
Nabieva has one eponymous uneven bars release skill listed in the Code of Points.

Apparatus	Name	Description	Difficulty (Note: Valid for the 2025–2028 Code of Points)	Added to the Code of Points
Uneven bars	Nabieva	Pike sole circle backward with counter stretched hecht (layout position over high bar) to hang	F (0.6)	2010 World Championships

== Competitive history ==
Competitive history of Tatiana Nabieva
Year	Event	Team	AA	VT	UB	BB	FX
2008
2008	Junior European Championships	1st place, gold medalist(s)	1st place, gold medalist(s)	2nd place, silver medalist(s)	2nd place, silver medalist(s)	2nd place, silver medalist(s)	1st place, gold medalist(s)
2009	Russian Junior National Championships	3rd place, bronze medalist(s)	3rd place, bronze medalist(s)				
2009	Japan Cup	2nd place, silver medalist(s)	3rd place, bronze medalist(s)				
2009	Gymnasiade	1st place, gold medalist(s)	2nd place, silver medalist(s)	1st place, gold medalist(s)	3rd place, bronze medalist(s)		
2010	Russian National Championships	3rd place, bronze medalist(s)		3rd place, bronze medalist(s)	1st place, gold medalist(s)		
2010	European Championships	1st place, gold medalist(s)		3rd place, bronze medalist(s)	4		
2010	Japan Cup	1st place, gold medalist(s)					
2010	World Championships	1st place, gold medalist(s)	7	5			
2011	Russian National Championships			1st place, gold medalist(s)	1st place, gold medalist(s)		
2011	Paris World Cup			2nd place, silver medalist(s)	4		
2011	European Championships			4	2nd place, silver medalist(s)		
2011	Russian Cup			4	2nd place, silver medalist(s)		
2011	World Championships	2nd place, silver medalist(s)		6	2nd place, silver medalist(s)		
2012	Russian Cup			2nd place, silver medalist(s)	3rd place, bronze medalist(s)		
2013	Russian National Championships	4			2nd place, silver medalist(s)		
2013	Universiade	1st place, gold medalist(s)			2nd place, silver medalist(s)		
2013	Russian Cup	1st place, gold medalist(s)	1st place, gold medalist(s)	1st place, gold medalist(s)	1st place, gold medalist(s)	1st place, gold medalist(s)	
2013	World Championships				R1		
2013	Stuttgart World Cup	2nd place, silver medalist(s)					
2014	Russian National Championships	3rd place, bronze medalist(s)	7	3rd place, bronze medalist(s)	6		
2014	Russian Cup	2nd place, silver medalist(s)	7	2nd place, silver medalist(s)	5		
2014	World Championships	3rd place, bronze medalist(s)					
2015	National Championships	4					
2015	Diyatin Cup			1st place, gold medalist(s)	2nd place, silver medalist(s)		
2015	Russian Cup	3rd place, bronze medalist(s)					
2016	Russian National Championships	4	8	2nd place, silver medalist(s)	6		
2016	Russian Cup	3rd place, bronze medalist(s)	7	3rd place, bronze medalist(s)	7	8	
2017	St. Petersburg Championships		1st place, gold medalist(s)				
2017	Sokol Grand Prix	1st place, gold medalist(s)					
2018	Russian National Championships	4	12	3rd place, bronze medalist(s)			
2018	Dityatin Cup		1st place, gold medalist(s)	1st place, gold medalist(s)	1st place, gold medalist(s)		
2018	Russian Cup		5	1st place, gold medalist(s)	4		
2019	Russian National Championships	3rd place, bronze medalist(s)	7	3rd place, bronze medalist(s)			
2019	Universiade	2nd place, silver medalist(s)		3rd place, bronze medalist(s)	2nd place, silver medalist(s)		
2020	Russian National Championships	1st place, gold medalist(s)		1st place, gold medalist(s)	4		

=== International Scores ===
Year	Competition description	Location	Apparatus	Rank-Final	Score-Final	Rank-Qualifying	Score-Qualifying
2010	European Championships	Birmingham	Team	1	169.700	1	168.325
2010	European Championships	Birmingham	Vault	3	14.150	1	14.150
2010	European Championships	Birmingham	Uneven bars	4	14.675	4	14.825
2010	World Championships	Rotterdam	Team	1	175.397	1	234.521
2010	World Championships	Rotterdam	All-around	7	57.298	8	57.565
2010	World Championships	Rotterdam	Vault	5	14.599	6	14.566
2010	World Championships	Rotterdam	Uneven bars			10	14.700
2010	World Championships	Rotterdam	Balance beam			17	14.333
2010	World Championships	Rotterdam	Floor exercise			78	13.066
2011	European Championships	Berlin	Vault	4	14.287	6	14.187
2011	European Championships	Berlin	Uneven bars	2	15.075	3	15.375
2011	World Championships	Tokyo	Team	2	175.329	2	231.062
2011	World Championships	Tokyo	Vault	6	14.349	7	14.224
2011	World Championships	Tokyo	Uneven bars	2	15.000	5	14.883
2013	World Championships	Antwerp	Vault			16	14.099
2013	World Championships	Antwerp	Uneven bars			9	14.533
2014	World Championships	Nanning	Team	3	171.462	3	228.135
2014	World Championships	Nanning	Uneven bars			13	14.600

== Personal life ==
As of 2024, Nabieva works as a gymnastics coach in China. On 24 October 2024, Nabieva married a Chinese citizen, who is also a gymnastics coach, in Shanghai, China.
