= Polina Fedorova =

Russian artistic gymnast

- Nickname: Polisha
- Born: 4 February 1996 (age 30) Cheboksary, Russia

Gymnastics career
- Discipline: Women's artistic gymnastics
- Country represented: Russia
Medal record
Representing Russia
World Championships
Bronze medal – third place	2014 Nanning	Team
Summer Universiade
Gold medal – first place	2015 Gwangju	Team
Gold medal – first place	2015 Gwangju	Floor Exercise
Silver medal – second place	2015 Gwangju	Balance Beam

Polina Fedorova (pron. FYOH-duh-ruh-vuh, Russian: Полина Фёдорова, Polina Fyodorova, born 4 February 1996 in Cheboksary, Russia) is a Russian artistic gymnast.

== Senior career ==
=== 2012 and 2013 ===
At the end of 2012, Polina Fedorova was officially approved as a member of the Russian main artistic gymnastics team for the next Olympic cycle.

At the 2013 Russian National Championships, she won the bronze medal in the all-around team competition (with the team of the Volga Federal District) and silver on the beam.

In November 2013, Fedorova won the all-around gold in the international KSI Cup in Budapest.

=== 2014 ===
At the 2014 Russian Championships, she won the gold medal on the floor.

Fedorova was selected as the alternate for the Russian squad at the 2014 World Artistic Gymnastics Championships. Along with her teammates, she won the bronze medal in team competition, even though she participated in neither the qualification, nor the team final.

=== 2015 ===
Fedorova competed at the Russian Championships in March 2015. She won a bronze with her team. She placed 11th in the all around competition and 6th on the balance beam.

2019

Fedorova was initially named to Russia's team for the 2019 Summer Universiade; however, she was replaced by Uliana Perebinosova before the competition began.

== Competitive history ==
Year	Event	Team	AA	VT	UB	BB	FX
2010	National Championships (Junior) (CMS)		8th			8th	
2011	National Championships (Junior) (MS)		8th		6th	4th	
2012	National Championships (Junior) (MS)		1st	6th		1st	1st
2013	National Championships	3rd	10th			2nd	
2013	Stella Zakharova Cup	1st	4th	3rd		4th	4th
2013	Russian Cup	2nd	6th		5th	3rd	5th
2013	Osijek World Cup					5th	
2013	KSI Cup	1st	1st				
2014	Cottbus World Cup						
2014	National Championships	4th	6th			4th	1st
2014	Russian Cup	4th	9th			4th	5th
2014	World Championships	3rd					
2014	Massilia Cup (Master Massilia)	2nd	18th			4th	
2014	Stuttgart World Cup	2nd					
2015	National Championships	3rd	11th			6th	
2015	Universiade	1st	5th			2nd	1st
2015	Russian Cup	4th	8th				
2015	Russian Hopes	1st	1st				
2016	National Championships	3rd	11th	7th		6th	
2016	Russian Cup	2nd	9th			4th	
2016	Voronin Cup		2nd		1st	2nd	
2017	National Championships	4th	12th				
2018	National Championships		15			3rd place, bronze medalist(s)	
