= Anastasia Grishina =

Russian artistic gymnast (born 1996)

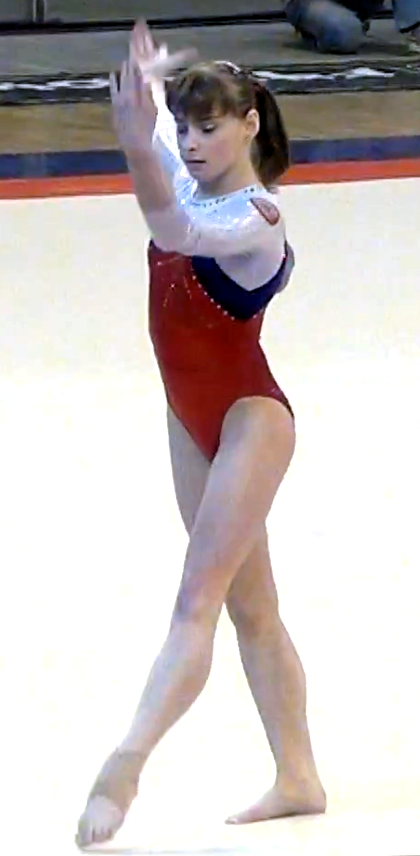

Personal information
- Full name: Anastasia Nikolayevna Grishina
- Nickname: Nastia
- Born: 16 January 1996 (age 30) Moscow, Russia
- Height: 146 cm (4 ft 9 in)

Gymnastics career
- Discipline: Women's artistic gymnastics
- Country represented: Russia (2010–2015)
- Club: CSKA Moscow
- Gym: "Lake Krugloe"
- Head coaches: Viktor Razumovsky and Irina Razumovskaya
- Former coach: Sergey Borisovich Zelikson
- Choreographer: Olga Burova
- Retired: January 19, 2016
Medal record
Event	1st	2nd	3rd
Olympic Games	0	1	0
European Championships	0	2	2
Total	0	3	2
Representing Russia
Olympic Games
Silver medal – second place	2012 London	Team
European Championships
Silver medal – second place	2012 Brussels	Team
Silver medal – second place	2012 Brussels	Uneven Bars
Bronze medal – third place	2013 Moscow	All-Around
Bronze medal – third place	2013 Moscow	Balance Beam

Anastasia Nikolayevna Grishina (Russian: Анастасия Николаевна Гришина) (born 16 January 1996) is a former Russian artistic gymnast. She was a member of the silver medal-winning Russian team at the 2012 Summer Olympics, and the 2013 European all around bronze medalist.

== Junior career ==
=== 2010 ===
In April, Grishina competed at the European Championships in Birmingham, United Kingdom. She placed second in the all around competition with a score of 56.950. In event finals, she placed first on uneven bars scoring 15.375 and first on floor scoring 14.275.

Grishina did not compete for the rest of the year because she was resting a sore back. At the end of the year she told International Gymnast Magazine, "The best moments in 2010 were that I performed well at the European Championships, and I finished the first term at school with 13 5s (As) and three 4s (Bs). This year I'm finishing my ninth grade exams, and it would be good to pass the exams. And in gymnastics, I want to go to the European Youth Olympic Festival in Turkey and do well. Right now I have everything in order (with my health) and if all goes well, then I will compete at the Russian Championships."

=== 2011 ===
In March, Grishina competed at the City of Jesolo Trophy in Jesolo, Italy. She placed fifth in the all around competition with a score of 57.050.

In April, Grishina competed at the Russian National Championships in Penza, Russia. She won the all around competition with a two-day combined score of 117.775.

In May, Grishina competed at the Zakharova Cup in Kyiv, Ukraine. She won the all around competition with a score of 59.950.

In July, Grishina was meant to compete at the European Youth Olympic Festival in Trabzon, Turkey but she injured her hamstring.

== Senior career ==
=== 2012 ===
"Grishina is a great young talent coming up. She's a very interesting gymnast, very beautiful. She's light, she's flexible, she can do good difficulty. It just so happens she's missed a lot of competition lately. But I have high hopes for Grishina and I'm looking forward to seeing how she performs on the podium."

— Alexander Alexandrov, 2012

Grishina performing on floor at the London Prepares series in January 2012

Grishina performing on floor at the 2012 City of Jesolo Trophy in Jesolo, Italy

In January, Grishina competed at the Gymnastics Olympic Test Event as part of the London Prepares series in London, United Kingdom. She placed tenth in the all around competition with a score of 55.091. In event finals, she placed seventh on vault scoring 12.633 and first on uneven bars scoring 15.033.

In March, Grishina competed at the Russian National Championships in Penza, Russia. She placed third in the all around competition with a score of 57.699. In event finals, she placed second on vault scoring 14.340, third on uneven bars scoring 14.240, second on balance beam scoring 14.480, and first on floor scoring 14.640.

At the end of March, Grishina competed at the City of Jesolo Trophy in Jesolo, Italy, She placed fifth in the all around competition with a score of 57.850.

In May, Grishina competed at the European Championships in Brussels, Belgium. She contributed an all around score of 58.898 toward the Russian team's second-place finish. In event finals, she placed fifth on vault scoring 14.266, second on uneven bars scoring 15.200, and fourth on balance beam scoring 14.066. Grishina said, "The results were quite normal on the day of qualifications. I made a mistake on floor and took second place in the all-around, but unfortunately I didn’t advance to the final on floor. But in the team final I didn’t fall anywhere, and I was first all-around. This says that making a mistake is not allowable. As for the mood of the team, we're sorry that it was a little insufficient to reach first place in Brussels. So we need to polish our programs for victory in London. To win with the team, we will have to increase our difficulty on vault. My vault in Brussels wasn’t competitive because of its low start value. I would like to make my vault more difficult, and increase my difficulty on bars a little. I want to polish my choreography on floor, so my turns will be more stable. I would like to tell my fans to cheer for me in London and I will really, really try to please them with my performances."

In June, Grishina competed at the Russian Cup in Penza, Russia. She placed second on uneven bars with a score of 15.450.

==== London Olympics ====
At the end of July, Grishina competed at the 2012 Summer Olympics in London, United Kingdom. In qualifications, she placed twelfth all around with a score of 57.332 but did not advance to the all around final due to the two per country rule. In the team final, she contributed scores of 14.700 on uneven bars and 12.466 on floor towards the Russian team's second-place finish.

=== 2013 ===
In January, Grishina began training with coaches Viktor Razumovsky and Irina Razumovskaya.

In March, Grishina competed at the Russian National Championships in Penza, Russia. She placed second in the all around with a score of 57.400. Grishina contributed an all around score of 55.650 toward the Moscow team's second-place finish and she placed first in the uneven bars final scoring 15.100.

Later in March, Grishina competed at the 37th Tournament of Masters in Cottbus, Germany. In qualifications, she placed first on the uneven bars scoring of 14.900 and first on balance beam scoring 14.050. In the finals, Grishina placed first on uneven bars scoring 14.375 and first on balance beam scoring 14.600.

In April, Grishina competed at the European Championships in Moscow, Russia. In qualifications, she placed third in the all around with a score of 56.065. Grishina placed third in the all around final with a score of 57.932. In event finals, she placed third on balance beam scoring 14.366 and fourth on floor scoring 14.233.

In June, Grishina competed at the Anadia World Challenge Cup in Anadia, Portugal. In qualifications, she placed seventh on uneven bars with a score of 13.375, nineteenth on balance beam with a score of 12.350 and ninth on floor exercise with a score of 13.175. In the uneven bars final, Grishina placed first with a score of 14.750. A back injury sustained during the 2013 Russian Cup in August prevented her from competing at the 2013 World Championships in Antwerp, Belgium.

=== 2014 ===
Grishina competed at the 2014 Russian Championships in Penza in April. She placed third in the senior all-around with a total score of 56.467 on 3 April. In the team final, Grishina contributed scores of 14.600 on balance beam and 13.200 on floor exercise towards the Moscow region's second-place finish. She sustained a knee injury on floor exercise and had to be carried off the podium.

=== 2015–16: Hiatus and subsequent retirement ===
On January 19, 2016, national team co-ordinator Valentina Rodionenko confirmed that Grishina had retired from artistic gymnastics training with immediate effect. The announcement came just three days after her twentieth birthday.

== Competitive history ==
=== Junior ===
Year	Event	Team	AA	VT	UB	BB	FX
2010	City of Jesolo Trophy	1st place, gold medalist(s)	1st place, gold medalist(s)				
2010	European Championships	1st place, gold medalist(s)	2nd place, silver medalist(s)		1st place, gold medalist(s)		1st place, gold medalist(s)
2011	City of Jesolo Trophy	2nd place, silver medalist(s)		1st place, gold medalist(s)			3rd place, bronze medalist(s)
2011	National Championships		1st place, gold medalist(s)	2nd place, silver medalist(s)	1st place, gold medalist(s)	2nd place, silver medalist(s)	2nd place, silver medalist(s)

=== Senior ===
Year	Event	Team	AA	VT	UB	BB	FX
2012	Olympic Test			7	1st place, gold medalist(s)		
2012	National Championships	1st place, gold medalist(s)	3rd place, bronze medalist(s)	2nd place, silver medalist(s)	3rd place, bronze medalist(s)	2nd place, silver medalist(s)	1st place, gold medalist(s)
2012	City of Jesolo Trophy	3rd place, bronze medalist(s)	5				
2012	SUI vs. GBR vs. RUS	1st place, gold medalist(s)	2nd place, silver medalist(s)				
2012	European Championships	2nd place, silver medalist(s)		5	2nd place, silver medalist(s)	4	
2012	Olympic Games	2nd place, silver medalist(s)					
2013	National Championships	2nd place, silver medalist(s)	2nd place, silver medalist(s)		1st place, gold medalist(s)		
2013	Cottbus World Cup				1st place, gold medalist(s)	1st place, gold medalist(s)	
2013	European Championships		3rd place, bronze medalist(s)			3rd place, bronze medalist(s)	4
2013	Anadia World Cup				1st place, gold medalist(s)		
2014	National Championships	2nd place, silver medalist(s)	3rd place, bronze medalist(s)			WD	WD
2015	Moscow Championships	2nd place, silver medalist(s)	2nd place, silver medalist(s)				

=== International scores ===
Year	Competition description	Location	Apparatus	Rank-Final	Score-Final	Rank-Qualifying	Score-Qualifying
2012	European Championships	Brussels	Team	2	175.536	2	172.562
2012	European Championships	Brussels	Vault	5	14.266	5	14.266
2012	European Championships	Brussels	Uneven bars	2	15.200	2	15.333
2012	European Championships	Brussels	Balance beam	4	14.066	6	14.833
2012	European Championships	Brussels	Floor exercise			28	13.133
2012	Olympic Games	London	Team	2	178.530	2	180.429
2012	Olympic Games	London	All-around			12	57.332
2012	Olympic Games	London	Uneven bars			28	14.033
2012	Olympic Games	London	Balance beam			9	14.900
2012	Olympic Games	London	Floor exercise			21	14.066
2013	European Championships	Moscow	All-Around	3	57.932	3	56.065
2013	European Championships	Moscow	Uneven bars			14	13.566
2013	European Championships	Moscow	Balance beam	3	14.366	11	13.400
2013	European Championships	Moscow	Floor exercise	4	14.233	4	14.266

== See also ==
- List of Olympic female gymnasts for Russia
