= Central Federal District =

Coordinates: 54.533°N 37.617°E

Central Federal District Центральный федеральный округ
- Federal district of Russia
- The geographical location of the Central Federal District
- Interactive map of Central Federal District
- Country: Russia
- Established: 13 May 2000
- Administrative Centre: Moscow

Government
  - Presidential Envoy: Igor Shchyogolev

Area
  - Total: 650,205 km^{2} (251,046 sq mi)
  - Rank: 6th

Population (2021 census)
  - Total: 40,334,532
  - Rank: 1st
  - Density: 62.0336/km^{2} (160.666/sq mi)
  - Urban: 82.1%
  - Rural: 17.9%

GDP (nominal, 2024)
  - Total: ₽66.16 trillion (US$776.31 billion)
  - Per capita: ₽1.64 million (US$19,288)
- Federal subjects: 18 contained
- Economic regions: 2 contained
- HDI (2022): 0.815 very high · 3rd
- Website: cfo.gov.ru

Central Federal District in Russia

The Central Federal District (Note: Russian: Центральный федеральный округ, romanized: Tsentral'nyy federal'nyy okrug, IPA: [tsɨnˈtralʲnɨj fʲɪdʲɪˈralʲnɨj ˈokrʊk]) is one of the eight federal districts of Russia. It is in the far west of the country, and can be considered the central region of European Russia. It covers an area of 650,200 square kilometers (251,000 sq mi), and recorded a population of 40,334,532 (82.1% urban) in the 2021 census. Igor Shchyogolev is the presidential envoy to the Central Federal District.

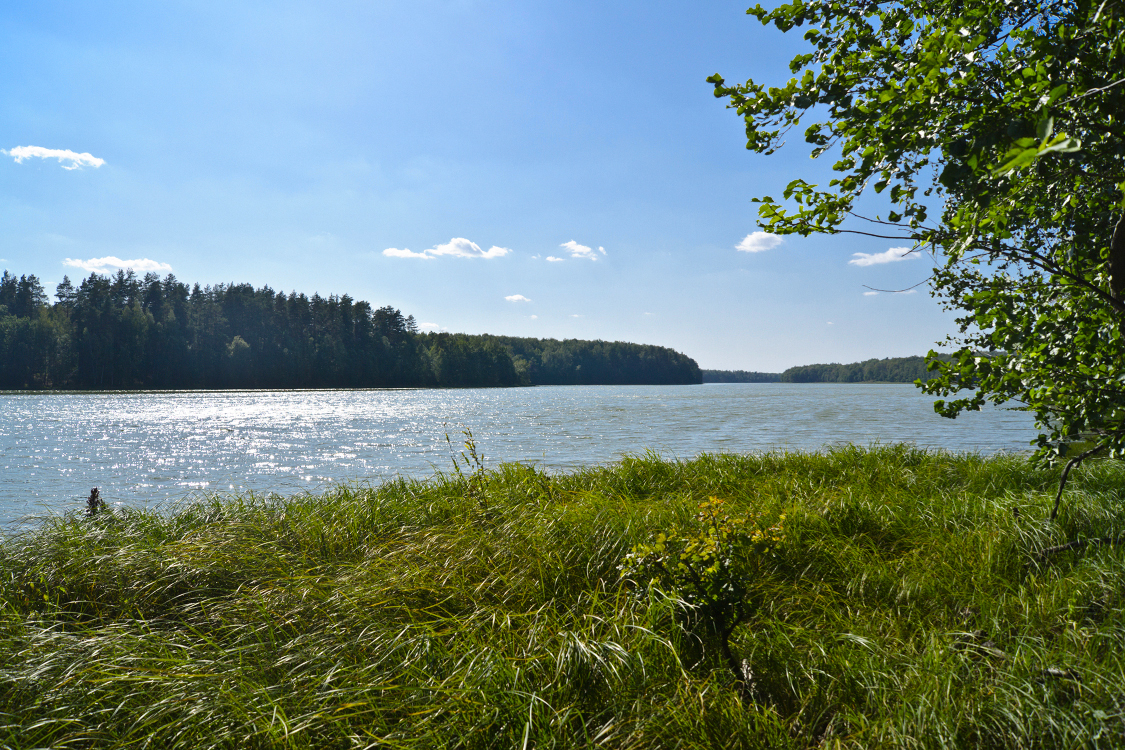
Lake Visha

== Demographics ==
Population pyramid of the Central Federal District at the 2021 Russian Census

=== Federal subjects ===
The district comprises the Central and Central Black Earth economic regions and eighteen federal subjects:

Central Federal District
#	Flag	Coat of Arms	Federal subject	Area in km^{2}	Population	GDP	Administrative center	Map of Administrative Division
1			Belgorod Oblast	27,100	1,540,486	₽1,355 billion	Belgorod	
2			Bryansk Oblast	34,900	1,169,161	₽469 billion	Bryansk	
3			Vladimir Oblast	29,100	1,348,134	₽737 billion	Vladimir	
4			Voronezh Oblast	52,200	2,308,792	₽1,255 billion	Voronezh	
5			Ivanovo Oblast	21,400	927,828	₽300 billion	Ivanovo	
6			Kaluga Oblast	29,800	1,069,904	₽664 billion	Kaluga	
7			Kostroma Oblast	60,200	580,976	₽242 billion	Kostroma	
8			Kursk Oblast	30,000	1,082,458	₽684 billion	Kursk	
9			Lipetsk Oblast	24,000	1,143,224	₽844 billion	Lipetsk	
10			Moscow	2,600	13,010,112	₽24,471 billion	Moscow	
11			Moscow Oblast	44,300	8,524,665	₽6,832 billion	None; most public authorities located in Moscow, subject administration located in Krasnogorsk	
12			Oryol Oblast	24,700	713,374	₽337 billion	Oryol	
13			Ryazan Oblast	39,600	1,102,810	₽532 billion	Ryazan	
14			Smolensk Oblast	49,800	888,421	₽422 billion	Smolensk	
15			Tambov Oblast	34,500	982,991	₽429 billion	Tambov	
16			Tver Oblast	84,200	1,230,171	₽555 billion	Tver	
17			Tula Oblast	25,700	1,501,214	₽868 billion	Tula	
18			Yaroslavl Oblast	36,200	1,209,811	₽690 billion	Yaroslavl	

According to the results of the 2021 census, the ethnic composition of the Central Federal District is as follows:

Ethnicity	Population	Percentage
Russians	31,979,405	93.05%
Armenians	227,833	0.66%
Ukrainians	206,100	0.60%
Tatars	164,436	0.48%
Tajiks	120,594	0.35%
Uzbeks	111,206	0.32%
Azerbaijanis	100,665	0.29%
Belarusians	55,673	0.16%
Georgians	44,860	0.13%
Kyrgyz	44,729	0.13%
Jews	37,709	0.11%
Moldovans	36,764	0.11%
Others	1,238,440	3.60%
Ethnicity not stated	5,966,118	–

Vital statistics for 2022:

- Births: 330,013 (8.5 per 1,000)
- Deaths: 529,175 (13.6 per 1,000)

Total fertility rate (2022):

1.31 children per woman

Life expectancy (2021):

70.85 years

== Economy ==
As of 2020, the GRP in Central Federal District reached RUB33.6 trillion(€407 billion) and around €10,000 per capita.

== Presidential plenipotentiary envoys to the Central Federal District ==
No.	Name (envoy)	Photo	Term of office			Appointed by
No.	Name (envoy)	Photo	Start of term	End of term	Length of service	Appointed by
1	Georgy Poltavchenko		18 May 2000	31 August 2011	11 years, 105 days (4,122 days)	Vladimir Putin
-	Andrey Popov (acting)		31 August 2011	6 September 2011	6 days	Dmitry Medvedev
2	Oleg Govorun		6 September 2011	21 May 2012	258 days	Dmitry Medvedev
3	Alexander Beglov		23 May 2012	25 December 2017	5 years, 216 days (2,773 days)	Vladimir Putin
4	Alexey Gordeyev		25 December 2017	18 May 2018	144 days	Vladimir Putin
5	Igor Shchyogolev		26 June 2018	present	8 years, 135 days (3,057 days)	Vladimir Putin
