= Russian Junior Artistic Gymnastics Championships =

The Russian Junior Artistic Gymnastics Championships (Russian: Первенство России по спортивной гимнастике) are organized annually by the Russian Artistic Gymnastics Federation.

Competitors are divided into the following categories by gender and age: junior males (Russian: юниоры, 14–17 years old), junior females (юниорки, 13–15), boys (юноши, 11–13) and girls (девушки, 9–12). Individual events are further divided by skill levels / difficulties. (Each skill level corresponds to a certain sports degree: Master of Sports [MS] and Candidate for Master of Sports [CMS] for juniors, First Class and Second Class for boys/girls.)

Competitions in different gender and/or age groups may be held at different sites and at different time. (For example, competitions in the older age groups can be held simultaneously with the senior nationals. That was the case in 2010, 2012, 2014 and 2016. In 2018, the competitions in the older age groups were held simultaneously with the Cup of Russia. The lower age groups can be conducted as separate championships.)

== All-around medalists ==
=== Males ===
==== Juniors, MS ====
As of 2019, the competitors are 16–17 years old.

Year	Location	Gold	Silver	Bronze	Ref.
2010	Penza	Maksim Khodykin			
2011	Penza	Maksim Khodykin	Sergei Stepanov	Aleksandr Ruzhitski	
2012	Penza	Sergei Stepanov	Kirill Prokopiev	Grigory Zyryanov	
2013	Penza	Vladislav Polyashov	Andrey Lagutov	Aleksandr Ruzhitski	
2014	Penza	Valentin Starikov	Kirill Potapov	Nikita Nagorny	
2015	Penza	Andrey Makolov	Artem Arnaut	Dmitri Govorov	
2016	Penza	Aleksandr Chicherov	Nikolay Kishkilev	Marat Khabibullin	
2017	Penza	Daniil Ivanov	Mikhail Yurchenko	Aleksei Ryabov	
2018	Chelyabinsk	Sergei Naidin	Yuri Busse	Viktor Kalyuzhin	
2019	Penza	Ivan Kuliak	Ivan Gerget	Kirill Gashkov	
2020	Penza	Timofey Prostakov	Ivan Antonikhin	Daniil Lobach	
2021	Penza	Evgeni Kisel	Daniel Marinov	Timofey Prostakov	

==== Juniors, CMS ====
As of 2019, the competitors are 14–15 years old.

Year	Location	Gold	Silver	Bronze	Ref.
2011	Penza	Grigory Zyryanov	Nikolai Kovinov	Andrei Lagutov	
2012	Penza	Ivan Stretovich	Ilia Kibartas	Artur Dalaloyan	
2013	Penza	Ivan Stretovich	Valenton Starikov	Kirill Potapov	
2014	Penza	Aleksandr Sychugov	Maksim Sinichkin	Ildar Yuskaev	
2015	Penza	Nikolay Kishkilev	Yuri Busse	Mikhail Yurchenko	
2016	Penza	Sergei Naidin	Yuri Busse	Mikhail Khudchenko	
2017	Penza	Valentin Beskhmelnitsyn	Vladislav Lukianov	Lev Sharapov	
2018	Chelyabinsk	Timofey Prostakov	Valentin Beskhmelnitsyn	Ivan Shkurov	
2019	Penza	Timofey Prostakov	Evgeni Kisel	Daniel Marinov	

==== Boys, First Class ====
As of 2019, the competitors are 12–13 years old.

Year	Location	Gold	Silver	Bronze	Ref.
2019	Penza	Vyacheslav Vitkov	Daniil Novikov	Kirill Radionov	

=== Females ===
==== Juniors, MS ====
As of 2019, the competitors are 14–15 years old.

Year	Location	Gold	Silver	Bronze	Ref.
2010	Penza	Maria Paseka	Violetta Malikova	Kristina Kruglikova	
2011	Penza	Anastasia Grishina	Anastasia Sidorova	Anna Rodionova	
2012	Penza	Polina Fedorova	Yuna Nefedova	Irina Yashina	
2013	Penza	Maria Bondareva	Viktoria Kuzmina	Evgenia Zhukova	
2014	Penza	Angelina Melnikova	Seda Tutkhalyan	Daria Mikhailova	
2015	Penza	Daria Skrypnik	Angelina Melnikova	Ekaterina Sokova	
2016	Penza	Anastasia Iliankova	Uliana Perebinosova	Elena Eremina	
2017	Penza	Ksenia Klimenko	Anastasia Agafonova	Varvara Zubova	
2018	Chelyabinsk	Ksenia Klimenko	Vladislava Urazova	Olga Astafieva	
2019	Penza	Vladislava Urazova	Viktoria Listunova	Elena Gerasimova	
2023		Zlata Osokina			

==== Juniors, CMS ====
As of 2019, the competitors are 13 years old.

Year	Location	Gold	Silver	Bronze	Ref.
2010	Penza	Anastasia Grishina	Anastasia Sidorova	Anna Rodionova	
2011	Penza	Evgenia Shelgunova	Yulia Chemareva	Alina Martynova	
2012	Penza	Maria Bondareva	Polina Spirina	Kristina Levshina	
2013	Penza	Seda Tutkhalyan	Anastasia Dmitrieva	Daria Mikhailova	
2014	Penza	Elena Eremina	Ekaterina Sokova	Viktoria Trykina	
2015	Penza	Angelina Simakova	Valeria Sayfulina	Varvara Zubova	
2016	Penza	Ksenia Klimenko	Aleksandra Shchekoldina	Varvara Zubova	
2017	Penza	Olga Astafieva	Irina Komnova	Elena Gerasimova	
2018	Chelyabinsk	Viktoria Listunova	Sofia Koroleva	Nelli Audi	
2019	Penza	Daria Ozhigova	Daria Kholopova	Khristina Kalinina	

==== Girls, First Class ====
As of 2019, the competitors are 11–12 years old.

Year	Location	Gold	Silver	Bronze	Ref.
2014		Angelina Simakova	Varvara Zubova		
2015		Olga Astafieva	Ksenia Klimenko	Anastasia Agafonova	
2016			Nelli Audi		
2017			Nelli Audi		
2018				Diana Kustova	
2019	Penza	Diana Kustova	Marina Budnikova	Elizaveta Us	

==== Girls, Second Class ====
As of 2019, the competitors are 9–10 years old.

Year	Location	Gold	Silver	Bronze	Ref.
2014		Olga Astafieva	Arina Strukova	Sofia Suvorova	
2015		Nelli Audi	Ksenia Cheban	Viktoria Listunova	
