= 2015 Russian Cup =

The 2015 Russian Cup was held in Penza, Russia from September 16 - 20, 2015. The competition served as a test event for the gymnasts that want to compete at the 2015 World Championships.

== Medal winners ==
Event	Gold	Silver	Bronze
Men
Team all-around	Siberian Federal District; Daniil Kazachkov; Nikita Ignatyev; Andrei Cherkasov; Grigory Zyryanov	Moscow; Dmitry Lankin; Nikita Nagornyy; Alexei Kosyanov; Artur Dalaloyan	Central Federal District; Ilya Kibartas; Nikolai Kuksenkov; Kirill Prokopyev; Alexei Rostov
Individual all-around	Nikita Ignatyev	Nikolai Kuksenkov	David Belyavskiy
Floor	Denis Ablyazin	David Belyavskiy	Nikita Ignatyev
Pommel horse	Nikolai Kuksenkov	Ivan Stretovich	Nikita Ignatyev
Rings	Denis Ablyazin	Nikita Ignatyev	Daniil Kazachkov
Vault	Denis Ablyazin	Nikita Nagornyy	Artur Dalaloyan
Parallel bars	David Belyavskiy	Nikita Ignatyev	Nikolai Kuksenkov
Horizontal bar	Nikita Ignatyev Nikolai Kuksenkov	Not Awarded	David Belyavskiy
Women
Team all-around	Moscow; Daria Spiridonova; Alla Sosnitskaya; Seda Tutkhalyan; Maria Paseka	Central Federal District; Maria Kharenkova; Evgeniya Shelgunova; Ksenia Afanasyeva; Viktoria Komova	Saint Petersburg; Lilia Akhaimova; Alla Sidorenko; Anastasia Cheong; Tatiana Nabieva
Individual all-around	Daria Spiridonova	Seda Tutkhalyan	Maria Kharenkova
Vault	Maria Paseka	Seda Tutkhalyan	Ksenia Afanasyeva
Uneven bars	Alla Sosnitskaya	Seda Tutkhalyan	Daria Spiridonova
Balance beam	Maria Kharenkova	Ksenia Afanasyeva	Daria Spiridonova
Floor	Ksenia Afanasyeva	Maria Paseka	Maria Kharenkova

== Women's results ==
=== Individual all-around ===
- Angelina Melnikova, Daria Skrypnik and Natalia Kapitonova competed as guests due to their junior status.

Rank	Gymnast	Gym	Vault (gymnastics)	Uneven bars	Balance beam	Floor (gymnastics)	Total
1st place, gold medalist(s)	Daria Spiridonova	Moscow	14.000	15.400	14.000	13.700	57.100
2nd place, silver medalist(s)	Seda Tutkhalyan	Moscow	14.533	14.233	14.867	13.100	56.733
3rd place, bronze medalist(s)	Maria Kharenkova	Lyubertsy	13.933	14.233	14.500	13.800	56.466
4	Evgeniya Shelgunova	Zvenigorod	14.100	13.800	14.200	14.000	56.100
5	Daria Elizarova	Tula	14.100	13.800	13.900	14.133	55.933
6	Anastasia Dmitrieva	Tolyatti	14.033	12.667	13.700	14.467	54.867
7	Lilia Akhaimova	St Petersburg	13.867	12.500	13.533	14.100	54.000
8	Polina Fedorova	Cheboksary	13.467	12.967	13.567	12.967	52.968
9	Alla Sosnitskaya	Moscow	14.367	14.900	13.200	10.100	52.567
10	Alla Sidorenko	St Petersburg	13.567	13.567	12.933	11.900	51.967
11	Yulia Biryulya	Leninsk-Kuznetsky	13.800	14.100	10.267	11.567	49.734
12	Daria Mikhailova	Moscow	13.400	9.900	13.733	11.933	48.966
13	Anastasia Cheong	St Petersburg	13.633	10.700	11.833	12.200	48.366
14	Arina Nedovesova	Vladivostok	12.467	11.000	12.433	12.367	48.267
15	Maria Iontef	Novgorod	13.233	9.433	11.400	12.633	46.699
16	Evgenia Menovschikova	Anapa	13.767	10.167	10.767	11.867	46.568
17	Anastasia Osetrova	Volgograd	11.800	12.167	10.233	10.767	44.967
18	Ekaterina Ishchenko	Rostov-on-Don	12.567	8.567	11.400	12.333	44.867
19	Viktoria Komova	Voronezh / Moscow	-	15.467	13.667	-	29.134
20	Maria Paseka	Moscow	-	14.800	-	14.133	28.933
--	Angelina Melnikova	Voronezh	14.167	15.067	14.400	13.600	57.234
--	Daria Skrypnik	Krasnodar	13.233	15.400	14.200	-	42.833
--	Natalia Kapitonova	Penza	-	14.833	13.433	-	28.266

=== Vault ===
Rank	Gymnast	Represent	VT1	VT2	Total
1st place, gold medalist(s)	Maria Paseka	Moscow	15.467	15.800	15.634
2nd place, silver medalist(s)	Seda Tutkhalyan	Moscow	14.667	14.133	14.400
3rd place, bronze medalist(s)	Ksenia Afanasyeva	Tula	14.800	13.867	14.334
4	Alla Sosnitskaya	Moscow	13.200	14.067	13.634
5	Anastasia Dmitrieva	Tolyatti	14.300	12.700	13.500
6	Evgenia Menovschikova	Anapa	13.767	13.100	13.434
7	Anastasia Sidorova	Rostov-on-Don	13.833	11.800	12.817
8	Lilia Akhaimova	St Petersburg	13.533	12.033	12.783

=== Uneven bars ===
Viktoria Komova failed to qualify for the final, but competed an exhibition routine.

Rank	Gymnast	Represent	Score
1st place, gold medalist(s)	Alla Sosnitskaya	Moscow	14.733
2nd place, silver medalist(s)	Seda Tutkhalyan	Moscow	14.500
3rd place, bronze medalist(s)	Daria Spiridonova	Moscow	14.433
4	Evgeniya Shelgunova	Zvenigorod	13.800
5	Maria Paseka	Moscow	13.767
6	Maria Kharenkova	Lyubertsy	12.700
7	Viktoria Kuzmina	Moscow	11.667
8	Yulia Biryulya	Leninsk-Kuznetsky	11.500
-	Viktoria Komova	Voronezh / Moscow	15.300

=== Balance beam ===
Seda Tutkhalyan failed to qualify for the final, but competed an exhibition routine.

Rank	Gymnast	Represent	Score
1st place, gold medalist(s)	Maria Kharenkova	Lyubertsy	14.800
2nd place, silver medalist(s)	Ksenia Afanasyeva	Tula	14.333
3rd place, bronze medalist(s)	Daria Spiridonova	Moscow	14.133
4	Evgeniya Shelgunova	Zvenigorod	13.933
5	Alla Sosnitskaya	Moscow	13.833
6	Anastasia Dmitrieva	Tolyatti	13.733
7	Viktoria Komova	Voronezh / Moscow	11.533
8	Daria Mikhailova	Moscow	10.300
-	Seda Tutkhalyan	Moscow	14.233

=== Floor ===
Evgeniya Shelgunova failed to qualify for the final, but competed an exhibition routine.

Rank	Gymnast	Represent	Score
1st place, gold medalist(s)	Ksenia Afanasyeva	Tula	14.700
2nd place, silver medalist(s)	Maria Paseka	Moscow	14.033
3rd place, bronze medalist(s)	Maria Kharenkova	Lyubertsy	13.867
4	Seda Tutkhalyan	Moscow	13.800
5	Lilia Akhaimova	St Petersburg	13.633
6	Daria Spiridonova	Moscow	13.533
7	Daria Elizarova	Tula	13.033
8	Anastasia Sidorova	Rostov-on-Don	12.867
-	Evgeniya Shelgunova	Zvenigorod	13.933

== World championship teams ==
After the competition, provisional teams were announced for the 2015 World Championships.

- Women: Ksenia Afanasyeva, Daria Spiridonova, Seda Tutkhalyan, Maria Kharenkova, Viktoria Komova, Maria Paseka
- Men: Nikita Ignatyev, David Belyavskiy, Nikolai Kuksenkov, Denis Ablyazin, Nikita Nagornyy, Alexei Rostov or Mikhail Kudashov will be the final gymnast

Most notably missing is 2010, 2013, and 2014 World Championship team member, Aliya Mustafina, who will not be competing due to back pain.
