= Angelina Melnikova =

Russian artistic gymnast

Angelina Melnikova Ангелина Мельникова
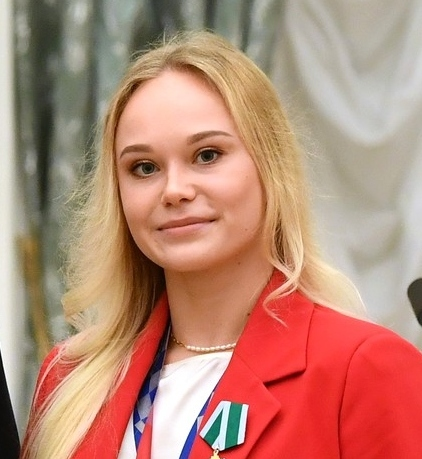
- Melnikova at the Kremlin in 2021

Personal information
- Full name: Angelina Romanovna Melnikova
- Nickname: Gelya
- Born: 18 July 2000 (age 26) Voronezh, Voronezh Oblast, Russia

Gymnastics career
- Discipline: Women's artistic gymnastics
- Country represented: Russia Authorised Neutral Athletes (since 2025); (2014–present)
- Club: CSKA
- Head coaches: Sergei Denisevich, Natalia Ishkova
Medal record
Women's artistic gymnastics
| Event | 1st | 2nd | 3rd |
|---|---|---|---|
| Olympic Games | 1 | 1 | 2 |
| World Championships | 3 | 4 | 3 |
| European Games | 2 | 2 | 0 |
| European Championships | 7 | 4 | 6 |
| FIG World Cup | 1 | 1 | 0 |
| Total | 14 | 12 | 11 |
Representing Russia, ROC, RGF, WG2, and (Individual Neutral Athletes) AIN
Olympic Games
| Gold medal – first place | 2020 Tokyo | Team |
| Silver medal – second place | 2016 Rio de Janeiro | Team |
| Bronze medal – third place | 2020 Tokyo | All-around |
| Bronze medal – third place | 2020 Tokyo | Floor exercise |
World Championships
| Gold medal – first place | 2021 Kitakyushu | All-around |
| Gold medal – first place | 2025 Jakarta | All-around |
| Gold medal – first place | 2025 Jakarta | Vault |
| Silver medal – second place | 2018 Doha | Team |
| Silver medal – second place | 2019 Stuttgart | Team |
| Silver medal – second place | 2021 Kitakyushu | Floor exercise |
| Silver medal – second place | 2025 Jakarta | Uneven bars |
| Bronze medal – third place | 2019 Stuttgart | All-around |
| Bronze medal – third place | 2019 Stuttgart | Floor exercise |
| Bronze medal – third place | 2021 Kitakyushu | Vault |
European Games
| Gold medal – first place | 2019 Minsk | All-around |
| Gold medal – first place | 2019 Minsk | Uneven bars |
| Silver medal – second place | 2019 Minsk | Vault |
| Silver medal – second place | 2019 Minsk | Balance beam |
European Championships
| Gold medal – first place | 2016 Bern | Team |
| Gold medal – first place | 2017 Cluj-Napoca | Floor exercise |
| Gold medal – first place | 2018 Glasgow | Team |
| Gold medal – first place | 2021 Basel | Uneven bars |
| Gold medal – first place | 2026 Zagreb | Team |
| Gold medal – first place | 2026 Zagreb | All-around |
| Gold medal – first place | 2026 Zagreb | Vault |
| Silver medal – second place | 2018 Glasgow | Vault |
| Silver medal – second place | 2019 Szczecin | Uneven bars |
| Silver medal – second place | 2021 Basel | All-around |
| Silver medal – second place | 2021 Basel | Floor exercise |
| Bronze medal – third place | 2018 Glasgow | Uneven bars |
| Bronze medal – third place | 2019 Szczecin | All-around |
| Bronze medal – third place | 2019 Szczecin | Floor exercise |
| Bronze medal – third place | 2021 Basel | Vault |
| Bronze medal – third place | 2026 Zagreb | Balance beam |
| Bronze medal – third place | 2026 Zagreb | Floor exercise |
- Awards: Longines Prize for Elegance (2018)

Angelina Romanovna Melnikova (Russian: Ангели́на Рома́новна Ме́льникова, IPA: [ɐnɡʲɪˈlʲinə ˈmʲelʲnʲɪkəvə]; born 18 July 2000) is a Russian artistic gymnast. With fourteen Olympic and World medals, she is the third-most decorated Russian gymnast of all time. At the 2020 Tokyo Olympics, she led the Russian Olympic Committee to gold in the team competition. She previously represented Russia at the 2016 Summer Olympics, winning a silver medal in the team competition. She was also a member of the gold medal-winning Russian teams at the 2016 and 2018 European Championships, and the silver medal-winning Russian teams at the 2018 and 2019 World Championships.

Individually, Melnikova is a two-time Olympic medalist, an eight-time World medalist, a seventeen-time European Championships medalist, a four-time European Games medalist, and a four-time Russian national all-around champion (2016, 2018, 2024, 2025). She is the 2020 Olympic all-around and floor bronze medalist, the 2021 and 2025 World all-around champion, 2025 vault champion and uneven bars silver medalist, 2021 floor silver medalist and vault bronze medalist, and the 2019 World all-around and floor bronze medalist. She is also the 2019 European Games all-around and uneven bars champion, the 2017 European champion on floor, and the 2021 European champion on uneven bars. In winning the 2021 World all-around title, she became the first non-American to win a World or Olympic all-around title in over a decade.

At the junior level, Melnikova won gold medals at the 2014 European Championships in the team, all-around, and balance beam events and was the 2014 Russian junior all-around national champion. She has been captain of the Russian women's national gymnastics team since 2017.

== Early and personal life ==
Angelina Romanovna Melnikova was born 18 July 2000 in Voronezh, Russia. She has a younger brother named Oleg. She started gymnastics at age six after her grandmother brought her to practice once. When she was thirteen, she moved to Moscow to train at the Round Lake national training center. She studied sport and tourism at the Smolensk State Academy of Physical Education.

== Junior career ==
=== 2014 ===
Melnikova competed at the International Gymnix competition in Montreal and won the team gold medal alongside Anastasia Ilyankova, Daria Skrypnik, and Ekaterina Sokova. Individually, she won the all-around silver medal in the Junior International Cup behind Canadian Rose-Kaying Woo. She also placed second on uneven bars and third on floor exercise. In April, Melnikova competed at the Russian Championships with her home team, the Central Federal District. Her team placed first with a combined total score of 267.966. Individually, Melnikova had a strong showing and placed first in the Junior Master of the Sport division with a score of 58.300. She also won two other gold medals on balance beam and floor exercise with scores of 14.700 and 14.167 respectively. She competed in the uneven bars final and placed seventh.

At the European Championships, Melnikova competed in the junior division alongside teammates Maria Bondareva, Daria Skrypnik, Seda Tutkhalyan, and Anastasia Dmitrieva. As a team, they placed first with a combined score of 168.268. Melnikova then went on to win a gold medal in the all-around and on the balance beam and a silver medal on the uneven bars behind teammate Skrypnik. At the end of the year, she competed at the Top Gym Tournament in Charleroi and won gold in the all-around, vault, and uneven bars finals.

=== 2015 ===
Melnikova competed at the Junior Russian Championships in Penza in early April. She finished in first place with her team, then placed second in the all-around, fifth on uneven bars, first on balance beam, and second on floor exercise. In September, she performed at the Russian Cup; she was ineligible to compete due to her junior status but she was able to perform as a guest. Her overall score of 57.234 was the highest of the competition, beating official champion Daria Spiridonova's score of 57.100.

Melnikova competed at the Elite Gym Massilia meet in Marseille, France in November. She, alongside teammates Daria Skrypnik, Evgeniya Shelgunova, and Natalia Kapitonova, won the silver medal in the team competition. Individually, she won the all-around title ahead of France's Marine Brevet and Romania's Diana Bulimar. Then at the Voronin Cup in December, she won a silver medal with teammate Maria Kharenkova, and she finished second in the junior all-around behind Kapitonova. She won gold in both the vault and floor exercise event finals.

== Senior career ==
=== 2016 ===
Melnikova became age-eligible for senior competition in 2016 and made her senior international debut at the DTB Pokal Team Challenge Cup where the Russian team won the gold medal. Individually, she scored the second-highest all-around score behind 2012 Olympian and reigning European champion Giulia Steingruber of Switzerland. In April, she won her first senior national all-around title; additionally, she placed first on balance beam and floor exercise and finished fifth on uneven bars. In early June, she competed at the European Championships. During the team final, she competed in all four events toward Russia's first-place finish. She also finished fifth in the balance beam event final. Then at the Russian Cup in June, she won the team, all-around, and balance beam gold medals.

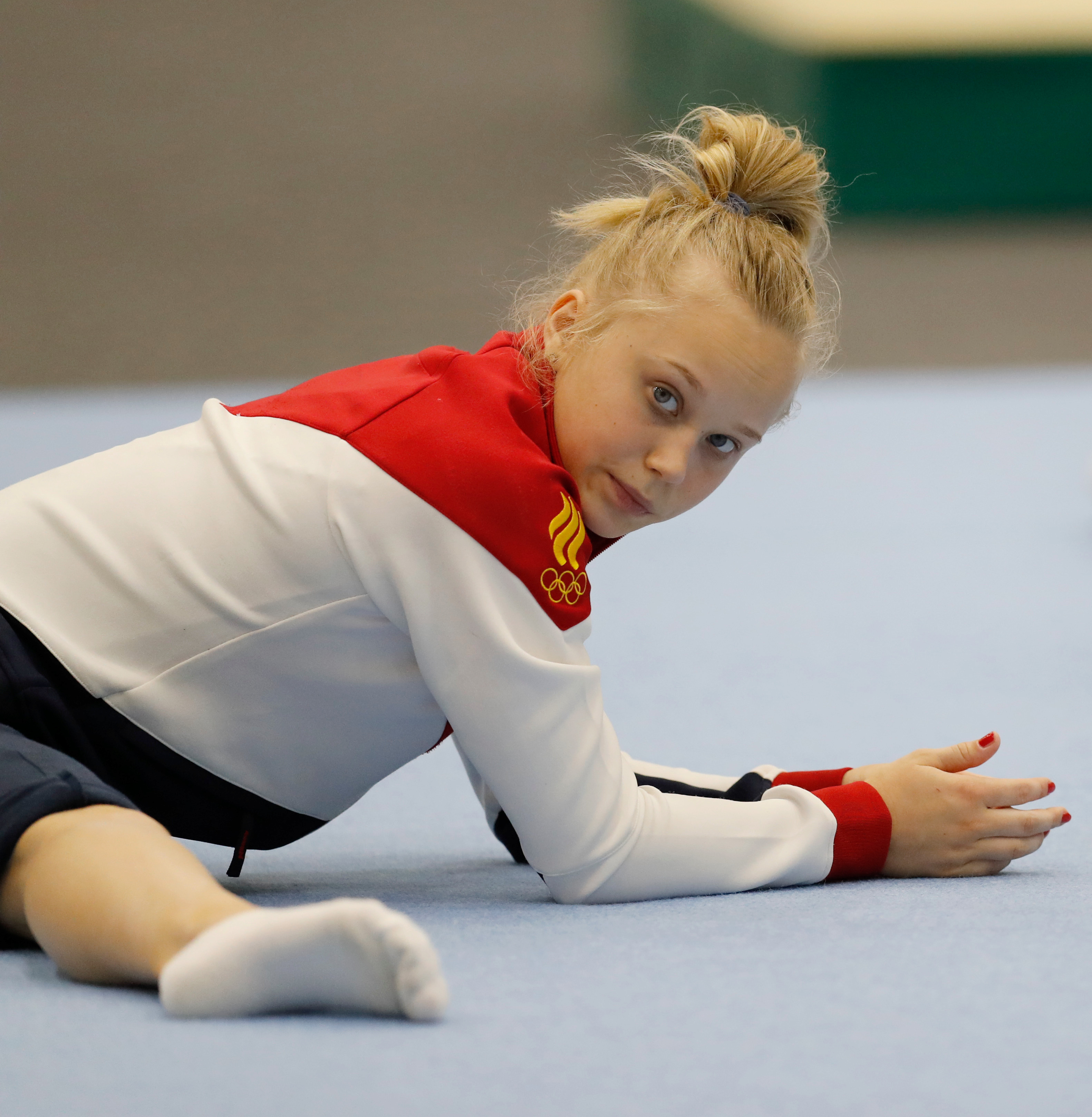
Melnikova in 2016

In July, Melnikova was selected to represent Russia at the 2016 Summer Olympics in Rio de Janeiro, Brazil alongside Aliya Mustafina, Maria Paseka, Daria Spiridonova, and Seda Tutkhalyan. Due to her successful junior career and early season performances, she was expected to advance to numerous Olympic event finals and be in contention for an all-around medal. However, Melnikova performed subpar during the qualification round, partially due to a strained hamstring suffered during podium training. She fell off the balance beam and again on floor exercise, failing to qualify for the individual all-around final or any event finals. She improved upon her performance in the team final; she competed on all four apparatuses but still counted a fall on the balance beam. Her performances helped contribute to Russia's team silver medal.

After the Olympic Games, Melnikova competed at the Arthur Gander Memorial in Chiasso, Switzerland. She won the three-event all-around ahead of Eythora Thorsdottir and Jessica López. She next competed at the Swiss Cup, a mixed pairs event where she was partnered with Nikita Ignatyev. They finished third behind the Ukrainian pair of Angelina Kysla and Oleg Verniaiev and the German pair of Kim Bui and Marcel Nguyen. Melnikova ended the season competing at the Toyota International event held in Japan. She finished fourth on vault but won gold on the uneven bars and silver on balance beam and floor exercise behind Mai Murakami on each.

=== 2017 ===
Melnikova was named as team captain of the Russian women's national team starting in 2017, succeeding Olympic teammate Aliya Mustafina. She started her season at the Russian Championships in Kazan. Although she was expected to do well in the absence of Olympic champion Aliya Mustafina, as well as coming into the meet as the reigning national champion, she faltered throughout the competition on every event except vault. As a result, she finished eleventh in the all-around. Melnikova participated in the Stuttgart World Cup in March, placing second behind Germany's Tabea Alt due to a fall off the balance beam. The following month she competed at the City of Jesolo Trophy where she received three bronze medals in the team event, vault, and floor exercise. At the London World Cup in April, she finished fifth in the all-around. Later that month, it was announced that she would attend the European Championships as part of the Russian team, along with Elena Eremina, Natalia Kapitonova, and Olympic teammate Maria Paseka. During the qualification round, Melnikova fell off the balance beam and uneven bars and did not qualify for the individual all-around final. However, she qualified for the vault and floor exercise finals. She finished eighth in the vault final. During the floor exercise final, she performed a clean routine which resulted in her winning the gold medal ahead of British gymnast Ellie Downie and Eythora Thorsdottir from the Netherlands.

In August, Melnikova competed at the Russian Cup in Ekaterinburg, where she won the all-around ahead of Eremina and Maria Kharenkova. She also placed first on the balance beam and third on vault and in the team competition. After the Russian Cup, Melnikova was selected to represent Russia at the World Championships along with Paseka, Eremina, and Anastasia Ilyankova. She qualified for the all-around final in tenth place with a score of 53.132. She finished sixteenth in the all-around final after falling twice on the floor exercise.

After the World Championships, Melnikova competed at the Mexican Open and won bronze in the three-event all-around behind Yesenia Ferrera and Cătălina Ponor. Then in December, she competed at the Voronin Cup where she finished first in the all-around, ahead of Viktoria Komova. In the event finals, she won the silver medal on vault behind Oksana Chusovitina and on uneven bars behind Uliana Perebinosova.

=== 2018 ===
Melnikova started off her season at the Stuttgart World Cup, where she finished fourth after making mistakes on both the balance beam and floor exercise. However, a week later at the Birmingham World Cup, she won the meet, finishing ahead of USA's Margzetta Frazier. In April, she competed at the City of Jesolo Trophy where she claimed a gold medal with the Russian team, ahead of Italy and Brazil. On vault, she won a silver medal and on uneven bars she claimed the bronze behind teammate Anastasia Ilyankova and USA's Ragan Smith. Then on the balance beam, she won another bronze medal, this time behind the American first-year senior Emma Malabuyo and Smith. She also finished fourth in the all-around and fifth on floor exercise.

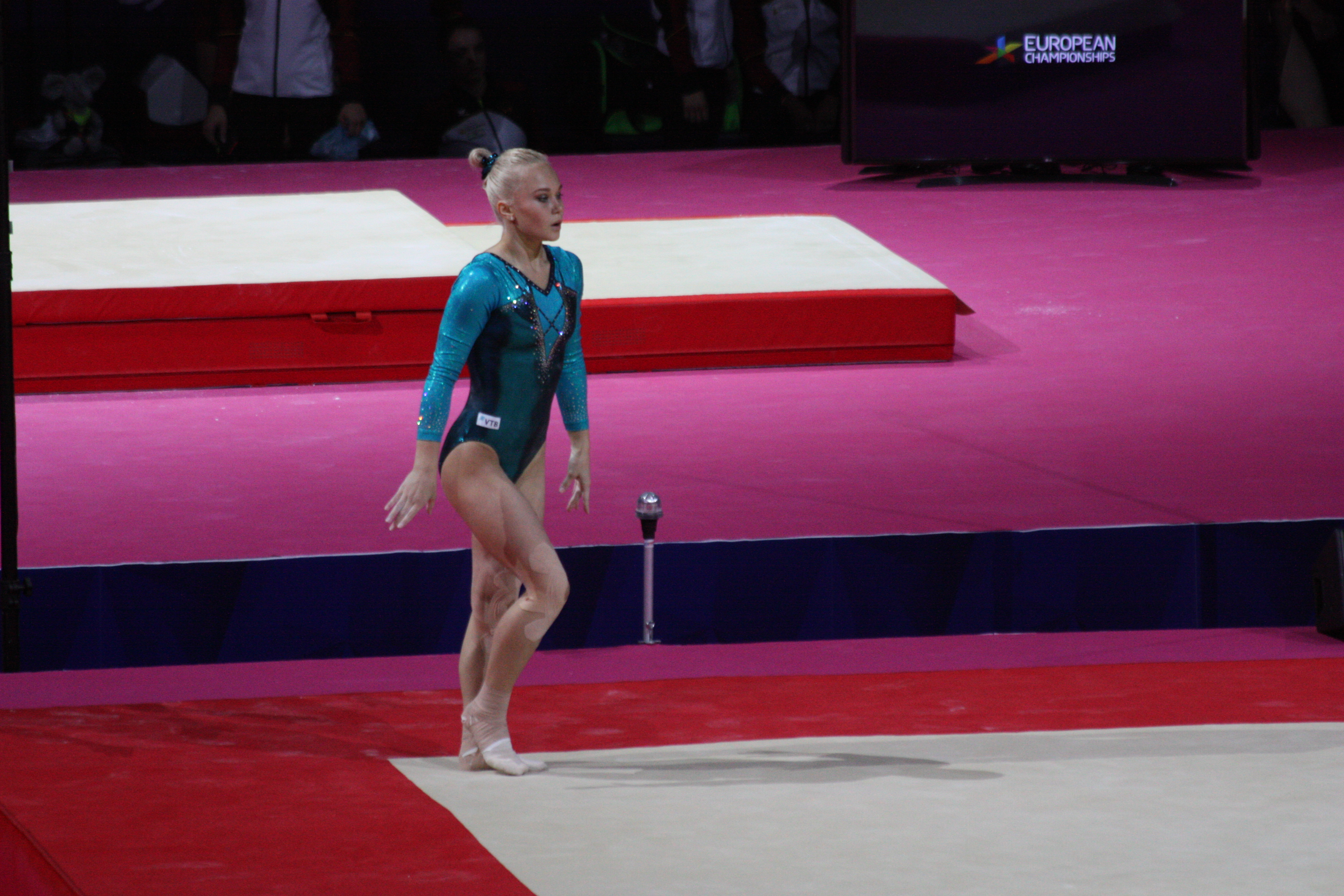
Melnikova competing at the 2018 European Championships

One week later, Melnikova competed at the Russian Championships. On the first day of competition, she earned a silver medal with the Central Federal District team and qualified for the all-around and all four event finals. Melnikova won the gold medal in the all-around ahead of Angelina Simakova and Viktoria Komova. In the event finals, she earned a silver on vault behind Viktoria Trykina, gold on uneven bars, balance beam, and floor exercise. In late June, she competed at the Russian Cup where she finished first in the all-around. She also finished first with the Central Federal District team in the team competition and the uneven bars final.

In August, Melnikova competed at the European Championships in Glasgow. Together with her teammates Simakova, Irina Alexeeva, Lilia Akhaimova, and Yuliana Perebinosova, she earned a gold medal in the team event. In the event finals, she placed second on vault, third on uneven bars, and sixth on floor exercise. On 29 September, Melnikova was named to compete at the World Championships in Doha, Qatar, alongside Akhaimova, Alexeeva, Aliya Mustafina, and Simakova. At the World Championships, she qualified for the all-around final in fifth place and the floor exercise final in third place. Russia also qualified for the team final in second place. During the team final, Melnikova competed on vault, uneven bars, and floor exercise, helping Russia win the silver medal. In the all-around final, she finished in fifth place, just a tenth of a point behind silver medalist Mai Murakami of Japan, 0.034 points behind bronze medalist Morgan Hurd of the United States, and 0.001 points behind fourth-place finisher Nina Derwael of Belgium. She was later awarded the Longines Prize for Elegance alongside compatriot Artur Dalaloyan. She finished fourth in the floor exercise final, 0.033 points behind bronze medalist Murakami.

After the World Championships, Melnikova competed at the Arthur Gander Memorial in Chiasso, Switzerland. She placed fourth in the three-event all-around behind Jade Barbosa and Flávia Saraiva of Brazil and Eythora Thorsdottir of the Netherlands. She then competed alongside countryman Nikita Nagornyy in the Swiss Cup, a unique mixed pairs event. After advancing to the final in first place, they won the silver medal behind German pair Elisabeth Seitz and Marcel Nguyen.

=== 2019 ===
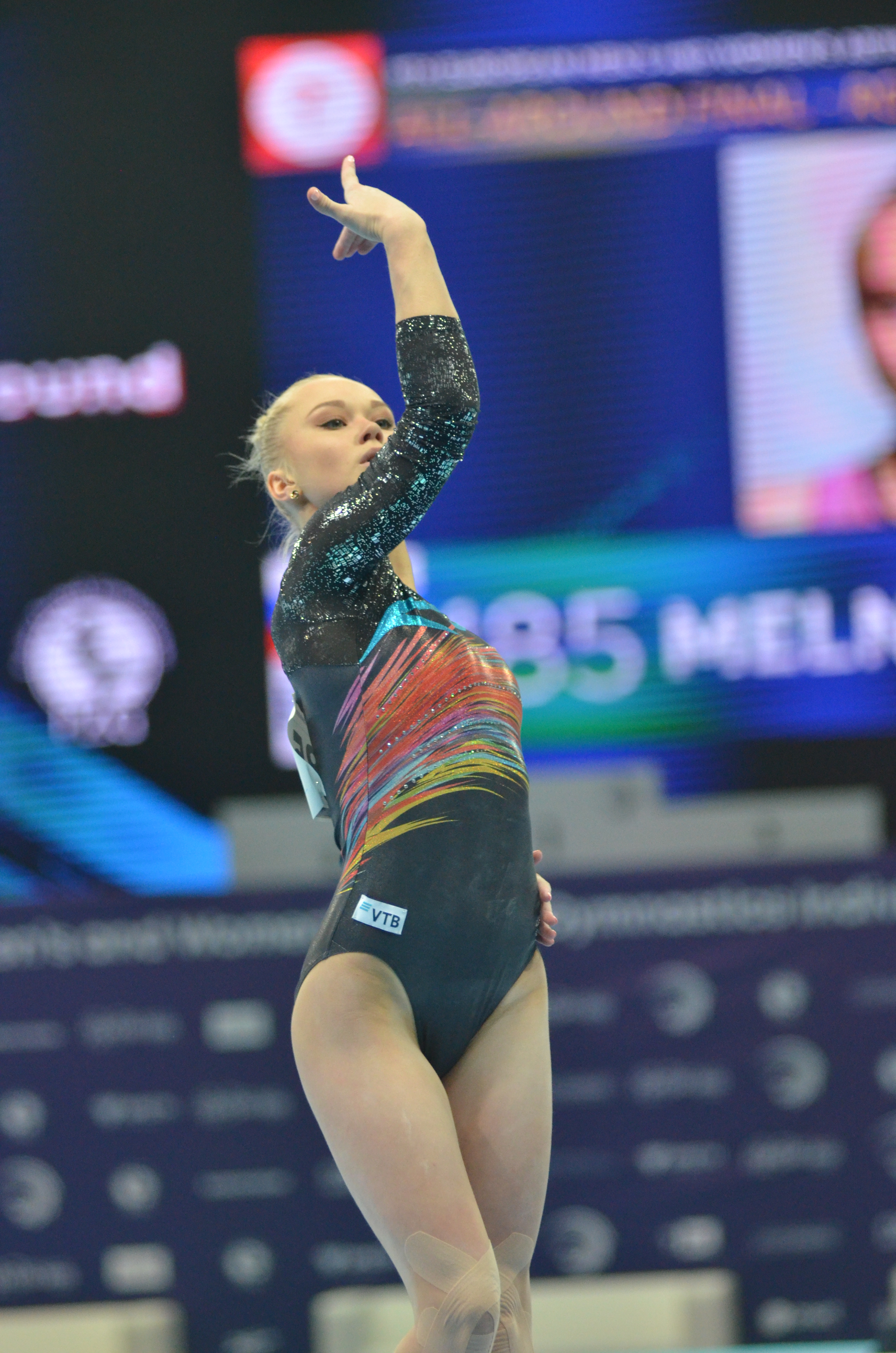
Melnikova competing at the 2019 European Championships

Melnikova began her season at the Russian Championships where she placed second in the all-around behind Angelina Simakova. She won gold on the floor exercise, silver on vault and balance beam, and bronze on uneven bars. As a result, she was chosen to compete at the 2019 European Championships alongside Simakova, Maria Paseka, and Anastasia Ilyankova. Later that month Melnikova competed at the DTB-Pokal Team Challenge in Stuttgart. She won silver in the team final behind Brazil.

At the European Championships, Melnikova won bronze in the all-around final behind Mélanie de Jesus dos Santos of France and Ellie Downie of Great Britain. She placed fifth in the vault final and won the silver medal on uneven bars behind compatriot Anastasia Ilyankova. The next day, she competed the most difficult routine in the floor exercise final and won the bronze medal behind the defending floor exercise champion Mélanie de Jesus dos Santos of France and Eythora Thorsdottir of the Netherlands.

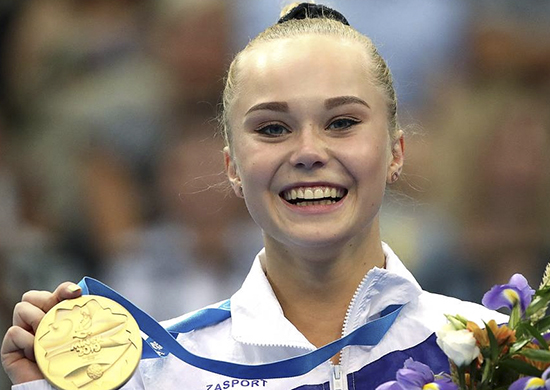
Melnikova at the 2019 European Games

In May, it was announced that Melnikova would compete at the European Games alongside Aliya Mustafina (later replaced by Anastasia Ilyankova) and Aleksandra Shchekoldina. During the all-around final, Melnikova won gold, finishing ahead of Lorette Charpy of France. The following day, Ilyankova had to withdraw from the uneven bars final due to an allergic reaction, and Melnikova replaced her. During the event finals, Melnikova won silver on vault behind Slovenian Teja Belak, gold on uneven bars, and silver on balance beam behind Nina Derwael of Belgium.

On 9 July, it was announced that Melnikova would be featured in a year-long documentary series on the Olympic Channel titled All Around, alongside American Morgan Hurd and Chen Yile of China, which followed their journeys and training leading up to the 2020 Summer Olympics in Tokyo.

In August, Melnikova competed at the Russian Cup. After two days of competition, she placed second in the all-around behind junior national team member Vladislava Urazova. She also won silver on vault, finishing behind Lilia Akhaimova and bronze on uneven bars behind Daria Spiridonova and Urazova. Shortly after the conclusion of the Russian Cup, Melnikova was named to the nominative team for the 2019 World Championships alongside Akhaimova, Spiridonova, Anastasia Agafonova, Angelina Simakova (later replaced by Maria Paseka), and Aleksandra Shchekoldina.

At the World Championships, Melnikova helped Russia qualify for the team final in third place behind the United States and China. Individually, she qualified for the all-around in fourth place behind Simone Biles and Sunisa Lee of the United States and Mélanie de Jesus dos Santos of France, the uneven bars final in eighth place, and the floor exercise final in third place behind Biles and Lee. The Russian team won the silver medal in the team final with Melnikova contributing scores on all four apparatuses. During the all-around final, Melnikova finished with a score of 56.399, earning the bronze medal behind Biles and Tang Xijing of China. This was Melnikova's first individual medal at a World Championships. During the uneven bars final, she performed a clean routine and earned a score of 14.733, finishing fourth behind Nina Derwael of Belgium, Becky Downie of Great Britain, and Lee. The following day, she competed in the floor final and earned the bronze medal behind Biles and Lee.

After the World Championships, Melnikova competed at the Tokyo International Cup in Aichi, Japan where she won gold on vault, uneven bars, and balance beam and placed seventh on floor exercise.

=== 2020 ===
In mid-January, it was announced that Melnikova would compete at the Italian Serie A competition as part of the Lissone LAG club. The LAG club finished ninth at the 1st Italian Serie A. Later that month, it was announced that she would compete at the Stuttgart World Cup taking place in March. The Stuttgart World Cup was canceled in March due to the COVID-19 pandemic in Germany. In late September, it was announced that Melnikova would be competing at an upcoming competition in Hiroshima to take place in November alongside Lilia Akhaimova (later replaced by Aleksandra Shchekoldina), Elena Gerasimova, and Yana Vorona. At the Friendship & Solidarity Meet, she was on the Friendship team, and they placed second. While individual titles were not being contested, Melnikova scored the highest all-around total with 56.700 and recorded the highest uneven bars and floor exercise scores and the second highest vault and balance beam scores behind American Shilese Jones and Zhang Jin of China respectively.

=== 2021 ===
Melnikova competed at the Russian Championships in March. She finished third in the all-around behind new seniors Viktoria Listunova and Vladislava Urazova. During event finals, Melnikova won gold on vault and floor exercise and bronze on uneven bars once again behind Urazova and Listunova. After the Russian Championships, she was selected to compete at the European Championships in Basel alongside Urazova, Listunova, and Elena Gerasimova. At the European Championships, she qualified for the all-around, uneven bars, and floor exercise finals in first place and the vault final in second place behind Jessica Gadirova. During the all-around final, she fell off both the uneven bars and the balance beam but still managed to finish in second place behind Listunova. On the first day of event finals, she won bronze on vault behind Giulia Steingruber and Gadirova and won gold on the uneven bars. On the final day of the competition, she won silver on floor exercise behind Gadirova.

Melnikova competed at the Russian Cup in June. During qualifications, she finished in first place, but during the all-around final, she fell off the balance beam and finish third behind Listunova and Urazova. After the competition, Valentina Rodionenko, the senior coach of the Russian national artistic gymnastics team, announced that Melnikova would be on the Olympic Team along with Listunova, Urazova, and Lilia Akhaimova.

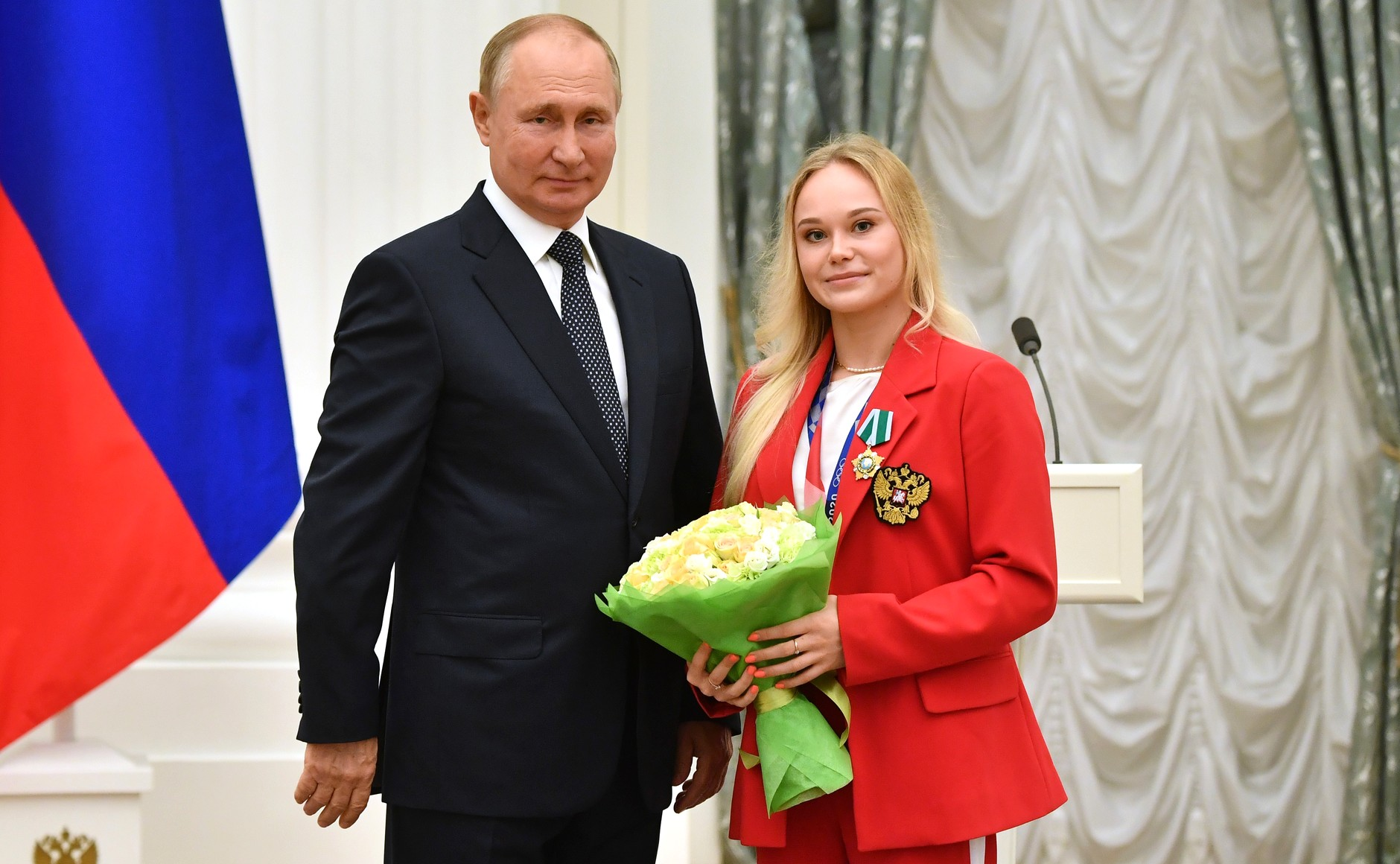
Melnikova receiving state awards from President Vladimir Putin following the 2020 Olympics

At the Olympic Games, Melnikova qualified for the all-around, vault, uneven bars, and floor exercise event finals. Additionally, she helped the Russian Olympic Committee qualify for the team final in a surprise first place, ahead of the United States team. During the team final, Melnikova competed on all four apparatuses. Although Melnikova and teammate Urazova fell off the balance beam, the Russian team performed well on all other routines and finished in first place, over three points ahead of the second-place American team. This marked the first time Russia had won the Olympic team gold, as their previous team titles were accredited to the Soviet Union. (Note: Teams and athletes from Russia competed under the acronym "ROC" at the 2020 Summer Olympics due to doping sanctions against the country.) Additionally, it marked the end of Team USA's decade-long Olympic and World Championships winning streak. During the all-around final, Melnikova hit all four of her routines and finished third behind Sunisa Lee and Rebeca Andrade to earn the bronze medal, her first individual Olympic medal. On the first day of event finals, Melnikova finished fifth on vault and eighth on uneven bars. The following day, she performed a clean routine and won the bronze medal on floor exercise behind Jade Carey and Vanessa Ferrari and tying with Mai Murakami, winning her second individual and fourth overall Olympic medal.

In September, it was announced that Melnikova would compete at the upcoming World Championships alongside Yana Vorona, Maria Minaeva, and Olympic teammate Urazova. While there, she qualified for the all-around final in first place and to all four apparatus finals. She won the gold medal in the all-around, becoming the third Russian woman to do so and the first since Aliya Mustafina did so in 2010. By winning the all-around title Melnikova ended the United States' eleven-year World and Olympic all-around winning streak. Two days after winning the all-around, she won a bronze medal on vault behind Rebeca Andrade and Asia D'Amato. On the final day of competition, she won a silver medal on floor exercise behind Mai Murakami.

Following the World Championships, Melnikova competed at the Arthur Gander Memorial. She won the three-event all-around, finishing over four points ahead of Taïs Boura of France and Ciena Alipio of the United States. She then competed at the Swiss Cup where she was partnered with Nikita Nagornyy. They won the competition ahead of the Ukrainian team of Illia Kovtun and Yelyzaveta Hubareva.

=== 2022–2024 ===
Melnikova did not compete in any international competitions due to the International Gymnastics Federation banning Russian and Belarusian athletes and officials from taking part in FIG-sanctioned competitions due to the Russian invasion of Ukraine. She returned to competition at the 2022 Russian Cup in July. She placed first in the all-around, on vault, and on floor exercise and second on uneven bars and balance beam behind Viktoria Listunova and Yana Vorona, respectively. Then in September, she competed at the Spartakiade in Kazan. She won the silver medal in the all-around behind Listunova. In the event finals, she won gold on floor exercise, silver on vault and balance beam, and bronze on uneven bars. She then won the all-around gold medal at the Voronin Cup.

Melnikova won the silver medal in the all-around at the 2023 Russian Championships behind Viktoria Listunova. In the event finals, she finished fourth on the vault and sixth on the floor exercise. Then at the 2023 Russian Cup, she won the gold medal on vault and the silver medal on floor exercise.

In 2024 Melnikova placed first in the all-around at the Russian Championships; additionally she won gold on vault, balance beam, and floor exercise and bronze on uneven bars. In June she competed at her first multi-sport event since the ban on Russian and Belarusian teams in gymnastics began – the 2024 BRICS Games. At this Russian-hosted competition Melnikova won gold on the uneven bars and silver on vault. Melnikova ended the year competing at the 2024 Voronin Cup where she was a part of the gold medal winning team. Individually she won gold on vault and silver on balance beam; additionally she recorded the third highest all-around score but did not medal due to two-per-country limitations.

=== 2025 ===
In early 2025 Melnikova was granted Authorised Neutral Athletes (AIN) status, allowing her to return to international competition. This designation was opposed by Ukrainian sporting bodies, which contended that her actions have not complied with the listed standards for neutrality, noting Melnikova's political campaign, in which she ran as a non-partisan candidate in the primaries for the country's ruling party, United Russia.

In September, she made her AIN debut at the Paris World Challenge Cup where she qualified to the vault, balance beam, and floor exercise finals. She won gold on balance beam, silver on floor exercise behind Sabrina Voinea, and placed fifth on vault.

Melnikova next competed at the 2025 World Championships, having last competed at the 2021 edition. During the qualification round, she qualified to the all-around and vault finals in first place and to the uneven bars final in third. In the all-around final, Melnikova won gold, earning her second career World all-around title. During event finals, Melnikova won gold on vault and silver on the uneven bars behind Kaylia Nemour.

=== 2026 ===
Melnikova began the 2026 season competing at the Russian Cup where she won bronze in the all-around behind Anna Kalmykova and Liudmila Roshchina and silver on floor exercise behind Roshchina. Melnikova opted to skip competing at the Russian National Championships in order to rest a leg injury. Despite this, she was selected to compete at the 2026 European Championships in Zagreb, Croatia alongside Kalmykova, Roshchina, Viktoria Listunova (replaced by Alyona Glotova), and Elizaveta Us. However, a week before the start of the competition, the Croatian government denied visas for Melnikova as well as Listunova and Kalmykova, preventing them from competing. Days later, after the Russian Ministry of Foreign Affairs worked with the Croatian Gymnastics Union as well as European Gymnastics, Melnikova and Kalmykova were granted visas. In Zagreb, Melnikova won her first women's all-around European title, finishing ahead of her teammate Anna Kalmykova, who took the silver medal. During event finals Melnikova won gold on vault and bronze on balance beam and floor exercise. On the final day of competition, Melnikova helped the Russian team win gold.

Melnikova was selected to represent Russia at the 2026 World Championships. Four days before the official start date of the competition, the Netherlands denied her visa along with those of Kalmykova and Listunova.

== Awards ==
Following the 2016 Olympic Games in Rio de Janeiro, Melnikova received the Order "For Merit to the Fatherland", as well as the title of Honoured Master of Sport in the Russian Federation. At the 2018 World Championships in Doha, Qatar, she was presented with the Longines Prize for Elegance. She received the Order of Friendship after the 2020 Olympic Games.

== Competitive history ==
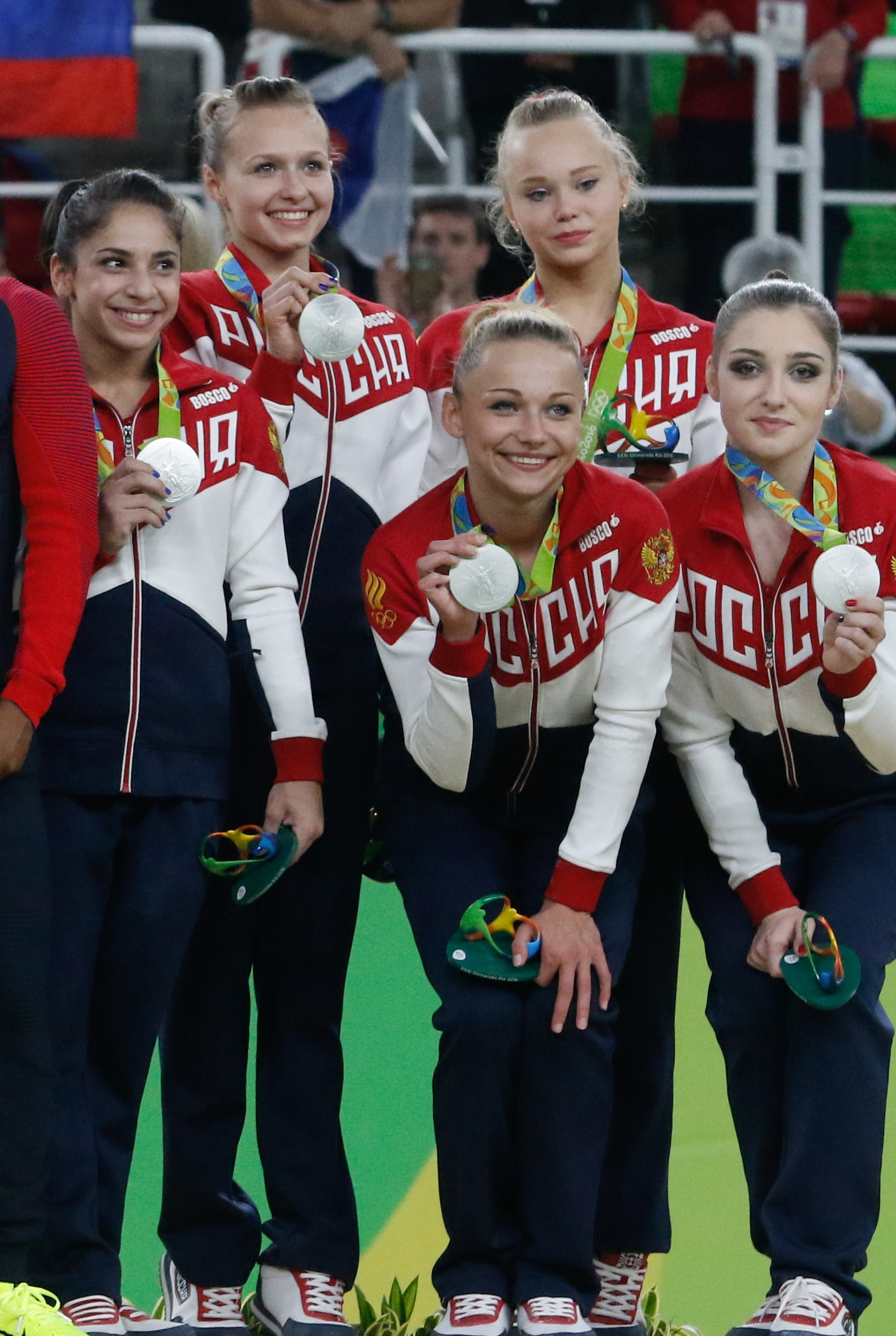
Melnikova and the Russian team with their Olympic silver medals

Competitive history of Angelina Melnikova at the junior level
| Year | Event | Team | AA | VT | UB | BB | FX |
|---|---|---|---|---|---|---|---|
| 2014 | International Gymnix | 1st place, gold medalist(s) | 2nd place, silver medalist(s) | | 2nd place, silver medalist(s) | | 3rd place, bronze medalist(s) |
| 2014 | Russian Championships | 1st place, gold medalist(s) | 1st place, gold medalist(s) | | 7 | 1st place, gold medalist(s) | 1st place, gold medalist(s) |
| 2014 | Junior European Championships | 1st place, gold medalist(s) | 1st place, gold medalist(s) | 6 | 2nd place, silver medalist(s) | 1st place, gold medalist(s) | |
| 2014 | Top Gym | | 1st place, gold medalist(s) | 1st place, gold medalist(s) | 1st place, gold medalist(s) | | |
| 2015 | Russian Championships | 1st place, gold medalist(s) | 2nd place, silver medalist(s) | | 5 | 1st place, gold medalist(s) | 2nd place, silver medalist(s) |
| 2015 | Elite Gym Massilia | 2nd place, silver medalist(s) | 1st place, gold medalist(s) | | 5 | | 6 |
| 2015 | Voronin Cup | 2nd place, silver medalist(s) | 2nd place, silver medalist(s) | 1st place, gold medalist(s) | | | 1st place, gold medalist(s) |

Competitive history of Angelina Melnikova at the senior level
| Year | Event | Team | AA | VT | UB | BB | FX |
|---|---|---|---|---|---|---|---|
| 2016 | DTB Pokal Team Challenge Cup | 1st place, gold medalist(s) | | | | | |
| 2016 | Russian Championships | 1st place, gold medalist(s) | 1st place, gold medalist(s) | | 5 | 1st place, gold medalist(s) | 1st place, gold medalist(s) |
| 2016 | European Championships | 1st place, gold medalist(s) | —N/a | | WD | 5 | |
| 2016 | Russian Cup | 1st place, gold medalist(s) | 1st place, gold medalist(s) | | 2nd place, silver medalist(s) | 1st place, gold medalist(s) | 3rd place, bronze medalist(s) |
| 2016 | Olympic Games | 2nd place, silver medalist(s) | | | | | |
| 2016 | Arthur Gander Memorial | | 1st place, gold medalist(s) | | | | |
| 2016 | Swiss Cup | 3rd place, bronze medalist(s) | | | | | |
| 2017 | Russian Championships | 2nd place, silver medalist(s) | 11 | 3rd place, bronze medalist(s) | | 3rd place, bronze medalist(s) | 8 |
| 2017 | Stuttgart World Cup | | 2nd place, silver medalist(s) | | | | |
| 2017 | City of Jesolo Trophy | 3rd place, bronze medalist(s) | 6 | 3rd place, bronze medalist(s) | | 7 | 3rd place, bronze medalist(s) |
| 2017 | London World Cup | | 5 | | | | |
| 2017 | European Championships | —N/a | | 8 | | | 1st place, gold medalist(s) |
| 2017 | Russian Cup | 3rd place, bronze medalist(s) | 1st place, gold medalist(s) | 3rd place, bronze medalist(s) | 4 | 1st place, gold medalist(s) | 5 |
| 2017 | World Championships | —N/a | 16 | R2 | | | |
| 2017 | Mexican Open | | 3rd place, bronze medalist(s) | | | | |
| 2017 | Voronin Cup | | 1st place, gold medalist(s) | 2nd place, silver medalist(s) | 2nd place, silver medalist(s) | | 8 |
| 2018 | Stuttgart World Cup | | 4 | | | | |
| 2018 | Birmingham World Cup | | 1st place, gold medalist(s) | | | | |
| 2018 | City of Jesolo Trophy | 1st place, gold medalist(s) | 4 | 2nd place, silver medalist(s) | 3rd place, bronze medalist(s) | 3rd place, bronze medalist(s) | 5 |
| 2018 | Russian Championships | 2nd place, silver medalist(s) | 1st place, gold medalist(s) | 2nd place, silver medalist(s) | 1st place, gold medalist(s) | 1st place, gold medalist(s) | 1st place, gold medalist(s) |
| 2018 | Russian Cup | 1st place, gold medalist(s) | 1st place, gold medalist(s) | | 1st place, gold medalist(s) | | |
| 2018 | European Championships | 1st place, gold medalist(s) | —N/a | 2nd place, silver medalist(s) | 3rd place, bronze medalist(s) | | 6 |
| 2018 | World Championships | 2nd place, silver medalist(s) | 5 | R3 | R3 | | 4 |
| 2018 | Arthur Gander Memorial | | 4 | | | | |
| 2018 | Swiss Cup | 2nd place, silver medalist(s) | | | | | |
| 2019 | Russian Championships | 2nd place, silver medalist(s) | 2nd place, silver medalist(s) | 2nd place, silver medalist(s) | 3rd place, bronze medalist(s) | 2nd place, silver medalist(s) | 1st place, gold medalist(s) |
| 2019 | DTB-Pokal Team Challenge | 2nd place, silver medalist(s) | | | | | |
| 2019 | European Championships | —N/a | 3rd place, bronze medalist(s) | 5 | 2nd place, silver medalist(s) | | 3rd place, bronze medalist(s) |
| 2019 | European Games | | 1st place, gold medalist(s) | 2nd place, silver medalist(s) | 1st place, gold medalist(s) | 2nd place, silver medalist(s) | R1 |
| 2019 | Russian Cup | | 2nd place, silver medalist(s) | 2nd place, silver medalist(s) | 3rd place, bronze medalist(s) | | WD |
| 2019 | World Championships | 2nd place, silver medalist(s) | 3rd place, bronze medalist(s) | | 4 | R3 | 3rd place, bronze medalist(s) |
| 2019 | Toyota International | | | 1st place, gold medalist(s) | 1st place, gold medalist(s) | 1st place, gold medalist(s) | 7 |
| 2020 | 1st Italian Serie A | 9 | | | | | |
| 2020 | Friendship & Solidarity Meet | 2nd place, silver medalist(s) | | | | | |
| 2021 | Russian Championships | 4 | 3rd place, bronze medalist(s) | 1st place, gold medalist(s) | 3rd place, bronze medalist(s) | | 1st place, gold medalist(s) |
| 2021 | European Championships | —N/a | 2nd place, silver medalist(s) | 3rd place, bronze medalist(s) | 1st place, gold medalist(s) | | 2nd place, silver medalist(s) |
| 2021 | Russian Cup | | 3rd place, bronze medalist(s) | 2nd place, silver medalist(s) | 2nd place, silver medalist(s) | 3rd place, bronze medalist(s) | 2nd place, silver medalist(s) |
| 2021 | Olympic Games | 1st place, gold medalist(s) | 3rd place, bronze medalist(s) | 5 | 8 | | 3rd place, bronze medalist(s) |
| 2021 | World Championships | —N/a | 1st place, gold medalist(s) | 3rd place, bronze medalist(s) | 4 | 7 | 2nd place, silver medalist(s) |
| 2021 | Arthur Gander Memorial | | 1st place, gold medalist(s) | | | | |
| 2021 | Swiss Cup | 1st place, gold medalist(s) | | | | | |
| 2022 | Russian Cup | | 1st place, gold medalist(s) | 1st place, gold medalist(s) | 2nd place, silver medalist(s) | 2nd place, silver medalist(s) | 1st place, gold medalist(s) |
| 2022 | Spartakiade | 3rd place, bronze medalist(s) | 2nd place, silver medalist(s) | 2nd place, silver medalist(s) | 3rd place, bronze medalist(s) | 2nd place, silver medalist(s) | 1st place, gold medalist(s) |
| 2022 | Voronin Cup | | 1st place, gold medalist(s) | | | | |
| 2023 | Russian Championships | 3rd place, bronze medalist(s) | 2nd place, silver medalist(s) | 4 | | | 6 |
| 2023 | Russian Cup | | 5 | 1st place, gold medalist(s) | 4 | 6 | 2nd place, silver medalist(s) |
| 2024 | Russian Championships | | 1st place, gold medalist(s) | 1st place, gold medalist(s) | 3rd place, bronze medalist(s) | 1st place, gold medalist(s) | 1st place, gold medalist(s) |
| 2024 | BRICS Games | | | 2nd place, silver medalist(s) | 1st place, gold medalist(s) | | |
| 2024 | Voronin Cup | 1st place, gold medalist(s) | | 1st place, gold medalist(s) | | 2nd place, silver medalist(s) | |
| 2025 | Paris World Challenge Cup | | | 5 | | 1st place, gold medalist(s) | 2nd place, silver medalist(s) |
| 2025 | Russian Championships | 1st place, gold medalist(s) | 1st place, gold medalist(s) | 2nd place, silver medalist(s) | 1st place, gold medalist(s) | | 1st place, gold medalist(s) |
| 2025 | World Championships | —N/a | 1st place, gold medalist(s) | 1st place, gold medalist(s) | 2nd place, silver medalist(s) | | |
| 2026 | Russian Cup | 5 | 3rd place, bronze medalist(s) | | 7 | | 2nd place, silver medalist(s) |
| 2026 | European Championships | 1st place, gold medalist(s) | 1st place, gold medalist(s) | 1st place, gold medalist(s) | | 3rd place, bronze medalist(s) | 3rd place, bronze medalist(s) |
