= Anastasia Dmitrieva =

Russian artistic gymnast

- Full name: Anastasia Sergeyevna Dmitrieva
- Nicknames: Stasia, Nastia
- Born: 21 January 1999 (age 27) Tolyatti, Samara, Russia
- Spouse: Dmitriy Lankin (m. 2021)

Gymnastics career
- Discipline: Women's artistic gymnastics
- Country represented: Russia (2012–2016)
- Head coach: Olga Larioshkina
Medal record
Women's artistic gymnastics
Representing Russia
Junior European Championships
Gold medal – first place	2014 Sofia	Team

Anastasia Sergeyevna Dmitrieva (Russian: Анастасия Сергеевна Дмитриева, born 21 January 1999) is a Russian former artistic gymnast. She was a member of the Russian national team from 2012 to 2016 and won a gold medal in the team event at the 2014 Junior European Championships.

== Gymnastics career ==
=== Junior ===
Dmitrieva made her international debut at the International Gymnix in 2012, winning team gold and placing ninth on floor exercise. Then at the 2013 International Gymnix, she tied with teammate Maria Bondareva for the all-around title and helped Russia win the team competition. At the 2013 Lugano Trophy, she won the all-around bronze medal, behind Andreea Munteanu and Bondareva. She won a gold medal with the Russian team at the 2013 Gymnasiade.

At the 2014 Junior Russian Championships, Dmitrieva won a silver medal on the floor exercise and bronze medals on the vault and balance beam. At the Junior European Championships, she competed alongside teammates Angelina Melnikova, Maria Bondareva, Seda Tutkhalyan, and Daria Skrypnik, and they won the gold medal.

=== Senior ===
Dmitrieva became age-eligible for senior competition in 2015. She placed seventh in the all-around at the 2015 Russian Championships. She then competed at a friendly meet against Italy, Romania, and Colombia, and the Russian team won the gold medal. Individually, she won the bronze medal in the all-around behind teammates Seda Tutkhalyan and Angelina Melnikova. She was initially added to the 2015 World Championships team as an alternate after Aliya Mustafina withdrew. However, she was swapped out by the national team head coach for Evgenia Shelgunova. At the 2015 Voronin Cup, she won the all-around silver medal behind teammate Maria Kharenkova. In the event finals, she won a silver medal on the vault and bronze medals on the balance beam and floor exercise.

Dmitrieva competed with the Russian team that won gold at the 2016 DTB Pokal Team Challenge. At the 2016 Russian Championships, she won a bronze medal on the vault. She was not selected for Russia's 2016 Olympic team. At the 2017 Russian Championships, she finished 13th in the all-around, fourth on the vault, and fifth on the balance beam. The 2019 Russian Championships were the final competition of her career.

== Personal life ==
Dmitrieva married fellow Russian artistic gymnast Dmitriy Lankin in 2021.

== Competitive history ==
Year	Event	Team	AA	VT	UB	BB	FX
2012	L'International Gymnix (Junior International Cup)	1st place, gold medalist(s)					
2013	L'International Gymnix (Junior International Cup)	1st place, gold medalist(s)	1st place, gold medalist(s)	4	3rd place, bronze medalist(s)		5
2013	National Championships (Junior) (CMS)	2nd place, silver medalist(s)	2nd place, silver medalist(s)	2nd place, silver medalist(s)	4	1st place, gold medalist(s)	
2013	10 Lugano Trophy		3rd place, bronze medalist(s)				
2013	Gymnasiade	1st place, gold medalist(s)					
2014	National Championships (Junior) (MS)	3rd place, bronze medalist(s)	5	3rd place, bronze medalist(s)	8	3rd place, bronze medalist(s)	2nd place, silver medalist(s)
2014	European Championships (Junior)	1st place, gold medalist(s)					6
2014	Top Gym		8			4	7
2015	National Championships	3rd place, bronze medalist(s)	7	6			4
2015	ITA-RUS-ROU-COL Friendly	1st place, gold medalist(s)	3rd place, bronze medalist(s)				
2015	Rusudan Sikharulidze tournament					2nd place, silver medalist(s)	2nd place, silver medalist(s)
2015	Russian Cup	4	6	5		6	
2015	Arthur Gander Memorial		4				
2015	Voronin Cup	2nd place, silver medalist(s)	2nd place, silver medalist(s)			3rd place, bronze medalist(s)	3rd place, bronze medalist(s)
2016	DTB Pokal Team Challenge Cup	1st place, gold medalist(s)					
2016	National Championships	3rd place, bronze medalist(s)	9	3rd place, bronze medalist(s)			6
2016	Russian Cup	2nd place, silver medalist(s)	20	4		7	7
2017	National Championships	4	13	4		5	
