= Ivan Gerget =

Russian gymnast (born 2002)

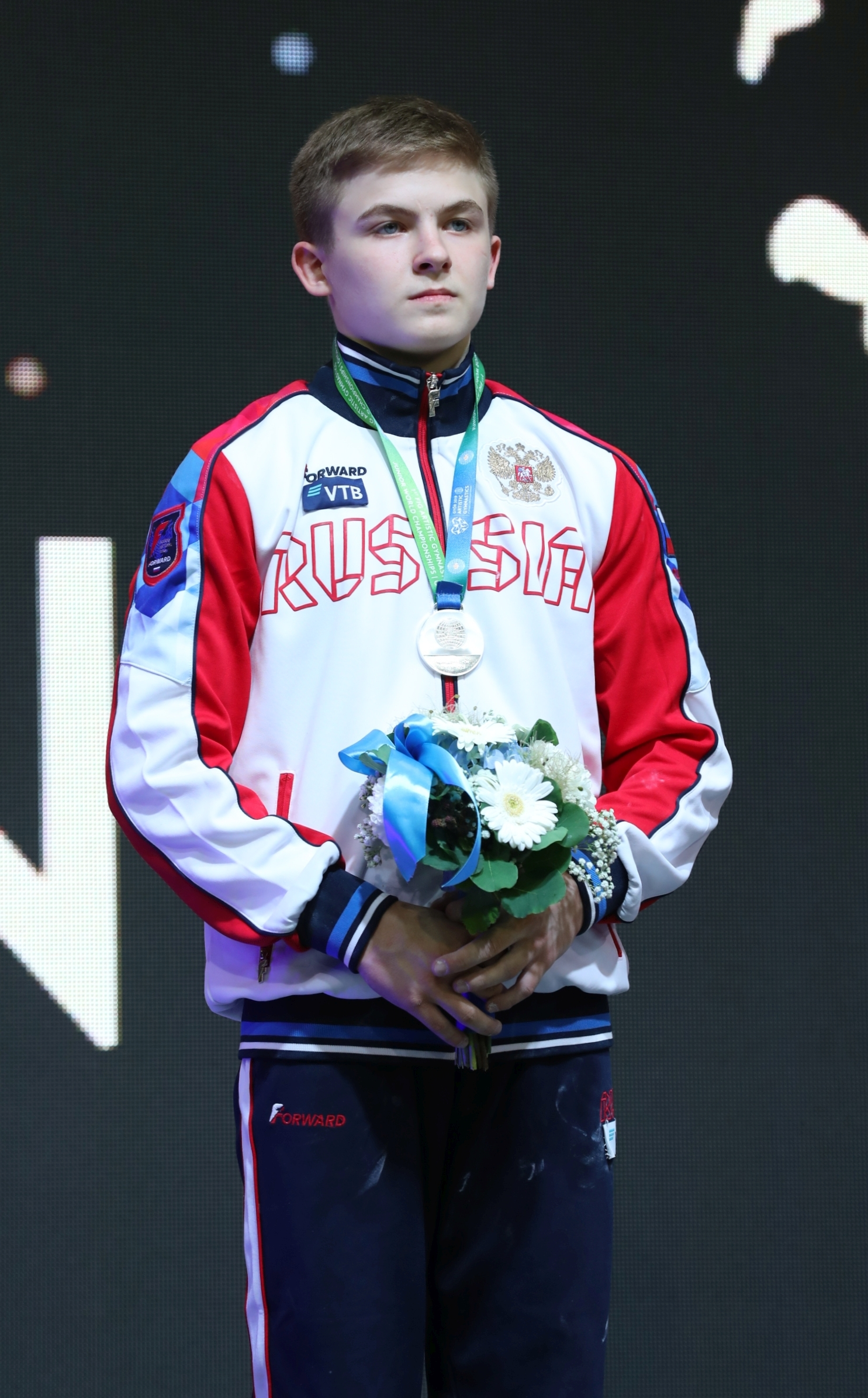
- Ivan Gerget in 2019

Personal information
- Full name: Ivan Sergeyevich Gerget
- Nickname: Vancho
- Born: 6 March 2002 (age 24)

Gymnastics career
- Discipline: Men's artistic gymnastics
- Country represented: Russia (2018–present)
- Club: Mametiev School of Gymnastics and Sports
- Head coach: I.S. Maltsev
Medal record
Representing Russia
Men's artistic gymnastics
Junior World Championships
Silver medal – second place	2019 Győr	Horizontal bar

Ivan Sergeyevich Gerget (Russian: Иван Сергеевич Гергет; born 6 March 2002) is a Russian artistic gymnast. He won the silver medal in the horizontal bar at the 2019 Junior World Artistic Gymnastics Championships held in Győr, Hungary.

In 2019, he won the silver medal in the men's all-around event at the 2019 Russian Junior Artistic Gymnastics Championships held in Penza, Russia.

== Competitive history ==
Year	Event	Team	AA	FX	PH	SR	VT	PB	HB
Junior
2017
2017	Siberia Federal Championships	3rd place, bronze medalist(s)	4	1st place, gold medalist(s)	1st place, gold medalist(s)		1st place, gold medalist(s)	1st place, gold medalist(s)	1st place, gold medalist(s)
2017	Russian Junior Championships		15				8		
2017	Voronin Junior Cup		32						
2018
2018	Siberia Federal Championships		2nd place, silver medalist(s)	2nd place, silver medalist(s)		3rd place, bronze medalist(s)	3rd place, bronze medalist(s)		1st place, gold medalist(s)
2018	Summer Youth Spartakiad		20						8
2018	Russian Junior Championships		13						
2018	Voronin Junior Cup		11						
2019
2019	Hope of Russia		7						
2019	International Junior Team Cup	2nd place, silver medalist(s)	12						
2019	Russian Junior Championships		2nd place, silver medalist(s)	7	3rd place, bronze medalist(s)	2nd place, silver medalist(s)			8
2019	Memorial Erminio Vosconti	1st place, gold medalist(s)							
2019	Junior World Championships	9	24						2nd place, silver medalist(s)
Senior
2020
2020	Siberia Federal Championships		2nd place, silver medalist(s)	8	4				3rd place, bronze medalist(s)
2020	National Championships	2nd place, silver medalist(s)	12					7	3rd place, bronze medalist(s)
2021
2021	Russian Cup							5	
2021	Cup of Siberia		3rd place, bronze medalist(s)		3rd place, bronze medalist(s)	2nd place, silver medalist(s)		3rd place, bronze medalist(s)	1st place, gold medalist(s)
2022
2022	National Championships	4	6						8
2022	Russian Cup		8						11
2022	Spartakiad	8	14						6
2022	Tournament for the prizes of YP and IS		3rd place, bronze medalist(s)	2nd place, silver medalist(s)		2nd place, silver medalist(s)	1st place, gold medalist(s)	1st place, gold medalist(s)	1st place, gold medalist(s)
