= 2015 Voronin Cup =

Mikhail Voronin Cup
- Location: Moscow, Russia
- Date: December 15–16, 2015

The 2015 Voronin Cup took place on December 15-16 in Moscow, Russia.

== Medal winners ==
Event	Gold	Silver	Bronze
Team	Russia; Maria Kharenkova; Angelina Melnikova	Russia (Dynamo); Natalia Kapitonova; Daria Skrypnik	Japan; Wakana Inoue; Hitomi Hatakeda
Senior
All-Around	Maria Kharenkova (RUS)	Anastasia Dmitrieva (RUS)	Wakana Inoue (JPN)
Vault	Alla Sosnitskaya (RUS)	Anastasia Dmitrieva (RUS)	Valeriya Tsekhmistrenka (BLR)
Uneven Bars	Maria Kharenkova (RUS)	Yurika Yumoto (JPN)	Evgeniya Shelgunova (RUS)
Balance Beam	Maria Kharenkova (RUS)	Wakana Inoue (JPN)	Anastasia Dmitrieva (RUS)
Floor Exercise	Seda Tutkhalyan (RUS)	Wakana Inoue (JPN)	Anastasia Dmitrieva (RUS)
Junior
All-Around	Natalia Kapitonova (RUS)	Angelina Melnikova (RUS)	Natsumi Hanashima (JPN)
Vault	Angelina Melnikova (RUS)	Natsumi Hanashima (JPN)	Viktoria Gorbatova (RUS)
Uneven Bars	Natalia Kapitonova (RUS)	Uliana Perebinosova (RUS)	Natsumi Hanashima (JPN)
Balance Beam	Natalia Kapitonova (RUS)	Natsumi Hanashima (JPN)	Hitomi Hatakeda (JPN)
Floor Exercise	Angelina Melnikova (RUS)	Natalia Kapitonova (RUS)	Hitomi Hatakeda (JPN)

== Senior Result ==
=== All-Around ===
Position	Gymnast	Vault (gymnastics)	Uneven bars	Balance beam	Floor (gymnastics)	Total
1st place, gold medalist(s)	Maria Kharenkova (RUS)	14.250	14.350	14.750	13.650	57.000
2nd place, silver medalist(s)	Anastasia Dmitrieva (RUS)	14.450	12.900	14.950	14.150	56.450
	Evgeniya Shelgunova (RUS)	13.950	14.300	14.700	13.000	55.950
	Polina Fedorova (RUS)	13.600	13.700	14.500	13.800	55.600
3rd place, bronze medalist(s)	Wakana Inoue (JPN)	13.650	12.300	13.950	13.700	53.600
4	Vera Van Pol (NED)	13.700	13.050	12.800	13.700	53.250
	Alla Sosnitskaya (RUS)	14.350	12.550	12.900	13.500	53.000
5	Yurika Yumoto (JPN)	14.050	13.000	12.750	12.900	52.700
	Daria Elizarova (RUS)	13.200	13.000	13.200	12.550	51.950
6	Irina Sazonova (ISL)	13.950	12.450	13.200	12.300	51.900
7	Yulia Inshina (AZE)	13.000	12.500	13.800	12.050	51.350
	Ksenia Artemova (RUS)	13.350	11.650	12.650	12.400	50.050
8	Dominiqua Belanyi (ISL)	13.150	11.600	11.700	12.600	49.050
9	Isa Maassen (NED)	14.150	10.250	11.250	13.050	48.700
10	Valeriya Tsekhmistrenka (BLR)	12.900	9.850	12.250	13.050	48.050
11	Aleksandra Rajcic (SRB)	12.800	12.600	10.500	11.900	47.800
12	Ominakhon Khalilova (UZB)	13.000	9.050	12.500	13.100	47.650
13	Aliaksandra Koshaleva (BLR)	12.600	9.300	13.400	12.250	47.550
	Ksenia Moloshevenka (RUS)	12.600	9.350	11.900	13.000	46.850
14	Saga Svantesson (SWE)	12.050	10.200	11.400	12.700	46.350
	Margarita Varnakova (RUS)	13.150	8.150	13.900	10.850	46.050
	Seda Tutkhalian (RUS)	0.000	13.300	14.050	14.200	41.550

=== Vault ===
Rank	Gymnast	Score
1st place, gold medalist(s)	Alla Sosnitskaya (RUS)	14.416
2nd place, silver medalist(s)	Anastasia Dmitrieva (RUS)	14.349
3rd place, bronze medalist(s)	Valeriya Tsekhmistrenka (BLR)	12.849
4	Ominakhon Khalilova (UZB)	6.300

=== Uneven Bars ===
Rank	Gymnast	Score
1st place, gold medalist(s)	Maria Kharenkova (RUS)	14.000
2nd place, silver medalist(s)	Yurika Yumoto (JPN)	13.466
3rd place, bronze medalist(s)	Evgeniya Shelgunova (RUS)	12.966
4	Vera Van Pol (NED)	12.633
5	Aleksandra Rajcic (SRB)	12.500
6	Irina Sazonova (ISL)	12.300
7	Yulia Inshina (AZE)	10.733
8	Kristina Pravdina (AZE)	10.666

=== Balance Beam ===
Rank	Gymnast	Score
1st place, gold medalist(s)	Maria Kharenkova (RUS)	15.166
2nd place, silver medalist(s)	Wakana Inoue (JPN)	14.466
3rd place, bronze medalist(s)	Anastasia Dmitrieva (RUS)	13.766
4	Vera Van Pol (NED)	13.300
5	Yurika Yumoto (JPN)	13.300
6	Yulia Inshina (AZE)	13.266
7	Aliaksandra Koshaleva (BLR)	12.400
8	Irina Sazonova (ISL)	12.033

=== Floor Exercise ===
Rank	Gymnast	Score
1st place, gold medalist(s)	Seda Tutkhalian (RUS)	14.133
2nd place, silver medalist(s)	Wakana Inoue (JPN)	13.966
3rd place, bronze medalist(s)	Anastasia Dmitrieva (RUS)	13.833
4	Vera Van Pol (NED)	13.600
5	Ominakhon Khalilova (UZB)	13.033
6	Valeriya Tsekhmistrenka (BLR)	12.966
7	Isa Maassen (NED)	12.900
8	Yurika Yumoto (JPN)	11.466

== Junior Result ==
=== All-Around ===
Position	Gymnast	Vault (gymnastics)	Uneven bars	Balance beam	Floor (gymnastics)	Total
1st place, gold medalist(s)	Natalia Kapitonova (RUS)	13.950	15.400	14.750	14.050	58.150
2nd place, silver medalist(s)	Angelina Melnikova (RUS)	14.600	13.550	14.550	14.050	56.750
	Daria Skrypnik (RUS)	13.950	13.750	14.400	13.750	55.850
3rd place, bronze medalist(s)	Natsumi Hanashima (JPN)	13.900	13.900	14.100	13.400	55.300
	Uliana Perebinosova (RUS)	13.100	14.150	13.950	13.550	54.750
4	Hitomi Hatakeda (JPN)	14.150	12.200	13.550	12.900	52.800
	Varvara Zubova (RUS)	13.300	11.950	14.300	13.200	52.750
	Viktoria Gorbatova (RUS)	14.050	12.000	12.650	13.700	52.400
	Ksenia Klimenko (RUS)	12.750	12.150	13.350	12.700	50.950
5	Andela Durdevic (SRB)	12.750	11.150	13.150	13.000	50.050
6	Sanna Veerman (NED)	13.400	12.050	11.550	12.850	49.850
7	Anastasiya Harodnaya (BLR)	13.400	10.200	11.350	12.500	47.450
8	Maria Lastovskaya (BLR)	12.850	10.200	12.400	11.800	47.250
9	Dejana Kuzmanovic (SRB)	12.800	10.250	10.450	12.100	45.600
10	Ana Cernenchi (MDA)	12.400	8.100	11.350	11.050	42.900

=== Vault ===
Rank	Gymnast	Score
1st place, gold medalist(s)	Angelina Melnikova (RUS)	14.716
2nd place, silver medalist(s)	Natsumi Hanashima (JPN)	14.250
3rd place, bronze medalist(s)	Viktoria Gorbatova (RUS)	13.766
4	Sanna Veerman (NED)	13.550
5	Hitomi Hatakeda (JPN)	13.500
6	Andela Durdevic (SRB)	13.217
7	Anastasiya Harodnaya (BLR)	12.733
8	Dejana Kuzmanovic (SRB)	12.217

=== Uneven Bars ===
Rank	Gymnast	Score
1st place, gold medalist(s)	Natalia Kapitonova (RUS)	15.066
2nd place, silver medalist(s)	Uliana Perebinosova (RUS)	13.766
3rd place, bronze medalist(s)	Natsumi Hanashima (JPN)	13.666
4	Hitomi Hatakeda (JPN)	13.000
5	Polina Borzykh (GEO)	12.000
6	Sanna Veerman (NED)	11.066
7	Andela Durdevic (SRB)	10.866
8	Dejana Kuzmanovic (SRB)	9.700

=== Balance Beam ===
Rank	Gymnast	Score
1st place, gold medalist(s)	Natalia Kapitonova (RUS)	13.866
2nd place, silver medalist(s)	Natsumi Hanashima (JPN)	13.500
3rd place, bronze medalist(s)	Hitomi Hatakeda (JPN)	13.466
4	Sanna Veerman (NED)	12.700
5	Maria Lastovskaya (BLR)	12.566
6	Angelina Melnikova (RUS)	12.066
7	Andela Durdevic (SRB)	9.466
8	Ana Cernenchi (MDA)	8.800

=== Floor Exercise ===
Rank	Gymnast	Score
1st place, gold medalist(s)	Angelina Melnikova (RUS)	14.066
2nd place, silver medalist(s)	Natalia Kapitonova (RUS)	13.766
3rd place, bronze medalist(s)	Hitomi Hatakeda (JPN)	13.733
4	Natsumi Hanashima (JPN)	13.266
5	Andela Durdevic (SRB)	12.500
6	Sanna Veerman (NED)	12.333
7	Anastasiya Harodnaya (BLR)	11.600
8	Dejana Kuzmanovic (SRB)	11.533
