= Lugano Trophy =

Lugano Trophy may refer to:

- Memorial Mario Albisetti, annual racewalking competition, also known as the Lugano Trophy and GP Città di Lugano
- Lugano Trophy (World Race Walking Cup), World Race Walking Cup team ranking from 1961 to 1997
- 10th Lugano Trophy, a gymnastics junior competition
