= 10th Lugano Trophy =

The 10th Lugano Trophy was a junior competition held in Lugano, Switzerland on May 18, 2013. The men's all-around winner was Christian Baumann of Switzerland and the women's all around winner was Andreea Munteanu of Romania.

== Medal winners ==
Event	Gold	Silver	Bronze
Men's Individual all-around	Christian Baumann (SUI)	Valentin Starikov (RUS)	Benjamin Gischard (SUI)
Women's Individual all-around	Andreea Munteanu (ROU)	Maria Bondareva (RUS)	Anastasia Dmitrieva (RUS)

=== Women's Individual all-around ===
Position	Gymnast	Vault (gymnastics)	Uneven bars	Balance beam	Floor (gymnastics)	Total
1st place, gold medalist(s)	Andreea Munteanu (ROU)	14.300	13.350	13.850	14.100	55.600
2nd place, silver medalist(s)	Maria Bondareva (RUS)	13.800	13.500	13.200	13.650	54.150
3rd place, bronze medalist(s)	Anastasia Dmitrieva (RUS)	14.050	13.150	13.200	13.700	54.100
4	Sofia Busato (ITA)	14.250	13.150	12.850	13.300	53.550
5	Pilar Rubagotti (ITA)	13.600	12.900	13.200	13.500	53.200
6	Viktoria Kuzmina (RUS)	13.150	13.150	13.450	13.400	53.150
7	Laura Jurca (ROU)	13.950	12.400	12.950	12.400	51.750
8	Stefanie Siegenthaler (SUI)	13.400	11.500	12.450	12.050	49.400
9	Gaia Nesurini (SUI)	12.750	11.400	12.800	11.450	48.400
10	Jessica Stabinger (AUT)	13.550	11.500	10.200	12.650	47.900
11	Ana Palacios (ESP)	12.650	10.750	11.600	12.600	47.600
12	Ace Ayan (SWE)	13.250	10.200	11.300	12.550	47.300
13	Laura Gamell Villa (ESP)	13.250	10.450	11.350	12.000	47.050
14	Yuliya Khramiankova (BLR)	12.850	9.200	10.700	12.000	44.750
15	Sofia Malmgren (SWE)	10.950	9.050	12.000	11.550	43.550
16	Ceyda Sirbu (AUT)	12.550	8.100	10.550	11.450	42.650
17	Dayana Hryhoryeva (BLR)		11.200	11.300		22.500
