= Daria Skrypnik =

Russian artistic gymnast

- Full name: Daria Sergeyevna Skrypnik
- Nickname: Dasha
- Born: 4 October 2000 (age 25) Krasnodar, Russia

Gymnastics career
- Discipline: Women's artistic gymnastics
- Country represented: Russia (2014–2017)
- Head coach: Marina Pletinetskaya
Medal record
Representing Russia
Junior European Championships
Gold medal – first place	2014 Sofia	Team
Gold medal – first place	2014 Sofia	Uneven bars
FIG World Cup
Event / 1st / 2nd / 3rd; Apparatus World Cup / 1 / 0 / 0

Daria Sergeyevna Skrypnik (Russian: Дарья Сергеевна Скрыпник, born 4 October 2000) is a Russian former artistic gymnast. She is the 2014 Junior European uneven bars and team champion. She is also the 2015 European Youth Olympic Festival and 2015 Russian junior national all-around and uneven bars champion.

== Junior gymnastics career ==
Skrypnik made her international debut at the 2014 International Gymnix and won a gold medal in the team event alongside Angelina Melnikova, Anastasia Ilyankova, and Ekaterina Sokova. Individually, she placed fourth in the all-around and eighth in the floor exercise final. She won the silver medal in the vault final, behind Shallon Olsen, and the gold medal in the uneven bars final. She then won the uneven bars title at the Junior Russian Championships. At the Junior European Championships, she competed alongside teammates Melnikova, Maria Bondareva, Seda Tutkhalyan, and Anastasia Dmitrieva, and they won the gold medal. She then won another gold medal in the uneven bars final. She finished the season at the 2014 Voronin Cup with silver medals in both the all-around and the uneven bars.

Skrypnik began the season by winning the junior all-around title at the 2015 Russian Championships. She won another gold medal in the uneven bars final and a bronze medal in the floor exercise final. At the European Youth Olympic Festival, she won a team gold medal alongside Anastasia Ilyankova and Elena Eremina. She also won a gold medal in the all-around final. Then in the event finals, she won a gold medal on the uneven bars, silver medals on the vault and floor exercise, and a bronze medal on the balance beam. Then at the Voronin Cup in December, she won a silver medal with teammate Natalia Kapitonova.

== Senior gymnastics career ==
Skrypnik became age-eligible to compete at the senior level in 2016. At the 2016 Russian Championships, she won the uneven bars title. Additionally, she placed fourth in the all-around and seventh on both the balance beam and floor exercise. She then competed at the 2016 Varna World Challenge Cup and won the gold medal on the uneven bars. She was not selected for Russia's 2016 Olympic team.

Skrypnik won a bronze medal on the uneven bars at the 2017 Russian Championships, behind Natalia Kapitonova and Daria Spiridonova. She finished 18th in the all-around at the 2018 Russian Championships after falling five times. She only competed on the balance beam at the 2019 Russian Championships and finished sixth. At the 2020 Russian Championships, she finished eighth in the all-around and sixth in both the vault and floor exercise finals. She placed 19th in the all-around at the 2021 Russian Championships. She stopped competing after 2021.

== Personal life ==
Skrypnik worked as a stunt double for Kristina Asmus in the film The Champions: Faster. Higher. Stronger in the portrayal of Svetlana Khorkina.

== Competitive history ==
Year	Event	Team	AA	VT	UB	BB	FX
2013	National Championships (Junior) (CMS)	4th	8th	3rd	2nd	3rd	
2013	Russian Hopes (CMS)		1st		1st	1st	1st
2014	L'International Gymnix (Junior International Cup)	1st	4th	2nd	1st		8th
2014	National Championships (Junior) (MS)	5th			1st	4th	
2014	European Championships (Junior)	1st			1st		
2014	Black Sea (00-01)		2nd		1st	1st	
2014	Russian Hopes (MS)	2nd	2nd		1st	1st	7th
2014	Voronin Cup (Junior)		2nd		2nd		
2015	National Championships (Junior) (MS)	7th	1st		1st	8th	3rd
2015	Open Georgia Championships		1st		1st	1st	
2015	Student Spartakiada		2nd		4th	2nd	7th
2015	European Youth Olympic Festival	1st	1st	2nd	1st	3rd	2nd
2015	Elite Gym Massilia	2nd	12th				
2015	Voronin Cup (Junior)	2nd					
2016	National Championships	5th	4th		1st	7th	7th
2016	Varna World Cup				1st		
2016	Russian Cup	5th	6th		6th		8th
2017	National Championships	5th	9th		3rd		
