= Zlata Osokina =

Russian artistic gymnast

- Born: September 22, 2008 (age 18)

Gymnastics career
- Discipline: Women's artistic gymnastics
- Country represented: Russia

Zlata Osokina (Russian: Злата Сергеевна Осокина; born 22 September 2008) is a Russian artistic gymnast.

== Career ==
=== 2021 ===
At the 2021 Russian Junior Artistic Gymnastics Championships, she won silver in the all-around.

=== 2023 ===
In May 2023, she won four medals at the Russian Junior Artistic Gymnastics Championships: gold in the all-around and on vault, silver on floor, and bronze on uneven bars.

=== 2026 ===
She will be an alternate for the Russian team at the 2026 World Championships.
