= 2016 Russian Artistic Gymnastics Championships =

Gymnastics competition in Russia

Russian Artistic Gymnastics Championships
- Location: Penza, Russia
- Date: March 28 – April 10, 2016

The 2016 Russian Artistic Gymnastics Championships was held in Penza, Russia between 28 March - 10 April 2016.

== Medalists ==
Event	Gold	Silver	Bronze
Men
Team	Volga Federal District; Valentin Starikov; Ivan Tikhonov; Andrei Makolov; Vladislav Polyashov; Denis Ablyazin; David Belyavskiy	Siberian Federal District; Kirill Potapov; Nikita Ignatyev; Grigori Zyryanov; Andrei Lagutov; Daniil Kazachkov; Ivan Stretovich	Moscow; Emin Garibov; Artur Dalaloyan; Alexei Kosyanov; Dmitrii Lankin; Nikita Nagornyy; Aleksandr Sychugov
All-Around	Nikolai Kuksenkov	Nikita Nagornyy	David Belyavskiy
Floor	Nikita Nagornyy	Denis Ablyazin	Kirill Prokopyev
Pommel horse	Sergei Eltsov	David Belyavskiy	Andrei Perevoznikov
Rings	Denis Ablyazin	Nikita Nagornyy	Nikita Ignatyev
Vault	Denis Ablyazin	Nikita Nagornyy	Artur Dalaloyan
Parallel bars	David Belyavskiy	Vladislav Polyashov; Nikita Nagornyy	N/A
Horizontal bar	Sergei Eltsov	Ivan Stretovich	Nikita Ignatyev
Women
Team	Central Federal District; Angelina Melnikova; Darya Elizarova; Kristina Kiseler; Evgeniya Shelgunova; Ksenia Afanasyeva; Maria Kharenkova	Moscow; Aliya Mustafina; Alla Sosnitskaya; Daria Spiridonova; Seda Tutkhalyan; Viktoria Kuzmina; Ksenia Artyomova	Volga Federal District; Polina Fedorova; Anastasia Dmitrieva; Natalia Kapitonova; Olga Bikmurzina; Ksenia Sabaldash; Daria Lopatina
All-around	Angelina Melnikova	Seda Tutkhalyan	Maria Kharenkova
Vault	Seda Tutkhalyan	Tatiana Nabieva	Anastasia Dmitrieva
Uneven bars	Daria Skrypnik; Daria Spiridonova	N/A	Aliya Mustafina
Balance beam	Angelina Melnikova	Maria Kharenkova	Aliya Mustafina
Floor	Ksenia Afanasyeva; Angelina Melnikova	N/A	Maria Kharenkova

== European Championships Selection ==
	Senior WAG
1	Aliya Mustafina
2	Angelina Melnikova
3	Seda Tutkhalyan
4	Ksenia Afanasyeva
5	Daria Spiridonova

	Senior MAG
1	Denis Ablyazin
2	David Belyavskiy
3	Nikolai Kuksenkov
4	Nikita Ignatyev
5	Nikita Nagornyy

== Meldonium Incident ==
On Saturday, April 2, new national champion Nikolai Kuksenkov was suspended from the Russian men's championships in Penza after it was revealed he tested positive for the banned substance meldonium. On Friday, April 15, the Russian Anti-Doping Agency notified the Russian Gymnastics Federation that it had officially lifted Kuksenkov's suspension, formally allowing him to return to competition. The news came after the World Anti-Doping Agency (WADA) admitted that "there is currently limited data available" on how long meldonium stays in the system after use.
