= Nikita Ignatyev =

Russian artistic gymnast

- Full name: Nikita Alekseevich Ignatyev
- Born: June 21, 1992 (age 34) Novosibirsk, Novosibirsk Oblast, Russia
- Height: 168 cm (5 ft 6 in)

Gymnastics career
- Discipline: Men's artistic gymnastics
- Country represented: Russia (2010–2022)
- Club: Dynamo Moscow
- Retired: 2 July 2023
Medal record
Representing Russia
European Games
Gold medal – first place	2015 Baku	Team
Silver medal – second place	2015 Baku	Rings
Bronze medal – third place	2015 Baku	All-Around
Bronze medal – third place	2015 Baku	Horizontal Bar
European Championships
Gold medal – first place	2014 Sofia	Team
Gold medal – first place	2016 Bern	Team
Summer Universiade
Gold medal – first place	2013 Kazan	Team

Nikita Alekseevich Ignatyev (Russian: Никита Алексеевич Игнатьев, born 21 June 1992 in Novosibirsk, Novosibirsk Oblast, Russia) is a retired Russian artistic gymnast. He is the 2015 European Games All-around bronze medalist.

== Competitive history ==
Year	Event	Team	AA	FX	PH	SR	VT	PB	HB
2008	Voronin Junior Cup		2nd place, silver medalist(s)			2nd place, silver medalist(s)		1st place, gold medalist(s)	2nd place, silver medalist(s)
2010	Russian Cup		20						
2010	World Championships					11			
2010	Voronin Cup		8						
2011	National Championships	2nd place, silver medalist(s)	3rd place, bronze medalist(s)			4		1st place, gold medalist(s)	3rd place, bronze medalist(s)
2011	Russian Cup	3rd place, bronze medalist(s)	3rd place, bronze medalist(s)	4	5	2nd place, silver medalist(s)		1st place, gold medalist(s)	6
2011	European Championships		5						
2012	National Championships	1st place, gold medalist(s)	1st place, gold medalist(s)						
2012	Russian Cup	1st place, gold medalist(s)	6	1st place, gold medalist(s)	5	4		3rd place, bronze medalist(s)	1st place, gold medalist(s)
2013	National Championships		2nd place, silver medalist(s)			3rd place, bronze medalist(s)			2nd place, silver medalist(s)
2013	European Championships		10						
2013	Universiade	1st place, gold medalist(s)				5			
2014
2014	European Championships	1st place, gold medalist(s)							
2014	Russian Cup	2nd place, silver medalist(s)	1st place, gold medalist(s)	4	8	3rd place, bronze medalist(s)		2nd place, silver medalist(s)	1st place, gold medalist(s)
2014	World Championships	5	26	16	140	8		44	165
2014	Swiss Cup	1st place, gold medalist(s)							
2014	Arthur Gander Memorial		3rd place, bronze medalist(s)						
2015
2015	World Championships	4	24	40	152	15	41	136	16
2015	National Championships	5	3rd place, bronze medalist(s)	5		5			
2015	Russian Cup	1st place, gold medalist(s)	1st place, gold medalist(s)	3rd place, bronze medalist(s)	3rd place, bronze medalist(s)	2nd place, silver medalist(s)		2nd place, silver medalist(s)	1st place, gold medalist(s)
2015	European Games	1st place, gold medalist(s)	3rd place, bronze medalist(s)		10	2nd place, silver medalist(s)		8	3rd place, bronze medalist(s)
2016	National Championships	2nd place, silver medalist(s)				3rd place, bronze medalist(s)			3rd place, bronze medalist(s)
2016	European Championships	1st place, gold medalist(s)							
2016	Swiss Cup	3rd place, bronze medalist(s)							
2016	Arthur Gander Memorial		10						
2016	Toyota International				4	2nd place, silver medalist(s)		4	1st place, gold medalist(s)
2017	Stuttgart World Cup		4	1st place, gold medalist(s)		1st place, gold medalist(s)			1st place, gold medalist(s)
2017	European Championships		4	51	53	14		12	10
2017	National Championships	3rd place, bronze medalist(s)	2nd place, silver medalist(s)			2nd place, silver medalist(s)			
2017	Voronin Cup		2nd place, silver medalist(s)		5				
2018	DTB Team Challenge	1st place, gold medalist(s)	42	2nd place, silver medalist(s)			2nd place, silver medalist(s)		
2018	Voronin Cup		4						
2019	National Championships		3rd place, bronze medalist(s)	4	6	3rd place, bronze medalist(s)		3rd place, bronze medalist(s)	2nd place, silver medalist(s)
2019	DTB Team Challenge	1st place, gold medalist(s)	1st place, gold medalist(s)			3rd place, bronze medalist(s)			
2019	Russian Cup		7		5				
2021	National Championships	4	4		3rd place, bronze medalist(s)	4		6	8
2021	Russian Cup		3rd place, bronze medalist(s)			5		6	6
2021	World Championships		17						

== Career ==
Ignatyev has started gymnastics since 1997. In 2003 he moved to the town of Leninsk-Kuznetsky, training in the sports school for gymnastics. In 2010 he attended the Kuzbass State Pedagogical Academy and selected to be with the Russian team for men's artistic gymnastics. He won the all-around at the 28th Gander Memorial in Morges, Switzerland.

In 2012, Ignatyev was not selected to compete but was an alternate for the Russian men's team for the 2012 London Olympics.

In 2013, Ignatyev, alongside the Russian team (Nikolai Kuksenkov, Emin Garibov, Denis Ablyazin and David Belyavskiy) won Russia the team gold at the 2013 Summer Universiade in Kazan.

On May 19–25, 2014, at the 2014 European Championships in Sofia. Ignatyev along with teammates (Denis Ablyazin, Aleksandr Balandin, David Belyavskiy, Nikolai Kuksenkov) won Russia the Team Event gold medal with a total score of 267.959 ahead of Great Britain. At the 2014 World Championships in Nanning, Ignatyev also competed along teammates (Denis Ablyazin, David Belyavskiy, Nikolai Kuksenkov, Daniil Kazachkov and Ivan Stretovich) with Team Russia finishing 5th in the Team Final.

In June 2015, Ignatyev competed in the 2015 European Games, winning gold in the Team Competition (with teammates David Belyavskiy and Nikolai Kuksenkov). He qualified for the all-around ahead of teammate Nikolai Kuksenkov and won the all-around bronze. In apparatus finals, he won silver in Rings and silver in Horizontal Bar. He became the all-around champion at the Russian Cup in September.

Ignatyev was member the Russian men competing at the 2015 World Championships in Glasgow, together with teammates (Denis Ablyazin, Ivan Stretovich, Nikolai Kuksenkov, Nikita Nagornyy and David Belyavskiy)

On May 25–29, Ignatyev (together with David Belyavskiy, Denis Ablyazin, Nikolai Kuksenkov and Nikita Nagornyy) won Russia the Team gold at the 2016 European Championships. Ignatyev was initially named to the Olympic Team for the 2016 Summer Olympics in Rio de Janeiro, Brazil, but was replaced by Ivan Stretovich only a few days before the Games began.

In 2021 Ignatyev competed at the World Championships. He qualified for the All-Around final and finished 17.

On 2 July 2023 Valentina Rodionenko, coach of the national artistic gymnastics team, announced that Ignatyev decided to end his career.
