= Round Lake (gymnastics) =

Gymnastics facility in Moscow, Russia

Round Lake (Russian: Озеро Круглое, Ozero Krugloye) is a training facility for elite Soviet and later Russian gymnasts. It is located outside Moscow.
