= Nikolai Kuksenkov =

Ukrainian-Russian gymnast

- Full name: Nikolai Yulievich Kuksenkov
- Alternative name: Mykola Yuliyovych Kuksenkov
- Born: 2 June 1989 (age 37) Kiev, Ukraine SSR, Soviet Union
- Height: 172 cm (5 ft 8 in)

Gymnastics career
- Discipline: Men's artistic gymnastics
- Country represented: Russia
- Former countries represented: Ukraine
- Club: Dynamo
- Assistant coach: Igor Kalabushkin
Medal record
Representing Russia
Men's artistic gymnastics
Olympic Games
Silver medal – second place	2016 Rio de Janeiro	Team
World Championships
Silver medal – second place	2018 Doha	Team
European Games
Gold medal – first place	2015 Baku	Team
European Championships
Gold medal – first place	2014 Sofia	Team
Gold medal – first place	2016 Bern	Team
Gold medal – first place	2018 Glasgow	Team
Summer Universiade
Gold medal – first place	2013 Kazan	Team
Gold medal – first place	2013 Kazan	All-around
Gold medal – first place	2013 Kazan	Pommel horse
Representing Ukraine
European Championships
Bronze medal – third place	2009 Milan	Horizontal bar
Bronze medal – third place	2011 Berlin	All-around
Summer Universiade
Gold medal – first place	2011 Shenzhen	All-around
Silver medal – second place	2011 Shenzhen	Horizontal bar

Nikolai Yulievich Kuksenkov (Russian: Николай Юльевич Куксенков, Ukrainian: Микола Юлійович Куксенков; born 2 June 1989) is a retired Russian gymnast who won a silver medal in the team event at the 2016 Summer Olympics. He competed for Ukraine for many years and moved to Russia after the 2012 Summer Olympics in London, where he placed fourth in the all-around and fourth with the team.

== Personal life ==
Kuksenkov was born on 2 June 1989 in Kiev, Ukraine SSR, Soviet Union. He received Russian citizenship on 23 April 2013.

== Career ==
=== For Ukraine ===
Kuksenkov was a member of the junior Ukrainian team that won team gold at the European Championships. In 2008, he finished 4th in all-around at the 2008 European Championships, Kuksenkov missed qualifying in the Ukrainian Team for the 2008 Summer Olympics because of an injury where he underwent surgery and took a while for the recovery. He won gold in All-around and silver in Horizontal Bar at the 2011 Summer Universiade. He won bronze medal in All-around at the 2011 European Championships.

He competed for Ukraine's national team at the 2012 Summer Olympics in the Men's artistic team all-around and the Men's artistic individual all-around. The Ukrainian team, consisting of Kuksenkov, Igor Radivilov, Vitalii Nakonechnyi, Oleg Stepko and Oleg Verniaiev finished in 4th place in the team final. They were initially awarded 3rd position although a successful appeal from the Japanese team over one of their athletes scores resulted in Japan being promoted from 4th to 2nd place, displacing Ukraine from the medals. In the individual final Kuksenkov also finished in 4th position, again just missing out on a medal.

=== For Russia ===
In December 2012, Kuksenkov decided to switch to the Russian team. Now competing for Russia, he returned to international competition at the 2013 Summer Universiade, in Kazan. Kuksenkov, alongside the Russian team (Emin Garibov, David Belyavskiy, Denis Ablyazin and Nikita Ignatyev) won Russia the team gold medal. He won gold medal in Pommel Horse and defended his All-around title in Kazan winning another gold medal.

On May 19–25, at the 2014 European Championships in Sofia, Kuksenkov contributed scores of 15.133 (pommel horse), 15.066 (rings), 14.866 (parallel bar) and 14.833 (horizontal bar) for Russia and along with teammates (Denis Ablyazin, Aleksandr Balandin, Nikita Ignatyev, David Belyavskiy) won Russia the Team Event gold medal with a total score of 267.959 ahead of Great Britain. At the 2014 World Championships in Nanning, Kuksenkov also competed along teammates (Denis Ablyazin, David Belyavskiy, Nikita Ignatyev, Daniil Kazachkov and Ivan Stretovich) with Team Russia finishing 5th in the Team Final.

In June 2015, Kuksenkov competed in the 2015 European Games, winning gold in the Team Competition (with teammates David Belyavskiy and Nikita Ignatyev).

In April 2016, Kuksenkov became the subject of turmoil with the news spreading that he had tested positive for meldonium in a failed drugs test. The announcement came a day after he was crowned the Russian National champion, leading to his withdrawal from the remainder of the competition. He was temporarily suspended from Competition, however On April 13, the World Anti-Doping Agency gave amnesty to athletes with the presence of less than 1 microgram of meldonium in doping samples in tests conducted on athletes before March 1, 2016 is acceptable, WADA cites due to uncertainties and lack of studies for how long meldonium stays in the body., his suspension was lifted and he was allowed to train with the Russian Team for the 2016 European Championships.

At the 2016 European Championships in May, Kuksenkov competed on pommel horse (15.066), parallel bars (14.266) and high bar (14.200) to help the Russia team gold with a score of 271.378. He also qualified to the pommel horse final where he finished 5th with a score of 14.566 after a fall.

Kuksenkov won his first Olympic silver medal at the 2016 Summer Olympics in Team event (together with Denis Ablyazin, Nikita Nagornyy, Ivan Stretovich and David Belyavskiy).

In December 2019, Kuksenkov announced his retirement from competitive gymnastics in an Instagram post, stating that he would start working as a coach for the National Russian team.

== Competitive history ==
Year	Event	Team	AA	FX	PH	SR	VT	PB	HB
2006	World Championships		21st						
2009	World Championships		9th						
2010	World Championships		4th						
2011	European Championships		3rd					4th	6th
2011	World Championships	5th	7th						
2012	Olympic Games	4th	4th						
2013	Universiade	1st	1st		1st				
2013	World Championships								
2014	European Championships	1st			4th			5th	
2014	World Championships	5th	9th					8th	6th
2015	National Championships	1st	2nd		5th	2nd		2nd	1st
2015	European Championships		11th						
2015	European Games	1st							
2015	World Championships	4th	6th						
2016	National Championships	4th	1st						
2016	European Championships	1st			5th				
2016	Olympic Games	2nd							
2017	Russian Cup				4th			8th	
2018	National Championships	2nd	33rd		2nd				3rd
2018	Russian Cup				2nd				8th
2018	European Championships	1st			5th				
2018	World Championships	2nd							

== See also ==
- List of Olympic male artistic gymnasts for Russia
- Nationality changes in gymnastics
