= Natalia Kapitonova =

Russian artistic gymnast

- Full name: Natalia Andreevna Kapitonova
- Born: May 31, 2000 (age 26) Penza, Penza Oblast, Russia

Gymnastics career
- Discipline: Women's artistic gymnastics
- Country represented: Russia

Natalia Andreevna Kapitonova (Russian: Наталья Андреевна Капитонова) (born 31 May 2000) is a Russian artistic gymnast.

== Junior career ==
=== 2013-2014 ===
In 2013, Kapitonova won team silver at the Russian Junior Championships and silver on bars at the Voronin Cup. The following year, she competed at the Russian Hopes, winning gold on floor exercise and silver in the all-around and on bars. She made her international debut in France at the Tournoi International Combs-la-Ville, winning team, all-around, and uneven bars gold and floor exercise bronze. At the Voronin Cup at the end of the year, she won team silver and uneven bars gold.

=== 2015 ===
In March, Kapitonova competed at the International Gymnix, winning uneven bars gold, team and all-around silver, vault bronze, and placing fourth on floor and fifth on beam. At the Russian Junior Championships in April, she won uneven bars silver, team bronze, and placed fourth on beam and floor and fifth in the all-around. At the Student Spartakiada in June, she won all-around, balance beam, and floor exercise gold, team and vault silver, and uneven bars bronze.

In November she competed at the Elite Gym Massilia in Marseille, France, where she took the uneven bars gold medal and helped her team to silver, finishing fourth individually all-around. At the Voronin Cup in December, she beat teammate Angelina Melnikova to the all-around junior title.

== Senior career ==
=== 2016 ===
On March 18–20, Kapitonova debuted in international competition at the DTB Pokal Team Challenge Cup where Team Russia won the gold medal. On April 30-May 1, she competed at the Osijek World Cup where he won silver in floor and bronze in uneven bars.

=== 2017 ===
On March 2 during the Russian Nationals held in Kazan, Russia, Kapitonova defeated Olympians Seda Tuthkhalyan, Angelina Melnikova as well as 2016 Junior European Champion Elena Eremina to become the Russian National All-Around Champion as well as the co-Uneven Bars Champion with Daria Spiridonova. She was then assigned to DTB Pokal Team Challenge Cup at Stuttgart, Germany. She helped the Russian team win gold by nearly 5 points. Then, she attended the 2017 Jesolo Trophy event where she contributed to the bronze medal performance of the Russian squad. After her clutch performances at these competitions, Kapitonova was named to the Russian Team for the 2017 Europeans.

== Competitive history ==
=== Junior ===
Year	Event	Team	AA	VT	UB	BB	FX
2013	Russian Championships	2nd place, silver medalist(s)					
2013	Voronin Cup				2nd place, silver medalist(s)		
2014	Russian Hopes (KMS)		2nd place, silver medalist(s)		2nd place, silver medalist(s)		1st place, gold medalist(s)
2014	Tournoi Int'l Combs-la-Ville	1st place, gold medalist(s)	1st place, gold medalist(s)		1st place, gold medalist(s)		3rd place, bronze medalist(s)
2014	Voronin Cup	2nd place, silver medalist(s)	4		1st place, gold medalist(s)		4
2015	International Gymnix	2nd place, silver medalist(s)	2nd place, silver medalist(s)	3rd place, bronze medalist(s)	1st place, gold medalist(s)	5	4
2015	National Championships	3rd place, bronze medalist(s)	5		2nd place, silver medalist(s)	4	4
2015	Student Spartakiada	2nd place, silver medalist(s)	1st place, gold medalist(s)	2nd place, silver medalist(s)	3rd place, bronze medalist(s)	1st place, gold medalist(s)	1st place, gold medalist(s)
2015	Elite Gym Massilia	2nd place, silver medalist(s)	4		1st place, gold medalist(s)		
2015	Russian Hopes (MS Junior)	2nd place, silver medalist(s)	1st place, gold medalist(s)		1st place, gold medalist(s)	1st place, gold medalist(s)	1st place, gold medalist(s)
2015	Voronin Cup (Junior)	2nd place, silver medalist(s)	1st place, gold medalist(s)		1st place, gold medalist(s)	1st place, gold medalist(s)	2nd place, silver medalist(s)

=== Senior ===
Year	Event	Team	AA	VT	UB	BB	FX
2016	DTB Pokal Team Challenge Cup	1st place, gold medalist(s)					
2016	National Championships	3rd place, bronze medalist(s)	6		4		5
2016	Osijek World Cup				3rd place, bronze medalist(s)		2nd place, silver medalist(s)
2016	Russian Cup	2nd place, silver medalist(s)	5		1st place, gold medalist(s)		2nd place, silver medalist(s)
2017	National Championships	4	1st place, gold medalist(s)		1st place, gold medalist(s)		4
2017	DTB Pokal Team Challenge Cup	1st place, gold medalist(s)					
2017	City of Jesolo Trophy	3rd place, bronze medalist(s)	16				
2017	European Championships		9				
2018	Voronin Cup				3rd place, bronze medalist(s)		1st place, gold medalist(s)
2021	National Championships	3rd place, bronze medalist(s)					

Year	Competition Description	Location	Apparatus	Rank-Final	Score-Final	Rank-Qualifying	Score-Qualifying
2017	European Championships	Cluj-Napoca	All-Around	9	52.766	12	52.898
2017	European Championships	Cluj-Napoca	Uneven Bars			10	13.866
2017	European Championships	Cluj-Napoca	Balance Beam			23	12.500
2017	European Championships	Cluj-Napoca	Floor Exercise			12	12.966
