= Maria Bondareva =

Russian artistic gymnast

- Full name: Maria Anatolyevna Bondareva
- Nickname: Masha
- Born: 28 November 1999 (age 26) Fryazino, Moscow Oblast, Russia

Gymnastics career
- Discipline: Women's artistic gymnastics
- Country represented: Russia (2012–2015)
- Head coaches: Ulyana Pursheva, Yuriy Bachurin
- Retired: 2015
Medal record
Representing Russia
Junior European Championships
Gold medal – first place	2014 Sofia	Team
European Youth Olympic Festival
Gold medal – first place	2013 Utrecht	Team
Gold medal – first place	2013 Utrecht	Balance beam

Maria Anatolyevna Bondareva (Russian: Мария Анатольевна Бондарева; born 28 November 1999) is a Russian former artistic gymnast. She was a member of the team that won the gold medal at the 2014 Junior European Championships. She is the 2013 European Youth Olympic Festival champion on the balance beam and with the team.

== Gymnastics career ==
=== Junior ===
==== 2012 ====
Bondareva competed at the International Gymnix in Montreal and helped her team win the gold medal. She also won the gold medal in the all-around and on the uneven bars, balance beam, and floor exercise. She won the all-around gold medal at the Russian Championships in the Candidate Master of Sport category with a total score of 56.867. At the City of Jesolo Trophy, she helped the junior Russian team win the bronze medal, and she placed eighth in the all-around.

==== 2013 ====
Bondareva competed at the International Gymnix and helped the Russian team win the gold medal. She also tied for gold in the all-around with her teammate, Anastasia Dmitrieva, and she won the silver medal on the balance beam. Then at the Lugano Trophy, she won the silver medal in the all-around behind Romanian gymnast Andreea Munteanu.

At the European Youth Olympic Festival, Bondareva won the team gold medal alongside Maria Kharenkova and Viktoria Kuzmina. She won the gold medal on the balance beam. She placed fifth in the all-around final with a score of 54.200. Then at the Japan Junior International, she placed sixth in the all-around and won the bronze medal on the uneven bars behind American Bailie Key and Romanian Andreea Iridon.

==== 2014 ====
Bondareva competed at the Junior Russian Championships, and she won the gold medal with her team. However, she pulled out of the all-around and event finals. At the European Championships she competed alongside Angelina Melnikova, Seda Tutkhalyan, Anastasia Dmitrieva, and Daria Skrypnik, and they won the team gold medal. In November, she competed at the KSI-Matsz Cup in Budapest and won the bronze medal in the all-around behind Ekaterina Sokova and Zsofia Kovacs.

=== Senior ===
==== 2015 ====
Bondareva became age-eligible for senior competition in 2015. In March, she competed at the Russian Championships in Penza. She won the gold medal with her team, and she placed eighth in the all-around, uneven bars, and floor exercise. She then competed at a friendly meet against Italy, Romania, and Colombia, and the Russian team won the gold medal. In October, she retired from gymnastics due to a back injury.

== Competitive history ==
Competitive history of Maria Bondareva at the junior level
Year	Event	Team	AA	VT	UB	BB	FX
2012	International Gymnix	1st place, gold medalist(s)	1st place, gold medalist(s)		1st place, gold medalist(s)	1st place, gold medalist(s)	1st place, gold medalist(s)
2012	Junior Russian Championships		1st place, gold medalist(s)	3rd place, bronze medalist(s)	1st place, gold medalist(s)	1st place, gold medalist(s)	1st place, gold medalist(s)
2012	City of Jesolo Trophy	3rd place, bronze medalist(s)	8				
2013	International Gymnix	1st place, gold medalist(s)	1st place, gold medalist(s)	5	8	2nd place, silver medalist(s)	4
2013	Junior Russian Championships	3rd place, bronze medalist(s)	1st place, gold medalist(s)			1st place, gold medalist(s)	1st place, gold medalist(s)
2013	Lugano Trophy		2nd place, silver medalist(s)				
2013	European Youth Olympic Festival	1st place, gold medalist(s)	5			1st place, gold medalist(s)	
2013	Japan Junior International		6		3rd place, bronze medalist(s)		
2014	Junior Russian Championships	1st place, gold medalist(s)					
2014	Junior European Championships	1st place, gold medalist(s)					
2014	KSI Cup	1st place, gold medalist(s)	3rd place, bronze medalist(s)				

Competitive history of Maria Bondareva at the senior level
Year	Event	Team	AA	VT	UB	BB	FX
2015	Russian Championships	1st place, gold medalist(s)	8		8		8
2015	Four Nations Trophy	1st place, gold medalist(s)					
