= Ivan Stretovich =

Russian artistic gymnast

- Full name: Ivan Alexeyevich Stretovich
- Nickname: Vanya
- Born: 6 October 1996 (age 29) Novosibirsk, Novosibirsk Oblast, Russia
- Height: 1.7 m (5 ft 7 in)

Gymnastics career
- Discipline: Men's artistic gymnastics
- Country represented: Russia
- Club: Central Army Sports Club [CSKA], Novosibirsk
- Assistant coach: B. Konvissar
- Former coaches: Vladimir Kochnev, M.S. Nazarenko
Medal record
Representing Russia
Men's artistic gymnastics
Olympic Games
Silver medal – second place	2016 Rio de Janeiro	Team
World Championships
Gold medal – first place	2019 Stuttgart	Team
Summer Universiade
Silver medal – second place	2019 Napoli	All-Around
Silver medal – second place	2019 Napoli	Parallel Bars
Bronze medal – third place	2019 Napoli	Team
Bronze medal – third place	2019 Napoli	Horizontal Bar

Ivan Alexeyevich Stretovich (Russian: Иван Алексеевич Стретович; born 6 October 1996) is a Russian artistic gymnast. He won a silver medal in the team event at the 2016 Summer Olympics.

== Career ==
Stretovich started gymnastics at six years old when his mother took him to a gym club. He won gold at his first competition. He trains in Moscow, with the other members of the Russian team, and in Novosibirsk. His gymnastics idol is Hiroyuki Tomita.

=== Junior ===
Stretovich appeared in his first major international competition at the 2012 European Junior Championships where the Russian Team won the silver medal, he was the youngest member of the Team (15 years old).

In 2013, Stretovich won the all-around gold at the Russian Junior Championships (in the CMS section). He competed at the 2013 European Youth Olympic Festival where he took bronze medals in all-around, rings and gold in Parallel bars. Traveling to Brasília, Brazil for the 2013 Gymnasiade, Stretovich won gold in parallel bars and with Team Russia winning the gold medal ahead of Great Britain.

=== Senior ===
In 2014, Stretovich sustained an injury at the start of the season. He competed in his first Worlds at the 2014 World Artistic Gymnastics Championships in Nanning, China. Stretovich competed only in pommel horse in Team event and together with teammates (Denis Ablyazin, Nikita Ignatyev, Nikolai Kuksenkov, Daniil Kazachkov and David Belyavskiy) Team Russia finished 5th.

In 2015, Stretovich was again member of the Russian men competing at the 2015 World Championships in Glasgow, together with teammates (Denis Ablyazin, Nikita Ignatyev, Nikolai Kuksenkov, Nikita Nagornyy and David Belyavskiy)

In 2016, Stretovich competed at the Russian Cup in July; where he won gold in parallel bars and high bar. Stretovich was initially named as an alternate for the Olympic Team but only days before the games started he was chosen to replace Nikita Ignatyev on the team, allegedly due to him looking better in training at the time. Stretovich then competed with the Russian Team (together with Denis Ablyazin, Nikita Nagornyy, Nikolai Kuksenkov and David Belyavskiy) at the 2016 Summer Olympics in Rio de Janeiro, he contributed scores of 14.755 in pommel horse, 15.100 in parallel bars, 14.766 in horizontal bar; helping the Russian men's team win the silver medal with a total of 271.453 points.

In 2017, Stretovich suffered an arm injury and underwent treatment in Munich, Germany. On August 23–27, Stretovich returned to a national competition at the Russian Cup.

In 2019, Stretovich competed at the European Championships in April; where he placed sixth on the high bar. In July he competed the Summer Universiade in Napoli winning silver in the all-around and on parallel bars as well as bronze on horizontal bar and in the team competition. In September he competed at the Russian Cup where he won silver in the all-around competition behind Nikita Nagornyy and ahead of reigning All-Around World Champion Artur Dalaloyan. He was selected to compete at the World Championships for the first time since 2015 and placed 10th in the all-around in qualifying but did not progress to the finals because Nagornyy and Dalaloyan finished above him. In the team final Stretovich competed on Floor, Pommel Horse, Vault and High Bar to help Russia win team gold with a total of 261.726 points. Stretovich's score of 14.666 on High Bar during the team final was the highest of any gymnast in the final.

Competing alongside Angelina Melnikova, Stretovich helped team Russia finished Second at the Brabant Trophy in October. In December at the Toyota International in Tokyo, Stretovich won Bronze on High Bar.

On January 9, 2024, he announced his retirement from sports.

== Personal life ==
On May 20, 2024, Ivan Stretovich's grandmother died, and his son died during childbirth.

== Competitive history ==
Year	Event	Team	AA	FX	PH	SR	VT	PB	HB
Junior
2012	Russian Junior Championships	1st place, gold medalist(s)	1st place, gold medalist(s)						
2012	European Junior Championships	2nd place, silver medalist(s)	7						7
2013	Russian Junior Championships		1st place, gold medalist(s)						
2013	Gymnasiade	1st place, gold medalist(s)						1st place, gold medalist(s)	
2013	Euro Youth Olympic Festival	2nd place, silver medalist(s)	3rd place, bronze medalist(s)			3rd place, bronze medalist(s)		1st place, gold medalist(s)	
2013	Olympic Hopes Penza	1st place, gold medalist(s)	1st place, gold medalist(s)		1st place, gold medalist(s)	2nd place, silver medalist(s)		1st place, gold medalist(s)	2nd place, silver medalist(s)
Senior
2014	Russian Cup	2nd place, silver medalist(s)	5		3rd place, bronze medalist(s)				
2014	World Championships	5			97			56	34
2015	Russian Cup	7	27		2nd place, silver medalist(s)				5
2015	World Championships	4			24			58	
2015	National Championships	5		6					
2016	Russian Cup							1st place, gold medalist(s)	1st place, gold medalist(s)
2016	Olympic Games	2nd place, silver medalist(s)							
2018	National Championships	4	5	5				6	5
2018	Russian Cup	4	4	5	8		4		
2018	Voronin Cup		6	1st place, gold medalist(s)					1st place, gold medalist(s)
2019	National Championships		5	7					3rd place, bronze medalist(s)
2019	DTB Team Challenge	1st place, gold medalist(s)	5		2nd place, silver medalist(s)				
2019	European Championships								6
2019	World Championships	1st place, gold medalist(s)	10	56	22	60		32	19
2019	2019 Napoli	3rd place, bronze medalist(s)	2nd place, silver medalist(s)	11	30	20		2nd place, silver medalist(s)	3rd place, bronze medalist(s)
2019	Russian Cup		2nd place, silver medalist(s)	5	7			7	8
2019	Brabant Trophy	2nd place, silver medalist(s)							
2019	Toyota International				4			4	3rd place, bronze medalist(s)
2021	Russian Cup			1st place, gold medalist(s)					1st place, gold medalist(s)
2021	World Championships			12					12
2022
2022	Doha World Cup			17					19

== See also ==
- List of Olympic male artistic gymnasts for Russia
