= 2017 Russian Artistic Gymnastics Championships =

Gymnastics competition in Russia

Russian Artistic Gymnastics Championships
- Location: Kazan, Russia
- Date: March 1–5, 2017

The 2017 Russian Artistic Gymnastics Championships was held in Kazan, Russia between 1–5 March 2017.

== Medalists ==
Event	Gold	Silver	Bronze
Women
Team	Moscow; Elizaveta Kochetkova; Alla Sosnitskaya; Daria Spiridonova; Seda Tutkhalyan; Ksenia Artemova; Viktoria Trykina	Central Federal District-1; Angelina Melnikova; Darya Elizarova; Ekaterina Polikarpova; Evgeniya Shelgunova; Alina Bunina; Ksenia Kim	Saint Petersburg; Elena Eremina; Lilia Akhaimova; Anastasia Cheong; Varvara Batalova; Ekaterina Boeva; Maria Tsaryapkina
All-around	Natalia Kapitonova	Elena Eremina	Evgeniya Shelgunova
Vault	Seda Tutkhalyan	Lilia Akhaimova	Angelina Melnikova
Uneven bars	Natalia Kapitonova; Daria Spiridonova	N/A	Daria Skrypnik
Balance beam	Seda Tutkhalyan; Viktoria Trykina	N/A	Angelina Melnikova
Floor	Lilia Akhaimova	Elena Eremina	Seda Tutkhalyan
