= Evgenia Shelgunova =

Russian artistic gymnast

Evgeniya Shelgunova
- Full name: Evgeniya Andreevna Shelgunova
- Born: 3 August 1997 (age 29) Alatyr, Chuvash Republic, Russia

Gymnastics career
- Discipline: Women's artistic gymnastics
- Country represented: Russia; (2012–present)
- Head coaches: L.N. Marunova, N.A. Tikhonova
Medal record
Representing Russia
Summer Universiade
Gold medal – first place	2017 Taipei	Team

Evgeniya Andreyevna Shelgunova (Russian: Евге́ния Андре́евна Шелгуно́ва; born 3 August 1997) is a Russian artistic gymnast, Master of Sports of Russia.

== Career ==
She has been a member of the main Russian artistic gymnastics team since towards the end of 2012. Earlier, in 2011 Shelgunova won five gold and one silver medals at the 5th Summer Russian Student Games and in May 2012 at the European Junior Championships in Brussels took the gold in the team competition, the silver in the individual all-around, and the bronze on uneven bars. At the 2013 Russian Championships she won the bronze medal in the team event, the bronze medal in the individual all-around, and the gold medal on beam.

== Competitive history ==
Year	Event	Team	AA	VT	UB	BB	FX
2010	National Championships (Junior) (CMS)		4th		8th		
2010	Eurasian Youth Games	1st		2nd			
2011	City of Jesolo Trophy (Junior)	2nd	15th				
2011	National Championships (Junior) (CMS)		1st	1st	4th	6th	2nd
2011	European Youth Olympic Festival	4th	4th	4th			3rd
2011	Top Gym	1st	1st	2nd		5th	10th
2012	European Championships (Junior)	1st	2nd		3rd	4th	6th
2012	Dityatin Cup		2nd				
2012	Massilia Cup (Master Massilia)	1st	1st		5th	5th	4th
2012	Voronin Cup (Junior)		1st	2nd	4th	1st	5th
2013	National Championships	1st	3rd		5th	1st	5th
2013	Cottbus World Cup				6th		
2013	Massilia Cup (Master Massilia)	2nd	4th			3rd	
2013	Mexico Open		4th				
2014	Russian Hopes (MS)		3rd		3rd	2nd	1st
2015	National Championships	1st	5th		7th		2nd
2015	ITA-RUS-ROU-COL Friendly	1st	6th				
2015	Rusudan Sikharulidze tournament	1st	1st				1st
2015	Russian Cup	2nd	4th		4th	4th	
2015	Elite Gym Massilia	2nd	22nd				
2015	Voronin Cup				3rd		
2016	Igor Vihrov Cup		1st	1st	1st	1st	1st
2016	Antonia Koshel Cup		1st	1st	1st	1st	1st
2016	Volga District Championships		1st	1st	1st	1st	1st
2016	DTB Pokal Team Challenge Cup	1st					
2016	National Championships	1st	5th		8th	4th	4th
2016	Bundesliga	4th					
2016	Varna World Cup			5th	2nd		3rd
2016	Russian Cup	1st	4th		5th	3rd	4th
2017	National Championships	2nd	3rd			7th	
2017	DTB Pokal Team Challenge Cup	1st					
2017	Universiade	1st	4th		5th	4th	
