= Seda Tutkhalyan =

Russian artistic gymnast (born 1999)

Seda Tutkhalyan Седа Тутхалян Սեդա Թութխալյան
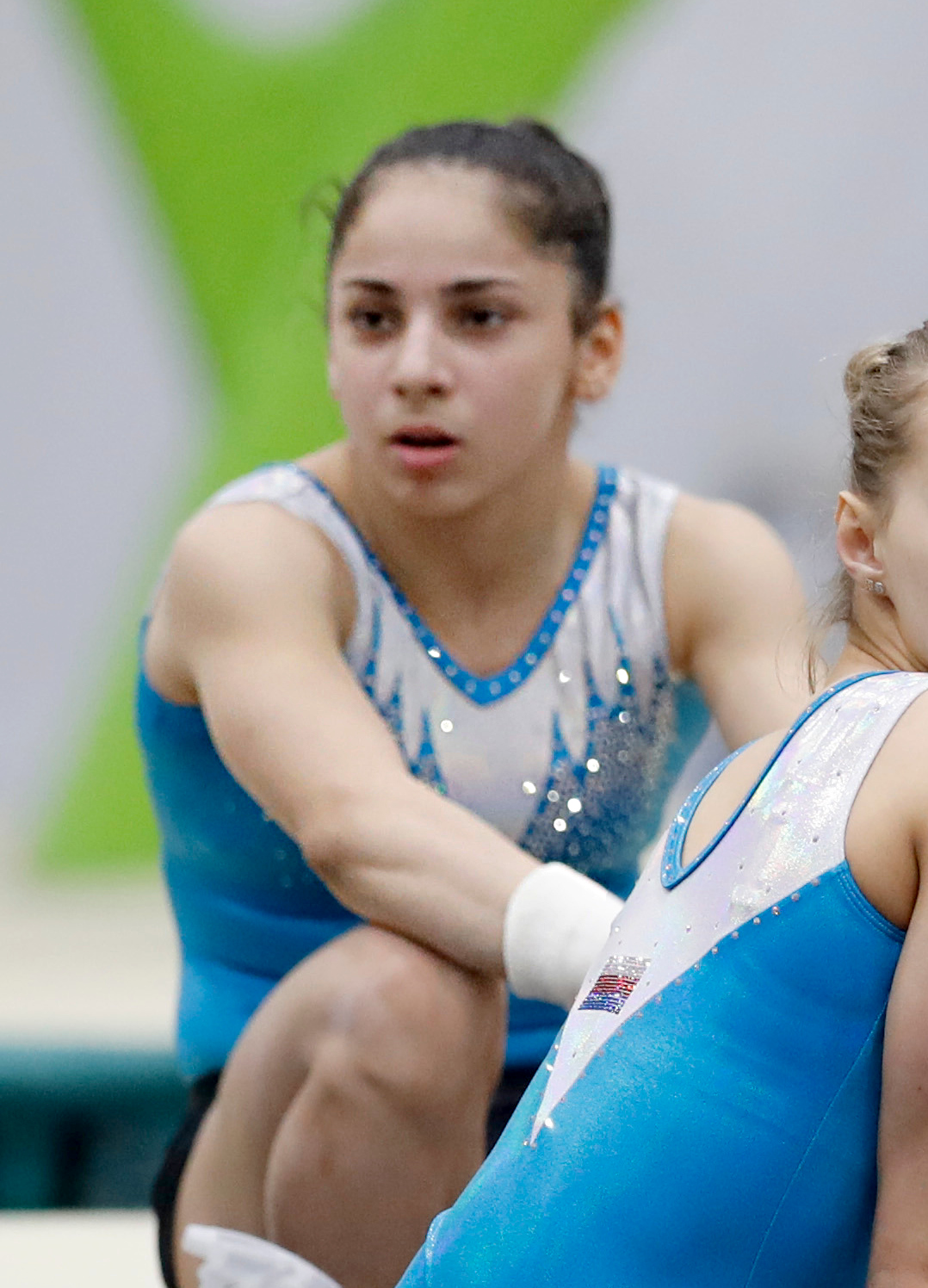
- Tutkhalyan at the 2016 Olympics

Personal information
- Full name: Seda Gurgenovna Tutkhalyan
- Born: 15 July 1999 (age 27) Gyumri, Armenia

Gymnastics career
- Discipline: Women's artistic gymnastics
- Country represented: Russia; (2013–2016)
- Head coach: Marina Ulyankina
- Assistant coaches: I.A. Kiryanova, V.N. Ulyankin
Medal record
Representing Russia
Olympic Games
Silver medal – second place	2016 Rio de Janeiro	Team
European Games
Gold medal – first place	2015 Baku	Team
Silver medal – second place	2015 Baku	Vault
European Championships
Gold medal – first place	2016 Bern	Team
Youth Olympic Games
Gold medal – first place	2014 Nanjing	All-Around
Gold medal – first place	2014 Nanjing	Uneven Bars
Silver medal – second place	2014 Nanjing	Floor Exercise

Seda Gurgenovna Tutkhalyan (Russian: Седа Гургеновна Тутхалян, Armenian: Սեդա Գուրգենի Թութխալյան; born 15 July 1999) is a Russian artistic gymnast. She is the 2014 Youth Olympic Games Individual All-around champion and a 2016 Summer Olympics Team silver medalist.

== Personal life ==
Tutkhalyan was born July 15, 1999, in Gyumri, Armenia, and moved to Moscow early in childhood. Her father, Gurgen Tutkhalyan, was a four-time world champion for the Soviet Union in sambo martial arts, and her older brother, Vaik, currently competes for Belarus in the same sport.

== Junior career ==
2013 was Tutkhalyan's breakout year. At the Russian Junior Championships, she won team, all-around, vault, and uneven bars gold, floor exercise bronze, and placed seventh on balance beam. Later, at the Olympic Hopes competition, she won gold with her team and on vault, and silver in the all-around and on floor exercise. Her international debut came that winter, at the Gymnasiade in Brazil, where she won team gold, floor exercise bronze, and placed fourth on beam, fifth in the all-around and on vault, and eighth on bars.

In 2014, she competed at the Russian Championships in April, winning vault gold, team, all-around, and uneven bars silver, and placing fifth on beam and sixth on floor. She competed at the European Championships, she won gold with her team and placed fourth on vault, seventh in the all-around and on balance beam, and eighth on floor exercise. In early July, she competed at the Student Spartakiada, winning team, all-around, and vault gold, uneven bars bronze, and placed fourth on floor. She was then selected to represent Russia at the 2014 Youth Olympic Games in Nanjing, China; there, she won the all-around and uneven bars, silver on floor exercise, and placed fifth on vault.

== Senior career ==
Tutkhalyan became a senior elite gymnast in 2015. At her senior debut at the Russian National Championships in early March, she won three bronze medals, for all-around, vault and balance beam.

In June, Tutkhalyan was named to the Russian team for the 2015 European Games in Baku, with Aliya Mustafina and Viktoria Komova. Tutkhalyan won the gold medal with the team, and posted the second-highest all-around score in qualification, 57.332. However, the highest score was by her teammate Mustafina and only one gymnast per country could advance to the final at these games. Tutkhalyan did qualify for the vault final in second place with a score of 14.466 for two vaults, and for the balance beam final in first place with a score of 14.600. Tutkhalyan was named to the Russian team for the 2015 World Artistic Gymnastics Championships. She helped her team to a 4th-place finish and individually qualified to the all-around and balance beam finals. In the all-around final, she placed 15th, and in the balance beam final, she placed 6th.

In 1–10 April 2016; Tutkhalyan competed at the 2016 Russian Artistic Gymnastics Championships taking silver in all-around, team and won gold in vault finals. On 30 April – 1 May, she competed at the Osijek World Cup where she won silver in uneven bars and bronze in balance beam finals. She was named to the team at the European Championships and contributed to the Russian team's gold medal finish; however, she did not make any individual finals.

=== 2016 Olympics ===
Tutkhalyan was named to the Russian Olympic team after Ksenia Afanasyeva's health problems relegated the latter gymnast to alternate and later forced her retirement from gymnastics. In qualifications, Tutkhalyan competed the all-around and qualified in 4th place to the all-around final with a score of 58.207. In the team final, she contributed a beam score of 14.766 and a floor score of 13.766 to the Russian team's silver medal finish.

In the all-around final, competing in the top group, Tutkhalyan began well with a vault score of 14.866 and a bars score of 15.033, and it appeared at that point that Seda would challenge her teammate Aliya Mustafina for a surprise bronze medal. However, these hopes began to dissipate on the beam, when she fell on her double-pike dismount after a mostly clean routine, receiving a score of 13.800, and multiple falls on floor, her last apparatus, left her with 10.966 on that event and a total all-around score of 54.665 for 22nd place. She had not made any event finals, although she was second reserve for the vault final.

== Competitive history ==
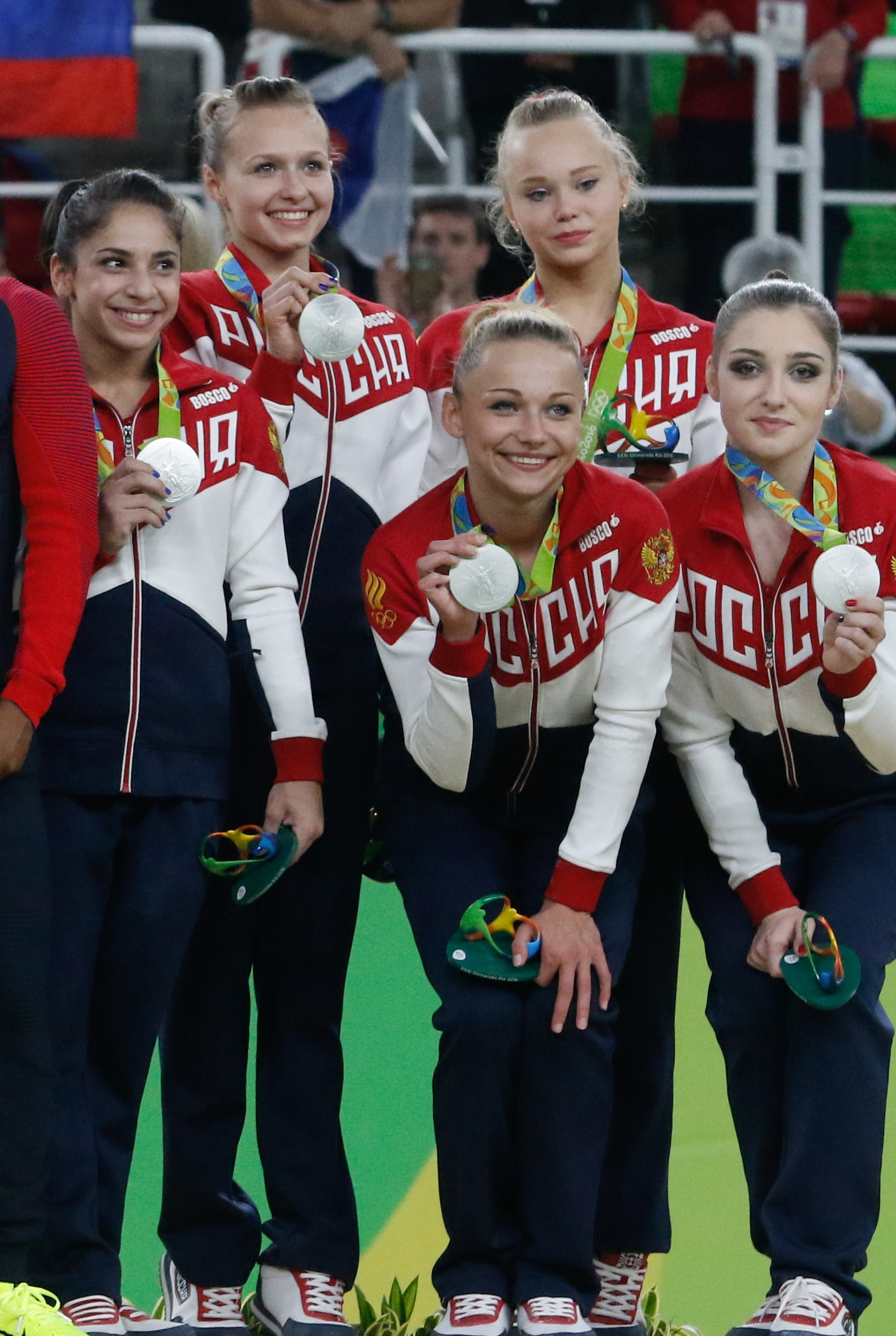
Tutkhalyan (far left) and the Russian team with their Olympic silver medals after the women's team final on 9 August 2016

Year	Event	Team	AA	VT	UB	BB	FX
Junior
2012	National Championships (CMS)		12			7	
2013	National Championships (CMS)	1st place, gold medalist(s)	1st place, gold medalist(s)	1st place, gold medalist(s)	1st place, gold medalist(s)	7	3rd place, bronze medalist(s)
2013	Olympic Hopes	1st place, gold medalist(s)	2nd place, silver medalist(s)	1st place, gold medalist(s)			2nd place, silver medalist(s)
2013	Gymnasiade	1st place, gold medalist(s)	5	5	8	4	3rd place, bronze medalist(s)
2014	National Championships (MS)	2nd place, silver medalist(s)	2nd place, silver medalist(s)	1st place, gold medalist(s)	2nd place, silver medalist(s)	5	6
2014	European Championships	1st place, gold medalist(s)	7	4		7	8
2014	Student Spartakiada	1st place, gold medalist(s)	1st place, gold medalist(s)	1st place, gold medalist(s)	3rd place, bronze medalist(s)		4
2014	Black Sea (99)		9		2nd place, silver medalist(s)	1st place, gold medalist(s)	1st place, gold medalist(s)
2014	Youth Olympic Games		1st place, gold medalist(s)	5	1st place, gold medalist(s)		2nd place, silver medalist(s)
Senior
2015	National Championships	2nd place, silver medalist(s)	3rd place, bronze medalist(s)	3rd place, bronze medalist(s)	6	3rd place, bronze medalist(s)	6
2015	ITA-RUS-ROU-COL Friendly	1st place, gold medalist(s)	1st place, gold medalist(s)				
2015	European Games	1st place, gold medalist(s)		2nd place, silver medalist(s)		5	
2015	Rusudan Sikharulidze tournament	1st place, gold medalist(s)	2nd place, silver medalist(s)	2nd place, silver medalist(s)		1st place, gold medalist(s)	
2015	Russian Cup	1st place, gold medalist(s)	2nd place, silver medalist(s)	2nd place, silver medalist(s)	2nd place, silver medalist(s)		4
2015	World Championships	4	15			6	
2015	Voronin Cup						1st place, gold medalist(s)
2016	Stuttgart World Cup		4				
2016	National Championships	2nd place, silver medalist(s)	2nd place, silver medalist(s)	1st place, gold medalist(s)		8	8
2016	Osijek World Cup				2nd place, silver medalist(s)	3rd place, bronze medalist(s)	
2016	European Championships	1st place, gold medalist(s)					
2016	Russian Cup	4	2nd place, silver medalist(s)	2nd place, silver medalist(s)	4	2nd place, silver medalist(s)	6
2016	Olympic Games	2nd place, silver medalist(s)	22				
2016	Joaquim Blume Memorial		3rd place, bronze medalist(s)				
2016	Elite Gym Massilia	1st place, gold medalist(s)	13	6			7
2016	Toyota International			1st place, gold medalist(s)			8
2017	National Championships	1st place, gold medalist(s)	4	1st place, gold medalist(s)	8	1st place, gold medalist(s)	3rd place, bronze medalist(s)
2018	National Championships	3rd place, bronze medalist(s)		7			
2019	National Championships	1st place, gold medalist(s)	12		6	7	

=== International Scores ===
Year	Competition Description	Location	Apparatus	Rank-Final	Score-Final	Rank-Qualifying	Score-Qualifying
2014	Youth Olympic Games	Nanjing	All-Around	1	54.900	1	53.650
2014	Youth Olympic Games	Nanjing	Vault	5	13.816	3	14.300
2014	Youth Olympic Games	Nanjing	Uneven Bars	1	13.575	3	13.000
2014	Youth Olympic Games	Nanjing	Balance Beam			9	12.900
2014	Youth Olympic Games	Nanjing	Floor Exercise	2	13.733	3	13.150
2015	European Games	Baku	Team	1	116.897		
2015	European Games	Baku	All-Around	15	55.432	2	57.332
2015	European Games	Baku	Vault	2	14.683	2	14.466
2015	European Games	Baku	Uneven Bars			6	14.166
2015	European Games	Baku	Balance Beam	5	13.566	1	14.600
2015	European Games	Baku	Floor Exercise			9	13.600
2015	World Championships	Glasgow	Team	4	171.964	2	231.437
2015	World Championships	Glasgow	All-Around	15	55.432	7	56.599
2015	World Championships	Glasgow	Vault			9	14.816
2015	World Championships	Glasgow	Uneven Bars			20	14.066
2015	World Championships	Glasgow	Balance Beam	6	13.500	5	14.533
2015	World Championships	Glasgow	Floor Exercise			83	13.100
2016	European Championships	Bern	Team	1	175.212	2	173.261
2016	European Championships	Bern	Vault			10	14.283
2016	European Championships	Bern	Balance Beam			11	13.833
2016	European Championships	Bern	Floor Exercise			10	13.766
2016	Olympic Games	Rio de Janeiro	Team	2	176.688	3	174.620
2016	Olympic Games	Rio de Janeiro	All-Around	22	54.665	5	58.207
2016	Olympic Games	Rio de Janeiro	Vault			10	14.733
2016	Olympic Games	Rio de Janeiro	Uneven Bars			11	15.133
2016	Olympic Games	Rio de Janeiro	Balance Beam			14	14.466
2016	Olympic Games	Rio de Janeiro	Floor Exercise			25	13.875
