= Gymnastics at the 2020 Summer Olympics – Women's artistic individual all-around =

Women's artistic individual all-around at the Games of the XXXII Olympiad
- Venue: Ariake Gymnastics Centre
- Date: 29 July 2021
- Competitors: 24 from 16 nations
- Winning total: 57.433 points

Medalists
1st place, gold medalist(s)		Sunisa Lee	United States
2nd place, silver medalist(s)		Rebeca Andrade	Brazil
3rd place, bronze medalist(s)		Angelina Melnikova	ROC

The women's artistic individual all-around event at the 2020 Summer Olympics in Tokyo was held at the Ariake Gymnastics Centre on 29 July 2021. Approximately 80 gymnasts from 49 nations (of the 98 total gymnasts) competed in the all-around in the qualifying round.

Sunisa Lee won the competition, continuing the winning streak of the United States since 2004 in the women's individual all-around. All five events were won by different athletes. Lee is the first women's individual all-around champion of Asian descent, the first Asian-American individual Olympic champion in women's artistic gymnastics, and the first Hmong-American Olympic champion in any sport. Brazil's Rebeca Andrade earned the silver medal for her first Olympic medal, as well as the first medal in women's artistic gymnastics for her country. Andrade is also the first all-around medalist from a country which did not qualify a full team to the Olympics. Angelina Melnikova of ROC rounded off the podium in bronze, adding an individual medal to her two Olympic team medals. Melnikova earned a third consecutive bronze medal for Russian gymnasts in the women's individual all-around, following two from Aliya Mustafina.

The medals for the competition were presented by Anant Singh, South Africa; IOC Member, and the medalists' bouquets were presented by Donatella Sacchi, Italy; FIG Delegate.

== Background ==
This was the 18th appearance of the women's individual all-around. The first individual all-around competition was held at the 1952 Summer Olympics, and has been held at every edition since. Defending champion Simone Biles of the United States was aiming to become the first woman to defend their Olympic title since Věra Čáslavská did so in 1964 and 1968. However, she withdrew after the first rotation of the women's team final on 26 July after an issue on vault. During the post-meet press conference, Biles cited mental health reasons as the reason she did not continue the competition. The following day, USA Gymnastics confirmed that following further medical evaluation, Biles would also not be competing in the women's individual all-around final. Ellie Black of Canada re-injured her ankle during training the day before the individual women's all around final, and subsequently announced her withdrawal. They were replaced by Jade Carey and Lieke Wevers in the final.

== Qualification ==
A National Olympic Committee (NOC) could enter up to 6 qualified gymnasts: a team of 4 and up to 2 specialists. A total of 98 quota places are allocated to women's gymnastics.

The 12 teams that qualify will be able to send 4 gymnasts in the team competition, for a total of 48 of the 98 quota places. The top three teams at the 2018 World Artistic Gymnastics Championships (the United States, Russia, and China) and the top nine teams (excluding those already qualified) at the 2019 World Artistic Gymnastics Championships (France, Canada, the Netherlands, Great Britain, Italy, Germany, Belgium, Japan, and Spain) earned team qualification places.

The remaining 50 quota places are awarded individually. Each gymnast can only earn one place, except that gymnasts that competed with a team that qualified are eligible to earn a second place through the 2020 All Around World Cup Series. Some of the individual events are open to gymnasts from NOCs with qualified teams, while others are not. These places are filled through various criteria based on the 2019 World Championships, the 2020 FIG Artistic Gymnastics World Cup series, continental championships, a host guarantee, and a Tripartite Commission invitation.

Each of the 98 qualified gymnasts are eligible for the individual all-around competition, but many gymnasts do not compete in each of the apparatus events.

The COVID-19 pandemic delayed many of the events for qualifying for gymnastics. The 2018 and 2019 World Championships were completed on time, but many of the World Cup series events were delayed into 2021.

== Competition format ==
The top 24 qualifiers in the qualification phase (limit two per NOC) advance to the all-around final. The finalists perform an additional exercise on each apparatus. Qualification scores are then ignored, with only final round scores counting. Scoring is according to the FIG Code of Points.

== Schedule ==
The competition was held over two days, Sunday, 25 July and Thursday, 29 July. The qualifying round (for all women's gymnastics events) was the first day; the all-around final was on the second day.

Date	Time	Round	Subdivision
25 July	10:00	Qualification	Subdivision 1
25 July	11:50	Qualification	Subdivision 2
25 July	15:10	Qualification	Subdivision 3
25 July	17:05	Qualification	Subdivision 4
25 July	20:20	Qualification	Subdivision 5
29 July	19:50	Final	–
All times are local time (UTC+09:00).

== Results ==
=== Qualifying ===
The gymnasts who ranked in the top twenty-four qualified for the final round. In cases where more than two gymnasts from the same NOC were in the top twenty-four, only the top two ranked among them would qualify to the final round, while the others would be excluded; the next-best ranked gymnast would qualify instead.

Rank	Gymnast	Vault (gymnastics)	Uneven bars	Balance beam	Floor (gymnastics)	Total	Results
1	Simone Biles (USA)	14.966	14.566	14.066	14.133	57.731	Q W
2	Rebeca Andrade (BRA)	15.400	14.200	13.733	14.066	57.399	Q
3	Sunisa Lee (USA)	14.333	15.200	14.200	13.433	57.166	Q
4	Angelina Melnikova (ROC)	14.466	14.933	13.733	14.000	57.132	Q
5	Vladislava Urazova (ROC)	14.600	14.866	14.000	13.633	57.099	Q
6	Viktoria Listunova (ROC)	14.300	14.766	13.866	14.000	56.932	–
7	Nina Derwael (BEL)	13.900	15.366	13.766	13.566	56.598	Q
8	Tang Xijing (CHN)	14.300	14.433	14.333	13.366	56.432	Q
9	Jade Carey (USA)	15.166	14.133	12.866	14.100	56.265	– S
10	Mélanie de Jesus dos Santos (FRA)	14.466	14.566	13.233	13.166	55.431	Q
11	MyKayla Skinner (USA)	14.933	13.666	13.233	13.566	55.398	–
12	Jessica Gadirova (GBR)	14.500	13.800	12.866	14.033	55.199	Q
13	Grace McCallum (USA)	14.533	14.100	13.066	13.466	55.165	–
14	Lu Yufei (CHN)	13.600	14.700	14.100	12.666	55.066	Q
15	Zhang Jin (CHN)	14.433	13.100	13.966	13.433	54.932	–
16	Zsófia Kovács (HUN)	14.500	14.433	13.133	12.666	54.732	Q
17	Jennifer Gadirova (GBR)	14.533	13.066	13.300	13.800	54.699	Q
18	Carolann Héduit (FRA)	14.233	13.966	13.200	12.900	54.299	Q
19	Elisabeth Seitz (GER)	14.266	14.700	12.333	12.933	54.232	Q
20	Alice D'Amato (ITA)	14.333	14.233	12.600	13.033	54.199	Q
21	Roxana Popa (ESP)	14.300	14.400	12.866	12.533	54.099	Q
22	Brooklyn Moors (CAN)	14.133	13.000	13.300	13.533	53.966	Q
23	Mai Murakami (JPN)	14.433	12.133	13.466	13.933	53.965	Q
24	Ellie Black (CAN)	14.533	12.800	14.100	12.266	53.699	Q W
25	Aline Friess (FRA)	14.966	13.666	12.500	12.500	53.632	–
26	Jutta Verkest (BEL)	13.400	13.633	13.666	12.933	53.632	Q
27	Martina Maggio (ITA)	14.100	13.700	13.066	12.700	53.566	Q
28	Lilia Akhaimova (ROC)	14.766	12.900	12.266	13.633	53.565	–
29	Lee Yun-seo (KOR)	13.400	14.333	12.841	12.966	53.540	Q
30	Giulia Steingruber (SUI)	14.833	12.800	12.600	13.300	53.533	Q
31	Kim Bui (GER)	13.466	14.066	12.666	13.200	53.398	Q
32	Lieke Wevers (NED)	13.600	13.533	13.366	12.866	53.365	R1 S
33	Amelie Morgan (GBR)	13.858	13.833	13.033	12.466	53.190	–
34	Asia D'Amato (ITA)	14.233	13.933	13.133	11.833	53.132	–
35	Maellyse Brassart (BEL)	13.766	13.366	13.033	12.766	52.931	–
36	Eythora Thorsdottir (NED)	14.433	13.000	12.333	13.133	52.899	R2
37	Georgia Godwin (AUS)	13.766	13.033	12.900	13.166	52.865	R3
38	Elena Gerasimova (ROC)	13.466	13.233	13.766	12.333	52.798	–
39	Hitomi Hatakeda (JPN)	12.266	14.133	13.000	13.333	52.732	R4

Reserves

The reserves for the individual all-around event final were:

1. Lieke Wevers (NED) – called up after Ellie Black's withdrawal
2. Eythora Thorsdottir (NED)
3. Georgia Godwin (AUS)
4. Hitomi Hatakeda (JPN)

Only two gymnasts from each country may advance to the all-around final. Gymnasts who did not qualify for the final because of the quota, but had high enough scores to do so were:

- Viktoria Listunova (ROC)
- Jade Carey (USA) – called up after Simone Biles' withdrawal
- MyKayla Skinner (USA)
- Grace McCallum (USA)
- Zhang Jin (CHN)

=== Final ===
Rank	Gymnast	Vault (gymnastics)	Uneven bars	Balance beam	Floor (gymnastics)	Total
1st place, gold medalist(s)	Sunisa Lee (USA)	14.600 (=5)	15.300 (1)	13.833 (2)	13.700 (=5)	57.433
2nd place, silver medalist(s)	Rebeca Andrade (BRA)	15.300 (1)	14.666 (5)	13.666 (5)	13.666 (7)	57.298
3rd place, bronze medalist(s)	Angelina Melnikova (ROC)	14.633 (4)	14.900 (3)	13.700 (4)	13.966 (2)	57.199
4	Vladislava Urazova (ROC)	14.500 (=9)	14.866 (4)	14.200 (1)	13.400 (10)	56.966
5	Mai Murakami (JPN)	14.533 (8)	13.733 (12)	13.766 (3)	14.000 (1)	56.032
6	Nina Derwael (BEL)	13.900 (19)	15.266 (2)	13.366 (6)	13.433 (9)	55.965
7	Tang Xijing (CHN)	14.233 (16)	14.233 (8)	13.066 (9)	12.966 (18)	54.498
8	Jade Carey (USA)	15.200 (2)	13.500 (15)	11.533 (23)	13.966 (3)	54.199
9	Elisabeth Seitz (GER)	14.200 (17)	14.500 (6)	12.933 (10)	12.433 (23)	54.066
10	Jessica Gadirova (GBR)	14.566 (7)	13.666 (13)	12.033 (20)	13.700 (=5)	53.965
11	Mélanie de Jesus dos Santos (FRA)	14.366 (13)	13.833 (10)	12.166 (18)	13.333 (12)	53.698
12	Carolann Héduit (FRA)	14.400 (12)	13.566 (14)	12.566 (14)	13.033 (15)	53.565
13	Jennifer Gadirova (GBR)	14.400 (11)	12.400 (23)	12.933 (11)	13.800 (4)	53.533
14	Zsófia Kovács (HUN)	14.500 (=9)	14.233 (9)	12.100 (19)	12.600 (22)	53.433
15	Giulia Steingruber (SUI)	14.833 (3)	12.800 (20)	12.400 (16)	13.333 (11)	53.366
16	Brooklyn Moors (CAN)	14.300 (=14)	13.000 (18)	12.433 (15)	13.566 (8)	53.299
17	Kim Bui (GER)	13.466 (21)	13.766 (11)	12.600 (13)	13.166 (13)	52.998
18	Lu Yufei (CHN)	13.500 (20)	13.333 (17)	13.133 (7)	12.833 (19)	52.799
19	Martina Maggio (ITA)	14.033 (18)	12.466 (22)	13.066 (8)	13.000 (16)	52.565
20	Alice D'Amato (ITA)	14.300 (=14)	13.000 (19)	11.633 (22)	12.966 (17)	51.899
21	Lee Yun-seo (KOR)	13.400 (=22)	14.300 (7)	11.266 (24)	12.666 (20)	51.632
22	Roxana Popa (ESP)	14.600 (=5)	12.100 (24)	11.700 (21)	13.133 (14)	51.533
23	Jutta Verkest (BEL)	13.400 (=22)	12.466 (21)	12.733 (12)	12.633 (21)	51.232
24	Lieke Wevers (NED)	13.266 (24)	13.366 (16)	12.400 (17)	12.066 (24)	51.098
