= Maria Minaeva =

Russian artistic gymnast

Maria Minaeva Мария Минаева
- Full name: Maria Vyacheslavovna Minaeva
- Born: 19 April 2005 (age 21) Zelenodolsk

Gymnastics career
- Discipline: Women's artistic gymnastics
- Country represented: Russia (2019–2023)
- Head coach: Akhmetzyanova G.M.
- Assistant coach: Artomonov A.K.
Medal record
Women's artistic gymnastics
Representing Russia
FIG World Cup
Event	1st	2nd	3rd
Apparatus World Cup	1	1	0
Total	1	1	0

Maria Vyacheslavovna Minaeva (Russian: Мария Вячеславовна Минаева, born 19 April 2005) is a Russian former artistic gymnast and was a member of the Russian national gymnastics team.

== Early life ==
Maria was born in Zelenodolsk, Russia in 2005. She currently represents the Volga Federal District.

== Gymnastics career ==
=== Junior: 2019 ===
In May Minaeva competed at the Russian National Championships where she placed eighth in the all-around. She placed sixth on uneven bars, fifth on balance beam, and fourth on floor exercise. In November Minaeva competed at Elite Gym Massilia where she placed fifteenth in the all-around.

=== Senior: 2021–2022 ===
Minaeva turned senior in 2021. She competed at the national championships where she placed fifth in the all-around and fourth on uneven bars. At the Russian Cup she placed sixth in the all-around and on floor exercise. In September it was announced that Minaeva would compete at the upcoming World Championships alongside Angelina Melnikova, Vladislava Urazova, and Yana Vorona. While there she only competed on the uneven bars. She finished seventh in qualifications but did not advance to the final due to Melnikova and Urazova scoring higher.

In 2022 Minaeva competed at the Doha World Cup in early March. She qualified to the uneven bars and floor exercise finals. During event finals she won silver on the uneven bars behind compatriot Viktoria Listunova. While in Doha it was announced that starting March 7 Russian and Belarusian athletes would be banned from taking part in FIG-sanctioned competitions due to the 2022 Russian invasion of Ukraine. During the floor exercise event final she won gold. During Spartakiada all-around competition, Minaeva injured her Achilles and was out of training several months.

== Competitive history ==
Competitive history of Maria Minaeva
Year	Event	Team	AA	VT	UB	BB	FX
2019	Junior Russian Championships		8		6	5	4
2019	Elite Gym Massilia		15				
2021	National Championships	3rd place, bronze medalist(s)	5		4		
2021	Russian Cup		6				6
2022	Doha World Cup				2nd place, silver medalist(s)		1st place, gold medalist(s)
2022	National Championships	1st place, gold medalist(s)	2nd place, silver medalist(s)		6	4	5
2022	Russian Cup		3rd place, bronze medalist(s)	6	3rd place, bronze medalist(s)	4	3rd place, bronze medalist(s)
2022	Spartakiade	9	DNF				
