= Yana Vorona =

Russian artistic gymnast (born 2004)

- Яна Ворона
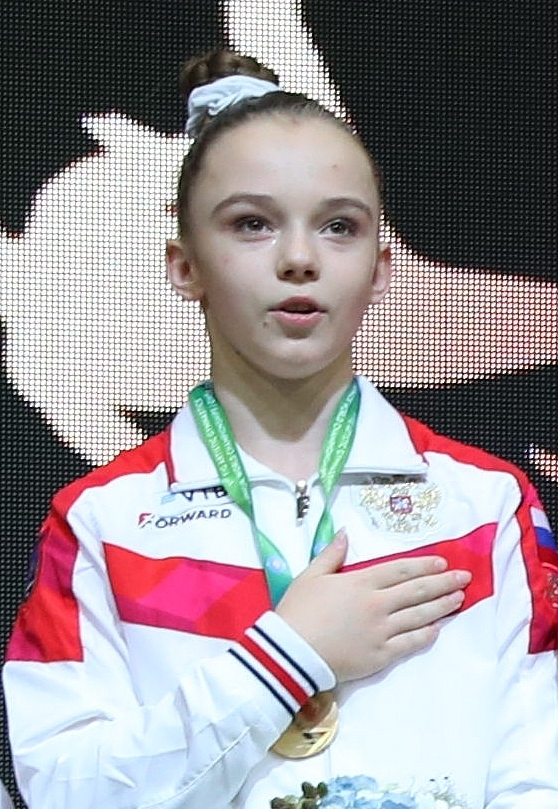
- Vorona at the 2019 Junior World Championships

Personal information
- Full name: Yana Gennadyevna Vorona
- Born: 28 December 2004 (age 21) Voronezh, Russia

Gymnastics career
- Discipline: Women's artistic gymnastics
- Country represented: Russia; (2018–2024)
- Club: E.S. Shtukman Secondary School
- Head coach: Elfimov GB
- Assistant coach: Pugach Yu.I.
- Retired: July 22, 2024
Medal record
Women's artistic gymnastics
Representing Russia
Junior World Championships
Gold medal – first place	2019 Győr	Team

Yana Gennadyevna Vorona (sometimes transliterated Iana) (Russian: Яна Геннадьевна Ворона, born 28 December 2004) is a Russian former artistic gymnast. She was a member of the team who won gold at the 2019 European Youth Olympic Festival and was the alternate for the team who won gold at the inaugural Junior World Championships.

== Early life ==
Yana Vorona was born in Voronezh, Russia in 2004.

== Junior gymnastics career ==
=== 2017–18 ===
Vorona competed at the 2017 Russian National Championships in April in the KMS division. She placed fifth in the all-around behind Olga Astafyeva, Irina Komnova, Elena Gerasimova, and Vladislava Urazova. During event finals she placed fourth on the vault and seventh on balance beam.

In July 2018 she competed at the Russian National Championships where she placed fourth in the all-around behind Ksenia Klimenko, Urazova, and Astafyeva. Additionally she placed fifth on vault, eighth on uneven bars, and second on balance beam and floor exercise behind Urazova. The following month Vorona competed at the 2018 European Championships alongside Urazova, Klimenko, Astafyeva, and Irina Komnova. They placed second in the team final behind Italy.

=== 2019 ===
In May Vorona competed at the Russian National Championships where she placed fourth in the all-around behind Vladislava Urazova, Viktoria Listunova, and Elena Gerasimova. She placed third on vault behind Urazova and Listunova, seventh on uneven bars, sixth on balance beam, and third on floor exercise, once again behind Listunova and Urazova.

In June Vorona was selected as the alternate for the inaugural Junior World Championships. She won a gold medal in the team final alongside her teammates Listunova, Urazova, and Gerasimova.

In July Vorona competed at the 2019 European Youth Olympic Festival alongside Listunova and Irina Komnova. While there she helped Russia win the gold in the team final. During the all-around final she won bronze, finishing behind Listunova and Ondine Achampong of Great Britain. During event finals she placed fourth on vault and floor exercise.

In August Vorona competed at the Russian Cup, where, although she was a junior, she competed against senior gymnasts. After two days of competition she finished fifth in the all-around competition, behind fellow junior Urazova, senior competitor Angelina Melnikova, junior Gerasimova, and senior Lilia Akhaimova. During event finals she won gold on balance beam, ahead of the 2019 Junior World Champion on the event, Gerasimova, and Urazova, and placed sixth on uneven bars.

In November Vorona competed at Elite Gym Massilia where she placed first in the all-around, ahead of Listunova, second on uneven bars, and third on balance beam.

== Senior gymnastics career ==
=== 2020 ===
In late January Vorona was listed on a nominative roster that was released for the Melbourne World Cup, scheduled to take place on February 20. While there she placed twelfth on balance beam during qualifications and did not advance to the finals. In March she competed at the Baku World Cup and finished fifth on balance beam and eighth on floor exercise during qualifications and advanced to the event finals for both. However event finals were canceled due to the COVID-19 pandemic in Azerbaijan. In late September it was announced that Vorona would be competing at an upcoming competition in Tokyo taking place in November alongside Angelina Melnikova, Elena Gerasimova, and Lilia Akhaimova (later replaced by Aleksandra Shchekoldina.

=== 2021 ===
Vorona competed at the national championships where she placed sixth in the all-around. At the Russian Cup she placed seventh. In September it was announced that Vorona would compete at the upcoming World Championships alongside Angelina Melnikova, Maria Minaeva, and Vladislava Urazova. While there she only competed on the balance beam. She fell during the final and placed ninth.

== Competitive history ==
Year	Event	Team	AA	VT	UB	BB	FX
Junior
2017	Russian Championships		5	4		7	
2018	Russian Championships		4	5	8	2nd place, silver medalist(s)	2nd place, silver medalist(s)
2018	European Championships	2nd place, silver medalist(s)					
2019	Russian Championships		4	3rd place, bronze medalist(s)	7	6	3rd place, bronze medalist(s)
2019	Junior World Championships	(gold) (Note: Vorona was the team RUS alternate)					
2019	Euro Youth Olympic Festival	1st place, gold medalist(s)	3rd place, bronze medalist(s)	4			4
2019	Russian Cup		5		6	1st place, gold medalist(s)	
2019	Elite Gym Massilia		1st place, gold medalist(s)		2nd place, silver medalist(s)	3rd place, bronze medalist(s)	
Senior
2020	Baku World Cup					(Note: Vorona qualified to the BB & FX finals; however event finals were canceled)	
2020	Friendship & Solidarity Meet	2nd place, silver medalist(s)					
2021	National Championships	4	6		6		
2021	Russian Cup		7				
2021	World Championships	—N/a				9	
2022	National Championships	3rd place, bronze medalist(s)	6			3rd place, bronze medalist(s)	4
2022	Russian Cup		6			1st place, gold medalist(s)	5
2022	Spartakiade	3rd place, bronze medalist(s)					
2023	National Championships	3rd place, bronze medalist(s)	6		3rd place, bronze medalist(s)	1st place, gold medalist(s)	2nd place, silver medalist(s)
