= 2021 Russian Artistic Gymnastics Championships =

Gymnastics competition in Russia

Russian Artistic Gymnastics Championships
- Location: Penza, Russia
- Date: March 10–14, 2021

The 2021 Russian Artistic Gymnastics Championships was held in Penza, Russia between 10 and 14 March 2021.

== Medalists ==
Event	Gold	Silver	Bronze
Women
Team	Moscow; Olga Astafieva; Viktoria Listunova; Uliana Perebinosova; Angelina Simakova; Viktoria Trykina; Varvara Zubova	Southern Federal District; Julia Biryulya; Ekaterina Fishenko; Maria Kharenkova; Christina Romanova; Daria Skrypnik; Vladislava Urazova	Volga; Anastasia Artamonova; Daria Belousova; Elena Gerasimova; Alena Glatova; Natalia Kapitonova; Maria Minaeva
All-around	Viktoria Listunova	Vladislava Urazova	Angelina Melnikova
Vault	Angelina Melnikova	Viktoria Listunova	Julia Biryulya
Uneven bars	Vladislava Urazova	Viktoria Listunova	Angelina Melnikova
Balance beam	Viktoria Listunova	Elena Gerasimova	Viktoria Trykina
Floor	Angelina Melnikova	Viktoria Listunova	Vladislava Urazova
Men
Team	Central Federal District - 1 Viktor Kalyuzhin; Aleksandr Kartsev; Ilya Kibartas; Sergey Krivunets; Kirill Prokopev; Alexey Rostov	Volga; Alexander Chicherov; Ruslan Makarov; Artyom Pleshkin; Vladislav Polyashov; Oleg Stupkin; Ildar Yuskaev	Moscow; Artur Dalaloyan; Alexey Kosyanov; Dmitriy Lankin; Mahamm Mamadaliev; Javokhi Mirzokulov; Nikita Zelensky
All-around	Aleksandr Kartsev	Artur Dalaloyan	David Belyavskiy
Floor	Artur Dalaloyan	Aleksandr Kartsev	Muhammadzhon Yakubov
Pommel horse	David Belyavskiy	Aleksandr Kartsev	Nikita Ignatiev
Rings	Grigory Klimentev	Denis Ablyazin	Artur Dalaloyan
Vault	Artur Dalaloyan	Mukhammadzhon Iakubov	Dmitriy Lankin
Parallel bars	Vladislav Polyashov	Artur Dalaloyan	Aleksandr Kartsev
High bar	Aleksandr Kartsev	Alexey Rostov	Ruslan Makarov

== Results ==
=== Women ===
==== All-Around ====
Rank	Gymnast	Team	Vault (gymnastics)	Uneven bars	Balance beam	Floor (gymnastics)	Day 1	Total
1st place, gold medalist(s)	Viktoria Listunova	Moscow	14.066	14.766	13.466	14.300	57.566	114.161
2nd place, silver medalist(s)	Vladislava Urazova	Southern	14.666	15.000	13.733	13.966	56.299	113.664
3rd place, bronze medalist(s)	Angelina Melnikova	Central	14.466	13.966	13.466	14.166	55.198	111.262
4	Elena Gerasimova	Volga	13.300	13.633	14.266	13.100	54.298	108.597
5	Maria Minaeva	Volga	13.633	14.133	13.200	12.133	54.264	107.363
6	Yana Vorona	Central	13.100	13.600	14.433	10.600	55.199	106.932
7	Lilia Akhaimova	Saint Petersburg	14.133	12.433	12.633	12.066	54.365	105.630
8	Olga Astafieva	Moscow	13.366	13.766	13.533	12.700	52.031	105.396
9	Elena Eremina	Saint Petersburg	13.066	12.666	12.966	13.100	51.465	103.263
10	Arina Semukhina	Ural	13.566	13.600	12.900	12.500	50.533	103.099
11	Varvara Zubova	Moscow	13.300	11.966	13.433	12.966	50.900	102.565
12	Aleksandra Shchekoldina	Ural	14.100	13.700	11.400	12.133	51.166	102.499
13	Maria Agafonova	Northwestern	12.800	12.466	12.333	13.333	51.499	102.431
14	Julia Biryulya	Southern	14.266	12.066	11.666	12.733	51.666	102.397
15	Anastasia Kureeva	Saint Petersburg	13.266	13.000	12.200	12.633	51.265	102.364
16	Daria Belousova	Volga	13.233	12.200	12.533	13.200	51.099	102.265
17	Uliana Perebinosova	Moscow	13.333	12.866	12.933	12.966	50.132	102.230
18	Alena Glotova	Volga	13.066	11.800	13.533	12.800	51.231	101.430
19	Daria Skrypnik	Southern	13.366	10.833	11.700	12.466	51.531	99.896
20	Ekaterina Boeva	Saint Petersburg	12.833	11.633	11.966	12.633	50.565	99.630
21	Irina Komnova	Central	12.400	13.733	10.733	12.400	50.032	99.298
22	Anastasia Artamonova	Volga	13.366	11.033	12.733	11.566	50.165	98.863
23	Valeria Saifulina	Saint Petersburg	13.066	10.566	12.400	11.800	50.099	97.931

==== Vault ====
Rank	Gymnast	Team	Vault 1	Vault 2	Average
Gold medal	Angelina Melnikova	Central	14.666	13.933	14.299
Silver medal	Viktoria Listunova	Moscow	14.433	13.100	13.766
Bronze medal	Julia Biryulya	Southern	14.300	13.233	13.766
4	Viktoria Trykina	Moscow	13.900	13.200	13.550
5	Aleksandra Maisel	Southern	13.500	13.600	13.550
6	Alina Shklokova	Northwestern	13.366	13.466	13.416
7	Olga Levenkova	Volga	12.433	12.700	12.566
8	Aleksandra Shchekoldina	Ural	12.900	12.066	12.483

==== Uneven Bars ====
Rank	Gymnast	Team	Total
Gold medal	Vladislava Urazova	Southern	15.000
Silver medal	Viktoria Listunova	Moscow	14.833
Bronze medal	Angelina Melnikova	Central	14.666
4	Maria Minaeva	Volga	14.500
5	Olga Astafieva	Moscow	13.833
6	Yana Vorona	Central	13.800
7	Anastasia Ilyankova	Siberia	13.600
8	Irina Komnova	Central	13.466

==== Balance Beam ====
Rank	Gymnast	Team	Total
Gold medal	Viktoria Listunova	Moscow	14.500
Silver medal	Elena Gerasimova	Volga	14.266
Bronze medal	Viktoria Trykina	Moscow	13.633
4	Yana Vorona	Central	12.600
5	Anastasia Ilyankova	Siberia	12.533
6	Maria Agafonova	Northwestern	12.200
7	Vladislava Urazova	Southern	11.933
8	Arina Semukhina	Ural	11.600

==== Floor Exercise ====
Rank	Gymnast	Team	Total
Gold medal	Angelina Melnikova	Central	14.400
Silver medal	Viktoria Listunova	Moscow	13.900
Bronze medal	Vladislava Urazova	Southern	13.700
4	Daria Belousova	Volga	12.766
5	Anastasia Artamonova	Volga	12.533
6	Olga Astafieva	Moscow	12.400
7	Elena Gerasimova	Volga	12.333
8	Ekaterina Boeva	Saint Petersburg	12.233

=== Men ===
==== All-Around ====
Rank	Gymnast	Team	Floor (gymnastics)	Pommel horse	Rings (gymnastics)	Vault (gymnastics)	Parallel bars	Horizontal bar	Day 1	Total
1st place, gold medalist(s)	Aleksandr Kartsev	Central	14.133	13.600	13.366	14.433	14.366	13.766	83.644	168.862
2nd place, silver medalist(s)	Artur Dalaloyan	Moscow / Central	14.866	12.033	14.233	14.900	12.100	14.166	82.298	167.629
3rd place, bronze medalist(s)	David Belyavskiy	Ural	13.500	14.533	14.100	13.500	14.766	14.033	84.432	167.597
4	Nikita Ignatyev	Siberian	13.200	13.733	13.900	14.200	13.766	13.933	82.732	165.230
5	Ivan Kuliak	Central	13.733	12.033	13.433	13.500	14.366	13.433	80.498	161.563
6	Viktor Kalyuzhin	Northwestern / Central	12.933	13.133	13.500	13.833	13.833	12.600	79.832	161.164
7	Kirill Prokopiev	Central	14.566	11.800	13.666	14.200	13.266	11.933	79.431	160.129
8	Ruslan Makarov	Volga	13.566	12.433	13.400	14.000	13.433	13.733	80.565	160.029
9	Artem Pleshkin	Volga	13.566	12.533	13.300	14.200	13.700	12.766	80.065	159.830
10	Viktor Britan	Central	13.300	12.333	13.000	13.700	13.400	13.266	78.999	159.130
11	Valentin Starikov	St. Petersburg	13.500	12.166	12.533	14.200	13.300	13.066	78.765	158.661
12	Alexey Rostov	Central	12.766	13.933	14.100	14.033	12.133	13.633	80.598	158.163
13	Mukhammadzhon Iakubov	Central	11.866	12.966	12.833	14.433	13.133	12.800	78.031	157.295
14	Ildar Yuskaev	Volga	12.600	13.633	13.200	13.766	12.666	12.533	78.398	156.063
15	Kirill Gashkov	Central	12.333	12.600	13.033	14.166	13.100	13.300	78.532	155.963
16	Sergei Naidin	Siberian	11.600	14.033	12.666	13.666	11.900	12.600	76.465	154.296
17	Sergei Krivunets	Central	13.633	12.400	12.433	13.066	12.600	12.933	77.065	153.430
18	Denis Yurov	Siberian	12.766	13.333	11.500	13.766	11.700	11.600	74.665	152.830
19	Daniil Monakov	St. Petersburg	12.333	13.733	11.300	13.033	13.033	12.833	76.265	152.795
20	Makhammadumar Mamadaliyev	Moscow	13.900	11.533	12.666	13.266	12.566	12.200	76.131	152.663
21	Oleg Stupkin	Volga	13.300	11.733	13.800	12.833	12.566	10.700	74.932	151.797
22	Alexey Kosyanov	Moscow	12.966	12.900	12.433	13.700	12.366	12.133	76.498	150.995
23	Dmitrii Miskov	Central	12.933	11.766	12.766	13.400	12.733	12.000	75.598	150.963
24	Daniil Ivanov	St. Petersburg	12.833	12.066	13.166	12.700	12.466	12.433	76.664	150.063
25	Ivan Sivkov	Central	12.233	12.400	12.300	12.900	12.600	11.833	74.266	149.598
26	Nikita Zelenskyi	Moscow	12.366	11.266	12.200	13.700	12.366	12.233	74.131	149.396
27	Mikhail Pavlov	Ural	12.666	12.500	12.133	12.800	12.466	12.700	75.265	148.696
28	Ivan Tsvetkov	Central	11.733	12.133	12.633	12.866	12.566	12.633	74.564	148.628
29	Nikita Andronov	Volga	11.966	12.000	11.966	12.466	12.866	12.266	73.530	147.995
30	Ivan Antonikhin	Central	10.000	13.033	12.766	12.533	12.566	12.833	73.731	147.862
31	Valentin Beskhmelnitsyn	Volga	11.433	10.766	12.333	13.100	13.533	13.133	74.298	147.629
32	Denis Tovpinets	St. Petersburg	11.200	13.566	12.800	12.566	10.966	10.400	71.498	147.362
33	Alexey Riabov	Siberian	12.066	8.800	12.466	12.833	11.233	12.533	69.931	144.330
