= 2018 Voronin Cup =

Athletics competition in Russia

Mikhail Voronin Cup
- Location: Moscow, Russia
- Date: December 12–13, 2018

The 2018 Mikhail Voronin Cup took place on December 12–13 in Moscow, Russia.

== Medal winners ==
=== Senior ===
Event	Gold	Silver	Bronze
Individual all-around	Alyona Shchennikova (USA)	Yeo Seo-jeong (KOR)	Hanna Traukova (BLR)
Vault	Yeo Seo-jeong (KOR)	Elina Vihrova (LAT)	Julie Erichsen (NOR)
Uneven Bars	Alyona Shchennikova (USA)	Liu Jieyu (CHN)	Natalia Kapitonova (RUS)
Balance Beam	Maria Kharenkova (RUS)	Alyona Shchennikova (USA)	Chen Xiaoqing (CHN)
Floor Exercise	Natalia Kapitonova (RUS)	Elina Vihrova (LAT)	Yeo Seo-jeong (KOR)

=== Junior ===
Event	Gold	Silver	Bronze
Individual all-around	Vladislava Urazova (RUS)	Viktoria Listunova (RUS)	Lee Yun-seo (KOR)
Vault	Vladislava Urazova (RUS)	Darya Yassinskaya (KAZ)	Viktoria Listunova (RUS)
Uneven Bars	Lee Yun-seo (KOR)	Vladislava Urazova (RUS)	Ganna Metelitsa (BLR)
Balance Beam	Elena Gerasimova (RUS)	Vladislava Urazova (RUS)	Darya Yassinskaya (KAZ)
Floor Exercise	Vladislava Urazova (RUS)	Viktoria Listunova (RUS)	Lee Yun-seo (KOR)
