= 2020 Friendship and Solidarity Competition =

2020 Friendship & Solidarity Competition
- Venue: Yoyogi National Gymnasium
- Location: Tokyo, Japan
- Dates: November 8, 2020

Medalists
gold medal	Team Solidarity
silver medal	Team Friendship

The 2020 Friendship and Solidarity Competition was an artistic gymnastics competition hosted by the International Gymnastics Federation and held in Tokyo, Japan on November 8, 2020. The competition implemented strict COVID-19 safety protocols that could serve as a foundation for holding the Tokyo Summer Olympic Games slated to begin July 23, 2021.

== Background ==
After the COVID-19 pandemic caused the mass majority of competitions in 2020 to be canceled and the 2020 Summer Olympics to be postponed until 2021, the FIG organized this event as a showcase of international camaraderie "at a time when unity has never seemed more important". A primary goal of the competition was to prove that staging a high-profile event in Tokyo is possible in the current context of the ongoing pandemic.

== Participants ==
Gymnasts from Japan, China, Russia, and the United States participated in the competition. Each federation was allowed to send eight athletes, 4 men and 4 women, although the United States opted to only send six athletes.

Japan		China		Russia		United States	
WAG	MAG	WAG	MAG	WAG	MAG	WAG	MAG
Hitomi Hatakeda; Chiaki Hatakeda; Akari Matsumura; Asuka Teramoto	Yuya Kamoto; Kazuma Kaya; Wataru Tanigawa; Kohei Uchimura	Liu Jieyu; Lu Yufei; Zhang Jin; Zhou Ruiyu	Ma Yue; Shi Cong; Yin Dehang; Zhang Boheng	Elena Gerasimova; Angelina Melnikova; Aleksandra Shchekoldina; Yana Vorona	Artur Dalaloyan; Dmitriy Lankin; Nikita Nagornyy; Alexy Rostov	Sophia Butler eMjae Frazier; Shilese Jones	Paul Juda; Yul Moldauer; Shane Wiskus

== Medal summary ==
Event	Gold	Silver	Bronze
Team	Team Solidarity; Lu Yufei (CHN); Ma Yue (CHN); Yin Dehang (CHN); Zhang Jin (CHN); Chiaki Hatakeda (JPN); Akari Matsumura (JPN); Wataru Tanigawa (JPN); Kohei Uchimura (JPN); Elena Gerasimova (RUS); Dmitriy Lankin (RUS); Nikita Nagornyy (RUS); Aleksandra Shchekoldina (RUS) eMjae Frazier (USA); Shilese Jones (USA); Paul Juda (USA)	Team Friendship; Liu Jieyu (CHN); Shi Cong (CHN); Zhang Boheng (CHN); Zhou Ruiyu (CHN); Hitomi Hatakeda (JPN); Yuya Kamoto (JPN); Kazuma Kaya (JPN); Asuka Teramoto (JPN); Artur Dalaloyan (RUS); Angelina Melnikova (RUS); Alexey Rostov (RUS); Yana Vorona (RUS); Sophia Butler (USA); Yul Moldauer (USA); Shane Wiskus (USA)	—N/a

== Team scores ==
Only the top 3 scores per apparatus counted towards the team's total score.

Rank	Team	Floor (gymnastics)	Pommel horse	Rings (gymnastics)	Vault (gymnastics)	Parallel bars	Horizontal bar	Uneven bars	Balance beam	Total
1st place, gold medalist(s)	Team Solidarity	81.000	42.400	43.600	87.600	43.600	42.800	39.700	41.900	423.600
1st place, gold medalist(s)	Lu Yufei (CHN)							12.400	13.700	423.600
1st place, gold medalist(s)	Zhang Jin (CHN)	12.500			14.700			13.300	14.400	423.600
1st place, gold medalist(s)	Chiaki Hatakeda (JPN)	13.000			14.200			12.800	13.800	423.600
1st place, gold medalist(s)	Akari Matsumura (JPN)	12.600			13.400			11.400	12.800	423.600
1st place, gold medalist(s)	Elena Gerasimova (RUS)							12.900	12.800	423.600
1st place, gold medalist(s)	Aleksandra Shchekoldina (RUS)	12.600			14.400			13.500		423.600
1st place, gold medalist(s)	eMjae Frazier (USA)				14.400				11.600	423.600
1st place, gold medalist(s)	Shilese Jones (USA)				14.800				12.000	423.600
1st place, gold medalist(s)	Ma Yue (CHN)			14.400						423.600
1st place, gold medalist(s)	Yin Dehang (CHN)		14.200	13.400		14.100				423.600
1st place, gold medalist(s)	Wataru Tanigawa (JPN)	14.200	14.000	13.900	14.000	14.800	14.400			423.600
1st place, gold medalist(s)	Kohei Uchimura (JPN)	13.200	13.300		14.500		15.200			423.600
1st place, gold medalist(s)	Dmitriy Lankin (RUS)	14.400		14.500	14.600	11.400				423.600
1st place, gold medalist(s)	Nikita Nagornyy (RUS)	14.200	14.200	14.700	14.600	14.700	14.200			423.600
1st place, gold medalist(s)	Paul Juda (USA)	13.800	13.400	13.000	14.400	13.200	11.500			423.600
2nd place, silver medalist(s)	Team Friendship	82.300	42.800	43.400	85.100	43.300	41.000	42.800	40.600	421.300
2nd place, silver medalist(s)	Liu Jieyu (CHN)	12.900			13.300			13.300	12.100	421.300
2nd place, silver medalist(s)	Zhou Ruiyu (CHN)	13.100			13.600			14.400	12.500	421.300
2nd place, silver medalist(s)	Hitomi Hatakeda (JPN)	12.700			13.900			13.900	13.700	421.300
2nd place, silver medalist(s)	Asuka Teramoto (JPN)	13.200			13.700			13.500	12.200	421.300
2nd place, silver medalist(s)	Angelina Melnikova (RUS)	13.400			14.700			14.500	14.100	421.300
2nd place, silver medalist(s)	Yana Vorona (RUS)	12.800			14.300				12.800	421.300
2nd place, silver medalist(s)	Sophia Butler (USA)	12.400			13.500				12.500	421.300
2nd place, silver medalist(s)	Shi Cong (CHN)	13.300	12.200	13.500			13.400			421.300
2nd place, silver medalist(s)	Zhang Boheng (CHN)	14.300	13.800	14.700			12.700			421.300
2nd place, silver medalist(s)	Yuya Kamoto (JPN)			14.200		14.600	13.300			421.300
2nd place, silver medalist(s)	Kazuma Kaya (JPN)	14.100	14.800	14.100	14.200	14.700	14.300			421.300
2nd place, silver medalist(s)	Artur Dalaloyan (RUS)		13.200	14.500	14.100	12.900	12.900			421.300
2nd place, silver medalist(s)	Alexey Rostov (RUS)	13.400	13.100	13.900	13.900		13.000			421.300
2nd place, silver medalist(s)	Yul Moldauer (USA)		14.200			14.000	12.100			421.300
2nd place, silver medalist(s)	Shane Wiskus (USA)	14.200	12.700			14.000	12.700			421.300
