= 2019 City of Jesolo Trophy =

Gymnastics competition held in Italy

- Venue: SGA Gymnasium
- Location: Jesolo, Italy
- Dates: March 3–4, 2019

The 2019 City of Jesolo Trophy was the 12th annual Trofeo di Jesolo gymnastics competition held in Jesolo, Italy. Both senior and junior gymnasts were invited to compete.

== Medal table ==
Rank	Nation	Gold	Silver	Bronze	Total
1	United States	6	4	5	15
2	Russia	4	4	2	10
3	China	1	3	1	5
4	Italy	1	1	2	4
5	Belgium	0	0	1	1
Totals (5 entries)		12	12	11	35

== Medalists ==
Event	Gold	Silver	Bronze
Senior
Team all-around	United States (USA); Shilese Jones; Sunisa Lee; Emma Malabuyo; Gabby Perea	China (CHN); Liu Tingting; Qi Qi; Tang Xijing; Zhang Jin	Italy (ITA); Desiree Carofiglio; Alice D'Amato; Asia D'Amato; Elisa Iorio
Individual all-around	Sunisa Lee (USA)	Liu Tingting (CHN)	Emma Malabuyo (USA)
Vault	Asia D'Amato (ITA)	Desiree Carofiglio (ITA)	N/A
Uneven bars	Sunisa Lee (USA)	Tang Xijing (CHN)	Elisa Iorio (ITA)
Balance beam	Liu Tingting (CHN)	Emma Malabuyo (USA)	Sunisa Lee (USA)
Floor exercise	Sunisa Lee (USA)	Emma Malabuyo (USA)	Qi Qi (CHN)
Junior
Team all-around	Russia (RUS); Olga Astafeva; Elena Gerasimova; Viktoria Listunova; Vladislava Urazova	United States (USA); Ciena Alipio; Sophia Butler; Kayla DiCello; Konnor McClain	Belgium (BEL); Stacy Bertrandt; Noemie Louon; Lisa Vaelen; Jutta Verkest
Individual all-around	Konnor McClain (USA)	Vladislava Urazova (RUS)	Elena Gerasimova (RUS)
Vault	Konnor McClain (USA)	Viktoria Listunova (RUS)	Ciena Alipio (USA)
Uneven bars	Vladislava Urazova (RUS)	Elena Gerasimova (RUS)	Konnor McClain (USA)
Balance beam	Viktoria Listunova (RUS)	Ciena Alipio (USA)	Elena Gerasimova (RUS)
Floor exercise	Viktoria Listunova (RUS)	Vladislava Urazova (RUS)	Konnor McClain (USA)

== Results ==
=== Senior ===
==== All-Around ====
Rank	Gymnast	Vault (gymnastics)	Uneven bars	Balance beam	Floor (gymnastics)	Total
1st place, gold medalist(s)	Sunisa Lee (USA)	14.200	14.700	13.233	14.333	56.466
2nd place, silver medalist(s)	Liu Tingting (CHN)	13.767	14.533	13.400	12.867	55.901
3rd place, bronze medalist(s)	Emma Malabuyo (USA)	14.533	13.633	13.500	14.233	55.899
4	Tang Xijing (CHN)	13.800	14.200	13.267	12.900	54.167
5	Alice D'Amato (ITA)	14.633	13.967	12.433	12.700	53.733
6	Zhang Jin (CHN)	13.867	12.733	13.767	13.167	53.534
7	Asia D'Amato (ITA)	14.633	14.033	11.967	12.867	53.500
8	Liu Jingxing (CHN)	13.367	13.667	13.400	13.000	53.434
9	Shilese Jones (USA)	14.700	11.600	13.033	13.800	53.136
10	Desiree Carofiglio (ITA)	14.033	13.933	11.767	13.267	53.000
11	Elisa Iorio (ITA)	13.633	14.067	12.733	12.533	52.966
12	Qi Qi (CHN)	14.500	12.733	12.033	13.533	52.799
13	Gabby Perea (USA)	13.567	12.900	12.367	13.333	52.167
14	Rinne Sakatani (JPN)	13.433	12.133	12.567	12.600	50.733
15	Ayumi Niiyama (JPN)	13.567	12.167	11.600	12.933	50.267
16	Urara Ashikawa (JPN)	11.933	12.400	13.133	12.400	49.866
17	Martina Maggio (ITA)	13.700	10.433	12.233	12.700	49.066

==== Vault ====
Rank	Gymnast	Vault 1	Vault 2	Average
Gold medal	Asia D'Amato (ITA)	14.550	13.850	14.200
Silver medal	Desiree Carofiglio (ITA)	13.400	13.100	13.250

==== Uneven Bars ====
Rank	Gymnast	D Score	E Score	ND	Total
Gold medal	Sunisa Lee (USA)	6.1	8.350		14.450
Silver medal	Tang Xijing (CHN)	6.0	8.350		14.350
Bronze medal	Elisa Iorio (ITA)	5.8	8.500		14.300
4	Liu Tingting (CHN)	6.0	8.250		14.250
5	Alice D'Amato (ITA)	5.7	8.500		13.800
6	Emma Malabuyo (USA)	5.7	8.300		13.500
7	Urara Ashikawa (JPN)	4.6	8.050		12.650
8	Ayumi Niiyama (JPN)	4.5	7.550		12.050

==== Balance Beam ====
Rank	Gymnast	D Score	E Score	ND	Total
Gold medal	Liu Tingting (CHN)	6.2	8.600		14.800
Silver medal	Emma Malabuyo (USA)	6.1	8.300		14.400
Bronze medal	Sunisa Lee (USA)	6.1	8.050		14.150
4	Zhang Jin (CHN)	5.6	8.450		14.050
5	Martina Maggio (ITA)	5.2	8.200		13.400
6	Elisa Iorio (ITA)	5.2	8.150		13.350
7	Urara Ashikawa (JPN)	5.6	7.150		12.750
8	Rinne Sakatani (JPN)	5.2	6.450		11.650

==== Floor Exercise ====
Rank	Gymnast	D Score	E Score	ND	Total
Gold medal	Sunisa Lee (USA)	5.7	8.500		14.200
Silver medal	Emma Malabuyo (USA)	5.6	8.500		14.100
Bronze medal	Qi Qi (CHN)	5.2	8.450	-0.1	13.550
4	Zhang Jin (CHN)	5.4	8.050		13.450
5	Desiree Carofiglio (ITA)	4.7	8.400		13.100
6	Asia D'Amato (ITA)	4.9	7.950		12.850
7	Ayumi Niiyama (JPN)	5.0	7.450		12.450
7	Rinne Sakatani (JPN)	4.7	7.750		12.450

=== Junior ===
==== All-Around ====
Rank	Gymnast	Vault (gymnastics)	Uneven bars	Balance beam	Floor (gymnastics)	Total
1st place, gold medalist(s)	Konnor McClain (USA)	14.800	13.967	14.133	13.267	56.167
2nd place, silver medalist(s)	Vladislava Urazova (RUS)	14.067	14.600	12.700	13.833	55.200
3rd place, bronze medalist(s)	Elena Gerasimova (RUS)	13.333	14.067	14.100	13.500	55.000
4	Viktoria Listunova (RUS)	13.867	13.733	12.767	13.933	54.300
5	Wei Xiaoyuan (CHN)	13.367	12.8677	13.733	13.467	53.434
6	Sophia Butler (USA)	13.833	13.600	12.300	13.433	53.166
7	Olga Astafeva (RUS)	13.833	13.397	12.100	13.133	53.033
8	Ciena Alipio (USA)	14.233	11.800	13.600	13.200	52.833
9	Guan Chenchen (CHN)	13.633	12.833	12.267	13.033	51.766
10	Chiaki Hatakeda (JPN)	13.833	12.167	12.733	12.900	51.633
11	Noemie Louon (BEL)	13.200	13.467	12.467	12.467	51.601
12	Camilla Campagnaro (ITA)	13.633	12.867	12.467	12.267	51.234
13	Hazuki Watanabe (JPN)	13.567	12.167	12.133	12.733	50.600
14	Rinne Sakatani (JPN)	13.433	12.133	12.567	12.600	50.733
15	Chiara Vincenzi (ITA)	13.133	12.667	11.800	12.867	50.467
16	Stacy Bertrandt (BEL)	13.367	11.700	12.733	12.333	50.133
17	Angela Andreoli (ITA)	12.900	12.267	12.100	12.767	50.034
18	Alessia Federici (ITA)	11.700	13.867	11.200	12.933	49.700
19	Lisa Vaelen (BEL)	13.533	12.700	11.000	12.400	49.633
20	India Bandiera (ITA)	13.100	12.000	12.100	12.167	49.367
21	Giulia Controneo (ITA)	12.900	11.867	11.833	12.733	49.333
22	Micol Minotti (ITA)	13.467	11.600	11.900	12.300	49.267
23	Lara Hinseberger (GER)	12.500	122.233	12.033	12.200	48.966
24	Akiho Tokita (JPN)	12.667	11.733	12.400	12.000	48.800
25	Seri Haruguchi (JPN)	11.933	12.267	12.033	11.633	47.866
26	Jutta Verkest (BEL)	12.433	12.667	9.833	12.733	47.666
27	Giorgia Leone (ITA)	13.400	12.500	10.433	11.133	47.466
28	Jasmin Haase (GER)	12.933	11.633	10.633	11.667	46.866
29	Marielle Billet (GER)	12.500	9.800	11.300	12.067	45.667

==== Vault ====
Rank	Gymnast	Vault 1	Vault 2	Average
Gold medal	Konnor McClain (USA)	14.750	14.100	14.425
Silver medal	Viktoria Listunova (RUS)	14.500	13.700	14.100
Bronze medal	Ciena Alipio (USA)	14.100	14.000	14.050
4	Vladislava Urazova (RUS)	13.750	14.050	13.900
5	Camilla Campagnaro (ITA)	13.950	13.800	13.875
6	Guan Chenchen (CHN)	13.500	13.800	13.650
7	Chiaki Hatakeda (JPN)	13.800	13.300	13.550
8	Veronica Mandriota (ITA)	13.450	12.800	13.125

==== Uneven Bars ====
Rank	Gymnast	D Score	E Score	ND	Total
Gold medal	Vladislava Urazova (RUS)	5.9	8.400		14.300
Silver medal	Elena Gerasimova (RUS)	5.6	8.500		14.100
Bronze medal	Konnor McClain (USA)	5.3	8.450		13.750
4	Noemie Louon (BEL)	5.1	8.600		13.700
5	Sophia Butler (USA)	5.5	7.600		13.100
6	Alessia Federici (ITA)	5.1	7.850		12.950
7	Wei Xiaoyuan (CHN)	4.7	8.100		12.800
8	Camilla Campagnaro (ITA)	4.7	7.950		12.650

==== Balance Beam ====
Rank	Gymnast	D Score	E Score	ND	Total
Gold medal	Viktoria Listunova (RUS)	5.8	8.050		13.850
Silver medal	Ciena Alipio (USA)	5.9	7.850		13.750
Bronze medal	Elena Gerasimova (RUS)	5.5	8.200		13.700
4	Chiaki Hatakeda (JPN)	5.2	8.150		13.350
5	Wei Xiaoyuan (CHN)	5.9	7.200		13.100
6	Konnor McClain (USA)	5.8	6.500		12.300
7	Emma Malewski (GER)	4.7	7.000		11.700
8	Stacy Bertrandt (BEL)	3.6	7.850		11.450

==== Floor Exercise ====
Rank	Gymnast	D Score	E Score	ND	Total
Gold medal	Viktoria Listunova (RUS)	5.6	8.700		14.300
Silver medal	Vladislava Urazova (RUS)	5.3	8.600		13.900
Bronze medal	Konnor McClain (USA)	5.0	8.350		13.350
4	Alessia Federici (ITA)	4.9	8.250		13.150
5	Wei Xiaoyuan (CHN)	4.9	8.200		13.100
6	Guan Chenchen (CHN)	4.7	8.300		13.000
7	Chiaki Hatakeda (JPN)	5.4	7.050		12.450
8	Sophia Butler (USA)	5.1	7.550		12.350

== Participants ==
The following federations sent teams:

- Belgium
- China
- Germany
- Japan
- Italy
- Russia
- United States
