= Vladislava Urazova =

Russian artistic gymnast (born 2004)

- Владислава Уразова
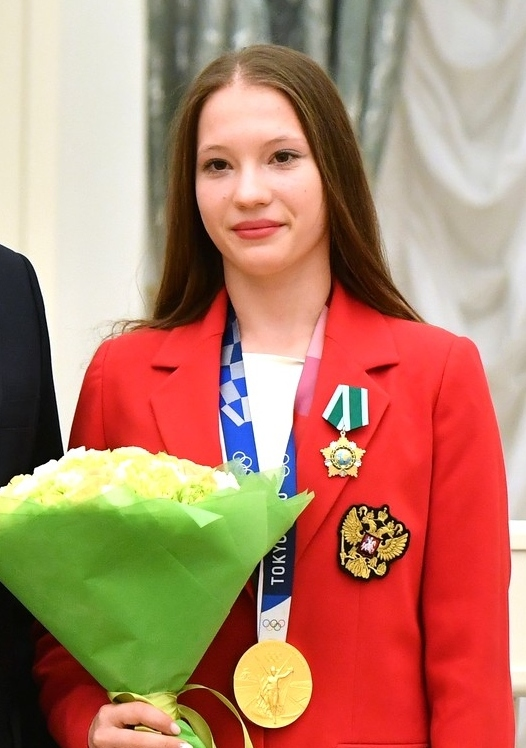
- Urazova at the Kremlin in September 2021

Personal information
- Full name: Vladislava Sergeyevna Urazova
- Nickname: Vlada
- Born: August 14, 2004 (age 22) Rostov-on-Don, Russia

Gymnastics career
- Discipline: Women's artistic gymnastics
- Country represented: Russia; (2017–2024)
- Club: MBU SShOR #2
- Head coach: L.N. Kazakova
- Assistant coach: L.R. Fudimova
Medal record
Women's artistic gymnastics
Representing (Russia) ROC
Olympic Games
| Gold medal – first place | 2020 Tokyo | Team |
Representing Russia
European Championships
| Silver medal – second place | 2021 Basel | Uneven Bars |
Junior World Championships
| Gold medal – first place | 2019 Győr | Team |
| Gold medal – first place | 2019 Györ | Uneven Bars |
| Silver medal – second place | 2019 Győr | All-Around |
| Bronze medal – third place | 2019 Győr | Vault |
FIG World Cup
| Event | 1st | 2nd | 3rd |
|---|---|---|---|
| Apparatus World Cup | 1 | 0 | 0 |
| Total | 1 | 0 | 0 |

Vladislava Sergeyevna Urazova (Russian: Владислава Сергеевна Уразова, IPA: [vlədʲɪˈslavə sʲɪrˈɡʲejɪvnə ʊˈrazəvə]; born 14 August 2004) is a Russian artistic gymnast. She represented the Russian Olympic Committee at the 2020 Summer Olympics and won the gold medal in the team event. She was a member of the team who won gold at the inaugural Junior World Championships. Individually she is the 2019 Junior World Champion and 2021 European silver medalist on the uneven bars.

== Personal life ==
Urazova was born in Rostov-on-Don, Russia on 14 August 2004 and began gymnastics at the age of four. Urazova received the title of Master of Sport in the Russian Federation in 2020.

== Junior gymnastics career ==
=== 2017 ===
Urazova competed at the Russian National Championships in April in the KMS division. She placed fourth in the all-around and on floor exercise but won gold on vault. In December, she competed at the 2017 Voronin Cup where she won silver in the all-around behind Aleksandra Shchekoldina. She won gold on vault and floor exercise.

=== 2018 ===
Urazova competed at the City of Jesolo Trophy in April. She helped Russia win silver in team final behind Italy and individually, she won gold in the all-around ahead of Giorgia Villa of Italy. During event finals, she won gold on balance beam and floor exercise and won bronze on vault, behind Celia Serber of France and Asia D'Amato of Italy. In July, she competed at the Russian National Championships where she won silver in the all-around behind Ksenia Klimenko. She qualified to all four events where she placed first on vault, balance beam, and floor exercise, and placed sixth on uneven bars.

Urazova was selected to represent Russia at the 2018 European Championships alongside Olga Astafyeva, Ksenia Klimenko, Irina Komnova, and Yana Vorona. They won silver in the team final, losing to Italy. In the all-around, Urazova finished in 20th after falling off the uneven bars twice. In event finals, she placed seventh on vault and fifth on floor exercise.

In December, Urazova competed at the Vornin Cup where she won gold in the all-around, vault, and floor exercise, and won silver on uneven bars and balance beam, behind Lee Yun-seo of South Korea and compatriot Elena Gerasimova respectively.

=== 2019 ===
Urazova competed at the City of Jesolo Trophy as the reigning junior all-around champion. She helped Russia win gold ahead of the United States. In the all-around, she won silver behind American Konnor McClain. In event finals, she placed fourth on vault, first on uneven bars, and second on floor exercise. In May, she competed at the Russian National Championships where she won gold in the all-around. She also qualified to all four event finals where she won gold on vault and uneven bars, silver on floor exercise, and placed fourth on balance beam.

In late June, Urazova competed at the inaugural Junior World Championships alongside Viktoria Listunova and Elena Gerasimova. Together, the team won gold, finishing 2.157 points ahead of second place China. Individually, she finished second in the all-around behind compatriot Listunova. She qualified to the balance beam, uneven bars, and vault event finals. On the first day of event finals, she won bronze on vault behind Kayla DiCello of the US and Jennifer Gadirova of Great Britain and won gold on the uneven bars after upgrading her routine to beat out top qualifier Listunova. On the second day, she placed fourth on balance beam behind Gerasimova, Wei Xiaoyuan of China, and DiCello.

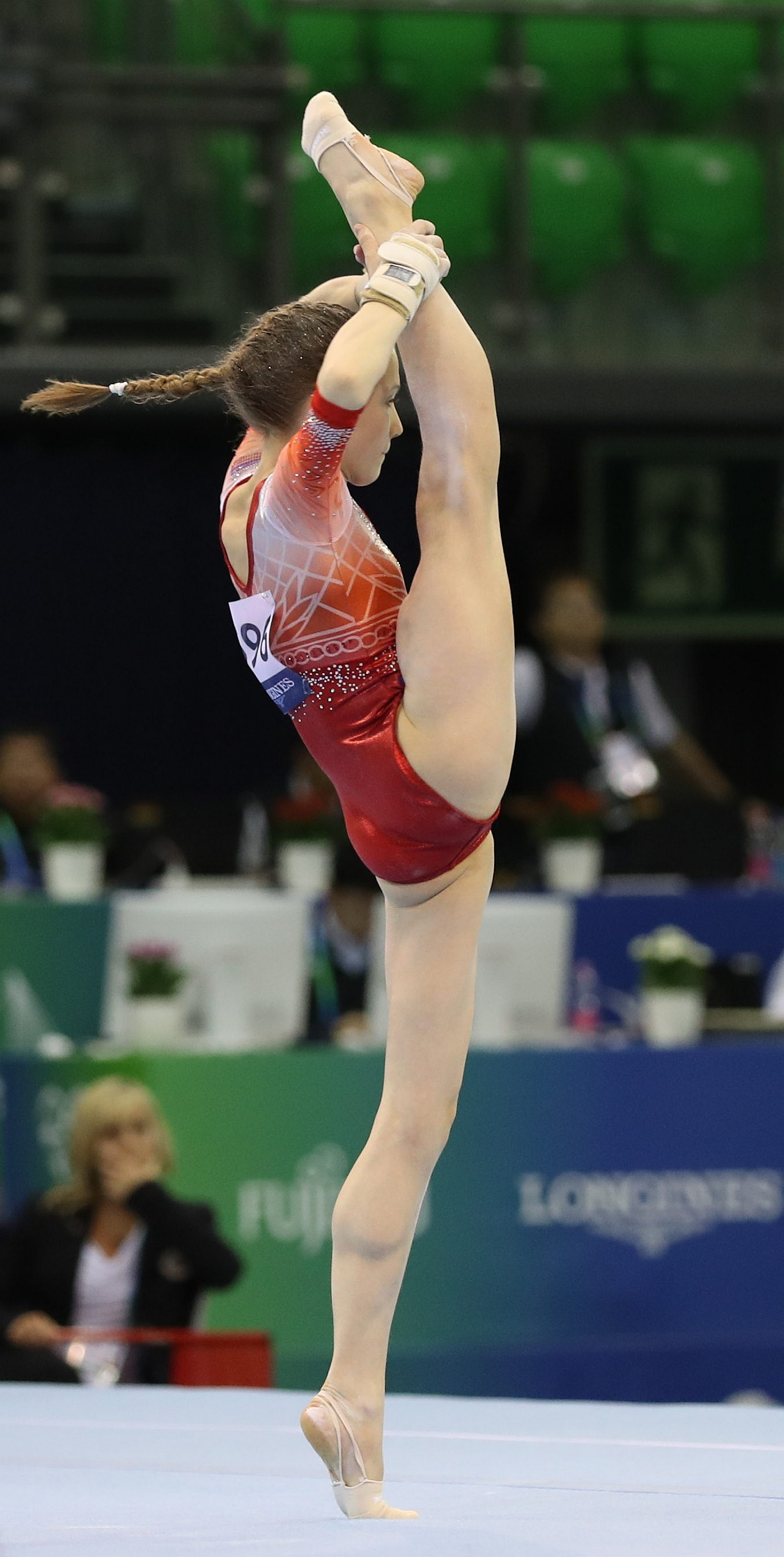
Team/All-Around final

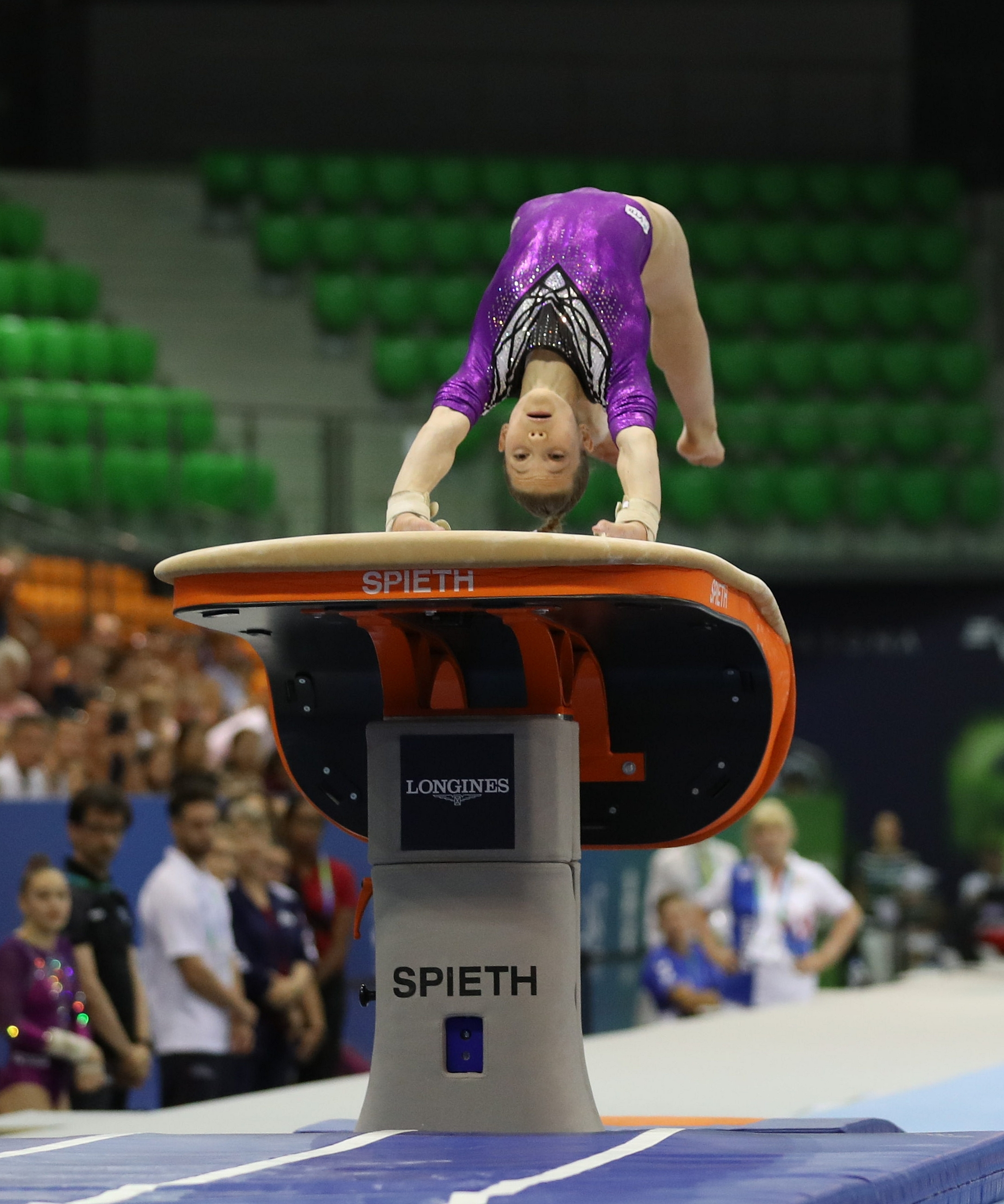
Vault final

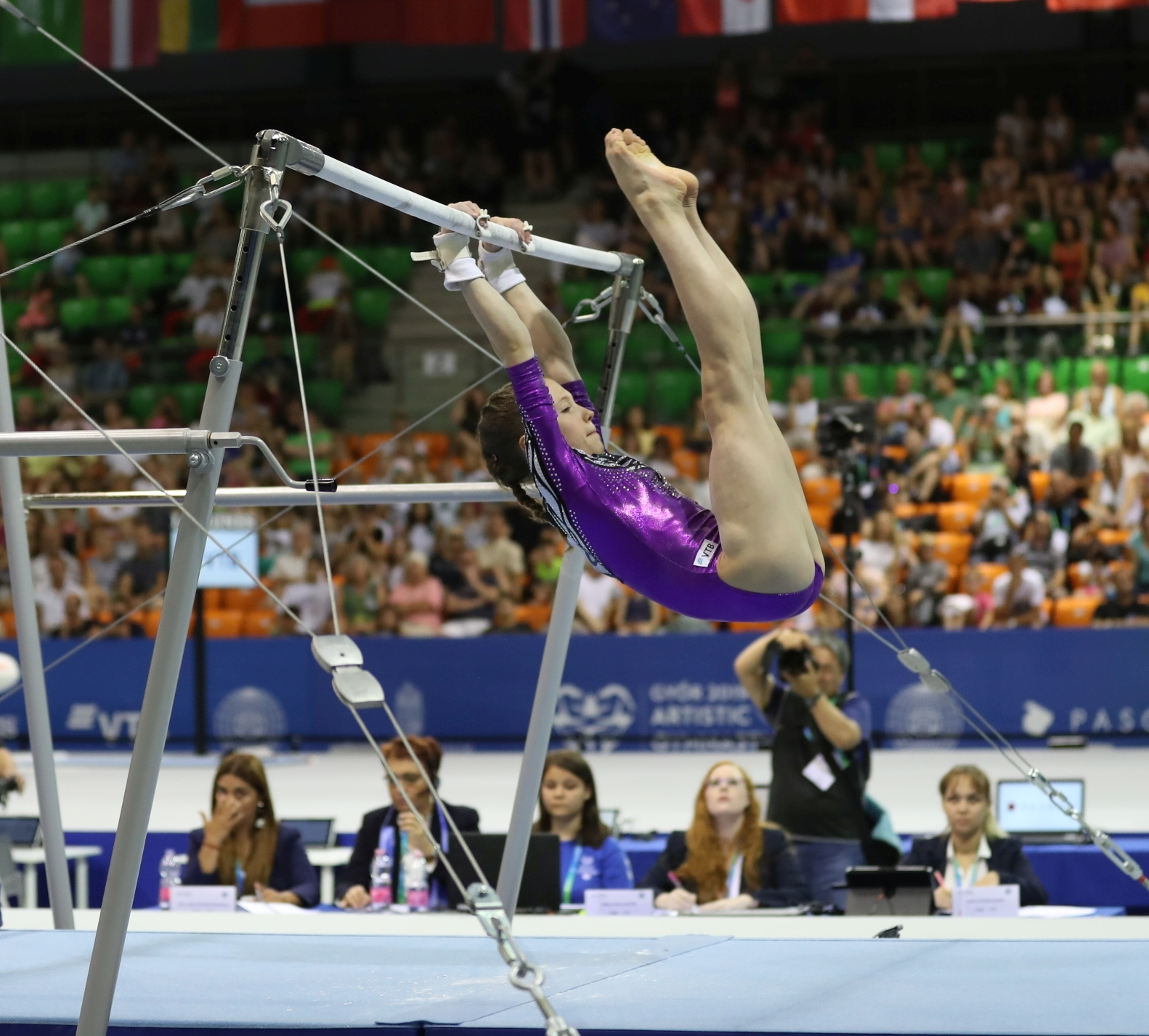
Uneven Bars Final

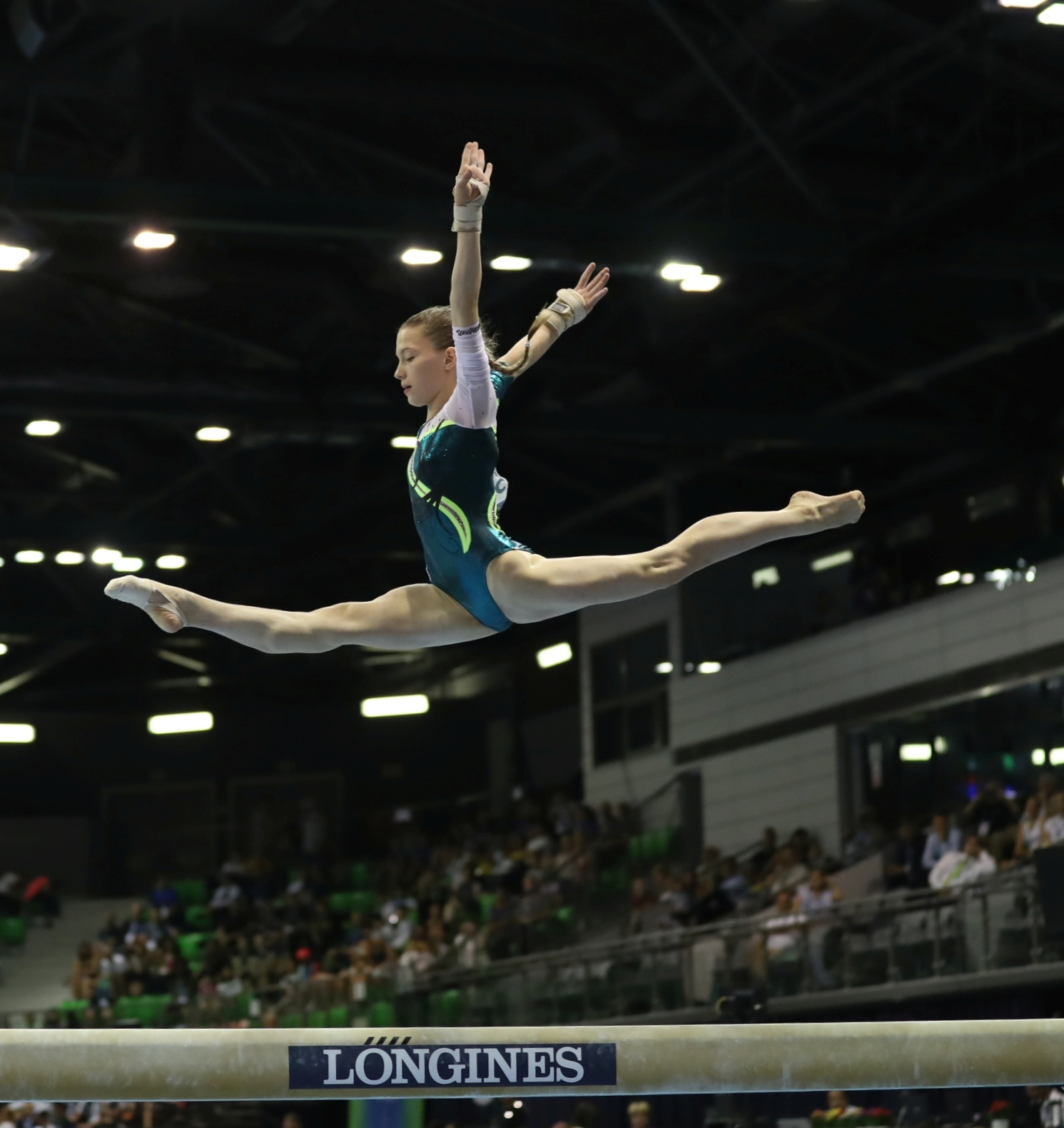
Balance Beam Final

Urazova at the 2019 Junior World Championships

In August, Urazova competed at the Russian Cup, where, although she was a junior, she competed against senior gymnasts. After two days of competition, she won the all-around competition, finishing over four points ahead of second place finisher Angelina Melnikova. On the first day of event finals, Urazova won silver on uneven bars, finishing behind 2015 World co-champion on the event Daria Spiridonova. On the second day of event finals, she won bronze on balance beam, finishing behind fellow juniors Yana Vorona and Elena Gerasimova and won gold on floor exercise, finishing ahead of Gerasimova and senior competitor Lilia Akhaimova.

In late November, Urazova competed at the Top Gym tournament in Charleroi, Belgium on a team that was composed of compatriot Gerasimova and Canadians Natasha Lopez and Jenna Sartoretto. She won gold in the all-around and the team final and on vault, uneven bars, and floor exercise.

== Senior gymnastics career ==
=== 2021 ===
Urazova turned senior in 2020 but did not compete during the year due to the COVID-19 pandemic. She made her senior debut at the 2021 Russian National Championships. She finished qualifications with a 56.299, the second highest score of the day behind Viktoria Listunova. During finals, she earned a 57.365, which was the highest score of the day. However, her two day total was less than Listunova's and therefore, Urazova finished second. During event finals, Urazova won gold on the uneven bars, bronze on floor exercise behind Angelina Melnikova and Listunova, and placed seventh on the balance beam after multiple falls.

In April, it was announced that Urazova would make her senior international debut at the European Championships in Basel alongside Melnikova, Listunova, and Elena Gerasimova. During qualifications, Urazova finished third in the all-around and second on uneven bars; however, Melnikova and Listunova finished higher in the all-around and Urazova, therefore, did not qualify for the final. During event finals, Urazova earned silver on the uneven bars behind Melnikova.

Urazova competed at the Russian Cup in June. During qualifications, she finished in second behind Melnikova. During the all-around final, she once again finished second but this time behind Listunova. After the competition, Valentina Rodionenko, the senior coach of the Russian national artistic gymnastics team, announced that Urazova would be on the Olympic Team along with Melnikova and Listunova.

At the Olympic Games, Urazova qualified to the all-around and balance beam finals; she scored high enough to qualify to the uneven bars final but did not due to two-per-country limitations and Anastasia Ilyankova and Melnikova scoring higher. Additionally, she helped the Russian Olympic Committee qualify to the team final in a surprise first place, ahead of the United States team. During the team final Simone Biles withdrew after vault; Urazova competed on all four apparatuses. Although Urazova and teammate Melnikova fell off the balance beam, the Russian team performed well on all other routines and finished in first place, over three points ahead of the second place American team. During the all-around final Urazova hit all four of her routines and recorded the highest balance beam score of the day; however, she finished fourth behind Sunisa Lee of the United States, Rebeca Andrade of Brazil, and compatriot Melnikova.

In September, it was announced that Urazova would compete at the upcoming World Championships alongside Maria Minaeva, Yana Vorona, and Olympic teammate Melnikova. In qualifications, she fell on her double twisting Yurchenko, which was also downgraded to a 1.5 twisting Yurchenko, but came back strong to qualify fifth for the all-around final. Additionally, she qualified for the uneven bars and floor exercise finals. During the finals, she placed fourth in the all-around and on floor exercise and seventh on uneven bars.

=== 2022 ===
Urazova competed at the Doha World Cup in early March. She qualified to the balance beam and floor exercise finals. Urazova won gold on the balance beam and placed fourth on floor exercise.

== Selected competitive skills ==
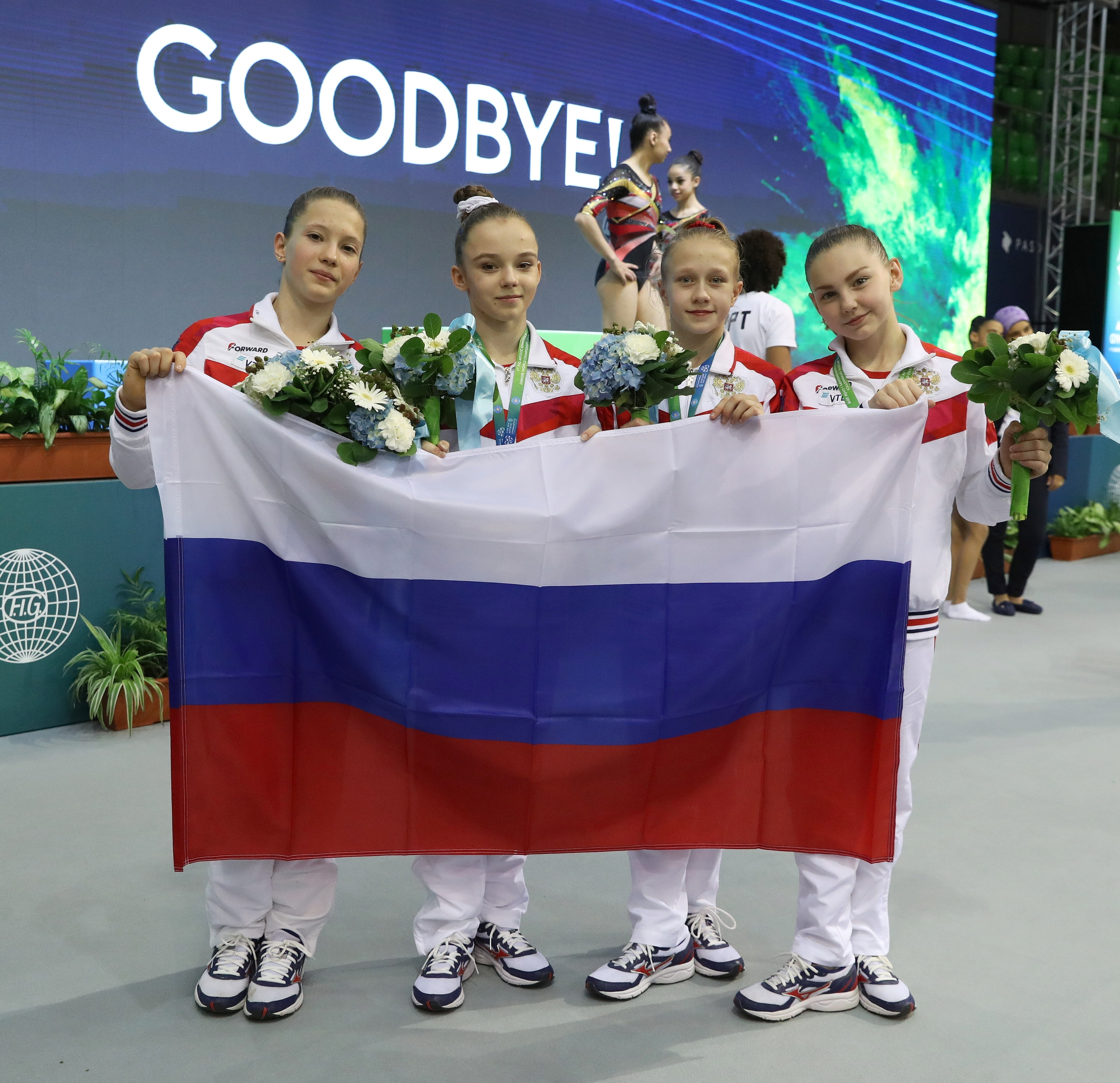
Russian team at the 2019 Junior World Championships

| Apparatus | Name | Description | Difficulty (Note: Valid for the 2017–2021 Code of Points) | Performed |
|---|---|---|---|---|
| Vault | Baitova | Yurchenko entry, laid out salto backwards with two twists | 5.4 | 2021 |
| Uneven Bars | Inbar 1/1 | Inbar Stalder to full (1/1) pirouette | E | 2021 |
| Uneven Bars | Van Leeuwen | Toe-on Shaposhnikova transition with ½ twist to high bar | E | 2021 |
| Uneven Bars | Komova II | Inbar Shaposhnikova transition to high bar | E | 2021 |
| Uneven Bars | Piked Jaeger | Reverse grip swing to piked salto forwards to catch high bar | E | 2021 |
| Balance Beam | Mitchell | 1080° (3/1) turn in tuck stand on one leg | E | 2021 |
| Floor Exercise | Mitchell | 1080° (3/1) turn in tuck stand on one leg | E | 2021 |
| Floor Exercise | Triple Twist | Triple-twisting (3/1) laid out salto backward | E | 2021 |
| Floor Exercise | Mustafina | 1080° (3/1) turn w/ leg held in 180° split | E | 2021 |

== Competitive history ==
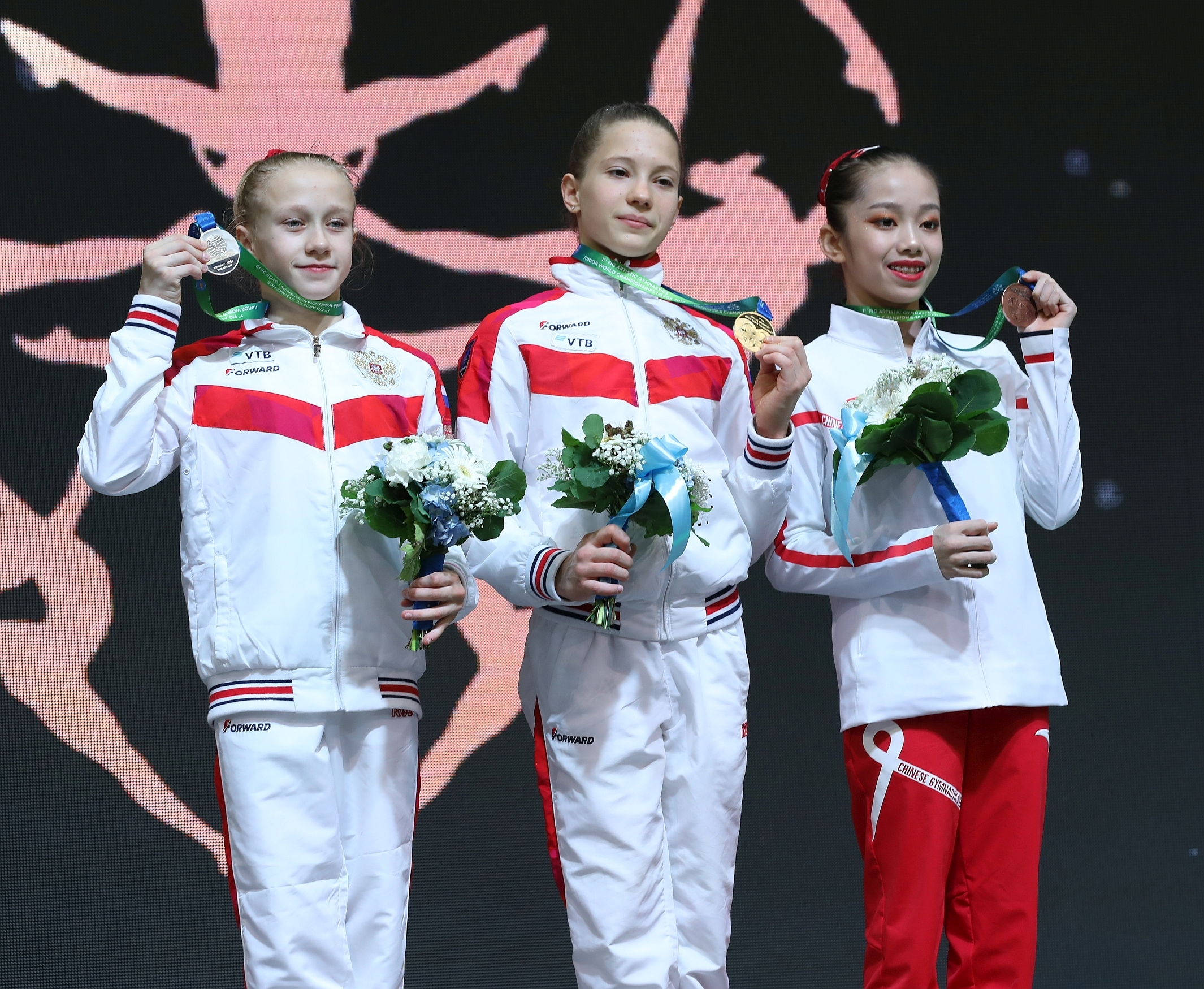
Urazova (center) on the uneven bars podium at the 2019 Junior World Championships

| Year | Event | Team | AA | VT | UB | BB | FX |
Junior
| 2017 | Russian Championships | | 4 | 1st place, gold medalist(s) | | | 4 |
| 2017 | Voronin Cup | | 2nd place, silver medalist(s) | 1st place, gold medalist(s) | | | 1st place, gold medalist(s) |
| 2018 | City of Jesolo Trophy | 1st place, gold medalist(s) | 1st place, gold medalist(s) | 3rd place, bronze medalist(s) | | 1st place, gold medalist(s) | 1st place, gold medalist(s) |
| 2018 | Russian Championships | | 1st place, gold medalist(s) | | 2nd place, silver medalist(s) | 4 | 4 |
| 2018 | European Championships | 2nd place, silver medalist(s) | 20 | 7 | | | 5 |
| 2018 | Voronin Cup | | 1st place, gold medalist(s) | 1st place, gold medalist(s) | 2nd place, silver medalist(s) | 2nd place, silver medalist(s) | 1st place, gold medalist(s) |
| 2019 | City of Jesolo Trophy | 1st place, gold medalist(s) | 2nd place, silver medalist(s) | 4 | 1st place, gold medalist(s) | | 2nd place, silver medalist(s) |
| 2019 | Russian Championships | | 1st place, gold medalist(s) | 1st place, gold medalist(s) | 1st place, gold medalist(s) | 4 | 2nd place, silver medalist(s) |
| 2019 | Junior World Championships | 1st place, gold medalist(s) | 2nd place, silver medalist(s) | 3rd place, bronze medalist(s) | 1st place, gold medalist(s) | 4 | |
| 2019 | Russian Cup | | 1st place, gold medalist(s) | | 2nd place, silver medalist(s) | 3rd place, bronze medalist(s) | 1st place, gold medalist(s) |
| 2019 | Top Gym | 1st place, gold medalist(s) | 1st place, gold medalist(s) | 1st place, gold medalist(s) | 1st place, gold medalist(s) | | 1st place, gold medalist(s) |
Senior
| 2021 | National Championships | 2nd place, silver medalist(s) | 2nd place, silver medalist(s) | | 1st place, gold medalist(s) | 7 | 3rd place, bronze medalist(s) |
| 2021 | European Championships | | | | 2nd place, silver medalist(s) | | |
| 2021 | Russian Cup | | 2nd place, silver medalist(s) | | 1st place, gold medalist(s) | 7 | 1st place, gold medalist(s) |
| 2021 | Olympic Games | 1st place, gold medalist(s) | 4 | | | 8 | |
| 2021 | World Championships | —N/a | 4 | | 7 | | 4 |
| 2022 | Doha World Cup | | | | | 1st place, gold medalist(s) | 4 |
| 2022 | National Championships | 4 | 3rd place, bronze medalist(s) | | 3rd place, bronze medalist(s) | 2nd place, silver medalist(s) | 8 |
| 2022 | Russian Cup | | 2nd place, silver medalist(s) | 4 | 4 | 6 | |
| 2022 | Spartakiade | 4 | 3rd place, bronze medalist(s) | 4 | | 5 | 3rd place, bronze medalist(s) |
| 2023 | National Championships | 7 | | | | 4 | |
| 2023 | Russian Cup | | | | 7 | | |
