= 2021 Russian Cup =

Gymnastics competition in Russia

Russian Cup
- Location: Novosibirsk, Russia
- Date: June 6–12, 2021

The 2021 Russian Cup was held in Novosibirsk, Russia between 6 and 12 June 2021.

== Medalists ==
Event	Gold	Silver	Bronze
Women
All-around	Viktoria Listunova	Vladislava Urazova	Angelina Melnikova
Vault	Lilia Akhaimova	Angelina Melnikova	Julia Biryulya
Uneven bars	Vladislava Urazova	Angelina Melnikova	Anastasia Ilyankova
Balance beam	Varvara Zubova	Elena Gerasimova	Angelina Melnikova
Floor	Vladislava Urazova	Angelina Melnikova	Lilia Akhaimova
Men
All-around	Nikita Nagornyy	Aleksandr Kartsev	Nikita Ignatyev
Floor	Ivan Stretovich	Aleksandr Kartsev	Mukhammadzhon Iakubov
Pommel horse	David Belyavskiy	Vladislav Poliashov	Nikita Nagornyy
Rings	Denis Ablyazin	Grigory Klimentev	Alexey Rostov
Vault	Nikita Nagornyy	Denis Ablyazin	Vladislav Novokshonov
Parallel bars	David Belyavskiy	Nikita Nagornyy	Ivan Kulyak
High bar	Ivan Stretovich	Nikita Nagornyy	Alexey Rostov

== Olympic team selection ==
After the conclusion of the competition, the teams and individuals were selected to represent Russian Olympic Committee athletes at the 2020 Summer Olympics. For the men: Nikita Nagornyy, David Belyavskiy, Aleksandr Kartsev, and Artur Dalaloyan were named to the four person team with Vladislav Poliashov and Denis Ablyazin selected to compete as individuals. For the women: Angelina Melnikova, Viktoria Listunova, and Vladislava Urazova were named to the four person team with the fourth spot going to either Elena Gerasimova or Lilia Akhaimova. The athlete not chosen for the team went as an individual along with Anastasia Ilyankova. Prior to the Olympics, Ablyazin was put on the men's team and Kartsev competed as an individual and Akhaimova was selected to compete on the team while Gerasimova competed as an individual.
