= Viktoria Listunova =

Russian artistic gymnast (born 2005)

- Виктория Листунова
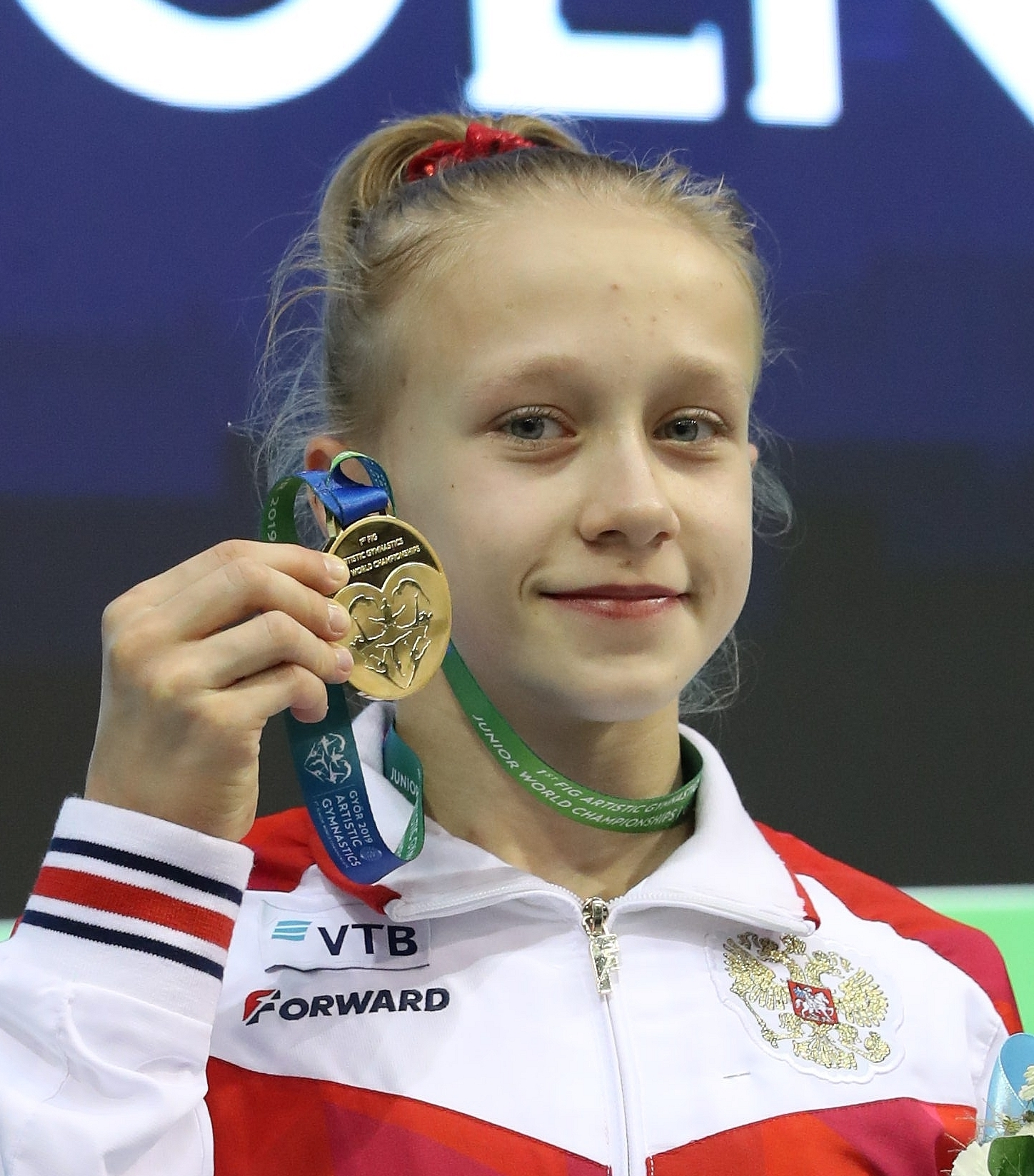
- Listunova at the 2019 Junior World Championships

Personal information
- Full name: Viktoria Viktorovna Listunova
- Nickname: Vika
- Born: May 12, 2005 (age 21) Moscow, Russia

Gymnastics career
- Discipline: Women's artistic gymnastics
- Country represented: Russia; (2018–present)
- Club: Sambo 70 Olympia
- Head coach: Olga Petrovicheva
- Assistant coaches: Gennady Petrovichev; Raisa Ganina
Medal record
Women's artistic gymnastics
Representing (Russia) ROC
Olympic Games
Gold medal – first place	2020 Tokyo	Team
Representing Russia
European Championships
Gold medal – first place	2021 Basel	All-Around
Junior World Championships
Gold medal – first place	2019 Győr	Team
Gold medal – first place	2019 Győr	All-Around
Gold medal – first place	2019 Győr	Floor Exercise
Silver medal – second place	2019 Győr	Uneven Bars
FIG World Cup
Event	1st	2nd	3rd
Apparatus World Cup	1	0	1
Total	1	0	1

Viktoria Viktorovna Listunova (Russian: Виктория Викторовна Листунова, IPA: [vʲɪˈktorʲɪjə lʲɪstʊˈnovə]; born 12 May 2005) is a Russian artistic gymnast. She represented the Russian Olympic Committee at the 2020 Summer Olympics and won the gold medal in the team event. She was a member of the team that won gold at the inaugural Junior World Championships. Individually, she is the 2019 Junior World all-around and floor exercise champion, the 2021 European all-around champion, and the 2021, 2022, and 2023 Russian National Champion.

== Personal life ==
Listunova was born in Moscow, Russia on 12 May 2005. In April 2018, she appeared on the Russian talent show Blue Bird. In 2019, she received the title of Candidate for Master of Sport in the Russian Federation.

On 18 March 2022 Listunova participated in the Moscow rally in support of the Russian invasion of Ukraine, wearing a Z symbol.

== Junior gymnastics career ==
=== 2018 ===
Listunova made her international debut at International Gymnix in March 2018 where she placed third in the all-around behind Zoé Allaire-Bourgie of Canada and Asia D'Amato of Italy. During event finals she placed eighth on vault, second on uneven bars behind compatriot Elena Gerasimova, sixth on balance beam, and won gold on floor exercise. In June she competed at the Russian National Championships as an Espoir. She won gold in the all-around, on uneven bars, and on floor exercise. She won silver on vault behind Angelina Kosynkina and won bronze on balance beam behind Yulia Nikolayeva and Sofia Koroleva. In December Listunova competed at the 2018 Voronin Cup where she won silver in the all-around behind Vladislava Urazova. She won silver on floor exercise behind Urazova, bronze on vault behind Urazova and Darya Yassinskaya of Kazakhstan, and placed fourth on uneven bars.

=== 2019 ===
Listunova competed at the 2019 City of Jesolo Trophy. She helped Russia win gold ahead of the United States. In event finals she placed second on vault and first on balance beam and floor exercise. In May she competed at the Russian National Championships where she won silver in the all-around behind Vladislava Urazova. She also qualified three event finals where she won silver on vault, gold on floor exercise, and bronze on balance beam.

In late June Listunova competed at the inaugural Junior World Championships alongside Vladislava Urazova and Elena Gerasimova. Together the team won gold, finishing 2.157 points ahead of second place China. Individually she won gold in the all-around and qualified to the floor exercise, uneven bars, and vault event finals. On the first day of event finals she finished eighth on vault and won silver on uneven bars behind teammate Urazova. On the second day of event finals Listunova won gold on floor exercise and was the only competitor to score above 14.

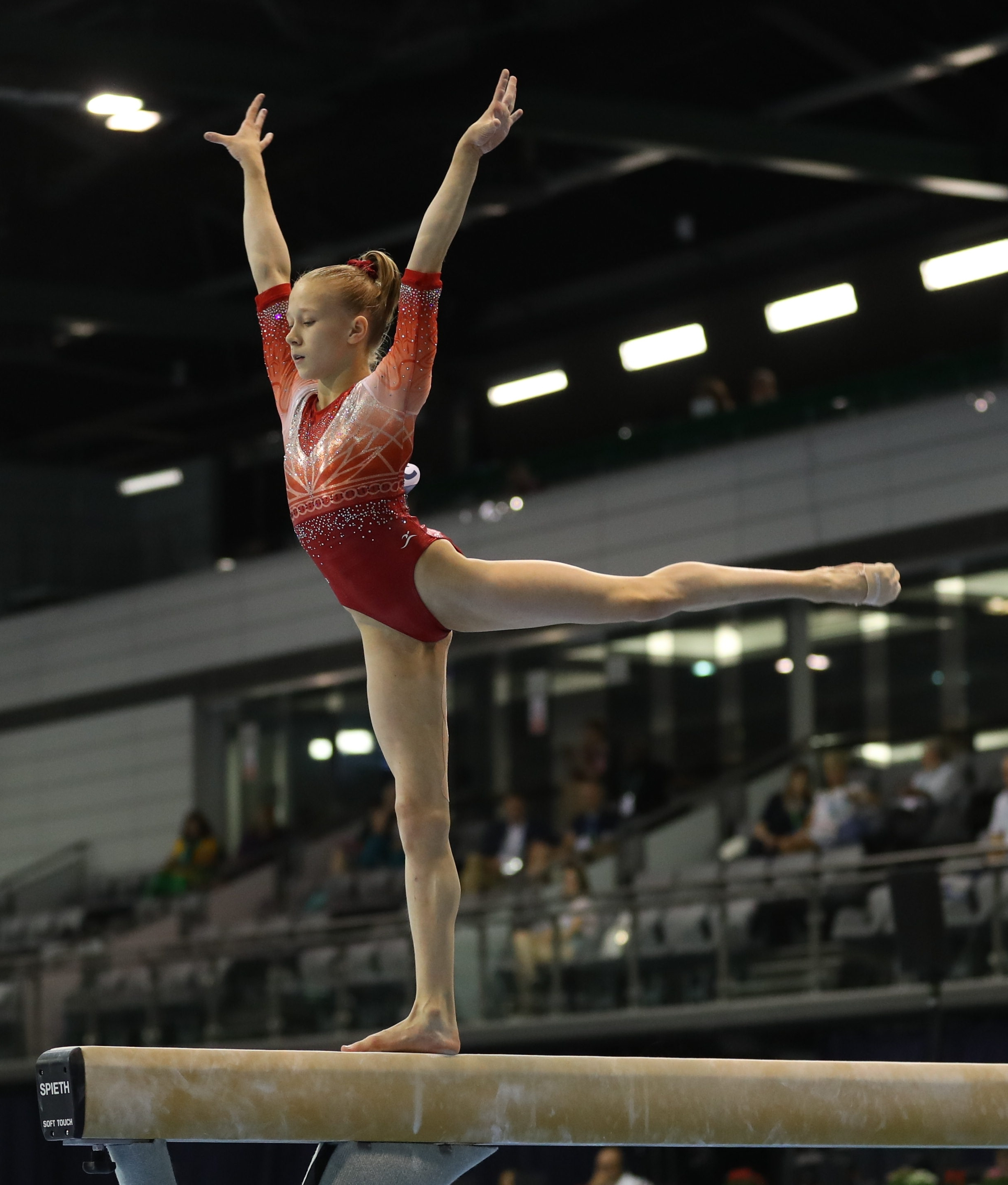
Team / All-Around Final

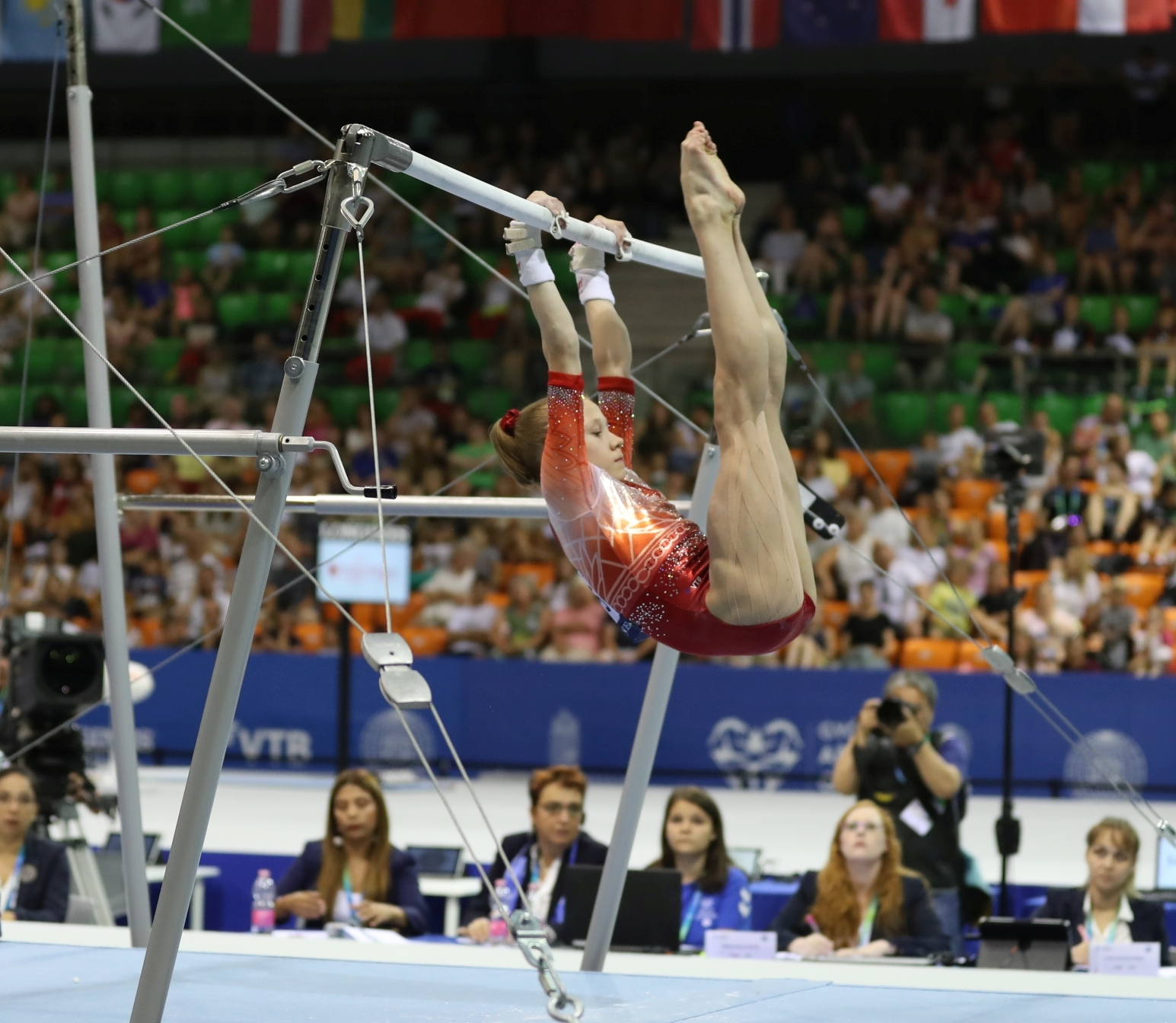
Uneven Bars Final

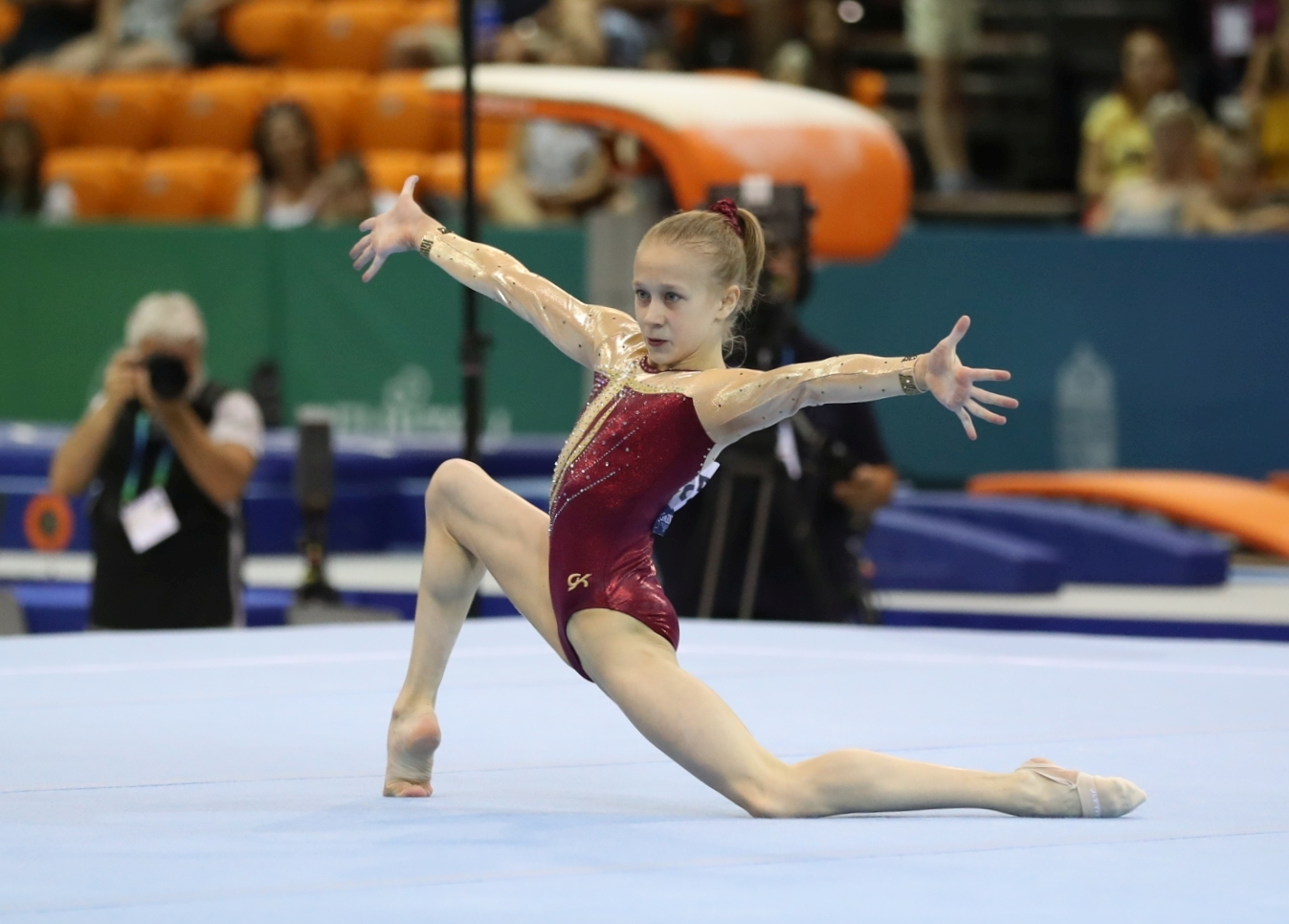
Floor Exercise Final

Listunova at the 2019 Junior World Championships

In July Listunova competed at the 2019 European Youth Olympic Festival alongside Iana Vorona and Irina Komnova. While there she helped Russia win the gold in the team final and individually she qualified first in the all-around. During the all-around final she once again placed first, finishing ahead of Ondine Achampong of Great Britain and Vorona. During event finals she won gold on vault, uneven bars, and floor exercise and finished seventh on balance beam after falling on her wolf turn.

In November Listunova competed at Elite Gym Massilia where she placed second in the all-around, behind of Vorona, first on floor exercise, and fifth on balance beam.

== Senior gymnastics career ==
=== 2021 ===
Listunova turned senior in 2021 and made her senior debut at the Russian National Championships in March. She finished qualifications with a score of 57.566, the highest of the day. During the all-around final she earned a 56.598, the second highest of the day behind Vladislava Urazova; however her two day total was higher and therefore Listunova became the Russian National Champion. Listunova was the only athlete to qualify to all four event finals. She won gold on balance beam and silver on uneven bars (behind Urazova), vault, and floor exercise (behind Angelina Melnikova).

In April it was announced that Listunova would make her senior international debut at the European Championships in Basel alongside Melnikova, Urazova, and Elena Gerasimova. During qualifications Listunova finished second in the all-around behind Melnikova. Due to finishing top 2 amongst individuals who did not help qualify a team or qualify individually to the Olympic Games, Listunova qualified an additional quota for Russia. Listunova also qualified to the floor exercise final. During the all-around final Listunova won the all-around gold medal, placing ahead of Melnikova and Jessica Gadirova. Listunova became only the second woman to have won the all-around at the European championships as a first-year senior, a feat only ever achieved by Romania's Nadia Comăneci in 1975.

Listunova competed at the Russian Cup in June. During qualifications she finished in third behind Melnikova and Urazova after falling off the balance beam and during floor exercise. During the all-around final she managed to pull ahead and finished in first place. After the competition Valentina Rodionenko, the senior coach of the Russian national artistic gymnastics team, announced that Listunova would be on the Olympic Team along with Melnikova and Urazova.

At the Olympic Games Listunova qualified to the floor exercise final. She scored highly enough to qualify to the all-around and uneven bars finals, but did not due to two-per-country limitations. Additionally she helped the Russian Olympic Committee to qualify to the team final in a surprise first place, ahead of the United States team. During the team final Simone Biles withdrew after vault; Listunova competed on all events except vault. Although teammates Melnikova and Urazova fell off the balance beam, the Russian team performed well on all other routines and finished in first place, over three points ahead of the second-place American team. During the floor exercise final, Listunova stepped out of bounds on her first tumbling pass and fell during her second, resulting in an eighth-place finish.

In September it was revealed that Listunova would forgo competing at the upcoming World Championships in order to heal from an elbow injury.

=== 2022–2025 ===
Listunova competed at the Doha World Cup in early March. She qualified to the vault and uneven bars finals in first place and was the second reserve for the balance beam final. During event finals Listunova placed third on vault behind Oksana Chusovitina and Csenge Bácskay and won gold on uneven bars.

While in Doha it was announced that starting March 7 Russian and Belarusian athletes would be banned from taking part in FIG-sanctioned competitions. Throughout the remainder of 2022 through 2024 Listunova only competed domestically.

Starting in 2025 the Artistic Gymnastics Federation of Russia began letting their athletes to apply for neutral status, allowing them to return to international competition. However, Listunova's application for neutral status was rejected.

=== 2026 ===
In May 2026, World Gymnastics officially ended the ban on Russian gymnasts, allowing Listunova to return to international competition. She was selected to make her comeback at the 2026 European Championships in Zagreb, Croatia alongside Angelina Melnikova, Liudmila Roshchina, Anna Kalmykova, and Elizaveta Us. However, a week before the start of the competition, the Croatian government denied visas for Listunova as well as Melnikova and Kalmykova, preventing them from competing. Days later, after the Russian Ministry of Foreign Affairs worked with the Croatian Gymnastics Union as well as European Gymnastics, Melnikova and Kalmykova were granted visas while Listunova's visa was still denied.

Listunova was selected to represent Russia at the 2026 World Championships. Four days before the official start date of the competition, the Netherlands denied her visa along with those of Kalmykova and Melnikova.

== Selected competitive skills ==
Apparatus	Name	Description	Difficulty (Note: Valid for the 2017–2021 Code of Points)	Performed
Vault	Baitova	Yurchenko entry, laid out salto backwards with two twists	5.4	2021–22
Uneven Bars	Inbar 1/1	Inbar Stalder to full (1/1) pirouette	E	2021–22
Uneven Bars	Van Leeuwen	Toe-on Shaposhnikova transition with ½ twist to high bar	E	2021
Uneven Bars	Chow ½	Stalder Shaposhnikova transition with ½ twist to high bar	E	2021–22
Uneven Bars	Komova II	Inbar Shaposhnikova transition to high bar	E	2021–22
Uneven Bars	Ricna	Stalder to counter reversed straddled hecht over high bar	E	2021–22
Uneven Bars	Fabrichnova	Dismount: Double-twisting (2/1) double tucked salto backwards	F	2021
Balance Beam	Mitchell	1080° (3/1) turn in tuck stand on one leg	E	2021
Floor Exercise	Mitchell	1080° (3/1) turn in tuck stand on one leg	E	2021
Floor Exercise	Triple Twist	Triple-twisting (3/1) laid out salto backward	E	2021
Floor Exercise	Double Layout	Double laid out salto backwards	F	2021

== Competitive history ==
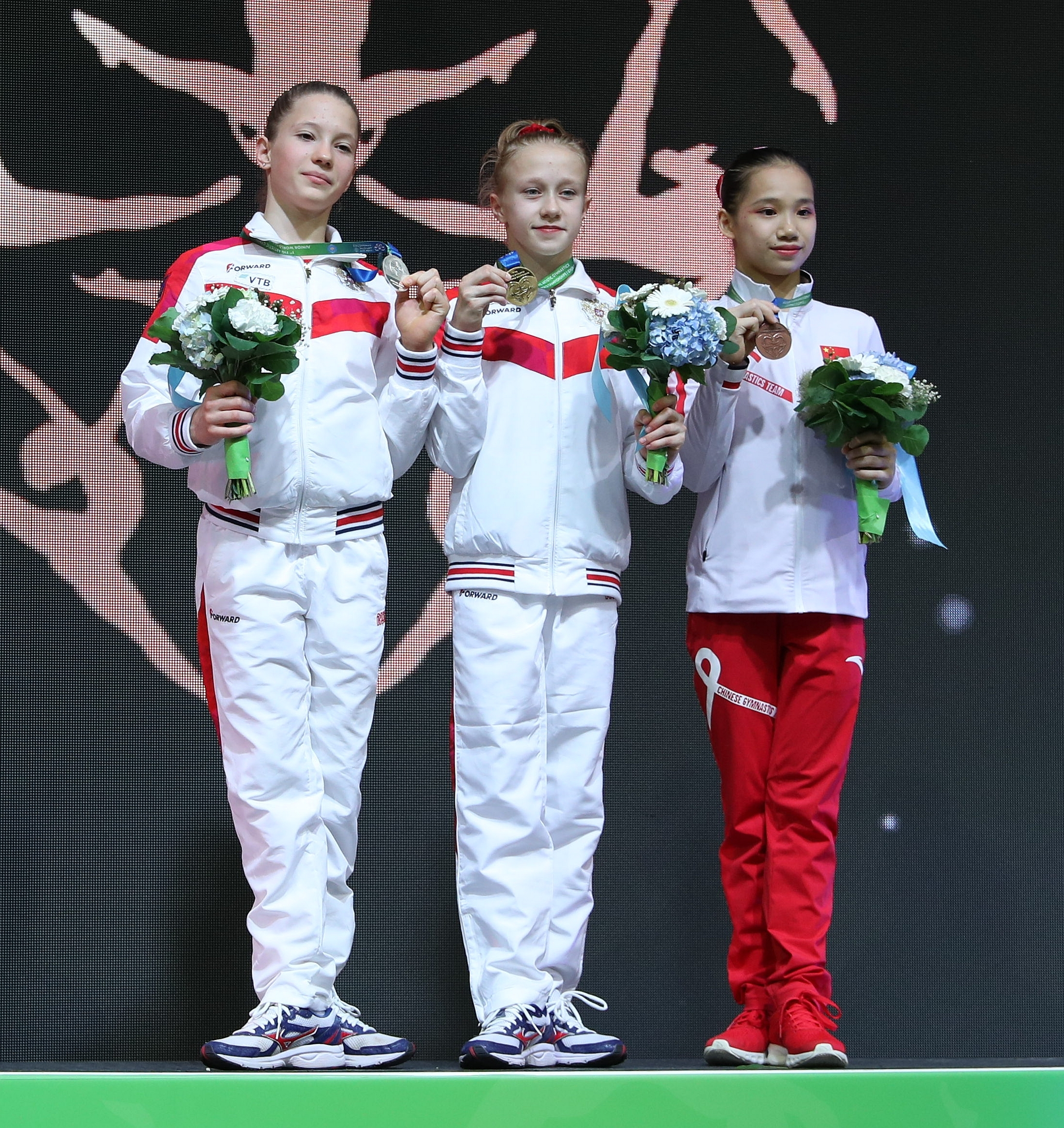
Listunova (center) on the All-Around podium at the 2019 Junior World Championships

Competitive history of Viktoria Listunova at the junior level
Year	Event	Team	AA	VT	UB	BB	FX
2018	International Gymnix		3rd place, bronze medalist(s)	8	2nd place, silver medalist(s)	6	1st place, gold medalist(s)
2018	Russian Championships		1st place, gold medalist(s)	2nd place, silver medalist(s)	1st place, gold medalist(s)	3rd place, bronze medalist(s)	1st place, gold medalist(s)
2018	Voronin Cup		2nd place, silver medalist(s)	3rd place, bronze medalist(s)	4		2nd place, silver medalist(s)
2019	City of Jesolo Trophy	1st place, gold medalist(s)	4	2nd place, silver medalist(s)		1st place, gold medalist(s)	1st place, gold medalist(s)
2019	Russian Championships		2nd place, silver medalist(s)	2nd place, silver medalist(s)		3rd place, bronze medalist(s)	1st place, gold medalist(s)
2019	Junior World Championships	1st place, gold medalist(s)	1st place, gold medalist(s)	8	2nd place, silver medalist(s)		1st place, gold medalist(s)
2019	Euro Youth Olympic Festival	1st place, gold medalist(s)	1st place, gold medalist(s)	1st place, gold medalist(s)	1st place, gold medalist(s)	7	1st place, gold medalist(s)
2019	Elite Gym Massilia		2nd place, silver medalist(s)			5	1st place, gold medalist(s)

Competitive history of Viktoria Listunova at the senior level
Year	Event	Team	AA	VT	UB	BB	FX
2021	National Championships	1st place, gold medalist(s)	1st place, gold medalist(s)	2nd place, silver medalist(s)	2nd place, silver medalist(s)	1st place, gold medalist(s)	2nd place, silver medalist(s)
2021	European Championships		1st place, gold medalist(s)				7
2021	Russian Cup		1st place, gold medalist(s)		4	8	7
2021	Olympic Games	1st place, gold medalist(s)				R2	8
2022	Doha World Cup			3rd place, bronze medalist(s)	1st place, gold medalist(s)		
2022	National Championships	2nd place, silver medalist(s)	1st place, gold medalist(s)	1st place, gold medalist(s)	4	7	1st place, gold medalist(s)
2022	Russian Cup				1st place, gold medalist(s)		
2022	Spartakiade	1st place, gold medalist(s)	1st place, gold medalist(s)	1st place, gold medalist(s)	1st place, gold medalist(s)	3rd place, bronze medalist(s)	2nd place, silver medalist(s)
2022	Voronin Cup		2nd place, silver medalist(s)	2nd place, silver medalist(s)	1st place, gold medalist(s)		1st place, gold medalist(s)
2023	National Championships	1st place, gold medalist(s)	1st place, gold medalist(s)	1st place, gold medalist(s)	1st place, gold medalist(s)	7	1st place, gold medalist(s)
2023	Russian Cup		1st place, gold medalist(s)	3rd place, bronze medalist(s)	1st place, gold medalist(s)	1st place, gold medalist(s)	1st place, gold medalist(s)
2024	Russian Championships		3rd place, bronze medalist(s)		2nd place, silver medalist(s)	9	2nd place, silver medalist(s)
2024	Voronin Cup	1st place, gold medalist(s)					1st place, gold medalist(s)
2025	Russian Championships	2nd place, silver medalist(s)			2nd place, silver medalist(s)		
2026	Russian Cup	1st place, gold medalist(s)			1st place, gold medalist(s)		
2026	Russian Championships	1st place, gold medalist(s)			4	7	
2026	Spartakiade	2nd place, silver medalist(s)			1st place, gold medalist(s)	3rd place, bronze medalist(s)	
