= Elena Gerasimova =

Russian artistic gymnast (born 2004)

Elena Gerasimova Елена Герасимова
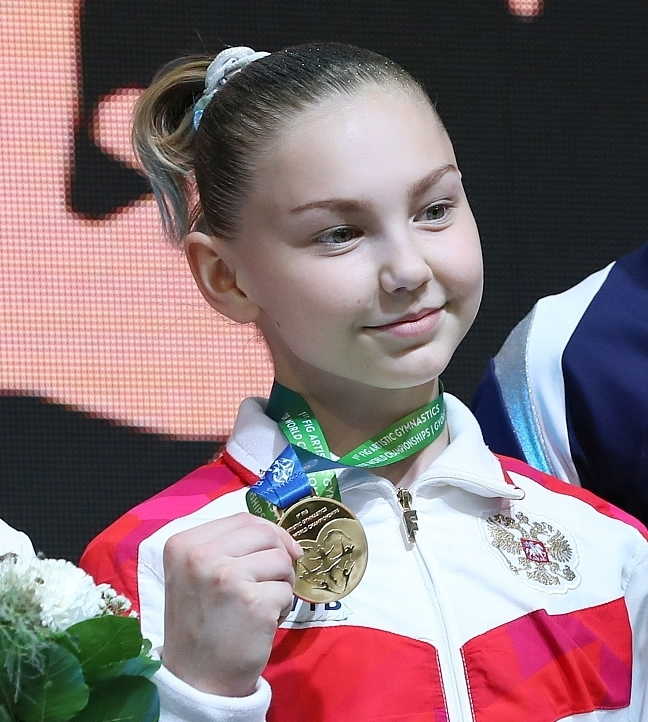
- Gerasimova at the 2019 Junior World Championships

Personal information
- Full name: Elena Anatolyevna Gerasimova
- Born: 21 June 2004 (age 22) Cheboksary, Russia

Gymnastics career
- Discipline: Women's artistic gymnastics
- Country represented: Russia; (2017–2024)
- Club: Cheboksary Sports School of Olympic Reserve No.6
- Head coach: Margarita Ivanova
- Assistant coaches: Vasiliy Ivanov; Svetlana Platonova
Medal record
Women's artistic gymnastics
Representing Russia
Junior World Championships
Gold medal – first place	2019 Győr	Team
Gold medal – first place	2019 Györ	Balance Beam
Bronze medal – third place	2019 Győr	Floor Exercise

Elena Anatolyevna Gerasimova (Russian: Елена Анатольевна Герасимова, born 21 June 2004) is a Russian artistic gymnast who represented Russian Olympic Committee athletes at the 2020 Summer Olympics. She was a member of the team who won gold at the inaugural Junior World Championships. Individually she is the 2019 Junior World Champion on the balance beam.

== Early life ==
Gerasimova was born in Cheboksary, Russia in 2004.

== Junior gymnastics career ==
=== 2017 ===
Gerasimova competed at International Gymnix in Montreal, Canada. She helped the Russian team finish third and individually she placed twelfth in the all-around and fifth on the uneven bars. She competed at the Russian National Championships in April in the KMS division. She placed third in the all-around behind Olga Astafyeva and Irina Komnova. During event finals she placed eighth on the vault, first on balance beam, and third on floor exercise. In December she competed at the 2017 Voronin Cup where she recorded the fourth highest score but did not place due to compatriots Aleksandra Shchekoldina and Vladislava Urazova scoring higher.

=== 2018 ===
In March Gerasimova returned to compete at International Gymnix. She placed fourth in the all-around behind Zoé Allaire-Bourgie of Canada, Asia D'Amato of Italy, and compatriot Viktoria Listunova. During event finals she placed first on uneven bars, eighth on balance beam, and third on floor exercise. The following month she competed at the City of Jesolo Trophy where she helped Russia place second in the team final behind Italy and individually she placed ninth in the all-around. During event finals she placed sixth on balance beam. In July she competed at the Russian National Championships where she placed fourth on uneven bars and tenth in the all-around due to not competing on floor exercise during the finals.

In November Gerasimova competed at Elite Gym Massilia where she placed sixteenth in the all-around but won gold on balance beam. In December she competed at the Vornin Cup and won gold on the balance beam.

=== 2019 ===
Gerasimova competed at the City of Jesolo Trophy where she helped Russia win gold ahead of the United States. In the all-around, she won bronze behind American Konnor McClain and teammate Vladislava Urazova. In event finals she won silver on uneven bars behind Urazova and bronze on balance beam behind teammate Viktoria Listunova and Ciena Alipio of the United States. In May she competed at the Russian National Championships where she won bronze in the all-around behind Urazova and Listunova. She also qualified to three event finals where she won silver on uneven bars behind Urazova, silver on balance beam behind Yulia Nikolayeva, and placed fifth on floor exercise.

In late June Gerasimova competed at the inaugural Junior World Championships alongside Viktoria Listunova and Vladislava Urazova. Together the team won gold, finishing 2.157 points ahead of second place China. Individually she was the fifth highest scoring gymnast but did not place due to both of her teammates scoring higher. She qualified to the balance beam and floor exercise finals. During event finals she placed first on balance beam and won bronze on floor exercise behind Listunova and Ou Yushan of China.

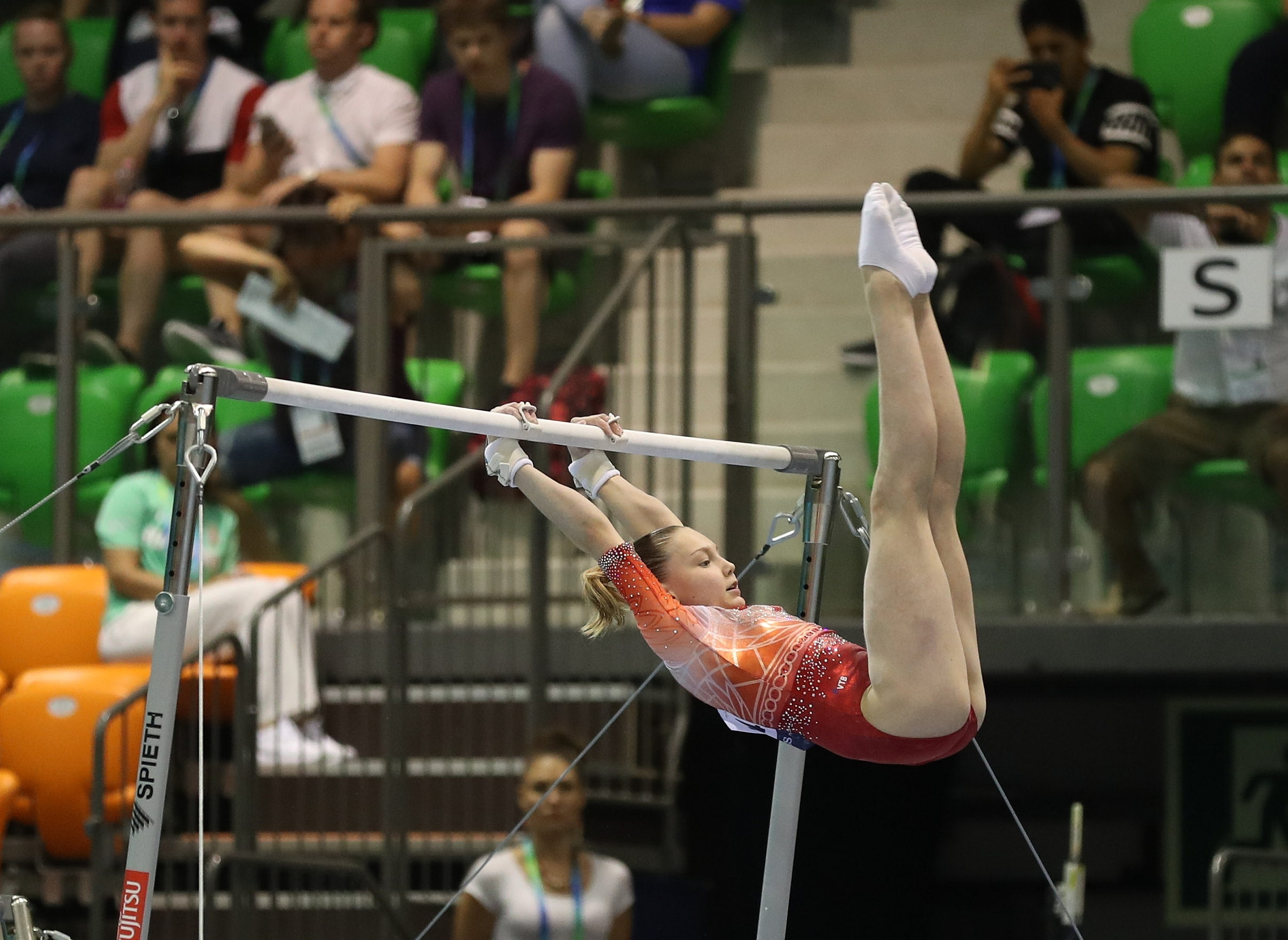
Team / All-Around Final

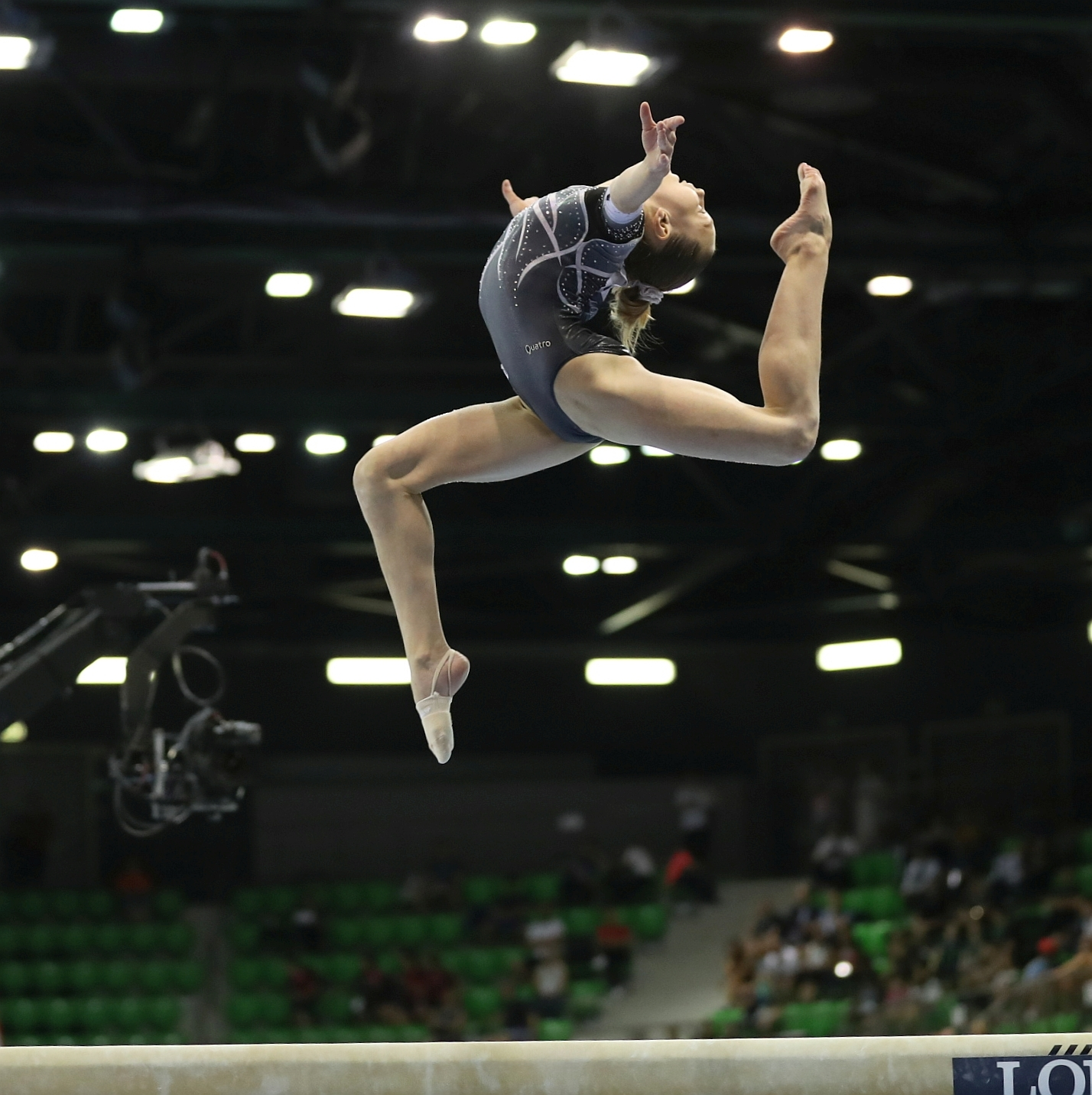
Balance Beam Final

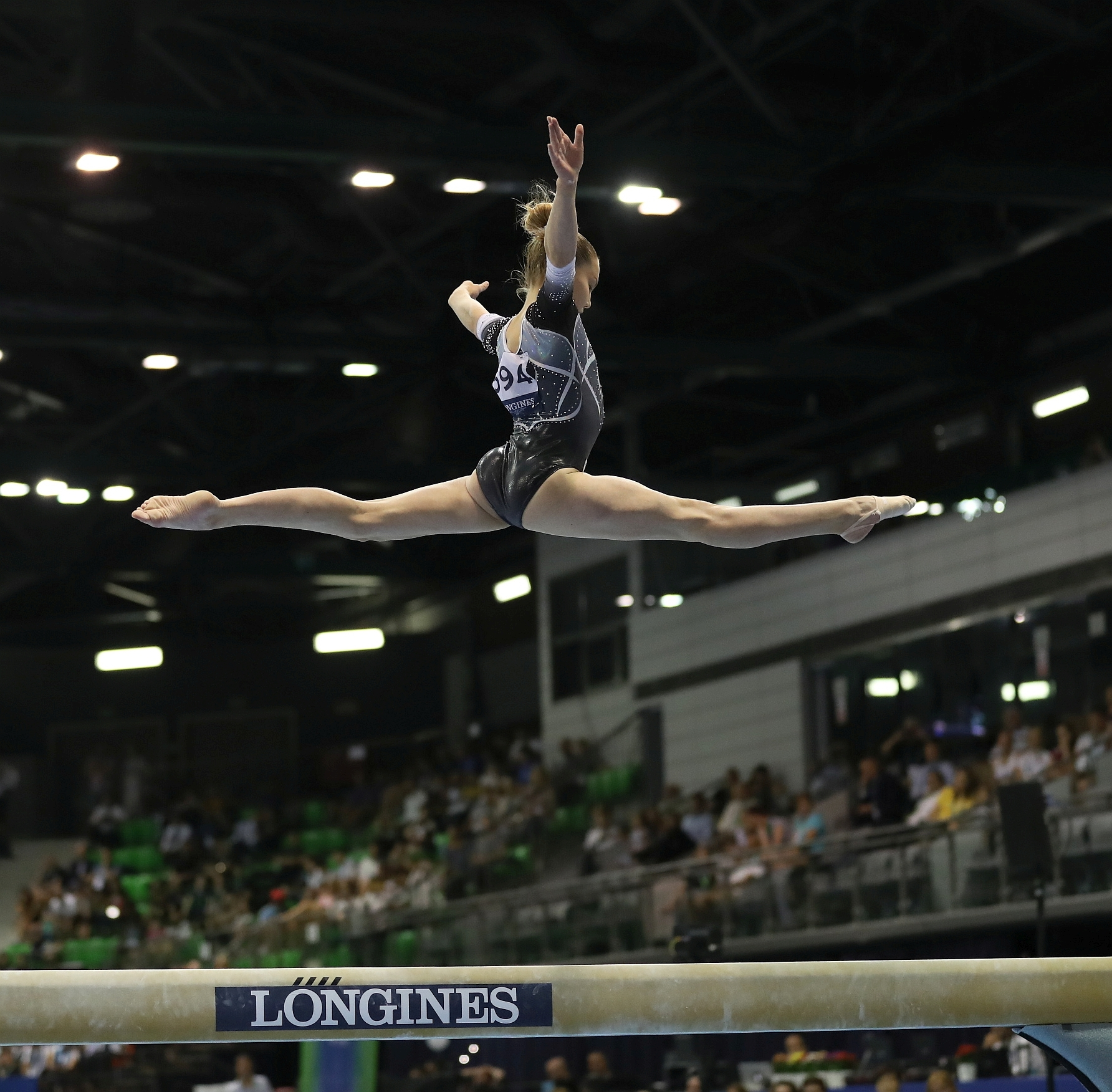
Balance Beam Final

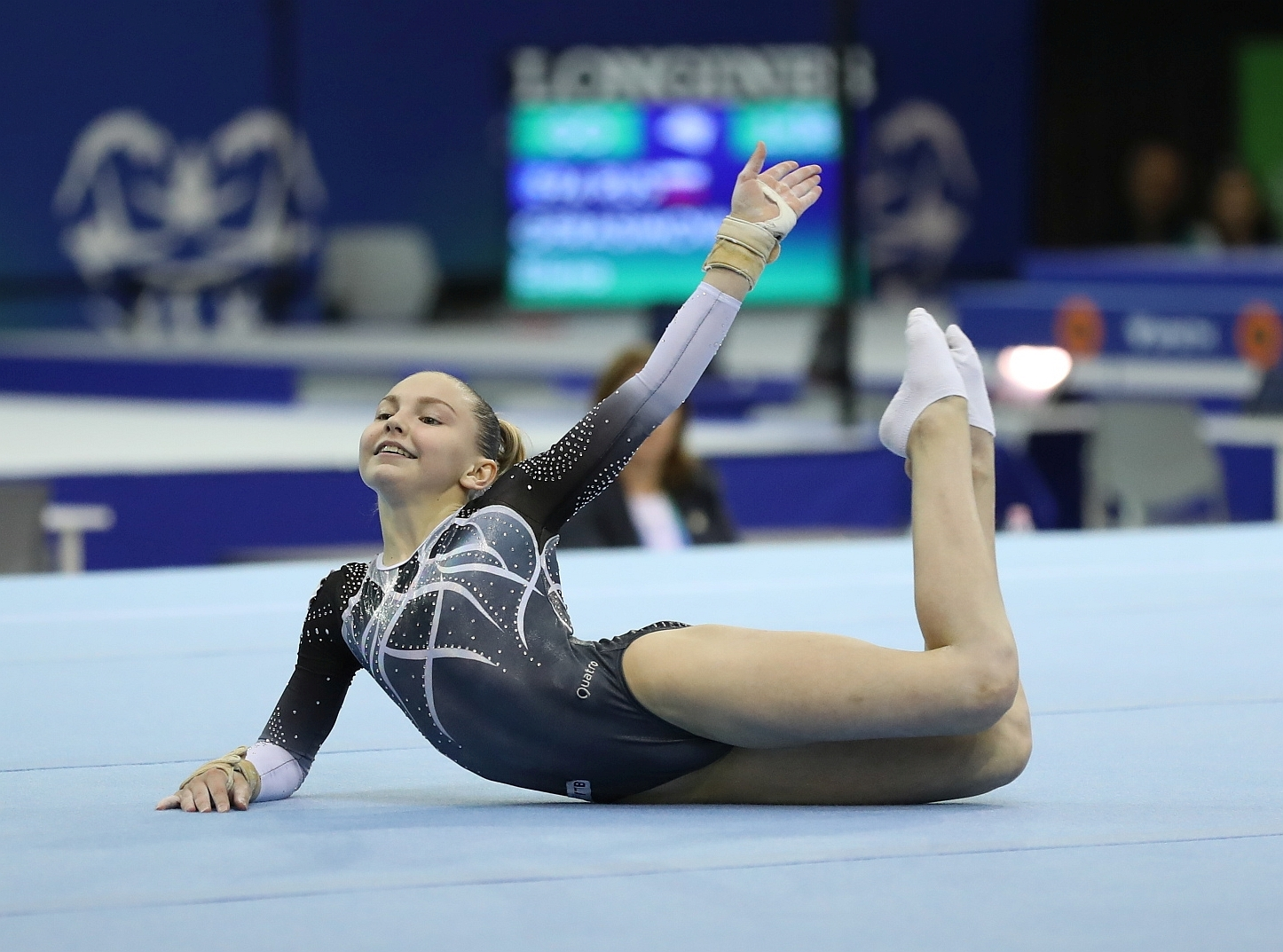
Floor Exercise Final

Gerasimova at the 2019 Junior World Championships

In August Gerasimova competed at the Russian Cup, where, although she was a junior, she competed against senior gymnasts. After two days of competition she finished third in the all-around competition, behind fellow junior Vladislava Urazova and senior competitor Angelina Melnikova. On the second day of event finals Gerasimova won silver on balance beam, behind fellow junior Yana Vorona and won silver on floor exercise behind Urazova.

In late November Gerasimova competed at the Top Gym tournament in Charleroi, Belgium on a team that was composed of compatriot Urazova and Canadians Natasha Lopez and Jenna Sartoretto. She won bronze in the all-around behind Urazova and Ana Bărbosu of Romania but won gold on balance beam and in the team final.

== Senior gymnastics career ==
=== 2020 ===
In late September it was announced that Gerasimova would make her senior debut at a competition in Hiroshima taking place in November alongside Angelina Melnikova, Lilia Akhaimova, and Yana Vorona. She competed at the 2020 Friendship and Solidarity Competition as part of Team Solidarity who won gold.

=== 2021 ===
In March Gerasimova competed at the Russian National Championships. She finished fourth in the all-around behind Viktoria Listunova, Vladislava Urazova, and Angelina Melnikova. She qualified to the balance beam final where she finished in second behind Listunova and the floor exercise final where she finished seventh. Gerasimova was later selected to compete at the European Championships in Basel alongside Melnikova, Listunova, and Urazova. During qualifications Gerasimova placed 26th in the all-around and 11th on uneven bars but did not qualify for any individual event finals.

Gerasimova next competed at the Russian Cup in June. During the all-around final she finished fifth behind Listunova, Urazova, Melnikova, and Lilia Akhaimova. Gerasimova placed second on balance beam behind Varvara Zubova. Gerasimova was selected to represent the Russian Olympic Committee athletes at the 2020 Summer Olympics. However it was undecided whether she would join Melnikova, Listunova, and Urazova on the four-person team or compete as an individual. In July it was decided that Akhaimova would be a part of the team and Gerasimova would compete as an individual alongside Anastasia Ilyankova. At the Olympic Games Gerasimova finished 38th in the all-around and 16th on balance beam during qualification; however she did not advance to any event finals.

=== 2022 ===
Gerasimova started the year with an historic team gold medal for the Volga Region at the national championships. In that competition, she was the gold medalist on balance beam as well. During the Russian Cup she was seriously injured during the all around when was performing DTY for first time in competition. She managed to return in early November in competitive mode.

== Competitive history ==
Competitive history of Elena Gerasimova at the junior level
Year	Event	Team	AA	VT	UB	BB	FX
2017	International Gymnix	3rd place, bronze medalist(s)	12		5		
2017	Russian Championships		3rd place, bronze medalist(s)	8		1st place, gold medalist(s)	3rd place, bronze medalist(s)
2018	International Gymnix		4		1st place, gold medalist(s)	8	3rd place, bronze medalist(s)
2018	City of Jesolo Trophy	2nd place, silver medalist(s)	9			6	
2018	Russian Championships		10		4		
2018	Elite Gym Massilia		16			1st place, gold medalist(s)	
2018	Voronin Cup					1st place, gold medalist(s)	
2019	City of Jesolo Trophy	1st place, gold medalist(s)	3rd place, bronze medalist(s)		2nd place, silver medalist(s)	3rd place, bronze medalist(s)	
2019	Russian Championships		3rd place, bronze medalist(s)		2nd place, silver medalist(s)	2nd place, silver medalist(s)	5
2019	Junior World Championships	1st place, gold medalist(s)				1st place, gold medalist(s)	3rd place, bronze medalist(s)
2019	Russian Cup		3rd place, bronze medalist(s)			2nd place, silver medalist(s)	2nd place, silver medalist(s)
2019	Top Gym	1st place, gold medalist(s)	3rd place, bronze medalist(s)			1st place, gold medalist(s)	

Competitive history of Elena Gerasimova at the senior level
Year	Event	Team	AA	VT	UB	BB	FX
2020	Friendship & Solidarity Meet	1st place, gold medalist(s)					
2021	National Championships	3rd place, bronze medalist(s)	4			2nd place, silver medalist(s)	7
2021	Russian Cup		5		6	2nd place, silver medalist(s)	
2021	Olympic Games		38				
2022	National Championships	1st place, gold medalist(s)	5		5	1st place, gold medalist(s)	
2022	Belarusian Championships					1st place, gold medalist(s)	
2023	National Championships		5		6	2nd place, silver medalist(s)	
2023	Legend Games		1st place, gold medalist(s)			2nd place, silver medalist(s)	1st place, gold medalist(s)
2023	Belarusian Cup	1st place, gold medalist(s)	2nd place, silver medalist(s)			2nd place, silver medalist(s)	
2023	University Games	1st place, gold medalist(s)	1st place, gold medalist(s)		1st place, gold medalist(s)	1st place, gold medalist(s)	1st place, gold medalist(s)
2023	Russian Cup		16			8	
2024	Russian Championships		4		8	2nd place, silver medalist(s)	5
