= List of former Russian women's national gymnastics team rosters =

This is a list of female artistic gymnasts who have been on the Russian national team.

== Current roster (2023) ==
=== Senior ===
Name	Birthdate and age	District represented
Maria Agafonova	3 October 2005 (aged 17)	Northwestern Federal District
Lilia Akhaimova	17 March 1997 (aged 25)	Saint Petersburg
Elena Gerasimova	21 June 2004 (aged 18)	Volga Federal District
Alena Glotova	12 August 2005 (aged 17)	Volga Federal District
Anastasia Ilyankova	12 January 2001 (aged 21)	Siberian Federal District
Diana Kustova	9 August 2007 (aged 15)	Central Federal District
Viktoria Listunova	2 May 2005 (aged 17)	Central Federal District
Angelina Melnikova (captain)	18 July 2000 (aged 22)	Central Federal District
Maria Minaeva	19 April 2005 (aged 17)	Volga Federal District
Uliana Perebinosova	4 May 2001 (aged 21)	Central Federal District
Arina Semukhina	28 October 2005 (aged 17)	Siberian Federal District
Vladislava Urazova	14 August 2004 (aged 18)	Southern Federal District
Leila Vasileva	9 December 2007 (aged 15)	Central Federal District
Yana Vorona	28 December 2004 (aged 18)	Central Federal District

== 2021 ==
=== Senior ===
Name	Birthdate and age	District represented
Anastasia Agafonova	4 August 2003 (aged 18)	Central Federal District
Lilia Akhaimova	17 March 1997 (aged 24)	Saint Petersburg
Daria Belousova	10 December 2003 (aged 18)	Volga Federal District
Elena Gerasimova	21 June 2004 (aged 17)	Volga Federal District
Anastasia Ilyankova	12 January 2001 (aged 20)	Siberian Federal District
Viktoria Listunova	2 May 2005 (aged 16)	Central Federal District
Angelina Melnikova	18 July 2000 (aged 21)	Central Federal District
Maria Minaeva	19 April 2005 (aged 16)	Volga Federal District
Uliana Perebinosova	4 May 2001 (aged 20)	Central Federal District
Alexandra Schekoldina	11 July 2002 (age 23)	Ural Federal District
Arina Semukhina	28 October 2005 (aged 16)	Tyumen
Angelina Simakova	26 August 2002 (aged 19)	Moscow
Vladislava Urazova	14 August 2004 (aged 17)	Southern Federal District
Yana Vorona	28 December 2004 (aged 17)	Central Federal District

=== Senior Reserve ===
Name	Birthdate and age	District represented
Olga Astafeva	6 May 2004 (aged 17)	Central Federal District
Nelli Audi	1 July 2005 (aged 16)	Central Federal District
Alyona Glotova	12 August 2005 (aged 16)	Volga Federal District
Irina Komnova	15 September 2004 (aged 17)	Central Federal District
Aliya Mustafina	30 September 1994 (aged 27)	Moscow
Maria Paseka	19 July 1995 (aged 26)	Moscow

== 2020 ==
=== Senior ===
Name	Birthdate and age	District represented
Anastasia Agafonova	4 August 2003 (aged 17)	Central Federal District
Lilia Akhaimova	17 March 1997 (aged 23)	Saint Petersburg
Elena Eremina	29 July 2001 (aged 19)	Saint Petersburg
Elena Gerasimova	21 June 2004 (aged 16)	Volga Federal District
Anastasia Ilyankova	12 January 2001 (aged 19)	Siberian Federal District
Ksenia Klimenko	1 November 2003 (aged 17)	Ural Federal District
Angelina Melnikova	18 July 2000 (aged 20)	Central Federal District
Aliya Mustafina	30 September 1994 (aged 26)	Moscow
Maria Paseka	19 July 1995 (aged 25)	Moscow
Alexandra Schekoldina	11 July 2002 (aged 18)	Ural Federal District
Angelina Simakova	26 August 2002 (aged 18)	Moscow
Daria Spiridonova	8 July 1998 (aged 22)	Moscow
Vladislava Urazova	14 August 2004 (aged 16)	Southern Federal District
Yana Vorona	28 December 2004 (aged 16)	Central Federal District

=== Senior Reserve ===
Name	Birthdate and age	District represented
Olga Astafeva	6 May 2004 (aged 16)	Central Federal District
Daria Belousova	10 December 2003 (aged 17)	Volga Federal District
Varvara Zubova	29 October 2002 (aged 18)	Central Federal District
Irina Komnova	15 September 2004 (aged 16)	Central Federal District
Uliana Perebinosova	4 May 2001 (aged 19)	Central Federal District
Alina Stepanova	4 May 2003 (aged 17)	Northwestern Federal District
Viktoria Trykina	9 May 2001 (aged 19)	Central Federal District

=== Junior ===
Name	Birthdate and age	District represented
Nelli Audi	1 July 2005 (aged 15)	Central Federal District
Olga Bachurina	19 November 2005 (aged 15)	Ural Federal District
Alyona Glotova	12 August 2005 (aged 15)	Volga Federal District
Polina Ivanova	7 December 2005 (aged 15)	Central Federal District
Sofia Korolyova	19 July 2005 (aged 15)	Central Federal District
Angelina Kosynkina	10 December 2005 (aged 15)	Volga Federal District
Viktoria Listunova	2 May 2005 (aged 15)	Central Federal District
Maria Minaeva	19 April 2005 (aged 15)	Volga Federal District
Yulia Nikolaeva	6 December 2005 (aged 15)	Volga Federal District

== 2019 senior roster ==
Name	Birthdate and age	District represented
Lilia Akhaimova	17 March 1997 (aged 22)	Saint Petersburg
Irina Alexeeva	20 April 2002 (aged 17)	–
Elena Eremina	29 July 2001 (aged 18)	Saint Petersburg
Anastasia Ilyankova	12 January 2001 (aged 18)	Siberian Federal District
Ksenia Kamkova	5 December 2002 (aged 17)	Ural Federal District
Ksenia Klimenko	1 November 2003 (aged 16)	Ural Federal District
Angelina Melnikova	18 July 2000 (aged 19)	Central Federal District
Aliya Mustafina	30 September 1994 (aged 25)	Moscow
Maria Paseka	19 July 1995 (aged 24)	Moscow
Ulyana Perebinosova	4 May 2001 (aged 18)	Moscow
Alexandra Schekoldina	11 July 2002 (aged 17)	Ural Federal District
Angelina Simakova	26 August 2002 (aged 17)	Moscow
Daria Spiridonova	8 July 1998 (aged 21)	Moscow
Viktoria Trykina	9 May 2001 (aged 18)	Moscow

== 2018 senior roster ==
Name	Birthdate and age	District represented
Aliya Mustafina	30 September 1994 (aged 24)	Moscow
Maria Paseka	19 July 1995 (aged 23)	Moscow
Eleonora Afanasyeva	4 September 1996 (aged 22)	Northwestern Federal District
Lilia Akhaimova	17 March 1997 (aged 21)	Saint Petersburg
Daria Spiridonova	8 July 1998 (aged 20)	Moscow
Maria Kharenkova	29 October 1998 (aged 20)	Southern Federal District
Angelina Melnikova	18 July 2000 (aged 18)	Central Federal District
Anastasia Ilyankova	12 January 2001 (aged 17)	Siberian Federal District
Ulyana Perebinosova	4 May 2001 (aged 17)	Moscow
Elena Eremina	29 July 2001 (aged 17)	Saint Petersburg
Irina Alexeeva	20 April 2002 (aged 16)	–
Alexandra Schekoldina	11 July 2002 (aged 16)	Ural Federal District
Angelina Simakova	26 August 2002 (aged 16)	Moscow

== 2017 senior roster ==
Name	Birthdate and age	Represent
Ksenia Afanasyeva	13 September 1991 (aged 26)	Central Federal District
Aliya Mustafina	30 September 1994 (aged 23)	Moscow
Maria Paseka	19 July 1995 (aged 22)	Moscow
Lilia Akhaimova	17 March 1997 (aged 20)	Saint Petersburg
Evgeniya Shelgunova	8 August 1997 (aged 20)	Central Federal District
Daria Spiridonova	8 July 1998 (aged 19)	Moscow
Maria Kharenkova	29 October 1998 (aged 19)	Southern Federal District
Seda Tutkhalyan	15 July 1999 (aged 18)	Moscow
Natalia Kapitonova	31 May 2000 (aged 17)	Volga Federal District
Angelina Melnikova	18 July 2000 (aged 17)	Central Federal District
Daria Skrypnik	4 October 2000 (aged 17)	Southern Federal District
Anastasia Ilyankova	26 May 2001 (aged 16)	Siberian Federal District
Elena Eremina	29 July 2001 (aged 16)	Saint Petersburg

== 2015 senior roster ==
Name	Birthdate and age	Birthplace
Ksenia Afanasyeva	13 September 1991 (aged 24)	Tula
Darya Elizarova	28 January 1991 (aged 24)	Moscow
Polina Fedorova	4 February 1996 (aged 19)	Cheboksary
Maria Kharenkova	29 October 1998 (aged 17)	Rostov-on-Don
Viktoria Komova	30 January 1995 (aged 20)	Voronezh
Ekaterina Kramarenko	22 April 1991 (aged 24)	Saint Petersburg
Aliya Mustafina	30 September 1994 (aged 21)	Yegoryevsk
Tatiana Nabieva	21 November 1994 (aged 21)	Pushkin
Maria Paseka	19 July 1995 (aged 20)	Moscow
Evgeniya Shelgunova	8 August 1997 (aged 18)	Alatyr
Alla Sosnitskaya	10 April 1997 (aged 18)	Moscow
Daria Spiridonova	8 July 1998 (aged 17)	Novocheboksarsk
Seda Tutkhalyan	15 July 1999 (aged 16)	Gyumri, Armenia
