= Yeremeyev =

Yeremeyev (Russian: Ереме́ев; masculine) or Yeremeyeva (Ереме́ева; feminine) is a Russian surname that is derived from the male given name Yeremey and literally means Yeremey's. It may refer to:

- Ihor Yeremeyev (1968–2015), Ukrainian politician
- Oksana Yeremeyeva (born 1990), Russian footballer
- Sergei Yeremeyev (writer) (born 1959), Russian children's writer and poet
- Vitali Yeremeyev (born 1975), Kazakhstani ice hockey goaltender
- Vladimir Yeremeyev (born 1988), Russian football player
