= Varvara Zubova =

Russian artistic gymnast (born 2002)

- Full name: Varvara Andreevna Zubova
- Nicknames: Varya, ZubZub
- Born: 29 October 2002 (age 23) Moscow, Russia

Gymnastics career
- Discipline: Women's artistic gymnastics
- Country represented: Russia; (2014–20 (RUS))
- Head coach: Elena Kuznetsova
Medal record
Artistic gymnastics
Representing Russia
Junior European Championships
Gold medal – first place	2016 Bern	Team
European Youth Olympic Festival
Gold medal – first place	2017 Győr	Team
Bronze medal – third place	2017 Győr	All-Around

Varvara Andreevna Zubova (Russian: Варвара Андреевна Зубова, born 29 October 2002) is a Russian artistic gymnast and a former member of Russia's national gymnastics team. She resides in Moscow, Moscow Region, Russia, and is coached by Elena Kuznetsova.

== Career ==
=== Junior ===
==== 2014 ====
Zubova competed at the 2014 Gym Festival Trnava in Slovakia, winning gold on the balance beam and taking the team bronze medal. She also placed fourth in the all-around.

==== 2015 ====
Zubova competed at the 2015 Junior Russian Championships, in the Candidate Master of Sport division. She won silver with her team, as well as a bronze in the all-around and a gold on the balance beam, and placed 4th on the uneven bars and 5th on floor exercise.

==== 2016 ====
In March, Zubova competed at the International Gymnix in Montreal, Canada, where she was part of the Russian junior team that took the silver medal behind the United States. Individually, she placed 10th in the all-around and second on the balance beam behind Emma Malabuyo. In April, Zubova placed third all-around in the Candidate Master of Sport category at the Russian Championships, behind Ksenia Klimenko and Aleksandra Shchekoldina. She also won the gold on floor. At the 2016 European Championships, Zubova was part of the Russian team (alongside Elena Eremina, Anastasia Ilyankova, Uliana Perebinosova and Angelina Simakova) that won the gold medal in the junior team final ahead of Great Britain and Romania. She did not make any individual finals.

==== 2017 ====
In April, Zubova competed at the City of Jesolo Trophy in Italy, where Russia took the junior team bronze medal behind the United States and Italy. Zubova also placed 15th in the all-around and eighth on the balance beam. Later that month, Zubova won the all-around bronze at the Russian Junior Championships in the Master of Sport category behind Ksenia Klimenko and Anastasia Agafonova. Zubova represented Russia at the 2017 European Youth Olympic Festival in Győr, Hungary, where she took the bronze medal in the all-around behind her teammate Ksenia Klimenko and Italy's Asia D’Amato. She also won the gold with the Russian team.

=== Senior ===
==== 2018 ====
Zubova turned 16 years old in 2018, making her eligible for senior competitions. She made her senior debut at the Russian Championships, placing 13th in the all-around and first with the Moscow team. She competed at the Osijek World Challenge Cup, placing sixth on bars and eighth on beam. At the Russian Cup, Zubova finished seventh in the all-around, seventh on vault, fifth on beam and sixth on floor.

==== 2019 ====
At the 2019 Russian Championships, Zubova placed 17th in the all-around and first with the Moscow team. Later that year, Zubova competed at the Baku World Cup, placing fourth in the floor final behind Jade Carey, Lara Mori and Vanessa Ferrari, and at the Doha World Cup, where she finished 6th on floor. In December, Zubova won the all-around at the Larisa Latynina Cup, and also earned the gold on vault and floor, and the silver on bars and beam.

==== 2020–21 ====
Zubova was not named to the 2020 and 2021 Russian national teams (in 2020 she was a member of the senior reserve team), but she continues to compete in domestic competitions representing Moscow, and she has also appeared in the French Top 12 Series.

== Competitive history ==
Year	Event	Team	AA	VT	UB	BB	FX
Junior
2013	Russian Hopes (1st Class)						1st place, gold medalist(s)
2014	National Championships		3rd place, bronze medalist(s)			5	1st place, gold medalist(s)
2014	Gym Festival Trnava	3rd place, bronze medalist(s)	4				
2014	Russian Hopes (1st Class)	1st place, gold medalist(s)	5		6	2nd place, silver medalist(s)	3rd place, bronze medalist(s)
2015	National Championships	2nd place, silver medalist(s)	3rd place, bronze medalist(s)		4	1st place, gold medalist(s)	5
2016	L'International Gymnix	2nd place, silver medalist(s)	10			2nd place, silver medalist(s)	
2016	National Championships		3rd place, bronze medalist(s)		6	4	1st place, gold medalist(s)
2016	European Championships	1st place, gold medalist(s)					
2016	Voronin Cup (Junior)					1st place, gold medalist(s)	
2017	City of Jesolo Trophy	3rd place, bronze medalist(s)	15			8	
2017	Russian Junior Championships		3rd place, bronze medalist(s)	6	5		2nd place, silver medalist(s)
2017	European Youth Olympic Festival	1st place, gold medalist(s)	3rd place, bronze medalist(s)		4		8
2017	Tournoi International	2nd place, silver medalist(s)	2nd place, silver medalist(s)	4		1st place, gold medalist(s)	4
2017	Voronin Cup					1st place, gold medalist(s)	
Senior
2018	Russian Championships	1st place, gold medalist(s)	13				
2018	Osijek World Challenge Cup				6	8	
2018	Russian Cup		7	7		5	6
2018	Voronin Cup		6		4	4	
2019	Russian Championships	1st place, gold medalist(s)	17	8			
2019	Baku World Cup						4
2019	Doha World Cup						6
2019	Russian Cup		11			7	
2019	Larisa Latynina Cup		1st place, gold medalist(s)	1st place, gold medalist(s)	2nd place, silver medalist(s)	2nd place, silver medalist(s)	1st place, gold medalist(s)
2021	Russian Championships	1st place, gold medalist(s)	11				
2021	Russian Cup		11			1st place, gold medalist(s)	9
