= 2015 Russian Artistic Gymnastics Championships =

Gymnastics competition in Russia

Russian Artistic Gymnastics Championships
- Location: Penza, Russia
- Date: March 5–8, 2015

The 2015 Russian Artistic Gymnastics Championships were held in Penza, Russia from March 5–8 for senior and April 1–4 for junior.

== Medal winners ==
Event	Gold	Silver	Bronze
Senior
Team	Central Federal District - 1 Maria Kharenkova; Evgeniya Shelgunova; Ksenia Afanasyeva; Viktoria Komova; Daria Elizarova; Maria Bondareva	Moscow; Daria Spiridonova; Seda Tutkhalyan; Alla Sosnitskaya; Maria Paseka; Alexandra Yazydzhyan	Volga Federal District; Anastasia Dmitrieva; Polina Fedorova; Olga Bikmurzina; Maria Silyukova; Olga Valekzhanina
All-Around	Maria Kharenkova	Alla Sosnitskaya	Seda Tutkhalyan
Vault	Alla Sosnitskaya	Maria Paseka	Seda Tutkhalyan
Uneven Bars	Daria Spiridonova	Ekaterina Kramarenko	Maria Paseka
Balance Beam	Maria Kharenkova	Daria Spiridonova	Seda Tutkhalyan
Floor Exercise	Ksenia Afanasyeva	Evgeniya Shelgunova	Maria Kharenkova
Junior
Team	Central Federal District - 1 Ekaterina Sokova; Angelina Melnikova; Angelina Simakova; Viktoria Gorbatova; Ekaterina Tyunina; Taisia Borozdyko	Moscow - 1 Varvara Zubova; Elizaveta Kochetkova; Viktoria Gazeeva; Elena Guseva; Elnara Ablyazova; Anastasia Kuznetsova	Volga Federal District - 1 Natalia Kapitonova; Ulyana Perebinosova; Anastasia Gainetdinova; Elena Bobyleva; Viktoria Panchuk; Anastasia Kornilova
All-Around	MS:Daria Skrypnik; CMS:Angelina Simakova	MS:Angelina Melnikova; CMS:Valeria Saifulina	MS:Ekaterina Sokova; CMS:Varvara Zubova
Vault	MS:Elena Eremina; CMS:Angelina Simakova	MS:Elizaveta Kochetkova; CMS:Valeria Saifulina	MS:Inga Galeeva; CMS:Viktoria Gorbatova
Uneven Bars	MS:Daria Skrypnik; CMS:Ulyana Perebinosova	MS:Natalia Kapitonova; CMS:Angelina Simakova	MS:Elena Eremina; CMS:Polina Borzykh
Balance Beam	MS:Angelina Melnikova; CMS:Varvara Zubova	MS:Elena Eremina; CMS:Angelina Simakova	MS:Ekaterina Sokova; CMS:Polina Borzykh; Viktoria Gorbatova
Floor Exercise	MS:Ekaterina Sokova; CMS:Viktoria Gorbatova; Angelina Simakova	MS:Angelina Melnikova	MS:Daria Skrypnik; CMS:Valeria Saifulina
Youth
Team	Central Federal District - 1 Olga Astafyeva; Anastasia Agafonova; Ksenia Cheban; Maria Beletskaya; Polina Vavilova	Moscow; Sofia Korolyova; Viktoria Listunova; Nelli Audi; Elizaveta Sokolova; Elizoveta Serova	Ural Federal District; Maria Bruenok; Ksenia Klimenko; Arina Strukova; Ekaterina Dmitrienko; Anastasia Guskova
All-Around	1st Level:Olga Astafyeva; 2nd Level:Nelli Audi	1st Level:Ksenia Klimenko; 2nd Level:Ksenia Cheban	1st Level:Anastasia Agafonova; 2nd Level:Viktoria Listunova
Vault	1st Level:Anastasia Agafonova; 2nd Level:Viktoria Listunova	1st Level:Alina Stepanova; 2nd Level:Nelli Audi	1st Level:Alina Lifintseva; 2nd Level:Maria Minaeva
Uneven Bars	1st Level:Ksenia Klimenko; 2nd Level:Polina Vavilova	1st Level:Olga Astafyeva; 2nd Level:Ksenia Cheban	1st Level:Anastasia Agafonova; 2nd Level:Nelli Audi
Balance Beam	1st Level:Anastasia Agafonova; 2nd Level:Sofia Korolyova	1st Level:Elena Gerasimova; 2nd Level:Sofia Sokolova	1st Level:Yana Vorona; 2nd Level:Ksenia Cheban
Floor Exercise	1st Level:Anastasia Agafonova; 2nd Level:Nelli Audi	1st Level:Arina Strukova; 2nd Level:Varvara Fimina	1st Level:Olga Astafyeva; 2nd Level:Valeria Krapivina

== Results ==
=== Senior Team Final ===
Rank	Team	Vault (gymnastics)	Uneven bars	Balance beam	Floor (gymnastics)	Total
1st place, gold medalist(s)	Central Federal District	43.334	40.433	43.700	43.201	170.668
1st place, gold medalist(s)	Maria Kharenkova	14.167	14.333	15.200	14.167	170.668
1st place, gold medalist(s)	Evgeniya Shelgunova	14.267	12.467	13.500	14.167	170.668
1st place, gold medalist(s)	Ksenia Afanasyeva	14.900			14.867	170.668
1st place, gold medalist(s)	Viktoria Komova		14.000	14.233		170.668
1st place, gold medalist(s)	Daria Elizarova			14.267		170.668
1st place, gold medalist(s)	Maria Bondareva		12.100			170.668
2nd place, silver medalist(s)	Moscow	44.933	43.433	40.300	41.533	170.199
2nd place, silver medalist(s)	Daria Spiridonova		15.533	13.067	13.533	170.199
2nd place, silver medalist(s)	Seda Tutkhalyan	14.733		13.000	13.600	170.199
2nd place, silver medalist(s)	Alla Sosnitskaya	15.033			14.400	170.199
2nd place, silver medalist(s)	Maria Paseka	15.167	13.900			170.199
2nd place, silver medalist(s)	Viktoria Komova *		14.000	14.233		170.199
2nd place, silver medalist(s)	Alexandra Yazydzhyan					170.199
3rd place, bronze medalist(s)	Volga Federal District	41.200	36.967	42.267	41.367	161.801
3rd place, bronze medalist(s)	Anastasia Dmitrieva	13.933	13.700	14.667	13.300	161.801
3rd place, bronze medalist(s)	Evgeniya Shelgunova *	14.267	12.467	13.500	14.167	161.801
3rd place, bronze medalist(s)	Polina Fedorova			14.100	13.900	161.801
3rd place, bronze medalist(s)	Olga Bikmurzina	13.000	10.800			161.801
3rd place, bronze medalist(s)	Maria Silyukova					161.801
3rd place, bronze medalist(s)	Olga Valekzhanina					161.801
4	Saint Petersburg	41.866	38.333	38.267	41.100	159.566
4	Ekaterina Kramarenko	13.700	13.200	13.867	14.000	159.566
4	Lilia Akhaimova	13.833		12.433	13.300	159.566
4	Tatiana Nabieva	14.333	12.800			159.566
4	Anastasia Cheong			11.967	13.800	159.566
4	Alla Sidorenko		12.333			159.566
4	Ekaterina Boeva					159.566
5	Southern Federal District	41.534	35.966	40.467	39.401	157.368
5	Maria Kharenkova *	14.167	14.333	15.200	14.167	157.368
5	Ksenia Molozhavenko	13.500	11.400	13.867	12.967	157.368
5	Elena Shcherbakova		10.233	11.400		157.368
5	Evgenia Menovschikova	13.867				157.368
5	Ekaterina Ishchenko				12.267	157.368
5	Anastasia Osetrova					157.368
6	Siberian Federal District	40.766	34.734	38.500	38.466	152.466
6	Yulia Biryulya	14.000	13.767	13.767	13.333	152.466
6	Polina Spirina	13.333		12.700	12.333	152.466
6	Ekaterina Shtronda		10.367	12.333	12.800	152.466
6	Marina Shashmurina	13.433				152.466
6	Anastasia Kobelkova		10.600			152.466
6	Alyona Nedova					152.466
7	Central Federal District - 2	40.733	32.100	36.533	35.800	145.166
7	Kristina Kiseler	13.533	9.767	10.767	11.467	145.166
7	Kristina Kruglikova	12.933	11.233	13.133		145.166
7	Olesya Lebedeva	13.267			12.333	145.166
7	Margarita Varnakova		11.100	12.633		145.166
7	Alina Bunina				12.000	145.166
7	Anastasia Bolshova					145.166
8	Northwestern Federal District	40.367	27.500	36.400	37.667	141.934
8	Kristina Goryunova	13.333	11.500	13.133	13.267	141.934
8	Anna Vanyushkina	13.767		11.067	12.600	141.934
8	Alina Fedotova			12.200	11.800	141.934
8	Maria Iontef	13.267	10.033			141.934
8	Daria Savatkina		5.967			141.934

=== Senior All-Around ===
Senior Team members Aliya Mustafina, Anastasia Grishina and Anna Rodionova didn't attend. Senior Reserve members Daria Mikhailova didn't attend.

Rank	Gymnast	Team	Vault (gymnastics)	Uneven bars	Balance beam	Floor (gymnastics)	Total
1st place, gold medalist(s)	Maria Kharenkova	Southern / Central	14.100	14.433	15.367	14.133	58.033
2nd place, silver medalist(s)	Alla Sosnitskaya	Moscow	15.333	13.367	14.333	13.567	56.600
3rd place, bronze medalist(s)	Seda Tutkhalyan	Moscow	15.067	13.433	14.267	13.567	56.334
4	Daria Spiridonova	Moscow	13.867	15.367	13.400	13.233	55.867
5	Evgeniya Shelgunova	Central / Volga	14.367	14.000	13.333	14.133	55.833
6	Ekaterina Kramarenko	St Petersburg	14.100	13.867	13.067	14.167	55.201
7	Anastasia Dmitrieva	Volga	14.400	13.167	13.333	14.200	55.100
8	Maria Bondareva	Central	13.933	14.500	12.867	13.700	55.000
9	Daria Elizarova	Central	14.233	13.033	13.800	13.300	54.066
10	Yulia Biryulya	Siberia	14.133	12.800	12.967	13.167	53.067
11	Polina Fedorova	Volga	13.533	13.067	14.067	12.333	53.000
12	Kristina Goryunova	Northwestern	13.633	12.467	14.033	12.700	52.833
13	Alla Sidorenko	St Petersburg	13.500	13.267	13.167	12.767	52.701
14	Anastasia Cheong	St Petersburg	13.900	11.933	13.033	13.433	52.299
15	Lilia Akhaimova	St Petersburg	13.700	11.833	13.167	12.733	51.433
16	Olga Bikmurzina	Volga	13.667	13.100	12.267	12.133	51.167
45	Maria Paseka	Moscow	15.467	14.933		14.200	44.600
54	Tatiana Nabieva	St Petersburg	13.033	13.067	10.733		36.833
55	Viktoria Komova	Moscow / Central		14.700	15.000		29.700
56	Ksenia Afanasyeva	Central	14.933			14.700	29.633

=== Senior Vault ===
Rank	Gymnast	Team	#	A-score	B-score	Penalty	Average	Total
Gold medal	Alla Sosnitskaya	Moscow	1	6.4	8.733	0.3	14.833	14.800
Gold medal	Alla Sosnitskaya	Moscow	2	5.8	8.967	–	14.767	14.800
Silver medal	Maria Paseka	Moscow	1	6.4	7.667	0.1	13.967	14.367
Silver medal	Maria Paseka	Moscow	2	5.8	8.967	—	14.767	14.367
Bronze medal	Seda Tutkhalyan	Moscow	1	5.8	8.767	—	14.567	13.867
Bronze medal	Seda Tutkhalyan	Moscow	2	5.0	8.167	—	13.167	13.867
4	Ksenia Afanasyeva	Central	1	5.8	8.533	0.1	14.233	13.700
4	Ksenia Afanasyeva	Central	2	5.6	7.667	0.1	13.167	13.700
5	Kristina Goryunova	Northwestern	1	5.0	8.667	0.1	13.567	13.550
5	Kristina Goryunova	Northwestern	2	4.8	8.733	—	13.533	13.550
6	Anastasia Dmitrieva	Volga	1	5.2	8.700	—	13.900	13.234
6	Anastasia Dmitrieva	Volga	2	5.3	7.567	0.3	12.567	13.234
7	Anna Vanyushkina	Northwestern	1	5.0	7.733	–	12.733	13.033
7	Anna Vanyushkina	Northwestern	2	4.6	8.833	0.1	13.333	13.033
8	Yulia Biryulya	Siberia	1	5.0	8.567	—	13.567	12.000
8	Yulia Biryulya	Siberia	2	2.4	8.033	–	10.433	12.000

=== Senior Uneven Bars ===
Rank	Gymnast	Team	Difficulty	Execution	Penalty	Total
Gold medal	Daria Spiridonova	Moscow	6.7	8.333	—	15.033
Silver medal	Ekaterina Kramarenko	St Petersburg	6.0	8.600	—	14.600
Bronze medal	Maria Paseka	Moscow	5.9	8.667	—	14.567
4	Maria Kharenkova	Southern / Central	6.0	8.533	—	14.533
5	Viktoria Komova	Moscow / Central	6.1	7.500	—	13.600
6	Seda Tutkhalyan	Moscow	5.8	7.700	—	13.500
7	Evgeniya Shelgunova	Central / Volga	5.9	7.467	—	13.367
8	Maria Bondareva	Central	5.8	6.600	—	12.400

=== Senior Balance Beam ===
Rank	Gymnast	Team	Difficulty	Execution	Penalty	Total
Gold medal	Maria Kharenkova	Southern / Central	6.6	8.033	0.1	14.533
Silver medal	Daria Spiridonova	Moscow	5.9	8.333	—	14.233
Bronze medal	Seda Tutkhalyan	Moscow	6.6	7.600	—	14.200
4	Kristina Goryunova	Northwestern	5.6	8.433	—	14.033
5	Viktoria Komova	Moscow / Central	5.9	7.733	—	13.633
6	Polina Fedorova	Volga	5.7	7.867	0.1	13.467
7	Daria Elizarova	Central	5.7	7.400	0.1	13.000
8	Alla Sosnitskaya	Moscow	5.1	7.200	—	12.300

=== Senior Floor Exercise ===
Rank	Gymnast	Team	Difficulty	Execution	Penalty	Total
Gold medal	Ksenia Afanasyeva	Central	6.4	8.733	—	15.133
Silver medal	Evgeniya Shelgunova	Central / Volga	5.9	8.133	—	14.033
Bronze medal	Maria Kharenkova	Southern / Central	6.0	8.267	0.3	13.967
4	Anastasia Dmitrieva	Volga	5.4	8.700	0.3	13.800
5	Anastasia Cheong	St Petersburg	5.4	8.000	—	13.400
6	Seda Tutkhalyan	Moscow	5.5	7.733	0.1	13.133
7	Alla Sosnitskaya	Moscow	5.7	7.567	0.4	12.867
8	Maria Bondareva	Central	4.5	8.200	0.3	12.400

=== Junior Team Final ===
Rank	Team	Vault (gymnastics)	Uneven bars	Balance beam	Floor (gymnastics)	Total
1st place, gold medalist(s)	Central Federal District	70.601	66.333	69.966	68.367	275.267
1st place, gold medalist(s)	Ekaterina Sokova	13.867	14.100	15.000	14.333	275.267
1st place, gold medalist(s)	Angelina Melnikova	14.467	15.600	13.300	13.167	275.267
1st place, gold medalist(s)	Angelina Simakova	14.300	13.633	14.400	13.967	275.267
1st place, gold medalist(s)	Viktoria Gorbatova	13.967	10.767	13.833	14.167	275.267
1st place, gold medalist(s)	Ekaterina Tyunina	13.000	11.767	13.433	12.567	275.267
1st place, gold medalist(s)	Taisia Borozdyko	14.000	11.233	12.433	12.733	275.267
2nd place, silver medalist(s)	Moscow	68.233	65.567	65.733	67.167	266.700
2nd place, silver medalist(s)	Varvara Zubova	13.233	13.067	14.000	14.100	266.700
2nd place, silver medalist(s)	Elizaveta Kochetkova	14.000	13.567	13.167	13.600	266.700
2nd place, silver medalist(s)	Viktoria Gazeeva	13.567	13.367	13.133	13.167	266.700
2nd place, silver medalist(s)	Elena Guseva	13.833	13.433	11.833	12.767	266.700
2nd place, silver medalist(s)	Elnara Ablyazova	13.600	10.867	13.133	13.200	266.700
2nd place, silver medalist(s)	Anastasia Kuznetsova	13.133	12.133	12.300	13.100	266.700
3rd place, bronze medalist(s)	Volga Federal District	68.267	66.300	64.300	65.267	264.134
3rd place, bronze medalist(s)	Natalia Kapitonova	14.067	14.933	13.400	13.700	264.134
3rd place, bronze medalist(s)	Ulyana Perebinosova	14.300	14.500	12.033	13.600	264.134
3rd place, bronze medalist(s)	Anastasia Gainetdinova	13.233	11.867	13.300	13.000	264.134
3rd place, bronze medalist(s)	Elena Bobyleva	13.567	13.067	12.067	12.200	264.134
3rd place, bronze medalist(s)	Viktoria Panchuk	13.100	11.933	13.033	12.767	264.134
3rd place, bronze medalist(s)	Anastasia Kornilova	12.633	10.133	12.500	12.000	264.134
4	Saint Petersburg	67.266	64.234	63.833	66.199	261.532
4	Elena Eremina	14.433	14.500	13.133	14.433	261.532
4	Valeria Saifullina	14.233	13.967	13.233	13.867	261.532
4	Alexandra Sadkova	12.367	12.200	13.200	12.433	261.532
4	Diana Dogmarova	12.600	11.467	12.100	13.133	261.532
4	Alexandra Kalkutina	13.133	12.100	11.733	12.333	261.532
4	Diana Goloshumova	12.867	9.733	12.167	12.033	261.532

=== Junior All-Around (MS) ===
Rank	Gymnast	Team	Vault (gymnastics)	Uneven bars	Balance beam	Floor (gymnastics)	Total
1st place, gold medalist(s)	Daria Skrypnik	Southern Federal District	14.667	15.433	14.133	14.100	58.333
2nd place, silver medalist(s)	Angelina Melnikova	Central Federal District	15.133	13.733	14.533	13.933	57.332
3rd place, bronze medalist(s)	Ekaterina Sokova	Central Federal District	13.967	14.500	14.100	14.567	57.134
4	Elena Eremina	Saint Petersburg	14.533	13.867	13.233	14.400	57.033
5	Natalia Kapitonova	Volga Federal District	14.200	15.000	13.100	13.600	55.900
6	Elizaveta Kochetkova	Moscow	13.900	13.867	13.100	13.933	54.800
7	Elena Guseva	Moscow	13.333	13.667	13.533	13.100	53.633
8	Anastasia Kuznetsova	Moscow	13.267	12.767	13.333	13.367	52.734

=== Junior All-Around (CMS) ===
Rank	Gymnast	Team	Vault (gymnastics)	Uneven bars	Balance beam	Floor (gymnastics)	Total
1st place, gold medalist(s)	Angelina Simakova	Central Federal District	14.367	13.567	14.267	14.100	56.301
2nd place, silver medalist(s)	Valeria Saifullina	Saint Petersburg	14.200	13.400	13.733	14.367	55.700
3rd place, bronze medalist(s)	Varvara Zubova	Moscow	13.300	13.067	14.167	14.500	55.034
4	Viktoria Gorbatova	Central Federal District	14.033	12.667	14.333	13.733	54.766
5	Polina Borzykh	Ural Federal District	13.633	13.400	13.200	14.100	54.333
6	Ulyana Perebinosova	Volga Federal District	14.100	14.267	12.500	13.300	54.167
7	Taisia Borozdyko	Central Federal District	13.800	11.433	13.433	13.733	52.399
8	Anna Subbotina	Central Federal District	13.500	11.533	13.567	13.733	52.333

== European Championships selections ==
The team to the 2015 European Artistic Gymnastics Championships was announced on 10 March 2015.

	Senior
1	Maria Kharenkova
2	Ksenia Afanasyeva
3	Daria Spiridonova
4	~~Alla Sosnitskaya~~ (injured)
5	Maria Paseka
