= Lilia Akhaimova =

Russian artistic gymnast

Liliya Akhaimova Лилия Ахаимова
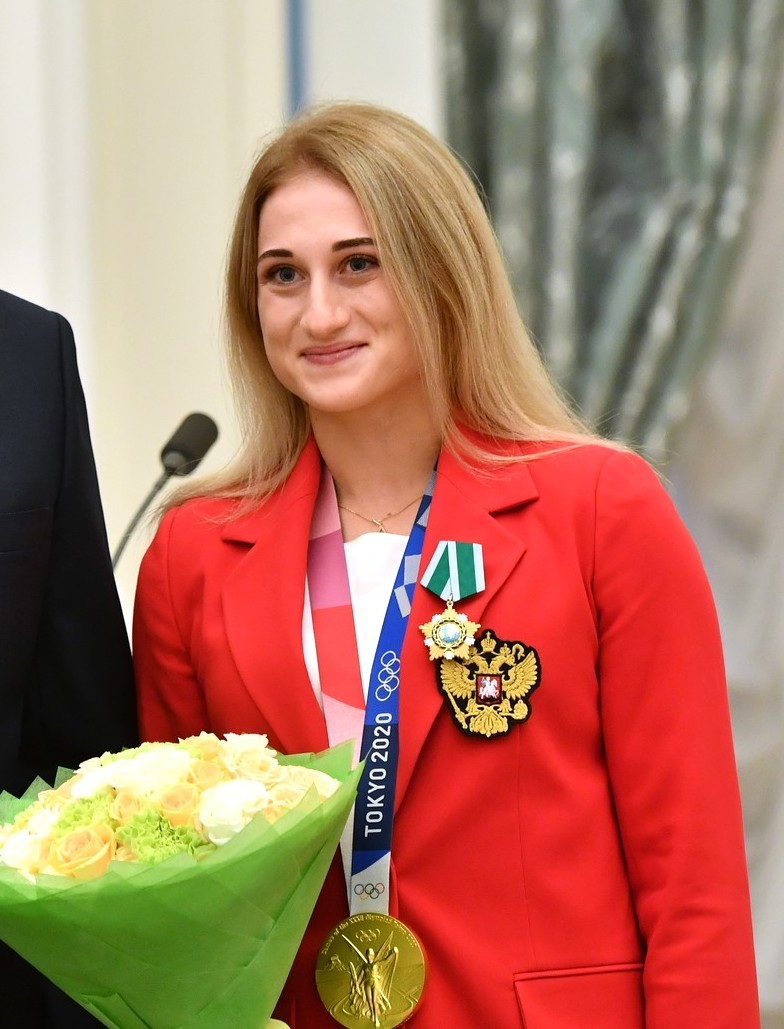
- Akhaimova in 2021

Personal information
- Full name: Lilia Igorevna Akhaimova
- Alternative name: Liliia Akhaimova
- Born: 17 March 1997 (age 29) Vladivostok, Russia
- Height: 1.56 m (5 ft 1 in)

Gymnastics career
- Discipline: Women's artistic gymnastics
- Country represented: Russia (2016–2022)
- Club: Pushkin District Sports School of Olympic Reserve
- Head coach: Vera Kiryashova
- Retired: 17 June 2022
Medal record
Women's artistic gymnastics
Representing (Russia) ROC
Olympic Games
Gold medal – first place	2020 Tokyo	Team
Representing Russia
World Championships
Silver medal – second place	2018 Doha	Team
Silver medal – second place	2019 Stuttgart	Team
European Championships
Gold medal – first place	2018 Glasgow	Team
Summer Universiade
Gold medal – first place	2017 Taipei	Team
Silver medal – second place	2017 Taipei	Vault
Silver medal – second place	2019 Napoli	Team
Silver medal – second place	2019 Napoli	Vault
Bronze medal – third place	2017 Taipei	Floor exercise
Bronze medal – third place	2019 Napoli	All-around
FIG World Cup
Event	1st	2nd	3rd
Apparatus World Cup	1	1	0
World Challenge Cup	0	0	1
Total	1	1	1

Lilia Igorevna Akhaimova (Russian: Лилия Игоревна Ахаимова, IPA: [ˈlʲilʲɪɪ̯ə ɐxɐˈiməvə], born 17 March 1997) is a Russian retired artistic gymnast. She represented the Russian Olympic Committee at the 2020 Summer Olympics and won a gold medal in the team event. She is a two-time World silver medalist (2018, 2019) and the 2018 European champion with the Russian team. She is also a six-time Universiade medalist.

== Personal life ==
Akhaimova was born on 17 March 1997 in Vladivostok, Russian Far East, but she has resided with her parents in Saint Petersburg since August 2012. When she was five, her parents enrolled her in rhythmic gymnastics, but her coach encouraged her to switch to artistic gymnastics. Akhaimova's younger sister, Lyubov also competed at the national level in artistic gymnastics. She is of Jewish background. She studied sport and health at the Lesgaft National State University of Physical Education in St. Petersburg.

== Career ==
=== 2013–14 ===
Akhaimova finished fourteenth in the all-around at the 2013 Russian Championships. Then at the Russian Cup, she finished tenth all-around, fourth on vault, and seventh on floor exercise. She won a team gold medal at the Gymnasiade as the alternate.

Akhaimova finished ninth in the all-around at the 2014 Russian Championships, and she placed fourth in both the vault and floor exercise event finals. Then at the Russian Cup, she finished tenth all-around, fourth on vault, and seventh on floor exercise. She then competed at her first international competition- the Élite Gym Massilia. She finished twentieth in the all-around and won a silver medal with the Russian team. Then at the Tournoi Pas-de-Calais, she won the team silver medal with Elena Eremina, and Akhaimova won the all-around bronze medal and the vault gold medal.

=== 2015–16 ===
At the 2015 Russian Championships, Akhaimova placed fifteenth in the all-around, and at the Russian Cup she finished seventh.

Akhaimova finished twelfth in the all-around at the 2016 Russian Championships. Then at the Russian Cup, she won the gold medal on the floor exercise. She was a non-traveling alternate for Russia's 2016 Olympic team. After the Olympics, she competed at the Toyota International where she finished fourth on the uneven bars and seventh on the balance beam. Then at the Voronin Cup, she won the gold medal with teammate Elena Eremina. Individually, she won the gold medals on the vault and floor exercise.

=== 2017 ===
Akhaimova began the season at the Russian Championships where she became the national floor exercise champion and was runner-up on vault. She then competed at the DTB Pokal Team Challenge alongside Elena Eremina, Natalia Kapitonova, Evgenia Shelgunova, and Daria Spiridonova, and they won the team gold. She then won a bronze medal on the floor exercise at the Osijek World Challenge Cup behind Brazilians Thaís Fidélis and Flávia Saraiva. She was selected to represent Russia at the 2017 Summer Universiade alongside Shelgunova, Spiridonova, Darya Elizarova, and Maria Paseka, and they won gold in the team competition. Then in the vault final, she won the silver medal behind Canada's Brittany Rogers, and she won the bronze medal in the floor exercise final. At the Cottbus World Cup, she won a silver medal on vault and a gold medal on floor exercise.

=== 2018 ===
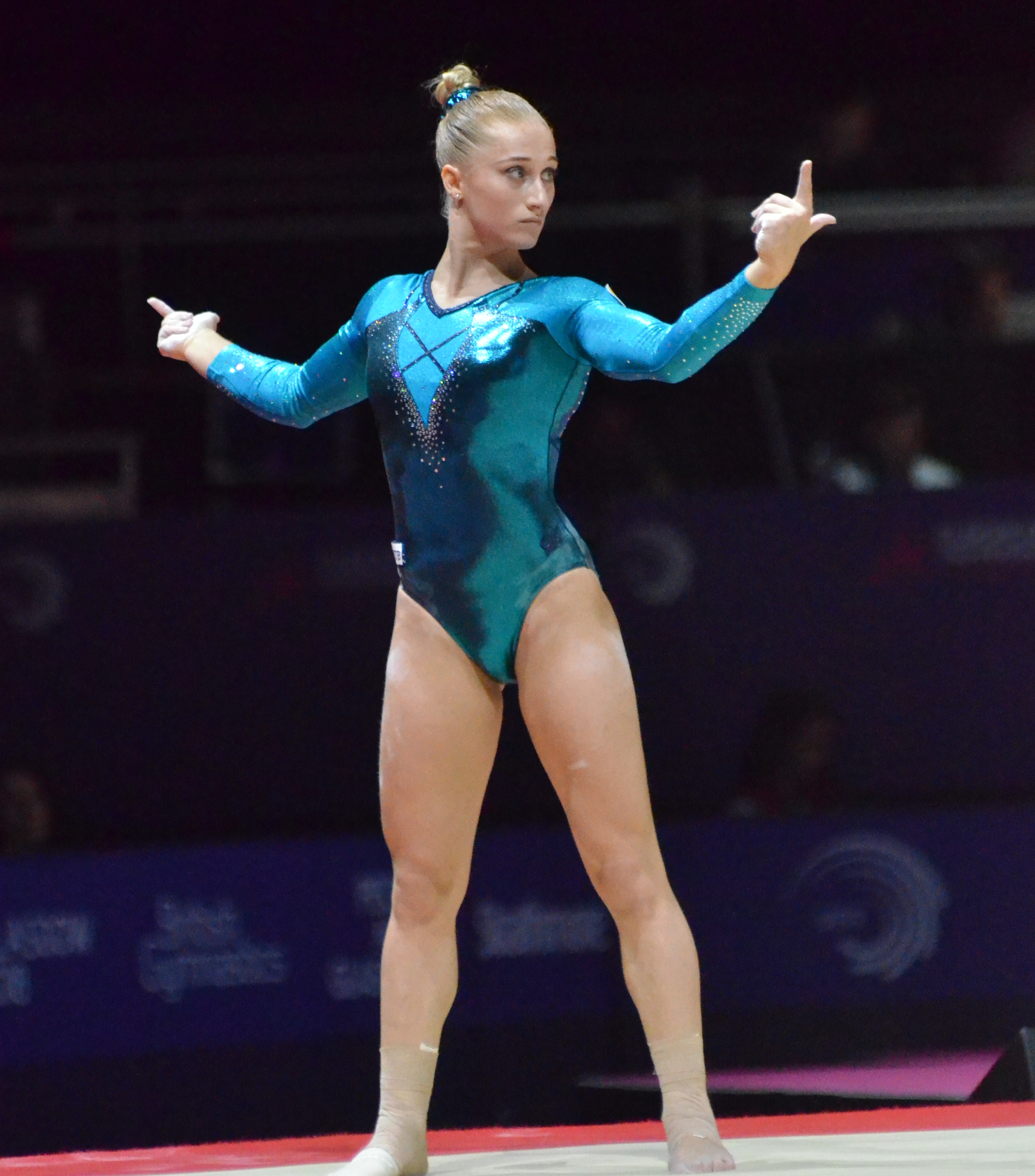
Akhaimova at the 2018 European Championships

In March, Akhaimova tore a ligament in her ankle in three places. In July, she won the silver medal on the floor exercise at the Russian Cup. She was then named to the Russian team to compete at the European Championships alongside Angelina Melnikova, Angelina Simakova, Irina Alexeeva, and Uliana Perebinosova. They won gold in the team final, and individually, Akhaimova placed fifth on vault. On September 29, Akhaimova was named on the nominative team to compete at the World Championships in Doha, Qatar, alongside Alexeeva, Melnikova, Aliya Mustafina, and Simakova. On October 17, the Worlds team was officially announced and was unchanged from the nominative team. Akhaimova helped Russia win the silver medal behind the United States and ahead of China. She qualified for the floor exercise final and finished seventh.

After the World Championships, Akhaimova competed at the Elite Gym Massilia and won a silver medal with the Russian team, and she won gold medals in the vault and floor exercise finals. Then at the Cottbus World Cup, she finished sixth in the vault final. She then won silver medals on the vault and the balance beam at the Toyota International.

=== 2019 ===
Akhaimova won the silver medal on the floor exercise behind Angelina Melnikova at the Russian Championships. In July, she competed at the 2019 Summer Universiade alongside Tatiana Nabieva and Uliana Perebinosova. In the team final, Akhaimova helped Russia win the silver behind Japan. Individually, she won bronze in the all-around behind Hitomi Hatakeda of Japan and teammate Perebinosova. The following day, she won the silver medal on vault, behind Marina Nekrasova of Azerbaijan and just ahead of teammate Nabieva. Despite qualifying in first to the floor final, Akhaimova finished sixth in the final after counting a fall on her piked double Arabian. In August, Akhaimova competed at the Russian Cup. After two days of competition, she finished fourth in the all-around. In the event finals, she won gold on vault and bronze on floor exercise.

Shortly after the conclusion of the Russian Cup, Akhaimova was named to the nominative team for the World Championships alongside Angelina Melnikova, Daria Spiridonova, Anastasia Agafonova, Angelina Simakova (later replaced by Maria Paseka), and Aleksandra Shchekoldina. During the qualification round, she helped Russia qualify for the team final in third place behind the United States and China. Individually, she qualified for the all-around, vault, and floor exercise finals. The team won the silver medal in the team final with Akhaimova contributing scores on three apparatuses. Akhaimova finished twenty-second in the all-around final, seventh in the vault final, and eighth in the floor exercise final. After the World Championships, Akhaimova competed at Elite Gym Massilia where she placed fourth in the all-around and second on vault, behind Jennifer Gadirova of Great Britain. Then at the Toyota International, she won the silver medal on the vault behind Melnikova and the gold medal on the floor exercise.

=== 2020 ===
In January, it was announced that Akhaimova would represent Russia at the American Cup, taking place on March 7. However, in late February, Akhaimova and Nikita Nagornyy announced on Instagram that Russia withdrew from the upcoming competition due to the escalation of the COVID-19 pandemic worldwide. In late September, it was announced that Akhaimova would be competing at an upcoming competition in Hiroshima to take place in November alongside Angelina Melnikova, Elena Gerasimova, and Yana Vorona. However, she later withdrew due to a positive COVID-19 test. The test later turned out to be a false positive.

=== 2021 ===
Akhaimova competed at the Russian Championships in March; however, she withdrew from finals after sustaining a minor ankle injury. She next competed at the Russian Cup in June. During the all-around final, she finished fourth behind Viktoria Listunova, Vladislava Urazova, and Angelina Melnikova. Akhaimova placed first on vault and third on floor exercise. She was selected to represent the Russia at the 2020 Summer Olympics. However, it was undecided whether she would join Melnikova, Listunova, and Urazova on the four-person team or compete as an individual. In July, it was decided that Akhaimova would be a part of the team and Elena Gerasimova would compete as an individual alongside Anastasia Ilyankova. At the Olympic Games, Akhaimova qualified for the vault event final. Additionally, she helped the Russian Olympic Committee qualify for the team final in first place, ahead of the United States team. During the team final, Akhaimova only competed on the vault and helped the Russian team win the gold medal. Akhaimova finished sixth in the vault final.

=== 2022 ===
Akhaimova announced her retirement from the sport in June.

== Competitive history ==
Competitive history of Lilia Akhaimova
Year	Event	Team	AA	VT	UB	BB	FX
2013	Russian Championships	4	14				
2013	Russian Cup	1st place, gold medalist(s)	10	4			7
2013	Gymnasiade	1st place, gold medalist(s)					
2014	Russian Championships	3rd place, bronze medalist(s)	9	4			4
2014	Russian Cup	2nd place, silver medalist(s)	10	4			7
2014	Massilia Cup	2nd place, silver medalist(s)	20				
2014	Tournoi Pas-de-Calais	2nd place, silver medalist(s)	3rd place, bronze medalist(s)	1st place, gold medalist(s)			
2015	Russian Championships	4	15				
2015	Russian Cup	3rd place, bronze medalist(s)	7	8			5
2016	Russian Championships	4	12				
2016	Russian Cup	3rd place, bronze medalist(s)	8	7	8		1st place, gold medalist(s)
2016	Toyota International				4	7	
2016	Voronin Cup	1st place, gold medalist(s)		1st place, gold medalist(s)			1st place, gold medalist(s)
2017	Russian Championships	3rd place, bronze medalist(s)	5	2nd place, silver medalist(s)		4	1st place, gold medalist(s)
2017	DTB Pokal Team Challenge	1st place, gold medalist(s)					
2017	Osijek World Challenge Cup			5			3rd place, bronze medalist(s)
2017	Universiade	1st place, gold medalist(s)		2nd place, silver medalist(s)			3rd place, bronze medalist(s)
2017	Cottbus World Cup			2nd place, silver medalist(s)		7	1st place, gold medalist(s)
2018	Russian Cup		8	4	7		2nd place, silver medalist(s)
2018	European Championships	1st place, gold medalist(s)		5			
2018	World Championships	2nd place, silver medalist(s)		R1			7
2018	Elite Gym Massilia	2nd place, silver medalist(s)	4	1st place, gold medalist(s)			1st place, gold medalist(s)
2018	Cottbus World Cup			6			
2018	Toyota International			2nd place, silver medalist(s)	5	2nd place, silver medalist(s)	5
2019	Russian Championships	3rd place, bronze medalist(s)					2nd place, silver medalist(s)
2019	Universiade	2nd place, silver medalist(s)	3rd place, bronze medalist(s)	2nd place, silver medalist(s)			6
2019	Russian Cup		4	1st place, gold medalist(s)		5	3rd place, bronze medalist(s)
2019	World Championships	2nd place, silver medalist(s)	22	7			8
2019	Elite Gym Massilia		4	2nd place, silver medalist(s)			
2019	Toyota International			2nd place, silver medalist(s)	8	11	1st place, gold medalist(s)
2021	Russian Championships	5					
2021	Russian Cup		4	1st place, gold medalist(s)	7	5	3rd place, bronze medalist(s)
2021	Olympic Games	1st place, gold medalist(s)		6			

== See also ==
- List of Jews in sports
- List of Jewish Olympic medalists
