= Yeryomin =

Yeryomin, Eryomin, Yeremin or Eremin (Russian: Ерёмин) is a Russian masculine surname. Its feminine counterpart is Yeryomina, Eryomina, Yeremina or Eremina. The surname is derived from the male given name Yeryoma and literally means Yeryoma's. People with this surname include:

- Alexander Eremin (born 1995), Russian male curler
- Elena Eremina (born 2001), Russian artistic gymnast
- Larisa Eryomina (born 1950), Soviet stage and screen actress
- Mikhail Yeryomin (1968–1991), Soviet football player
- Natalia Eremina (born 1967), Latvian chess player
- Oleg Yeryomin (born 1967), Russian football player
- Pyotr Yeryomin (born 1992), Russian ice hockey goaltender
- Stanislav Yeryomin (born 1951), Russian basketball player
- Vasily Yeryomin (1943-2020), Russian naval officer
- Vladimir Yeryomin (born 1965), Russian football player
- Vladimir Yeryomin (born 1950), Russian actor, screenwriter and producer
- Yuri Yeryomin (1944–2025), Russian theatre director
