= 2019 Russian Artistic Gymnastics Championships =

Gymnastics competition in Russia

Russian Artistic Gymnastics Championships
- Location: Penza, Russia
- Date: March 6–10, 2019

The 2019 Russian Artistic Gymnastics Championships was held in Penza, Russia between 6–10 March 2019.

== Medalists ==
Event	Gold	Silver	Bronze
Women
Team	Moscow - 1 Aliya Mustafina; Angelina Simakova; Varvara Zubova; Maria Paseka; Seda Tutkhalyan; Ksenia Artemova	Central Federal District; Daria Elizarova; Anastasia Agafonova; Vlada Kotlyarova; Anastasia Budylkina; Angelina Melnikova; Taisiya Borodzdyko	St. Petersburg; Tatiana Nabieva; Elena Eremina; Varvara Batalova; Lilia Akhaimova; Ekate Mitrofanova; Catherine Boeva
All-around	Angelina Simakova	Angelina Melnikova	Aliya Mustafina
Vault	Maria Paseka	Angelina Melnikova	Tatiana Nabieva
Uneven bars	Anastasia Ilyankova	Anastasia Agafonova	Angelina Melnikova
Balance beam	Angelina Simakova	Angelina Melnikova	Ksenia Klimenko
Floor	Angelina Melnikova	Lilia Akhaimova	Aliya Mustafina

== Results ==
=== All-Around ===
Rank	Gymnast	Team	Vault (gymnastics)	Uneven bars	Balance beam	Floor (gymnastics)	Day 1	Total
1st place, gold medalist(s)	Angelina Simakova	Moscow	12.366	14.000	13.466	13.566	54.599	107.897
2nd place, silver medalist(s)	Angelina Melnikova	Central Federal District	14.266	14.166	13.066	11.633	54.332	107.463
3rd place, bronze medalist(s)	Aliya Mustafina	Moscow	13.700	14.100	12.533	13.200	53.865	107.398
4	Daria Belousova	Volga	13.166	13.666	12.533	12.966	53.833	106.164
5	Daria Elizarova	Central Federal District	13.566	12.633	13.366	12.733	53.665	105.963
6	Ksenia Klimenko	Ural	12.700	14.100	13.333	13.000	52.698	105.831
7	Tatiana Nabieva	St. Petersburg	14.000	13.200	12.066	12.133	52.232	103.631
8	Alexandra Shchekoldina	Ural	13.633	13.233	12.800	13.233	50.132	103.031
9	Anastasia Agafonova	Central Federal District	12.666	13.933	11.866	12.066	51.466	101.997
10	Polina Fedorova	Volga	13.600	12.866	11.333	12.466	51.265	101.530
11	Natalia Kapitonova	Volga	13.466	13.066	12.366	11.133	50.699	100.730
12	Seda Tutkhalyan	Moscow	13.233	11.700	11.366	12.033	52.198	100.530
13	Varvara Batalova	St. Petersburg	13.333	12.266	11.500	12.500	50.832	100.431
14	Ksenia Kamkova	Sverdlovsk	13.333	11.466	13.133	12.666	49.699	100.297
15	Elena Eremina	St. Petersburg	12.866	12.666	12.033	12.400	49.965	99.930
16	Vlada Kotlyarova	Central Federal District	12.700	12.800	12.833	11.733	48.932	98.998
17	Varvara Zubova	Moscow	13.400	11.233	13.066	11.933	49.266	98.898
18	Alina Stepanova	Northwestern Federal District	13.566	12.433	11.533	10.866	50.332	98.730
19	Yulia Biryulya	Siberia	14.266	12.100	9.733	11.966	49.532	97.597
20	Ekaterina Mitrofanova	St. Petersburg	13.433	11.200	11.733	12.100	48.499	96.965
21	Arina Ischuk	Siberia	12.866	12.866	10.600	11.433	47.932	95.697
22	Victoria Gazeeva	Moscow	13.066	11.733	10.433	11.433	48.900	95.565
23	Catherine Boeva	St. Petersburg	12.833	11.066	11.133	11.466	48.332	94.830
24	Ksenia Artemova	Moscow	12.700	11.533	9.266	10.366	49.432	93.297

=== Vault ===
Rank	Gymnast	Team	Vault 1	Vault 2	Average
Gold medal	Maria Paseka	Moscow			14.583
Silver medal	Angelina Melnikova	Central Federal District			14.183
Bronze medal	Tatiana Nabieva	St. Petersburg			13.949
4	Yulia Biryulya	Siberia			13.716
5	Eleonora Afanasyeva	Northwestern Federal District			13.566
6	Aleksandra Mayzel	Siberia			13.499
7	Ksenia Artemova	Moscow			13.199
8	Varvara Zubova	Moscow			12.783

=== Uneven Bars ===
Rank	Gymnast	Team	Total
Gold medal	Anastasia Ilyankova	Siberia	14.433
Silver medal	Anastasia Agafonova	Central Federal District	14.300
Bronze medal	Angelina Melnikova	Central Federal District	14.233
4	Aliya Mustafina	Moscow	14.000
5	Angelina Simakova	Moscow	13.366
6	Seda Tutkhalyan	Moscow	13.200
7	Daria Elizarova	Central Federal District	13.033
8	Ksenia Klimenko	Ural	12.933

=== Balance Beam ===
Rank	Gymnast	Team	Total
Gold medal	Angelina Simakova	Moscow	13.900
Silver medal	Angelina Melnikova	Central Federal District	13.500
Bronze medal	Ksenia Klimenko	Ural	13.166
4	Daria Elizarova	Central Federal District	13.100
5	Daria Belousova	Volga	12.969
6	Daria Skrypnik	Southern Federal District	12.666
7	Seda Tutkhalyan	Moscow	12.200
8	Aliya Mustafina	Moscow	11.833

=== Floor Exercise ===
Rank	Gymnast	Team	Total
Gold medal	Angelina Melnikova	Central Federal District	13.600
Silver medal	Lilia Akhaimova	St. Petersburg	13.233
Bronze medal	Aliya Mustafina	Moscow	13.133
4	Ksenia Klimenko	Ural	12.933
5	Alina Stepanova	Northwestern Federal District	12.633
6	Daria Elizarova	Central Federal District	12.600
7	Daria Belousova	Volga	12.266
8	Ksenia Kamkova	Sverdlovsk	11.600
