= Maria Kharenkova =

Russian-born Georgian artistic gymnast

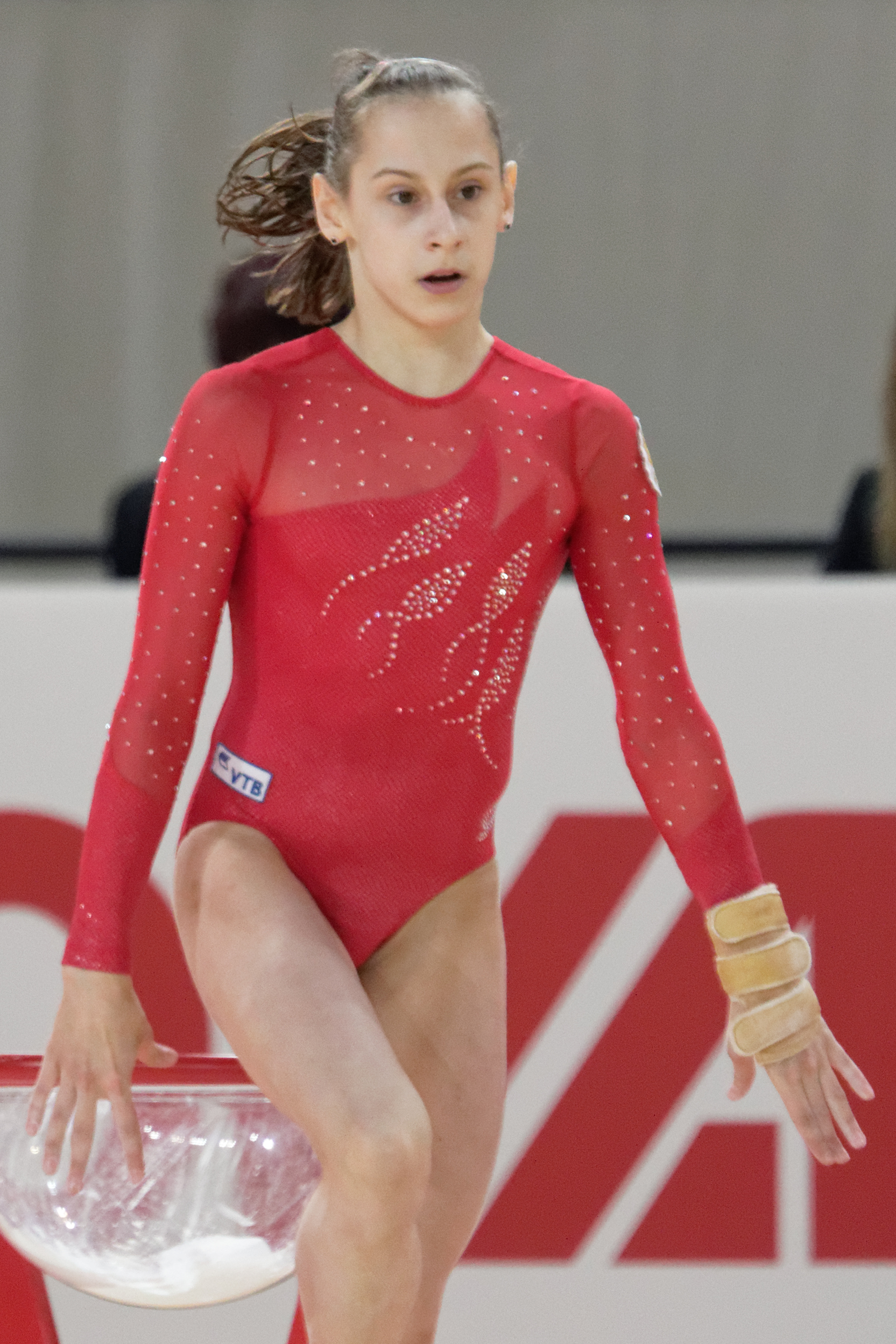
- Kharenkova at the 2015 European Championships

Personal information
- Full name: Maria Aleksandrovna Kharenkova
- Nicknames: Masha, Mashka
- Born: 29 October 1998 (age 28)

Gymnastics career
- Discipline: Women's artistic gymnastics
- Country represented: (Georgia (country)) Georgia; (2019–2021)
- Former countries represented: Russia (2010–2017)
- Head coach: Larisa Pirogova
- Assistant coaches: V.V. Yakubova; O.U. Kharenkova; L.R. Fudimova
- Former coach: Olga Sagina
Medal record
Representing Russia
World Championships
Bronze medal – third place	2014 Nanning	Team
European Championships
Gold medal – first place	2014 Sofia	Balance Beam
Silver medal – second place	2015 Montpellier	All-Around
Bronze medal – third place	2014 Sofia	Team

Maria Aleksandrovna Kharenkova (Russian: Мария Александровна Харенкова; born 29 October 1998) is a Russian former artistic gymnast. She is the 2014 European champion on the balance beam and was part of the bronze medal winning team at the 2014 World Championships. From 2019 until her retirement she represented Georgia.

== Gymnastics career ==
=== 2011–2013: Junior level ===
Kharenkova competed at the 2011 Russian Championships in Penza, Russia in the CMS division. She placed sixth in the all-around competition with a total score of 106.000. In event finals, she placed fifth on uneven bars and took gold on floor.

Kharenkova competed at the 2012 Pacific Rim Championships in Everett, United States. She placed fourth in the all-around competition with a score of 52.950. In event finals, she placed fourth on vault scoring 13.550 and third both on balance beam scoring 14.025 and on floor exercise scoring 13.950. Later that month she competed at the City of Jesolo Trophy. She helped the Russian team finish in third place and individually she placed third with an all-around score of 55.650. In event finals, she placed first on floor exercise with a score of 14.300.

She next competed at the 2012 European Championships. She contributed scores of 14.100 on vault, 14.100 on balance beam and 14.366 on floor toward the Russian team's first-place finish. Individually she finished sixth in the all-around competition (despite qualifying in first place) scoring 54.631. However, in event finals, she placed third on vault scoring 13.699, first on balance beam scoring 14.766 and also won gold on floor scoring 14.233. Kharenkova ended the year competing at the Elite Gym Massilia event in Marseille, France. She helped the Russian team finish in first place and individually she placed fourth in the all-around competition scoring 54.250. In event finals, she placed second on vault scoring 13.688 and first on floor scoring 14.550.

With teammates Maria Bondareva and Viktoria Kuzmina, Kharenkova competed at the 2013 European Youth Olympic Festival. She contributed an all-around score of 54.600 toward the Russian team's first-place finish. She won the all-around competition with a score of 54.950. In event finals, she placed seventh on balance beam scoring 13.100 and first on floor scoring 13.950. Later that year she competed at the Japan Junior International. She placed seventh in the all-around competition with a score of 54.900.

=== 2014–2018: Senior level ===
Kharenkova competed at the 2014 Cottbus World Cup. She placed second on balance beam and third on floor. She next competed at the 2014 European Championships. In the team final, she contributed scores of 13.933 on vault, 14.566 on beam and 13.766 on floor toward the Russian team's third-place finish. She then went on to win the balance beam title, scoring 14.933. She was selected to compete at the 2014 World Championships in Nanning, China alongside her teammates Aliya Mustafina, Daria Spiridonova, Ekaterina Kramarenko, Tatiana Nabieva, Alla Sosnitskaya and Polina Fedorova. During qualifications, she fell off of the balance beam and didn't make the event final. In the team final, Kharenkova contributed scores of 15.033 on balance beam and 13.233 on floor toward the Russian team's third-place finish.

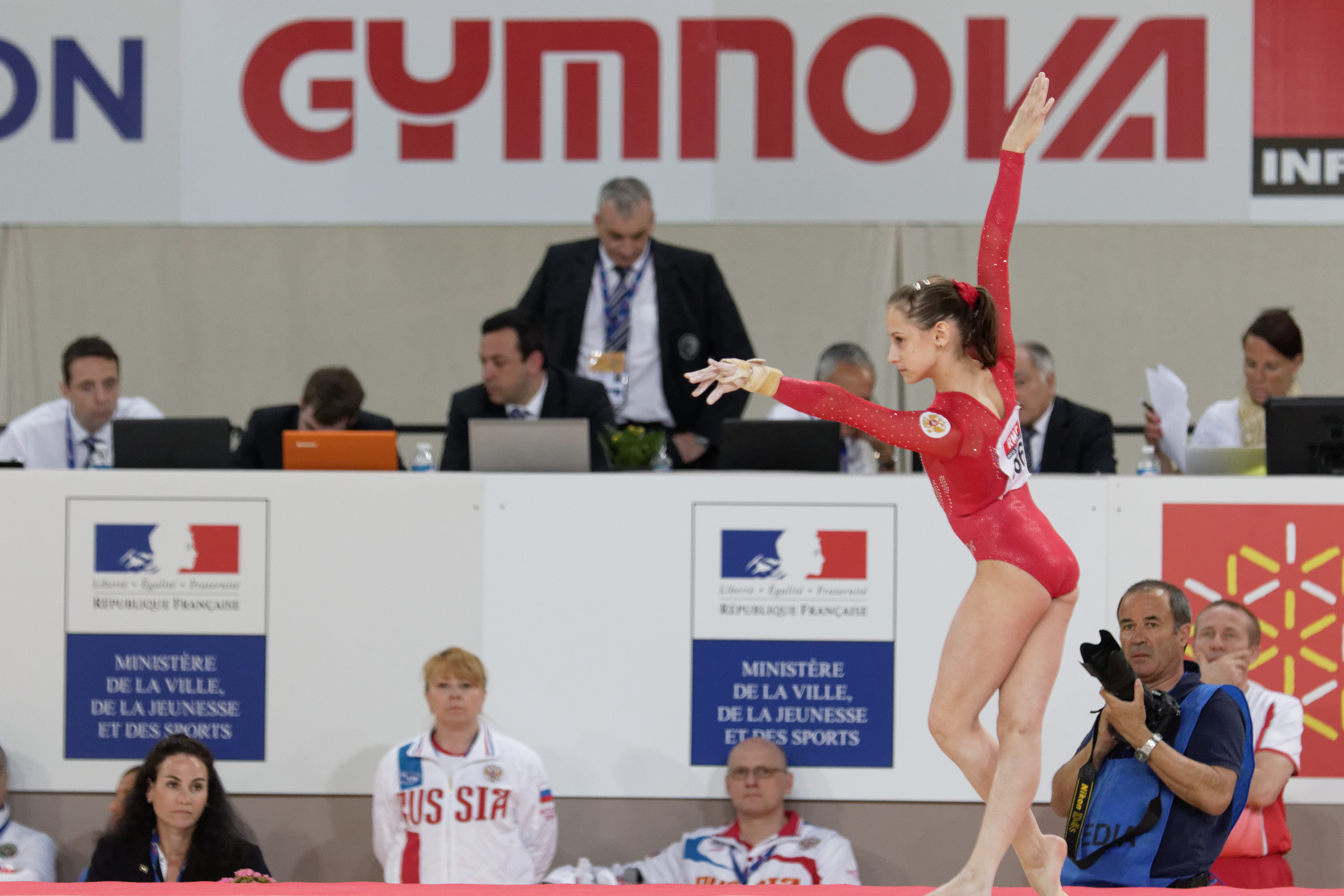
Kharenkova at the 2015 European Artistic Gymnastics Championships.

Kharenkova became the all-around champion at the 2015 National Championships. She also took the team title, balance beam title, placed fourth on the uneven bars, and placed third on floor exercise. Kharenkova competed at the 2015 European Championships in Montpellier, France. She won the silver medal in the all-around with a score of 57.132, behind Giulia Steingruber, after qualifying in first place. She also qualified into the uneven bars, balance beam and floor exercise finals. A heavy favorite and top-ranked qualifier for the balance beam final, she ended up falling in her routine and placing sixth. In October, Kharenkova competed at the 2015 World Championships. During the team final she contributed a score of 13.533 on balance beam toward Russia's fourth place finish.

Kharenkova suffered an ankle injury in 2016, thus she was unable to contend for a spot for the 2016 Olympic team.

Starting in the 2017 season, Kharenkova was coached by Larisa Pirogova. Khranekova competed at the 2017 Russian Cup where she won gold on floor exercise, silver on balance beam, and bronze in the all-around behind Elena Eremina.

=== 2019–2020: Representing Georgia ===
In 2019, Kharenkova officially switched nationalities, opting to compete for Georgia. She competed at the 2019 World Championships where she finished 98th in the all-around during the qualification round.

Kharenkova competed at the 2020 Baku World Cup; during qualifications she finished eighth on balance beam and therefore qualified to the event finals. However event finals were canceled due to the 2020 coronavirus outbreak in Azerbaijan.

== Coaching career ==
In early 2022 it was announced that Kharenkova had retired from competitive gymnastics. She became the balance beam coach for the Russian junior national team.

== Competitive history ==
Competitive history of Maria Kharenkova at the junior level
Year	Event	Team	AA	VT	UB	BB	FX
2011	National Championships		6		5		1st place, gold medalist(s)
2012	Pacific Rim Championships	6	4	4		3rd place, bronze medalist(s)	3rd place, bronze medalist(s)
2012	City of Jesolo Trophy	3rd place, bronze medalist(s)	3rd place, bronze medalist(s)				
2012	European Championships	1st place, gold medalist(s)	6	3rd place, bronze medalist(s)		1st place, gold medalist(s)	1st place, gold medalist(s)
2012	Massilia Cup	1st place, gold medalist(s)	4	2nd place, silver medalist(s)			1st place, gold medalist(s)
2013	Euro Youth Olympic Festival	1st place, gold medalist(s)	1st place, gold medalist(s)			7	1st place, gold medalist(s)
2013	Japan Junior International		7	5	4	4	

Competitive history of Maria Kharenkova at the senior level
Year	Event	Team	AA	VT	UB	BB	FX
2014	Cottbus World Cup					2nd place, silver medalist(s)	3rd place, bronze medalist(s)
2014	National Championships	1st place, gold medalist(s)			5	1st place, gold medalist(s)	
2014	European Championships	3rd place, bronze medalist(s)				1st place, gold medalist(s)	
2014	Russian Cup	3rd place, bronze medalist(s)	2nd place, silver medalist(s)		8	2nd place, silver medalist(s)	3rd place, bronze medalist(s)
2014	World Championships	3rd place, bronze medalist(s)					
2015	National Championships	1st place, gold medalist(s)	1st place, gold medalist(s)		4	1st place, gold medalist(s)	3rd place, bronze medalist(s)
2015	European Championships		2nd place, silver medalist(s)		7	6	7
2015	Russian Cup	2nd place, silver medalist(s)	3rd place, bronze medalist(s)		6	1st place, gold medalist(s)	3rd place, bronze medalist(s)
2015	World Championships	4					
2015	Voronin Cup	1st place, gold medalist(s)	1st place, gold medalist(s)		1st place, gold medalist(s)	1st place, gold medalist(s)	
2016	National Championships	1st place, gold medalist(s)	3rd place, bronze medalist(s)		7	2nd place, silver medalist(s)	3rd place, bronze medalist(s)
2016	Osijek World Cup					2nd place, silver medalist(s)	
2017	Russian Cup		3rd place, bronze medalist(s)			2nd place, silver medalist(s)	1st place, gold medalist(s)
2017	VTB Cup		2nd place, silver medalist(s)			1st place, gold medalist(s)	2nd place, silver medalist(s)
2017	Cottbus World Cup					3rd place, bronze medalist(s)	2nd place, silver medalist(s)
2017	Voronin Cup					1st place, gold medalist(s)	1st place, gold medalist(s)
2018	National Championships					8	
2018	Voronin Cup					1st place, gold medalist(s)	5
2019	Russian Cup		14				
2019	World Championships		98				
2019	Voronin Cup		3rd place, bronze medalist(s)	4	5	1st place, gold medalist(s)	1st place, gold medalist(s)
2020	Baku World Cup					(Note: Kharenkova qualified to the balance beam final; however event finals were canceled)	
2020	National Championships	3rd place, bronze medalist(s)	5			1st place, gold medalist(s)	5
2020	Voronin Cup		1st place, gold medalist(s)	3rd place, bronze medalist(s)	3rd place, bronze medalist(s)	1st place, gold medalist(s)	1st place, gold medalist(s)
2021	National Championships	2nd place, silver medalist(s)					

=== International Scores ===
Year	Competition Description	Location	Apparatus	Rank-Final	Score-Final	Rank-Qualifying	Score-Qualifying
2014	European Championships	Sofia	Team	3	169.329	3	170.621
2014	European Championships	Sofia	Balance Beam	1	14.933	2	15.066
2014	European Championships	Sofia	Floor Exercise			11	13.833
2014	World Championships	Nanning	Team	3	171.462	3	228.135
2014	World Championships	Nanning	Balance Beam			74	12.933
2014	World Championships	Nanning	Floor Exercise			19	13.666
2015	European Championships	Montpellier	All-Around	2	57.132	1	57.698
2015	European Championships	Montpellier	Uneven Bars	7	13.433	3	14.733
2015	European Championships	Montpellier	Balance Beam	6	13.200	1	15.033
2015	European Championships	Montpellier	Floor Exercise	7	13.933	5	14.066
2015	World Championships	Glasgow	Team	4	171.964	2	231.437
2015	World Championships	Glasgow	Uneven Bars			13	14.341
2015	World Championships	Glasgow	Balance Beam			7	14.366
2015	World Championships	Glasgow	Floor Exercise			64	13.300

== Floor music ==
Year	Music Title
2012	"Mirko"
2013	"Mas Zarzuela" (EYOF)
2013	"La Cumparsita" (Japan International)
2014	"Concavo y Convexo" and "Cama y Mesa" (mixed)

== See also ==
- Nationality changes in gymnastics
