= 2020 Voronin Cup =

Mikhail Voronin Cup
- Location: Penza, Russia
- Date: December 17–21, 2020

The 2020 Mikhail Voronin Cup took place on December 17–21 in Penza, Russia.

== Medal winners ==
=== Senior ===
Event	Gold	Silver	Bronze
Individual all-around	Maria Kharenkova (GEO)	Kristina Kazan (RUS)	Alyona Arkusha (RUS)
Vault	Alyona Arkusha (RUS)	Uliana Kuznetsova (RUS)	Maria Kharenkova (GEO)
Uneven Bars	Angelina Simakova (RUS)	Vlada Kotliarova (RUS)	Maria Kharenkova (GEO)
Balance Beam	Maria Kharenkova (GEO)	Angelina Simakova (RUS)	Uliana Perebinosova (RUS)
Floor Exercise	Maria Kharenkova (GEO)	Kristina Kazan (RUS)	Susanna Ovsepian (RUS)

=== Junior ===
Event	Gold	Silver	Bronze
Individual all-around	Diana Kustova (RUS)	Leila Vasileva (RUS)	Ksenia Blokhina (RUS)
Vault	Leila Vasileva (RUS)	Ursula Shakirova (RUS)	Diana Kustova (RUS)
Uneven Bars	Diana Kustova (RUS)	Leila Vasileva (RUS)	Ekaterina Tretiakova (RUS)
Balance Beam	Diana Kustova (RUS)	Ksenia Blokhina (RUS)	Marina Maliukevich (RUS)
Floor Exercise	Sabina Kaigulova (RUS)	Maria Tretiakova (RUS)	Diana Kustova (RUS)
