= Yeremey =

Yeremey or Eremey (diminutive: Yeryoma/Eryoma) is a Russian male given name, a russified version of Biblical prophet Jeremiah. The patronymic surnames Yeremeyev and Yeryomin are derived from it. In addition, there is a Romanian surname Eremei, which follows the Romanian tradition of surnames derived from Greek given names.

Notable people with the name include:

- Grigore Eremei (born 1935), Soviet and Moldovan politician
- Yeremey Konstantinovich, knyaz (prince) of Klin Principality
- Yeremey Parnov
