= 2019 Voronin Cup =

Mikhail Voronin Cup
- Location: Penza, Russia
- Date: November 29–30, 2019

The 2019 Mikhail Voronin Cup took place on November 29–30 in Penza, Russia.

== Medal winners ==
=== Senior ===
Event	Gold	Silver	Bronze
Individual all-around	Uliana Perebinosova (RUS)	Ganna Metelitsa (BLR)	Maria Kharenkova (GEO)
Vault	Alyona Arkusha (RUS)	Yuliana Deyeva (KAZ)	Marija Sajovko (LAT)
Uneven Bars	Anastasia Agafonova (RUS)	Elena Eremina (RUS)	Ganna Metelitsa (BLR)
Balance Beam	Maria Kharenkova (GEO)	Lee Woo-Young (KOR)	Aida Bauyrzhanova (KAZ)
Floor Exercise	Maria Kharenkova (GEO)	Aida Bauyrzhanova (KAZ)	Alyona Arkusha (RUS)

=== Junior ===
Event	Gold	Silver	Bronze
Individual all-around	Nelli Audi (RUS)	Jana Mahmoud (EGY)	Dildora Aripova (UZB)
Vault	Nelli Audi (RUS)	Ursula Shakirova (RUS)	Maisa Kuusikko (FIN)
Uneven Bars	Nelli Audi (RUS)	Maisa Kuusikko (FIN)	Ksenia Nechay (RUS)
Balance Beam	Nelli Audi (RUS)	Maisa Kuusikko (FIN)	Dildora Aripova (UZB)
Floor Exercise	Nelli Audi (RUS)	Jana Mahmoud (EGY)	Angelina Kosynkina (RUS)
