= Oksana Yeremeyeva =

Russian footballer

Personal information
- Full name: Oksana Yeremeyeva (Ryabinicheva)
- Date of birth: 21 February 1990 (age 36)
- Place of birth: Soviet Union
- Position: Defender

Senior career*
Years	Team	Apps	(Gls)
2005–2012	Energiya Voronezh		

International career
- Russia
- * Club domestic league appearances and goals

Oksana Yeremeyeva (nee Ryabinicheva) is a Russian football defender, playing for various clubs in the Russian Championship including Energiya Voronezh. She was a member of the Russian national team.

She is a spouse of Russian footballer Vladimir Yeremeyev.
