= Sergei Yeremeyev =

Sergei Vasilyevich Yeremeyev (Russian: Серге́й Васи́льевич Ереме́ев; born 1 August 1959, in Ust-Kamenogorsk, in the Kazakh SSR). He has lived in Moscow since 1993 and is known as a writer and an author of numerous popular verses for children. He is an active member of the Academy of Basic Sciences (Moscow) and The Russian Academy of Natural Sciences (Moscow). He was awarded first prize of the International Public Charitable Foundation, "The Russian Culture", for the best series of books for preschool children. He is also a member of the Writers' Union of Journalists of Russia.

== Career ==
His first published poem was "Evening city" in the regional newspaper of Rudny Altay (Kazakhstan, in 1971.).

He is also responsible for numerous publications in periodicals for children and adults (children's page) since 1984 including the magazine "Kolobok", the weekly newspaper "Week", the children's newspaper "Druzhnye rebyata" (Friendly Children), the magazines "Svirelka", "Mezhdu koshkoy i sobakoy" (Between cat and dog), "Spokoynoy nochi, malyshi!" (Good night, kids!) etc.

He is one of the authors of "The World Greatest Book for Kids" in collaboration with Sergey Mikhalkov, Vladimir Stepanov and Andrey Tyunyaev (2004, Moscow).

The general circulation of Sergey Yeremeyev books is approaching seven million copies.
