= Anastasia Ilyankova =

Russian artistic gymnast

- Анастасия Ильянкова
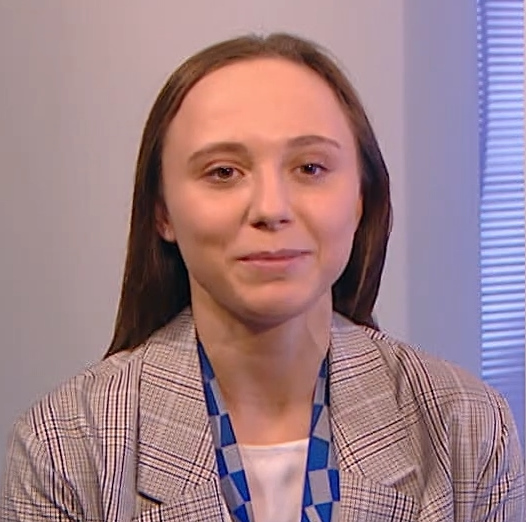
- Ilyankova in 2021

Personal information
- Full name: Anastasia Andreyevna Ilyankova
- Alternative name: Anastasiia Iliankova
- Nickname: Nastya
- Born: 12 January 2001 (age 25) Leninsk-Kuznetsky, Kemerovo Oblast, Russia

Gymnastics career
- Discipline: Women's artistic gymnastics
- Country represented: Russia (2014–2024)
- Club: Mametyev Kuzbass Gymnastics Sports School of Olympic Reserve
- Head coaches: Sergey Kiselev, Natalia Kiseleva
- Retired: January 6, 2025
Medal record
Representing ROC
Olympic Games
Silver medal – second place	2020 Tokyo	Uneven bars
Representing Russia
European Championships
Gold medal – first place	2019 Szczecin	Uneven bars
FIG World Cup
Event	1st	2nd	3rd
Apparatus World Cup	0	1	1
World Challenge Cup	1	1	0
Total	1	2	1

Anastasia Andreyevna Ilyankova (Russian: Анастасия Андреевна Ильянкова, IPA: [ɐnəstɐˈsʲijə ɪlʲjɪnˈkovə], born 12 January 2001) is a retired Russian artistic gymnast. She is the 2020 Olympic silver medalist, the 2019 European champion, and the 2019 and 2020 Russian champion on the uneven bars. She is a four-time FIG World Cup medalist, and she finished fourth on the uneven bars at the 2017 World Championships.

On the junior level, Ilyankova is the 2016 European team, uneven bars, and balance beam champion and the 2016 Russian all-around champion.

== Junior gymnastics career ==
Ilyankova began gymnastics when she was four years old because her older sister was also a gymnast.

Ilyankova made her international debut at the 2014 International Gymnix and won the team gold medal alongside Angelina Melnikova, Daria Skrypnik, and Ekaterina Sokova. In the event finals, she won the bronze medal on vault behind Shallon Olsen and Skrypnik and the silver medal on balance beam behind Rose-Kaying Woo. Then at the 2014 Voronin Cup, she won the team gold medal with Ekaterina Kramarenko. Individually, she won the all-around gold medal, the balance beam silver medal behind Sokova, and the vault bronze medal.

At the 2015 International Gymnix, Ilyankova helped the Russian team win the silver medal behind Canada, and she won silver on the uneven bars behind Natalia Kapitonova. Then at the European Youth Olympic Festival, she won a team gold medal alongside Daria Skrypnik and Elena Eremina. Ilyankova won the all-around bronze medal behind Skrypnik and Axelle Klinckaert and the uneven bars bronze medal behind Skrypnik and Nina Derwael. She won the gold medal on the uneven bars at the 2015 Junior Japan International.

Ilyankova began the 2016 season at the International Gymnix where the Russian team won the silver medal behind the United States. Individually, Ilyankova won the uneven bars gold medal. At the Russian Championships, she won the junior all-around title. She also won the uneven bars and floor exercise titles and the vault bronze medal. She was then selected to compete at the 2016 European Junior Championships alongside Elena Eremina, Uliana Perebinosova, Angelina Simakova, and Varvara Zubova, and they won the team gold medal. Ilyankova qualified for the all-around final and finished tenth after falling on both vault and balance beam. In the event finals, she won the gold medals on both the uneven bars and balance beam. Then at the Elite Gym Massilia, she won the all-around gold medal by over a point ahead of Eremina. In the event finals, she won gold on floor exercise, silver on uneven bars behind Irina Alexeeva, and silver on balance beam behind Mélanie de Jesus dos Santos.

== Senior gymnastics career ==
=== 2017 ===
Ilyankova was injured at the beginning of the 2017 season, competing only on uneven bars at the Russian Championships and finishing fourth. She made her senior international debut at the Osijek World Challenge Cup where she won gold on the uneven bars and silver on the balance beam behind Thaís Fidélis. She then competed at the Russian Cup, winning the uneven bars title and finishing fourth on the balance beam. She was then named to the Russian World Championships team. Although she struggled with a back injury in training, she still competed on the uneven bars and balance beam at the World Championships. She qualified for the uneven bars final in second place with a score of 15.066, less than a tenth of a point behind Elena Eremina. In the final, her foot hit the bar on her Shang release, incurring a 3-tenth deduction, leading her to take fourth place behind Nina Derwael of Belgium, Eremina, and Fan Yilin of China.

=== 2018 ===
Ilyankova began the season at the DTB Pokal Team Challenge, but the Russian team finished fifth and did not advance into the four-team team final. At the City of Jesolo Trophy, she competed in the all-around for the first time since 2016 and helped the Russian team win the gold medal. Individually, she won the all-around behind Americans Ragan Smith and Emma Malabuyo. In the event finals, she won the gold medal on the uneven bars and finished eighth on the balance beam. She finished sixth in the all-around at the Russian Championships, and she placed seventh on both the uneven bars and balance beam. Then at the Russian Cup, she won the silver medal in the all-around behind Angelina Melnikova. In the event finals, she won bronze medals on both balance beam and floor exercise.

=== 2019 ===
Ilyankova began the season at the Russian Championships and won the uneven bars title. As a result, she was chosen to compete at the European Championships alongside Angelina Simakova, Angelina Melnikova, and Maria Paseka. A week later, she competed at the Baku World Cup and won the silver medal on the uneven bars. Then at the Doha World Cup, she won the uneven bars bronze medal behind Nina Derwael and Fan Yilin. At the European Championships, Ilyankova won the gold medal on the uneven bars. In June, she was named as Aliya Mustafina's replacement for the European Games; she competed alongside Angelina Melnikova and Aleksandra Shchekoldina. During qualifications, she finished third on uneven bars behind Becky Downie of Great Britain and Nina Derwael of Belgium, qualifying to the event final. She later had to withdraw from the event final due to an allergic reaction. In August, she competed at the Russian Cup where she finished fourth on the uneven bars behind Daria Spiridonova, Vladislava Urazova, and Melnikova. She then competed at the Cottbus World Cup where she placed sixth on the uneven bars.

=== 2020 ===
Ilyankova began the 2020 season at the Melbourne World Cup, and she placed sixth on the uneven bars. She then competed at the Baku World Cup and during qualifications she finished second on uneven bars behind Fan Yilin. However, the event finals were canceled due to the COVID-19 pandemic in Azerbaijan. She did not compete again until November when she successfully defended her uneven bars title at the Russian Championships.

=== 2021 ===
Ilyankova competed at the Russian Championships where she finished seventh on uneven bars after falling off the apparatus, and she placed fifth on the balance beam. She next competed at the Russian Cup in June where she finished third on uneven bars behind Vladislava Urazova and Angelina Melnikova. Ilyankova was selected to represent the Russian Olympic Committee athletes at the 2020 Summer Olympics as an individual athlete. At the Olympic Games, she won the silver medal on the uneven bars behind two-time World champion Nina Derwael.

=== 2022–23 ===
Ilyankova did not compete in any international competitions in 2022 due to the International Gymnastics Federation banning Russian and Belarusian athletes for the 2022 Russian invasion of Ukraine. She chose to not compete at the Russian Championships. She returned to competition in July at the Russian Cup and finished eighth on the uneven bars. Then at the Spartakiade she finished fifth on the uneven bars.

Ilyankova finished eighth on the uneven bars at the 2023 Russian Championships.

In 2025, following the December 2023 death of her father (an army soldier) during the Russian invasion of Ukraine and her continuing health problems, she announced her retirement.

== Competitive history ==
Competitive history of Anastasia Ilyankova at the junior level
Year	Event	Team	AA	VT	UB	BB	FX
2014	International Gymnix	1st place, gold medalist(s)	7	3rd place, bronze medalist(s)		2nd place, silver medalist(s)	
2014	Voronin Cup	1st place, gold medalist(s)	1st place, gold medalist(s)	3rd place, bronze medalist(s)		2nd place, silver medalist(s)	
2015	International Gymnix	2nd place, silver medalist(s)			2nd place, silver medalist(s)		
2015	European Youth Olympic Festival	1st place, gold medalist(s)	3rd place, bronze medalist(s)		3rd place, bronze medalist(s)	8	
2015	Junior Japan International		8		1st place, gold medalist(s)		
2016	International Gymnix	2nd place, silver medalist(s)	4		1st place, gold medalist(s)	8	5
2016	Russian Championships	5	1st place, gold medalist(s)	3rd place, bronze medalist(s)	1st place, gold medalist(s)	7	1st place, gold medalist(s)
2016	European Championships	1st place, gold medalist(s)	10		1st place, gold medalist(s)	1st place, gold medalist(s)	
2016	Elite Gym Massilia	1st place, gold medalist(s)	1st place, gold medalist(s)		2nd place, silver medalist(s)	2nd place, silver medalist(s)	1st place, gold medalist(s)

Competitive history of Anastasia Ilyankova at the senior level
Year	Event	Team	AA	VT	UB	BB	FX
2017	Russian Championships				4		
2017	Osijek World Challenge Cup				1st place, gold medalist(s)	2nd place, silver medalist(s)	
2017	Russian Cup				1st place, gold medalist(s)	4	
2017	World Championships				4		
2018	City of Jesolo Trophy	1st place, gold medalist(s)	3rd place, bronze medalist(s)		1st place, gold medalist(s)	8	
2018	Russian Championships		6		7	7	
2018	Russian Cup		2nd place, silver medalist(s)		5	3rd place, bronze medalist(s)	3rd place, bronze medalist(s)
2019	Russian Championships				1st place, gold medalist(s)		
2019	Baku World Cup				2nd place, silver medalist(s)		
2019	Doha World Cup				3rd place, bronze medalist(s)		
2019	European Championships				1st place, gold medalist(s)		
2019	European Games				WD		
2019	Russian Cup				4		
2019	Cottbus World Cup				6		
2020	Melbourne World Cup				6		
2020	Baku World Cup				2		
2020	Russian Championships	5			1st place, gold medalist(s)		
2021	Russian Championships	6			7	5	
2021	Russian Cup				3rd place, bronze medalist(s)		
2021	Olympic Games				2nd place, silver medalist(s)		
2022	Russian Cup				8		
2022	Spartakiade				5		
2023	Russian Championships				8		
