= Vladimir Yeremeyev =

Russian footballer

Personal information
- Full name: Vladimir Yegorovich Yeremeyev
- Date of birth: 21 November 1988 (age 37)
- Place of birth: Voronezh, Russian SFSR
- Height: 1.75 m (5 ft 9 in)
- Position: Midfielder

Youth career
- FC FCS-73 Voronezh

Senior career*
Years	Team	Apps	(Gls)
2008	FC FCS-73 Voronezh	29	(5)
2009	FC Fakel Voronezh	12	(4)
2009	FC Lokomotiv Liski	0	(0)
2010–2013	FC Fakel Voronezh	66	(9)
2013–2015	FC Metallurg Lipetsk	31	(8)
2015–2016	FC Zenit Penza	22	(1)
- * Club domestic league appearances and goals

Vladimir Yegorovich Yeremeyev (Russian: Владимир Егорович Еремеев; born 21 November 1988) is a former Russian professional football player. He is 175 centimeters tall and plays position midfield.

== Club career ==
He played in the Russian Football National League for FC Fakel Voronezh in the 2011–12 season.

== Personal life ==
He is married to Russian football player Oksana Yeremeyeva (nee Ryabinicheva).
