= Aleksandra Shchekoldina =

Russian artistic gymnast

- Алекса́ндра Щеко́лдина
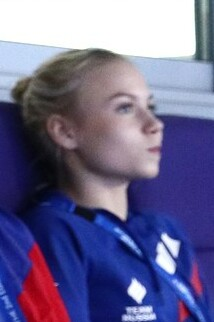
- Shchekoldina at the 2019 European Games

Personal information
- Full name: Aleksandra Eduardovna Shchekoldina
- Born: 11 July 2002 (age 24)

Gymnastics career
- Discipline: Women's artistic gymnastics
- Country represented: Russia; (2015–2021)
Medal record
Representing Russia
World Championships
Silver medal – second place	2019 Stuttgart	Team

Aleksandra Eduardovna Shchekoldina (Russian: Алекса́ндра Эдуа́рдовна Щеко́лдина; born 11 July 2002) is a retired Russian artistic gymnast. She is the 2016 Russian national junior champion in vault and silver medalist in the team competition, in all-around, and on beam.

== Gymnastics career ==
=== 2019 ===
Shchekoldina was named to Russia's team for the 2019 European games alongside Angelina Melnikova and Anastasia Iliankova. In the qualification round, Shchekoldina competed on all four events and qualified to the all-around final in ninth with a total score of 51.565. In the final, she totaled a 52.365 and finished in fifth.

In July, Shchekoldina went to train in Tokyo for a week with the Russian national team in preparation for the 2020 Tokyo Olympics. Others in attendance included Olympic champion Aliya Mustafina.

Shortly after the conclusion of the Russian Cup Shchekoldina was named to the nominative team for the 2019 World Championships alongside Angelina Melnikova, Daria Spiridonova, Lilia Akhaimova, Anastasia Agafonova, and Angelina Simakova (later replaced by Maria Paseka). There, she helped Russia win the silver medal behind the United States.

=== 2020 ===
In early February it was announced that Shchekoldina was selected to represent Russia at the Birmingham World Cup taking place in late March. However, the Birmingham World Cup was canceled due to the COVID-19 pandemic in the United Kingdom.

In November, Shchekoldina competed at the Friendship & Solidarity Competition in Tokyo. She was on the Solidarity Team, that won gold.

== Competitive history ==
Year	Event	Team	AA	VT	UB	BB	FX
Senior
2019	National Championships	5	8				
2019	DTB Team Challenge	2nd place, silver medalist(s)					
2019	European Games		5				
2019	Russian Cup		8				4
2019	World Championships	2nd place, silver medalist(s)					
2019	Arthur Gander Memorial		5				
2019	Swiss Cup	6					
2019	Cottbus World Cup						R3
2020	Friendship & Solidarity Meet	1st place, gold medalist(s)					
2021	National Championships	9	12	8			
