= Angelina Simakova =

Russian artistic gymnast

Angelina Simakova Ангелина Симакова
- Full name: Angelina Alekseevna Simakova
- Born: 26 August 2002 (age 24)

Gymnastics career
- Discipline: Women's artistic gymnastics
- Country represented: Russia (2014–2021)
- Head coach: Irina Kolobova
Medal record
Representing Russia
World Championships
| Silver medal – second place | 2018 Doha | Team |
European Championships
| Gold medal – first place | 2018 Glasgow | Team |

Angelina Alekseevna Simakova (Russian: Ангелина Алексеевна Симакова, born 26 August 2002) is a retired Russian artistic gymnast. She is the 2019 Russian national all-around champion and the 2018 Russian national all-around silver medalist. Internationally, she was a member of the Russian teams that won gold at the 2018 European Championships and silver at the 2018 World Championships.

== Gymnastics career ==
=== 2014 ===
Simakova competed at the 2014 Gym Festival in Trnava, winning the team junior and all-around gold medal.

=== 2018 ===
In April Simakova made her senior international debut at the Tokyo World Cup where she finished fourth behind Mai Murakami of Japan, Trinity Thomas of the United States, and Mélanie de Jesus dos Santos of France. Later that month she competed at the Russian National Championships where she won silver behind Angelina Melnikova in the all-around. She additionally won silver on floor exercise, once again behind Melnikova, and placed fifth on vault on fourth on uneven bars. In July she competed at the Russian Cup where she placed fourth in the all-around behind Melnikova, Anastasia Ilyankova, and Viktoria Komova. She placed first on floor exercise, eighth on vault, and third on uneven bars.

On 20 July, Simakova was named to the Russian team to compete at the 2018 European Championships alongside Angelina Melnikova, Irina Alexeeva, Lilia Akhaimova, and Uliana Perebinosova. Together they won gold in the team finals.

On 29 September, Simakova was named on the nominative team to compete at the 2018 World Championships in Doha, Qatar alongside Lilia Akhaimova, Irina Alexeeva, Angelina Melnikova, and Aliya Mustafina. On October 17, the Worlds team was officially announced and was unchanged from the nominative team. Although Simakova originally planned on competing all four events in qualifications, she only competed on vault, balance beam, and uneven bars after hurting her ankle. During qualifications, although she scored a 0 on her vault after crashing it, Russia still qualified to the team final in second place. During team finals Simakova only competed on balance beam where she helped Russia win the silver medal behind the United States.

=== 2019 ===
In March, Simakova won the all-around at the Russian National Championships. As a result she was chosen to compete at the 2019 European Championships alongside Angelina Melnikova, Maria Paseka, and Anastasia Ilyankova. Later in March Simakova competed at the EnBW DTB-Pokal Team Challenge in Stuttgart where she helped Russia win the silver medal in the team final. Individually she placed fifth in the all-around. After a subpar performance, Simakova was replaced by Aliya Mustafina on the European Championships team. She was added back onto the Euros team after Mustafina withdrew.

At the European Championships qualified to the all-around final in sixteenth place and was the first reserve for the balance beam final. During the all-around final Simakova finished in ninth place after falling twice.

In August Simakova competed at the Russian Cup. After two days of competition she finished sixth in the all-around competition. Shortly after the conclusion of the Russian Cup Simakova was named to the nominative team for the 2019 World Championships alongside Angelina Melnikova, Daria Spiridonova, Lilia Akhaimova, and Aleksandra Shchekoldina. She was later injured during the training camp and was replaced by Maria Paseka.

=== 2020 ===
In February it was announced that Simakova would represent Russia at the Tokyo World Cup taking place on April 4. The Tokyo World Cup was later canceled due to the coronavirus pandemic in Japan. In December Simakova competed at the Voronin Cup. She only competed on uneven bars and balance beam, placing first and second respectively.

=== 2022 ===
Simakova received a two year ban for doping (furosemide) starting June 2, 2022.

== Competitive history ==
| Year | Event | Team | AA | VT | UB | BB | FX |
Espoir
| 2013 | Russian Hopes (1st Class) | | 1st place, gold medalist(s) | | | | 3rd place, bronze medalist(s) |
| 2014 | National Championships (Youth 1st) | | 1st place, gold medalist(s) | 1st place, gold medalist(s) | 1st place, gold medalist(s) | | 3rd place, bronze medalist(s) |
| 2014 | Gym Festival Trnava | 1st place, gold medalist(s) | 1st place, gold medalist(s) | | | | |
| 2014 | Russian Hopes (1st Class) | 4 | 1st place, gold medalist(s) | 1st place, gold medalist(s) | 1st place, gold medalist(s) | 3rd place, bronze medalist(s) | |
| 2015 | L'International Gymnix | 2nd place, silver medalist(s) | 5 | | | 4 | 3rd place, bronze medalist(s) |
| 2015 | National Championships (KMS) | 1st place, gold medalist(s) | 1st place, gold medalist(s) | 1st place, gold medalist(s) | 2nd place, silver medalist(s) | 2nd place, silver medalist(s) | 1st place, gold medalist(s) |
| 2015 | Lugano Trophy | | 2nd place, silver medalist(s) | | | | |
Junior
| 2016 | National Championships (MS) | | 4 | 4 | 5 | 3rd place, bronze medalist(s) | 2nd place, silver medalist(s) |
| 2016 | European Championships | 1st place, gold medalist(s) | | | | | |
| 2017 | WOGA Classic | 3rd place, bronze medalist(s) | 1st place, gold medalist(s) | 3rd place, bronze medalist(s) | 2nd place, silver medalist(s) | 1st place, gold medalist(s) | 1st place, gold medalist(s) |
| 2017 | Junior Japan International | | 4 | 1st place, gold medalist(s) | 4 | | 6 |
| 2017 | Elite Gym Massilia | 2nd place, silver medalist(s) | 1st place, gold medalist(s) | 5 | 2nd place, silver medalist(s) | 1st place, gold medalist(s) | 1st place, gold medalist(s) |
Senior
| 2018 | Tokyo World Cup | | 4 | | | | |
| 2018 | National Championships | 1st place, gold medalist(s) | 2nd place, silver medalist(s) | 5 | 4 | | 2nd place, silver medalist(s) |
| 2018 | Russian Cup | | 4 | 8 | 3rd place, bronze medalist(s) | | 1st place, gold medalist(s) |
| 2018 | European Championships | 1st place, gold medalist(s) | | | | | |
| 2018 | World Championships | 2nd place, silver medalist(s) | | | | | |
| 2018 | Joaquin Blume Memorial | | 3rd place, bronze medalist(s) | | | | |
| 2019 | National Championships | 1st place, gold medalist(s) | 1st place, gold medalist(s) | | 5 | 1st place, gold medalist(s) | |
| 2019 | EnBW DTB-Pokal Challenge | 2nd place, silver medalist(s) | 5 | | | | |
| 2019 | European Championships | | 9 | | | | |
| 2019 | Russian Cup | | 6 | | 8 | | 6 |
| 2020 | Voronin Cup | | | | 1st place, gold medalist(s) | 2nd place, silver medalist(s) | |
| 2021 | National Championships | 1st place, gold medalist(s) | | | | | |

=== International Scores ===
| Year | Competition Description | Location | Apparatus | Rank-Final | Score-Final | Rank-Qualifying | Score-Qualifying |
|---|---|---|---|---|---|---|---|
| 2018 | European Championships | Glasgow | Team | 1 | 165.195 | 2 | 161.462 |
| 2018 | European Championships | Glasgow | Vault | | | 9 | 13.783 |
| 2018 | European Championships | Glasgow | Balance Beam | | | 29 | 12.333 |
| 2018 | European Championships | Glasgow | Floor Exercise | | | 9 | 13.066 |
| 2018 | World Championships | Doha | Team | 2 | 162.863 | 2 | 165.497 |
| 2018 | World Championships | Doha | Uneven Bars | | | 68 | 12.366 |
| 2018 | World Championships | Doha | Balance Beam | | | 13 | 13.400 |
| 2019 | European Championships | Szczecin | All-Around | 9 | 51.465 | 16 | 51.965 |
| 2019 | European Championships | Szczecin | Uneven Bars | | | 16 | 13.666 |
| 2019 | European Championships | Szczecin | Balance Beam | | | 9 | 13.066 |
| 2019 | European Championships | Szczecin | Floor Exercise | | | 48 | 11.933 |
