= Ksenia Kamkova =

Russian artistic gymnast

- Full name: Ksenia Anatolyevna Kamkova
- Born: 5 December 2002 (age 23)

Gymnastics career
- Discipline: Women's artistic gymnastics
- Country represented: Russia

Ksenia Anatolyevna Kamkova (Russian: Ксе́ния Анато́льевна Камко́ва; born 5 December 2002) is a Russian artistic gymnast. She is the 2018 Russian national silver medalist on beam.
