= Daria Spiridonova =

Russian artistic gymnast

Daria Nagornaya Дарья Нагорная
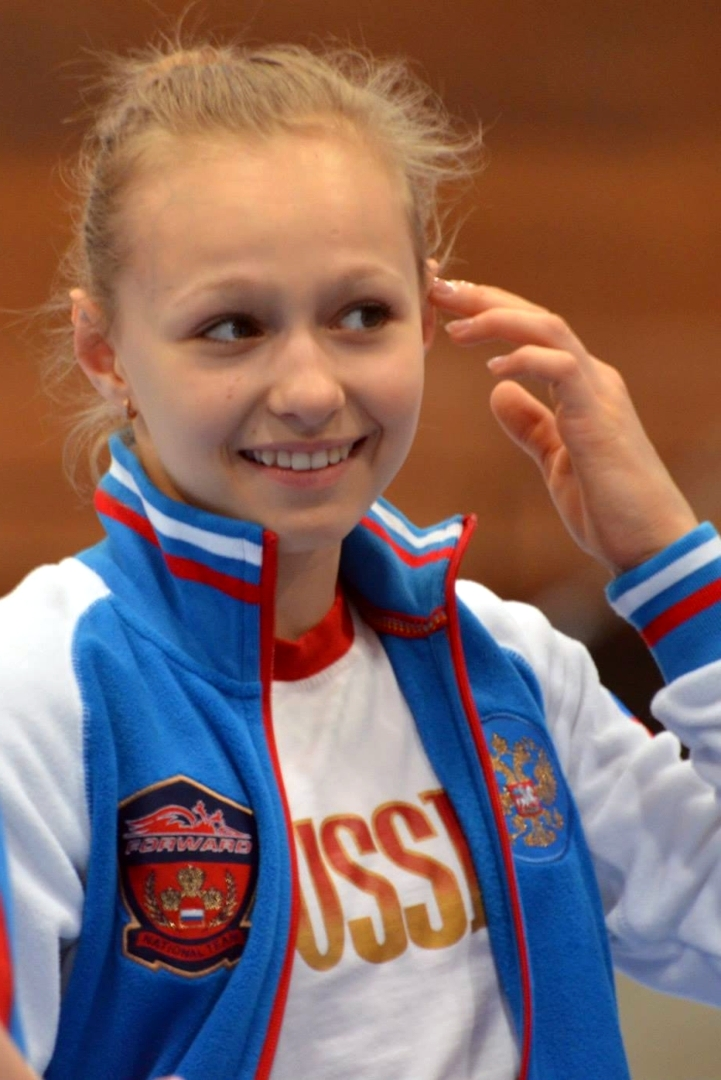
- Spiridonova at the 2014 European Championships

Personal information
- Full name: Daria Sergeyevna Nagornaya
- Alternative name: Daria Spiridonova
- Nickname: Dasha
- Born: 8 July 1998 (age 28) Novocheboksarsk, Russia
- Height: 156 cm (5 ft 1 in)
- Spouse: Nikita Nagornyy (m. 2018)

Gymnastics career
- Discipline: Women's artistic gymnastics
- Country represented: Russia; (2010–2020)
- Club: Sambo 70 / Central Army Sports Club (CSKA)
- Head coach: Tatiana Fomkina
- Retired: 17 February 2021
Medal record
Representing Russia
Olympic Games
Silver medal – second place	2016 Rio de Janeiro	Team
World Championships
Gold medal – first place	2015 Glasgow	Uneven Bars
Silver medal – second place	2018 Doha	Team
Silver medal – second place	2019 Stuttgart	Team
Bronze medal – third place	2014 Nanning	Team
Bronze medal – third place	2014 Nanning	Uneven Bars
European Championships
Gold medal – first place	2015 Montpellier	Uneven Bars
Gold medal – first place	2016 Bern	Team
Silver medal – second place	2016 Bern	Uneven Bars
Bronze medal – third place	2014 Sofia	Team
Bronze medal – third place	2014 Sofia	Uneven Bars
Summer Universiade
Gold medal – first place	2017 Taipei	Team
Gold medal – first place	2017 Taipei	Uneven Bars

Daria Sergeyevna Nagornaya (née Spiridonova Russian: Дарья Сергеевна Нагорная née Спиридонова; born 8 July 1998) is a Russian former artistic gymnast. Primarily an uneven bars specialist, she is the 2015 World Champion, the 2015 European Champion, the 2014 World bronze medalist, and a four-time Russian national (2014–17) champion on the apparatus. She represented Russia at the 2016 Summer Olympics, winning a silver medal in the team competition. She was also a member of the gold-medal-winning team at the 2016 European Championships, the silver-medal-winning teams at the 2018 and 2019 World Championships, and the bronze-medal-winning teams at the 2014 World and 2014 European championships.

== Gymnastics career ==
=== Junior career ===
Spiridonova made her international debut at the 2012 Pre-Olympic Youth Cup in Bergisch-Gladbach, Germany, where she won the all-around gold medal.

In 2013 she won gold with her team and silver on uneven bars at the Russian Junior Championships. She competed at the Olympic Hopes, winning gold with her team and on uneven bars, bronze in the all-around, and placing fifth on vault. She went on to compete at the KSI Cup, winning gold medals with her team and in the all-around.

=== 2014 ===
Spiridonova's senior debut came at the 2014 Cottbus World Cup, but she did not make any event finals. She then competed at the Russian Championships in April, winning gold on uneven bars, silver with her team and on balance beam, and placing fifth in the all-around, and seventh on floor exercise.

At the 2014 European Championships, Spiridonova competed on uneven bars, balance beam, and floor exercise. She scored 14.900 on uneven bars which qualified her to the event finals in fourth place. She also scored a 14.058 on balance beam and 11.900 on floor exercise after a fall. In the team final, Spiridonova contributed scores of 15.066 on uneven bars, 12.300 on balance beam and 13.100 on floor exercise towards the Russian team's bronze medal finish.

Individually, she won the bronze medal in the uneven bars final with a score of 15.283. In October she placed first ahead of Larisa Iordache at the Arthur Gander Memorial, her first international win at the senior level. Days later, she partnered up with male Russian gymnast Nikita Ignatyev to win her second international title at the Swiss Cup. At the Massila Master, she claimed the first all-around crown of her career.

=== 2015 ===
Spiridonova competed at the 2015 Russian Championships in Penza, Russia. She won silver with her team, as well as placing fourth in the all around, winning gold on the uneven bars, and silver on the balance beam. Due to her strong performance, Spiridonova was selected to compete at the 2015 European Championships in Montpellier, France. She placed thirteenth in the all around final after complications on balance beam and floor exercise. Despite this she went on to win gold on the uneven bars, beating out the reigning European uneven bars champion Becky Downie.

At the 2015 World Championships Spiridonova won gold on uneven bars in an unprecedented four way tie alongside compatriot Viktoria Komova, American Madison Kocian, and Fan Yilin of China.

=== 2016 ===
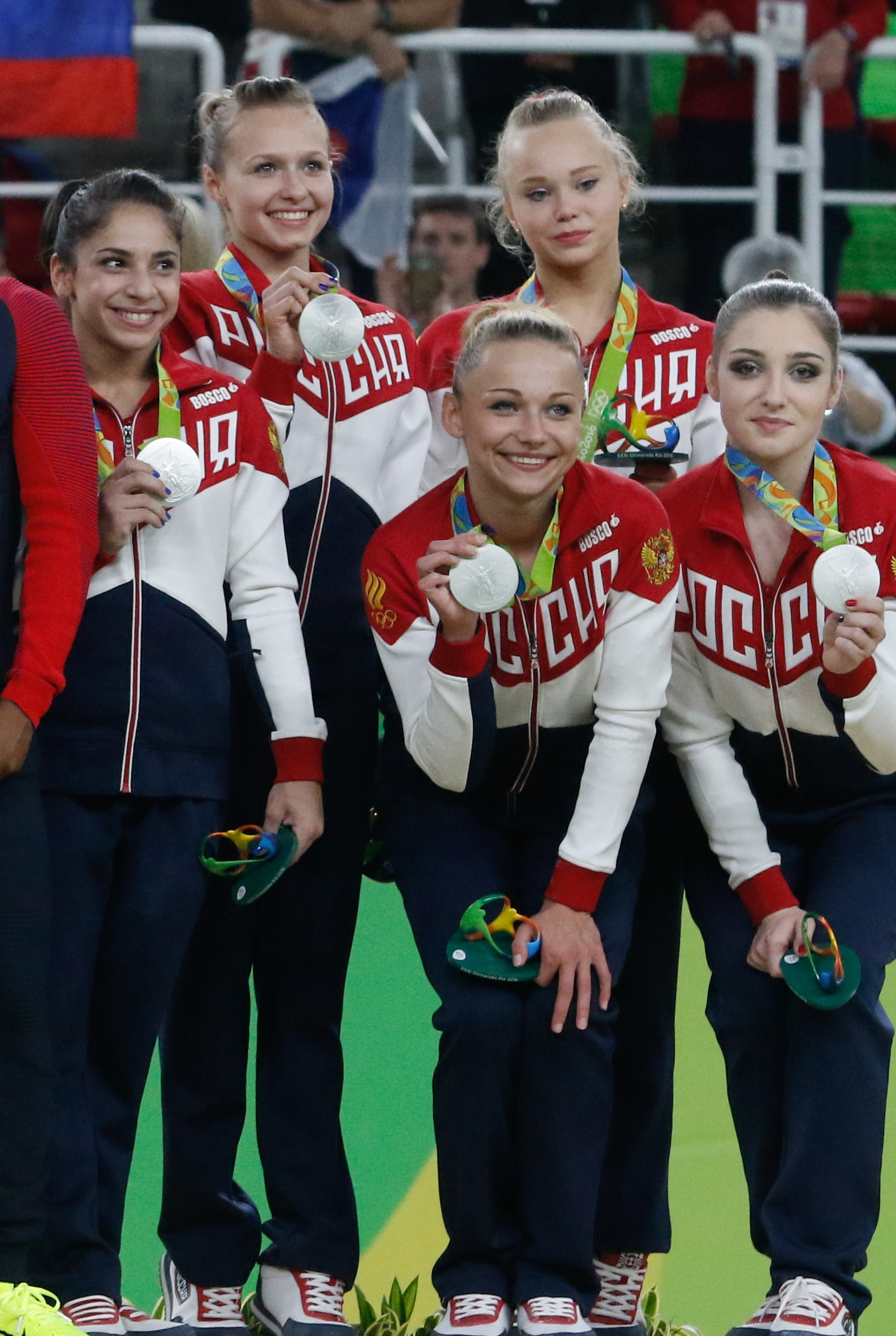
Spiridonova (second from left) and the Russian team with their Olympic silver medals

Spiridonova competed at the Russian National Championships where she won a silver medal with her team and tied for gold on the uneven bars with Daria Skrypnik. At the conclusion of the National Championships, Spiridonova, along with Aliya Mustafina, Angelina Melnikova, Seda Tutkhalyan, and Ksenia Afanasyeva, was selected to compete for Russia at the 2016 European Championships. She helped Russia qualify to the team final in second place and finished in fourth on the uneven bars with a score of 14.733. Although she originally did not qualify to the final due to two-per-country limitations, she did replace teammate Melnikova in the uneven bars final because of her strength on the event. In the team final she contributed a score of 15.333 on uneven bars, helping Russia win the gold medal with an overall score of 175.212. She won the silver medal on the uneven bars, losing to Becky Downie.

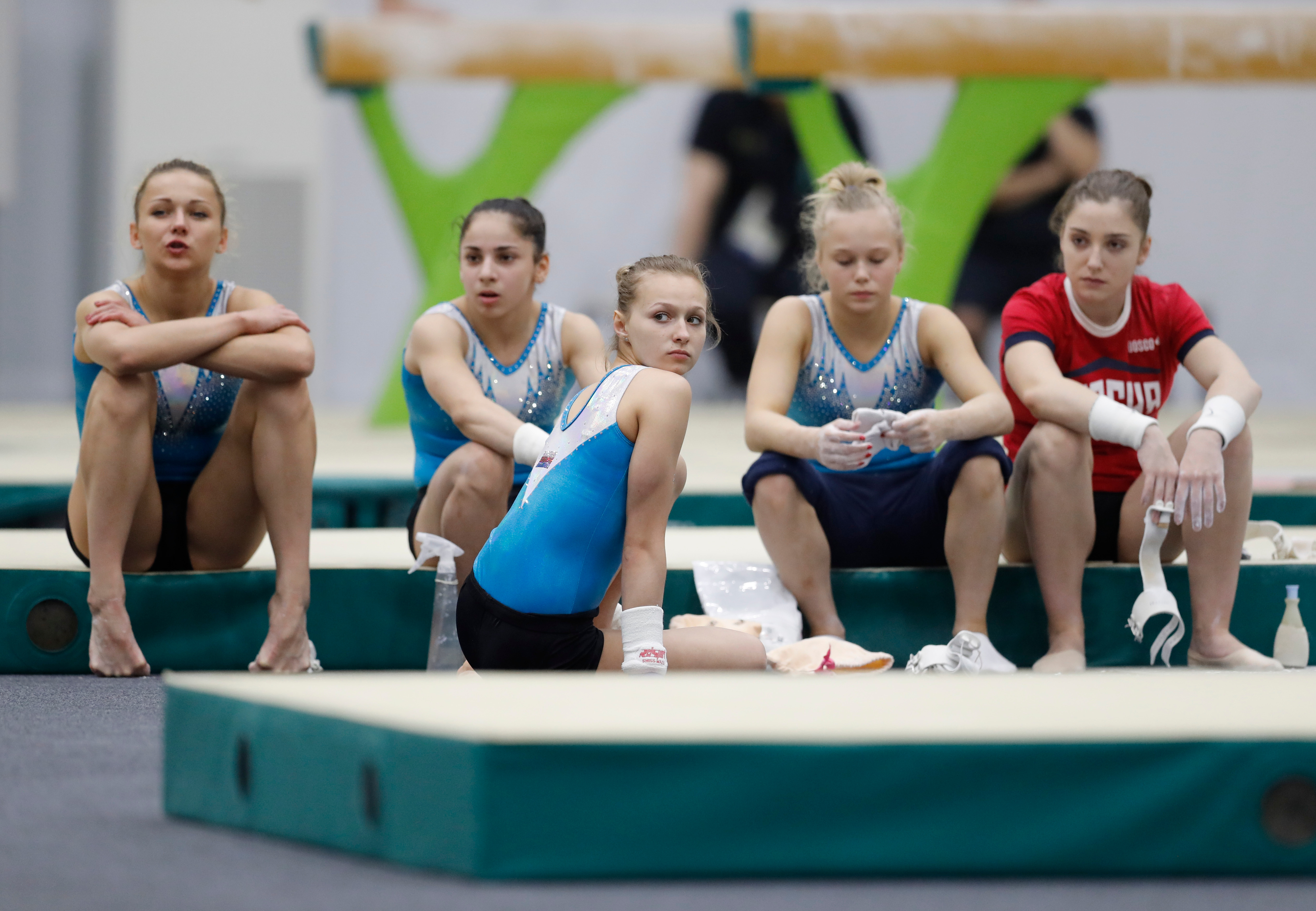
Spiridonova (center) with the Russian Team at the 2016 Rio Olympics

At the 2016 Russian Cup, Spridonova finished fourth with her team and won bronze on the uneven bars. At the conclusion of the Russian Cup, Spiridonova, along with Mustafina, Tutkhalyan, Melnikova, and Maria Paseka, was selected to represent Russia at the 2016 Summer Olympics in Rio de Janeiro, Brazil. In the midst of the Team Russia Doping Scandal, both the men's and women's gymnastics teams were cleared to compete days before the Games began.

At the 2016 Olympic Games Spiridonova helped Russia qualify to the team final in third place. She also qualified to the uneven bars final in fourth place. In the team final she contributed a score of 15.100 on uneven bars, helping Russia win the silver medal with an overall score of 176.688. In the uneven bars final she fell on one of her transition skills and finished in eighth place.

=== 2018 ===
On 17 October Russia announced the team to compete at the 2018 World Championships and Spirdonova was chosen as the alternate. She received a silver medal with the team behind the USA and ahead of China. On 18 December Spiridonova married fellow Russian gymnast Nikita Nagornyy.

=== 2019 ===
Spiridonova was out for the majority of the season due to a comminuted ankle fracture she sustained in late 2018. In August she returned to competition at the Russian Cup where she only competed on uneven bars and balance beam. She won gold on uneven bars, finishing ahead of 2019 Junior World Uneven Bars Champion Vladislava Urazova and 2019 European Games Uneven Bar Champion Angelina Melnikova. Shortly after the conclusion of the Russian Cup Spiridonova was named to the nominative team for the 2019 World Championships alongside Melnikova, Lilia Akhaimova, Angelina Simakova (later replaced by Maria Paseka), Anastasia Agafonova, and Aleksandra Shchekoldina.

During qualifications at the World Championships she competed on the uneven bars and helped Russia qualify to the team final in third place behind the United States and China. Individually she qualified to the uneven bars final in second place behind reigning World Champion Nina Derwael of Belgium. Despite Valentina Rodionenko's, the head coach of the Russian Women's gymnastics team, low expectations for the team, they won the silver medal in the team final, with Spiridonova contributing the second highest uneven bars score of the day (behind Becky Downie of Great Britain). During the uneven bars final Spiridonova finished in sixth place.

=== 2020 ===
In late January Spiridonova was listed on a nominative roster that was released for the Melbourne World Cup, scheduled to take place on 20 February. While there she placed third on uneven bars behind Diana Varinska of Ukraine and Georgia Godwin of Australia. She later competed at the Baku World Cup; during qualifications she finished fourth on uneven bars and therefore qualified to the event finals. However event finals were canceled due to the 2020 coronavirus outbreak in Azerbaijan.

=== 2021 ===
On 17 February 2021 Spiridonova announced on her Instagram page that she retired from gymnastics.

== Awards ==
- Medal of the Order of Merit for the Fatherland, 1st class (August 25, 2016) — for outstanding sporting achievements at the Games of the XXXI Olympic Games in 2016 in Rio de Janeiro (Brazil), for showing the will to win and determination.

== Personal life ==
On December 18, 2018, she married Olympic gymnastics champion Nikita Nagorny. On June 21, 2023, the couple welcomed their first child, a son named Mark. In February 2026, Daria and Nikita announced they are currently expecting their second child, a girl.

== Competitive history ==
Competitive history of Daria Spiridonova at the junior level
Year	Event	Team	AA	VT	UB	BB	FX
2011	National Championships (CMS)				3rd place, bronze medalist(s)	3rd place, bronze medalist(s)	5
2012	Pre-Olympic Youth Cup		1st place, gold medalist(s)				
2013	National Championships (MS)				2nd place, silver medalist(s)		
2013	Olympic Hopes	1st place, gold medalist(s)		5	1st place, gold medalist(s)		
2013	KSI Cup	1st place, gold medalist(s)	1st place, gold medalist(s)				

Competitive history of Daria Spiridonova at the senior level
Year	Event	Team	AA	VT	UB	BB	FX
2014	Cottbus World Cup						
2014	National Championships	2nd place, silver medalist(s)	5		1st place, gold medalist(s)	2nd place, silver medalist(s)	7
2014	European Championships	3rd place, bronze medalist(s)			3rd place, bronze medalist(s)		
2014	Russian Cup	1st place, gold medalist(s)	3rd place, bronze medalist(s)		3rd place, bronze medalist(s)	3rd place, bronze medalist(s)	
2014	World Championships	3rd place, bronze medalist(s)			3rd place, bronze medalist(s)		
2014	Arthur Gander Memorial		1st place, gold medalist(s)				
2014	Swiss Cup	1st place, gold medalist(s)					
2014	Massilia Cup (Master Massilia)	2nd place, silver medalist(s)	1st place, gold medalist(s)		1st place, gold medalist(s)		
2015	National Championships	2nd place, silver medalist(s)	4		1st place, gold medalist(s)	2nd place, silver medalist(s)	
2015	European Championships		13		1st place, gold medalist(s)		
2015	Rusudan Sikharulidze tournament	1st place, gold medalist(s)					
2015	Russian Cup	1st place, gold medalist(s)	1st place, gold medalist(s)		3rd place, bronze medalist(s)	3rd place, bronze medalist(s)	6
2015	World Championships	4			1st place, gold medalist(s)		
2015	Toyota International Cup				1st place, gold medalist(s)	5	
2016	DTB Pokal Team Challenge Cup	1st place, gold medalist(s)					
2016	National Championships	2nd place, silver medalist(s)	7		1st place, gold medalist(s)	5	
2016	European Championships	1st place, gold medalist(s)			2nd place, silver medalist(s)		
2016	Russian Cup	4			3rd place, bronze medalist(s)		
2016	Olympic Games	2nd place, silver medalist(s)			8		
2016	Elite Gym Massilia (Master)	1st place, gold medalist(s)	6			5	
2017	Reykjavik International Games		2nd place, silver medalist(s)				
2017	National Championships	1st place, gold medalist(s)	7		1st place, gold medalist(s)	8	
2017	DTB Pokal Team Challenge Cup	1st place, gold medalist(s)					
2017	City of Jesolo Trophy	3rd place, bronze medalist(s)	18		7		
2017	Universiade	1st place, gold medalist(s)	8		1st place, gold medalist(s)	8	
2018	National Championships	1st place, gold medalist(s)	11				
2018	Russian Cup		14		6		
2018	World Championships	(silver) (Note: Spiridonova was the Team RUS alternate.)					
2018	Cottbus World Cup				4		
2018	Toyota International				1st place, gold medalist(s)		
2019	Russian Cup				1st place, gold medalist(s)	8	
2019	World Championships	2nd place, silver medalist(s)			6		
2020	Melbourne World Cup				3rd place, bronze medalist(s)		
2020	Baku World Cup				4		
