= Anastasia Agafonova =

Russian artistic gymnast

Anastasia Agafonova Анастасия Агафонова
- Full name: Anastasia Nikolaevna Agafonova
- Nickname: Nastya
- Born: 4 August 2003 (age 23) Kovrov, Russia

Gymnastics career
- Discipline: Women's artistic gymnastics
- Country represented: Russia (2017–2021)
- Head coaches: Anna Kulikova, Lyudmila Popova
Medal record
Event	1st	2nd	3rd
World Championships	0	1	0
Total	0	1	0
Representing Russia
World Championships
Silver medal – second place	2019 Stuttgart	Team

Anastasia Nikolaevna Agafonova (Russian: Анастасия Николаевна Агафонова; born 4 August 2003) is a Russian artistic gymnast. She was part of the Russian team that won silver at the 2019 World Championships.

== Career ==
Agafonova trains at the Vladimir Oblast Specialized Children's and Youth Sports School for the Olympic Reserve in Artistic Gymnastics.

=== Junior career: 2016-2018 ===
Agafonova competed at the 2016 Russian Espoir Championships where she finished 4th in the all-around and won the silver medal on the uneven bars behind Ksenia Klimenko. She competed at the 2017 City of Jesolo Trophy with Klimenko, Valeria Saifulina, and Varvara Zubova, and they won the bronze medal in the team competition behind the United States and Italy. At the 2017 Russian Junior Championships, she won the silver medal in the individual all-around, the bronze medal on the uneven bars and the silver medal on the balance beam. Agafonova missed 2018 season due to injury.

=== Senior career: 2019-present ===
In March, Agafonova competed at the senior Russian Championships, winning team and bars silver and placing ninth in the individual all-around. In late May, Agafonova won the uneven bars at the World Challenge Cup event in Osijek, Croatia. She also competed at the World Challenge Cup in Paris where she won the gold medal on the balance beam as well as the silver medal on the uneven bars behind Melanie de Jesus dos Santos.

Agafonova was part of the Russian team that competed at the 2019 World Championships in Stuttgart. Alongside her, the team included Angelina Melnikova, Lilia Akhaimova, Aleksandra Shchekoldina, Daria Spiridonova, and Maria Paseka (alternate), and they won silver in the team final. She then competed at the FIG World Cup in Cottbus where she won the silver medal on the uneven bars behind Fan Yilin. Her last event of the season was the Voronin Cup, and she won the gold medal on the uneven bars.
