= Elena Eremina =

Russian artistic gymnast

- Full name: Elena Vyacheslavovna Eremina
- Alternative names: Yelena Yeryomina, Helena Yeremina
- Nickname: Lena
- Born: 29 July 2001 (age 25)

Gymnastics career
- Discipline: Women's artistic gymnastics
- Country represented: Russia (2012–2020)
- Head coach: Alexandra Kiryashova
- Retired: April 4, 2022
Medal record
Representing Russia
World Championships
Silver medal – second place	2017 Montreal	Uneven Bars
Bronze medal – third place	2017 Montreal	All-Around
European Championships
Silver medal – second place	2017 Cluj-Napoca	Uneven Bars

Elena Vyacheslavovna Eremina (Russian: Елена Вячеславовна Ерёмина, pron. Yelena Vyacheslavovna Yeryomina, born 29 July 2001) is a retired Russian artistic gymnast. She is the 2017 World all-around bronze medalist and the 2016 European junior all-around champion.

== Personal life ==
Eremina has an official YouTube account on which she makes vlogs. She has 2 older sisters and her family lives in St. Petersburg. In 2025, she announced on her Instagram account that she had moved to Jeddah, Saudi Arabia, to work as a gymnastics coach.

== Junior gymnastics career ==
=== 2012–2014 ===
Eremina's elite debut came at the 2012 Dityatin Cup, where she placed sixteenth in the all-around. She returned to the Dityatin Cup the following year and took home team, all-around, and uneven bars gold medals, a balance beam bronze medal, and placed fourth on floor exercise. She competed at the Russian Hopes competition, winning vault, uneven bars, and balance beam, and placing fifth in the all-around and sixth with her team. Her international debut came at the Pas de Calais International in France, where she won all-around, uneven bars, balance beam, and floor exercise gold, team silver, and vault bronze medals.

=== 2015–2016 ===
Eremina competed at the Junior Russian Championships on April 1–4, 2015. She placed 4th with her team, and individually placed 4th in the all-around, won a gold on the vault, a bronze on the uneven bars, a silver on the balance beam, and placed 6th on the floor

Eremina competed at the 2016 European Championships where she became the all-around champion. She qualified in 3 apparatus finals finishing 6th in vault, 8th in floor and a bronze medal in balance beam. With her late July 2001 birthdate, Eremina becomes a senior elite gymnast in 2017, missing the 2016 Rio Olympics by almost eight months.

== Senior gymnastics career ==
=== 2017 ===
Eremina made her senior debut at the 2017 Russian Artistic Gymnastics Championships. On the first day of competition she helped her team to win the bronze medal, and earning the top all around score after the first day. Her performance also earned her spots in all event finals with the exception of vault. On the second day of competition, the all around final, she dropped to second place after falling on both bars and beam, allowing Natalia Kapitonova to win the title. In event finals, Eremina finished 5th with a clean routine on the uneven bars, suffered another fall on beam to finish 5th, and then clinched silver in the floor exercise after a clean, but relatively easy routine. She was selected to compete at the Team competition in Stuttgart. In the qualifying round, she had mistakes on vault, fell on bars, and completed solid routines on beam and floor to help place Russia second after the first round. In the final she did a slightly better vault, a clean routine on bars and beam, but had a fall on floor to help Russia win the team competition.

She was selected as a part of the Russian team for the 2017 European Championships alongside Olympic alternate Natalia Kapitonova and Olympic medalists Angelina Melnikova and Maria Paseka. She was the only first year senior on the Russian team. In qualifying, she had clean routines on all of the events except beam, where she fell. Her performances qualified her 4th in the all around, 3rd in the uneven bars and 3rd in the floor exercise. She was the top Russian qualifier to the all around. In the all around final, she performed well on both the vault and uneven bars, putting her in 3rd halfway through the competition. However, a fall on beam hurt her chances. Even with the fall, she was still in 3rd place after 3 rotations. On floor she performed another clean routine, but a high scoring vault from France's Melanie De Jesus Dos Santos meant that Eremina would finish just off the podium, in 4th. The next day Eremina competed in the uneven bars final. She had a clean routine for a score of a 14.3, good enough to win silver behind Nina Derwael of Belgium.

On August 23–27, Eremina competed at the Russian Cup held in Ekaterinburg, she won silver medals in the all-around, team, uneven bars, floor exercise and a bronze in balance beam. After the competition, was selected to represent Russia at the World Championships, along with Angelina Melnikova, Maria Paseka and Anastasia Ilyankova.

In Montréal, Eremina competed in the all-around on the first day of competition, qualifying in fifth for the all-around final (54.999), sixth for the balance beam final (13.233), and first to the uneven bars final, with the highest score of 15.100. In the all around, she did a clean vault, beam and floor. Her only major mistake came on the uneven bars where she received a half point deduction for buckling her knees on the way up to a handstand. However, she still managed to win the bronze medal, her first international all-around medal. The next day in the Uneven Bars final, she went in qualified in first, but she won the silver medal after world champion Fan Yilin of China upgraded her routine to defend her title.

=== 2018 ===
In February, Eremina underwent spinal surgery in Munich in order to stabilise her two lumbar vertebrae. Because of this, she announced that she would resume training around August, and would miss the 2018 European and World Championships. In May, Eremina was seen at Round Lake and went to the national team training camp in Mallorca. Following the 2018 European Championships head coach of the Russian program, Valentina Rodionenko, commented that Eremina had begun training seriously again, but that she would not be considered for World Championships selection due to a lack of preparation and as not to risk further injury.

=== 2019 ===
In March, Eremina attended the Russian Championships with downgraded routines, placing 16th in the all around qualifications. All of Eremina's scores were in the 12s, with a 12.966 on bars her highest. In June she competed at the Korea Cup. She finished eighth on floor exercise, seventh on balance beam, and fifth on uneven bars. Once again her highest score came on uneven bars with a 12.000.

In August Eremina competed at the Russian Cup. After two days of competition she finished tenth in the all-around competition. In November she competed at the 2019 Voronin Cup where she won silver on uneven bars behind Anastasia Agafonova and placed fourth on balance beam.

== Competitive history ==
Year	Event	Team	AA	VT	UB	BB	FX
Junior
2012	Dityatin Cup		6		4	3rd place, bronze medalist(s)	
2012	Pas de Calais International (Espoirs)	3rd place, bronze medalist(s)	1st place, gold medalist(s)	4	1st place, gold medalist(s)	2nd place, silver medalist(s)	3rd place, bronze medalist(s)
2013	Dityatin Cup	1st place, gold medalist(s)	1st place, gold medalist(s)	4	1st place, gold medalist(s)	3rd place, bronze medalist(s)	4
2013	Russian Hopes (1st Class)	6	5	1st place, gold medalist(s)	1st place, gold medalist(s)	1st place, gold medalist(s)	
2013	Pas de Calais International (Espoirs)	2nd place, silver medalist(s)	1st place, gold medalist(s)	3rd place, bronze medalist(s)	1st place, gold medalist(s)	1st place, gold medalist(s)	1st place, gold medalist(s)
2014	National Championships (CMS)	4	1st place, gold medalist(s)	1st place, gold medalist(s)	1st place, gold medalist(s)		
2014	FinGym			1st place, gold medalist(s)		1st place, gold medalist(s)	1st place, gold medalist(s)
2014	Pas de Calais International	2nd place, silver medalist(s)	2nd place, silver medalist(s)		2nd place, silver medalist(s)		
2015	National Championships (MS)	4	4	1st place, gold medalist(s)	3rd place, bronze medalist(s)	2nd place, silver medalist(s)	6
2015	Diyatin Cup	1st place, gold medalist(s)	1st place, gold medalist(s)	1st place, gold medalist(s)	2nd place, silver medalist(s)	1st place, gold medalist(s)	2nd place, silver medalist(s)
2015	European Youth Olympic Festival	1st place, gold medalist(s)		3rd place, bronze medalist(s)			6
2015	Junior Japan International		3rd place, bronze medalist(s)	5	8	8	6
2015	Pas de Calais International	1st place, gold medalist(s)	1st place, gold medalist(s)	1st place, gold medalist(s)	1st place, gold medalist(s)	1st place, gold medalist(s)	3rd place, bronze medalist(s)
2016	National Championships (MS)	7	3rd place, bronze medalist(s)	2nd place, silver medalist(s)	2nd place, silver medalist(s)	1st place, gold medalist(s)	
2016	European Championships	1st place, gold medalist(s)	1st place, gold medalist(s)	6		3rd place, bronze medalist(s)	8
2016	Elite Gym Massilia (Master)	1st place, gold medalist(s)	2nd place, silver medalist(s)	2nd place, silver medalist(s)	6		
2016	Voronin Cup	1st place, gold medalist(s)	1st place, gold medalist(s)	2nd place, silver medalist(s)	2nd place, silver medalist(s)		
Senior
2017	National Championships	3rd place, bronze medalist(s)	2nd place, silver medalist(s)		5	5	2nd place, silver medalist(s)
2017	DTB Pokal Team Challenge Cup	1st place, gold medalist(s)					
2017	City of Jesolo Trophy	3rd place, bronze medalist(s)	4		1st place, gold medalist(s)		6
2017	European Championships		4		2nd place, silver medalist(s)		8
2017	Russian Cup	2nd place, silver medalist(s)	2nd place, silver medalist(s)		2nd place, silver medalist(s)	3rd place, bronze medalist(s)	2nd place, silver medalist(s)
2017	World Championships		3rd place, bronze medalist(s)		2nd place, silver medalist(s)	5	
2017	Toyota International			6	2nd place, silver medalist(s)	7	8
2018	did not compete						
2019	National Championships	3rd place, bronze medalist(s)	15				
2019	Korea Cup				7	5	8
2019	Russian Cup		10				
2019	Voronin Cup				2nd place, silver medalist(s)	4	
2020	National Championships	1st place, gold medalist(s)	4		5	2nd place, silver medalist(s)	
2021	National Championships	5	9				

== International Scores ==
Year	Competition Description	Location	Apparatus	Rank-Final	Score-Final	Rank-Qualifying	Score-Qualifying
2017	European Championships	Cluj-Napoca	All-Around	4	54.266	4	54.698
2017	European Championships	Cluj-Napoca	Uneven Bars	2	14.300	3	14.466
2017	European Championships	Cluj-Napoca	Balance Beam			35	12.133
2017	European Championships	Cluj-Napoca	Floor Exercise	8	13.466	3	13.633
2017	World Championships	Montreal	All-Around	3	54.799	5	54.999
2017	World Championships	Montreal	Uneven Bars	2	15.100	1	15.100
2017	World Championships	Montreal	Balance Beam	5	12.966	6	13.233
2017	World Championships	Montreal	Floor Exercise			25	12.800
