= Anastasiya Miroshnichenko =

Uzbek artistic gymnast

Anastasiya Miroshnichenko Анастасия Мирошниченко
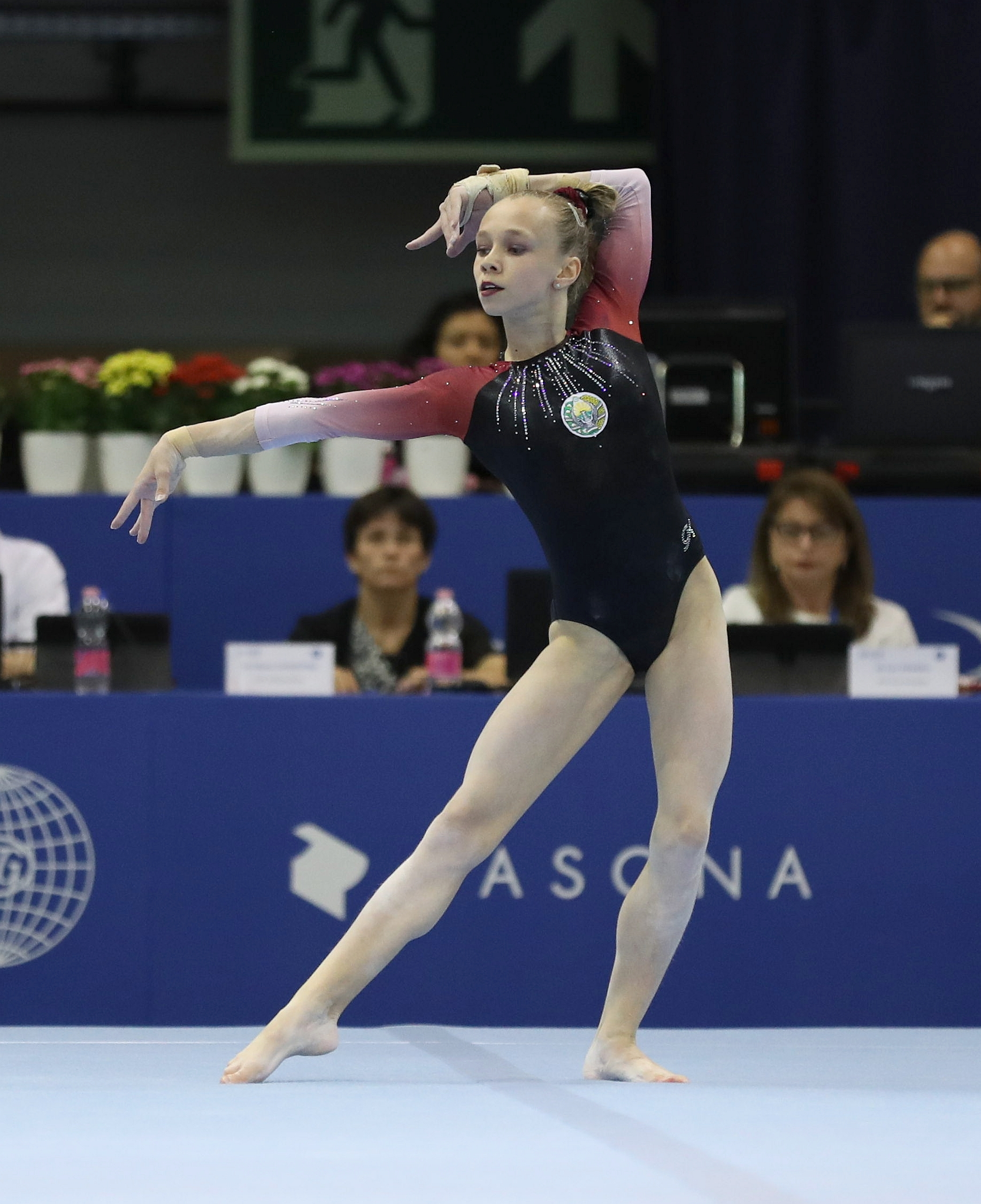
- Miroshnichenko at the 2019 Junior World Championships

Personal information
- Full name: Anastasiya Olegovna Miroshnichenko
- Born: March 30, 2004 (age 22) Fergana, Uzbekistan

Gymnastics career
- Discipline: Women's artistic gymnastics
- Country represented: Uzbekistan; (2013–2022)
- Club: Specialised Gymnastics Youth Sports School
- Head coach: Oleg Miroshnichenko
- Assistant coach: Elena Druzhinina
Medal record
Women's artistic gymnastics
Representing Uzbekistan
South Central Asian Championships
Gold medal – first place	2021 Dhaka	Team
Gold medal – first place	2021 Dhaka	All-Around
Gold medal – first place	2021 Dhaka	Vault
Gold medal – first place	2021 Dhaka	Floor Exercise
Silver medal – second place	2021 Dhaka	Uneven Bars

Anastasiya Olegovna Miroshnichenko (Russian: Анастасия Олеговна Мирошниченко, born 30 March 2004) is an Uzbek former artistic gymnast. She represented Uzbekistan at the inaugural junior World Championships.

== Early life ==
Miroshnichenko was born in Fergana, Uzbekistan. She began training in gymnastics in 2008 and joined the national team of Uzbekistan in 2013.

== Gymnastics career ==
=== 2017–2019: Junior ===
Miroshnichenko made her international debut at the 2017 Republican Open Competitions in Minsk where she placed first in the all-around, on vault, and on floor exercise and won bronze on the uneven bars. She next competed at the 2017 junior Asian Gymnastics Championships. She placed tenth in the all-around, fifth on uneven bars and floor exercise, and seventh on vault. She next competed at the 2017 Voronin Cup where she won bronze in the all-around behind Russians Aleksandra Shchekoldina and Vladislava Urazova. Additionally she placed fourth on vault and uneven bars, sixth on floor exercise, and seventh on balance beam.

Miroshnichenko began the 2018 season competing at the President's Cup in Almaty. She won gold in the all-around, vault, and balance beam, won silver on the uneven bars, and placed fifth on floor exercise. She next competed at the 2018 Junior Asian Championships where she placed seventh in the all-around and fourth on vault and uneven bars.

In June 2019, Miroshnichenko competed at the inaugural Junior World Championships alongside Dildora Aripova and Anna Silnova. Miroshnichenko finished 33rd in the all-around and was the highest placing Uzbek gymnast. She placed 15th on vault during qualification but did not advance to the event final.

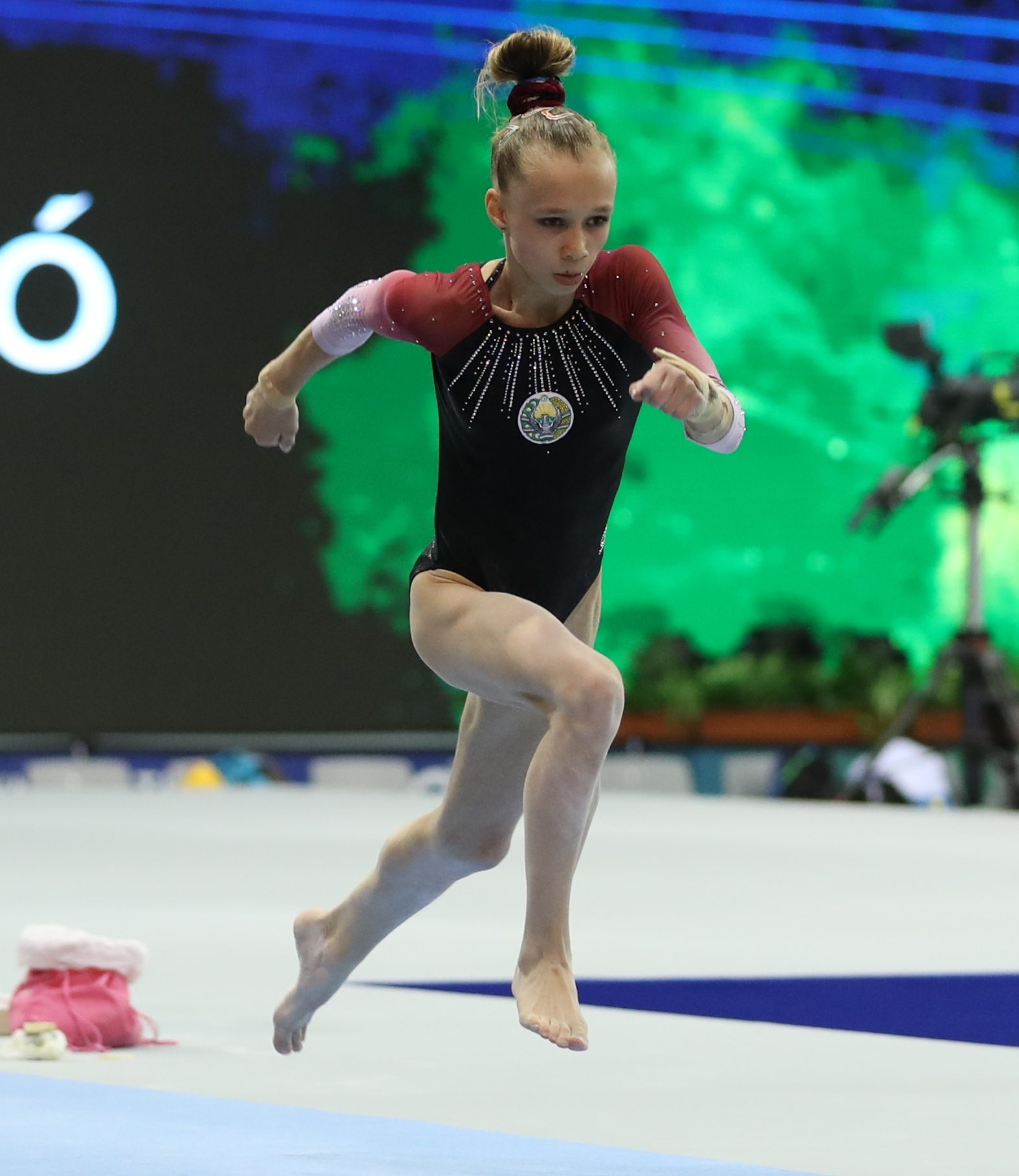
Vault

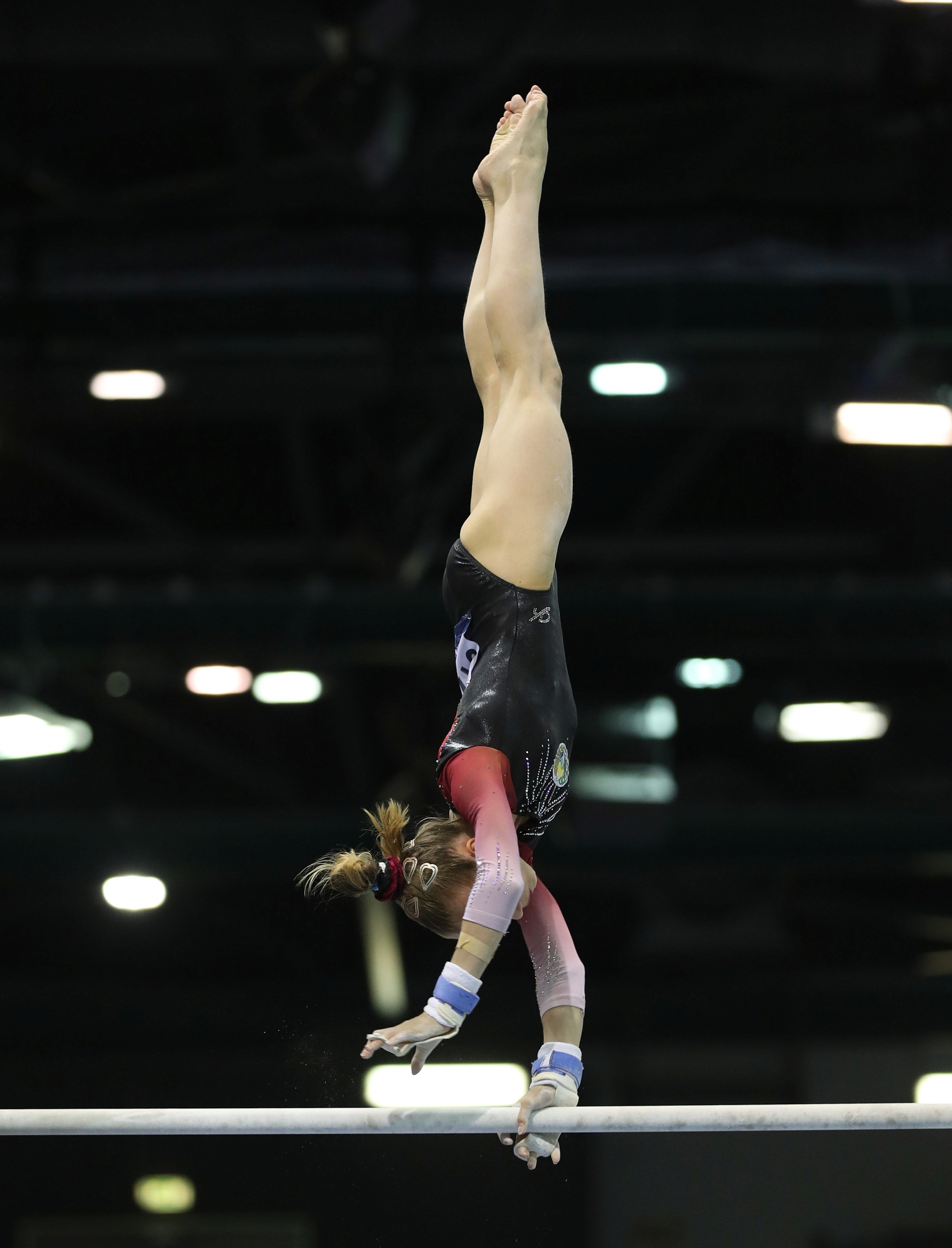
Uneven Bars

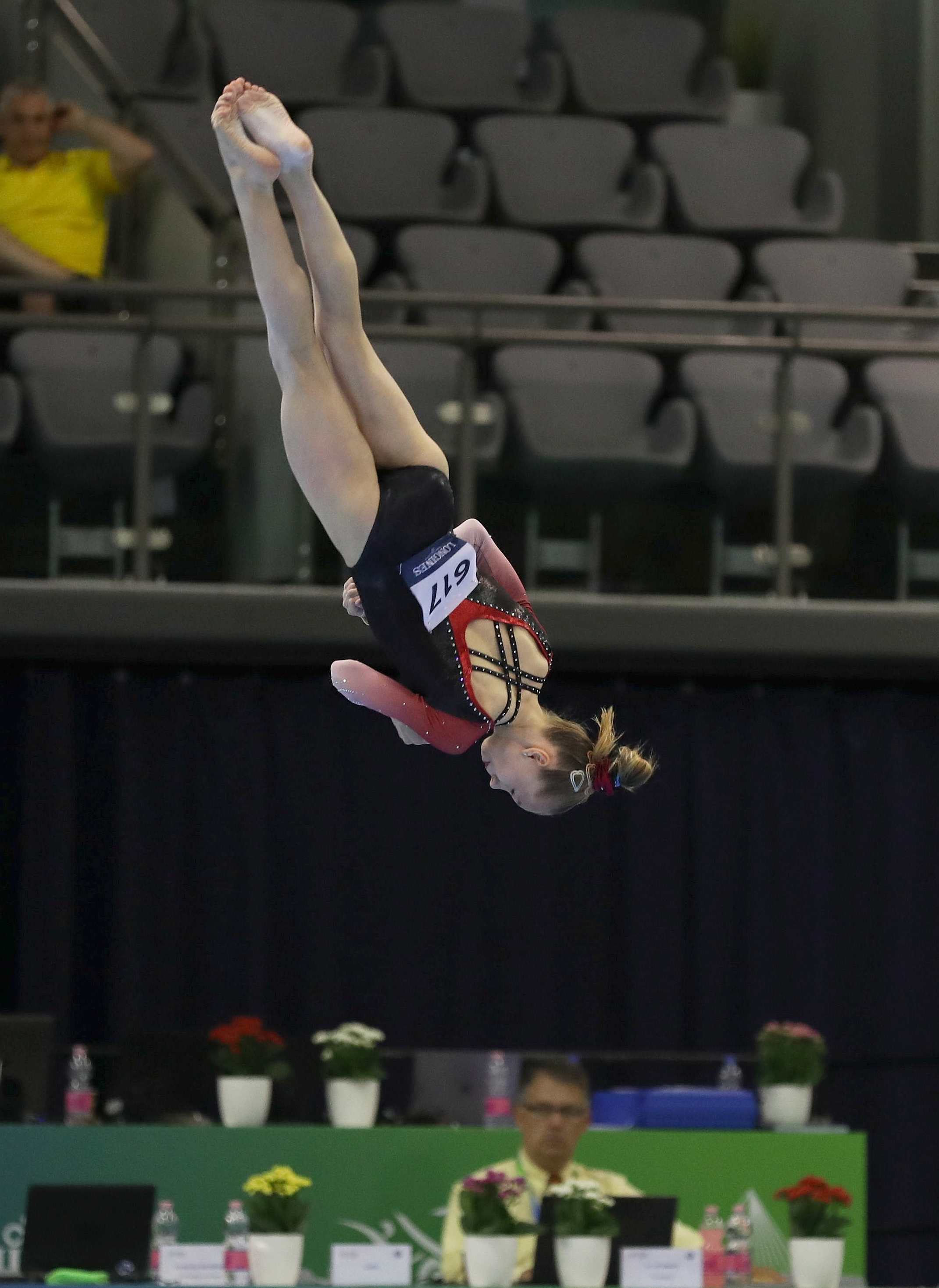
Floor Exercise

Miroshnichenko at the 2019 Junior World Championships

=== 2020–2022: Senior ===
Miroshnichenko turned senior in 2020; however the mass majority of competitions were either canceled or postponed due to the global COVID-19 pandemic. She made her senior international debut at the 2021 Varna World Challenge Cup where she finished fourth on vault behind Coline Devillard, Uliana Perebinosova, and compatriot Oksana Chusovitina. In October, Miroshnichenko competed at the 2021 South Central Asian Championships alongside Dildora Aripova, Giunaz Jumabekova, and Ominakhon Khalilova. They finished first as a team and individually Miroshnichenko won the all-around title. She also qualified to three event finals. During event finals Miroshnichenko won gold on vault and floor exercise and won silver on uneven bars behind Aripova.

In January 2022, Miroshnichenko injured her cervical vertebrae while training. In May of that year, she was awarded Master of Sports of International Class. Miroshnichenko spent the next three years rehabilitating and relearning how to walk.

== Post-gymnastics career ==
Miroshnichenko graduated from the Uzbek State Institute of Physical Culture in 2024. After rehabilitation, she returned to gymnastics as a coach. Additionally she became an International Brevet Judge, allowing her to judge at official World Gymnastics sanctioned events; her first competition she judged at was the 2026 Tashkent World Challenge Cup.

== Competitive history ==
Competitive history of Anastasiya Miroshnichenko
Year	Event	Team	AA	VT	UB	BB	FX
2017	Republican Open Competitions		1st place, gold medalist(s)	1st place, gold medalist(s)	3rd place, bronze medalist(s)		3rd place, bronze medalist(s)
2017	Junior Asian Championships	4	10	7	5		5
2017	Voronin Cup		3rd place, bronze medalist(s)	4	4	7	6
2018	President's Cup		1st place, gold medalist(s)	1st place, gold medalist(s)	2nd place, silver medalist(s)	1st place, gold medalist(s)	5
2018	Junior Asian Championships	4	7	4	4	8	
2019
2019	Junior World Championships	17	33				
2021	Varna World Challenge Cup			4			
2021	South Central Asian Championships	1st place, gold medalist(s)	1st place, gold medalist(s)	1st place, gold medalist(s)	2nd place, silver medalist(s)		1st place, gold medalist(s)
