= Ominakhon Khalilova =

Uzbek artistic gymnast

Ominakhon Khalilova Оминахон Халилова
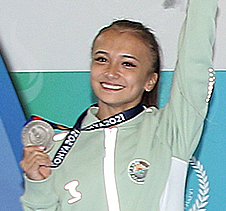
- Khalilova at the Islamic Solidarity Games in 2022

Personal information
- Full name: Ominakhon Khalilova
- Nickname: Omina
- Born: 15 December 1998 (age 27) Andijan, Uzbekistan

Gymnastics career
- Discipline: Women's artistic gymnastics
- Country represented: Uzbekistan (2016–present)
- Head coach: Ludmilla Li
Medal record
Women's artistic gymnastics
Representing Uzbekistan
Islamic Solidarity Games
Silver medal – second place	2021 Konya	Team
Silver medal – second place	2021 Konya	Floor Exercise
South Central Asian Championships
Gold medal – first place	2021 Dhaka	Team
Silver medal – second place	2021 Dhaka	All-Around
Silver medal – second place	2021 Dhaka	Balance Beam
Silver medal – second place	2021 Dhaka	Floor Exercise

Ominakhon Zafarzhon kizi Mirzayeva (née Khalilova Russian: Оминахон Зафаржон кизи Мирзаева née Халилова, born 15 December 1998) is an Uzbek artistic gymnast. She represented Uzbekistan at the 2019 and 2022 World Championships.

== Early life ==
Khalilova was born in Andijan, Uzbekistan. She began training in gymnastics in 2004 and joined the national team of Uzbekistan in 2016.

== Gymnastics career ==
=== 2014–17 ===
Khalilova competed at the Voronin Cup in 2014, 2015, and 2016. She was added to Uzbekistan's national team in 2016.

In 2017 Khalilova competed at the Baku World Cup but did not qualify for any event finals. She next competed at the 2017 Asian Gymnastics Championships where she placed 24th in the all-around.

=== 2019 ===
Khalilova began the season competing at the Baku and Doha World Cups and the Zhaoqing Challenge Cup. In Zhaoqing, she qualified to the balance beam final and finished fifth.

Khalilova was selected to represent Uzbekistan at the Asian Championships alongside Muattarkhon Abdurakhmonova, Diana Bakhtiyarova, and Indira Ulmasova. They finished seventh as a team. Khalilova next competed at the 2019 World Championships. During qualifications she finished 148th; she was the second highest scoring Uzbek gymnast after Oksana Chusovitina.

=== 2021 ===
Khalilova competed at the Varna Challenge Cup but did not qualify for any finals. In October she competed at the South Central Asian Championships alongside Anastasiya Miroshnichenko, Giunaz Jumabekova, and Dildora Aripova. They finished first as a team and individually Khalilova won silver in the all-around behind Miroshnichenko. Additionally she qualified to two event finals. During event finals Khalilova won silver on the balance beam behind Aripova and silver on floor exercise once again behind Miroshnichenko.

=== 2022 ===
At the Asian Championships Khalilova placed fourteenth in the all-around and qualified as an individual to compete at the 2022 World Championships. In August Khalilova competed at the Islamic Solidarity Games alongside Oksana Chusovitina and Dildora Aripova. They finished second as a team behind Turkey. Individually Khalilova won silver on floor exercise behind Aida Bauyrzhanova.

== Competitive history ==
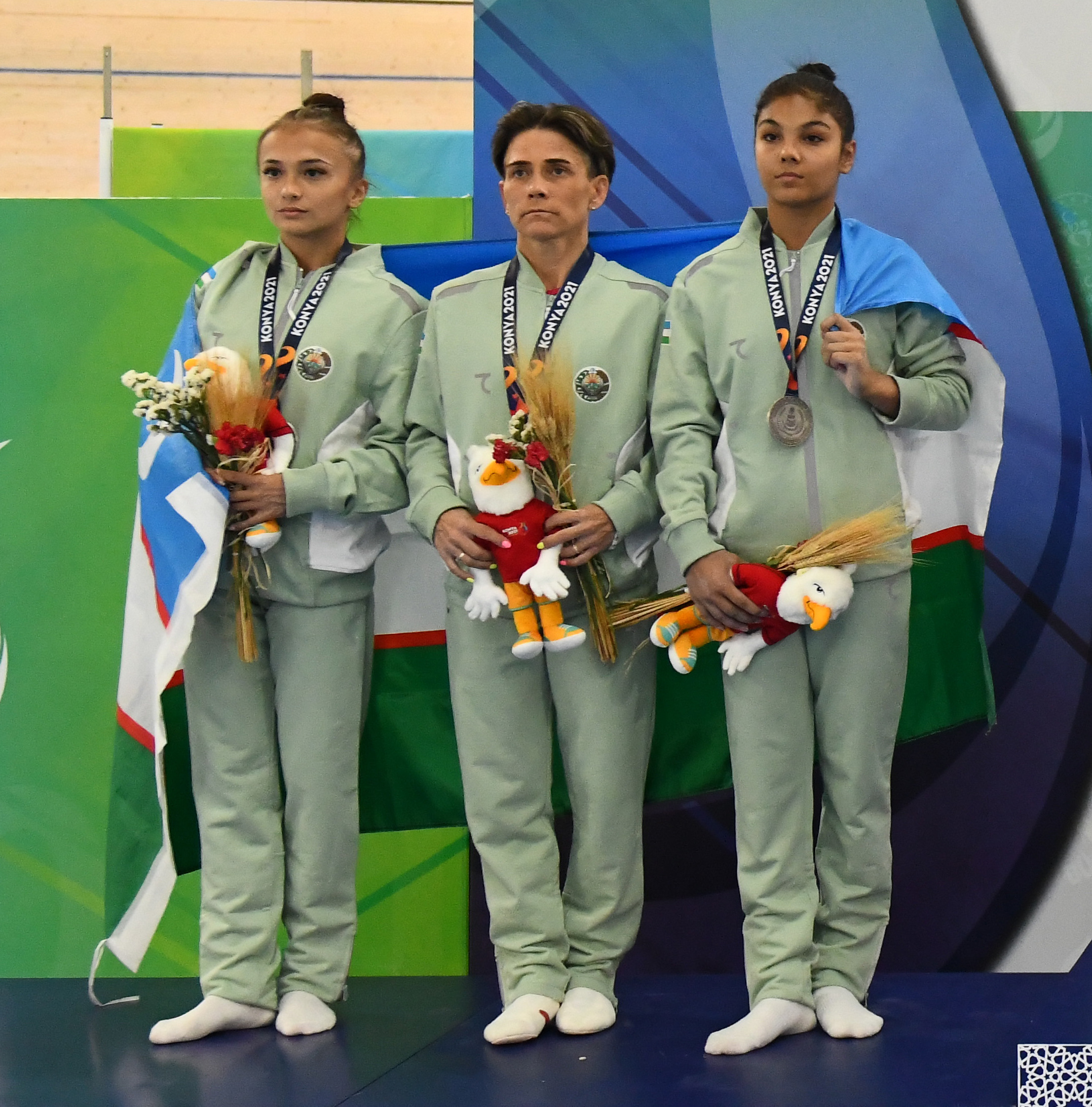
Khalilova (left) and team Uzbekistan at the 2021 Islamic Solidarity Games

Year	Event	Team	AA	VT	UB	BB	FX
2014	Voronin Cup		13			7	4
2015	Voronin Cup		12	4			5
2016	Voronin Cup		10				
2017
2017	Asian Championships		24				
2019	Zhaoqing Challenge Cup					5	
2019	Asian Championships	7					
2019	World Championships		148				
2021	South Central Asian Championships	1st place, gold medalist(s)	2nd place, silver medalist(s)			2nd place, silver medalist(s)	2nd place, silver medalist(s)
2022	Cairo World Cup						5
2022	Asian Championships	6	14				
2022	Islamic Solidarity Games	2nd place, silver medalist(s)	6		7	6	2nd place, silver medalist(s)
2022	World Championships		88				
