= 2021 in artistic gymnastics =

Below is a list of notable men's and women's artistic gymnastics international events held in 2021, as well as the medalists.

== Retirements ==
Gymnasts who announced retirements in 2021
Gymnast	Country	Date	Ref
Nile Wilson	Great Britain	January 14, 2021	
Krisztián Berki	Hungary	February 4, 2021	
Daria Spiridonova	Russia	February 17, 2021	
Leah Grießer	Germany	May 9, 2021	
Aliya Mustafina	Russia	June 8, 2021	
Kenzo Shirai	Japan	June 16, 2021	
Zoé Allaire-Bourgie	Canada	June 19, 2021	
Epke Zonderland	Netherlands	June 24, 2021	
MyKayla Skinner	United States	August 1, 2021	
Sam Mikulak	United States	August 9, 2021	
Maria Holbură	Romania	August 10, 2021	
Naoto Hayasaka	Japan	September 24, 2021	
Giulia Steingruber	Switzerland	October 1, 2021	
Deng Shudi	China	October 2, 2021	
Mai Murakami	Japan	October 24, 2021	
Ümit Şamiloğlu	Turkey	November 19, 2021	
Victoria-Kayen Woo	Canada	November 24, 2021	
Alexander Shatilov	Israel	December 2, 2021	
Shogo Nonomura	Japan	December 12, 2021	
Larisa Iordache	Romania	December 16, 2021	

== Calendar of events ==
Date	Location	Event	Men's winners	Women's winners
April 21–25	(Switzerland) Basel	European Championships	AA: (Russia) Nikita Nagornyy; FX: (Russia) Nikita Nagornyy; PH: (Armenia) Artur Davtyan; SR: (Greece) Eleftherios Petrounias; VT: (Ukraine) Igor Radivilov; PB: (Turkey) Ferhat Arıcan; HB: (Russia) David Belyavskiy	AA: (Russia) Viktoria Listunova; VT: (Switzerland) Giulia Steingruber; UB: (Russia) Angelina Melnikova; BB: (France) Mélanie de Jesus dos Santos; FX: (United Kingdom) Jessica Gadirova
May 21	(Australia) Gold Coast	Oceania Championships	AA: (New Zealand) Mikhail Koudinov	AA: (Australia) Emily Whitehead
May 22–27	(Egypt) Cairo	African Championships	AA: (Egypt) Omar Mohamed	AA: (Egypt) Zeina Ibrahim
May 27–30	(Bulgaria) Varna	FIG World Challenge Cup	FX: (Croatia) Aurel Benović; PH: (Ukraine) Illia Kovtun; SR: (Austria) Vinzenz Höck; VT: (Ukraine) Nazar Chepurnyi; PB: (Ukraine) Illia Kovtun; HB: (Croatia) Tin Srbić	VT: (France) Coline Devillard; UB: (Russia) Uliana Perebinosova; BB: (Ukraine) Anastasia Bachynska; FX: (Uzbekistan) Dildora Aripova & (Hungary) Hanna Szujó
June 3–6	(Egypt) Cairo	FIG World Challenge Cup	FX: (Ukraine) Illia Kovtun; PH: (Ukraine) Illia Kovtun; SR: (Egypt) Ali Zahran; VT: (Ukraine) Nazar Chepurnyi; PB: (Lithuania) Robert Tvorogal; HB: (Ukraine) Illia Kovtun	VT: (Egypt) Nancy Taman; UB: (Ukraine) Diana Varinska; BB: (Romania) Larisa Iordache; FX: (Hungary) Zója Székely
June 4–6	(Brazil) Rio de Janeiro	Pan American Championships	TF: Brazil; AA: (Brazil) Caio Souza; FX: (Ecuador) Israel Chiriboga; PH: (Argentina) Santiago Mayol; SR: (Brazil) Caio Souza; VT: (Brazil) Caio Souza; PB: (Brazil) Caio Souza; HB: (Colombia) Javier Sandoval	TF: Brazil; AA: (Brazil) Rebeca Andrade; VT: (Mexico) Natalia Escalera; UB: (Brazil) Lorrane Oliveira; BB: (Costa Rica) Luciana Alvarado; FX: (Brazil) Ana Luiza Lima
June 10–13	(Croatia) Osijek	FIG World Challenge Cup	FX: (Kazakhstan) Milad Karimi; PH: (Albania) Matvei Petrov; SR: (Italy) Salvatore Maresca; VT: (Ukraine) Igor Radivilov; PB: (Turkey) Ferhat Arıcan; HB: (Croatia) Tin Srbić	VT: (Hungary) Csenge Bácskay; UB: (Belgium) Nina Derwael; BB: (Belgium) Nina Derwael; FX: (Croatia) Ana Đerek
June 18–20	(Mexico) Guadalajara	Junior Pan American Championships	TF: United States; AA: (United States) Fred Richard; FX: (Brazil) Yuri Guimarães; PH: (Colombia) Ángel Barajas; SR: (Dominican Republic) Jabiel Polanco; VT: (United States) Fred Richard; PB: (United States) Ian Lasic-Ellis; HB: (United States) Fred Richard	TF: United States; AA: (United States) Katelyn Jong; VT: (United States) Katelyn Jong & (United States) Kaliya Lincoln; UB: (United States) Katelyn Jong; BB: (United States) Madray Johnson; FX: (United States) Kaliya Lincoln
~~March 10–13~~; June 23–26	(Qatar) Doha	FIG World Cup	FX: (Israel) Artem Dolgopyat; PH: (Iran) Saeid Reza Keikha; SR: (Greece) Eleftherios Petrounias; VT: (Japan) Hidenobu Yonekura; PB: (Turkey) Ferhat Arıcan; HB: (Cyprus) Marios Georgiou	VT: (Uzbekistan) Oksana Chusovitina; UB: (Brazil) Rebeca Andrade; BB: (Ukraine) Diana Varinska; FX: (Italy) Vanessa Ferrari
July 23–August 8	(Japan) Tokyo	Olympic Games	TF: ROC; AA: (Japan) Daiki Hashimoto; FX: (Israel) Artem Dolgopyat; PH: (United Kingdom) Max Whitlock; SR: (China) Liu Yang; VT: (South Korea) Shin Jae-hwan; PB: (China) Zou Jingyuan; HB: (Japan) Daiki Hashimoto	TF: ROC; AA: (United States) Sunisa Lee; VT: (Brazil) Rebeca Andrade; UB: (Belgium) Nina Derwael; BB: (China) Guan Chenchen; FX: (United States) Jade Carey
September 2–5	(Slovenia) Koper	FIG World Challenge Cup	FX: (Russia) Kirill Prokopev; PH: (Albania) Matvei Petrov; SR: (Austria) Vinzenz Höck; VT: (Israel) Andrey Medvedev; PB: (Turkey) Sercan Demir; HB: (Belgium) Maxime Gentges	VT: (Slovenia) Tjaša Kysselef; UB: (Slovakia) Barbora Mokošová; BB: (Canada) Cassandra Lee; FX: (United Kingdom) Claudia Fragapane
September 9–12	(Turkey) Mersin	FIG World Challenge Cup	FX: (Canada) Félix Dolci; PH: (Jordan) Ahmad Abu al Soud; SR: (Russia) Grigorii Klimentev; VT: (Canada) William Emard; PB: (Ukraine) Illia Kovtun; HB: (Hungary) Dávid Vecsernyés	VT: (Hungary) Csenge Bácskay; UB: (Hungary) Zója Székely; BB: (Romania) Maria Ceplinschi; FX: (Romania) Maria Ceplinschi
October 18–24	(Japan) Kitakyushu	World Championships	AA: (China) Zhang Boheng; FX: (Italy) Nicola Bartolini; PH: (United States) Stephen Nedoroscik; SR: (China) Lan Xingyu; VT: (Philippines) Carlos Yulo; PB: (China) Hu Xuwei; HB: (China) Hu Xuwei	AA: Angelina Melnikova; VT: (Brazil) Rebeca Andrade; UB: (China) Wei Xiaoyuan; BB: (Japan) Urara Ashikawa; FX: (Japan) Mai Murakami
November 9–15	(Bolivia) Cochabamba	Junior South American Championships	TF: Chile; AA: (Chile) Luciano Letelier	TF: Argentina; AA: (Argentina) Isabella Ajalla
October 27–31	(Bangladesh) Dhaka	South Central Asian Championships	TF: Uzbekistan; AA: (Uzbekistan) Utkirbek Juraev; FX: (Uzbekistan) Abdulaziz Mirvaliev; PH: (India) Debang Dey; SR: (India) Omkar Shinde; VT: (Uzbekistan) Abdulaziz Mirvaliev; PB: (India) Omkar Shinde; HB: (Uzbekistan) Utkirbek Juraev	TF: Uzbekistan; AA: (Uzbekistan) Anastasiya Miroshnichenko; VT: (Uzbekistan) Anastasiya Miroshnichenko; UB: (Uzbekistan) Dildora Aripova; BB: (Uzbekistan) Dildora Aripova; FX: (Uzbekistan) Anastasiya Miroshnichenko
November 12–14	(Wales) Cardiff	Northern European Championships	TF: Wales; AA: (Wales) Joe Cemlyn-Jones; FX: (Wales) Joe Cemlyn-Jones; PH: (Wales) Joe Cemlyn-Jones; SR: (Republic of Ireland) Daniel Fox; VT: (Republic of Ireland) Ewan Mcateer; PB: (Wales) Brinn Bevan; HB: (Norway) Sofus Heggemsnes	TF: England; AA: (Scotland) Emily Bremner; VT: (Denmark) Sara Jacobsen; UB: (Finland) Iida Haapala; BB: (England) Megan Bridge; FX: (Isle of Man) Tara Donnelly
November 25–December 5	(Colombia) Cali	Junior Pan American Games	TF: United States; AA: (United States) Vahe Petrosyan; FX: (United States) Tobias Liang; PH: (United States) David Shamah; SR: (Dominican Republic) Jabiel Polanco; VT: (Mexico) Ricardo Torres; PB: (United States) David Shamah; HB: (Brazil) Diogo Paes	TF: United States; AA: (United States) Katelyn Jong; VT: (United States) Tiana Sumanasekera; UB: (United States) Madray Johnson; BB: (United States) Madray Johnson; FX: (United States) Kailin Chio
December 8–13	(Argentina) San Juan	South American Championships	TF: Brazil; AA: (Brazil) Gabriel Faria; FX: (Argentina) Santiago Mayol; PH: (Brazil) Gabriel Faria; SR: (Argentina) Daniel Villafañe; VT: (Brazil) Josué Heliodoro; PB: (Argentina) Julian Jato; HB: (Brazil) Patrick Sampaio	TF: Brazil; AA: (Brazil) Júlia Soares; VT: (Chile) Franchesca Santi; UB: (Argentina) Brisa Carraro; BB: (Brazil) Júlia Soares; FX: (Brazil) Júlia Soares

=== Canceled events ===
Due to the COVID-19 pandemic, several events were canceled.

Scheduled Date	Location	Event	Ref
February 25–28	(Germany) Cottbus	FIG World Cup	
March 4–7	(Azerbaijan) Baku	FIG World Cup	
March 20–21	(Germany) Stuttgart	FIG All-Around World Cup	
March 27	(United Kingdom) Birmingham	FIG All-Around World Cup	
May 4	(Japan) Tokyo	FIG All-Around World Cup	
May 29–June 1	(China) Hangzhou	Asian Championships	

== Medalists ==
=== Women ===
==== International events ====
Competition	Event	Gold	Silver	Bronze
Olympics	Team	ROC; Lilia Akhaimova; Viktoria Listunova; Angelina Melnikova; Vladislava Urazova	United States; Simone Biles; Jordan Chiles; Sunisa Lee; Grace McCallum	Great Britain; Jennifer Gadirova; Jessica Gadirova; Alice Kinsella; Amelie Morgan
Olympics	All-Around	(United States) Sunisa Lee	(Brazil) Rebeca Andrade	(Russia) Angelina Melnikova
Olympics	Vault	(Brazil) Rebeca Andrade	(United States) MyKayla Skinner	(South Korea) Yeo Seo-jeong
Olympics	Uneven Bars	(Belgium) Nina Derwael	(Russia) Anastasia Ilyankova	(United States) Sunisa Lee
Olympics	Balance Beam	(China) Guan Chenchen	(China) Tang Xijing	(United States) Simone Biles
Olympics	Floor Exercise	(United States) Jade Carey	(Italy) Vanessa Ferrari	(Japan) Mai Murakami (Russia) Angelina Melnikova
World Championships	All-Around	Angelina Melnikova	(United States) Leanne Wong	(United States) Kayla DiCello
World Championships	Vault	(Brazil) Rebeca Andrade	(Italy) Asia D'Amato	Angelina Melnikova
World Championships	Uneven Bars	(China) Wei Xiaoyuan	(Brazil) Rebeca Andrade	(China) Luo Rui
World Championships	Balance Beam	(Japan) Urara Ashikawa	(Germany) Pauline Schaefer-Betz	(Japan) Mai Murakami
World Championships	Floor Exercise	(Japan) Mai Murakami	Angelina Melnikova	(United States) Leanne Wong

==== Regional championships ====
Competition	Event	Gold	Silver	Bronze
African	All-Around	(Egypt) Zeina Ibrahim	(Egypt) Farah Hussein	(South Africa) Naveen Daries
European	All-Around	(Russia) Viktoria Listunova	(Russia) Angelina Melnikova	(United Kingdom) Jessica Gadirova
European	Vault	(Switzerland) Giulia Steingruber	(United Kingdom) Jessica Gadirova	(Russia) Angelina Melnikova
European	Uneven Bars	(Russia) Angelina Melnikova	(Russia) Vladislava Urazova	(United Kingdom) Amelie Morgan
European	Balance Beam	(France) Mélanie de Jesus dos Santos	(Netherlands) Sanne Wevers	(Ukraine) Anastasia Bachynska
European	Floor Exercise	(United Kingdom) Jessica Gadirova	(Russia) Angelina Melnikova	(Italy) Vanessa Ferrari
Oceania	All-Around	(Australia) Emily Whitehead	(Australia) Georgia-Rose Brown	(Australia) Brianna Scott
Pan American	Team	Brazil	Mexico	Argentina
Pan American	All-Around	(Brazil) Rebeca Andrade	(Costa Rica) Luciana Alvarado	(Brazil) Lorrane Oliveira
Pan American	Vault	(Mexico) Natalia Escalera	(Panama) Hillary Heron	(Ecuador) Alaís Perea
Pan American	Uneven Bars	(Brazil) Lorrane Oliveira	(Brazil) Christal Bezerra	(Mexico) Daniela Briceño
Pan American	Balance Beam	(Costa Rica) Luciana Alvarado	(Mexico) Paulina Campos	(Brazil) Júlia Soares
Pan American	Floor Exercise	(Brazil) Ana Luiza Lima	(Brazil) Christal Bezerra	(Argentina) Abigail Magistrati

=== Men ===
==== International events ====
Competition	Event	Gold	Silver	Bronze
Olympics	Team	ROC; Denis Ablyazin; David Belyavskiy; Artur Dalaloyan; Nikita Nagornyy	Japan; Daiki Hashimoto; Kazuma Kaya; Takeru Kitazono; Wataru Tanigawa	China; Lin Chaopan; Sun Wei; Xiao Ruoteng; Zou Jingyuan
Olympics	All-Around	(Japan) Daiki Hashimoto	(China) Xiao Ruoteng	(Russia) Nikita Nagornyy
Olympics	Floor Exercise	(Israel) Artem Dolgopyat	(Spain) Rayderley Zapata	(China) Xiao Ruoteng
Olympics	Pommel Horse	(United Kingdom) Max Whitlock	(Chinese Taipei) Lee Chih-kai	(Japan) Kazuma Kaya
Olympics	Rings	(China) Liu Yang	(China) You Hao	(Greece) Eleftherios Petrounias
Olympics	Vault	(South Korea) Shin Jae-hwan	(Russia) Denis Ablyazin	(Armenia) Artur Davtyan
Olympics	Parallel Bars	(China) Zou Jingyuan	(Germany) Lukas Dauser	(Turkey) Ferhat Arıcan
Olympics	Horizontal Bar	(Japan) Daiki Hashimoto	(Croatia) Tin Srbić	(Russia) Nikita Nagornyy
World Championships	All-Around	(China) Zhang Boheng	(Japan) Daiki Hashimoto	(Ukraine) Illia Kovtun
World Championships	Floor Exercise	(Italy) Nicola Bartolini	(Japan) Kazuki Minami	(Finland) Emil Soravuo
World Championships	Pommel Horse	(United States) Stephen Nedoroscik	(China) Weng Hao (Japan) Kazuma Kaya	none awarded
World Championships	Rings	(China) Lan Xingyu	(Italy) Marco Lodadio	(Italy) Salvatore Maresca Grigorii Klimentev
World Championships	Vault	(Philippines) Carlos Yulo	(Japan) Hidenobu Yonekura	(Israel) Andrey Medvedev
World Championships	Parallel Bars	(China) Hu Xuwei	(Philippines) Carlos Yulo	(China) Shi Cong
World Championships	Horizontal Bar	(China) Hu Xuwei	(Japan) Daiki Hashimoto	(United States) Brody Malone

==== Regional championships ====
Competition	Event	Gold	Silver	Bronze
African	All-Around	(Egypt) Omar Mohamed	(Egypt) Ziad Khater	(Nigeria) Uche Eke
European	All-Around	(Russia) Nikita Nagornyy	(Russia) David Belyavskiy	(Ukraine) Illia Kovtun
European	Floor Exercise	(Russia) Nikita Nagornyy	(Switzerland) Benjamin Gischard	(Italy) Nicola Bartolini
European	Pommel Horse	(Armenia) Artur Davtyan	(Russia) Nikita Nagornyy	(United Kingdom) Joe Fraser
European	Rings	(Greece) Eleftherios Petrounias	(Russia) Nikita Nagornyy	(Italy) Salvatore Maresca
European	Vault	(Ukraine) Igor Radivilov	(Israel) Andrey Medvedev	(United Kingdom) Giarnni Regini-Moran
European	Parallel Bars	(Turkey) Ferhat Arıcan	(Russia) David Belyavskiy	(Switzerland) Christian Baumann (Germany) Lukas Dauser
European	Horizontal Bar	(Russia) David Belyavskiy	(Germany) Andreas Toba	(Turkey) Adem Asil
Oceania	All-Around	(New Zealand) Mikhail Koudinov	(Australia) Mitchell Morgans	(Australia) Jesse Moore
Pan American	Team	Brazil	United States	Colombia
Pan American	All-Around	(Brazil) Caio Souza	(United States) Paul Juda	(Brazil) Diogo Soares
Pan American	Floor Exercise	(Ecuador) Israel Chiriboga	(Brazil) Tomás Florêncio	(Argentina) Julian Jato
Pan American	Pommel Horse	(Argentina) Santiago Mayol	(Colombia) Javier Sandoval	(Brazil) Francisco Barretto
Pan American	Rings	(Brazil) Caio Souza	(Argentina) Federico Molinari	(Colombia) Kristopher Bohórquez
Pan American	Vault	(Brazil) Caio Souza	(Mexico) Fabián de Luna	(Argentina) Daniel Villafañe
Pan American	Parallel Bars	(Brazil) Caio Souza	(Colombia) Javier Sandoval	(Brazil) Diogo Soares
Pan American	Horizontal Bar	(Colombia) Javier Sandoval	(Colombia) José Manuel Martínez	(Argentina) Santiago Mayol

== Season's best scores ==
=== Women ===
Note: Only the scores of senior gymnasts from international events have been included below. Only one score per gymnast is included.

==== All-around ====
Rank	Name	Country	Score	Event
1	Simone Biles	United States	57.731	Olympic Games QF
2	Sunisa Lee	United States	57.433	Olympic Games AA
3	Rebeca Andrade	Brazil	57.399	Olympic Games QF
4	Angelina Melnikova	Russia	57.199	Olympic Games AA
5	Vladislava Urazova	Russia	57.099	Olympic Games QF
6	Viktoria Listunova	Russia	56.932	Olympic Games QF
7	Nina Derwael	Belgium	56.598	Olympic Games QF
8	Tang Xijing	China	56.432	Olympic Games QF
9	Leanne Wong	United States	56.340	World Championships AA
10	Jade Carey	United States	56.265	Olympic Games QF
11	Mai Murakami	Japan	56.032	Olympic Games AA
12	Mélanie de Jesus dos Santos	France	55.966	Olympic Games TF
13	Kayla DiCello	United States	55.700	World Championships QF
14	MyKayla Skinner	United States	55.398	Olympic Games QF
15	Jessica Gadirova	Great Britain	55.199	Olympic Games QF
16	Grace McCallum	United States	55.166	Olympic Games TF
17	Lu Yufei	China	55.066	Olympic Games QF
18	Zhang Jin	China	54.932	Olympic Games QF
19	Zsófia Kovács	Hungary	54.732	Olympic Games QF
20	Jennifer Gadirova	Great Britain	54.699	Olympic Games QF

==== Vault ====
Rank	Name	Country	Score	Event
1	Simone Biles	United States	15.183	Olympic Games QF
2	Jade Carey	United States	15.166	Olympic Games QF
3	Rebeca Andrade	Brazil	15.100	Olympic Games QF
4	MyKayla Skinner	United States	14.916	Olympic Games EF
5	Giulia Steingruber	Switzerland	14.823	European Championships EF
6	Yeo Seo-jeong	South Korea	14.800	Olympic Games QF
7	Alexa Moreno	Mexico	14.716	Olympic Games QF
8	Shallon Olsen	Canada	14.699	Olympic Games QF
9	Lilia Akhaimova	Russia	14.699	Olympic Games QF
10	Angelina Melnikova	Russia	14.683	Olympic Games EF

==== Uneven bars ====
Rank	Name	Country	Score	Event
1	Nina Derwael	Belgium	15.400	Olympic Games TF
1	Sunisa Lee	United States	15.400	Olympic Games TF
3	Rebeca Andrade	Brazil	15.100	World Championships QF
4	Anastasia Ilyankova	Russia	14.966	Olympic Games QF
5	Angelina Melnikova	Russia	14.933	Olympic Games QF
6	Viktoria Listunova	Russia	14.900	Olympic Games TF
7	Vladislava Urazova	Russia	14.866	Olympic Games QF
8	Wei Xiaoyuan	China	14.733	World Championships QF
9	Lu Yufei	China	14.700	Olympic Games QF
9	Elisabeth Seitz	Germany	14.700	Olympic Games QF

==== Balance beam ====
Rank	Name	Country	Score	Event
1	Guan Chenchen	China	14.933	Olympic Games QF
2	Luo Rui	China	14.566	World Championships QF
3	Viktoria Listunova	Russia	14.333	Olympic Games TF
3	Tang Xijing	China	14.333	Olympic Games QF
5	Sunisa Lee	United States	14.200	Olympic Games QF
5	Vladislava Urazova	Russia	14.200	Olympic Games AA
7	Giorgia Villa	Italy	14.150	Flanders International Team Challenge
8	Larisa Iordache	Romania	14.133	Olympic Games QF
9	Urara Ashikawa	Japan	14.100	World Championships EF
9	Ellie Black	Canada	14.100	Olympic Games QF
9	Lu Yufei	China	14.100	Olympic Games QF

==== Floor exercise ====
Rank	Name	Country	Score	Event
1	Jade Carey	United States	14.366	Olympic Games EF
2	Angelina Melnikova	Russia	14.300	European Championships QF
3	Vanessa Ferrari	Italy	14.266	Doha World Cup EF
4	Viktoria Listunova	Russia	14.166	Olympic Games TF
4	Mai Murakami	Japan	14.166	Olympic Games EF
6	Simone Biles	United States	14.133	Olympic Games QF
7	Rebeca Andrade	Brazil	14.066	Olympic Games QF
8	Jessica Gadirova	Great Britain	14.066	Olympic Games QF
8	Leanne Wong	United States	14.066	World Championships AA
10	Kayla DiCello	United States	13.800	World Championships QF
10	Jennifer Gadirova	Great Britain	13.800	Olympic Games QF

=== Men ===
==== All around ====
International & domestic (Note: Japan, China, and Russia only) competitions
Rank	Name	Country	Score	Event
1	Zhang Boheng	China	88.565	Chinese Olympic Trials
2	Daiki Hashimoto	Japan	88.532	All Japan Championships AA
3	Sun Wei	China	88.430	Chinese Olympic Trials
4	Nikita Nagornyy	Russia	88.330	Olympic TF
5	Xiao Ruoteng	China	88.065	Olympic AA
6	Deng Shudi	China	87.631	Chinese Olympic Trials
7	Takeru Kitazono	Japan	87.332	All Japan Championships QF
8	Wataru Tanigawa	Japan	87.231	All Japan Championships AA
9	Lin Chaopan	China	86.698	Chinese Championships AA
9	Kazuma Kaya	Japan	86.698	NHK Trophy
11	Teppei Miwa	Japan	86.598	All Japan Championships QF
12	Joe Fraser	Great Britain	86.298	Olympic QF
13	Shi Cong	China	86.265	Chinese National Games TF
14	Artur Dalaloyan	Russia	86.248	Olympic AA
15	David Belyavskiy	Russia	85.864	European Championships AA
16	Zou Jingyuan	China	85.798	Chinese Championships AA
17	Kazuyuki Takeda	Japan	85.764	NHK Trophy
18	Ahmet Önder	Turkey	85.665	Olympic QF
19	Takaaki Sugino	Japan	85.531	NHK Trophy
20	Shohei Kawakami	Japan	85.500	All Japan Junior Championships

International competitions only
Rank	Name	Country	Score	Event
1	Daiki Hashimoto	Japan	88.531	Olympic Games QF
2	Nikita Nagornyy	Russia	88.330	Olympic TF
3	Xiao Ruoteng	China	88.065	Olympic AA
4	Zhang Boheng	China	87.981	World Championships AA
5	Sun Wei	China	87.798	Olympic AA
7	Takeru Kitazono	Japan	86.698	Olympic AA
8	Joe Fraser	Great Britain	86.298	Olympic QF
9	Artur Dalaloyan	Russia	86.248	Olympic AA
10	David Belyavskiy	Russia	85.864	European Championships AA
11	Ahmet Onder	Turkey	85.665	Olympic QF
12	Kazuma Kaya	Japan	85.465	Olympic Games QF
13	Brody Malone	United States	85.298	Olympic Games QF
14	Lin Chaopan	China	85.098	Olympic Games QF
15	Wataru Tanigawa	Japan	84.906	Olympic Games QF
16	Illia Kovtun	Ukraine	84.864	European Championships AA
17	Tang Chia-hung	Chinese Taipei	84.798	Olympic AA
18	Aleksandr Kartsev	Russia	84.731	European Championships QF
19	Sam Mikulak	United States	84.664	Olympic Games QF
20	James Hall	Great Britain	84.598	Olympic AA

==== Floor exercise ====
International & domestic competitions
Rank	Name	Country	Score	Event
1	Kazuki Minami	Japan	15.433	All Japan Championships Tryout
2	Artem Dolgopyat	Israel	15.400	Osijek Challenge Cup QF
3	Carlos Yulo	Philippines	15.300	All Japan Championships
4	Xiao Ruoteng	China	15.200	Chinese Olympic Trials
5	Nikita Nagornyy	Russia	15.166	European Championships EF
6	Kenzo Shirai	Japan	15.133	All Japan Championships EF
7	Ryosuke Doi	Japan	15.066	All Japan Championships QF
8	Ryu Sung-hyun	South Korea	15.066	Olympic QF
9	Zhang Boheng	China	15.066	Chinese National Games QF
10	Kirill Prokopev	Russia	15.066	European Championships QF

International competitions only
Rank	Name	Country	Score	Event
1	Artem Dolgopyat	Israel	15.400	Osijek Challenge Cup QF
2	Nikita Nagornyy	Russia	15.166	European Championships EF
2	Carlos Yulo	Philippines	15.166	World Championships QF
4	Ryu Sung-hyun	South Korea	15.066	Olympic QF
4	Kirill Prokopev	Russia	15.066	European Championships QF
6	Rayderley Zapata	Spain	15.041	Olympic QF
7	Milad Karimi	Kazakhstan	15.033	Olympic AA
8	Nicola Bartolini	Italy	14.966	World Championships QF
8	Benjamin Gischard	Switzerland	14.966	European Championships EF
8	Kazuki Minami	Japan	14.966	World Championships QF

==== Pommel horse ====
International & domestic competitions
Rank	Name	Country	Score	Event
1	Yamato Ichiguchi	Japan	15.766	All Japan Championships EF
2	Weng Hao	China	15.600	World Championships QF
3	Max Whitlock	Great Britain	15.583	Olympic EF
4	Lee Chih-kai	(Chinese Taipei) Taipei	15.400	Olympic EF
5	Stephen Nedoroscik	United States	15.366	World Championships QF
6	Kakeru Tanigawa	Japan	15.333	All Japan Team Championships
7	Alec Yoder	United States	15.300	World Championships QF
8	Rhys McClenaghan	Ireland	15.266	Olympic QF
9	Kohei Kameyama	Japan	15.266	Olympic QF
10	Matvei Petrov	Albania	15.250	Osijek Challenge Cup QF

International competitions only
Rank	Name	Country	Score	Event
1	Weng Hao	China	15.600	World Championships QF
2	Max Whitlock	Great Britain	15.583	Olympic PH Final
3	Lee Chih-kai	Chinese Taipei	15.400	Olympic PH Final
4	Stephen Nedoroscik	United States	15.366	World Championships QF
5	Alec Yoder	United States	15.300	World Championships QF
6	Rhys McClenaghan	Ireland	15.266	Olympic QF
6	Kohei Kameyama	Japan	15.266	Olympic QF
8	Matvei Petrov	Albania	15.250	Osijek Challenge Cup QF
9	Saeedreza Keikha	Iran	15.200	Doha World Cup EF
10	Daiki Hashimoto	Japan	15.075	World Championships QF

==== Rings ====
International & domestic competitions
Rank	Name	Country	Score	Event
1	Liu Yang	China	15.700	Chinese Olympic Trials
2	Eleftherios Petrounias	Greece	15.500	Doha World Cup EF
3	You Hao	China	15.300	Olympic EF
4	Lan Xingyu	China	15.266	World Championships QF
5	Yuta Ueda	Japan	15.250	Japan HS Championships QF
6	Yuya Kamoto	Japan	15.166	All Japan Championships EF
7	Samir Aït Saïd	France	15.066	Olympic QF
8	Takuya Nagano	Japan	15.033	All Japan Championships Tryout
9	Denis Ablyazin	Russia	15.033	Olympic TF
10	Nikita Nagornyy	Russia	15.033	European Championships EF

International competitions only
Rank	Name	Country	Score	Event
1	Liu Yang	China	15.500	Olympic EF
1	Eleftherios Petrounias	Greece	15.500	Doha World Cup EF
3	You Hao	China	15.300	Olympic EF
4	Lan Xingyu	China	15.266	World Championships QF
5	Samir Aït Saïd	France	15.066	Olympic QF
6	Denis Ablyazin	Russia	15.033	Olympic TF
6	Nikita Nagornyy	Russia	15.033	European Championships EF
8	Vahagn Davtyan	Armenia	14.966	European Championships QF
9	İbrahim Çolak	Turkey	14.933	Olympic QF
9	Salvatore Maresca	Italy	14.933	European Championships QF

==== Single vault ====
No.	Gymnast	Nation	Score	Event
1	Wataru Tanigawa	Japan	15.533	NHK Trophy
2	Hidenobu Yonekura	Japan	15.500	All Japan Championships Tryout
3	Keisuke Asato	Japan	15.300	All Japan Championships VT QF
4	Adem Asil	Turkey	15.266	Olympic VT Final
5	Daiki Hashimoto	Japan	15.233	All Japan Championships AA QF
6	Chen Yilu	China	15.200	Chinese National Games VT Final
7	Andrey Medvedev	Israel	15.133	Doha World Cup VT Final
8	Shin Jea-hwan	South Korea	15.100	Olympic QF
9	Carlos Yulo	Philippines	15.066	All Japan Team Championships
10	Zhang Boheng	China	15.033	Chinese Championships AA QF

==== Vault ====
International & domestic competitions
Rank	Name	Country	Score	Event
1	Hidenobu Yonekura	Japan	15.266	All Japan Championships Tryout
2	Keisuke Asato	Japan	15.166	All Japan Championships QF
3	Nikita Nagornyy	Russia	14.933	Russian Cup EF
4	Huang Mingqi	China	14.916	Chinese Championships QF
5	Carlos Yulo	Philippines	14.916	World Championships EF
6	Artur Dalaloyan	Russia	14.883	Russian Championships EF
7	Shin Jea-hwan	South Korea	14.866	Olympic QF
8	Artur Davtyan	Armenia	14.866	Olympic QF
9	Mikito Endo	Japan	14.833	NHK Trophy
10	Nazar Chepurnyi	Ukraine	14.833	World Championships QF

International competitions only
Rank	Name	Country	Score	Event
1	Hidenobu Yonekura	Japan	15.016	Doha World Cup EF
2	Carlos Yulo	Philippines	14.916	World Championships EF
3	Shin Jea-hwan	South Korea	14.866	Olympic QF
3	Artur Davtyan	Armenia	14.866	Olympic QF
5	Nazar Chepurnyi	Ukraine	14.833	World Championships QF
5	Yang Hak-seon	South Korea	14.833	World Championships QF
7	Andrey Medvedev	Israel	14.800	Koper Challenge Cup EF
7	Igor Radivilov	Ukraine	14.800	Osijek Challenge Cup QF
9	Nikita Nagornyy	Russia	14.783	Olympic QF
9	Denis Ablyazin	Russia	14.783	Olympic EF

==== Parallel bars ====
International & domestic competitions
Rank	Name	Country	Score	Event
1	Zou Jingyuan	China	16.466	Chinese Olympic Trials
2	Lukas Dauser	Germany	15.733	Olympic QF
3	You Hao	China	15.666	Olympic QF
4	Ferhat Arican	Turkey	15.633	Olympic EF
5	Carlos Yulo	Philippines	15.566	World Championships QF
6	Hu Xuwei	China	15.466	World Championships EF
7	Sam Mikulak	United States	15.433	Olympic QF
8	Xiao Ruoteng	China	15.400	Olympic QF
9	Joe Fraser	Great Britain	15.400	Olympic QF
10	Nikita Nagornyy	Russia	15.400	Olympic AA

International competitions only
Rank	Name	Country	Score	Event
1	Zou Jingyuan	China	16.166	Olympic QF
2	Lukas Dauser	Germany	15.733	Olympic QF
3	You Hao	China	15.666	Olympic QF
4	Ferhat Arican	Turkey	15.633	Olympic EF
5	Carlos Yulo	Philippines	15.566	World Championships QF
6	Hu Xuwei	China	15.466	World Championships EF
7	Sam Mikulak	United States	15.433	Olympic QF
8	Xiao Ruoteng	China	15.400	Olympic QF
8	Joe Fraser	Great Britain	15.400	Olympic QF
8	Nikita Nagornyy	Russia	15.400	Olympic AA Final

==== Horizontal bar ====
International & domestic competitions
Rank	Name	Country	Score	Event
1	Kohei Uchimura	Japan	15.766	All Japan Championships QF
2	Fusuke Maeda	Japan	15.300	All Japan Championships Tryout
3	Hu Xuwei	China	15.166	World Championships EF
4	Daiki Hashimoto	Japan	15.133	All Japan Championships EF
5	Takaaki Sugino	Japan	15.000	All Japan Championships EF
6	Brody Malone	United States	14.966	World Championships EF
7	Carlo Macchini	Italy	14.966	World Championships EF
8	Tin Srbić	Croatia	14.900	Olympic EF
9	Lin Chaopan	China	14.866	Chinese Championships QF
10	Takeru Kitazono	Japan	14.866	All Japan Championships QF

International competitions only
Rank	Name	Country	Score	Event
1	Hu Xuwei	China	15.166	World Championships EF
2	Daiki Hashimoto	Japan	15.133	World Championships AA
3	Brody Malone	United States	14.966	World Championships EF
3	Carlo Macchini	Italy	14.966	World Championships EF
5	Tin Srbić	Croatia	14.900	Olympic EF
6	Milad Karimi	Kazakhstan	14.833	World Championships EF
7	Zhang Boheng	China	14.800	World Championships AA
8	Kōhei Uchimura	Japan	14.600	World Championships EF
9	Sam Mikulak	United States	14.566	Olympic TF
10	Nikita Nagornyy	Russia	14.533	Olympic EF
