= 2017 Voronin Cup =

Gymnastics championship

Mikhail Voronin Cup
- Location: Moscow, Russia
- Date: December 19–20, 2017

The 2017 Mikhail Voronin Cup took place on December 19–20 in Moscow, Russia.

== Medal winners ==
=== Senior ===
Event	Gold	Silver	Bronze
Individual all-around	Angelina Melnikova (RUS)	Viktoria Komova (RUS)	Irina Sazonova (ISL)
Vault	Oksana Chusovitina (UZB)	Angelina Melnikova (RUS)	Eleonora Afanasyeva (RUS)
Uneven Bars	Uliana Perebinosova (RUS)	Angelina Melnikova (RUS)	Irina Sazonova (ISL)
Balance Beam	Maria Kharenkova (RUS)	Viktoria Trykina (RUS)	Marina Nekrasova (AZE)
Floor Exercise	Maria Kharenkova (RUS)	Marina Nekrasova (AZE)	Rifda Irfanaluthfi (IDN)

=== Junior ===
Event	Gold	Silver	Bronze
Individual all-around	Aleksandra Shchekoldina (RUS)	Vladislava Urazova (RUS)	Anastasiya Miroshnichenko (UZB)
Vault	Vladislava Urazova (RUS)	Anna Subbotina (GEO)	Darya Yassinskaya (KAZ)
Uneven Bars	Aleksandra Shchekoldina (RUS)	Ksenia Klimenko (RUS)	Elina Vihrova (LAT)
Balance Beam	Varvara Zubova (RUS)	Darya Belousova (UKR)	Elina Vihrova (LAT)
Floor Exercise	Vladislava Urazova (RUS)	Dildora Aripova (UZB)	Aleksandra Shchekoldina (RUS)
