= 2018 Russian Artistic Gymnastics Championships =

Russian Artistic Gymnastics Championships
- Location: Kazan, Russia
- Date: April 18–22, 2018

The 2018 Russian Artistic Gymnastics Championships was held in Kazan, Russia between 18–22 April 2018.

== Medalists ==
Event	Gold	Silver	Bronze
Women
Team	Moscow - 1 Aliya Mustafina; Uliana Perebinosova; Angelina Simakova; Daria Spiridonova; Viktoria Trykina; Varvara Zubova	Central Federal District; Taisia Borozdyko; Anastasia Budylkina; Daria Elizarova; Darina Goldinova; Viktoria Komova; Angelina Melnikova	Moscow - 2 Ksenia Artemova; Viktoria Gazeeva; Viktoria Gorbatova; Elizaveta Kochetkova; Seda Tutkhalyan; Valentina Shokhina
All-around	Angelina Melnikova	Angelina Simakova	Viktoria Komova
Vault	Viktoria Trykina	Angelina Melnikova	Tatiana Nabieva
Uneven bars	Angelina Melnikova	Irina Alexeeva	Viktoria Komova
Balance beam	Angelina Melnikova	Ksenia Kamkova	Polina Fedorova
Floor	Angelina Melnikova	Angelina Simakova	Irina Alexeeva

== Results ==
=== All-Around ===
Rank	Gymnast	Team	Vault (gymnastics)	Uneven bars	Balance beam	Floor (gymnastics)	Day 1	Total
1st place, gold medalist(s)	Angelina Melnikova	Central	14.466	14.433	13.300	13.566	57.732	113.497
2nd place, silver medalist(s)	Angelina Simakova	Moscow	14.566	13.600	12.733	13.766	55.432	110.097
3rd place, bronze medalist(s)	Viktoria Komova	Central/Moscow	14.400	13.933	13.366	12.066	54.365	108.130
4	Aliya Mustafina	Moscow/Volga	12.433	14.566	12.533	13.066	55.432	108.030
5	Uliana Perebinosova	Moscow	12.866	14.100	13.200	12.900	53.965	107.031
6	Anastasia Iliankova	Siberia	13.633	13.433	12.466	12.400	54.298	106.230
7	Irina Alexeeva	Guest	13.733	12.433	13.400	12.833	53.732	106.131
8	Daria Elizarova	Central	13.666	12.100	12.966	13.566	52.965	105.263
9	Viktoria Gorbatova	Moscow	13.166	12.600	12.633	12.966	53.299	104.664
10	Ksenia Kamkova	Ural	13.666	11.300	12.666	13.033	51.132	101.797
11	Daria Spiridonova	Moscow	13.333	13.233	12.400	12.333	50.266	101.565
12	Tatiana Nabieva	St Petersburg	14.166	13.366	10.333	12.366	51.199	101.430
13	Varvara Zubova	Moscow	13.000	12.266	12.533	12.600	49.965	100.364
14	Viktoria Trykina	Moscow	14.100	10.833	12.433	12.100	50.432	99.898
15	Polina Fedorova	Volga	13.333	10.933	12.666	12.733	49.532	99.197
16	Viktoria Gazeeva	Moscow	13.133	12.200	11.800	11.633	49.232	97.998
17	Varvara Batalova	St Petersburg	13.033	11.966	10.833	13.000	49.165	97.997
18	Daria Skrypnik	Southern	13.366	12.400	8.200	11.866	51.332	97.164
19	Ksenia Artemova	Moscow	13.366	11.566	11.200	12.166	47.298	95.596
20	Elizaveta Volodina	Volga	12.800	11.166	12.033	11.100	47.498	94.597
21	Ekaterina Mitrofanova	St Petersburg	13.333	10.633	12.166	11.300	46.965	94.397
22	Ekaterina Boeva	St Petersburg	12.000	10.966	11.266	12.166	47.498	93.896
23	Diana Sigitova	Volga	12.833	11.066	10.500	11.700	47.299	93.398
24	Anastasia Gainetdinova	Volga	12.733	8.866	11.666	12.300	47.332	92.897

=== Vault ===
Rank	Gymnast	Team	Vault 1	Vault 2	Average
Gold medal	Viktoria Trykina	Moscow	14.300	14.100	14.200
Silver medal	Angelina Melnikova	Central	14.466	13.633	14.049
Bronze medal	Tatiana Nabieva	St Petersburg	14.366	13.633	13.999
4	Eleonora Afanasyeva	Northwestern	14.200	13.733	13.966
5	Angelina Simakova	Moscow	14.233	13.400	13.816
6	Yuliya Biryulya	Siberia	13.400	13.133	13.266
7	Seda Tutkhalyan	Moscow	13.000	13.100	13.050
8	Ksenia Kamkova	Ural	12.733	12.633	12.683

=== Uneven Bars ===
Rank	Gymnast	Team	Total
Gold medal	Angelina Melnikova	Central	14.266
Silver medal	Irina Alexeeva	Guest	14.066
Bronze medal	Viktoria Komova	Central/Moscow	13.633
4	Angelina Simakova	Moscow	13.500
5	Viktoria Gorbatova	Moscow	12.633
6	Aliya Mustafina	Moscow/Volga	12.233
7	Anastasia Iliankova	Siberia	11.433
8	Uliana Perebinosova	Moscow	10.966

=== Balance Beam ===
Rank	Gymnast	Team	Total
Gold medal	Angelina Melnikova	Central	13.466
Silver medal	Ksenia Kamkova	Ural	13.233
Bronze medal	Polina Fedorova	Volga	12.866
4	Aliya Mustafina	Moscow/Volga	12.866
5	Daria Elizarova	Central	12.466
6	Viktoria Komova	Central/Moscow	12.433
7	Anastasia Iliankova	Siberia	12.200
8	Maria Kharenkova	Southern	11.300

=== Floor Exercise ===
Rank	Gymnast	Team	Total
Gold medal	Angelina Melnikova	Central	14.500
Silver medal	Angelina Simakova	Moscow	13.466
Bronze medal	Irina Alexeeva	Guest	13.333
4	Daria Elizarova	Central	13.166
5	Uliana Perebinosova	Moscow	12.966
6	Viktoria Gorbatova	Moscow	12.766
7	Viktoria Trykina	Moscow	12.366
8	Ksenia Kamkova	Ural	12.100
