= Dildora Aripova =

Uzbek artistic gymnast (born 2004)

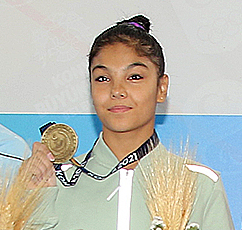
- Aripova at the Islamic Solidarity Games in 2022

Personal information
- Full name: Dildora Dilshod Kizi Aripova
- Born: 29 January 2004 (age 22) Tashkent, Uzbekistan

Gymnastics career
- Discipline: Women's artistic gymnastics
- Country represented: Uzbekistan; (2016–present)
- Head coach: Elvira Rakova
Medal record
Women's artistic gymnastics
Representing Uzbekistan
Asian Championships
Bronze medal – third place	2024 Tashkent	Team
Islamic Solidarity Games
Gold medal – first place	2021 Konya	Balance Beam
Silver medal – second place	2021 Konya	Team
Silver medal – second place	2021 Konya	All-Around
South Central Asian Championships
Gold medal – first place	2021 Dhaka	Team
Gold medal – first place	2021 Dhaka	Uneven Bars
Gold medal – first place	2021 Dhaka	Balance Beam
FIG World Cup
Event	1st	2nd	3rd
Apparatus World Cup	0	1	1
World Challenge Cup	1	1	1
Total	1	2	2

Dildora Dilshod Kizi Aripova (Uzbek: Dildora Dilshod qizi Aripova; born 29 January 2004) is an Uzbek artistic gymnast. She represented Uzbekistan at the inaugural junior World Championships.

== Early life ==
Aripova was born in Tashkent, Uzbekistan. She began training in gymnastics in 2010 and joined the national team of Uzbekistan in 2016.

== Junior gymnastics career ==
=== 2017 ===
Aripova made her international debut at the junior Asian Gymnastics Championships. She placed 9h in the all-around, fifth balance beam, and eighth on floor exercise. She next competed at the 2017 Voronin Cup where she placed fourth in the all-around behind Russians Aleksandra Shchekoldina and Vladislava Urazova and compatriot Anastasiya Miroshnichenko. Additionally she placed fifth on uneven bars, fourth on balance beam, and second on floor exercise.

=== 2018–19 ===
Aripova began the 2018 season competing at the President's Cup in Almaty in the espoir division. She won gold in the all-around, vault, balance beam, and floor exercise, and won silver on the uneven bars. She next competed at the 2018 Junior Asian Championships where she placed sixth on uneven bars and floor exercise and helped Uzbekistan finish fourth. She next competed at Tournoi International where she finished fourteenth and at the Voronin Cup where she placed seventh in the all-around, fourth on balance beam, and eighth on floor exercise.

In June 2019 Aripova competed at the inaugural Junior World Championships alongside Anastasiya Miroshnichenko and Anna Silnova. Aripova finished 34th in the all-around and was the second highest placing Uzbek gymnast. In December she competed at the Voronin Cup where she placed third in the all-around and on balance beam, fourth on vault, fifth on floor exercise, and sixth on uneven bars.

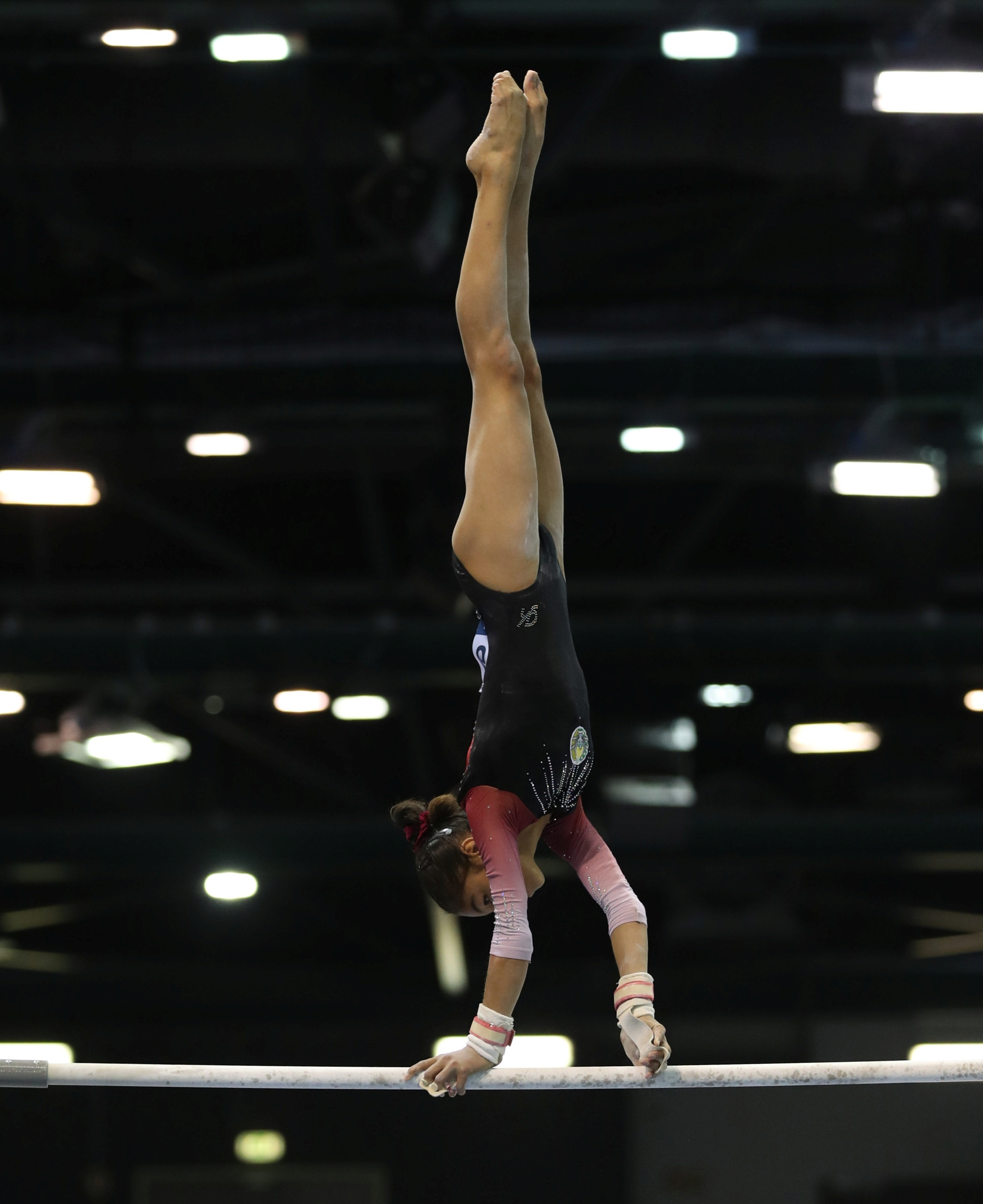
Uneven Bars

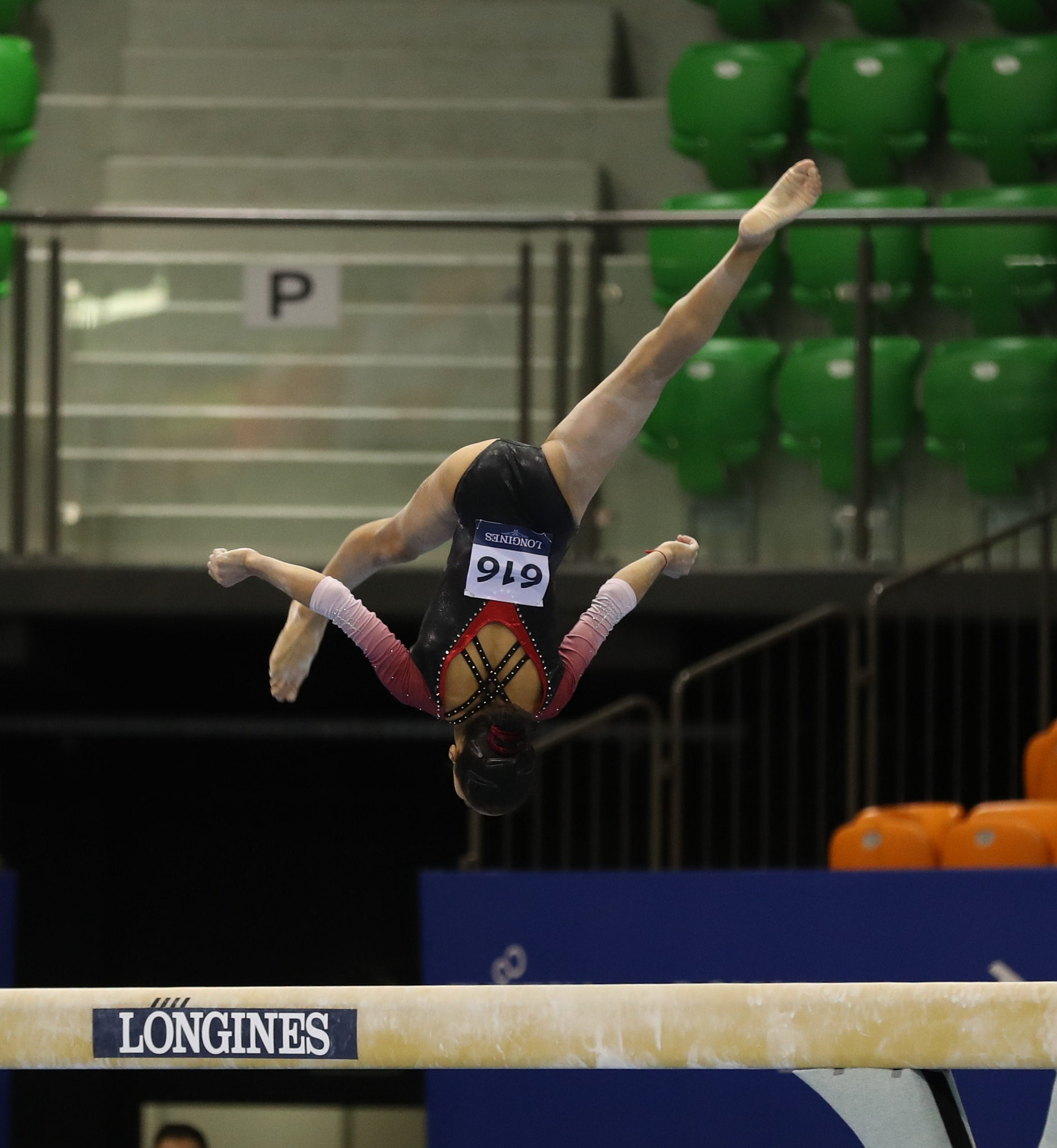
Balance Beam

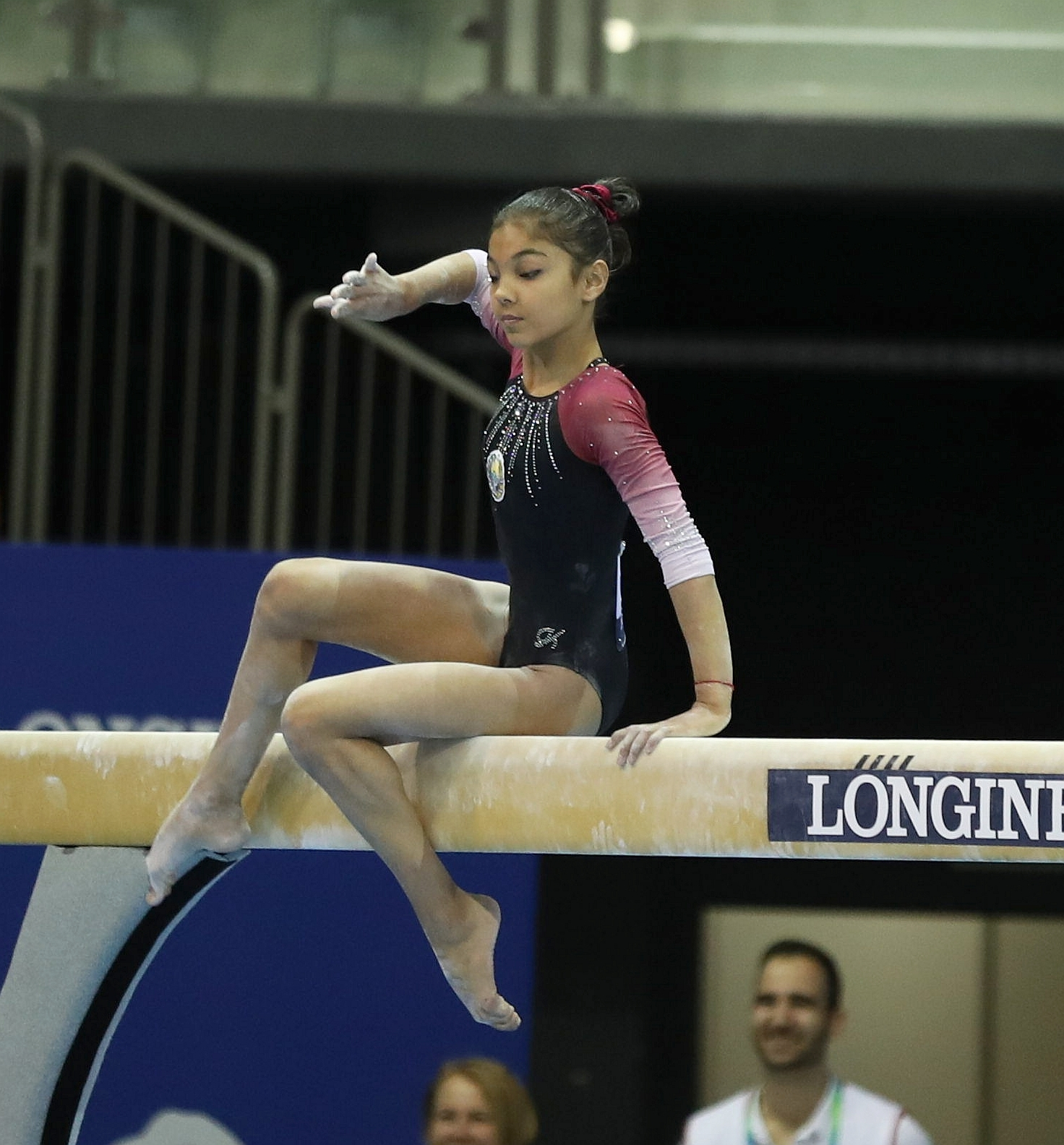
Balance Beam

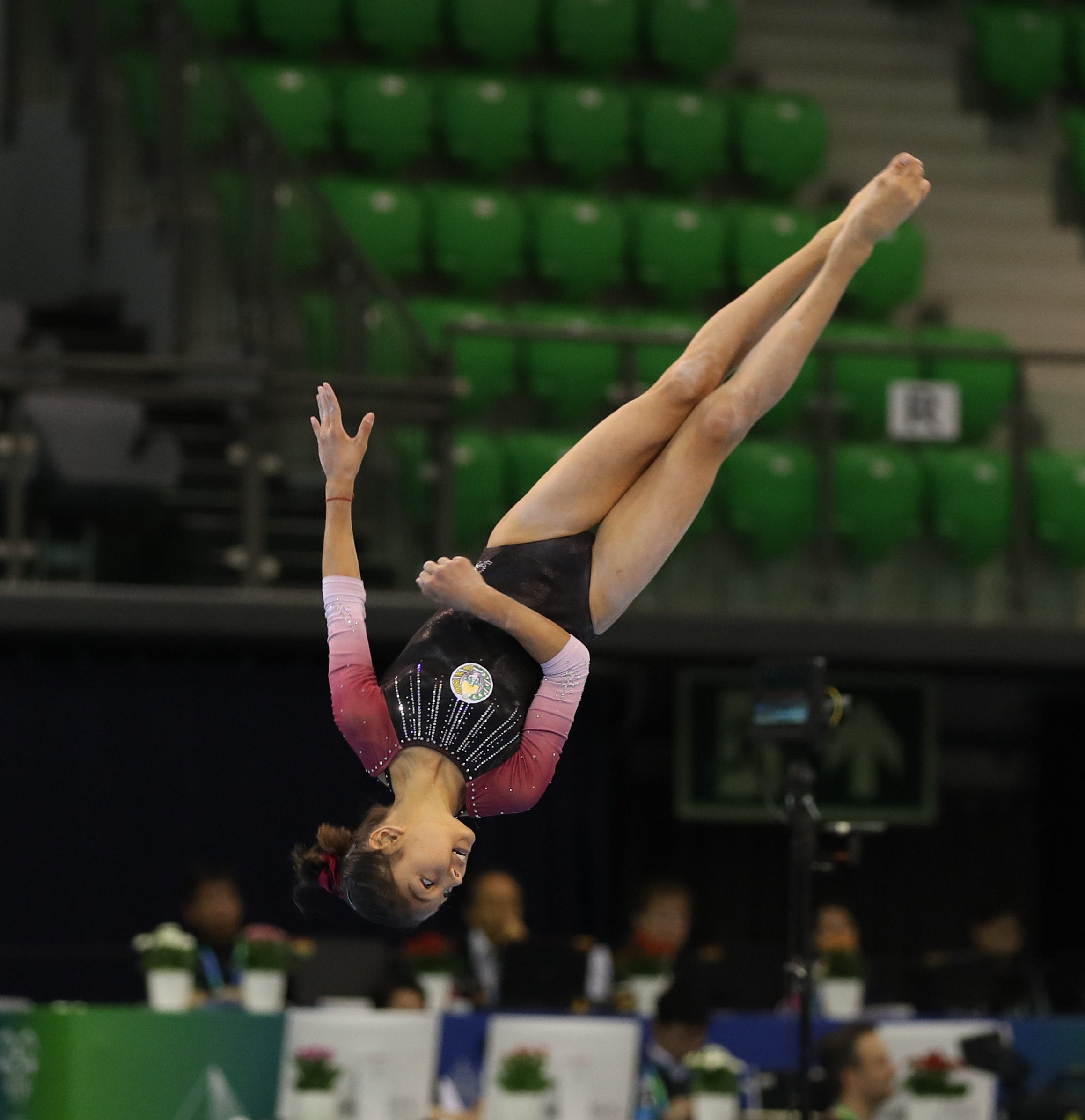
Floor Exercise

Aripova at the 2019 Junior World Championships

== Senior gymnastics career ==
=== 2021 ===
Aripova turned senior in 2020; however the mass majority of competitions were either canceled or postponed due to the global COVID-19 pandemic. She made her senior international debut at the Varna Challenge Cup where she finished first on floor exercise, tied with Hanna Szujó. In October Aripova competed at the South Central Asian Championships alongside Anastasiya Miroshnichenko, Giunaz Jumabekova, and Ominakhon Khalilova. They finished first as a team and individually Aripova scored the third highest all-around score but did not place due to Miroshnichenko and Khalilova scoring higher. She qualified to two event finals. During event finals Aripova won gold on the uneven bars and balance beam.

=== 2022 ===
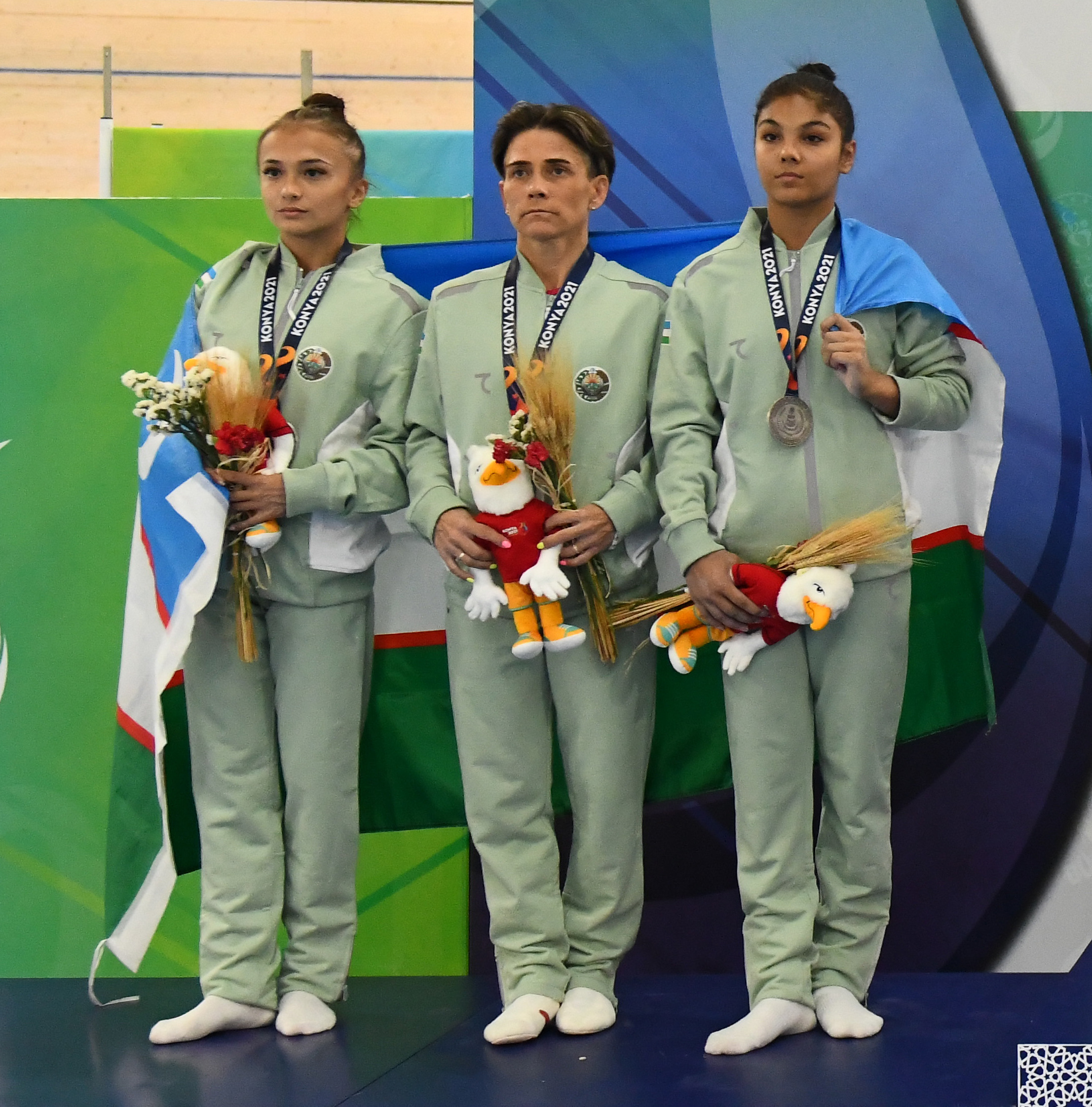
Aripova (right) and team Uzbekistan at the 2021 Islamic Solidarity Games

Aripova competed at the Cairo World Cup. She placed eighth on uneven bars but won silver on floor exercise behind Hungarian Dorina Böczögő. She next competed at the Baku World Cup. She finished third on floor exercise. At the Asian Championships Aripova finished twelfth in the all-around and qualified to compete as an individual at the 2022 World Championships. Additionally she placed fourth during the floor exercise final.

In August Aripova competed at the Islamic Solidarity Games alongside Oksana Chusovitina and Ominakhon Khalilova. They finished second as a team behind Turkey. Individually Aripova placed second in the all-around behind Bengisu Yıldız but won gold on the balance beam.

== Competitive history ==
Competitive history of Dildora Aripova
Year	Event	Team	AA	VT	UB	BB	FX
2017
2017	Junior Asian Championships	4	9			5	8
2017	Voronin Cup		4		5	4	2nd place, silver medalist(s)
2018	President's Cup		1st place, gold medalist(s)	1st place, gold medalist(s)	2nd place, silver medalist(s)	1st place, gold medalist(s)	1st place, gold medalist(s)
2018	Junior Asian Championships	4			6		6
2018	Tournoi International		14			5	
2018	Voronin Cup		7			4	8
2019
2019	Junior World Championships	17	34				
2019	Voronin Cup		3rd place, bronze medalist(s)	4	6	3rd place, bronze medalist(s)	5
2021	Varna Challenge Cup						1st place, gold medalist(s)
2021	South Central Asian Championships	1st place, gold medalist(s)			1st place, gold medalist(s)	1st place, gold medalist(s)	
2022	Cairo World Cup				8		2nd place, silver medalist(s)
2022	Baku World Cup						3rd place, bronze medalist(s)
2022	Varna Challenge Cup						8
2022	Asian Championships	6	12				4
2022	Islamic Solidarity Games	2nd place, silver medalist(s)	2nd place, silver medalist(s)	4	6	1st place, gold medalist(s)	4
2022	World Championships				135		
2023	Cottbus World Cup			8		8	
2023	Doha World Cup						4
2023	Cairo World Cup				8		
2023	Asian Championships	7	8				
2023	World Championships		73				
2024
2024	Asian Championships	3rd place, bronze medalist(s)			7		
2025	Cairo World Cup				8		4
2025	World Championships		54				
2026	Russian Cup		10				
2026	Tashkent World Challenge Cup				6	3rd place, bronze medalist(s)	2nd place, silver medalist(s)
2026	Asian Championships	6	11				
2026	Asian Games				R3	R3	4
