= List of Olympic female artistic gymnasts for Uzbekistan =

Gymnastics events have been staged at the Olympic Games since 1896. Uzbekistani female artistic gymnasts have participated in every Olympic Games since 1996, except for 2012 when Luiza Galiulina competed in the event, but was eventually disqualified for doping. Uzbekistani women have yet to win a medal at the Olympics.

== Gymnasts ==
Gymnast	Years	Ref.
Oksana Chusovitina^{1}	1996, 2000, 2004, 2016, 2020	
Anastasia Dzyundzyak	1996	
Luiza Galiulina^{2}	2008, ~~2012~~	

Notes

^{1} In 2008 and 2012, Chusovitina represented Germany.
^{2} In 2012, Galiulina was expelled from the Olympic Games for doping.

== See also ==
- Uzbekistan women's national gymnastics team
