= Anastasia Dzyundzyak =

Uzbekistani artistic gymnast (born 1979)

- Born: March 26, 1979 (age 47)

Gymnastics career
- Discipline: Women's artistic gymnastics
- Country represented: Uzbekistan

Anastasia Dzyundzyak (born 26 March 1979) is a former Uzbekistani artistic gymnast. She competed at the 1996 Summer Olympics.

== See also ==
- List of Olympic female artistic gymnasts for Uzbekistan
