= 2020 Russian Artistic Gymnastics Championships =

Gymnastics competition in Russia

Russian Artistic Gymnastics Championships
- Location: Penza, Russia
- Date: October 28 – November 8, 2020

The 2020 Russian Artistic Gymnastics Championships was held in Penza, Russia between 28 October–8 November 2020. There was limited participation as some gymnasts were competing at the Friendship & Solidary Competition in Tokyo and others opted not to attend due to the ongoing COVID-19 pandemic.

== Medalists ==
Event	Gold	Silver	Bronze
Women
Team	Saint Petersburg; Ekaterina Boeva; Elena Eremina; Anastasia Kureyeva; Tatiana Nabieva	Moscow; Rukhshona Azamova; Uliana Perebinosova; Elizaveta Serova; Viktoria Trykina	Southern Federal District; Yuliya Biryulya; Maria Kharenkova; Kristina Romanova; Daria Skrypnik
All-around	Uliana Perebinosova	Anastasia Kureyeva	Viktoria Trykina
Vault	Tatiana Nabieva	Viktoria Trykina	Alexandra Mayzel
Uneven bars	Anastasia Ilyankova	Uliana Perebinosova	Irina Komnova
Balance beam	Maria Kharenkova	Elena Eremina	Uliana Perebinosova
Floor	Uliana Perebinosova	Anastasia Kureyeva	Yulia Biryulya
Men
Team	Central Federal District; Viktor Britan; Aleksandr Kartsev; Ilya Kibartas; Vladislav Novokshonov	Siberian Federal District; Ivan Gerget; Andrei Lagutov; Nikita Letnikov; Oleg Stepko	Volga; Artyom Pleshkin; Mikhail Khudchenko; Oleg Stupkin; Ildar Yuskaev
All-around	Aleksandr Kartsev	Viktor Britan	Artem Pleshkin
Floor	Ivan Sivkov	Daniil Ivanov	Aleksei Usachev
Pommel horse	Ivan Shestakov	Ildar Yuskaev	Oleg Stempko
Rings	Denis Ablyazin	Oleg Stupkin	Ilya Kibartas
Vault	Artem Pleshkin	Ivan Elkin	Vladislav Novokshonov
Parallel bars	Aleksandr Kartsev	Sergei Eltsov	Daniil Monakhov
High bar	Sergei Eltsov	Aleksandr Kartsev	Ivan Gerget

== Results ==
=== All-Around ===
Rank	Gymnast	Team	Vault (gymnastics)	Uneven bars	Balance beam	Floor (gymnastics)	Day 1	Total
1st place, gold medalist(s)	Uliana Perebinosova	Moscow	13.500	12.833	13.333	13.433	53.099	106.597
2nd place, silver medalist(s)	Anastasia Kureyeva	Saint Petersburg	13.566	12.166	13.233	13.066	52.031	104.829
3rd place, bronze medalist(s)	Viktoria Trykina	Moscow	13.633	12.100	13.000	12.900	51.633	103.965
4	Elena Eremina	Saint Petersburg	13.300	11.600	13.133	12.400	50.433	101.432
5	Maria Kharenkova	Southern Federal District	12.933	10.966	13.400	13.066	50.365	100.697
6	Alina Shklokova	Northwestern Federal District	13.500	12.466	13.233	12.466	51.665	99.930
7	Yuliya Biryulya	Southern Federal District	13.566	12.966	11.433	13.100	51.065	99.330
8	Daria Skrypnik	Southern Federal District	13.366	12.266	12.066	12.566	50.264	98.829
9	Ekaterina Boeva	Saint Petersburg	11.933	11.433	12.133	12.700	48.199	97.931
10	Kristina Kazan	Saint Petersburg	12.333	11.833	11.766	12.466	48.398	95.230
11	Elena Likhodolskaya	Central Federal District	11.933	10.000	12.366	12.300	46.599	94.630
12	Daria Samonova	Central Federal District	11.900	10.600	11.833	11.400	45.733	93.865
13	Alexandra Mayzel	Siberia	13.600	9.933	10.700	12.200	46.433	92.831
14	Viktoria Ganeyeva	Volga	12.233	11.133	10.533	12.033	45.932	92.498
15	Zlata Alimova	Siberia	12.400	10.600	11.633	12.466	47.099	92.465

=== Vault ===
Rank	Gymnast	Team	Vault 1	Vault 2	Average
Gold medal	Tatiana Nabieva	St. Petersburg	14.600	13.533	14.066
Silver medal	Viktoria Trykina	Moscow	14.033	13.433	13.733
Bronze medal	Alexandra Mayzel	Siberia	13.700	13.766	13.733
4	Yulia Biryulya	Southern	13.633	13.533	13.583
5	Anastasia Kureyeva	St. Petersburg	12.466	13.000	12.733
6	Daria Skrypnik	Southern	12.200	12.966	12.583
7	Ksenia Kuzmicheva	Volga	12.800	12.133	12.466
8	Alina Shklokova	Northwestern	12.866	DNS	DNF

=== Uneven Bars ===
Rank	Gymnast	Team	Total
Gold medal	Anastasia Ilyankova	Siberia	14.766
Silver medal	Uliana Perebinosova	Moscow	14.333
Bronze medal	Irina Komnova	Central Federal District	13.300
4	Tatiana Nabieva	St. Petersburg	13.266
5	Elena Eremina	St. Petersburg	12.666
6	Anastasia Moiseyeva	Siberia	11.766
7	Ekaterina Boeva	St. Petersburg	11.666
8	Anastasia Kureyeva	St. Petersburg	11.166

=== Balance Beam ===
Rank	Gymnast	Team	Total
Gold medal	Maria Kharenkova	Southern	13.466
Silver medal	Elena Eremina	St. Petersburg	13.033
Bronze medal	Uliana Perebinosova	Moscow	12.866
Bronze medal	Viktoria Trykina	Moscow	12.866
5	Anastasia Kureyeva	St. Petersburg	11.766
6	Kristina Kazan	St. Petersburg	11.666
7	Daria Samonova	Central	11.600
8	Ekaterina Boeva	St. Petersburg	11.033

=== Floor Exercise ===
Rank	Gymnast	Team	Total
Gold medal	Uliana Perebinosova	Moscow	13.333
Silver medal	Anastasia Kureyeva	St. Petersburg	12.900
Bronze medal	Yulia Biryulya	Southern Federal District	12.833
4	Ekaterina Boeva	St. Petersburg	12.733
5	Maria Kharenkova	Southern Federal District	12.433
6	Daria Skrypnik	Southern Federal District	12.200
7	Kristina Kazan	St. Petersburg	12.066
8	Daria Samonova	Central Federal District	11.733
