= Irina Alexeeva =

Russian artistic gymnast (born 2002)

Irina Alexeeva Ири́на Алексе́ева
- Full name: Irina Nikolayevna Alexeeva
- Nickname: Ira
- Born: 20 April 2002 (age 24) Moscow, Russia
- Height: 5 ft 3 in (160 cm)

Gymnastics career
- Discipline: Women's artistic gymnastics
- Country represented: Russia; (2018–2019)
- College team: Stanford Cardinal (2021–2024)
- Club: WOGA
Medal record
Representing Russia
World Championships
| Silver medal – second place | 2018 Doha | Team |
European Championships
| Gold medal – first place | 2018 Glasgow | Team |

Irina Nikolayevna Alexeeva or Alekseeva (Russian: Ири́на Никола́евна Алексе́ева, born 20 April 2002) is a Russian artistic gymnast and a former member of the Russian National Team. She was part of the teams that won the gold medal at the 2018 European Championships and the silver medal at the 2018 World Championships.

== Early life ==
Alexeeva was born in Moscow, Russia, and began her gymnastics there training under Dina Kamalova, the same coach as eventual Olympic champion Aliya Mustafina. She has an elder brother, Andrey. In 2010, Alexeeva moved to the United States when she was 7 following Kamalova's departure, and resumed training under her at the World Olympic Gymnastics Academy, the same gym where Olympic champions Carly Patterson and Nastia Liukin trained and where eventual Olympic champion Madison Kocian was currently training.

== Gymnastics career ==
=== 2016–2017 ===
Alexeeva qualified as a junior elite gymnast in 2016, making her elite debut at the American Classic that May. She finished third in the all-around and on uneven bars, winning one gold on balance beam. In June, she competed at the U.S. Classic, placing first in both the junior all-around competition and the balance beam. However, she was ineligible to compete at the 2016 U.S. National Gymnastics Championships in St. Louis, Missouri as she was not an American citizen.

Alexeeva spent the 2017 season recovering from an injury.

=== 2018 ===
In her first year as a Senior gymnast, Alexeeva competed at International Gymnix in Canada, where she won the bronze medal in the All-Around and the gold medal on floor exercise and uneven bars. After being unable to obtain American citizenship, Alexeeva competed at the Russian National Championships in April in hopes of making the Russian National Team. There she placed 7th in the All-Around after falling off the balance beam. She also placed second on uneven bars, behind Angelina Melnikova and ahead of 2011 and 2015 World Champion Viktoria Komova, and third on floor exercise, behind Melnikova and Angelina Simakova. In May, Alexeeva was officially added to the Russian National Team, replacing Natalia Kapitonova. She later returned to Moscow and began training at Round Lake.

In June, she received her FIG license, enabling her to officially represent Russia in international competitions. Later that month, Alexeeva was slated to compete at the Russian Cup but had to pull out due to a knee injury.

On 20 July, Alexeeva was named to the Russian team to compete at the 2018 European Championships alongside Melnikova, Simakova, Lilia Akhaimova, and Uliana Perebinosova. Alexeeva only competed on uneven bars and balance beam in the qualification. She scored high enough to qualify to the Uneven Bars Finals but did not qualify due to her teammates Melnikova and Perebinosova scoring higher. She once again competed on uneven bars and balance beam in the Team Finals where Russia won the gold medal.

On 29 September, Alexeeva was named on the nominative team roster to compete at the 2018 World Championships in Doha, Qatar alongside Akhaimova, Melnikova, Aliya Mustafina, and Simakova. On 17 October, the World team was officially announced and was unchanged from the nominative team. During qualifications Alexeeva competed on all four events. She qualified to the All-Around in 12th and Russia qualified to the Team Final in second place. During the team final Alexeeva competed on vault, uneven bars, and balance beam, helping Russia win the silver medal. In the All-Around Final she finished 13th.

=== 2019 ===
Despite being named to the national team for 2019, Valentina Rodionenko confirmed that Alexeeva had left the national team in order to focus on NCAA gymnastics in the United States. While Alexeeva had not announced any commitments, she had an official visit to Stanford University the previous fall, sparking rumors that she'd join their gymnastics team.

On September 20, Alexeeva announced on Instagram that she will be attending Stanford University and competing on their gymnastics team, starting in the 2020–2021 school year. She will be the first Russian national WAG team member to compete in NCAA gymnastics. In November she signed her National Letter of Intent with the Stanford Cardinal gymnastics team.

== Collegiate gymnastics career ==
Alexeeva redshirted the 2020–2021 season due to having 90 bone chips removed from her hip. She made her collegiate debut in 2022. She competed in four meets before stopping to focus on her continued recovery.

Alexeeva returned to competition on January 6, 2023 at the Super 16 Invitational where she only competed on uneven bars. The following week she competed in a dual meet against San Jose where she made her collegiate debut on balance beam. She earned scores of 9.875 (uneven bars) and 9.85 (balance beam) towards Stanford's victory. She was named Pac-12 Coaches Choice of the Week.

== Competitive history ==
| Year | Event | Team | AA | VT | UB | BB | FX |
Junior
| 2016 | WOGA Classic | | 1st place, gold medalist(s) | 1st place, gold medalist(s) | 1st place, gold medalist(s) | 1st place, gold medalist(s) | 1st place, gold medalist(s) |
| 2016 | International Gymnix | | 6 | | 1st place, gold medalist(s) | | |
| 2016 | American Classic | | 3rd place, bronze medalist(s) | | | | |
| 2016 | U.S. Classic | | 1st place, gold medalist(s) | 16 | 4 | 1st place, gold medalist(s) | 2nd place, silver medalist(s) |
| 2016 | Élite Gym Massilia | | 1st place, gold medalist(s) | | 1st place, gold medalist(s) | 3rd place, bronze medalist(s) | |
Senior
| 2018 | WOGA Classic | | 3rd place, bronze medalist(s) | 4 | 2nd place, silver medalist(s) | 8 | 1st place, gold medalist(s) |
| 2018 | International Gymnix | | 3rd place, bronze medalist(s) | | 1st place, gold medalist(s) | | 1st place, gold medalist(s) |
| 2018 | National Championships | | 7 | | 2nd place, silver medalist(s) | | 3rd place, bronze medalist(s) |
| 2018 | European Championships | 1st place, gold medalist(s) | | | | | |
| 2018 | World Championships | 2nd place, silver medalist(s) | 13 | | | | |

== International Scores ==
| Year | Competition Description | Location | Apparatus | Rank-Final | Score-Final | Rank-Qualifying | Score-Qualifying |
|---|---|---|---|---|---|---|---|
| 2018 | European Championships | Glasgow | Team | 1 | 165.195 | 2 | 161.462 |
| 2018 | European Championships | Glasgow | Uneven Bars | | | 7 | 13.933 |
| 2018 | European Championships | Glasgow | Balance Beam | | | 29 | 12.333 |
| 2018 | World Championships | Doha | Team | 2 | 162.863 | 2 | 165.497 |
| 2018 | World Championships | Doha | All-Around | 13 | 53.798 | 12 | 53.532 |
| 2018 | World Championships | Doha | Uneven Bars | | | 20 | 13.833 |
| 2018 | World Championships | Doha | Balance Beam | | | 23 | 13.133 |
| 2018 | World Championships | Doha | Floor Exercise | | | 27 | 13.066 |
