= Asian Gymnastics Union =

Asian gymnastics governing body

Asian Gymnastics Union AGU
- Sport: Gymnastics
- Official website: www.agu-gymnastics.com

History
- Year of formation: October 1964; 61 years ago in Tokyo, Japan

Demographics
- Membership size: 37 members

Affiliations
- International federation: International Gymnastics Federation (FIG)
- FIG member since: 1966
- Other affiliation(s): Olympic Council of Asia

Governance
- President: (Qatar) Abdulrahman Ben Saad Al-Shathri

Headquarters
- Address: Al-Bidda Tower - 5th Floor, Al-Corniche, Doha
- Country: Qatar
- Secretary General: (Qatar) Mohamed Saed
- Official language(s): English

The Asian Gymnastics Union (AGU) is the governing body of gymnastics in Asia. It is one of the five continental confederations making up the International Gymnastics Federation (FIG). AGU was formed in October 1964 during the 1964 Summer Olympics in Tokyo (Japan), with Japan, South Korea, China and Philippines being the founder members. AGU has headquarters in Qatar and consists of 37 member federations.

== History ==
Asian Gymnastics Union (AGU) was formed as Asian Gymnastics Federation (AGF) in October 1964 during the 1964 Summer Olympics in Tokyo (Japan) with 4 national federations as founding members; Japan, South Korea, China and Philippines. The first congress held in Tokyo in June 1966 and Mr. Yoshihiko Kurimoto (Japan) become the first President. The organization held the first Asian Acrobatic Gymnastics Championships in 1992 in British Hong Kong, with teams from 4 member federations participating.

== Tournaments ==
- Asian Gymnastics Championships
- Asian Games
- Southeast Asian Games
- Asian Indoor and Martial Arts Games (defunct)

== Members ==
Central South Asian Zone

- Afghanistan
- Bangladesh
- India
- Islamic Republic of Iran
- Kyrgyzstan
- Nepal
- Islamic Republic of Pakistan
- Sri Lanka
- Turkmenistan
- Uzbekistan

West Asian Zone

- Bahrain
- Iraq
- Jordan
- Kuwait
- Lebanon
- Palestine
- Qatar
- Saudi Arabia
- Syria
- Yemen

South East Asian Zone

- Cambodia
- Indonesia
- Malaysia
- Maldives
- Myanmar
- Philippines
- Singapore
- Thailand
- Vietnam

East Asian Zone

- People's Republic of China
- Chinese Taipei
- DPR Korea
- Hong Kong, China
- Japan
- Kazakhstan
- South Korea
- Macau, China
- Mongolia
