= Viktoria Trykina =

Russian artistic gymnast

- Full name: Viktoria Georgievna Trykina
- Born: 9 May 2001 (age 25) Moscow, Russia

Gymnastics career
- Discipline: Women's artistic gymnastics
- Country represented: Russia
Medal record
Representing Russia
Women's artistic gymnastics
FIG World Cup
Event	1st	2nd	3rd
World Challenge Cup	0	0	1

Viktoria Georgievna Trykina (Russian: Виктория Георгиевна Трыкина; born 9 May 2001) is a Russian artistic gymnast. She is the 2017 Russian balance beam champion and the 2018 Russian vault champion. She won the vault bronze medal at the 2018 Osijek World Challenge Cup.

== Gymnastics career ==
At the 2014 Russian Championships, Trykina won the all-around bronze medal in the CMS division, behind Elena Eremina and Ekaterina Sokova. She won a silver medal on the floor exercise and a bronze medal on the balance beam at the 2016 Voronin Cup.

Trykina began competing at the senior level in 2017. She won the balance beam title at the 2017 Russian Championships. Additionally, she won a gold medal in the team competition with the Moscow team. Despite this result, she was only named as a reserve to the Russian national team and did not receive international assignments. At the 2017 Russian Cup, she won a silver medal on the vault, placed fifth on the balance beam, and placed seventh on the floor exercise after falling on a double piked somersault. She then won a silver medal on the balance beam, behind Maria Kharenkova, at the 2017 Voronin Cup.

Trykina won the vault final at the 2018 Russian Championships after successfully performing a Yurchenko double twist and a Lopez. She then made her senior international debut at the 2018 Osijek World Challenge Cup and won a bronze medal on the vault behind Oksana Chusovitina and Tjaša Kysselef. Additionally, she placed sixth in the balance beam final. Then at the 2018 Russian Cup, she won a silver medal on the vault behind Tatiana Nabieva. She also finished fifth in the floor exercise final. She fell in the vault final at the 2018 Voronin Cup and finished last.

Trykina finished fourth on both the vault and balance beam at the 2019 Russian Cup. At the 2020 Russian Championships, she won the bronze medal in the all-around behind Uliana Perebinosova and Anastasia Kureyeva. She then won a silver medal in the vault final, behind Tatiana Nabieva, and tied with Perebinosova for the bronze medal in the balance beam final. She won a bronze medal on the balance beam at the 2021 Russian Championships, behind Viktoria Listunova and Elena Gerasimova.
