= South Central Asian Gymnastics Championships =

Artistic Gymnastics Championship

The South Central Asian Gymnastics Championships is an artistic gymnastics competition held for gymnasts from Central and South Asian countries. It is governed by the Asian Gymnastics Union.

== Participating nations ==
- Afghanistan
- Bangladesh
- India
- Islamic Republic of Iran
- Kyrgyzstan
- Nepal
- Islamic Republic of Pakistan
- Sri Lanka
- Turkmenistan
- Uzbekistan

== Summary of championships ==
Editions	Year	Host City	Host Country	Date	Ref
I					
II	2005	Prayagraj	India	20–22 February	
III					
IV	2011	Dhaka	Bangladesh	26–28 December	
V	2021	Dhaka	Bangladesh	27–31 October	
