= Nepal Gymnastics Association =

Governing body of gymnastics in the Nepal

- Sport: Gymnastics
- Jurisdiction: Nepal
- Abbreviation: NGA
- Affiliation: International Gymnastics Federation (FIG)
- Regional affiliation: Asian Gymnastics Union
- Headquarters: Kathmandu, Nepal
- President: Dhruba Bahadur Pradhan
- Secretary: Mukunda Raj Sharma

Official website
- www.nocnepal.org.np/nepal-gymnastic-association
- (Nepal)

The Nepal Gymnastics Association (NGA) or simply Nepal Gymnastics is the governing body of gymnastics in the Nepal. The sporting body is a member of the Nepal Olympic Committee and recognized by the National Sports Council. It is also a member of the Fédération Internationale de Gymnastique and the Asian Gymnastics Union.

In 2019 all the different associations come together and formed a sole governing body in Nepal related to Gymnastic Sports.

== Affiliated associations ==
- Bhaktapur Gymnastics Association
