= Pakistan Gymnastics Federation =

Pakistani sports governing body

Pakistan Gymnastic Federation
- Sport: Gymnastics
- Jurisdiction: Pakistan
- Abbreviation: PGF
- Affiliation: International Federation of Gymnastics
- Affiliation date: 1958
- Regional affiliation: Asian Gymnastics Union
- Affiliation date: 1954
- Headquarters: Lahore
- Location: Olympic House, Temple Road
- President: Parvaiz Ahmed
- Chairman: Ahmed Ali Rajpoot
- Secretary: Khalid Mahmood

Official website
- nocpakistan.org/gymnastics/
- (Pakistan)

The Pakistan Gymnastics Federation is the governing body of Gymnastics in the Pakistan.

== Affiliations ==
The federation is affiliated with:

- International Federation of Gymnastics
- Asian Gymnastics Union
- Pakistan Sports Board
- Pakistan Olympic Association

== Affiliated Units ==
- Punjab Gymnastics Association
- Sindh Gymnastics Association
- Khyber Pakhtunkhwa Gymnastics Association
- Balochistan Gymnastics Association
- Capital Gymnastics Association (Islamabad)
- Pakistan Army
- Pakistan Airforce
- Pakistan Navy
- Pakistan Police
- WAPDA
- Pakistan Railways
- Higher Education Commission

== National Championship ==
Gymnastics is regular event at biannual National Games. In addition following events are organized by gymnastic federation each year:

- National Men Gymnastic Championship
- National Women Gymnastics Championship
- Under 18 National Gymnastic Championship
- Under 14 National Gymnastic Championship
- Inter Provincial Gymnastics Championship
