= Yuta Ueda =

Japanese footballer

Yuta Ueda 植田 悠太
Personal information
- Date of birth: 6 July 2004 (age 22)
- Place of birth: Shiga, Japan
- Height: 1.71 m (5 ft 7 in)
- Position: Defender

Team information
- Current team: JEF United Chiba (on loan from Kyoto Sanga)
- Number: 26

Youth career
- FC Seta 2002 Shiga
- –2022: Kyoto Sanga

Senior career*
| Years | Team | Apps | (Gls) |
| 2022– | Kyoto Sanga | 0 | (0) |
| 2024 | → Omiya Ardija (loan) | 9 | (0) |
| 2025– | → JEF United Chiba (loan) | 5 | (0) |

International career^{‡}
| 2019 | Japan U15 | 3 | (0) |
| 2019–2020 | Japan U16 | 4 | (0) |
| 2021 | Japan U17 | | |
- * Club domestic league appearances and goals as of 22:00, 11 April 2026 (UTC) ‡ National team caps and goals as of 17:04, 23 February 2022 (UTC)

Yuta Ueda (植田 悠太, Ueda Yuta; born 6 July 2004) is a Japanese footballer currently playing as a defender for J1 League club JEF United Chiba, on loan from Kyoto Sanga.

== Career statistics ==
=== Club ===
As of 11 April 2026.

Appearances and goals by club, season and competition
| Club | Season | League | | | National cup (Note: Includes Emperors Cup) | | League cup (Note: Includes J.League Cup) | | Total | |
| Club | Season | Division | Apps | Goals | Apps | Goals | Apps | Goals | Apps | Goals |
|---|---|---|---|---|---|---|---|---|---|---|
| Kyoto Sanga | 2022 | J1 League | 0 | 0 | 1 | 0 | 2 | 0 | 3 | 0 |
| Kyoto Sanga | 2023 | J1 League | 0 | 0 | 1 | 0 | 3 | 0 | 4 | 0 |
| Kyoto Sanga | Total | | 0 | 0 | 2 | 0 | 5 | 0 | 7 | 0 |
| Omiya Ardija (loan) | 2024 | J3 League | 9 | 0 | – | | 1 | 0 | 10 | 0 |
| JEF United Chiba (loan) | 2025 | J2 League | 5 | 0 | 1 | 0 | – | | 6 | 0 |
| Career total | | | 14 | 0 | 3 | 0 | 6 | 0 | 23 | 0 |
