= 2021 South Central Asian Gymnastics Championships =

2021 Central Asian Gymnastics Championships

- Venue: Mirpur Stadium
- Location: Dhaka, Bangladesh
- Start date: 27 October 2021
- End date: 31 October 2021

The 2021 South Central Asian Gymnastics Championships was an artistic gymnastics competition held in Dhaka, Bangladesh. The event was held between 27 and 31 October.

== Medalists ==
Event	Gold	Silver	Bronze
Men
Team all-around	(Uzbekistan) Uzbekistan; Asadbek Azamov; Utkirbek Juraev; Abdulaziz Mirvaliev; Bekhruz Temirov	(India) India; Arik Dey; Debang Dey; Omkar Shinde; Siddhartha Verma	Sri Lanka
Individual all-around	Utkirbek Juraev; Uzbekistan	Asadbek Azamov; Uzbekistan	Omkar Shinde; India
Floor	Abdulaziz Mirvaliev; Uzbekistan	Arik Dey; India	Asadbek Azamov; Uzbekistan
Pommel horse	Debang Dey; India	Utkirbek Juraev; Uzbekistan	Asadbek Azamov; Uzbekistan
Rings	Omkar Shinde; India	Miribek Uzakbaev; Uzbekistan	Siddhartha Verma; India
Vault	Abdulaziz Mirvaliev; Uzbekistan	Asadbek Azamov; Uzbekistan	Siddhartha Verma; India
Parallel bars	Omkar Shinde; India	Asadbek Azamov; Uzbekistan	Siddhartha Verma; India
Horizontal bar	Utkirbek Juraev; Uzbekistan	Siddhartha Verma; India	Bekhruz Temirov; Uzbekistan
Women
Team all-around	(Uzbekistan) Uzbekistan; Dildora Aripova; Giunaz Jumabekova; Ominakhon Khalilova; Anastasiya Miroshnichenko	(India) India; Papiya Das; Soumyashree Das; Surabhi Prasanna Pasaria; Karishma Rajput	Sri Lanka
Individual all-around	Anastasiya Miroshnichenko; Uzbekistan	Ominakhon Khalilova; Uzbekistan	Karishma Rajput; India
Vault	Anastasiya Miroshnichenko; Uzbekistan	Giunaz Jumabekova; Uzbekistan	Banafuly Chakma; Bangladesh
Uneven bars	Dildora Aripova; Uzbekistan	Anastasiya Miroshnichenko; Uzbekistan	Karishma Rajput; India
Balance beam	Dildora Aripova; Uzbekistan	Ominakhon Khalilova; Uzbekistan	Soumyashree Das; India
Floor	Anastasiya Miroshnichenko; Uzbekistan	Ominakhon Khalilova; Uzbekistan	Karishma Rajput; India

== Participating nations ==
- Bangladesh
- India
- Nepal
- Pakistan
- Sri Lanka
- Uzbekistan
