= Uzbekistan women's national artistic gymnastics team =

National sports team

Uzbekistan
- Continental union: Asian Gymnastics Union
- National federation: Uzbekistan Gymnastics Federation

Olympic Games
- Appearances: 0

The Uzbekistan women's national artistic gymnastics team represents Uzbekistan in FIG international competitions.

== History ==
After the fall of the Soviet Union, a handful of former Soviet gymnasts started competing for Uzbekistan. Uzbekistan has never fielded a team at the Olympic Games; however they have sent at least one gymnast to each Olympic Games since 1996. Their 2012 Olympian, Luiza Galiulina, was disqualified after testing positive for the banned diuretic drug furosemide.

Uzbek gymnast Oksana Chusovitina holds many Olympic records for the sport of gymnasts: at the 2020 Olympic Games, Chusovitina was 46 years old, making her the oldest female Olympic gymnast ever. Additionally she has competed at eight Olympic games (five of which she competed for Uzbekistan), the most of any Olympic gymnast.

== Senior roster ==
Name	Birth date and age	Birthplace
Lobar Amrillaeva	April 1, 2006 (age 20)	Kashkadarya
Dildora Aripova	January 29, 2004 (age 22)	Tashkent
Oksana Chusovitina	June 19, 1975 (age 51)	Tashkent
Giunaz Jumabekova	November 8, 2004 (age 22)	Karakalpakstan
Ominakhon Khalilova	December 15, 1998 (age 27)	Andijan
Odinakhon Robidjonova	June 1, 2007 (age 19)	Tashkent
Aleksandra Shevchenko	January 26, 2008 (age 18)	Tashkent

== Most decorated gymnasts ==
This list includes all Uzbek female artistic gymnasts who have won a medal at the Olympic Games or the World Artistic Gymnastics Championships. Medals that Oksana Chusovitina won while competing for the Soviet Union, the Unified Team, and Germany are not included; only medals won for Uzbekistan.

Rank	Gymnast	Team	AA	VT	UB	BB	FX	Olympic Total	World Total	Total
1	Oksana Chusovitina			2003; 2001; 2005; 1993; 2002				0	5	5

== See also ==
- List of Olympic female artistic gymnasts for Uzbekistan
- Soviet Union women's national artistic gymnastics team
