= Bangladesh Gymnastics Federation =

Governing body of gymnastics in Bangladesh

- Formation: 1972
- Headquarters: Dhaka, Bangladesh
- Region served: Bangladesh
- Official language: Bengali

The Bangladesh Gymnastics Federation is the national federation for gymnastics and is responsible for governing the sport in Bangladesh. Sheikh Bashir Ahmed Mamun is the president of the federation.

== History ==
The Bangladesh Gymnastics Federation was established in 1972 and received government recognition the next year. In November 1973, national gymnastic competitions were held for the first time in Bangladesh. In 1974, competition for women gymnastic were started. In August 2019, Japan donated equipment, worth 1.2 million taka, to the federation.
