= Uliana Perebinosova =

Russian artistic gymnast

Uliana Perebinosova Улья́на Перебино́сова
- Full name: Uliana Sergeyevna Perebinosova
- Born: 4 May 2001 (age 25)

Gymnastics career
- Discipline: Women's artistic gymnastics
- Country represented: Russia
Medal record
Representing Russia
European Championships
Gold medal – first place	2018 Glasgow	Team
Summer Universiade
Silver medal – second place	2019 Napoli	Team
Silver medal – second place	2019 Napoli	All-Around
Bronze medal – third place	2019 Napoli	Balance Beam
Bronze medal – third place	2019 Napoli	Floor Exercise
FIG World Cup
Event	1st	2nd	3rd
World Cup	0	1	0
World Challenge Cup	1	1	1

Uliana Sergeyevna Perebinosova (Russian: Улья́на Серге́евна Перебино́сова; born 4 May 2001) is a Russian artistic gymnast and the 2020 Russian National Champion. She was part of the team that won gold in the team competition at the 2018 European Championships.

== Gymnastics career ==
=== 2018 ===
In 2018, Perebinosova was named to Russia’s team for the European championships alongside Irina Alexeeva, Aliya Mustafina, Angelina Simakova, and Lilia Akhaimova. She was sent as a specialist, competing solely on the uneven bars. She qualified to the bars final in third after a successful qualification routine. In the team final, she posted a score of 14.033 on bars, which contributed to Russia winning the gold medal over France, who took the silver. Despite performing a clean exercise in the uneven bars final, she ended up finishing in fifth with a score of 14.166, a tenth down from her qualification performance.

=== 2019 ===
Perebinosova made her 2019 debut at the Universiade games in Italy, which she attended with Akhaimova and world champion Tatiana Nabieva. She replaced Polina Fedorova, who was initially slated to be on the team. She contributed scores on bars, beam, and floor to Russia’s silver medal performance in the team final. Perebinosova also qualified to the all-around final in third place, posting the same score as teammate Akhaimova (53.000) but ranking lower due to tie-breaking procedures. In the all-around final, Perebinosova incurred a five-tenth deduction on for putting her hands on the beam to steady herself. Once again, she and Akhaimova posted the same total score (52.700), but Perebinosova edged her teammate out for the silver medal, in part due to a high uneven bars score (14.375). Both Russians finished behind Japanese gymnast Hitomi Hatakeda. In event finals, despite qualifying in second, Perebinosova placed seventh on bars after struggling through her routine, scoring a low 12.750. However, she rallied to win the bronze medals on both beam and floor, posting scores of 12.800 and 12.700, respectively. The Russian squad of Perebinosova, Akhaimova, and Nabieva was the most decorated in women’s artistic gymnastics at the Universiade, bringing in one gold, three silver, and four bronze medals. Perebinosova was the most decorated of the Russians with two silvers and two bronzes.

Perebinosova competed at the Russian Cup and was one of nine gymnasts in contention for the worlds team. However, she was not named to the nominative or official roster.

=== 2020 ===
Uliana competed in the 2020 Russian Artistic Gymnastics Championships held from 4th to the 8th November in Penza, Russia. She won gold medals in the All-Round event with a score of 106.597 as well as the floor event with 13.333, placed second in the uneven bars to earn a silver and placed joint third on the balance beam to earn a bronze. During this championship, Uliana also placed second along with Rukhshona Azamova, Elizaveta Serova and Viktoria Trykina, representing Moscow, in the team event.
